= 2026 in rhythm and blues =

This article summarizes the events, album releases, and album release dates in rhythm and blues for the year 2026.

== Events ==
=== January ===
- On January 28, Bryan Loren died at the age of 59.

=== February ===
- On February 1, the 68th Annual Grammy Awards were held. Kendrick Lamar and SZA won Record of the Year and Best Melodic Rap Performance for "Luther". Olivia Dean won Best New Artist. Kehlani won Best R&B Performance and Best R&B Song for "Folded". Leon Thomas won Best Traditional R&B Performance for "Vibes Don't Lie" and Best R&B Album for Mutt. Durand Bernarr won Best Progressive R&B Album for Bloom. Samara Joy won Best Jazz Vocal Album for Portrait. Mariah Carey received the MusiCares Person of the Year award. Pharrell Williams received the Dr. Dre Global Impact Award. Brandy and Kirk Franklin received the Black Music Icon Award. Whitney Houston and Chaka Khan received the Lifetime Achievement Award.
- On February 3, Lamonte McLemore died at the age of 90.
- On February 11, Janet Jackson's Rhythm Nation 1814 by Janet Jackson, "Trouble in Mind" by Bertha Hill, "Jesus Gave Me Water" by The Soul Stirrers, and Maggot Brain by Funkadelic were inducted into the Grammy Hall of Fame.
- On February 28, John P. Hammond died at the age of 83. On the same day, the 57th NAACP Image Awards were held. 803Fresh and Fantasia won Outstanding Duo, Group or Collaboration (Traditional) for "Boots on the Ground (Remix)". Chris Brown, Bryson Tiller and Usher won Outstanding Soul/R&B Song and Outstanding Duo, Group or Collaboration (Contemporary) for "It Depends". Tyla won Outstanding International Song for "Is It". Kendrick Lamar and SZA won Outstanding Music Video/Visual Album for "Luther". Sinners (Original Motion Picture Soundtrack) won Outstanding Original Score for TV/Film and Outstanding Soundtrack/Compilation Album. On the same day, the Brit Awards 2026 were held. Olivia Dean won British Album of the Year for The Art of Loving, British Artist of the Year and Best Pop Act. Sault won Best R&B Act.

=== March ===
- On March 1, Bob Power died at the age of 73.
- On March 26, the MOBO Awards 2026 were held. Olivia Dean won Song of the Year for "Man I Need", Album of the Year for The Art of Loving, and Best Female Act. Raye won Video of the Year for "Where Is My Husband!". Wizkid won Best African Music Act. Ayra Starr won Best International Act. Flo won Best R&B/Soul Act. On the same day, the 2026 iHeartRadio Music Awards were held. Kehlani won R&B Song of the Year for "Folded". Chris Brown won R&B Artist of the Year. Leon Thomas won R&B Album of the Year for Pholks and Best New R&B Artist. Moliy won World Artist of the Year.

=== April ===
- On April 16, D4vd was arrested for the killing of Celeste Rivas Hernandez.

=== May ===
- On May 8, Janet Jackson’s Rhythm Nation 1814 was inducted into the Grammy Hall of Fame.
- On May 13, Clarence Carter died at the age of 90.
- On May 25, the American Music Awards of 2026 were held. Bruno Mars won Best R&B Song for "I Just Might", Best R&B Album for The Romantic, and Best Male R&B Artist. SZA won Best Female R&B Artist. Leon Thomas won Breakthrough R&B Artist.
- On May 31, Dexter Wansel died at the age of 75.

=== June ===
- On June 1, Davido and Organized Noize were inducted into the Black Music & Entertainment Walk of Fame.
- On June 2, Peabo Bryson died at the age of 75.
- On June 3, James Blood Ulmer died at the age of 86.
- On June 5, Talay Riley was killed at the age of 35.
- On June 13, the intersection of Grumman Avenue and Elizabeth Avenue in Newark, New Jersey was named Faith Evans Way.
- On June 16, Flo was awarded the ASCAP Vanguard Award.
- On June 22, Clive Davis died at the age of 94.
- On June 25, Leon Thomas was awarded the ASCAP Vanguard Award.
- On June 28, the BET Awards 2026 were held. Kehlani won Video of the Year for "Folded" and Best Female R&B/Pop Artist. Mariah the Scientist won the Viewer's Choice Award for "Burning Blue". Leon Thomas won Best Male R&B/Pop Artist. Olivia Dean won Best New Artist. Teyana Taylor won Video Director of the Year and received the Icon of the Year Award. Lauryn Hill received the Living Legend Icon Award.

=== September ===
- On September 1, Cassandra Wilson died at the age of 70.
- On September 26, Angela Stribling died at the age of 58.

=== October ===
- On October 5, Freddie Jackson died at the age of 70.

=== November ===
- On November 14, Luther Vandross and Sade will be inducted into the Rock & Roll Hall of Fame.
- On November 27, the Soul Train Awards 2026 are scheduled to be held.

== Released albums ==
=== January ===
Day	Artist(s)	Album	Record label(s)	Entering chart position
9	Sault	Chapter 1	Forever Living Originals	
9	The Kid Laroi	Before I Forget	Loma Vista	Debuted at No. 2 on the ARIA Albums Chart; Debuted at No. 6 on the Billboard 200
9	Yung Bleu	Therapy	Moon Boy, Stem	
16	Ady Suleiman	Chasing	AWAL	
16	Elijah Blake	The Gemini	RKeyTek, MNRK	
16	NSG	Sounds Of The Diaspora	Self-released	
16	The James Hunter Six	Off The Fence	Easy Eye Sound, Concord	
16	The Sha La Das	Your Picture	Diamond West	
21	Jada Kingdom	Just A Girl In A Money Man's World	Kingdom Mab	
21	Ragz Originale	Keepsake	Santa Anna	
23	Ari Lennox	Vacancy	Interscope	Debuted at No. 172 on the Billboard 200
23	BBE	Naive Melodies	BBE	
23	DJ Harrison	ElectroSoul	Stones Throw	
23	Jason Derulo	The Last Dance (Part 1)	Creative Genius, Create	
23	Solomon Hicks	How Did I Ever Get This Blue	Artone, Provogue	
23	Van Morrison	Somebody Tried to Sell Me a Bridge	Exile	
23	Wizkid & Asake	Real, Vol. 1	Starboy, Giran, Empire	
30	Joel Ross	Gospel Music	Blue Note, UMG	
30	Jordan Ward	Backward	ARTium, Interscope	
30	Labrinth	Cosmic Opera: Act I	Columbia	
30	Soulive	Flowers	Floki	
30	Terrace Martin	Passion	Sounds of Crenshaw, Empire	

=== February ===
Day	Artist(s)	Album	Record label(s)	Entering chart position
6	Aquakultre	1783	Next Door	
6	Charlotte Day Wilson	Patchwork	Stone Woman, XL	
6	Cory Wong	Lost in the Wonder	Roundwound	
6	Ella Mai	Do You Still Love Me?	10 Summers, Interscope	Debuted at No. 44 on the Billboard 200
6	Jaymin	Sweet Nothings	Warner	
6	Joji	Piss in the Wind	Palace Creek, Virgin	Debuted at No. 5 on the Billboard 200
6	Kareen Lomax	Ijan	Music is Fun	
6	Kayla Brianna	Lover Girl	Empire	
6	Marc Broussard	S.O.S. V: Songs of the '50s	Gman	
6	Raahiim	Pray for Me	MNRK	
6	Ron Carter & Ricky Dillard	Sweet, Sweet Spirit	Motown, Blue Note	
13	Ariel	Amatoria	Mello Music Group	
13	Brent Faiyaz	Icon	ISO Supremacy	Debuted at No. 6 on the Billboard 200
13	Jill Scott	To Whom This May Concern	Blues Babe, Human Re Sources, The Orchard	Debuted at No. 33 on the Billboard 200
13	JP Cooper	Just A Few Folk	Island, Universal	
13	Momoko Gill	Momoko	Strut	
13	Raheem DeVaughn	Quiet Storm Lover Tome Un	Even	
13	Terrace Martin	Peace	Sounds of Crenshaw, Empire	
13	The Olympians	In Search of Revival	Daptone	
13	Tiana Major9	November Scorpio	+1	
16	Willow	Petal Rock Black	Three Six Zero	
19	Gabriela Richardson	Isola	Virgin Music Spain	
20	Choker	Heaven Ain't Sold	Jet Fuzz	
20	Dominique Fils-Aimé	My World Is The Sun	Ensoul	
20	Leigh-Anne	My Ego Told Me To	Virgin	Debuted at No. 3 on the UK Albums Chart
20	Meg Mac	It's My Party	ONErpm	
20	Moonchild	Waves	ONErpm	
20	Naïka	Eclesia	AWAL	
27	Altered Five Blues Band	Hammer & Chisel	Blind Pig	
27	Bruno Mars	The Romantic	Atlantic	Debuted at No. 1 on the Billboard 200
27	Gena (Liv.e & Karriem Riggins)	The Pleasure Is Yours	Lex	
27	GoGo Morrow	Set	MNRK	
27	Lindsey Webster	Music In Me	Shanachie	
27	Michelle David & The True-Tones	Soul Woman	Record Kicks	

=== March ===
Day	Artist(s)	Album	Record label(s)	Entering chart position
1	DJ Dmg & October London	Midnight in Houston	The Colleagues	
4	Eliza	The Darkening Green	Log Off Records	
6	Arima Ederra	A Rush to Nowhere	RCA	
6	Gnarls Barkley	Atlanta	Loma Vista	
6	Lloyiso	Never Thought I Could (Part 1)	Ndlovu, Empire	
6	Murkage Dave	Brut Thoughts	The Outlet	
6	Pimmie	Don't Come Home	OVO, Santa Ana	
6	Shabaka	Of The Earth	Self-released	
6	Terrace Martin	Purpose	Sounds of Crenshaw, Empire	
6	Ty Dolla Sign	Girl Music Vol. 1	Atlantic	
6	Waterbaby	Memory Be A Blade	Sub Pop	
6	Yebba	Jean	RCA	
12	P1Harmony	Unique	FNC Entertainment	Debuted at No. 4 on the Billboard 200
13	Anjimile	You're Free to Go	4AD	
13	Jack Harlow	Monica	Atlantic	Debuted at No. 40 on the Billboard 200
13	James Blake	Trying Times	Good Boy	Debuted at No. 3 on the UK Albums Chart
13	Leven Kali	LK99	Def Jam	
13	Olive Jones	For Mary	Nettwerk	
20	Alessia Cara	Love Or Lack Thereof	Def Jam	
20	Alex Isley	When The City Sleeps	Free Lunch, Warner	
20	Chris Standring	Time Of Change	Ultimate Vibe	
20	Ego Ella May	Good Intentions	Believe	
20	Keri Hilson	We Need To Talk: Redemption	Audible Art Club, Create	
20	MT Jones	Joy	Emdmm	
20	Naomi Scott	F.I.G	Alter	
20	RealestK	Forgive To Forget	Standard	
20	Son Little	Cityfolk	Anti	
20	Tedeschi Trucks Band	Future Soul	Swamp Family, Fantasy	Debuted at No. 166 on the Billboard 200
20	Terrace Martin	Perspective	Sounds of Crenshaw, Empire	
27	Adrian Quesada	Trio Asenino	Electric Deluxe Recorders, ATO	
27	Elmiene	Sounds for Someone	Polydor, Def Jam	Debuted at No. 46 on the UK Albums Chart
27	Fetty Wap	Zavier	RGF, 300	Debuted at No. 169 on the Billboard 200
27	Irreversible Entanglements	Future Present Past	Impulse, Verve	
27	Jozzy	Soundtrack 2 Get Her Back	Dope By Accident, RBC, BMG	
27	Justine Skye	Candy	Warner	
27	Raye	This Music May Contain Hope	Human Re Sources	Debuted at No. 1 on the UK Albums Chart; Debuted at No. 11 on the Billboard 200
27	Rum.gold	Is There Anybody Home?	Independent Co	
27	Tom Misch	Full Circle	Beyond the Groove, AWAL	Debuted at No. 9 on the UK Albums Chart
27	Victory Boyd	Confessions of a Lonely Girl	Roc Nation	
27	Yung Bleu	World At War	Broke Genius	

=== April ===
Day	Artist(s)	Album	Record label(s)	Entering chart position
3	Arlo Parks	Ambiguous Desire	Transgressive	Debuted at No. 13 on the UK Albums Chart
3	Omah Lay	Clarity of Mind	KeyQaad, Warner	
3	Swae Lee	Same Difference	Eardruma, Interscope	
3	TheArtist	DND	No More Heroes, Santa Anna	
3	Thundercat	Distracted	Brainfeeder	Debuted at No. 116 on the Billboard 200
3	Tory Lanez	LOL: Slutty Bass	PRSL	
10	Isaia Huron	Mr. Lovebomb	Slang, Itola, RCA	
10	Jacob Banks	Limerence	Nobody	
10	Kumail	Mudbrown	Tru Thoughts	
10	Les Imprimés	Fading Forward	Big Crown	
10	Mamas Gun	Dig!	Candelion, Blue Élan	
10	Momo Boyd	Miss Michigan	Roc Nation	
10	Simone Ashley	Songs I Wrote In New York	Abbey Road, Universal	
10	Tink	Fuck, Marry, Kill	Winter's Diary, Empire	
10	Tiwayo	Outsider	Record Kicks	
10	Wesley Joseph	Forever Ends Someday	Secretly Canadian	
15	King Promise & Mr Eazi	See What We've Done	emPawa	
16	Crystal Murray	Anatony Of A Cry	Self-released	
16	Honey Dijon	The Nightlife	SOS	
17	Adrian Younge	Younge	Linear Labs	
17	BombayMami	Peaceful Attitude	MNRK	
17	Dan Penn	Smoke Filled Room	Last Music	
17	Immanuel Wilkins Quartet	Live at the Village Vanguard, Vol. 2	Blue Note	
17	Marc Broussard	Chance Worth Taking	Keeping The Blues Alive	
17	MarcLo	11 Days	Self-released	
17	Pastels & Jessica Domingo	Blue Fantasy	Nettwerk	
17	Protoje	The Art Of Acceptance	In.Digg.Nation, Ineffable	
17	Rjtheweirdo	At Least She's Beautiful	Ezmny, Create	
17	Yaya Bey	Fidelity	Drink Sum Wtr	
17	Zayn	Konnakol	Mercury	Debuted at No. 4 on the UK Albums Chart; Debuted at No. 18 on the Billboard 200
24	Adam Hawley	Electric	MBF	
24	Akon	Beautiful Day	Konvict Kulture	
24	Angélique Kidjo	Hope!!	Parlophone, Warner Music France	
24	Dianne Reeves	Star Child	Arkadia	
24	Ebony Riley	Beautiful Tragedy	Interscope	
24	Esa Williams	Dala What We Must	BBE	
24	Gareth Donkin	Extraordinary	Drink Sum Wtr	
24	Jai'Len Josey	Serial Romantic	Def Jam	
24	Jordan Rakei	Between Us	Fontana	
24	Kehlani	Kehlani	Atlantic	Debuted at No. 4 on the Billboard 200
24	Liam Bailey	Shadow Town	Home for Us	
24	Lolo Zouaï	Reverie	Because	
24	Norah Jane & Mor.lov	Godspeed	Tru Thoughts	
29	Duendita	Existential Thottie	10k Global	

=== May ===
Day	Artist(s)	Album	Record label(s)	Entering chart position
1	Asake	M$ney	Giran, Empire	
1	Casper Sage	Patina	Free Lunch, Warner	
1	Durand Bernarr	Bernarr	Dsing, Create	
1	India Shawn	Subject to Change	Vanta	
1	Oteil Burbridge & Lamar Williams Jr	The Offering	Self-released	
1	The Black Keys	Peaches!	Easy Eye Sound, Warner	Debuted at No. 72 on the Billboard 200
1	The Nth Power	Never Alone	GroundUp	
1	Tiara Thomas	Make It Make Sense	ONErpm	
1	Wejdene	Unmade	Hall Access, Sony France	
1	Ziggy Marley	Brightside	Tuff Gong	
8	Blue Lab Beats	The Blue Lab Beats Show	Blue Adventure	
8	Brother Wallace	Electric Love	ATO	
8	Chris Brown	Brown	RCA	Debuted at No. 7 on the Billboard 200
8	J Balvin & Ryan Castro	Omertà	Sueños Globales, UMG	
8	Kabza de Small, The Big Hash & Sly	Love Is A Star	Sony Africa	
8	Lykke Li	The Afterparty	Neon Gold	
8	Mack Keane	Wide Eyed	Star Trak, Broke	
8	Navah Sea, Braxton Cook & Saxton Chef	What Do I Know Now?	Bounce In Place	
8	Stix Hooper	Cookin' Up The Groove	Self-released	
13	Karen Bernod	Iris	Natively Creative	
15	Brooklyn Funk Essentials	Black Butterfly	Black Plastic Magick, Dorado	
15	Drake	Habibti	OVO Sound, Republic	Debuted at No. 2 on the Billboard 200
15	Drake	Iceman	OVO Sound, Republic	Debuted at No. 1 on the Billboard 200
15	Drake	Maid of Honour	OVO Sound, Republic	Debuted at No. 3 on the Billboard 200
15	Dua Saleh	Of Earth & Wires	Ghostly International	
15	Famous Pluto	Street Therapist	Onerpm	
15	Mýa	Retrospect	Planet 9, Virgin Music Group	
15	Os Garotin	Força da juventude	Labrights	
15	Sech	Secho Gang	Rimas	
15	Shaggy	Lottery	Ranch, VP	
15	Tank and the Bangas	The Last Balloon	Verve	
15	The Elovaters	Shark Belly Motel	Belly Full	
15	Tone Stith	The Edge	MNRK	
22	6lack	Love Is the New Gangsta	LVRN	Debuted at No. 154 on the Billboard 200
22	Aja Monet	The Color of the Rain	Drink Sum Wtr	
22	Álvaro Díaz	Omakase	Universal Latino	
22	Fern.	Persona:2000	Island Philippines	
22	Joé Dwèt Filé	Hatelove	DF Empire, Top Island	
22	NSG	Sounds of the Diaspora 2	Self-released	
22	Skylar Grey	Wasted Potential	Self-released	
22	Thee Marloes	Di Hotel Malibu	Big Crown	
29	Anderson .Paak	K-Pops!	Capitol	
29	Brian Jackson & Masters at Work	Now More Than Ever	BBE	
29	Chxrry	U, Me & My Ego	XO, Universal	
29	Labrinth	Cosmic Opera: Act II	Columbia	
29	KFMD & Qing Madi	Barely Legal	KFMD, MAD Capital	
29	Phoenix James	Teeth	+1	
29	Reuben Aziz	Mind the Gap	Alamo	
29	Skye Newman	SE9	Columbia	

=== June ===
Day	Artist(s)	Album	Record label(s)	Entering chart position
2	Imani Imani	Papercut	pgLang, Interscope	
5	Down to the Bone	This Way Forward	Trippin N' Rhythm	
5	Inayah	Therapy Wasn't Enough	Empire	
5	Jalen Ngonda	Doctrine Of Love	Daptone	
5	Lakecia Benjamin	We Dream	Artwork	
5	Lizzo	Bitch	Nice Life, Atlantic	
5	Malcolm Todd	Do That Again	Columbia	Debuted at No. 5 on the Billboard 200
5	Pheelz	A Rii Set	Rii	
5	Sparklmami	In this body	Verve, Slowplay	
12	Bendrethegiant	Swollen Eyes	Tender Loving Empire	
12	Blxst	Labor of Love	Empire	
12	Infinity Song	Infinity Song	Roc Nation	
12	Jessie Reyez	A Little Vengeance	Fmly, Island	Debuted at No. 141 on the Billboard 200
12	Justin99	99 Problems	Sony Africa	
12	Kels	Dirty Blues Princess	Universal	
12	Melvin Riley	No Ai	Gusto	
12	Tori Kelly	God Must Really Love Me	Epic	
19	Ama	Ama	I Came Home Late, ISO Supremacy, Pulse	
19	Chi Pu	EXs	C-Global, Sony Hong Kong	
19	Chlöe & Timbaland	Resurrection	Parkwood, Columbia	
19	Dylan Sinclair	Make You Feel	Five Stone	
19	Glenn Lewis	Overture	Reimagery	
19	Karencici	Loser.	Warner Taiwan	
19	Lee Lewis	Howl	AWAL	
19	Myles Smith	My Mess, My Heart, My Life	Sony	Debuted at No. 2 on the UK Albums Chart; Debuted at No. 135 on the Billboard 200
19	PJ Morton	Saturday Night/Sunday Morning	Morton, SRG-ILS	
19	Swamp Dogg	Swamp Dogg Contemplates The Afterlife	S-Curve	
19	The War and Treaty	The Story of Michael and Tanya	Atlantic	
26	Alewya	Zero	Because London	
26	Amaria BB	Comes to Light	XLVL Phoenix, AWAL	
26	Baby J	You Don't Know My Name	RCA	
26	Capella Grey	..Well Then.	Allepac the Family	
26	Cécile McLorin Salvant	With Every Breath I Take	Nonesuch	
26	Devon Gilfillian	Time Will Tell	Fantasy, Concord	
26	Ibeyi	Offering	AWAL	
26	Kwn	And All Pride Aside	RCA	Debuted at No. 93 on the UK Albums Chart
26	Naomi Sharon	No Sleep In Paradise	OVO	
26	Nectar Woode	Naturally	Since 93	
26	Omarion	O2 - Part 1	Create	
26	Rico Love	97 Bad Boy	D1MG	
26	Ryan Beatty	Sweet Fortune	Warner	
26	Sekou	In A World We Don't Belong Pt. 2	EMI, Republic	
26	Tasha	You Are Spring!	Bayonet	
26	Wande Coal	King Coal	Starstruck	
26	Wyclef Jean	Clef Notes – Quantum Leap, Vol. 1	SodoMoodLab	

=== July ===
Day	Artist(s)	Album	Record label(s)	Entering chart position
3	Sienna Spiro	Visitor	Capitol	Debuted at No. 2 on the UK Albums Chart; Debuted at No. 9 on the Billboard 200
3	Tekno	Where Did Love Go?	emPawa Africa	
3	Tonio Armani & Lil Jon	Outside For The Summer	Death Row	
9	Jaz Karis	Twenty Something	MNRK	
9	Mono	Mỹ điệu ca	SEA, UMusic Vietnam	
10	Allison Russell	In the Hour of Chaos	Fantasy	
10	Baby Rose	Yearnalism	Secretly Canadian	
10	Candice	Nénuphar	Maison Mère, Sony France	
10	Fathers (Kenny Beats, Kiefer, Carrtoons & Nate Smith)	Fathers	Blue Note	
10	Kelela	New Avatar	Warp	
10	Ne-Yo	Highway 79	HSG, 10K Projects	
10	Sango	Rhythm & Melody	Mass Appeal	
10	The-Dream	Love/Hate II	RadioKilla, Republic	
17	Adrian Younge	Afro-Disco Makossa	Linear Labs Crew, Sony	
17	Ambré	Peyote	Roc Nation	
17	Avara	Why do women jump in the fire?	10K Projects	
17	Buju Banton	Too Too Bad	Gargamel	
17	Euge Groove	The Phoenix	Shanachie	
17	Fantastic Negrito	Alive!	Storefront	
17	Kamal.	How the f*** does everybody else manage?	Def Jam, Neighbourhood	
17	Mama Terra	Inner Space	Acid Jazz	
17	Martin Luther McCoy	Welcome Back Love	Rebel Soul	
17	Masego	Fix Your Face	EQT, Capitol	
17	Nao Yoshioka	Self	Sweet Soul	
17	Nia Archives	Emotional Junglist	Universal	Debuted at No. 30 on the UK Albums Chart
17	Olivia O'Brien	Pixie	Gamma	
17	Ranky Tanky	This Village	Self-released	
17	SadBoi	God Forbid I Have Fun.	LVRN	
17	Sandollar	Sunny Day	Pacific	
17	Steve Lacy	Oh Yeah?	RCA, L-M	Debuted at No. 14 on the Billboard 200
17	Syd	Beard	Free Lunch	
24	Adanna Duru	The Naijamerican Dream	Broke	
24	Bootsy Collins	Mental Health	Bootzilla	
24	Budjerah	Gentleman	Warner Australia	Debuted at No. 14 on the ARIA Albums Chart
24	Chenayder	Outdated	Alamo	
24	Chris Crispy	Behind the Shades	Self-released	
24	Corey King	Change the Wind	Western Vinyl	
24	DameDame*	Dreams On The Passenger Seat	Robots & Humans, Sony UK	
24	Felix Ames	Did The Rain Stop?	Reunion	
24	Hyolyn	OriginaLyn	ReH	
24	Kenyon Dixon	Ego Ruins Everything	Self-released	
24	Kylie Cantrall	Valley Girl Problems	Artist Partner, Heroine Music, Republic	
24	Love Spells	Love Is The Law	RCA	
24	Nicholas Payton & Butcher Brown	A Supreme Blue	Concord Jazz	
24	Nick Hakim	I Can See	Earseed	
24	Osé	Feels Like Home	RCA	
24	Portraits of Tracy	Q: From Where Do Our Primal Instincts Originate A: MTV!	Self-released	
24	TheHonestGuy	Don't Disturb the Groove: Afrosoul	Self-released	
24	Tomás Doncker & The True Groove All-Stars	Alive In Paris	True Groove	
24	Tyla	A*Pop	Fax, Epic	Debuted at No. 43 on the Billboard 200
24	Willow	The Thread	Three Six Zero	
27	Rakiyah	My Collection of Boy Tears	Self-released	
31	Ariana Grande	Petal	Republic	Debuted at No. 1 on the Billboard 200
31	Cautious Clay	The Hours: High Noon	Fantasy	
31	Davido	Oriadé	Sony	
31	Domi and JD Beck	Who Asked?	Apeshit, Blue Note	
31	GA-20 & Charlie Musselwhite	Blues Now	New West	
31	Isaiah Falls	LVRS Paradise (Side B)	Roc Nation	
31	Jacquees	Mood 2	Cash Money	
31	Moliy	Baddies <3 Moliy	Gamma	
31	Odeal	For A Good Time...	LVRN	
31	Patchwork Inc.	More Patchwork	Empire	
31	Terri Lyne Carrington & Social Science	Trip the Night Fantastic	Candid	

=== August ===
Day	Artist(s)	Album	Record label(s)	Entering chart position
4	Fana Hues	Catch n' Release	Sweet Virtue	
5	Duckwrth	A.A.F.B-Sides	Them Hellas, The Blind Youth, Stem	
6	Baby Boy	Buck*	TheNamelessCollective, Epic	
7	Adrian Younge, Joyce Moreno & Tutty Moreno	Joyce e Tutty Moreno JID027	Jazz Is Dead	
7	CKay	Banger Boy	AWAL	
7	Dinner Party	Watchu Bringing?	Empire	
7	Flo	Therapy at the Club	EMI	Debuted at No. 5 on the UK Albums Chart; Debuted at No. 168 on the Billboard 200
7	Hurricane Wisdom	Weathering The World	Rebel, Gamma	Debuted at No. 108 on the Billboard 200
7	Q	Do You See Me?	Columbia	
7	Ravyn Lenae	Blue Island	Atlantic	
7	Roy Woods	X	OVO	
7	Somi	What Does It Take to Bloom?	Salon Africana	
10	WayV	Vision Wings	SM	
14	André Cymone	The Resurrection of Funk	Blindtango	
14	Ayra Starr	Starr Girl	Mavin, Republic	
14	Fridayy	Tension	Lost In Melody, Def Jam	
14	Genia	Intense Lover	Lana's Dream, Def Jam	
14	Jungle	Sunshine	Caiola, AWAL	Debuted at No. 4 on the UK Albums Chart; Debuted at No. 98 on the Billboard 200
14	Kunmie	22	Cidar Africa, Alt Music	
14	Martha Reeves	Searching	Fun Day	
14	Masicka	Forever Reign	Def Jam	
14	Morgan Freeman, Ground Zero Blues Club Band, Chineke! Orchestra & Martin Gellner	Morgan Freeman's Symphonic Blues Experience	Decca	
14	October London	Love Me For Me	Death Row, Gamma	
14	Sumin	Dinnermode	Standard Friends, Dreamus	
14	The Womack Sisters	The Womack Sisters	Daptone	
19	Meenoi	Lucid No. 2	Corpmee, YG Plus	
20	Beenie Man	Eminence	Billboard King	
20	Cleo Sol	Gentlewoman	Forever Living Originals	
21	Black Atlass	Eternity	Self-released	
21	Cehryl	Modern Music	Melancholia Motel	
21	Destin Conrad	Roadrunner	Empire	
21	Eric Bellinger	Eric Bellinger	Tamla, Evolve	
21	Jorja Smith	What Are the Odds	FAMM	Debuted at No. 17 on the UK Albums Chart
21	Keb' Mo'	The Breakdown	Concord	
21	Lexi Jayde	Lover Girl	Columbia	
21	Nate Sib	Reborn	Republic	
21	Ruth B.	Peace To Make	Reb, Alter, Artist Theory	
21	Sam Smith	Hazel Eyes	Capitol	Debuted at No. 21 on the UK Albums Chart
21	Sean Leon	To: Summer	Opposition	
21	Skinny Hightower	Feels Like Destiny	Castover	
21	Tiffany Young	Edge of Calm	Pacific, Dreamus	
21	Victony	Starlife	Outlawville, Encore	
21	Yung Bleu	Bleu Vandross 4	Broke Genius	
26	Saint Jhn	If Tomorrow Never Comes	Godd Complexx, Roc Nation	
27	Cory Henry	Devotion	Apostle	
28	Alabama Shakes	I Must Be Dreaming	Limestone, Island	Debuted at No. 157 on the Billboard 200
28	Dahi	Black Boy (Alternative)	Alter	
28	Danielle Nicole	Fireflies	40 Below	
28	Eli Derby	Loveshy	Art@War, Warner	
28	Erykah Badu & The Alchemist	Before the World Blows	Control Freaq, Empire	
28	Flowerovlove	Mini Skirt Warrior	Capitol	
28	Kam Franklin	Land Of The Neon Sun	Homegirl Island	
28	Ky-Mani Marley	Love and Energy	Konfrontation Muzik, DubShot	
28	Majid Jordan	Two Roads	OVO	
28	Prince	Timeless	Legacy	Debuted at No. 59 on the Billboard 200
28	Rod Wave	Don't Look Down	Alamo	Debuted at No. 1 on the Billboard 200
28	Ruthie Foster	Just Say Yes	Sun	
28	Steve Cropper & The Midnight Hour	Watching The Tide	Provogue, Artone	
28	Vory	Dondada	Eros, Empire	
28	Wyclef Jean	Q Theory – Quantum Leap, Vol. 2	SodoMoodLab	

=== September ===
Day	Artist(s)	Album	Record label(s)	Entering chart position
1	Nasty C & Tellaman	T's & C's Apply	TallRacks, Select Play	
10	Natanya	Attitude Era!	Human Re Sources	
11	Eli "Paperboy" Reed	Getting There	Yep Roc	
11	Ezra Collective	Here Because of Hope	Partisan	Debuted at No. 1 on the UK Albums Chart
11	FKJ	Tyber	Mom+Pop	
11	Ibibio Sound Machine	Chopping Mountain	Merge	
11	Jhené Aiko	Westside Whimsy	ArtClub, Def Jam	Debuted at No. 1 on the Billboard 200
11	Starchild and The New Romantic	Professional Wrestling	Self-released	
11	Tasha Cobbs Leonard	Tasha Unscripted	Motown Gospel, Capitol Christian	
11	Yemi Alade	It's Yemi Alade	Effyzzie	
18	Chaka Khan	Chakzilla	EarthSong, BMG	
18	Daley	Strange Nature	Texx7, The SRG/ILS	
18	Jaymin	Static	Warner	
18	Jovin Webb	Son of a Sinner	Blind Pig	
18	Kareen Lomax	Naji	Music is fun	
18	Mrozu	Wszystko czego chciałem	Self-released	
18	Rhiannon Giddens	Hope Is the Thing with Feathers	Nonesuch	
18	Seyi Vibez	Swaguu	NSNV, Empire	
21	Def.	2018.12.25	528Hz, Dreamus	
24	Sunandmoon (Ogi & Anoop)	"Tug of War"	After Dinner	
25	Benny Sings	22 Durnham Dew	Stones Throw	
25	Ekep Nkwelle	Caged Bird	Mack Avenue	
25	Jae Stephens	Audacity	Raedio, Def Jam	
25	Joy Oladokun	Hope Is a Heavy Thing	Concord	
25	Kiefer	Memory Bomb	Blue Note	
25	Leon Bridges	Happiness Anytime	Columbia	Debuted at No. 74 on the Billboard 200
25	Lizz Wright & Kenny Banks	Nearness	Blues & Greens	
25	Magnus Ferrell	Groove Therapy	Visva, Republic	
25	Megiapa	Intentions	International Anthem	
25	Nippa	Homegrown	Warner	
25	Tank	Experience	R&B Money, BMG	
25	Tinashe	Popstar	Atlantic	Debuted at No. 6 on the Billboard 200
28	Stevie Wonder	Songs in the Key of Life - The EP	Motown	

=== October ===
Day	Artist(s)	Album	Record label(s)	Entering chart position
1	Lalah Hathaway	Made in Chicago	SRG/ILS	
2	Boney James	A Simple Man	Concord	
2	Jamal Roberts	The Journey	19	
2	Meshell Ndegeocello	Synonym	Blue Note	
2	Victoria Monét	Frequency of Love	Lovett, RCA	Debuted at No. 49 on the Billboard 200
8	Jooyoung	90s Kids	043	
9	ALA.NI & Adrian Younge	Proud of Me	Liner Labs	
9	Danielle Ponder	Everything Has Changed	Dead Oceans	
9	DaniLeigh	With Love, From Dani	Rebellion	
9	Dawn Richard	Creole Culture	Merge	
9	Gabriella Cilmi	Pure Love	V2	
9	Girl Ultra	RRRomeo	Big Dada	
9	Johnny Venus	The 11th Hour	Sincethe80s, Epic	
9	Joyce Wrice	Machiko	Self-released	
9	Remi Wolf	Mud	Island	Debuted at No. 18 on the Billboard 200
15	Nsqk	Mosca	Honey	
16	Ella Thompson	Triumph & Sadness	Mr Bongo	
16	Fireboy DML	Zuko!	YBNL, Empire	
16	Gotts Street Park	Somewhere Between	Play It Again Sam	
16	Grace Carter	When Saturn Returns	Self-released	
16	Joony	Still Here	211	
16	K. Michelle	Jesus & Whiskey	Real Outlawz	
16	Lucky Daye	Aloud!	Warner	
16	Marian Hill	Act Two	Self-released	
16	Nao	Autumn	Little Tokyo	
16	Ryan Trey	Faith Over Fame	JustARegularDay	
23	Elena Pinderhughes	I Hope You Feel It Too	Fluture	
23	Ino Casablanca	Extasiaaaaa	Warner France	
23	John Legend	Muse	Republic	Debuted at No. 36 on the Billboard 200
23	Laila!	We'll Never Be This Young Again	Three Times Louder, Warner	
23	Michael Kiwanuka	Fudge	Polydor	Debuted at No. 13 on the UK Albums Chart
23	Surprise Chef	Frogs In A Pond	Concord Jazz	
23	Vedo	V	New Wav	
30	Aaron Frazer	Corners	Dead Oceans	
30	Christian McBride & Ursa Major	Points of Light	Mack Avenue	
30	Kirk Franklin	I Am What I Am	Fo Yo Soul, Tribl, Uptown	
30	Monophonics & Mike James Kirkland	The Business	Ubiquity	
30	Moses Boyd	Songs For Sinners	Exodus	
30	MorMor	No One Alive Will Listen	Promised Land	
30	Ronisia	Sensation	Sony France	
30	Yseult	Freak	Y.Y.Y	

=== November ===
Day	Artist(s)	Album	Record label(s)	Entering chart position
6	B2K	Eclipse	BPC	
6	Ciarán	Róisín	Ninja Tune	
6	Dawuna	Love's Arp	True Panther	
6	La Roux	Old Flames	Vertigo	
6	Louis York	The Heart of The Matter	Weirdo Workshop	
6	Ojerime	Don't Stare At The Flame	Fang	
6	Shenseea	Catalyst	Columbia	
13	Chlöe	A Chlöe Christmas	Parkwood	
13	EJ Jones	Luh Mo' Love	Quality Control	
13	Menahan Street Band	Illusions	Diamond West	
13	Rochelle Jordan	Disc 1, Disc 2, Disc 3, Disc 4	Empire	
13	Snoh Aalegra	Legendary Love	Stem	
13	Tanerélle	Simulation Blue	MNRK	
13	Vory	Eros 3.0 Fallout	Empire	

== Upcoming releases ==
=== November ===
Day	Artist(s)	Album	Record label(s)	Ref.
20	Joshua Redman	If Ever You Would Leave Us (We Play for Rollins)	Creative Control	
20	Joy Denalane	A Joyful Christmas	Warner Germany	
27	Brian Culbertson	The Midnight Tapes	Self-released	
27	Isaia Huron	Basement, Floored	RCA	
27	The Filthy Six	Return of The Swagger Junkies: Vol. 1	Color Red	

=== December ===
Day	Artist(s)	Album	Record label(s)	Ref.
4	Serpentwithfeet	Sentinel	One Little Independent Records	

=== Unscheduled and TBA ===
Artist(s)	Album	Record label(s)	Ref.
Adrian Marcel	RnBay SZN	Live From the Treehouse	
All-4-One	The Soul Of The Beatles Reimagined	Self-released	
Amanda Reifer	The Reifer Files	Title 9, Atlantic	
Amerie	TBA	TBA	
Beyoncé	Act III	Parkwood, Columbia	
Boyz II Men	TBA	Warner	
Brooke Combe	Too Late For Tears	Fontana	
Case	Love Jones, Vol. 2	Self-released	
Christopher Williams	War and Peace	SoNo	
D'Angelo	TBA	TBA	
Day26	TBA	Jive	
Dionne Warwick	DWuets	Warner	
Eric Benét	We Need Everybody	JBR	
Fallon	Both Sides	Self-released	
J. Valentine	Conversations With Women	R&B Money	
Joe	TBA	TBA	
Jordan Rakei	A Safe Place To Be Wild	Fontana	
Keith Robinson	Love Episodic II	Scenes & Songs, Equtr	
Kelis	TBA	TBA	
Kelly Rowland	TBA	KTR	
Kem	Alkemy	Kemistry	
Kes	TBA	TBA	
Labi Siffre	Unfinished Business	Demon	
Lake Street Dive	What About Flamingos?	Dive Not Drive	
Macy Gray	Love Songs for Big Hearts and Robots	DNA, Hitmaker	
Mahalia	TBA	BMG	
Maxi Priest	Family	Level Vibes	
Maxwell	blacksummers'NIGHT	Musze, BMG	
Monica	MDA	WME	
Muni Long	TBA	Def Jam	
Nailah Blackman	Born a Diamond	Big Money	
Naisha	911	Desi Trill, Interscope	
Nate James	The Man I Am	Mella	
Peabo Bryson	Grace	TBA	
Rihanna	R9	Roc Nation, Westbury Road	
Robert Cray	All Over Again	Nozzle	
Ryan Shaw	Rising Up	Form	
Stevie Wonder	Through The Eyes Of Wonder	Motown	
SZA	TBA	Top Dawg, RCA	
Teddy Swims	Ugly	Warner	
Teedra Moses	TBA	Black Moses	
Teezo Touchdown	Casting Call	Not Fit For Society, RCA	
The Internet	TBA	TBA	
Tiara Thomas	My Public Crashout	ONErpm	
Tiffany Evans	TBA	Self-released	
Tweet	The Memoirs of The Southern Hummingbird	SRG-ILS	

== Highest-charting songs ==
=== United States ===
R&B songs from any year which charted in the 2026 Top 40 of the Billboard Hot 100
Song	Artist	Project	Peak position
"I Just Might"	Bruno Mars	The Romantic	1
"Hate That I Made You Love Me"	Ariana Grande	Petal	1
"Man I Need"	Olivia Dean	The Art of Loving	2
"Risk It All"	Bruno Mars	The Romantic	4
"Petal"	Ariana Grande	Petal	4
"Solar Eclipse"	Drake featuring Don Toliver	Habibti (FOMO)	5
"So Easy (To Fall in Love)"	Olivia Dean	The Art of Loving	5
"Folded"	Kehlani	Kehlani	6
"Quebec"	Drake	Habibti (FOMO)	11
"Where Is My Husband!"	Raye	This Music May Contain Hope	11
"Yukon"	Justin Bieber	Swag	12
"Cold Shoulder"	Drake featuring Don Toliver and Yebba	Habibti (FOMO)	18
"Die on This Hill"	Sienna Spiro	Visitor	19
"Oh Yeah?"	Steve Lacy	Oh Yeah?	19
"Stay"	Ariana Grande	Petal	22
"Oh Well"	Ariana Grande	Petal	23
"Like I Do"	Ariana Grande	Petal	24
"Cha Cha Cha"	Bruno Mars	The Romantic	25
"A Couple Minutes"	Olivia Dean	The Art of Loving	26
"Chicago"	Michael Jackson	Xscape	26
"Morning Dew (Donk)"	Beyoncé	B'Day (20th Anniversary Edition)	26
"So Good"	Jhené Aiko featuring Kendrick Lamar	Westside Whimsy	26
"Mr. Know It All"	Teddy Swims	Ugly	26
"Is It a Crime"	Mariah the Scientist and Kali Uchis	Hearts Sold Separately	27
"Big Feelings"	Ariana Grande	Petal	27
"God Was Showing Off"	Bruno Mars	The Romantic	28
"Classic"	Drake	Habibti	28
"What You Need"	Tems	Love Is a Kingdom	29
"Never Get Over Me"	Ariana Grande	Petal	33
"I'm Spent"	Drake featuring Loe Shimmy	Habibti	34
"Fortworth"	Drake featuring PartyNextDoor	Habibti	36
"Some of Your Love"	PartyNextDoor	PartyNextDoor 3 (10-Year Edition)	36
"Why You Wanna Fight?"	Bruno Mars	The Romantic	38
"Warning Signs (Interlude)"	Ariana Grande	Petal	38
"Great Expectation"	Sienna Spiro	Visitor	38

=== United Kingdom ===
R&B songs from any year which charted in the 2026 Top 10 of the UK Singles Chart
Song	Artist	Project	Peak position
"Where Is My Husband!"	Raye	This Music May Contain Hope	1
"Great Expectation"	Sienna Spiro	Visitor	1
"So Easy (To Fall in Love)"	Olivia Dean	The Art of Loving	2

== Highest first-week consumption ==
List of albums with the highest first-week consumption (sales + streaming + track equivalent), as of September 2026 in the United States
Number	Album	Artist	1st-week consumption	1st-week position	Refs
1	Petal	Ariana Grande	295,000	1	
2	The Romantic	Bruno Mars	186,000	1	
3	Habibti	Drake	114,000	2	
4	Don't Look Down	Rod Wave	99,000	1	
5	Piss in the Wind	Joji	86,000	5	
6	Westside Whimsy	Jhené Aiko	74,000	1	
7	Kehlani	Kehlani	69,000	4	
8	Brown	Chris Brown	65,000	7	
9	Unique	P1Harmony	58,000	4	
10	Icon	Brent Faiyaz	58,000	6	

== All critically reviewed albums ranked ==
=== Metacritic ===
Number	Artist	Album	Average score	Number of reviews	Reference
1	Tinashe	Popstar	91	9 reviews	
2	Kelela	New Avatar	86	16 reviews	
3	The James Hunter Six	Off The Fence	86	5 reviews	
4	The Sha La Das	Your Picture	84	4 reviews	
5	The Womack Sisters	The Womack Sisters	83	7 reviews	
6	Gena (Liv.e & Karriem Riggins)	The Pleasure Is Yours	83	6 reviews	
7	Yaya Bey	Fidelity	83	6 reviews	
8	Jill Scott	To Whom This May Concern	82	13 reviews	
9	Jalen Ngonda	Doctrine Of Love	82	10 reviews	
10	Kehlani	Kehlani	82	7 reviews	
11	Nia Archives	Emotional Junglist	80	15 reviews	
12	Thundercat	Distracted	80	11 reviews	
13	Baby Rose	Yearnalism	80	5 reviews	
14	Michael Kiwanuka	Fudge	80	5 reviews	
15	Ravyn Lenae	Blue Island	79	10 reviews	
16	Tyla	A*Pop	79	8 reviews	
17	Dua Saleh	Of Earth & Wires	79	6 reviews	
18	Wesley Joseph	Forever Ends Someday	79	5 reviews	
19	Arlo Parks	Ambiguous Desire	77	14 reviews	
20	Dawn Richard	Creole Culture	77	5 reviews	
21	Nick Hakim	I Can See	77	5 reviews	
22	Meshell Ndegeocello	Synonym	76	6 reviews	
23	Victoria Monét	Frequency of Love	76	5 reviews	
24	Son Little	Cityfolk	76	4 reviews	
25	Steve Lacy	Oh Yeah?	75	9 reviews	
26	Ari Lennox	Vacancy	75	5 reviews	
27	Gnarls Barkley	Atlanta	75	5 reviews	
28	Leon Bridges	Happiness Anytime	74	8 reviews	
29	Brother Wallace	Electric Love	74	4 reviews	
30	Jorja Smith	What Are the Odds	73	5 reviews	
31	Flo	Therapy at the Club	71	8 reviews	
32	Zayn	Konnakol	69	4 reviews	
33	The Kid Laroi	Before I Forget	68	4 reviews	
34	Ariana Grande	Petal	67	16 reviews	
35	Bruno Mars	The Romantic	66	10 reviews	
36	Joji	Piss in the Wind	64	5 reviews	
37	Sienna Spiro	Visitor	63	5 reviews	
38	Drake	Habibti	59	8 reviews	
39	Lizzo	Bitch	49	8 reviews	
40	Jack Harlow	Monica	49	5 reviews	

== See also ==
- Previous article: 2025 in rhythm and blues
