= Hot Rap Songs =

American rap record chart published by Billboard

Hot Rap Songs (formerly known as Hot Rap Tracks and Hot Rap Singles) is a chart released weekly by Billboard in the United States. It lists the 25 most popular hip-hop/rap songs, calculated weekly by airplay on rhythmic and urban radio stations and sales in hip hop-focused or exclusive markets. Streaming data, digital downloads and All-Format radio stations were added to the methodology of determining chart rankings in 2012. From 1989 through 2001, it was based on how much the single sold in that given week.

== Chart statistics and other facts ==
=== Artists with the most number-one singles ===
Number	Artist	ref
33	Drake	
12	Lil Wayne	
11	Kanye West	
10	Puff Daddy	
10	Nicki Minaj	
8	LL Cool J	
7	50 Cent	
7	Cardi B	
7	Kendrick Lamar	
7	T.I.	
7	Travis Scott	

=== Artists with the most top-ten singles ===
Number	Artist	ref
159	Drake	
65	Future	
60	Kanye West	
59	Lil Wayne	
53	Lil Baby	
51	Nicki Minaj	
46	21 Savage	
45	Travis Scott	
42	Jay-Z	
41	Kendrick Lamar	

=== Artists with the most entries ===
Number	Artist	ref
283	Drake	
191	Future	
137	Kanye West	
128	Lil Baby	
125	Lil Wayne	
103	Travis Scott	
98	Jay-Z	
96	Nicki Minaj	
96	21 Savage	
86	Eminem	

=== Artists with the most consecutive weeks at number one ===
- 29 weeks – Macklemore & Ryan Lewis ("Thrift Shop", "Can't Hold Us")
- 25 weeks – Drake ("Janice STFU", "Quebec")
- 21 weeks – Lil Wayne ("Lollipop", "A Milli")
- 20 weeks – T-Pain ("Good Life", "Low"); T.I. ("Whatever You Like", "Live Your Life"); Drake ("I'm on One", "Headlines"); Lil Nas X featuring Billy Ray Cyrus ("Old Town Road"); Kendrick Lamar ("Not Like Us"); Kendrick Lamar and SZA ("Luther")
- 19 weeks – 50 Cent ("Candy Shop", "Hate It or Love It", "Just a Lil Bit")

Note: Above chart only considers songs that charted in 2004 or later

=== Artists simultaneously occupying the top three positions ===
- 50 Cent: April 2, 2005
1. "Candy Shop" (featuring Olivia) (No. 1 April 2, 2005)
2. "Hate It or Love It" (with The Game) (No. 2 April 2, 2005)
3. "How We Do" (with The Game) (No. 3 April 2, 2005)
- Drake: October 8 – 22, 2011
1. "I'm On One" (with DJ Khaled, Rick Ross & Lil Wayne) (No. 1 October 8, No. 2 October 15, and No. 3 October 22, 2011)
2. "Headlines" (No. 2 October 8 and No. 1 October 15, and October 22, 2011)
3. "She Will" (with Lil Wayne) (No. 3 October 8 and October 15, and No. 2 October 22, 2011)
- Drake: October 17, 2026
1. "Quebec"
2. "Cold Shoulder" (with Don Toliver & Yebba)
3. "Janice STFU"

=== Songs with the most weeks at number one ===
Weeks	Song	Artist	Year(s)	Source
47	"Luther"	Kendrick Lamar and SZA	2024–2025	
26	"Not Like Us"	Kendrick Lamar	2024–2025	
24	"Janice STFU"	Drake	2026	
20	"Old Town Road"	Lil Nas X featuring Billy Ray Cyrus	2019	
19	"Industry Baby"	Lil Nas X and Jack Harlow	2021–2022	
18	"Hot Boyz"	Missy "Misdemeanor" Elliott featuring Lil' Mo, Nas, Eve and Q-Tip	1999–2000	
18	"Fancy"	Iggy Azalea featuring Charli XCX	2014	
18	"Hotline Bling"	Drake	2015–2016	
17	"Panda"	Desiigner	2016	
17	"Mood"	24kGoldn featuring Iann Dior	2020–2021	

=== Self-replacement at number one ===
==== Lead artist ====
- Bow Wow — "Let Me Hold You" (Bow Wow feat. Omarion) (7 weeks) → "Like You" (Bow Wow feat. Ciara) (4 weeks) (September 10, 2005)
- Lil Wayne — "Lollipop" (Lil Wayne feat. Static Major) (18 weeks) → "A Milli" (7 weeks) (July 26, 2008)
- T.I. — "Whatever You Like" (10 weeks) → "Live Your Life" (T.I. feat. Rihanna) (10 weeks) (November 29, 2008)
- Drake — "Make Me Proud" (Drake feat. Nicki Minaj) (1 week) → "The Motto" (Drake feat. Lil Wayne) (14 weeks) (February 18, 2012)
- Macklemore & Ryan Lewis — "Thrift Shop" (Macklemore & Ryan Lewis feat. Wanz) (15 weeks) → "Can't Hold Us" (Macklemore & Ryan Lewis feat. Ray Dalton) (14 weeks) (May 4, 2013)
- Drake — "God's Plan" (11 weeks) → "Nice for What" (8 weeks) (April 21, 2018)
- Drake — "Nice for What" (8 weeks) → "In My Feelings" (11 weeks) (July 21, 2018)
- Post Malone — "Sunflower (Spider Man: Into the Spider-Verse)" (Post Malone & Swae Lee) (11 weeks) → "Wow" (1 week) (April 6, 2019)
- Kendrick Lamar — "Like That" (Future, Metro Boomin & Kendrick Lamar) (6 weeks) → "Not Like Us" (26 weeks) (May 18, 2024)
- Tyler, the Creator — "St. Chroma" (Tyler, the Creator feat. Daniel Caesar) (1 week) → "Sticky" (Tyler, the Creator feat. GloRilla, Sexyy Red & Lil Wayne) (2 weeks) (November 16, 2024)
- Kendrick Lamar — "Squabble Up" (1 week) → "TV Off" (Kendrick Lamar feat. Lefty Gunplay) (1 week) (December 14, 2024)
- Kendrick Lamar — "TV Off" (Kendrick Lamar feat. Lefty Gunplay) (1 week) → "Luther" (Kendrick Lamar & SZA) (47 weeks) (December 21, 2024)
- Kendrick Lamar — "Luther" (Kendrick Lamar & SZA) (47 weeks) → "Not Like Us" (26 weeks) (February 22, 2025)
- Kendrick Lamar — "Not Like Us" (26 weeks) → "Luther" (Kendrick Lamar & SZA) (47 weeks) (March 1, 2025)
- Drake — "Janice STFU" (24 weeks) → "Quebec" (1 week) (October 17, 2026)
- Drake — "Quebec" (1 week) → "Janice STFU" (24 weeks) (October 24, 2026)

==== Featured artist ====
- T-Pain — "Good Life" (Kanye West feat. T-Pain) (9 weeks) (November 3, 2007) → "Low" (Flo Rida feat. T-Pain) (11 weeks) (January 5, 2008)
- Kanye West — "Run This Town" (Jay-Z feat. Rihanna & Kanye West) (7 weeks) → "Forever" (Drake feat. Kanye West, Lil Wayne, & Eminem) (1 week) (November 14, 2009)
- Drake — "Wait for U" (Future feat. Drake & Tems) (2 weeks) → "Staying Alive" (DJ Khaled feat. Drake & Lil Baby) (1 week) (August 20, 2022)

==== Combined (lead and featured artist) ====
- 50 Cent — "Candy Shop" (50 Cent feat. Olivia) (6 weeks) → "Hate It or Love It" (The Game feat. 50 Cent) (4 weeks) (April 23, 2005) → "Just a Lil Bit" (50 Cent) (9 weeks) (May 21, 2005)
- Drake — "Fancy" (Drake feat. T.I. & Swizz Beatz) (1 week) → "Right Above It" (Lil Wayne feat. Drake) (5 weeks) (November 6, 2010)
- Chris Brown — "Look at Me Now" (Chris Brown feat. Lil Wayne & Busta Rhymes) (10 weeks) → "My Last" (Big Sean feat. Chris Brown) (2 weeks) (July 2, 2011)
- Drake — "I'm on One" (DJ Khaled feat. Drake, Rick Ross & Lil Wayne) (13 weeks) → "Headlines" (Drake) (7 weeks) (October 15, 2011)
- 2 Chainz — "Mercy" (Kanye West feat. Big Sean, Pusha T & 2 Chainz) (9 weeks) → "No Lie" (2 Chainz feat. Drake) (6 weeks) (September 8, 2012)
- Travis Scott — "Zeze" (Kodak Black feat. Travis Scott & Offset) (1 week) → "Sicko Mode" (Travis Scott) (10 weeks) (November 3, 2018)

=== Total weeks at number one per decade ===
==== 2000s ====
Total number weeks at number one as a lead or featured artist

1. Missy Elliott – 56 weeks
2. T.I – 49 weeks
3. Bow Wow – 40 weeks
4. Kanye West – 32 weeks
5. T-Pain – 29 weeks
6. Ludacris – 29 weeks
7. Lil Wayne – 28 weeks
8. Nelly – 25 weeks
9. Snoop Dogg – 20 weeks
10. Rihanna – 17 weeks

==== 2010s ====
Total number weeks at number one as a lead or featured artist

1. Drake – 125 weeks
2. Lil Wayne – 53 weeks
3. Macklemore & Ryan Lewis – 29 weeks
4. Post Malone – 28 weeks
5. Jay-Z – 25 weeks
6. Nicki Minaj – 25 weeks
7. Iggy Azalea – 24 weeks
8. Pitbull – 21 weeks
9. Rihanna – 20 weeks
10. Lil Nas X – 20 weeks

== See also ==
- List of Billboard number-one rap singles of the 1980s and 1990s
- List of Billboard number-one rap singles of the 2000s
- List of Billboard Hot Rap Songs number ones of the 2010s
- Hot R&B/Hip-Hop Songs
- Billboard charts
