= Lucky You (Isaiah Falls EP) =

EP by Isaiah Falls
- Released: October 17, 2025
- Recorded: 2025
- Genres: R&B; soul
- Label: LVRS ONLY
- Producer: Isaiah Falls

Isaiah Falls chronology
LVRS Paradise (Side A) (2025)	Lucky You (2025)

Lucky You is an extended play (EP) by American R&B singer-songwriter Isaiah Falls, released on 2025 October 17 by LVRS ONLY. The EP contains six tracks and features guest appearances from SiR, Alex Isley, Chase Shakur and Joyce Wrice.

== Background and release ==
Following the release of LVRS Paradise, Falls released the EP Lucky You. The EP was announced ahead of release with the lead single "Just a Dream," which features a guest appearance by Alex Isley. Falls described the project as an intimate exploration of love and vulnerability. According to the Falls the EP marks the beginning of a series of releases intended to focus primarily on the R&B, with a specific aim to evoke "late-night, sultry-type vibes.

== Personnel ==
- Isaiah Falls – vocals, songwriting, production (credited)
- Sir Darryl Farris – featured artist (track 1)
- Alexandra Isley – featured artist (track 3)
- Chase Shakur – featured artist (track 4)
- Joyce Wrice – featured artist (track 5)
- LVRS ONLY – record label

== Reception ==
Remixd Magazine praised the EP for its "emotional sincerity" and highlighted the chemistry between Falls and the featured artists, calling the project "a warm, intimate exploration of love in its many forms." The publication singled out "Brown Sugah" and "Butterflies" featuring Joyce Wrice as standout collaborations. Shatter the Standards praised Isaiah Falls' "presence and the instinct for intimacy," noting that the EP "uses intimacy as its organizing principle" and that its strength lies in mood and atmosphere rather than high-concept risks. The review singled out the collaboration with SiR on "Brown Sugah" for its warm, sensual production and lived-in vocal delivery, describing the track's sound as evocative of "Florida humidity" and praising the pair's conversational interplay.

In a review for Rated R&B, Keithan Samuels described Lucky You as a "dimly lit soundscape" designed to envelop listeners in "late-night intimacy" throughout its fifteen-minute duration. He highlighted the song "God Is Real," commending Falls' use of falsetto set against acoustic guitar and piano accompaniment. Rated R&B characterized the track as a "spiritually infused love song" and noted it as one of the EP's most emotionally resonant moments.

== Track listing ==
Lucky You track listing
No.	Title	Writer(s)	Length
1.	"Brown Sugah" (featuring SiR)	Isaiah Falls; Sir Darryl Farris	2:50
2.	"God Is Real"	Isaiah Falls	2:12
3.	"Just a Dream" (featuring Alex Isley)	Isaiah Falls; Alexandra Isley	2:21
4.	"Enticing" (featuring Chase Shakur)	Isaiah Falls; Chase Shakur	2:34
5.	"Butterflies" (featuring Joyce Wrice)	Isaiah Falls; Joyce Wrice	2:43
6.	"Have My Babies?"	Isaiah Falls	2:03
Total length:			14:44
