= Tycoon (album) =

2025 studio album by Ty Dolla Sign

Studio album by Ty Dolla Sign
- Released: October 17, 2025
- Genres: Hip-hop; R&B
- Length: 41:32
- Label: Atlantic
- Producers: 206Derek; 6cppo; AJ Williams; Anthony Kilhoffer; BabyXD; BbyKobe; Bizness Boi; Bnyx; Boys Noize; Caleb Bryant; Camper; Casper; Charlie Hallock; Chrishan; Damn James!; Dre Moon; Eurohead; FBG Goat; Fortune; Hitmaka; Joony; Juicy J; Kacpie; Laf Collective; Lasik; Matty Spats; Mustard; Outtatown; RobOnBass; Rosen Beatz; Skarp V; SkipOnDaBeat; Star Boy; Steven Shaeffer; Str8cash; Sucuki; Taurus; Tenroc; TheBlindsideDuo; TheLabCook; Varg²™; Wax Motif; YB; Ye

Ty Dolla Sign chronology
| Vultures 2 (2024) | Tycoon (2025) | Girl Music Vol. 1 (2026) |

Singles from Tycoon
- 1. "All In" Released: June 6, 2025; 2. "Smile Body Pretty Face" Released: September 26, 2025; 3. "Show Me Love" Released: October 10, 2025

Tycoon (stylized in all caps) is the fourth studio album by American rapper and singer Ty Dolla Sign. It was released on October 17, 2025, through Atlantic Records, and is his first solo album in five years since Featuring Ty Dolla Sign (2020). The album features guest appearances by Quavo, Juicy J, ASAP Rocky, Tommy Revenge, Kodak Black, YG, Tory Lanez, Young Thug, Lil Baby, 2 Chainz, Tyga, Lil Wayne, Rich the Kid, Destroy Lonely, Travis Scott, Leon Thomas, and Chlöe.

Tycoon was supported by the three singles "All In", "Smile Body Pretty Face" featuring Kodak Black and YG, and "Show Me Love" featuring Tory Lanez. Ty said of the title, "A tycoon is a boss. It came from a Japanese word 'tycoon,' which means 'great lord.' It's the same thing—great boss, the best at your craft". However, the album failed to debut on the US Billboard 200, only selling 7,900 album equivalent-units in its first week, marking it as Ty Dolla $ign's first failing album to ever do so, but did debut at 94 in Australia (ARIA).

== Background ==
Ty Dolla Sign collaborated with Kanye West on the 2024 albums Vultures 1 and Vultures 2. On February 8, 2025, Ye received public condemnation and backlash for his antisemitic rants on the platform X (formerly known as Twitter), including declaring of being a Nazi, and praising Adolf Hitler. Ty posted to his Instagram story, "I do not condone ANY form of hate speech against ANYONE", not name-dropping Ye. This caused a falling out between the two, with Ye claiming the label told Ty what to say, and would "never apologize" for his comments.

In an interview with Complex, Ty stated how he gave tracks to the Vultures project that were intended for his solo album. While the status of their relationship remains undetermined, Ye attended the Tycoon album listening party in Los Angeles.

== Release and promotion ==
Ty shared in an interview with Billboard that he "put [his] all" in Tycoon, where fans could expect to "see the growth, the musicality, and it's going to be better than anything that's coming out".

On September 8, 2025, Ty wiped his Instagram account and posted the album trailer. Set in black and white, the narrator explains the meaning behind the word 'tycoon' and concluded with the words, "When I asked, they left me nothing, for greed had consumed them, but they made a crucial mistake: They mistook my sympathy for grace".

=== Singles ===
The album's lead single, "All In", was released on June 6, 2025. He performed it on Jimmy Kimmel Live!. The next single, "Smile Body Pretty Face", was released on September 26, 2025, and featured rappers Kodak Black and YG. The accompanying music video premiered the same day, directed by Camera man. The album's third and final single, "Show Me Love" featuring Tory Lanez, was released on October 10, 2025.

== Critical reception ==
Professional ratings
Review scores
| Source | Rating |
|---|---|
| Beats per Minute | 75% |
| Rating Games Music | 80% |

Mary Chiney of Beats per Minute opined how the stack of guest features never outshone Ty Dolla Sign, praising how he "shapes the environment, and the guests orbit it". She stated that although there were sequencing issues and some tracks were repetitive to his earlier works, the project "never loses shape, his ear for detail keeps it afloat".

== Commercial performance ==
Tycoon failed to chart on the Billboard 200 and moved 7,900 units in its first-week. In Australia, the album reached 94 on the Australian Albums Chart, faring greater success at number 19 on its Hip-Hop/R&B albums chart.

== Track listing ==
Standard edition
| No. | Title | Writer(s) | Producer(s) | Length |
|---|---|---|---|---|
| 1. | "Can't Be Fucked With" | Tyrone Griffin, Jr.; Christopher Dotson | Ty Dolla Sign; Chrishan; LAF Collective; Eurohead; Varg²™ | 2:43 |
| 2. | "Don't Kill the Party" (featuring Quavo and Juicy J) | Griffin; Quavious Marshall; Jordan Houston; Benjamin Saint-Fort; Derek Anderson; Matthew Spatola; Kobe Hood | Ty Dolla Sign; Bnyx; 206Derek; Juicy J; Matty Spats; Lasik; Ye | 2:12 |
| 3. | "December 31st" (featuring ASAP Rocky and Tommy Revenge) | Griffin; Rakim Mayers; Tommy Revenge; Christian Ward; Dotson; Andre Robertson; Tim Friedrich; Rodney Montreal; Carson Hackney | Hitmaka; Chrishan; Hackney; Bizness Boi; Sucuki; Fortune; Camper | 2:54 |
| 4. | "Smile Body Pretty Face" (featuring Kodak Black and YG) | Griffin; Bill Kapri; Keenon Jackson; Dotson; Moritz Wagner; Sabinus Megwa; Severin Krohz; Martell Smith-Williams; Will Carr-Halper; Rafael Bautista; Morning Estrada; Rob Burge-Debose | FBG Goat; BabyXD; Kacpie; TheBlindsideDuo; Camper; Chrishan; Bautista; RobOnBass | 4:41 |
| 5. | "Show Me Love" (featuring Tory Lanez) | Griffin; Daystar Peterson; Dotson; Edgar Ferrera; Ward; Ronald Harris; Jason Boyd | SkipOnDaBeat; Hitmaka | 2:07 |
| 6. | "Tycoons" (featuring Young Thug and Lil Baby) | Griffin; Jeffery Williams; Dominique Jones; Smith-Williams; Jason Rosenberg; Carr-Halper | FBG Goat; BeatsByRRoze; BabyXD; Camper | 2:44 |
| 7. | "All In" | Griffin; Steven Marsden; Von Wayne Charles; Alexander Ridha; Daniel Chien; Jazzaé De Waal; Jonathan Negero; Israel Houghton II; Steven Shaeffer; Charlie Hallock | Ty Dolla Sign; Wax Motif; Boys Noize; Hallock; Shaeffer; Joony | 2:16 |
| 8. | "Twitch" (featuring 2 Chainz and Tyga) | Griffin; Tauheed Epps; Michael Stevenson; Chien; Andre Proctor; Hood | Ty Dolla Sign; BbyKobe; Dre Moon; Wax Motif | 2:48 |
| 9. | "What I Want" (featuring Lil Wayne) | Griffin; Dwayne Carter; Dijon McFarlane; Feliciano Ponce; Jorge Cardoso; Luzian Tuetsch; Alexander Izquierdo; Larry Sanders | Ty Dolla Sign; Mustard; LAF Collective; Eskeerdo; Larry Jayy | 2:35 |
| 10. | "Say It" | Griffin; Dotson; Ward; Smith-Williams; Chien; Jonas Rönnberg; Hessman; Justice Ude; Viktor Strand; James Royo; Malachi Haden; Caleb Bryant; Anthony Kilhoffer; Ant Clemons | Ty Dolla Sign; Hitmaka; Chrishan; FBG Goat; Wax Motif; Varg²™; Eurohead; 6cppo; Skarp V; Damn James!; YB; Bryant; Kilhoffer; AJ Williams | 2:25 |
| 11. | "On Repeat" (featuring Rich the Kid and Destroy Lonely) | Griffin; Dimitri Roger; Bobby Sandimanie III; Bautista; Grant Dickinson; Rönnberg; Hessman; Smith-Williams; Strand; Ude | Ty Dolla Sign; Bautista; TheLabCook; FBG Goat; Varg²™; Eurohead; Skarp V; 6cppo | 1:51 |
| 12. | "Harder" | Griffin; Dotson; Rönnberg; Bautista; Jason Cornet; Hessman; Strand | Ty Dolla Sign; Chrishan; Varg²™; Eurohead; Skarp V; TenRoc; Camper^{[a]} | 2:37 |
| 13. | "Mixed Emotions" (featuring Leon Thomas) | Griffin; Leon Thomas; Jacques Webster II; Smith-Williams; De Waal; Taurus Currie; Julio Mejia; Brian Campi; Ridha; Chien | Ty Dolla Sign; Taurus; Casper; FBG Goat; Boys Noize^{[a]}; Jwls^{[a]}; Wax Motif^{[a]} | 4:03 |
| 14. | "Wit It" (featuring Chlöe) | Griffin; Chloe Bailey; Darhyl Camper; Dotson; Rönnberg; Hessman; Strand; Andrew Neely; Tobias Dekker; Anton Mendo | Camper; Varg²™; Eurohead; Skarp V; Str8cash; Outtatown; Star Boy | 2:33 |
| 15. | "I Wish" | Griffin; Camper; Theron Thomas; Ray Vaughan | Ty Dolla Sign; Camper; Peter Lee Johnson; ^{[a]}; Varg²™^{[a]}; Eurohead^{[a]}; Skarp V^{[a]} | 2:56 |
| Total length: | | | | 41:32 |

Digital bonus tracks
| No. | Title | Writer(s) | Producer(s) | Length |
|---|---|---|---|---|
| 16. | "Blind Date" | Griffin; Christian Ward; Edgar Ferrera | Hitmaka; SkipOnDaBeat |
| 17. | "Thousand Miles" | Griffin; Vanessa Carlton; Skinbone | Digital Nas; Ron Fair; Curtis Schweitzer; Peter Lee Johnson |

Notes

- All tracks stylized in all caps.

Sample credits

- "All In" samples "No Letting Go", written by Steven Marsden and Von Wayne Charles, as performed by Wayne Wonder.
- "Mixed Emotions" features uncredited vocals by Travis Scott.
- "Thousand Miles" is a cover of "A Thousand Miles", written and performed by Vanessa Carlton.

== Charts ==
Chart performance for Tycoon
| Chart (2025) | Peak position |
|---|---|
| Australian Albums (ARIA) | 94 |
| Australia Hip-Hop/R&B Albums (ARIA) | 19 |
