= Jordan Ward =

American singer-songwriter

- Ward in 2023
- Born: Jordan Alexander Ward; St. Louis, Missouri, U.S.
- Occupations: Singer; dancer; songwriter
- Years active: 2017–present
- Musical career
- Genres: R&B; hip hop
- Label: Interscope
- Website: jordanward.world

Jordan Alexander Ward is an American singer, songwriter, and dancer. He began his career as a dancer before transitioning to music. Ward launched his professional music career in 2017. In 2023, Ward released his debut studio album, Forward. Ward was nominated in 2024 for the NAACP Image Award for Outstanding New Artist at the 55th NAACP Image Awards.

== Early life ==
Jordan Ward was raised in St. Louis, Missouri. From a young age, he exhibited a strong passion for the arts, particularly dance and music.

== Career ==
=== Dancing career ===
Jordan studied dance, including ballet, jazz, and hip-hop, throughout his teens. Before venturing into music, Jordan Ward established himself as a dancer, training and performing with various dance companies and in numerous stage productions. After graduating from high school, he moved to Los Angeles, where he worked as a backup dancer, touring with artists including Justin Bieber, Becky G, Janet Jackson, Usher, and Beyoncé.

=== Music career ===
Ward began writing and recording his songs in 2017. His background in dance significantly influenced his musical style, allowing him to incorporate it into his performances. In 2017, Jordan Ward released his debut project, A Peak at the Summit. Following this, he released several singles, including "Mustard" featuring 6LACK.

In October 2021, he released an EP titled Remain Calm. Ward released his debut album, Forward, in March 2023 under Interscope Records. The album, which was executive produced by Lido, features collaborations with Joyce Wrice, Ryan Trey, Gwen Bunn, and Joony. Upon its release, Forward charted on the US Billboard R&B Chart in its debut week. Rolling Stone included Forward in its list of The 100 Best Albums of 2023. In August 2023, he released a deluxe edition to the album, titled Moreward(Forward).

In the fourth quarter of 2023, he toured throughout Europe. Ward was nominated for the NAACP Image Award for Outstanding New Artist at the 55th NAACP Image Awards. Ward performed at the 2024 BET Experience festival, held at the Crypto.com Arena on June 28, 2024. Ward also performed at the Music at the Intersection Festival in St. Louis. In April 2024, he released the single "Player Two" from the soundtrack for Don't Tell Mom the Babysitter's Dead. On September 11, 2025 Ward released the single 'JUICY’ produced by Michael Uzowuru and Teo Halm.

== Musical style and influences ==
Ward's music is inspired by funk, alternative rock, and hip hop.

== Discography ==
=== Studio albums ===
- Forward (2023)
- Backward (2026)

=== Mixtapes ===
- Valley Hopefuls (2019)

=== EPs ===
- A Peak at the Summit (2017)
- Remain Calm (2021)
- Jrny (with Joony) (2024)

=== Singles ===
- "Tapas"
- "Lalaland"
- "Candid"
- "Holdin Me Back"
- "Okok" (Hibachi)
- "Sandiego"
- "Lil Baby Crush"
- "IDC" featuring Joony
- "White Crocs" featuring Ryan Trey
- "Cherimoya"
- "Mustard" with 6lack
- "Waiting in Vain"
- "Player Two"
- "Juicy"
- "Smokin Potna" featuring Sailorr

== Awards and nominations ==
Year	Event	Category	Result	Ref
2023	NAACP Image Awards	NAACP Image Award for Outstanding New Artist	Nominated	

== Tours ==
Headlining

- Teurward (2023) (EU)

Supporting

- 6LACK - "Since I Have a Lover" Tour (2023)
- Smino - "Louphoria" Tour (2023) (EU)
- JID & Smino - "Luv Is 4Ever" Tour (2023)
- Duckwrth - "SuperGood" Tour (2021)
