= Isaiah Falls =

American singer

- Born: Isaiah Falls; Orlando, Florida, U.S.
- Education: Dr. Phillips High School
- Genres: R&B; Southern hip-hop
- Occupations: Singer; songwriter; producer
- Instruments: Vocals; keyboards
- Years active: 2020–present
- Label: LVRS ONLY

Isaiah Falls is an American singer from Orlando, Florida. He is best known for his 2024 single "Florida Baby". In September 2024, He was named Billboard's R&B/Hip-Hop Rookie of the Month.

== Life and career ==
Isaiah Falls was born in Orlando, Florida, and grew up in a musical household. His father was a drummer and his mother was a singer, and both were Christian artists and music executives. They attended church regularly. Falls is the youngest of six siblings. He also took an interest in painting and creative direction as a child. At 14, Falls' mother bought him a laptop from a pawn shop, and he used it to learn music production with FL Studio. He began producing his own music and rapping with his brothers. And grew up listening to Southern hip-hop, particularly music by OutKast, Ludacris, Trick Daddy and Trina.

Falls began releasing music in 2017. He recalled that recording music helped him realise that he had potential as an artist, saying, "I’m actually decent at this." In 2019, he quit his job to pursue music full-time. In 2023, Falls released his debut extended play, The Private Room, Through his label LVRS ONLY.

On August 5, 2024, Falls released the single titled "Florida Baby" through his independent label LVRS ONLY. To promote the single, he performed it in a live session for Vevo DSCVR Artists to Watch, released YouTube. On May 24, 2024, Falls released his second extended play, Drugs n’ Lullabies. noting that Ep reflected his transition from "just a songwriter" to a more complete artist-producer, as he began creating beats and instrumentation himself during its development.

On May 2, 2025, Falls released LVRS Paradise (Side A), as the first part of a double-disc debut. The album features Ambré, Odeal, and Joyce Wrice, To promote the album, Falls embarked on a concert tour titled the LVRS Paradise Tour on June 2, 2025. The tour visited North America, and Europe. In October 2025, he released his third extended play, Lucky You, featuring fellow American artists SiR, Alex Isley, Chase Shakur and Joyce Wrice.

On July 30, 2026, Falls released (Side B) of his album LVRS Paradise, featuring 03 Greedo, Yakiyn, Loose Kannon, Mahalia, Takeoff and LateNightJiggy.

== Discography ==
=== Studio albums ===
List of studio albums
Title	Album details	Year released
LVRS Paradise (Side A) & (Side B)	Number of Tracks: 21; Label: LVRS ONLY, Roc Nation; Formats: Streaming, digital download	2025, 2026

=== Extended plays ===
List of EPs
Title	Music Details	Year released
The Private Room	Number of Tracks: 5; Formats: Streaming, digital download	2023
Drugs n' Lullabies	Number of Tracks: 12; Label: LVRS ONLY; Formats: Streaming, digital download	2024
Lucky You	Number of Tracks: 6; Label: LVRS ONLY; Formats: Streaming, digital download	2025

== Listicle ==
Publisher	Year	Listicle	Result	Ref.
Billboard	2024	R&B/Hip-Hop Rookie of the Month	Honored	
