= Ino Casablanca =

French musical artist

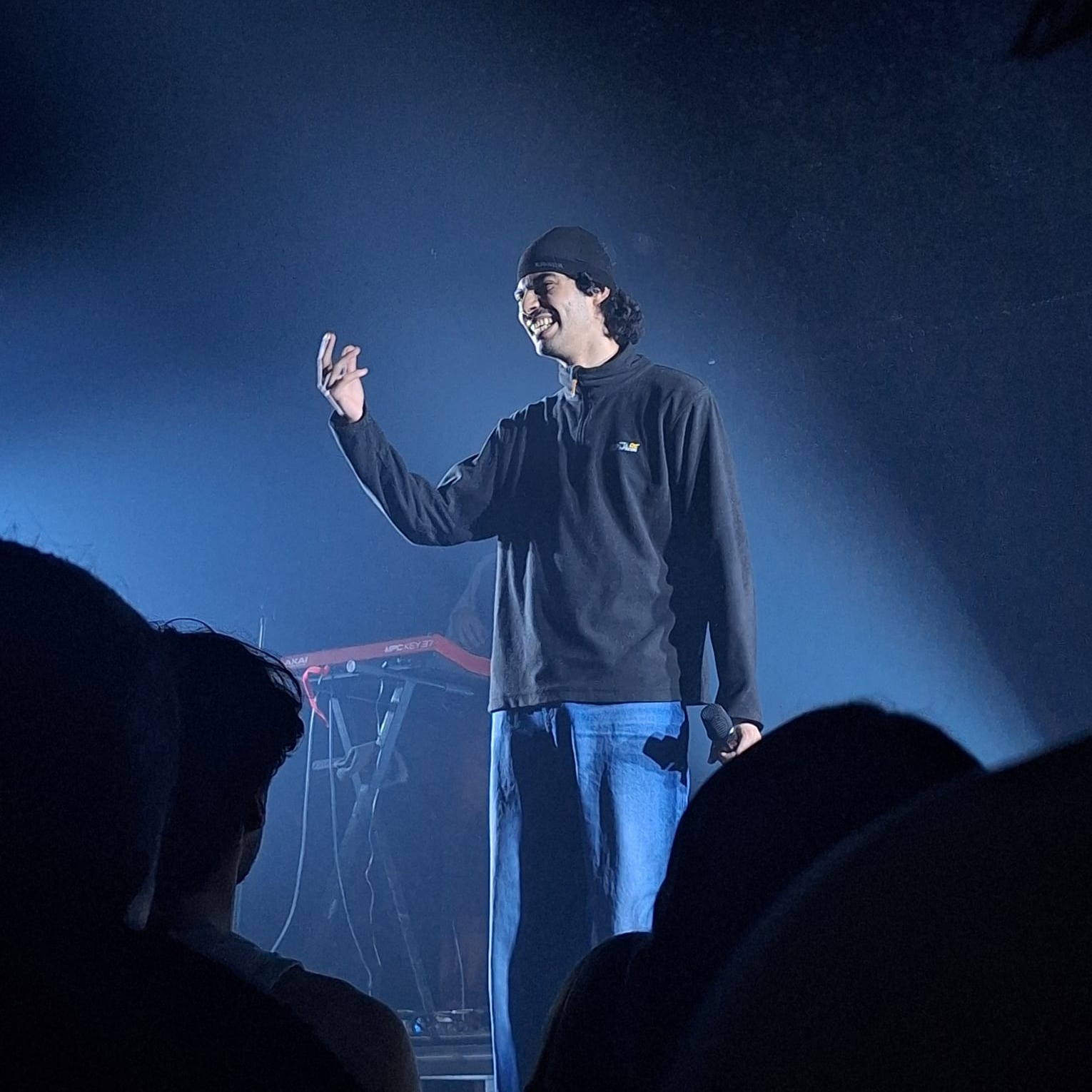

Background information
- Genres: Urban; R&B
- Occupation: Singer-songwriter
- Label: LCS Recordz

Ino Casablanca (born August 2000) is a French rapper and singer-songwriter.

He spent the first part of his youth in Catalonia (Spain) before moving to France. From a family of Moroccan origin, he draws on his multicultural background to create a musical universe with Hispanic and North African influences. He first gained recognition with his early EPs, Demna (October 2022) and Tamara (January 2025).

His profile rose further with the release of his third project, Extasia, in October 2025. In 2026, he was nominated in the Breakthrough Male Artist category at the 2026 Victoires de la Musique.

== Early life ==
Ino Casablanca was born in Spain to Moroccan parents and grew up in Vilafranca, on the outskirts of Barcelona.

He started music at the age of four with a violin given to him by a family friend, and went on to study at a conservatory. His father, a truck driver and butcher shop owner, has been a source of inspiration for him.

Following the 2008 financial crisis, his father's business closed and the family moved to Montauban. In his teenage years, he took up rap and taught himself music production using FL Studio software, drawing inspiration from YouTube. After finishing high school in Toulouse, he began studying chemistry and physics, which he later put aside to focus on music.

== Discography ==
EPs

- Demna (2022)
- Tamara (2025)
- Extasia (2025)
- Extasiaaaaa (2026)
