= Valley Girl Problems =

EP by Kylie Cantrall
- Released: July 24, 2026
- Recorded: November 2025 – June 2026
- Studio: SessionsAtlanta (Atlanta)
- Genres: Pop; dance-pop
- Length: 17:41
- Labels: Republic; Artist Partner; Heroine
- Producers: Tricky Stewart; Sermstyle; Ben Parris; JerkPoP; Kylie Cantrall; BKAI

Kylie Cantrall chronology
| B.O.Y. (2025) | Valley Girl Problems (2026) |

Singles from Valley Girl Problems
- 1. "Carrie Bradshaw" Released: April 10, 2026; 2. "Closet" Released: July 24, 2026

Valley Girl Problems is the second extended play (EP) by American actress and singer-songwriter Kylie Cantrall, released on July 24, 2026. The EP marks her major label debut following Cantrall's signing to Republic Records.

The album's first single, "Carrie Bradshaw", was released April 10, 2026. In an interview with People, Cantrall describes Valley Girl Problems as her step into a 'new era' or reintroduction as a step away from her Disney Channel acting career.

== Background and recording ==
In an interview with Galore Magazine, Cantrall details the process of writing Valley Girl Problems, stating "I wrote this album like a diary"; and following her romantic and friendship breakups with actors Malachi Barton and Malia Baker—which occurred during the writing of many songs off of Valley Girl—she notes that the hurt and betrayal she felt are present in many of the songs. Cantrall hadn't planned for the album to be the way it turned out to be. According to Cantrall, she had a whole title and concept, but because of the aforementioned events, she began to write more emotional pieces.

== Track listing ==
Valley Girl Problems track listing
| No. | Title | Writer(s) | Producers | Length |
|---|---|---|---|---|
| 1. | "Grwm" | Kylie Cantrall; Tricky Stewart; Lisa Scinta; Jim Lavigne; Sermstyle; Ben Parris | Stewart; Sermstyle; Parris | 1:00 |
| 2. | "Valley Girl Problems" | Cantrall; Scinta | Stewart; Parris | 1:15 |
| 3. | "Closet" | Cantrall; Tayla Parx; Stewart; Scinta; Lavigne; Blush; Parris; Camara Alford; Isak Swing; Roy C; Prince Markie Dee; Cory Rooney; Audio Two; Jeff Bass; Eminem | Stewart; JerkPoP; Parris | 2:26 |
| 4. | "The Problem (Interlude)" | Cantrall | Cantrall | 0:21 |
| 5. | "Carrie Bradshaw" | Cantrall; Parx; Stewart; Parris; Scinta; Lavigne | Stewart; Parris | 2:54 |
| 6. | "The Answer (Interlude)" | Cantrall; Parx; Stewart; Parris; Scinta; Lavigne | Cantrall; Stewart; Parris | 0:36 |
| 7. | "Girls Like U" | Cantrall; Parx; Scinta; Lavigne; Stewart; Parris; Korey B Roberson; Brian Gregory Thomas; Nico Baran; Goo Bon Jeong | Stewart; Parris; BKAI | 3:07 |
| 8. | "Yuck!" | Cantrall; Parx; Scinta; Stewart; Parris | Stewart; Parris | 2:28 |
| 9. | "Space Between" | Cantrall; Jonas Jeberg; Scinta; Lavigne; Stewart; Parris | Stewart; Parris | 3:39 |
| Total length: | | | | 17:41 |

== Personnel by track ==
(Via Apple Music credits)
| Contributor | Performance | Composition | Production |
|---|---|---|---|
| Camara Alford | | 3 | |
| Bianca "Blush" Atterberry | 4,6 | 3 | |
| Nicolas Baran | 7 | 7 | 7 |
| BKAI | 7 | | 7 |
| B'Nard | 7 | | 7 |
| Kylie Cantrall | All | 2,4,5 | 4,6 |
| Roy C Hammond | | 3 | |
| Jens Christian Isaksen | | 3 | |
| Jonas Jeberg | | 9 | 9 |
| Goo Bon Jeong | | 7 | |
| JerkPoP | | | 3 |
| James LaVigne | | 1,3,6,7,9 | |
| Jim Lavigne | | 5 | |
| Richard Ledesma | | | 3,5,7,8,9 |
| Tomi Martin | 5 | | |
| Mark Morales | | 3 | |
| Benjamin Parris | 1,2,3,5,7,8,9 | 1,3,5,6,7,8,9 | 2,5,6,7,8,9 |
| Tayla Parx | | 3,5,6,7,8 | 3,7,8 |
| Korey B. Roberson | | 7 | |
| Kirk Robinson | | 3 | |
| Nathaniel Robinson | | 3 | |
| Mark Rooney | | 3 | |
| Jamie Micheal Robert Sanderson | | 1 | |
| Lisa Scinta | | 1,2,3,5,6,7,8,9 | 2 |
| Christopher A. Stewart "Tricky Stewart" | 1,3,5,7 | 1,3,5,6,7,8,9 | All |
| Theevoni | 7 | | 7 |
| Brian Gregory Thomas | | 7 | |
