= MT Jones =

English singer

MT Jones is an English singer from Liverpool. He appeared on Jo Whiley's "Sofa Session" in November 2025.

Jones performed at Liverpool Sound City on 3 May 2025.
