= Jae Stephens =

American singer (born 1997)

- Born: Jordan Adkison; 18 July 1997 (age 29); Dallas, Texas, US
- Origin: Los Angeles, California
- Genres: R&B, pop
- Occupations: Singer; songwriter; record producer
- Instrument: Vocals
- Years active: 2017–present
- Labels: Raedio; Def Jam

Jordan Adkison, known professionally as Jae Stephens (born 18 July 1997) is an American singer, songwriter, and record producer. Originally from Dallas, Texas, and raised in Pasadena, California, she initially gained popularity on the microblogging platform Tumblr before launching her music career professionally. She is known for her musical style, which blends 2000s R&B nostalgia with futuristic pop elements.

Stephens has released EPs F**k it i'll do it myself (2019), High My Name Is (2022), and the Sellout series (2024–2025). Her debut studio LP came out in 2026 and was titled Audacity. Beyond her solo career, she is a songwriter, having penned tracks for artists such as Jennifer Lopez, Normani, Latto, and Sinéad Harnett.

== Early life ==
Stephens was born in Dallas, Texas. At the age of six, her family moved to Pasadena, California, where she grew up in an artistic environment. She attended a performing arts high school, taking classes in singing, dance, and acting. As a child, Stephens and her brother acted in commercials and on the Disney Channel.

During her teenage years, she built a significant following on Tumblr under the username "beyoncebeytwice," accumulating over 200,000 followers. On the platform, she shared song covers, life updates, and humorous content. She attended Los Angeles County High School for the Arts, where studied vocal performance. After graduating from high school, she briefly lived in London before returning to the Los Angeles area, where she began working as a songwriter.

== Career ==
=== 2017–2021: Beginnings and F**k it i'll do it myself ===
Stephens began her musical career working as a songwriter.

Stephens released her debut single "24K" in 2017, which received attention from outlets such as The Fader. The following year, Jae was featured on the track "3AM" alongside Baauer and AJ Tracey. In 2019, unsatisfied with waiting for external opportunities, she decided to self-produce and write her first EP titled F**k it i'll do it myself. The project included the single "Got It Like That". She performed alongside Khalid on Saturday Night Live in March 2019.

=== 2022–present: High My Name Is, Sellout series, and Audacity ===
Following a brief hiatus, Stephens participated in and won the creator campaign for Raedio, the record label founded by Issa Rae. This led to a joint signing with Raedio and Def Jam Recordings. In 2022, she released the EP High My Name Is.

She released her third EP, Sellout, in September 2024. She released a sequel, Sellout II, in August 2025 and a compilation EP, Total Sellout, in November 2025. Stephens served as the opening act for British group Flo on their 2025 North American Access All Areas Tour.

Her debut studio album, Audacity, was released on September 25, 2026.

== Artistry and influences ==
Stephens describes her music as a fusion of "futuristic R&B pop." She cites Beyoncé, Janet Jackson, Brandy, and Mariah Carey as her primary vocal and artistic influences. She has openly expressed her desire to occupy spaces traditionally limited for Black women in pop music, advocating for the creative freedom to be "mainstream" without losing authenticity. Stephens often tackle themes of relationships and love from a female perspective; keeping her options open on songs like "SMH" and giving up on love too easily on her song "Choosy". In an interview with Rolling Stone, Stephens said she has been told she "writes about men like they're disposable".

== Discography ==
=== Studio albums ===
- Audacity (2026)

=== Compilation albums ===
- Total Sellout (2025)

=== Extended plays ===
- F**k it i'll do it myself (2019)
- High My Name Is (2022)
- Sellout (2024)
- Sellout II (2025)

== Tours ==
Headlining

- The Sellout Tour (2026)

Supporting

- Flo – North American Access All Areas Tour (2025)
- Khalid - It’s Always Summer Somewhere Tour (2026)
- Tyla - A*POP World Tour (2026)

== Songwriting credits ==
In addition to her own music, Jae Stephens has co-written, written and produced songs for other artists, including:

- Chxrry - "Ride 4 Me" (2023)
- Jihyo - "Closer" (2023)
- Jennifer Lopez – "Rebound" (feat. Anuel AA) (2024)
- Loossemble – "Secret Diary" (2024)
- Kylie Cantrall - "See U Tonight" (feat. Illit) (2025)
