= Tiwayo =

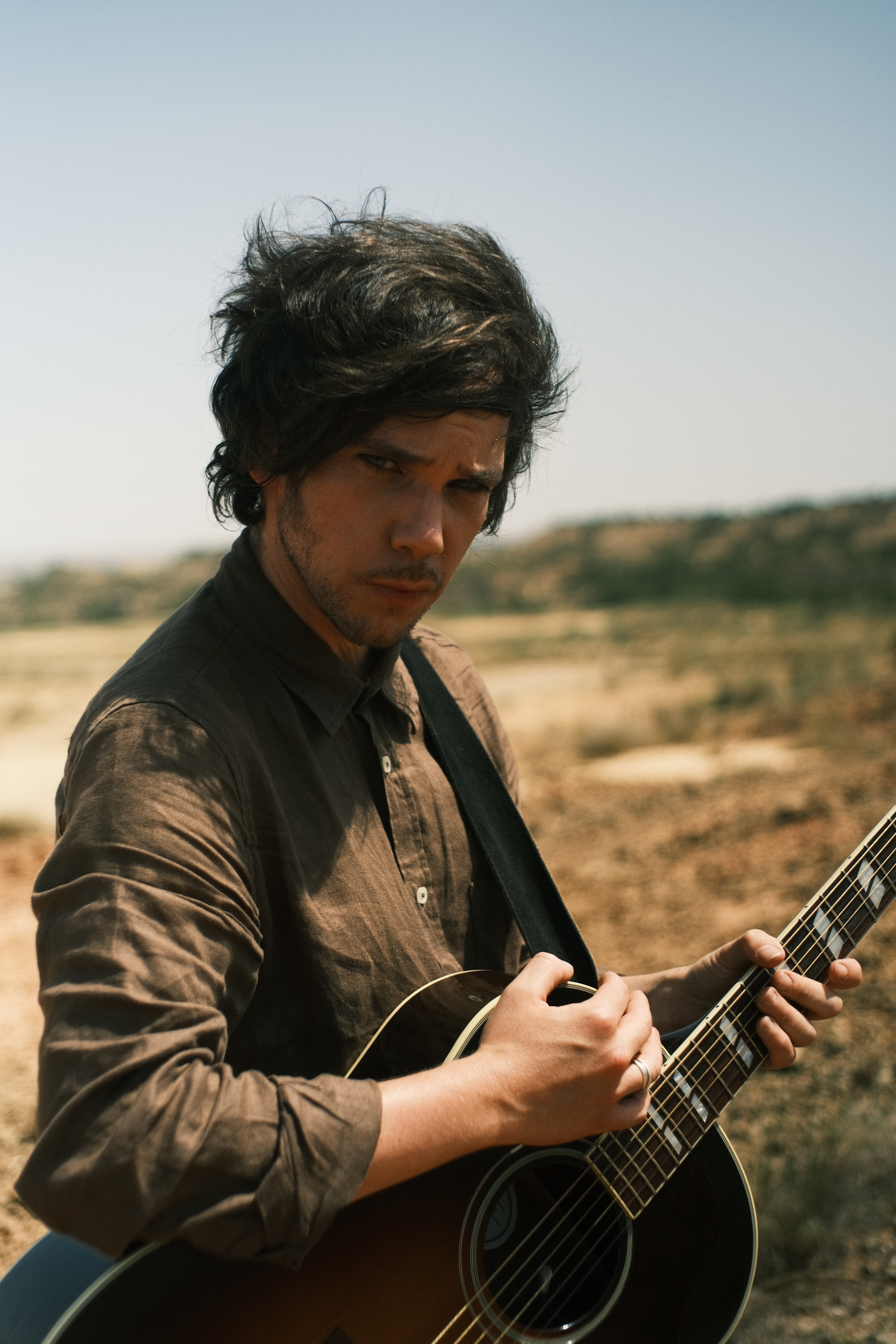
- Tiwayo in 2023

Background information
- Born: Paris, France
- Genres: Soul · Blues · Folk · Gospel
- Occupation: Singer · Songwriter · Musician
- Instrument: Vocals · Guitar
- Years active: 2010s–present
- Labels: Blue Note · Decca France · Yotanka Records
- Website: tiwayo.com

Tiwayo is a French singer, songwriter and musician from the Paris region. His stage name derives from the initials T.Y.O., meaning “The Young Old,” a nickname he adopted during travels in the United States.

== Career ==
His debut album, The Gypsy Soul of Tiwayo, was released in 2019 by Blue Note/Decca France. Belgian broadcaster RTBF's Classic 21 described it as “a true discovery,” highlighting its mix of soul, blues and rock. French magazine Rolling Stone wrote that the single “Wild” revived elements of traditional soul for a contemporary audience.

His second album, Desert Dream, was released in April 2023 through Time and Place Records, licensed to Yotanka Records. Swiss broadcaster RTS presented it as an intimate work inspired by the American desert, and compared its atmosphere to Bruce Springsteen's Nebraska. The album was also covered by France Inter in programmes including Côté Club and Musicaline. France Bleu described the record as “an album that breathes the soul of the blues”.

Tiwayo's work has been broadcast on several European cultural stations, including RTS Suisse, RTBF International, MDR Kultur and Deutschlandfunk Kultur.

== Music style ==
Tiwayo's music has been described as a combination of soul, folk and blues. RTBF noted the influence of Memphis soul and Mississippi blues on his debut album. RTS characterised his second album as more stripped-down and introspective, influenced by 1960s and 1970s gospel, soul and rock. France Bleu associated Desert Dream with the traditions of blues and soul.

Rolling Stone France commented that “Wild” reintroduced classic soul elements in a modern context. Reviews in outlets such as Paris-Move and Rock’n’Reviews have also discussed his vocal delivery and songwriting in relation to contemporary soul and folk-blues.

== Discography ==
=== Studio albums ===
- The Gypsy Soul of Tiwayo (2019, Blue Note/Decca Records France)
- Desert Dream (2023, Time and Place Records / Yotanka Records)
