= Solar Eclipse (Drake song) =

2026 song by Drake featuring Don Toliver

Song by Drake featuring Don Toliver

from the album Habibti
- Released: October 2, 2026
- Genre: R&B; trap-soul
- Length: 3:38
- Label: OVO; Republic
- Songwriters: Aubrey Graham; Caleb Toliver; Noel Cadastre; Ella Langley; Miranda Lambert; Luke Dick; Joybeth Taylor; Bernard Freeman; Chad Butler; Joseph McVey; Jay Jenkins; Shawn Carter; Leroy Williams
- Producer: Noel Cadastre

Music video
- "Solar Eclipse" on YouTube

"Solar Eclipse" is a song by Canadian rapper Drake from Habibti (FOMO), a reissue of his eleventh studio album Habibti (2026). Featuring American rapper Don Toliver, it interpolates "Choosin' Texas" by American country music singer Ella Langley and "Get Throwed" by Bun B featuring Pimp C, Z-Ro, Young Jeezy and Jay-Z.

== Background ==
"Solar Eclipse", alongside the other songs from the Habibti reissue, was previewed in his short film FOMO, which was premiered on YouTube on September 15, 2026. Drake had previously attended Langley's concert in Arkansas and played a portion of "Solar Eclipse" while DJing in Houston. Prior to the song's release, many assumed it was a remix to "Choosin' Texas". According to DJ Akademiks, Drake forfeited his publishing share of the song to help clear it for release, due to popular demand.

== Composition ==
The song was described by outlets as R&B and trap-soul; with both Drake and Don Toliver delivering melodic vocals. Drake flips the chorus of "Choosin' Texas" with his own lyrics, in which he sings about having sex with a cowgirl. He name-checks various people and places from Texas (Johnny Manziel, College Station, River Oaks, Sugar Land, Texas, Pearland and the Woodlands), and calls back to his song "Spider-Man Superman" with PartyNextDoor from their album Some Sexy Songs 4 U. Don Toliver shouts out to Fort Bend County and Katy, while in his verse he references his album Octane, describes the aftermath of a sexual encounter and hints at his risky lifestyle.

== Charts ==
Chart performance for "Solar Eclipse"
Chart (2026)	Peak position
Australia (ARIA)	48
Australia Hip Hop/R&B (ARIA)	5
Canada Hot 100 (Billboard)	6
Global 200 (Billboard)	8
Guatemala Anglo Airplay (Monitor Latino)	15
Ireland (IRMA)	48
New Zealand (Recorded Music NZ)	36
South Africa Streaming (TOSAC)	9
Sweden Heatseeker (Sverigetopplistan)	3
United Arab Emirates (IFPI)	11
UK Singles (Official Charts)	22
US Billboard Hot 100	5
US Hot R&B/Hip-Hop Songs (Billboard)	1
US Rhythmic Airplay (Billboard)	37
