= Habibti (album) =

Studio album by Drake
- Released: May 15, 2026
- Genre: R&B
- Length: 36:33
- Labels: OVO; Republic
- Producers: 20; 40; 2one2; 5ebas; Alex Lustig; Ambezza; APMelodies; B4U; Beam; DJ Frisco954; Eli Brown; Foreign Teck; Fashxn; Gordo; Hugo Mari; Jahaan Sweet; Joseph L'Étranger; London Cyr; Lucid; Mcevoy; Mike Wavvs; Nellz; Noel Cadastre; O Lil Angel; Ohh!; ProdbyTy; Prodkavin; RL Beats; Roark Bailey; Sakii; Saturdaystace; Sauceboy; Sean Turk; SkipOnDaBeat; Smash David; XYNothing; YMX Beats; Zach Geitner; Zecca

Drake chronology
Maid of Honour (2026)	Habibti (2026)

Singles from Habibti (FOMO)
- 1. "Cold Shoulder" Released: October 15, 2026

Habibti (Note: Arabic: حبيبتي, romanized: ḥabībatī, lit. 'My Beloved') (stylized in all caps) is the eleventh studio album by Canadian rapper Drake, released through OVO Sound and Republic Records on May 15, 2026, as a surprise album alongside Drake's ninth and tenth studio albums (Note: Despite their simultaneous release, the albums are sequentially ordered by their preceding singles; Iceman and Maid of Honour saw their preceding singles released on July 5 and July 25, 2025, respectively, whereas Habibti was not preceded by a single.) Iceman and Maid of Honour. The albums are a follow-up to Drake's collaborative album Some Sexy Songs 4 U (2025) and mark his first solo albums since For All the Dogs (2023).

Production for Habibti was handled by Drake's frequent collaborators, including 40, Gordo, and O Lil Angel, among others, and contains guest appearances from Qendresa, Sexyy Red, Loe Shimmy, and PartyNextDoor. The album is characterized by its slower, R&B-leaning aesthetic, and was not preceded by any singles. Similar to Drake's previous releases, lyrical themes include tainted romances, financial excess, and sexual relationships. The Habibti (FOMO) reissue of the album, featuring four additional tracks – including the song "Solar Eclipse" – was released on October 2, 2026, and contained guest appearances from Don Toliver and Yebba. "Solar Eclipse" debuted at number five on the Billboard Hot 100.

Habibti received mixed reviews from music critics, with praise for its atmosphere but criticism for some of its lyrics. It opened with first-week sales of 114,000 album-equivalent units in the United States and debuted at number two on the Billboard 200; with Iceman and Maid of Honour debuting at number one and three, respectively, Drake became the first artist ever to hold the top three spots on the Billboard 200 concurrently. Internationally, Habibti peaked in the top ten in several countries, including Australia, Canada, Portugal, New Zealand, and the United Kingdom.

== Background and promotion ==
Habibti was surprise released on May 15, 2026, alongside Maid of Honour, after the "Iceman: Episode 4" livestream a day prior. On May 18, the music video for "High Fives" was released. On September 15, Drake released the short film Fear of Missing Out, which included several music videos for songs from Habibti, Iceman, and Maid of Honour, and also premiered seven unreleased songs. On September 19, the music videos for "Classic", "I'm Spent" and "White Bone" were released. On October 2, four additional songs - "Solar Eclipse", "Quebec", "Cold Shoulder" and "Classic PT2" - were released as part of the Habibti (FOMO) reissue.

== Composition and themes ==
The album's title borrows an Arabic phrase that translates as "my love", "my darling", or "my beloved", and is typically considered a term of endearment. Habibti consists largely of R&B-leaning songs, contrasting the hip-hop sounds on Iceman and the club-oriented aesthetic of Maid of Honour. The runtime for its standard edition is 36 minutes, marking the shortest album from the three-album release and the shortest album in Drake's career.

The album features guest appearances from Qendresa, Sexyy Red, Loe Shimmy, and PartyNextDoor. "Solar Eclipse" contains a guest appearance from Don Toliver, and "Cold Shoulder" contains guest appearances from Toliver and Yebba. These songs mark Drake's first collaborations with Toliver.

== Critical reception ==
Professional ratings
Aggregate scores
Source	Rating
Metacritic	59/100
Review scores
Source	Rating
The Arts Desk	(Note: Score is shared with Iceman and Maid of Honour.)
Consequence	D
The Guardian	2/5 stars
NME	3.5/5 stars
Pitchfork	6.5/10
Rolling Stone	3.5/5 stars
The Sydney Morning Herald	1/5 stars

According to the review aggregator Metacritic, Habibti received "mixed or average reviews" based on a weighted average score of 59 out of 100 from 8 critic scores.

In a positive review, Jeff Ihaza for Rolling Stone praised the "fast-paced" nature and Florida-oriented production on "Rusty Intro", and also praised the production on "WNBA" and "Slap the City". Ihaza complimented Loe Shimmy's performance on "I'm Spent" and Drake's vulnerability and contemplative nature on "Prioritizing", concluding that the album "embrace[s] the R&B loverboy [persona] that audiences first came to love [Drake] for". Peter A. Berry for Variety called the album "slow, sensuous and sometimes irresistible" and complimented its production as "whispery intimacy". He also praised the performances on "Slap the City", "I'm Spent" and "Hurrr Nor Thurr" but criticized the lyrics on certain songs for lacking specificity and being too literal.

Pitchfork's Matthew Ritchie wrote Habibti is more personalized compared to Drake's previous releases, and called it "alternatingly hypnotic and hollow". He praised "Rusty Intro" for being "delirious [and] fast", the "tenderness" in Drake's performances on the intro of "WNBA" and across "High Fives", and the piano-laden production and chemistry between Drake and Loe Shimmy on "I'm Spent". However, he criticized "Hurr Nor Thurr" and "Classic" as "middle-of-the-road" and questioned some of the lyrics on "Slap the City" and "Gen 5", concluding the overall album is "unbalanced".

Kyann-Sian Williams for NME highlighted the album's "expensive, mood-setting" atmosphere and praised Loe Shimmy's appearance on "I'm Spent" for "injecting urgency into Drake's increasingly polished world". However, Williams concluded that the album "settle[s] for vague luxury melancholy". Consequence's Kiana Fitzgerald praised the "exacting clarity" of "Classic" and labelled "WNBA" as "predictable, but effective", and concluded that Habibti is "lost at sea" and panders to women. Writing for The Arts Desk, Thomas H. Green wrote that Habibti "is more sexy" than Iceman or Maid of Honour and described its atmosphere as "laid back and woozy", but criticized the album for its "drab odes [and Drake's] one-note desires" to women. Robert Moran for The Sydney Morning Herald also criticized the album and Drake's performances as being "charmless and self-pitying".

== Commercial performance ==
Within 24 hours of the triple-album release, Drake broke the record for being most-streamed artist in a single day in 2026 on Spotify and registered a 1,100% increase in simultaneous listeners on Apple Music, causing each streaming service to crash and suffer glitches due to the high listener demand; over 5,000 users reported issues with Spotify on the day of the triple-album release.

In the United States, Habibti debuted at number two on the Billboard 200 chart, selling 114,000 album-equivalent units. This consisted of 108,000 streaming-equivalent units (equaling 110.63 million on-demand official streams of the album's 11 tracks) and 6,000 pure album sales; cumulatively, Drake amassed 687,000 album-equivalent units sold in the US for the three albums in their first week. With Iceman and Maid of Honour debuting at number one and three, respectively, Drake became the first artist ever to hold the top three spots on the Billboard 200 concurrently. In its second week, Habibti sold 52,000 album-equivalent units, dropping to number seven on the Billboard 200, and in its third week, it sold 43,000 album-equivalent units, dropping to number eight on the Billboard 200. Following the release of Habibti (FOMO) reissue in October, the album re-peaked at #2 on the Billboard 200, selling 71,000 album-equivalent units. This propelled the album from number 116 on the chart and marked a 506% increase in its streams, lodging 70,000 streaming-equivalent units. Following the release of its deluxe edition, Habibti (FOMO), the album jumped to number one on the Billboard Top R&B/Hip-Hop Albums chart. This marked the rapper's 18th number-one album on the chart, breaking a tie with Future and The Temptations for the most number-one albums in the chart's history.

In the United Kingdom, Habibti opened at number seven on the UK Albums Chart, while Iceman reached number one and Maid of Honour opened at number six. This made Drake the first artist to debut three studio albums inside the UK top 10 simultaneously, and marked his fifteenth, sixteenth and seventeenth albums to debut in the UK top 10. In Australia, Habibti debuted at number six on the ARIA Charts, while Iceman reached number one and Maid of Honour opened at number five. The releases marked Drake's fourteenth, fifteenth and sixteenth Australian top 10 albums and made him the first artist to debut three new albums in the same week in the top 10. In New Zealand, Habibti debuted at number five on the New Zealand Albums Chart, while Iceman reached number one and Maid of Honour opened at number six.

== Track listing ==
Habibti track listing
No.	Title	Writer(s)	Producer(s)	Length
1.	"Rusty Intro"	Aubrey Graham; Bradley Baker; Octavian Godji	B4U; O Lil Angel; DJ Frisco954^{[a]}	1:02
2.	"WNBA"	Graham; Douglas Ford; Baker; Diamante Blackmon; Nik Frascona; Mathias Liyew; Francisco Zecca; Dominik Patrzek; Alexander Lustig; Kyle Nelson; Roark Bailey	B4U; Gordo; Nik D; Ambezza; Zecca; Deats; Alex Lustig; Nellz; Bailey	2:58
3.	"Slap the City" (featuring Qendresa)	Graham; Qendresa Sopa-Nishevci; Baker; Godji; Noel Cadastre; Gray Okenge; Lucien Dunne; Kanye West; Jeff Bhasker; Ernest Wilson	B4U; O Lil Angel; Cadastre; LA Slim^{[a]}; Lucid^{[a]}	3:22
4.	"High Fives"	Graham; Baker; Noah Shebib; Tyshane Thompson; Tyler Nguyen; Henry Tubman; Eliel Afari-Brown; Kavin Smith; Jimmy Nguyen; Reza Manohar; Zach Geitner; Franklin Cesark; Donald Meadows	B4U; 40; Beam; ProdbyTy; RL; Eli Brown; Prodkavin; Sakii; SaturdayStace; Geitner; 20	4:16
5.	"Hurrr Nor Thurrr" (featuring Sexyy Red)	Graham; Janae Wherry; John Tyszko; Caleb Odidi; Mbaoh Kerty; Edward Ferrell; Darren Lighty; Clifton Lighty; Balewa Muhammad; Anthony Hamilton; Veronica McKenzie	Young Troy	3:08
6.	"I'm Spent" (featuring Loe Shimmy)	Graham; Shamar Cox; Baker; Godji; Jahaan Sweet; Cole McEvoy-Morie; Joseph L'Étranger; Paul Beauregard; Jordan Houston	B4U; O Lil Angel; Sweet; Mcevoy; L'Étranger	2:24
7.	"Classic"	Graham; Thompson; Samuel Jiménez; Edgar Ferrera; Michael Hernandez; Hugo Mari; Ricky McNeal	Beam; Smash David; SkipOnDaBeat; Foreign Teck; Mari; APMelodies	2:59
8.	"Gen 5"	Graham; James Cyr; Jesse Gumer; Baker; Godji	London Cyr; 2one2; B4U^{[a]}; O Lil Angel^{[a]}	3:37
9.	"White Bone"	Graham; Baker; Afari-Brown; K. Smith; Phillip Campbell; Machado Joseph; James Wrighter	B4U; Eli Brown; Prodkavin; Sauceboy; XYNothing	4:57
10.	"Fortworth" (featuring PartyNextDoor)	Graham; Jahron Braithwaite; Cadastre; Kaushik Barua	Cadastre; Kid Masterpiece	3:57
11.	"Prioritizing"	Graham; Shebib	40	3:53
Total length:				36:33

Habibti (FOMO) additional track listing
No.	Title	Writer(s)	Producer(s)	Length
12.	"Solar Eclipse" (featuring Don Toliver)	Graham; Caleb Toliver; Cadastre; Ella Langley; Miranda Lambert; Luke Dick; Joybeth Taylor; Bernard Freeman; Chad Butler; Joseph McVey; Jay Jenkins; Shawn Carter; Leroy Williams	Cadastre	3:38
13.	"Quebec"	Graham; Baker; Thompson; Jiménez; James Wrighter	B4U; Beam; Smash David; Fashxn	2:10
14.	"Cold Shoulder" (featuring Don Toliver and Yebba)	Graham; Toliver; Abigail Smith; Baker; Godji; Cyr; Cesark; Oliver Stern	B4U; O Lil Angel; London Cyr; 20; Ohh!	3:54
15.	"Classic pt2"	Graham; Thompson; Jiménez; Ferrera; Hernandez; Mari; Paul; Cadastre; Sebastian Lopez	Beam; Smash David; SkipOnDaBeat; Foreign Teck; Mari; APMelodies; Cadastre	2:59
Total length:				49:14

=== Track notes ===
- Full credits are not available at this time for the songs "WNBA", "High Fives", "White Bone", "Quebec", and "Cold Shoulder".
- "Gen 5" and "Fortworth" feature additional vocals from Qendresa.

=== Sample and interpolation credits ===
- "Rusty Intro" contains an interpolation of the traditional Scottish song "The Parting Glass".
- "Slap the City" contains a sample of "Show Me a Good Time", written by Aubrey Graham, Kanye West, Jeff Bhasker, and Ernest Wilson, as performed by Drake.
- "Solar Eclipse" contains an interpolation of "Choosin' Texas", written by Ella Langley, Miranda Lambert, Luke Dick and Joybeth Taylor, as performed by Langley, and a sample of "Get Throwed", written by Bernard Freeman, Chad Butler, Joseph McVey, Jay Jenkins, Shawn Carter, and Leroy Williams, and performed by Bun B featuring Pimp C, Z-Ro, Young Jeezy, and Jay-Z.

== Charts ==
Chart performance for Habibti
Chart (2026)	Peak position
Australian Albums (ARIA)	5
Australian Hip Hop/R&B Albums (ARIA)	2
Austrian Albums (Ö3 Austria)	8
Belgian Albums (Ultratop Flanders)	17
Belgian Albums (Ultratop Wallonia)	22
Canadian Albums (Billboard)	1
Danish Albums (Hitlisten)	14
Dutch Albums (Album Top 100)	20
Finnish Albums (Suomen virallinen lista)	44
French Albums (SNEP)	29
German Albums (Offizielle Top 100)	36
Hungarian Albums (MAHASZ)	36
Irish Albums (Official Charts)	16
Italian Albums (FIMI)	64
Japanese Download Albums (Billboard Japan)	75
Lithuanian Albums (AGATA)	12
New Zealand Albums (RMNZ)	5
Nigerian Albums (TurnTable)	21
Norwegian Albums (IFPI Norge)	23
Portuguese Albums (AFP)	6
Spanish Albums (Promusicae)	38
Swedish Albums (Sverigetopplistan)	8
Swedish Hip-Hop Albums (Sverigetopplistan)	2
Swiss Albums (Schweizer Hitparade)	5
UK Albums (Official Charts)	7
UK R&B Albums (Official Charts)	7
US Billboard 200	2
US Top R&B/Hip-Hop Albums (Billboard)	1

== Release history ==
Release dates and formats for Habibti
Region	Date	Label(s)	Format(s)	Edition(s)	Ref.
Various	May 15, 2026	OVO; Republic	Digital download; streaming	Standard	
