= Cehryl =

American singer

cehryl
- Born: Cheryl Chow; Hong Kong
- Genres: R&B; Indie; Alternative R&B
- Instruments: Guitar, Piano, Bass
- Label: Nettwerk Records

Cheryl Chow, known professionally as Cehryl (stylised as cehryl), is a singer, songwriter, producer, film composer and instrumentalist based mainly in Hong Kong.

== Biography ==
Chow was born and grew up in Hong Kong. She played classical piano from a young age, and learned to play guitar on YouTube as a teenager. She studied music production and engineering at Berklee College of Music.

Her Wherever it May be Be EP was made start from finish in her bedroom in Boston before moving to Los Angeles. She has toured with Sports, Mac Ayres, Still Woozy and opened for Ravyn Lanae, Dijon Duenas and Raveena. Her tours with Jeremy Zucker and Cavetown were put on hold due to the COVID-19 pandemic. Her sophomore EP time machine was released in spring of 2021 with Nettwerk Records.

Her third LP willow tree was released with Nettwerk Records in 2024.

In late 2025, she independently released a 24 track electronica/ambient album titled You Win Some, You Lose A Lot.

Her fifth LP, Modern Music, was released in August 2026, as she found herself relocating from Hong Kong to London.

== Artistry ==
cehryl records, and produces all of her own tracks. Complex featured her as one of the "Best New Artists of the Month" in July 2019, describing her sound as "more A24 than Marvel."

Still Loud reported that it only took cehryl one and a half months to compose, write and produce the entirety of her second EP, Delusions.

Her song "angels (Emily)" was co-produced with Andrew Sarlo., a producer who has worked with artists such as Bon Iver and Big Thief.

== Discography ==
=== Albums ===
• Delusions (2016)

• Slow Motion (2019)

• willow tree (2024)

• You Win Some, You Lose A Lot (2025)

• Modern Music (2026)

=== EPs ===
• chamber music EP (2015)

• wherever it may be EP (2017)

• time machine (2021)

=== Guest appearances ===
| Title | Year | Other performer(s) | Label |
|---|---|---|---|
| "Hours" | 2017 | Frison | Artist Intelligence Agency, Pantheon |
| "Onwards" | 2017 | Flakes | Night Owl Collective |

== Notes ==
- http://thebaybridged.com/2018/06/05/the-multi-talented-cehryl-is-throwin-bos-june-centerpiece/
- http://www.nettwerk.com/news/2020/indie-rb-artist-cehryl-shares-new-track-and-diy-video%E2%80%82%E2%81%9F%E2%80%83%E2%80%83%E2%80%83%E2%80%86%E2%81%9F
- https://www.bandwagon.asia/articles/introducing-cehryl-rising-indie-artist-hong-kong-secret-signals-interview-december-2020
- https://hashtaglegend.com/culture/cehryl-cheryl-chow-rising-singer/
