= LVRS Paradise =

Studio album by Isaiah Falls
- Released: May 2, 2025 (Side A); July 31, 2026 (Side B)
- Recorded: 2024–2026
- Studio: Various
- Genre: R&B
- Length: 55:28
- Labels: LVRS ONLY; Roc Nation Distribution
- Producers: Blasian Chris; BLK ODYSSY; Channel WYA; Dylex Beats; Flozigg; G.Bliz; Icee Red; Isaiah Falls; Jake Still; Kaelin Ellis; LAGUNE; Luxury Lane; LVRS N FRNDS; Malik Ninety Five; Mike Hector; Phil Mango; prod.bymarco; Rami Sadawi; Sw8vy; TrulyAkira

LVRS Paradise (marketed in two parts as LVRS Paradise (Side A) and LVRS Paradise (Side B)) is the debut studio album by American singer-songwriter Isaiah Falls. The first half of the album was released on May 2, 2025, and the second half was released over a year later on July 31, 2026 by LVRS ONLY with distribution through Roc Nation. The album serves as a follow-up to his EP Drugs n' Lullabies (2024) and featured collaborations with Ambré, Odeal, Joyce Wrice, 03 Greedo, Mahalia and more.

The album's overall recording sessions took place from 2024 to 2026, with several record producers, including Blasian Chris, Channel WYA, Dylex Beats, Flozigg, G.Bliz, Icee Red, Jake Still, Kaelin Ellis, LAGUNE, Luxury Lane, LVRSNFRNDS, Malik Ninety Five, Mike Hector, and Phil Mango among others.

== Background and promotion ==
In April 2025, Falls announced that his double disc would be released in May 2025, alongside the release of the single "Butterflies", featuring Joyce Wrice. Falls stated that he had developed the title of the project four or five years prior to its release. And began working on album as a two-part project, Side A with nine tracks and Side B with another nine, each running under 20 minutes. According to Falls, the creative process for each side was very different. For the writing and recording of Side B, Falls and his team traveled to Los Angeles, where they worked collaboratively while staying at an Airbnb. He described the sessions as a group effort that encouraged greater experimentation, in contrast to the more individual process used for Side A.

Although released individually as extended plays, the two sides collectively constitute a double album that continues the moody R&B style of his 2024 release Drugs n' Lullabies. Falls stated that the record was intended to serve as "a safe place for lovers," centering on themes of intimacy and emotional vulnerability.

The album was supported by Falls' 2025 LVRS Paradise Tour, which began on July 1 at the Montreal International Jazz Festival. The North American leg included performances in cities such as Toronto, Chicago, and New York, and concluded on August 1 at The Independent in San Francisco. This leg featured guest appearances by singer Karri and members of Falls' Luxury Lane collective. A European leg of the tour begins on September 23 at La Place in Paris, with additional dates in Amsterdam, Berlin, and London.

== Composition ==
LVRS Paradise (Side A) incorporates elements of hip hop, Latin, Caribbean, and synthesized R&B, alongside minimal yet layered production reflecting Falls' Orlando background.

The opening track, "For Lvrs Only", establishes a slow-burning, seductive tone with its intimate, meditative feel. "Trick Daddy" follows, shifting to an upbeat, playful groove that reflects extravagant, confident love, echoing Miami bass and Florida's lively club scene.

The album also features collaborations with Ambré, Odeal, and Joyce Wrice. "Butterflies", featuring Wrice, is presented as a ballad centered on the theme of new love, while "Searching", with Odeal, reflects on longing through a soulful delivery. "Desires", featuring Ambré, addresses themes of vulnerability within romantic relationships. The album closes with "Heaven2me", a gospel-influenced ballad that frames love in a spiritual context. Across its nine tracks, Side A employs atmospheric, "after-hours" production, emphasizing Falls’ vocals and narrative style and creating a cohesive emotional arc.

== Singles ==
"Working with Odeal was effortless." "I always appreciate when I can tell that someone puts the time and effort into their craft."

— Falls on working with Odeal

"Searching" featuring Odeal was released as the lead single from LVRS PARADISE (Side A) in late March 2025. The track provides a cinematic, intimate exploration of longing, blending Isaiah Falls' emotionally raw vocals with Odeal's dynamic, Afro-infused counterpoint. Falls described the collaboration as seamless, expressing admiration for artists who bring skill and authenticity to the studio. The song received mostly positive reviews, with a critic noting that "SEARCHING" is sultry yet raw as the men encapsulate the "ache of longing" and that internal tug when the love you desire feels slightly out of your grasp.

"Butterflies" featuring Joyce Wrice, was released as the second single and quickly became one of the project's most notable tracks. Originally a viral hit from Drugs n' Lullabies, the song gained further prominence with an official video directed by Nasser Boulaich, filmed against a sun-washed backdrop that enhanced its dreamy, infatuated tone. It was also featured on Rolling Stone's "Songs of the Week" list.

== Critical reception ==
The Garnette Report described Side A as "a moody, immersive space" that balances the "euphoria of new love and the serenity of being fully seen," calling it "a portrait of love built on the courage to surrender." Wavez Movement shared a similar view, describing the album as emotionally complex and cinematic. It highlighted "Trick Daddy" for its seductive vocal tone, "Butterflies" for its dreamlike harmonic interplay with Joyce Wrice, and commended Falls' ability to make each moment feel like a visual memory.

According to The Berkeley Beacon, Falls' sound reflects the legacy of Southern R&B, blending influences from artists like OutKast, Ludacris, and Nelly with his Orlando-rooted style. The article noted his multi-layered vocal approach, Southern swagger, and commitment to creative independence, pointing out that his hands-on role in songwriting, production, and visual direction highlights the authenticity of his work. Orlando Weekly described the project as the most significant album release from the city in recent years.

== Track listing ==
Side A track listing
No.	Title	Writer(s)	Producer(s)	Length
1.	"For Lvrs Only"	Isaiah Falls; Gabriel Blizman; Philip Kavuma; Benson Bazlime; Matthew Cristobol; Dylan Fung; Daniel Davidson	LVRS N FRIENDS; Bazlime; Icee Red; Phil Mango; Luxury Lane; G.Bliz; Dylex	2:15
2.	"A Florida Luv Story"	Falls; Blizman; Kavuma; Bazlime; Cristobol; Natalia Hawthorne; Michael Hilton	LVRS N FRIENDS; Luxury Lane; Phil Mango; G.Bliz; SW8VY; Icee Red	2:39
3.	"Get Ya Money"	Falls; Blizman; Kavuma; Bazlime; Cristobol; Davidson; Tia Long; Bianca Quadrado; Olexsandr Ivantsov	LVRS N Friends; Luxury Lane; Phil Mango; G.Bliz; Icee Red; Sw8vy; LAGUNE	2:20
4.	"Take a Hit"	Falls; Blizman; Kavuma; Bazlime; Cristobol; Hilton	LVRS N Friends; Luxury Lane; Phil Mango; G.Bliz; Icee Red; Sw8vy; Channel WYA	2:35
5.	"Trick Daddy"	Falls; Blizman; Kavuma; Bazlime; Cristobol; Davidson; Christian Parris	LVRS N Friends; Luxury Lane; G.Bliz; Blasian Chris; Icee Red; Phil Mango; Sw8vy	1:53
6.	"Desires" (with Ambré)	Falls; Blizman; Kavuma; Bazlime; Cristobol; India Ambré Perkins; Hilton; Jun-seok Song	LVRS N Friends; Luxury Lane; Phil Mango; G.Bliz; Sw8vy; Jake Still; Icee Red	2:50
7.	"Searching" (with Odeal)	Falls; Blizman; Kavuma; Bazlime; Cristobol; Hilary Dennis Udanoh; Mike Hector; Matthew Suggett; William Dantzler II; Kenyatta Naji Johnson-Adams; Benjamin Schwler; Itai Shapira	LVRS N Friends; Luxury Lane; Phil Mango; G.Bliz; Sw8vy; Rami Sadawi; Icee Red; Malik Ninety Five; Odeal; Hector	2:30
8.	"Butterflies" (with Joyce Wrice)	Falls; Joyce Wrice; Blizman; Kavuma; Bazlime; Cristobol; Florian Ziga; Exavis Carpenter; Munya Mamina; Alaina Graham; Kaelin Ellis	LVRS N Friends; Luxury Lane; Phil Mango; G.Bliz; Icee Red; Ellis; Sw8vy; Flozigg; Marco Virgillo Paz Saffioti	2:43
9.	"Heaven2me"	Falls; Blizman; Kavuma; Bazlime; Cristobol; Davidson; Ellis; Victor Trung Tran; Natasha Velez; Hawthorne; Hilton	LVRS N Friends; Luxury Lane; Phil Mango; G.Bliz; Icee Red; Sw8vy; Channel WYA; TrulyAkira	2:14
Total length:				21:59

Side B track listing
No.	Title	Writer(s)	Producer(s)	Length
1.	"Florida Boi"	Isaiah Falls; Gabriel Blizman; Philip Kavuma; Benson Bazlime; Daniel Davidson; Matthew Cristobal; Pasdechance	LVRS N FRIENDS; Luxury Lane; Phil Mango; G.Bliz; SW8VY; Icee Red; Pasdechance	2:39
2.	"Taboo"	Falls; Blizman; Bazlime; Nusrat Fateh Ali Khan; Peter Gabriel	Falls; Luxury Lane; Phil Mango; G.Bliz; SW8VY; Icee Red; Nico Harris; Mirelle the Gemini	2:46
3.	"Play Ya Cards" (featuring 03 Greedo)	Falls; Jason Jackson; Tyler Nguyen; Blizman; Kavuma; Bazlime; Cristobol; Davidson	Falls; Luxury Lane; Phil Mango; G.Bliz; Icee Red; Sw8vy; Ty	2:37
4.	"Back in My Arms"	Falls; Blizman; Kavuma; Bazlime; Cristobol	Falls; Luxury Lane; Phil Mango; G.Bliz; Icee Red; Sw8vy	3:43
5.	"Flawless" (featuring Yakiyn and Loose Kannon Takeoff)	Falls; Blizman; Kavuma; Bazlime; Cristobol; Yakiyn Halliburton; Tevin Raymond Brown; Tyler Williams; Oliver Zoega	Falls; Luxury Lane; G.Bliz; Phil Mango; Icee Red; Sw8vy; T-Minus	3:05
6.	"Maria, My Love"	Falls; Blizman; Kavuma; Bazlime; Cristobol; Kai-Alexander Ashton Casey	Falls; Luxury Lane; Phil Mango; G.Bliz; Sw8vyl; Icee Red; Uncle Kizzy	2:51
7.	"Honeybutter" (featuring Mahalia)	Falls; Mahalia Burkmar; Blizman; Kavuma; Bazlime; Cristobol; Nick Gutfleish; John Wehmeyer; Zach Niess	Falls; Luxury Lane; Phil Mango; G.Bliz; Sw8vy; Icee Red; Gutty; Wehmeyer; Niess	3:46
8.	"Mayday"	Falls; Blizman; Kavuma; Bazlime; Cristobol	Falls; Luxury Lane; Phil Mango; G.Bliz; Icee Red; Sw8vy	2:48
9.	"Lavish" (featuring LateNightJiggy)	Falls; Blizman; Kavuma; Bazlime; Cristobol; Robert Goodwin; Kaelin Ellis; Natalia Hawthorne	Falls; Luxury Lane; Phil Mango; G.Bliz; Icee Red; Sw8vy; Ellis	3:46
10.	"Big Boi Speaks"	Falls; Blizman; Kavuma; Bazlime; Cristobol; Antwan André Patton	Falls; Luxury Lane; Phil Mango; G.Bliz; Icee Red; Sw8vy	0:50
11.	"Out the Game"	Falls; Blizman; Kavuma; Bazlime; Cristobol; Francis Esteban	Falls; Luxury Lane; Phil Mango; G.Bliz; Icee Red; Sw8vy; ESTA.	2:30
12.	"Anywhere With You"	Falls; Blizman; Kavuma; Bazlime; Cristobol; Davidson; Juwan Elcock	Falls; Luxury Lane; Phil Mango; G.Bliz; Icee Red; Sw8vy; BLK ODYSSY; Riley Shea Kennedy	2:08
Total length:				33:29
