= Audacity (Jae Stephens album) =

Studio album by Jae Stephens
- Released: September 25, 2026
- Genres: Pop; R&B
- Length: 33:24
- Labels: Def Jam; Raedio
- Producer: Dallas Caton

Jae Stephens chronology
| Total Sellout (2025) | Audacity (2026) |

Singles from Audacity
- 1. "Attaboy!" Released: May 29, 2026; 2. "Sugar Trap" Released: July 30, 2026; 3. "Gymnastics" / "I Miss the City" Released: September 1, 2026

Audacity (stylized in all caps) is the debut studio album by the American singer, songwriter and producer Jae Stephens. It was released on September 25, 2026, by Def Jam Recordings and Raedio. The album contains 11 tracks and follows Stephens' Sellout series of extended plays and her 2025 project Total Sellout.

== Background and themes ==
Audacity was conceived from a "desire to break free" from the limitations placed on Stephens, as well as a desire to go all out and "throw everything at the wall". In creating the album, Stephens envisioned it as taking place "sonically and thematically" in the world of the 2000 film Coyote Ugly, as well as "in the city", "at night", and "run by women". Inspired by the reception to her single "Afterbody", Stephens and producer Dallas Caton sought to build upon the song's sound and approach. Stephens described much of the album as an exploration of whether she was the "bad guy", while also serving as a statement of fully embracing that identity rather than "hiding behind" it.

In a statement, Stephens described the album as her "daring to take up as much space" as possible in a world that had attempted to box her in. She said the album showcases her "ambitious, aggressive" and "at times avoidant tendencies", rather than ignoring or running from them. Regarding the album's title, Stephens explained that it reflects having the "audacity" to tell things from her own perspective, regardless of whether it makes her the "villain" in her story. The album features contributions from British artist MNEK on "I Miss the City" and British singer PinkPantheress, who provides background vocals on "Crush".

== Promotion ==
Stephens announced the album on July 31, 2026, alongside the release of the single "Sugar Trap". The album was described as exploring the "full spectrum of female duality" within a fictional setting called "Auda City". Alongside the album announcement, Stephens was confirmed as the supporting act for Khalid's UK and European tour in fall 2026.

== Critical reception ==
Professional ratings
Review scores
| Source | Rating |
|---|---|
| The Guardian | 4/5 stars |
| Pitchfork | 7.6/10 |

Audacity was received positively by critics. Writing for The Guardian, Shaad D'Souza praised Stephens' "big voice", which he noted complemented the album's "maximalist R&B and hyperactive pop" sound, and drew comparisons between the record and recent works of PinkPantheress and Salute. D'Souza concluded that the album is "bonkers", which he said "makes good on its title", praising Stephens for realizing her potential on her debut by refusing "to squander it".

Allison Harris of Pitchfork gave the album a 7.6 out of 10, praising Stephens for speaking "boldly about relationships" while confidently embracing the notion that "she's the prize". Harris identified several singers as influences on the album, including Janet Jackson, Britney Spears, Ashanti, Willow, and Brandy. Similarly to D'Souza's assessment, Harris praised Stephens' "rich voice", highlighting her "belts and coos" and their complement to the album's production. Although Harris noted that the album takes "few risks", she described its production as nuanced and "highly considered", contributing to an overall sense of "confidence".

== Track listing ==
All tracks were written by Jae Stephens and Dallas Caton, and produced by Caton, with additional contributors noted.

Audacity track listing
| No. | Title | Writer(s) | Producer(s) | Length |
|---|---|---|---|---|
| 1. | "Crush" | Lita Caputo | | 3:04 |
| 2. | "No One Knows My Name" | Caputo | | 2:44 |
| 3. | "Attaboy!" | Caputo | | 2:44 |
| 4. | "Sugar Trap" | Caputo | | 3:10 |
| 5. | "I Miss the City" | Uzoechi Osisioma Emenike | | 3:01 |
| 6. | "The Distance" | Caputo | | 3:52 |
| 7. | "Soft Side" | | Willy Will^{[a]} | 2:55 |
| 8. | "Downhill" | Whitney Phillips | | 3:24 |
| 9. | "B4U" | Caputo | Lita^{[a]} | 2:57 |
| 10. | "Expensive & Difficult" | Caputo | | 2:49 |
| 11. | "Gymnastics" | Phillips | | 2:43 |
| Total length: | | | | 33:24 |

Notes

- ^{^[a]} signifies an additional producer

== Personnel ==
Credits are adapted from Tidal.

- Jae Stephens – lead vocals (all tracks), background vocals (tracks 1–5, 7, 9, 10)
- Dallas Caton – production, bass guitar, drums, keyboards, percussion, engineering (all tracks); guitar, programming (5)
- Nickie Jon Pabón – mixing
- Dale Becker – mastering
- Lilian "Lita" Caputo – background vocals (1, 4, 10), additional production (9)
- PinkPantheress – background vocals (1)
- Adam Burt – mastering assistance (2, 5, 6, 9)
- Katie Harvey – mastering assistance (2, 5, 6, 9)
- Uzoechi Emenike – background vocals (5)
- Willy Will – additional production (7)
