= A Rush to Nowhere =

Studio album by Arima Ederra
- Released: March 6, 2026
- Recorded: 2024
- Genre: R&B
- Length: 47:42
- Label: RCA
- Producer: Arima Ederra; Caleb Laven; Marshall Mulherin; Parker Mulherin; Rahm; Solomonophonic; Teo Halm

Arima Ederra chronology
An Orange Colored Day (2022)	A Rush to Nowhere (2026)

Singles from A Rush to Nowhere
- 1. "You're My" Released: January 21, 2026; 2. "Gemini Eyes" Released: March 3, 2026

A Rush to Nowhere is the second studio album by the American musician Arima Ederra. It was released on March 6, 2026, through RCA Records, as the follow up to her debut studio album An Orange Colored Day (2022). A Rush to Nowhere revisits the folk and R&B style of An Orange Colored Day. The project was promoted through only one single—"Gemini Eyes"—as well as multiple accompanying live performances.

== Background and release ==
In January 2026, Arima Ederra had announced A Rush to Nowhere, as the follow-up to her debut studio album, An Orange Colored Day (2022).

== Composition ==
A Rush to Nowhere is an R&B album with elements of alternative, pop, folk, synth-pop, experimental pop, and soul. The album was written over a two-year period across locations including Lake Arrowhead, California, Havana, Cuba, and Oaxaca, Mexico.

== Critical reception ==
Professional ratings
Review scores
Source	Rating
Pitchfork	8/10

Upon release, A Rush to Nowhere received generally positive reviews from critics. Stephen Kearse of Pitchfork had commented on the album's approach at a fusion of folk and R&B music. The reviewer compared the album to American singer Mereba’s The Breeze Grew a Fire and Cleo Reed’s Cuntry. Angel Cook at Earmilk wrote that Ederra's vocals were "delicate", "sweet", "airy", and "soulful".

== Personnel ==
Credits adapted from Tidal.

- Arima Ederra – songwriting, production, composition, engineering (1)
