= Cold Shoulder (Drake song) =

2026 song by Drake featuring Don Toliver and Yebba

Single by Drake featuring Don Toliver and Yebba

from the album Habibti
- Released: October 15, 2026
- Length: 3:54
- Label: OVO; Republic
- Songwriters: Aubrey Graham; Caleb Toliver; Abigail Smith; Octavian Godji; Bradley Baker; James Cyr; Naza Major; Oliver Stern
- Producers: O Lil Angel; B4U; London Cyr; 20; Ohh!

Drake singles chronology
"No Brakes" (2026)	"Cold Shoulder" (2026)	"Hate Sleeping Alone" (2026)

Don Toliver singles chronology
"Every Night" (2026)	"Cold Shoulder" (2026)

Yebba singles chronology
"Yellow Eyes" (2026)	"Cold Shoulder" (2026)

Music video
- "Cold Shoulder" on YouTube

"Cold Shoulder" is a song by Canadian rapper Drake featuring American rapper Don Toliver and American singer Yebba. It was sent to Italian radio on October 15, 2026, as the lead single from Habibti (FOMO), a reissue of Drake's eleventh studio album Habibti (2026). Alongside the other songs from the Habibti reissue, the song was previously previewed in his YouTube short film FOMO on September 15, 2026. Lyrically, the song is about wishing to reconcile with romantic partners who have rejected them, with both rappers pleading for their respective women to come back.

== Music video ==
The music video was released along with the song. It sees Drake wandering around a theme park after being stood up by his date.

== Charts ==
Chart performance for "Cold Shoulder"
Chart (2026)	Peak position
Australia (ARIA)	82
Australia Hip Hop/R&B (ARIA)	11
Canada Hot 100 (Billboard)	7
Global 200 (Billboard)	28
Ireland (IRMA)	69
New Zealand Hot Singles (RMNZ)	3
South Africa Streaming (TOSAC)	22
UK Singles (Official Charts)	36
US Billboard Hot 100	18
US Hot R&B/Hip-Hop Songs (Billboard)	4
US Rhythmic Airplay (Billboard)	2
