= Joony =

American rapper

- Born: Jonathan Negero; Silver Spring, Maryland, U.S.
- Genres: Hip hop; R&B; trap
- Occupations: Rapper; singer; songwriter
- Instruments: Vocals
- Years active: 2009–present
- Labels: Interscope; Red Bull; Good Partners
- Website: joony211.com

Jonathan Negero better known by his stage name Joony, is an American rapper, singer, and songwriter. Born and raised in Silver Spring, Maryland, he gained initial recognition following the release of the commercial mixtape Joony the Mixtape in 2019. He rose to mainstream fame after being featured on Brent Faiyaz single "FYTB". The song debuted at number 97 on the Billboard Hot 100 chart, marking Joony's first appearance on the chart.

== Early life ==
Jonathan Negero was born in Silver Spring, Maryland. Growing up, Negero aspired to become a rapper, and later he developed an interest in indie and rock music. He developed an interest in music at a young age, influenced by his parents' musical tastes, which included Ethiopian music and mainstream radio stations. Negero started taking his rap career seriously at the age of 12. He drew inspiration from Atlanta rapper Future while in middle school and later from Mac Miller. He has cited blog rap and DMV rap as influences on his music.

== Career ==
=== 2009–2021: Career beginnings, Joony the Mixtape, Joony the Mixtape 2, Joony Vs the World, Ghost, Silent Battles, and Proud of U ===
Joony began writing music in seventh grade. He recorded his first song during the summer between eighth and ninth grade. Initially, Joony would rap over Kendrick Lamar and J. Cole instrumentals. His debut single, "Simple Fly," was released in April 2009, but it didn't garner much attention. Undeterred, Joony continued to strive for success, releasing "Dangerous" on 23 January 2019. Following this release, Joony dropped his debut commercial mixtape, Joony the Mixtape on 31 May 2019. Although the mixtape achieved moderate commercial success, it marked a significant milestone in Joony's career.

On 13 February 2020, he released his second mixtape, Joony the Mixtape 2. Joony's debut studio album, Joony Vs the World, was released on 23 April 2020. His second studio album, Ghost followed on 2 August 2020, and he later released "Lifestyle" in October of that year. In January 2021, Joony met Brent Faiyaz through a mutual friend, Xu, who is also Brent's long-time friend and photographer. Following this meeting, Brent signed Joony to his PULSE Music Group label, and they collaborated on the song "Paper Soldier," released on 9 February 2021. HipHopDX awarded the song a perfect 5/5 rating.

Joony released his third album, Silent Battles, with the single "Lifestyle" serving as the album's lead single. Taste Makers described the album as an exploration of troubled relationships with money and drugs, likening them to romantic relationships. In June 2021, Joony released "Changes." During an interview with Eaton Radio in Washington, D.C., Joony announced the upcoming release of his SILENT BATTLES DELUXE project. On 18 July 2021, the deluxe edition of Silent Battles was released, featuring a guest appearance from TyFontaine. In October 2021, Joony released "WYA?". On 25 November 2021, he released his debut extended play, Proud of U.

=== 2022: Breakthrough with Pretty in Black and "FYTB" ===
In March 2022, Joony released the single "Anytime", which was produced by Michael Allsopp. The music video for "Anytime" was directed by Lonewolf and features Joony in a fever dream-like state. On 6 May 2022, Joony released the single "DRIFTING IN TOKYO". The official music video was released on 13 May 2022.

On 27 May 2022, Joony released his fourth studio album, Pretty in Back. The album was produced by CashMoneyAP, Charlie Heat, Young Flavor, Ben10k, and Danes Blood. The album spawned the single "Not Going Back". Pitchfork praised the song as an early highlight, noting that Joony "loads up a slowly building beat with vocal effects, clashing background ad-libs, and swooning coos." The publication drew comparisons to Travis Scott, remarking that Joony's ability to blend genres seamlessly is a notable strength: "He won't ever need to define himself with one genre, if he can make them all sound this good."

In June 2022, Joony appeared as a featured artist on Sainté's single "East". On 8 July 2022, he was featured on Brent Faiyaz's single "FYTB". The song debuted at number 97 on the Billboard Hot 100 chart, marking Joony's first appearance on the chart.

In August 2022, Joony released the single "DORK". On 12 August 2022, he released the deluxe edition of Pretty in Back. He was featured on Jordan Ward's single "IDC" on 5 October 2022. In November 2022, Joony announced his debut Pretty in Black U.S. Tour. On 8 November 2022, he released the single "Pretty In Back".

=== 2023–present: Shitmuss, Memento, and Jrny ===
On 20 January 2023, Joony released "One Track Minded". The single featured Kelz2busy. In March, he released "Bad Time" featuring High Way. On 5 May 2023, Joony released the album Shitmuss with guest appearances from TTM Dawg and Big Weigh. On 2 June 2023, he released the deluxe edition of Shitmuss. On 20 October 2023, Joony released the project Memento. The project was released through Red Bull Records. In February 2024, Joony was featured on DaeMoney's "DOUBLE C'S". On 22 March 2024, Joony released the Mememto deluxe edition. In June 2024, he was also featured on Kendra Jae's "For The Thrill". On 4 October 2024, Joony and Jordan Ward released a collaborative extended play JRNY. On 4 April 2025, Joony released "Dopa(MINE)".

== Discography ==
=== Studio albums ===
Title	Details
Joony vs the World	Release date: 23 April 2020; Format: Digital download
Ghosts	Release date: 2 August 2020; Format: Digital download
Silent Battles	Release date: 11 February 2021; Label: 211; Format: Digital download
Pretty in Black	Release date: 27 May 2022; Label: 211, Good Partners; Format: Digital download
Shitumss	Release date: 5 May 2023; Label: 211; Format: Digital download
Momento	Release date: 20 October 2023; Label: 211, Red Bull Records, Evgle; Format: Digital download

=== Mixtapes ===
Title	Details
Joony the Mixtape	Release date: 31 May 2019; Format: Digital download
Joony the Mixtape 2	Release date: 13 February 2020; Format: Digital download

=== Extended Plays ===
Title	Details
Proud of U	Release date: 27 May 2022; Label: 211, Good Partners; Format: Digital download
