= Ryan Trey =

American singer and rapper

- Born: Ryan Trey; 27 March 1999 (age 27); St. Louis, Missouri
- Origin: American
- Genres: Hip hop, R&B
- Occupations: Singer; songwriter
- Instrument: Vocals
- Years active: 2017–present
- Label: Interscope
- Website: ryantrey.com

Ryan Trey (born 27 March 1999), is an American R&B rapper, singer, and songwriter. He gained mainstream recognition following the commercial release of his single "Mutual Butterflies" in 2018.

== Early life ==
Trey was born on March 27, 1999, in St. Louis, Missouri and raised in a musical environment. He started writing and recording songs during his teenage years.

== Career ==
Trey began sharing songs online in high school and released his debut mixtape, EIGHT24, in 2017. The eight-song project included the single "Real", which was Trey's first track to reach a national audience. Trey first gained attention with the release of his breakout single, "Mutual Butterflies", in 2018. The track showcases his smooth vocal delivery and quickly garnered millions of streams on various platforms. In 2018, Trey released his debut album August, an album that established his presence in the music scene. The project received positive reviews for its cohesive sound and mature themes, exploring love, ambition, and personal growth.

His single "Nowhere to Run", featuring Bryson Tiller, was released in March 2019, accompanied by a music video.

=== A 64 East Saga ===
Trey collaborated with Bryson Tiller on a project in 2021 to release A 64 East Saga, It was released through Digital streaming platform.

=== Streets Say You Miss Me ===
In November 2023, he released his second studio album Streets Say You Miss Me, featuring guest appearances by Mariah the Scientist, Chase Shakur, NoCap, and Vory. His lead single "AIN'T EVEN FRIENDS" featuring Mariah the Scientist was released in June 2023.

== Musical style and influences ==
Trey's music is characterized by its blend of melodic Rap and R&B, often featuring soulful beats and introspective lyrics. He cites a wide range of influences, including artists like Drake, J. Cole, and Frank Ocean, whose music has shaped his artistic approach and lyrical style. Many critics have praised his style of music.

== Discography ==
=== Mixtapes ===
- EIGHT24 (2017)

=== Album ===
- August (2018)
- A 64 East Saga
- Streets Say You Miss Me (2023)
- Streets Say You Still Miss Me - Deluxe Edition (2023)
