= Quebec (song) =

2026 song by Drake

Song by Drake

from the album Habibti
- Released: October 2, 2026
- Genre: R&B
- Length: 2:10
- Label: OVO; Republic
- Songwriters: Aubrey Graham; Noel Cadastre; Tyshane Thompson; Samuel Jiménez; Edgar Ferrera; Michael Hernandez; Sebastian Lopez; Arham Paul; Hugo Mari; Darin Smith; Ricky McNeal
- Producers: Beam; Cadastre; Smash David; SkipOnDaBeat; Foreign Teck; 5ebas; APMelodies; Mari

Music video
- "Quebec" on YouTube

"Quebec" is a song by Canadian rapper Drake from Habibti (FOMO), a reissue of his eleventh studio album Habibti (2026). Alongside the other tracks from the reissue, it was previously previewed in his YouTube short film FOMO on September 15, 2026.

== Critical reception ==
Gabriel Bras Nevares of HotNewHipHop described the song as "icy and flowy", highlighting its atmospheric sound and "some solid vocal performances and melodic riffing".

== Music video ==
The music video was released on the same day as the song. Filmed on camcorder, it features Drake's collection of luxury jewelry and other prized possessions, including Chrome Hearts pieces, Richard Mille watches, tricked out Western boots, and cars (among them rapper Cam'ron's pink 2003 Range Rover). The video shows his lavish Toronto home, where balloons celebrating his album Iceman's double-platinum status are displayed. Drake also sings in front of a projection of the Jacques Cartier Bridge and the Montreal skyline, and poses by a tanning bed.

== Charts ==
Chart performance for "Quebec"
Chart (2026)	Peak position
Australia (ARIA)	90
Australia Hip Hop/R&B (ARIA)	12
Canada Hot 100 (Billboard)	5
Global 200 (Billboard)	20
Ireland (IRMA)	67
New Zealand Hot Singles (RMNZ)	4
South Africa Streaming (TOSAC)	15
UK Singles (Official Charts)	27
US Billboard Hot 100	11
US Hot R&B/Hip-Hop Songs (Billboard)	2
