= Joyce Wrice =

American musician

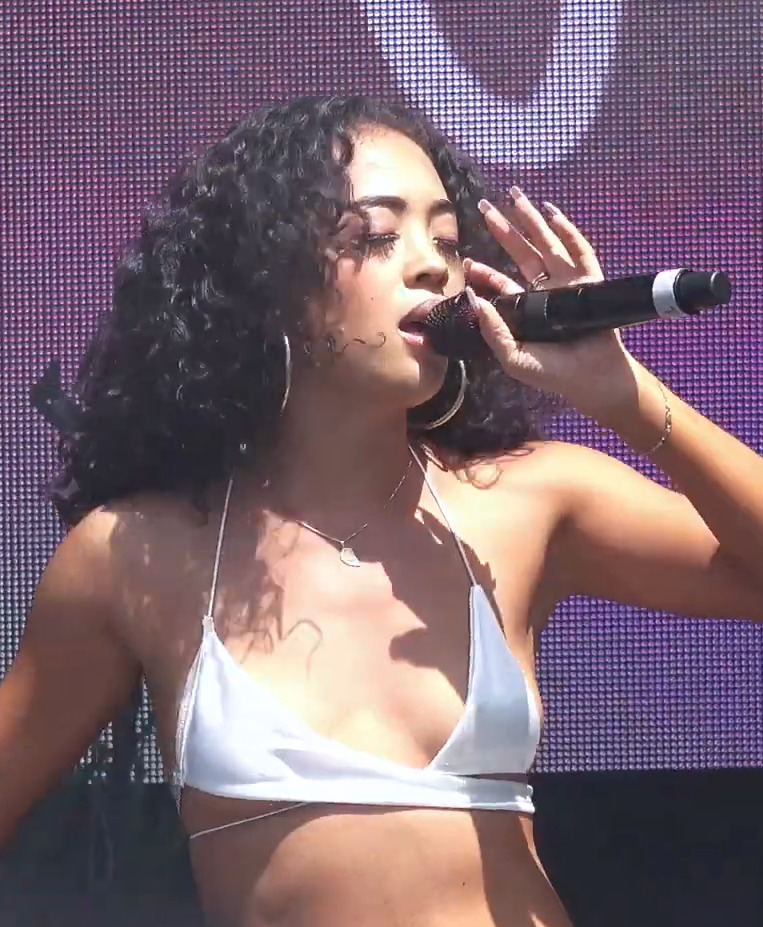
- Wrice in 2022

Background information
- Born: Joyce Machiko Wrice; August 14, 1992 (age 34); Chula Vista, California, United States
- Origin: San Diego, California, United States
- Genres: R&B; neo soul
- Occupation: Singer-songwriter
- Instruments: Vocals; piano; keyboard
- Years active: 2015–present
- Label: Joyce Wrice Music
- Website: joycewrice.com

YouTube information
- Channel: Joyce Wrice
- Subscribers: 74.5 thousand
- Views: 18.6 million
- Last updated: 01 September 2026

Joyce Machiko Wrice (/dʒɔɪs məˈtʃiːkoʊ raɪs/,muh-CHEE-koh-RYCE born August 14, 1992) is an American singer and songwriter from San Diego, California. Known for her blend of R&B and neo soul, she gained recognition with her debut album, Overgrown (2021). In 2023, Wrice earned a nomination alongside music producer Kaytranada at the Juno Awards.

== Early life ==
Wrice was born and raised in Chula Vista, California, to a Japanese mother and an African-American father. Wrice developed an interest in music at an early age, listening to a wide range of artists including Mariah Carey, Brandy, and Lauryn Hill. After graduating from Otay Ranch High School, she moved to Orange County to study at Soka University of America. She initially planned to become a special needs educator, but moved to Los Angeles in 2013 to pursue a career in music. While working on original songs, she was a hostess for a Japanese restaurant until 2020 when she became a full-time musician.

== Career ==
Wrice began her music career by posting covers and original songs on platforms like YouTube and SoundCloud, where she gradually built a following. In 2016, she released her debut EP, Stay Around, which featured a collection of R&B tracks and established her as a rising artist in the independent music scene.

Her breakthrough came with the release of her debut album, Overgrown, in March 2021. The album featured collaborations with artists like Masego, Freddie Gibbs, and Lucky Daye. Overgrown was praised for its cohesive production, reminiscent of classic R&B, and Wrice's rich, emotive vocals. The album's lead single, "On One", became particularly popular, earning significant streaming numbers and radio play. In 2022, she was listed as one of Okayplayer's "10 Artists to Watch". She also performed the theme song for the 2022 Disney+ series The Proud Family: Louder and Prouder.

In July 2024, Wrice was featured on Blxst's "Better Off Friends", a song off of his debut album, I'll Always Come Find You. She joined him later that year on as a special guest on his tour, the I’ll Always Come Find You Tour.

== Discography ==
=== Albums ===
List of studio album, with selected details
Title	Album details
Overgrown	Released: March 19, 2021; Label: Joyce Wrice Music; Format: Cassette, CD, Digital download, LP, streaming
MACHIKO	Release: October 9, 2026; Label: Joyce Wrice Music, BMG; Format: TBD

=== Extended plays ===
List of extended plays, with selected details
Title	EP details
Stay Around	Released: May 24, 2016; Format: Digital download
Good Morning	Released: May 16, 2017; Format: Digital download
Motive	Released: October 7, 2022; Format: Digital download

=== Notable singles ===
- "On One" featuring Freddie Gibbs (2021)
- "That's On You" (2020)
- "Falling in Love" (2019)

=== Film score ===
- The Proud Family: Louder and Prouder (2022)

== Awards and nominations ==
Year	Event	Category	Work	Result	Ref
2020	Pop Awards 2024	Music Video of the Year Award	"Bittersweet Goodbyes”	Nominated	
2023	Juno Awards of 2023	Producer of the Year	"Iced Tea" – Joyce Wrice and KAYTRANADA	Nominated	
