= 2023 in rhythm and blues =

This article summarizes the events, album releases, and album release dates in rhythm and blues for the year 2023.

== Events ==
=== January ===
- On January 1, Fred White died at the age of 67.
- On January 13, Thomasina Winslow died at the age of 57.
- On January 17, Renée Geyer died at the age of 69.
- On January 28, Barrett Strong died at the age of 81.
- On January 31, Charlie Thomas died at the age of 85.

=== February ===
- On February 5, the 65th Annual Grammy Awards were held. Beyoncé won both Best R&B Song for "Cuff It" and Best R&B Traditional Performance for "Plastic Off the Sofa". Muni Long won Best R&B Performance for "Hrs and Hrs". Steve Lacy won Best Progressive R&B Album for Gemini Rights. Robert Glasper won Best R&B Album for Black Radio III.
- On February 11, the Brit Awards 2023 were held. Flo won the Rising Star award.
- On February 13, Huey "Piano" Smith died at the age of 89. On the same day, Spencer Wiggins died at the age of 81.
- On February 16, Chuck Jackson died at the age of 85.
- On February 18, Don Shinn died at the age of 77. On the same day, the 12th Circle Chart Music Awards were held. NCT won Artist of the Year – Physical Album 1st Quarter for Universe. Stray Kids won Artist of the Year – Physical Album 4th Quarter for Maxident. NewJeans won New Artist of the Year Digital Music for "Attention". (G)I-dle won Record Production of the Year for I Never Die. On the same day, the 49th People's Choice Awards were held. Beyoncé won R&B Artist of the Year.
- On February 23, R. Kelly was sentenced in Chicago federal court to 20 years in prison for child pornography and other sexual crimes involving minors, with 19 years being concurrent to his previous 30-year term handed down in New York. Kelly will now serve 31 years in prison.
- On February 25, the 54th NAACP Image Awards were held. Beyoncé won Outstanding Female Artist, Outstanding Soul/R&B Song for "Cuff It", and Outstanding Album for Renaissance. Coco Jones won Outstanding New Artist. Chris Brown won Outstanding Male Artist. Chris Brown and Wizkid won Outstanding Duo, Group or Collaboration (Contemporary) for "Call Me Every Day". Silk Sonic won Outstanding Duo, Group or Collaboration (Traditional) for "Love's Train". Rihanna won Outstanding Music Video/Visual Album for "Lift Me Up". Ryan Coogler, Ludwig Göransson, Archie Davis & Dave Jordan won Outstanding Soundtrack/Compilation Album for Black Panther: Wakanda Forever (Soundtrack). Tems won Outstanding International Song for "No Woman No Cry".

=== March ===
- On March 1, Leon Hughes died at the age of 92.
- On March 5, the 20th Korean Music Awards were held. Younha won Song of the Year for "Event Horizon". NewJeans won Rookie of the Year, Best K-Pop Song for "Attention", and Best K-Pop Album for New Jeans. A.Train won Best R&B & Soul Album for Private Pink. Bibi won Best R&B & Soul Song for "Jotto". Nucksal and Cadejo won Best Rap & Hip-Hop Album for Sincerely Yours and Best Rap & Hip-Hop Song for "Good Morning Seoul".
- On March 13, the Juno Awards of 2023 were held. The Weeknd won Artist of the Year, Songwriter of the Year, Single of the Year for "Sacrifice", and Album of the Year for Dawn FM. Akeel Henry won Producer of the Year. Angelique Francis won Blues Album of the Year for Long River. Jessie Reyez won Contemporary R&B/Soul Recording of the Year for Yessie. Savannah Ré and Dylan Sinclair won Traditional R&B/Soul Recording of the Year for "Last One". Kaytranada and Anderson .Paak won Rap Single of the Year for "Twin Flame".
- On March 14, Bobby Caldwell died at the age of 71.
- On March 16, Fuzzy Haskins died at the age of 81.
- On March 27, Peggy Scott-Adams died at the age of 74. On the same day, the 2023 iHeartRadio Music Awards were held. Future, Drake, and Tems won Hip-Hop Song of the Year for "Wait for U". Drake won Hip-Hop Artist of the Year. SZA won R&B Artist of the Year and R&B Song of the Year for "I Hate U". Muni Long won Best New R&B Artist. Kali Uchis won Best New Latin Artist. Beyoncé won R&B Album of the Year for Renaissance.
- On March 29, Sweet Charles Sherrell died at the age of 80.
- On March 31, the 2023 Global Awards were held. Raye and 070 Shake won Best Social Trended Song for "Escapism". Flo won the Rising Star Award. Lizzo won Best Female.

=== April ===
- On April 5, Booker Newberry III died at the age of 67.
- On April 25, Billy "The Kid" Emerson died at the age of 97.
- On April 27, the APRA Music Awards of 2023 were held. Xavier Rudd won Most Performed Blues & Roots Work for "We Deserve to Dream". Miiesha won Most Performed R&B / Soul Work for "Still Dream".

=== May ===
- On May 3, Linda Lewis died at the age of 72.
- On May 5, Chris Strachwitz died at the age of 91.
- On May 6, the 17th Metro FM Music Awards were held. MOE. won Best New Age R&B Artist.
- On May 23, Sheldon Reynolds died at the age of 63.
- On May 24, Tina Turner died at the age of 83.
- On May 30, DaniLeigh was arrested for a DUI in Miami-Dade County, Florida.

=== June ===
- On June 4, George Winston at the age of 74.
- On June 15, the 2023 Libera Awards were held. Shemekia Copeland won Best Blues Record for Done Come Too Far. Sudan Archives won Breakthrough Artist/Release and Best R&B Record for Natural Brown Prom Queen. Lee Fields won Best Soul/Funk Record for Sentimental Fool.
- On June 23, Jacquees was arrested for battery in Gwinnett County, Georgia.
- On June 25, the BET Awards 2023 were held. SZA won Best Female R&B/Pop Artist, Album of the Year for SOS and Video of the Year for "Kill Bill". Beyoncé won the BET Her Award for "Break My Soul", Album of the Year for Renaissance and the Viewer's Choice Award for "Break My Soul". Future, Drake, and Tems won Best Collaboration for "Wait for U". Usher won Best Male R&B/Pop Artist. Coco Jones won Best New Artist.Chris Brown won Best Male R&B/Pop Artist.
- On June 30, Lord Creator died at the age of 87.

=== July ===
- On July 1, the 34th Golden Melody Awards were held. A-Lin won Best Female Mandarin Singer.
- On July 3, Vicki Anderson died at the age of 83.
- On July 5, Coco Lee died at the age of 48.
- On July 12, August Moon died at the age of 85.

=== August ===
- On August 2, Lizzo was sued for allegedly creating a hostile work environment by sexually harassing and weight shaming her dancers.
- On August 13, Clarence Avant died at the age of 92.
- On August 7, Toussaint McCall died at the age of 89.
- On August 17, Bobby Eli died at the age of 77.
- On August 29, August 08 died at the age of 31.

=== September ===
- On September 12, the 2023 MTV Video Music Awards were held. SZA won Best R&B for "Shirt".
- On September 16, Irish Grinstead, of 702, died at the age of 43.
- On September 26, the 2023 AIM Independent Music Awards were held. Raye and 070 Shake won Best Independent Track for "Escapism".
- On September 27, the 2023 Australian Women in Music Awards were held. Vika and Linda won the Artistic Excellence Award.
- On September 30, Russell Batiste Jr. died at the age of 57.

=== October ===
- On October 5, the 2023 Billboard Latin Music Awards were held. Romeo Santos won Tropical Artist of the Year, Solo. Aventura won Tropical Artist of the Year, Duo or Group.
- On October 11, Rudolph Isley, of The Isley Brothers, died at the age of 84.
- On October 26, the 2023 UK Music Video Awards were held. Jorja Smith won Best R&B/Soul Video – UK for "Try Me". Lil Yachty won Best R&B/Soul Video – International for "Say Something". Sans Soucis won Best R&B/Soul Video – Newcomer for "I Know Your Present". Bakar won Best Alternative Video – UK for "Alive!" Audrey Nuna won Best Visual Effects in a Video for "Locket".

=== November ===
- On November 3, Missy Elliott, George Michael, Chaka Khan, Al Kooper, The Spinners, and Don Cornelius were inducted into the Rock and Roll Hall of Fame.
- On November 5, the 2023 MTV Europe Music Awards were held. Chris Brown won Best R&B.
- On November 10, Johnny Ruffo died at the age of 35.
- On November 15, the 2023 ARIA Music Awards were held. Genesis Owusu won Album of the Year, Best Hip Hop/Rap Release, and Best Independent Release for Struggler. The Teskey Brothers won Best Blues & Roots Album for The Winding Way. Forest Claudette won Best Cover Art for Everything Was Green and Best Soul/R&B Release for "Mess Around" with EarthGang.
- On November 19, the 2023 Billboard Music Awards were held. SZA won Top R&B Artist, Top R&B Female Artist, Top R&B Song for "Kill Bill", and Top R&B Album for SOS. The Weeknd won Top R&B Male Artist. Beyoncé won Top R&B Touring Artist, Top Dance/Electronic Artist, and Top Dance/Electronic Album for Renaissance. Drake won Top Rap Artist, Top Rap Male Artist, and Top Rap Touring Artist. NewJeans won Top Global K-Pop Artist. Metro Boomin, The Weeknd, and 21 Savage won Top Collaboration for "Creepin'".
- On November 22, Jean Knight died at the age of 80.
- On November 26, the 2023 Soul Train Music Awards were held. SZA won Best R&B/Soul Female Artist, Album of the Year for SOS, Song of the Year and The Ashford & Simpson Songwriter's Award for "Snooze". Victoria Monét won Video of the Year and Best Dance Performance for "On My Mama". Usher won Best R&B/Soul Male Artist, Soul Train Certified Award, and Best Collaboration, alongside Summer Walker & 21 Savage, for "Good Good".
- On November 28, the 2023 MAMA Awards were held. NewJeans won Artist of the Year, Song of the Year and Best Dance Performance – Female Group for "Ditto", and Best Female Group. Seventeen won Best Male Group and Best Dance Performance – Male Group for "Super". Jimin won Best Male Artist.

=== December ===
- On December 2, the 2023 Melon Music Awards were held. NewJeans won Artist of the Year, Best Female Group, and Song of the Year for "Ditto". NCT Dream won Best Male Group. Aespa won Best Female Performance and Global Artist. Seventeen won Best Male Performance. Kiss of Life won 1theK Global Icon. NCT Dream won Record of the Year.
- On December 26, Zahara died at the age of 35.
- On December 29, Les McCann died at the age of 88.

== Released albums ==
=== January ===
Day	Artist(s)	Album	Record label(s)	Entering chart position
9	Monsta X	Reason	Starship, Kakao	Debuted at No. 1 on the Circle Album Chart
13	Joesef	Permanent Damage	AWAL, Bold Cut	
13	Vedo	Mood Swings	New Wav Music, Island Prolific, Empire	
16	Got the Beat	Stamp on It	SM, Dreamus	Debuted at No. 3 on the Circle Album Chart
18	Koda Kumi	Wings	Rhythm Zone	Debuted at No. 10 on the Oricon Albums Chart
20	Låpsley	Cautionary Tales of Youth	Believe, Young	
25	Yesung	Sensory Flows	SM Entertainment, Label SJ	Debuted at No. 4 on the Circle Album Chart
27	Aya Nakamura	DNK	Rec. 118, Warner Music France	Debuted at No. 1 on the SNEP Charts
27	Jackie Venson	Evolution of Joy	Self-released	
27	Kimbra	A Reckoning	Self-released	
27	Lil Yachty	Let's Start Here	Motown, Quality Control	Debuted at No. 9 on the Billboard 200
27	Popcaan	Great Is He	OVO Sound	
27	The Arcs	Electrophonic Chronic	Easy Eye Sound	Debuted at No. 90 on the Offizielle Top 100
31	Phum Viphurit	The Greng Jai Piece	Rats Records, Lirico	

=== February ===
Day	Artist(s)	Album	Record label(s)	Entering chart position
2	Raye	My 21st Century Blues	Human Re Sources	Debuted at No. 2 on the UK Albums Chart; Debuted at No. 58 on the Billboard 200
10	Elodie	OK. Respira	Island Records	Debuted at No. 4 on the FIMI Chart
10	Eric Bellinger	1-800-Hit Eazy: Line 2	All Wins Entertainment, Empire	
10	Kelela	Raven	Warp Records	Debuted at No. 18 on the UK Independent Albums Chart
10	Lance Skiiiwalker	Audiodidactic	Top Dawg Entertainment	
10	Liv.e	Girl in the Half Pearl	In Real Life Music, AWAL Recordings America	
10	Sabrina Claudio	Archives & Lullabies	SC Entertainment	
16	Rakiyah	The Cosmic Queen	Self-released	
16	Tini	Cupido	Hollywood, 5020, Sony Latin	
17	Wesley Joseph	Glow	Secretly Canadian	
24	Don Toliver	Love Sick	Cactus Jack Records, Atlantic Records	Debuted at No. 8 on the Billboard 200
24	Jozzy	Songs For Women, Free Game For N****s	Love Records	
24	Tink	Thanks 4 Nothing	Winter's Diary, WD Records, Empire	Debuted at No. 147 on the Billboard 200
24	U.S. Girls	Bless This Mess	4AD	
27	Sam Smith	Gloria	Capitol	Debuted at No. 1 on the UK Albums Chart; Debuted at No. 7 on the Billboard 200
28	Kamauu	Welcome to Kamauu.world	Warner Music Group, X5 Music Group	

=== March ===
Day	Artist(s)	Album	Record label(s)	Entering chart position
3	Chiiild	Better Luck In the Next Life	Avant Garden, 4th & Broadway, Def Jam Recordings	
3	Dreamville	Creed III: The Soundtrack	Dreamville, Interscope	Debuted at No. 127 on the Billboard 200
3	Kali Uchis	Red Moon in Venus	Geffen Records	Debuted at No. 4 on the Billboard 200
3	Masego	Masego	EQT Recordings, Capitol Records, UMG Recordings	
3	Yazmin Lacey	Voice Notes	Own Your Own Records, Believe	
6	Onew	Circle	SM	Debuted at No. 3 on the Circle Album Chart
10	August Alsina	Myself	Shake the World, Empire	
10	Musiq Soulchild & Hit-Boy	Victims and Villains	SoulStar Music Company	
10	The War and Treaty	Lover's Game	UMG Nashville	
13	Kai	Rover	SM, Dreamus	Debuted at No. 1 on the Circle Album Chart
16	Code Kunst	Remember Archive	AOMG	Debuted at No. 19 on the Circle Album Chart
17	ELHAE	Forgotten Flowers	Dream Loud Music Group	
17	Malina Moye	Dirty	WCE Records, The Orchard	
17	T-Pain	On Top of the Covers	Nappy Boy, Empire	
17	Tei Shi	Bad Premonition	The Orchard	
17	Unknown Mortal Orchestra	V	Jagjaguwar	
24	6lack	Since I Have a Lover	LVRN, Interscope Records	Debuted at No. 24 on the Billboard 200
24	Billy Valentine	Billy Valentine & The Universal Truth	Bob Thiele Jr., Acid Jazz Acquisitions	
24	Jimin	Face	Big Hit	Debuted at No. 1 on the Circle Album Chart; Debuted at No. 2 on the Billboard 200
24	Matt Corby	Everything's Fine	Island Australia	
24	Yaya Bey	Exodus the North Star	Big Dada	
25	Kristian Bush	52 | ATL x BNA	Big Machine	
28	Billlie	The Billage of Perception: Chapter Three	Mystic Story, Kakao	Debuted at No. 5 on the Circle Album Chart
31	B. Cool-Aid	Leather Blvd	Lex	
31	Chlöe	In Pieces	Parkwood Entertainment, Columbia Records	Debuted at No. 119 on the Billboard 200
31	Davido	Timeless	DMW, Columbia, Sony	Debuted at No. 37 on the Billboard 200
31	Eddie Chacon	Sundown	Stones Throw Records	Debuted at No. 19 on the UK Independent Albums Chart

=== April ===
Day	Artist(s)	Album	Record label(s)	Entering chart position
7	Brandee Younger	Brand New Life	Impulse!, Verve Label Group, UMG Recordings	
7	Daniel Caesar	Never Enough	Hollace, Republic Records	Debuted at No. 14 on the Billboard 200
7	Planet Giza	Ready When You Are	Quiet Note	
7	They.	Nü Moon	Nü Religion Records, AWAL	
14	Dinner Party	Enigmatic Society	Sound of Crenshaw, Empire	Debuted at No. 17 on the Billboard US Top Jazz Albums
14	Jean Deaux	Heavy	Duality Records, Empire	
14	Petite Noir	MotherFather	Roya Records	
14	Yung Bleu	Love Scars II	Moon Boy University, Empire	Debuted at No. 38 on the Billboard 200
17	NCT DoJaeJung	Perfume	SM	Debuted at No. 2 on the Circle Album Chart
21	Alfa Mist	Variables	Anti-	
21	Dreamer Isioma	Princess Forever	AWAL	
21	Everything but the Girl	Fuse	Buzzin' Fly, Virgin	Debuted at No. 3 on the UK Albums Chart; Debuted at No. 116 on the Billboard 200
21	Nourished by Time	Erotic Probiotic 2	Scenic Route	
21	Post Malone	The Diamond Collection	Republic, Mercury	Debuted at No. 16 on the Billboard 200
21	St. Paul & the Broken Bones	Angels in Science Fiction	ATO	
25	Taeyang	Down to Earth	The Black Label, Interscope	Debuted at No. 10 on the Circle Album Chart
27	Marina Sena	Vício Inerente	Sony Music Brazil	
28	Amir Obè	After.	Def Jam Recordings, UMG Recordings	
28	Baby Rose	Through and Through	Secretly Canadian	
28	Jessie Ware	That! Feels Good!	EMI	Debuted at No. 3 on the UK Albums Chart
28	Labrinth	Ends & Begins	Columbia, Sony Music	Debuted at No. 144 on the Billboard 200
28	Rum.gold	U Street Anthology	Leola	
28	Smokey Robinson	Gasms	TLR Records	

=== May ===
Day	Artist(s)	Album	Record label(s)	Entering chart position
4	iKon	Take Off	143	Debuted at No. 10 on the Circle Album Chart
4	Various artists	Queen Charlotte: A Bridgerton Story (Covers from the Netflix Series)	Netflix Music, Sony Masterworks	Debuted at No. 19 on the UK Soundtrack Albums Chart
5	Aespa	My World	SM, Warner, Dreamus	Debuted at No. 1 on the Circle Album Chart; Debuted at No. 9 on the Billboard 200
5	Durand Jones	Wait Til I Get Over	Dead Oceans	Debuted at No. 11 on the UK Independent Albums Chart
5	Emily King	Special Occasion	ATO Records	
5	Jidenna	Me, You & God	Wondaland Records, Magic Chief Productions	
5	Omarion	Full Circle: Sonic Book One	Omarion Worldwide	
12	Keke Palmer	Big Boss	Big Bosses Ent.	
12	Madison McFerrin	I Hope You Can Forgive Me	Self-released	
12	Njomza	Stages	Sincethe80s, Empire	
15	(G)I-dle	I Feel	Cube, Kakao	Debuted at No. 1 on the Circle Album Chart; Debuted at No. 41 on the Billboard 200
19	Angie Stone	Love Language	Conjunction, SoNo	
19	Sleep Token	Take Me Back to Eden	Spinefarm	Debuted at No. 3 on the UK Albums Chart; Debuted at No. 16 on the Billboard 200
19	Summer Walker	Clear 2: Soft Life	LVRN, Interscope Records	Debuted at No. 26 on the Billboard 200
26	D4vd	Petals to Thorns	Darkroom Records, Interscope Records	Debuted at No. 105 on the Billboard 200
26	KayCyy & Gesaffelstein	TW2052	Bu Vision, Columbia	
26	Lola Young	My Mind Wanders And Sometimes Leaves Completely	Island	
26	Manu Manzo	Luna En Geminis	Self-released	
26	Marco Mengoni	Materia (Prisma)	Sony Music Italy	Debuted at No. 1 on the FIMI Chart
26	Nonso Amadi	When It Blooms	Universal Music Canada. Def Jam, Polydor Records. MCA Records France. Universal Music Nigeria	Debuted at No. 105 on the TurnTable Albums Chart
26	Simply Red	Time	Warner Music	Debuted at No. 8 on the UK Albums Chart

=== June ===
Day	Artist(s)	Album	Record label(s)	Entering chart position
2	Ben Harper	Wide Open Light	Chrysalis	Debuted at No. 33 on the Swiss Albums Chart
2	Louise	Greatest Hits	Tag8, BMG	Debuted at No. 11 on the UK Albums Chart
2	Meshell Ndegeocello	The Omnichord Real Book	Blue Note	
2	Speakers Corner Quartet	Further Out Than the Edge	OTIH Records	
2	Witch	Zango	Desert Daze Sound	
7	Dami Im	In Between	ABC Music	Debuted at No. 65 on the ARIA Albums Chart
9	Amaarae	Fountain Baby	Golden Angel, Interscope Records	
9	Blk Odyssey	Diamonds & Freaks	Earthchild, Empire	
9	Col3trane	Chekhov's Gun	Trane of Thought Records, UnitedMasters	
9	Janelle Monáe	The Age of Pleasure	Wondaland Productions, Bad Boy Records	Debuted at No. 17 on the Billboard 200
9	Maeta	When I Hear Your Name	Roc Nation Records	
9	Pantayo	Ang Pagdaloy	Self-released	
9	SB19	Pagtatag!	Sony Philippines	
9	Selwyn Birchwood	Exorcist	Alligator Records	
16	Ambré	Who's Loving You?	Roc Nation Records	
16	Asake	Work of Art	YBNL Nation, Empire	Debuted at No. 66 on the Billboard 200
16	Bettye LaVette	LaVette!	Jay-Vee Records	Debuted at No. 13 on the UK R&B Albums Chart
16	Forest Claudette	Everything Was Green	Forest Claudette, Sony	
16	Kiana Ledé	Grudges	The Heavy Group, Republic Records	
17	Bright Vachirawit Chivaaree	Adolescent	RISER Music	
21	Sara Jo	Bez kontrole	Bassivity Digital	
23	I.M	Overdrive	Sony Music Korea	Debuted at No. 6 on the Circle Album Chart
24	Seyi Vibez	Thy Kingdom Come	Vibez Inc, Dvpper Music	Debuted at No. 2 on the TurnTable Albums Chart
26	Shinee	Hard	SM	Debuted at No. 2 on the Circle Album Chart
29	Terrace Martin	Fine Tune	Sounds of Crenshaw, BMG	
30	Ash Walker	Astronaut	Night Time Stories	
30	Olivia Dean	Messy	EMI	Debuted at No. 4 on the UK Albums Chart

=== July ===
Day	Artist(s)	Album	Record label(s)	Entering chart position
5	Kiss of Life	Kiss of Life	S2	Debuted at No. 18 on the Circle Album Chart
6	Lyanno	Midnight	Rimas Entertainment	
7	Anohni and the Johnsons	My Back Was a Bridge for You to Cross	Secretly Canadian	
7	FLO	3 of Us	Island Records	
7	Gabriels	Angels & Queens	Atlas Artists	Debuted at No. 3 on the UK Albums Chart
7	Little Dragon	Slugs of Love	Ninja Tune	Debuted at No. 26 on the UK Independent Albums Chart
10	EXO	Exist	SM, Kakao	Debuted at No. 1 on the Circle Album Chart
10	Gloria Groove	Lady Leste (Ao Vivo)	SB Music	
10	Zerobaseone	Youth in the Shade	WakeOne	Debuted at No. 2 on the Circle Album Chart
12	Sandara Park	Sandara Park	Abyss Company	
14	Mahalia	IRL	Warner Music UK	Debuted at No. 31 on the UK Albums Chart
14	Rita Ora	You & I	BMG	Debuted at No. 6 on the UK Albums Chart
17	Capella Grey	Here, Damn.	ALLEPAC THE FAMILY	
17	NCT Dream	ISTJ	SM, Kakao	Debuted at No. 1 on the Circle Album Chart; Debuted at No. 28 on the Billboard 200
19	The Sarz Academy Alumni	Memories That Last Forever 2	1789, United Masters, Warner Music Africa	
21	NewJeans	Get Up	ADOR, YG Plus	Debuted at No. 2 on the Circle Album Chart; Debuted at No. 1 on the Billboard 200
27	Kizz Daniel	Maverick	FlyBoy INC, Empire	
28	Adekunle Gold	Tequila Ever After	Def Jam Recordings, UMG Recordings	
28	Jessy Lanza	Love Hallucination	Hyperdub	
28	Roy Woods	Mixed Emotions	OVO Sound	
28	Tori Kelly	Tori	Epic, Beautiful Mind	
28	Treasure	Reboot	YG, Columbia	Debuted at No. 1 on the Circle Album Chart

=== August ===
Day	Artist(s)	Album	Record label(s)	Entering chart position
3	Iza	Afrodhit	Warner Music Brazil	
8	Olamide	Unruly	YBNL Nation, Empire	
11	Emotional Oranges	Still Emo	Avant Garden	
11	Jungle	Volcano	Caiola, AWAL	
18	Amaka	Oasis	Venice Music	
18	Cautious Clay	Karpeh	Blue Note Records	
18	Ciara	CiCi	Beauty Marks Entertainment	
18	Genesis Owusu	Struggler	OURNESS, AWAL	Debuted at No. 4 on the ARIA Albums Chart
18	Grace Potter	Mother Road	Fantasy	
18	Jihyo	Zone	JYP, Republic	Debuted at No. 1 on the Circle Album Chart; Debuted at No. 14 on the Billboard 200
18	Jon Batiste	World Music Radio	Verve, Interscope	Debuted at No. 104 on the Billboard 200
18	Leon Thomas	Electric Dusk	UMG Recordings, EZMNY Records, Motown Records	
18	Swavy	Different Breed	Columbia Records	
25	Burna Boy	I Told Them...	Atlantic, Spaceship, Bad Habit	Debuted at No. 31 on the Billboard 200
25	Fridayy	Fridayy	Lost In Melody, Def Jam Recordings	
25	Maluma	Don Juan	Sony Latin	Debuted at No. 195 on the Billboard 200
25	Terrace Martin & James Fauntleroy	Nova	Sounds of Crenshaw, BMG	
25	Victoria Monét	Jaguar II	Lovett Music, RCA Records	Debuted at No. 60 on the Billboard 200
28	NCT	Golden Age	SM, Kakao	Debuted at No. 1 on the Circle Album Chart; Debuted at No. 66 on the Billboard 200
30	Dominic Scott	Dear Summer	Red Balloon Works	

=== September ===
Day	Artist(s)	Album	Record label(s)	Entering chart position
1	Ama Lou	I Came Home Late	Interscope Records	
1	Tekno	The More The Better	Self-released	
5	Tirzah	Trip9love...???	Domino	
7	Majeeed	Cheers to Life	Dream Empire Music, Empire	Debuted at No. 34 on the TurnTable Top 50
8	Allison Russell	The Returner	Fantasy, Concord	Debuted at No. 56 on the UK Album Downloads
8	Teezo Touchdown	How Do You Sleep at Night?	RCA, Not Fit for Society	
8	Tinashe	BB/Ang3l	Nice Life Recording Company	Debuted at No. 32 on the Billboard US Top Album Sales
8	V	Layover	Big Hit	Debuted at No. 1 on the Circle Album Chart; Debuted at No. 2 on the Billboard 200
8	Yussef Dayes	Black Classical Music	Brownswood, Nonesuch	Debuted at No. 4 on the UK Independent Albums Chart
15	Alan Palomo	World of Hassle	Mom + Pop	
15	Cleo Sol	Heaven	Forever Living Originals	
15	Corinne Bailey Rae	Black Rainbows	Black Rainbows Music, Thirty Tigers	Debuted at No. 13 on the UK Independent Albums Chart
15	Diddy	The Love Album: Off the Grid	Love Records, Motown Records	Debuted at No. 19 on the Billboard 200
15	Rod Wave	Nostalgia	Alamo	Debuted at No. 1 on the Billboard 200
15	Stephen Marley	Old Soul	Ghetto Youths International	
15	Teddy Swims	I've Tried Everything but Therapy (Part 1)	Warner	Debuted at No. 61 on the Billboard 200
22	Bakar	Halo	Black Butter	Debuted at No. 15 on the UK Albums Chart
22	Doja Cat	Scarlet	Kemosabe, RCA	Debuted at No. 4 on the Billboard 200
22	Dominique Fils-Aimé	Our Roots Run Deep	Ensoul Records	
22	K. Michelle	I'm the Problem	Chase Landin, MNRK	
22	Stephen Sanchez	Angel Face	Mercury, Republic	Debuted at No. 90 on the Billboard 200
27	XG	New DNA	Xgalx	Debuted at No. 8 on the Circle Album Chart
29	Beverley Knight	The Fifth Chapter	Tag8 Music, BMG Rights Management	Debuted at No. 39 on the UK Albums Chart
29	Cleo Sol	Gold	Forever Living Originals	
29	Feid	Mor, No Le Temas a la Oscuridad	Universal Latino	Debuted at No. 31 on the Billboard 200
29	Grace Weber	Paperflower	Self-released	
29	Jorja Smith	Falling or Flying	FAMM	Debuted at No. 3 on the UK Albums Chart
29	ROMderful	Ice Cream Clones 2	Self-released	
29	Say She She	Silver	Karma Chief Records	

=== October ===
Day	Artist(s)	Album	Record label(s)	Entering chart position
4	Bnxn	Sincerely, Benson	T.Y.E., Empire	Debuted at No. 2 on the TurnTable Albums Chart
6	Drake	For All the Dogs	OVO Sound, Republic Records	Debuted at No. 1 on the Billboard 200
6	Joy Denalane	Willpower	Lesedi, Four	Debuted at No. 33 on the Offizielle Top 100
6	NCT 127	Fact Check	SM	Debuted at No. 1 on the Circle Album Chart; Debuted at No. 16 on the Billboard 200
6	Odumodublvck	Eziokwu	Native Records, Def Jam Recordings, UMG Recordings	
6	Vedo	7	New Wav Music Group, Empire	
11	JMSN	Soft Spot	White Room Records	
13	Jamila Woods	Water Made Us	Jagjaguwar	
13	Troye Sivan	Something to Give Each Other	EMI Music Australia	Debuted at No. 1 on the ARIA Albums Chart; Debuted at No. 20 on the Billboard 200
13	Yamê	Elowi	DBS, Naïve	Debuted at No. 10 on the SNEP Chart
20	Arin Ray	Phases III	Interscope Records	
20	Berhana	Amén (The Nomad's Dream)	EQT Recordings	
20	Brandon Lake	Coat of Many Colors	Provident Label Group	Debuted at No. 135 on the Billboard 200
20	Naomi Sharon	Obsidian	OVO Sound	
20	Priya Ragu	Santhosam	Warner Records UK	Debuted at No. 94 on the Swiss Albums Chart
20	RealestK	Real World	Columbia Records	
20	Sampha	Lahai	Young	Debuted at No. 21 on the UK Albums Chart
20	Shay Lia	Facets	AWAL	
20	Terrace Martin & Alex Isley	I Left My Heart In Ladera	Sounds of Crenshaw, IRD Corp, BMG	
27	Black Pumas	Chronicles of a Diamond	ATO	Debuted at No. 69 on the Billboard 200
27	Blaqbonez	Emeka Must Shine	Chocolate City	Debuted at No. 7 on the TurnTable Top 50
27	Brent Faiyaz	Larger than Life	ISO Supremacy, UnitedMasters	Debuted at No. 11 on the Billboard 200
27	Chxrry22	Siren	XO Records, Republic Records, UMG Recordings	
27	Leela James	Thought U Knew	BMG	
27	Mariah the Scientist	To Be Eaten Alive	Buckles Laboratories, Epic Records, Sony Music	Debuted at No. 93 on the Billboard 200
27	Mr Eazi	The Evil Genius	emPawa Africa Limited	
27	Robert Finley	Black Bayou	Easy Eye Sound	
27	Ruben Studdard	The Way I Remember	SoNo Recording Group	
27	V V Brown	Am I British Yet?	YOY Records	

=== November ===
Day	Artist(s)	Album	Record label(s)	Entering chart position
1	WayV	On My Youth	Label V, SM, Dreamus	Debuted at No. 5 on the Oricon Albums Chart
3	Emilia	.MP3	Sony Latin, WK	Debuted at No. 2 on the CAPIF Albums Chart
3	Goapele	Colours	Skyblaze	
3	Majid Jordan	Good People	OVO Sound	
3	Tkay Maidza	Sweet Justice	4AD	Debuted at No. 11 on the UK Independent Albums Chart
3	Zoe Wees	Therapy	Valeria, Capitol	Debuted at No. 15 on the Offizielle Top 100
8	Kiss of Life	Born to Be XX	S2	Debuted at No. 49 on the Circle Album Chart
8	Soojin	Agassy	BRD	Debuted at No. 7 on the Circle Album Chart
9	Jacob Latimore	Closure	FTE	
10	BJ the Chicago Kid	Gravy	RCA Records, Sony Music	
10	Brandy	Christmas with Brandy	Motown, Brand Nu, UMG	Debuted at No. 29 on the Billboard US Top Holiday Albums
10	Chris Brown	11:11	CBE, RCA Records	Debuted at No. 9 on the Billboard 200
10	Miguel Atwood-Ferguson	Les Jardins Mystiques, Vol. 1	Brainfeeder	
13	Red Velvet	Chill Kill	SM, Kakao	Debuted at No. 1 on the Circle Album Chart
17	Arcángel	Sentimiento, Elegancia y Más Maldad	Rimas	Debuted at No. 195 on the Billboard 200
17	Enhypen	Orange Blood	Belift Lab, YG Plus	Debuted at No. 4 on the Billboard 200
17	October London	The Greatest Gift	Death Row Records	
17	Qing Madi	Qing Madi	Jton Music	
17	Queen Naija	After the Butterflies	UMG	
17	Sneek (Terrace Martin & Gallant)	Sneek	O'Connor/Lowly	
17	TeaMarr	You Should Prolly Sit Down for This	Raedio	
21	Miach	Insomnia	Yem	
27	Taeyeon	To. X	SM	Debuted at No. 2 on the Circle Album Chart

=== December ===
Day	Artist(s)	Album	Record label(s)	Entering chart position
1	Sean Leon	In Loving Memory	Self-released	
8	James Fauntleroy	The Warmest Winter Ever	Self-released	
8	Tate McRae	Think Later	RCA	Debuted at No. 4 on the Billboard 200
15	Omarion	Full Circle: Sonic Book Two	Omarion Worldwide	
15	Various artists	The Color Purple (Music from and Inspired By)	WaterTowerMusic, Gamma	
22	NCT 127	Be There for Me	SM	
24	Adam Blackstone	A Legacy Christmas	BASSic Black Entertainment Records, Anderson Music Group, Empire	
26	TVXQ	20&2	SM, Kakao	Debuted at No. 3 on the Circle Album Chart

== Highest-charting songs ==
=== United States ===
R&B songs from any year which charted in the 2023 Top 40 of the Billboard Hot 100
Song	Artist	Project	Peak position
"Die for You"	The Weeknd and Ariana Grande	Starboy	1
"Slime You Out"	Drake featuring SZA	For All the Dogs	1
"Kill Bill"	SZA	SOS	1
"Snooze"	SZA	SOS	2
"Creepin'"	Metro Boomin, the Weeknd and 21 Savage	Heroes & Villains	3
"Cuff It"	Beyoncé	Renaissance	6
"Sure Thing"	Miguel	All I Want Is You	11
"Under the Influence"	Chris Brown	Indigo	12
"Double Fantasy"	The Weeknd featuring Future	The Idol	18
"Bahamas Promises"	Drake	For All the Dogs	20
"Tried Our Best"	Drake	For All the Dogs	21
"Escapism"	Raye featuring 070 Shake	My 21st Century Blues	22
"Last Time I Saw You"	Nicki Minaj	Pink Friday 2	23
"Members Only"	Drake featuring PartyNextDoor	For All the Dogs	24
"Good Good"	Usher, Summer Walker and 21 Savage	Coming Home	25
"What It Is (Block Boy)"	Doechii featuring Kodak Black	TBA	29
"BBL Love (Interlude)"	Drake	For All the Dogs	36
"Polar Opposites"	Drake	For All the Dogs	37
"America Has a Problem"	Beyoncé featuring Kendrick Lamar	Renaissance	38

=== United Kingdom ===
R&B songs from any year which charted in the 2023 Top 10 of the UK Singles Chart
Song	Artist	Project	Peak position
"Escapism"	Raye featuring 070 Shake	My 21st Century Blues	1

== Highest first-week consumption ==
List of albums with the highest first-week consumption (sales + streaming + track equivalent), as of November 2023 in the United States
Number	Album	Artist	1st-week consumption	1st-week position	Refs
1	Nostalgia	Rod Wave	137,000	1	
2	Red Moon in Venus	Kali Uchis	55,000	4	
3	11:11	Chris Brown	45,000	9	
4	Love Sick	Don Toliver	40,500	8	
5	Gloria	Sam Smith	39,000	7	

== All critically reviewed albums ranked ==
=== Metacritic ===
Number	Artist	Album	Average score	Number of reviews	Reference
1	Amaarae	Fountain Baby	95	8 reviews	
2	Corinne Bailey Rae	Black Rainbows	91	10 reviews	
3	Jessie Ware	That! Feels Good!	89	19 reviews	
4	Yazmin Lacey	Voice Notes	89	4 reviews	
5	Durand Jones	Wait Til I Get Over	88	7 reviews	
6	Sampha	Lahai	87	12 reviews	
7	Victoria Monét	Jaguar II	87	8 reviews	
8	Kelela	Raven	86	18 reviews	
9	Liv.e	Girl in the Half Pearl	85	7 reviews	
10	Eddie Chacon	Sundown	85	6 reviews	
11	Billy Valentine	Billy Valentine & The Universal Truth	85	4 reviews	
12	Kali Uchis	Red Moon in Venus	84	13 reviews	
13	Tirzah	Trip9love	84	9 reviews	
14	Jamila Woods	Water Made Us	84	8 reviews	
15	Bettye LaVette	LaVette!	84	8 reviews	
16	V V Brown	Am I British Yet?	84	4 reviews	
17	Cleo Sol	Heaven	83	6 reviews	
18	Gabriels	Angels & Queens	83	8 reviews	
19	Mahalia	IRL	81	9 reviews	
20	Meshell Ndegeocello	The Omnichord Real Book	81	8 reviews	
21	Say She She	Silver	81	5 reviews	
22	Cautious Clay	Karpeh	80	4 reviews	
23	Lola Young	My Mind Wanders And Sometimes Leaves Completely	79	5 reviews	
24	Priya Ragu	Santhosam	79	5 reviews	
25	Janelle Monáe	The Age of Pleasure	78	18 reviews	
26	Tkay Maidza	Sweet Justice	77	7 reviews	
27	Madison McFerrin	I Hope You Can Forgive Me	77	5 reviews	
28	St. Paul & the Broken Bones	Angels in Science Fiction	77	5 reviews	
29	Black Pumas	Chronicles of a Diamond	76	10 reviews	
30	Little Dragon	Slugs of Love	76	7 reviews	
31	Selwyn Birchwood	Exorcist	76	5 reviews	
32	Jorja Smith	Falling or Flying	74	13 reviews	
33	Daniel Caesar	Never Enough	72	5 reviews	
34	Miguel Atwood-Ferguson	Les Jardins Mystiques, Vol. 1	72	4 reviews	
35	Dinner Party	Enigmatic Society	70	5 reviews	
36	Jon Batiste	World Music Radio	69	5 reviews	
37	Sam Smith	Gloria	68	17 reviews	
38	6lack	Since I Have a Lover	68	6 reviews	
39	Speakers Corner Quartet	Further Out Than the Edge	68	5 reviews	
40	Don Toliver	Love Sick	68	5 reviews	
41	Bakar	Halo	68	4 reviews	
42	Chlöe	In Pieces	62	8 reviews	
43	Teezo Touchdown	How Do You Sleep at Night?	56	7 reviews	

=== AnyDecentMusic? ===
Number	Artist	Album	Average score	Number of reviews	Reference
1	Jessie Ware	That! Feels Good!	8.4	20 reviews	
2	Kelela	Raven	8.0	20 reviews	
3	Jamila Woods	Water Made Us	8.0	11 reviews	
4	Amaarae	Fountain Baby	7.9	6 reviews	
5	Victoria Monét	Jaguar II	7.7	7 reviews	
6	Mahalia	IRL	7.7	12 reviews	
7	Liv.e	Girl in the Half Pearl	7.4	5 reviews	
8	Janelle Monáe	The Age of Pleasure	7.3	19 reviews	
9	Jorja Smith	Falling or Flying	7.3	15 reviews	

== See also ==
- Previous article: 2022 in rhythm and blues
- Next article: 2024 in rhythm and blues
