= Austin Peralta =

American jazz pianist (1990–2012)

- Born: Austin Topper Peralta; October 25, 1990; Los Angeles, California, U.S.
- Died: November 21, 2012 (aged 22) Los Angeles, California, U.S.
- Genres: Jazz
- Occupation: Pianist
- Years active: 2006–2012

Austin Peralta (October 25, 1990 – November 21, 2012) was an American jazz pianist and composer from Los Angeles, California. He was the son of film director and Z-Boys skateboarder Stacy Peralta.

== Early life ==
Austin Peralta was born on October 25, 1990, to filmmaker Joni Caldwell and Z-Boys skateboarder and film director Stacy Peralta. Peralta started playing piano at the age of five and was soon recognized as a prodigy. At age 10 while learning classical piano, he developed an interest in jazz when a friend gave him a Bill Evans CD. In 2003 at age 12, Peralta was awarded the Shelly Manne New Talent Award by the Los Angeles Jazz Society, which was presented to him by Quincy Jones. In addition to the piano, Peralta also played the upright bass, drums and saxophone. He was an honor student at Crossroads School for Arts and Sciences in Santa Monica. Peralta studied classical piano for five years at Pepperdine University and later with jazz pianist Alan Pasqua and saxophonist Buddy Collette.

== Career ==
At a young age Peralta performed in Los Angeles with the Gerald Wilson Orchestra at venues such as the Jazz Bakery and the Blue Whale jazz club. At age 15, he performed at the 2006 Tokyo Jazz Festival with his group, The Hour Trio, and with Chick Corea and Hank Jones. He has also had multiple performances at the California Institute of the Arts; the first being a collaboration with David Wexler (aka Dr. Strangeloop) in the summer of 2010, and the second as the Austin Peralta Group in 2012.

In 2006, he released two albums: Maiden Voyage with bassist Ron Carter and Mantra with bassist Buster Williams. In 2007, he performed at the Java Jazz Festival.

In 2011, Peralta met Steven Ellison (a.k.a. Flying Lotus) through mutual friend David Wexler. Peralta joined Ellison's Brainfeeder label, which released his final album, Endless Planets. Ellison considered Peralta's addition to the label a turning point in the label's expansion of genres and movement towards jazz. Peralta said that he did not promote his first two albums because the producer did not allow him to express his artistic vision. Under the Brainfeeder record label, however, he was free to defy conventional genres and express spirituality through his music.

Peralta composed and performed the score for the remastered documentary What Happened to Kerouac? (2012) and appeared on the track "DMT Song" on the album Until the Quiet Comes (2012). Peralta was a touring member of jazz group The Cinematic Orchestra and performed regularly with Allan Holdsworth and Virgil Donati.

Peralta was a regular collaborator with Flying Lotus and Thundercat and made recordings with Teebs, Strangeloop, and Erykah Badu.

Peralta was interviewed in the documentary film Being in the World by Tao Ruspoli, which includes a brief performance interlude in support of the interview (available in full on YouTube).

== Death ==
Peralta died on November 21, 2012, at the age of 22. The LA County Coroner's Report indicated the most likely cause of death was viral pneumonia aggravated by a combination of alcohol and drugs.

== Deathgasm Ensemble ==
The ensemble name Deathgasm is an inspiration from the Bardo Thodol (the so-called Tibetan Book of the Dead) and the Gaspar Noé film Enter the Void. Peralta felt that his music had the power to evoke spiritual places similar to death, orgasm, love, or "whatever". So he decided to name his ensemble Deathgasm.

Personnel

- Austin Peralta – leader
- Miguel Atwood-Ferguson – violin, viola
- Sam Gendel – saxophone
- Ryan McGillicuddy – bass
- Zach Harmon – drums, tabla
- Ian Simon (Earnest Blount) – electronics, laptop
- Ben Olsen – video/photography

== The Peralta/Strangeloop Project ==
Peralta and Strangeloop (another Brainfeeder artist) met at a coffee shop when Strangeloop ranted to him about the apocalypse. Peralta found him like-minded and ended up connecting, becoming best friends. Strangeloop's music is more electronic and Peralta wanted to introduce that world into his acoustic style of music. Peralta felt that something was missing in his Endless Planet's project that was in the works and decided to tie Strangeloop's work into his. They performed live together at the Roy O. Disney Theatre on July 7, 2010, and numerous other occasions.

== Discography ==
- Maiden Voyage (Eighty-Eight's) (2005)
- Mantra (Eighty-Eight's) (2006)
- Endless Planets (Brainfeeder) (2011)

Singles

- Views of Saturn Vol. 2 (2012)

with The Hour Trio

- Inta' Out (2005)

Guest appearances

- Thundercat - Apocalypse (Ten Year Anniversary 'Memento Mori' Edition) (2024)
- Miguel Atwood-Ferguson - Les Jardins Mystiques, Vol. 1 (Brainfeeder, 2023)
- Pan African Peoples Arkestra – 60 Years (2023)
- John Carter Egizi - 'Jazz Prodigies' (2021)
- Shafiq Husayn - 'The Loop' (2019)
- Various Artists - 'Brainfeeder X' (2018)
- Natasha Agrama - 'The Heart of Infinite Change' (2017)
- Bunny Brunel – 'Invent Your Future' (2015)
- Miguel Atwood-Ferguson - 'Unreleased Vol. 2' (2014)
- Natasha Agrama - 'The Brave One' (2014)
- Grey Reverend - 'A Hero's Lie' (2013)
- Octavious Womack – 'Superstar' (2012)
- Franky Rousseau Large Band - 'Hope' (2012)
- Flying Lotus - Until the Quiet Comes (2012)
- Teebs - Collections 01 (2011)
- Thundercat - The Golden Age of Apocalypse (2011)
- Strangeloop - "Fields" (2011)
- Erykah Badu - "New Amerykah Part Two: Return of the Ankh" (2010)
- Shafiq Husayn - "En' A-Free-Ka" (2009)
- Tim Ries - "Stones World: The Rolling Stones Project II" (2007)
- Adam Rudolph & Go: Organic Orchestra - "Thought Forms" (2006)
