= Sharecropper's Son =

Studio album by Robert Finley
- Released: May 21, 2021
- Studio: Easy Eye (Nashville, Tennessee)
- Genre: Soul blues
- Length: 39:21
- Language: English
- Label: Easy Eye Sound
- Producer: Dan Auerbach

Robert Finley chronology
Goin' Platinum! (2017)	Sharecropper's Son (2021)	Black Bayou (2023)

Sharecropper's Son is a 2021 studio album by American blues musician Robert Finley. The album has received positive reviews from critics.

== Reception ==
According to the review aggregator Metacritic, Sharecropper's Son received "universal acclaim" based on a weighted average score of 81 out of 100 from 5 critic scores. Editors at AllMusic rated this album 4 out of 5 stars, with critic Thom Jurek writing that on this album, "Finley, producer Dan Auerbach, and their all-star studio cast pull out all the stops; they present this remarkable singer with an expansive yet rootsy musical palette". Hal Horowitz of American Songwriter rated this album 4 out of 5 stars, calling it "a bigger, fatter and tougher sound" than Finley's previous work. Jim Hynes of Glide Magazine called this "one of Auerbach’s bigger projects" that "will likely receive much consideration for awards and year-end lists". In Mojo, Lois Wilson rated this album 4 out of 5 stars, calling the musicians "a top-notch band". Editors of Spill Magazine chose this as an Editor's Pick and critic Ljubinko Zivkovic gave it a 9 out of 10 and characterized the music as "simply brilliant". Sharon O'Connell of Uncut scored Sharecropper's Son a 7 out of 10, stating that "Finley's story deserves telling and that wider recognition is long overdue".

== Track listing ==
1. "Souled Out on You" (Dan Auerbach, Robert Finley, and Bobby Wood) – 3:33
2. "Make Me Feel Alright" (Auerbach, Finley, and Pat McLaughlin) – 3:43
3. "Country Child" (Auerbach and Finley) – 5:29
4. "Sharecropper's Son" (Auerbach, Finley, and Wood) – 3:06
5. "My Story" (Auerbach, Finley, and McLaughlin) – 3:14
6. "Starting to See" (Auerbach, Finley, and Wood) – 2:54
7. "I Can Feel Your Pain" (Auerbach, Finley, and McLaughlin) – 3:37
8. "Better Than I Treat Myself" (Auerbach, Finley, and Wood) – 3:47
9. "Country Boy" (Auerbach and Finley) – 5:44
10. "All My Hope" (Edmond Martin Cash and David Crowder) – 4:14

== Personnel ==
- Robert Finley – vocals
- Roy Agee – trombone
- Dan Auerbach – electric guitar, percussion, backing vocals, mixing, production
- Sam Bacco – percussion
- Kenny Brown – electric guitar
- Gene Chrisman – drums
- Jeffrey Clemens – drums
- Evan Cobb – saxophone
- Michael Deano – assistant engineering
- Eric Deaton – bass guitar
- Matt DeMerritt – saxophone
- Josh Ditty – engineering
- Alysse Gafkjen – photography
- Leisa Hans – backing vocals
- Ray Jacildo – Hammond B3
- Christy Johnson – backing vocals
- Jelly Roll Johnson – harmonica
- Trey Keller – engineering
- Pat McLaughlin – backing vocals
- Nick Movshon – bass guitar
- Russ Pahl – electric guitar
- M. Allen Parker – engineering, mixing
- Steve Patrick – trumpet
- Dave Roe – bass guitar
- Mike Rojas – clavinet, Hammond B3, Mellotron, piano
- Billy Sanford – dobro, electric guitar, gut string guitar, percussion
- Fabio Santana De Souza – trombone
- Perry Shall – design, layout
- Todd Simon – euphonium, flugelhorn, trumpet
- Mickey Smay – assistant engineering
- Ryan Smith – mastering
- Caleb VanBuskirk – engineering
- Ashley Wilcoxson – backing vocals
- Bobby Wood – clavinet, Hammond B3, electric piano, piano, Wurlitzer piano

== See also ==
- 2021 in American music
- List of 2021 albums
