= Goin' Platinum! =

Studio album by Robert Finley
- Released: December 8, 2017
- Studio: Easy Eye (Nashville, Tennessee)
- Genre: Soul blues
- Length: 31:35
- Language: English
- Label: Easy Eye Sound
- Producer: Dan Auerbach

Robert Finley chronology
Age Don't Mean a Thing (2016)	Goin' Platinum! (2017)	Sharecropper's Son (2021)

Goin' Platinum! is a 2017 studio album by American blues musician Robert Finley. The release is Finley's first of several collaborations with Dan Auerbach and has received positive reviews from critics.

== Reception ==
According to the review aggregator Metacritic, Goin' Platinum! received "universal acclaim" based on a weighted average score of 81 out of 100 from 7 critic scores. In Evening Standard, editors included this among the best albums of the week and critic Rick Pearson rated it 4 out of 5 stars, calling it "another masterclass in rhythm and blues". Dave Simpson of The Guardian rated Goin' Platinum! 3 out of 5 stars, calling the music "retro-modern" that is "steeped in blues and soul and a lot of fun" and finished by writing that "the big-hearted Louisiana man certainly deserves his chance" to go platinum. Andy Gill of The Independent scored this work 4 out of 5 stars, crediting Dan Auerbach with getting "a top session crew to create the crisp, punchy funk, loping boogies and brooding soul-blues grooves capable of bringing out the full extent of Finley’s talents". Kitty Empire of The Observer gave this album 4 out of 5 stars, calling it "a lush, teak-panelled Nashville soul record". In Record Collector, Lois Wilson gave this album 4 out of 5 stars for elevating Finley's work from his debut album, comparing this music to Solomon Burke, Syl Johnson, and Al Green.

== Track listing ==
1. "Get It While You Can" (Dan Auerbach, Pat McLaughlin, and John Prine) – 2:35
2. "Medicine Woman" (Auerbach, Roger Cook, and Bobby Wood) – 2:37
3. "If You Forget My Love" (Auerbach, David Ferguson, and McLaughlin) – 3:42
4. "Three Jumpers" (Auerbach) – 3:14
5. "Honey, Let Me Stay the Night" (Auerbach and McLaughlin) – 3:30
6. "You Don’t Have to Do Right" (Auerbach, Ferguson, and McLaughlin) – 3:18
7. "Complications" (Auerbach, Cook, and Wood) – 2:55
8. "Real Love Is Like Hard Time" (Auerbach and Nick Lowe) – 3:34
9. "Empty Arms" (Auerbach) – 2:47
10. "Holy Wine" (Auerbach, Ferguson, and McLaughlin) – 3:29

== Personnel ==
- Robert Finley – vocals
- Austin Atwood – engineering
- Dan Auerbach – bass guitar, acoustic guitar, electric guitar, Mellotron, percussion, backing vocals, mixing, production
- Gene Chrisman – drums on "Holy Wine", percussion on "Holy Wine"
- Jeffrey Clemens – drums, percussion
- Josh Ditty – engineer
- Richard Dodd – mastering
- Duane Eddy – guitar on "You Don't Have to Do Right"
- Alysse Gafkjen – photography
- Shawn Gough – assistant engineering
- Leisa Hans – clapping, vocals, backing vocals
- Ray Jacildo – harpsichord, keyboard bass, organ, trombone
- Ronell Johnson – trombone
- Clint Maedgen – saxophone
- Pat McLaughlin – backing vocals on "Honey, Let Me Stay the Night" and "You Don't Have to Do Right"
- Russ Pahl – acoustic guitar, electric guitar
- Allen Parker – engineering, mixing
- Dave Roe – upright bass on "You Don't Have to Do Right"
- Perry Shall – design, layout
- Alex Skelton – assistant engineering
- Ashley Wilcoxson – clapping, vocals, backing vocals
- Bobby Wood – chimes, congas, glockenspiel, marimba, percussion, piano, vibraphone, Wurlitzer

== See also ==
- 2017 in American music
- List of 2017 albums
