= Synonym (album) =

Studio album by Meshell Ndegeocello
- Released: October 2, 2026
- Studios: Burns Ave (Los Angeles); Applehead (Saugerties); The Shed (Long Beach); Sound City (Los Angeles); Studio 537 (North Palm Beach); Keyboard Heaven (Brooklyn); Earseed (Brooklyn); Sonic Ranch (El Paso); AcousTech (Atlanta); Nest (Los Angeles); Ollywood (Los Angeles); Konk (London); Ella Bella (New York); Lucy's Meat Market (Los Angeles); Benny's House (Pasadena); Béla's Home; Diamond Mine West (Pasadena); Stampede Origin (Chicago); Iguana (London); EQT (Los Angeles); Chaplin (Los Angeles); Canal Street Communications (New York); Boulevard (Los Angeles); Reservoir (New York); Estuary (Austin)
- Length: 62:03
- Label: Blue Note
- Producers: David Gamson; Meshell Ndegeocello; Abe Rounds

Meshell Ndegeocello chronology
No More Water: The Gospel of James Baldwin (2024)	Synonym (2026)

Professional ratings
Review scores
Source	Rating
AllMusic	3.5/5 stars
The Guardian	4/5 stars
PopMatters	8/10

Synonym is a studio album by the American musician Meshell Ndegeocello, released on October 2, 2026, by Blue Note Records. It features guest appearances from Chaka Khan, Cat Power, Brandi Carlile, Anohni and others.

The first single, a cover of Aretha Franklin and George Michael's "I Knew You Were Waiting (For Me)", was released on July 15, 2026. "Don't You Want Me", originally by the Human League, was released on August 7, 2026. A cover of Bob Dylan's "With God on Our Side" featuring Bill Callahan and Chris Thile, was released on September 18, 2026.

== Track listing ==
Synonym track listing
No.	Title	Writer(s)	Producer(s)	Length
1.	"I Knew You Were Waiting (For Me)" (with Cynthia Erivo)	Simon Climie; Dennis Morgan	David Gamson; Abe Rounds; Meshell Ndegeocello	4:46
2.	"Don't You Want Me" (with Cat Power)	Jo Callis; Philip Oakey; Philip Adrian Wright	Rounds; Gamson; Ndegeocello	4:36
3.	"Don't Stop the Music" (with Nick Hakim and Robert Glasper)	Jonah Ellis; Alisa Peoples; Lonnie Simmons	Rounds; Ndegeocello	4:39
4.	"Islands in the Stream" (with Chaka Khan)	Barry Gibb; Maurice Gibb; Robin Gibb	Gamson; Rounds; Ndegeocello	4:34
5.	"It Ain't Me Babe" (with Madison Cunningham)	Bob Dylan	Rounds; Ndegeocello; Madison Cunningham^{[a]}	4:20
6.	"Always on Time"" (with Laura Lee)	Ja Rule; 7 Aurelius; Gotti	Rounds; Ndegeocello	4:01
7.	"Be Real Black for Me" (with Lizz Wright and Emily King)	Charles Mann; Donny Hathaway; Roberta Flack	Rounds; Ndegeocello; Chris Bruce^{[a]}	3:50
8.	"Don't Look Any Further" (with Lianne La Havas)	Franne Golde; Dennis Lambert; Duane Hitchings	Gamson; Rounds; Ndegeocello	4:03
9.	"The Closer I Get to You" (with Destin Conrad and Moses Sumney)	James Mtume; Reggie Lucas	Gamson; Rounds; Ndegeocello; Deantoni Parks^{[a]}	3:40
10.	"Golden Ring" (with Brandi Carlile)	Bobby Braddock; Rafe Van Hoy	Rounds; Ndegeocello; Jake Sherman^{[a]}	3:19
11.	"I Got You Babe" (with Anohni)	Sonny Bono	Rounds; Ndegeocello; Levon Henry^{[a]}	3:20
12.	"Here We Come (Here He Comes)" (with Evann McIntosh)	Brian Eno	Gamson; Rounds; Ndegeocello	3:45
13.	"Guilty" (with Ink)	B. Gibb; M. Gibb; R. Gibb	Rounds; Ndegeocello; Sherman^{[a]}	4:28
14.	"Hunger Strike" (with Willow)	Chris Cornell	Rounds; Ndegeocello; Willow^{[a]}	3:03
15.	"With God on Our Side" (with Bill Callahan and Chris Thile)	Dylan	Rounds; Ndegeocello; Jebin Bruni^{[a]}	5:38
Total length:				62:03

=== Note ===
- ^{^[a]} indicates an additional producer
- "Here We Come (Here He Comes)" is an adaptation of "Here He Comes", written by Brian Eno.

== Personnel ==
Credits are adapted from the album's liner notes.

=== Musicians ===
- Meshell Ndegeocello – arrangement (all tracks), bass (tracks 1–6, 12), vocals (1, 2, 4–14), background vocals (3, 15)
- Abe Rounds – arrangement (all tracks), drums (1–8, 10–13), percussion (1–8, 11, 13), rhythm guitar (2), bass (4, 8), background vocals (6), string arrangement (7), acoustic guitar (8, 13); piano, tabla (14); drum machine programming (15)
- Chris Bruce – electric guitar (1, 2, 12), acoustic guitar (1, 3, 7, 9), arrangement (1, 3, 7, 15), guitar (6), bass (11), drum machine programming (15)
- Josh Johnson – saxophone solo (1, 13), horns (2–4, 13), horn arrangement (2, 3)
- Jebin Bruni – keyboards (1, 2, 10, 15), arrangement (1, 3, 12, 15), synthesizer (1, 7), Mellotron (3), church bells (7), piano (12, 15), Moog bass (15)
- David Gamson – arrangement, sound design (1, 2, 4, 8, 9, 12); programming (1, 2, 8, 9), keyboards (1, 4, 8, 9), rhythm guitar (1)
- Jake Sherman – organ (1, 3, 4, 7, 10), piano (1, 4, 10), Rhodes (1, 4); synth bass, synthesizer (3); arrangement (10, 13); keyboards, Moog bass, vibraphone (13)
- Cynthia Erivo – vocals (1)
- Cat Power – vocals (2)
- Nick Hakim – vocals (3), vocal dub effects (6)
- Deantoni Parks – live drum programming (3, 9, 11), drum set (9, 11), arrangement (9)
- Robert Glasper – vocals, vocoder, piano (3)
- Benny Bock – Oberheim Four Voice synthesizer (4, 14); synthesizer, ARP 2600, Marxophone, Rhodes (5)
- Oliver Leiber – rhythm guitar, EBow (4); electric guitar, acoustic guitar (11)
- Chaka Khan – vocals (4)
- Nayanna Holley – background vocals (4)
- Ella Feingold – electric dream guitar (4)
- Hanna Benn – background vocal arrangement, background vocals (5)
- Alan Hampton – Harmony bass (5), acoustic bass (10)
- Béla Fleck – banjo (5)
- Madison Cunningham – vocals, piano, electric guitar (5)
- Larry Goldings – arrangement, Rhodes, keyboards (6, 9); Mellotron (6), organ (11)
- Laura Lee – vocals, bass (6)
- Gabe Noel – string arrangement, bass, cello, bass harmonica (7)
- Emily King – background vocal arrangement, vocals (7)
- Lizz Wright – vocals (7)
- Wendy Melvoin – 12-string acoustic guitar (7)
- Elena Pinderhughes – flute (8, 11)
- Lianne La Havas – vocals, electric guitar (8)
- Destin Conrad – vocals (9)
- Moses Sumney – vocals (9)
- Brandi Carlile – vocals, background vocals, arrangement (10)
- Levon Henry – arrangement, horn arrangement, horns (11)
- Anohni – vocals (11)
- Evann McIntosh – vocals (12)
- Ink – vocals (13)
- Doyle Bramhall II – electric guitar (14, 15), EBow (14)
- Willow – arrangement, vocals, drums (14)
- Bill Callahan – vocals, electric guitar (15)
- Chris Thile – vocals, mandolin (15)

=== Technical and creative ===
- Abe Rounds – recording (all tracks), mixing (6, 11)
- David Gamson – recording (1, 2, 4, 8, 9, 12)
- Chris Bittner – recording (1, 3, 9, 11)
- Gregg White – recording (1)
- Meshell Ndegeocello – recording (2–5, 7–9, 11–13, 15)
- Adam Blastevic – Cat Power vocal recording (2)
- Lily Wen – recording (3, 11)
- Nick Hakim – recording (3, 6)
- Chris Sorem – recording (4, 7, 13–15), additional engineering (10)
- Matt Jaggar – recording (4, 7)
- George Chong – recording (4, 7)
- Reed Lovell – recording (4)
- Ella Feingold – recording (4)
- Béla Fleck – recording (5)
- Wayne Gordon – recording (6)
- Ryan Freeland – recording (7), mixing (10)
- Emily King – recording (7)
- Jake Sherman – recording (8, 10, 13)
- Louie Lastic – recording (9)
- Moses Sumney – recording (9)
- Todd Monfalcone – recording (10)
- Ryan Kelly – recording (11)
- Levon Henry – recording (11)
- Pete Min – recording (11)
- Clay Blair – recording (14)
- James Yost – recording (15)
- John Michael Landon – recording (15)
- Sebastian Reunert – recording assistance (1)
- Brandon Bell – additional engineering (10)
- Eric J Dubowsky – mixing (1–6, 8, 9, 12, 14)
- Mendy Stein – mix engineering assistance (1–6, 8, 9, 12, 14)
- Marton Bisits – editing assistance
- Chris Gehringer – mastering
- Dea Brogaard Thompson – production coordination
- Ryan Sanders – art direction, design

== Charts ==
=== Weekly charts ===
Weekly chart performance for Synonym
Chart (2026)	Peak position
Belgian Albums (Ultratop Flanders)	113
French Physical Albums (SNEP)	101
Swedish Jazz Albums (Sverigetopplistan)	10
Swiss Albums (Schweizer Hitparade)	68
UK Album Downloads (Official Charts)	36
UK R&B Albums (Official Charts)	7

=== Monthly charts ===
Monthly chart performance for Synonym
Chart (2026)	Peak position
German Jazz Albums (Offizielle Top 100)	1
