= Cut & Rewind =

Studio album by Say She She
- Released: 3 October 2025
- Genre: Disco, funk, soul
- Length: 43:27
- Label: drink sum wtr

Say She She chronology
Silver (2023)	Cut & Rewind (2025)

Cut & Rewind is the third studio album by American disco/funk group Say She She, released on 3 October 2025 by the drink sum wtr label. The album is performed by singers Piya Malik, Nya Brown, and Sabrina Cunningham, with musical backing from members of Orgone. The album's title track was released as an advance single in June 2025.

== Background ==
The album was written during brief breaks in the touring and recording schedules for other artists for whom Malik, Brown, and Cunningham worked as session singers. According to the group, this gives the songs a sense of urgency. The album is inspired by public support that the group received from their idol Nile Rodgers, and advances their desire to form their own group identity beyond each member's previous session work. The song "Disco Life" addresses the 1979 Disco Demolition Night incident, though most of the album's other lyrics address modern political and class issues.

== Critical reception ==
The album received generally positive reviews. The New Yorker placed the album's music within the history of late-1970s disco while praising the lyrics for tackling the political issues of the 2020s. Far Out noted how the album finds unique ways to innovate within the disco genre as the three singers and the backing band "combine luscious vocal harmonies and light shimmers of a synthesiser [sic] with often angular bass and guitar lines."

Cathy Brown of No More Workhorse noted that Cut & Rewind advances the simpler retro sound of the group's two previous albums, and delivers "something sharper, more political, dense with sound and meaning," while highlighting the three singers' chemistry. The Firenote praised the expansion of the group's sound, combining disco with "the more atmospheric textures of 80s R&B, giving that blend a modern twist," while noting the feminist messages in the lyrics. Levitation magazine described the group's three singers as "soar[ing] above irresistible grooves, locking together in gorgeous three-part harmonies that cleverly disguise the feeling of righteous rebellion permeating their music."

== Track listing ==
No.	Title	Length
1.	"Cut & Rewind"	2:56
2.	"Under the Sun"	3:18
3.	"Disco Life"	3:32
4.	"Chapters"	3:13
5.	"Possibilities"	3:41
6.	"Take It All"	4:04
7.	"She Who Dares"	4:20
8.	"Shop Boy"	4:20
9.	"Bandit"	2:44
10.	"Little Kisses"	4:32
11.	"Do All Things with Love"	3:50
12.	"Make It Known"	3:06
Total length:		43:27
