= No More Water: The Gospel of James Baldwin =

Studio album by Meshell Ndegeocello
- Released: August 2, 2024
- Studios: Dreamland Recording Studios (Hurley, NY); Stella Sound (North Hollywood, CA)
- Length: 76:25
- Label: Blue Note
- Producers: Chris Bruce; Meshell Ndegeocello

Meshell Ndegeocello chronology
The Omnichord Real Book (2023)	No More Water: The Gospel of James Baldwin (2024)	Synonym (2026)

"Sadly, I didn't get his work until much later in life. Imagine if I had gotten this as a child. That's what we work on now, especially Paul Thompson, who's featured on the record. We try to have this taught in high school, to give some idea of the systematic racism that has been imposed on people of color since the beginning of this country. He's very prophetic in the sense that we're at a breaking point, and I think much like mental illness in the individual, if you build your house on a foundation of sand, it's bound to fall apart. I think that's what's happening in America. The delusion and the illusions are falling to the wayside. I'm just hoping we create something much better."

— Meshell Ndegeocello on discovering James Baldwin and his relevance to contemporary America

No More Water: The Gospel of James Baldwin is a 2024 studio album by American singer-songwriter Meshell Ndegeocello, released on August 2, 2024, by Blue Note Records. It is a tribute album to African-American thinkers and writers, including the titular namesake James Baldwin and Audre Lorde. The album was preceded by songs "Raise the Roof", "Thus Sayeth the Lorde", and "Travel". The album received a Grammy Award for Best Alternative Jazz Album.

== Background ==
In 2016, Ndegeocello created Can I Get a Witness?, a multimedia project for the Harlem Stage Gatehouse to celebrate the work of African-American writer and civil rights activist James Baldwin. Ndegeocello stated that Baldwin's writing, particularly his nonfiction book The Fire Next Time, developed her understanding of race and class struggle in American history.

She also credited Baldwin's work with deepening her understanding of what her parents went through. As a member of the U.S. military, her father was limited in which ranks he could reach due to racial discrimination in the armed forces, while her mother had a fourth-grade education. Ndegeocello commented that Baldwin's writing "just made me see them trying to raise a family, have a marriage, and be individuals in a society that’s been hard-wired for racism, bigotry, and classism." Her connection to Baldwin's work grew during the COVID-19 pandemic in the early 2020s, which ultimately resulted in her writing and recording No More Water. Baldwin ultimately received a writing credit on half the tracks on No More Water.

== Recording ==
To record No More Water, Ndegeocello collaborated with musicians including saxophonist Josh Johnson, who produced her previous album, The Omnichord Real Book. Other collaborators with whom Ndegeocello had previously worked included singer Justin Hicks, keyboardist Jebin Bruni, and her longtime drummer, Abe Rounds. The album also features new collaborators including singer Kenita-Miller Hicks, keyboardists Jake Sherman and Julius Rodriguez, and trumpet player Paul Thompson. Poet Staceyann Chin and critic Hilton Als perform spoken word on the album.

== Composition ==
The album is split into four parts, corresponding to the four sides of a vinyl double album. According to critic Dorian Lynskey, the first side incorporates elements of funk and gospel while introducing the listener to gospel.

The second side addresses issues of "judgment and physical threat", reaching a climax with the electric guitar performance on "Pride II", a reckoning of white-on-black violence. On this side, "Raise the Roof" features a spoken word performance by Chin, who discusses racism in America and says that "I am holding my own sorrow back from my own child, born black in a country in which her brown body does not matter to anyone with any power." Chin orders the listener to "scream, wail, march, meet, gather, plan, strategise". Ndegeocello stated that she wrote the next song, "The Price of the Ticket", to be a protest anthem that could be performed without instruments. Its sound was noted for its "soothing mellowness" in contrast with the "fury" of the preceding track. Regarding the title, she explained that "I've been at the barrel of a gun... The price of this ticket, of being in this skin, is real."

The third side consists of soul-pop, drawing comparison to the work of Michael Kiwanuka, while the fourth side "spreads out in surprising directions", with the ambient soul duet "Down at the Cross" earning comparison to the work of British indie pop group the xx. On "Tsunami Rising", Chin delivers a monologue on gender, touching on topics including the slave trade and the #MeToo movement, while Josh Johnson plays saxophone.

== Release ==
On May 31, 2024, Ndegeocello announced that her second album on Blue Note Records would be No More Water: The Gospel of James Baldwin, and that it would be released on August 2, 2024, the 100th anniversary of Baldwin's birth. Alongside the announcement, Ndegeocello released the first two singles, "Travel" and "Raise the Roof", as well as the album's complete track listing. On June 18, she performed on an episode of NPR's Tiny Desk Concert, singing two songs from the forthcoming album, "Travel" and "Love", as well as two of her earlier songs, "Virgo" and "Outside Your Door". AllMusic critic Andy Kellman regarded the album as concluding "an informal trilogy" of records paying tribute to past artists, starting with Ndegeocello's Pour Une Âme Souveraine (2012), which she dedicated to Nina Simone, and continuing with The Magic City (2024), a tribute to Sun Ra's 1966 album of the same name.

Following the album's release, Ndegeocello gave a series of live performances, including at The Ohio State University's Wexner Center for the Arts on September 22 and at Strathmore on October 5.

== Critical reception ==
Professional ratings
Aggregate scores
Source	Rating
Metacritic	84/100
Review scores
Source	Rating
Allmusic	4.5/5 stars
The Guardian	4/5 stars
Jazzwise	4/5 stars
The Observer	4/5 stars

Upon its release, No More Water received universal acclaim from music critics. On review aggregator Metacritic, the album holds a score of 84 out of 100, based on seven reviews.

Writing for The Guardian, Lynskey commented that Ndegeocello "has pulled off something extraordinary here", deeming the album a "shapeshifting dialogue with Baldwin’s life, work and legacy". Lynskey highlighted Chin's performances as cutting while concluding that the album's "more fluid, open songs" leave a lasting impression and align with Baldwin's "mercurial, uncontainable quality". In The Observer, critic Kitty Empire opined that the album "jolts and inspires in equal measure", calling it more ambitious than The Omnichord Real Book and noting Chin's performances as a highlight.

== Track listing ==
1. "Travel" – 4:09
2. "On the Mountain" – 5:59
3. "Baldwin Manifesto 1" – 0:43
4. "Raise the Roof" – 5:06
5. "The Price of the Ticket" – 1:34
6. "What Did I Do?" – 5:18
7. "Pride I" – 2:54
8. "Pride II" – 2:38
9. "Eyes" – 5:17
10. "Trouble" – 7:18
11. "Thus Sayeth the Lorde" – 5:40
12. "Love" – 3:42
13. "Hatred" – 5:28
14. "Tsunami Rising" – 8:04
15. "Another Country" – 4:47
16. "Baldwin Manifesto 2" – 2:06
17. "Down at the Cross" – 5:42

== Personnel ==
- Meshell Ndegeocello – bass guitar, vocals, production
- Hilton Als – spoken word
- Chris Bruce – guitar, production
- Jebin Bruni – keyboards
- Staceyann Chin – spoken word
- Justin Hicks – vocals
- Kenita-Miller Hicks – vocals
- Josh Johnson – saxophone
- Julius "Orange Julius" Rodriguez – keyboards
- Abe Rounds – drums
- Jake Sherman – keyboards
- Paul Thompson – trumpet

== Charts ==
Chart performance for No More Water: The Gospel of James Baldwin
Chart (2024)	Peak position
Swiss Albums (Schweizer Hitparade)	67
UK Album Downloads (Official Charts)	59

== See also ==
- 2024 in American music
- 2024 in rhythm and blues music
