= Bécane =

Single by Yamê

from the EP Elowi
- Released: 1 June 2023 (A Colors Show version); 13 June 2023 (single version)
- Length: 3:06
- Label: DBS; Naïve
- Songwriter: Emmanuel Sow
- Producers: Yamê; Pandrezz; KronoMuzik; Epektase

Yamê singles chronology
"Call of Valhalla" (2023)	"Bécane" (2023)

"Bécane" is a song by French Cameroonian singer Yamê. Released on 13 June 2023 by DBS Records and Naïve, it is the second single from his debut EP, Elowi. In 2023, with three producers, Yamê created "Bécane," where he wanted to mainly sing instead of rap. Yamê made a live performance of the song at the Colors Show on 1 June, which went viral on the internet and topped the Viral 50 chart on Spotify. The song was officially released on 13 June, discussing freedom and using a motorbike to represent freedom. "Bécane" received acclaim from numerous critics, who praised its melody and Yamê's singing. In January 2024, Yamê released a music video for "Bécane," which was directed by Mateo Da Silva.

== Background and release ==
During the COVID-19 pandemic, Yamê shared his music on TikTok. Through this, he released his first mixtape in September 2020, titled Bantu Mixtape Vol. 1 and later released Bantu Mixtape Vol. 2. He then released his first album, Agent 237, a year later. Yamê shifted to more piano and vocals instead of rap in 2022. In 2023, he created another album, dubbed Elowi. Pandrezz, KronoMuzik, and Epektase produced the album due to type beats no longer being possible to use, mainly using hip-hop and trap but also having the possibility of using acoustic sounds. Yamê, in an interview with OkayAfrica, said that he wrote "Bécane" without "thinking about the melody"; he was more focused on rapping, but after creating the lyrics, he found out he wanted to sing more than rap. Yamê also stated that the chorus was the easiest part to sing, adding that it was the "most fluid" and had also wanted to rap first before singing in the chorus.

After sharing the song in TikTok, he met a person working at "A Colors Show", leading to him traveling to Berlin to record the song. He released the song while being featured on the YouTube channel on 1 June 2023 with a minimalist video containing a single color and a microphone, according to Pan African Music. "Bécane" was released again on 13 June as a single and Elowi was released on 13 October; the song was released as a part of it.

== Music and lyrics ==
Yamê - Bécane
18-second sample of Bécane

"Bécane" is three minutes long and has been described as having influences of jazz, soul, and rap. The song discusses seeking freedom: Yamê said in an interview with OkayAfrica that, in Paris, it is "very crowded," causing people to use motorbikes to travel. He added that "you can travel at any time," stating, "For me, it’s the motorbike because I could go see my friends freely, go anywhere freely." Yamê then added that the song was generally about a tool that helps "seek freedom". While discussing freedom, Yamê also talks about the stress of computer work while stating that he would take "any risk" to get out of the job. According to Pan African Music, it also praises the "reliability" of German engines while opposing businesses based on rules. "On my bike, I head straight toward the horizon" (Note: Translated from French.) expresses a desire for freedom, according to Melo, while "Alone on the road, I face myself" talks about a "yearning" for escape.

== Critical reception ==
According to Générations, Yamê made the public "fall under his spell" with his writing, a "hypnotizing" voice, and a production between rap, jazz, and soul. Clémence Depresle of Le Petit Bulletin reported a soft instrumental accompanied by a "honeyed voice" that easily changes pitch. Depresle added that Yamê "waits for the bass" before giving a more "assertive voice," showing that his influences are accompanied by more "expressive" gestures. Depresle noted that the artist's look during the "A Colors Show" performance was "hard to categorize" with an oversized T-shirt and a fringed jacket with a feather-like effect. Ségo Raffaitin of Radio Nova said that the chorus could easily stick in your mind and that the song is "undeniably" one of the bangers of 2023. Raffaitin added that the song had a nice melody while mentioning its music video. He said that the song made you want to "hit the road" and "devour the asphalt," adding that his high-pitched and raw voice without autotune was a rarity. Guillaume Dubigny of Melo described Yamê's voice as singular while spanning several octaves with "distinctive phrasing amplified by astonishing pitch jumps".

== Music video ==
=== Development ===
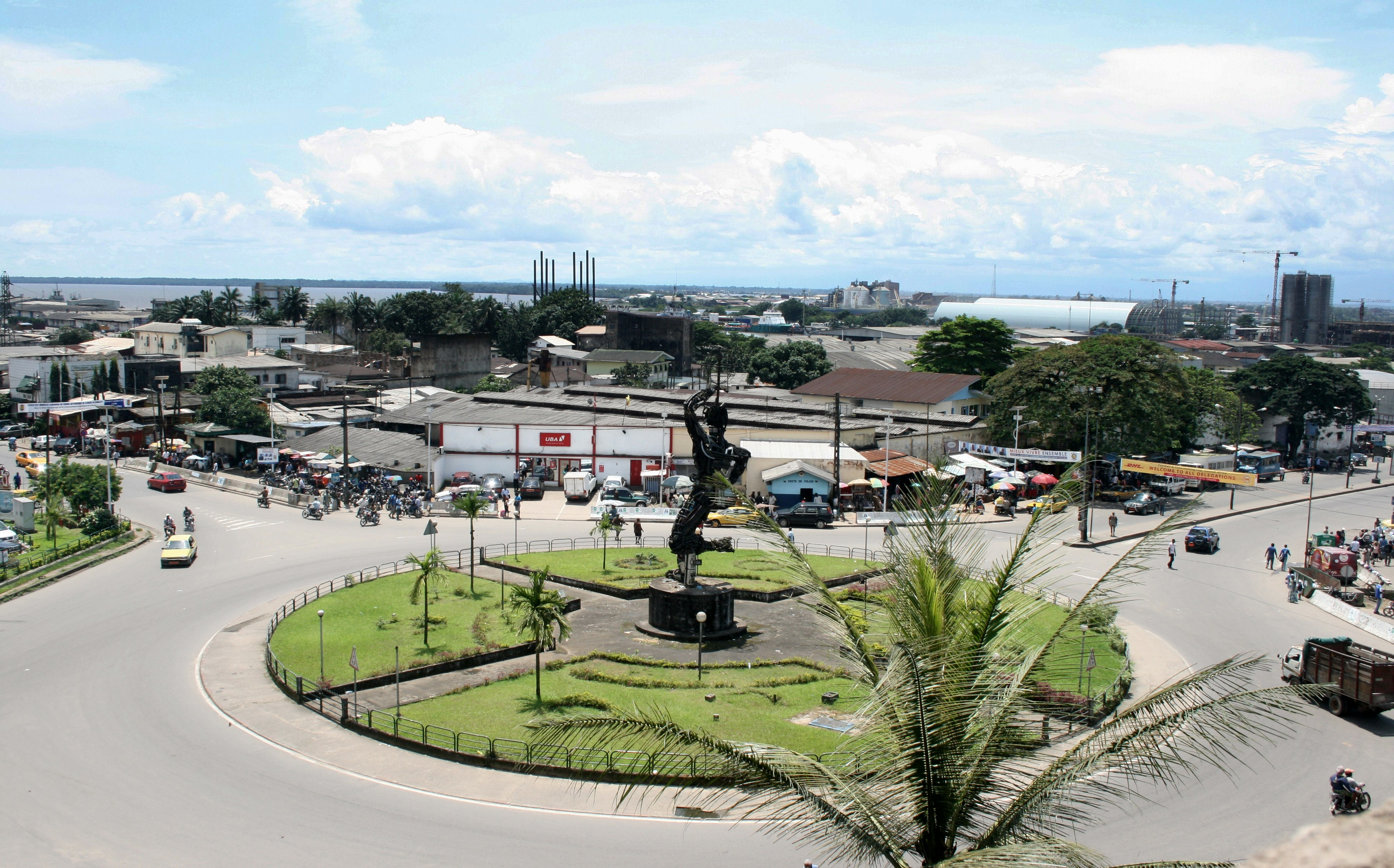
The music video was shot in Douala, Cameroon.

The music video for Bécane was directed by Mateo De Silva and was released in January 2024. Although Yamê was born in France, he decided to record the video in Cameroon due to the country being his parents' hometown, along with his desire to include motorbikes in the video. He stated, "I felt I had to go back and shoot my first successful video in my family’s hometown. Even if I didn’t have much time, it was really cool." He added that he met a "really good" production team that could shoot in Cameroon, stating in an interview that shooting in Africa is not "always easy." Yamê described everything as "different" in Africa. After finishing the video, Yamê thanked the city of Douala, the leader of the motorbike union, and others in an Instagram post.

=== Synopsis ===
The beginning of the music video shows Yamê paying tribute to benskinneurs, or motorbike taxi drivers. At a repair shop, Yamê fixes the lower part of a motorbike during the first verse while arguing with another person. Yamê storms off when the pre-chorus starts. He walks to his motorbike, sits on it, and puts on his coat. Then, a group of bikers chase him around his home in Douala in the first chorus. In the bridge, Yamê arrives at a shipping container yard. He walks inside the yard and joins a group of people in a hideout. In the final chorus, Yamê interacts with the group and rides with them. The final scenes show him walking along the container yard and interacting with the group.

== Viral success and live performance ==
"Bécane", according to Dubigny, had once entered Spotify's world viral Top 50 ranking with many shares in TikTok, contributing to the song's popularity. As the song went viral, the performance on "A Colors Show" was one of the highest viewed in the channel, topping Doja Cat and Gunna. Le Petit Bulletin acknowledged the performance as the most-viewed French language video in the channel. As a result of its virality, the song was a part of a TikTok trend. On 26 January 2024, Générations reported that the song had 35.8 million views in its "A Colors Show" performance. In June 2024, OkayAfrica reported that the performance had 70 million views in YouTube. Currently, the song has 68 million streams. As of late 2023, the hastag #Yame on TikTok has 337 million views. Pan African Music reported that Yamê had 900,000 followers on TikTok as of February 2024. After the song went viral, Timbaland reacted to the song and posted a remake of the it a few days later. In 2024, the song was also remade by Trinix, a French electronic music group. At the Victoires de la Musique, Yamê won Male Revelation of the Year. Yamê performed the song, along with the rest of the songs in Elowi, at the 2024 Les Francos de Montréal; according to magazine Atuvu, he "set the room on fire" while singing the song.

== Credits and personnel ==
Credits are adapted from Apple Music (Malaysia).

- Yamê - vocals, songwriting
- Epektase - composing
- Pandrezz - composing

== Charts ==
Chart performance for "Bécane"
Chart (2023–2024)	Peak position
Belgium (Ultratop 50 Wallonia)	11
Canada Hot 100 (Canadian Hot 100)	94
France (SNEP)	5
Luxembourg (Billboard)	10
Portugal (AFP)	58
Switzerland (Schweizer Hitparade)	27
Turkey (Radiomonitor Türkiye)	6

== Certifications ==
Region	Certification	Certified units/sales
France (SNEP)	Diamond	333,333^{‡}
^{‡} Sales+streaming figures based on certification alone.
