= The Omnichord Real Book =

Studio album by Meshell Ndegeocello
- Released: June 2, 2023
- Studios: Applehead Studio, Saugerties; GB's Juke Joint, Long Island City
- Genres: Jazz; R&B
- Length: 72:25
- Languages: English, Xhosa
- Label: Blue Note
- Producer: Josh Johnson

Meshell Ndegeocello chronology
Ventriloquism (2018)	The Omnichord Real Book (2023)	No More Water: The Gospel of James Baldwin (2024)

The Omnichord Real Book is a 2023 studio album by American musician Meshell Ndegeocello. It was met with acclaim from critics and became the first recipient of the newly created Grammy Award for Best Alternative Jazz Album, at the 66th Annual Grammy Awards.

== Reception ==
Professional ratings
Aggregate scores
Source	Rating
Metacritic	81/100
Review scores
Source	Rating
AllMusic	4.5/5 stars
The Arts Desk	4/5 stars
Exclaim!	8/10
The Guardian	4/5 stars
Musikexpress	5/6 stars
Pitchfork	7.8/10
PopMatters	8/10
Uncut	3/5 stars

According to the review aggregator Metacritic, The Omnichord Real Book received "universal acclaim" based on a weighted average score of 81 out of 100 from eight critic scores. Editors at AllMusic rated this album 4.5 out of 5 stars, with critic Andy Kellman writing that the album has "a plenitude of supple rhythmic and ruminative vocal interplay". Peter Quinn of The Arts Desk gives it 4 out of 5 stars, spotlighting several key tracks and calling this release "a treasure trove of musical memories". At Exclaim!, Antoine-Samuel Mauffette Alavo gave this album an 8 out of 10, stating that Ndegeocello allows her collaborators to shine and that this release is "a very solid start to [her] tenure at Blue Note". In Glide Magazine, Jim Hynes writes that "there's so much to digest here that we may hear it a bit differently each time it plays". Louder Than War's Gordon Rutherford scored The Omnichord Real Book 4.5 out of 5 for "a host of outstanding collaborators" and music that is "indubitably special" and "defies classification" that displays Ndegeocello's "absolute virtuosity".

Writing for NPR, Nate Chinen calls this an "expansive yet interior new album" that explores "realness". That outlet also highlighted this album as one of the five best releases of the week for All Songs Considered. Writing for Pitchfork, Matthew Ismael Ruiz rated this album a 7.8 out of 10, calling it "a natural synthesis of the jazz, rock, dub, and soul" that is consistent with Ndegeocello's sound. An 8 out of 10 came from Matthew Ruiz of PopMatters who called this music "stellar soul", which he compares to several styles but calls singularly Ndegeocello's own.

Editors at NPR Music chose this among the 50 best albums of 2023 and further distinguished it for praise with a crown signifying that it was recommended "to anyone looking for a spark, or a slow burn". Carl Wilson at NPR Music chose this to be among the 50 best albums of 2023. This album was included in a list of 24 runners-up for the best albums of 2023 in Slate. Editors at AllMusic included this on their list of the best albums of 2023 and among their favorite R&B albums of 2023. Editors at online retailer Qobuz included this on their list of the best jazz albums of 2023.

At the 66th Annual Grammy Awards in 2024, The Omnichord Real Book won the inaugural Grammy Award for Best Alternative Jazz Album. It marked Ndegeocello's first Grammy for a solo work, and her second overall, following the 2021 Grammy Award for Best R&B Song that Robert Glasper, H.E.R., and she shared for "Better than I Imagined".

== Track listing ==
1. "Georgia Ave" – 2:40
2. "An Invitation" – 2:21
3. "Call the Tune" – 1:54
4. "Good Good" – 3:28
5. "Omnipuss" – 2:51
6. "Clear Water" – 4:35
7. "ASR" – 7:38
8. "Gatsby" – 4:21
9. "Towers" – 3:35
10. "Perceptions" – 2:14
11. "Tha King" – 0:27
12. "Virgo" – 8:39
13. "Burn Progression" – 4:02
14. "Oneelevensixteen" – 2:50
15. "Vuma" – 3:01
16. "The 5th Dimension" – 5:25
17. "Hole in the Bucket" – 5:30
18. "Virgo 3" – 6:53

== Personnel ==
- Meshell Ndegeocello – instrumentation, vocals, liner notes
- Ambrose Akinmusire – "Burn Progression"
- Hanna Benn – "Burn Progression"
- Sanford Biggers – "Clear Water"
- Mark Guiliana – "Virgo 3"
- The HawtPlates – "The 5th Dimension" and "Hole in the Bucket"
- Cory Henry – "Gatsby"
- Jade Hicks – Good Good
- Joan As Police Woman – "Gatsby"
- Josh Johnson – "Georgia Ave", "Good Good", and "Virgo 3"
- Thandiswa Mazwai – vocals in Xhosa on "THA KING" and "Vuma"
- Jason Moran – "Perceptions"
- Deantoni Parks – "Clear Water" and "Virgo"
- Jeff Parker – "Clear Water" and "ASR"
- Julius Rodriguez – "Virgo"
- Joel Ross – "Towers" and "Vuma"
- Brandee Younger – "Virgo" and "Virgo 3"

== See also ==
- 2023 in American music
- 2023 in jazz
- 2023 in rhythm and blues
- List of 2023 albums
