= Manu Manzo =

American singer-songwriter (born 1994)

- Born: 14 April 1994 (age 32); Caracas, Venezuela
- Occupation: Singer-songwriter
- Education: Berklee College of Music

Manu Manzo (born in Caracas, 14 April 1994) is an American singer-songwriter who was born in Venezuela and raised in Miami, Florida.

== Career ==
After attending the Berklee College of Music for two years, she released her first six-track EP titled Como Soy in 2014, produced by Juan Carlos Perez-Soto. She collaborated on the composition with Tommy Torres, Luis Enrique, Alex Ubago, Elsten Torres, Cris Zalles, and Perez-Soto.

Manzo was nominated for Best New Artist at the 2015 Latin Grammy Awards.

Manzo signed a publishing deal with Peermusic in 2016.

In 2018, she signed a recording contract and co-management with Universal Music Latin Entertainment.
