= Forest Claudette =

Australian singer and songwriter

- Born: Kobe Hamilton-Reeves; Melbourne, Australia
- Occupations: Singer; songwriter; musician
- Years active: 2017–present
- Labels: Forest Claudette, Sony
- Website: forestclaudette.com

Kobe Hamilton-Reeves, (known professionally as Forest Claudette) is an Australian singer and songwriter.

== Early life ==
Kobe Hamilton-Reeves was born in Melbourne, Australia whose parents are classically trained. Their older brother Zach is the vocalist in Northeast Party House.

== Career ==
=== 2017-present ===
In 2017, Hamilton-Reeves went by the alias Teddy Elk, and released "Doors" which received airplay on Triple J Unearthed.

In 2020, Hamilton-Reeves changed the stage name to Forest Claudette, telling Triple J, "I felt a great pressure and a weight I was putting on myself to have my music mean more, and capture the nuances of the black experience which is really, really hard to do on a day-to-day basis." Hamilton-Reeves said Claudette is a homage to Claudette Colvin while Forest references they grew up in a forest.

In July 2022, Forest Claudette released the single "Creaming Soda", which was followed by "Gone Without a Trace" and "Hologram".

In September 2022 Forest Claudette released their debut EP, The Year of February. It was released on vinyl in April 2023 as part of a Record Store Day exclusive.

In June 2023, Forest Claudette released their second EP Everything Was Green. The EP was preceded by lead single "Mess Around" featuring EarthGang.

In January 2024, Forest Claudette released a cover of Red Hot Chili Peppers' "Can't Stop".

In March 2024, Forest Claudette announced the forthcoming release of their third EP, Jupiter.

On 23 August 2024, Forest Claudette released the 3-track & Stone Between EP.

== Personal life ==
Claudette is non-binary.

== Discography ==
=== Extended plays ===
List of EPs, with selected details
Title	Details
The Year of February	Released: 30 September 2022; Format: digital, LP; Label: Forest Claudette, Sony (196587920111)
Everything Was Green	Released: 16 June 2023; Format: digital, LP; Label: Forest Claudette, Sony (19658822651)
Jupiter	Released: 3 May 2024; Format: digital; Label: Forest Claudette, Sony
& Stone Between	Released: 23 August 2024; Format: digital; Label: Forest Claudette, Sony

== Awards and nominations ==
=== APRA Awards ===
The APRA Awards are held in Australia and New Zealand by the Australasian Performing Right Association to recognise songwriting skills, sales and airplay performance by its members annually.

Year	Nominee / work	Award	Result	Ref.
2024	"Goodbye" by Forest Claudette (Kobe Hamilton-Reeves, Alexander Laska)	Most Performed R&B / Soul Work	Nominated	
2025	"Kobe Beef" by Forest Claudette (Kobe Hamilton-Reeves, Alexander Tirheimer)	Most Performed R&B / Soul Work	Nominated	

=== ARIA Music Awards ===
The ARIA Music Awards is an annual award ceremony event celebrating the Australian music industry. At the 2023 ceremony they won two categories.

Year	Nominee / work	Award	Result	Ref.
2023	"Mess Around" (featuring Earthgang)	Best Soul/R&B Release	Won	
2023	Jeremy Koren (Grey Ghost) for Forest Claudette – Everything Was Green	Best Cover Art	Won	
2024	Jupiter	Best Soul/R&B Release	Nominated	

=== Music Victoria Awards ===
The Music Victoria Awards are an annual awards night celebrating Victorian music. They commenced in 2006.

Year	Nominee / work	Award	Result	Ref.
2023	"Mess Around" (featuring EarthGang)	Best Song or Track	Nominated	
2023	Forest Claudette	Best Solo Artist	Nominated	
2023	Forest Claudette	Soul, Funk, RNB & Gospel Work	Nominated	

=== Rolling Stone Australia Awards ===
The Rolling Stone Australia Awards are awarded annually in January or February by the Australian edition of Rolling Stone magazine for outstanding contributions to popular culture in the previous year.

Year	Nominee / work	Award	Result	Ref.
2023	Forest Claudette	Best New Artist	Nominated	
