= Black Bayou (album) =

Studio album by Robert Finley
- Released: October 27, 2023
- Studio: Easy Eye (Nashville, Tennessee)
- Genre: Blues; soul
- Length: 40:21
- Language: English
- Label: Easy Eye Sound
- Producer: Dan Auerbach

Robert Finley chronology
Sharecropper's Son (2021)	Black Bayou (2023)

Singles from Black Bayou
- 1. "What Goes Around (Comes Around)" Released: June 29, 2023; 2. "Sneakin' Around" Released: August 3, 2023

"It doesn't matter what kind of voice you have. If you're not saying nothing to make sense, it's not doing any good... What comes from the heart goes to the heart."

—Robert Finley on the importance of authenticity in his songwriting.

Black Bayou is the fourth full-length studio album from American blues musician Robert Finley, released in 2023. It has received positive reviews from critics and builds upon his earlier style to incorporate soul music.

== Background ==
On June 29, 2023, Finley announced the release of his fourth studio album, along with the single "What Goes Around (Comes Around)". The album was recorded at producer Dan Auerbach's Easy Eye Sound.

The second single "Sneakin' Around", with a music video directed by Andy M Hawkes, was released on August 3, 2023.

== Tour ==
In support of the album, Finley announced a tour, starting on November 3, 2023, at the Kammgarn music venue in Kaiserslautern, Germany with the support of German blues musician Kai Strauss, and finishing at Le Fil in Saint-Etienne, France.

== Reception ==
According to the review aggregator Metacritic, Black Bayou received "universal acclaim" based on a weighted average score of 89 out of 100 from six critic scores. Writing for American Songwriter, Hal Horowitz scored this release 4 out 5 stars, stating that compared to Finley's previous work, "there's a crispness created by this less structured environment that is natural, earthy, and spontaneous". Glide Magazine's Jim Hynes suggested that this album could help Finley break into the mainstream. Mojo published David Hutcheon's five-star review that calls this "a slow cruise through a landscape populated by Flannery O'Connor scenarios and escapees from the untamed ecosystems of Tom Waits's imagination" and Southern Gothic soul music. Jim Shahen of No Depression considers this work an expansion of Finley's sound that includes doo-wop ballads and swampy grooves. In Spill Magazine, this was an Editor's Pick and critic Ljubinko Zivkovic scored it a 9 out of 10, comparing the music to the heydays of Stax Records, writing that it is "as if Albert King with Booker T. & The MG's are back at it again, but this time around Robert Finley does that sound some excellent justice, and life is all good again". Johnny Sharp of Uncut stated that on this release, Finley's lyrics have expanded beyond his personal experience and Finley has grown into a more mature storyteller.

Mojo ranked this the 75th best album of 2023. Uncut editor Michael Bonner included this album on his list of the best of the year. Editors at Spin included this among the albums of the year.

== Track listing ==
1. "Livin' Out a Suitcase" (Dan Auerbach, Kenny Brown, Patrick Carney, Eric Deaton, and Robert Finley) – 3:09
2. "Sneakin' Around" (Auerbach, Brown, Carney, Deaton, and Finley) – 3:41
3. "Miss Kitty" (Auerbach, Brown, Jeffrey Clemens, Deaton, and Finley) – 3:59
4. "Waste of Time" (Auerbach, Brown, Clemens, Deaton, and Finley) – 3:35
5. "Can't Blame Me for Trying" (Auerbach, Brown, Carney, Deaton, and Finley) – 3:30
6. "Gospel Blues" (Auerbach, Brown, Clemens, Deaton, and Finley) – 2:49
7. "Nobody Wants to Be Lonely" (Auerbach, Brown, Clemens, Deaton, and Finley) – 3:14
8. "What Goes Around (Comes Around)" (Auerbach, Brown, Carney, Deaton, and Finley) – 3:37
9. "Lucky Day" (Auerbach, Brown, Clemens, Deaton, and Finley) – 3:24
10. "You Got It (And I Need It)" (Auerbach, Brown, Clemens, Deaton, and Finley) – 3:20
11. "Alligator Bait" (Auerbach, Brown, Clemens, Deaton, and Finley) – 6:10

== Personnel ==
- Robert Finley – guitar, vocals
- Dan Auerbach – guitar, percussion, handclaps, mixing, production
- Sam Bacco – percussion
- Kenny Brown – guitar
- Patrick Carney – drums on "Livin' Out a Suitcase", "Sneakin' Around", "Can't Blame Me for Trying", and "What Goes Around (Comes Around)"
- Jeffrey Clemens – drums on "Miss Kitty", "Waste of Time", "Gospel Blues", "Nobody Wants to Be Lonely", "Lucky Day", "You Got It (And I Need It)", and "Alligator Bait"
- Eric Deaton – bass guitar
- Jim Herrington – photography
- Ray Jacildo – organ on "Livin' Out a Suitcase", "Miss Kitty", "Nobody Wants to Be Lonely", and "What Goes Around (Comes Around)"; Wurlitzer organ on "Livin' Out a Suitcase"; and piano on "Miss Kitty", and "Nobody Wants to Be Lonely"
- McKinley James – engineering assistance
- Christy Johnson – backing vocals on "Miss Kitty", "Nobody Wants to Be Lonely", and "What Goes Around (Comes Around)"
- LaQuindrelyn McMahon – backing vocals on "Miss Kitty", "Nobody Wants to Be Lonely", and "What Goes Around (Comes Around)"
- M. Allen Parker – recording, engineering, mixing
- Tim Quine – harp on "Livin' Out a Suitcase", "Sneakin' Around", "Waste of Time", "Gospel Blues", "What Goes Around (Comes Around)", and "Lucky Day"
- Perry Shall – design, layout
- Ryan Smith – mastering at Sterling Sound Nashville, Tennessee, United States
- Jonny Ullman – engineering assistance
- Caleb VanBuskirk – additional engineering
- Tyler Zwiep – engineering assistance

== Charts ==
Chart performance for Black Bayou
Chart (2023)	Peak position
French Albums (SNEP)	196
Swiss Albums (Schweizer Hitparade)	98
UK Americana Albums (OCC)	17
UK Jazz & Blues Albums (OCC)	4
US Top Blues Albums (Billboard)	2

== See also ==
- 2023 in American music
- List of 2023 albums
