= Elowi =

EP by Yamê
- Released: 13 October 2023
- Genre: Hip hop; jazz; lo-fi; soul
- Length: 26:13
- Label: DBS; Naïve
- Producer: BigDrum; Epektase; KronoMuzik; Own; Pandrezz; Princess; Samoss; Thomas Broussard; Yamê; Zen0

Yamê chronology
| Agent 237 (2021) | Elowi (2023) |

Singles from Elowi
- 1. "Call of Valhalla" Released: 27 January 2023; 2. "Bécane" Released: 13 June 2023

Elowi (stylised in all caps) is the debut EP by French-Cameroonian singer and rapper Yamê. It was released on 13 October 2023 by DBS Records and Naïve. Elowi is a main jazz, lo-fi and soul record with elements of french hip hop and trap music.

== Background and release ==
In November 2022, Yamê created his TikTok account and began posting videos where he sings songs of around 30 seconds that he wrote and composed, or covers ("La bohème" by Charles Aznavour, "Tous les mêmes" by Stromae and "Feeling Good" by Nina Simone). In the comments, many people were asking him to release his songs, so on 27 January 2023 Yamê released "Call of Valhalla". In February the same year he was invited by Stromae to open for his concerts. He also performed at the Colors Show his song "Bécane" which went viral on social networks. On 5 October 2023 Yamê announced the release of his debut EP Elowi.

== Track listing ==
All the tracks are written by Emmanuel Sow.

Elowi track listing
| No. | Title | Producer(s) | Length |
|---|---|---|---|
| 1. | "Ayo Mba" | Yamê; Pandrezz | 3:28 |
| 2. | "Mon bail" | Yamê; Pandrezz | 1:13 |
| 3. | "Call of Valhalla" | Yamê; Pandrezz; KronoMuzik | 3:07 |
| 4. | "Lowkey" | Samoss; Thomas Broussard | 3:32 |
| 5. | "Bahwai" | Yamê; Pandrezz | 2:37 |
| 6. | "Déter" | Princess | 3:12 |
| 7. | "Bécane" | Yamê; Pandrezz; KronoMuzik; Epektase | 3:07 |
| 8. | "Business" | Yamê; Pandrezz; Epektase; Zen0; Own | 3:12 |
| 9. | "Quête" | Yamê; Pandrezz; Epektase; BigDrum | 2:53 |
| Total length: | | | 26:13 |

== Charts ==
Chart performance for Elowi
| Chart (2023) | Peak position |
|---|---|
| Belgian Albums (Ultratop Wallonia) | 38 |
| French Albums (SNEP) | 10 |

== Release history ==
Release history for Elowi
| Region | Release date | Format | Label |
|---|---|---|---|
| France | 13 October 2023 | Digital download; CD | DBS; Naïve |
