= Everything Was Green =

EP by Forest Claudette
- Released: 16 June 2023
- Length: 19:37
- Label: Forest Claudette; Sony

Forest Claudette chronology
The Year of February (2022)	Everything Was Green (2023)

Singles from Everything Was Green
- 1. "Mess Around" Released: 24 March 2023; 2. "Motor in the Sand" Released: 21 April 2023; 3. "Two Years" Released: 19 May 2023; 4. "Violence" Released: 14 July 2023

Everything Was Green is the second extended play by Australian alt-R&B singer Forest Claudette. It was announced on 19 May 2023, alongside its third single and was released on 16 June 2023.

In an interview with 10 Magazine, Claudette said "My intention with Everything Was Green was simply to share my personal cycle of observation. My favourite part of releasing music so far has been the realisation that folks will interpret each song in their own way, and although the meaning behind my words are as specific as I can be to my experience, they can also be interpreted in so many ways and speak to people through their own lens."

At the ARIA Music Awards of 2023, the Jeremy Koren (Grey Ghost) and Michelle Grace Hunder designed cover won the ARIA Award for Best Cover Art.

== Reception ==
Veniana Vucago from Acclaim Magazine said "Everything Was Green lends lush, spine-tingling walls of synths accompanied by melodic falsettos. The R&B up-and-comer showcases his lyrical talent, skillfully intertwining personal experiences and emotions that bleed onto each track."

Ayodeji Ibrahim Lateef from Yours Truly called the EP "a mesmerizing blend of soul, hip-hop, and pop that showcases their musical versatility and creative prowess.".

Sydney Scott from Music Daily said "This six song EP takes listeners on a deeply introspective personal journey through Forest Claudette's experiences and emotions. Everything Was Green couples an exploration and examination of self alongside groovy melodies and thought provoking lyrics."

== Track listing ==
No.	Title	Writer(s)	Producer(s)	Length
1.	"Two Years"	Kobe Hamilton-Reeves; Jason Hahs; Gabe Reali	Jason Hahs	2:43
2.	"Mess Around" (featuring Earthgang)	Hamilton-Reeves; Paul Meany; Olu O. Fann; Eian Undrai Parker	Paul Meany	3:50
3.	"Motor in the Sand"	Hamilton-Reeves; Pip Norman	Pip Norman	3:07
4.	"Hi Vis Teeth"	Hamilton-Reeves; Cass Lowe	Cass Lowe	2:46
5.	"Pool Boy"	Hamilton-Reeves; Alex Tirheimer	Alex Tirheimer	2:53
6.	"Violence"	Hamilton-Reeves; Tyler Accord	Lophile	4:15
Total length:				19:37
