= Silver (Say She She album) =

Studio album by Say She She
- Released: September 29, 2023
- Length: 65:54
- Label: Karma Chief

Say She She chronology
Prism (2022)	Silver (2023)	Cut & Rewind (2025)

Silver is the second studio album by American band Say She She. It was released on September 29, 2023, by Karma Chief Records.

== Critical reception ==
Professional ratings
Aggregate scores
Source	Rating
Metacritic	81/100
Review scores
Source	Rating
AllMusic	4/5 stars
Clash	7/10
God Is in the TV	9/10
The Line of Best Fit	8/10

Silver was met with "universal acclaim" reviews from critics. At Metacritic, which assigns a weighted average rating out of 100 to reviews from mainstream publications, this release received an average score of 81, based on 5 reviews.

Jane Oinonen of The Line of Best Fit gave the album an eight out of ten, noting the release as a "celebratory demonstration of real musical imagination and scope, echoing such past notables as Liquid Liquid, ESG and Tom Tom Club in how oft-visited strands of rhythm-forward music – rooted in funk, soul and disco."

The album reached number 61 in Scotland on the Official Charts Company.

== Accolades ==
Publications' year-end list appearances for Silver
Critic/Publication	List	Rank	Ref
Far Out	Far Out's Top 50 Albums of 2023	37	
God Is in the TV	God Is in the TV's Top 100 Albums of 2023	8	
KCRW	KCRW's Top 23 Albums of 2023	1	
MusicOMH	MusicOMH's Top 50 Albums of 2023	36	
Piccadilly Records	Piccadilly Records' Top 100 Albums of 2023	26	
WXPN	WXPN's Top Albums of 2023	7	

== Track listing ==
Silver track listing
No.	Title	Length
1.	"Reeling"	3:40
2.	"Don't You Dare Stop"	4:30
3.	"Astral Plane"	4:41
4.	"C'est Si Bon"	3:56
5.	"Entry Level"	3:16
6.	"Passing Time"	3:27
7.	"Think About It"	2:52
8.	"Questions"	3:59
9.	"Forget Me Not"	3:56
10.	"Never Say Never"	4:26
11.	"The Water"	3:19
12.	"Echo in the Chamber"	3:20
13.	"Bleeding Heart"	4:12
14.	"Find a Way"	3:26
15.	"Norma"	3:55
16.	"Silver"	8:59
Total length:		65:54

== Charts ==
Chart performance for Silver
Chart (2023)	Peak position
Scottish Albums (OCC)	61
