= Yamê =

French-Cameroonian singer and songwriter (born 1993)

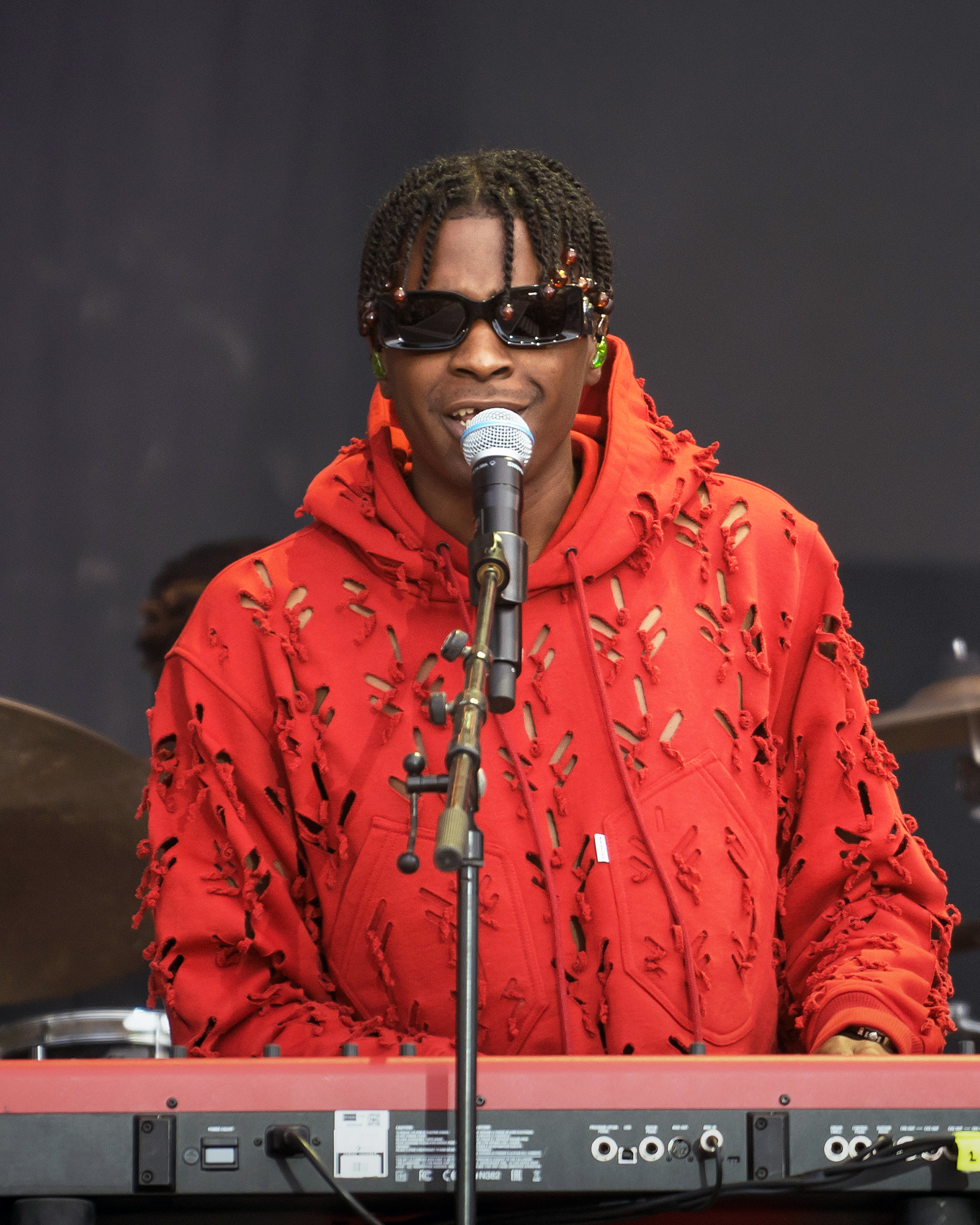
- Sow in 2024
- Born: Emmanuel Sow; 19 April 1993 (age 33); Cergy-Pontoise, France
- Citizenship: French; Cameroonian
- Occupations: Singer; rapper; songwriter
- Years active: 2020–present
- Musical career
- Genres: R&B; hip-hop; jazz; soul
- Instruments: Vocals; keyboards; synthesizers
- Label: Naïve

Emmanuel Sow (born 19 April 1993), known professionally as Yamê, is a French-born Cameroonian singer, rapper and songwriter. He is known for his single "Bécane" which reached No. 10 on Billboard's Luxembourg Songs chart, number 9 on the French Singles Chart and at number 11 on the Belgian Ultratop Wallonia Chart.

== Early life ==
Emmanuel Sow was born on 19 April 1993 in Cergy-Pontoise, France, to a Senegalese-Cameroonian father. His stage name "Yamê" is from a language in Mbo which means "The Verb". Yamê had access to several instruments in the home music studio from an early age. Emmanuel Sow used to engage himself with his father's music, a Senegalese-Cameroonian musician known as M'backé Ngoup'Emanty, without researching the theory.

== Career ==
In 2020, Yamê released a mixtape titled Bantu Mixtape Vol. 1 following an extended play titled Agent 237 in 2021. On 1 June 2023 The Colors Studios called Yamê to perform his song “Bécane” and promote his debut album Elowi. The singer is also recognised for his missing teeth. Due to the attention, American producer, Timbaland composed an instrumental on Yamê's song "Quête". In January 2024, Yamê released a music video for "Bécane" which was directed by Mateo Da Silva. In February 2024, Yamê won Best Male Newcomer at the Victoires de la Musique awards.

Yamê's song "Bécane" went viral on social media after his performance on Colors Show. The song also charted No. 12 on Billboard's France Songs, No. 94 on Canadian Hot 100, No. 199 on Billboard Global 200 and many more.

== Discography ==
=== Studio albums ===
List of studio albums with selected details
Title	Details	Peak chart positions
Title	Details	BEL (WA)
Agent 237	Released: 6 June 2021; Label: DBS; Formats: Digital download	—
Ébêm	Released: 13 June 2025; Label: DBS, Naïve; Formats: CD, digital download	70

=== EPs ===
List of studio albums, with selected chart positions and certifications
Title	Peak chart positions		Album details
Title	FRA	BEL (WA)	Album details
Elowi	10	38	Released: 13 October 2023; Label: DBS, Naïve; Formats: CD, Digital download

=== Mixtapes ===
List of mixtapes with selected details
Title	Details
Bantu Mixtape Vol. 1	Released: 5 September 2020; Label: Self-released; Formats: Digital download
Bantu Mixtape Vol. 2	Released: 26 December 2020; Label: Self-released; Formats: Digital download

=== Singles ===
Single	Year	Peak chart positions			Album
Single	Year	FRA	BEL (WA)	SWI	Album
"Mouf"	2020	—	—	—	Non-album singles
"Gimme a Ride"	2021	—	—	—	Non-album singles
"Carré d'as"	2021	—	—	—	Agent 237
"B.4.6"	2021	—	—	—	Non-album singles
"BB Démarre"	2021	—	—	—	Non-album singles
"Kodjo"	2022	—	—	—	Non-album singles
"Call of Valhalla"	2023	—	—	—	Elowi
"Bécane"	2023	9	11	27	Elowi
"Bahwai"	2023	—	—	—	Elowi
"Shoot"	2025	—	—	—	Ébêm
"Insensé"	2025	—	—	—	Ébêm
"Solo"	2025	—	—	—	Ébêm

== Awards and nominations ==
Year	Award	Categories	Result	Ref.
2024	Victoires de la Musique	Best Male Newcomer	Won	
2026	Berlin Music Video Awards	Best VFX for "Shoot"	Nominated	
