= Santhosam =

Studio album by Priya Ragu
- Released: 20 October 2023
- Length: 40:15
- Label: Warner
- Producer: Japhna Gold

Priya Ragu chronology
damnshestamil (2021)	Santhosam (2023)

Singles from Santhosam
- 1. "Adalam Va!" Released: 5 October 2022; 2. "Easy" Released: 4 July 2023; 3. "Vacation" Released: 16 August 2023; 4. "Black Goose" Released: 2 October 2023; 5. "One Way Ticket" Released: 18 October 2023

Santhosam is the debut studio album by Swiss-Tamil singer-songwriter Priya Ragu. It was released on 20 October 2023 through Warner.

== Background ==
Santhosam was named after the Tamil word for "Happiness". Ragu recorded the album with her brother and producer Japhna Gold. It tells Ragu's "story of finding happiness" that helped her find her own "purpose in life" and hoped it would help others as well. Ragu sought out artist Manuja Waldia to paint the artwork and explained that it is supposed to reflect her heritage Jaffna, Sri Lanka as well as her home Switzerland in the form of mountains. She announced the project on 16 August 2023, accompanied by the release of the second single "Vacation". The song finds her taking a break from the tour life and allows herself to "recharge [her] batteries". Ahead of the announcement, the singer-songwriter released the songs "Easy" on 4 July and "Adalam Va!" on 5 October 2022.

== Critical reception ==
Professional ratings
Aggregate scores
Source	Rating
Metacritic	79/100
Review scores
Source	Rating
DIY	4/5 stars
Line of Best Fit	8/10
NME	4/5 stars
Pitchfork	7.0/10
The Skinny	4/5 stars

Santhosam received a score of 79 out of 100 on review aggregator Metacritic based on five critics' reviews, indicating "generally favorable". Ed Lawson of DIY wondered why the album did not come out in the early Summer, as it is so "sonically buoyant". Lawson found that the record lives up to its title "happiness". Sam Franzini of Line of Best Fit argued that the magic of her debut mixtape damnshestamil has not "yet vanished". Franzini called the outcome as the release of "an artist's overflowing creativity".

NME writer Kayleigh Watson saw the album as a recording of "hope for society and oneself" and an invitation to listeners to "join [Ragu] on a spiritual quest to be free". Anita Bhadani of The Skinny called Santhosam a "testament to finding your own joy and inner contentment" and opined that Ragu had "fully arrived", building a "distinctive space of her own".

== Track listing ==
All tracks are written by Priya Ragu and Japhna Gold.

Santhosam track listing
No.	Title	Length
1.	"Ammama's Note"	0:18
2.	"School Me Like That"	2:35
3.	"One Way Ticket"	2:57
4.	"Hit the Bucket"	2:55
5.	"Black Goose"	2:33
6.	"Let Me Breathe (Reprise)"	2:21
7.	"Vacation"	2:29
8.	"Easy"	2:26
9.	"Adalam Va!"	2:22
10.	"CornerStore"	2:38
11.	"Uyire"	3:26
12.	"Power"	2:55
13.	"Escape"	2:48
14.	"Lovely Day"	2:58
15.	"Mani Osai"	4:34
Total length:		40:15

== Charts ==
Chart performance for Santhosam
Chart (2023)	Peak position
Swiss Albums (Schweizer Hitparade)	94
