= Mess Around (Forest Claudette song) =

2023 single by Forest Claudette

Single by Forest Claudette featuring EarthGang

from the album Everything Was Green
- Released: 24 March 2023
- Length: 3:50
- Label: Forest Claudette; Sony
- Songwriters: Hamilton-Reeves; Paul Meany; Olu O. Fann; Eian Undrai Parker
- Producer: Paul Meany

Forest Claudette featuring EarthGang singles chronology
"Goodbye" (2022)	"Mess Around" (2023)	"Motor in the Sand" (2023)

Music video
- "Mess Around" on YouTube

"Mess Around" is a song by Australian alt-R&B singer Forest Claudette featuring American hip hop duo, EarthGang. It was released on 24 March 2023 as the lead single from Claudette's second EP, Everything Was Green.

== Reception ==
About the track, Claudette said, "Around the time I wrote 'Mess Around' I was going on dates and exploring LA for the first time as an adult. I met some incredible people and they helped me learn a lot about myself. Even though it has this real f**k boy energy, to me the song is about feeling confident in what you want and feeling comfortable to communicate that with whoever, knowing they might not feel the same. But that's life bbyyyy [sic]."

In speaking with Acclaim Magazine, Claudette said they had finished the song when the label suggested the inclusion of the featured artist. Claudette shortlisted names of people and was pleased when Earthgang agreed to it. Claudette told Acclaim Magazine "We had a chat on the phone about the song and the energy of it; they were both very generous with their time. It was awesome. Definitely a moment I won't forget."

At the 2023 Music Victoria Awards, the song was nominated for Best Song or Track.

At the 2023 ARIA Music Awards, the song won the ARIA Award for Best Soul/R&B Release.

== Music video ==
The Grey Ghost directed music video premiered on YouTube on 6 April 2023.

== Reception ==
Sose Fuamoli from Triple Jcalled the track "slinky", saying "From the jump, the track captivates; rich production matches the energy of both artists on the record."

Emma Whines from The Music said "'Mess Around' is slinky, sexy and perfectly executed by Claudette whose smooth voice makes you feel some type of way in this single. Filled with soul-centred soundscapes, funky beats and groovy bass lines, 'Mess Around' is the slow jam of the summer."

Ayodeji Ibrahim Lateef from Yours Truly called the song "mesmerising", saying "The enticing music, soulful but ethereal, merges current rhythms with flashes of old-school soul."
