= Priya Ragu =

Swiss singer

- Born: Priya Ragu; 1986 (age 39–40); Switzerland
- Occupations: Singer; songwriter
- Musical career
- Genre: Pop
- Label: Warner
- Website: www.priya-ragu.com

Priya Ragu (born 1986), is a Tamil-Swiss singer-songwriter. She rose to prominence in 2020 for her debut single, "Good Love 2.0".

== Biography ==
Priya was born in 1986 to Sri Lankan-Tamil parents in Switzerland. Her parents fled Sri Lanka in 1980s during the civil war. She was raised in Canton St. Gallen City, Switzerland.

Her parents hosted jam sessions with others from the Swiss Tamil community with the intention of making Priya aware of her Tamil heritage as a young child. Her father formed a small band performing songs which featured in Kollywood films. In her father's band, she performed as a singer, her father played tabla and her brother (Japhna Gold) played keyboard.

== Career ==
After completing her secondary education, she became an accountant for Swiss International Air Lines and moved to Zürich. Although she became a technical buyer for the airline, she continued recording songs in her spare time. Despite her childhood experiences as a singer, her parents did not want her to become a full-fledged professional musician due to their strict and conservative attitudes. Her parents were strictly against western music, MTV videos and pop songs which they considered to be obscene. She however practiced pop songs secretly at her room against her parents' wishes.

She moved to New York in 2017 for a period of 6 months in order to pursue her dream career in music. However, she did not meet any music artists during her brief stay in the United States and instead only found herself collaborating with her music producer-brother, Japhna Gold. During her temporary stay in the US, she collaborated with her brother via Skype as the latter was staying in Switzerland, who encouraged her to record songs in Tamil and the duo nicknamed their mixture of R&B, soul, hip-hop, and traditional Tamil music "Ragu Wavy".

Her debut mixtape titled damnshestamil consists of 10 tracks include the singles "Good Love 2.0", "Chicken Lemon Rice", "Kamali", "Forgot About", and "Lockdown". "Good Love 2.0" was the first track off of damnshestamil to be released as it was unveiled on 2 October 2020. It was also played on popular BBC radio show Future Sounds and she consequently signed a record deal with Warner Music in October 2020. damnshestamil was produced in collaboration with her brother, Japhna Gold, included backing vocals from her father, and its closing track, "Santhosam" (transl. Happiness), was written by her mother.

She has appeared in British Vogue, on BBC Radio 1 and on the FIFA 21 soundtrack. Vogue India named her as one of the 6 musicians who are about to blow up in 2021. Her song Chicken Lemon Rice featured in the 2022 film Wedding Season.

== Discography ==
=== Studio albums ===
Title	Details
Santhosam	Released: 20 October 2023; Label: Warner; Formats: Digital download, streaming, vinyl
Madras	Released: 26 November 2026; Label: AWAL; Formats: Digital download, streaming, vinyl

=== Mixtapes ===
Title	Details	Peak chart positions
Title	Details	SWI
damnshestamil	Released: 3 September 2021; Label: Warner; Format: Digital download, streaming, vinyl; Track listing: 1. "Leaf High"; 2. "Good Love 2.0"; 3. "Lockdown"; 4. "Lighthouse"; 5. "Anything"; 6. "Chicken Lemon Rice"; 7. "Deli"; 8. "Kamali"; 9. "Forgot About"; 10. "Santhosam" (Bonus Track)	46

=== Singles ===
Title	Year	Peak chart positions		Album
Title	Year	UK	UK Asian	Album
"Good Love 2.0"	2020	—	8	damnshestamil
"Chicken Lemon Rice"	2021	—	2	damnshestamil
"Forgot About"	2021	—	16	damnshestamil
"Kamali"	2021	—	15	damnshestamil
"Lockdown"	2021	—	—	damnshestamil
"Illuminous"	2022	—	—	Non-album single
"Adalam Va!"	2022	—	—	Santhosam
"Rockin' Around the Christmas Tree"	2022	49	—	Non-album single
"Easy"	2023	—	—	Santhosam
"Vacation"	2023	—	—	Santhosam
"Black Goose"	2023	—	—	Santhosam
"One Way Ticket"	2023	—	—	Santhosam
"Finally"	2026	—	—	Madras
"Madras"	2026	—	—	Madras

=== Music videos ===
Title	Year	Director(s)
"Good Love 2.0"	2020	Aneesh (Melting Clock)
"Chicken Lemon Rice"	2021	Dumas Haddad
"Forgot About" Official Lyric Video	2021	Jasper Cable Alexander
"Kamali"	2021	Sasha Rainbow
"Lockdown"	2021	Dumas Haddad
"Illuminous"	2022	Silence
"Adalam Va!"	2022	Sasha Nathwani

== Awards and nominations ==
Year	Organization	Category	Nominated work	Result	Ref.
2021	UK Music Video Awards	Best Wardrobe Styling in a Video	"Chicken Lemon Rice"	Nominated	
2021	BBC	Sound of 2022	Herself	Nominated	
2022	MTV UK	Push One to Watch	Herself	Nominated	
2022	Swiss Music Awards	Best Talent	Herself	Nominated	
2022	MTV Europe Music Awards	Best Swiss Act	Herself	Nominated	
