= Say She She =

American female singing trio

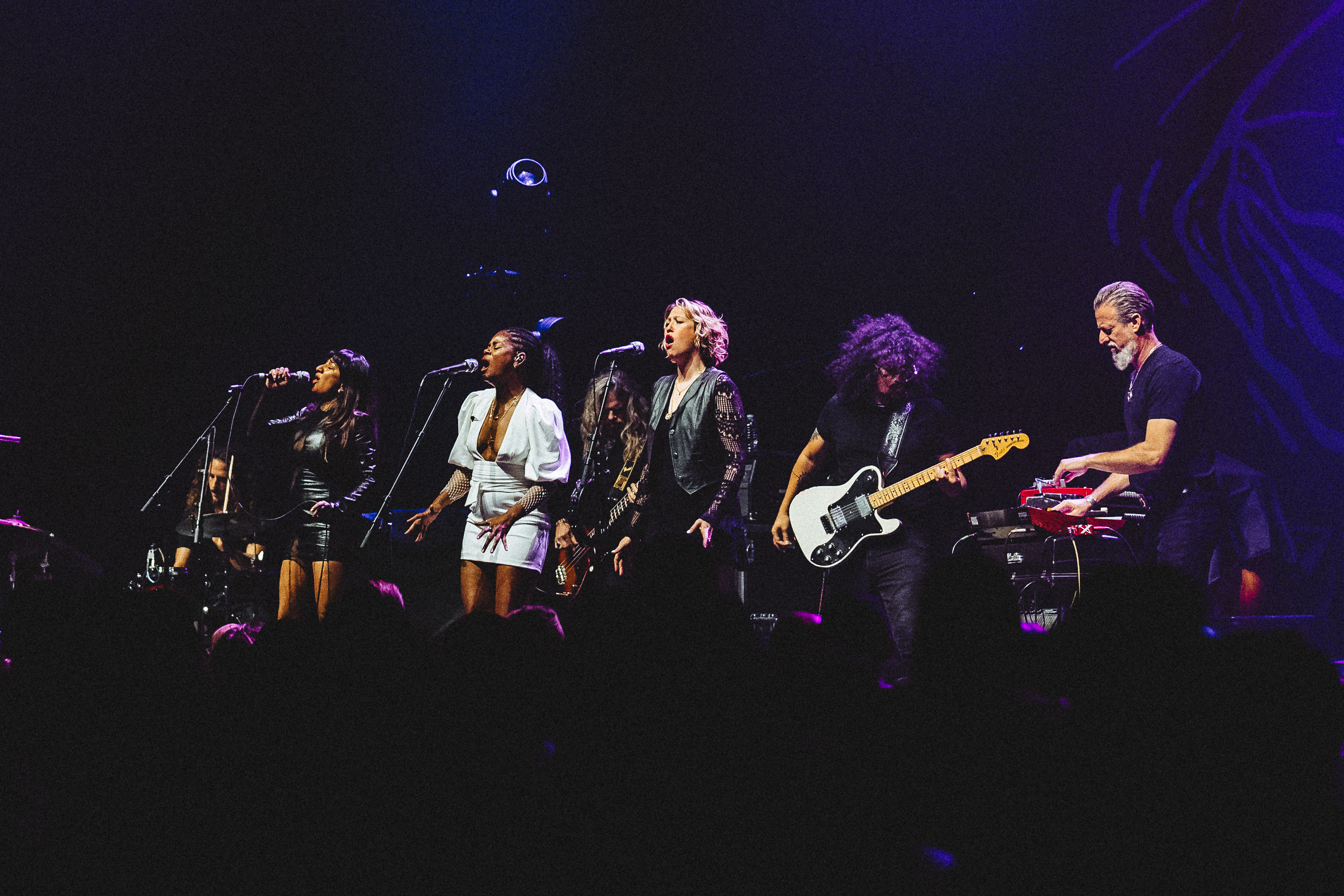
- Say She She at the Moody Theater in Austin, Texas

Background information
- Origin: Brooklyn, New York
- Genres: Disco, funk, soul
- Years active: 2021–present
- Label: Colemine/Karma Chief Records
- Members: Piya Malik, Sabrina Cunningham, Nya Brown
- Website: saysheshe.com

Say She She is an American disco/funk group from Brooklyn, New York, formed in 2021. The group is led by classically trained singers Piya Malik (formerly of El Michels Affair and Chicano Batman), Sabrina Cunningham, and Nya Brown, who are supported by a backing band. Their music, self-described as "discodelic soul" with "dreamy harmonies," prominently combines disco and 70s funk, among other influences. The group cites Nile Rodgers and Chic as major influences on their sound. Their most recent album Cut & Rewind was released in October 2025.

== History ==
Malik and Cunningham originally met in 2017 as neighbors in the same apartment building in Manhattan. Both professional singers, they could hear each other practicing and eventually struck up a friendship and performing partnership. In 2021, they attended a house party in Harlem where they were joined by Brown for a spontaneous rooftop singing session. Shortly thereafter, the trio began writing music together and adopted the name Say She She as a tribute to Chic. They were soon collaborating with musicians from Orgone, The Dap-Kings, The Shacks, and Chicano Batman. Their backing band consists of Orgone members Dan Hastie (keyboards), Sam Halterman (drums), Dale Jennings (bass), and Sergio Rios (guitar).

In 2022, their debut album Prism was released on independent label Karma Chief/Colemine Records. The album received a positive review from The Guardian, with the reviewer giving it five out of five stars and calling it a "delightful place to visit for half an hour." On February 4, 2023, CBS Saturday Morning aired the band's first television appearance. In a television interview with Anthony Mason of CBS later that year, they were surprised by a video from their inspiration Nile Rodgers, who told them he was pleased to hear them making music inspired by his group in such "an organic way."

Their second album Silver was released in September 2023. The album was positively reviewed by public radio station KCRW who ranked it as their top album of 2023. WXPN named Say She She the "Artist to Watch" in October, and KEXP placed the album in the top 20 of its year-end album reviews. They toured throughout 2023, performing in Europe and the US, including at the Glastonbury Festival and the Hollywood Bowl. Their third album Cut & Rewind was released in October 2025. To support the album, the group embarked on their first major headlining tour in early 2026.

On March 8, 2026, Asha Puthli and Say She She released the collaborative single "Pawa!"

== Discography ==
- Prism (2022)
- Silver (2023)
- Cut & Rewind (2025)
