= Robert Finley (musician) =

American singer-songwriter

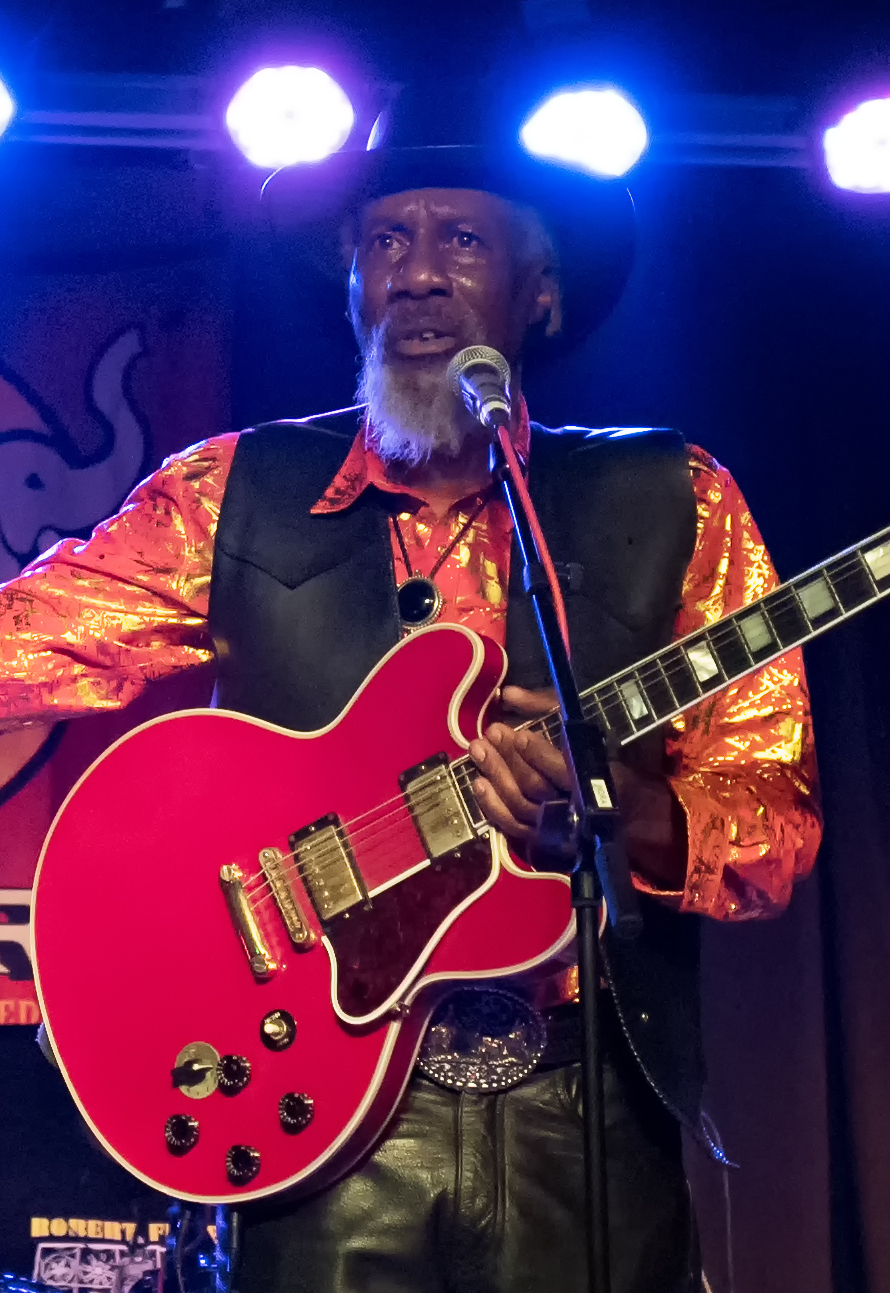
- Finley at Indra Club 64 Hamburg, 2018

Background information
- Born: February 13, 1954 (age 72); Bernice, Louisiana, U.S.
- Genres: Blues, soul
- Occupation: Singer-songwriter
- Instruments: Vocals, guitar
- Labels: Easy Eye Sound, Big Legal Mess

Robert Finley (born February 13, 1954) is an American blues and soul singer-songwriter and guitarist. After decades of performing semi-professionally followed by time away from music, Finley made a comeback in 2016. He released his debut album, Age Don't Mean a Thing, later in the year, which was met positively by critics.

== Life and career ==
Finley was born and raised in Bernice, Louisiana. At 11 years old, he began practicing the guitar he had purchased from a thrift store. Gospel music played a crucial role in his early development: "I always went to gospel quartet groups and I always took the front row seat, and I just watched their fingers", recollected Finley in an interview. In 1970, he joined the U.S. Army, originally to serve as a helicopter technician in Germany. Upon his arrival, however, Finley accommodated the army band's need for a guitarist and bandleader by traveling with the group throughout Europe until he was discharged.

After returning to Louisiana, Finley worked as a part-time street performer, leader of the gospel group Brother Finley and the Gospel Sisters, and as a carpenter. He was deemed legally blind and forced to retire from carpentry. In 2015, Music Maker Relief Foundation, a non-profit organization that supports aging blues musicians, discovered Finley busking before a gig in Arkansas. With their help, Finley made a musical comeback, featuring him in packaged tours with acts including Robert Lee Coleman and Alabama Slim.

Finley released his first album, Age Don't Mean a Thing, on September 30, 2016, on Big Legal Mess Records. Although for the most part Finley was a bluesman, his record producer Bruce Watson keyed in on more of his soulful compositions. With production credits from Watson and Jimbo Mathus, Finley traveled to Memphis to record the album with members of the Bo-Keys. He penned all but two of the tracks, highlighted by an autobiographical title song, on Age Don't Mean a Thing, evoking influences from Booker T. and the MGs, James Brown, and B. B. King. Music journalists were highly receptive to Finley's comeback and album, particularly his revitalizing take on Southern soul.

After Age Don't Mean a Thing, Finley got connected with Dan Auerbach of the Black Keys. Auerbach and Finley then released an original soundtrack for the graphic novel Murder Ballads, published by Z2 Comics. Shortly after the release of the Murder Ballads soundtrack, Billboard announced that Finley would be releasing an album produced and co-written by Auerbach.

The album, Goin' Platinum! was released on Easy Eye Sound (Nonesuch Records) on December 8, 2017. The following year Finley joined Auerbach's Easy Eye Sound Revue tour. Finley followed up the Easy Eye Sound Revue tour with a series of headline shows around the world.

In 2019, it was announced via social media that Finley was a contestant for the fourteenth season of America's Got Talent. AGT released a sneak peek where Finley sang an original song, called "Get It While You Can". He managed to reach the live shows but was eventually eliminated in the semi-finals.

In 2021, Finley announced the album Sharecropper's Son, which was released May 21, 2021, on Easy Eye Sound. The album was autobiographical in nature, and centered around Finley's upbringing on a crop share in Louisiana. The album was produced by Dan Auerbach.

Finley is featured on the cover of the 2023 compilation album Tell Everybody 21st Century Juke Joint Blues From Easy Eye Sound where he performs the titular album track. Finley's fourth album Black Bayou was released in October 2023. Continuing the collaboration with Auerbach's label, the album features the return of prior collaborators from Sharecropper's Son Kenny Brown, bass guitarist Eric Deaton, with the addition of drummers Patrick Carney (of The Black Keys) and Jeffery Clemens (of G.Love & Special Sauce).

On October 10, 2025, Finley released the album Hallelujah! Don't Let The Devil Fool Ya, where he is backed by his daughter, Christy Johnson. The album was produced by Dan Auerbach.
