= Miguel Atwood-Ferguson =

American violist (born 1980)

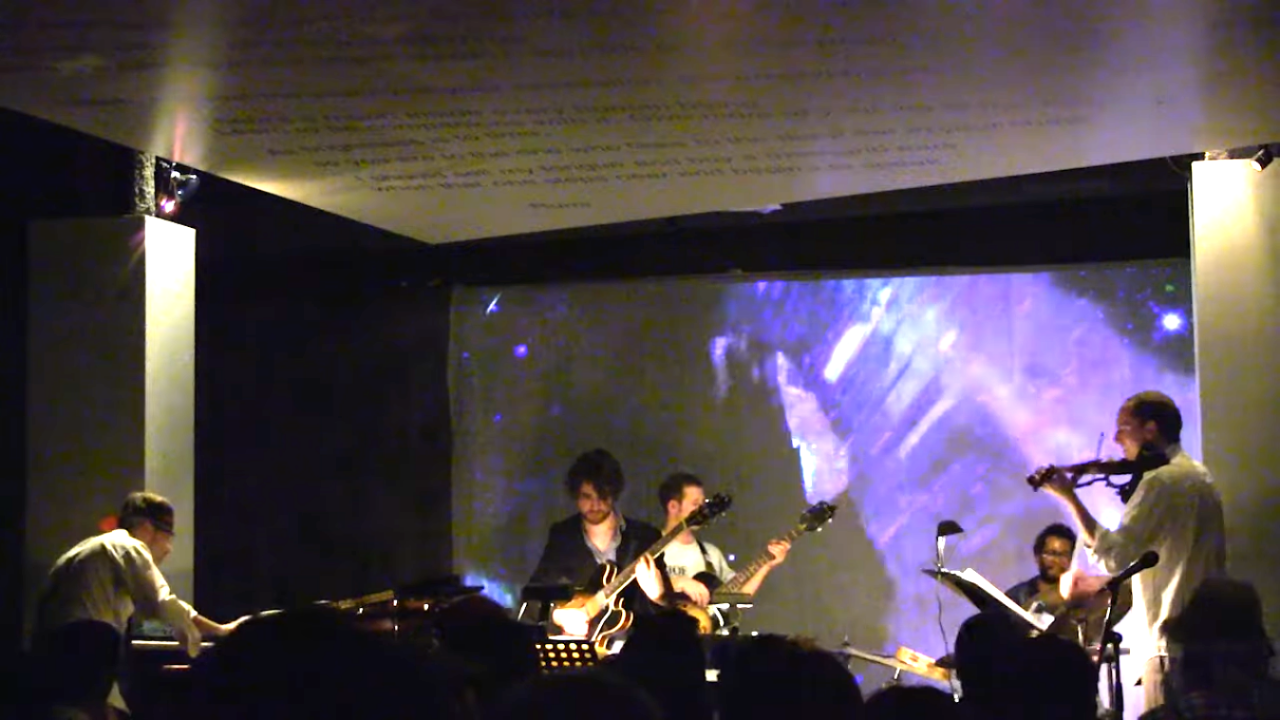
- Atwood-Ferguson (right) performing with the Miguel Atwood-Ferguson Ensemble in Los Angeles in 2014

Background information
- Born: Miguel Atwood-Ferguson; May 3, 1980 (age 45); Topanga, California, U.S.
- Genres: Hip hop; classical; jazz
- Occupations: Musician; session musician; multi-instrumentalist; composer; orchestral conductor
- Instruments: Viola; violin
- Labels: Brainfeeder
- Website: miguelatwoodferguson.com

Miguel Atwood-Ferguson (born May 3, 1980) is an American multi-instrumentalist, session musician, arranger, composer, music director, producer, DJ, orchestral conductor and educator. He has contributed to over 500 recordings and scored for television and film with various musicians.

== Early life and education ==
Miguel Atwood-Ferguson grew up in Topanga, California, an arts district in Western Los Angeles. His parents instilled in him an appreciation of cultures from around the world and an ethic of dedicated study. His father is a multi-instrumentalist, backing people such as Etta James, Screamin' Jay Hawkins, Ry Cooder, and Johnny Otis. His mother was an educator with a passion for empowering those around her.

Together his parents created a childhood environment rich in diverse sounds. As an infant when left alone in his crib, his parents put on repeat tapes with music by Beethoven, Chopin, Mozart, Bach and Brahms. At age four, Atwood-Ferguson's parents enrolled him in weekly violin lessons after he expressed interest in playing the violin upon seeing other children playing the instrument at the music institute where his brother was studying piano.

Following this early exposure, he enrolled in weekly violin, chamber music, and music theory lessons, and joined the Orchestra da' Camera at the Colburn School from ages 8 to 15. During this time he began composing for symphonic orchestra, with his first original symphonic composition, at age ten, played by the Pacific Palisades Symphony.

At age twelve he switched to viola and continued focusing on classical music while an interest in the music of Motown, Jimi Hendrix, and the Beatles also continued to develop. In high school he developed interests in jazz and hip-hop which have carried over into a lifelong passion and career.

Atwood-Ferguson attended University of Southern California in Los Angeles, graduating with a bachelor's degree in classical viola.

== Career ==
Atwood-Ferguson has contributed to over 500 recordings and scored for television and film with musicians such as Ray Charles, Flying Lotus, Dr. Dre, Mary J. Blige, Bilal, Seu Jorge, and Thundercat. In 2011, with a full orchestra he reimagined some of J Dilla's music on an album titles Suite for Ma Dukes. He played at Melbourne Jazz Festival in 2013.

== Personal life ==
Atwood-Ferguson practices Nichiren Buddhism with the Soka Gakkai International.

== Discography ==
=== Albums ===
- Suite for Ma Dukes (Mochilla, 2011)
- Chicago Waves (International Anthem, 2020) – with Carlos Gabriel Niño
- Chicago Waves Remixes (International Anthem, 2020) – Four remixes made with music originally composed and recorded by Niño and Atwood-Ferguson for Chicago Waves
- Les Jardins Mystiques, Vol. 1 (Brainfeeder, 2023)

=== Appearances ===
- Wu Hen (Black Focus, 2020) by Kamaal Williams – contributed string arrangements
- Fragments (Ninja Tune, 2022) by Bonobo – guest artist
