= Les Jardins Mystiques, Vol. 1 =

Studio album by Miguel Atwood-Ferguson
- Released: November 10, 2023
- Recorded: 2009–2023
- Length: 210:15
- Language: Ancient Greek, English, Hebrew, Japanese, Sanskrit, Spanish, Swahili
- Label: Brainfeeder

Miguel Atwood-Ferguson chronology
Chicago Waves Remixes (2020)	Les Jardins Mystiques, Vol. 1 (2023)

Les Jardins Mystiques, Vol. 1 is a 2023 studio album by Miguel Atwood-Ferguson. It has received positive reviews from critics.

== Reception ==
According to the review aggregator Metacritic, Jardins Mystiques, Vol. 1 received "generally favorable reviews" based on a weighted average score of 72 out of 100 from four critic scores. Editors at AllMusic rated this album 4 out of 5 stars, with critic Thom Jurek writing that "the music is a confluence of improv, jazz, classical, crossover, ambient, etc." that features many "heavy hitters" as guests that results in "a statement that reveals the vastness of Atwood-Ferguson's inspiration, creative breadth, and musical vision without compromise". Mojo's John Mulvey rated this album 3 out of 5 stars, writing that "the highlights foreground Atwood-Ferguson as a widescreen visionary in the David Axelrod and Charles Stepney tradition, with a Rolodex of jazz hitters to call on". Louis Pattison of Uncut gave Les Jardins Mystiques, Vol. 1 4 out of 5 stars, calling it a "sprawling set [that] is a testament to his talents not just as multi-instrumentalist but as bandleader" and "a rapturous unwind through sprightly bouzouki-powered jazz, soulful strings and serene New Age".

Editors at AllMusic included this on their list of favorite jazz albums of 2023. Editors at Reader's Digest included this among the best albums of the year.

== Track listing ==
1. "Kiseki" – 4:48
2. "Persinette" – 1:47
3. "Narva" – 0:42
4. "Eudaimonia" – 10:08
5. "Porpita" – 3:26
6. "Nazo No Tenkai (Ernok)" – 1:23
7. "Mångata" – 3:25
8. "Ano Yo" – 12:32
9. "Zarra" – 0:59
10. "Kairos (Amor Fati)" – 14:04
11. "Magnolia (Aisling)" – 1:51
12. "Cho Oyu" – 8:58
13. "Matumaini" – 4:50
14. "Zoticus" – 1:06
15. "Légäsi" – 8:38
16. "Votivus" – 1:35
17. "Querencia" – 1:33
18. "Kundinyota" – 2:38
19. "Dragons of Eden" – 1:41
20. "Eunoia" – 6:12
21. "Znaniya (Falkor)" – 3:59
22. "Tzedakah" – 9:53
23. "Apocrypha" – 2:01
24. "Asherah" – 3:01
25. "Plotinus" – 0:36
26. "Kairos (Kefi)" – 5:08
27. "Qumran" – 4:53
28. "Makaria" – 1:47
29. "Kupaianaha" – 8:22
30. "Taijasa" – 4:50
31. "Vesta" – 1:23
32. "Ziggurat" – 1:32
33. "Ziya" – 3:20
34. "Scar" – 6:36
35. "Let the Light Shine In" – 1:06
36. "Komorebi" – 2:49
37. "Daydream" – 4:10
38. "Dream Dance" – 12:49
39. "Apotheosis" – 7:59
40. "Magnolia (Astronomia Nova)" – 1:47
41. "Moksha" – 6:11
42. "Datsuzoku" – 2:12
43. "Hypatia" – 3:04
44. "Kuleana" – 1:09
45. "Aldous" – 0:34
46. "Jijivisha" – 2:38
47. "Paititi" – 0:51
48. "Airavata" – 4:31
49. "Znaniya (Ahura Mazda)" – 3:52
50. "Nag Hammadi" – 1:23
51. "Halcyon" – 1:24
52. "Sweet Invitation" – 2:03

== Personnel ==
- Miguel Atwood-Ferguson – instrumentation, including violin, viola, cello and keyboards, photography, art direction
- JD Beck
- David Crunelle – artwork
- Devin Daniels – alto saxophone on "Ano Yo"
- Jamael Dean
- DOMi
- Marcus Gilmore
- Josh Johnson
- Bennie Maupin – bass clarinet on "Kiseki"
- Carlos Niño
- Gabe Noel
- Jeff Parker
- Deantoni Parks
- Austin Peralta
- Burniss Travis II
- Thundercat
- Miles Showell – mastering
- Adam Stover – layout
- Benjamin Fredrick Vukelic – mixing
- Kamasi Washington
- Jamire Williams

== See also ==
- 2023 in American music
- List of 2023 albums
