= 2025 in rhythm and blues =

This article summarizes the events, album releases, and album release dates in rhythm and blues for the year 2025.

== Events ==
=== January ===
- On January 3, Brenton Wood died at the age of 83.
- On January 10, Sam Moore died at the age of 89.
- On January 20, Bob Kuban died at the age of 84.

=== February ===
- On February 2, Gene Barge died at the age of 98. On the same day, the 67th Annual Grammy Awards were held. Beyoncé won Album of the Year for Cowboy Carter. Muni Long won Best R&B Performance for "Made for Me (Live on BET)". Lucky Daye won Best Traditional R&B Performance for "That's You". SZA won Best R&B Song for "Saturn". AverySunshine and NxWorries tied for Best Progressive R&B Album for So Glad to Know You and Why Lawd?, respectively. Chris Brown won Best R&B Album for 11:11 (Deluxe). Tank and the Bangas won Best Spoken Word Poetry Album for The Heart, The Mind, The Soul. Prince, Taj Mahal, and Frankie Beverly received the Lifetime Achievement Awards. Alicia Keys received the Dr. Dre Global Impact Award.
- On February 5, Irv Gotti died at the age of 54.
- On February 12, Tommy Hunt died at the age of 91. Jimi Mbaye died at the age of 67.
- On February 18, the MOBO Awards 2025 were held. Odeal won Best Newcomer and Best R&B/Soul Act. Mnelia won Video of the Year for "My Man". Ayra Starr won Best African Music Act and Best International Act.
- On February 20, Jerry Butler died at the age of 85.
- On February 21, Gwen McCrae died at the age of 81. Khalil Fong died at the age of 41.
- On February 22, Linsey Alexander died at the age of 82. On the same day, the 56th NAACP Image Awards were held. Beyoncé won Outstanding Female Artist and Outstanding Album for Cowboy Carter. Doechii won Outstanding New Artist. Chris Brown won Outstanding Male Artist, Outstanding International Song with Davido for "Hmmm" and Outstanding Soul/R&B Song for "Residuals". Adam Blackstone & Fantasia won Outstanding Duo, Group or Collaboration (Traditional) for "Summertime". Wizkid and Brent Faiyaz won Outstanding Duo, Group or Collaboration (Contemporary) for "Piece of My Heart". Samara Joy won Outstanding Jazz Album for Portrait. Luther: Never Too Much won Outstanding Directing in a Documentary (Television or Motion Picture) and Outstanding Documentary (Motion Picture).
- On February 23, Chris Jasper died at the age of 73.
- On February 24, Roberta Flack died at the age of 88.
- On February 27, the 22nd Korean Music Awards were held. Sumin & Slom won Best R&B & Soul Album for Miniseries 2. Jung In & Mild Beats won Best R&B & Soul Song for "Blame".

=== March ===
- On March 1, Angie Stone died at the age of 63. Paulito FG died at the age of 63. On the same day, the Brit Awards 2025 were held. Raye won Best R&B Act.
- On March 3, Randy Brown died at the age of 72.
- On March 4, Roy Ayers died at the age of 84.
- On March 7, D'Wayne Wiggins died at the age of 64.
- On March 10, Wheesung died at the age of 43. Stedman Pearson died at the age of 60.
- On March 13, Ann Sexton died at the age of 78.
- On March 17, the 2025 iHeartRadio Music Awards were held. Muni Long won R&B Song of the Year for "Made for Me". SZA won R&B Artist of the Year. 4Batz won Best New R&B Artist. Usher won R&B Album of the Year for Coming Home. Nelly received the iHeartRadio Landmark Award. Mariah Carey won the iHeartRadio Icon Award.
- On March 19, the 2025 MTV Video Music Awards Japan were held. Kroi won Best R&B Video for "Jewel".
- On March 25, Alice Tan Ridley died at the age of 72.
- On March 30, the Juno Awards of 2025 were held. Mustafa won Video of the Year for "Name of God" and Songwriter of the Year. Jack Rochon won Producer of the Year. Big Dave McLean won Blues Album of the Year for This Old Life. Aqyila won Contemporary R&B/Soul Recording of the Year for Bloom. TheHonestGuy won Traditional R&B/Soul Recording of the Year for Velvet Soul. AP Dhillon won South Asian Music Recording of the Year for The Brownprint. Jessie Reyez and Big Sean won Rap Single of the Year for "Shut Up".

=== April ===
- On April 1, George Freeman died at the age of 97.
- On April 16, Mac Gayden at the age of 83.
- On April 30, Joe Louis Walker died at the age of 75. On the same day, the APRA Music Awards of 2025 were held. Kaiit won Most Performed R&B / Soul Work for "Space".

=== May ===
- On May 9, John Edwards died at the age of 80.
- On May 19, Colton Ford died at the age of 62.
- On May 21, the 2025 Music Awards Japan were held. Hikaru Utada won Best Japanese R&B/Contemporary Song for "Automatic" and Best Japanese R&B/Contemporary Artist. Ariana Grande won Best International R&B/Contemporary Song in Japan for "We Can't Be Friends (Wait for Your Love)".
- On May 26, the American Music Awards of 2025 were held. The Weeknd won Favorite Male R&B Artist and Favorite R&B Album for Hurry Up Tomorrow. SZA won Favorite Female R&B Artist and Favorite R&B Song for "Saturn". Doechii won Social Song of the Year for "Anxiety". Janet Jackson was honored with the Icon Award.
- On May 29, the 2025 Aotearoa Music Awards were held. Aaradhna won Best Soul / RnB Artist.

=== June ===
- On June 5, Wayne Lewis died at the age of 68.
- On June 9, Sly Stone died at the age of 82. On the same day, the BET Awards 2025 were held. Chris Brown won the Viewer's Choice Award for "Residuals" and Best Male R&B/Pop Artist. SZA won Best Collaboration alongside Kendrick Lamar for "Luther" and Best Female R&B/Pop Artist. Leon Thomas won Best New Artist. Summer Walker won the BET Her Award for "Heart of a Woman". Ayra Starr won Best International Act. Luther: Never Too Much won Best Movie. Mariah Carey and Jamie Foxx received the Ultimate Icon Award. On the same day, the 2025 Libera Awards were held. Ruthie Foster won Best Blues Record for Mileage. Mavis Staples won Best R&B Record for "Worthy". Raye won Self-Released Record of the Year for "Genesis". Thee Sacred Souls won Best Soul/Funk Record for Got a Story to Tell.
- On June 16, Patti Drew died at the age of 80.
- On June 21, the 34th Seoul Music Awards were held. RM won the R&B/ Hip-hop Award.

=== July ===
- Erik Rico died.
- On July 16, Connie Francis died at the age of 87.
- On July 20, Malcolm-Jamal Warner died at the age of 54. Owen Gray died at the age of 86.
- On July 31, the AIR Awards of 2025 were held. Emma Donovan won Best Independent Blues and Roots Album or EP for Til My Song Is Done. Ella Thompson won Best Independent Soul/R&B Album or EP for Ripple On the Wing.

=== August ===
- On August 4, Terry Reid died at the age of 75.
- On August 10, Bobby Whitlock died at the age of 77.
- On August 12, Cool John Ferguson died at the age of 71.

=== September ===
- Omen died at the age of 49.
- On September 7, the 2025 MTV Video Music Awards were held. Ariana Grande won Video of the Year, Best Long Form Video, and Best Pop for Brighter Days Ahead. Mariah Carey won Best R&B for "Type Dangerous" and received the Michael Jackson Video Vanguard Award. Tyla won Best Afrobeats for "Push 2 Start".
- On September 16, the 2025 Polaris Music Prize was held. Yves Jarvis won the album prize for All Cylinders. Mustafa won the song prize for "Gaza Is Calling".
- On September 29, Yury Chernavsky died at the age of 78.

=== October ===
- On October 8, Terry "Buzzy" Johnson died at the age of 86.
- On October 14, D'Angelo died at the age of 51.
- On October 21, the Filipino Music Awards 2025 were held. Dionela won R&B Song of the Year for "Marilag".
- On October 30, the 2025 UK Music Video Awards were held. Celeste won Best R&B / Soul / Jazz Video – UK for "This is Who I Am". Audrey Nuna won Best R&B / Soul / Jazz Video – International for "Mine". Olivia Dean won Best Pop / R&B / Soul / Jazz Video – Newcomer for "Nice to Each Other". Bakar won Best Casting in a Video for "Lonyo!".

=== November ===
- On November 3, Victor Conte died at the age of 75.
- On November 7, the Los 40 Music Awards 2025 were held. Rels B won Best Spain Urban Act. Mora won Best Global Latin Urban Act. Rauw Alejandro won Best Global Latin Music Video for "Carita Linda".
- On November 19, the 16th Hollywood Music in Media Awards were held. Sinners (Original Motion Picture Soundtrack) won Best Original Score in a Feature Film. Miles Caton won Best Original Song in a Feature Film and Best Song in a Film Onscreen Performance for "I Lied to You". Aiyana-Lee won best Best Original Song in an Independent Film for "Highest 2 Lowest". Qing Madi won Best Original Score in a Short Film (Animated) for Valorant. On the same day, the 2025 ARIA Music Awards were held. The Teskey Brothers won Best Blues & Roots Album for Live at The Hammersmith Apollo. Boy Soda won Best Soul/R&B Release for "Lil' Obsession". The Kid Laroi won Song of the Year for "Girls".
- On November 21, Jellybean Johnson died at the age of 69.
- On November 23, Phil Upchurch died at the age of 84.
- On November 26, Judy Cheeks died at the age of 71.
- On November 30, Billy Nichols died at the age of 85.

=== December ===
- On December 3, Steve Cropper died at the age of 84.
- On December 13, Carl Carlton died at the age of 72.
- On December 14, the 31st Annual South African Music Awards were held. Elaine won Best R&B/Soul Album for Stone Cold Heart. Ayra Starr won the Rest of Africa Award for The Year I Turned 21.
- On December 26, Don Bryant died at the age of 83.

== Released albums ==
=== January ===
Day	Artist(s)	Album	Record label(s)	Entering chart position
3	Nia Nadurata	Still Living with My Parents	Arts & Crafts Productions	
8	Wolfacejoeyy	Cupid	Self-released	
10	Moonchild Sanelly	Full Moon	Transgressive	
10	Otis Kane	Violet	Nettwerk Music Group	
10	Rilès	Survival Mode	Self-released	
10	Skiifall	Lovers Till I'm Gone	Peoples Champ	
15	Maro & Nasaya	Lifeline	Secca, Venice	
15	Nariaki	Zatto	Self-released	
17	Keke Palmer	DivaGurl: A Story By Keke Palmer	Big Bosses, The SRG, ILS Group	
17	Mac Miller	Balloonerism	Warner	Debuted at No. 3 on the Billboard 200
17	Yola	My Way	S-Curve Records	
21	Minnie	Her	Cube	
24	Benjamin Booker	Lower	Fire Next Time, Thirty Tigers	
24	Charlie Bereal	Walk With The Father	Death Row Records, Gamma	
24	FKA Twigs	Eusexua	Young, Atlantic	Debuted at No. 3 on the UK Albums Chart; Debuted at No. 24 on the Billboard 200
24	JoJo	NGL	BMG	
24	Jordan Adetunji	A Jaguar's Dream	300 Entertainment, Warner UK	
24	Teddy Swims	I've Tried Everything but Therapy (Part 2)	Warner	Debuted at No. 4 on the Billboard 200
24	Young Franco	It's Franky Baby!	Neon	
29	Jacob Banks	Yonder: Book II	Nobody Records	
31	Brooke Combe	Dancing at the Edge of the World	Modern Sky UK	
31	Carl Thomas	Explosive	Music of the Sea	
31	Cymande	Renascence	BMG	
31	Eddie Chacon	Lay Low	Stones Throw	
31	Iniko	The Awakening	Columbia, Audio Angel	
31	Journey Montana	Lucky Girl Syndrome	10K Projects	
31	Qing Madi	I Am the Blueprint	Jton, Bu Vision	
31	The Weeknd	Hurry Up Tomorrow	XO, Republic	Debuted at No. 1 on the Billboard 200

=== February ===
Day	Artist(s)	Album	Record label(s)	Entering chart position
7	Biig Piig	11:11	Sony Music UK	
7	Chase Shakur	Wonderlove	Def Jam	
7	Johnnyswim	When the War is Over	Self-released	
7	Truice Young	Vices	Gamma	
11	Kelela	In the Blue Light	Warp Records	
12	Capella Grey	U Miss Me Yet?	Allepac the Family, 10K Projects	
14	Alessia Cara	Love & Hyperbole	Def Jam	
14	Candi Staton	Back To My Roots	Beracah Records	
14	Flau'jae	Flau & B	Flauge Entertainment	
14	Jacquees & DeJ Loaf	Fuck A Friendzone 2	Yellow World, FYB Records	
14	Jagged Edge	All Original Parts, Vol. 1	Self-released	
14	John Glacier	Like a Ribbon	Young	
14	Mereba	The Breeze Grew a Fire	Secretly Canadian	
14	PartyNextDoor & Drake	Some Sexy Songs 4 U	OVO Sound, Republic Records	Debuted at No. 1 on the Billboard 200
14	The Altons	Heartache in Room 14	Daptone	
14	They.	Love.Jones	Drink Sum Wtr	
18	Durand Bernarr	Bloom	Create Music Group	
21	Bren Joy	Sunset Black	Self-released	
21	Joan Thiele	Joanita	Sony Music Italy	
21	Morray	Long Story Short	Empire	
21	Nao	Jupiter	Little Tokyo Recordings, Sony Music	
21	Saint Jhn	Festival Season	Godd Complexx	
21	Sir Woman	If It All Works Out	ONErpm	
21	Tate McRae	So Close to What	RCA	Debuted at No. 1 on the Billboard 200
25	Senidah	Sen i Dah	Bassivity Digital	
27	Bini	Biniverse	Star Music	
28	Aloe Blacc	Stand Together	Grand Scheme, Vydia	
28	Banks	Off with Her Head	Self-released	
28	Everything Is Recorded	Temporary	XL	
28	Fridayy	Some Days I'm Good, Some Days I'm Not	Lost In Melody, Def Jam	Debuted at No. 51 on the Billboard 200
28	Hope Tala	Hope Handwritten	PMR Records	
28	Michi	Dirty Talk	Stones Throw	
28	Noemi	Nostalgia	Columbia, Sony Music	
28	Serpentwithfeet	Grip Sequel	Secretly Canadian	
28	Terrace Martin	Albion Files	Sounds of Crenshaw	
28	Yves Jarvis	All Cylinders	In Real Life	

=== March ===
Day	Artist(s)	Album	Record label(s)	Entering chart position
6	Ca7riel & Paco Amoroso	Papota	5020 Records	
7	Immasoul	Pistola	Empire	
7	Jacob Banks	Yonder: Book III	Nobody Records	
7	Jennie	Ruby	Odd Atelier, Columbia	Debuted at No. 7 on the Billboard 200
7	Tokimonsta	Eternal Reverie	Young Art	
10	Seulgi	Accidentally On Purpose	SM	
14	Twin Shadow	Georgie	Cheree Cheree	
21	Annie and the Caldwells	Can't Lose My (Soul)	Luaka Bop	
21	Bathe	Inside Voice(s)	MNRK	
21	Drew Sidora	I Did It To Me	MusicXchange	
21	Greentea Peng	Tell Dem It's Sunny	AWAL	
21	Jon B.	Waiting On You	Vibezelect	
21	Lonnie Holley	Tonky	Jagjaguwar	
27	Joeboy	Viva Lavida	Young Legend, Warner Music Africa	
28	Aqyila	Falling Into Place	Sony Canada	
28	Ariana Grande	Brighter Days Ahead	Republic	
28	Butcher Brown	Letters from the Atlantic	Concord Jazz	
28	Jessie Reyez	Paid In Memories	Fmly, Island	
28	Q	10 Songs	Boy Meets Euphoria, Columbia	
28	Vory	You Made Me This Way	Ikonic Global	
28	Yukimi	For You	Ninja Tune	

=== April ===
Day	Artist(s)	Album	Record label(s)	Entering chart position
2	Duckwrth	All American FuckBoy	Stem	
4	Dreamer Isioma	StarX Lover	Self-released	
4	Duendita	A strong desire to survive	10k	
4	Joe Kay	If Not Now, Then When?	Soulection Records, Colture	
4	Malcolm Todd	Malcolm Todd	Columbia	Debuted at No. 103 on the Billboard 200
4	Melanie Fiona	Say Yes	LoveLinc, Public Records, Colture, Title 9	
7	Mark	The Firstfruit	SM, Kakao	
11	Bon Iver	Sable, Fable	Jagjaguwar	Debuted at No. 11 on the Billboard 200
11	Bootsy Collins	Album of the Year #1 Funkateer	Bootzilla	
11	Galactic & Irma Thomas	Audience With the Queen	Tchoup-Zilla, Thirty Tigers	
11	KayCyy & Sign Crushes Motorist	Saddest Truth	BuVision, Columbia	
11	Valerie June	Owls, Omens and Oracles	Concord Records	
18	Alex Isley	When	Free Lunch, Warner Records	
18	Davido	5ive	Sony	
18	Keri Hilson	We Need to Talk: Love	Audible Art Club, Create	
18	Various artists	Sinners (Original Motion Picture Soundtrack)	Sony Masterworks	Debuted at No. 133 on the Billboard 200
19	Sault	10	Forever Living Originals	
25	Coco Jones	Why Not More?	High Standardz, Def Jam	Debuted at No. 59 on the Billboard 200
25	d4vd	Withered	Darkroom, Interscope	Debuted at No. 13 on the Billboard 200
25	Destin Conrad	Love on Digital	Above Ground, Empire	
25	Ledisi	The Crown	Listen Back, BMG	
25	Roy Woods	Dark Nights	OVO	
25	Silas Short	Lushland	Stones Throw	

=== May ===
Day	Artist(s)	Album	Record label(s)	Entering chart position
2	Elodie	Mi ami mi odi	Island	
2	Xavier Omär	HunnyMoon Mountain	XO Creative Club, RBC, BMG	
7	TA Thomas	Southern Soul	Def Jam	
8	Erika de Casier	Lifetime	Independent Jeep	
9	Brandon	Before You Go	Secretly Canadian	
9	Cuco	Ridin'	Interscope PS	
9	Galdive	Blue	Mom + Pop Music	
9	Kali Uchis	Sincerely	Capitol	Debuted at No. 2 on the Billboard 200
9	Kitschkreig & Dré Six	London's Calling	SoulForce, BMG	
9	Naomi Sharon	The Only Love We Know	OVO	
9	PinkPantheress	Fancy That	Warner UK	Debuted at No. 3 on the UK Albums Chart; Debuted at No. 72 on the Billboard 200
9	Raiche	Standards	Genre Defying Entertainment, Island Prolific, Atlantic	
9	Sailorr	From Florida's Finest	BuVision	
14	Bibi	Eve: Romance	Feel Ghood, Kakao, 88rising	
14	Savannah Ré	Formed	Matrimony	
16	Asiahn	Free	Love Train	
16	Cautious Clay	The Hours: Morning	Fantasy, Concord	
16	DRAM & Ellis Quinn	Leorpio	Waver, OneLand	
16	Emotional Oranges	Orenjii	Avant Garden, Colture	
16	Lido Pimienta	La Belleza	Anti	
16	MonoNeon	You Had Your Chance... Bad Attitude!	Floki Studios	
16	Mourning [A] BLKstar	Flowers For The Living	Don Giovanni Records	
16	Spill Tab	Angie	Because	
16	Surprise Chef	Superb	Big Crown Records	
16	Tanika Charles	Reasons to Stay	Record Kicks	
23	Eska	The Ordinary Life Of A Magic Woman	Earthling, Kartel	
23	Estelle	Stay Alta	1980, Fab Factory	
23	Smerz	Big City Life	Escho	
26	Seventeen	Happy Burstday	Pledis	Debuted at No. 2 on the Billboard 200
30	The Budos Band	VII	Diamond West	
30	Honey Bxby	Raw Honey	Rebirth, Art@War, Warner	
30	Obongjayar	Paradise Now	September	

=== June ===
Day	Artist(s)	Album	Record label(s)	Entering chart position
6	Cynthia Erivo	I Forgive You	Verve, Republic	Debuted at No. 165 on the Billboard 200
6	Eric Benét	The Co-Star	JBR	
6	Loaded Honey	Love Made Trees	Vetra, AWAL	
6	Omar	Brighter the Days	Impressive Collective, BBE Music	
6	Quinton Barnes	Black Noise	Watch That Ends The Night	
6	Sabrina Claudio	Fall in Love With Her	SC, Empire	
11	Psiryn	In The Key Of Us	Kandi Koated	
13	Brandee Younger	Gadabout Season	Impulse!, Verve	
13	Joe Armon-Jones	All The Quiet (Part II)	Aquarii	
13	Maiya Blaney	A Room With A Door That Closes	Lex Records	
13	Maleek Berry	If Only Love Was Enough	Berry's Room	
13	Witch	Sogolo	Desert Daze	
17	Bas & The Hics	Melanchronica	The Fiends	
20	Keke Palmer	Just Keke	Big Bosses, SoNo	
20	Kwn	With All Due Respect	RCA	
20	Terrace Martin & Kenyon Dixon	Come As You Are	Sounds of Crenshaw, Empire	
20	Yaya Bey	Do It Afraid	Drink Sum Wtr	
24	Madison McFerrin	Scorpio	Self-released	
27	Durand Jones & The Indications	Flowers	Dead Oceans	
27	Katseye	Beautiful Chaos	Hybe UMG, Geffen	Debuted at No. 4 on the Billboard 200
27	Leven Kali	LK99: The Prelude	Def Jam	

=== July ===
Day	Artist(s)	Album	Record label(s)	Entering chart position
2	NoMBe	DIÁSPORA	Position	
4	The Colleagues & October London	Love Language	Self-released	
7	D.O.	Bliss	SooSoo, Dreamus	
9	Tobi	Elements Vol. 2	Allwon	
11	Alina Bzhezhinska & Tulshi	Whispers of Rain	Tru Thoughts	
11	Burna Boy	No Sign of Weakness	Spaceship, Bad Habit, Atlantic	Debuted at No. 200 on the Billboard 200
11	Deante' Hitchcock	Just A Sample 3	Do Better Records, 195 Oak	
11	Giveon	Beloved	Epic	Debuted at No. 8 on the Billboard 200
11	Jane Handcock	It's Me, Not You	Death Row, Gamma	
11	Justin Bieber	Swag	Ithaca Holdings, Def Jam	Debuted at No. 2 on the Billboard 200
11	Kokoroko	Tuff Times Never Last	Brownswood	
11	Odeal	The Summer That Saved Me	OVMBR, LVRN	
11	Pastor Mike Jr.	Confetti and Conspiracies: The Amen Mixtape	Rock City	
11	The Teskey Brothers	Live at The Hammersmith Apollo	Mushroom Records	
15	Algee Smith	Love Lost	7 Scope	
18	Kanii	#Blue	Masked, Warner	
18	Natalie Bergman	My Home Is Not in This World	Third Man	
18	Nectar Woode	It's like I never left	Since '93	
18	Sofia Ly	Are You Bored Yet?	LiveHelpLive, Pulse, Concord	
22	Black Party	The Last Dance	Guin, Stem	
25	ELHAE	Lotus Ave	RBC, BMG	
25	Frida Touray	Homebody	E2, Edition	
25	Mabel	Mabel	Polydor	
25	Tasha Cobbs Leonard	Tasha	Motown, TeeLee	
25	Tyla	WWP	Fax, Epic	
25	Vedo	E•pit•o•me	New Wav	
30	Buddy Guy	Ain't Done with the Blues	RCA	
31	Wolfacejoeyy	Summer Songs	Self-released	

=== August ===
Day	Artist(s)	Album	Record label(s)	Entering chart position
1	Rexx Life Raj	In Rhythm	Empire	
8	Amaarae	Black Star	Golden Child, Interscope	
8	Bryson Tiller	The Vices	RCA	
8	Craig David	Commitment	Believe UK	Debuted at No. 10 on the UK Albums Chart
8	Iyla	Weeping Angel	Tomorrow, Astra Velum, Create	
8	Jenevieve	Crysalis	Interscope	
8	Kaash Paige	KaashMyChecks	Rostrum	
8	Sasha Keable	Act Right	Flight Club	
8	Various artists	Stax Revue: Live In '65!	Craft, Concord	
12	Najee	Under the Moon Over the Sky	Blue Horn	
15	Dijon	Baby	R&R, Warner	
15	Gregg Belisle-Chi	Slow Crawl: Performing the Music of Tim Berne	Intakt Records	
15	Liamani	Dear Little Me	Def Jam	
15	Mahalia	Luvergirl	Warner Music UK	
15	Maroon 5	Love Is Like	222, Interscope	Debuted at No. 36 on the Billboard 200
15	Tres Leches	The Smooth Sounds of Tres Leches, LHCC Mart Vol. 1	Brainfeeder	
22	Adam Blackstone	Humble Magic	Bassic Black Entertainment, Anderson, Empire	
22	Ciara	CiCi	Beauty Marks	
22	Dominic Fike	Rocket	Columbia	
22	Jae Stephens	Sellout II	Raedio, Def Jam	
22	Jon Batiste	Big Money	Verve, Interscope	
22	J.P.	Took A Turn	Roc Nation	
22	Kalan.FrFr	California Player	Roc Nation	
22	Leela James	2BHonest	Shesangz, BMG	
22	Mariah the Scientist	Hearts Sold Separately	Buckles Laboratories, Epic	Debuted at No. 11 on the Billboard 200
22	Nourished by Time	The Passionate Ones	XL	
22	Teyana Taylor	Escape Room	Def Jam Recordings	Debuted at No. 67 on the Billboard 200
22	Umi	People Stories	Epic	
28	Destin Conrad	Whimsy	AboveGround, Empire	
28	Kevin Ross	Love Uptempo: Max	Art Society Music Group, Empire	
28	Tiwa Savage	This One Is Personal	Everything Savage, Empire	
29	Blood Orange	Essex Honey	RCA	Debuted at No. 69 on the UK Albums Chart
29	Braxton Cook	Not Everyone Can Go	Nettwerk	
29	Kirby	Miss Black America	Self-released	
29	Maurice Brown	Betta Days	Self-released	
29	Spinall	Èkó Groove	TheCAPMusic, Epic	

=== September ===
Day	Artist(s)	Album	Record label(s)	Entering chart position
2	Kamauu	The Romantic Spirituals	Mméré Dané, Stem	
5	Avenoir	Mirage	Listen to the Kids	
5	Curtis Harding	Departures & Arrivals: Adventures Of Captain Curt	Anti-	
5	El Michels Affair	24 Hr Sports	Big Crown	
5	Elmiene	Heat the Streets	Def Jam, Polydor	
5	Fujii Kaze	Prema	Republic, Universal Sigma, Hehn	
5	Jabari	Ultra	Epic	
5	Justin Bieber	Swag II	ILH, Def Jam	
5	Steven Bamidele	The Crash!	Tru Thoughts	
5	Walter Trout	Sign of the Times	Mascot, Provogue	
8	Haechan	Taste	SM, Kakao	
10	Abir	The Game	Fez's Finest, Empire	
10	Ayoni	Isola	Def Jam	
12	4Batz	Still Shinin	BuVision	
12	Ali McGuirk	Watertop	Signature Sounds Recordings	
12	Keri Hilson	We Need To Talk: Drama	Audible Art Club, Create	
12	Peyton	Au	Stones Throw	
19	Bakar	Beastie	Forever and Ever	
19	Cktrl	Spirit	Sounds of Wonder, R&R	
19	Jordan Astra	Time Will Tell	Mind of a Genius	
19	Joy Crookes	Juniper	Insanity, Sony, Speakerbox	Debuted at No. 13 on the UK Albums Chart
19	Kendra Morris	Next	Karma Chief, Colemine	
19	Lola Young	I'm Only F**king Myself	Island	Debuted at No. 3 on the UK Albums Chart; Debuted at No. 68 on the Billboard 200
26	Anaiis	Devotion & the Black Divine	Dream Sequence, 5dB	
26	Ant Clemons	Happy 2 Be Here With You	Self-released	
26	Breez Kennedy	We All Need Love	Standard, Def Jam	
26	Doja Cat	Vie	Kemosabe, RCA	Debuted at No. 4 on the Billboard 200
26	Eric Bellinger	It All Makes Sense	All Wins	
26	Lady Wray	Cover Girl	Big Crown	
26	Mariah Carey	Here for It All	Gamma	Debuted at No. 7 on the Billboard 200
26	Olivia Dean	The Art of Loving	Capitol, Polydor	Debuted at No. 1 on the UK Albums Chart; Debuted at No. 8 on the Billboard 200
26	Rochelle Jordan	Through the Wall	Empire	

=== October ===
Day	Artist(s)	Album	Record label(s)	Entering chart position
2	Bryson Tiller	Solace	RCA	Debuted at No. 52 on the Billboard 200
3	Adekunle Gold	Fuji	Somtin Different, Believe UK	
3	Bee-B	Villain Origin Story	Vrse1, Create	
3	Boy Soda	Soulstar	Warner Music Australia	Debuted at No. 32 on the ARIA Charts
3	Jussie Smollett	Break Out	Music of Sound, Rowdy	
3	Kindred the Family Soul	Grandlife	Self-released	
3	Ledisi	For Dinah	Listen Back, Candid	
3	Say She She	Cut & Rewind	Drink sum wtr	
3	Trevor Jackson	I Love You	Born Art, UnitedMasters	
10	Amber Mark	Pretty Idea	Jasmine Music, PMR, Interscope	
10	Eric Benét	It's Christmas	JBR	
10	JayDon	Me, My Songs, and I	Zoo, Mega, Gamma	
10	Josh Levi	Hydraulic	Raedio, Atlantic	
10	Kaash Paige	2 Late To Be Toxic	Rostrum	
10	Kent Jamz	Fear	Epic	
10	Khalid	After the Sun Goes Down	Right Hand, RCA	Debuted at No. 136 on the Billboard 200
10	Lojay	XOXO	Koratori	
10	Niia	V	Candid	
10	Robert Finley	Hallelujah! Don't Let The Devil Fool Ya	Easy Eye	
10	Robert Glasper	Keys to the City Volume One	Loma Vista	
10	St. Paul & The Broken Bones	St. Paul & The Broken Bones	Oasis Pizza, Thirty Tigers	
10	Sy Ari da Kid	Sy Ari Not Sorry 2	No I In Team, Cinq	
10	The Soul of John Black	Soul Salvation	Big Slamm	
10	Tom Scott	Anitya	Years Gone By	
15	JMSN	...It's only about u if you think it is.	White Room	
17	Bryant Barnes	Solace	Mercury	
17	Isaiah Falls	Lucky You	Lvrs Only	
17	Ron E	Let Me Explain	MNRK	
17	Ruel	Kicking My Feet	Recess, Giant	Debuted at No. 6 on the ARIA Charts
17	Sudan Archives	The BPM	Stones Throw	
17	Suubi	Casa's Journal	Free Lunch, Warner	
17	Ty Dolla Sign	Tycoon	EZMNY, Atlantic	
17	Zeyne	Awda	MDLBeast, Scarab	
23	Miguel	Caos	ByStorm, RCA	
24	Antibalas	Hourglass	Daptone	
24	Cautious Clay	The Hours: Night	Fantasy	
24	Daniel Caesar	Son of Spergy	Hollace, Republic	Debuted at No. 4 on the Billboard 200
24	Dion	The Rock 'n' Roll Philosopher	Keeping The Blues Alive	
24	Halle	Love?... or Something Like It	Parkwood, Columbia	
24	Hannah Jadagu	Describe	Sub Pop	
24	Leon Thomas	Pholks	EZMNY, Motown	
24	Mon Laferte	Femme Fatale	Sony US Latin	
24	Monte Booker	Noise (Meaning)	EQT	
24	Nelly Moar	Love's Law	ADA Nordics	
24	Queen Naija	30.	Capitol	
24	Skylar Grey	Angel With Tattoos	Grey Songs	
24	Yazmin Lacey	Teal Dreams	AMF	
28	Bjrnck	A Girl Like Me	Geffen	
31	Ingratax	Fama De Ingrata	Room28	
31	Keiyaa	Hooke's Law	XL	
31	Makaya McCraven	Off the Record	International Anthem, Nonesuch, XL	
31	Sevdaliza	Heroina	Broke, Create	
31	Trevor Jackson	Goodbye	Born Art, UnitedMasters	

=== November ===
Day	Artist(s)	Album	Record label(s)	Entering chart position
3	Miyeon	My, Lover	Cube	
7	2BYG	The Yearbook	Waystar, Def Jam	
7	Blk Odyssey	Mood Control	Earthchild, Empire	
7	Faouzia	Film Noir	Self-released	
7	Flwr Chyld	InsydeOut	Raedio, Def Jam	
7	Jonathan Jeremiah	We Come Alive	PIAS Germany	
7	Ludmilla	Fragmentos	Self-released	
7	Mavis Staples	Sad and Beautiful World	Anti-	
7	Rum.gold	Is There Anybody Home Disc 2: Act of God	Independent	
7	Tamar Braxton	Heartbreak Retrograde	Platform	
12	Teedra Moses	Complex Simplicity (Reimagined)	Black Moses	
14	Celeste	Woman of Faces	Polydor	Debuted at No. 12 on the UK Albums Chart
14	FKA Twigs	Eusexua Afterglow	Young, Atlantic	
14	Gabriel Jacoby	Gutta Child	Bourne, Pulse, Concord	
14	Jae Stephens	Total Sellout	Raedio, Def Jam	
14	Jean Dawson	Rock A Bye Baby, Glimmer Of God	P+	
14	Lido	Digital Dust II	Self-released	
14	Mario	Mood Swings	New Citizen, Empire	
14	Nobu Woods	Chimera	2nd Estate, Warner	
14	Nonso Amadi	To Cry a Flood	Universal Music Canada	
14	Q Parker	Evolution of Romance, Vol. 1	Paramount Collective	
14	Sekou	In a World We Don't Belong (Pt. 1)	EMI	
14	Summer Walker	Finally Over It	LVRN, Interscope	Debuted at No. 2 on the Billboard 200
21	Lance Ferguson	Rare Groove Spectrum, Vol. 3	Tru Thoughts	
21	Odeal	The Fall That Saved Us	OVMBR, LVRN	
21	Roy Woods	Flower City Heartbreak	OVO	
21	Sabri	What I Feel Now	Nation of Victims, Empire	
21	Samm Henshaw	It Could Be Worse	Dorm Seven, AWAL	
21	Tems	Love Is a Kingdom	RCA, Since '93	
21	Tommy Richman	Worlds Apart*	ISO Supremacy, Pulse, Concord	
21	Trevor Jackson	I Love You, Goodbye (The Greatest Breakup Album of All Time)	Born Art, UnitedMasters	
28	Young Jonn	Blue Disco	Chocolate City	

=== December ===
Day	Artist(s)	Album	Record label(s)	Entering chart position
3	October London	For You, My Love	Death Row, Gamma	
9	Black Party	Last Call	Guin	
12	Fridayy	Everybody Got Somebody	Lost In Melody, Def Jam	
12	Tanerélle	The Burnout	Mama Saturn	
19	Masicka	Her Name Is Love	Def Jam	

== Highest-charting songs ==
=== United States ===
R&B songs from any year which charted in the 2025 Top 40 of the Billboard Hot 100
Song	Artist	Project	Peak position
"Daisies"	Justin Bieber	Swag	2
"Love Me Not"	Ravyn Lenae	Bird's Eye	5
"Mutt"	Leon Thomas	Mutt	6
"Anxiety"	Doechii	Alligator Bites Never Heal	9
"30 for 30"	SZA and Kendrick Lamar	Lana	10
"Cry for Me"	The Weeknd	Hurry Up Tomorrow	12
"Messy"	Lola Young	This Wasn't Meant for You Anyway	14
"It Depends"	Chris Brown featuring Bryson Tiller	Brown	16
"Go Baby"	Justin Bieber	Swag	18
"CN Tower"	PartyNextDoor and Drake	Some Sexy Songs 4 U	18
"Die Trying"	PartyNextDoor, Drake and Yebba	Some Sexy Songs 4 U	21
"All I Can Take"	Justin Bieber	Swag	21
"Burning Blue"	Mariah the Scientist	Hearts Sold Separately	25
"Something About You"	PartyNextDoor and Drake	Some Sexy Songs 4 U	26
"Somebody Loves Me"	PartyNextDoor, Drake and Cash Cobain	Some Sexy Songs 4 U	27
"Jealous Type"	Doja Cat	Vie	28
"Moth Balls"	PartyNextDoor and Drake	Some Sexy Songs 4 U	29
"BMF"	SZA	Lana	29
"Bad Dreams"	Teddy Swims	I've Tried Everything but Therapy (Part 2)	30
"Deeper"	PartyNextDoor	Some Sexy Songs 4 U	31
"Way It Is"	Justin Bieber and Gunna	Swag	33
"Things You Do"	Justin Bieber	Swag	35
"Spider-Man Superman"	PartyNextDoor and Drake	Some Sexy Songs 4 U	35
"Crying in Chanel"	Drake	Some Sexy Songs 4 U	37
"Walking Away"	Justin Bieber	Swag	37
"Dandelion"	Ariana Grande	Brighter Days Ahead	38
"Pixelated Kisses"	Joji	Piss in the Wind	38
"Residuals"	Chris Brown	11:11	40

=== United Kingdom ===
R&B songs from any year which charted in the 2025 Top 10 of the UK Singles Chart
Song	Artist	Project	Peak position
"Messy"	Lola Young	This Wasn't Meant for You Anyway	1
"Man I Need"	Olivia Dean	The Art of Loving	1
"Nice to Each Other"	Olivia Dean	The Art of Loving	4
"Die on This Hill"	Sienna Spiro	Visitor	9

== Highest first-week consumption ==
List of albums with the highest first-week consumption (sales + streaming + track equivalent), as of December 2025 in the United States
Number	Album	Artist	1st-week consumption	1st-week position	Refs
1	Hurry Up Tomorrow	The Weeknd	490,500	1	
2	Some Sexy Songs 4 U	PartyNextDoor & Drake	246,000	1	
3	Swag	Justin Bieber	163,000	2	
4	Finally Over It	Summer Walker	77,000	2	
5	Sincerely	Kali Uchis	62,000	2	
6	Vie	Doja Cat	57,000	4	
7	Ruby	Jennie	56,000	7	
8	I've Tried Everything but Therapy (Part 2)	Teddy Swims	50,000	4	
9	Here for It All	Mariah Carey	47,000	7	
10	Beloved	Giveon	44,000	8	

== All critically reviewed albums ranked ==
=== Metacritic ===
Number	Artist	Album	Average score	Number of reviews	Reference
1	Dijon	Baby	94	6 reviews	
2	Rochelle Jordan	Through the Wall	90	5 reviews	
3	Mavis Staples	Sad and Beautiful World	90	10 reviews	
4	Nourished by Time	The Passionate Ones	89	15 reviews	
5	Blood Orange	Essex Honey	89	13 reviews	
6	Annie and the Caldwells	Can't Lose My (Soul)	88	6 reviews	
7	St. Paul & The Broken Bones	St. Paul & The Broken Bones	88	4 reviews	
8	Valerie June	Owls, Omens and Oracles	87	7 reviews	
9	Yaya Bey	Do It Afraid	85	7 reviews	
10	Olivia Dean	The Art of Loving	84	10 reviews	
11	Joy Crookes	Juniper	84	4 reviews	
12	Sault	10	84	4 reviews	
13	Amaarae	Black Star	83	9 reviews	
14	Kali Uchis	Sincerely	83	7 reviews	
15	Erika de Casier	Lifetime	83	5 reviews	
16	Witch	Sogolo	82	7 reviews	
17	Cymande	Renascence	82	5 reviews	
18	Eddie Chacon	Lay Low	82	5 reviews	
19	Sudan Archives	The BPM	81	14 reviews	
20	Keiyaa	Hooke's Law	81	8 reviews	
21	Lola Young	I'm Only F**king Myself	79	10 reviews	
22	Dion	The Rock 'n' Roll Philosopher	79	4 reviews	
23	Celeste	Woman of Faces	78	7 reviews	
24	Kokoroko	Tuff Times Never Last	78	7 reviews	
25	Doja Cat	Vie	78	6 reviews	
26	Antibalas	Hourglass	78	4 reviews	
27	Curtis Harding	Departures & Arrivals: Adventures Of Captain Curt	78	4 reviews	
28	Quinton Barnes	Black Noise	78	4 reviews	
29	Mac Miller	Balloonerism	77	10 reviews	
30	Greentea Peng	Tell Dem It's Sunny	77	7 reviews	
31	Teyana Taylor	Escape Room	77	4 reviews	
32	Nao	Jupiter	76	7 reviews	
33	Summer Walker	Finally Over It	75	6 reviews	
34	Jennie	Ruby	74	6 reviews	
35	Everything Is Recorded	Temporary	74	4 reviews	
36	The Weeknd	Hurry Up Tomorrow	73	12 reviews	
37	Mariah Carey	Here for It All	73	8 reviews	
38	Hope Tala	Hope Handwritten	72	4 reviews	
39	Banks	Off with Her Head	71	6 reviews	
40	Teddy Swims	I've Tried Everything but Therapy (Part 2)	70	6 reviews	
41	Justin Bieber	Swag	67	15 reviews	
42	Miguel	Caos	65	4 reviews	
43	Daniel Caesar	Son of Spergy	61	4 reviews	
44	PartyNextDoor & Drake	Some Sexy Songs 4 U	55	5 reviews	
45	Justin Bieber	Swag II	48	5 reviews	

== See also ==
- Previous article: 2024 in rhythm and blues
- Next article: 2026 in rhythm and blues
