= Blue May =

British music producer, songwriter, and creative director

- Born: 1986 (age 39–40)
- Occupations: Producer; songwriter; musician; mixer; programmer; creative director
- Instruments: Guitar; bass; piano; keyboards; drums
- Publisher: BMG Music Publishing
- Awards: MOBO Award for Best Album; Mercury Prize (4 nominations)

Blue May (born 1986) is a British music producer, songwriter, musician, mixing engineer, programmer and creative director. Based in Los Angeles, he has collaborated with artists including Lily Allen, Kano, Joy Crookes, Suki Waterhouse, and Jorja Smith.

In 2016 May received the MOBO Award for Best Album for Kano's Made in the Manor, which was also nominated for the Mercury Prize. He was again shortlisted for the Mercury Prize in 2020 (for Kano's Hoodies All Summer); 2022 (for the Crookes album, Skin); and 2024 (for the Ghetts album On Purpose, with Purpose).

== Early life and education ==
May was born in Wales and raised in London. He was exposed to a wide range of music as a child and grew up listening to David Bowie, Gipsy Kings, Al Green, Jimi Hendrix, Nina Simone, Nirvana, and Prince, among others. He began playing the guitar when he was 10. He attended the BRIT School, where he played with Tawiah and Jodi Milliner, who later became frequent collaborators.

== Career ==
May began his career in production in his early 20s and produced his first major label artist in 2009. In a 2025 interview with Variety he said "I didn’t know how to hold the pressure of A&R people and the manager and still represent the artist. it was a complete failure." He subsequently discovered the importance of "shutting out the noise of the music industry" and in part designed XXVII, his first large studio, to do so. He won the MOBO Award for Best Album and received four Mercury Prize nominations between 2016 and 2024.

May first worked with Lily Allen as the creative director for her 2018 tour. In December 2024, Allen and May began working on Allen's fifth album, West End Girl, with a team of writers, producers, and players that May and co-executive producer Kito put together. It was written and recorded in 16 days at his home studio in the Hollywood Hills. May co-executive produced, produced, mixed and co-wrote all of West End Girl's 14 songs. Released in October 2025, the album, which documents the collapse of Allen's marriage, received widespread critical acclaim. A five-star review by Hannah Ewens in The Independent was headlined ''West End Girl: A Brutal, Tell-all Masterpiece"; Chris Willman described it as "deliriously brilliant pop" in Variety; and The Guardian's Alexis Petridis praised "the striking prettiness of its tunes" and the "boldness and quality of its songwriting."

== Personal life ==
May lives in the Hollywood Hills. He has a pitbull, Moobi.

== Selected discography ==
Year	Artist	Title	Album/EP	Song(s)	Songwriter	Credit	Notes
2014	Kindness	Otherness	check			Engineer, mixer	
2016	Claire Maguire	Stranger Things Have Happened	check		check	Executive producer, producer, mixer	
2016	Kano	Made in the Manor	check		check	Producer, mixer	Mercury Prize nomination; Best Album MOBO, Best Album
2017	Suki Waterhouse	"Brutally"		check	check	Producer, mixer	Waterhouse's first release
2018	Leon Vynehall	Nothing Is Still	check			Engineer, mixer	
2019	Kano	Hoodies All Summer	check		check	Executive producer, producer, mixer	Mercury Prize nomination
2019	Africa Express	Egoli	check		check	Producer, mixer	Non-profit South African music collective founded by Damon Albarn; Egoli features Moonchild Sanelly and Radio 123
2020	Yellow Days	"A Day in a Yellow Beat"	check			Producer, Mixer	
2021	Joy Crookes	Skin	check			Executive producer, producer, mixer	Mercury Prize nomination, Album of the Year
2022	Sudan Archives	Natural Brown Prom Queen	check			Mixer	
2022	Suki Waterhouse	Milk Teeth	check		check	Producer, mixer	EP
2023	Jorja Smith	"What If My Heart Beats Faster?"		check	check	Producer	
2024	Ghetts	On Purpose, with Purpose	check			Mixer	Mercury Prize nomination
2024	Suki Waterhouse	Memoir of a Sparklemuffin	check		check	Producer, mixer	
2025	Joy Crookes	Juniper	check		check	Executive producer, producer, mixer	
2025	Lily Allen	West End Girl	check		check	Executive producer, producer, mixer	
