= Skin (Joy Crookes album) =

Studio album by Joy Crookes
- Released: 15 October 2021
- Genre: Soul jazz; R&B; pop; neo soul
- Length: 42:44
- Label: Sony; Insanity; Speakerbox
- Producer: Barney Lister; Blue May; Eg White; Jonny Lattimer; Joy Crookes; Sam Beste; Tev'n

Joy Crookes chronology
Perception (2019)	Skin (2021)	Juniper (2025)

Singles from Skin
- 1. "Feet Don't Fail Me Now" Released: 19 June 2021; 2. "Skin" Released: 6 August 2021; 3. "When You Were Mine" Released: 25 August 2021; 4. "Trouble" Released: 12 October 2021; 5. "19th Floor" Released: 3 February 2022

Skin is the debut studio album by British singer-songwriter Joy Crookes, released through Insanity Records on 15 October 2021. The album has spawned four singles, including "Feet Don't Fail Me Now" and "When You Were Mine", both of which reached number one on the UK Asian Top 40 chart. The album was nominated for the 2022 Mercury Prize.

Primarily a modern soul-jazz record led by orchestral string arrangements, Skin is an "autobiographical body of work" inspired by Crookes' heritage and identity, as well as her experiences of young adulthood and heartbreak. The album was met with widespread acclaim upon release, with critics praising the subject matter, production and Crookes' vocal performance.

== Background and release ==
At the 2020 Brit Awards, Joy Crookes was nominated for the Rising Star Award, which predicts the biggest upcoming British musicians. In September of that year, she gained moderate mainstream attention with the release of her cover version of The Wannadies' 1994 single "You & Me Song", which was featured in an O2 TV advertisement, consequently entering both the UK Singles Downloads and the UK Singles Sales charts. In June 2021, Crookes released the single "Feet Don't Fail Me Now" and its accompanying music video. The track debuted atop the UK Asian Music Top 40 chart, while the music video was nominated for Best Pop Video - UK, Best Wardrobe Styling in a Video and Best Hair & Makeup in a Video at the 2021 UK Music Video Awards.

In August 2021, Crookes announced the release of Skin, and released its title track alongside a music video as the second single. "When You Were Mine" was released later that month as the third single and reached number one on the UK Asian Top 40. Its accompanying music video was released in early October 2021. "Trouble" was released as the fourth single on 13 October 2021, two days before the release of the album.

== Composition and lyrics ==
Described by Clash as "orchestral soul-jazz", Skin is primarily a modern soul record with elements of R&B, jazz, pop, neo-soul and trip-hop, and is characterized by its orchestral string arrangements. There are also a number of piano ballads on the album. Inspired largely by her own British-Irish-Bangladeshi heritage, Crookes lyrically explores themes of young adulthood, heartbreak, and identity. In a post on social media, Crookes wrote "This is the proudest work I have made to date. It is an autobiographical body of work, the album consists of songs I wrote when I was 15 up until 22. This is an album about my identity."

== Critical reception ==
Professional ratings
Aggregate scores
Source	Rating
Metacritic	89/100
Review scores
Source	Rating
Clash	9/10
DIY	5/5 stars
Gigwise	8/10 stars
The Guardian	4/5 stars
NME	4/5 stars
The Times	4/5 stars

Skin received widespread acclaim in reviews from contemporary music critics upon release. At Metacritic, which assigns a normalised rating out of 100 to reviews from professional publications, the album has an average score of 89, based on 4 reviews.

DIY rated the album five out of five stars and described it as "a rich, varied and considered body of work [...] worthy of elevating the singer into the realm of Britain's classiest chart-bothering talents", noting that it "does everything a debut should, dipping into multiple pools but uniting them all with a consistent outlook and a clear voice." Apart from praising its sociopolitical subject matter, Alim Kheraj of The Guardian described the record as "vibrant, urgent and brimming with life", and wrote that "if the point of a debut album is getting to know an artist, then Skin is a masterclass." Writing for NME, Sophie Williams noted that it "rises from the most intimate pockets of Crookes's life: the emotional turmoil around growing up, heartbreak, forgiveness, and relationships that don't offer the sanctuary they promise." In a review for Clash, Hannah Browne described Skin as "a candid, soulful exploration of identity" with "13 smooth jams [that] showcase Joy Crookes not only as a vocalist or candid writer but as the new face of British soul."

Blessed with the kind of earthy, jazzy vocals that immediately ground her songs with brevity and presence, [Crookes] communicates a community's worth of life lessons in thirteen songs. Stapled together with catchy piano riffs, brassy interjections and soaring string sections, Skin proves Crookes a competent producer, singer, songwriter, and overall artist. [...] She's established a strong musical identity, an introspective yet witty voice, and some important messages.

— Alex Rigotti in a review of Skin for Gigwise

== Track listing ==
Skin track listing
No.	Title	Writer(s)	Producer(s)	Length
1.	"I Don't Mind"	Joy Crookes; Harvey Grant	Crookes; Blue May^{[a]}	2:54
2.	"19th Floor"	Crookes; Jonny Lattimer; Ajat Buattacharya	Blue May; Leon Vynehall^{[a]}; Tev'n^{[a]}	3:09
3.	"Poison"	Crookes	Blue May; Sam Beste	3:31
4.	"Trouble"	Crookes; Lattimer; Barney Lister	Blue May; Lister; Tev'n^{[a]}	3:04
5.	"When You Were Mine"	Crookes; Lattimer; Francis White	Blue May; Lattimer; Eg White	3:23
6.	"To Lose Someone"	Crookes; Amy Langley; Audra Mae; Jamie Keeney; Blue May	Blue May	4:10
7.	"Unlearn You"	Crookes; Glen Roberts; Lattimer	Blue May; Lattimer	2:42
8.	"Kingdom"	Crookes; Roberts; June Miles-Kingston; Romana Carlier; Jane Crockford; Kate Corris	Blue May; Crookes; Tev'n	3:08
9.	"Feet Don't Fail Me Now"	Crookes; Joel Pott; Lister	Blue May; Lister; Tev'n^{[a]}	3:18
10.	"Wild Jasmine"	Crookes; J. Warner; Ari PenSmith; Alexander Blake	Blue May; Tevn^{[a]}	3:35
11.	"Skin"	Crookes; Daniel Boyle; Matt Maltese	Blue May	2:58
12.	"Power"	Crookes; Mae; Alex Hope; Ntuthuko Nhlumayo	Blue May; Beste; Tev'n	4:42
13.	"Theek Ache"	Crookes; Lattimer; Bhattacharya	Blue May; Tev'n	2:10
Total length:				42:44

=== Note ===
- ^{^[a]} indicates an additional producer

== Personnel ==
Credits adapted from Tidal.

=== Musicians ===
- Joy Crookes – vocals (all tracks), background vocals (tracks 1, 3–5, 8, 9), programming (1, 8), clapping (5), synthesizer (8), piano (13)
- Harvey Grant – saxophone (1)
- Tobie Tripp – strings (1)
- Blue May – programming (2–4, 8, 9, 12, 13), synthesizer (2, 10, 12), clapping (3–5, 8, 9); electric guitar, percussion (3, 9); acoustic guitar (3); guitar, marimba (5); bass (6, 12), timpani (8)
- Tom Skinner – drums (2–6, 8–10); clapping, percussion (10)
- Tev'n – programming (2, 4, 8–10, 12), piano (2, 9), background vocals (8, 9, 12), synthesizer (10, 12)
- Amy Langley – performance arrangement (2, 5, 6, 7, 9, 11), cello (5, 6, 9)
- Ben Rogerson – cello (2, 7, 11)
- Jess Cox – cello (2, 7, 11)
- Klara Schumann – cello (2, 7, 11)
- Llinos Richards – cello (2, 7, 11)
- Ellie Stanford – violin (2, 5, 7, 9, 11)
- Gita Langley – violin (2, 5, 7, 9, 11)
- Jessie Murphy – violin (2, 5, 7, 9, 11)
- Kotono Sato – violin (2, 5, 7, 9, 11)
- Clifton Harrison – viola (2, 7, 11)
- Emma Owens – viola (2, 7, 11)
- Jong on Okki Lau – viola (2, 7, 11)
- Jordan Bergmans – viola (2, 7, 11)
- Ciara Ismail – violin (2, 7, 11)
- Glesni Roberts – violin (2, 7, 11)
- Kate Robinson – violin (2, 7, 11)
- Marianne Haynes – violin (2, 7, 11)
- Paloma Deike – violin (2, 7, 11)
- Sarah Sexton – violin (2, 7, 11)
- Leon Vynehall – programming, synthesizer (2)
- Rob Mullarkey – bass (3–5, 8), guitar (8)
- Sam Beste – piano (3, 6, 12), synthesizer (3, 12), organ (6)
- LaDonna Harley-Peters – choir vocals (3, 12)
- Sherelle Mckenzie – choir vocals (3, 12)
- Vula Malinga – choir vocals (3, 12)
- Jonny Lattimer – electric guitar (4); background vocals, clapping (5)
- Barney Lister – programming, synthesizer (4); background vocals (9)
- Theon Cross – tuba (4)
- Reuben James – piano (5, 7)
- Amy Stanford – viola (5, 9)
- Eg White – background vocals, clapping, glockenspiel, organ, piano (5)
- Nathaniel Cross – performance arrangement, trombone (5)
- Chelsea Carmichael – baritone saxophone (5)
- Richie Harrison – tenor saxophone (5)
- Yelfris Valdés – trumpet (5)
- Dayna Fisher – bass (9)
- Jalen Ngonda – vocals (9)
- J. Warner – background vocals (10)
- Dave Okumu – clapping, electric guitar (10)

=== Technical and visuals ===
- Blue May – mixing (1, 3, 6, 12), engineering (2–13)
- Mark Stent – mixing (2, 4, 5, 7–11)
- Simon Francis – mastering
- Joy Crookes – engineering (1, 7), creative direction
- Harvey Grant – engineering (1)
- George Chung – engineering (2–6, 8–12)
- Lewis Jones – engineering (2, 7, 11)
- Eg White – engineering (5)
- Jonny Lattimer – engineering (7)
- Mat Maitland – creative direction, design, collage
- Carlota Guerrero – creative direction, photography

== Charts ==
Chart performance for Skin
Chart (2021)	Peak position
Belgian Albums (Ultratop Wallonia)	99
French Albums (SNEP)	114
German Albums (Offizielle Top 100)	41
Irish Albums (OCC)	26
Scottish Albums (OCC)	10
Swiss Albums (Schweizer Hitparade)	47
UK Albums (OCC)	5
