= Wait Til I Get Over =

Studio album by Durand Jones
- Released: May 5, 2023
- Genre: Gospel-soul
- Length: 41:07
- Label: Dead Oceans
- Producers: Durand Jones; Ben Lumsdaine; Drake Ritter

Durand Jones chronology
Private Space (2021)	Wait Til I Get Over (2023)

Wait Til I Get Over is the first solo studio album by American musician Durand Jones, released on May 5, 2023, through Dead Oceans. It follows three albums by Jones as the singer of the group Durand Jones & The Indications, and is themed around his hometown in Louisiana. The album received acclaim from critics and charted in the top 40 in Scotland.

== Background ==
The album is themed around Jones's hometown, Hillaryville, Louisiana, which he describes in the interlude "The Place You'd Most Want to Live" as being "founded by eight slaves who received it as a form of reparations after the American Civil War".

== Critical reception ==
Professional ratings
Aggregate scores
Source	Rating
Metacritic	88/100
Review scores
Source	Rating
AllMusic	4/5 stars
Classic Rock	4.5/5 stars
Mojo	4/5 stars
NME	5/5 stars
PopMatters	9/10
Uncut	8/10

Wait Til I Get Over received a score of 88 out of 100 on review aggregator Metacritic based on seven critics' reviews, indicating "universal acclaim". Andy Kellman of AllMusic wrote that "seemingly posed as a promise and a threat, Wait Til I Get Over is a striking and poignant deviation" and called it "a composite of live takes and intensive sonic processing and goes in a number of creative directions". Uncut felt that "the concept is implicit in the music's gospel-soul communion, the lyrics' yearning and reckoning, and the rousing, towering power of Jones' purposively nostalgic soul vocal", while Classic Rock remarked that it is "simply stunning". Mojo's Tom Doyle found that Jones "return[s] to a soul sound that veers from the ambient to the gritty" and described it as "multifaceted and consistently brilliant".

Thomas Smith of NME awarded it five out of five stars and described it as "gritty but glorious, too. The tenderness of his work with the Indications is somewhat on hold, and we get a rawer Jones as he details the Southern Black experience". Smith felt it will "please newcomers and existing fans alike, but, given the backstory and heart poured into [it], the record existing for Jones feels like a triumph". Glide Magazine's Ryan Dillon stated that Jones "uses nuanced musicianship and unconventional song structures to achieve the colorful imagery that makes his solo debut so layered" and summarized it as "as conceptually ambitious as it is sonically". Reviewing the album for PopMatters, Peter Piatkowski opined that it is "a fabulous record that recalls masterful works by Marvin Gaye, Stevie Wonder, and Bill Withers. Braiding stirring songwriting prowess, sparkling production, and beautiful vocals, Jones has created one of the most assured and brightest debut albums in quite some time".

== Track listing ==
Wait Til I Get Over track listing
No.	Title	Length
1.	"Gerri Marie"	2:45
2.	"The Place You'd Most Want to Live (Interlude)"	1:09
3.	"Lord Have Mercy"	4:01
4.	"Sadie"	2:56
5.	"I Want You"	4:04
6.	"Wait Til I Get Over"	3:01
7.	"That Feeling"	4:22
8.	"See It Through (Interlude)"	1:24
9.	"See It Through"	3:24
10.	"Someday We'll All Be Free"	4:03
11.	"Letter to My 17 Year Old Self"	5:47
12.	"Secrets"	4:11
Total length:		41:07

== Charts ==
Chart performance for Wait Til I Get Over
Chart (2023)	Peak position
Scottish Albums (Official Charts)	32
UK Album Downloads (Official Charts)	90
UK Independent Albums (Official Charts)	11
