= Barney Lister =

English musician

- Born: John Barnabas Greenwell Lister; 2 December 1993 (age 32); Huddersfield, England
- Genres: Soul; Indie; RnB; Pop; HipHop
- Occupations: Record producer; Songwriter; Multi-instrumentalist
- Label: Dead Oceans
- Website: mrcyband.com

Barney Lister (born 2 December 1993) is a multi-instrumentalist, producer, and songwriter hailing from Huddersfield, known for his eclectic production style and soulful sound. Lister has gained recognition through collaborations with artists including Jessie Ware, Obongjayar, Olivia Dean, Giggs, Joesef, Fred again, Joy Crookes, Yazmin Lacey, Guy Garvey, Rina Sawayama, and Celeste.

Lister is one half of the duo MRCY, alongside South London vocalist Kojo Degraft-Johnson. The duo released their debut project, VOLUME 1, on May 10, 2024. MRCY were named as ‘ones to watch’ in 2025 by the likes of Rolling Stone UK and DIY Magazine. They also won ‘Best Independent EP/Mixtape’ at the AIM Independent Music Awards that same year.

In 2024 MRCY supported Grammy nominated band Black Pumas as the opening act on their UK and European tour, and they also supported Durand Jones & The Indications in February 2026. MRCY are signed to record label Dead Oceans.

In 2023, Barney received a nomination for the prestigious Ivor Novello Awards for his work on Obongjayar’s album "Some Nights I Dream of Doors" which was nominated for Best Album. This recognition follows his previous success with Obongjayar, where their collaboration on "God’s Own Children" won the award for Best Song in 2021. He was also nominated in 2024 for an Ivor for Best Contemporary song for “Mama’s Eyes” by Mette.
