= Glassworks (composition) =

1981 chamber music work by Philip Glass

- by Philip Glass
- Style: Postmodern, minimalist, systems music
- Form: Chamber music
- Composed: 1981
- Publisher: Dunvagen Music Publishers
- Recorded: 1982, studio recording for Sony Classical Records

Glassworks is a chamber music work of six movements by Philip Glass. Following his larger-scale concert and stage works, it was Glass's successful attempt to create a more pop-oriented "Walkman-suitable" work, with considerably shorter and more accessible pieces written for the recording studio.

The LP and cassette were released in 1982, each with its own separate mix: the record album intended for home listening and the tape for personal cassette players. The headphone-specific mix, previously only available on cassette, was reissued digitally 2016.

Glassworks was intended to introduce my music to a more general audience than had been familiar with it up to then.

— Philip Glass

== Movements ==
1. "Opening" (piano, with horn at end) 6:24
2. "Floe" (2 flutes, 2 soprano saxophones, 2 tenor saxophones, 2 horns, synthesizer) 5:59
3. "Islands" (2 flutes, 2 soprano saxophones, tenor saxophone, bass clarinet, 2 horns, viola, violoncello, synthesizer) 7:39
4. "Rubric" (2 flutes, 2 soprano saxophones, 2 tenor saxophones, 2 horns, synthesizer) 6:04
5. "Façades" (2 soprano saxophones, synthesizer, viola, violoncello) 7:20
  This movement has its origins in the film score Koyaanisqatsi, but was ultimately not used in the film; it is often performed as a work in its own right (ISWC T-010.461.089-0).
6. "Closing" (flute, clarinet, bass clarinet, horn, viola, violoncello, piano) 6:03
  A reprise of "Opening".

=== "Opening" ===
"Opening" uses triplet eighth notes, over duple eighth notes, over whole notes in 4/4. Formally it consists of three groups of four measure phrases of three to four chords repeated four times each, ABC:||ABC, which then merges with the next movement, "Floe" with the entrance of the horns.

=== "Floe" ===
There are two formulaically identical sections to the movement. Although rhythmically driven, the melodic implications of "Floe" occur somewhat coincidentally by orchestration. There is no modulation, but the harmonic progression simply repeats over and over again. The layering of contrasting timbres is characteristic of the piece as a whole. Floe borrows a theme from Jean Sibelius's fifth symphony.

== In popular culture ==
"Rubric" and "Façades" both appeared in the 2008 documentary about Philippe Petit, Man on Wire. "Floe" was featured on the soundtrack of the 1989 Italian horror film The Church. "Opening" was featured in the American remake of the movie Breathless. The piano introduction of the Celeste song "People Always Change" from her 2025 album Woman of Faces has been noted to closely resemble "Opening".

== Release and reception ==
Professional ratings
Review scores
Source	Rating
AllMusic	4.5/5 stars
Pitchfork	9.5/10

The album was commercially successful, introduced Glass's music to a large audience, and gave Glass widespread name recognition.
