= Ish (film) =

British drama film

- Theatrical release poster
- Directed by: Imran Perretta
- Screenplay by: Imran Perretta; Enda Walsh
- Produced by: Dhiraj Mahey; Bennett McGhee
- Starring: Farhan Hasnat; Yahya Kitana; Sudha Bhuchar
- Cinematography: Jermaine Canute Edwards
- Edited by: Adam Biskupski
- Music by: Imran Perretta
- Production companies: BBC Film; Primal Pictures; Good Chaos; Home Team; Calculus Media
- Distributed by: British Film Institute (United Kingdom); Watermelon Pictures (United States)
- Release dates: 30 August 2025 (Venice); 31 July 2026 (United Kingdom)
- Running time: 87 minutes
- Countries: United Kingdom; United States
- Language: English

Ish is a 2025 drama film directed by Imran Perretta, co-written by Perretta and Enda Walsh, starring Farhan Hasnat, Yahya Kitana and Sudha Bhuchar.

The film had its world premiere at the Critics' Week section of the 82nd Venice International Film Festival on 30 August 2025, where it won the section's People's Choice Award.

== Synopsis ==
"Two best friends face the end of childhood when racial profiling and a traumatic police stop-and-search tear them apart, teaching Ish about letting go in a society where brown boys are constantly watched."

== Cast ==
- Farhan Hasnat as Ish
- Yahya Kitana as Maram
- Sudha Bhuchar as Nanu
- Avin Shah as Naeem
- Joy Crookes as Samira

== Production ==
The film marks the feature film directorial debut of Imran Perretta, and is written by Perretta with Enda Walsh and filmed with cinematographer Jermaine Canute Edwards. the film is a joint production between the United Kingdom and United States with production from Primal Pictures, Good Chaos and Home Team, alongside BBC Film, the British Film Institute, Calculus Media and Out of Order Studios. The film was produced for Primal Pictures by Dhiraj Mahey.

The cast is led by Farhan Hasnat as the eponymous Ish, with Yahya Kitana, Sudha Bhuchar, Avin Shah and Joy Crookes. Hasnat and Kitana had known each other since early childhood, which contributed to the director's decision to cast them.

== Release ==
The film was screened at the 82nd Venice International Film Festival on 30 August 2025, as part of the International Film Critics' Week. It was shown on 15 October at the 2025 BFI London Film Festival. Ish is scheduled for general release in the UK and Ireland on 31 July 2026.

== Reception ==
Peter Bradshaw in The Guardian gave the film four stars and described it as a "complex, compassionate drama". Kevin Maher in The Times also awarded the film four stars and praised "sublime" directional touches on debut from Imran Perretta which produced a "sensitive film about the nurturing power of family, the nourishing value of tradition and the toxicity of violence".

== Accolades ==
The film won the audience award at the Venice Critics' Week at the 2025 Venice Film Festival.

Dhiraj Mahey was nominated for breakthrough producer and Nina Hartstone, Jake Whitelee, Jens Petersen, Mike Tehrani and Rob Davidson were nominated for best sound at the British Independent Film Awards 2025. For their roles in the film, Farhan Hasnat and Yahya Kitana were long-listed for the British Independent Film Award for Breakthrough Performance.
