= Juniper (Joy Crookes album) =

Studio album by Joy Crookes
- Released: 19 September 2025
- Genres: Jazz; R&B; pop
- Length: 41:17
- Labels: Sony; Insanity; Speakerbox
- Producers: Chrome Sparks; Joy Crookes; Harvey Grant; Blue May

Joy Crookes chronology
Skin (2021)	Juniper (2025)

Singles from Juniper
- 1. "Pass the Salt" Released: 10 January 2025; 2. "Mathematic" Released: 5 February 2025; 3. "I Know You'd Kill" Released: 20 March 2025; 4. "Carmen" Released: 16 May 2025; 5. "Perfect Crime" Released: 18 June 2025; 6. "Somebody To You" Released: 13 August 2025

Juniper is the second studio album by British singer-songwriter Joy Crookes, released through Insanity Records on 19 September 2025, and follows her 2021 critically acclaimed debut Skin.

== Critical reception ==
Professional ratings
Aggregate scores
Source	Rating
Metacritic	84/100
Review scores
Source	Rating
Clash Music	8/10
DIY	4/5 stars
The Guardian	4/5 stars
The Line of Best Fit	8/10

According to the review aggregator Metacritic, Juniper received "universal acclaim" based on a weighted average score of 84 out of 100 from 4 critic scores. Ife Lawrence of DIY hailed Juniper as "a testament to Joy's inner strength," blending R&B, soul, and jazz to explore topics including queer love and mental health. Alexis Petridis of The Guardian praised the album as "an impressively fresh and individual take on the familiar" with songs that have "have big choruses and strong melodies".

Writing for Clash, Rachel Min Leong praised Juniper as "playful, exploratory and incredibly clever record." Lana Williams of The Line of Best Fit wrote that Crookes "laying her soul bare."

== Track listing ==
Juniper track listing
No.	Title	Writer(s)	Producer(s)	Length
1.	"Brave"	Joy Crookes; Nathan Allen; Sam Beste; Alex Bonfanti; Graham Godfrey; Blue May; Steve Pringle; Junior Williams	May	3:54
2.	"Pass the Salt" (featuring Vince Staples)	Crookes; Jonny Lattimer; Barney Lister; Vince Staples	May; Harvey Grant^{[a]}	2:47
3.	"Carmen"	Crookes; Elton John; Lattimer; Bernie Taupin	May; Crookes	3:02
4.	"Perfect Crime"	Crookes; Lattimer; Ntuthuko Nhlumayo	Crookes; Grant; May^{[a]}; Emil Labri^{[a]}; Ricky Damian^{[a]}; Tev'n^{[a]}	2:32
5.	"Mathematics" (featuring Kano)	Crookes; Beste; Lister; Matt Maltese; Kane Robinson	May	3:18
6.	"House with a Pool"	Crookes; Beste; Lattimer; Lister	May; Tev'n^{[a]}	3:29
7.	"I Know You'd Kill"	Crookes; Lister; Joel Pott	May; Crookes	2:54
8.	"First Last Dance"	Crookes; Lattimer; Nhlumayo	May; Crookes; Chrome Sparks; Tev'n^{[a]}	3:20
9.	"Mother"	Crookes; Beste; Lister; Pott	May	3:29
10.	"Somebody to You"	Crookes; Lattimer; Lister	May; Crookes; Grant^{[a]}; Chrome Sparks^{[a]}	2:57
11.	"Forever"	Crookes; Nathaniel Ledwidge	May; Crookes; Grant; Tev'n^{[a]}	3:17
12.	"Paris"	Crookes; Beste; Lister; Pott	May; Bonfanti^{[m]}	6:18
Total length:				41:17

=== Notes ===
- ^{^[a]} indicates an additional producer
- ^{^[m]} indicates a miscellaneous producer
- "Carmen" credits Elton John and Bernie Taupin as writers due to the song "unintentionally channelling 'Bennie and the Jets'".

== Personnel ==
Credits adapted from Tidal.

=== Musicians ===
- Joy Crookes – lead vocals (all tracks), organ (track 2), background vocals (3, 4, 6–9, 11, 12), guitar (4)
- Alex Bonfanti – bass (1–7, 9, 12), piano (7)
- Nathan Allen – drums (1–3, 5, 6, 8, 9, 12)
- Blue May – programming (1, 2, 6, 8, 11), synthesizer (1, 3, 6); bass, electric guitar (6, 8); percussion (7); acoustic guitar, keyboards (8); bass synthesizer (11)
- Sam Beste – piano (1, 3, 5, 6, 9, 12)
- Amy Langley – arrangement, music direction (1, 3, 5, 9)
- Klara Romac – cello (1, 3, 5, 9)
- Rachel Lander – cello (1, 3, 5, 9)
- Amy Stanford – viola (1, 3, 5, 9)
- Jo Galtin – viola (1, 3, 5, 9)
- Marianne Haynes – viola (1, 3, 9), violin (5)
- Blaize Henry – violin (1, 3, 5, 9)
- Ellie Stanford – violin (1, 3, 5, 9)
- Elodie Chousmer-Howelles – violin (1, 3, 5, 9)
- Gita Langley – violin (1, 3, 5, 9)
- James Douglas – violin (1, 3, 5, 9)
- Jessie Murphy – violin (1, 3, 5, 9)
- Kotono Sato – violin (1, 3, 5, 9)
- Philippa Mo – violin (1, 3, 5, 9)
- Rosie Langley – violin (1, 3, 5, 9)
- Sarah Daramy-Williams – violin (1, 3, 5, 9)
- Sarah Sexton – violin (1, 3, 5, 9)
- Steve Pringle – Hammond organ (1, 6), synthesizer (3, 9), timpani (3); keyboards, programming (9); Mellotron, Rhodes piano (12)
- Junior Williams – background vocals (1)
- Graham Godfrey – percussion (1)
- Oli Savill – percussion (2, 3, 5, 6, 8, 9, 12)
- Harvey Dweller – synthesizer (2)
- Vince Staples – vocals (2)
- Kai Kwasi – background vocals (3, 7)
- Jonny Lattimer – whistles (4); guitar, piano (6)
- Harvey Grant – synthesizer (4, 11), piano (11)
- Rob Bisel – bass, guitar (4)
- Jacob Allen – guitar (4)
- Emil Larbi – percussion (4)
- Kano – vocals (5)
- Tev'n – background vocals, programming, synthesizer (6)
- Chrissy Barker – background vocals (7)
- Kenzie Bryant – background vocals (7)
- Moya Garrison-Msingwana – background vocals (7)
- Frank Walden – brass (7)
- Henry Collins – brass (7)
- Alexis Nuñez – drums (7)
- Marcus Bonfanti – guitar (7)
- Jeremy Malvin – bass, bass synthesizer, electric guitar, programming, synthesizer (8)
- Haich Ber Na – background vocals (8)
- Barney Lister – programming (12)

=== Technical ===
- Blue May – mixing (all tracks), engineering (1–3, 6–12)
- Matt Colton – mastering
- Ricky Damian – engineering (4)
- Scott Knapper – engineering (7)
- George Chung – engineering assistance (1–3, 6, 8, 10–12)
- Ishaan Nimkar – engineering assistance (3, 4, 6, 8, 10)
- Chris Bolster – engineering assistance (3)
- Giancomo Vianello – engineering assistance (8)

== Charts ==
Chart (2025)	Peak position
Scottish Albums (Official Charts)	10
UK Albums (Official Charts)	13
