= Ayoni (singer) =

American singer-songwriter (born 1999)

- Born: Ayoni Thompson; 1998 or 1999 (age 26–27); Barbados
- Origin: Indonesia; Singapore; United States
- Genres: Pop
- Occupation: Singer-songwriter
- Years active: 2017–present
- Label: Def Jam

Ayoni Thompson (born 1999), known mononymously as Ayoni, is a Bajan singer-songwriter based in Los Angeles.

== Early life ==
Ayoni was born in Barbados and moved to Miami as a young child. Throughout her childhood, Ayoni spent time living in Singapore, Jakarta and California. She began singing through her church choir, and also enjoyed creative writing, piano and guitar growing up.

Ayoni said she grew up listening to artists including Adele, Aretha Franklin, Bon Iver, Frank Ocean and Stevie Wonder.

== Career ==
Ayoni attended the Thornton School of Music at the University of Southern California, studying popular music performance beginning in 2017. She has cited Dijon, Lianne La Havas and Moses Sumney as musical influences.

== Discography ==
Ayoni has independently released three projects, as well as several singles.

=== Studio albums ===
Title	Details
Isola	Released: September 10, 2025; Label: Def Jam

=== Extended plays ===
Title	Details
Iridescent	Released: October 18, 2019; Label: Independent
The Vision	Released: September 14, 2022; Label: Good Partners

=== Singles ===
Title	Year	Album
"Divine"	2019	Iridescent
"Malibu"	2019	Iridescent
"Unmoved (A Black Woman Truth)"	2020	Non-album singles
"Disco Dancing" (with Namy)	2020	Non-album singles
"The Patriots"	2021	Non-album singles
"If You Leave"	2021	The Vision
"You Said I Love You Too Soon"	2022	The Vision
"Before I Prosper"	2022	The Vision
"Purpose"	2023	Non-album single
"Bitter in Love"	2024	Isola
"San Francisco"	2024	Isola
"2"	2025	Isola
