= Can't Lose My (Soul) =

Studio album by Annie and the Caldwells
- Released: March 21, 2025
- Recorded: October 2023
- Venue: The Message Center, West Point, Mississippi
- Genre: Gospel; soul
- Length: 35:43
- Label: Luaka Bop
- Producer: Sinkane

Annie and the Caldwells chronology
We Made It (2018)	Can't Lose My (Soul) (2025)

Can't Lose My (Soul) is the debut studio album by American gospel soul group Annie and the Caldwells. It was released on March 21, 2025, by Luaka Bop on LP and CD.

== Background ==
Can't Lose My (Soul) was recorded at the Message Center in West Point, Mississippi, by Sinkane. Consisting of six songs, it centers on the themes of spiritual struggle, redemption and grace. The tracks, "I Made It" and "Wrong", include the contributions of lead vocalist Annie Caldwell's siblings, Willie Jr and Abel Acquirius while her daughters Anjessica and Deborah added to the backing vocals of "Can't Lose My Soul". Stylistically, the album was described by several publications as uplifting, gospel, soul, disco, and R&B.

== Reception ==
Professional ratings
Review scores
Source	Rating
AllMusic	4.5/5 stars
The Guardian	5/5 stars
The Observer	4/5 stars
PopMatters	8/10 stars
La Vanguardia	4/5 stars
Mojo	4/5 stars

AllMusic described Can't Lose My (Soul) as a "shining addition to the Caldwells' legacy, and welcoming and immediate enough to make a listener feel like a congregant." The Guardian commented about the album's production, stating "it makes Can't Lose My (Soul) feel as if it's happening before your eyes, adding a vividness and urgency, particularly in extempore moments," while its sister newspaper The Observer stated "Matriarch Annie Caldwells's soaring voice steals the show in this Mississippi band's spiritual, soulful debut." Online magazine PopMatters rated the album eight out of ten and remarked "it blends gospel fervor with deep grooves and showcases it with only the lightest touch of production, allowing their sound’s big, righteous beast to take center stage."

The Times called it an uplifting album and described it as "joyful gospel disco". Catalan newspaper La Vanguardia assigned the album a rating of four out of five, and commented about the coordination of the vocals with the "instrumental fluidity", calling it spontaneous. In its review of the album, Mojo Magazine stated "the goal was to take the gospel songs and give them an aspirational smoothness and an appeal beyond their obvious audience. Here, they are stripped back, letting the raw essence rise to the surface and evoking the strength of feeling that comes through their live performances." The Economist included Can’t Lose My (Soul) in their list of the 10 best albums of 2025, noting: "The Lord’s message is carried on sinuous blues and hard funk, as well as in the sublime voices of Ms. Caldwell and her daughters."

== Track listing ==
No.	Title	Length
1.	"Wrong"	2:23
2.	"Can't Lose My Soul"	10:17
3.	"I Made It"	4:21
4.	"Don't You Hear Me Calling"	7:23
5.	"I'm Going To Rise"	3:35
6.	"Dear Lord"	7:41
Total length:		35:43

== Personnel ==
Credits for Can't Lose My (Soul) adapted from Bandcamp.

- Annie Brown Caldwell – vocals
- Deborah Caldwell Moore – backing vocals
- Anjessica Caldwell – backing vocals
- Toni Rivers – backing vocals
- Hikemia Moore – backing vocals (track 1)
- Willie Caldwell Sr. – guitar
- Willie Caldwell Jr. – bass
- Abel Acquirius Caldwell – drums
- Parker James – congas
- Ahmed Abdullahi Gallab – producer
- Albert Di Fiore – engineer
- Chris Bellman – mastering and lacquer cutting
- Yale Evelev – executive producer
- Eric Welles-Nyström – executive producer
- Danielle Amir Jackson – liner notes
- Chris Hopkins – cover art
- Jomo Fray – cover art
