= Woman of Faces =

Studio album by Celeste
- Released: 14 November 2025
- Genres: Jazz; soul; pop
- Length: 33:54
- Label: Polydor
- Producers: Jeff Bhasker; Beach Noise

Celeste chronology
Not Your Muse (2021)	Woman of Faces (2025)

Alternative cover

Singles from Woman of Faces
- 1. "This Is Who I Am" Released: 7 November 2024; 2. "On With The Show" Released: 20 June 2025; 3. "Woman of Faces" Released: 6 September 2025; 4. "Time Will Tell" Released: 11 October 2025

Woman of Faces is the second studio album of British singer-songwriter Celeste, released on 14 November 2025 through Polydor Records. The album was preceded by the singles "On With The Show", "This Is Who I Am", "Woman of Faces" and "Time Will Tell". "This Is Who I Am" was used as the theme for The Day of the Jackal.

== Background and release ==
Celeste's second album was initially meant to be finished by the end of 2022 and released in 2023. The first single from the album was "This Is Who I Am" which was released on 7 November 2024 to co-incide with the release of The Day of the Jackal, for which it was the theme. "On With The Show" was released on 20 June 2025 and Celeste announced that her second album Woman of Faces would be released in October 2025. In her Pyramid Stage set at the Glastonbury Festival 2025, Celeste performed both the released singles as well as "Time Will Tell" and "Could Be Machine". "Woman of Faces" was released on 6 September and "Time Will Tell" was released on 11 October.

Celeste was critical of her record label's behaviour around Woman of Faces. On her Instagram story in October 2025, she wrote that Polydor "[had] shown very little support towards the album", had pressured her to create more content and had threatened to drop her if she did not include certain tracks on the album. In an interview with The i Paper in November 2025, Celeste said that she had originally wanted "to make this edgy, alternative, orchestral album" and work with Robert Ames on string arrangements but had been told by her label that "no-one's gonna listen to that". The arrangements commissioned from Ames went unused. She said Woman of Faces "sounds to be a teeny bit more traditional than I would have wanted".

== Critical reception ==
Professional ratings
Aggregate scores
Source	Rating
Album of the Year	79/100
Any Decent Music?	7.8/10
Metacritic	78/100
Review scores
Source	Rating
DIY	4.5/5 stars
Clash	8/10
The Guardian	4/5 stars
The Independent	4/5 stars
The Skinny	4/5 stars
The Arts Desk	3/5 stars

Woman of Faces received generally positive reviews from critics. Sarah Jamieson, writing in DIY, said that the album "holds little back, both lyrically and musically". Alexis Petridis, writing in The Guardian, said the album was "potent and beautiful" without "sound[ing] like genre pastiche" and praised Celeste's voice. He also commented on the album's modern classical influences, noting the resemblance of the piano introduction of "People Always Change" to "Opening" from Philip Glass' Glassworks. Amelia Thompson, writing for Clash, commented that the album was "a full arc from despair to declaration" and described "Woman of Faces" as "the album's beating heart."

Several critics noted the uniformity of some of the album's tracks. Petridis writes that the album's "near-uniform pacing and tracks make it a challenge to consume in one sitting" and that it "could have benefited from more disruptive tracks along the lines of Could Be Machine". Joe Muggs, writing for The Arts Desk, said that while "[a]ny given song is great" the album left him "wondering if there couldn't have been room for just a little bit more variation here." Sophia Goddard, writing for The Skinny, commented that "while a few of the songs feel somewhat repetitive, they are more than compensated for" by experimentation on other tracks.

== Track listing ==
Woman of Faces track listing
No.	Title	Length
1.	"On With The Show"	2:28
2.	"Keep Smiling"	3:17
3.	"Woman of Faces"	4:51
4.	"Happening Again"	4:04
5.	"Time Will Tell"	3:44
6.	"People Always Change"	4:50
7.	"Sometimes"	3:03
8.	"Could Be Machine"	3:49
9.	"This Is Who I Am"	3:48
Total length:		33:54

Deluxe edition
No.	Title	Length
10.	"Angel Like You"	3:19
11.	"Carmen's Song"	3:03
Total length:		40:16

== Charts ==
Chart performance for Woman of Faces
Chart (2025)	Peak position
German Albums (Offizielle Top 100)	47
Scottish Albums (Official Charts)	3
UK Albums (Official Charts)	12
UK Album Downloads (Official Charts)	11
