= All I Can Take =

Song by Justin Bieber

from the album Swag
- Released: July 11, 2025
- Genre: R&B
- Length: 4:08
- Label: Def Jam; ILH
- Songwriters: Justin Bieber; Eddie Benjamin; Carter Lang; Dylan Wiggins; Daniel Chetrit; Tobias Jesso Jr.; Jackson Morgan
- Producers: Bieber; Benjamin; Lang; Wiggins; Chetrit

"All I Can Take" is a song by Canadian singer Justin Bieber. It was released through Def Jam Recordings and ILH Productions as the opening track from his seventh studio album, Swag, on July 11, 2025. The song was produced by Bieber himself, Eddie Benjamin, Carter Lang, Dylan Wiggins, and Daniel Chetrit, with the five of them writing it alongside Tobias Jesso Jr. and Jackson Morgan. Critics compared the song to Michael Jackson and praised its R&B production, often referring to it as the best song from Swag.

== Composition ==
"All I Can Take" is described as a "vibey, glimmering" opening track that introduces the album with a "smooth and groovy" sound. Bieber's vocals, compared by some critics to those of Michael Jackson, are layered over "synth-y keyboard riff channels". Lyrically, the song explores "symptoms of his sensitivity", with Bieber expressing feelings of being "misunderstood" and turning to his relationship with his wife, Hailey Bieber, and sex as a means of escape.

== Critical reception ==
Rachel Aroesti of The Guardian praised the song as "a hauntological twist on spotless, energetic 1980s R&B", highlighting its dream-like "echoey vocals, fast, faded beats" and "maudlin synths." Yannik Gölz of Laut.de called it an "unexpected reference" to Michael Jackson, opening the album with "weightless synthesizers". Editors of Diario de Yucatán praised Bieber's vocals as "as sweet as ever", especially in the pre-chorus. Adam White of The Independent considered it the album's best track.

With its "vintage groove", the song has drawn comparisons to Bieber's earlier material, featuring lyrics that reflect his current reality. Lyndsey Havens of Billboard ranked it fourth among the album's tracks, describing it as "an experimental, alternative take on the R&B of Bieber's prime" that "sets the stage" for the project. She noted that Bieber's voice "shines through" the confident production, evoking a "sense of freedom".

== Charts ==
=== Weekly charts ===
Weekly chart performance for "All I Can Take"
Chart (2025)	Peak position
Australia (ARIA)	22
Bolivia Anglo Airplay (Monitor Latino)	4
Brazil Hot 100 (Billboard)	77
Canada Hot 100 (Billboard)	12
Denmark (Tracklisten)	13
Global 200 (Billboard)	16
Ireland (IRMA)	30
Japan Hot Overseas (Billboard Japan)	7
Lithuania Airplay (TopHit)	43
Netherlands (Single Top 100)	51
New Zealand (Recorded Music NZ)	19
Norway (IFPI Norge)	41
South Korea BGM (Circle)	141
Sweden (Sverigetopplistan)	61
Switzerland (Schweizer Hitparade)	36
UK Singles (Official Charts)	33
UK Hip Hop/R&B (Official Charts)	6
US Billboard Hot 100	21

=== Monthly charts ===
Monthly chart performance for "All I Can Take"
Chart (2025)	Peak position
Lithuania Airplay (TopHit)	82

== Certifications ==
Certifications for "All I Can Take"
Region	Certification	Certified units/sales
Brazil (Pro-Música Brasil)	Gold	20,000^{‡}
Canada (Music Canada)	Gold	40,000^{‡}
^{‡} Sales+streaming figures based on certification alone.
