= Flowers (Durand Jones & The Indications album) =

Studio album by Durand Jones & The Indications
- Released: June 27, 2025
- Length: 40:25
- Label: Dead Oceans
- Producer: Aaron Frazer; Durand Jones; Steve Okonski; Blake Rhein

Durand Jones & The Indications chronology
Private Space (2021)	Flowers (2025)

Singles from Flowers
- 1. "Been So Long" Released: March 18, 2025

Flowers is the fourth studio album by American soul group Durand Jones & The Indications. It was released on June 27, 2025, via Dead Oceans in LP, CD and digital formats. Flowers, preceded by the band's 2021 project, Private Space, was self-produced and written by the band at the home of guitarist Blake Rhein in Chicago. The lead single, "Been So Long", was released on March 18, 2025.

== Reception ==
Professional ratings
Review scores
Source	Rating
AllMusic	4/5 stars
Mojo	4/5 stars
Spill	3.5/5 stars
The Skinny	4/5 stars
Uncut	8/10 stars

The album received a four-star rating from AllMusic, whose reviewer Andy Kellman noted, "Nothing is overly ornate. For the most part, it's a lowrider delight. There's no uptempo disco-funk. Plush, delightfully lazing ballads are the main mode." The Skinny described it as "another lunch-line scoop of hearty 70s soul revivalism from music's most dependable dispensary. It's just on the underside of too pretty for its own good," and assigned it a rating of four stars.

Uncut's Johnny Sharp remarked about the album, "here they have shuffled back a few years from the disco and jazz-funk infusions of 2021's Private Space to a more sun-dappled classic soul sound," giving it a score of eight.

Stevie Chick of Mojo rated Flowers four stars, noted about songs from the album, "Elsewhere, The Indications offer pure escapism on 'Lovers' Holiday' with the expertise that's made them their generation's finest retronauts. The Stylistics would've killed for a song like 'Paradise', and I'm not sure they'd have performed it better." Spill gave it a score of 3.5 out of five, calling it "a solid album, even if it might not quite reach the same level as their previous record, Private Space."

== Track listing ==
All tracks are written by Aaron Frazer, Durand Jones, Stephen Okonski, and Blake Rhein; "Everything" written with Michael Montgomery, Ginger Dolden, and Pete Lanctot; "Rust and Steel", "If Not for Love", and "Without You" written with Dolden and Lanctot.

Flowers track listing
No.	Title	Length
1.	"Flowers"	0:24
2.	"Paradise"	5:01
3.	"Lovers' Holiday"	3:25
4.	"I Need the Answer"	4:04
5.	"Flower Moon"	4:56
6.	"Really Wanna Be with You"	4:31
7.	"Been So Long"	3:16
8.	"Everything"	2:52
9.	"Rust and Steel"	4:56
10.	"If Not for Love"	3:23
11.	"Without You"	3:37
Total length:		40:25

== Personnel ==
Credits adapted from Tidal.

=== Durand Jones & The Indications ===
- Aaron Frazer – drums, production (all tracks); vocals (tracks 1, 2, 4, 5, 7, 8, 10, 11), synthesizer (4, 5, 7)
- Durand Jones – production (all tracks), vocals (3–7, 9–11)
- Michael Montgomery – bass (1–5, 7, 8, 10)
- Steve Okonski – production (all tracks); keyboards (1–6, 8–11)
- Blake Rhein – guitar, production (all tracks), engineering (1, 2, 5, 10), bass (3, 5, 6, 10), synthesizer (4, 5); drums, background vocals (5)

=== Additional contributors ===
- Jonathan Castelli – mixing
- Dale Becker – mastering
- Julian Dreyer – engineering
- Travis Pavur – engineering
- Anthony Masino – engineering (7, 10)
- Mae.Sun – flute (1–5); clarinet, saxophone (10)
- Brian Gazo – percussion (3–6, 10), background vocals (6)
- Michael "MKY" Jimenez – background vocals (3, 5–8, 10)
- Michael Damani – background vocals (3, 5, 7)
- Wyatt Waddell – background vocals (3, 5, 7)
- Tiffany Johns – flugelhorn (4), trombone (5, 6); arrangement, French horn (6)
- Cade Gotthardt – flugelhorn (4), trumpet (5, 6)
- Alex Young – saxophone (5, 6)
- Adryon de León – background vocals (5, 9)
- Kim Dawson – background vocals (5, 9)
- Emily Elkin – cello (6)
- Marta Sofia Honer – viola (6)
- Kate Outterbridge – violin (6)
- Oliver Hill – violin (6)
- Ginger Dolden – arrangement, violin (8–11)
- Pete Lanctot – arrangement, viola (8–11)
- Tiger Darrow – cello (8–11)
- Anna Brathwaite-McGregor – violin (8–11)
- Domenic Salerni – violin (8–11)
- Alysha Monique – background vocals (8, 9)
- Ashley Otis – background vocals (8, 9)
- Crofton Coleman – background vocals (8, 9)
- Miles Johnson – art direction
- Andrea Peterson – artwork, cover painting
- Elan Watson – photography
- Kalie Johnston – photography
