= Cktrl =

British musician

Bradley Miller, known artistically as cktrl (/kənˈtrəʊl/), is a British multi-instrumentalist and producer.

== Biography ==
Miller was born to Montserratian parents and was brought up in Lewisham. As a child, he learned the clarinet and saxophone through a free music service funded by the local council. Miller taught himself production and worked at a record store and as a DJ.

cktrl stands for "Can’t Keep to Reality".

== Discography ==
=== Singles and EPs ===
- Forest (EP, 2015)
- Colour (2019)
- Robyn (EP, 2020)
- "mazes" (2021)
- Zero (EP, 2021)
- Yield (EP, 2022)

=== Full-length albums ===
- spirit (2025)
