= Hillaryville, Louisiana =

- Unincorporated community
- Location within Louisiana Location within the United States
- Coordinates: 30°08′09″N 90°57′08″W
- Country: United States
- State: Louisiana
- Parish: Ascension
- Elevation: 16 ft (4.9 m)
- Time zone: UTC-6 (Central (CST))
  - Summer (DST): UTC-5 (CDT)
- Area code: 225
- GNIS feature ID: 543444

Hillaryville is an unincorporated community in Ascension Parish, Louisiana, United States. Hillaryville is located along the Mississippi River and Louisiana Highway 22, 7.4 miles (11.9 km) south-southwest of Gonzales, west of Burnside, and is a part of the town of Darrow, LA.

The small community is traced back to the late 1800s. It is home to Word of Life Christian Center.

Hometown of Durand Jones of Durand Jones & the Indications, who made it the subject of his first solo studio album, Wait Til I Get Over.
