= Durand Jones & The Indications =

American soul group

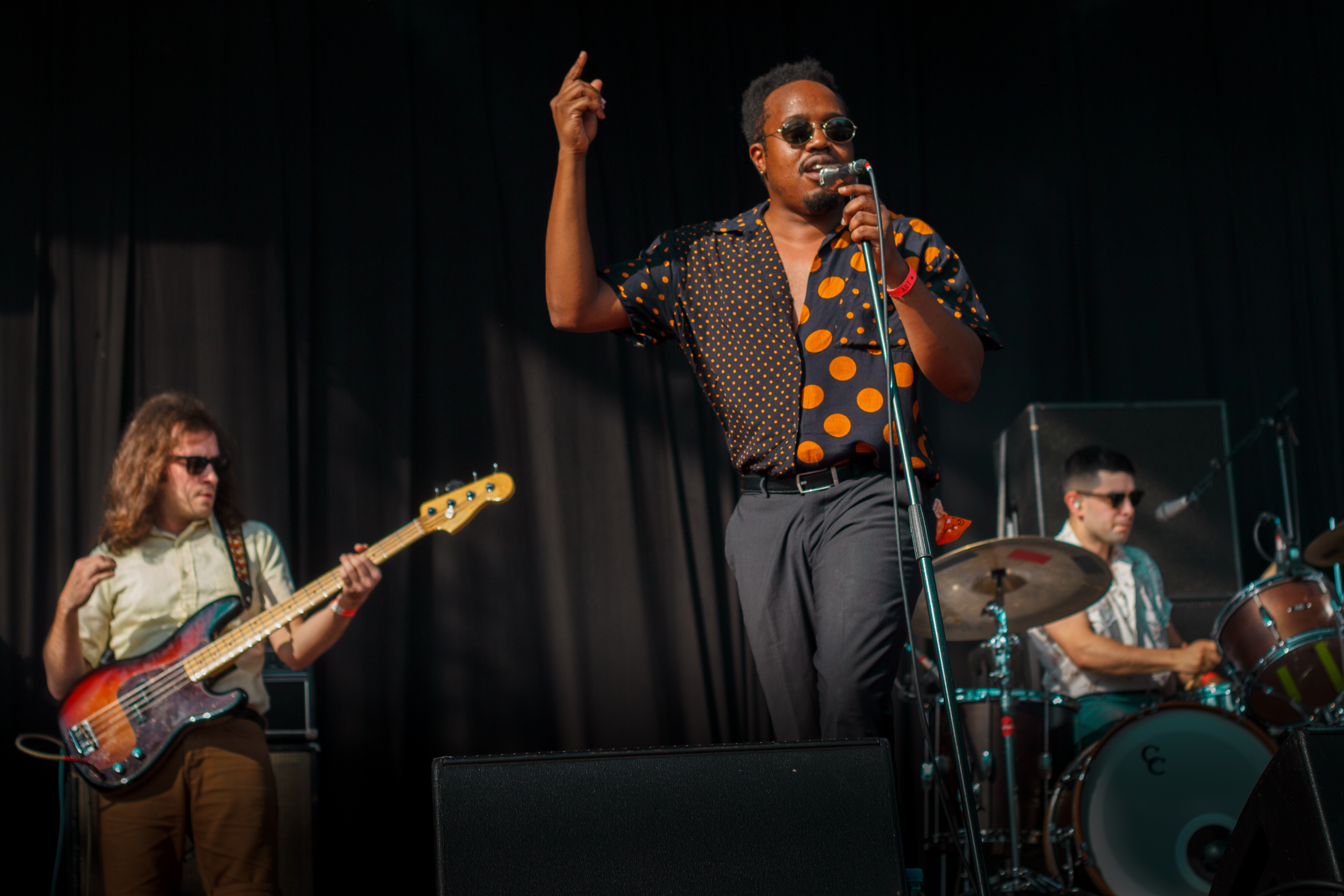
- Durand Jones & The Indications at Haldern Pop Festival 2019

Background information
- Origin: Bloomington, Indiana
- Genres: Retro-soul; contemporary R&B
- Years active: 2012–present
- Labels: Colemine, Dead Oceans
- Members: Durand Jones; Aaron Frazer; Blake Rhein; Steve Okonski; Michael Montgomery
- Past members: Kyle Houpt; Justin Hubler
- Website: durandjonesandtheindications.com

Durand Jones & The Indications is an American contemporary R&B and soul group founded by the core songwriting trio of singer Durand Jones, singer/drummer Aaron Frazer, and guitarist Blake Rhein. Formed in 2012, the band came to prominence as part of the soul revivalist movement around the time of the reissue of their debut album in 2018. Their second album American Love Call was released in March 2019, followed by Private Space in July 2021. Their fourth studio album, Flowers, was released in 2025.

== History ==
Blake Rhein and Aaron Frazer, two students at Indiana University's Jacobs School of Music, developed a musical relationship with Durand Jones in the early 2010s based on their shared interests in songwriting and old soul 45s. Rhein had met Jones, a Louisiana native doing postgraduate studies for classical saxophone, while both were working with Indiana University's Soul Revue. Rhein and Frazer would later bring in the two other members of their blues rock band Charlie Patton's War, bassist Kyle Houpt and organist Justin Hubler, to form The Indications. They wrote what would be their debut album between Fall 2012 and 2014, recording on a Tascam four-track recorder. Concurrently, Charlie Patton's War toured regionally and nationally; between tours, Durand Jones & The Indications played their "one and only show" in May 2014.

In 2015, the band was approached by Ohio soul label Colemine Records about releasing an album of music from their earlier sessions. They released their first 45 in 2015 and followed with their debut album Durand Jones & The Indications the following year. They played a single show in Bloomington in April 2016 before going off to separate careers. Following support from critics and independent record stores, the band would reunite and toured throughout 2017, primarily in the Midwest and the South. In 2017, Steve Okonski replaced Justin Hubler as organist. Their album was reissued by Bloomington label Dead Oceans in 2018 with new live material.

The Chicano lowrider community, noted for their love of oldies, were early champions of The Indications and began circulating their music as early as 2016. In tribute, the band released the b-side "Cruisin' to the Park" in 2019. The track was later released as a single with an accompanying music video featuring California lowriders. In 2021, they released a Spanish language version, "Cruisin' to the Parque," with former tourmate Y La Bamba.

During July and August 2018, the band recorded their second album in Brooklyn, New York and focused on developing a "vocal group sound." Their record, American Love Call, was released in March 2018. The band toured continuously through 2020, with Mike Montgomery joining as bassist at the end of 2019. Among other singles released in 2020, the band put out a studio version of their song "Power to the People" two weeks ahead of the 2020 presidential election; the demo version was originally released as part of the 2017 compilation Our First 100 Days.

Recorded in January 2020, Frazer released a Dan Auerbach-produced solo album in January 2021, at which time he noted that a new Durand Jones & The Indications album was in the works. He previously released music under the alias The Flying Stars of Brooklyn NY. Jones appeared as a guest vocalist on a number of tracks beginning in 2020, including on The Bamboos 2021 album. Of note, Rhein has worked as a researcher for The Numero Group and produced a number of reissue compilations for the label.

In May 2021, the band announced that their third record, Private Space, would be released July 30, 2021 and released the lead single "Witchoo". The ten track album was recorded in New York City at Diamond Mine and features a more disco and modern soul-inspired sound. The album was written and produced by Jones, Frazer, Rhein, and Okonski with contributions from bassist Michael Montgomery as well as arrangers Ginger Dolden and Peter Lanctot, harpist Brandee Younger, and Eli "Paperboy" Reed, among others.

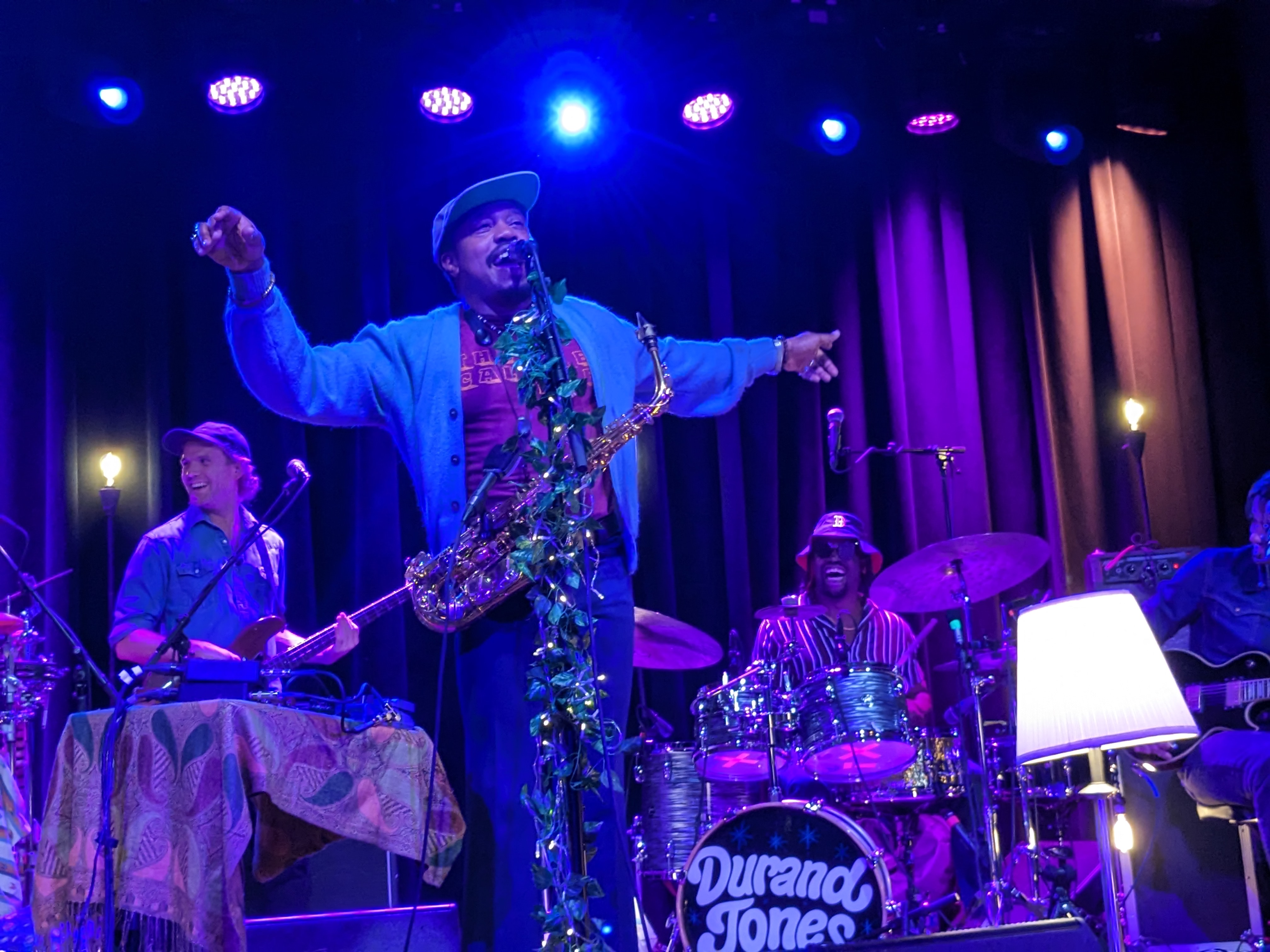
Durand Jones performing in Somerville, MA, on the Wait Til I Get Over tour, October 2023

On May 5, 2023, Jones released a solo record under his own name, Wait Til I Get Over, on record label Dead Oceans. The album chronicles the history of Jones' hometown of Hillaryville, Louisiana. In 2024, Jones performed four tracks from Wait Til I Get Over with three members of The Harlem Gospel Travelers as background vocals for NPR's Tiny Desk Concerts. In 2026, Morning In America from American Love Call was featured in the soundtrack of MLB the Show 26.

== Members ==
- Durand Jones – vocals (2012–present)
- Aaron Frazer – vocals, drums, percussion, synthesizer (2012–present)
- Blake Rhein – guitar, synthesizer, percussion, vocals (2012–present)
- Steve Okonski – organ, piano, synthesizer, vocals (2017–present)
- Michael Isvara Montgomery – bass, vocals (2019–present)

Former members

- Kyle Houpt – bass (2013–2019)
- Justin Hubler – organ, piano (2013–2017)

== Discography ==
=== Studio albums ===
Title	Album details	Peak chart positions				
Title	Album details	US	US Indie	US Heat	US Taste	UK
Durand Jones & The Indications	Released: 2016; Label: Colemine Records; Format: LP, CD, digital; Reissued March 16, 2018 by Dead Oceans	—	—	—	—	—
American Love Call	Released: March 1, 2019; Label: Dead Oceans, Colemine; Format: LP, CD, digital	—	11	5	14	—
Private Space	Released: July 30, 2021; Label: Dead Oceans, Colemine; Format: LP, CD, cassette, digital	127	16	1	2	98
Flowers	Released: June 27, 2025; Label: Dead Oceans	—	—	—	—	—
"—" denotes a recording that did not chart or was not released in that territory.

=== Live albums ===
Title	Album details	Peak chart positions	
Title	Album details	US Indie	US Heat
Live Vol. 1	Released: March 16, 2018; Label: Dead Oceans, Colemine; Format: LP; Also released with deluxe edition of debut album	36	11

=== Singles ===
Title (A-side/B-side)	Year	Peak chart positions	Album	Format
Title (A-side/B-side)	Year	US AAA	Album	Format
"Smile" "Tuck 'n' Roll"	2015	—	Durand Jones & The Indications	45
"Make a Change" "Is It Any Wonder?"	2017	—	Durand Jones & The Indications	45
"You and Me" (Penny & The Quarters cover) "Put a Smile on Your Face" (E.J. & The Echoes cover)	2018	—	Durand Jones & The Indications (Deluxe Edition)	45, digital
"Don't You Know"	2018	—	American Love Call	digital
"True Love" "Don't You Know"	2019	—	American Love Call	45
"Long Way Home"	2019	—	American Love Call	digital
"Morning in America"	2019	—	American Love Call	digital
"Morning in America" "Cruisin' to the Park"	2019	—	American Love Call	45
"Cruisin' to the Park"	2019	—	Non-album singles	digital
"Young Americans (David Bowie cover)	2020	—	Non-album singles	digital
"Never Heard 'Em Say"	2020	—	Non-album singles	digital
"Power to the People"	2020	—	Non-album singles	digital
"Cruisin' to the Park" (featuring Y La Bamba)	2021	—	Non-album singles	digital
"Witchoo"	2021	22	Private Space	digital
"Witchoo" "Love Will Work It Out"	2021	—	Private Space	45
"Love Will Work It Out"	2021	—	Private Space	digital
"The Way That I Do"	2021	—	Private Space	digital
"—" denotes a recording that did not chart or was not released in that territory.

== Awards ==
Year	Awards	Category	Nominated work	Result
2019	Libera Awards	Best R&B Album	Durand Jones & The Indications	Nominated
2020	Libera Awards	Best R&B Album	American Love Call	Nominated
