= Destin Conrad =

American singer-songwriter (born 2000)

- Conrad in 2026

Background information
- Born: June 25, 2000 (age 26); Tampa, Florida, U.S.
- Origin: Tampa, Florida
- Genres: R&B, Alternative R&B
- Occupations: Singer; songwriter
- Years active: 2014–present
- Label: Independent

Destin Conrad (born June 26, 2000) is an American singer and songwriter.

== Early life ==
Destin was born in Tampa, Florida and raised by a single Jamaican-born mother. His aunt was an evangelist and she would take him to sing in church and for church events. He first gained popularity on the social network Vine, where he made his first Vine in 2014 and would later amass over 1 million followers. Vine is also where he first connected with singer Kehlani, who he considers a friend and big sister.

== Career ==
After establishing himself as a social media personality on Vine, he began to release music as singles. In 2019, he released the single "Cautious". Over the next few years, he issued more songs, including a collaboration with Ambré titled "Fraud" and trap/R&B hybrid "Closure", both songs were released in 2020. By 2021, he was able to release a collection of 9 songs for Colorway. He released Satin in 2022, Submissive in late 2023, and Submissive 2 in 2024. He has written for other artists like Kehlani and Ambré. He also collaborated with singer/songwriter Alex Isley (daughter of Ernie Isley) for the 2024 single titled "Same Mistake". They also released a music video for the single. Beginning in 2024, Destin Conrad embarked on his first headlining tour, a 36-city U.S. tour that began at Come and Take It Live in Austin, Texas on February 4, 2024, and wrapped in Los Angeles at Echoplex on Friday, April 5, 2024. Destin Conrad received his first grammy nomination for Best Progressive R&B Album with his 2025 debut album Love on Digital.

== Personal life ==
Conrad is openly gay and identifies as a queer artist.

== Discography ==
Studio albums and EPs
Year	Title	Type	Notes	Ref
2021	Colorway	EP	9 tracks	
2022	Satin	EP	9 tracks, released November 11, 2022	
2023	Submissive	EP	9 tracks	
2024	Submissive 2	EP	9 tracks, released January 19, 2024	
2025	Love on Digital	Studio album	15 tracks, released April 25, 2025	
2026	wHIMSY	Studio album	11 tracks, released April 10, 2026	
2026	Roadrunner	Studio album	13 tracks, released August 21, 2026	

== Awards and nominations ==
Association	Nominated work	Year	Category	Result	Ref.
Grammy Awards	Love on Digital	2026	Best Progressive R&B Album	Nominated	
