= Live at The Hammersmith Apollo =

Live album by The Teskey Brothers
- Released: 11 July 2025
- Venue: Hammersmith Apollo
- Length: 63:00
- Label: Mushroom Records
- Producer: The Teskey Brothers, Declan Gaffney

The Teskey Brothers chronology
The Circle Session (2024)	Live at The Hammersmith Apollo (2025)

Live at The Hammersmith Apollo is the third live album by Australian indie blues rock band The Teskey Brothers. The album was recorded during the band's three shows at London's Hammersmith Apollo in 2024. It announced in May 2025 and released on 11 July 2025.

At the 2025 ARIA Music Awards, the album won the ARIA Award for Best Blues and Roots Album.

== Critical reception ==
Hal Horowitz from Rock and Blue Muse said "It's a classy, controlled yet freewheeling event, captured to tape without overdubbing. The band is fired up, the crowd is too, the audio is clean and that's all you need for a listening experience that's as close as you can get to being there."

== Track listing ==
No.	Title	Writer(s)	Length
1.	"Man of the Universe"		4:36
2.	"Oceans of Emotions"		4:09
3.	"Take My Heart"		5:04
4.	"London Bridge"		5:31
5.	"Carry Me Home"		4:44
6.	"Paint My Heart"		12:15
7.	"What Will Be"		14:45
8.	"Try a Little Tenderness"	Jimmy Campbell, Reg Connelly and Henry Woods	3:28
9.	"Forever You and Me"		2:43
10.	"I'm Leaving"		6:37

== Charts ==
Chart performance for Live at The Hammersmith Apollo
Chart (2025)	Peak position
Australian Artist Albums (ARIA)	8
Australian Vinyl Albums (ARIA)	6
