= Joy Crookes =

British singer-songwriter (born 1998)

- Crookes in 2026

Background information
- Born: Joy Elizabeth Akther Crookes; 9 October 1998 (age 28); Lambeth, London, England
- Origin: South London, England
- Genres: Neo soul; alternative R&B
- Occupation: Singer-songwriter
- Instruments: Voice; guitar; piano
- Years active: 2015–present
- Labels: Speakerbox; Insanity
- Website: joycrookes.com

Joy Elizabeth Akther Crookes (born 9 October 1998) is a British singer-songwriter. She incorporates details about relationships, self-reliance, her culture, her South London roots, and her identity in her music. Crookes has released three extended plays since 2017 and was nominated for the Rising Star Award at the 2020 Brit Awards.

Her debut studio album, Skin, was released in October 2021 to wide critical acclaim and reached the top five in the UK. The album was nominated for the Mercury Prize, and Crookes received nominations for Best New Artist and Best Pop/R&B Act at the 2022 Brit Awards.

She was voted fourth place on Sound of 2020 by the BBC. She released her second album, Juniper, in September 2025 to critical acclaim. She made her acting debut in Ish, which premiered in August 2025.

== Early life ==
Joy Elizabeth Akther Crookes was born in the Lambeth district of South London on 9 October 1998 to a Bangladeshi mother from Comilla and an Irish father from Dublin. She grew up in Elephant and Castle where she spent eight years at a Catholic state primary school. Crookes attended the fee-paying Portland Place School in central London for secondary education. Crookes gained interest in singing after attending a jazz and blues workshop and, by the age of 13, had started publishing covers of Laura Marling and reggae to YouTube. Whilst a teenager Crookes taught herself how to play guitar, piano and bass, before writing her own music. When she was 14, she moved with her mother to Ladbroke Grove. In April 2013, Crookes uploaded a cover of "Hit the Road Jack" by Ray Charles to YouTube at the age of 15. The video gained the attention of over 600,000 viewers, notably including her current manager a few months later.

== Career ==
=== 2016–2017: Influence ===
At the age of 17, Crookes released her debut single "New Manhattan" in February 2016, as well as "Sinatra" in August 2016, and "Bad Feeling" in June 2017. "New Manhattan" is a love song that was named after the area in Brussels. M Magazine wrote about Crookes at the start of her career, stating, "[She] may not be out of school yet, but what she lacks in experience she certainly makes up for in sonic dexterity." When describing the aesthetic in Crookes' debut music video for "Sinatra", Pip Williams from Line of Best Fit wrote, "much like [her] sound, [the video] blurs the classic with the contemporary, blanketing the listener in nostalgia whilst teasing them with hints of something brand new."

Crookes released her debut EP, Influence, with Speakerbox and Insanity Records in July 2017. The five-track EP lasts less than 20 minutes and features "Sinatra", "Bad Feeling", "New Manhattan", "Mother May I Sleep With Danger?" and "Power". Crookes performed "Mother May I Sleep With Danger?" along with her guitar player Charles J Monneraud on the global music platform, COLORS, in December 2017. As of November 2019, the video gained over eight million views on YouTube. She told BBC that she wrote the song by herself on New Year's Day of 2017 and began playing the song on tour, stating "When you tour a song you get to know it – you stay over at its house, you meet its mum, you get to know the sibling it doesn't like. So by the time we did Colors, it was a walk in the park. The video really changed everything. For about six months after that, everywhere I went people would say, 'Are you Joy from Colors?'"

=== 2018–2019: Reminiscence and Perception ===
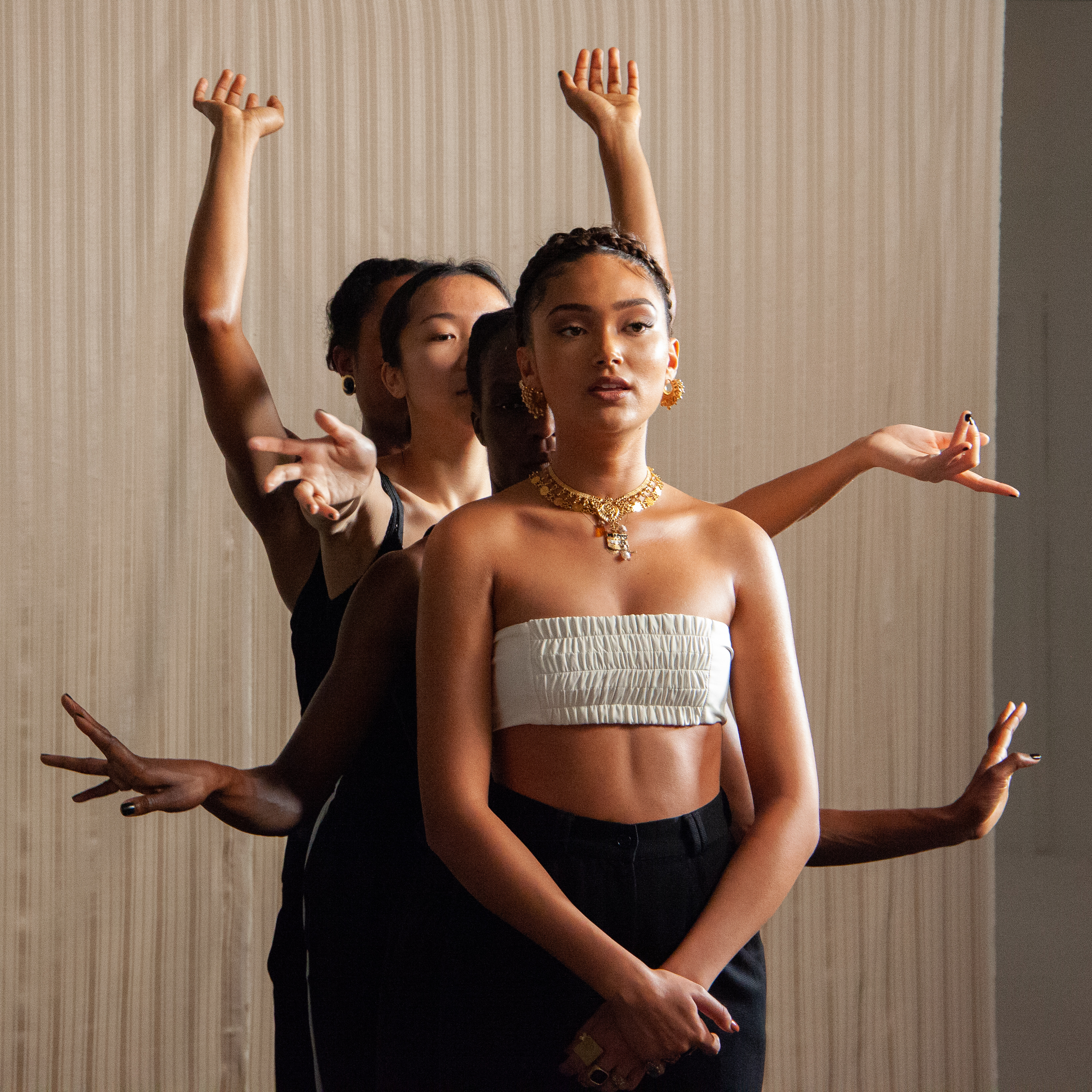
Crookes shooting the music video for "Don't Let Me Down" in 2018.

Crookes released the single "Don't Let Me Down" with an accompanying music video in November 2018, before releasing her second EP, Reminiscence, in January 2019. Clare O'Shea from The Line of Best Fit described the EP as "a collection of five distinct tracks melding pop, R&B and soul." The EP features "Man's World", "Lover Don't", "Don't Let Me Down", "For a Minute" as well as the song "Two Nights". Crookes made her first appearance in Vogue in March 2019, before releasing the singles "Since I Left You": "a hauntingly stripped back break-up song," as well as "London Mine" in April 2019. "The song celebrates the invisible people and how London belongs to no one but everyone," Crookes told The Line of Best Fit about "London Mine". "It's a celebration of immigrants who make up this country."

Crookes performed on the Introducing Stage at BBC Radio 1's Big Weekend in May 2019, before releasing her third EP, Perception in June 2019. The five-track EP features "Hurts", "No Hands", "London Mine", "Since I Left You", and "Darkest Hour". Crookes made her first Glastonbury Festival appearance in June 2019. In September 2019, Crookes released the self-produced track "Yah / Element", a medley of "Yah" and "Element" by Kendrick Lamar, before announcing her headlining tour of Europe for October 2019. She released the single "Early" with Irish hip-hop artist Jafaris in early October, which later went on to reach No. 1 on the UK Asian chart. Crookes made her debut television appearance when she performed "Early" with Jafaris on Later... with Jools Holland in November 2019. Crookes made an appearance on the Irish music TV series Other Voices in November 2019. Crookes was shortlisted for the Rising Star Award at the 2020 Brit Awards. She was placed fourth in Sound of 2020, an annual BBC poll of 170 music critics who predict breakthrough acts for the coming year. Crookes was praised her for her "South London stories filled with wit and romance".

=== 2020–2025: Skin ===
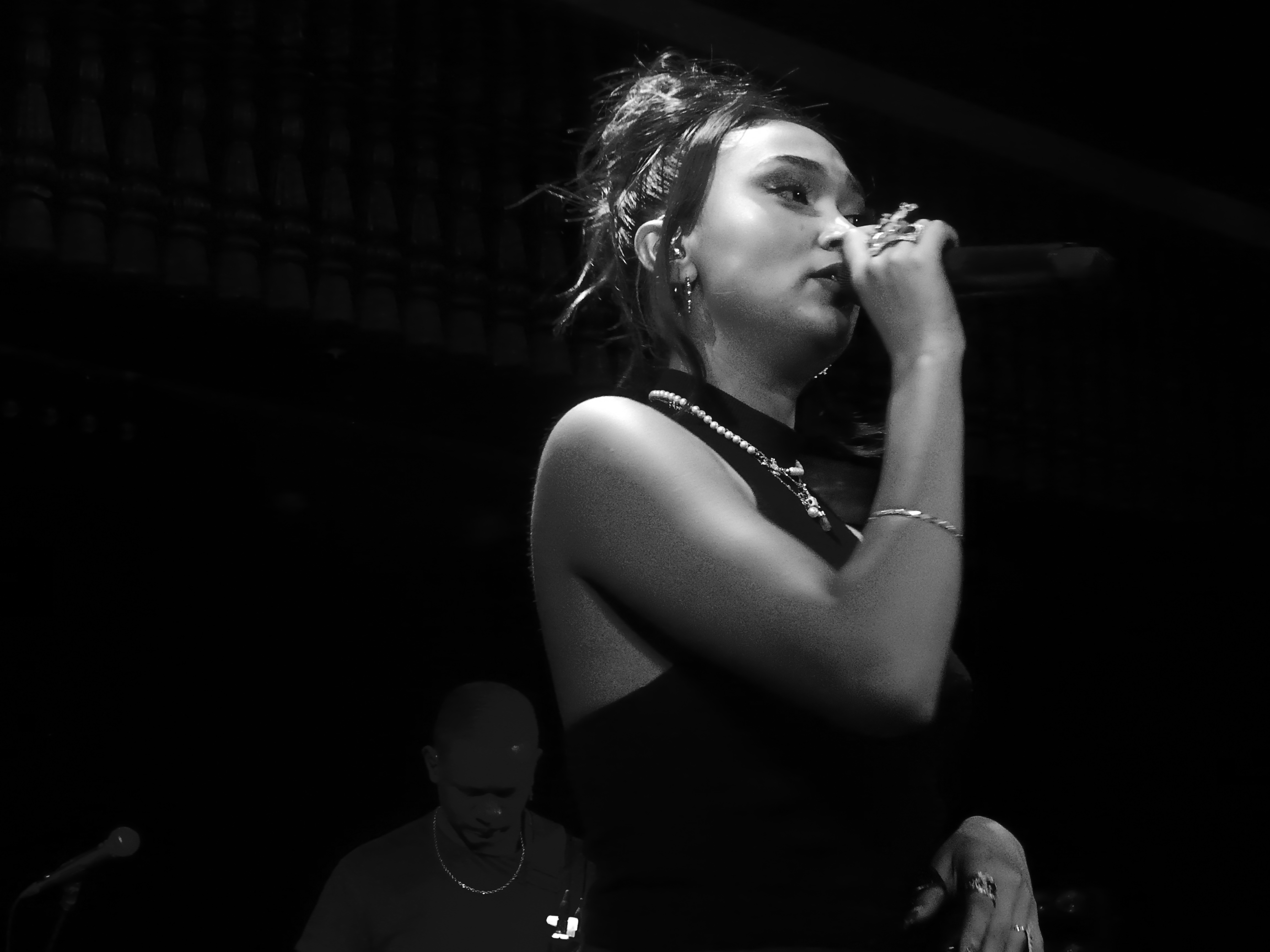
Crookes performing in 2021

In April 2020, Crookes released her first single of 2020, "Anyone But Me", which debuted atop the UK Asian Top 40. The song is about her battles with mental health and how she feels that "there's another person living in [her] head." In September 2020, Crookes released a cover version of The Wannadies' 1994 single "You & Me Song", which was featured in an O2 TV advertisement, consequently entering both the UK Singles Downloads and the UK Singles Sales charts. Crookes released the single "Feet Don't Fail Me Now" in June 2021, which became her third single to top the UK Asian Top 40 and is featured on the EA Sports video game FIFA 22 It served as the lead single from her debut album, Skin, which she revealed alongside the release of its title track in August 2021. Its third single, "When You Were Mine", was released later that month and became her fourth single to top the UK Asian Top 40. "Trouble" was released as the fourth single a few days before the release of Skin on 15 October 2021.

On the album, Crookes incorporates samples on songs like "19th Floor" and "Kingdom". In an interview with Sound of Boston, Crookes explains the origins of both samples, and why she chose to include them: "The opening of 19th Floor is my grandma saying goodbye to me as she usually does when I leave her flat on the 19th floor of her block in south London. The voice call in Kingdom is my dad talking about the importance of punk music. I included these to contextualize my life at the time and where those songs were born from. I am a super family-orientated person and it felt like an important part of my narrative to include them on the album."

On 18 October 2024, Crookes was featured on the song "Strength (R U Ready)" from The Blessed Madonna's album, Godspeed.

=== 2025–present: Juniper ===
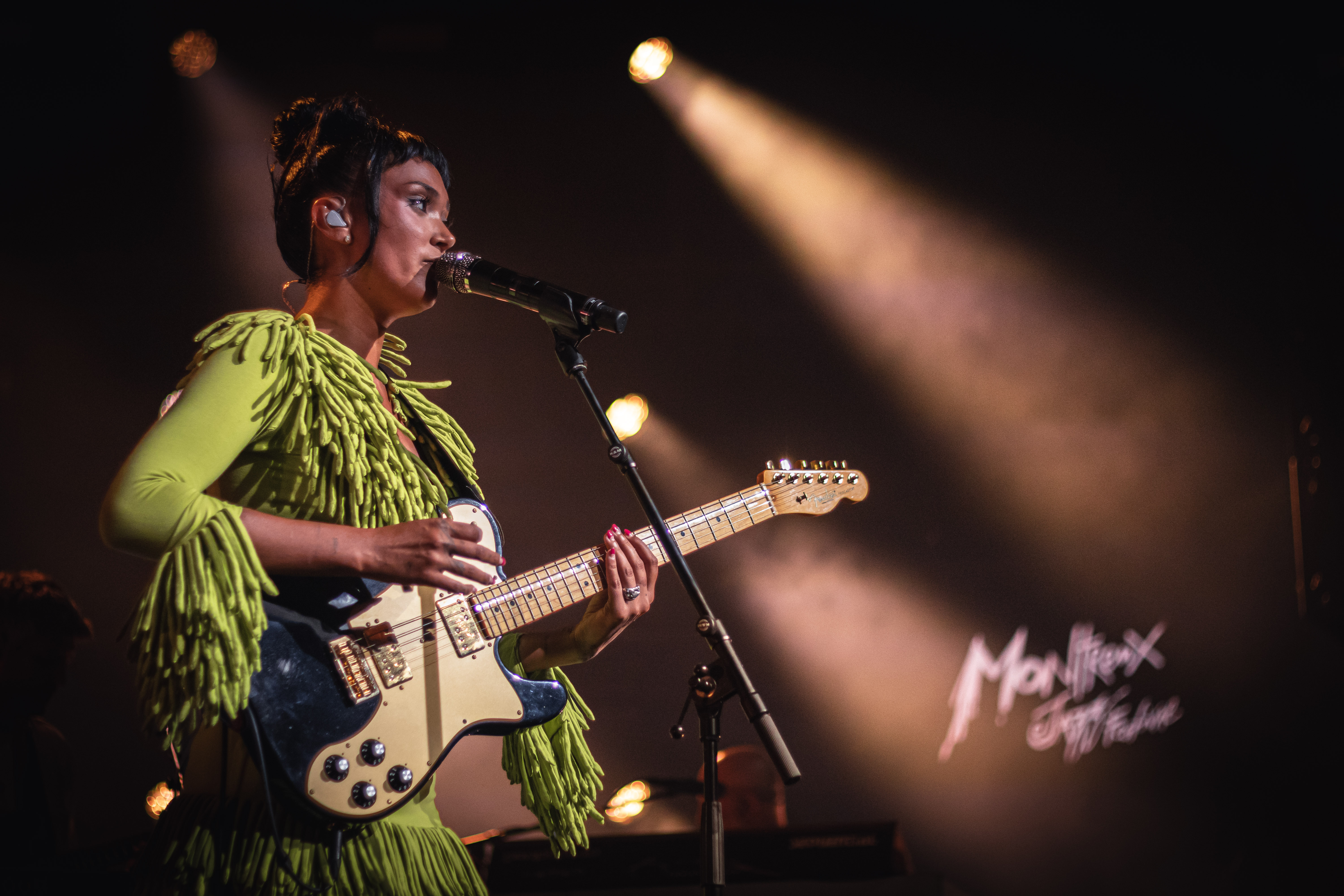
Crookes performing at the 2026 Montreux Jazz Festival

On 10 January 2025, Crookes premiered a new single titled "Pass The Salt", featuring Vince Staples. A second single, "Mathematics", featuring Kano was released on 5 February, the song became her first number one on the British Asian Music Chart. Her second album, Juniper, was released on 26 September 2025. The album received mostly positive reviews from critics. In a four-star review for The Guardian, Alexis Petridis opined that the album "asserts Crookes’s talent as a vocalist and songwriter". In an 8/10 review for The Line of Best Fit, critic Lana Williams stated that the album was a "triumphant foray that establishes her as a truly unparalleled artist." In an interview with the BBC, Crookes stated that the album had been inspired by her struggles with anxiety, as well as an abusive relationship which culminated in a "hedonistic period of her life". A deluxe version of the album featuring the bonus track "Fade Your Heart", from the soundtrack to EA Sports FC 26, was released on 31 October.

In promotion of the album, she performed at the Tate Modern on 26 September, as well as at the Glastonbury Festival 2025. She then embarked on a tour containing dates in Europe, Britain and America, whilst also serving as an opener for Lewis Capaldi's 2026 North American tour. She made her acting debut as Samira in Ish, which premiered at the 2025 Venice International Film Festival.

On 15 September 2026, Crookes released a new single "Painkiller" featuring Denzel Curry. The song peaked at number 2 on the British Asian Music Chart.

== Personal life and artistry ==
Crookes is an Arsenal supporter. Crookes had the name of her Irish grandfather, Frankie Crookes, tattooed on her arm before he died in 2018.

Crookes has cited Black Uhuru, Marvin Gaye, The Pogues, Sinéad O'Connor, Kendrick Lamar, Gregory Isaacs, and Kate Nash as some of the names incorporated with her first experiences with music. She told the BBC about the music she was exposed to whilst driving with her father to her Irish dancing lessons, "My dad wanted to give me a real education. From Nick Cave to King Tubby to all this Pakistani music. He'd say, 'This is from your ends of the world, you should hear this.'" She named Madvillain and Young Marble Giants as inspiration for her second album.

In 2025, she stated she had previously been in a relationship with a woman, an experience which inspired the closing track of her album Juniper, titled "Paris".

== Discography ==
=== Studio albums ===
Title	Details	Peak chart positions						
Title	Details	UK	BEL (WA)	FRA	GER	IRE	SCO	SWI
Skin	Released: 15 October 2021; Format: Cassette, CD, digital download, LP, streaming; Label: Speakerbox, Insanity	5	99	114	41	26	10	47
Juniper	Released: 19 September 2025; Format: Cassette, CD, digital download, LP, streaming; Label: Speakerbox, Insanity	13	—	—	—	—	10	—
"—" denotes album did not chart in that territory.

=== Extended plays ===
Title	EP details
Influence	Released: 21 July 2017; Format: CD, digital download, streaming; Label: Speakerbox, Insanity
Reminiscence	Released: 25 January 2019; Format: CD, digital download, streaming; Label: Speakerbox, Insanity
Perception	Released: 31 May 2019; Format: CD, digital download, streaming; Label: Speakerbox, Insanity

=== Singles ===
Title	Year	Peak chart positions			Certifications	Album
Title	Year	UK Asian	UK Down.	UK Sales	Certifications	Album
"New Manhattan"	2016	—	—	—		Influence
"Sinatra"	2016	—	—	—		Influence
"Bad Feeling"	2017	—	—	—		Influence
"Don't Let Me Down"	2018	—	—	—		Reminiscence
"Two Nights"	2019	19	—	—		Reminiscence
"Hurts"	2019	19	—	—		Perception
"Since I Left You"	2019	3	—	—		Perception
"London Mine"	2019	14	—	—		Perception
"Yah / Element (Medley)"	2019	—	—	—		Non-album singles
"Early" (featuring Jafaris)	2019	1	—	—		Non-album singles
"Anyone But Me"	2020	1	—	—		Non-album singles
"You & Me Song"	2020	—	96	99		Non-album singles
"Looking for a 10" (with Fraser T. Smith)	2021	—	—	—		Produced By EP
"Feet Don't Fail Me Now"	2021	1	29	30	BPI: Silver	Skin
"Skin"	2021	—	—	—		Skin
"When You Were Mine"	2021	1	46	48	BPI: Silver	Skin
"Trouble"	2021	2	—	—		Skin
"19th Floor"	2022	—	—	—		Skin
"Pass the Salt" (featuring Vince Staples)	2025	—	—	—		Juniper
"Mathematics" (featuring Kano)	2025	2	—	—		Juniper
"I Know You'd Kill"	2025	4	—	—		Juniper
"Carmen"	2025	7	—	—		Juniper
"Perfect Crime"	2025	—	—	—		Juniper
"Somebody To You"	2025	—	—	—		Juniper
"Fade Your Heart"	2025	—	—	—		Juniper
"—" denotes a recording that did not chart or was not released in that territory.

=== As featured artist ===
List of singles, showing year released and album name
Title	Year	Album
"How I've Been" (Swindle featuring Jnr Williams, Joy Crookes, Kojey Radical and Loyle Carner)	2021	The New World
"Strength (R U Ready)" (The Blessed Madonna featuring Joy Crookes)	2024	Godspeed
"Always on Your Side" (Bonobo featuring Joy Crookes)	2026	Distance in Static

== Filmography ==
=== Film ===
Year	Title	Role	Notes	Ref.
2025	Ish	Samira		

== Awards and nominations ==
Organization	Year	Category	Nominated work	Result	Ref.
BBC	2019	Sound of 2020	Herself	Fourth	
Brit Awards	2020	Rising Star	Herself	Nominated	
MTV UK	2020	Push One to Watch	Herself	Nominated	
UK Music Video Awards	2021	Best Pop Video – UK	"Feet Don't Fail Me Now"	Nominated	
UK Music Video Awards	2021	Best Wardrobe Styling in a Video	"Feet Don't Fail Me Now"	Won	
UK Music Video Awards	2021	Best Hair & Makeup in a Video	"Feet Don't Fail Me Now"	Won	
MOBO Awards	2021	Best Newcomer	Herself	Nominated	
BBC Radio 1	2021	Hottest Record of the Year	"When You Were Mine"	Second	
Brit Awards	2022	Best New Artist	Herself	Nominated	
Brit Awards	2022	Best Pop/R&B Act	Herself	Nominated	
Mercury Prize	2022	Album of the Year	Skin	Nominated	
