= 2024 in rhythm and blues =

This article summarizes the events, album releases, and album release dates in rhythm and blues for the year 2024.

== Events ==
=== January ===
- On January 5, The Recording Academy announced the 2024 Lifetime Achievement Award Honorees including Donna Summer, Gladys Knight, and The Clark Sisters. On the same day, Del Palmer died at the age of 71.
- On January 6, the 38th Golden Disc Awards were held. NewJeans won Song of the Year for "Ditto". Zerobaseone won Album Bonsang for Youth in the Shade. NCT Dream won Album Bonsang for ISTJ.
- On January 10, the 13th Circle Chart Music Awards were held. NCT Dream won Digital Album of the Year for ISTJ. Zerobaseone won Rookie Album of the Year for Youth in the Shade.
- On January 19, Marlena Shaw died at the age of 84.
- On January 27, Barry Jenkins died at the age of 79.

=== February ===
- On February 4, the 66th Annual Grammy Awards were held. SZA won both Best R&B Song with "Snooze" and Best Progressive R&B Album with SOS. Coco Jones won Best R&B Performance with "ICU". PJ Morton and Susan Carol won Best R&B Traditional Performance with "Good Morning". Victoria Monét won Best New Artist and Best R&B Album with Jaguar II.
- On February 7, Henry Fambrough, of The Spinners, died at the age of 85.
- On February 11, Usher headlined the Super Bowl LVIII halftime show at Allegiant Stadium in Paradise, Nevada. Alicia Keys, Jermaine Dupri, H.E.R., will.i.am, Lil Jon, and Ludacris made guest appearances during the performance.
- On February 16, Etterlene DeBarge died at the age of 88.
- On February 17, the 31st Hanteo Music Awards were held. NCT Dream won Best Artist. Seventeen won Best Album. Jimin won the Global Artist Award for South America and Oceania. V won the Global Artist Award for Africa and Europe. B.I won the Hip-hop special award. Kiss of Life won Global Rising Artist. Billlie won Hanteo Choice K-pop Female Artist.
- On February 22, the 36th Lo Nuestro Awards were held. Kenia Os won New Artist – Female. Romeo Santos won Tropical Artist of the Year, Tropical Album of the Year for Fórmula, Vol. 3, and Tropical Collaboration of the Year for "El Pañuelo" with Rosalía.

=== March ===
- On March 2, the Brit Awards 2024 were held. Raye won British Artist of the Year, Best R&B Act, Best New Artist, Songwriter of the Year, British Album of the Year for My 21st Century Blues, and Song of the Year for "Escapism" with 070 Shake. Jungle won British Group. SZA won International Artist of the Year. On the same day, Blues Boy Willie died at the age of 77, and W. C. Clark died at the age of 84.
- On March 10, T. M. Stevens died at the age of 72.
- On March 12, Paul Nelson died at the age of 63.
- On March 16, the 55th NAACP Image Awards were held. Usher won the President's Award, Entertainer of the Year, and Outstanding Male Artist. Victoria Monét won Outstanding Album for Jaguar II, and Outstanding New Artist. H.E.R. won Outstanding Female Artist. Ciara and Chris Brown won Outstanding Duo, Group or Collaboration (Traditional) for "How We Roll". Chris Brown, Davido, and Lojay won Outstanding Duo, Group or Collaboration (Contemporary) and Outstanding Music Video/Visual Album for "Sensational". Tems won Outstanding International Song for "Me & U". Coco Jones and Justin Timberlake won Outstanding Soul/R&B Song for "ICU (Remix)". The Color Purple won Outstanding Soundtrack/Compilation Album.
- On March 18, Kevin Toney died at the age of 70.
- On March 22, the 2024 Global Awards were held. Raye won Best British Act and Best Pop.
- On March 24, the Juno Awards of 2024 were held. New West won Breakthrough Group of the Year. Karan Aujla won the Fan Choice Award. Amanda Marshall won Adult Contemporary Album of the Year for Heavy Lifting. Blue Moon Marquee won Blues Album of the Year for Scream, Holler & Howl. SZA won International Album of the Year for SOS. Dominique Fils-Aimé won Vocal Jazz Album of the Year for Our Roots Run Deep. TOBi won Rap Album/EP of the Year for Panic. Daniel Caesar won Contemporary R&B/Soul Recording of the Year for Never Enough. Aqyila won Traditional R&B/Soul Recording of the Year for "Hello".
- On March 30, Casey Benjamin died at the age of 45.

=== April ===
- On April 1, the 2024 iHeartRadio Music Awards were held. SZA won R&B Artist of the Year, Song of the Year for "Kill Bill", R&B Song of the Year for "Snooze", and R&B Album of the Year for SOS. Victoria Monét won Best New R&B Artist. NewJeans won Best New K-Pop Artist. V won Favorite Debut Album for Layover. Beyoncé won iHeartRadio Innovator.
- On April 5, Keith LeBlanc died at the age of 69.
- On April 7, Clarence "Frogman" Henry died at the age of 87.
- On April 11, Park Bo-ram died at the age of 30.
- On April 18, Mandisa died at the age of 47.
- On April 24, Mike Pinder died at the age of 82.
- On April 27, the 18th Metro FM Music Awards were held. Mthandazo Gatya won Best R&B for "In 2 U".

=== May ===
- On May 1, the APRA Music Awards of 2024 were held. Ziggy Alberts won Most Performed Blues & Roots Work for "Dancing in the Dark". JKing won Most Performed R&B / Soul Work for "Cinderella".
- On May 4, Ron Kavana died at the age of 73.
- On May 12, David Sanborn died at the age of 78.
- On May 14, Jimmy James died at the age of 83.
- On May 19, Peggi Blu died at the age of 77.

=== June ===
- On June 10, the 2024 Libera Awards were held. Christone "Kingfish" Ingram won Best Blues Record for Live In London. Sampha won Best R&B Record for Lahai. Betty Davis won Best Soul/Funk Record for Crashin' from Passion. The Blind Boys of Alabama won Best Spiritual Record for Echoes of the South. Sudan Archives and ODESZA won Best Remix for "Selfish Soul (ODESZA Remix)".
- On June 11, Victoria was killed at the age of 39.
- On June 13, Angela Bofill died at the age of 70.
- On June 30, the 2024 BET Awards were held. Victoria Monét won Video of the Year and the BET Her Award for "On My Mama". Usher won Best Male R&B/Pop Artist and the Lifetime Achievement Award. SZA won Best Female R&B/Pop Artist. Tyla won Best New Artist and Best International Act. Tems won the Dr. Bobby Jones Best Gospel/Inspirational Award for "Me & U". Beyoncé won the Viewer's Choice Award for "Texas Hold 'Em".

=== July ===
- On July 2, Tom Fowler died at the age of 73.
- On July 21, Evelyn Thomas died at the age of 70.
- On July 22, John Mayall died at the age of 90. On the same day, Duke Fakir died at the age of 88.
- On July 29, Joey Gilmore died at the age of 80.
- On July 30, Onyeka Onwenu died at the age of 72.
- On July 31, Arthur Miles died at the age of 74.

=== August ===
- On August 1, the AIR Awards of 2024 were held. WILSN won Best Independent Soul/R&B Album or EP for Those Days Are Over.
- On August 3, Shaun Martin died at the age of 45.
- On August 16, Luther Kent died at the age of 76.
- On August 21, it was announced that Cunnie Williams died at the age of 61.
- On August 31, Fatman Scoop died at the age of 56.

=== September ===
- On September 2, Pat Lewis died at the age of 76.
- On September 6, Johnny Thunder died at the age of 93.
- On September 8, Zoot Money died at the age of 82.
- On September 10, Frankie Beverly died at the age of 77. On the same day, Daddae died at the age of 60.
- On September 11, the 2024 MTV Video Music Awards were held. SZA won Best R&B for "Snooze".
- On September 15, Tito Jackson died at the age of 70.

=== October ===
- On October 7, Cissy Houston died at the age of 91.
- On October 16, Liam Payne died at the age of 31.
- On October 19, Dionne Warwick, Mary J. Blige, and Kool & the Gang were inducted into the Rock and Roll Hall of Fame.
- On October 24, the 2024 UK Music Video Awards were held. Ezra Collective and Yazmin Lacey won Best R&B/Soul Video – UK for "God Gave Me Feet for Dancing". Kamasi Washington, George Clinton, and D Smoke won Best R&B/Soul Video – International for "Get Lit". Matilda Mann won Best Pop / R&B / Soul Video – Newcomer for "Meet Cute". Jade won Best Editing in a Video for "Angel of My Dreams".

=== November ===
- On November 2, the 30th Annual South African Music Awards were held. Tyla won Female Artist of the Year, the International Achievement Award, and Newcomer of the Year. Lordkez won Best R&B/Soul Album for Testament.
- On November 3, Quincy Jones died at the age of 91. On the same day, the 46th Félix Awards were held. Rau Ze won R&B/Soul Album of the Year for Virer nos vies.
- On November 4, Tyka Nelson died at the age of 64.
- On November 10, the 2024 MTV Europe Music Awards were held. Tyla won Best R&B.
- On November 12, Coco Jones, Amanda Jones, and Autumn Rowe were named 2024's honorees for ASCAP Rhythm & Soul’s Women Behind the Music.
- On November 16, the 2024 Korea Grand Music Awards were held. Bibi and D.O. won Best R&B.
- On November 20, the 2024 ARIA Music Awards were held. Tkay Maidza won Best Soul/R&B Release for Sweet Justice. Mia Dyson won Best Blues & Roots Album for Tender Heart.
- On November 21, the Myx Music Awards 2024 were held. Josh Cullen and Al James won R&B Video of the Year for "Yoko Na".

=== December ===
- On December 12, the 2024 Billboard Music Awards were held. SZA won Top R&B Artist and Top R&B Female Artist. Tommy Richman won Top R&B Male Artist and Top R&B Song for "Million Dollar Baby". Bruno Mars won Top R&B Touring Artist. Chris Brown won Top R&B Album for 11:11.
- On December 17, Alfa Anderson died at the age of 78.
- On December 20, Sugar Pie DeSanto died at the age of 89.

== Released albums ==
=== January ===
Day	Artist(s)	Album	Record label(s)	Entering chart position
10	OnlyOneOf	Things I Can't Say Love	8D Entertainment	
10	Teezo Touchdown	How Do You Sleep At Night? With You	Not Fit For Society, RCA Records	
11	Matt Martians	Matt's Missing	5th Echelon Jet Repair	
12	Jeymes Samuel	The Book of Clarence (The Motion Picture Soundtrack)	Geneva Club, Roc Nation Records	
12	Kali Uchis	Orquídeas	Geffen	Debuted at No. 2 on the Billboard 200
12	Michael J. Woodard	MJW1	Unsub Records	
12	Nailah Hunter	Lovegaze	Fat Possum	
12	Samaria	Even Paradise Rains	RCA	
19	UMI	Talking To The Wind	Self-released	
26	Emotional Oranges & Nonso Amadi	Blended	Avant Garden	
26	Sy Smith	Until We Meet Again	The Foreign Exchange Music	

=== February ===
Day	Artist(s)	Album	Record label(s)	Entering chart position
2	Ryan Leslie	You Know My Speed	Black Phoenix Enterprises	
9	Brittany Howard	What Now	UMG	
9	DJ Harrison	Shades of Yesterday	Stones Throw	
9	Jessica Mauboy	Yours Forever	Warner Australia	Debuted at No. 10 on the ARIA Charts
9	Koryn Hawthorne	On God	Provident, Sony Music	
9	Mk.gee	Two Star & the Dream Police	R&R	
9	Usher	Coming Home	Mega, Gamma	Debuted at No. 2 on the Billboard 200
9	Various artists	The Tiger's Apprentice (soundtrack)	88rising	
9	Wejdene	W	Virgin Music France	
14	B. Smyth	Brandon	Bloom	
16	Jason Derulo	Nu King	Atlantic	Debuted at No. 82 on the Billboard 200
16	Jennifer Lopez	This Is Me... Now	Nuyorican, BMG	Debuted at No. 38 on the Billboard 200
16	Jordan Mackampa	Welcome Home, Kid!	AWAL	
16	Max	Love In Stereo	Colour Vision Records, Warner	
16	Paloma Faith	The Glorification of Sadness	Sony, RCA	Debuted at No. 2 on the UK Albums Chart
16	Pip Millett	Tell Jimmy	Believe UK	
16	Prince Royce	Llamada Perdida	Sony Latin, Smiling Prince Music	
16	Serpentwithfeet	Grip	Secretly Canadian	
19	Le Sserafim	Easy	Source, YG Plus, Geffen	Debuted at No. 8 on the Billboard 200
21	Erika de Casier	Still	4AD	
23	Ghetts	On Purpose, with Purpose	Ghetts Limited, Warner	Debuted at No. 29 on the UK Albums Chart
23	I Dont Know How but They Found Me	Gloom Division	Concord Records	
23	Rod Stewart & Jools Holland	Swing Fever	Warner	Debuted at No. 1 on the UK Albums Chart
26	Taeyong	Tap	SM, Kakao	
27	A. Chal	Espíritu	Gazi World	
29	Jacob Collier	Djesse Vol. 4	Hajanga	Debuted at No. 26 on the UK Albums Chart

=== March ===
Day	Artist(s)	Album	Record label(s)	Entering chart position
1	Eric Bellinger	The Rebirth 3: The Party & The Bedroom	All Wins, Compound Interest	
1	Faye Webster	Underdressed at the Symphony	Secretly Canadian	
1	Jade Novah	Where Have I Been?	Let There Be Art	
1	Ledisi	Good Life	Listen Back Entertainment, BMG	
5	Trevor Jackson	Heads Up	Born Art	
8	Ariana Grande	Eternal Sunshine	Republic Records	Debuted at No. 1 on the Billboard 200
15	Justin Timberlake	Everything I Thought It Was	RCA	Debuted at No. 4 on the Billboard 200
21	Seori	Fake Happy	Label Sayu	
22	Gary Clark Jr.	JPEG Raw	Warner	
22	Kenya Vaun	The Honeymoon Phase	300 Entertainment	
22	Matt Champion	Mika's Laundry	RCA	
22	SiR	Heavy	Top Dawg Entertainment, RCA	Debuted at No. 120 on the Billboard 200
22	Tyla	Tyla	FAX Records, Epic Records	Debuted at No. 24 on the Billboard 200
25	Illit	Super Real Me	Belift Lab, YG Plus	
25	NCT Dream	Dream()scape	SM, Kakao	
29	Beyoncé	Cowboy Carter	Parkwood, Columbia	Debuted at No. 1 on the Billboard 200
29	Buddy	Don't Forget To Breathe	Empire	
29	J-Hope	Hope on the Street Vol. 1	Big Hit	Debuted at No. 5 on the Billboard 200

=== April ===
Day	Artist(s)	Album	Record label(s)	Entering chart position
3	I.M	Off the Beat	Sony Music Korea	
3	Zeina	Eastend Confessions	Artist Partner Group	
5	Alice Russell	I Am	Tru Thoughts	
5	Bryson Tiller	Bryson Tiller	RCA Records	Debuted at No. 12 on the Billboard 200
5	Fabiana Palladino	Fabiana Palladino	Paul Institute, XL	
5	José James	1978	Rainbow Blonde	
5	Maggie Rose	No One Gets Out Alive	Big Loud	
5	Malcolm Todd	Sweet Boy	Columbia	
5	Marcus King	Mood Swings	Republic Records	
5	Pharrell Williams	Black Yacht Rock Vol. 1	Self-released	
5	Sheila E.	Bailar	Stiletto Flats, Sony Music	
5	Tori Kelly	Tori	Epic, Beautiful Mind Records	
5	Vory	Eros	Eros, Create Music Group	
10	Hikaru Utada	Science Fiction	Epic Japan, USM Japan	
11	Tini	Un Mechón de Pelo	5020, Sony Latin	
12	Amy Winehouse	Back to Black (Songs from the Original Motion Picture)	Island	
12	Baby Rose & BADBADNOTGOOD	Slow Burn	Secretly Canadian	
12	Diane Birch	Flying on Abraham	Legere	
12	DRAM	DRAM&B	Waver	
12	Elyanna	Woledto	SALXCO UAM	
12	Future & Metro Boomin	We Still Don't Trust You	Freebandz, Boominati, Epic, Republic	Debuted at No. 1 on the Billboard 200
12	Jean Deaux	Nowhere, Fast	Guin Records	
12	Meshell Ndegeocello	Red Hot & Ra: The Magic City	Red Hot Organization	
12	Nia Archives	Silence Is Loud	Hijinxx	Debuted at No. 16 on the UK Albums Chart
17	Ruger & Bnxn	RnB	Blown Boy, T.Y.E, Empire	
19	Blue Lab Beats	Blue Eclipse	Blue Adventure, Decca Records France	
19	Inayah	Wait, There's More	Inayahlator Enterprises, Empire	
19	Tei Shi	Valerie	Self-released	
22	Doyoung	Youth	SM, Kakao	
26	Céu	Novela	Urban Jungle Records, ONErpm	
26	Judith Hill	Letters from a Black Widow	Regime Music Group	
26	Ngaiire	Live at the Sydney Opera House	Dot Dash Records	
26	PartyNextDoor	PartyNextDoor 4	OVO Sound	Debuted at No. 10 on the Billboard 200
26	Sega Bodega	Dennis	Ambient Tweets	
26	Sinéad Harnett	Boundaries	Thairish Limited, Right Hand	
26	Yung Bleu	Jeremy	Vandross Music Group, Empire	Debuted at No. 51 on the Billboard 200

=== May ===
Day	Artist(s)	Album	Record label(s)	Entering chart position
2	Hyuna	Attitude	At Area	
3	4Batz	U Made Me a St4r	Gamma.	Debuted at No. 30 on the Billboard 200
3	Charlotte Day Wilson	Cyan Blue	Stone Woman, XL Recordings	
3	Kacy Hill	Bug	Mochi Headquarters, Nettwerk	
7	Doh Kyung-soo	Blossom	Company SooSoo, Dreamus	
9	Cosha	MurMurs	Ashtown Lane	
10	Andra Day	Cassandra (cherith)	Warner Records	
10	Gabrielle	A Place in Your Heart	Tag8 Music, BMG	Debuted at No. 30 on the UK Albums Chart
10	Grupo Frontera	Jugando a Que No Pasa Nada	Self-released	Debuted at No. 198 on the Billboard 200
10	Jordan Rakei	The Loop	Verve Forecast, Decca	Debuted at No. 36 on the UK Albums Chart
10	Kaash Paige	Catch Me While I Care	Self-released	
10	Nigel Hall & DJ Harrison	The Burning Bush: A Journey Through the Music of Earth, Wind & Fire	Regime Music Group	
10	Pokey LaFarge	Rhumba Country	New West	
10	Yaya Bey	Ten Fold	Big Dada	
13	Childish Gambino	Atavista	RCA	Debuted at No. 62 on the Billboard 200
17	Shaznay Lewis	Pages	1.9.7.5	
17	Vedo	Next Chapter	New Wav, Empire	
24	Nathy Peluso	Grasa	Sony Latin, 5020	
24	RM	Right Place, Wrong Person	Big Hit	Debuted at No. 5 on the Billboard 200
24	Sango	North Vol. 2	Self-released	
24	Shenseea	Never Gets Late Here	Rich Immigrants, Interscope Records	
29	Bobby V	Bobby V. Live in Concert	Veltree Music Group, Santi Music	
30	Omar Montes	Lagrimas De Un Maleante	Sony Music Entertainment US Latin	
31	Artms	DALL	Modhaus	
31	Ayra Starr	The Year I Turned 21	Mavin	Debuted at No. 195 on the Billboard 200
31	Durand Bernarr	En Route	Dsing Records, Create Music Group	
31	Kallitechnis	Mood Ring	Soul Over Ego	
31	Leigh-Anne	No Hard Feelings	Warner	
31	Swamp Dogg	Blackgrass: From West Virginia to 125th St.	Oh Boy Records	
31	Tanerélle	Electric Honey	Republic	

=== June ===
Day	Artist(s)	Album	Record label(s)	Entering chart position
7	Alicia Keys	Hell's Kitchen	Self-released	
7	Kaytranada	Timeless	RCA	Debuted at No. 28 on the Billboard 200
7	NxWorries	Why Lawd?	Stones Throw	Debuted at No. 104 on the Billboard 200
7	Tems	Born in the Wild	RCA, Since '93	Debuted at No. 56 on the Billboard 200
14	Bilal	Live at Glasshaus	Glasshaus Presents	
14	Cruza	Cruzafied	Def Jam	
14	Fana Hues	Moth	Sweet Virtue, Westminster Recordings, Bright Antenna Records	
14	Lalah Hathaway	Vantablack	Hathaway Entertainment, SRG-ILS	
14	Normani	Dopamine	RCA Records, Sony Music	Debuted at No. 91 on the Billboard 200
14	PJ Morton	Cape Town to Cairo	Morton Records, Empire	
14	Raveena	Where the Butterflies Go in the Rain	Moonstone Recordings, Empire	
14	Skaiwater	#Gigi	GoodTalk, Capitol Records	
21	Capella Grey	Vibe Responsibly, Vol.1	Allepac The Family, 10K Projects	
21	Daryl Hall	D	United Artists Productions	
21	Jeremy Pope	Last Name: Pope	Self-released	
21	Kehlani	Crash	Atlantic Records	Debuted at No. 25 on the Billboard 200
21	Lake Street Dive	Good Together	Self-released	
21	Lola Young	This Wasn't Meant for You Anyway	Island	Debuted at No. 16 on the UK Albums Chart; Debuted at No. 180 on the Billboard 200
21	Maeta	Endless Night	Roc Nation	
21	Victony	Stubborn	Encore Recordings	
26	Teenear	Never Met A Me	Slip-n-Slide Records	
28	Aaron Frazer	Into the Blue	Dead Oceans	
28	Hiatus Kaiyote	Love Heart Cheat Code	Brainfeeder, Ninja Tune	Debuted at No. 40 on the ARIA Charts
28	James Blake & Lil Yachty	Bad Cameo	Quality Control Music, Motown	
28	Keke Wyatt	Certified	Shanachie	
28	Lucky Daye	Algorithm	RCA, Keep Cool	
28	Marsha Ambrosius	Casablanco	Aftermath Records, Interscope Records	
28	Nathaniel Rateliff & the Night Sweats	South of Here	Stax Records	Debuted at No. 145 on the Billboard 200
28	Omar Apollo	God Said No	Warner	Debuted at No. 56 on the Billboard 200

=== July ===
Day	Artist(s)	Album	Record label(s)	Entering chart position
5	Eves Karydas	Burnt Tapes	Zeitgeist Records, Believe	Debuted at No. 23 on the ARIA Charts
6	Sault	Acts of Faith	Forever Living Originals	
9	Darien Brockington	Where Love Grows	Foreign Exchange Music	
10	Rema	Heis	Mavin, Jonzing, Interscope	
12	Berwyn	Who Am I	Columbia	
12	Enhypen	Romance: Untold	Belift Lab, Genie, Stone	Debuted at No. 2 on the Billboard 200
12	Kučka	Can You Hear Me Dreaming?	LuckyMe	
12	Tayla Parx	Many Moons, Many Suns	TaylaMade	
12	Tink	Winter's Diary 5	Winter's Diary, WD Records, Empire	Debuted at No. 140 on the Billboard 200
12	Zacari	Bliss	TDE	
16	Trevor Jackson	It's Complicated	Born Art	
19	Blk Odyssy	1-800 Fantasy	Earthchild, Empire	
19	Blxst	I'll Always Come Find You	Red Bull Records, Evgle	
19	Childish Gambino	Bando Stone & the New World	RCA	Debuted at No. 16 on the Billboard 200
19	Jimin	Muse	Big Hit	Debuted at No. 2 on the Billboard 200
26	Bryant Barnes	Vanity	Mercury	
26	Yemi Alade	Rebel Queen	Effyzzie Music	

=== August ===
Day	Artist(s)	Album	Record label(s)	Entering chart position
2	Elijah Blake	Elijah.	RKeyTek Music, MNRK Records	
2	Khalid	Sincere	Right Hand Music Group, RCA	Debuted at No. 43 on the Billboard 200
2	Moses Sumney	Sophcore	TunTum Records	
8	August 08	Pretend It's Okay	Def Jam, UMG	
9	Chlöe	Trouble in Paradise	Parkwood, Columbia	
9	Elles Bailey	Beneath the Neon Glow	Outlaw Music, Cooking Vinyl	Debuted at No. 12 on the UK Albums Chart
9	Kali Uchis	Orquídeas Parte 2	Capitol, UMG	
9	Niki	Buzz	88rising	
9	Rae Khalil	Crybaby	Ape Shit, Def Jam	
9	Ravyn Lenae	Bird's Eye	Atlantic Records	Debuted at No. 189 on the Billboard 200
15	Malia	Back in My Body	Self-released	
16	Skylar Simone	Shiver	Def Jam, UMG	
16	Tinashe	Quantum Baby	Nice Life	Debuted at No. 199 on the Billboard 200
19	Liniker	Caju	Self-released	
20	Rad Museum & Kid Milli	Rad Milli	You.will.knovv, Indigo Music	
22	Myke Towers	La Pantera Negra	One World, Warner	Debuted at No. 82 on the Billboard 200
23	Amanda Reifer	Island Files	Title 9, Atlantic Records	
23	Avery*Sunshine	So Glad to Know You	BigShine Recordings	
23	Body Meat	Starchris	Partisan Records	
23	Carol Biazin	No Escuro,	Universal Music	
23	Dhruv	Private Blizzard	RCA, Sony	
23	Eric Benét	Duets	JBR Creative Group	
23	Forest Claudette	& Stone Between	Warner Records	
23	LARA'	Luvology	Earthchild, Empire	
23	OG Parker	Moments	Ice Cream Sonics, Neutral Records, Empire	
23	Xavier Omär & ELHAE	Truth Be Told	XO Creative Club, Every Life Music, RBC, BMG	
26	Elsy Wameyo	Saint Sinner	Self-released	
26	Jaehyun	J	SM, Kakao	
28	Kehlani	While We Wait 2	Atlantic Records	
29	Syleena Johnson	Legacy	SJ Entertainment	
30	John Legend	My Favorite Dream	Republic	
30	Louis York	Songs With Friends	Weirdo Workshop	
30	Marques Houston	The Best Worst Year Ever.	Phoenix Music Group	
30	Muni Long	Revenge	Def Jam Recordings	
30	Olivia	You Are	Perfectly Pitched	
30	Tyrese	Beautiful Pain	Voltron Recordz, Create Music Group	

=== September ===
Day	Artist(s)	Album	Record label(s)	Entering chart position
2	Meshell Ndegeocello	No More Water: The Gospel of James Baldwin	Blue Note	
6	Durand Bernarr & Charlie Vettuno	Where In The World Is Carmen Randiego!?	DSING Records, Create Music Group	
6	Laila!	Gap Year!	IIIXL Studio	
6	Rini	Lucky 7	Warner	
6	Ye Ali	THJ Radio Vol. 1	TrapHouseJodeci Music Group, Create Music Group	
13	Fousheé	Pointy Heights	RCA, Trackmasters	
13	Jordin Sparks	No Restrictions	Cozy Touring, LBD	
13	Keshi	Requiem	Island	Debuted at No. 27 on the Billboard 200
13	Pia Mia	Anti Romantica	Cherry Pie Records, Treehouse Records	
13	Terrace Martin	Nintendo Soul	Lowly	
13	Yolanda Adams	Sunny Days	Epic	
16	Rosie Lowe	Lover, Other	Blue Flowers	
20	Jae Stephens	Sellout	Raedio, Def Jam	
20	Jaz Karis	Safe Flight	Carmen Inc., MNRK Records	
20	Orion Sun	Orion	Mom+Pop	
25	Kimbra	Idols & Vices (Vol. 1)	Self-released	
27	Bilal	Adjust Brightness	Self-released	
27	Dylan Sinclair	For the Boy in Me	Five Stone Records	
27	Gallant	Zinc.	Mom+Pop	
27	Leon Thomas	Mutt	EZMNY Records, Motown	Debuted at No. 161 on the Billboard 200
27	Mustafa	Dunya	Jagjaguwar	
27	Tommy Richman	Coyote	ISO Supremacy, Pulse	
27	Van Morrison	New Arrangements and Duets	Exile Productions	

=== October ===
Day	Artist(s)	Album	Record label(s)	Entering chart position
4	Dawn Richard & Spencer Zahn	Quiet in a World Full of Noise	Merge	
4	Jonah Yano	Jonah Yano & The Heavy Loop	Innovative Leisure	
4	Leon Bridges	Leon	Columbia	Debuted at No. 58 on the Billboard 200
4	Thee Sacred Souls	Got a Story to Tell	Daptone	
4	Thủy	Wings	Self-released	
8	Nicolay	Terra Firma	The Foreign Exchange Music	
11	Äyanna	About Ä Boy	Love Renaissance	
11	DeJ Loaf	End of Summer	Fomily Foundation, Sounds Like Home	
11	Dua Saleh	I Should Call Them	Ghostly International	
11	Elaine	Stone Cold Heart	Self-released	
11	October London	October Nights	Death Row, Gamma	
11	Rod Wave	Last Lap	Alamo	Debuted at No. 2 on the Billboard 200
11	Samara Joy	Portrait	Dear Beverly Music, Verve	
13	Gia Ford	Transparent Things	Chrysalis Records	
18	Audrey Nuna	Trench	Arista Records	
18	Black Hibiscus	Black Hibiscus	MNRK Records	
18	Boney James	Slow Burn	Concord Records	
18	CKay	Emotions	Warner Music Africa	
18	Jennifer Hudson	The Gift of Love	Interscope Records	Debuted at No. 160 on the Billboard 200
18	Joy Oladokun	Observations From a Crowded Room	Amigo Records, Verve Forecast, Republic	
18	King Pari	There It Goes	Stones Throw Records	
18	Maverick Sabre	Burn The Right Things Down	Famm	
18	Rag'n'Bone Man	What Do You Believe In?	Columbia	Debuted at No. 3 on the UK Albums Chart
25	Allen Stone	Mystery	ATO Records	
25	Elmiene	Anyway I Can	Polydor Records, Def Jam	
25	Jake Isaac	Benjamin	Nettwerk Music Group	
25	Ray BLK	A Forest Fire	Self-released	
25	Rejjie Snow	Peace 2 Da World	Honeymoon, +1	
25	Ruthven	Rough & Ready	Paul Institute	
25	Shigeto	Cherry Blossom Baby	Ghostly International	
29	Flying Lotus	Spirit Box	Warp	
30	John Park	Psst!	Music Farm, Kakao	
31	Kiana Ledé	Cut Ties	BMG	

=== November ===
Day	Artist(s)	Album	Record label(s)	Entering chart position
1	Autre Ne Veut	Love, Guess Who??	Rebel Bodies	
1	Braxton Cook	My Everything	Nettwerk	
1	Chase Atlantic	Lost in Heaven	Fearless, Concord	Debuted at No. 4 on the ARIA Charts
1	Contour	Take Off from Mercy	Mexican Summer	
1	Jacquees	Baby Making	Cash Money, Republic	
1	Robert Glasper	In December	Loma Vista	
1	Tuxedo (Jake One & Mayer Hawthorne)	Tuxedo IV	Funk On Sight, Stem	
8	Benji.	Love Gun 3	Guin Records	
8	by.ALEXANDER	Memories for Sale ---At---> 66 Greene St Soho NY	Self-released	
8	Denise Julia	Sweet Nothings (Chapter 2)	Sony Music Philippines	
8	Mac Ayres	Cloudy	Dixon Court, Stem	
13	Raiche	Making Room	Genre Defying, Atlantic	
15	070 Shake	Petrichor	Getting Out Our Dreams, Def Jam	
15	Adrian Younge	Linear Labs: São Paulo	Linear Labs	
15	Flo	Access All Areas	Island Records	Debuted at No. 3 on the UK Albums Chart; Debuted at No. 163 on the Billboard 200
15	Iamtheliving	Nebra Sky	Project35, Nettwerk	
15	Mary J. Blige	Gratitude	300	
15	Odeal	Lustropolis	OVMBR, Love Renaissance	
15	Rimon	Children of the Night	ALLE$ Recordings, Empire	
15	Shantel May	Triggered, but Here	MNRK Music Group	
22	Amber Mark	Loosies	Jasmine Music, PMR Records	
22	Eric Bellinger	It'll All Make Sense Later	All Wins Entertainment, FTS	
22	Jesse Baez	Henry	Universal Music México	
22	Michael Kiwanuka	Small Changes	Polydor Records	Debuted at No. 2 on the UK Albums Chart
22	Wizkid	Morayo	RCA, Starboy	Debuted at No. 98 on the Billboard 200
27	Jay B	Archive 1: [Road Runner]	Mauve Company	
29	Saygrace	New Age	Self-released	

=== December ===
Day	Artist(s)	Album	Record label(s)	Entering chart position
6	Ego Ella May	Fieldnotes: Complete	Self-released	
6	Elmiene	For The Deported	Polydor Records, Def Jam	
6	Karri	Late Nite Slider Music	PFL, Geffen	
6	Roy Woods	Rolling Stone	OVO, Santa Anna	
6	Smino	Maybe in Nirvana	Zero Fatigue	
13	Clara La San	Good Mourning	CLS, AWAL	
13	Mario	Glad You Came	New Citizen, Epic Records	
20	SZA	Lana	Top Dawg, RCA	
20	Tink	Lost Pages	Winter's Diary	

== Highest-charting songs ==
=== United States ===
R&B songs from any year which charted in the 2024 Top 40 of the Billboard Hot 100
Song	Artist	Project	Peak position
"Lose Control"	Teddy Swims	I've Tried Everything but Therapy (Part 1)	1
"Million Dollar Baby"	Tommy Richman	—N/a	2
"Timeless"	The Weeknd and Playboi Carti	Hurry Up Tomorrow	3
"Saturn"	SZA	Lana	6
"Water"	Tyla	Tyla	7
"Act II: Date @ 8"	4Batz featuring Drake	U Made Me a St4r	7
"Dancing in the Flames"	The Weeknd	—N/a	14
"The Boy Is Mine"	Ariana Grande	Eternal Sunshine	16
"Selfish"	Justin Timberlake	Everything I Thought It Was	19
"Made for Me"	Muni Long	Revenge	20
"Igual que un Ángel"	Kali Uchis and Peso Pluma	Orquídeas	22
"Eternal Sunshine"	Ariana Grande	Eternal Sunshine	23
"The Door"	Teddy Swims	I've Tried Everything but Therapy (Part 1)	24
"Bye"	Ariana Grande	Eternal Sunshine	25
"Don't Wanna Break Up Again"	Ariana Grande	Eternal Sunshine	28
"True Story"	Ariana Grande	Eternal Sunshine	30
"Devil Is a Lie"	Tommy Richman	—N/a	32
"On My Mama"	Victoria Monét	Jaguar II	33
"Intro (End of the World)"	Ariana Grande	Eternal Sunshine	38

== Highest first-week consumption ==
List of albums with the highest first-week consumption (sales + streaming + track equivalent), as of December 2024 in the United States
Number	Album	Artist	1st-week consumption	1st-week position	Refs
1	Eternal Sunshine	Ariana Grande	227,000	1	
2	We Still Don't Trust You	Future & Metro Boomin	127,500	1	
3	Last Lap	Rod Wave	127,000	2	
4	Coming Home	Usher	91,000	2	
5	Orquídeas	Kali Uchis	69,000	2	
6	Everything I Thought It Was	Justin Timberlake	67,000	4	
7	PartyNextDoor 4	PartyNextDoor	37,000	10	

== All critically reviewed albums ranked ==
=== Metacritic ===
Number	Artist	Album	Average score	Number of reviews	Reference
1	Berwyn	Who Am I	95	4 reviews	
2	Brittany Howard	What Now	88	16 reviews	
3	Kali Uchis	Orquídeas	88	14 reviews	
4	Yaya Bey	Ten Fold	88	8 reviews	
5	Fabiana Palladino	Fabiana Palladino	87	6 reviews	
6	Tems	Born in the Wild	86	7 reviews	
7	Elles Bailey	Beneath the Neon Glow	86	4 reviews	
8	Ayra Starr	The Year I Turned 21	85	5 reviews	
9	Swamp Dogg	Blackgrass: From West Virginia to 125th St.	85	5 reviews	
10	Ariana Grande	Eternal Sunshine	84	19 reviews	
11	Tyla	Tyla	84	10 reviews	
12	Gary Clark Jr.	JPEG Raw	84	8 reviews	
13	Thee Sacred Souls	Got a Story to Tell	84	4 reviews	
14	Ravyn Lenae	Bird's Eye	83	6 reviews	
15	Faye Webster	Underdressed at the Symphony	82	16 reviews	
16	Omar Apollo	God Said No	82	7 reviews	
17	Leon Bridges	Leon	80	10 reviews	
18	Aaron Frazer	Into the Blue	80	5 reviews	
19	Nia Archives	Silence Is Loud	78	12 reviews	
20	Wizkid	Morayo	78	4 reviews	
21	Tinashe	Quantum Baby	77	12 reviews	
22	NxWorries	Why Lawd?	77	6 reviews	
23	Serpentwithfeet	Grip	76	13 reviews	
24	Usher	Coming Home	76	9 reviews	
25	Hiatus Kaiyote	Love Heart Cheat Code	75	6 reviews	
26	James Blake & Lil Yachty	Bad Cameo	75	6 reviews	
27	Van Morrison	New Arrangements and Duets	74	4 reviews	
28	Childish Gambino	Bando Stone & the New World	72	11 reviews	
29	Normani	Dopamine	73	11 reviews	
30	Kehlani	Crash	73	8 reviews	
31	Erika de Casier	Still	73	7 reviews	
32	Lake Street Dive	Good Together	69	4 reviews	
33	Flo	Access All Areas	68	9 reviews	
34	Jennifer Lopez	This Is Me...Now	61	10 reviews	
35	Justin Timberlake	Everything I Thought It Was	51	17 reviews	

=== AnyDecentMusic? ===
Number	Artist	Album	Average score	Number of reviews	Reference
1	Michael Kiwanuka	Small Changes	8.1	23 reviews	
2	Brittany Howard	What Now	8.0	13 reviews	
3	Fabiana Palladino	Fabiana Palladino	7.9	7 reviews	
4	Kali Uchis	Orquídeas	7.8	16 reviews	
5	Nia Archives	Silence Is Loud	7.7	15 reviews	
6	Tyla	Tyla	7.7	6 reviews	
7	Faye Webster	Underdressed at the Symphony	7.6	18 reviews	
8	Leon Bridges	Leon	7.6	7 reviews	
9	Ariana Grande	Eternal Sunshine	7.5	18 reviews	
10	Mustafa	Dunya	7.5	6 reviews	
11	Omar Apollo	God Said No	7.4	5 reviews	
12	Ravyn Lenae	Bird's Eye	7.4	5 reviews	
13	Serpentwithfeet	Grip	7.1	9 reviews	
14	Normani	Dopamine	7.0	10 reviews	
15	Childish Gambino	Bando Stone & the New World	6.9	10 reviews	
16	Hiatus Kaiyote	Love Heart Cheat Code	6.9	10 reviews	
17	Tinashe	Quantum Baby	6.9	8 reviews	
18	Kehlani	Crash	6.8	8 reviews	
19	Flo	Access All Areas	6.7	8 reviews	
20	070 Shake	Petrichor	6.4	6 reviews	
21	Usher	Coming Home	6.1	7 reviews	
22	Justin Timberlake	Everything I Thought It Was	4.6	13 reviews	

== See also ==
- Previous article: 2023 in rhythm and blues
- Next article: 2025 in rhythm and blues
