= Mei Ehara =

Japanese interdisciplinary artist

- 江原茗一
- Born: Aichi, Japan
- Occupations: Singer-songwriter, artist, designer, filmmaker
- Website: eharamei.com

Mei Ehara (Japanese: 江原茗一, Hepburn: Ehara Mei) is a Japanese singer-songwriter, artist, designer, and filmmaker. She released her debut album, Sway, in 2017, followed by Ampersands in 2020. In 2025, she announced her first headlining tour in the United States, as well as appearances for the Fuji Rock Festival, Circle, and other music festivals, and in 2024, she was the supporting act for Faye Webster's Underdressed at the Symphony tour. In addition to her work in music and film, Ehara serves as the editor in chief of the literary magazine Sono.

== Early life and career ==
=== Music ===
Ehara was born in Aichi Prefecture. She became interested in music and film while enrolled in university. Under the name may.e, she self-released three albums from 2013–2014, after which she signed to the label Kakubarhythm and began releasing music under her real name, Mei Ehara. Her debut album under the Mei Ehara name, Sway, was released in 2017 and was produced by Kicell's Goemon Tsujimura.

In 2021, Ehara was featured on Webster's "Overslept," the tenth track on her 2021 album I Know I'm Funny Haha, and also made a Tokyo-based appearance in its music video. Webster stated that Ehara was "the biggest influence" on her album: "Mei Ehara was someone who I listened to literally every day last year. She taught me so much about songwriting and instrumentation, and I felt like if anyone were to be on the record, it had to be her." Three years later, in 2024, Ehara was the supporting act for Webster's Underdressed at the Symphony tour across the United States.

In 2022, Ehara released her second album, Ampersands. Three years later, in 2025, Ehara announced her first-ever headlining tour in the United States, coinciding with the September 12 release of her studio album, All About McGuffin. Ehara's first show was scheduled for September 23, at the Swedish American Hall in San Francisco, California. She was also announced on the lineups for the 2025 Fuji Rock Festival and Circle.

In addition to her own work, Ehara has collaborated with artists like Cornelius and many others. She additionally contributed to Hosono House Revisited for the fiftieth anniversary of Haruomi Hosono's debut album. In 2023, she performed a duo live concert with Fuyu ni Sawarete at La.mama, and in 2024, she performed another with Kakubarizm at WWW X—both in Shibuya of Tokyo, Japan. Also in 2024, Ehara was included on the lineup for Humanity #6, a music event to raise funds in support of those on the Gaza Strip.

=== Literature ===
Ehara is also the editor in chief of the magazine, Sono—where she writes fiction, poetry, and essays—as well as the interview series DONCAMATIQ (ドンカマティック) in collaboration with Chinese musician Oh Shu and Jun Fujimori of The Buffentment Group.

== Discography ==
=== Studio albums ===
- Sway (2017)
- Ampersands (2020)
- All About McGuffin (2025)
