= Fidelity (album) =

2026 album by Yaya Bey

Studio album by Yaya Bey
- Released: April 17, 2026
- Genre: R&B
- Length: 43:37
- Label: Drink Sum Wtr
- Producers: Yaya Bey; Exaktly

Yaya Bey chronology
| Do It Afraid (2025) | Fidelity (2026) |

Singles from Fidelity
- 1. "Blue" Released: February 18, 2026; 2. "Egyptian Musk" Released: March 18, 2026

Fidelity is an album by the American singer-songwriter Yaya Bey. It was released on April 17, 2026, through Drink Sum Wtr, following her 2025 album Do It Afraid. Bey wrote and produced the album, with Exaktly co-producing three tracks. The album was preceded by the singles "Blue" and "Egyptian Musk".

Fidelity received positive reviews from critics, who characterized it as an album with references to 1990s and 2000s R&B, soul, jazz, and reggae. Reviews also praised Bey's treatment of grief, privacy, and mortality.

== Background and release ==
Yaya Bey announced Fidelity on February 18, 2026, announcing that it would arrive on April 17 through Drink Sum Wtr. According to The Line of Best Fit, Fidelity was a companion piece to Do It Afraid and was written around reflections Bey had after that album's release.

The lead single, "Blue", was released with the announcement. Bey said it was the first song she wrote for the album and that its production reminded her of early-2000s pop and R&B. "Egyptian Musk", a collaboration with Queens reggae artist Nesta, was released on March 18, 2026. In its coverage of the single, Pitchfork wrote that Bey described the album as addressing grief over her father's death and the erosion of Black communities in New York through gentrification.

== Music and lyrics ==
Reviews described Fidelity as rooted in R&B. John Amen of The Line of Best Fit wrote that the album moves between 2000s R&B/pop and older R&B, and interpreted its lyrics through grief and ambivalence. For Pitchfork, Jayson Greene wrote that Fidelity is more "wistful and weightless" than Ten Fold (2024) and Do It Afraid, with Bey rapping less and singing more over keyboard sounds reminiscent of mid-1990s R&B.

John-Paul Shiver of Treble described the album as soul music with jazz, lovers rock, and 1990s R&B elements. Grant Sharples of Paste described its R&B, jazz, and reggae songs as meditations on mortality and brief romantic connections. AllMusic's Andy Kellman described Fidelity as a close companion to Do It Afraid that incorporates soul, funk, hip-hop, reggae, house, and drum and bass. Kellman also wrote that Bey wrote and produced the album, with Exaktly producing three tracks with her.

== Critical reception ==
Professional ratings
Aggregate scores
| Source | Rating |
|---|---|
| Metacritic | 83/100 |
Review scores
| Source | Rating |
| The Line of Best Fit | 7/10 |
| Paste | B |
| Pitchfork | 7.8/10 |

At Metacritic, which assigns a normalized rating out of 100 to reviews from professional publications, Fidelity received an average score of 83, based on six reviews, indicating "universal acclaim".

Jayson Greene, writing for Pitchfork, praised Bey's humor, vocal delivery, and production, saying that the album emphasizes her singing and detailed sound design. John Amen wrote in The Line of Best Fit that the album's melodies mainly serve Bey's performances and found the record effective overall, while considering it somewhat repetitive. Grant Sharples wrote in Paste that the album works best when its band arrangements and production details support Bey's voice, particularly on "Blue". In Treble, John-Paul Shiver wrote that the album shows Bey moving from mourning toward a larger form of lament. Andy Kellman, reviewing the album for AllMusic, described it as a close companion to Do It Afraid and part of Bey's creative upswing.

== Track listing ==
Fidelity track listing
| No. | Title | Writer(s) | Length |
|---|---|---|---|
| 1. | "Me and Mine" (featuring Samantha G. and Anastasia Antoinette) | Yaya Bey | 1:03 |
| 2. | "The Towns (Bella Noche Pt. 2)" | Bey; Exaktly | 2:33 |
| 3. | "The Great Migration" | Bey; Exaktly; Talu Green; Andrew Velez | 4:18 |
| 4. | "Forty Days" | Bey; Dre Wilson | 3:26 |
| 5. | "Higher" | Bey; Nate Jarvis; Spenser Williams | 3:39 |
| 6. | "Dream Girl (Lexapro Mix)" | Bey; Sweet Corey-Bey; Williams | 3:51 |
| 7. | "Freeze Flight Fawn" | Bey | 1:23 |
| 8. | "Slot Machines" (featuring Deem Spencer) | Bey; Deem Spencer | 2:45 |
| 9. | "Simp Daddy Line Dance" (featuring Exaktly) | Bey; Exaktly | 3:12 |
| 10. | "As the Ocean" | Bey | 2:43 |
| 11. | "Blue" | Bey | 2:50 |
| 12. | "Cup of Water" | Bey; Chris Martin; Velez; Wilson | 2:27 |
| 13. | "In the Middle" | Bey | 1:58 |
| 14. | "Egyptian Musk" (featuring Nesta) | Bey; Nesta | 3:31 |
| 15. | "The Breakdown" | Bey | 1:38 |
| 16. | "Who Are You" | Bey | 2:20 |
| Total length: | | | 43:37 |

== Personnel ==
Credits are adapted from Tidal.

- Yaya Bey – vocals, production, drums on "Cup of Water"
- Spenser Williams – mixing, bass on "Higher", guitar and synthesizer on "Dream Girl (Lexapro Mix)"
- Dave Kutch – mastering
- Samantha G. – additional vocals on "Me and Mine"
- Anastasia Antoinette – additional vocals on "Me and Mine"
- Exaktly – production on "The Towns (Bella Noche Pt. 2)" and "The Great Migration"
- Andrew Velez – trumpet on "The Great Migration" and "Cup of Water"
- Talu Green – djembe on "The Great Migration"
- Dre Wilson – bass "Forty Days" and "Cup of Water"
- Nate Jarvis – guitar on "Higher"
- Sweet Corey-Bey – bass on "Dream Girl (Lexapro Mix)"
- Deem Spencer – vocals on "Slot Machines"
- Justine Lee Hooper – flute on "Blue"
- DJ Premier – keyboards on "Cup of Water"
- Nesta – vocals on "Egyptian Mask"
