= Sleepazoid =

Australian rock band

sleepazoid
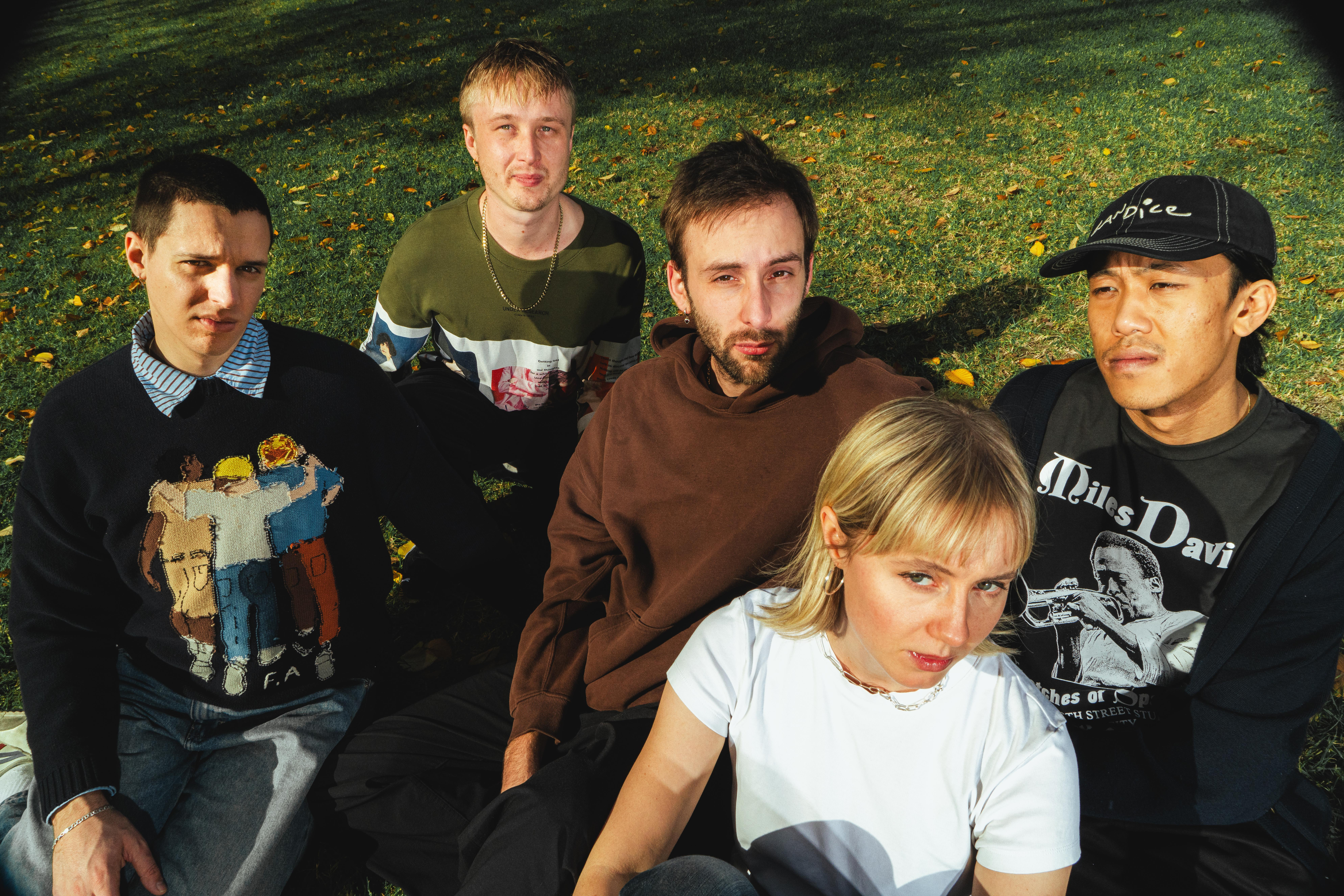
- From left: Josef Pabis, George Inglis, Luca Soprano, Nette France, Jim Duong.

Background information
- Origin: Melbourne, Victoria, Australia
- Genres: Alternative rock
- Years active: 2024–present
- Members: Nette France; Josef Pabis; Luca Soprano; George Inglis; Jim Duong

Sleepazoid is an Australian alternative rock band formed in Melbourne in 2024. The group consists of lead vocalist and guitarist Nette France, bassist Josef Pabis, drummer Luca Soprano, and guitarists George Inglis and Jim Duong. Their debut extended play, Running With The Dogs, combined elements of post-punk and shoegaze.

== History ==
Sleepazoid was formed in 2024 with two members of post-punk band Sputnik Sweetheart, vocalist Nette France and bassist Josef Pabis. After a successful first writing session, which produced their debut single "Rats", the band self-recorded and produced their first EP, Running With The Dogs, engineered by guitarist George Inglis in Prahran, Melbourne. After the release on 6 March 2025, they supported Faye Webster on shows across Australia, and played at Bigsound. They issued their second EP, New Age, produced by Jack Nigro, in February 2026.

== Artistry ==
The band's sound has been described as being a blend of "grunge grit, shoegaze atmospherics, and post-punk urgency, with frontwoman Nette France’s vocals cutting through the chaos."

== Discography ==
Extended plays

- Running With The Dogs (Surreal Sound, 6 March 2025)
- New Age (Surreal Sound, 5 February 2026)
