= Ten Fold =

Studio album by Yaya Bey
- Released: May 10, 2024
- Genre: Contemporary R&B
- Length: 39:17
- Language: English
- Label: Big Dada
- Producers: Audio Anthem; Boston Chery; Morgan Burrs; Jay Daniel; Exaktly; Flwr Chyld; Corey Fonville; Devonne Harris; Nigel Hall; Xavier Laster; Austin Marc; Karriem Riggins; Marcus Tenney

Yaya Bey chronology
Exodus the North Star (2023)	Ten Fold (2024)	Do It Afraid (2025)

Ten Fold is a 2024 studio album by American contemporary R&B artist Yaya Bey. Her first work without a specific theme or narrative, the album received positive reviews from critics. It has been promoted with single releases, music videos, and a concert tour.

== Reception ==
According to the review aggregator Metacritic, Ten Fold received "universal acclaim" based on a weighted average score of 89 out of 100 from seven critic scores.

Editors at AllMusic rated this album 4.5 out of 5 stars, with critic Andy Kellman writing that "Ten Fold sidles up with a relaxed soul-jazz groove for Yaya Bey to partially summarize what she's been through since the release of her first Big Dada album" that makes an album that "couldn't feel more personal, from the in-the-moment experiential songwriting to sampled and recorded appearances from her father, Juice Crew associate Grand Daddy I.U." A review of the notable releases of the week in BrooklynVegan included Ten Fold with a mixing o genres and themes that and ended his review: "Everything Yaya does on this album sounds cool and confident, from the constant genre-blurring to the way she delivers even some of the most dreadful topics with a sense of humor. It's an album that's deceptively chill, with much more than meets the eye (or ear) on a cursory listen." Shahzaib Hussain reviewed this album at Clash Music, where he rated it an 8 out of 10, summing up, "Bey channels the destabilising loss of her father and its attendant grief into something transcendent yet eminently relatable. Ten Fold, like the best journeying album, takes you along for the ride whilst serenading your anguish."

In i, Emily Bootle called this release "wonderfully cathartic" but also able to include optimism. Noah Barker of The Line of Best Fit rated Ten Fold an 8 out of 10, stating that it displays "Bey's talent as an instrumental storyteller; genres are sequenced and held for their parts, yet respected like caged animals" and that "she's a voice for all environments, a chameleon turning the world around it a different shade". At musicOMH, Ben Devlin rated Ten Fold 4 out of 5 stars and called this "a series of relatively brief songs about self-worth, grief and solidarity".

Kitty Empire of The Observer rated Ten Fold 4 out of 5 stars for pairing "catchy dancefloor bangers alongside soulful odes", resulting in an album that "is just as free-ranging, and as catchy, as" Bey's 2022 release North Star. Editors at Pitchfork included this among a list of eight albums to listen to this week due to its "R&B earworms" and they scored this release 8.4 out of 10, declaring it among the Best New Music, with critic Jessica Kariisa stating that "Bey deepens her connection to homespun funk and R&B while transforming grief, insecurities, and depletion into a full embrace of life" with songs that are "snapshots of an artist moving through loss as she navigates financial and emotional precarity and the vicissitudes of romance". Rolling Stone Australia's Sarah Downs authored a 2024 profile on Bey that characterized this album as "a dazzling and diverse collection that further solidifies her position as one of R&B's most promising rising stars". Margaret Farrell gave this work an A in Spin for Bey's "life-affirming" expression and "nourishing voice" that is supported by solid production.

=== Year-end lists ===
Select year-end rankings for Ten Fold
Publication/critic	Accolade	Rank	Ref.
AllMusic	AllMusic's 100 Favorite Albums of 2024	-	
Paste	100 Best Albums of 2024	35	
Time Out	The Best Albums of 2024	21	

== Track listing ==
Ten Fold track listing
No.	Title	Writer(s)	Producer(s)	Length
1.	"Crying Through My Teeth"	Hidaiyah Bey; Corey Fonville	Fonville; Devonne Harris	2:20
2.	"The Evidence"	Bey; Fonville	Fonville	2:40
3.	"Chrysanthemums"	Bey; Fonville; Nigel Hall	Fonville; Hall	2:27
4.	"Sir Princess Bad Bitch"	Bey; Fonville; Harris	Fonville; Harris	2:38
5.	"East Coast Mami"	Bey; Rafael Brown; Karriem Riggins	Audio Anthem; Riggins	2:31
6.	"Chasing the Bus"	Bey; Austin Marc	Marc	3:08
7.	"All Around Los Angeles"	Bey; Flwr Chyld	Flwr Chyld	2:37
8.	"Slow Dancing in the Kitchen"	Bey; Jay Daniel	Daniel	2:19
9.	"So Fantastic" (featuring Grand Daddy I.U.)	Bey; Boston Chery	Chery	1:10
10.	"Eric Adams in the Club" (featuring Exaktly)	Bey; Zachary Thomas	Exaktly	2:16
11.	"Me and All My Niggas"	Bey; Fonville	Fonville	1:54
12.	"Iloveyoufrankiebeverly"	Bey; Fonville; Harris; Andrew Randazzo	Fonville; Harris	3:02
13.	"Career Day"	Bey; Fonville	Fonville; Morgan Burrs	2:19
14.	"Carl Thomas Sliding Down the Wall"	Bey; Fonville	Fonville	2:20
15.	"Yvette's Cooking Show"	Bey; Fonville; Xavier Laster; Marcus Tenney	Fonville; Laster; Tenney	3:29
16.	"Let Go"	Bey; Daniel	Daniel	1:58
Total length:				39:17

== Personnel ==
Musicians

- Hidaiyah Bey – vocals
- Corey Fonville – drums (tracks 3, 4, 12, 13, 15), keyboard bass (4), bass (13)
- Nigel Hall – keyboards (track 3)
- DJ Harrison – keyboards (track 4), piano (12)
- Karriem Riggins – drums (track 5)
- Andrew Randazzo – bass (track 12)
- Morgan Burrs – guitar, keyboards (track 13)
- Tennishu – horn (track 15)
- Soundgenesius – SP-404 (track 15)

Additional contributors

- Max Gilkes – mastering
- Spenser Williams – mixing
- Jade Ping – graphic design
- Nikita Freyemuth – photography

== See also ==
- 2024 in American music
- 2024 in rhythm and blues music
- List of 2024 albums
