= Do It Afraid =

2025 studio album by Yaya Bey

Studio album by Yaya Bey
- Released: June 20, 2025
- Genre: R&B
- Length: 46:14
- Label: Drink sum wtr

Yaya Bey chronology
Ten Fold (2024)	Do It Afraid (2025)	Fidelity (2026)

Singles from Do It Afraid
- 1. "Merlot and Grigio" Released: March 26, 2025; 2. "Dream Girl" Released: April 23, 2025; 3. "Wake Up B*tch" Released: April 23, 2025; 4. "Raisins" Released: May 22, 2025

Do It Afraid (stylized in lowercase) is a studio album by the American singer-songwriter Yaya Bey. It was released on June 20, 2025, through Drink Sum Wtr. The album followed Ten Fold (2024) and was promoted by the singles "Merlot and Grigio", "Dream Girl", "Wake Up B*tch", and "Raisins".

The album received generally positive reviews from music critics, who characterized it as an R&B-rooted album that moved through rap, soul, and dance styles

== Background and release ==
Bey released "Merlot and Grigio", featuring Father Philis, on March 26, 2025. On April 23, 2025, she announced Do It Afraid as the follow-up to Ten Fold, with a June 20 release date through Drink Sum Wtr, and released "Dream Girl" and "Wake Up B*tch" as singles. "Raisins" was released as the final single before the album. The album was released on Bandcamp on June 20, 2025.

== Music and lyrics ==
Reviewers described Do It Afraid as stylistically broad. Stephen Kearse of Pitchfork wrote that the album moves from dance tracks to R&B and rap, and described its arrangements as built around keys, strings, horns, and light percussion. He identified lovers rock, soca, and house elements in the dance tracks, and wrote that the lyrics concern fear, joy, romance, work, and money. Adam Blyweiss of Treble described the album as grounded in neo soul while moving into rap, hip house, soca, and dub.

== Critical reception ==
Professional ratings
Review scores
Source	Rating
Beats Per Minute	80%
The Line of Best Fit	8/10
Pitchfork	7.5/10

Kearse wrote that the album's looser structure lacked some of the "snap and verve" of Ten Fold, but found warmth in its open-air arrangements and described Bey's performance as less divided between rapping for bravado and singing for vulnerability than on her earlier work. Blyweiss described Do It Afraid as "mixtape-like" and wrote that its sequencing and production made it feel less like a conventional album than a winding trip through different parts of Bey's identity.

Chase McMullen of Beats Per Minute wrote that the album addresses fear and catharsis, and described its production roster, which includes BadBadNotGood, Exaktly, and Butcher Brown, as Bey's broadest group of collaborators to that point. John Amen of The Line of Best Fit called the album "enchantingly mellow" and wrote that its references to 1970s and 1980s R&B, hip-hop, soul, jazz, and pop were made into a coherent sound. Bandcamp Daily featured Do It Afraid as Album of the Day; Rae-Aila Crumble wrote that the album combines Bey's R&B with Caribbean styles including soca and reggae.

== Track listing ==
Track listing adapted from Bandcamp and Pitchfork.

Do It Afraid track listing
No.	Title	Notes	Length
1.	"Wake Up B*tch"		1:52
2.	"End of the World"	featuring Nigel Hall and Butcher Brown	4:30
3.	"Real Yearners Unite"		2:56
4.	"Cindy Rella"		2:51
5.	"Raisins"		2:41
6.	"Spin Cycle"		3:31
7.	"Dream Girl"		2:01
8.	"Merlot and Grigio"	featuring Father Philis	3:26
9.	"Breakthrough"		2:17
10.	"A Surrender"		2:27
11.	"In a Circle"		2:25
12.	"Aye Noche"	featuring Rahrah Gabor and Exaktly	2:26
13.	"No for Real, WTF?"		3:14
14.	"Blicky"		3:04
15.	"Ask the Questions"		1:52
16.	"Bella Noches Pt. 1"		2:05
17.	"A Tiny Thing That's Mine"		0:43
18.	"Choice"		1:53
