= Millionaire's Club =

The Millionaire's Club was a professional wrestling stable in World Championship Wrestling (WCW) in 2000.

Millionaire's Club may also refer to:

- The United States Senate or more broadly the United States Congress
- Millionaire's Club International, Inc., a matchmaking company founded by Patti Stanger

== See also ==
- Atlanta Millionaires Club, a 2019 album by Faye Webster
- Monopoly Millionaires' Club, a U.S. multistate lottery drawing game
- Secret Millionaires Club, an American educational animated series
