= Lettuce (band) =

American funk band

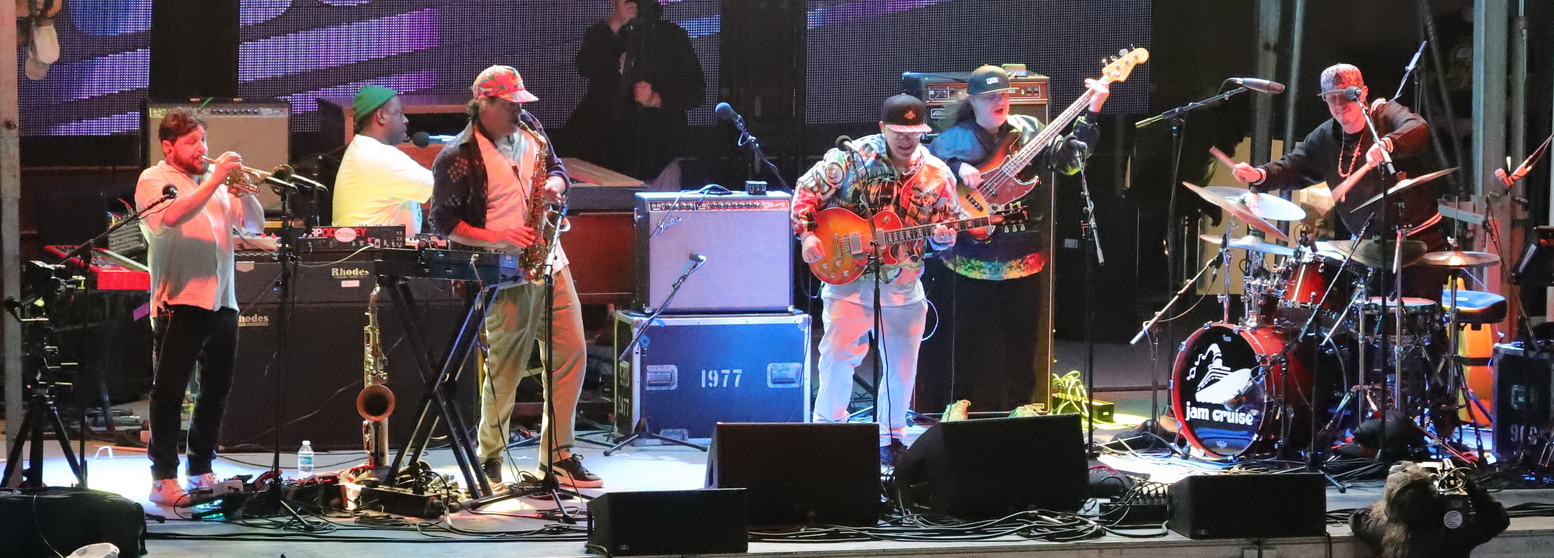
- Lettuce performing in 2023

Background information
- Origin: Boston, Massachusetts, U.S.
- Genres: Funk, jazz
- Years active: 1992–present
- Labels: Lettuce, Round Hill, Royal Family, Velour
- Members: Adam Deitch; Erick "Maverick" Coomes; Adam "Shmeeans" Smirnoff; Ryan Zoidis; Nigel Hall; Eric "Benny" Bloom
- Past members: Jeff Bhasker; Sam Kininger; Rashawn Ross; Eric Krasno; Neal Evans
- Website: lettucefunk.com

Lettuce is a North American funk band originating from Boston, Massachusetts in 1992. Its members are guitarist Adam "Shmeeans" Smirnoff, Nigel Hall (keyboards, Hammond B-3 organ, piano, vocals), Adam Deitch (drums/percussion), Erick "Maverick" Coomes (bass), Ryan Zoidis (saxophone) and Eric "Benny" Bloom (trumpet).

== History ==
Lettuce began in the summer of 1992, when all of its members attended a music program at Berklee College of Music in Boston, Massachusetts as teenagers. Brought together by the influence of various funk bands including Herbie Hancock, Earth, Wind and Fire, and Tower of Power, the band jammed throughout that summer before going their separate ways.

In the fall of 1994, the band reconvened as undergrads at Berklee and attempted to play at various Boston jazz clubs, walking in and asking the club owners and other musicians if they would "let us play", giving birth to the name Lettuce. Michael Butler played keyboards with the band early on and then Jeff Bhasker took on the role. When he left, Neal Evans joined.

Mainly from word of mouth, Lettuce developed strong followings in New York City, San Francisco, Chicago, and Tokyo. They released their first CD, Outta Here, in 2002, followed by their Live in Tokyo album recorded at the Blue Note in 2003.

In 2008, Lettuce released their second album, entitled Rage!. Drawing heavily from many of the leaders of the 1970s funk movement, Rage! features covers of Curtis Mayfield's "Move on Up" and Charles Wright & the Watts 103rd Street Rhythm Band's "Express Yourself".

In 2011, Lettuce played on the Royal Family Ball tour with their brother band, Soulive, and was accompanied at select shows by Rashawn Ross of the Dave Matthews Band. During this tour, they began playing new songs that would be featured on the band's next album, Fly!, in 2012.

Many of Lettuce's members have had success in other areas of the music industry. Krasno and Evans are members of the jazz/organ trio Soulive. Zoidis is a former and founding member of the Rustic Overtones. Coomes is a session bass player and has toured with Britney Spears and The Game. Deitch is a producer who also plays with Break Science, and he has worked with John Scofield and Wyclef Jean. Smirnoff has toured with Lady Gaga and Robert Randolph and the Family Band. In addition to playing with Lettuce, Ross has been a full-time member of the Dave Matthews Band since 2010.

Lettuce played with the Soul Rebels Brass Band on Jam Cruise 2013. The band's album Crush was released in November 2015 and reached number one on the U.S. Jazz Albums chart.

In 2020, Lettuce's album Elevate was nominated for a Grammy for Best Contemporary Instrumental Album.

== Band members ==
=== Current members ===
- Erick "Maverick" Coomes – bass guitar (1992–present)
- Adam Deitch – drums, percussion (1992–present)
- Adam "Shmeeans" Smirnoff – guitar (1992–present)
- Ryan Zoidis – alto sax, baritone saxophone, tenor saxophone (1992–present)
- Nigel Hall – vocals, Hammond B-3 organ, Clavinet, piano (2006–present)
- Eric "Benny" Bloom – trumpet (2011–present)

=== Former members ===
- Sam Kininger – alto saxophone, tenor saxophone (1992–2010)
- Eric Krasno – guitar (1992–2015)
- Jeff Bhasker – keyboards, organ (1994–2002)
- Neal Evans – Hammond B-3 organ, Clavinet, piano (2002–2017)
- Rashawn Ross – trumpet (2003–2011)

== Discography ==
=== Studio albums ===
Year	Details	Peak chart positions	
Year	Details	U.S. Jazz	U.S. Heat
2002	Outta Here: Released: July 16, 2002; Label: Velour Recordings	—	—
2008	Rage!: Released: April 18, 2008; Label: Velour Recordings	—	—
2012	Fly!: Released: June 19, 2012; Label: Velour Recordings	6	20
2015	Crush: Released: November 6, 2015; Label: Lettuce Records	1	5
2016	Mt. Crushmore: Released: November 11, 2016; Label: Lettuce Records	—	—
2019	Elevate: Released: June 14, 2019; Label: Lettuce Records	—	—
2020	Resonate: Released: May 8, 2020; Label: Round Hill Records	—	—
2022	Unify: Released: June 3, 2022; Label: Round Hill Records	—	—
2025	Cook: Released: December 3, 2025; Label: Lettuce Records	—	—

=== Live albums ===
Year	Details
2004	Live at Blue Note Tokyo: Released: October 25, 2004; Label: KUFALA Recordings
2017	Witches Stew: Released: October 13, 2017; Label: Lettuce Records
2023	Live In Amsterdam: Released: August 18, 2023; Label: Lettuce Records
