= Lovegaze =

Studio album by Nailah Hunter
- Released: January 12, 2024
- Genre: Alt-pop; new-age; art pop
- Length: 40:39
- Label: Fat Possum
- Producer: Cicely Goulder

Nailah Hunter chronology
| Forest Dwelling (2022) | Lovegaze (2024) |

Lovegaze is the debut album by American singer and harpist Nailah Hunter, released on January 12, 2024, through Fat Possum Records. It was produced by Cicely Goulder and received acclaim from critics.

== Background and recording ==
Hunter wrote and recorded the album in England with producer Cicely Goulder, and also collaborated with electronic music composer Ben Lukas Boysen.

== Critical reception ==
Professional ratings
Aggregate scores
| Source | Rating |
|---|---|
| Metacritic | 83/100 |
Review scores
| Source | Rating |
| AllMusic | 4/5 stars |
| Clash | 6/10 |
| Mojo | 4/5 stars |
| Paste | 8.0/10 |
| Pitchfork | 7.9/10 |
| Uncut | 8/10 |

Lovegaze received a score of 83 out of 100 on review aggregator Metacritic based on seven critics' reviews, indicating "universal acclaim". Uncut felt that "whether deployed as a meditation aid or an object for more focused listening, Lovegaze succeeds handily", while Mojo called it "a treat, like listening to an oracle from the depths of a digital cave". AllMusic's Paul Simpson found that the album "places more of a focus on Hunter as a singer and songwriter rather than a harpist", in which regard she has "grown considerably as a vocalist", and also that it "demonstrates Hunter's range from soundscape weaver to art-pop maverick, and her music is never less than bewildering".

Paste's Devon Chodzin wrote that on Lovegaze, Hunter's "ambient impulses are foundational but nowhere near the totality" as she "assembles the most bewitching elements of soul and folk to create something transfixing, otherworldly and almost New Age in style". Madison Bloom of Pitchfork found that Hunter "emerges as a dexterous player and loose but imaginative composer" as "she cleverly incorporates elements of contemporary R&B, pop, and jazz". Matthew Neale, reviewing the album for Clash, described it as a "promising debut album, then, with scintillating nods to the artist Hunter might yet become, one perhaps ready to write her own mythologies".

== Track listing ==
Lovegaze track listing
| No. | Title | Length |
|---|---|---|
| 1. | "Strange Delights" | 3:40 |
| 2. | "Through the Din" | 3:43 |
| 3. | "Finding MIrrors" | 3:42 |
| 4. | "000" | 3:55 |
| 5. | "Lovegaze" | 4:51 |
| 6. | "Bleed" | 3:49 |
| 7. | "Adorned" | 4:12 |
| 8. | "Cloudbreath" | 3:07 |
| 9. | "Garden" | 4:40 |
| 10. | "Into the Sun" | 5:00 |
| Total length: | | 40:39 |
