= Atlanta Millionaires Club =

Studio album by Faye Webster
- Released: May 24, 2019
- Genres: Alternative country; R&B; indie folk; folk pop
- Length: 31:45
- Label: Secretly Canadian
- Producers: Faye Webster; Matt Martin; Drew Vandenberg

Faye Webster chronology
Faye Webster (2017)	Atlanta Millionaires Club (2019)	I Know I'm Funny Haha (2021)

Atlanta Millionaires Club is the third studio album by American musician Faye Webster. It was released on May 24, 2019, by Secretly Canadian.

== Critical reception ==
Professional ratings
Aggregate scores
Source	Rating
AnyDecentMusic?	7.6/10
Metacritic	81/100
Review scores
Source	Rating
AllMusic	3.5/5 stars
Clash	8/10
Consequence of Sound	A−
Mojo	4/5 stars
NME	4/5 stars
The Observer	4/5 stars
Pitchfork	7.8/10
Q	4/5 stars
Rolling Stone	4/5 stars
Uncut	7/10

The critical aggregator website Metacritic awarded Atlanta Millionaires Club a score of 81 out of 100 based on reviews by 15 critics, indicating "universal acclaim".

Anna Gaca of Pitchfork said "Few R&B albums have a pedal steel; few alt-country albums have a rap feature. Faye Webster's Atlanta Millionaires Club somehow has all of the above. Even stranger, she manages to smooth these apparent contradictions into serene folk-pop with a mellow soul tinge." Writing for Rolling Stone, Angie Martoccio noted that "The 21-year-old's Atlanta roots allow her to effortlessly coalesce R&B with indie-folk."

== Accolades ==
Publication	Accolade	Rank	Ref.
Consequence of Sound	Top 50 Albums of 2019	16	
Gorilla vs. Bear	Top 50 Albums of 2019	14	
Gothamist	Top 25 Albums of 2019	11	
Noisey	Top 100 Albums of 2019	95	
Paste	Top 50 Albums of 2019	10	
The Wild Honey Pie	Top 30 Albums of 2019	10	

== Track listing ==
No.	Title	Length
1.	"Room Temperature"	4:04
2.	"Right Side of My Neck"	2:33
3.	"Hurts Me Too"	3:21
4.	"Pigeon"	2:38
5.	"Jonny"	3:46
6.	"Kingston"	3:22
7.	"Come to Atlanta"	2:32
8.	"What Used to Be Mine"	3:08
9.	"Flowers" (featuring Father)	4:21
10.	"Jonny (Reprise)"	2:00
Total length:		31:45

== Charts ==
Chart (2019)	Peak position
US Heatseekers Albums (Billboard)	25
