= Berwyn (musician) =

Trinidad-born rapper, producer, and songwriter

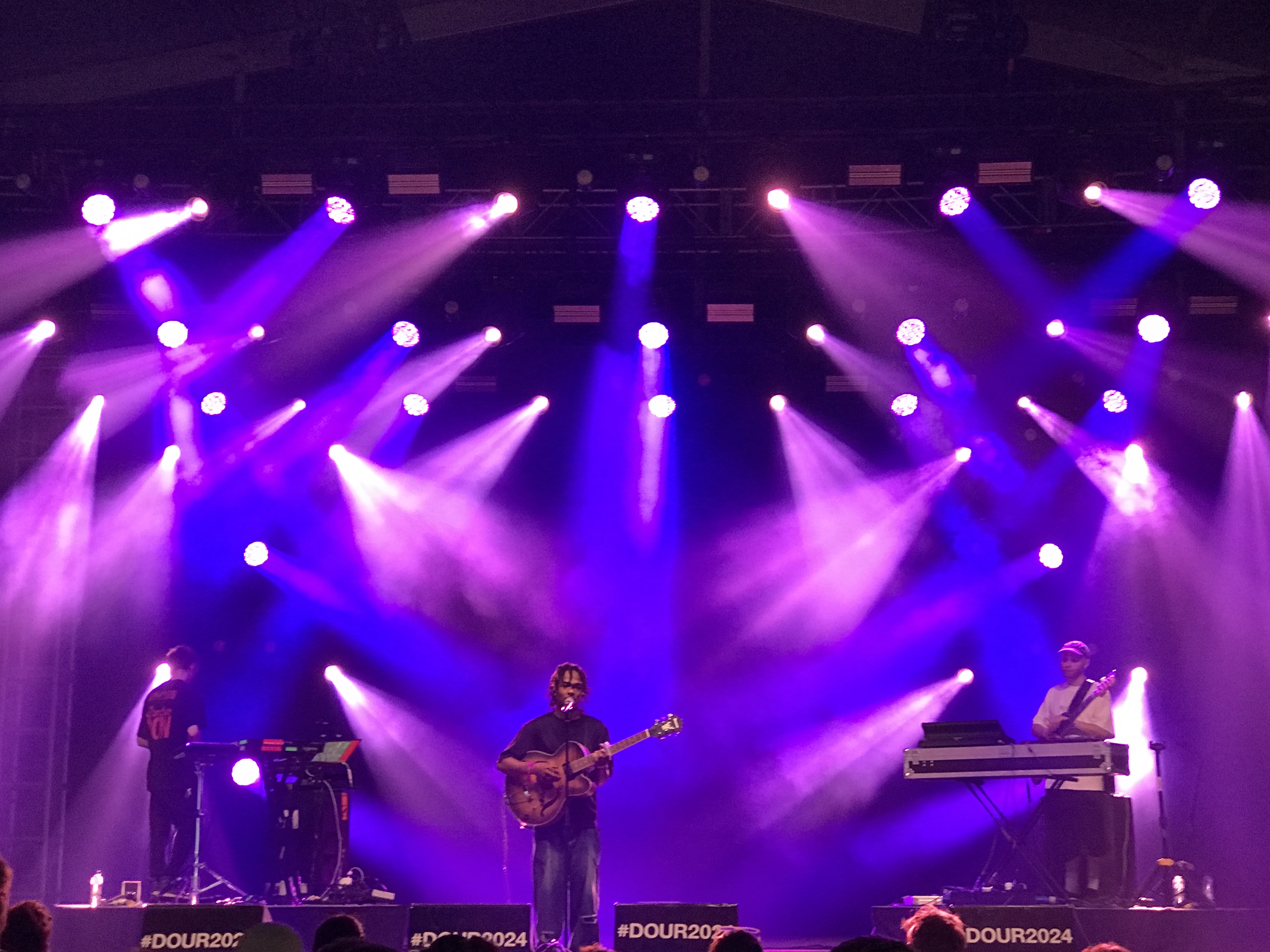
- Berwyn in 2024

Background information
- Born: Berwyn Du Bois; Diego Martin, Port of Spain, Trinidad and Tobago
- Origin: Romford, London, England
- Genres: Hip hop; R&B
- Occupations: rapper; songwriter; record producer
- Website: berwynberwynberwyn.com

Berwyn Du Bois, known mononymously as Berwyn (styled in all caps), is a Trinidadian rapper, producer and songwriter, who is now based in East London.

== Early life ==
Berwyn Du Bois was born in Diego Martin, Port of Spain, Trinidad and Tobago and moved to Romford, East London at the age of nine. His father was a bus driver and his mother a youth worker. According to Berwyn, his father has also worked as a DJ, and his family were "always musical". Berwyn attended the Royal Liberty School, where he was inspired by his music teacher who would take him to a folk club. Berwyn stated that he is still into folk music. Due to his uncertain immigration status, Berwyn was unable to go to university despite earning adequate grades and also struggled to find work. This was a factor in pursuing a career in music. Berwyn previously worked at a Subway franchise in a hospital.

== Career ==
Berwyn's debut mixtape, Demotape/Vega was released on 25 September 2020, though it was written in two weeks in 2018.

In late 2020, Berwyn was placed third in the BBC Sound Of 2021 list.

In late 2021 Demotape/Vega was shortlisted for the Mercury Prize album of the year. Berwyn was eligible due to rule change to the Mercury, allowing anyone who has been resident in the UK or Ireland for more than five years to be nominated. The change was made after a 2020 protest by Japanese-British pop singer Rina Sawayama, whose debut album Sawayama was deemed ineligible because she did not have a British passport.

In November 2021, Berwyn was nominated for 'Best Newcomer' at the MOBO Awards.

His debut studio album, Who Am I, released on 12 July 2024, was also nominated for the Mercury Prize.

== Discography ==
=== Studio albums ===
- Who Am I (12 July 2024)

=== Mixtapes ===
- Demotape/Vega (25 September 2020)
- Tape 2/Fomalhaut (18 June 2021)

=== Singles ===
- "Glory" (7 May 2020)
- "Trap Phone" (16 July 2020)
- "017 Freestyle" (22 September 2020)
- "Vinyl" (25 November 2020)
- "100,000,000" (9 April 2021)
- "I'd Rather Die Than Be Deported" (28 April 2021)
- "Rubber Bands" (11 May 2021)
- "To Be Loved" (18 June 2021)
- "Mia" (10 November 2021)
- "Lose Control" (12 August 2022)
- "Path to Satisfaction" (26 October 2022)
- "3450" / "Chasing Lights (Demo)" (14 December 2022)
- "Bulletproof" (7 March 2023)
- "Neighbours" (26 April 2024)
- "I Am Black" (14 May 2024)
- "Dear Immigration" (11 June 2024)
