= Yaya Bey =

American singer and songwriter

- Born: Hidaiyah Bey; August 4, 1990 (age 35)
- Origin: Queens, New York City, U.S.
- Genres: R&B
- Occupation: Singer
- Years active: 2020–present
- Label: Big Dada

Hidaiyah "Yaya" Bey is an American R&B musician from Queens.

== History ==
Bey released her first album in 2020 titled Madison Tapes. Bey released an EP titled The Things I Can't Take with Me the following year, through Big Dada. Bey released her second full-length album on June 16, 2022. The album received a score rating of 8.6 from Pitchfork upon release.

== Personal life ==
Bey is the daughter of hip-hop artist Grand Daddy I.U.

== Discography ==
=== Studio albums ===
- The Many Alter-Egos of Trill'eta Brown (2016, Elevated)
- This Too... (2019, Elevated)
- Madison Tapes (2020, Elevated)
- Remember Your North Star (2022, Big Dada)
- Ten Fold (2024, Big Dada)
- Do It Afraid (2025, Drink Sum Wtr)
- Fidelity (Yaya Bey album) (2026, Drink Sum Wtr)

=== EPs ===
- The Things I Can't Take with Me (2021, Big Dada)
- Exodus the North Star (2023, Big Dada)
