= Who Am I (Berwyn album) =

Studio album by Berwyn
- Released: 12 July 2024
- Length: 33:52
- Label: Columbia
- Producer: Berwyn

Berwyn chronology
Tape 2/Fomalhaut (2021)	Who Am I (2024)

Singles from Who Am I
- 1. "Neighbors" Released: 26 April 2024; 2. "I Am Black" Released: 14 May 2024; 3. "Dear Immigration" Released: 11 June 2024

Who Am I is the debut studio album by Trinidad-born, London-based musician Berwyn, released on 12 July 2024 through Columbia Records. It received positive reviews from critics, and was nominated for the 2024 Mercury Prize.

== Release ==
On 8 April 2024, Fred Again released the track "BerwynGesaffNeighbours" featuring Gesaffelstein and Berwyn. Berwyn released an alternate version of the track titled "Neighbors" on 26 April 2024. On 14 May 2024, he released the single "I Am Black." On 11 June 2024, Berwyn announced the album's track list and release date, alongside the third single, "Dear Immigration."

== Critical reception ==
Professional ratings
Aggregate scores
Source	Rating
Metacritic	95/100
Review scores
Source	Rating
DIY	5/5 stars
MusicOMH	4/5 stars
The Observer	5/5 stars
The Skinny	4/5 stars

Who Am I was met with critical acclaim upon release, receiving a score of 95 out of 100 on review aggregator Metacritic.

Ed Lawson of DIY described it as a "record that's as skilled in pop immediacy as it is emotional expression; a lyrical gaze that looks as deeply inside as out" and Berwyn "an artist who, on this debut album, can seemingly do just about anything". Ben Devlin of MusicOMH characterised Who Am I as "a relatively brief selection of tracks [that] contains a lot of autobiographical heft, as he works through topics of race, insecurity and excess over surprisingly versatile production". The Observer's Damien Morris wrote that it "cuts a prickly path between the experimental rawness of Mercury-nominated mixtape Demotape/Vega and its excellent sequel Tape 2/Fomalhaut's smoother entreaties" as well as remarking that "the ferocity of Berwyn's talent and the piercing beauty of his crackling, folk-R&B croon mean these heavy topics are never a burden". Reviewing the album for The Skinny, Rhys Morgan called it "declarative" as "the candid expression of his previous work remains, now finessed into a towering major label debut".

== Track listing ==
All tracks written and produced by Berwyn Du Bois unless listed.

Who Am I track listing
No.	Title	Writer(s)	Producer(s)	Length
1.	"Bad Thing"			2:04
2.	"Who Am I"	Berwyn Du Bois; Alex Gibson; Fred Gibson	Berwyn; Fred again..	2:48
3.	"I Am Black"			3:38
4.	"All She Ever Wanted"		Berwyn; Brooklyn Decent	2:06
5.	"Hate"	Du Bois; Artemas Diamandis	Berwyn; Duke.	3:19
6.	"Dear Immigration"			2:38
7.	"Neighbours"	Du Bois; F. Gibson	Fred again..	3:06
8.	"Meet Me by the River"			1:38
9.	"I'm Drowning"			3:35
10.	"Love Is Blind"		Berwyn; Decent	2:50
11.	"Without You"			1:37
12.	"Mama"	Du Bois; Jonny Coffer	Berwyn; Jonny Coffer	4:33
Total length:				33:52
