= Gia Ford =

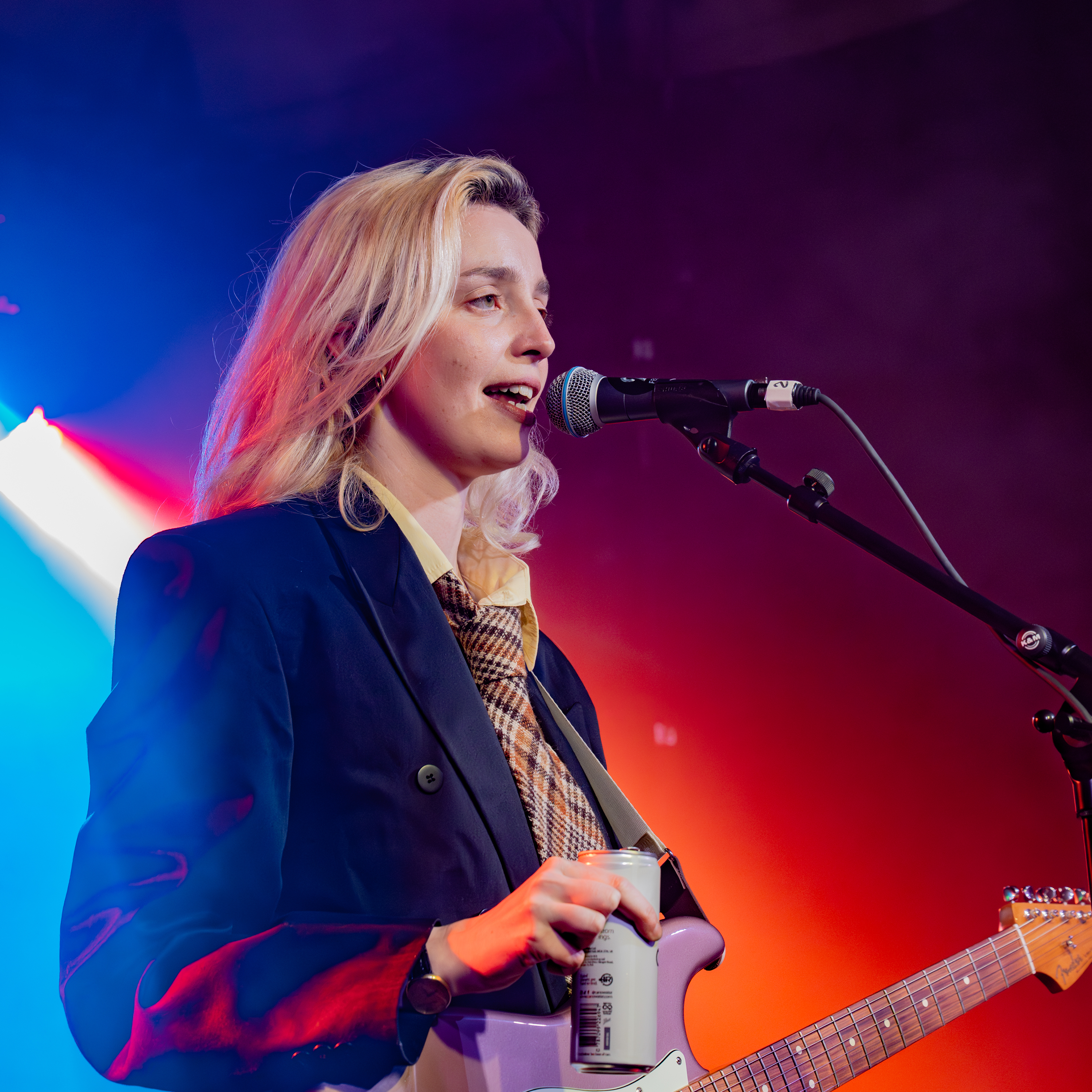
- Performing at SXSW London, June 2025

Background information
- Born: Molly Emma Elizabeth McCormick; 28 November 1996 (age 29); Sheffield, England
- Genres: Alt pop; dark pop; art rock
- Instruments: Vocals; guitar
- Years active: 2019–present
- Labels: Dirty Hit; Chrysalis Records
- Website: giaford.co.uk

Molly Emma Elizabeth McCormick (born 28 November 1996), known professionally as Gia Ford, is an English singer-songwriter and guitarist. She began her career under Dirty Hit with the mixtapes/EPs Poster Boy (2019) and Murder in the Dark (2020). After signing to Chrysalis Records, she released her debut album Transparent Things (2024).

== Early life ==
Molly Emma Elizabeth McCormick was born in Sheffield. Her parents' divorced when she was a baby, thus she grew up between there and Wilmslow, Cheshire.

== Career ==
Ford signed with Dirty Hit in 2019, through which she released her debut seven-track mixtape Poster Boy that October, produced by Fred Macpherson of Spector, preceded by the singles "Turbo Dreams" and "God, Cameras, Everyone". This was followed by the nine-track Murder in the Dark in spring 2020, which she reunited with Macpherson to produce. The singles "Sleeping In Your Garden" and "This Town" were released in August and November respectively. She wrote the latter with Låpsley and Steph Marziano; it was a BBC Music Introducing selection in December.

Ford made her festival debut at the 2022 Tramlines Festival. Ford exited her contract with Dirty Hit, later alleging mistreatment of her girlfriend, and signed with Chrysalis Records in 2023, sharing the singles "Alligator" and "Falling in Love Again" under the new label. She supported Marika Hackman on the UK and EU legs of her tour in spring 2024 and performed at Latitude Festival and the Green Man Festival. She also booked The Great Escape Festival and joined other artists in calling on the festival to drop Barclays as a sponsor.

Ford released her debut studio album Transparent Things in September 2024, which was accompanies by the singles "Poolside", "Loveshot", "Paint Me Like a Woman" and "Try Changing" throughout the year. A further standalone single "Earth Return" followed in November, as well as headline tour dates and a Live at Leeds gig.

In 2025, Elton John named Ford an up-and-coming artist. In June 2026, Ford released "At Least For Now" as a single for her album A Room Within A Room. The album is scheduled to release on September 18, 2026.

== Artistry ==
The "atmospheric" nature of the music Ford's mother's would play left an impression on her, including Massive Attack, Portishead, Björk and Kate Bush. Ford also recalls listening to Tallest Man on Earth, Ben Howard, The Rolling Stones and Dusty Springfield in her youth. Her 2019 mixtape Poster Boy drew upon Lewis Taylor. In a 2020 interview with The Face, Ford named David Bowie and Grace Jones as influences. Later in the year, she mentioned "pulling from" Fleetwood Mac, Lana Del Rey and Robbie Williams. She also praised contemporaries 404 Guild and Albert Gold.

Regarding her debut album Transparent Things (2024), she named PJ Harvey, Nick Cave and Jefferson Airplane as influences. Other artists Ford has mentioned include Jeff Lynne of Electric Light Orchestra, calling him a "genius", as well as Pink Floyd and Roxy Music. Ford has described being shaped by queer subcultures and drag in particular. Lyrically, Ford combines personal, third-party, fictional and imaginative storytelling, including taking inspiration from old photographs, films and literature. She also cited an admiration for "poetic" musicianship and Jacob Alon in particular. Her debut album tells stories of characters including "outcasts" and "ghosts".

Ford's earlier releases consisted of "'80s-influenced synth pop", funk and lo-fi. She then veered towards dark pop on her next releases. In January 2025, she expressed a desire to have a less electronic sound going forward and incorporate more live performance elements.

== Personal life ==
Ford is a lesbian. She has been in a relationship with photographer Melanie Lehmann (also known as Melony Lemon) since 2018.

== Discography ==
=== Albums ===
- Transparent Things (2024)
- A Room Within a Room (2026)

=== EPs, LPs and mixtapes ===
- Poster Boy (2019)
- Murder in the Dark (2020)
- Waiting for the Wind to Change (2024) (vinyl exclusive)

=== Singles ===
- "Turbo Dreams" (2019)
- "God, Cameras, Everyone" (2019)
- "Sleeping in Your Garden" (2020)
- "This Town" (2020)
- "A Car Crash for Two" (2022)
- "Alligator" (2023)
- "Falling in Love Again" (2023)
- "Poolside" (2024)
- "Loveshot" (2024)
- "Paint Me Like a Woman" (2024)
- "Try Changing" (2024)
- "Earth Return" (2024)
- "God" (2025)
- "How Do I Reply?" (2026)
- "I Guess My Time Has Come" (2026)
- "At Least for Now" (2026)
- "Shell" (2026)

=== Collaborations ===
- "Cocktail Nights" (2021), with Chili Palmer
