= Jay Daniel =

American musical artist

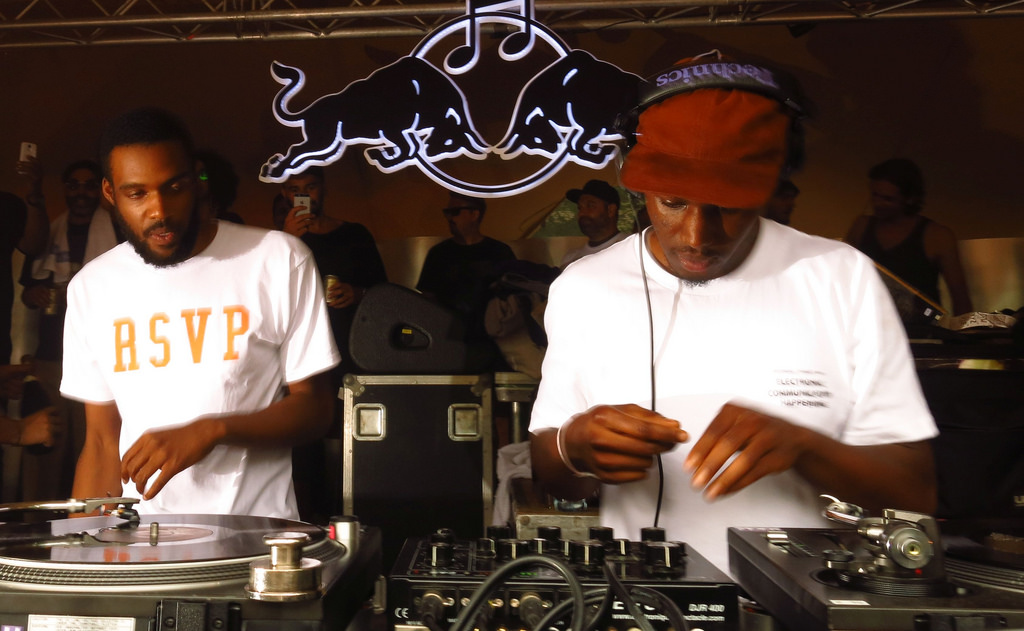

Background information
- Origin: Detroit, Michigan, United States
- Genres: Hip hop, R&B, Detroit techno, house, techno, world music, progressive jazz
- Occupation(s): Producer, Musician, DJ
- Instrument(s): MPC, drum kit, african drums, synthesizer
- Years active: 2013–present
- Labels: Ninja Tune, Watusi High, Wild Oats, Sound Signature
- Website: https://www.jaydanielwatusi.com/

Jay Daniel is an electronic musician, producer, and selector from Detroit, Michigan, United States. In addition to his own label, Watusi High, Daniel has released music on Sound Signature, Wild Oats, and most recently released his debut album, 'Broken Knowz' on Ninja Tune. Son to Naomi Daniel

== Career ==
In September 2013, Daniel released his first EP, "Scorpio Rising", on Detroit musician Theo Parrish's label, Sound Signature. Months later, in February 2014 Daniel released another EP, Karmatic Equations (WOJD01), on fellow Detroit native Kyle Hall's label, Wild Oats. In May 2015, Daniel launched his own label, 'Watusi High', with the release of his two-track "School Dance" EP. Three years later, Daniel released a debut LP on Ninja Tune; since its release, 'Broken Knowz' received positive critical response.

As a DJ and selector, Daniel has curated musical sets for radio and venue audiences, featuring at DEMF, Boiler Room and Red Bull Music Academy, and guest-featuring on BBC Radio 1. He regularly tours, curating events in the UK, Japan, Australia, and the US. Daniel has frequently collaborated with fellow Detroiter, Kyle Hall, and London's Funkineven (Steven Julien), featured on Julien's "Abyss/Discipline" (Apron13).
