= I Know I'm Funny Haha =

Studio album by Faye Webster
- Released: June 25, 2021
- Genres: Indie country; R&B; soft rock; indie pop; Americana; country; lounge
- Length: 40:43
- Label: Secretly Canadian
- Producers: Drew Vandenberg; Faye Webster

Faye Webster chronology
Atlanta Millionaires Club (2019)	I Know I'm Funny Haha (2021)	Underdressed at the Symphony (2024)

Singles from I Know I'm Funny Haha
- 1. "Both All the Time" Released: August 10, 2019; 2. "In a Good Way" Released: April 15, 2020; 3. "Better Distractions" Released: September 16, 2020; 4. "Cheers" Released: April 27, 2021; 5. "I Know I'm Funny haha" Released: May 18, 2021; 6. "A Dream with a Baseball Player" Released: June 23, 2021

I Know I'm Funny Haha (stylized as I Know I'm Funny haha) is the fourth studio album by American singer Faye Webster, released on June 25, 2021 through Secretly Canadian.

== Critical reception ==
Professional ratings
Aggregate scores
Source	Rating
Metacritic	82/100
Review scores
Source	Rating
AllMusic	3/5 stars
DIY	4/5 stars
Loud and Quiet	5/10
NME	4/5 stars
Pitchfork	8.4/10
Tom Hull – on the Web	B+
Uncut	4.5/5 stars
Under the Radar	7.5/10

I Know I'm Funny Haha received a weighted average score of 82 out of 100 from eight reviews on Metacritic, indicating "universal acclaim". Jeremy D. Larson for Pitchfork called it "dazzling" and applauded it for showing "its great depth at its own unconcerned pace".

I Know I'm Funny Haha was listed as the 45th best album of the first half of 2021 by Stereogum.

Lead track "Better Distractions" was listed by President Barack Obama as one of his favorite songs of 2020.

=== Accolades ===
I Know I'm Funny Haha on year-end lists
Publication	List	Rank	Ref.
Paste	The 50 Best Albums of 2021	39	
Pitchfork	The 50 Best Albums of 2021	11	

== Track listing ==
All tracks are written by Faye Webster.

I Know I'm Funny Haha track listing
No.	Title	Length
1.	"Better Distractions"	4:09
2.	"Sometimes"	4:33
3.	"I Know I'm Funny Haha"	2:43
4.	"In a Good Way"	3:44
5.	"Kind Of"	5:25
6.	"Cheers"	3:15
7.	"Both All the Time"	3:12
8.	"A Stranger"	2:59
9.	"A Dream with a Baseball Player"	3:41
10.	"Overslept" (featuring Mei Ehara)	3:29
11.	"Half of Me"	3:33
Total length:		40:43

=== A Dream with a Baseball Player ===
The album's ninth track, "A Dream with a Baseball Player", was released as a single. "A Dream with a Baseball Player" was inspired by Atlanta Braves outfielder Ronald Acuña Jr., on whom Webster (a lifelong Braves fan) had developed a crush, while watching Braves games regularly after her return from her 2019 tour. Lyrics such as "[H]e and I don't speak the same language / But we have conversations in my head... I could just meet him and get it over/ Or I'll just keep wearing his name on my shirt", with the repeated refrain of "How did I fall in love with someone I don't know?" are explained by Webster with "A song about Ronald Acuña Jr., obviously... I guess this song explains what having a crush feels like. Having made up conversations with them in your head even though you don’t speak their language, wearing their team jersey every day, things that make you feel closer to this person that you don’t know at all."

== Personnel ==
=== Musicians ===
- Faye Webster – vocals, guitar
- Anna Bishop – violin (track 8)
- Harold Brown – drums
- Mei Ehara – featured vocals (track 10)
- Tressa Gold – violin (track 8)
- Bryan Howard – bass
- Jeanette Jang – violin (track 8)
- Noah Johnson – cello (track 2)
- Jordi Lara – cello (track 4)
- Annie Leeth – violin (tracks 4, 8)
- Stacy Matthews – violin (track 8)
- Elizabeth O'Hara – viola (track 8)
- Adrian Pintea – violin (track 8)
- Trey Pollard – conductor (track 8)
- Meredith Riley – violin (track 8)
- Nick Rosen – keyboards
- Schuyler Slack – cello (track 8)
- Derek Smith – viola (track 8)
- Jocelyn Smith – viola (track 8)
- Matt Stoessel – guitar
- Jeremy Wheatley – drums
- Henry White – horn

=== Technical ===
- Alex Dejong – recording engineer (track 8
- Joe Lambert – mastering
- Drew Vandenberg – production, mixing, recording engineer
- Faye Webster – production

== Charts ==
Chart performance for I Know I'm Funny Haha
Chart (2021)	Peak position
Scottish Albums (Official Charts)	78
UK Independent Albums (Official Charts)	22
US Americana/Folk Albums (Billboard)	10
US Heatseekers Albums (Billboard)	9
US Top Album Sales (Billboard)	34
US Indie Store Album Sales (Billboard)	7
