= Malia (American musician) =

Singer-songwriter

- Also known as: MALIA
- Born: Malia Kristin Cunningham; September 8, 1986 (age 40); Plano, TX
- Origin: Los Angeles, CA
- Genres: Alternative R&B, neo soul
- Occupation: Singer-songwriter
- Instruments: Vocals, guitar, piano
- Years active: 2015–present
- Website: www.maliavibes.com

Malia Kristin Cunningham is an American singer-songwriter raised in the suburbs of Seattle, WA and based in Los Angeles, CA.

== Biography ==
Malia began studying music as a child, taking piano lessons at age eight and joining choir in middle school. However, shyness drove her to pursue a traditional career path and she moved to California for college, graduating with a degree in political science and sociology with the intention to go to law school. After graduation, she decided to pursue music seriously and began practicing guitar every day. She released her first single in 2015.

Matt Martians of The Internet invited Malia to their studio where she met the band. She went on to collaborate with Syd on her track "Dirty Laundry" and opening for Syd on her 2017 West Coast tour. Malia collaborated with Soulection on the release of her single "Play Sides" and played their Los Angeles tour stop.

Malia released her first album Unpolished in April 2021. Later that year, she was asked by Alicia Keys to cover a song for the 20th anniversary of Songs In A Minor.

In 2022, she announced a new EP What's After 'I Love You?' coming March 4, 2022 with a first single "Only One." The EP is a conceptual work about heartbreak.

== Discography ==
- Malia EP (2015)
- Letting Go EP (2016)
- Late Bloomer EP (2017)
- Ripe EP (2019)
- Unpolished (2021)
- What's After 'I Love You?' EP (2022)
- Back In My Body (2024)
