= Underdressed at the Symphony =

Studio album by Faye Webster
- Released: March 1, 2024
- Studio: Sonic Ranch, Texas
- Genre: Indie rock; R&B; country
- Length: 36:45
- Label: Secretly Canadian
- Producer: Drew Vandenberg; Faye Webster

Faye Webster chronology
I Know I'm Funny Haha (2021)	Underdressed at the Symphony (2024)

Singles from Underdressed at the Symphony
- 1. "But Not Kiss" Released: June 20, 2023; 2. "Lifetime" Released: September 20, 2023; 3. "Lego Ring" Released: January 11, 2024; 4. "Feeling Good Today" Released: February 8, 2024

Underdressed at the Symphony is the fifth studio album by American singer Faye Webster. It was released on March 1, 2024, through Secretly Canadian.

== Background and singles ==
Webster recorded Underdressed at the Symphony at Sonic Ranch in Texas with her long-time band. She evolves a "familiar intimacy" within her songwriting skills on the album, blending "catharsis and humor" over a sonic palette of multiple genres like "indie rock, country, and R&B". It sees the singer pushing herself "further than ever before" on a lyrical front, "truly leaving her emotions" on the tracks. The album's title draws on Webster's experiences getting tickets to see the Atlanta Symphony Orchestra in Atlanta, Georgia, at the last minute and not having time to adequately dress up for it.

On June 20, 2023, Webster released the lead single "But Not Kiss", a "bold and forceful" track compared to the likes of the Arctic Monkeys. On September 20, the second single "Lifetime", a "reflective five-minute track", was released alongside a music video directed by Kyle Ng of Braindead Studios. The album announcement on January 11, 2024, coincided with the release of the third single "Lego Ring" with Lil Yachty, whom she shares a lifelong friendship with. On February 15, Webster released the single "Feeling Good Today". At just 86 seconds, the track mainly consists of a guitar and the singer's "Vocoder-altered voice", accentuated with "light piano" touches.

== Critical reception ==
Professional ratings
Aggregate scores
Source	Rating
AnyDecentMusic?	7.6/10
Metacritic	82/100
Review scores
Source	Rating
AllMusic	4/5 stars
Beats Per Minute	72%
DIY	3.5/4 stars
The Line of Best Fit	8/10
Exclaim!	8/10
Paste	7.9/10
Pitchfork	7.5/10
Slant Magazine	4/5 stars
Spin	A−
Under the Radar	7.5/10 stars

According to the review aggregator Metacritic, Underdressed at the Symphony received "universal acclaim" based on a weighted average score of 82 out of 100 from 15 critic scores. Aggregator AnyDecentMusic? gave it 7.6 out of 10, based on their assessment of the critical consensus.

Writing for Beats Per Minute, Brianna Corrine concludes: "Her ability to speak about truly complex and philosophical facets of love and the self in a lyrically simplified way, but with sonically expansive and cohesive instrumentation, is admirable and incredibly progressive in the world of genres and storytelling." In her review for Pitchfork, Arielle Gordon writes that the album "emphasizes the naturalism of her songwriting, building melodies with a grand piano, a drum kit, and an electric guitar." Stephen Deusner of Uncut describes Webster on the album as a "minimalist songwriter who uses as few words as possible to conjure emotions too messy or too contradictory or simply too painful to state outright." Writing for The Observer, Kitty Empire describes the album as "delicate and eclectic" and "70s-tinged alt-country." Michelle Dalarossa of Under the Radar writes: "Existing fans will be happy to hear the same shimmering pedal-steel and alt-country instrumentation that have come to define the 26-year-old's catalog, but the album paints a clear picture of Webster's growth as an artist." In her review for Paste, Sam Small praised the album's lyrics, writing: "Webster's lyrics are like the underlined sentences of a novel—the lines glow from the page, compelling you to frantically dig into your purse to find a pen." Adele Julia of The Line of Best Fit writes: "Amidst the unexpected twists in its production, Webster still retains a strong narrative voice throughout, her intentions unfolding with each new line." Writing for Exclaim!, Megan LaPierre states that the album "builds upon the frameworks she's established and pushes them to their limits." Chris Taylor of DIY was critical of the album's lyrics, writing: "While it does see Faye and her band at their most musically warm and open - nearly every track is a devastating beauty - lyrically she feels more closed off than ever before." Joshua Minsoo Kim of Rolling Stone describes the album as a "marvel of patient, obsessive contemplation." John Murphy of MusicOMH describes the album as "deliberate, considered yet oddly beguiling mix of jazz, folk and indie, with some hip-hop stylings thrown in." AllMusic's Stephen Thomas Erlewine writes that "Webster emphasizes presentation and execution over composition or construction, letting her backing band and tight group of collaborators breathe along with her sighing melodies." Evan Haga of Spin writes that the album's lyrics "push breakup-record pain against proclamations of a woman's wants and needs, while mixing in funny, specific details of contemporary life." Writing her review for Slant Magazine, Dana Poland states that "The real magic of the album [...] can be found in its instrumentation."

== Track listing ==
All tracks are written by Faye Webster (additional writing credits are noted).

Underdressed at the Symphony track listing
No.	Title	Writer(s)	Length
1.	"Thinking About You"		6:36
2.	"But Not Kiss"		3:42
3.	"Wanna Quit All the Time"		4:35
4.	"Lego Ring" (with Lil Yachty)	Webster; Miles Parks McCollum	2:43
5.	"Feeling Good Today"		1:26
6.	"Lifetime"		5:06
7.	"He Loves Me Yeah!"	Webster; Chase Lawrence	2:50
8.	"eBay Purchase History"		3:44
9.	"Underdressed at the Symphony"		3:33
10.	"Tttttime"		2:30
Total length:			36:45

== Personnel ==
- Faye Webster – vocals, production
- Drew Vandenberg – production, mixing (all tracks); engineering
- Sarah Register – mastering
- Annie Leeth – engineering, arrangement
- Mario Ramirez – engineering
- Luke Webster – artwork
- Charles Garner - drums
- Lil Yachty – vocals on "Lego Ring"
- Nels Cline - electric guitar
- Nick Rosen - piano
- Matt "Pistol" Stoessel - guitar, steel guitar

== Charts ==
Chart performance for Underdressed at the Symphony
Chart (2024)	Peak position
Australian Vinyl Albums (ARIA)	16
New Zealand Albums (RMNZ)	37
Scottish Albums (OCC)	37
UK Independent Albums (OCC)	16
