= Nigel Hall (musician) =

American vocalist and keyboardist

- Born: September 15, 1981 (age 43); Washington, D.C., United States
- Genres: Rhythm and blues, soul, funk, jam
- Occupation(s): Musician, producer, songwriter
- Instrument(s): Keyboard, vocals
- Years active: 2007–present
- Website: Official website

Nigel David Hall (born September 15, 1981) is an American vocalist and keyboardist. He is a member of Lettuce and also fronts his solo project, The Nigel Hall Band. He was born and raised in Washington, D.C., and lives in New Orleans, Louisiana.

== Nigel Hall Band ==
The Nigel Hall Band's debut record, Ladies & Gentlemen... Nigel Hall, was released on Feel Music / Round Hill Records in November 2015.

== Discography ==
Ladies & Gentlemen... Nigel Hall (released November 13, 2015, on Feel Music)
