= Faye Webster =

American musician (born 1997)

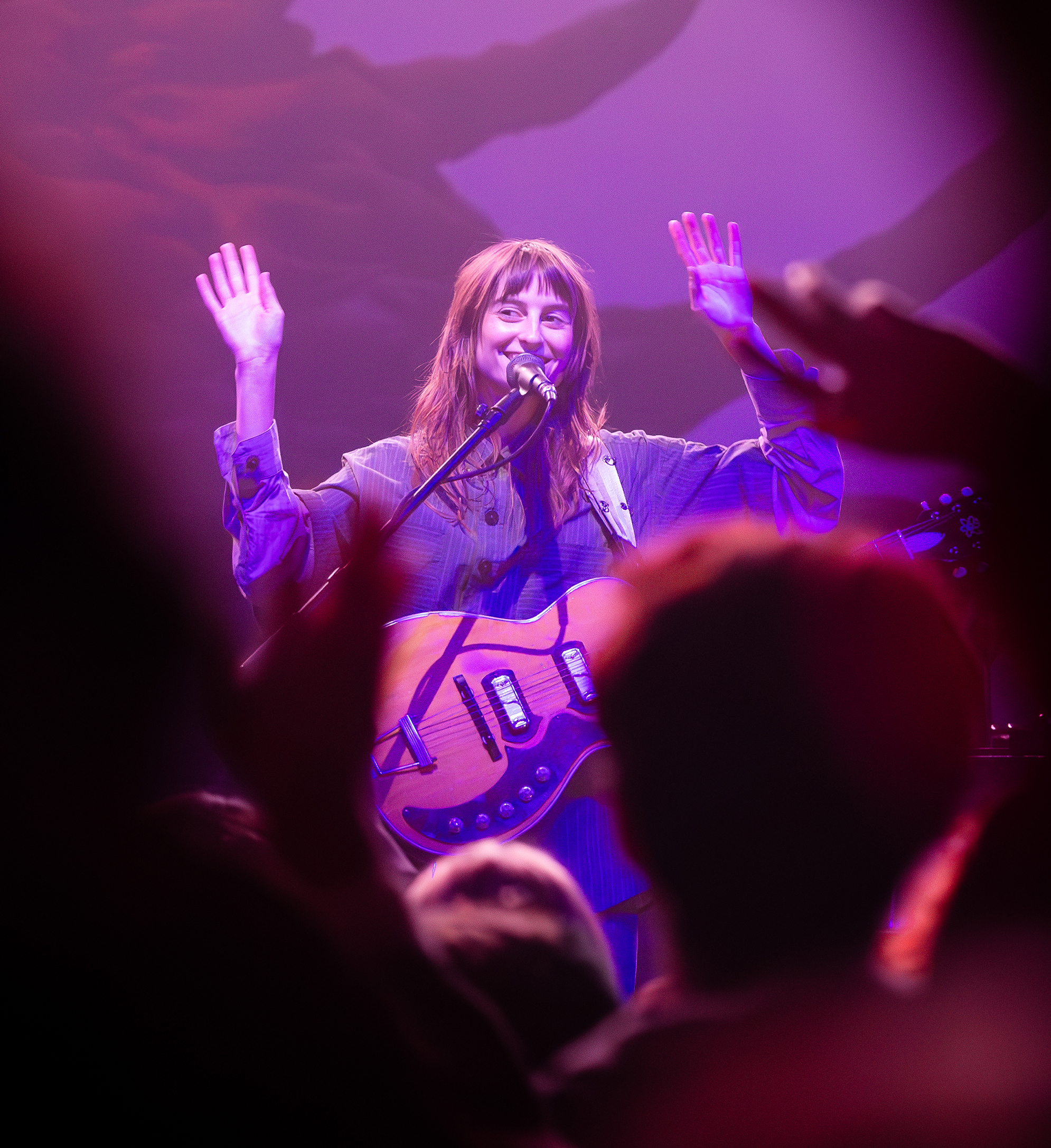
- Webster performing at the Riviera in Chicago (2023)

Background information
- Born: June 25, 1997 (age 29); Atlanta, Georgia, US
- Genres: Indie pop; alt-country; R&B; soft rock
- Occupation: Singer-songwriter
- Instruments: Vocals; guitar
- Years active: 2013–present
- Labels: Awful; Secretly Canadian; Columbia
- Website: fayewebster.com

Faye Connell Webster (born June 25, 1997) is an American singer-songwriter from Atlanta, Georgia. She has released five studio albums: Run and Tell (2013), Faye Webster (2017), Atlanta Millionaires Club (2019), I Know I'm Funny Haha (2021), and Underdressed at the Symphony (2024).

== Early life ==
Faye Connell Webster was born June 25, 1997 in Atlanta, Georgia. Several of her family members are also musicians, and by age 14, Webster was writing music. She attended Henry W. Grady High School in Atlanta. After watching her perform at open mic nights, her dad advised her to record her music so that people could take it home with them.

== Career ==
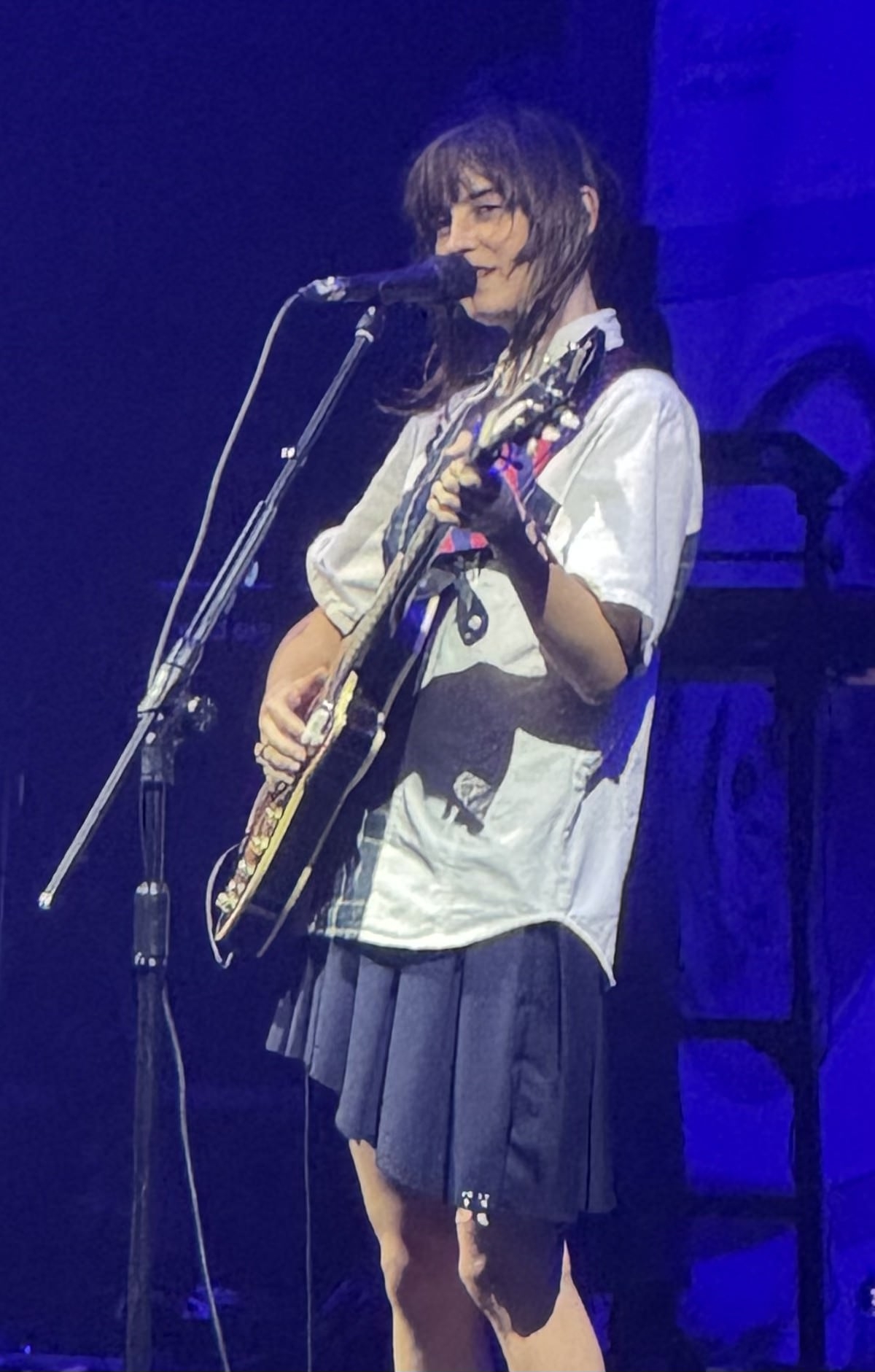
Webster performing in Manila in 2025

At the age of 16, on October 30, 2013, Webster self-released her debut album, Run and Tell.

After graduating high school, she enrolled in Belmont University in Nashville to study songwriting, but soon dropped out and moved back to Atlanta after deciding that she was "wasting time and money". She made a deal with her parents that she would live at home for a year and if she was not successful as a musician, she would return to college. Soon after dropping out, in 2017, Webster signed to Awful Records.

In April 2017, she embarked on a 12-city tour with Sean Rowe followed by the release of her second album, Faye Webster in May 2017.

Webster signed to the Secretly Canadian record label in late 2018, and released her third full-length album, Atlanta Millionaires Club, in May 2019 via the label. The album is named after her father's group of grad-school friends who compete in everything from doughnut-eating contests to 5k races. In March 2019, the album's lead single "Room Temperature" was featured in a Rolling Stone article.

She released the song "Both All The Time" on August 7, 2019, prior to embarking on a US tour. In April 2020, Webster released the single "In a Good Way", followed by "Better Distractions" in September of the same year. "Better Distractions" was chosen by former president Barack Obama in December 2020 as one of his favorite songs of the year.

In April 2021, she released the single "Cheers" and announced her fourth studio album I Know I'm Funny Haha, which was released on June 25, 2021. "Both All The Time", "In A Good Way", and "Better Distractions" would serve as the preceding singles to "Cheers".

Webster released an EP titled Live at Electric Lady in October 2021, as part of a Spotify exclusive series of the same name. Recorded at Electric Lady Studios in New York City, the EP features live recordings of songs from her previous two studio albums, as well as a cover version of the song "If You Need to, Keep Time on Me" by Fleet Foxes.

In 2022, she released another EP titled Car Therapy Sessions, performing more songs from her previous two albums, as well as a new song "Car Therapy", with orchestral backing arranged by Trey Pollard. She supported the band Haim as one of the openers on their One More Haim Tour shortly after releasing the EP.

In June 2023, Webster released the single "But Not Kiss" and declared tour dates for her upcoming tour.

In September 2023, she released the single "Lifetime" and announced her UK/European tour dates for her tour in 2024.

In March 2024, Webster released her fifth studio album, Underdressed at the Symphony. It was supported by an international tour, as well as her debut appearances at the Coachella, Governor's Ball, Primavera Sound, and Bonnaroo music festivals.

In November 2024, she released the single "Make 'em Laugh" alongside indie-pop artist Benét.

In 2025, she signed to Columbia Records.

== Personal life ==
Webster is passionate about the Atlanta Braves, would leave school early to attend baseball games, and wears team jerseys regularly. She had a crush on Ronald Acuña Jr., a Braves player the same age as her, which inspired her to write at least one song, "A Dream with a Baseball Player". She got to sing "Take Me Out to the Ballgame" at a Braves game. Her other hobbies include Pokémon and yo-yo; she has attended the World Yo-Yo Contest. Webster has designed and sold her own custom yo-yo. Her photography of local rappers, including classmate Lil Yachty and Shelley FKA DRAM, has been published in media outlets including Billboard, Rolling Stone, and Spotify. Based on her photography, she was hired to shoot an ad campaign for Nike in 2017. The company was rebooting its Air Max 97 shoe and wanted to work with creatives who were born in the year 1997.

Webster formerly dated Boothlord, a member of Danger Incorporated, a rap duo based in Atlanta. They met when they were both signed to Awful Records. The couple broke up in 2024.

Webster performed in January 2024 at the Artists for Aid Benefit Concert in Newark which raised funds for the Gaza Strip and Sudan. In September 2025, Webster joined the No Music For Genocide boycott to geo-block her music from all music streaming platforms in Israel in protest of the Gaza genocide.

== Discography ==
Faye Webster discography
- Studio albums: 5
- EPs: 2
- Singles: 14

=== Studio albums ===
List of studio albums, with selected information
Title	Details	Peak chart positions			
Title	Details	US Folk	US Heat	US Sales	NZ
Run and Tell	Released: October 30, 2013; Label: Self-released; Formats: CD, music download, streaming media	—	—	—	—
Faye Webster	Released: May 12, 2017; Label: Awful, Secretly Canadian; Formats: LP, CD, music download, streaming media	—	—	—	—
Atlanta Millionaires Club	Released: May 24, 2019; Label: Secretly Canadian; Formats: LP, CD, music download, streaming media	—	25	—	—
I Know I'm Funny Haha	Released: June 25, 2021; Label: Secretly Canadian; Formats: LP, CD, music download, streaming media	10	9	35	—
Underdressed at the Symphony	Released: March 1, 2024; Label: Secretly Canadian; Formats: LP, Cassette, CD, music download, streaming media	11	1	20	37

=== EPs ===
List of extended plays, with selected information
Title	Details	Peak chart positions
Title	Details	US Sales
Live at Electric Lady	Released: October 14, 2021; Label: Secretly Canadian; Formats: Streaming (Spotify exclusive)	—
Car Therapy Sessions	Released: April 29, 2022; Label: Secretly Canadian; Formats: Vinyl, digital download, streaming	100

=== Singles ===
==== As lead artist ====
List of singles as lead artist, with selected peak chart positions
Title	Year	Peak chart positions	Certifications	Album
Title	Year	US Rock	Certifications	Album
"Wrong People"	2013	—		Faye Webster
"She Won't Go Away"	2017	—		Faye Webster
"Both All the Time"	2019	—		I Know I'm Funny Haha
"In a Good Way"	2020	—		I Know I'm Funny Haha
"Better Distractions"	2020	—		I Know I'm Funny Haha
"Cheers"	2021	—		I Know I'm Funny Haha
"I Know I'm Funny Haha"	2021	—	RIAA: Platinum	I Know I'm Funny Haha
"A Dream with a Baseball Player"	2021	—		I Know I'm Funny Haha
"Car Therapy"	2022	—		Car Therapy Sessions
"Suite: Jonny"	2022	—		Car Therapy Sessions
"But Not Kiss"	2023	—		Underdressed at the Symphony
"Lifetime"	2023	—		Underdressed at the Symphony
"Lego Ring" (with Lil Yachty)	2024	47		Underdressed at the Symphony
"Feeling Good Today"	2024	—		Underdressed at the Symphony

==== As featured artist ====
Title	Year	Album
"Rollin' " (Ethereal featuring Faye Webster)	2017	Mankind
"Friendster" (Wieuca featuring Faye Webster)	2017	Local Celebrity
"No Way" (Ethereal and Lord Narf featuring Faye Webster)	2018	Non-album single
"Strange" (Ethereal featuring Faye Webster)	2020	E2
"Go On" (Harolddd featuring Faye Webster)	2020	Non-album single
"IfUwanted" (Ethereal featuring Faye Webster)	2020	HeatDeath4Prelude
"Sagittarius Superstar" (COIN featuring Faye Webster)	2021	Green Blue + Indigo Violet
"Make 'em Laugh" (Benét featuring Faye Webster)	2024	Non-album single

=== Other charted and certified songs ===
List of other charted songs, with selected chart positions
Title	Year	Peak chart positions				Certifications	Album
Title	Year	US Bub.	US Rock	UK Indie Break.	NZ Hot	Certifications	Album
"Kingston"	2019	—	—	—	—	RIAA: Platinum; RMNZ: Platinum	Atlanta Millionaires Club
"Right Side of My Neck"	2019	—	—	—	—	RIAA: Gold	Atlanta Millionaires Club
"I Know You"	2023	18	9	19	—	BPI: Silver; RMNZ: Gold	Faye Webster
"Underdressed at the Symphony"	2024	—	—	—	34		Underdressed at the Symphony
