= 2020 in rhythm and blues =

This article summarizes the events, album releases, and album release dates in rhythm and blues for the year 2020.

== Events ==
=== January ===
- On January 1, Lexii Alijai died at the age of 21.
- On January 2, Lorraine Chandler died at the age of 73.
- On January 5, the 34th Golden Disc Awards were held. BTS won Album of the Year for Map of the Soul: Persona, the TikTok Golden Disc Popularity Award, and the NetEase Fans Choice K-Pop Star Award. Zico won Best R&B Hip Hop Award.
- On January 11, Maceo Woods died at the age of 87.
- On January 13, Demetri Callas died at the age of 77.
- On January 19, Jimmy Heath died at the age of 93. Robert Parker died at the age of 89.
- On January 21, Meritxell Negre died at the age of 48.
- On January 26, the 62nd Annual Grammy Awards were held. Anderson .Paak and André 3000 won Best R&B Performance for "Come Home". Anderson .Paak won Best R&B Album for Ventura. Lizzo won Best Traditional R&B Performance for "Jerome" and Best Urban Contemporary Album for Cuz I Love You (Deluxe). PJ Morton and JoJo won Best R&B Song for "Say So". Jacob Collier won Best Arrangement, Instrumental or A Cappella for "Moon River" and Best Arrangement, Instruments and Vocals for "All Night Long". Steve Greenberg won Best Album Notes for Stax '68: A Memphis Story. Beyoncé won Best Music Film for Homecoming.

=== February ===
- On February 7, Ronny Drayton died at the age of 66.
- On February 18, the Brit Awards 2020 were held. Mabel won British Female Solo Artist. Celeste won the Rising Star Award.
- On February 21, The Headies 2020 were held. Fireboy DML won Best R&B Single for "Tattoo", Album of the Year for Apollo, and Best R&B Album for Laughter, Tears and Goosebumps. Praiz won Best Vocal Performance (Male) for "Under the Sky". Wizkid won Artiste of the Year and Viewer's Choice. Pheelz won Producer of the Year. Davido won Best Music Video for "1 Milli". Omah Lay won Next Rated.
- On February 22, Bob Boykin died at the age of 67.
- On February 24, Peter Schimke died at the age of 59.
- On February 27, Lillian Offitt died at the age of 81.

=== March ===
- On March 4, Barbara Martin died at the age of 76.
- On March 14, Phil Phillips died at the age of 94.
- On March 24, Manu Dibango died at the age of 86.
- On March 30, Bill Withers died at the age of 81.

=== April ===
- On April 1, Ronn Matlock died at the age of 72.
- On April 5, Ben Elliott died at the age of 67.
- On April 6, Onaje Allan Gumbs died at the age of 70.
- On April 8, Glenn Fredly died at the age of 44.
- On April 10, Jymie Merritt died at the age of 93.
- On April 15, Eddie Cooley died at the age of 87.
- On April 17, Barney Ales died at the age of 85.
- On April 24, Hamilton Bohannon died at the age of 78.
- On April 27, Young Jessie died at the age of 83.
- On April 28, Bobby Lewis died at the age of 95.
- On April 29, Stezo died at the age of 52.
- On April 30, Tony Allen died at the age of 79.
- Ceybil Jefferies died.

=== May ===
- On May 5, Sweet Pea Atkinson died at the age of 74.
- On May 7, Andre Harrell died at the age of 59.
- On May 9, Little Richard died at the age of 87.
- On May 10, Betty Wright died at the age of 66.
- On May 15, Phil May died at the age of 75. Lance Martin died.
- On May 17, Lucky Peterson died at the age of 55.
- On May 19, Robert Ford Jr. died at the age of 70.

=== June ===
- On June 8, Bonnie Pointer died at the age of 69.
- On June 15, Maiesha Rashad died.
- On June 21, Walkin' Cane Mark died at the age of 52.
- On June 23, Reid Whitelaw died at the age of 74.
- On June 26, Tami Lynn died at the age of 81. Sandra Feva died at the age of 73.
- On June 28, the BET Awards 2020 were held. DJ Khaled, Nipsey Hussle and John Legend won Video of the Year for "Higher". Chris Brown and Drake won Best Collaboration for "No Guidance". Chris Brown won Best Male R&B/Pop Artist. Lizzo won Best Female R&B/Pop Artist. Teyana Taylor won Video Director of the Year. Beyoncé, Blue Ivy, WizKid and Saint Jhn won the BET Her Award for "Brown Skin Girl".
- On June 29, the Juno Awards of 2020 were held. Lennon Stella won Breakthrough Artist of the Year. Alessia Cara won Album of the Year for The Pains of Growing and Songwriter of the Year. Dawn Tyler Watson won Blues Album of the Year for Mad Love. Dominique Fils-Aimé won Vocal Jazz Album of the Year for Stay Tuned!. Jessie Reyez, Tory Lanez and Tainy won R&B/Soul Recording of the Year for "Feel It Too".

=== July ===
- On July 5, Cleveland Eaton died at the age of 80.
- On July 6, Charlie Daniels died at the age of 83.
- On July 8, Naya Rivera died at the age of 33.
- On July 10, Steve Sutherland died at the age of 58. Eddie Gale died at the age of 78.
- On July 18, the 2020 Libera Awards were held. Sudan Archives won Best R&B Album for Athena. Tinariwen won Best World Album for Amadjar. Flying Lotus won Creative Packaging for Flamagra.
- On July 21, Mieko Hirota died at the age of 73.
- On July 24, Barry St. John died at the age of 76.

=== August ===
- On August 7, the 26th Annual South African Music Awards were held. Blaq Diamond won Record Of The Year for Ibhanoyi. Ami Faku won Female Artist of the Year. Lungisa Xhamela won Best R&B/Soul Album for My Heart to Your Soul.
- On August 16, Emman Nimedez died at the age of 21.
- On August 18, Hal Singer died at the age of 100.
- On August 22, D. J. Rogers died at the age of 72.
- On August 23, Charlie Persip died at the age of 91.
- On August 30, the 2020 MTV Video Music Awards were held. The Weeknd won Video of the Year and Best R&B for "Blinding Lights". Doja Cat won Push Best New Artist. Ariana Grande and Justin Bieber won Best Music Video from Home for "Stuck with U". H.E.R. won Video for Good for "I Can't Breathe".

=== September ===
- On September 6, Bruce Williamson died at the age of 49.
- On September 7, the 2020 iHeartRadio Music Awards were held. Lizzo won Song of the Year for "Truth Hurts" and Best New Pop Artist. Post Malone won Male Artist of the Year and Most Thumbed Up Artist of the Year. Post Malone and Swae Lee won Most Thumbed Up Song of the Year for "Sunflower". Khalid won R&B Album of the Year for Free Spirit. H.E.R. won R&B Artist of the Year. Chris Brown and Drake won R&B Song of the Year for "No Guidance". Summer Walker won Best New R&B Artist.
- On September 9, Ronald Bell died at the age of 68.
- On September 11, Toots Hibbert died at the age of 77. Sandra Dianne died at the age of 25.
- On September 12, Edna Wright died at the age of 75.
- On September 16, Roy C died at the age of 81.
- On September 21, Tommy DeVito died at the age of 92. Roy Head died at the age of 79.
- On September 22, Gerson King Combo died at the age of 76.
- On September 23, Guitar Crusher died at the age of 89.
- On September 24, Max Merritt died at the age of 79.
- On September 29, Rocco Prestia died at the age of 69.

=== October ===
- On October 1, the AIR Awards of 2020 were held. Julia Jacklin won Best Independent Blues and Roots Album or EP for Crushing. Caiti Baker won Best Independent Soul/R&B Album or EP for The Dust (Pt. 1).
- On October 6, Johnny Nash died at the age of 80.
- On October 11, Harold Betters died at the age of 92.
- On October 12, Kim Massie died at the age of 62. The 13th PMPC Star Awards for Music were held. Moira Dela Torre won Album of the Year for Patawad, Song of the Year and Music Video of the Year for "Paubaya", and Female Recording Artist of the Year. Leila Alcasid won RnB Album of the Year for Better Weather. Garth Garcia and JV Decena won RnB Male Artist of the Year. Kiana Valenciano won RnB Female Artist of the Year.
- On October 14, the 2020 Billboard Music Awards were held. Post Malone won Top Artist, Top Billboard 200 Artist, Top Hot 100 Artist, Top Streaming Songs Artist, and Top Male Artist. Lizzo won Top Song Sales Artist. BTS won Top Social Artist. Khalid won Top R&B Album for Free Spirit, Top R&B Song for "Talk", Top R&B Artist, Top R&B Male Artist, and Top R&B Tour. Summer Walker won Top R&B Female Artist.
- On October 19, Spencer Davis died at the age of 81.
- On October 26, Stan Kesler died at the age of 92. Ted White died at the age of 89.
- On October 29, the 2020 MTV Video Music Awards Japan were held. Fujii Kaze won Best R&B video for "Nan-Nan". The Weeknd won Best International Male video for "Blinding Lights".

=== November ===
- On November 1, Ronnie Peel died at the age of 74.
- On November 5, the 2020 UK Music Video Awards were held. Berwyn won Best R&B/Soul Video - UK for "Trap Phone". Yseult won Best R&B/Soul Video - International for "Corps". Greentea Peng won Best R&B/Soul Video - Newcomer for "Mr Sun (miss da sun)". Beyoncé, Shatta Wale and Major Lazer won Best Styling in a Video for "Already". The Weeknd won Best Live Video for "Heartless (Live)".
- On November 8, the 2020 MTV Europe Music Awards were held. Doja Cat won Best New Act. H.E.R. won Video for Good for "I Can't Breathe". Zara Larsson won Best Nordic Act. Matt Pokora won Best French Act. Fernando Daniel won Best Portuguese Act. Little Mix won Best UK & Ireland Act. Benee won Best New Zealand Act. Danna Paola won Best Latin America North Act.
- On November 11, Andrew White died at the age of 78.
- On November 15, the 46th People's Choice Awards were held. Ariana Grande won The Female Artist of 2020. Doja Cat won The New Artist of 2020. The 2020 Aotearoa Music Awards were held. Benee won Best Solo Artist and the Recorded Music NZ International Achievement. Haz & Miloux won Best Soul / RnB Artist. Drax Project won Highest selling Artist and NZ On Air Radio Airplay Record of the Year.
- On November 16, Bruce Swedien died at the age of 86. Paul Fernando died at the age of 68.
- On November 22, the American Music Awards of 2020 were held. Doja Cat won New Artist of the Year and Favorite Female Artist – Soul/R&B. The Weeknd won Favorite Song – Soul/R&B for "Heartless", Favorite Album – Soul/R&B for After Hours, and Favorite Male Artist – Soul/R&B.
- On November 25, the 2020 ARIA Music Awards were held. Miiesha won Best Soul/R&B Release for Nyaaringu. Sampa the Great won Best Independent Release for The Return and Best Female Artist. The Teskey Brothers won Best Blues & Roots Album for Live at the Forum.
- On November 29, the 2020 Soul Train Music Awards were held. Monica won the Lady Of Soul Award. Snoh Aalegra won Best New Artist. Brandy won the Soul Train Certified Award. H.E.R. won The Ashford And Simpson Songwriter's Award for "I Can't Breathe" and Best R&B/Soul Female Artist. Chris Brown won Best R&B/Soul Male Artist. Chris Brown and Young Thug won Song Of The Year, Best Dance Performance, and Best Collaboration Performance for "Go Crazy". Kirk Franklin won Best Gospel/Inspirational Award. Summer Walker won Album Of The Year for Over It. Beyoncé, SAINt JHN, Wizkid and Blue Ivy won Video Of The Year for "Brown Skin Girl".

=== December ===
- On December 3, Ron Mathewson died at the age of 76.
- On December 5, the LOS40 Music Awards 2020 were held. Aya Nakamura won Best New International Act. The Weeknd won Best International Video for "Blinding Lights".
- On December 6, the 2020 Mnet Asian Music Awards were held. BTS won Album of the Year for Map of the Soul: 7, Artist of the Year, Worldwide Icon of the Year, and Best Male Group. IU won Best Female Artist. Baekhyun won Best Male Artist. Hwasa won Best Dance Performance – Solo for "Maria". Rizky Febian won Best Indonesian Artist. G.E.M. won Best Mandarin Artist. Fujii Kaze won Best New Japanese Artist. BoA won the Inspired Achievement Award. Monsta X won Best Stage.
- On December 7, Howard Wales died at the age of 77. Dick Allen died at the age of 78.
- On December 8, the Music Victoria Awards of 2020 were held. Sampa the Great won Best Victorian Album and Best Soul, Funk, R'n'B and Gospel Album for The Return, Best Victorian Song for "OMG", and Best Solo Artist. Lloyd Spiegel won Best Blues Album for Cut and Run.
- On December 15, Irving Banister died at the age of 87.
- On December 23, Leslie West died at the age of 75.
- On December 27, Richard Lewis Spencer died at the age of 78.
- On December 29, Rudy Salas died at the age of 71.

== Released albums ==
=== January ===
Day	Artist(s)	Album	Record label(s)
6	Ateez	Treasure Epilogue: Action to Answer	KQ
7	SF9	First Collection	FNC, Kakao M
10	Devon Gilfillian	Black Hole Rainbow	Capitol
10	Selena Gomez	Rare	Interscope
13	Nick Cannon	The Miseducation Of The Negro You Love To Hate	Csalohcin
17	070 Shake	Modus Vivendi	GOOD, Def Jam
17	A Girl Called Eddy	Been Around	Altafonte
17	Halsey	Manic	Capitol
17	Louise	Heavy Love	Lil Lou, Warner
17	Mac Miller	Circles	Remember, Warner
17	Marcus King	El Dorado	Easy Eye Sound, Fantasy
17	Theophilus London	Bebey	Independent
24	J Hus	Big Conspiracy	Black Butter
24	Junia-T	Studio Monk	Bare Wizardry
24	Khushi	Strange Seasons	Warner
24	Sam Cooke	The Complete Keen Years (1957-1960)	ABKCO
24	Soul Motivators	Do the Damn Thing	Do Right
24	Tauren Wells	Citizen of Heaven	Provident
31	Elodie	This Is Elodie	Island
31	K. Michelle	All Monsters Are Human	Chase Landin, No Color No Sound
31	Luke James	To Feel Love/d	Culture Collective, Howling Nights
31	Meghan Trainor	Treat Myself	Epic
31	Prophet	Don't Forget It	Stones Throw
31	Ryan Beatty	Dreaming of David	Mad Love, Interscope
31	Son Little	Aloha	Anti-
31	The Meters	Gettin' Funkier All the Time: The Complete Josie/Reprise & Warner Recordings 1968-1977	Warner, X5

=== February ===
Day	Artist(s)	Album	Record label(s)
3	GFriend	Labyrinth	Source, Kakao M
7	Antibalas	Fu Chronicles	Daptone
7	Brent Faiyaz	Fuck the World	Lost Kids
7	Frazey Ford	U kin B the Sun	Arts & Crafts
7	Khruangbin & Leon Bridges	Texas Sun	Dead Oceans, LisaSawyer63
7	Oh Wonder	No One Else Can Wear Your Crown	Island
7	Prince Royce	Alter Ego	Sony Latin
14	A Boogie wit da Hoodie	Artist 2.0	Atlantic, Highbridge
14	Chike	Boo of the Booless	Self-released
14	Justin Bieber	Changes	Def Jam, RBMG
14	Mhysa	Nevaeh	Hyperdub
14	Tame Impala	The Slow Rush	Modular, Island Australia, Interscope, Fiction, Caroline
14	Tami Neilson	Chickaboom!	Outside
14	The Heliocentrics	Infinity of Now	Madlib Invazion
14	Tink	Hopeless Romantic	Winter's Diary, Empire
21	BTS	Map of the Soul: 7	Big Hit
21	Cezinando	Et godt stup i et grunt vann	1111klubb
21	The Staple Singers	Come Go with Me: The Stax Collection	Craft
28	Ant Clemons	Happy 2 Be Here	Legion, Human Re Sources
28	Berita	Songs in the Key of Love	Assali
28	Chiiild	Synthetic Soul	Avant Garden, Island
28	Robert Cray	That's What I Heard	Nozzle
28	Surfaces	Horizons	10K Projects
28	The Allman Brothers Band	Trouble No More: 50th Anniversary Collection	Mercury

=== March ===
Day	Artist(s)	Album	Record label(s)
6	Jhené Aiko	Chilombo	2 Fish Artclub, Def Jam
6	Megan Thee Stallion	Suga	1501 Certified, 300
6	NCT 127	Neo Zone	SM, Dreamus, Caroline
6	Paul Heaton & Jacqui Abbott	Manchester Calling	Virgin EMI
6	Swamp Dogg	Sorry You Couldn't Make It	Noise, Pioneer
6	The James Hunter Six	Nick of Time	Daptone
6	U.S. Girls	Heavy Light	4AD
13	Don Toliver	Heaven or Hell	Cactus Jack
13	Monophonics	It's Only Us	Colemine
18	Lead	Singularity	Pony Canyon
20	Adam Lambert	Velvet	More Is More, Empire
20	Fleur East	Fearless	Platinum East, Ingrooves
20	Hare Squead	Superweird	Self-released
20	The Weeknd	After Hours	XO, Republic
20	Tokimonsta	Oasis Nocturno	Young Art
20	Tower of Power	Step Up	Mack Avenue
22	Childish Gambino	3.15.20	RCA
22	IceJJFish	Jesus Is The Way	Self-released
24	Witch Prophet	DNA Activation	Heart Lake
26	Trevor Daniel	Nicotine	Alamo, Interscope
27	Cleo Sol	Rose in the Dark	Forever Living Originals
27	Giveon	Take Time	Epic
27	Jessie Reyez	Before Love Came to Kill Us	Fmly, Island
27	Keiyaa	Forever, Ya Girl	Forever
27	Knxwledge	1988	Stones Throw
27	Little Dragon	New Me, Same Us	Ninja Tune
27	Melt Yourself Down	100% Yes	Decca
27	Moira Dela Torre	Patawad	Star Music
27	Orion Sun	Hold Space For Me	Mom+Pop
27	Oxlade	Oxygene	Troniq, The Plug
27	PartyNextDoor	Partymobile	OVO, Warner

=== April ===
Day	Artist(s)	Album	Record label(s)
1	Brymo	Yellow	Independent
3	Black Atlass	Dream Awake	XO
3	Empress Of	I'm Your Empress Of	Terrible, XL
3	Kiana Ledé	Kiki	Heavy, Republic
3	Nnamdï	Brat	Sooper
3	Rod Wave	Pray 4 Love	Alamo, Geffen, Interscope
3	Sam Hunt	Southside	MCA Nashville
3	Thundercat	It Is What It Is	Brainfeeder
3	Yves Tumor	Heaven to a Tortured Mind	Warp
6	Max Changmin	Chocolate	SM, Dreamus
9	Winner	Remember	YG, YGEX
10	Active Child	In Another Life	Sony
10	Ambar Lucid	Garden of Lucid	Self-released
10	Brian Culbertson	XX	BCM
10	Pip Millett	Lost In June	+Fours
10	Pokey LaFarge	Rock Bottom Rhapsody	New West
10	Shawn Stockman	Foreword	Rosewood
13	Apink	Look	Play M
17	Dvsn	A Muse in Her Feelings	OVO Sound
17	Kierra Sheard	Kierra	Karew, RCA Inspiration
17	Rina Sawayama	Sawayama	Dirty Hit, Avex Trax
17	RJD2	The Fun Ones	Self-released
17	Shabazz Palaces	The Don of Diamond Dreams	Sub Pop
17	Shelby Lynne	Shelby Lynne	Everso Records, Thirty Tigers
17	The-Dream	SXTP4	Radio Killa
20	Smino	She Already Decided	Self-released
24	Alina Baraz	It Was Divine	Mom+Pop
24	Cassowary	Cassowary	Fat Possum
24	John Carroll Kirby	My Garden	Stones Throw
24	K Camp	Kiss Five	Rare Sound, Interscope
24	Kali Uchis	To Feel Alive	Virgin EMI, Interscope
24	Nieman J & Eric Bellinger	Optimal Music	Off Top
24	Tom Misch & Yussef Dayes	What Kinda Music	Beyond the Groove, Blue Note, Caroline
29	NCT Dream	Reload	SM, Dreamus

=== May ===
Day	Artist(s)	Album	Record label(s)
1	Chicano Batman	Invisible People	ATO
1	Drake	Dark Lane Demo Tapes	OVO, Republic
1	JoJo	Good to Know	Clover, Warner
1	Leven Kali	Hightide	Interscope
5	Chris Brown & Young Thug	Slime & B	CBE, RCA
8	Buscabulla	Regresa	Ribbon
8	El Michels Affair	Adult Themes	Big Crown
8	Hayley Williams	Petals for Armor	Atlantic
8	Kehlani	It Was Good Until It Wasn't	Atlantic
8	Pantayo	Pantayo	Telephone Explosion
9	Sidhu Moose Wala	Snitches Get Stitches	Self-released
15	Ana Popović	Live for Live	ArtisteXclusive
15	Jonah Mutono	Gerg	True Panther, EQT
15	Moses Sumney	Græ	Jagjaguwar
15	Mourning [A] BLKstar	The Cycle	Don Giovanni
15	Nick Hakim	Will This Make Me Good	ATO
15	Perfume Genius	Set My Heart on Fire Immediately	Matador
15	The Teskey Brothers	Live at the Forum	Ivy League
18	Tomorrow X Together	The Dream Chapter: Eternity	Big Hit, Republic
20	Fujii Kaze	Help Ever Hurt Never	Hehn, Universal Sigma
20	Ryu Su-jeong	Tiger Eyes	Woollim, Kakao M
22	Mk.gee	A Museum of Contradiction	Iamsound, Interscope
22	Omah Lay	Get Layd	KeyQaad, Sire
25	Baekhyun	Delight	SM, Dreamus
26	Monsta X	Fantasia X	Starship
29	Mahmundi	Mundo Novo	Universal
29	Miiesha	Nyaaringu	EMI Australia
29	Nicole Atkins	Italian Ice	Single Lock
29	Ro James	Mantic	ByStorm, RCA

=== June ===
Day	Artist(s)	Album	Record label(s)
3	Chloe x Halle	Ungodly Hour	Parkwood, Columbia
5	Bruno Major	To Let A Good Thing Die	Harbour, AWAL
9	WayV	Awaken the World	Label V, SM, Dreamus
10	Mr Eazi	One Day You Will Understand	EmPawa Africa
12	Naeem	Startisha	37d03d
12	Norah Jones	Pick Me Up Off the Floor	Blue Note
18	Weki Meki	Hide and Seek	Fantagio, Kakao M
19	Don Bryant	You Make Me Feel	Fat Possum
19	John Legend	Bigger Love	Columbia
19	Sault	Untitled (Black Is)	Forever Living Originals
19	Teyana Taylor	The Album	Getting Out Our Dreams, Def Jam
26	6lack	6pc Hot	LVRN, Interscope
26	August Alsina	The Product III: State of Emergency	Empire
26	CeeLo Green	CeeLo Green Is Thomas Callaway	Easy Eye Sound, BMG
26	Ego Ella May	Honey For Wounds	Self-released
26	Haim	Women in Music Pt. III	Columbia
26	Jessie Ware	What's Your Pleasure?	PMR, EMI
26	Raleigh Ritchie	Andy	Alacran
26	Tyler Carter	Moonshine Acoustic	Rise
26	Vanessa Amorosi	The Blacklisted Collection	Self-released
29	Hwasa	María	RBW

=== July ===
Day	Artist(s)	Album	Record label(s)
3	Denai Moore	Modern Dread	Because
3	Gaika	Seguridad	Naafi
3	Siti Nurhaliza	ManifestaSITI2020	SNP, Universal Music Malaysia
10	Avant	Can We Fall in Love	Mo-B
10	Dinner Party	Dinner Party	Sounds of Crenshaw, Empire
10	Kacy Hill	Is It Selfish If We Talk About Me Again	Self-released
10	Nikki Yanofsky	Turn Down the Sound	eOne
10	Summer Walker	Life on Earth	LVRN, Interscope
13	Exo-SC	1 Billion Views	SM, Dreamus
17	Joy Oladokun	In Defense of My Own Happiness (The Beginnings)	White Boy, Amigo, Verve Forecast
17	Kllo	Maybe We Could	Ghostly
17	Lianne La Havas	Lianne La Havas	Warner UK
17	Zara McFarlane	Songs of an Unknown Tongue	Brownswood
21	Yukika	Soul Lady	Estimate, Dreamus
24	Jessy Lanza	All The Time	Hyperdub
24	Kamaal Williams	Wu Hen	Black Focus
30	Mozzik	Mozzart	2 Euro Gang, Urban
31	Akon	Ain't No Peace	Konvict Kulture
31	Brandy	B7	Brand Nu, Entertainment One
31	Dominic Fike	What Could Possibly Go Wrong	Columbia
31	Eddie Chacon	Pleasure, Joy and Happiness	Day End
31	Liv.e	Couldn't Wait to Tell You	In Real Life Music
31	Thanya Iyer	Kind	Topshelf

=== August ===
Day	Artist(s)	Album	Record label(s)
7	Glass Animals	Dreamland	Wolf Tone, Polydor
7	Tiana Major9	At Sixes and Sevens	Motown
7	Tkay Maidza	Last Year Was Weird (Vol. 2)	4AD
7	Victoria Monét	Jaguar	Tribe
10	Han Seung-woo	Fame	Play M
14	Burna Boy	Twice as Tall	Spaceship, Bad Habit, Atlantic, Warner
14	Busty and the Bass	Eddie	Arts & Crafts
14	Casey MQ	Babycasey	Halocline Trance
14	Fantastic Negrito	Have You Lost Your Mind Yet?	Cooking Vinyl
14	Holly Humberstone	Falling Asleep at the Wheel	Platoon
14	Jacob Collier	Djesse Vol. 3	Hajanga
19	EXID	B.L.E.S.S.E.D	Tokuma Japan Communications
20	Fireboy DML	Apollo	YBNL Nation, Empire
21	Blackbear	Everything Means Nothing	Beartrap, Alamo, Interscope
21	Duckwrth	SuperGood	Republic
21	Nubya Garcia	Source	Concord Jazz
27	Tiwa Savage	Celia	Motown, Island, UMG, Capitol
28	Aluna	Renaissance	Mad Decent
28	Bettye LaVette	Blackbirds	Verve
28	Bobby Rush	Rawer than Raw	Deep Rush
28	Cazzu	Una Niña Inútil	Machete, Universal Latino
28	Dan Penn	Living on Mercy	Last Music
28	Disclosure	Energy	Island
28	Durand Bernarr	Dur&	Dsing
28	Galimatias	Renaissance Boy	Self-released
28	Gregory Porter	All Rise	Blue Note, Decca
28	Jyoti	Mama, You Can Bet!	SomeOthaShip
28	Kem	Love Always Wins	Motown
28	Ledisi	The Wild Card	Listen Back
28	PJ Morton	Gospel According to PJ: From the Songbook of PJ Morton	Empire
28	Ricky Reed	The Room	Nice Life
28	Sevdaliza	Shabrang	Twisted Elegance
28	Toni Braxton	Spell My Name	Island
28	Toots and the Maytals	Got to Be Tough	Trojan Jamaica, BMG

=== September ===
Day	Artist(s)	Album	Record label(s)
4	Jacquees	Exit 68	Self-released
4	Joy Denalane	Let Yourself Be Loved	Motown
4	Wonho	Love Synonym Pt.1: Right for Me	Highline, Kakao M
6	Bilal & HighBreedMusic	Voyage-19	Self-released
7	Taemin	Never Gonna Dance Again	SM, Dreamus
10	Niki	Moonchild	88rising, 12Tone
11	Gettomasa	Kalamies	PME
11	Loren Oden & Adrian Younge	My Heart, My Love	Linear Labs
11	Paul Epworth	Voyager	Columbia
16	Amanda Magalhães	Fragma	Boia Fria Produções, Warner
18	Alicia Keys	Alicia	RCA
18	Joan Osborne	Trouble and Strife	Thirty Tigers, Womanly Hips
18	Keith Urban	The Speed of Now Part 1	Hit Red, Capitol Nashville
18	Lido	Peder	Because
18	Max	Colour Vision	Sony
18	Sault	Untitled (Rise)	Forever Living Originals
18	Steve Arrington	Down to the Lowest Terms: The Soul Sessions	Stones Throw
18	Yellow Days	A Day In A Yellow Beat	Sony
23	Bantu	Everybody Get Agenda	Soledad
23	BDC	The Intersection: Belief	Brand New Music, Kakao M
25	Dylan Sinclair	Proverb	Five Stone
25	Joji	Nectar	88rising
25	Left at London	Transgender Street Legend, Vol. 2	Self-released
25	Rituals of Mine	Hype Nostalgia	Carpark
25	Spillage Village	Spilligion	Dreamville, Interscope, SinceThe80s
25	Tems	For Broken Ears	Leading Vibes
25	Tory Lanez	Daystar	One Umbrella
25	The War and Treaty	Hearts Town	Rounder
25	Wejdene	16	Universal Music France

=== October ===
Day	Artist(s)	Album	Record label(s)
2	Aloe Blacc	All Love Everything	BMG
2	Bartees Strange	Live Forever	Memory Music
2	Blackpink	The Album	YG, Interscope
2	Bryson Tiller	Anniversary	RCA
2	Gabriel Garzón-Montano	Agüita	Jagjaguwar
2	Giveon	When It's All Said and Done	Epic
2	Mariah Carey	The Rarities	Columbia, Legacy
2	Nathy Peluso	Calambre	Sony
8	Weki Meki	New Rules	Fantagio, Kakao M
9	The Budos Band	Long in the Tooth	Diamond West
9	Kiiara	Lil Kiiwi	Atlantic
9	Trey Songz	Back Home	Atlantic
16	Lous and the Yakuza	Gore	Columbia
16	Mario	Closer to Mars	New Citizen
16	Peppermint	A Girl Like Me: Letters to My Lovers	Producer Entertainment Group
16	Tommy Lee	Andro	Better Noise
21	Tobi	Elements Vol. 1	RCA, Same Plate
23	Dej Loaf	Sell Sole II	Yellow World, BMG
23	Ginger Root	Rikki	Acrophase
23	Gorillaz	Song Machine, Season One: Strange Timez	Parlophone, Warner
23	Luh Kel	L.O.V.E.	Cinematic
23	They	The Amanda Tape	Avant Garden, Island
23	Ty Dolla Sign	Featuring Ty Dolla Sign	Atlantic
23	Xavier Omär	If You Feel	RCA
26	Tomorrow X Together	Minisode1: Blue Hour	Big Hit, Republic
26	Twice	Eyes Wide Open	JYP, Dreamus, Republic
30	Ariana Grande	Positions	Republic
30	Eric Bellinger	Eric B for President: Term 3	YFS, Empire
30	JoJo	December Baby	Clover, Warner
30	Léon	Apart	BMG
30	Mino	Take	YG
30	Omarion	The Kinection	Create
30	Petit Biscuit	Parachute	Écurie
30	Queen Naija	Missunderstood	Capitol
30	Sam Smith	Love Goes	Capitol
30	Tori Kelly	A Tori Kelly Christmas	Capitol, Schoolboy
30	Wizkid	Made in Lagos	RCA
31	Nadine Lustre	Wildest Dreams	Careless Music

=== November ===
Day	Artist(s)	Album	Record label(s)
2	Monsta X	Fatal Love	Starship
6	Little Mix	Confetti	RCA
6	Phora	With Love 2	Self-released
6	Tiziano Ferro	Accetto miracoli: l'esperienza degli altri	Virgin, Universal
9	Taemin	Never Gonna Dance Again: Act 2	SM
12	Amaarae	The Angel You Don't Know	Golden Child
12	Lali	Libra	Sony Argentina
13	Aya Nakamura	Aya	Rec. 118, Parlophone, Warner Music France
13	Benee	Hey u x	Republic
13	DaniLeigh	Movie	Def Jam
13	Masego	Studying Abroad	UMG, EQT
13	Paloma Faith	Infinite Things	Sony UK
13	Randall Bramblett	Pine Needle Fire	New West
13	Rauw Alejandro	Afrodisíaco	Sony Latin, Duars
13	Vivian Green	Love Absolute	SoNo, Make Noise
16	Love Renaissance	Home for the Holidays	LVRN
18	Henry	Journey	Monster, Kakao M
18	Kali Uchis	Sin Miedo (del Amor y Otros Demonios)	EMI, Interscope
20	Babeheaven	Home for Now	Self-released
20	BTS	Be	Big Hit
20	Jimi Hendrix	Live in Maui	Sony
20	Omah Lay	What Have We Done	KeyQaad, Sire
20	Raheem DeVaughn	What A Time To Be In Love	New Era Soul, DMG
20	Raye	Euphoric Sad Songs	Polydor
20	Saint Jhn	While the World Was Burning	GØdd Complexx, Hitco, WMG
20	Shygirl	Alias	Because, Nuxxe
20	Tayla Parx	Coping Mechanisms	Atlantic
23	NCT	NCT 2020 Resonance	SM
25	JO1	The Star	Lapone
25	Tinashe	Comfort & Joy	Self-released
27	Sabrina Claudio	Christmas Blues	SC, Atlantic
30	Enhypen	Border: Day One	Belift Lab, Genie Music, Stone Music
30	Got7	Breath of Love: Last Piece	JYP
30	Kai	Kai	SM, Dreamus
30	Simmy	Tugela Fairy (Made of Stars)	EL World Music, Sony

=== December ===
Day	Artist(s)	Album	Record label(s)
1	BoA	Better	SM
2	Koda Kumi	Angel + Monster	Rhythm Zone
3	Phùng Khánh Linh	Yesteryear	Times
4	Khruangbin	Late Night Tales: Khruangbin	Night Time Stories
4	Mica Paris	Gospel	East West, Warner
4	Rico Nasty	Nightmare Vacation	APG, Atlantic, Sugar Trap
4	T-Pain	The Lost Remixes	Nappy Boy, RCA
10	Tekno	Old Romance	Island, Cartel
10	Yerin Baek	Tellusboutyourself	Blue Vinyl, Dreamus
11	Fana Hues	Hues	Sweet Virtue, Westminster, Bright Antenna
11	Jeremih & Chance the Rapper	Merry Christmas Lil Mama: The Gift That Keeps on Giving	Self-released
11	Terrace Martin	Village Days	Sounds of Crenshaw, Empire
14	Kim Sung-kyu	Inside Me	Woollim
14	Xamã	Zodíaco	Bagua
15	Taeyeon	What Do I Call You	SM, Dreamus
18	Mike Posner	Operation: Wake Up	Monster Mountain
23	Miho Nakayama	All Time Best	King
24	Eito	Sukkarakan	A.S.A.B
25	Tink	A Gift and a Curse	WD, Empire

== Highest-charting songs ==
=== United States ===
R&B songs from any year which charted in the 2020 Top 40 of the Billboard Hot 100
Song	Artist	Project	Peak position
"Blinding Lights"	The Weeknd	After Hours	1
"Say So"	Doja Cat featuring Nicki Minaj	Hot Pink	1
"Stuck with U"	Ariana Grande and Justin Bieber	—N/a	1
"Positions"	Ariana Grande	Positions	1
"Yummy"	Justin Bieber	Changes	2
"Holy"	Justin Bieber featuring Chance the Rapper	Justice	3
"Intentions"	Justin Bieber featuring Quavo	Changes	5
"In Your Eyes"	The Weeknd	After Hours	16
"After Hours"	The Weeknd	After Hours	20
"Alone Again"	The Weeknd	After Hours	21
"Believe It"	PartyNextDoor and Rihanna	Partymobile	23
"B.S."	Jhené Aiko featuring H.E.R.	Chilombo	24
"Forever"	Justin Bieber featuring Post Malone and Clever	Changes	24
"Scared to Live"	The Weeknd	After Hours	24
"Hardest to Love"	The Weeknd	After Hours	25
"Not You Too"	Drake featuring Chris Brown	Dark Lane Demo Tapes	25
"Desires"	Drake featuring Future	Dark Lane Demo Tapes	27
"Too Late"	The Weeknd	After Hours	28
"Hit Different"	SZA featuring Ty Dolla Sign	—N/a	29
"Time Flies"	Drake	Dark Lane Demo Tapes	30
"Snowchild"	The Weeknd	After Hours	32
"Motive"	Ariana Grande and Doja Cat	Positions	32
"Off the Table"	Ariana Grande and the Weeknd	Positions	35
"Black Parade"	Beyoncé	—N/a	37
"Escape from LA"	The Weeknd	After Hours	39
"Diamonds"	Sam Smith	Love Goes	39
"Pussy Fairy (OTW)"	Jhené Aiko	Chilombo	40

=== United Kingdom ===
R&B songs from any year which charted in the 2020 Top 10 of the UK Singles Chart
Song	Artist	Project	Peak position
"Boyfriend"	Mabel	High Expectations	10

== Highest first-week consumption ==
List of albums with the highest first-week consumption (sales + streaming + track equivalent), as of December 2020 in the United States
Number	Album	Artist	1st-week consumption	1st-week position	Refs
1	After Hours	The Weeknd	444,000	1	
2	Map of the Soul: 7	BTS	422,000	1	
3	Be	BTS	242,000	1	
4	Changes	Justin Bieber	231,000	1	
5	Dark Lane Demo Tapes	Drake	223,000	2	
6	Circles	Mac Miller	164,000	3	
7	Chilombo	Jhené Aiko	152,000	2	
8	Artist 2.0	A Boogie wit da Hoodie	111,000	2	
9	Nectar	Joji	92,000	3	
10	It Was Good Until It Wasn't	Kehlani	83,000	2	

== All critically reviewed albums ranked ==
=== Metacritic ===
Number	Artist	Album	Average score	Number of reviews	Reference
1	Sault	Untitled (Rise)	93	6 reviews	
2	The Staple Singers	Come Go with Me: The Stax Collection	88	5 reviews	
3	Sault	Untitled (Black Is)	86	5 reviews	
4	The James Hunter Six	Nick of Time	85	7 reviews	
5	Sam Cooke	The Complete Keen Years (1957-1960)	85	4 reviews	
6	Thundercat	It Is What It Is	84	23 reviews	
7	Jyoti	Mama, You Can Bet!	84	7 reviews	
8	The Budos Band	Long in the Tooth	84	6 reviews	
9	The Heliocentrics	Infinity of Now	84	5 reviews	
10	Liv.e	Couldn't Wait to Tell You	84	5 reviews	
11	Moses Sumney	Græ	84	5 reviews	
12	Adam Lambert	Velvet	84	4 reviews	
13	Randall Bramblett	Pine Needle Fire	84	4 reviews	
14	Lianne La Havas	Lianne La Havas	83	19 reviews	
15	Childish Gambino	3.15.20	83	16 reviews	
16	Don Bryant	You Make Me Feel	83	7 reviews	
17	Buscabulla	Regresa	83	6 reviews	
18	Jimi Hendrix	Live in Maui	83	5 reviews	
19	Jessie Reyez	Before Love Came to Kill Us	82	10 reviews	
20	Victoria Monét	Jaguar	82	7 reviews	
21	The Meters	Gettin' Funkier All the Time: The Complete Josie/Reprise & Warner Recordings 1968-1977	82	4 reviews	
22	Chloe x Halle	Ungodly Hour	81	9 reviews	
23	Melt Yourself Down	100% Yes	81	6 reviews	
24	The Weeknd	After Hours	80	20 reviews	
25	Dan Penn	Living on Mercy	80	6 reviews	
26	Monophonics	It's Only Us	80	6 reviews	
27	Son Little	Aloha	80	5 reviews	
28	Antibalas	Fu Chronicles	80	4 reviews	
29	Swamp Dogg	Sorry You Couldn't Make It	79	8 reviews	
30	Ty Dolla Sign	Featuring Ty Dolla Sign	79	7 reviews	
31	Bettye LaVette	Blackbirds	78	7 reviews	
32	Brandy	B7	78	6 reviews	
33	Teyana Taylor	The Album	78	6 reviews	
34	Dvsn	A Muse in Her Feelings	78	5 reviews	
35	Kehlani	It Was Good Until It Wasn't	77	13 reviews	
36	Alicia Keys	Alicia	77	12 reviews	
37	6lack	6pc Hot	77	5 reviews	
38	Naeem	Startisha	76	8 reviews	
39	Khruangbin & Leon Bridges	Texas Sun	76	6 reviews	
40	Nick Hakim	Will This Make Me Good	75	7 reviews	
41	Mhysa	Nevaeh	75	5 reviews	
42	Steve Arrington	Down to the Lowest Terms: The Soul Sessions	75	5 reviews	
43	Summer Walker	Life on Earth	75	4 reviews	
44	Mariah Carey	The Rarities	74	6 reviews	
45	Dinner Party	Dinner Party	74	4 reviews	
46	Toni Braxton	Spell My Name	71	6 reviews	
47	Soul Motivators	Do the Damn Thing	70	4 reviews	
48	Khruangbin	Late Night Tales: Khruangbin	69	5 reviews	
49	Brent Faiyaz	Fuck the World	67	5 reviews	
50	John Legend	Bigger Love	59	7 reviews	

== See also ==
- Next article: 2021 in rhythm and blues
