= John Kennedy (radio broadcaster) =

British radio DJ (born 1965)

- Born: 1 June 1965 (age 61)
- Presenting career
- Show: X-Posure
- Station: Radio X
- Country: United Kingdom
- Website: www.radiox.co.uk/radio/shows-presenters/xposure

John Kennedy (born 1 June 1965) is a British radio presenter, DJ and podcast host. He is best known for his longstanding role as the host of the music show X-Posure on Radio X and for the music podcast Tape Notes.

Kennedy is cited as being the first to give radio play to numerous artists including Adele, The xx, Razorlight, Kate Nash, The Ting Tings, The Futureheads, Dan le Sac Vs Scroobius Pip and Mumford & Sons.

== Career ==
=== Radio ===
Kennedy initially worked as a disc jockey regularly holding club nights while studying at University in Norwich. Following this, he undertook a media course run by Community Service Volunteers in South East London where he was given the opportunity to begin broadcasting a music show on Radio Thamesmead (later renamed RTM Radio). His show ‘Sharp As A Needle’ was named after the Barmy Army track of the same name was broadcast weekly across London and Kent.

In 1991, Kennedy met Sammy Jacobs, a former pirate broadcaster and radio controller at Reading Festival, who had just obtained a restricted service license to operate XFM radio station. After taking on a slot within the Reading Festival Radio Presenter Team, Kennedy was hired by Jacobs for his new channel, XFM (now Radio X).

XFM gained its FM licence and became full time on 1 September 1997 with Kennedy's first broadcast following in 1999. Kennedy is the only member of the current presenting team who has been with the station continuously throughout its years and hosts its longest-running specialist show.

=== X-Posure ===
Kennedy is the presenter of the new music show X-Posure on Radio X, currently broadcasting on Friday and Saturday nights from 11pm to 2am. The show introduces music from up-and-coming artists primarily, although not exclusively, from alternative and indie styles, and regularly includes live sessions and interviews.

Over the years the show has featured a huge range of artists and Kennedy has been credited with discovering countless musicians who have gone on to find success, including the likes of Adele, The xx, Razorlight, Kate Nash, The Ting Tings, The Futureheads, Dan Le Sac Vs Scroobius Pip and Mumford & Sons. The Independent described the show as one of the "most eclectic...on British radio".

=== Compere ===
As well as filling six hours of airtime with new music each week, Kennedy supports new talent with regular X-Posure music nights across London, often taking place at Ben Lovett's (Mumford and Sons) venue Omera. The nights showcase artists in the same vein as his radio show.

In 2016, Kennedy hosted and curated the X-Posure All Dayer, an eight-hour event featuring up to ten up and coming bands at The Camden Barfly in North West London. To celebrate 20 years of X-Posure Kennedy hosted another all-day gig, the X-Posure Summer Party. The event made use of Flat Iron Square's three on-site venues, The Omera, The Outdoor Garden Stage and Apres, and featured artists including Mystery Jets, Temples, Babeheaven and APRE as well as DJ sets from Kennedy as well as fellow Radio X presenter Jack Wood.

From 2009 to 2016 Kennedy compered the Quarry Stage and the Laurel Lounge at In The Woods Festival in Kent, a festival promoting the discovery of artists. Since 2017 Kennedy has hosted the latest output from In The Woods, the music production podcast Tape Notes.

=== Podcasts ===
Kennedy is the host of the podcast Tape Notes, a music production podcast in which artists are reunited with producers to discuss their work together in the studio. Their conversations delve into every stage of the creative process, from the first spark of a song idea, through decisions on instrumentation and style, to finessing the final product. The conversations also feature early demo versions and stems from the original recording sessions. The range of artists featured on Tape Notes includes the likes of Alt-J, The 1975, London Grammar and Kae Tempest as well as producers Dan Carey, Jim Abbiss, Simone Felice and Charlie Andrew.

Among these, Kennedy has hosted two live episodes of Tape Notes, one at Latitude Festival with the alternative band Easy Life and producer Rob Milton, as well as an event at Miloco Studios with the duo Ibeyi and producer Richard Russell in celebration of National Album Day.

=== Journalism ===
Towards the start of his career, Kennedy wrote a regular column for British magazine Dazed & Confused (now Dazed).

== Awards ==
Kennedy was awarded the Time Out Live Award 2005/06 for his live DJ performances and gig curations as part of various X-Posure events.

In 2012, he was presented with the XFM Inspiration Award by Mumford & Sons as part of the radio station's Winter Wonderland event. Before John was presented with the award video messages from artists including Elbow, Paul Weller and The Maccabees were shown.

In 2016 Kennedy became the first-ever recipient of the Arqiva Commercial Radio Music Champion Award in recognition for his dedication to new and independent artists, dating back to the days of Radio X's predecessor XFM in the 1990s.

Kennedy has been heavily involved with the Mercury Prize, the annual music prize awarded for the best album released in the United Kingdom, and has been a regular member of the judging panel since 2009.
