= Hooke's Law (album) =

Studio album by KeiyaA
- Released: October 31, 2025
- Length: 52:28
- Label: XL
- Producer: KeiyaA; DJ Cowriiie

KeiyaA chronology
Forever, Ya Girl (2020)	Hooke's Law (2025)

Hooke's Law is the second studio album by American singer-songwriter and record producer KeiyaA. It was released on October 31, 2025, through XL Recordings. It received universal acclaim from critics.

== Background ==
KeiyaA is an American musician, singer-songwriter, and record producer. Born in Chicago, she is based in New York City. Hooke's Law is her second studio album, following Forever, Ya Girl (2020). It was released on October 31, 2025, through XL Recordings. Music videos were released for the tracks "Stupid Prizes", "Take It", and "K.I.S.S."

== Critical reception ==
Professional ratings
Aggregate scores
Source	Rating
Metacritic	81/100
Review scores
Source	Rating
AllMusic	4/5 stars
The Line of Best Fit	8/10
Paste	8.3/10
Pitchfork	8.1/10
PopMatters	8/10

According to the review aggregator Metacritic, Hooke's Law received "universal acclaim" based on a weighted average score of 81 out of 100 from 9 critic scores.

Allen Hale of The Line of Best Fit stated, "The project exists at the juncture between skeptical, attuned healing and critical reflection, combining inflections drawn from varying shades of contemporary R&B and electronic music." Kate French-Morris of The Quietus wrote, "The album is spacious yet claustrophobic, improvisatory yet focused."

=== Accolades ===
Year-end lists for Hooke's Law
Publication	List	Rank	Ref.
AllMusic	AllMusic Best of 2025	—	
Billboard	20 Best R&B Albums of 2025	19	
BrooklynVegan	BrooklynVegan's Top 55 Albums of 2025	46	
Clash	Albums of the Year 2025	24	
DJ Mag	DJ Mag's Top Albums of 2025	—	
The Guardian	The 50 Best Albums of 2025	28	
The Line of Best Fit	The Best Albums of 2025	10	
Paste	The 50 Best Albums of 2025	43	
Pitchfork	The 50 Best Albums of 2025	40	
Vogue	The 45 Best Albums of 2025	—	

== Track listing ==
All tracks are written by Chakeiya Richmond, except where noted.

Hooke's Law track listing
No.	Title	Writer(s)	Length
1.	"Waltz d'Hethert"		0:52
2.	"I H8 U"		3:00
3.	"Stupid Prizes"	Richmond; Percy Faith	3:11
4.	"Take It"		3:24
5.	"Be Quiet!!!"		2:49
6.	"Think About It/What U Think?"		3:26
7.	"K.I.S.S."	Richmond; Scott Storch	1:20
8.	"Make Good"		3:44
9.	"This Time" (featuring Rahrah Gabor)	Richmond; Rahrah Gabor	2:59
10.	"Lateeee"		2:41
11.	"Get Close 2 Me"		3:11
12.	"Fire Sign Oath"		1:42
13.	"Motions"		2:20
14.	"Motions (Reprise)"		0:36
15.	"Break It"		3:36
16.	"Thirsty"		1:18
17.	"Devotions"		4:34
18.	"Nobody Show"		2:40
19.	"Until We Meet Again"		5:04
Total length:			52:28

Notes

- All track titles are stylized in all lowercase.
- "Stupid Prizes" contains a sample from "Brian's Song" by Percy Faith & His Orchestra.
- "K.I.S.S." contains a sample from "U Make Me Wanna" by Jadakiss featuring Mariah Carey.

== Personnel ==
Credits adapted from liner notes.

- KeiyaA – vocals, flute (6), piano (11), saxophone (11), recording (1–6, 8, 10–16, 19), production (3–14, 16–18), executive production, creative direction
- DJ Cowriiie – production (1, 2, 15, 19)
- Leon Kelly – recording (7, 9, 17, 18)
- Rahrah Gabor – vocals (9)
- Gabriel Schuman – mixing, mastering
- Texas Maragh – art direction, design
- Caroline Waxse – art direction
- Avion Pearce – photography
- Caity Arthur – center label image
