= Lakecia Benjamin =

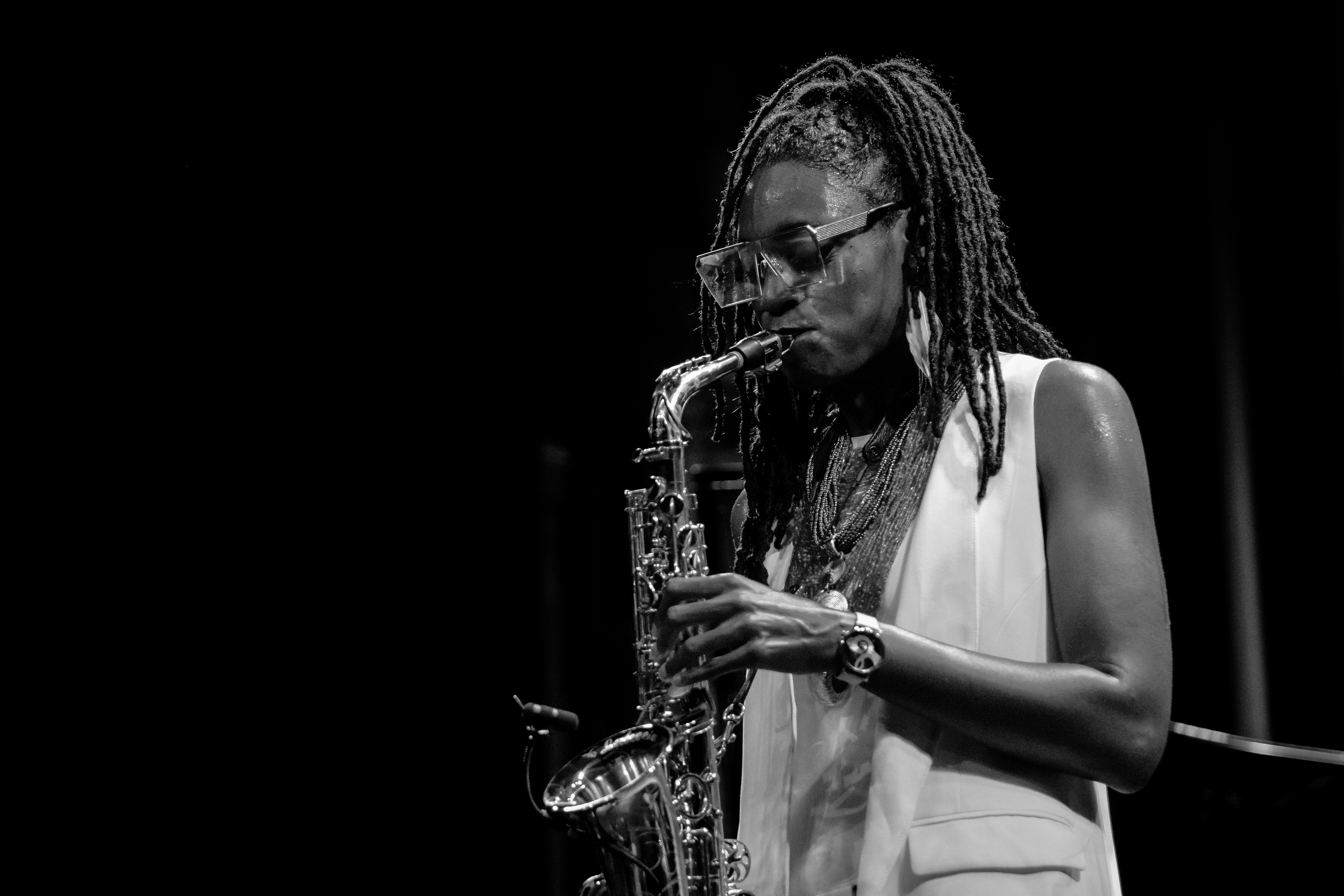
- Benjamin in 2022

Background information
- Born: New York City, New York, U.S.
- Genres: Jazz, funk, R&B
- Occupation: Musician
- Instrument: Alto saxophone
- Labels: Motéma, Ropeadope Records, Whirlwind
- Website: www.lakeciabenjamin.com

Lakecia Benjamin is an American jazz, funk, and R&B saxophonist.

Benjamin was born and raised in New York City. She grew up in a Dominican neighborhood in Washington Heights, Manhattan and played merengue, salsa, and Latin music.

As a touring musician she has performed with Missy Elliott and Alicia Keys. She has performed on four continents, for President Barack Obama's 2009 Inauguration, and with Clark Terry, Reggie Workman, Rashied Ali, the David Murray Big Band, Vanessa Rubin, and James Blood Ulmer. She started the band Soul Squad to showcase her compositions.

== Early life ==
Benjamin was born and raised in Washington Heights, a neighborhood in New York City. In grade school, she studied recorder. She attended Eleanor Roosevelt Junior High School in New York City. She has been writing songs and lyrics since the age of 13. She began playing the saxophone in elementary school. Later while attending Fiorello H. LaGuardia High School for the Performing Arts she became interested in jazz. After high school she attended The New School in New York City.

Her beginnings in music were Latin dance music. She played salsa and merengue.

== Career ==
Saxophonist Gary Bartz was an early mentor who introduced her to training technical exercise techniques such as Hyacinthe Klosé’s 25 Daily Etudes. He introduced her to the music of jazz saxophonists Charlie Parker, John Coltrane, and Jackie McLean. While at the New School University, she studied under Billy Harper, Reggie Workman, Buster Williams, Joe Chambers, and Gary Bartz.

Benjamin's first job was with trumpeter Clark Terry in a band that he started called Young Titans of Jazz. She has performed with Anita Baker, Count Basie Orchestra, Harry Belafonte, Blitz the Ambassador, Joanne Brackeen, Keyshia Cole, Duke Ellington Orchestra, Corte Ellis, Kool & the Gang, Macy Gray, Jimmy Heath, Vincent Herring, Bertha Hope, Ulysses Owens Jr., Charlie Persip, The Roots, Santigold, Charles Tolliver, Charenee Wade, Stevie Wonder, Gregory Porter and Craig Robinson's Nasty Delicious Band.

Benjamin's band tours performing music from her debut album, Retox. The album includes Krystle Warren, Amp Fiddler, Maya Azucena, Melanie Charles, ChinahBlac, and Mavis Swann Poole. The album was co-produced by Ben Kane.

Benjamin was nominated for the 2026 Grammy Award for Best Jazz Performance for her song Noble Rise.

== Personal life ==
In September 2021, Benjamin was involved in a single-car accident leading to multiple injuries, including a broken jaw.

== Discography ==
=== As leader ===
- Retox (Motéma, 2012)
- Rise Up (Ropeadope, 2018)
- Pursuance: The Coltranes (Ropeadope, 2020)
- Phoenix (Whirlwind, 2023)
- Phoenix Reimagined (Live) (Ropeadope, 2024)
- We Dream (Artwork, 2026)

=== As guest ===
- Georgia Anne Muldrow, Mama, You Can Bet! (SomeOthaShip, 2020)
