= War (Drake song) =

2020 song by Drake

Song by Drake

from the album Dark Lane Demo Tapes
- Released: December 24, 2019
- Genre: UK drill
- Length: 3:00
- Label: OVO; Republic
- Songwriters: Aubrey Graham; Manalla Yusuf
- Producer: Axl

Music video
- "War" on YouTube

"War" is a song by Canadian rapper Drake from his commercial mixtape Dark Lane Demo Tapes (2020). It was released on December 24, 2019, through Republic and OVO.

== Background and promotion ==
The song was released on December 24, 2019, as part of Oliver El-Khatib's El-Kuumba Tape Vol. 1 SoundCloud mixtape. El-Khatib is Drake's manager, as well as the co-founder of OVO Sound. The project served as a collaboration with Kuumba International, a Japanese retailer which sells incense, candles, and clothing. Writing about his intention behind "War", Drake commented "Just wanna say this for my city Toronto in regards to the song 'War'. My goal is to always uplift and show love to rappers that are buzzing and gaining the world's attention." The track was then included on Drake's Dark Lane Demo Tapes commercial mixtape, released on May 1, 2020.

== Production ==
The song was produced by London-based producer Axl. Speaking with Complex about the beat for "War", AXL commented that it "sounds like mid-trap and mid-drill. It doesn't sound like a regular aggressive drill beat. It's more calm. It's a soft tempo drill beat. I think that's Drake's vibe, and it clicks with him." The song contains a blend of synths and percussion.

== Composition and lyrics ==
The track was described by Drake as a freestyle. Although a UK drill song, The Fader described the song as "grime-influenced". Time wrote that in addition to fellow Dark Lane Demo Tapes track "Demons", "War" was "splatter[ed] [...] with borrowed flows and British lingo." Billboard also noted that Drake employed a British accent for the song.

Lacking a hook, the song is performed in one verse. The lyrics on "War" seemingly addressed Drake's feud with Canadian singer the Weeknd, particularly that the two had gotten past their conflict, although the latter was not directly named. Additionally, Drake touches on betrayals, romantic relationships, and his gripes with social media.

== Critical reception ==
Jon Caramanica of The New York Times described "War" as "the sort of in-between-hits song that's become almost as much a Drake stock-in-trade as the hits themselves." Caramanica opined that AXL Beats' production was "full of mellow menace." Similarly, Jon Blistein of Rolling Stone noted that the song's synth and percussion blend was "low-key" but "still wields a sinister edge." Craig Jenkins of Vulture wrote negatively of the track following the release of Dark Lane Demo Tapes stating that "War" "has the same problem it did in December, which is to say that the U.K. drill cut leans too far into the roadman accent that caught (too much) flak on his last mixtape, 2017's underrated More Life."

Shortly after the song's release, many American hip-hop fans were noted by Uproxx to "declare grime rapper Skepta the latest victim of Drake's perceived 'culture vulture' tendencies." However, British hip-hop fans were critical of those making this assessment, pointing out that "War" is a UK drill song, rather than a grime one. Touching on the song's reception by social media users, Andrew Chow and Cady Lang of Time wrote that "while the songs ["War" and "Demons"] have been met with some mockery online, they've also racked up millions of streams and reinforced [Drake's] ability to absorb hip-hop's vanguard."

== Music video ==
The accompanying music video was released on Drake's official YouTube channel, on December 24, 2019. It was directed by Theo Skudra, a frequent collaborator of Drake's. Employing a snowy ambiance, the video features Drake "decked out in a cozy Canada Goose jacket, out on the ski slopes at night with his friends." The video was partially filmed on location at Blue Mountain Resort in Ontario. The video's editing included utilizing a "fluorescent blue tint."

Originally, the music video included an appearance by Marcella Zoia, nicknamed in the media as "Chair Girl". Although the then-20-year-old Zoia was used in the video as an extra, her appearance drew controversy due a February incident earlier in the year, in which she was recorded throwing patio furniture off the balcony of a Toronto condo onto the Gardiner Expressway below. After receiving backlash on social media, she stated the video was made as a joke; nonetheless, she was arrested and pleaded guilty to mischief endangering life. Shortly after the video's release, radio hosts and many of Drake's fans demanded Zoia's removal from the music video. Meanwhile, Zoia posted some behind-the-scenes shots from the shoot on Instagram. Skudra and Drake issued Instagram posts addressing Zoia's appearance; while linking to a new version with her removed, Skudra stated, "Certain people we don't condone." In addition, Drake stated, "I don't choose the extras for my video by the way." Zoia's Instagram post featuring behind-the-scenes shots from the video shoot was also removed.

== Credits and personnel ==
Credits adapted from Tidal.

- Aubrey Graham – vocals, songwriter, composer
- Manalla Yusuf - songwriter, composer
- Axl Beats – production
- Noel Cadastre – mixer, recording engineer
- Chris Athens – mastering engineer

== Charts ==
Chart (2020)	Peak position
Canada Hot 100 (Billboard)	34
France (SNEP)	121
Portugal (AFP)	129
UK Audio Streaming (OCC)	53
US Billboard Hot 100	52
US Hot R&B/Hip-Hop Songs (Billboard)	27
US Rolling Stone Top 100	26
