= Pain 1993 =

2020 song by Drake featuring Playboi Carti

Song by Drake featuring Playboi Carti

from the album Dark Lane Demo Tapes
- Released: May 1, 2020
- Recorded: 2019–2020
- Genre: Hip-hop
- Length: 2:29
- Label: OVO; Republic
- Songwriters: Aubrey Graham; Jordan Carter; Jordan Jenks
- Producer: Pi'erre Bourne

"Pain 1993" is a song by Canadian rapper Drake featuring American rapper Playboi Carti. It was released as the tenth track from Drake's fifth mixtape Dark Lane Demo Tapes, on May 1, 2020. The song was written by Drake and Playboi Carti, alongside American record producer Pi'erre Bourne.

The song debuted at number 7 on the US Billboard Hot 100, becoming Drake's 38th Hot 100 top 10, matching Madonna for the most in the chart's history. For Playboi Carti, it became his first top 10 entry, beating the number 29 peak of 2017's "Magnolia".

== Background ==
In early April 2020, Drake teased a collaboration with Playboi Carti during an Instagram live session, sharing a snippet of the track and its title. The song is a tribute to fashion designer Ian Connor, who was the manager of Playboi Carti and had previously worked with hip hop artists ASAP Rocky and Kanye West. Connor himself first teased the track in June 2019. "Pain 1993" marks Drake and Carti's first collaboration.

== Critical reception ==
HotNewHipHop noticed Drake "brings his usual effortless delivery," while Playboi Carti "introduces his baby-voiced madness to a wider array of hip-hop and pop fans." In Pitchfork, Matthew Strauss deemed it the "stand out track" on the mixtape, and noticed it "offers a beat that glimmers like sheet metal." Strauss stated Carti "hypes Drake for the new song's first half... Then, when it's [his] turn, he doesn't upstage Drake so much," concluding "Drake and Carti blend their styles while still bouncing off each other, creating a hybrid that's distinct but new."

== Commercial performance ==
The song debuted at number 7 on the US Billboard Hot 100, becoming Drake's 38th Hot 100 top 10, matching Madonna for the most in the chart's history. For Playboi Carti, it became his first top 10 entry, besting the number 29 peak of 2017's "Magnolia".

== Charts ==
Chart (2020)	Peak position
Austria (Ö3 Austria Top 40)	47
Belgium (Ultratip Bubbling Under Flanders)	29
Belgium Urban (Ultratop Flanders)	27
Canada Hot 100 (Billboard)	7
Czech Republic Singles Digital (ČNS IFPI)	90
France (SNEP)	50
Hungary (Stream Top 40)	38
Iceland (Tónlistinn)	22
Ireland (IRMA)	15
Italy (FIMI)	62
Lithuania (AGATA)	12
Netherlands (Single Top 100)	50
New Zealand (Recorded Music NZ)	17
Portugal (AFP)	30
Slovakia Singles Digital (ČNS IFPI)	58
Sweden (Sverigetopplistan)	69
Switzerland (Schweizer Hitparade)	22
UK Singles (Official Charts)	17
US Billboard Hot 100	7
US Hot R&B/Hip-Hop Songs (Billboard)	6
US Rolling Stone Top 100	4

== Certifications ==
Region	Certification	Certified units/sales
Australia (ARIA)	Gold	35,000^{‡}
New Zealand (RMNZ)	Gold	15,000^{‡}
United Kingdom (BPI)	Silver	200,000^{‡}
^{‡} Sales+streaming figures based on certification alone.
