= APRE (band) =

English alternative pop duo

- Origin: Kent, England
- Genre: Alternative pop
- Years active: 2018–present
- Labels: Beach 91; Polydor
- Members: Charlie Brown; Jules Konieczny

APRE are an English alternative pop duo formed in Kent in 2018, comprising two members: Charlie Brown, and Jules Konieczny. Their debut single ("All Yours") was released on 10 April 2018, followed by their debut EP (The Movement of Time) on 25 May 2018. Upon its release, "All Yours" hit number-one on Hype Machine.

== Background ==
APRE comprises two members: Charlie Brown, and Jules Konieczny. Brown and Konieczny met at Ealing Chess Club, where the owner used to let them use the back-room to rehearse and record music. Both studied BA Creative Musicianship at The Institute of Contemporary Music Performance in London.

== Career ==
Their debut single, "All Yours", was released on 10 April 2018 through their own label Beach 91; named after a sign on Ealing Chess Club's garden shed. This was succeeded by the release of "Don't You Feel Like Heaven?" on 24 May 2018; both of which then appeared on their debut EP (The Movement of Time) released on 25 May 2018. Their second EP, Drum Machines Killed Music, was released on 14 September 2018; featuring the singles "Without Your Love" and "Everybody Loves You". The band released their first single with Polydor, "Backstreet", on 16 October 2018. Preceded by the release of "Gap Year 2008" on 7 February 2019, their third EP - Everyone's Commute - was released on 29 March 2019. A 12" vinyl containing tracks from their three EPs to date (The Movement of Time, Drum Machines Killed Music, and Everyone's Commute) was released on 13 April 2019 as part of Record Store Day 2019.

== Discography ==
=== Studio albums ===
Title	Details
Always In My Head	Release: 6 November 2020; Label: Beach 91, Polydor; Format: Digital download

=== Mixtapes ===
Title	Details
A001	Release: 1 March 2022; Label: Beach 91, Polydor; Format: Digital download

=== Extended plays ===
Title	Details
The Movement of Time	Release: 25 May 2018; Label: Beach 91; Format: Digital download
Drum Machines Killed Music	Release: 14 September 2018; Label: Beach 91; Format: Digital download
Everyone's Commute	Release: 29 March 2019; Label: Beach 91, Polydor; Format: Digital download
2.45	Release: 13 April 2019; Label: Beach 91, Polydor; Format: 12" vinyl
The Guns Down EP	Release: 5 November 2019; Label: Beach 91, Polydor; Format: Digital download

=== Singles ===
Title	Year	Album
"All Yours"	2018	The Movement of Time
"Don't You Feel Like Heaven?"	2018	The Movement of Time
"Without Your Love"	2018	Drum Machines Killed Music
"Everybody Loves You"	2018	Drum Machines Killed Music
"Backstreet"	2018	Everyone's Commute
"Gap Year 2008"	2019	Everyone's Commute
"Come Down"	2019	The Guns Down EP
"5 to 5"	2019	The Guns Down EP
"Christmas Trees In Rain"	2019	Non-album singles
"Your Heart's Like a Jungle"	2020	Non-album singles
"Go Somewhere"	2020	Non-album singles
"Live It Up"	2020	Always In My Head
"Without Your Love" (re-issue)	2020	Always In My Head
"My Night" (with Claptone)	2021	Non-album single
"All Mine"	2021	A001
"You"	2021	A001
"Waste My Time"	2021	A001
"Your Eyes"	2021	A001
"Feel It"	2022	A001
"I Don't Love You"	2022	A001
"Submarine"	2022	Non-album singles
"Friday"	2022	Non-album singles
"This City Reminds Me of You"	2022	Non-album singles
"Dancing On the Moon"	2023	TBA
"Is This the Real World?"	2024	TBA
"No Sympathy"	2024	TBA
"When You Love Someone"	2024	TBA

== Awards and nominations ==
Year	Organization	Award	Work	Result
2018	Radio X	Great X-Pectations 2019	Themselves	Included
2018	Too Many Blogs	Ones to Watch 2019	Themselves	Included
2018	Born Music	Ones to Watch 2019	Themselves	Included

== Tours ==
Date	City	Country	Venue	Notes
2018
10/4/2018	London	United Kingdom	Jazz Café	Supporting HER
23/4/2018	London	United Kingdom	Hoxton Square Bar & Kitchen	
5/5/2018	Leeds	United Kingdom	Live At Leeds Festival	
6/5/2018	London	United Kingdom	Notting Hill Arts Club	
17/5/2018	Brighton	United Kingdom	Beach Venue Brighton	Performer at Great Escape Festival
7/7/2018	Gloucester	United Kingdom	Over Farm	Performer at Barn on the Farm Festival
2019
25/2/2019	Oxford	United Kingdom	O2 Academy	Supporting Sea Girls
26/2/2019	Birmingham	United Kingdom	Hare & Hounds	Supporting Sea Girls
27/2/2019	Edinburgh	United Kingdom	Mash House	Supporting Sea Girls
28/2/2019	Newcastle	United Kingdom	Northumbria Institute 2	Supporting Sea Girls
1/3/2019	Leeds	United Kingdom	Key Club	Supporting Sea Girls
5/3/2019	Manchester	United Kingdom	Gorilla	Supporting Sea Girls
6/3/2019	Cardiff	United Kingdom	Clwb Ifor Bach	Supporting Sea Girls
7/3/2019	Portsmouth	United Kingdom	Wedgewood Rooms	Supporting Sea Girls
8/3/2019	London	United Kingdom	Heaven	Supporting Sea Girls
31/3/2019	Bristol	United Kingdom	The Louisiana	
1/4/2019	Manchester	United Kingdom	Jimmy's	
2/4/2019	Birmingham	United Kingdom	Hare & Hounds 2	
2/4/2019	London	United Kingdom	Omeara	
25/9/2019	Cardiff	United Kingdom	Ifor Bach	
26/9/2019	Nottingham	United Kingdom	Bodega	
27/9/2019	Leicester	United Kingdom	The Cookie	
28/9/2019	Sheffield	United Kingdom	Record Junkee	
29/9/2019	York	United Kingdom	The Fulford Arms	
1/10/2019	Leeds	United Kingdom	Hyde Park Book Club	
2/10/2019	Birmingham	United Kingdom	The Sunflower Lounge	
3/10/2019	Manchester	United Kingdom	Deaf Institute	
4/10/2019	Oxford	United Kingdom	The Bullingdon	
5/10/2019	Brighton	United Kingdom	Green Door Store	
7/10/2019	London	United Kingdom	Scala	
8/10/2019	Bristol	United Kingdom	Louisiana	
10/10/2019	Newcastle	United Kingdom	Think Tank	
11/10/2019	Liverpool	United Kingdom	EBGBS	
12/10/2019	Glasgow	United Kingdom	Tenement Trail	
