= Gerson King Combo =

Brazilian singer-songwriter (1943–2020)

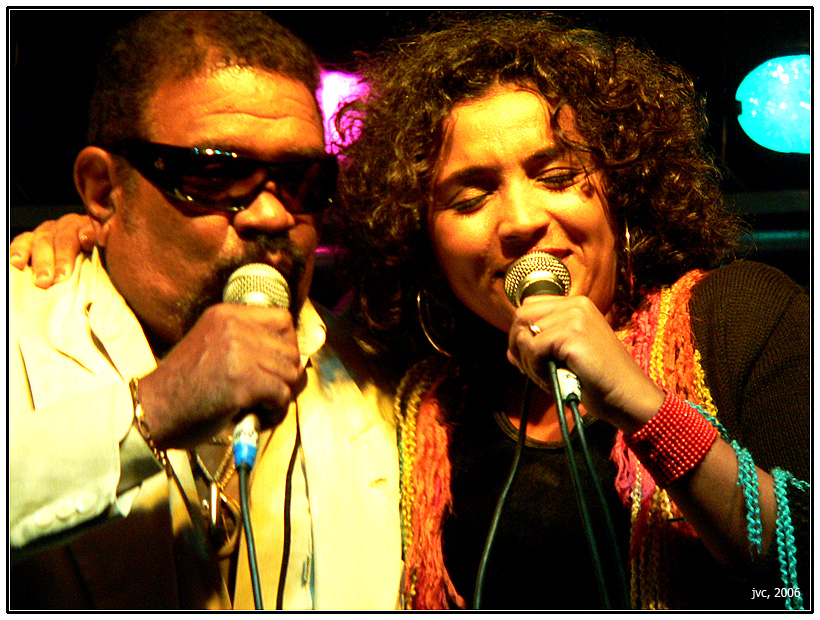
Gerson King Combo and Bárbara Lau (RJ) in 2006

Gérson Rodrigues Côrtes, known as Gerson King Combo (30 November 1943 – 22 September 2020) was a Brazilian soul and funk singer-songwriter.

Born in Rio de Janeiro, he began his career performing on the variety program Hoje é Dia de Rock. He founded and performed in the 1960s musical group Formula 7. He was also a key person in the 1970s counterculture movement Black Rio.

In the mid-1970s, with the growth of the dance club scene in the Rio suburbs, the Black Rio movement gained national notoriety and, with the interest of the record companies in the new sound, Gérson managed to record his two most successful records - Gerson King Combo, 1977, and Gerson King Combo - Volume II, 1978 - achieving radio and dance club hits with "Mandamentos Black", "God Save the King", "Funk Brother Soul" and "Good Bye". As the movement waned, Gérson abandoned his artistic career and began working as an event producer. He was rediscovered in the late 1990s and began to perform and record again, releasing two more albums. He is considered one of the main names in Black Brazilian music, along with Tim Maia, Hyldon and Cassiano.

Côrtes died on 22 September 2020 in Rio de Janeiro from diabetes-related problems, aged 76.
