= Cezinando =

Norwegian singer and rapper (born 1995)

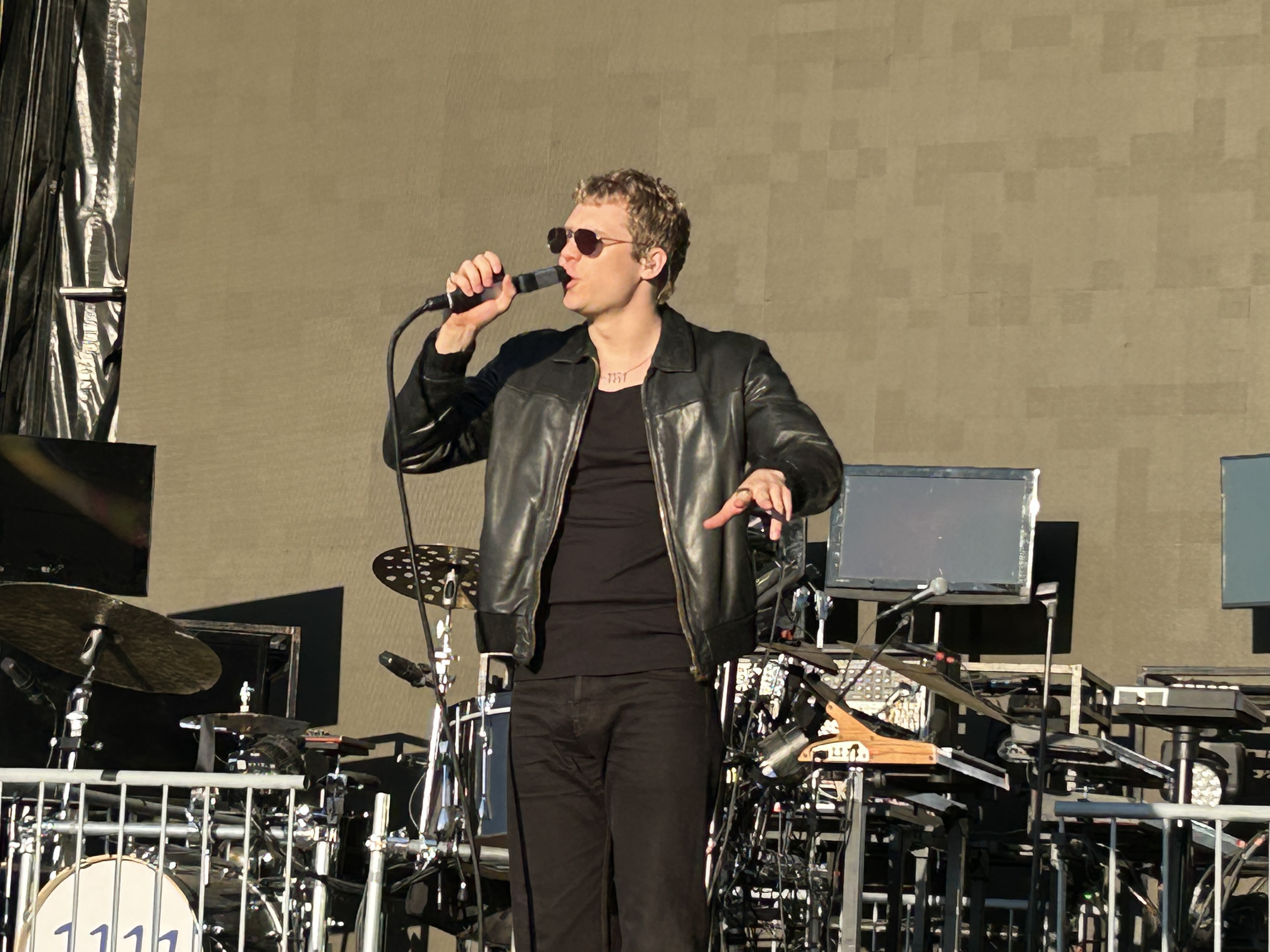
- Cezinando performing in 2025
- Born: Kristoffer Cezinando Karlsen; August 3, 1995 (age 31); Oslo, Norway
- Occupations: Rapper; singer; songwriter
- Musical career
- Genres: Hip hop; rock; pop
- Instrument: Vocals
- Years active: 2012–present
- Label: Universal Music Norway

Kristoffer Cezinando Karlsen (born August 3, 1995 in Oslo), known professionally as Cezinando, is a Norwegian singer, rapper, and songwriter. He has a Norwegian mother and a Portuguese father, and spent a part of his childhood in Lisbon. He has won two P3 Gold awards for his work. His album Noen ganger og andre (Some times and others) was the best selling Norwegian-language album of 2017 in Norway. It was nominated for IMPALA's European Album of the Year Award.

== Discography ==
Albums

- Cez 4 Prez (2012)
- framtid:sanntid (2014)
- Barn av Europa (2016)
- Noen ganger og andre (2017)
- Et godt stup i et grunt vann (2020)
- Sprengkulde (2023)
- Sinekyre 3 (2025)

EPs

- Cez 4 Prez (2012)
- Samtidig (2022)
- EP 1 (2026)

Singles

- "Destillert Ignoranse" (2013)
- "Jollygood 2014" (2013)
- "Nøkkelknippe" (2013)
- "Multiskitzo" (2014)
- "Sykt Jævla kult" (2015)
- "Gud" (2015)
- "€PA" (2015)
- "Blinkesko/Video/" (2016)
- "Botanisk Hage" (2016)
- "Håper du har plass" (2017)
- "Vi er perfekt men verden er ikke det" (2017)
- "Ingen lager helvete som vi" (2018)
