= Songs in the Key of Love =

Studio album by Berita
- Released: February 28, 2020
- Recorded: January 2019
- Genre: Afro pop
- Length: 54:00
- Language: Xhosa; Zulu; English
- Label: Assali Music

Berita chronology
Berita (2017)	Songs in the Key of Love (2020)

Singles from Songs in the Key of Love
- 1. "Ndicel'ikiss" Released: January 25, 2019; 2. "Jikizinto" Released: February 13, 2020

Songs in the Key of Love is the fourth studio album by Zimbabwean-born singer Berita. It was released on 28 February 2020 through Assali Music It features guest appearances from fellow South African artists including Amanda Black, Bekezela, Bongani Sax and Mi Casa trumpeter Mo T. The 13-track album was nominated at the 2021 Zimbabwe Music Awards Best Rnb/Soul album as well as Best Album Of The Year and at the 27th edition of the South African Music Awards.

== Background ==
The album's title was inspired by American singer Stevie Wonder's 1976 offering, Songs in the Key of Life. The album consist of songs about love, hope, endearment, and romance. Berita explaining the album:

I believe in love and in this day and age, the divorce rate has gotten so high that people don't believe in love anymore. I want people to be inspired to believe and seek true love within themselves and their loved ones through this album.

== Singles ==
The song "Ndicel'ikiss" was released on January 25, 2019 and written in December 2018. The single peaked at #21 on the radio monitor RAMS charts, under her independent label Assali Music. The song's title translates to "May I have a kiss?." The music video was released on 4 April 2019 and was shot in her hometown, Bulawayo, after her homecoming show there.

On 13 February 2020, Berita released the album's second single, "Jikizinto", which when loosely translated means "things will turn around eventually". The single topped the charts and peaked #11 on the South Africa RAMS (Radio Audience Measurement) chart with 22-million impressions between February 14 and 20. The music video for the song was later released on 6 August 2020 and was shot on the green screen under strict adherence to the level 3 lockdown regulations. Commenting on the video, Berita said:

This song holds a special place in my heart. We shot this during the lockdown and had so much fun with it. I really hope it can brighten up your day, even if just for a little bit.

The thirteenth song, "Siyathandana" featured South African singer Amanda Black. The music video was released on 25 September 2020 and themed around celebrating love in romantic, family and friendship settings. It featured appearances from South African personalities Somizi Mhlongo, Mohale, Dineo, Ntando Duma and legendary Maskandi artist Ihashi Elimhlophe.

The music video for the opening song "Ndikhawulele" which means "Meet Me Halfway" was released on 12 February 2021.

== Track listing ==
Songs in The Key of Love
No.	Title	Length
1.	"Ndikhawulele"	4:30
2.	"Jikizinto"	4:16
3.	"Ndicel'ikiss"	3:42
4.	"Makoti"	5:04
5.	"Zanemvula"	3:54
6.	"Ndzakurhandza"	4:18
7.	"Makhumalo" (featuring Bekezela)	3:37
8.	"Blind Folded"	4:03
9.	"Dance in the Rain" (featuring Mo T)	3:48
10.	"Yours"	3:35
11.	"Geleza" (featuring Bongani Sax)	4:57
12.	"Apple of My Eye"	3:54
13.	"Siyathandana" (featuring Amanda Black)	4:30
Total length:		54:00

== Release history ==
List of release dates, showing region, formats, label, editions and reference
Region	Date	Format(s)	Label	Edition(s)	Ref.
Various	28 February 2020	CD; digital download; streaming	Assali Music	Standard	

== Accolades ==
Awards and nominations for Songs in The Key of Love
Year	Ceremony	Category	Result	Ref.
2021	Zimbabwe Music Awards	Best Album of the Year	Nominated	
2021	South African Music Awards	Rest of Africa Artist	Won	
