= Dark Lane Demo Tapes =

Mixtape by Drake
- Released: May 1, 2020
- Recorded: 2017 – 2020
- Genres: Hip-hop; R&B
- Length: 49:55
- Labels: OVO; Republic
- Producers: 40; AJ Costly; Axl; Cardo; D. Hill; Salman Balayah; Elyas; Foreign Teck; JB Made It; June James; MexikoDro; Noel Cadastre; Oz; Pi'erre Bourne; Plain Pat; Roxx; Sevn Thomas; Southside

Drake chronology
Care Package (2019)	Dark Lane Demo Tapes (2020)	Scary Hours 2 (2021)

Singles from Dark Lane Demo Tapes
- 1. "Chicago Freestyle" Released: March 1, 2020; 2. "Toosie Slide" Released: April 3, 2020

Dark Lane Demo Tapes is the sixth mixtape by Canadian rapper Drake. The mixtape is a compilation of songs that were released on SoundCloud or leaked on the internet, as well as new songs, and is considered a "warm-up" to Drake's sixth studio album Certified Lover Boy (2021). It was released on May 1, 2020, by OVO Sound and Republic Records. Production was handled by 40, Cardo, Pierre Bourne and Southside, among others. Featured guest appearances include Future, Young Thug, Chris Brown, Playboi Carti, Giveon, Fivio Foreign, and Sosa Geek.

Dark Lane Demo Tapes sees Drake moving away from his "hitmaking formula" to more experimentation, with common producers on his previous records being absent on the mixtape. with its production taking influence from lo-fi, UK drill, trap, SoundCloud rap, R&B and soul, the mixtape is noted for not being as cohesive as Drake's previous records. Rooted in dark, ambient sounds through prominent use of unpolished synths, themes on the mixtape include failed relationships, complicated relationships with friends, and braggadocio surrounding Drake's prominence in the music industry.

The mixtape was supported by the single "Toosie Slide", which debuted at number one on the US Billboard Hot 100 chart, making Drake the first male artist to accomplish three number-one debuts on the chart. All 13 of the mixtape's other songs entered the chart, including the highly anticipated "Pain 1993", which debuted at number seven on the chart, making Drake the tied record holder (with American singer Madonna) for the most top 10 hits on the Billboard Hot 100 with 38.

Dark Lane Demo Tapes was met with generally favorable reviews, with critics praising it for having a more diverse, experimental array of genres and hazy production compared to Drake's most recent records, but criticizing some of its lyrical content as being weak. It debuted at number two on the Billboard 200, with 223,000 album-equivalent units, and became Drake's third record to top the UK Albums Chart. It also topped the charts in Australia, Canada, Estonia, the Netherlands, Ireland, Lithuania and New Zealand.

== Background ==
On April 30, Drake announced the release of the mixtape via social media, also announcing his sixth studio album is scheduled to be released in the summer of 2020. The mixtape is a compilation of songs that were released on SoundCloud or leaked on the internet, as well as new songs.

Reflecting on the ongoing COVID-19 pandemic, Drake said that "It's an interesting time for us all, as musicians, to figure out how this works and what people need, and I just felt like people would appreciate maybe a body of something to listen to, as opposed to just one isolated song". Drake also indicated that the type of contemplative songs featured on Dark Lane Demo Tapes will also be on his upcoming studio album, saying, "I've been in a very reflective state, so I'm gonna give you all I have...All the other songs are fun, but this [contemplative songs] is what I love to do the most.

Jessica McKinney of Complex found that the mixtape is not as cohesive as Drake's previous records, but is a "sample platter of what [Drake] has to offer right now". with the mixtape not considered to be cohesive, Erik Skelton of Complex found that it allows Drake to "play around and try things that wouldn't make sense on a proper Drake album". Craig Jenkins of Vulture felt that the gap between Scorpion and Drake's upcoming sixth album resembles the run-up to his 2011 album Take Care: songs considered to be "album material" do make it on the album, but are kept on a non-album record, e.g. his compilation album Care Package (2019) featured songs that did not make it on Take Care, among other projects.

== Promotion ==
Drake released the single "War" on December 24, 2019, with a music video. On January 4, the demo of a collaboration with rapper Future was leaked online. On January 31, the song was officially released on SoundCloud titled "Desires". The released version omitted the intro and one verse from Future, replacing them with a verse and outro from Drake. On February 29, Drake released two more songs: "When to Say When" and "Chicago Freestyle", which had a combined music video. On April 3, 2020, Drake released "Toosie Slide" with a music video. The song and music video feature a dance, which was created with the help of social media influencer Toosie. The song debuted at number one on the Billboard Hot 100, making Drake the first male artist to have three songs debut at number one.

On April 7, 2020, Drake previewed unreleased songs on Instagram Live with OVO Mark, including "Time Flies", "Deep Pockets", "Landed", "Pain 1993", and "Demons". On April 9, 2020, "Deep Pockets" leaked online, the song was originally recorded for Scorpion (2018). A day later, an early, unfinished version of "From Florida with Love" leaked online, featuring only one verse, which was similar in lyrics to the first verse of the officially released version.

== Recording ==
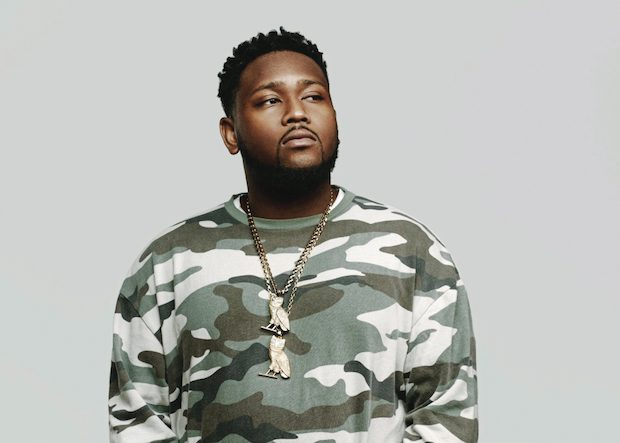
The mixtape is Drake's first major release not to feature producer Boi-1da.

The mixtape sees Drake experimenting and deviating from his usual "hitmaking formula", with common producers on his previous records being absent on the mixtape, such as his frequent collaborator Boi-1da, Murda Beatz and PartyNextDoor. Erik Skelton of Complex noted that Drake takes inspiration from the Soundcloud rap demographic on the mixtape, with prominent producers of the movement featured on the mixtape, including MexikoDro, OZ, and Pi'erre Bourne. American record producer Foreign Teck told Complex in January 2019 that Drake had "about 10 producers" working in a secluded house in Los Angeles for about three weeks. The sessions produced the Drake and Rick Ross duet "Gold Roses", as well as "Losses". According to Foreign Teck, "Gold Roses" set the tone for the sessions:

"In the beginning, [Drake] kind of let us do our thing...And then, I remember the "Gold Roses" beat was made, and [Drake's] like, 'Yo, I need more shit like this'. Once he started hearing the slow beats, very simple, with vocal chops, that caught his ear".

British record producer JB Made It produced "Demons" in January 2020 during recording sessions in New York. Best known for his collaborations with American rapper Playboi Carti, American record producer MexikoDro co-produced "From Florida with Love" in 2017, a plugg music track, with co-production from Drake's longtime collaborator 40. Plain Pat, known for collaborations with American rappers Kanye West and Kid Cudi, co-produced the lo-fi-influenced "Deep Pockets" with 40. Montreal native Roxx co-produced "When to Say When" with June James; the song is Roxx's first production credit. Drake's engineer Noel Cadastre, a member of Drake's OVO crew, produced "Chicago Freestyle" and "Not You Too". with him producing "Toosie Slide", "Time Flies" and co-producing "Losses", Swiss producer OZ is a prominent addition on the mixtape. Atlanta native, record producer D. Hill, who produced American rapper Future's "Life Is Good" — which featured Drake, co-produced "Desires". Southside, one of the originators of the trap wave in Atlanta, produced "D4L" for Future & Young Thug, originally in 2017. Known for Soundcloud rap hits, such as Playboi Carti's "Magnolia" and 6ix9ine's "GUMMO", Pi'erre Bourne produced "Pain 1993". Toronto record producer Sevn Thomas co-produced "Losses"; Thomas previously worked with Drake on the 2016 single "Pop Style". London record producer AXL Beats, who is known for popularizing UK drill beats to Brooklyn, produced "War".

== Themes and production ==
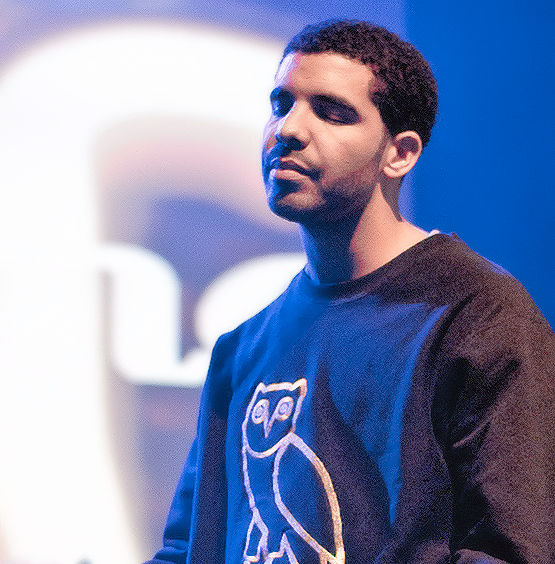
Critics noted that the "gloominess" of Dark Lane Demo Tapes is similar to Drake's second album Take Care (2011).

Dark Lane Demo Tapes sees Drake rapping and singing about topics that have often featured on his previous releases, including failed relationships, complicated relationships with friends, and braggadocio surrounding his prominence and success in the music industry. Writers of Time regarded the lyrics on the mixtape as introspective and not featuring hooks, with them being "surly, withdrawn and clearly indifferent to radio or viral success". The same writers observed that the mixtape has a "wealth of sad boy songs", while Erik Skelton of Complex said that the mixtape features "sleepy, introspective rap songs". Noah Yoo of Pitchfork highlighted the mixtape's lyrics as Drake at "peak paranoia in his relationships, both business and personal". Grant Rindner of Complex found similarities between Dark Lane Demo Tapes and the If You're Reading This It's Too Late (2015) mixtape, as both mixtapes see Drake rapping over "leaner, grittier beats" and focusing more on "traditional bars and delivery than melodies and hooks".

Rapping about his "toxic romantic ways" and love interest, Drake interpolates Eminem's flow from his 2002 single "Superman" on the pre-chorus of "Chicago Freestyle". Drake raps over the beat that borrows the same soul sample as Jay-Z's 2001 single "Song Cry" on "When to Say When". Featuring American singer Chris Brown, "Not You Too" is an R&B song that is led by Drake, while Brown provides "soothing" ad-libs. The mixtape's hit single, "Toosie Slide", was called "strictly a business decision" by Pitchfork due to its dance craze-inspired lyrics aimed for virality on the video-sharing platform TikTok. "D4L", named after the Atlanta hip hop group D4L, sees Drake collaborate with American rappers Young Thug and Future for a trap song. Featuring Playboi Carti, the highly anticipated "Pain 1993" sees Carti and Drake rapping in a high-pitched flow known as the "baby voice". On "From Florida with Love", Drake raps about the value of friendships and growth. On "Demons", a Brooklyn drill influenced song, Drake raps in an urban London accent and makes use of urban UK lingo, which was labelled as "Top Boy–esque" by Aaron Williams of Uproxx. The song features New York drill rappers Fivio Foreign and Sosa Geek. "War" sees Drake use a typical "UK drill flow" over a UK drill beat by AXL Beats. Notably, on the song, Drake narrates the squashing of his feud with Canadian contemporary The Weeknd.

Michael Saponara of Billboard described Dark Lane Demo Tapes as a "doom-and-gloom record", while Max Cea of GQ highlighted the mixtape's "hazy synths" and "dim, ambient beats". Alexis Petridis of The Guardian described the production as a "drizzly electronic haze", and Exclaim!'s Riley Wallace noted that the mixtape is "rooted in the dark, sombre, solo drive through a sleepy city aesthetic". Yoo also recognized the mixtape as "hazier than Drake's most recent albums". Josh Svetz of HipHopDX described the mixtape's tone as "basking in dour ambiance, projecting a setting of drizzling rain cascading from the clouds in the grey sky as vibrating 808s set the tone", while Drake "sounds like he's crooning from the balcony of a high rise loft at 3 a.m., draped in a Versace Baroque bathrobe as he sips on red wine." Referring to the COVID-19 pandemic, Svetz noted that Drake captures the "shared sadness" of the pandemic, and that Dark Lane Demo Tapes is a "fitting soundtrack to the grim reality we all currently live in." Writers of Complex found that the mixtape's cover—Drake wearing a balaclava—is a "dark, moody image that accurately reflects the music found inside [Dark Lane Demo Tapes]."

== Critical reception ==
Professional ratings
Aggregate scores
Source	Rating
AnyDecentMusic?	5.0/10
Metacritic	61/100
Review scores
Source	Rating
AllMusic	3/5 stars
The Guardian	2/5 stars
NME	2/5 stars
Exclaim!	7/10
HipHopDX	3.6/5
Rolling Stone	3/5 stars
Pitchfork	6.8/10

At Metacritic, which assigns a normalized rating out of 100 to reviews from mainstream publications, the album received an average score of 61, based on nine reviews, which indicates "generally favorable reviews". Aggregator AnyDecentMusic? gave it 5.0 out of 10, based on their assessment of the critical consensus.

In a first listen review, Noah Yoo of Pitchfork praised the collaborations on Dark Lane Demo Tapes for being "well-considered and mostly successful", as they complement Drake's emotions, such as "bitter, eccentric, and aggressive". Erik Skelton of Complex highlighted that "Mixtape Drake" is a "very good Drake", and the mixtape is a "very worthwhile listen that satisfies a subset of fans who might be turned off by some of the polish coming from a 2020 Drake studio album". In a review for AllMusic, Tim Sendra stated that while the mixtape is not as "fun or sonically interesting" as Drake's early work, it's a step in a more progressive direction. Sendra concluded that the mixtape is "a solid entry in [Drake's] ever growing catalog." Writing for Exclaim!, Riley Wallace noted that Dark Lane Demo Tapes delivers a "good collection of cuts" and features "some absolute gems", however, it fails to offer anything different from Drake's previous releases. Though Wallace felt that the mixtape is "nothing groundbreaking", she called it a "hit".

Alexis Petridis of The Guardian praised the mixtape for being "occasionally fantastic", specifically "D4L, "Demons" and "War", but criticized "Pain 1993" for being "occasionally hugely irritating". Though Petridis found the mixtape to be "sometimes sounding atmospheric", he also felt that it sounds like a "noncommittal shrug", due to songs on the mixtape not offering enough sonic impression. Petridis summed up Dark Lane Demo Tapes as having "flashes of skill and rawness, [but] feeling like a clumsy lunge at commercial success". In an official review for Pitchfork, Rawiya Kameir hailed the mixtape for having "moments of precise delivery, sticky flows, and hooks primed to be enjoyed in the context of an arena show", but criticized Drake's "teenage boyhood" lyricism directed at women.

In a generally negative review of Dark Lane Demo Tapes, NME's Luke Morgan Britton felt that Drake "failed to learn the lessons" from his previous album, Scorpion, describing the mixtape as a "bloated and unnecessary release, which veers from recycled ideas to outright duds". Though Josh Svetz of HipHopDX called the mixtape a "collection of moody bangers and ballads that show glimpses how Drake can still command the attention of the masses", Svetz criticized the mixtape's "unfocused loosies" as filler tracks that "poison the few good crops [Drake] produces [on the mixtape]". Svetz also criticized "Losses" for being near the tail end of the Dark Lane Demo Tapes, which he described as the most well-written ballad on the mixtape, and an "intro worthy material" song.

== Commercial performance ==
On its first day of release, Dark Lane Demo Tapes occupied the top fourteen positions on the US and Global Apple Music songs chart, and eight of the top 10 positions on the US Spotify songs charts, led by the track "Pain 1993", on all three charts.

In Drake's native Canada, Dark Lane Demo Tapes debuted at number one. In the US, the mixtape debuted at number two on the Billboard 200, with 223,000 equivalent album units, including 19,000 pure sales and 269.1 million streams, marking Drake's 12th consecutive top 10 album. All 14 songs on the mixtape also entered the Billboard Hot 100, the highest-debuting entry being "Pain 1993", which debuted at number seven, making Drake the tied record holder (with Madonna) for the most top 10 hits on the Hot 100. As of December 26, 2020, Dark Lane Demo Tapes was the nineteenth best-selling album of the year according to Hits, moved a total of 1,053,000 album-equivalent units by the end of 2020, including 44,000 pure album sales, 142,000 song sales, 1,298 billion audio-on-demand streams, and 112 million video-on-demand streams.

The mixtape debuted at number one on the UK Albums Chart, earning 20,000 units in its first week. It also topped the charts in Australia, the Netherlands, Ireland, Lithuania and New Zealand.

== Track listing ==
Credits adapted from Tidal and BMI.

No.	Title	Writer(s)	Producer(s)	Length
1.	"Deep Pockets"	Aubrey Graham; Noah Shebib; Patrick Reynolds	40; Plain Pat^{[a]}	3:42
2.	"When to Say When"	Graham; June James; Alonzo Thornhill; Anthony Costley, Jr.; Bobby Glenn; Ralph Johnson	James; Roxx^{[b]}; AJ Costly^{[b]}	3:43
3.	"Chicago Freestyle" (with Giveon)	Graham; Giveon Evans; Rupert Thomas, Jr.; Noel Cadastre; Marshall Mathers; Jeff Bass; Steve King	Cadastre; Sevn Thomas^{[a]}	3:40
4.	"Not You Too" (featuring Chris Brown)	Graham; Christopher Brown; Cadastre	Cadastre	4:29
5.	"Toosie Slide"	Graham; Ozan Yildirim	Oz	4:07
6.	"Desires" (featuring Future)	Graham; Nayvadius Wilburn; Darius Hill	D. Hill; Cadastre^{[a]}	3:57
7.	"Time Flies"	Graham; Yildirim	Oz	3:12
8.	"Landed"	Graham; Ronald LaTour Jr.; Dylan Cleary-Krell	Cardo; Dez Wright	2:32
9.	"D4L" (with Future and Young Thug)	Graham; Wilburn; Jeffery Williams; Joshua Luellen	Southside	3:09
10.	"Pain 1993" (featuring Playboi Carti)	Graham; Jordan Carter; Jordan Jenks	Pi'erre Bourne	2:29
11.	"Losses"	Graham; Yildirim; Thomas; Michael Hernandez; Elias Sticken	OZ; Sevn Thomas; Foreign Teck^{[a]}; Elyas^{[a]}	4:31
12.	"From Florida with Love"	Graham; Cameron Pitts; Shebib	MexikoDro; 40	3:54
13.	"Demons" (featuring Fivio Foreign and Sosa Geek)	Graham; Maxie Ryles III; Jessie Madison; Jonathan Mensah	JB Made It	3:24
14.	"War"	Graham; Manalla Yusuf	Axl	3:00
Total length:				49:55

Notes

- ^{^[a]} signifies a co-producer
- ^{^[b]} signifies an additional producer
- ^{^[c]} signifies an uncredited co-producer
- "Losses" features a recording of Dennis Graham.

Sample credits

- "When to Say When" contains a sample of "Sounds Like a Love Song", written by Bobby Glenn and Ralph Johnson, as performed by Bobby Glenn.
- "Chicago Freestyle" contains an interpolation of "Superman", written by Marshall Mathers, Jeff Bass, and Steve King, as performed by Eminem.
- "From Florida with Love" contains an interpolation of "Lollipop", written by Dwayne Carter, Stephen Garrett, Darius Harrison, Jim Jonsin, Rex Zamor and Marcus Cooper, as performed by Lil Wayne.

== Personnel ==
Credits adapted from Tidal.

Musicians

- Sevn Thomas – piano (track 3)

Technical

- Noah Shebib – recording (tracks 1, 4, 6, 7), mixing (tracks 1, 2, 5, 6)
- Noel Cadastre – mixing (tracks 2, 4, 7–14), recording (tracks 3–14), mixing assistant (track 5)
- Chris Athens – mastering (tracks 1–7, 14)

== Charts ==
=== Weekly charts ===
Chart performance for Dark Lane Demo Tapes
Chart (2020)	Peak position
Australian Albums (ARIA)	1
Austrian Albums (Ö3 Austria)	5
Belgian Albums (Ultratop Flanders)	3
Belgian Albums (Ultratop Wallonia)	3
Canadian Albums (Billboard)	1
Danish Albums (Hitlisten)	3
Dutch Albums (Album Top 100)	1
Estonian Albums (Eesti Ekspress)	1
Finnish Albums (Suomen virallinen lista)	5
French Albums (SNEP)	2
German Albums (Offizielle Top 100)	11
Irish Albums (Official Charts)	1
Italian Albums (FIMI)	4
Lithuanian Albums (AGATA)	1
New Zealand Albums (RMNZ)	1
Norwegian Albums (VG-lista)	2
Portuguese Albums (AFP)	7
Scottish Albums (Official Charts)	31
Swedish Albums (Sverigetopplistan)	2
Swiss Albums (Schweizer Hitparade)	2
UK Albums (Official Charts)	1
US Billboard 200	2
US Top R&B/Hip-Hop Albums (Billboard)	1

=== Year-end charts ===
2020 year-end chart performance for Dark Lane Demo Tapes
Chart (2020)	Position
Australian Albums (ARIA)	90
Belgian Albums (Ultratop Flanders)	113
Canadian Albums (Billboard)	24
Dutch Albums (Album Top 100)	74
French Albums (SNEP)	177
UK Albums (OCC)	75
US Billboard 200	28
US Top R&B/Hip-Hop Albums (Billboard)	13

2021 year-end chart performance for Dark Lane Demo Tapes
Chart (2021)	Position
US Billboard 200	117
US Top R&B/Hip-Hop Albums (Billboard)	74

== Certifications ==
Certifications for Dark Lane Demo Tapes
Region	Certification	Certified units/sales
Australia (ARIA)	Gold	35,000^{‡}
Canada (Music Canada)	2× Platinum	160,000^{‡}
Denmark (IFPI Danmark)	Platinum	20,000^{‡}
France (SNEP)	Gold	50,000^{‡}
Italy (FIMI)	Gold	25,000^{‡}
New Zealand (RMNZ)	2× Platinum	30,000^{‡}
Poland (ZPAV)	Gold	10,000^{‡}
United Kingdom (BPI)	Gold	100,000^{‡}
^{‡} Sales+streaming figures based on certification alone.
