= Forever, Ya Girl =

Studio album by KeiyaA
- Released: March 27, 2020
- Recorded: 2017–2020
- Length: 42:19
- Label: Forever
- Producer: KeiyaA; DJ Blackpower; DJ Cowriiie

KeiyaA chronology
Work (2015)	Forever, Ya Girl (2020)	Hooke's Law (2025)

Forever, Ya Girl is the debut studio album by American singer, multi-instrumentalist, and record producer KeiyaA. It was released on March 27, 2020, through Forever Recordings. It appeared on several year-end lists.

== Background ==
The album was recorded between 2017 and 2020 in New York City and Chicago. The cover artwork was designed by Jefferson Harris, with a photograph taken by Rahim Fortune. Music videos were released for the songs "Negus Poem 1 & 2" and "I! Gits! Weary!".

At the 2021 NPR Tiny Desk (Home) Concert, KeiyaA cited Jayne Cortez and Ntozake Shange as sources of inspiration for the album.

== Release ==
The album was originally self-released as a digital download on March 27, 2020. The cassette edition of the album was released on June 22, 2020. To coincide with the Bandcamp Friday on December 4, 2020, she released three versions of the album: a CD, a cassette, and a print companion called On Returning My Quikest Language Back to My Mouth.

The vinyl edition of the album was released on March 27, 2021. It was re-released on August 9, 2024, through XL Recordings.

== Critical reception ==
Professional ratings
Review scores
Source	Rating
Pitchfork	8.2/10
Spectrum Culture	4.5/5

Claire Lobenfeld of Pitchfork stated, "On her debut album Forever, Ya Girl, the Chicago-bred, New York-based singer/producer/multi-instrumentalist KeiyaA merges Earl Sweatshirt-ish grime and the grit of deconstructed club with hints of psych and funk." Andrew Sacher of BrooklynVegan commented that "Its ingredients — R&B, funk, jazz, psychedelia — are styles of music often associated with groups of musicians who harmonize and improvise with each other, but you can really feel how Forever, Ya Girl is an album by a sole individual who was in her own head while making it."

=== Accolades ===
Year-end lists for Forever, Ya Girl
Publication	List	Rank	Ref.
Clash	Clash Albums of the Year 2020	39	
Complex	The Best Albums of 2020	50	
Crack	The Top 50 Albums of 2020	43	
Esquire	The 50 Best Albums of 2020	15	
The Fader	The 50 Best Albums of 2020	37	
The Guardian	The 50 Best Albums of 2020	32	
Okayplayer	Okayplayer's Best Albums of 2020	7	
Paste	The 50 Best Albums of 2020	44	
Pitchfork	The 50 Best Albums of 2020	22	
Vice	The 100 Best Albums of 2020	26	

== Track listing ==
All tracks are written by KeiyaA.

Forever, Ya Girl track listing
No.	Title	Length
1.	"I Thot There Was One Wound in This House, There's Two"	2:19
2.	"Way Eye"	1:18
3.	"Rectifiya"	3:58
4.	"Hvnli"	3:09
5.	"Hvnli (Reprise)"	1:47
6.	"Do Yourself a Favor"	4:27
7.	"A Mile, a Way"	2:13
8.	"I Want My Things!"	2:21
9.	"Change the Story (Interlude)"	0:21
10.	"Every Nigga Is a Star"	2:37
11.	"I! Gits! Weary!"	2:06
12.	"Negus Poem 1 & 2"	3:39
13.	"Forreal???"	2:38
14.	"F.W.U."	3:00
15.	"Nu World Burdens"	3:24
16.	"Keep It Real"	3:01
Total length:		42:19

== Personnel ==
Credits adapted from liner notes.

- KeiyaA – vocals, production
- DJ Blackpower – additional production (3, 12, 14, 16)
- DJ Cowriiie – additional production (15)
- Bstfrnd – mixing, mastering
- Jefferson Harris – cover design, artwork
- Rahim Fortune – photography
