= Mama, You Can Bet! =

Studio album by Jyoti
- Released: August 28, 2020
- Genre: Jazz
- Length: 44:20
- Label: SomeOthaShip Connect

Professional ratings
Aggregate scores
Source	Rating
Metacritic	84/100
Review scores
Source	Rating
AllMusic	4/5 stars
Exclaim!	8/10
Mojo	4/5 stars
Pitchfork	8.4/10
PopMatters	8/10
Uncut	4/5 stars
The Wire	4/5 stars

Mama, You Can Bet! is a studio album by Georgia Anne Muldrow, her third under the name Jyoti.

== Track listing ==
All tracks are written by Georgia Anne Muldrow.

No.	Title	Length
1.	"Mama, You Can Bet!"	3:11
2.	"Bop for Aneho"	2:04
3.	"Zane, the Scribe"	2:43
4.	"Our Joy (Mercedes)"	1:44
5.	"Ra's Noise (Thukumbado)" (featuring Lakecia Benjamin)	3:22
6.	"Bemoanable Lady Geemix Fonk"	3:33
7.	"Orgone"	3:06
8.	"Skippin and Trippin"	1:12
9.	"Swing, Kirikou, Swing!"	2:08
10.	"Quarry's Queries"	3:06
11.	"Ancestral Duckets"	4:04
12.	"Hard Bap Duke"	2:55
13.	"This Walk"	2:34
14.	"Fabus Foo Geemix"	4:50
15.	"The Cowrie Waltz"	3:55
