= Keiyaa =

American singer-songwriter

KeiyaA
- Born: Chakeiya Camille Richmond; July 28, 1992 (age 33); Chicago, Illinois, U.S.
- Genres: Neo soul
- Occupations: Singer; songwriter; record producer
- Instruments: Vocals; alto sax
- Years active: 2015–present
- Labels: Forever Recordings; XL Recordings

Chakeiya Camille Richmond (born 28 July 1992), known professionally as Keiyaa (stylized as KeiyaA), is an American singer-songwriter, multi-instrumentalist, and a record producer. She independently released her debut album Forever, Ya Girl in 2020.

== Early life and education ==
Chakeiya Camille Richmond was born and raised in Chicago on the city's south side. Her family lived in multiple south side neighborhoods, including Cottage Grove and Englewood. She tested into Chicago Public Schools' magnet program and graduated from Kenwood Academy. During childhood she sang in the Chicago Children's Choir until switching to the alto saxophone in seventh grade. She cited soul artists including Chaka Khan, Patrice Rushen, jazz musicians like John Coltrane and Miles Davis and R&B groups such as SWV as early musical influences. She also finds inspiration in goth and post-punk/alternative rock artists like Nirvana and Siouxsie and the Banshees.

Richmond attended University of Illinois at Chicago and Columbia College to study jazz and play alto sax before leaving due to disillusionment with the program's hierarchical nature, as well difficulty balancing school with working full-time. Shortly after she decided to pursue music professionally.

== Career ==
While still playing and performing on alto sax, she collaborated with Chicago musicians including Noname and Vic Mensa. She decided to switch her focus to solo work producing and singing R&B and electronic music. Performing under the name Keiya, she released her debut EP, Work, in February 2015. It was described as "emotional, sleepy, and yet strikingly optimistic" by These Days magazine. Shortly after its release she moved to New York. She added an additional "A" to her name (KeiyaA) in order to differentiate herself from other performers on streaming sites.

KeiyaA's debut album Forever, Ya Girl was released in March 2020 and self-produced under her personal label Forever Recordings. It was reviewed by Olivia Ovendon for KEXP as featuring "powerful mantra-esque lyrics, and woozy, heady, immersive beats in captivating fashion." Esquire described the sound as "downcast grime and smooth R&B." Pitchfork writer Clare Lobenfeld rated the album an 8.2/10 and praised its "resolute realness that can only happen outside the major label gaze." Forever, Ya Girl was named to Pitchfork, Rolling Stone, and The Guardian's "Best Albums of 2020" lists.

She performed an NPR Tiny Desk concert at her home on February 11, 2021.

Her second album, Hooke's Law, was released on October 31, 2025. It received universal acclaim from critics.

== Personal life ==
As of August 2025, Keiyaa resides in Brooklyn.

== Discography ==
=== Studio albums ===
Title	Album details
Forever, Ya Girl	Released: March 27, 2020; Label: Forever; Format: Digital download, streaming
Hooke's Law	Released: October 31, 2025; Label: XL; Format: Digital download, streaming

=== Extended plays ===
Title	Album details
Work	Released: February 24, 2015; Label: Forever; Format: Digital download, streaming
