= Berita =

Zimbabwean singer

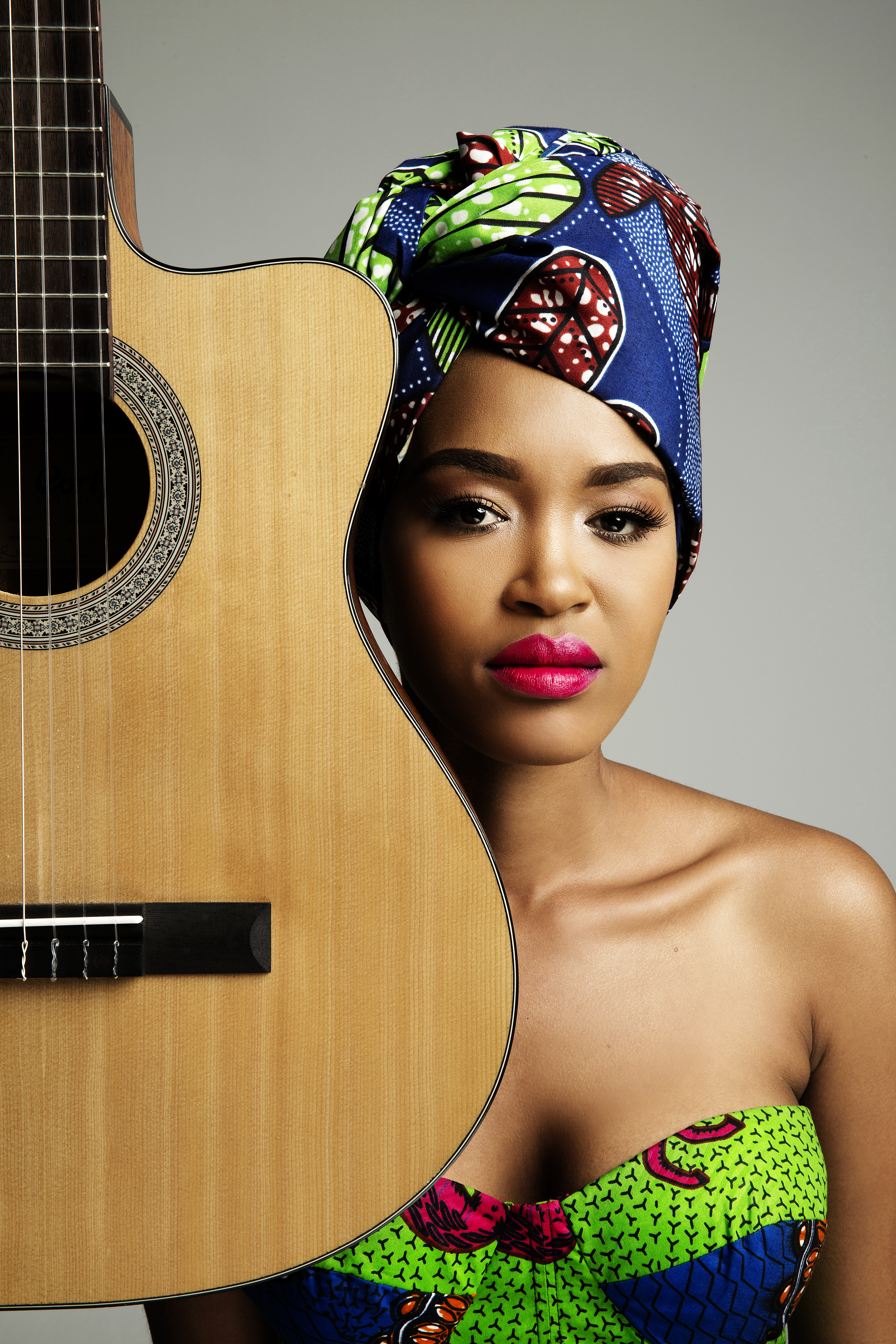
- Berita in 2016.

Background information
- Born: Gugulethu Khumalo; 27 June 1991 (age 34); Bulawayo, Zimbabwe
- Origin: Zimbabwe
- Genres: Afro-soul, Afro pop
- Occupations: singer; songwriter; music producer
- Instrument(s): Vocals, acoustic guitar
- Years active: 2012–present
- Labels: Assali Music
- Website: www.beritaafrosoul.co.za

Gugulethu Khumalo (born 27 June 1991), best known by her stage name Berita, is a Zimbabwean-born singer, songwriter and music producer. Her music is a combination of soul music containing elements from Afro Jazz, contemporary pop influences as well as South African dance music. She is the owner of the independent record label Assali Music. She is also the founder of the Women of Music Business (WOMB), a pan African women empowerment organisation in the music industry.

== Early life and education ==
Berita was born on the 27th of June 1991 in Bulawayo. She is the first born in a family of five. She spent a part of her childhood in Bulawayo and Zhombe where her parents were teachers at Rio Tinto. She attended St Martin de Porres in Zhombe, Nketa Primary school and Greenfield Primary school in Bulawayo. In 2007, she moved to New Zealand with her family in search of greener pastures due to the difficult economic and political climate in Zimbabwe and later moved to South Africa to pursue her tertiary education at Walter Sisulu University in the Eastern Cape.

== Career ==
In 2012, she released her debut album titled Conquering Spirit, which peaked at #1 on iTunes and earned her Gold Status on RISA and won the Best African Pop Album award at the 2013 Metro FM Awards.

In 2014, she collaborated with legendary singers Hugh Masekela and Oliver Mtukudzi on the single, "Mwana Wa Mai". That following year she collaborated with Black Motion on the "Mwana Wa Mai" remix.

In 2016, she participated in Coke Studio which resulted in the release of the single, "Vusu Yeke" which she collaborated with rapper, Yanga Chief.

Her single "Ezizweni" peaked #1 on Metro FM’s Top 40 chart and Ukhozi FM’s Top 20 chart And her debut single titled "Ndicel'ikiss" peaked #21 on the radio monitor RAMS charts, recorded under her independent label ASSALI Music. She collaborated with Mobi Dixon on her single "Ezizweni" and Da Capo on "Found You".

In February 2020, she released her fourth studio album, Songs in the Key of Love. At the 27th annual South African Music Awards, the album received an award for the Rest of Africa Award. The album's leading single "Jikizinto" peaked #1 on the Radio Monitor charts, making her the first female solo independent artist to peak #1 in the new decade. Her previous music release "Ungandibulali" peaked #1 spending 3 weeks at the top on the Radio Monitor Charts, the single featured Ndlovu Youth Choir and was the theme song during the 2020s 16 Days of activism period as part of SABC's 'Do Not Turn A Blind Eye' campaign against GBV. She also collaborated with Amanda Black on the single, "Siyathandana".

In fashion, she has collaborated with local South African designers such as Athenkosi Mgundlwa, KISUA and Rich Factory.

She has performed at music festivals such as the Bayimba International Festival in Uganda, Lake of Stars Festival, Jakaranda Music Festival in Zimbabwe and the Cape Town Jazz Festival as part of Oliver Mtukudzi’s tribute concert.

On 27 May 2021, she was appointed as one of the board members for the Recording Industry of South Africa (RISA).

== Discography ==
- Conquering Spirit (2012)
- Songs of Empowerment (2014)
- Berita (2017)
- Songs in the Key of Love (2020)

== Singles ==
=== As lead artist ===
List of singles as lead artist, with selected chart positions and certifications, showing year released and album name
Title	Year	Peak chart positions	Certifications	Album
Title	Year	ZA	Certifications	Album
"Mwana Wa Mai"	2015	—		Songs Of Empowerment
"Vesu Yeke" (Berita, Yanga)	2016	—		Coke Studio South Africa: Season 2
"Suprises"	2017	—		Berita
"Ndicel'ikiss"	2019	—		Songs in the Key of Love
"Yours"	2020	—		Songs in the Key of Love
"Jikizinto"	2020	—		Songs in the Key of Love
"Siyathandana"	2020	—		Songs in the Key of Love
"Ungandi bulali" (Berita, Ndlovu Youth Choir)	2020	—		Non-album single
"Peace of Mind" (featuring Abidoza, Alie Keys)	2023	—		Non-album single
"Body"	2023	—		Non-album single
"—" denotes a recording that did not chart or was not released in that territory.

== Awards and nominations ==
Year	Award ceremony	Prize	Result
2013	Metro FM Music Awards	Best African pop album	Won
2015	South African Afro Music Awards	Rising Star of the Year	Won
2015	Wawela Music Awards	Songwriter of the Year	Won
2016	Zimbabwe Achievers Awards	Music artist of the Year	Nominated
2016	Eastern Cape Music Awards	Best female	Won
2019	Zimbabwe Achievers Awards	Music artist of the Year	Nominated
2021	Zimbabwe Music Awards	Best RNB & Soul	Nominated
2021	Zimbabwe Music Awards	Best Album of the Year	Nominated
2021	South African Music Awards	Rest of Africa Artist	Won
