= Walkin' Cane Mark =

American musical artist (1967–2020)

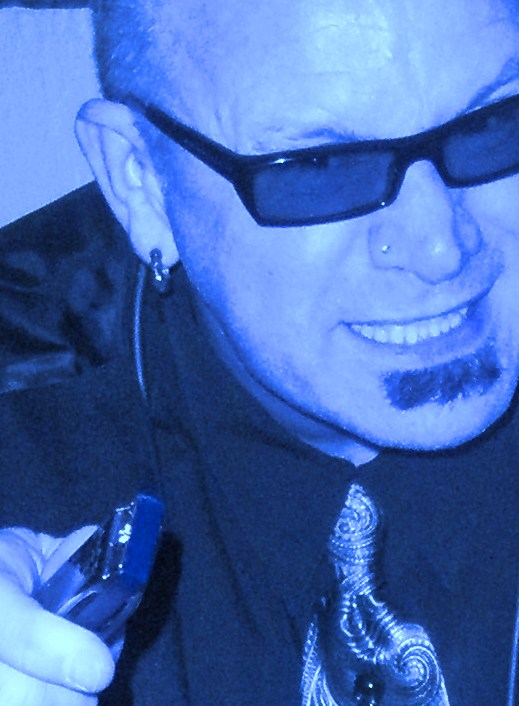
- Walkin' Cane Mark 2013

Background information
- Also known as: Cane, Mark Cane
- Born: August 26, 1967; Phoenix, Arizona, United States
- Origin: Phoenix, Arizona
- Died: June 22, 2020 (aged 52) Phoenix, Arizona, United States
- Genres: Blues, Memphis Soul
- Occupation: Musician
- Instruments: Vocals, harmonica
- Years active: 1989–2020
- Labels: JAEN Records, Enable Records, Grand Blues Music – Chicago
- Website: www.walkincanemark.com

Walkin' Cane Mark (August 26, 1967 – June 21, 2020) was an American blues vocalist, harmonica player and recording artist, based in Phoenix, Arizona, United States.

== Career timeline ==
(1986) Walkin' Cane Mark started singing with Phoenix blues bands at 19 years old.

(1989) Mark started his professional career at the age of 22 fronting blues and r&b band "Cold Shott & The Hurricane Horns", band leader/bass player Ted Kowal wanted a front man that had the live stage presence and wildness of the blue-eyed soul man Wayne Cochran. Ironically this was later also noticed by C.C. Rider alumni and WC Mark was invited as a special guest at two of Wayne Cochran & The CC Riders reunions (2001 & 2003; Hollywood and Miami Florida).

(1994) The start of W C Mark's solo career and the formation of "Walkin' Cane Mark & A Shot In The Dark".

(1995) Mark was signed to the independent record label JAEN Records (usually recording with his touring band at the time).

(1996) the 1996 "No Rest For The Wicked" album and tour featuring ex members of the Parliament Funkadelic (P-Funk) horn section.

(1997–2001) Mark teams up with blues/r&b shouter Nappy Brown for several tours of Europe with "The Nappy Brown/ Walkin' Cane Mark Blues Show".

(2001–2010) Mark performed as a side man (harmonica) and semi-retirement.

(2011) Walkin' Cane Mark was back recording his first album in 11 years, Tryin' To Make You Understand (title song co-written with Junior Wells in 1995).

(2012–2013) The launch of Walkincanemark.com. Cane begins work with new manager Christopher Slattery and roots/blues advocate Betsie Brown on Blind Raccoon.

(2013) "Tryin' To Make You Understand – Remastered" released recording nationally and internationally spending more than four weeks in the number one in the "Classic Blues Chart".

== Origin ==
Willie Dixon dubbed Mark, "Walkin' Cane Mark" in 1988 when he was forced to walk with a cane after an injury. It was also Mr. Dixon who first recognized Mark's passion for blues and soul music. Dixon gave Cane "Gravedigger Blues" for his first CD. Walkin' Cane Mark was taught his first harmonica licks by renowned band leader R.D. Olson, then went on to refine his technique under the tutelage of Chicago musicians Snooky Pryor & Junior Wells. Mark played in a "Mississippi Saxophone" style much like Snooky Pryor, (starting songs with a honking harmonica intro thus directing the backing band in the formation and feel of the song). Mark was also well known for mixing a classic "Memphis Soul" sound with his vocal delivery and larger than life stage presence. He is also known to be one of the youngest players that used older post WWII style of blues (such as Sunny Boy No. 1 & Snooky Pryor) harmonica playing. Walkin' Cane Mark is considered one of the most charismatic live personalities who performed the blues. (Source: "Walkin' Cane Mark's Blues" by Jarrett Hendricks). In 2007, Walkin' Cane Mark had his first son named after his grandfather, Edward and in 2010 had to fraternal twins, Elizabeth and Isabella and would go on to become not only a musician but a dad. (Source: His son, Edward Brehm)

== Endorsements ==
Shaker Harmonica Microphones, RedPlate Amplifiers, Yonberg Harmonicas, Ziggies Music Phoenix

== Discography ==
=== Albums ===
Album title	Record label	Accreditation	Year of release
Out Of Control	Mad Man Records	(featured duet with Chico Chism) as lead vocal with Cold Shott & The Hurricane Horns	1990
The Gravedigger	JAEN Records CR 95-1003	Walkin' Cane Mark	1995
No Rest for the Wicked	JAEN Records CR 96-2007	Walkin' Cane Mark (featured duet with Lazy Lester)	1996
Live in Finland	(unreleased)	Walkin' Cane Mark	1998
(I'm) Big –N- Tasty	JAEN Records CR CR99-30012	Walkin' Cane Mark (with Guitar Shorty)	1999
The Walkin Cane Mark Blues Band – Live & Lowdown at Monroe's		Walkin' Cane Mark	2001
Live Bootleg at Monroe's	Enable Records	Walkin' Cane Mark with His Disciple of Soul Horns	2012
Tryin' To Make You Understand – REMASTERED	Enable Records 1001	Walkin' Cane Mark	2015
On The Prowl	Enable Records	Walkin' Cane Mark	2018

== Guest and compilation albums ==
=== Albums ===
That's All Right	JAEN CR95 1006	Harmonica on "Wake Up Marry" and "45 Walking Blues" (also album producer)	1995
Desert Blues Vol 1	CDGB Records	(various artists)	1997
Forbidden Pleasures	JAEN Records CR99-10013	(lead vocal on "Brown Eyed Girl" and "Jelly Jam")	1997
Live at the June Bug Festival	Shaker Music	(various artists)	1999
Blues Around the World vol.#1 (Tomiko Dixon & Friends) (two tracks "Gravedigger Blues" & "Back Door Man")	Grand Blues Music	(various artists)	2016
Money & Fame (Rap single)	Guest vocalist, singing lead on chorus	Artist: Salt	2018

== Sources ==
- Blues America (Radio)
- Sound Bites "Gravedigger" review by Lee Poole 1994
- Payson Roundup "Walkin' Cane's Gonna Boogie" (July 15, 1994) by Joe Harless
- Music Voice Magazine 1995 "Best Blues Vocalist Award (Walkin Cane Mark)"
- IL Blues Magazine Reviews 1995 "Walkin Cane Mark The Gravedigger"
- Music Voice Magazine 1995 "Talent Showcase – Walkin Cane Mark" by Robin Cote
- Blast Magazine (April–May) 1995 "Walkin Cane Mark's Blues" by Jarrett Hendricks p. 39
- Mesa Tribune Newspaper 1995 "Blues Blast Featuring Walkin Cane Mark" article by Betty Web
- Payson Roundup "June Bug Festival" (1995)
- Image Entertainment May 18, 1995
- Phoenix Gazette (section C1) "Profiles – Concerts" 1996 by Douglas McDaniel
- Living Blues No. 129 (Sept/Oct) 1996 "No Rest For The Wicked" album review by PRA
- Teton Valley Independent "Brewin The Blues W/ Walkin Cane Mark" July 24, 1997 p. 1B
- Boise Weekly "P Funk & The Cane" July 1997
- Cody Enterprise newspaper "Live In Person" August 1997
- Phoenix Gazette "Walkin' Cane Intones R&B with Gospel" 1997 by Douglas McDaniel
- Grand Blues Music press release May 2016
