= Sandra Dianne =

Malaysian singer-songwriter (1994–2020)

Sandra Dianne ساندرا ديانة
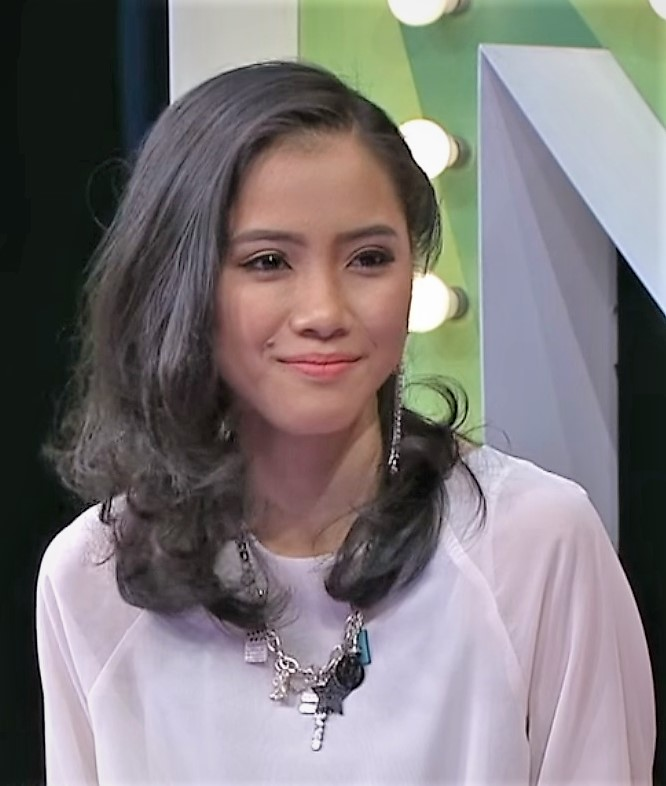
- Sandra interviewed on MeleTOP in 2016.

Background information
- Born: Alessandra Dianne Ampuria; 16 September 1994; Tuaran, Sabah, Malaysia
- Died: 11 September 2020 (aged 25) Putrajaya, Malaysia
- Genres: Ballad; pop; R&B
- Occupations: Singer; actor
- Instrument: Vocals
- Years active: 2014–2020
- Labels: Indigital Music; Sony Music Malaysia

Alessandra Dianne Ampuria (16 September 1994 – 11 September 2020) was a Malaysian singer-songwriter. She began writing music when she was 14 and came to prominence in the TV3 reality television show Mentor Legend. Dianne was one of 12 participants in the third series of the Astro Ria programme Big Stage.

== Early life ==
She was born Alessandra Dianne Ampuria on 16 September 1994, in Tuaran, Sabah, Malaysia. She was the daughter of Ampuria Jasthy and Nur Syakinah Abdullah and had four siblings, a brother and two stepbrothers. Dianne was brought up a Muslim, and was a cousin of the actress Farah Nabilah. She briefly worked as a craftsman at an engineering company in Kuala Lumpur before she decided to leave the job to focus on her music career. She began to write music when she was 14 years of age and she did not have formal education in this field.

== Music career ==
When she was 20 years old in 2014, she took part in the TV3 reality television programme Mentor Legend, and was eliminated in the first week of the contest. Dianne's debut single, "Hey! Kau", was released in June 2015 and received radio airplay in Malaysia and was charted on multiple radio lists. She received the Red Box Award as the song "Hey! Kau" was one of the 10 most popular songs in Malaysia during 2016. That same year, Dianne performed the song on Muzik Muzik, although she failed to qualify for the music competition Anugerah Juara Lagu.

In April 2016, Dianne was one of the successful singers at the 25th Annual Harian Metro Tour Concert in Miri, Sarawak for her first appearance at the concert. That same year, her second single, "Ku Tak Mahu Cinta", was released. She released the ballad single Aku dan Kekasih in July 2017 so that she could challenge herself because ballads require more expression of emotion than pop songs. The single was accompanied by a music video in which Dianne was depicted as a zombie after the publisher and recording companies wanted to portray the singer as unhealthy as a consequence of problems with stress following the end of a relationship. Dianne's song failed to chart highly in Malaysia. The following year, Dianne joined fellow singers Mell Ahmad and Lii in the special Dona group project. She collaborated with Ben Zulu and Zizi Kirana on the single Terkemuka, and then with then new singer Ryan Deedat on the song Salima in 2018.

Dianne made an appearance on the TV3 telefilm Dari Jauh in 2019. She was nominated for the Best Collaborative Singer Award at the ERA Digital Music Awards 2018 for her duet with Deedat in the song Salima. The following year, she was one of 12 contestants of the third series of the Astro Ria programme Big Stage. Dianne switched to running a salted fish business so that she could receive another source of income during the COVID-19 pandemic in Malaysia. The singles Jelaskan and Sandra that she recorded were released after her death.

== Death ==
On the afternoon of 5 September 2020, Dianne lost control of the Haval H1 car she was driving in with her cousin on the North–South Expressway Central Link close to Subang Jaya as a result of brake issues and crashed into the left-hand side of a Nissan Almera ahead of her. She died as a consequence of her injuries at approximately 1 am five days later in the Intensive Care Unit of Putrajaya Hospital. Her remains was returned to Sabah and she was buried at Kampung Kauluan Islamic Cemetery, Tuaran. A prayer ceremony was held for her at the Tuanku Mizan Zainal Abidin Mosque, Putrajaya on 16 September.
