= Et godt stup i et grunt vann =

2020 studio album by Cezinando

Studio album by Cezinando
- Released: February 21, 2020
- Recorded: Summer 2019–2020
- Genre: Norwegian hip hop; pop; R&B
- Length: 28:26
- Language: Norwegian
- Label: 1111klubb
- Producer: Ole Torjus Hofvind; Aksel "Axxe" Carlson; Eivind Helgerød; Kristoffer Cezinando Karlsen

Cezinando chronology
Noen ganger og andre (2017)	Et godt stup i et grunt vann (2020)	Sprengkulde (2023)

Et godt stup i et grunt vann (English: A good plunge into a shallow water) is the fourth studio album by the Norwegian rapper Cezinando. It was released on February 21, 2020, through 1111klubb and distributed by Universal Music. The album follows the third studio album Noen ganger og andre (2017). Production was handled by Aksel "Axxe" Carlson, Ole Torjus Hofvind, and Eivind Helgerød.

== Background ==
The studio album was released on February 21, 2020, through 1111klubb and distributed by Universal Music. The title of the album is explained as a monostich poem by Cezinando. At the Norwegian radioshow, Nitimen, on NRK Cezinando explained when that the poem was something that got "stuck to his head" when he and Ole Torjus Hofvind were out for a walk after a long studio session.

== Critical reception ==
Professional ratings
Review scores
Source	Rating
Aftenposten	6/6 stars
Dagbladet	5/6 stars
Dagsavisen	6/6 stars
Gaffa	5/6 stars
Klassekampen	5.5/6 stars
NATT&DAG	5/6 stars
Stavanger Aftenblad	6/6 stars
VG	5/6 stars

Et godt stup i et grunt vann received widespread acclaim from music critics.

== Tracklist ==
Credits adapted from the album's liner notes on Tidal.

No.	Title	Writer(s)	Producers	Length
1.	"Spøkelser"	Kristoffer Cezinando Karlsen	Aksel Carlson; Eivind Helgerød; Ole Torjus Hofvind	3:38
2.	"Spiderman"	Karlsen	Carlson; Helgerød; Hofvind	2:37
3.	"Krokodilletårer"	Karlsen	Helgerød; Hofvind	3:13
4.	"Rosa sky"	Karlsen	Carlson; Helgerød; Karlsen; Hofvind	2:22
5.	"Grimaser (Idiomer for idioter)"	Karlsen	Carlson; Hofvind	2:31
6.	"Marionette"	Karlsen	Helgerød; Hofvind	2:18
7.	"Hollywood"	Karlsen	Helgerød; Hofvind	3:01
8.	"Hore og madonna"	Karlsen	Carlson; Hofvind	3:46
9.	"Kristoffer Robin"	Inge Sellevåg; Karlsen; Hofvind	Carlson; Helgerød; Karlsen; Hofvind	4:55
Total length:				28:26

== Personnel ==
Credits adapted from Tidal.

=== Musicians ===
- Cezinando – lead vocals (all tracks), programming (track 4, 7, 9)
- Jakob Eri Myhre – trumpet (track 1, 4–6, 9)
- Andreas Rotevatn – trombone (track 1, 4–6, 9)
- Einar Stray – piano (track 1, 9)
- Thomas Kongshavn – guitar (track 4)
- Ole Torjus Hofvind – keyboards (track 1–7, 9), programming (track 1–7, 9)
- Eivind Helgerød – keyboards (track 1–4, 9), programming (track 1–4, 9)
- Aksel "Axxe" Carlson – keyboards (track 1–2, 4–5, 8–9), programming (track 1–2, 4–5, 8–9)

=== Technical ===
- George Tanderø – mastering (all tracks)
- Simon Dolmen Bergseth – mixing (all tracks)
- Ole Torjus Hofvind – recording (track 1–7, 9)
- Aksel "Axxe" Carlson – recording (track 5, 8)
- Eivind Helgerød – recording (track 5–6)

=== Management and marketing ===
- Cezinando – executive production
- Little Big Sister – project support and coordination

== Charts ==
Chart (2020)	Peak position
Norwegian Albums (VG-lista)	1
Norwegian Vinyl List	1

== Release history ==
Region	Version	Date	Format(s)	Label	Ref.
Norway	Et godt stup i et grunt vann	February 21, 2020	Digital download; streaming	1111klubb; Universal Music	
Norway	Et godt stup i et grunt vann	May 22, 2020	Vinyl	1111klubb; Universal Music	
