= Desires (song) =

2020 song by Drake featuring Future

Song by Drake featuring Future

from the album Dark Lane Demo Tapes
- Released: May 1, 2020
- Recorded: 2019–2020
- Length: 3:58
- Label: OVO Sound; Republic
- Songwriters: Aubrey Graham; Nayvadius Wilburn; Darius Hill; Noel Cadastre
- Producers: D. Hill; Noel Cadastre

"Desires" is a song by Canadian rapper Drake featuring American rapper Future. It was released as the tenth track from Drake's fifth mixtape Dark Lane Demo Tapes, on May 1, 2020. The song was written by Drake and Playboi Carti, alongside record producers D. Hill and Noel Cadastre.

== Background ==
On August 29, 2019, Future teased a preview of a song under the working title "I Know" via his Instagram Story. On December 20, 2019, another preview surfaced online. A demo of the song was leaked on January 4, 2020. Later, Drake shared the full song on his SoundCloud account, under the title "Desires Leak 2020 Super Future Drake". On February 4, 2020, another version of the song with additional vocals of Puerto Rican rapper Anuel AA got leaked online. The song was later added to all streaming services on May 1, 2020, and placed on Drake's fifth mixtape Dark Lane Demo Tapes.

== Commercial performance ==
"Desires" debuted at number 27 on the US Billboard Hot 100 on the chart dated May 16, 2020. The song also debuted and peaked at number 28 on the Billboard Canadian Hot 100 on the same date. It peaked at number 39 on the UK Streaming Chart. "Desires" also appeared at number 81 in Portugal and at number 111 in France.

== Charts ==
Chart performance for "Desires"
Chart (2020)	Peak position
Canada Hot 100 (Billboard)	28
France (SNEP)	111
Portugal (AFP)	81
UK Audio Streaming (Official Charts)	39
US Billboard Hot 100	27
US Hot R&B/Hip-Hop Songs (Billboard)	11
