= Lance Martin =

Jazz flute player

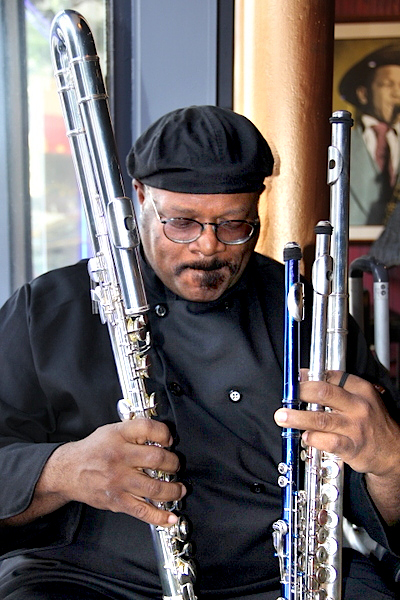
Martin in 2014

Lance Martin (December 29, 1959 - May 15, 2020) was an American jazz flute player and music instructor at Wellesley College.

Martin was born in Pittsburgh, Pennsylvania, the son of a Baptist preacher. He started playing the flute at age seven, supposedly because his mother thought trumpets and drums were too loud. His early exposure to music was through the church and records he would get at his local library.

He went to Berklee College of Music in Boston as a Jazz Composition Major. He joined Roxbury's Twelfth Baptist Church, and established the 12th Baptist Gospel Brass Ensemble, which played there for 30 years.

Martin also regularly played at the Ryles Jazz Club in Cambridge as part of the Lance Martin Jazz Trio playing all-request sets for 36 years, their "most booked act". The Lance Martin Band played in a style they called physical jazz, mixing visually physical movements with jazz, R&B, and gospel.

== Discography ==
- Physical Jazz: The Lance Martin Band
- The Black Sea Salsa Band
- Black Orchid: The Ron Murphy CD
- Our Day will Come: Vivian Male
- Give Him Praise: Felix Mwangi
- Hey Stranger: Adrian Sicam
- African Underground Vol. 1 HIP-HOP Senega, Physical Jazz
