= Babeheaven =

British music duo

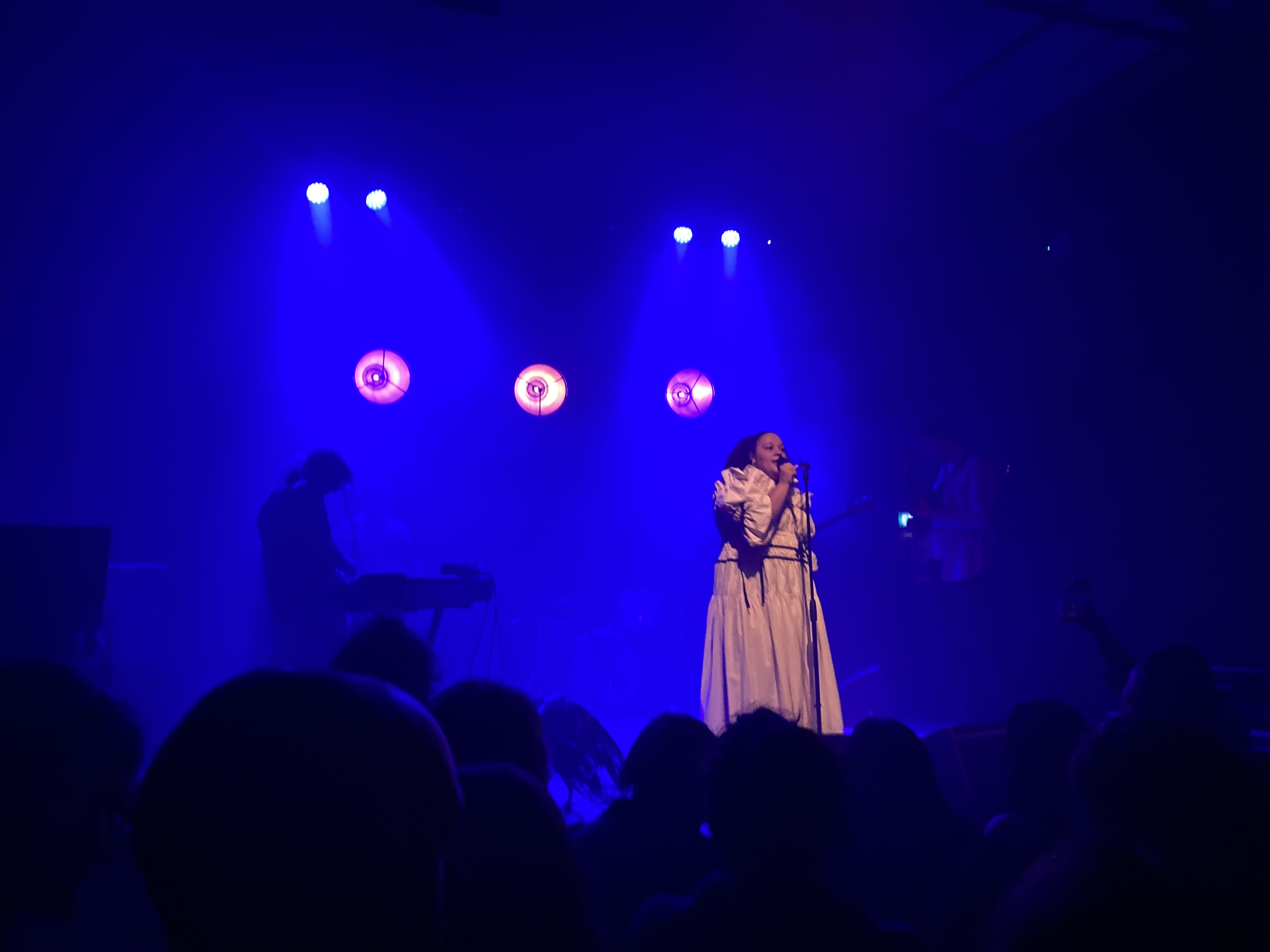
- Babeheaven performing at Village Underground, London, 2022

Background information
- Origin: London, England
- Genres: Indie rock; Trip hop; Dream pop
- Years active: 2016–present
- Members: Nancy Andersen; Jamie Travis

Babeheaven is a British music duo known for their blend of trip-hop, indie, and electronic influences. Formed in West London, the band consists of vocalist Nancy Andersen and instrumentalist Jamie Travis. Their music is characterised by ethereal vocals, lush instrumentation, and introspective lyricism.

== History ==
Babeheaven was founded in the mid-2010s, with Andersen and Travis developing their sound through a shared appreciation for soul, electronic, and alternative music. Andersen, the daughter of a musician, grew up immersed in music, while Travis' father a prominent figure in the music industry. The duo gained early recognition through independent releases and live performances, eventually drawing attention from major music publications.

In 2019 the band released Suspended Animation. Its cover artwork by photographer Joyce Ng was acquired by the National Portrait Gallery for its permanent collection in 2023.

Their debut album, Home for Now, was released in 2020 to positive reviews from Pitchfork and The Guardian highlighting them as "one to watch".

The band's follow-up album, Sink Into Me (2022), further solidified their presence in the indie music scene. Publications such as NME praised its atmospheric production and emotive songwriting.

In 2025, the duo released the EP Slower Than Sound through the independent label Scenic Route. Recorded largely in Andersen’s home studio, the five-track release featured a guest appearance from Samba Jean-Baptiste and included a cover of Todd Rundgren’s “Tiny Demons”. Reviews noted a shift towards a more minimal and introspective sound, with publications highlighting its restrained production and reflective tone compared with the band’s earlier releases.

=== Live performances and collaborations ===
The band has performed live sessions with Boiler Room, BBC at Maida Vale COLORS and collaborated with various artists, including Navy Blue and Deem Spencer. They have also worked with directors and visual artists to create striking music videos, including Frank Lebon, Tegen Williams and Raf Fellner. Babeheaven has toured in support of acts such as The Japanese House, Nilüfer Yanya and Loyle Carner, further expanding their reach within the alternative music scene.

Fashion and visual aesthetics are integral to Babeheaven's identity, leading to collaborations with brands like Ganni and features in Vogue.

== Critical reception ==
Babeheaven has been well-received by music critics, with praise for their atmospheric production and emotive lyricism. Clash Magazine described their work as "cinematic and deeply personal," while The Independent highlighted their ability to blend genres seamlessly. Additional coverage has come from Nylon, The Line of Best Fit, Vice, The Forty-Five, The Skinny, and Bricks Magazine, reinforcing the band's notability.

== Discography ==
=== Studio albums ===
- Home for Now (2020)
- Sink Into Me (2022)

=== EPs ===
- Circles (2019)
- Suspended Animation (2019)
- Slower Than Sound (2025)

=== Singles ===
- "Heaven / Friday Sky" (2016)
- "Moving On" (2016)
- "Your Love / It's Not Easy" (2017)
- "November" (2019)
- "Human Nature" (2020)
- "Craziest Things" (2020)
- "Don't Wake Me" (2021)
- "The Hours" (2022)
- "Make Me Wanna" (2022)
- "Beloved" (2025)
- "Picture This" (2025)
