= Giveon discography =

R&B recording artist discography

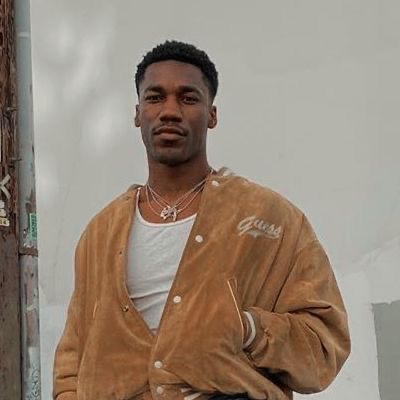
- Studio albums: 2
- EPs: 2
- Singles: 15

The discography of American singer-songwriter Giveon consists of two studio albums, one compilation album, two extended plays, and nine singles (including one as a featured artist). On March 27, 2020, Giveon released his debut extended play, Take Time. The EP reached number 35 on the Billboard 200. It produced the top-20 single, "Heartbreak Anniversary", which reached number 16 on the Billboard Hot 100. That same year, he released a collaboration with Drake, "Chicago Freestyle", which debuted and peaked at number 14 on the Hot 100. On October 2, 2020, Giveon released his second extended play, When It's All Said and Done. The EP debuted and peaked at number 93 on the Billboard 200. On March 12, 2021, Giveon released his debut compilation album, When It's All Said and Done...Take Time. The album debuted and peaked at number five on the Billboard 200. That same year, he was featured alongside Daniel Caesar on Justin Bieber's single, "Peaches", which debuted and peaked atop the Hot 100, giving him his first chart-topping single. Later that year, he was featured alongside Lil Durk on Drake's song, "In the Bible", which debuted and peaked at number seven on the Hot 100. On June 24, 2022, Giveon released his debut studio album, Give or Take. He released his second studio album, Beloved, on July 11, 2025.

== Studio albums ==
List of studio albums, with selected details and chart positions
Title	Details	Peak chart positions						Certifications
Title	Details	US	AUS	CAN	NLD	NZ	UK	Certifications
Give or Take	Released: June 24, 2022; Label: Epic, Not So Fast; Formats: CD, digital download, streaming, cassette	11	30	15	36	19	37	BPI: Gold; MC: Gold; RMNZ: Gold
Beloved	Released: July 11, 2025; Label: Epic, Not So Fast; Formats: CD, digital download, streaming, cassette	8	16	24	19	10	38	

== Compilation albums ==
List of compilation albums, with selected details and chart positions
Title	Details	Peak chart positions						Certifications
Title	Details	US	US R&B /HH	US R&B	CAN	NZ	UK	Certifications
When It's All Said and Done... Take Time	Released: March 12, 2021; Label: Epic, Not So Fast; Format: CD, LP, DL, streaming	5	3	2	15	17	87	RIAA: Platinum; BPI: Gold; MC: Platinum; RMNZ: 2× Platinum

== Extended plays ==
List of extended plays, with selected details and chart positions
Title	Details	Peak chart positions						
Title	Details	US	US R&B /HH	US R&B	AUS	CAN	FRA	NLD
Take Time	Released: March 27, 2020; Label: Epic, Not So Fast; Format: Digital download, streaming, LP	35	19	4	—	49	—	53
When It's All Said and Done	Released: October 2, 2020; Label: Epic, Not So Fast; Format: Digital download, streaming, LP	93	45	9	32	86	185	—
"—" denotes items that did not chart or was not released in that territory.

== Singles ==
=== As lead artist ===
List of singles as lead artist, with selected chart positions, showing year released and album name
Title	Year	Peak chart positions										Certifications	Album
Title	Year	US	US R&B/HH	US R&B	AUS	CAN	IRE	NLD	NZ	SWI	UK	Certifications	Album
"Garden Kisses"	2018	—	—	—	—	—	—	—	—	—	—		Non-album singles
"Fields"	2018	—	—	—	—	—	—	—	—	—	—		Non-album singles
"Like I Want You"	2019	87	—	9	—	—	—	—	—	—	—	RIAA: 3× Platinum; BPI: Silver; MC: 2× Platinum; RMNZ: Platinum	Take Time
"Heartbreak Anniversary"	2020	16	5	3	12	25	30	50	2	34	35	RIAA: 6× Platinum; ARIA: 2× Platinum; BPI: Platinum; MC: 5× Platinum; RMNZ: 5× Platinum	Take Time
"Stuck on You"	2020	—	—	17	—	—	—	—	— (Note: "Stuck on You" did not enter the NZ Top 40 Singles Chart, but peaked at number 40 on the NZ Hot Singles Chart.)	—	—	RIAA: Platinum; BPI: Silver; MC: Platinum; RMNZ: Platinum	When It's All Said and Done
"O Christmas Tree"	2020	—	—	—	—	—	—	—	—	—	—		Non-album single
"For Tonight"	2021	61	17	6	—	78	—	—	— (Note: "For Tonight" did not enter the NZ Top 40 Singles Chart, but peaked at number seven on the NZ Hot Singles Chart.)	—	—	RIAA: Platinum; BPI: Silver; MC: 2× Platinum; RMNZ: Platinum	Give or Take
"Lie Again"	2022	— (Note: "Lie Again" did not enter the Billboard Hot 100, but peaked at number nine on the Bubbling Under Hot 100 chart.)	48	11	—	—	—	—	— (Note: "Lie Again" did not enter the NZ Top 40 Singles Chart, but peaked at number 16 on the NZ Hot Singles Chart.)	—	—	RIAA: Gold; MC: Gold	Give or Take
"Lost Me"	2022	— (Note: "Lost Me" did not enter the Billboard Hot 100, but peaked at number 11 on the Bubbling Under Hot 100 chart.)	42	8	—	—	—	— (Note: "Lost Me" did not enter the Dutch Single Top 100, but peaked at number 22 on the Single Tip chart.)	— (Note: "Lost Me" did not enter the NZ Top 40 Singles Chart, but peaked at number 26 on the NZ Hot Singles Chart.)	—	85	RIAA: Gold; BPI: Silver; MC: Platinum; RMNZ: Gold	Give or Take
"Time"	2022	—	—	—	—	—	—	—	—	—	—		Non-album singles
"The First Noel"	2023	—	—	—	—	—	—	—	—	—	—		Non-album singles
"Twenties"	2025	55	19	6	—	57	—	— (Note: "Twenties" did not enter the Dutch Single Top 100, but peaked at number one on the Single Tip chart.)	33	—	61	MC: Gold	Beloved
"Rather Be"	2025	— (Note: "Rather Be" did not enter the Billboard Hot 100, but peaked at number 10 on the Bubbling Under Hot 100 chart.)	30	—	—	—	—	—	— (Note: "Rather Be" did not enter the NZ Top 40 Singles Chart, but peaked at number 8 on the NZ Hot Singles Chart.)	—	—		Beloved
"Dancing in the Smoke"	2025	—	—	—	—	—	—	—	— (Note: "Dancing in the Smoke" did not enter the NZ Top 40 Singles Chart, but peaked at number 24 on the NZ Hot Singles Chart.)	—	—		Non-album single
"—" denotes a recording that did not chart or was not released in that territory.

=== As featured artist ===
List of singles as featured artist, with selected chart positions, showing year released and album name
Title	Year	Peak chart positions										Certifications	Album
Title	Year	US	US R&B /HH	US R&B	AUS	CAN	IRE	NLD	NZ	SWI	UK	Certifications	Album
"Peaches" (Justin Bieber featuring Daniel Caesar and Giveon)	2021	1	1	1	1	1	1	1	1	2	2	RIAA: 4× Platinum; ARIA: 5× Platinum; BPI: 2× Platinum; MC: 6× Platinum; RMNZ: 5× Platinum	Justice
"Are You Even Real" (Teddy Swims featuring Giveon)	2025	59	10	4	—	65	—	89	— (Note: "Are You Even Real" did not enter the NZ Top 40 Singles Chart, but peaked at number 2 on the NZ Hot Singles Chart.)	—	—	ARIA: Gold; MC: Gold; RMNZ: Gold	I've Tried Everything but Therapy (Part 2)
"—" denotes a recording that did not chart or was not released in that territory.

== Other charted songs ==
List of singles as featured artist, with selected chart positions, showing year released and album name
Title	Year	Peak chart positions								Certifications	Album
Title	Year	US	US R&B /HH	US R&B	CAN	NZ	SA	SWE	UK	Certifications	Album
"Chicago Freestyle" (with Drake)	2020	14	11	—	13	31	—	— (Note: "Chicago Freestyle" did not enter the Swedish Singellista Chart, but peaked at number eight on the Swedish Heatseeker Chart.)	10	RIAA: 5× Platinum; ARIA: 3× Platinum; BPI: Platinum; RMNZ: 2× Platinum	Dark Lane Demo Tapes
"Still Your Best"	2020	—	—	18	—	—	—	—	—	RIAA: Platinum; MC: Platinum; RMNZ: Gold	When It's All Said and Done
"Last Time" (featuring Snoh Aalegra)	2020	—	—	25	—	—	—	—	—	RIAA: Gold	When It's All Said and Done
"The Beach"	2020	—	—	25	—	—	—	—	—	RIAA: Platinum; MC: Gold; RMNZ: Gold	Take Time
"World We Created"	2020	—	—	—	—	—	—	—	—	RIAA: Gold	Take Time
"Favorite Mistake"	2020	—	—	23	—	—	—	—	—	RIAA: Platinum; MC: Gold	Take Time
"Vanish"	2020	—	—	—	—	—	—	—	—	RIAA: Gold	When It's All Said and Done... Take Time
"All to Me"	2021	— (Note: "All to Me" did not enter the Billboard Hot 100, but peaked at number four on the Bubbling Under Hot 100 chart.)	43	12	—	— (Note: "All to Me" did not enter the NZ Top 40 Singles Chart, but peaked at number 16 on the NZ Hot Singles Chart.)	—	—	—	RIAA: Platinum; MC: Gold	When It's All Said and Done... Take Time
"In the Bible" (Drake featuring Lil Durk and Giveon)	2021	7	6	—	18	—	—	63	— (Note: "In the Bible" did not enter the UK Singles Chart, as chart rules only allow three songs per artist to chart within the top one hundred at a time, but peaked at number eight on the UK Streaming Chart.)	ARIA: Gold; BPI: Silver; MC: Platinum	Certified Lover Boy
"Let Me Go"	2022	—	—	24	—	— (Note: "Let Me Go" did not enter the NZ Top 40 Singles Chart, but peaked at number 31 on the NZ Hot Singles Chart.)	26	—	—		Give or Take
"Scarred"	2022	—	—	—	—	— (Note: "Scarred" did not enter the NZ Top 40 Singles Chart, but peaked at number 33 on the NZ Hot Singles Chart.)	38	—	—		Give or Take
"Dec 11th"	2022	—	—	—	—	—	57	—	—		Give or Take
"This Will Do"	2022	—	—	—	—	—	55	—	—		Give or Take
"Get to You"	2022	—	—	—	—	—	62	—	—		Give or Take
"Tryna Be"	2022	—	—	—	—	—	67	—	—		Give or Take
"Make You Mine"	2022	—	—	—	—	—	63	—	—		Give or Take
"July 16th"	2022	—	—	—	—	—	94	—	—		Give or Take
"Another Heartbreak"	2022	—	—	—	—	—	77	—	—		Give or Take
"At Least We Tried"	2022	—	—	—	—	—	99	—	—		Give or Take
"Mud"	2025	—	—	19	—	— (Note: "Mud" did not enter the NZ Top 40 Singles Chart, but peaked at number 21 on the NZ Hot Singles Chart.)	—	—	—		Beloved
"Strangers"	2025	— (Note: "Strangers" did not enter the Billboard Hot 100, but peaked at number 23 on the Bubbling Under Hot 100 chart.)	—	18	—	— (Note: "Strangers" did not enter the NZ Top 40 Singles Chart, but peaked at number 19 on the NZ Hot Singles Chart.)	—	—	—		Beloved
"Numb"	2025	—	—	20	—	— (Note: "Numb" did not enter the NZ Top 40 Singles Chart, but peaked at number 22 on the NZ Hot Singles Chart.)	—	—	—		Beloved
"I Can Tell"	2025	— (Note: "I Can Tell" did not enter the Billboard Hot 100, but peaked at number 6 on the Bubbling Under Hot 100 chart.)	41	14	—	— (Note: "I Can Tell" did not enter the NZ Top 40 Singles Chart, but peaked at number 15 on the NZ Hot Singles Chart.)	—	—	—		Beloved
"Diamonds for Your Pain"	2025	—	—	25	—	—	—	—	—		Beloved
"Keeper"	2025	—	—	21	—	—	—	—	—		Beloved
"Jezebel"	2026	—	—	—	—	— (Note: "Jezebel" did not enter the NZ Top 40 Singles Chart, but peaked at number 14 on the NZ Hot Singles Chart.)	—	—	—		Beloved: Act II
"Save Some for Me" (featuring Kehlani)	2026	—	—	—	—	— (Note: "Save Some for Me" did not enter the NZ Top 40 Singles Chart, but peaked at number 20 on the NZ Hot Singles Chart.)	—	—	—		Beloved: Act II
"Fool Me Once" (featuring Leon Thomas)	2026	—	—	—	—	— (Note: "Fool Me Once" did not enter the NZ Top 40 Singles Chart, but peaked at number 19 on the NZ Hot Singles Chart.)	—	—	—		Beloved: Act II
"Keeper" (featuring Teddy Swims)	2026	—	—	—	—	— (Note: "Keeper" did not enter the NZ Top 40 Singles Chart, but peaked at number 21 on the NZ Hot Singles Chart.)	—	—	—		Beloved: Act II
"—" denotes a recording that did not chart or was not released in that territory.

== Guest appearances ==
Title	Year	Other performer(s)	Album
"Chicago Freestyle"	2020	Drake	Dark Lane Demo Tapes
"In the Bible"	2021	Drake, Lil Durk	Certified Lover Boy
"Last Heartbreak Song"	2024	Ayra Starr	The Year I Turned 21
