= BET Awards 2022 =

2022 American television program

2022 BET Awards
- Date: June 26, 2022
- Location: Microsoft Theater, Los Angeles, California
- Presented by: Black Entertainment Television
- Hosted by: Taraji P. Henson

Highlights
- Most awards: Anderson Paak (4)
- Most nominations: Doja Cat (6)
- Website: www.bet.com/shows/bet-awards.html

Television/radio coverage
- Network: BET; BET Her; Comedy Central; Logo TV; MTV; MTV2; Nick at Nite; Pop TV; TV Land; VH1 (simulcast)
- Runtime: 3 hours, 28 minutes
- Viewership: 2.06 million
- Produced by: Jesse Collins; Connie Orlando; Jeannae Rouzan-Clay; Dionne Harmon; Taraji P. Henson (executive producers)
- Directed by: Sandra Restrepo

The 22nd BET Awards took place on June 26, 2022. The ceremony celebrates achievements in entertainment and honors music, sports, television, and movies. The ceremony was hosted for the second time by Taraji P. Henson at the Microsoft Theater in Los Angeles, California.

The nominees were announced on June 1, 2022. Doja Cat received the most nominations with 6, ahead of Drake and Ari Lennox, who received with four nominations each.

American rapper, songwriter and producer Sean Combs, professionally known as Puff Daddy and Diddy, was honored with the BET Lifetime Achievement Award for his "incomparable cultural force and creative visionary whose impact has created historic paradigm shifts across music, media, fashion, and lifestyle".

== Performers ==
The list of performers was announced on June 16, 2022.

Artist(s)	Song(s)
Main show
Lizzo	"About Damn Time"
Jack Harlow; DJ Drama; Lil Wayne; Brandy	"Poison" "First Class"
Maverick City Music; Kirk Franklin	"Kingdom" "Melodies from Heaven"
Fireboy DML	"Playboy" "Peru"
Doechii	"Persuasive" "Crazy"
Muni Long	"Time Machine" "Hrs and Hrs"
Chance the Rapper; Joey Badass	"The Highs & the Lows"
Ella Mai; Babyface; Roddy Ricch	"DFMU" "Keeps On Fallin" "How"
Latto; Young Dirty Bastard; Mariah Carey	"It's Givin" "Big Energy (Remix)"
Diddy; Jodeci; Mary J. Blige; Shyne; Bryson Tiller; Busta Rhymes; The Lox; Lil' Kim; Faith Evans; Maverick City Music	Medley "Come and Talk to Me "I'm Goin' Down" "Victory" "Bad Boyz" "All About the Benjamins" "Pass the Courvoisier, Part II" "Gotta Move On" "I'll Be Missing You"
Chlöe	"Surprise" "Treat Me"
Giveon	"Heartbreak Anniversary" "For Tonight" "Lie Again"
BET Amplified Stage
Gogo Morrow	"In the Way"
Ogi	"I Got It"

== Winners and nominees ==
Album of the Year	Video of the Year
An Evening with Silk Sonic – Silk Sonic; Back of My Mind – H.E.R.; Call Me If You Get Lost – Tyler, the Creator; Certified Lover Boy – Drake; Donda – Kanye West; Heaux Tales, Mo' Tales: The Deluxe – Jazmine Sullivan; Planet Her – Doja Cat	Baby Keem and Kendrick Lamar – "Family Ties"; Silk Sonic – "Smokin out the Window"; Chlöe – "Have Mercy"; Doja Cat featuring SZA – "Kiss Me More"; Ari Lennox – "Pressure"; Drake featuring Future and Young Thug – "Way 2 Sexy"
Best New Artist	Best Collaboration
Latto; Baby Keem; Benny the Butcher; Bleu; Muni Long; Tems	Wizkid featuring Justin Bieber and Tems – "Essence"; DJ Khaled featuring Lil Baby and Lil Durk – "Every Chance I Get"; Baby Keem and Kendrick Lamar – "Family Ties"; Doja Cat featuring SZA – "Kiss Me More"; Drake featuring Future and Young Thug – "Way 2 Sexy"; Bia featuring Nicki Minaj – "Whole Lotta Money"
Best Female R&B/Pop Artist	Best Male R&B/Pop Artist
Jazmine Sullivan; Ari Lennox; Chlöe; Doja Cat; H.E.R.; Mary J. Blige; Summer Walker	The Weeknd; Bleu; Blxst; Chris Brown; Giveon; Lucky Daye; Wizkid
Best Female Hip Hop Artist	Best Male Hip Hop Artist
Megan Thee Stallion; Cardi B; Doja Cat; Latto; Nicki Minaj; Saweetie	Kendrick Lamar; Drake; Future; J. Cole; Jack Harlow; Kanye West; Lil Baby
Best Group	Dr. Bobby Jones Best Gospel/Inspirational Award
Silk Sonic; Chloe x Halle; City Girls; Lil Baby and Lil Durk; Migos; Young Dolph and Key Glock	Kirk Franklin and Lil Baby – "We Win"; Marvin Sapp – "All in Your Hands"; Kanye West – "Come to Life"; Kelly Price – "Grace"; Fred Hammond – "Hallelujah"; H.E.R. and Tauren Wells – "Hold Us Together (Hope Mix)"; Elevation Worship and Maverick City Music – "Jireh"
BET Her Award	Video Director of the Year
Mary J. Blige – "Good Morning Gorgeous"; Alicia Keys – "Best of Me (Originals)"; Chlöe – "Have Mercy"; Ari Lennox – "Pressure"; Jazmine Sullivan – "Roster"; Summer Walker featuring Ari Lennox – "Unloyal"; Doja Cat – "Woman"	Anderson .Paak; Benny Boom; Beyoncé and Dikayl Rimmasch; Director X; Hype Williams; Missy Elliott
Best Movie	Best Actress
King Richard; Candyman; Respect; Space Jam: A New Legacy; Summer of Soul; The Harder They Fall	Zendaya; Aunjanue Ellis; Coco Jones; Issa Rae; Jennifer Hudson; Mary J. Blige; Queen Latifah; Quinta Brunson; Regina King
Best Actor	YoungStars Award
Will Smith; Adrian Holmes; Anthony Anderson; Damson Idris; Denzel Washington; Forest Whitaker; Jabari Banks; Sterling K. Brown	Marsai Martin; Akira Akbar; Demi Singleton; Miles Brown; Saniyya Sidney; Storm Reid
Sportswoman of the Year	Sportsman of the Year
Naomi Osaka; Brittney Griner; Candace Parker; Serena Williams; Sha'Carri Richardson; Simone Biles	Stephen Curry; Aaron Donald; Bubba Wallace; Giannis Antetokounmpo; Ja Morant; LeBron James
Best International Act	Lifetime Achievement Award
Tems (Nigeria); Dave (UK); Dinos (France); Fally Ipupa (DRC); Fireboy DML (Nigeria); Little Simz (UK); Ludmilla (Brazil); Major League DJz (South Africa); Tayc (France)	Sean Combs
Best New International Act
MD Chefe (Brazil); Ayra Starr (Nigeria); Pheelz (Nigeria); Cleo Sol (UK); SDM (France); Digga D (UK); Guy2Bezbar (France); Young Stunna (South Africa)

== In Memoriam ==
- Roe v. Wade
- Young Dolph
- Calvin Simon
- Lusia Harris
- Fred Parris
- Betty Davis
- Jimmy Johnson
- Syl Johnson
- Lashun Pace
- Jessie D
- Moses J. Moseley
- Kevin Samuels
- Andre Leon Talley
- Trouble
- Andre Woolfolk
- James Mtume
- Max Julien
- Fitzroy "Bunny Diamond" Simpson
- Donald "Tabby Diamond" Shaw
- Dwayne Haskins
- Tytyana Miller
- Biz Markie
- Traci Braxton
- Bob Lanier
- Johnny Brown
- Cheslie Kryst
- DJ Kay Slay
- Lil Keed
- Michael K. Williams
- Kangol Kid
- Virgil Abloh
- Sidney Poitier

At the end of the tribute section, the last panel honors those who lost their lives to gun violence such as the Uvalde shooting.
