= When It's All Said and Done... Take Time =

Compilation album by Giveon
- Released: March 12, 2021
- Genre: R&B
- Length: 36:50
- Label: Epic; Not So Fast
- Producer: Rodrigo Barahona; Berkli Music; Boi-1da; Giveon; Kelsey Gonzalez; Illangelo; Loshendrix; Maneesh; Dominic Matthews; Don Mills; Schylar O'Neal; Peter Lee Johnson; Jahaan Sweet; River Tiber; Sevn Thomas; Leon Thomas; WondaGurl; Yakob

Giveon chronology
When It's All Said and Done (2020)	When It's All Said and Done... Take Time (2021)	Give or Take (2022)

When It's All Said and Done... Take Time is a compilation album by American R&B singer and songwriter Giveon, released by Epic Records and Not So Fast on March 12, 2021. The album combines his two EPs When It's All Said and Done and Take Time, along with a new song, "All to Me". The album was certified gold in 2021, and certified platinum later in 2022.

== Background ==
Giveon first teased the album on Twitter on March 4, 2021:

The anniversary for the release of Take Time is creeping up on us all..

I decided to combine both of my first two eps into one project: When It's All Said and Done... Take Time. I also added a new song to the project.

3/12.. pre-save at midnight ✨

== Critical reception ==
Professional ratings
Review scores
Source	Rating
AllMusic	4/5 stars

Andy Kellman of AllMusic said, "Each highlight provides incontrovertible proof that Giveon is among the most promising R&B artists of the early 2020s."

=== Year-end lists ===
Year-end lists
Publication	List	Rank	Ref.
Billboard	The 10 Best R&B Albums of 2021: Critics' Picks	3	
Vibe	The 21 Best R&B Albums Of 2021: Staff Picks	21	

== Track listing ==
When It's All Said and Done... Take Time track listing
No.	Title	Lyrics	Music	Producer(s)	Length
1.	"The Beach"	Giveon Evans	Evans; Loshendrix; Matthew Samuels; Yakob	Boi-1da; Yakob; Loshendrix	3:25
2.	"World We Created"	Trey Campbell; Sevn Thomas	Campbell; Maneesh; S. Thomas	S. Thomas; Maneesh; Yakob	3:13
3.	"Take Time (Interlude)"	Evans	Evans	Giveon	0:45
4.	"Favorite Mistake"	Evans	Evans; Rodrigo Barahona; S. Thomas	S. Thomas; Giveon; Barahona	2:52
5.	"This Ain't Love"	Evans; Ant Clemons; Varren Wade	Evans; Clemons; Loshendrix; WondaGurl; Jahaan Sweet; Wade	WondaGurl; Sweet; Loshendrix	2:44
6.	"Heartbreak Anniversary"	Evans; S. Thomas; Wade	Evans; Maneesh; S. Thomas; Wade	S. Thomas; Maneesh	3:18
7.	"Like I Want You"	Evans; Marcus Semaj; S. Thomas	Evans; Loshendrix; Semaj; Sweet; River Tiber; S. Thomas	S. Thomas; Sweet; River Tiber; Loshendrix	4:20
8.	"Vanish"	Evans	Evans; Berkli Music; Kelsey Gonzalez; S. Thomas	S. Thomas; Berkli Music; Gonzalez	3:29
9.	"When It's All Said and Done"	Evans	Evans; Barahona	Giveon; Barahona	0:55
10.	"Still Your Best"	Evans	Evans; Dominic Matthews; Schyler O'Neal	S. Thomas; O'Neal; Matthews	2:57
11.	"Last Time" (featuring Snoh Aalegra)	Evans; Snoh Aalegra	Evans; Snoh Aalegra; Don Mills	S. Thomas; Mills	3:13
12.	"Stuck on You"	Evans	Evans; Barahona; Thomas	Boi-1da; S. Thomas; Sweet; Giveon; Barahona	3:25
13.	"All to Me"	Evans; Peter Lee Johnson; Carlos Montagnese; Samuels; Sweet; Leon Thomas	Evans; Johnson; Montagnese; Samuels; Sweet; L. Thomas	Boi-1da; Illangelo; Sweet; L. Thomas; Johnson; Barahona	2:07
Total length:					36:50

== Personnel ==
Credits are adapted from Tidal.

Musicians

- Giveon – lead vocals (all tracks), background vocals (tracks 1, 2, 4–12), arrangement (1, 4, 9, 12)
- Sevn Thomas – arrangement (1–8, 10), programming (2–8, 10–12), background vocals (2, 6)
- Rodrigo Barahona – arrangement (1, 4, 9, 12), programming (9)
- Boi-1da – programming (1, 12)
- Yakob – arrangement (1)
- Ariel Shrum – flugelhorn (2)
- Loshendrix – arrangement (5), all instruments (7)
- Jahaan Sweet – arrangement (5), programming (7)
- WondaGurl – arrangement, programming (5)
- Ant Clemons – background vocals (5)
- River Tiber – programming (7)
- Schyler O'Neal – arrangement (10)
- Snoh Aalegra – lead vocals, background vocals (11)
- Don Mills – arrangement (11)

Technical

- John Kercy – mixing (1–12)
- Jim Caruana – mixing, engineering, recording (11)
- Rodrigo Barahona – mixing (13), engineering (1–6, 8–12), recording (1, 2, 4–6, 8–12)
- Colin Leonard – mastering
- Gehring Miller – engineering, recording (7)
- Giveon – recording (3)

== Charts ==
=== Weekly charts ===
Weekly chart performance
Chart (2021)	Peak position
Canadian Albums (Billboard)	15
UK Albums (OCC)	87
US Billboard 200	5
US Top R&B/Hip-Hop Albums (Billboard)	3

=== Year-end charts ===
Year-end chart performance
Chart (2021)	Position
US Billboard 200	72
US Top R&B/Hip-Hop Albums (Billboard)	36

== Certifications ==
Certifications
Region	Certification	Certified units/sales
Canada (Music Canada)	Platinum	80,000^{‡}
New Zealand (RMNZ)	2× Platinum	30,000^{‡}
United Kingdom (BPI)	Gold	100,000^{‡}
United States (RIAA)	Platinum	1,000,000^{‡}
^{‡} Sales+streaming figures based on certification alone.
