= Give or Take =

Studio album by Giveon
- Released: June 24, 2022
- Genres: R&B; soul
- Length: 45:12
- Labels: Not So Fast; Epic
- Producers: Boi-1da; Braxton; Brooks Ivory; Caleb Bryant; Cardo Got Wings; Rogét Chahayed; Deats; Eye; Giveon; Greyyforever; Akeel Henry; Cameron Joseph; Charlie Handsome; Carter Lang; Don Mills; Britten Newbill; Schyler O'Neal; Oz; Allen Ritter; Rowan; Enrique Sanchez; Marcus Semaj; Tim Suby; Jahaan Sweet; Leon Thomas; Sevn Thomas; YogiTheProducer

Giveon chronology
When It's All Said and Done... Take Time (2021)	Give or Take (2022)	Beloved (2025)

Singles from Give or Take
- 1. "For Tonight" Released: September 24, 2021; 2. "Lie Again" Released: April 29, 2022; 3. "Lost Me" Released: June 24, 2022

Give or Take is the debut studio album by the American singer-songwriter Giveon, released June 24, 2022, via Epic Records and Not So Fast. The album includes production from Cardo Got Wings, Boi-1da, Sevn Thomas, Jahaan Sweet, Rogét Chahayed, Don Mills, and Giveon himself, among others.

== Background ==
Give or Take, which serves as the follow-up to Giveon's extended plays Take Time (2020) and When It's All Said and Done (2020), is Giveon's first full-length project, released after two years in the making. The album explores themes such as fame, love, and heartbreak. The album is structured in the form of a series of discussions between Giveon and his mother, with dialogue interspersed between some of the album's tracks. "The album concept is just me having a conversation with my mom", Giveon explained in an interview. "I am finally expressing to her everything I've been through for the last 18 to 24 months. As if I'm reading right out of a diary, I told her that I want to have a conversation. I just wanted it to be her and myself", he gave as the reason as to why he chose to omit guest features from the album.

== Singles and music videos ==
The album was preceded by the singles "For Tonight" and "Lie Again", released September 24, 2021, and April 29, 2022, respectively, and with accompanying music videos released the same days. Third single "Lost Me" was released the same day as the album along with a music video.

== Style and reception ==
Give or Take ratings
Aggregate scores
Source	Rating
Metacritic	72/100
Review scores
Source	Rating
AllMusic	4/5 stars
The Line of Best Fit	8/10
Pitchfork	6.0/10

According to the review aggregator Metacritic, Give or Take received "generally favorable reviews" based on a weighted average score of 72 out of 100 from 6 critic scores. The Line of Best Fit's Josh Herring wrote that "the soothing nature of production is well complemented by beautiful baritone and reminiscent of an earlier form of R&B and soul music, one that is absent of traces of pop that riddles the genre contemporarily" and that "If you're looking for an authentic, soulful experience, then this is the album for you." The singles "For Tonight" and "Lie Again" are "stealing the show" and it "feels the album was geared to build up towards the higher-flying vocals of the lead singles and wind down into the latter half of the album" with an impressive vocal range on display. The album's "sonic range" is "limited", but "can still be a captivating experience – meaning, it doesn't necessarily have 'bangers', (Note: The dictionary definition of bangers at Wiktionary (see English language definition #6)) though that isn't to say this isn't a valuable listening experience."

Pitchfork's DeAsia Paige wrote that the album faced a similar issue to Giveon's 2020 cover of D'Angelo's consummate "Untitled (How Does It Feel)" which "has all the spiritual vigor of a partner who sends you a lengthy good morning text every day; it's just not that stimulating." The album's "expansive ballads seek to scale the highs and lows of love and heartbreak" but "Giveon more often sounds like he's cruising on autopilot in the center lane." Giveon "cautioned fans to keep a box of tissues nearby" in case they cried during their listening experience, but this is "not necessary". The album "paints a very familiar story of a hopeless romantic who's searching to understand their flaws and solve their relationship woes in the throes of newfound fame", but there's "no shortage of this narrative in contemporary R&B". Compared to rum.gold's Thicker Than Water and Lucky Daye's Painted, on which "the challenge of being a self-aware lover is illuminated with a lush variety of soul-baring vocal arrangements that would make love's most dedicated critics become open to understanding the possibilities of healthy romance", "Giveon's narrative doesn't land." Paige closes by noting that Take Time-era Giveon "experimented with melody and challenged himself vocally" while on Give or Take he "stunts that growth in favor of secluding himself in his comfort zone."

=== Year-end lists ===
Give or Take year-end lists
Publication	#	Ref.
Rolling Stone	78	

== Track listing ==
All tracks are written by Giveon Evans, with other writers noted.

Give or Take track listing
No.	Title	Writer(s)	Producers	Length
1.	"Let Me Go"	Jason Casanova; Ronald LaTour; Leon Thomas	Cardo Got Wings; Eye; L. Thomas^{[a]}	2:57
2.	"Scarred"	Johann Deterville; Peter Lee Johnson; Don Mills; Nils Noehden; Matthew Jehu Samuels; L. Thomas	Mills; Boi-1da; YogiTheProducer; L. Thomas^{[a]}; Nils^{[a]}	2:58
3.	"Dec 11th"	Matthew Burnett; Jordan Evans	Burnett; J. Evans	1:13
4.	"This Will Do"	Greyyforever; Johnson; Carlos Martin; Marcus Semaj; L. Thomas	Giveon; Greyyforever; Rowan	2:55
5.	"Get to You"	Simon Gebrelul; Mills; Noehden; Semaj; L. Thomas	Mills; Giveon; L. Thomas^{[a]}; Nils^{[a]}	3:26
6.	"Tryna Be"	Braxton Cook; Douglas Ford; Enrique Sanchez; Jahaan Sweet	Braxton; Sanchez; Sweet	2:51
7.	"Make You Mine"	Semaj; Rogét Chahayed; Sevn Thomas	Chahayed; S. Thomas	3:20
8.	"July 16th"	Caleb Bryant; Cameron Joseph; L. Thomas; Johnson	C. Bryant; Joseph; L. Thomas^{[a]}	1:51
9.	"For Tonight"	Tony Dixon; Johnson; Akeel Henry; Semaj; Sweet; L. Thomas; S. Thomas	Akeel Henry; Sweet; S. Thomas; L. Thomas ^{[a]}; Johnson^{[a]}	3:12
10.	"Lost Me"	Noehden; Dominik Patrzek; Semaj; L. Thomas; S. Thomas; Ryan Vojtesak; Ozan Yildirim	Charlie Handsome; Deats; Oz; S. Thomas; L. Thomas^{[a]}; Nils^{[a]}	3:01
11.	"Lie Again"	Gebrelul; Mills	Mills; Giveon	3:02
12.	"Another Heartbreak"	Johnson; Brooks Ivory Leonard; Schyler O'Neal; Sweet; L. Thomas	Brooks Ivory; Sweet; L. Thomas; O'Neal	4:09
13.	"At Least We Tried"	Trey Campbell; Britten Newbill	Newbill	3:33
14.	"Remind Me"	Campbell; Carter Lang; Sweet; Yildirim	Lang; Sweet; Oz	3:24
15.	"Unholy Matrimony"	Tyler Bryant; Anderson Hernandez; Mills; Allen Ritter; Samuels; Tim Suby	Ritter; Boi-1da; Mills; Suby; Vinylz^{[a]}	3:20
Total length:				45:12

=== Note ===
- ^{^[a]} signifies an additional producer

== Personnel ==
Credits adapted from Tidal.

- Giveon – vocals
- Brian Cruz – recording engineer
- Rodrigo Barahona – recording engineer (1, 2, 10–12)
- Andrew Schwartz – recording engineer (4)
- Sam Valentine Zuckerman – recording engineer (5, 6, 8)
- Robert N. Johnson – assistant engineer (1, 2, 4, 5, 8, 11, 12)
- Syd Tagle – assistant engineer (3, 7, 13, 14)
- Ian Rene – assistant engineer (6, 10)
- Jonathan Lopez Garcia – assistant engineer (6, 9)
- Brodie Means – assistant engineer (10)
- Josh Seller – assistant engineer (12)
- John Kercy – mixing engineer
- Colin Leonard – mastering engineer (1–5, 7–15)
- Nils – programming (5, 10)
- Peter Lee Johnson – programming (2, 4, 5, 12)
- Trisha Cruzada – programming (5, 14)
- Ayanna – programming (12)
- Syd – programming (12)
- Victor – programming (12)

== Charts ==
=== Weekly charts ===
Weekly chart performance for Give or Take
Chart (2022)	Peak position
Australian Albums (ARIA)	30
Belgian Albums (Ultratop Flanders)	100
Canadian Albums (Billboard)	15
Dutch Albums (Album Top 100)	36
New Zealand Albums (RMNZ)	19
Swiss Albums (Schweizer Hitparade)	31
UK Albums (Official Charts)	37
UK R&B Albums (Official Charts)	40
US Billboard 200	11
US Top R&B/Hip-Hop Albums (Billboard)	5

=== Year-end charts ===
2022 year-end chart performance for Give or Take
Chart (2022)	Position
US Billboard 200	186
US Top R&B/Hip-Hop Albums (Billboard)	84

== Certifications ==
Certifications for Give or Take
Region	Certification	Certified units/sales
Canada (Music Canada)	Gold	40,000^{‡}
New Zealand (RMNZ)	Gold	7,500^{‡}
United Kingdom (BPI)	Silver	60,000^{‡}
^{‡} Sales+streaming figures based on certification alone.

== Release history ==
Release dates and formats for Give or Take
Region	Date	Label(s)	Format(s)	Ref.
Various	June 24, 2022	Epic; Not So Fast	CD; cassette; digital download; streaming	
