= American Music Awards of 2021 =

Annual event

- Date: November 21, 2021
- Venue: Microsoft Theater, Los Angeles
- Country: United States
- Hosted by: Cardi B

Highlights
- Most wins: BTS; Doja Cat; Megan Thee Stallion (3 each)
- Most nominations: Olivia Rodrigo (7)
- Website: theamas.com

Television/radio coverage
- Network: ABC
- Produced by: Jesse Collins Entertainment; MRC Live & Alternative

The 49th Annual American Music Awards were held on November 21, 2021, at the Microsoft Theater in Los Angeles, recognizing the most popular artists, singles and albums of 2021. Cardi B hosted the ceremony, following Queen Latifah (1995) as the only female rappers in history to do so. Cardi B became the first artist to win Favorite Rap/Hip Hop Song three times. BTS, Doja Cat, and Megan Thee Stallion won three awards each.

The ceremony was notable as the first produced by MRC Live & Alternative, formerly known as Dick Clark Productions after use of the latter banner was phased out the month prior. However, this would be the only ceremony produced under the banner, as the Dick Clark Productions name was restored in August 2022.

== Performances ==
American Music Awards of 2021 performers
Artist(s)	Song(s)	Ref.
Silk Sonic	"Smokin Out the Window"	
Coldplay BTS	"My Universe"	
Olivia Rodrigo	"Traitor"	
Tyler, the Creator	"Massa"	
Jason Aldean Carrie Underwood^{[a]}	"If I Didn't Love You"	
Bad Bunny Tainy Julieta Venegas	"Lo Siento BB:/"	
Måneskin	"Beggin'"	
Chlöe	"Have Mercy"	
Jennifer Lopez	"On My Way"	
Mickey Guyton	"All American"	
Givēon	"Heartbreak Anniversary"	
Kane Brown^{[b]}	"One Mississippi"	
New Edition New Kids on the Block	Medley: "You Got It (The Right Stuff)" "Candy Girl" "Step by Step" "Mr. Telephone Man" "Is This the End"/"Please Don't Go Girl" "Can You Stand the Rain" "Hangin' Tough" "If It Isn't Love"	
Walker Hayes	"Fancy Like"	
Zoe Wees	"Girls Like Us"	
BTS^{[c]}	"Butter"	
Diplo	Musical Curator/DJ	

Notes

- ^{^[a]} Pre-recorded from Nashville, Tennessee
- ^{^[b]} Pre-recorded from Tennessee State University
- ^{^[c]} Megan Thee Stallion was originally planning to perform with BTS on "Butter", but pulled out "due to an unexpected personal matter".

== Presenters ==
Presenters were announced on November 19, 2021.

- Cardi B – main show host
- Billy Porter – presented Favorite Album – Latin
- Ansel Elgort & Rachel Zegler – presented Favorite Artist – Rock
- Cardi B – introduced Coldplay & BTS
- Michelle Young – introduced what was "coming up" in the show
- JoJo Siwa – presented Favorite Duo/Group – Pop
- Cardi B – introduced Olivia Rodrigo
- Diplo – introduced what was "coming up" in the show (multiple segments)
- Brandy – paid tribute to the victims of the Astroword Festival crowd crush & presented Favorite Album – Pop
- Cardi B – introduced Tyler The Creator
- Cardi B – introduced Bad Bunny, Tainy & Julieta Venegas
- Marsai Martin – presented Favorite Song – Hip-Hop
- Cardi B – introduced Måneskin
- D-Nice – introduced Chlöe
- JB Smoove – presented Favorite Song – Pop
- Cardi B – introduced Jennifer Lopez
- Cardi B – introduced Mickey Guyton
- Madelyn Cline – presented Favorite Trending Song
- Cardi B – introduced Giveon
- Liza Koshy – presented Artist of the Year
- Anthony Ramos – presented Favorite Female Artist – Latin
- Cardi B – introduced Walker Hayes
- Machine Gun Kelly – presented New Artist of the Year
- Winnie Harlow – introduced Zoe Wees
- Cardi B – introduced BTS

== Winners and nominees ==
The nominations were announced on ABC's Good Morning America, Spotify's morning show "The Get Up", and also via the American Music Awards Twitter account on October 28, 2021. Olivia Rodrigo received the most nominations with seven, followed by the Weeknd with six, and Bad Bunny, Doja Cat and Giveon with five each. BTS became the first Asian artist to receive Artist of the Year at the American Music Awards. Three new categories were introduced in 2021: Favorite Trending Song, Favorite Latin Duo or Group, and Favorite Gospel Artist.

Additionally, it was announced towards the end of October that though country singer Morgan Wallen had two nominations, due to his personal conduct in 2020 and 2021 which saw his music removed from further publicity and the suspension of his recording contract, he was not allowed to attend the ceremony or accept any awards won remotely. The show's production company plans to evaluate his future conduct in including him in future ceremonies.

Winners are listed first and highlighted in bold.

Artist of the Year	New Artist of the Year
**BTS**; Ariana Grande; Drake; Olivia Rodrigo; Taylor Swift; The Weeknd	**Olivia Rodrigo**; 24kGoldn; Giveon; Masked Wolf; The Kid Laroi
Favorite Music Video	Collaboration of the Year
**Lil Nas X – "Montero (Call Me By Your Name)"**; Silk Sonic (Bruno Mars, Anderson .Paak) – "Leave The Door Open"; Cardi B – "Up"; Olivia Rodrigo – "Drivers License"; The Weeknd – "Save Your Tears"	**Doja Cat featuring SZA – "Kiss Me More"**; 24kGoldn featuring Iann Dior – "Mood"; Bad Bunny and Jhay Cortez – "Dakiti"; Chris Brown and Young Thug – "Go Crazy"; Justin Bieber featuring Daniel Caesar and Giveon – "Peaches"
Favorite Male Artist – Pop	Favorite Female Artist – Pop
**Ed Sheeran**; Drake; Justin Bieber; Lil Nas X; The Weeknd	**Taylor Swift**; Ariana Grande; Doja Cat; Dua Lipa; Olivia Rodrigo
Favorite Male Artist – Hip-Hop	Favorite Female Artist – Hip-Hop
**Drake**; Lil Baby; Moneybagg Yo; Polo G; Pop Smoke	**Megan Thee Stallion**; Cardi B; Coi Leray; Erica Banks; Saweetie
Favorite Male Artist – Country	Favorite Female Artist – Country
**Luke Bryan**; Chris Stapleton; Jason Aldean; Luke Combs; Morgan Wallen	**Carrie Underwood**; Gabby Barrett; Kacey Musgraves; Maren Morris; Miranda Lambert
Favorite Male Artist – R&B	Favorite Female Artist – R&B
**The Weeknd**; Chris Brown; Giveon; Tank; Usher	**Doja Cat**; H.E.R.; Jazmine Sullivan; Jhené Aiko; SZA
Favorite Male Artist – Latin	Favorite Female Artist – Latin
**Bad Bunny**; J Balvin; Maluma; Ozuna; Rauw Alejandro	**Becky G**; Kali Uchis; Karol G; Natti Natasha; Rosalía
Favorite Artist – Rock	Favorite Artist – Electronic Dance Music
**Machine Gun Kelly**; AJR; All Time Low; Foo Fighters; Glass Animals	**Marshmello**; David Guetta; Illenium; Regard; Tiësto
Favorite Artist – Inspirational	Favorite Artist – Gospel
**Carrie Underwood**; Cain; Elevation Worship; Lauren Daigle; Zach Williams	**Kanye West**; Kirk Franklin; Koryn Hawthorne; Maverick City Music; Tasha Cobbs Leonard
Favorite Duo or Group – Pop	Favorite Duo or Group – Country
**BTS**; AJR; Glass Animals; Maroon 5; Silk Sonic (Bruno Mars, Anderson .Paak)	**Dan + Shay**; Florida Georgia Line; Lady A; Old Dominion; Zac Brown Band
Favorite Duo or Group – Latin	Favorite Trending Song
**Banda MS de Sergio Lizárraga**; Calibre 50; Eslabon Armado; La Arrolladora Banda El Limón De Rene Camacho; Los Dos Carnales	**Megan Thee Stallion – "Body"**; Erica Banks – "Buss It"; Måneskin – "Beggin'"; Olivia Rodrigo – "Drivers License"; Popp Hunna – "Adderall (Corvette Corvette)"
Favorite Song – Pop	Favorite Album – Pop
**BTS – "Butter"**; Doja Cat featuring SZA – "Kiss Me More"; Dua Lipa – "Levitating"; Olivia Rodrigo – "Drivers License"; The Weeknd and Ariana Grande – "Save Your Tears (Remix)"	**Taylor Swift – Evermore**; Ariana Grande – Positions; Dua Lipa – Future Nostalgia; Olivia Rodrigo – Sour; The Kid Laroi – F*ck Love
Favorite Song – Hip-Hop	Favorite Album – Hip-Hop
**Cardi B – "Up"**; Internet Money featuring Gunna, Don Toliver and Nav – "Lemonade"; Lil Tjay featuring 6lack – "Calling My Phone"; Polo G – "Rapstar"; Pop Smoke – "What You Know Bout Love"	**Megan Thee Stallion – Good News**; Drake – Certified Lover Boy; Juice Wrld – Legends Never Die; Pop Smoke – Shoot for the Stars, Aim for the Moon; Rod Wave – SoulFly
Favorite Song – Country	Favorite Album – Country
**Gabby Barrett – "The Good Ones**"; Chris Stapleton – "Starting Over"; Chris Young and Kane Brown – "Famous Friends"; Luke Combs – "Forever After All"; Walker Hayes – "Fancy Like"	**Gabby Barrett – Goldmine**; Chris Stapleton – Starting Over; Lee Brice – Hey World; Luke Bryan – Born Here Live Here Die Here; Morgan Wallen – Dangerous: The Double Album
Favorite Song – R&B	Favorite Album – R&B
**Silk Sonic (Bruno Mars, Anderson .Paak) – "Leave the Door Open"**; Chris Brown and Young Thug – "Go Crazy"; Giveon – "Heartbreak Anniversary"; H.E.R. – "Damage"; Jazmine Sullivan – "Pick Up Your Feelings"	**Doja Cat – Planet Her**; Giveon – When It's All Said and Done... Take Time; H.E.R. – Back of My Mind; Jazmine Sullivan – Heaux Tales; Queen Naija – Missunderstood
Favorite Song – Latin	Favorite Album – Latin
**Kali Uchis – "Telepatía"**; Bad Bunny and Jhay Cortez – "Dakiti"; Bad Bunny x Rosalía – "La Noche de Anoche"; Farruko – "Pepas"; Maluma and The Weeknd – "Hawái (Remix)"	**Bad Bunny – El Último Tour Del Mundo**; Kali Uchis – Sin Miedo (del Amor y Otros Demonios); Karol G – KG0516; Maluma – Papi Juancho; Rauw Alejandro – Afrodisíaco
