= Twenties (song) =

2025 single by Giveon

Single by Giveon

from the album Beloved
- Released: February 7, 2025
- Genre: Soul
- Length: 2:52
- Label: Epic; Not So Fast
- Songwriters: Giveon Evans; Matthew Burnett; Jahaan Sweet; Jeff Gitelman; Rupert Thomas, Jr.; Maneesh Bidaye
- Producers: Burnett; Sweet; Gitty; Sevn Thomas; Maneesh

Giveon singles chronology
"Are You Even Real" (2025)	"Twenties" (2025)	"Rather Be" (2025)

Music video
- "Twenties" on YouTube

Lyric video
- "Twenties (Official Lyric Video)" on YouTube

"Twenties" (stylized in all uppercase) is a song by American singer-songwriter Giveon, released on February 7, 2025 as the lead single for his 2025 album Beloved. The song is a soul ballad about mourning the wasted time spent on a relationship that lasted throughout one's twenties. The music video was released at the same time as the single, and features Giveon performing the song with a live band as he revisits memories from a past relationship. The song peaked at numbers 19 and 55 on the US Billboard Hot R&B/Hip-Hop Songs and Hot 100 charts.

== Background and composition ==
"Your twenties, that’s when you’re learning yourself, you’re learning what energizes you, what drains you, you learn even what you want to be in the future. But if you spend that time distracted by someone else or catering to them, you never even get to develop yourself. Later on, you have to start from scratch. The song is pretty much just an ode to that. I won’t say any names, but just to let them know, might have wasted this time.”

— Giveon to Rolling Stone, 2025.

Giveon's initial idea for "Twenties" was a "more romantic and poetic and heartfelt" song. He came up with the song from the perspective of a man who sees his single friends do what they want, but instead of choosing freedom he chooses to spend his "formative years" with the person he is in a relationship with. However, the song took a different turn once he reflected on his real life and realized he wasted his time with the person he was in a relationship with, and so he wanted to capture the feeling of "frustration and almost resentment". He changed the lyrics to be less specific to avoid hurting the feelings of the person it was about.

"Twenties" is a soul ballad with a vintage style about looking back on a past long-term relationship that lasted throughout one's twenties, and mourning the time spent on it. Danielle Chelosky of Stereogum described the song as Giveon "lingering on romantic regret." The production consists of bass, strings, choral arrangements, piano, an electric sitar, and drums. The track was the lead single to his 2025 album Beloved, and was released on February 7, 2025, before his 30th birthday on the 21st. Andy Kellman of AllMusic stated that the lyrics "Thought I was learning myself, I was just learning you / Is anything black and white when you're barely 22?" encapsulate the "slight disorientation and philosophical reasoning" that drives Beloved.

== Music video ==
After the "high-end production" for his last music video ("Lost Me"), Giveon wanted the "Twenties" video to be "cinematic and simple, not over produced, not over complicated" to avoid detracting from the song. After seeing Loris Russier's work, Giveon enlisted him as the director for the video. The music video for "Twenties", released simultaneously with the single, features Giveon performing with a live band, while "flashes of images from his past are projected onto the walls around them." Giveon revisits the moments from a relationship that he "believed would blossom into something more" through a "memory reel", "vignettes of memories of his ex."

== Critical reception ==
Zachary Horvath of HotNewHipHop described "Twenties" as a "a relatable track for both genders thanks to its ambiguous and expertly crafted lyrics" with "glimmering production to boot, making it that much more digestible."

== Charts ==
=== Weekly charts ===
Weekly chart performance for "Twenties"
Chart (2025)	Peak position
Canada (Canadian Hot 100)	57
Global 200 (Billboard)	79
Netherlands (Single Tip)	1
New Zealand (Recorded Music NZ)	33
Nigeria (TurnTable Top 100)	75
Philippines (Philippines Hot 100)	62
UK Singles (Official Charts)	61
US Billboard Hot 100	55
US Hot R&B/Hip-Hop Songs (Billboard)	19
US Rhythmic (Billboard)	21

=== Year-end charts ===
Year-end chart performance for "Twenties"
Chart (2025)	Position
US Hot R&B/Hip-Hop Songs (Billboard)	55

== Certifications ==
Certifications for "Twenties"
Region	Certification	Certified units/sales
Canada (Music Canada)	Gold	40,000^{‡}
^{‡} Sales+streaming figures based on certification alone.
