= For Tonight =

2021 single by Giveon

Single by Giveon

from the album Give or Take
- Released: September 24, 2021
- Genre: R&B
- Length: 3:13
- Label: Epic
- Songwriters: Giveon Evans; Rupert Thomas, Jr.; Marcus Semaj; Tony Dixon
- Producers: Sevn Thomas; Jahaan Sweet; Akeel Henry

Giveon singles chronology
"Peaches" (2021)	"For Tonight" (2021)	"Lie Again" (2022)

Music video
- "For Tonight" on YouTube

Lyric video
- "For Tonight (Official Lyric Video)" on YouTube

"For Tonight" is a song by American singer-songwriter Giveon. Released on September 24, 2021, it was the lead single for his debut studio album Give or Take (2022). The song is an R&B ballad about forbidden love. Giveon drew inspiration from the concept of a taboo relationship to something or someone, and sonically, a "classic timeless ballad with movement". Giveon left the song open to interpretation. Various interpretations of the song include a secret love affair and a short-lived passion in a precarious relationship. Critics received the song positively, praising the song's evocativeness. Its music video, released at the same time as the single, centers on moments between Giveon and his lover.

Giveon's performance of "For Tonight" on The Tonight Show Starring Jimmy Fallon, which took place on September 30, 2021, was described by Rolling Stone as soulful and emotive. Giveon sang the song at the 2022 BET Awards as part of a medley, during which a microphone malfunction caused him to sound off-key.

The song peaked at numbers 17 and 61 on the US Billboard Hot R&B/Hip-Hop Songs and Hot 100 charts. Internationally, the song peaked at number seven on the New Zealand Hot Singles chart, number 32 on the South Africa Streaming chart, number 78 on the Canadian Hot 100, and number 110 on the Global 200. On March 11, 2023, producer Akeel Henry won the Jack Richardson Producer of the Year Award at the Juno Awards of 2023 for his work on the song.

== Background, composition, and lyrics ==
Giveon's creative process for "For Tonight" began with coming up with the music to "set the canvas" and "paint the scene" before establishing a story, after which he "flushes [sic] it out with melodies" in the studio. The premise that inspired the song was, in Giveon's words, "the concept of having a taboo connection to something or someone". The last part of Giveon's process is writing the lyrics. Giveon's sonic inspiration for the song was a "classic timeless ballad with movement", which led to Sevn Thomas being chosen to add the drums above the "somber, kinda cinematic piano chords". "For Tonight" was the lead single to Giveon's debut studio album, Give or Take, and was released on September 24, 2021. It is set in A major with a chord progression of F♯m–D–A. Giveon's vocal range spans from A_{3} to C♯_{6}.

"For Tonight" is a longing, piano-led R&B ballad about forbidden love; Andy Kellman of AllMusic likened the track to the music of Sam Smith. Having learned before to leave things open to interpretation, Giveon wrote the song about a "taboo relationship" that could be about a person or a substance. He described the song as being "the story of a taboo vice that I just can’t seem to stop indulging in." Erika Marie of HotNewHipHop interpreted the lyrics as being about "enjoying the moment" with a special person even though the relationship has ended. Regina Cho of Revolt viewed them as recounting the happiness he gets from his time with a lover for one night.

Paul "Big Homie" Duong of Rap Radar saw the song as being about "brief intimacy in an unstable relationship." Ayana Regina of SoulBounce viewed the lyrics as Giveon's confession of his yearning for "one last moment of intimacy" with a secret lover before leaving the relationship behind ("For tonight, I'm yours / So deny the truth / We'll stay behind closed doors / 'Cause all I wanna do is lie with you / Even though it's wrong to lie with you"). Regina further stated that while he shows a little toxicity, he also expresses vulnerability by his admission: "But I just, I just don't wanna leave you / Might just, might just throw away the reasons / Why we both can't lay here".

== Reception ==
While DeAsia Paige of Pitchfork criticized most of Give or Take for Giveon's impassive delivery and limited range, she described "For Tonight" as the only song on the album where Giveon sounds believably in love, likening it to "My Heart Belongs to U" by Jodeci and "One Last Cry" by Brian McKnight, which are songs she used as examples of using one's voice skillfully to portray "falling head-over-heels in love". Tyler Schmitt of Variance described the song as "moving, absolutely intoxicating".

Commercially, "For Tonight" appeared on four singles charts in the United States. The song peaked at number 61 on the Billboard Hot 100 on the week of January 15, 2022. In addition, it peaked at number 12 on US Rhythmic on the week of January 29, number 17 on Hot R&B/Hip-Hop Songs on the week of January 8, and number 19 on Pop Airplay charts on the week of February 26. Internationally, the song peaked at number seven on the New Zealand Hot Singles chart, number 32 on the South Africa Streaming chart, number 78 on the Canadian Hot 100, and number 110 on the Global 200.

For the year-end chart performance of "For Tonight", the song ranked at number 47 on the US Rhythmic and number 57 on the Hot R&B/Hip-Hop Songs charts. On October 31, 2022, the song was certified Platinum for selling one million units by the Recording Industry Association of America (RIAA). Internationally, "For Tonight" is certified Silver for selling 200,000 units by the British Phonographic Industry (BPI), 2x Platinum for selling 160,000 units by Music Canada, and Platinum or selling 30,000 units by Recorded Music NZ (RMNZ).

== Music video ==
An accompanying video directed by Sophia Nahli Allison was released on the same day as the single. It centers on "private moments" between Giveon and his lover. The first half depicts them in separate scenes before they are shown walking toward one another. It subsequently shows scenes of the couple "having 'one of those conversations' on a rainy night, followed by clips of them lying together underneath the stars".

== Live performances ==
On September 30, 2021, Giveon sang the song on The Tonight Show Starring Jimmy Fallon in a performance described by Rolling Stone as soulful and emotive. It featured Giveon dressed in all black amid a set featuring windowpanes accompanied by mood lighting. Giveon later performed the song in a medley with "Heartbreak Anniversary" and "Lie Again" at the 2022 BET Awards, which took place on June 26, during which a microphone malfunction caused him to occasionally sound off-key.

== Awards ==
On March 11, 2023, producer Akeel Henry won the Jack Richardson Producer of the Year Award at the Juno Awards of 2023 for his work on "For Tonight" and John Legend's "Splash".

== Credits and personnel ==
Credits are adapted from Tidal.

- Giveon – composer, lyricist, lead vocals
- Akeel Henry – producer
- Jahaan Sweet – producer
- Sevn Thomas – producer, composer, lyricist
- Marcus Semaj – composer, lyricist
- Tony Dixon – composer, lyricist
- Jonathan Lopez Garcia – assistant engineer
- Brian Cruz – engineer, recording engineer
- Colin Leonard – mastering engineer
- Leon Thomas – miscellaneous producer
- Peter Lee Johnson – miscellaneous producer
- John Kercy – mix engineer

== Charts ==
=== Weekly charts ===
Weekly chart performance for "For Tonight"
Chart (2021–2022)	Peak position
Canada (Canadian Hot 100)	78
Global 200 (Billboard)	110
New Zealand Hot Singles (RMNZ)	7
South Africa Streaming (TOSAC)	32
US Billboard Hot 100	61
US Hot R&B/Hip-Hop Songs (Billboard)	17
US Pop Airplay (Billboard)	19
US Rhythmic (Billboard)	12

=== Year-end charts ===
2022 year-end chart performance for "For Tonight"
Chart (2022)	Position
US Hot R&B/Hip-Hop Songs (Billboard)	57
US Rhythmic (Billboard)	47

== Certifications ==
Certifications for "For Tonight"
Region	Certification	Certified units/sales
Canada (Music Canada)	2× Platinum	160,000^{‡}
New Zealand (RMNZ)	Platinum	30,000^{‡}
United Kingdom (BPI)	Silver	200,000^{‡}
United States (RIAA)	Platinum	1,000,000^{‡}
^{‡} Sales+streaming figures based on certification alone.

== Release history ==
Release history for "For Tonight"
Region	Date	Format	Label	Ref.
Various	September 24, 2021	Digital download; streaming	Epic	
United States	September 28, 2021	Rhythmic contemporary	Epic	
Italy	December 17, 2021	Contemporary hit radio	Sony	
