= Akeel Henry =

Canadian record producer, songwriter, and recording engineer

Akeel Oliver Henry
- Born: Toronto, Ontario, Canada
- Other name: Akeel
- Education: Metalworks Institute
- Musical career
- Genres: R&B; soul; pop
- Occupations: Producer; songwriter; multi-instrumentalist
- Label: LaFace

Akeel Henry is a Canadian record producer and recording engineer. He was the winner of the Jack Richardson Producer of the Year Award at the Juno Awards of 2023 for various musical contributions including Giveon's "For Tonight" and John Legend's "Splash".

He was previously nominated in the same category at the Juno Awards of 2021 for "Rain" (Trey Songz feat. Swae Lee) and "Spell My Name" (Toni Braxton), among other musical contributions that year.

== Career beginnings ==
Henry grew up in Toronto alongside fellow producers Jack Rochon and Aaron Paris. In 2014, he graduated from Mississauga's Metalworks Institute with a diploma in Audio Production & Engineering. During his time at the institution, he secured an internship at Toronto’s Phase One Studios, followed by a coveted internship opportunity at OVO Sound with Drake’s producer, Noah ‘40’ Shebib.

== Personal life ==
Born in Toronto, Canada, Henry is of Jamaican descent.

== Selected songwriting and production credits ==
Credits are courtesy of Discogs, Tidal, Apple Music, and AllMusic.

Title	Year	Artist	Album
"Keep Calm"	2017	Dvsn	Morning After
"Don't Get Much Better" (with Jeremih & Sage the Gemini)	2017	Ty Dolla Sign	The Fate of the Furious (soundtrack)
"Spell My Name"	2020	Toni Braxton	Spell My Name
"Rain" (featuring Swae Lee)	2020	Trey Songz	Back Home
"For Tonight"	2021	Giveon	Give or Take
"Hurt Me So Good"	2021	Jazmine Sullivan	Heaux Tales, Mo' Tales
"Splash" (featuring Ty Dolla Sign & Jhené Aiko)	2022	John Legend	Legend
"Rent Money" (featuring Dave East)	2022	Mary J. Blige	Good Morning Gorgeous
"Gravity"	2023	Sean Leon	In Loving Memory
"Just Like Me" (with Burna Boy & Metro Boomin)	2024	21 Savage	American Dream
"Rose"	2024	Chlöe	Trouble in Paradise
"Same Lingerie"	2024	Chlöe	Trouble in Paradise
"Shake" (featuring Jeremih)	2024	Chlöe	Trouble in Paradise
"Spin" (featuring Victoria Monét)	2024	Megan Thee Stallion	Megan
"Love or Something Like It" (featuring Lucky Daye)	2026	Halle Bailey	Love?... or Something Like It (Deluxe Edition)

== Awards and nominations ==
Year	Ceremony	Award	Result	Ref
2021	Juno Awards	Jack Richardson Producer of the Year Award	Nominated	
2023	65th Annual Grammy Awards	Best R&B Song ("Hurt Me So Good")	Nominated	
2023	65th Annual Grammy Awards	Grammy Award for Album of the Year (Good Morning Gorgeous)	Nominated	
2023	Juno Awards	Jack Richardson Producer of the Year Award	Won	
2025	Juno Awards	Jack Richardson Producer of the Year Award	Nominated	
