= Popp Hunna =

American rapper (born 2000)

- Born: Omir Bernard; October 21, 2000 (age 25); Philadelphia, Pennsylvania, U.S.
- Genres: Hip hop; trap
- Occupations: Rapper; songwriter
- Years active: 2017–present

Omir Bernard (born October 21, 2000), known professionally as Popp Hunna, is an American rapper and songwriter from Philadelphia. Omir is best known for his songs "Single", "Adderall (Corvette Corvette)", and the latter's remix with rapper Lil Uzi Vert, a song that peaked at number 84 on the Billboard Hot 100. His rise to fame is often credited to his music's popularity on the social media platform TikTok.

== Career ==
At the age of 17 years old, Popp Hunna made a song in which he discusses a breakup with a then-girlfriend. The feedback he received on the song helped him gain confidence in his music-making abilities. In January 2020, he released his 12-track EP One Year Later which he promoted on social media platform TikTok. His track "Single" from the EP received traction and marked his first hit. In October 2020, he released his song "Adderall (Corvette Corvette)" following the release with a dance challenge on the platform TikTok. As of February 2021, there were 26 million videos on the social media platform using the song. In December 2020, he released the remix to his song "Adderall (Corvette Corvette)" with American rapper Lil Uzi Vert. Also in December 2020, he released his EP Mud Baby with appearances from rappers Lil Uzi Vert, Toosii, and Petty Level. In January 2022, he released his single "Back It Up" in which he references his hit single "Adderall (Corvette Corvette)".

== Personal life and controversies ==
=== Snitching allegations ===
On 28 December 2020, following the release of alleged paperwork, rumors started circulating that Popp Hunna told information to the police after witnessing a murder at the age of 14. The paperwork alleged that in 2015, Popp Hunna provided authorities with information surrounding the murder of a classmate of which he and his mother were witnesses. The rumors allegedly prompted American rapper Lil Uzi Vert to tell the rapper to remove him from his latest EP via direct message on Instagram. Following the alleged action by Lil Uzi Vert, American rapper Trippie Redd expressed his discontent towards Popp Hunna commenting "Salute @liluzivert you did wtf you was suppose to do ! I didn’t snitch at 12 yrs old so ain’t no justification to him snitching at 14 #FuckThat" on his Twitter account and showing his support to Lil Uzi Vert's alleged reaction. American rapper Lil Tjay also shared his discontent towards Popp Hunna's alleged actions and commented on his Instagram account that his age was not an excuse. On 29 December 2020, Popp Hunna reacted to the rumors by attacking the validity of the paperwork and seemingly calling it fake in an Instagram post. In January 2022, Popp Hunna appeared on DJ Akademiks' podcast Off the Record and expressed his feelings on the situation, confronting the reaction by American rappers Lil Uzi Vert and Trippie Redd.

=== Mental health ===
In August 2021, Popp Hunna appeared in an Instagram live, visibly distraught, seemingly commenting on an argument he had with his father and alleging that his father told him that he wished he was no longer alive. Popp Hunna later wrote on his Instagram story: "20 years old with no purpose in life, Allah call me home. I'm ready. I gave it my all.", which was interpreted as suicidal feelings. His management team later released a statement regarding the situation which reads: “In regards to yesterday’s live we are asking for prayers and positivity right now for Pop Hunna. If you have someone you love and care for who is dealing with suicidal thoughts don’t overlook it get them help immediately!!! MGMT.”

== Personal life ==
=== 2025 arrest ===
In 2025, Popp Hunna was reported to have been arrested in Montgomery County, Pennsylvania, in connection with a shooting that allegedly occurred on December 23. According to reports, he faced multiple charges, including aggravated assault (attempt to cause serious bodily injury/causing injury with extreme indifference), possession of a firearm prohibited, firearms not to be carried without a license, possession of instruments of crime, and recklessly endangering another person. Bail was reportedly set at $100,000, with a 10% bond option. Details surrounding the incident remain limited, and the case was ongoing as of early 2026.

== Discography ==
=== Mixtapes ===
Title	Mixtape details
One Year Later	Released: January 17, 2020; Label: Self-released; Format: Digital download, streaming
Mud Baby	Released: December 25, 2020; Label: Self-released; Format: Digital download, streaming

=== Charted singles ===
Title	Year	Peak chart positions				Album
Title	Year	US	CAN	IRE	UK	Album
"Adderall (Corvette Corvette)" (solo or remix featuring Lil Uzi Vert)	2020	74	71	83	92	Mud Baby

== Awards and nominations ==
Awards and nominations for Popp Hunna
Year	Ceremony	Category	Work	Result	Ref.
2021	American Music Awards of 2021	Favorite Trending Song	Adderall (Corvette Corvette)	Nominated	
