= Rather Be (Giveon song) =

2025 single by Giveon

Single by Giveon

from the album Beloved
- Released: May 16, 2025
- Studio: Westlake (Los Angeles)
- Genre: Soul
- Length: 2:51
- Label: Epic; Not So Fast
- Songwriters: Giveon Evans; Rupert Thomas Jr.; Marcus Semaj; Deavon Petty Chisolm; Ari PenSmith; Matthew Burnett; Maneesh Bidaye; Jeff Gitelman; Jahaan Sweet
- Producers: Sevn Thomas; Maneesh Bidaye; Matthew Burnett; Gitty; Jahaan Sweet

Giveon singles chronology
"Twenties" (2025)	"Rather Be" (2025)	"I Can Tell" (2025)

Music video
- "Rather Be" on YouTube

"Rather Be" (stylized in all uppercase) is a song by American singer and songwriter Giveon. Released on May 16, 2025 as the second single to Beloved, an album in which Giveon drew from 1970s rhythm and blues, "Rather Be" is a soul ballad with vintage production in which Giveon chooses to remain with a past lover who is flawed than to start anew with another person. Writers for Esquire and AllMusic stated that the track evokes Al Green, Philadelphia soul, and Memphis soul. A music video directed by Loris Russier was released at the same time as the single, and it centered on Giveon's relationship with a woman amid an architectural backdrop. The song peaked at numbers 30 and 10 on the US Billboard Hot R&B/Hip-Hop Songs and Bubbling Under Hot 100 charts. Internationally, it peaked at number 8 on the New Zealand RMNZ Hot Singles Chart.

== Background and composition ==
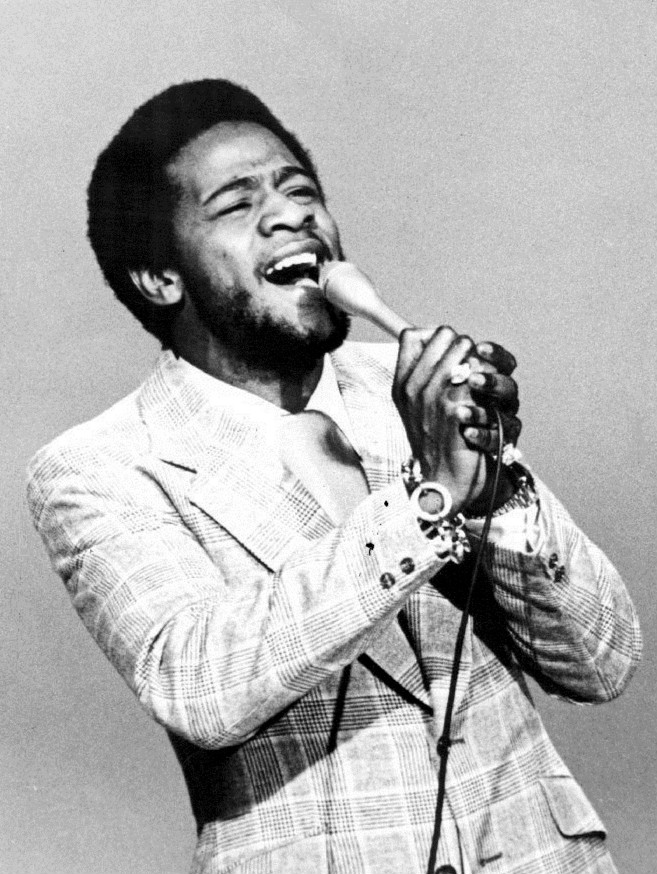
"Rather Be" evokes Al Green (pictured above) and Philadelphia soul.

For his sophomore album Beloved, which consists of tracks that draw from 1970s rhythm and blues, Giveon intended to convey his position sonically as an artist and the time he built on his craft. The second single from the album, "Rather Be", is a "vintage soul" ballad, having "lush instrumentation" and "good, old-fashioned begging"; Andy Kellman of AllMusic described the track as "very Memphian". Accompanied by "Al Green-style horns" and "Philly Soul strings", Giveon sings about preferring to remain a fool with the one he loves than to begin anew with some other person, believing that no one else can come close to what he had. Giveon described the song as a "reflection of acceptance", conveying the thought of choosing to stay with someone despite their flaws and loving them for who they are and "realizing that real connection isn’t about starting over, it’s about holding on." Kandice Bell of ThisisRnB.com stated that the song's brass syncopation and chords evoke Green's "Let's Stay Together".

== Critical reception ==
Alan Light of Esquire, in the magazine's 17 Best Songs of 2025 (So Far) list, stated that despite the song's vintage production, Giveon's baritone voice prevents it from seeming "dusty or lazily retro", mentioning Giveon's "classic-meets-modern sensibility". Andrea Dee of PULP Magazine described the song as a "heartfelt expression that feels truly raw and vulnerable."

== Music video ==
The music video was released simultaneously with the song. It was directed by Loris Russier, and centers on Giveon's relationship with a woman amid a backdrop consisting of "symmetrical architecture and flat planes". Aaron Williams of Uproxx stated that its "clean-cut, cosmopolitan aesthetic" evokes the work of Solange Knowles, with Giveon and his band "in balanced compositions around an architectural marvel."

== Live performances ==
Giveon performed the song as part of his 2025 Tiny Desk Concerts performance. "Rather Be" was also part of his Dear Beloved Tour setlist.

== Credits and personnel ==
Credits are adapted from the liner notes of Beloved. The song was recorded at Westlake Studios (Los Angeles, California).

- Giveon Evans, Rupert Thomas Jr., Marcus Semaj, Deavon Petty Chisolm, Ari PenSmith, Matthew Burnett, Maneesh Bidaye, Jeff Gitelman, and Jahaan Sweet – songwriting
- Sevn Thomas, Maneesh Bidaye, Matthew Burnett, Gitty, Jahaan Sweet – production
- Brian Cruz and Sevn Thomas – vocal production
- Brian Cruz and Hayden Duncan – engineering
- Terena Dawn, Garret Duncan, Collin Clark, and Ivan Marcelo – assistant engineering
- Peter Lee Johnson – strings
- Kemy Siala – bass
- Jeff "Gitty" Gitelman – guitar
- Kyla Moscovich – horns
- Elena Pinderhughes – flutes
- Cory Henry – organ
- Matthew Burnett – drums and additional percussion
- Jacob Scesney – saxophone
- Sevn Thomas – programmed drums
- Jahaan Sweet and Maneesh Bidaye – keys
- Jahaan Sweet – piano
- Absolutely – background vocals, additional vocal arrangements

== Charts ==
=== Weekly charts ===
Chart (2025)	Peak position
New Zealand Hot Singles (RMNZ)	8
US Bubbling Under Hot 100 (Billboard)	10
US Hot R&B/Hip-Hop Songs (Billboard)	30
