= Adderall (Corvette Corvette) =

2020 single by Popp Hunna

Single by Popp Hunna

from the album Mud Baby
- Released: October 15, 2020
- Length: 2:16
- Label: Jay Rebel
- Songwriters: Omir Bernard; Albert Castillo; Cooper Vengrove; William Repko; Danny Snodgrass Jr.
- Producers: Bert Beatz; Cooper Vengrove

Popp Hunna singles chronology
"Single" (2019)	"Adderall (Corvette Corvette)" (2020)	"Take Off" (2020)

Music video
- "Adderall (Corvette Corvette)" on YouTube
- "Adderall (Corvette Corvette) Remix" on YouTube

Remix cover
- Cover art of the official remix featuring Lil Uzi Vert.

"Adderall (Corvette Corvette)" is a song by American rapper Popp Hunna, released on October 15, 2020. It went viral on the video-sharing platform TikTok and is considered his breakout hit. An official remix of the song featuring American rapper Lil Uzi Vert was released on December 18, 2020 as the lead single from Popp Hunna's mixtape Mud Baby (2020).

== Release and promotion ==
The single was released on October 15, 2020, after which it soon gained recognition through TikTok, with a dance challenge using the song growing popular. It became the signature celebration song of NFL wide receiver JuJu Smith-Schuster; celebrities who also danced to the song on TikTok include comedian Kevin Hart, Sasha Obama (daughter of former U.S. President Barack Obama) and social media personality Jayda Wayda.

In December 2020, Popp Hunna broke down the lyrics of the song on Genius's Verified, where he also said:

I just want to tell everybody out there, do not take Adderall if you do not need it. I'm not trying to, you know, like promote it for, you know, anybody that just like, just wants to take it for fun. Like it's not, you know, for fun. It's for people who actually, you know, might need it, you know, to work or concentrate. Make sure you get your prescription from a doctor.

== Remix ==
The official remix features Lil Uzi Vert and was released on December 18, 2020. It was teased on social media in the days before release, and accompanied with a music video directed by Drew Filmed It, which sees Popp Hunna and Lil Uzi Vert with a fleet of Chevrolet Corvettes in the streets.

== Charts ==
Chart performance for "Adderall (Corvette Corvette)"
Chart (2021)	Peak position
Canada (Canadian Hot 100)	71
Global 200 (Billboard)	137
Ireland (IRMA)	83
UK Singles (OCC)	92
US Billboard Hot 100	74
US Hot R&B/Hip Hop Songs (Billboard)	21

== Awards and nominations ==
Awards	Year	Category	Result	Ref.
American Music Awards of 2021	2021	Favorite Trending Song	Nominated	
