= Beloved (Giveon album) =

Studio album by Giveon
- Released: July 11, 2025
- Recorded: July 2022 – May 2025
- Genres: R&B; soul
- Labels: Epic; Not So Fast
- Producers: Beat Butcha; Matthew Burnett; Cashmere Cat; Ging; Gitty; Robert Gueringer; Jasper Harris; Peter Lee Johnson; Los Hendrix; Maneesh; NinetyFour; Aaron Paris; David Phelps; Rowan; Siala; Jahaan Sweet; Sevn Thomas

Giveon chronology
Give or Take (2022)	Beloved (2025)

Singles from Beloved
- 1. "Twenties" Released: February 7, 2025; 2. "Rather Be" Released: May 16, 2025; 3. "I Can Tell" Released: July 11, 2025

Singles from Beloved: Act II
- 1. "Jezebel" Released: May 15, 2026

Beloved (stylized in all uppercase) is the second studio album by American singer-songwriter Giveon. Released through Epic Records and Not So Fast on July 11, 2025, production was handled by a variety of record producers, including Matthew Burnett, Jahaan Sweet, Gitty, Sevn Thomas, and Maneesh. Recorded with a live band, Beloved draws from 1970s rhythm and blues and soul music, and the music evokes Al Green, Isaac Hayes, The Delfonics, and Philadelphia soul. With Beloved, Giveon intended to convey where he is as an artist sonically and the time he built on his craft, and to add to the Black American male perspectives on relationships in music. An autobiographical album, the album tells a raw and realistic love story inspired by multiple relationships Giveon had. It was preceded by two singles, "Twenties" and "Rather Be". It debuted and peaked at number eight on the Billboard 200 and at number four on the Billboard Top R&B/Hip-Hop Albums chart, and received positive reviews. Rolling Stone and Variety ranked the album number 57 and nine on their Best Albums of 2025 lists. The album was nominated at the 68th Annual Grammy Awards for Best R&B Album and the 57th NAACP Image Awards for Outstanding Album.

The album was promoted with Dear Beloved, The Tour, which ran internationally from October 2025 to March 2026. On May 15, 2026, Giveon released a deluxe version of the album subtitled Act II which includes five additional tracks with features from Kehlani, Leon Thomas, Sasha Keable, and Teddy Swims. Simultaneously, the groovy, energetic opener titled "Jezebel" was released as a single with a music video.

== Background and recording ==
For his sophomore album Beloved, Giveon wanted to convey his position sonically as an artist and the three years he worked to build on his craft. He also wanted to add to the male point of view in rhythm and blues, as he viewed that while the genre has predominant perspectives from women, "seeing love through the male lens can get lost now", further specifying that a Black American male perspective on relationships is lacking across any genre. Wanting to keep the rawness and authenticity, Giveon created the album as a realistic love story, which he stated is far from how a fairy tale would go. The album is autobiographical, and was inspired by multiple relationships he had, such as with singer Justine Skye.

In the album's recording, Giveon used the same group of instrumentalists for every song to ensure its cohesiveness.

== Composition ==
"This is the record I always wanted to make. Earlier, I wasn’t ready, so I decided I’d rather just wait until I evolve, especially knowing that there’s no one else in this space right now. I might end up being the face of this contemporary soul thing, so I don’t want to do it halfway. I do have this nostalgic side to me, but I’m still a very modern guy."

— Giveon to Variety, 2025.

Beloved channels 1970s rhythm and blues and soul music. Rolling Stone and Variety noted that the album's sound is influenced by Philadelphia soul, such as Teddy Pendergrass, The Delfonics, and "TSOP (The Sound of Philadelphia)", and also by Al Green, Isaac Hayes, and Marvin Gaye. Giveon named the album from a term that he stated captures the "warm and classic and '70s inspired and soulful" feel of the music, "beloved", which was what he heard his grandfather call his grandmother.

=== Songs ===
The album opens with "Mud", which starts with a symphony before transitioning to a "smooth beginning" that evokes Teddy Pendergrass. As someone who refers to movies frequently, Giveon intended the beginning to consist of "heavy drums and powerful strings" to draw the listener in and to evoke the feeling of a film's big opening scene before it rewinds to tell how the story led up to that sequence. Lyrically, it centers on a confrontation with an ex who smeared his name and characterized him as the antagonist in their relationship. "Rather Be" is a soul ballad with vintage production about Giveon preferring to remain a fool with a past lover than to begin anew with some other person, believing that no one else can come close to what he had. The song's instrumentation evokes Al Green, Philadelphia soul, and Memphis soul. The next song, "Twenties", is another soul ballad with vintage production, in which Giveon sings of mourning the time spent on a past relationship that lasted throughout his twenties, accompanied by instrumentation consisting of bass, strings, choral arrangements, piano, an electric sitar, and drums. Giveon sings "Thought I was learning myself, I was just learning you / Is anything black and white when you're barely 22?", encapsulating the "slight disorientation and philosophical reasoning" that drives the album. "Strangers" comes next, and was the first track made for the album, after which Giveon realized the album's direction. In "Strangers", a defeated Giveon learns that his ex is now in a relationship with another, proclaiming "Yes, I'm taking this hard" through a "pained, zigzag" riff, and by the next song, the Delfonics-inspired "Numb", Giveon recounts his inability to feel, admitting "I’ve been here before" over "angelic background coos". "I Can Tell" is a more hopeful track where Giveon makes his case as a better option for a woman who shows signs that she is unhappy with her present lover.

"Diamonds For Your Pain" and "Keeper" lyrically center on Giveon "slyly working his way out of the doghouse". The former is the shortest track on the album, being an interlude, and it focuses on Giveon's attempt at some accountability by being aware of the turbulence he created, but instead of finding real solutions, he gifts her materialistic things such as jewelry. It starts with staccato strings that build up, as Giveon intended it to feel "cinematic and big". Giveon aimed to conceal the topic of its lyrics through pretty-sounding music. In "Backup Plan", an anxious Giveon takes the emotional distance from his lover as evidence of him being replaced, and he watches as she contemplates departure. Andy Kellman of AllMusic described the track as a "smudged, extended, and downcast coda to Isaac Hayes' version of 'The Look of Love'". In "Bleeding", Giveon questions his relationship's future, hurt by his lover's fixation on her ex. "Avalanche", a track that depicts "a moment before it went sour", features groovy production and is "sung from a place of promise and not repair". Giveon delusionally states with naivete, "Intuition says we’re way too young to start a family / But I’ve been thinking about forever, my dear", in a dense mix that hints at a "looming threat". Giveon ends the album with a track about a couple dedicated to together overcoming conflict in "Good Bad Ugly", as he sings, "I'll even let you run me down to the ground / Watching you while you run your mouth / I stick around / I love you ’cause you love me / Through the good, bad, and ugly".

== Release and promotion ==
External videos
- The album trailer for Beloved.
- The music video for "I Can Tell".

The lead single of the album, "Twenties", was released on February 7, 2025. In an interview with Billboard on March 28, 2025, Giveon said that he is "excited for people to hear" his next album and feels that he has "a responsibility with this music because I see how it touches and helps people". The second single, "Rather Be", was released on May 16, 2025. Giveon announced the album sixteen days later along with its cover art and release date, revealing that he spent over one thousand days recording it. On July 1, 2025, he revealed the official tracklist through a letter similar to a "breakup note", with each song title in all caps and embedded within "emotional reflections" which offer a glimpse into the album's themes. The album was released on July 11, 2025; at the same time, Giveon released "I Can Tell" as a single with a music video. Directed by Sahra Zadat, the 1970s-inspired video opens with a classic cinematic trope: a "train station farewell" between Giveon and his lover.

=== Touring ===
On July 10, 2025, Giveon told Rolling Stone how the album, which was created live, was meant to be performed live, and described his upcoming tour as his best. He expressed his wish to do "a full eight to 10 piece [backing band]" depending on the stages' sizes and for the night to feel like a movie like his album.

On July 22, 2025, Giveon announced "Dear Beloved, The Tour". The North American leg ran from October 1, 2025 (Seattle) to November 6, 2025 (New York City), with Free Nationals, Charlotte Day Wilson, and Sasha Keable as opening acts. The Australian, Asian, and European legs of the tour were announced subsequently, and ran from January 18 to March 26, 2026.

=== Deluxe reissue: Act II ===
"I think the idea of the deluxe, too, is that I wanted to play with different tempos and different textures. People have heard me on tempos before, but not like “Jezebel,” so I just wanted to expand my sound."

— Giveon to Ebony, 2026.

External media

Images
- The cover artwork for Beloved: Act II.

Video
- The teaser for Act II.
- The music video for "Jezebel".

On April 10, 2026, Giveon announced a deluxe version of the album, subtitled Act II, through a teaser that depicts a woman named Jezebel leaving Giveon voicemails. It was released on May 15, 2026, and included five new songs with features from Kehlani, Leon Thomas, Sasha Keable, and Teddy Swims. Uptempo album opener "Jezebel" was released simultaneously as a single with a music video directed by Loris Russier. "Jezebel" is a track with a groovy, "more energetic, almost pop-inspired sound"; Rated R&B called it a descendant of The Gap Band's "Outstanding" and Frankie Beverly's "We Are One". Both Rated R&B and HotNewHipHop described the track as a standout. In "Save Some For Me" featuring Kehlani, the two plead with a love interest to "give them the chance to love them the way they deserve." Tallie Spencer of HotNewHipHop stated that the deluxe "continues the strong chemistry Giveon has built with collaborators throughout the BELOVED era, with each feature blending naturally into the project's warm and cinematic R&B sound."

Giveon described the standard version, which he labeled as Act I, as a conversation with himself or with a romantic interest, and described Act II as "a conversation with friends now about the situation" and "more communal".

== Critical reception ==
Professional ratings
Review scores
Source	Rating
AllMusic	4/5 stars
Rolling Stone	4/5 stars

Beloved received positive reviews from music critics. AllMusic's Andy Kellman wrote that the album "is filled with many other dramatic, tear-stained expressions of regret, frustration, and heartache" and that although it isn't "an out-and-out throwback, it draws substantially from the '70s", comparing the record to Philadelphia soul music, the music released by Hi Records, and "less so from maestros such as Barry White and Isaac Hayes". He concluded that "Giveon might view his six-year relationship as misspent, but there's no second-guessing the time he devoted to converting it into art". Writing for Rolling Stone, Mankaprr Conteh wrote that Beloved is "almost barren of the hip-hop flourishes that peppered his earlier work" and that Giveon "instead leans all the way into the orchestral R&B of another time, lush with searing strings and the crash of real hi-hats". Similarly to Kellman, Conteh wrote that "Beloved feels indebted to Al Green, Philly soul, The Jackson 5, and Blaxploitation soundtracks". Conteh continued that "Giveon offers a stunning, panoramic view of romantic relationships in their toughest places" and that the album particularly shines when Giveon "embraces how complicated heartache can be". Jem Aswad of Variety stated that Beloved accomplished the rare feat of accurately recreating the sound of a certain period or genre and bringing it to the present. Rated R&B's Keithan Samuels wrote that the album "is an ode to classic soul from the ’70s, with its lush instrumentation — cinematic strings, regal horns, stirring bass and warm drums — paired with emotive storytelling."

Rolling Stone ranked number 57 on their Best Albums of 2025 list, while a critic from Variety ranked it number 9. Rated R&B placed the album at number five for their 25 Best R&B Albums of 2025 list.

== Award nominations ==
List of nominations received by Beloved
Year	Award	Category	Result	Ref.
2026	Grammy Awards	Best R&B Album	Nominated	
2026	NAACP Image Awards	Outstanding Album	Nominated	

== Commercial performance ==
Beloved debuted at number eight on the Billboard 200 chart, earning 44,000 album-equivalent units (including 8,000 in pure album sales) in its first week. The album also accumulated a total of 47.78 million on-demand streams of the album's songs.

== Track listing ==
Beloved track listing
No.	Title	Writer(s)	Producer(s)	Length
1.	"Mud"	Giveon Evans; Leon Thomas III; Lazaro Camejo; Melvin Moore; Rupert Thomas Jr.; Matthew Burnett; Peter Lee Johnson; Aaron Cheung	Sevn Thomas; Burnett; Johnson; Aaron Paris; Brian Cruz^{[v]}	2:13
2.	"Rather Be"	Evans; Ariowa Irosogie; Marcus James; Deavon Chisolm; R. Thomas; Matthew Burnett; Jeff Gitelman; Jahaan Sweet; Maneesh Bidaye	Sevn Thomas^{[p]}; Burnett; Gitty; Sweet; Maneesh; Cruz^{[v]}	2:51
3.	"Twenties"	Evans; Sarah Aarons; Chisolm; R. Thomas; Burnett; Gitelman; Sweet; Bidaye	Sevn Thomas^{[p]}; Burnett; Gitty; Sweet; Maneesh; Kuk Harrell^{[v]}	2:51
4.	"Strangers"	Evans; Irosogie; Chisolm; R. Thomas; Sweet; Eliot Dubock; Eric Dugar; David Phelps	Sevn Thomas; Sweet; Beat Butcha; NinetyFour; Phelps; Burnett; Cruz^{[v]}	3:33
5.	"Numb"	Evans; Aarons; R. Thomas; Burnett; Gitelman; Sweet; Johnson	Sevn Thomas; Burnett; Gitty; Sweet; Johnson; Cruz^{[v]}; Troy Taylor^{[v]}	3:18
6.	"I Can Tell"	Evans; James Essien; R. Thomas; Burnett; Gitelman; Sweet; Carlos Muñoz; Kenny Siala	Sevn Thomas^{[p]}; Burnett; Gitty; Sweet; Los Hendrix; Siala; Cory Henry^{[m]}; Cruz^{[v]}	3:15
7.	"Diamonds for Your Pain"	Evans; R. Thomas; Sweet; Johnson	Sevn Thomas; Sweet; Johnson; Cruz^{[v]}	1:28
8.	"Keeper"	Evans; Essien; R. Thomas; Burnett; Gitelman; Sweet	Sevn Thomas; Burnett; Gitty; Sweet; Cruz^{[v]}; Taylor^{[v]}	3:42
9.	"Six:Thirty"	Evans; Adam Feeney	Ging	0:32
10.	"Backup Plan"	Evans; R. Thomas; Gitelman; Bidaye	Sevn Thomas; Gitty; Maneesh; Burnett; Cruz^{[v]}	3:10
11.	"Bleeding"	Evans; Irosogie; Chisolm; Magnus Høiberg; Jasper Harris; Carlos Martin	Cashmere Cat; Harris; Rowan; Sevn Thomas; Cruz^{[v]}	2:57
12.	"Don't Leave"	Evans; L. Thomas; Irosogie; Chisolm; R. Thomas; Johnson	Sevn Thomas^{[p]}; Johnson; Burnett; Cruz^{[v]}	3:28
13.	"Avalanche"	Evans; Chisolm; R. Thomas; Burnett; Gitelman; Bidaye	Sevn Thomas; Burnett; Gitty; Maneesh; Cruz^{[v]}	2:30
14.	"Good Bad Ugly"	Evans; L. Thomas; Jason Boyd; Essien; R. Thomas; Phelps; Gueringer; Martin	Sevn Thomas; Phelps; Gueringer; Rowan; Cruz^{[v]}	3:08

Beloved: Act II additional tracks
No.	Title	Length
1.	"Jezebel"
2.	"Save Some for Me" (featuring Kehlani)
3.	"Fool Me Once" (featuring Leon Thomas)
4.	"Replica" (featuring Sasha Keable)
5.	"Keeper" (featuring Teddy Swims)

=== Notes ===
- ^{^[p]} signifies a primary and vocal producer
- ^{^[v]} signifies a vocal producer
- ^{^[m]} signifies a miscellaneous producer

== Personnel ==
Credits adapted from Tidal.

=== Musicians ===
- Giveon – lead vocals (tracks 1–8, 10–14)
- Matthew Burnett – drums (1–6, 8, 12), percussion (3), piano (6, 13), keyboards (8)
- Sevn Thomas – programming (1–3, 5–8, 12, 13), background vocals (4), glockenspiel (6)
- Troy Taylor – background vocals (1, 5, 6, 8, 13, 14)
- Jahaan Sweet – keyboards (2–4, 6, 7), piano (2, 3, 5)
- Peter Lee Johnson – strings (2–4, 7), keyboards (7)
- Jeff "Gitty" Gitelman – guitar (2, 3, 5, 6, 13), sitar (3, 6), bass (8)
- Kemy Siala – bass (2, 3, 6, 13)
- Absolutely – background vocals (2, 3)
- Elena Pinderhughes – flute (2, 5, 6, 9)
- Kyla Moscovich – horn (2, 6, 8, 9, 13)
- Jacob Scesney – saxophone (2, 8), flute (8)
- Cory Henry – organ (2, 8)
- Maneesh – keyboards (2, 13)
- Enrique Sanchez – horn (3)
- Sevyn Streeter – background vocals (4, 12), vocals (12)
- Megan Tibbits – harp (4)
- NinetyFour – programming (4)
- Tommy Parker – background vocals (5, 6, 8, 13)
- Ray "Quasi" Nelson – percussion (5)
- Los Hendrix – guitar (6)
- Lynne Fiddmont – background vocals (8)
- Rowan – programming (11, 14)
- Cashmere Cat – keyboards, programming (11)
- Leon Thomas – background vocals (12)
- Robert Gueringer – programming (14)

=== Technical ===
- John Kercy – mixing
- Colin Leonard – mastering
- Brian Cruz – engineering (all tracks), vocal engineering (3)
- Hayden Duncan – engineering (2, 5, 6, 8, 10)
- Greg Eliason – engineering (13)
- Jelli Dorman – vocal engineering (3)
- Kuk Harrell – vocal engineering (3)
- Garrett Duncan – engineering assistance (1–3, 6, 8, 10, 11, 13)
- Collin Clark – engineering assistance (1, 2, 4–6, 8, 12, 14)
- Terena Dawn – engineering assistance (2, 3, 8, 10, 12)
- Ivan Marcelo – engineering assistance (2, 4–8, 10, 13, 14)
- Danforth Webster – engineering assistance (3, 4, 11)
- Dereck Negron – engineering assistance (5, 11)
- Patrick Gardner – engineering assistance (12)

== Charts ==
=== Weekly charts ===
Weekly performance for Beloved
Chart (2025)	Peak position
Australian Albums (ARIA)	16
Australian Hip Hop/R&B Albums (ARIA)	4
Austrian Albums (Ö3 Austria)	51
Belgian Albums (Ultratop Flanders)	88
Belgian Albums (Ultratop Wallonia)	185
Canadian Albums (Billboard)	24
Dutch Albums (Album Top 100)	19
New Zealand Albums (RMNZ)	10
Nigerian Albums (TurnTable)	66
Norwegian Albums (VG-lista)	87
Portuguese Albums (AFP)	19
Swiss Albums (Schweizer Hitparade)	16
UK Albums (Official Charts)	38
UK R&B Albums (Official Charts)	2
US Billboard 200	8
US Top R&B/Hip-Hop Albums (Billboard)	4

=== Year-end charts ===
Year-end chart performance for Beloved
Chart (2025)	Position
US Top R&B/Hip-Hop Albums (Billboard)	76

== Release history ==
Release dates and formats for Beloved
Region	Date	Label(s)	Format(s)	Ref.
Various	July 11, 2025	Epic; Not So Fast	CD; digital download; streaming	

== See also ==
- 2025 in rhythm and blues music
