= When It's All Said and Done =

EP by Giveon
- Released: October 2, 2020
- Genre: R&B
- Length: 10:30
- Label: Epic
- Producer: Boi-1da; Dominic Matthews; Don Mills; Giveon; Jahaan Sweet; Rodrigo Barahona; Rowan; Schylar O'Neal; Sevn Thomas

Giveon chronology
Take Time (2020)	When It's All Said and Done (2020)	When It's All Said and Done... Take Time (2021)

Singles from When It's All Said and Done
- 1. "Stuck on You" Released: October 2, 2020

When It's All Said and Done is the second EP by American singer-songwriter Giveon. It was released on October 2, 2020, by Epic Records.

== Critical reception ==
Professional ratings
Review scores
Source	Rating
AllMusic	3.5/5 stars

In a review for AllMusic, Andy Kellman explained that the album is centered on Giveon's "deep baritone and elegant, often aching, ruminations. Not many active R&B artists are as effective at conveying conflicting emotions with such nuance."

== Chart performance ==
In the US, When It's All Said and Done peaked at number 93 on the Billboard 200 on the chart dated October 17, 2020.

The single "Stuck on You" peaked at number 17 on Billboard's Hot R&B Songs on February 27, 2021, after nine weeks on the chart.

== Track listing ==
Credits adapted from Tidal

When It's All Said and Done track listing
No.	Title	Writer(s)	Producer(s)	Length
1.	"When It's All Said and Done"	Giveon Evans; Rodrigo Barahona	Giveon; Barahona	0:55
2.	"Still Your Best"	Evans; Carlos Martin; Schyler O'Neal; Dominic Matthews; Barahona	Sevn Thomas; Rowan; O'Neal; Matthews	2:57
3.	"Last Time" (featuring Snoh Aalegra)	Evans; Snoh Nowrozi; Don Mills	Sevn Thomas; Mills	3:13
4.	"Stuck on You"	Evans; Rupert Thomas, Jr.; Barahona	Boi-1da; Sevn Thomas; Jahaan Sweet; Giveon; Barahona	3:25

== Charts ==
Chart performance for When It's All Said and Done
Chart (2020–2021)	Peak position
Canadian Albums (Billboard)	86
French Albums (SNEP)	185
US Billboard 200	93
US Top R&B/Hip-Hop Albums (Billboard)	45
