= Lost Me =

2022 single by Giveon

Single by Giveon

from the album Give or Take
- Released: June 24, 2022
- Length: 3:01
- Label: Epic; Not So Fast
- Songwriters: Giveon Evans; Rupert Thomas, Jr.; Ozan Yildirim; Ryan Vojtesak; Dominik Patrzek; Marcus Semaj
- Producers: Sevn Thomas; Oz; Charlie Handsome; Deats

Giveon singles chronology
"Lie Again" (2022)	"Lost Me" (2022)

Music video
- "Lost Me" on YouTube

"Lost Me" is a song by American singer-songwriter Giveon. It was released through Epic Records and Not So Fast as the third single from his debut studio album, Give or Take, on June 24, 2022.

== Charts ==
Chart performance for "Lost Me"
Chart (2022)	Peak position
Netherlands (Single Tip)	22
New Zealand Hot Singles (RMNZ)	26
South Africa Streaming (TOSAC)	35
UK Singles (OCC)	85
US Bubbling Under Hot 100 Singles (Billboard)	11
US Hot R&B/Hip-Hop Songs (Billboard)	42
US Rhythmic (Billboard)	30

== Certifications ==
Certifications for "Lost Me"
Region	Certification	Certified units/sales
Canada (Music Canada)	Platinum	80,000^{‡}
New Zealand (RMNZ)	Gold	15,000^{‡}
United Kingdom (BPI)	Silver	200,000^{‡}
United States (RIAA)	Gold	500,000^{‡}
^{‡} Sales+streaming figures based on certification alone.

== Release history ==
Release history for "Lost Me"
Region	Date	Format	Label	Ref.
United States	July 26, 2022	Rhythmic contemporary	Epic; Not So Fast	
United States	July 26, 2022	Urban contemporary radio	Epic; Not So Fast	
