= Chicago Freestyle =

2020 song by Drake and Giveon

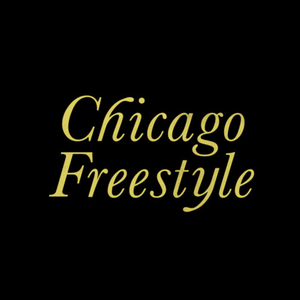

Single by Drake and Giveon

from the album Dark Lane Demo Tapes
- Released: March 1, 2020
- Genre: Hip-hop; R&B
- Length: 3:40
- Label: Republic
- Songwriters: Aubrey Graham; Giveon Evans; Rupert Thomas, Jr.; Noel Cadastre; Marshall Mathers; Jeff Bass; Steve King
- Producer: Cadastre

Music video
- "When To Say When" & "Chicago Freestyle" on YouTube

"Chicago Freestyle" is a song by Canadian rapper Drake and American singer-songwriter Giveon. It was released as the third track from Drake's commercial mixtape Dark Lane Demo Tapes, on May 1, 2020. Drake interpolates Eminem's flow from his 2002 single "Superman" on the pre-chorus. When it was unofficially released on February 29, 2020, it was released concurrently with another song, "When to Say When".

== Background ==
On February 29, 2020, Drake released "When To Say When" and "Chicago Freestyle" on SoundCloud. He also released a music video for both songs. The video stars Drake walking around New York City with scenes filmed in Marcy Projects in Brooklyn. The song is set to a "romantic" piano and a "hushed" chorus performed by Giveon. Lyrically, Drake "unpacks the run-of-the-mill anxieties and flexes" associated with his nightlife, while portraying "an underrated antagonist", as described by a Pitchfork article.

== Critical reception ==
Grant Rindner of Complex felt that the lyrics reflected "Drake's first time being hurt in a long time", acknowledging "his heartbreak makes for great songs." Kevin Montes of Medium deemed the song "one of the original standouts with its subtle melancholy vibe to Drake's reflection of celebrity life in his verses." In a mixed review of both "Chicago Freestyle" and "When To Say When", Sheldon Pearce of Pitchfork felt Drake "doesn't play the heel nearly as well as '02 Em used to." NME's Luke Morgan Britton found the song "cheesy."

== Charts ==
=== Weekly charts ===
Chart (2020)	Peak position
Austria (Ö3 Austria Top 40)	60
Canada (Canadian Hot 100)	13
France (SNEP)	62
Global 200 (Billboard)	146
Ireland (IRMA)	9
Italy (FIMI)	75
Lithuania (AGATA)	54
Netherlands (Single Top 100)	75
New Zealand (Recorded Music NZ)	31
Portugal (AFP)	38
Sweden Heatseeker (Sverigetopplistan)	3
Switzerland (Schweizer Hitparade)	34
UK Singles (OCC)	10
US Billboard Hot 100	14
US Hot R&B/Hip-Hop Songs (Billboard)	11
US Rolling Stone Top 100	6

=== Year-end charts ===
Chart (2020)	Position
US Hot R&B/Hip-Hop Songs (Billboard)	65

== Certifications ==
Certifications for "Chicago Freestyle"
Region	Certification	Certified units/sales
Australia (ARIA)	3× Platinum	210,000^{‡}
Brazil (Pro-Música Brasil)	Platinum	40,000^{‡}
Denmark (IFPI Danmark)	Platinum	90,000^{‡}
France (SNEP)	Gold	100,000^{‡}
Italy (FIMI)	Gold	50,000^{‡}
New Zealand (RMNZ)	3× Platinum	90,000^{‡}
Portugal (AFP)	Platinum	10,000^{‡}
Spain (PROMUSICAE)	Gold	30,000^{‡}
United Kingdom (BPI)	Platinum	600,000^{‡}
United States (RIAA)	5× Platinum	5,000,000^{‡}
^{‡} Sales+streaming figures based on certification alone.
