= In the Bible =

2021 song by Drake featuring Lil Durk and Giveon

Song by Drake featuring Lil Durk and Giveon

from the album Certified Lover Boy
- Released: September 3, 2021
- Length: 4:56
- Label: Republic; OVO
- Songwriters: Aubrey Graham; Durk Banks; Giveon Evans; Noah Shebib; Leon Thomas III; Eliel Afari-Brown; Austin Schindler; Simon Gebrelul
- Producers: 40; Thomas; Eli Brown; Austin Powerz

"In the Bible" is a song by Canadian rapper Drake featuring American rapper Lil Durk and American singer-songwriter Giveon. It was released on September 3, 2021, as the fourth track on Drake's sixth studio album Certified Lover Boy.

== Background ==
The track sees Drake put himself below his son, Adonis Graham, to "explain away emotional stuntedness" on the chorus, in which he sings the line: "You don't know love, you don't love me like my child". He also boasts about his body count and asks a woman for her body count. Drake delivers an "intriguing" vocal turn throughout the song. He also raps a verse. Lil Durk received praise for rapping about his girlfriend, India Royale, in his verse, specifically promoting her cosmetics line.

== Commercial performance ==
"In the Bible" debuted at number seven on the Billboard Hot 100, earning 41.4 million streams and 489 thousand in airplay audience and selling 800 thousand copies in its first week. It became one of the nine Top 10 songs on the chart. The song also peaked at number 18 in Canada, and at number nine on the Billboard Global 200 chart.

== Charts ==
=== Weekly charts ===
Chart performance for "In the Bible"
Chart (2021)	Peak position
Australia (ARIA)	14
Australia Hip-Hop/R&B Singles (ARIA)	11
Canada Hot 100 (Billboard)	18
Denmark (Tracklisten)	28
France (SNEP)	33
Global 200 (Billboard)	9
Greece International (IFPI)	40
Iceland (Tónlistinn)	29
Italy (FIMI)	86
Lithuania (AGATA)	40
Portugal (AFP)	26
Slovakia (Singles Digitál Top 100)	71
South Africa (TOSAC)	7
Sweden (Sverigetopplistan)	63
UK Audio Streaming (Official Charts)	8
US Billboard Hot 100	7
US Hot R&B/Hip-Hop Songs (Billboard)	6

=== Year-end charts ===
Year-end chart performance for "In the Bible"
Chart (2021)	Position
US Hot R&B/Hip-Hop Songs (Billboard)	81

== Certifications ==
Certifications for "In the Bible"
Region	Certification	Certified units/sales
Australia (ARIA)	Gold	35,000^{‡}
Canada (Music Canada)	Platinum	80,000^{‡}
United Kingdom (BPI)	Silver	200,000^{‡}
^{‡} Sales+streaming figures based on certification alone.
