= Lie Again =

2022 single by Giveon

Single by Giveon

from the album Give or Take
- Released: April 29, 2022
- Length: 3:07
- Label: Epic
- Songwriters: Giveon Evans; Milos Angelov
- Producers: Giveon; Don Mills

Giveon singles chronology
"For Tonight" (2021)	"Lie Again" (2022)	"Lost Me" (2022)

Music video
- "Lie Again" on YouTube

"Lie Again" is a song by American singer-songwriter Giveon. It was released through Epic Records on April 29, 2022, and serves as the second single for his debut studio album Give or Take. The song was written and produced by Giveon and Don Mills. Giveon announced the song on April 19, 2022, exactly ten days before its release.

== Background ==
"Lie Again" comes after Giveon's ex-girlfriend, fellow American singer Justine Skye, announced and released her single, "What a Lie", which seemingly takes shots at Giveon for reportedly texting other women. On "What a Lie", Skye sings: "User, what a user / A blessing, learning lessons / I see then for entertaining leeches / My poison was your peaches". In the music video, she takes a bite of a peach and spits it out on the last line, which is a likely reference to Justin Bieber's 2021 number-one single, "Peaches", in which Giveon was featured alongside Daniel Caesar on. Skye described the song as a "weak ass song", while replying to a fan's tweet. About the song, Giveon said: "'Lie Again' is a story about the internal war with oneself, battling the acceptance of the ugly-truth, and the refusal to embrace the ghosts of your lover's past. Detailing the complexities of overlooking red flags to remain blissfully ignorant in the name of love".

== Composition and lyrics ==
"Lie Again" sees Giveon in denial, in which he cannot accept that a relationship is failed. However, he asks his lover to hide the truth as it would hurt and he would not want to deal with heartbreak. He uses his baritone voice, singing: "So lie, lie again / No one has had you like I did / I don't need the truth, baby".

== Music video ==
The official music video for "Lie Again", directed by Adrian Martinez, premiered alongside the song on April 29, 2022. Giveon walks down the streets of downtown Los Angeles, California, as he sees a couple kissing on the street. At the end of the video, an unreleased song is previewed.

== Credits and personnel ==
- Giveon – vocals, songwriting, production
- Don Mills – production, songwriting
- Peter Lee Johnson – violin
- Brian Cruz – engineering, recording
- Rodrigo Barahona – engineering, recording
- John Kercy – mixing
- Colin Leonard – mastering

== Charts ==
Chart performance for "Lie Again"
Chart (2022)	Peak position
New Zealand Hot Singles (RMNZ)	16
South Africa Streaming (TOSAC)	58
US Bubbling Under Hot 100 Singles (Billboard)	9
US Hot R&B/Hip-Hop Songs (Billboard)	48

== Certifications ==
Certifications and sales for "Lie Again"
Region	Certification	Certified units/sales
Canada (Music Canada)	Gold	40,000^{‡}
United States (RIAA)	Gold	500,000^{‡}
^{‡} Sales+streaming figures based on certification alone.

== Release history ==
Release dates and formats for "Lie Again"
Region	Date	Format(s)	Label	Ref.
Various	April 29, 2022	Digital download; streaming	Epic	
United States	May 9, 2022	Rhythmic contemporary radio	Not So Fast; Epic	
