= Take Time (Giveon EP) =

EP by Giveon
- Released: March 27, 2020
- Genre: R&B
- Length: 24:06
- Label: Epic; Not So Fast
- Producer: Berkli Music; Boi-1da; Giveon; Jahaan Sweet; Kelsey Gonzalez; Loshendrix; Maneesh; River Tiber; Rodrigo Barahona; Sevn Thomas; WondaGurl; Yakob

Giveon chronology
Take Time (2020)	When It's All Said and Done (2020)

Singles from Take Time
- 1. "Like I Want You" Released: November 20, 2019; 2. "Heartbreak Anniversary" Released: February 21, 2020

Take Time is the debut EP by American R&B singer and songwriter Giveon, released by Epic Records on March 27, 2020. On the US Billboard Heatseekers chart, it was ranked as number one for three weeks in a row, beginning with January 16, 2021. The EP later peaked at number 35 on the Billboard 200. On March 14, 2021, Take Time was nominated for Best R&B Album at the 63rd Annual Grammy Awards.

== Critical reception ==
Professional ratings
Review scores
Source	Rating
AllMusic	4/5 stars

Robyn Mowatt of Okayplayer said that "Take Time is one hell of a debut. It stands out amongst the auto-tuned, generic R&B music that many artists have become comfortable shelling out".

Nerisha Penrose of Elle called the EP "a masterpiece" and said that "World We Created" is "the song I can't stop singing".

== Track listing ==
Credits adapted from Tidal

Take Time track listing
No.	Title	Writer(s)	Producer(s)	Length
1.	"The Beach"	Giveon Evans; Matthew Samuels; Jacob Rabitsch; Carlos Muñoz	Boi-1da; Yakob; Loshendrix	3:25
2.	"World We Created"	Trey Campbell; Rupert Thomas, Jr.; Maneesh Bidaye; Rabitsch	Sevn Thomas; Maneesh; Yakob	3:13
3.	"Take Time" (interlude)	Evans		0:45
4.	"Favorite Mistake"	Evans; Thomas, Jr.; Rodrigo Barahona	Sevn Thomas; Giveon; Barahona	2:52
5.	"This Ain't Love"	Evans; Ebony Oshunrinde; Jahaan Sweet; Muñoz; Varren Wade; Anthony Clemons, Jr.	WondaGurl; Sweet; Loshendrix	2:44
6.	"Heartbreak Anniversary"	Evans; Thomas, Jr.; Bidaye; Wade	Sevn Thomas; Maneesh	3:18
7.	"Like I Want You"	Evans; Thomas, Jr.; Sweet; Thomas Paxton-Beesley; Muñoz; Marcus Semaj	Sevn Thomas; Sweet; River Tiber; Loshendrix	4:20
8.	"Vanish"	Evans; Thomas, Jr.; Anthony Berkley; Kelsey Gonzalez	Sevn Thomas; Berkli Music; Gonzlez	3:29
Total length:				24:06

== Charts ==
Chart performance for Take Time
Chart (2021)	Peak position
Canadian Albums (Billboard)	49
Dutch Albums (Album Top 100)	53
US Billboard 200	35
US Top R&B/Hip-Hop Albums (Billboard)	19

== Certifications ==
Certifications for Take Time
Region	Certification	Certified units/sales
Denmark (IFPI Danmark)	Gold	10,000^{‡}
^{‡} Sales+streaming figures based on certification alone.
