= Heartbreak Anniversary =

2020 single by Giveon

Single by Giveon

from the EP Take Time
- Released: February 21, 2020
- Genre: R&B; soul
- Length: 3:16
- Label: Epic; Not So Fast
- Songwriters: Giveon Evans; Sevn Thomas; Maneesh Bidaye; Varren Wade
- Producers: Maneesh; Sevn Thomas

Giveon singles chronology
"Like I Want You" (2019)	"Heartbreak Anniversary" (2020)	"Stuck on You" (2020)

Music video
- "Heartbreak Anniversary" on YouTube

"Heartbreak Anniversary" is a song by the American singer and songwriter Giveon. It was released on February 21, 2020, as the second single from his debut EP, Take Time (2020). Written from the perspective of a friend of Giveon's, the downtempo ballad finds him singing about the date of a breakup, reminiscing and grieving about a love gone wrong. The song became a sleeper hit, gaining initial chart success in early 2021. A music video for the song was later released, and the song was sent to US radio in March 2021. It reached number one in Malaysia and Singapore, and number sixteen on the US Billboard Hot 100.

"Heartbreak Anniversary" was also included on Giveon's compilation album, When It's All Said and Done... Take Time, which was released in March 2021. The song has since been certified 6× platinum by the Recording Industry Association of America (RIAA).

== Background and writing ==
"Heartbreak Anniversary" was written by Giveon from the perspective of someone else, as Giveon explained: "I was talking to a friend, and they told me they broke up with their significant other exactly a year ago, and I was like, 'Oh, alright, I'm going to write a song about that'". In an interview with Billboard, Giveon said that he drew further inspiration from how he copes with a day that continues to bring many "lovesick" memories every year. He stated,

So "Heartbreak Anniversary" is just the anniversary of a heartbreak. Say you guys are heartbroken on Valentine's Day, February 14th. Every time Valentine's Day comes around you kinda revisit the pain and revisit the sorrow. So with this song, I tried to make pain sound beautiful.

"Heartbreak Anniversary" was released on Giveon's birthday. In early 2021, the song went viral on the video-sharing app, TikTok. By March 15, 2021, the song had surpassed 143 million streams, including 97 million streams on Spotify.

== Composition and lyrics ==
On "Heartbreak Anniversary", Giveon sings about the day his heart was broken, reminiscing about every detail, and the pain that comes with heartbreak. He appears emotional and vulnerable, "foolishly" hoping that his ex lover will return. Musically, Giveon delivers soaring vocals over a largely piano and percussion-based mid-tempo electro and soul merged instrumental. Apple Music noted how he creates "harmonies with himself that render a simple line like 'Don't want to let you out my head' as gospel". Rolling Stone's Elias Leight labeled the song "a swelling, disconsolate ballad built around mournful piano and gnarled guitars. Giveon's vocals on the song was compared to that of Frank Sinatra, but "with an R&B flavour and a young fresh take on the Rat Pack style".

== Critical reception ==
Milcah P. of HotNewHipHop called the song "enchanting", further stating: "The cut is characterized by a seamless mixture of Giveon's signature baritone and flawless falsettos. It's a wonderful display of range and composition and easily has Giveon pegged as one to watch within the R&B realm". Writing for Manila Bulletin, Punch Liwanag said the track "is the best representation of who and what Givēon is all about, at least for the time being". Uproxx's Wongo Okon called it a standout from Take Time. Similarly, Billboard's Carl Lamarre said "Highlights [on Take Time] like 'Heartbreak Anniversary' and 'Favorite Mistake' showcase his penchant for pensive lyrics and moody soundscapes". Pitchfork named the song among their "Pitchfork Selects" playlist for the week of March 22, 2021. NPR's Sidney Madden included the song in their Heat Check feature for February 2021, noting the wishful lyrics: "being 'foolishly patient' will serve you no good here. This is the type of firmly rooted pain that only twists deeper".

== Accolades ==
Awards and nominations for "Heartbreak Anniversary"
Year	Organization	Award	Result	Ref(s)
2021	MTV Video Music Awards	Best R&B	Nominated	
2021	MTV Video Music Awards	Song of Summer	Nominated	
2021	American Music Awards	Favorite R&B Song	Nominated	
2022	Grammy Awards	Best R&B Song	Nominated	

== Music video ==
The official video was released on March 12, 2021, over a year after the single's release. It was directed by Salomon Ligthelm, and released on the same day as Giveon's compilation, When It's All Said and Done... Take Time. The "aesthetically pleasing" visual finds Giveon grieving and reflecting on the good and bad times he had with his ex lover, played by Samantha Logan. He is seen transitioning between his "lonely present and his turbulent past". In a May 2020 interview with Billboard, Giveon said he could see himself making a short film or story out of the song, because it has "so much depth [...] and a lot of stuff that wasn't told in the song. 'Heartbreak Anniversary' just talks about the break-up. It doesn't talk about what led to the break-up".

== Commercial performance ==
The song initially broke out in Southeast Asia, reaching number one on the Spotify charts in the Philippines, Malaysia, Singapore and Indonesia, and the top 10 of various other countries. It has been certified 3× Platinum by the RIAA for units of over 3,000,000 in the US.

== Credits and personnel ==
Credits adapted from Billboard.

- Giveon – vocals, songwriter, composer
- Sevn Thomas – songwriter, composer, production
- Maneesh Bidaye – songwriter, composer, production
- Varren Wade – songwriter, composer

== Charts ==
=== Weekly charts ===
Chart performance for "Heartbreak Anniversary"
Chart (2021)	Peak position
Australia (ARIA)	12
Austria (Ö3 Austria Top 40)	67
Belgium (Ultratip Bubbling Under Flanders)	15
Brazil (Top 50 Streaming)	48
Canada (Canadian Hot 100)	25
Denmark (Tracklisten)	28
France (SNEP)	112
Global 200 (Billboard)	10
Ireland (IRMA)	30
Lithuania (AGATA)	27
Malaysia (RIM)	1
Netherlands (Single Top 100)	50
New Zealand (Recorded Music NZ)	2
Norway (VG-lista)	33
Portugal (AFP)	10
Singapore (RIAS)	1
Slovakia (Singles Digitál Top 100)	57
South Africa (RISA)	6
Sweden (Sverigetopplistan)	58
Switzerland (Schweizer Hitparade)	34
UK Singles (Official Charts)	35
UK Hip Hop/R&B (Official Charts)	13
US Billboard Hot 100	16
US Hot R&B/Hip-Hop Songs (Billboard)	5
US Mainstream Top 40 (Billboard)	13
US Rhythmic (Billboard)	3
US Rolling Stone Top 100	9

2023 chart performance for "Heartbreak Anniversary"
Chart (2023)	Peak position
South Korea (Circle)	190

=== Year-end charts ===
Year-end chart performance for "Heartbreak Anniversary"
Chart (2021)	Position
Australia (ARIA)	54
Canada (Canadian Hot 100)	80
Global 200 (Billboard)	39
New Zealand (Recorded Music NZ)	13
Portugal (AFP)	63
US Billboard Hot 100	31
US Hot R&B/Hip-Hop Songs (Billboard)	10
US Mainstream Top 40 (Billboard)	50
US Rhythmic (Billboard)	19

== Certifications ==
Certifications for "Heartbreak Anniversary"
Region	Certification	Certified units/sales
Australia (ARIA)	2× Platinum	140,000^{‡}
Brazil (Pro-Música Brasil)	Gold	20,000^{‡}
Canada (Music Canada)	5× Platinum	400,000^{‡}
Denmark (IFPI Danmark)	Platinum	90,000^{‡}
France (SNEP)	Platinum	200,000^{‡}
Mexico (AMPROFON)	Platinum	60,000^{‡}
New Zealand (RMNZ)	5× Platinum	150,000^{‡}
Portugal (AFP)	Platinum	10,000^{‡}
Spain (Promusicae)	Gold	30,000^{‡}
United Kingdom (BPI)	Platinum	600,000^{‡}
United States (RIAA)	6× Platinum	6,000,000^{‡}
Streaming
Sweden (GLF)	Platinum	8,000,000^{†}
^{‡} Sales+streaming figures based on certification alone.^{†} Streaming-only figures based on certification alone.

== Release history ==
Country	Date	Format	Label	Ref.
Various	February 21, 2020	Digital download; streaming	Epic; Not So Fast	
United States	March 16, 2021	Urban contemporary radio	Epic; Not So Fast	
United States	March 23, 2021	Contemporary hit radio	Epic; Not So Fast	
Australia	April 2, 2021	Contemporary hit radio	Epic; Not So Fast	

== See also ==
- List of number-one songs of 2021 (Malaysia)
- List of number-one songs of 2021 (Singapore)
