= Giveon =

American R&B singer (born 1995)

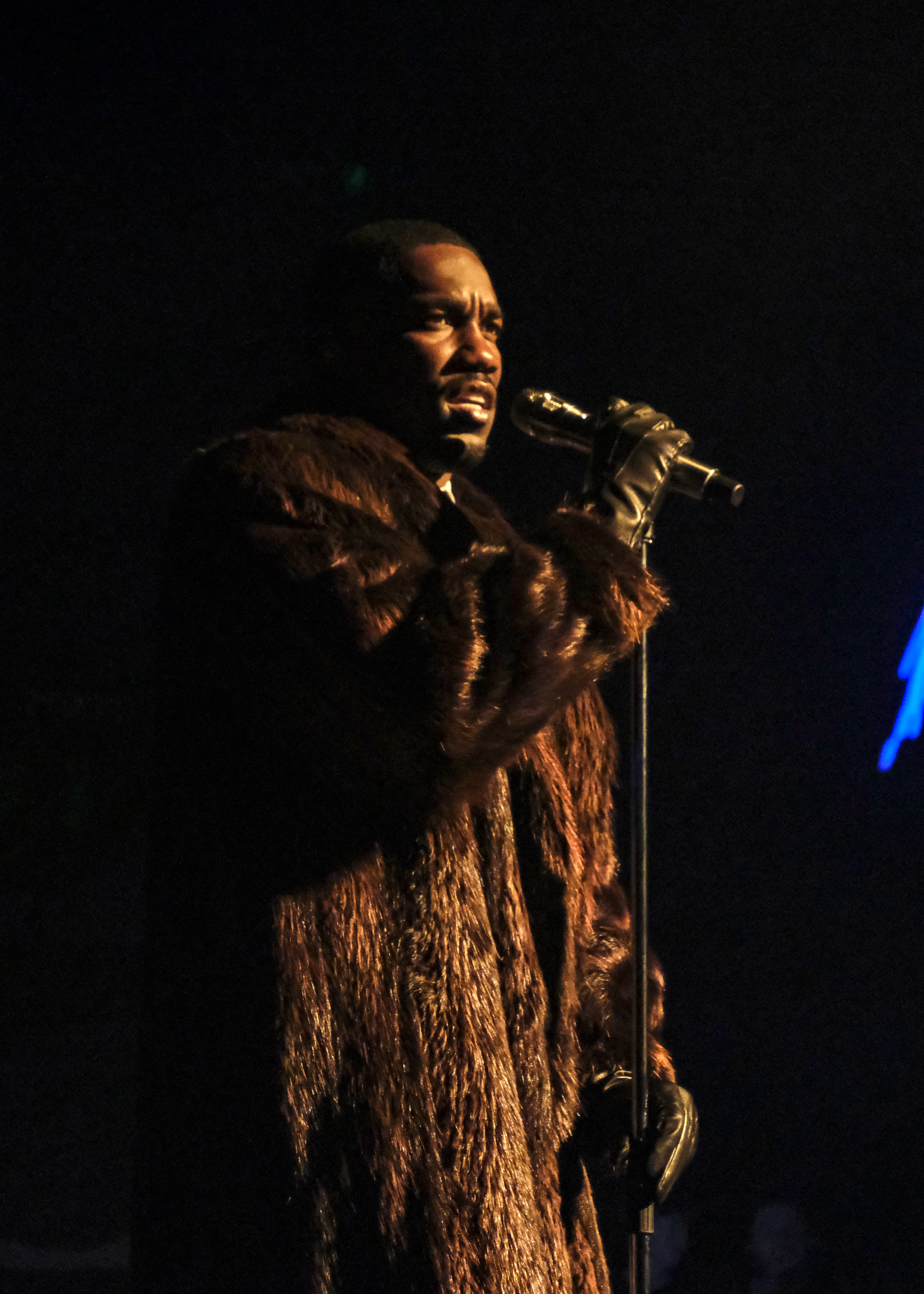
- Giveon in 2026

Background information
- Born: Giveon Dezmann Evans; February 21, 1995 (age 31); Long Beach, California, U.S.
- Genres: Neo soul; R&B
- Occupations: Singer; songwriter
- Years active: 2018–present
- Labels: Not So Fast; Epic
- Website: giveonofficial.com

Giveon Dezmann Evans (US: /ˈɡɪviɑːn/; born February 21, 1995), mononymously known as Giveon (stylized as GIVĒON), is an American R&B singer and songwriter. He rose to prominence with his 2019 song "Like I Want You", which peaked at number 87 on the Billboard Hot 100. In 2020, Giveon signed with Epic Records to release two extended plays: the Grammy Award-nominated Take Time and When It's All Said and Done; the former was preceded by the single "Heartbreak Anniversary", which peaked at number 16 on the chart and received quintuple platinum certification by the Recording Industry Association of America (RIAA).

Evans guest performed alongside Daniel Caesar on Justin Bieber's 2021 single "Peaches", which debuted atop the Billboard Global 200, Billboard Hot 100, and Canadian Hot 100, also receiving four Grammy Award nominations. That same year, his two EPs were bundled into the compilation album When It's All Said and Done.... Take Time (2021), which peaked at number five on the Billboard 200. In 2021, he guest performed alongside Lil Durk on Drake's song "In the Bible" which peaked at number 7 on the Billboard Hot 100, becoming his second top ten song on the chart. His debut studio album, Give or Take (2022), peaked at number 11 on the Billboard 200, while his second studio album, Beloved (2025), peaked at number 8.

== Early life ==
Giveon Dezmann Evans was born in Long Beach, California. He and his two brothers grew up in a home with a single mother; he realized his passion for music at a young age, often singing at birthday parties. He credits his mother with pushing him to explore this early love for music and protecting him and his brothers from the pressures of gang culture and poverty. He attended Long Beach Polytechnic High School, and took a music education program at the Grammy Museum at age 18, where he fell in love with Frank Sinatra, whose bellowing voice was inspiring to the teenager. Giveon listened to R&B and soul and was also greatly inspired by Drake. Giveon fell in love with Barry White and Frank Sinatra music through a Recording Academy program where children learned music history. Giveon was inspired by 1960s jazz and wanted to modernize what he heard.

== Career ==
=== 2018–2019: Career beginnings ===
Giveon self-released his debut single "Garden Kisses" in August 2018. Shortly after that he was discovered by Canadian record producer Sevn Thomas, who found him on a random playlist on SoundCloud, and later signed him to his record label Not So Fast and Epic Records. After signing, he started to perform his original songs at different live venues, including "Like I Want You", before recording them professionally. In November 2019, he released the single "Like I Want You" shortly before serving as an opening act for Snoh Aalegra on her Ugh, A Mini Tour Again of Europe and North America.

=== 2019–2021: When It's All Said and Done... Take Time ===
In 2019, Giveon toured with Snoh Aalegra, where Giveon would often freestyle as he only had two songs out at the time. Giveon's manager sent his freestyle performance from Chicago to Drake. It led to their collaboration "Chicago Freestyle", which is how the single got its name. In February 2020, he was featured on Drake's single "Chicago Freestyle", which had only been uploaded to SoundCloud and YouTube at the time. In March 2020, he released his debut EP, Take Time, which was executive produced by Thomas. The EP topped Billboard's Heatseekers Albums chart, earning Giveon his first charting project. Take Time also received acclaim from contemporary music critics who called it "breathtaking" and "polished". In May 2020, "Chicago Freestyle" was released on streaming platforms, alongside Drake's mixtape, Dark Lane Demo Tapes. The song peaked at number 14 on the Billboard Hot 100, earning Giveon his first Billboard-charting single. It also became a top 40 single in the United Kingdom, Canada, New Zealand and Switzerland. In September 2020, Giveon announced the release of his four track second extended play (EP), When It's All Said and Done, and released its lead single, "Stuck on You". After being released on October 2, 2020, the EP debuted at number 93 on the Billboard 200. With a rapid increase of mainstream attention, Giveon's singles "Stuck on You" and "Like I Want You" began to enter a number of Billboards R&B charts in late 2020, with the latter later being certified gold by the Recording Industry Association of America in December 2020. During that time, Giveon earned his first Grammy Award nomination when Take Time was nominated for Best R&B Album at the 2021 Grammy Awards. He also made his debut television performance on Jimmy Kimmel Live!, performing "Stuck on You".

During the week of February 27, 2021, Giveon earned his second and third Billboard Hot 100 entries with "Heartbreak Anniversary" and "Like I Want You", entering the chart at numbers 74 and 95, respectively. On March 12, he released the compilation album, When It's All Said and Done... Take Time, a combination of his first two EPs, which included a new song titled "All to Me". Just a week later, he was featured alongside Daniel Caesar on Justin Bieber's hit single "Peaches" from his album Justice.

=== 2022–present: Give or Take and Beloved ===
On June 2, 2022, Giveon announced the release of his debut studio album, Give or Take with a 47-second-long album trailer uploaded to his social media platforms. On June 24, the album was released with production from Cardo Got Wings, Boi-1da, Sevn Thomas, Jahaan Sweet, Rogét Chahayed, and Giveon himself. Upon the release of the album, it was met with favourable reviews from critics and debuted at number 11 on the Billboard 200 albums chart. Give or Take was supported by the singles, "For Tonight", "Lie Again", and "Lost Me", the former certified platinum by the RIAA and the latter two certified gold. On September 16, 2022, Epic Records revealed that Giveon recorded a track for the film Amsterdam called “Time,” co-written by Drake.

After a hiatus consisting of small features and holiday songs, on January 10, 2025, Giveon appeared as a guest appearance on Teddy Swims's single "Are You Even Real". He was also featured on Nigerian singer Ayra Starr's "Last Heartbreak Song", a mid-tempo R&B ballad from her album The Year I Turned 21. The collaboration, which Starr described as "one of the best decisions I've ever made," marked a rare music video appearance for Giveon, who stated he agreed to participate because he was "a big fan of Ayra." On May 28, Giveon announced the release of his sophomore album, Beloved. The album released on July 11 to high reviews from critics'. The album was supported by the singles "Twenties" and "Rather Be". Giveon credits the Grammy Museum for introducing him to the musicians that inspired the album's sound.

== Artistry ==
Giveon is known for his baritone vocals. He is inspired by jazz music from the 1960s and 1970s. He cites Frank Sinatra, Frank Ocean, Drake, Adele, and Sampha as some of his biggest influences.

== Discography ==
Studio albums

- Give or Take (2022)
- Beloved (2025)

== Tours ==
Headlining

- Timeless Tour (2021) – Giveon's first tour, consisting of fourteen different shows spread throughout North America. One show was outside of the United States, in Toronto, Canada where Drake made an appearance.
- Give or Take Tour (2022) – Began on August 22, 2022, in Philadelphia, Pennsylvania and ended on October 21, 2022, in Toronto, Canada. The tour included North-American locations and Canadian locations in Montreal and Toronto. After the presale, Giveon added more tour dates, extending the tour by six shows.
- Dear Beloved, The Tour (2025-2026)

Supporting

- Ugh, A Mini Tour Again (2019) – The Ugh, A Mini Tour Again was a North American fall tour by Swedish singer Snoh Aalegra, held in support for her second studio album, "Ugh, Those Feels Again". The tour began on November 21, 2019, in Chicago, Illinois, and ended on December 7, 2019, in Los Angeles, California – spanning a total of 7 dates.

== Awards and nominations ==
Organization	Year	Category	Nominated work	Result	Ref.
American Music Awards	2022	Favorite Male R&B Artist	Giveon	Nominated	
BET Awards	2021	Best Male R&B/Pop Artist	Giveon	Nominated	
BET Awards	2021	Best New Artist	Giveon	Won	
Grammy Awards	2021	Best R&B Album	Take Time	Nominated	
Grammy Awards	2022	Album of the Year	Justice (as featured artist and songwriter)	Nominated	
Grammy Awards	2022	Record of the Year	"Peaches" (with Justin Bieber & Daniel Caesar)	Nominated	
Grammy Awards	2022	Song of the Year	"Peaches" (with Justin Bieber & Daniel Caesar)	Nominated	
Grammy Awards	2022	Best R&B Performance	"Peaches" (with Justin Bieber & Daniel Caesar)	Nominated	
Grammy Awards	2022	Best Music Video	"Peaches" (with Justin Bieber & Daniel Caesar)	Nominated	
Grammy Awards	2022	Best R&B Song	"Heartbreak Anniversary"	Nominated	
Grammy Awards	2026	Best R&B Album	Beloved	Nominated	
MTV Video Music Awards	2021	Best New Artist	Giveon	Nominated	
MTV Video Music Awards	2021	Best Collaboration	"Peaches" (with Justin Bieber & Daniel Caesar)	Nominated	
MTV Video Music Awards	2021	Best Pop	"Peaches" (with Justin Bieber & Daniel Caesar)	Won	
MTV Video Music Awards	2021	Best Editing	"Peaches" (with Justin Bieber & Daniel Caesar)	Nominated	
MTV Video Music Awards	2021	Song of Summer	"Peaches" (with Justin Bieber & Daniel Caesar)	Nominated	
MTV Video Music Awards	2021	Song of Summer	"Heartbreak Anniversary"	Nominated	
MTV Video Music Awards	2021	Best R&B	"Heartbreak Anniversary"	Nominated	
MTV Video Music Awards	2024	Best Afrobeats	"Last Heartbreak Song" (with Ayra Starr)	Nominated	
NAACP Image Awards	2021	Outstanding New Artist	Giveon	Nominated	
NAACP Image Awards	2022	Outstanding Male Artist	Giveon	Nominated	
NAACP Image Awards	2022	Outstanding Album	When It's All Said and Done... Take Time	Nominated	
iHeartRadio Music Awards	2022	Best New R&B Artist	Giveon	Won	
iHeartRadio Music Awards	2022	R&B Artist of the Year	Giveon	Nominated	
iHeartRadio Music Awards	2022	Best New Pop Artist	Giveon	Nominated	
iHeartRadio Music Awards	2022	Song of the Year	"Peaches" (feat. Daniel Caesar and Giveon)	Nominated	
iHeartRadio Music Awards	2022	Best Music Video	"Peaches" (feat. Daniel Caesar and Giveon)	Nominated	
iHeartRadio Music Awards	2022	Best Collaboration	"Peaches" (feat. Daniel Caesar and Giveon)	Nominated	
iHeartRadio Music Awards	2022	R&B Song of the Year	"Heartbreak Anniversary"	Nominated	
