= Sevn Thomas =

Canadian record producer, songwriter and singer (born 1991)

- Also known as: Suga Prince
- Born: Rupert Thomas Jr. July 7, 1991 (age 35); Toronto, Ontario, Canada
- Genres: Hip hop; trap; R&B; dancehall; reggae
- Occupations: Record producer; songwriter; singer
- Instruments: FL Studio; Vocals
- Years active: 2002–present
- Label: Not So Fast

Rupert "Sevn" Thomas Jr. (born July 7, 1991) is a Canadian record producer, songwriter and singer. He has produced and written numerous hit songs including Rihanna's "Work", Drake's "Pop Style" and "Chicago Freestyle," Travis Scott's "Wake Up", Nicki Minaj's "Run & Hide", Giveon's "Heartbreak Anniversary", and numerous others. He also released a 2014 instrumental EP entitled Hidden Hand. As a youth, he performed as a singer under the stage name Suga Prince.

== Early life ==
Rupert Thomas Jr. was born and raised in the Scarborough district of Toronto, Ontario. His parents were born in Jamaica. They both had their own sound systems (Lover's Choice and Love Choice International) and would often hold parties in their basement. Dancehall artist, Rappa Robert, is Thomas' uncle who would take him to studio sessions in Jamaica, including at UB40's studio. In grade 5, Thomas began making beats on a Korg Triton and in 2002, at ten years old, he released a single called "Too Young for Love" featuring Master T under the stage name, Suga Prince. The music video for that song featured a 12-year-old Ayesha Curry.

Thomas signed to Sony BMG around that time but eventually put his music career on hold after the label folded. He first met producer Boi-1da while working with Sony. During high school, Thomas continued making beats often at Sunny Diamonds' studio in Toronto. It was there that he reconnected with Boi-1da, who would become his mentor and frequent collaborator. In 2012, Thomas faced off against WondaGurl (another Boi-1da protege) at the Battle of the Beat Makers. The judges were unable to choose a winner.

== Career ==
In 2013, Thomas began accruing production and songwriting credits including on Kelly Rowland's "Love Me Til I Die", Skeme's "No Time", and Ben Stevenson's "Opposites Attract". In 2014, Thomas produced Mobb Deep's "Low" before releasing his own instrumental EP, Hidden Hand, in April of that year. The EP featured co-production from Jordan Evans and Prezident Jeff.

In 2015 and 2016, Thomas co-produced (with Boi-1da and others) a series of songs that appeared on the Billboard Hot 100, including Drake's "10 Bands" (number 58) and "Pop Style" (number 16), and Rihanna's "Work" (number 1). Billboard credited him as one of seven producers "who brought dancehall back to the charts in 2016". That year, he also co-produced PartyNextDoor's "Don't Run", which reached number 22 on the Billboard Hot R&B Songs chart. In April 2016, he released the single "Can't Sleep Alone" featuring Australian singer, NYNE. He continued producing records in 2017 including Travis Scott's "Green & Purple", Kehlani's "Get Like", and GoldLink's "Pray Everyday".

In 2018, he produced tracks on numerous notable albums including Travis Scott's Astroworld ("Wake Up" and "Houstonfornication"), Nicki Minaj's Queen ("Run & Hide"), Lil Wayne's Tha Carter V ("Let It Fly"), and The Carters' Everything Is Love ("Friends").

== Discography ==
=== EPs ===
List of EPs with selected album details
Title	Details
Hidden Hand	Released: April 18, 2014 (US); Label: Boi-1da Productions; Formats: Digital download

=== Singles ===
List of singles showing year released and album name
Title	Year	Album
"Can't Sleep Alone" (feat. Nyne)	2016	Non-album single

=== Remixes ===
List of non-single guest appearances, with other performing artists
Title	Artist	Year	Album
"After You Left" (feat. Nyne)	GoldLink	2016	And After That, We Didn't Talk - The Remixes

=== Songwriting and production ===
Selected songs with production and songwriting credits
Song name	Year	Primary artist(s)	Album	Role	Notes
"Love Me Til I Die"	2013	Kelly Rowland	Talk a Good Game	Co-writer	Bonus track
"No Time"	2013	Skeme	Ingleworld	Co-producer	
"Opposites Attract"	2013	Ben Stevenson	Non-album single	Co-producer	
"Low"	2014	Mobb Deep (feat. Mack Wilds)	The Infamous Mobb Deep	Co-producer	
"Love for the 6"	2014	Tre Capital	Gundam Pt. 1	Producer	
"10 Bands"	2015	Drake	If You're Reading This It's Too Late	Co-producer, co-writer	US No. 58
"In The Bag"	2015	Mac Miller	GO:OD AM	Producer	
"Work"	2016	Rihanna (feat. Drake)	Anti	Co-producer	US No. 1
"Pop Style"	2016	Drake (feat. Jay-Z and Kanye West)	Views	Co-producer	US No. 16
"Don't Run"	2016	PartyNextDoor	PartyNextDoor 3	Co-producer, co-writer	US R&B No. 22
"Green & Purple"	2017	Travis Scott (feat. Playboi Carti)	Non-album single	Co-producer	
"Get Like"	2017	Kehlani	SweetSexySavage	Co-producer, co-writer	
"Pray Everyday"	2017	GoldLink	At What Cost	Co-producer, co-writer	
"We Will Never Die"	2017	GoldLink (feat. Lil Dude)	At What Cost	Co-producer, co-writer	
"Keep Me"	2017	Khalid	American Teen	Co-producer, co-writer	
"Wake Up"	2018	Travis Scott (feat. The Weeknd)	Astroworld	Co-producer, co-writer	US No. 30
"Houstonfornication"	2018	Travis Scott	Astroworld	Co-producer, co-writer	US No. 53
"Run & Hide"	2018	Nicki Minaj	Queen	Co-producer, co-writer	
"Friends"	2018	The Carters	Everything Is Love	Co-producer	
"Let It Fly"	2018	Lil Wayne (feat. Travis Scott)	Tha Carter V	Producer	US No. 10
"Chicago Freestyle"	2020	Drake (featuring Giveon)	Dark Lane Demo Tapes	Co-producer, co-writer	
"Heartbreak Anniversary"	2020	Giveon	Take Time	Co-producer, co-writer	
"SKITZO"	2023	Travis Scott (featuring Young Thug)	UTOPIA	Co-producer	US No. 34
