= 2021 in rhythm and blues =

This article summarizes the events, album releases, and album release dates in rhythm and blues for the year 2021.

== Events ==
=== January ===
- On January 8, Jay W. McGee died at the age of 70. On the same day, Michael Fonfara died at the age of 74.
- On January 9, the 35th Golden Disc Awards were held. BTS won Disc Daesang (Album of the Year) for Map of the Soul: 7.
- On January 16, Phil Spector died at the age of 81. On the same day, Little Walter DeVenne died at the age of 73.
- On January 18, Jimmie Rodgers died at the age of 87.
- On January 29, Grady Gaines died at the age of 86.

=== February ===
- On February 4, Jessie Smith died at the age of 79. On the same day, Nolan Porter died at the age of 71, and Gil Saunders died.
- On February 8, Mary Wilson died at the age of 76.
- On February 14, Ari Gold died at the age of 47.
- On February 17, Gene Summers died at the age of 82.

=== March ===
- On March 2, Chris Barber died at the age of 90.
- On March 3, DJ Advicer died.
- On March 14, the 63rd Annual Grammy Awards were held. H.E.R. won Song of the Year for "I Can't Breathe". Kaytranada won Best Dance/Electronic Album for Bubba. Kaytranada and Kali Uchis won Best Dance Recording for "10%". Beyoncé won Best R&B Performance for "Black Parade". Ledisi won Best Traditional R&B Performance for "Anything for You". Robert Glasper, H.E.R., and Meshell Ndegeocello won Best R&B Song for "Better Than I Imagined". Thundercat won Best Progressive R&B Album for It Is What It Is. John Legend won Best R&B Album for Bigger Love. Anderson .Paak won Best Melodic Rap Performance for "Lockdown".
- On March 15, Doug Parkinson died at the age of 74.
- On March 17, Gerhard Augustin died at the age of 79.
- On March 19, Margie Evans died at the age of 81.
- On March 27, the 52nd NAACP Image Awards were held. Jhené Aiko won Outstanding Album for Chilombo. Doja Cat won Outstanding New Artist. Beyoncé won Outstanding Female Artist. Drake won Outstanding Male Artist. Chloe x Halle won Outstanding Duo, Group or Collaboration (Traditional) for "Wonder What She Thinks of Me" and Outstanding Soul/R&B Song for "Do It". Beyoncé, Wizkid, Saint Jhn, and Blue Ivy Carter won Outstanding Music Video/Visual Album for "Brown Skin Girl".
- On March 29, Trisha Cee was killed at the age of 26.

=== April ===
- On April 1, Quindon Tarver was killed at the age of 38.
- On April 10, Bob Porter died at the age of 80. On the same day, Quinton Claunch died at the age of 99.
- On April 28, the APRA Music Awards of 2021 were held. The Kid Laroi won Breakthrough Songwriter of the Year. Busby Marou won Most Performed Blues & Roots Work for "Over Drinking Over You". The Teskey Brothers won Most Performed R&B / Soul Work for "Rain".
- On April 30, John Dee Holeman died at the age of 92.

=== May ===
- On May 7, Cassiano died at the age of 77.
- On May 11, the Brit Awards 2021 were held. Arlo Parks won Breakthrough Artist. The Weeknd won International Male Solo Artist. Little Mix won British Group.
- On May 20, Roger Hawkins died at the age of 75.
- On May 23, the 2021 Billboard Music Awards were held. The Weeknd won Top Artist, Top Male Artist, Top R&B Artist, Top R&B Male Artist, Top R&B Album for After Hours, and Top Hot 100 Song, Top R&B Song, and Top Radio Song for "Blinding Lights". BTS won Top Duo/Group, Top Song Sales Artist, Top Social Artist, and Top Selling Song for "Dynamite". Saint Jhn won Top Dance/Electronic Song for "Roses". Doja Cat won Top R&B Female Artist.
- On May 26, Red Top Young died at the age of 85.
- On May 27, the 2021 iHeartRadio Music Awards were held. The Weeknd won Male Artist of the Year and Song of the Year for "Blinding Lights". Jhené Aiko won R&B Album of the Year for Chilombo. Doja Cat won Best New Pop Artist. H.E.R. won R&B Artist of the Year. Snoh Aalegra won Best New R&B Artist. Chris Brown & Young Thug won R&B Song of the Year for "Go Crazy".
- On May 31, Lloyd Price died at the age of 88.

=== June ===
- On June 6, the Juno Awards of 2021 were held. The Weeknd won Artist of the Year, Songwriter of the Year, Single of the Year for "Blinding Lights", and Album of the Year and Contemporary R&B/Soul Recording of the Year for After Hours. Kaytranada won Dance Recording of the Year for Bubba. Savannah Ré won Traditional R&B/Soul Recording of the Year for "Solid".
- On June 8, Dean Parrish died at the age of 78.
- On June 17, the 2021 Libera Awards were held. Thundercat won Best R&B Record for It Is What It Is. Fantastic Negrito won Best Blues Record for Have You Lost Your Mind Yet?. Arlo Parks won Breakthrough Artist/Release. Mavis Staples won the Icon Award.
- On June 20, Ike Stubblefield died at the age of 69.
- On June 25, Lou Courtney died at the age of 77.
- On June 27, the BET Awards 2021 were held. Jazmine Sullivan won Album of the Year for Heaux Tales. H.E.R. won Best Female R&B/Pop Artist. Chris Brown won Best Male R&B/Pop Artist. Giveon won Best New Artist. Silk Sonic won Best Group. SZA won the BET Her Award for "Good Days".

=== July ===
- On July 1, Anthony Reynard Watson died at the age of 64. On the same day, Steve Kekana died at the age of 63.
- On July 5, Raffaella Carrà died at the age of 78.
- On July 7, Sam Reed died at the age of 85.
- On July 11, Sound Sultan died at the age of 44.
- On July 13, Bob Sargeant died at the age of 73.
- On July 18, Winston Soso died at the age of 69.
- On July 21, Clarence McDonald died at the age of 76.

=== August ===
- On August 7, Dennis "Dee Tee" Thomas died at the age of 70.
- On August 8, Bruce Conte died at the age of 71.
- On August 9, Chucky Thompson died at the age of 53. On the same day, Siti Sarah died at the age of 36.
- On August 11, Mike Finnigan died at the age of 76.
- On August 16, Clifford Coulter died.
- On August 21, Don Everly died at the age of 84.
- On August 27, Sam Salter died at the age of 46.

=== September ===
- On September 1, Waldo Holmes died at the age of 92.
- On September 2, Baron Browne died at the age of 61.
- On September 8, Robin Russell died at the age of 69.
- On September 12, Melvin Dunlap died at the age of 76. On the same day, the 2021 MTV Video Music Awards were held. Doja Cat and SZA won Best Collaboration for "Kiss Me More". Silk Sonic won Best R&B and Best Editing for "Leave the Door Open".
- On September 20, Sarah Dash died at the age of 76.
- On September 23, Pee Wee Ellis died at the age of 80.
- On September 27, Andrea Martin died at the age of 49.
- On September 28, Dr. Lonnie Smith died at the age of 79.
- On September 29, Julia Nixon died at the age of 66.

=== October ===
- On October 11, Deon Estus died at the age of 65. On the same day, Emani 22 died at the age of 22.
- On October 25, Herbie Herbert died at the age of 73.

=== November ===
- On November 4, the 2021 UK Music Video Awards were held. Celeste won Best R&B/Soul Video - UK for "Tonight, Tonight". Normani and Cardi B won Best R&B/Soul Video - International for "Wild Side". Bamao Yendé and Le Diouck and won Best R&B/Soul Video - Newcomer for "Marvin Gaye". Joy Crookes won Best Wardrobe Styling in a Video and Best Hair & Make-up in a Video for "Feet Don't Fail Me Now".
- On November 11, Graeme Edge died at the age of 80.
- On November 13, Philip Margo died at the age of 79.
- On November 17, the 12th Hollywood Music in Media Awards were held. H.E.R. won Best Original Song — TV Show/Limited Series for "Change" from We Are People.
- On November 18, Slide Hampton died at the age of 89. On the same day, the J Awards of 2021 were held. Genesis Owusu won Australian Album of the Year for Smiling with No Teeth.
- On November 21, the American Music Awards of 2021 were held. BTS won Artist of the Year. Doja Cat and SZA won Collaboration of the Year for "Kiss Me More". Doja Cat won Favorite Female Artist – R&B and Favorite Album – R&B for Planet Her. The Weeknd won Favorite Male Artist – R&B. Silk Sonic won Favorite Song – R&B for "Leave the Door Open". Kali Uchis won Favorite Song – Latin for "Telepatía".
- On November 24, the 2021 ARIA Music Awards were held. Genesis Owusu won Album of the Year, Best Independent Release, Best Cover Art, and Best Hip Hop Release for Smiling with No Teeth. Budjerah won Breakthrough Artist. Archie Roach won Best Blues & Roots Album for The Songs of Charcoal Lane. Tkay Maidza won Best Soul/R&B Release for Last Year Was Weird (Vol. 3).
- On November 28, the 2021 Soul Train Music Awards were held. Yung Bleu won Best New Artist. Charlie Wilson won the Soul Train Certified Award. Jazmine Sullivan won Best R&B/Soul Female Artist and Album of the Year for Heaux Tales. Giveon won Best R&B/Soul Male Artist. Silk Sonic won Song of the Year, Video of the Year, and The Ashford & Simpson Songwriter's Award for "Leave the Door Open". Normani and Cardi B won Best Dance Performance for "Wild Side". Wizkid and Tems won Best Collaboration for "Essence".
- On November 30, Kal Rudman died at the age of 91.

=== December ===
- On December 3, Melvin Parker died at the age of 77.
- On December 9, David Lasley died at the age of 74. On the same day, the 2021 Music Victoria Awards were held. Hiatus Kaiyote won Best Victorian Song for "Red Room".
- On December 12, the 8th African Muzik Magazine Awards were held. Wizkid won Artist of The Year, the Crossing Boundaries With Music Award, and Song of The Year for "Essence (Remix)" with Tems and Justin Bieber.
- On December 13, Joe Simon died at the age of 85.
- On December 14, Phil Chen died at the age of 80.
- On December 15, Wanda Young died at the age of 78.

== Released albums ==
=== January ===
Day	Artist(s)	Album	Record label(s)
5	Rakiyah	Into The Cosmos	Self-released
6	SixTones	1ST	Sony Japan
8	Aaron Frazer	Introducing...	Dead Oceans, Easy Eye
8	Jazmine Sullivan	Heaux Tales	RCA
8	Mac Ayres	Magic 8ball	Dixon Court
11	(G)I-dle	I Burn	Cube, Republic, Kakao M
13	Healy	Tungsten	RCA
15	Quinton Barnes	As a Motherfucker	Grimalkin
15	Zayn	Nobody Is Listening	RCA
18	U-Know Yunho	Noir	SM, Dreamus
20	Baekhyun	Baekhyun	Avex Trax, SM
22	Ayra Starr	Ayra Starr	Mavin Records
22	Erick the Architect	Future Proof	Self-released
29	Arlo Parks	Collapsed in Sunbeams	Transgressive
29	Buzzy Lee	Spoiled Love	Future Classic
29	Celeste	Not Your Muse	Both Sides, Polydor

=== February ===
Day	Artist(s)	Album	Record label(s)
5	Puma Blue	In Praise of Shadows	Blue Flowers Music
5	The Weeknd	The Highlights	XO, Republic
5	VanJess	Homegrown	Keep Cool, RCA
12	Dixson	Darling	Roc Nation
12	JPEGMafia	EP2!	Republic
12	Lucky Daye	Table for Two	Keep Cool, RCA
12	Pink Sweats	Pink Planet	Atlantic Records
12	Robin Thicke	On Earth, and in Heaven	Lucky Music, Empire
12	Todrick Hall	Haus Party, Pt. 3	Self-released
17	NCT 127	Loveholic	Avex Trax
19	I.M	Duality	Starship
19	Tash Sultana	Terra Firma	Lonely Lands, Sony Music Australia
19	Venerus	Magica Musica	Asian Fake, Sony Music Italy
22	Shinee	Don't Call Me	SM
24	Ai	It's All Me, Vol. 2	EMI, Universal
26	Adrian Younge	The American Negro	Jazz is Dead
26	C. Tangana	El Madrileño	Sony Spain
26	Madison Beer	Life Support	Access, Epic
26	Roosevelt	Polydans	City Slang, Greco-Roman
26	Sam Dew	Moonlit Fools	RCA
26	Wonho	Love Synonym Pt.2: Right for Us	Highline, Kakao M

=== March ===
Day	Artist(s)	Album	Record label(s)
4	Kìzis	Tidibàbide / Turn	Tin Angel
5	Chase Atlantic	Beauty in Death	Fearless
5	Gabrielle	Do It Again	BMG
5	Genesis Owusu	Smiling with No Teeth	Ourness, House Anxiety
5	Mr. Mitch	Lazy	Gobstopper
5	Noemi	Metamorfosi	Sony Music
5	Sipho Dlamini	Rhythms of Zamunda	Def Jam Recordings Africa
5	Tory Lanez	Playboy	One Umbrella Records
5	Zara Larsson	Poster Girl	TEN, Epic
8	BDC	The Intersection: Discovery	Brand New Music, Kakao
10	WayV	Kick Back	Label V, SM, Dreamus
12	DPR Ian	Moodswings in This Order	Dream Perfect Regime
12	Giveon	When It's All Said And Done... Take Time	Epic
12	Lake Street Dive	Obviously	Nonesuch
12	Nick Jonas	Spaceman	Island
12	Nubiyan Twist	Freedom Fables	Strut
12	Raissa	Herogirl	Zelig, Columbia
12	Renata Flores	Isqun	Self-released
12	Selena Gomez	Revelación	Interscope
12	Tiggs Da Author	Blame It on the Youts	Alacran, ONErpm
15	Pentagon	Love or Take	Cube
15	Purple Kiss	Into Violet	RBW, Kakao
15	Sananda Maitreya	Pandora's PlayHouse	Treehouse Publishing
18	Paloma Mami	Sueños de Dalí	Sony Music US Latin
19	Jon Batiste	We Are	Verve
19	Joyce Wrice	Overgrown	Self-released
19	Justin Bieber	Justice	Def Jam, RBMG, Schoolboy
19	Madame	Madame	Sugar Music
19	Paul Stanley's Soul Station	Now and Then	UMG
23	Klein	Now that’s what i call r&b	Self-released
26	Budjerah	Budjerah	Warner Music Australia
26	Dante Bowe	Circles	Bethel Music
26	Gallant	Neptune	Empire
26	Rod Wave	SoulFly	Alamo
26	Serpentwithfeet	Deacon	Secretly Canadian
30	Baekhyun	Bambi	SM

=== April ===
Day	Artist(s)	Album	Record label(s)
2	Mr. P	The Prodigal	P.Classic Records
4	Justin Bieber	Freedom	Def Jam
9	Benny Sings	Music	Stones Throw
9	Jordan Rakei	Late Night Tales: Jordan Rakei	Night Time Stories
9	Nick Waterhouse	Promenade Blue	Innovative Leisure
13	Wheein	Redd	RBW
16	AJ Tracey	Flu Game	Revenge Records
16	Nick Hakim & Roy Nathanson	Small Things	NYXO
23	Alfa Mist	Bring Backs	Anti
23	Charlotte Cardin	Phoenix	Atlantic
23	Steve Cropper	Fire It Up	Mascot Label Group, Provogue
26	Enhypen	Border: Carnival	Belift Lab, Genie, Stone
28	Bibi	Life Is a Bi...	Feel Ghood
28	Morray	Street Sermons	Pick Six, Interscope
30	Dawn Richard	Second Line	Merge Records
30	Itzy	Guess Who	JYP, Dreamus
30	Marilyn McCoo & Billy Davis Jr.	Blackbird Lennon-McCartney Icons	BMG
30	Rochelle Jordan	Play with the Changes	Young Art Records
30	Shelley FKA DRAM	Shelley FKA DRAM	Atlantic, Empire
30	Ya Tseen	Indian Yard	Sub Pop

=== May ===
Day	Artist(s)	Album	Record label(s)
3	Yesung	Beautiful Night	SM, Label SJ
7	Ailee	Lovin'	Rocket3 Entertainment, Dreamus
7	Natalie Bergman	Mercy	Third Man Records
7	Rag'n'Bone Man	Life by Misadventure	Columbia
7	Tony Allen	There Is No End	Decca Records France
7	Van Morrison	Latest Record Project, Volume 1	Exile Productions, BMG
10	NCT Dream	Hot Sauce	SM
14	Alaina Castillo	Parallel Universe Pt. 1	Chosen People, AWAL
14	Jorja Smith	Be Right Back	Famm
14	Morcheeba	Blackest Blue	Skye & Ross
18	Taemin	Advice	SM
21	Abhir Hathi	Lazos y Nudos	Dale Play, StepRecords
21	Audrey Nuna	A Liquid Breakfast	Arista Records
21	Blxckie	B4Now	M4 Entertainment
21	Chai	Wink	Sub Pop, Otemayon
21	Erika de Casier	Sensational	4AD
21	Georgia Anne Muldrow	Vweto III	Foreseen, Epistrophik Peach
21	Qveen Herby	A Woman	Checkbook Records
21	Robert Finley	Sharecropper's Son	Easy Eye
21	Sinéad Harnett	Ready Is Always Too Late	Thairish Limited
26	Mereba	Azeb	Interscope
28	Easy Life	Life's a Beach	Island
28	Mustafa	When Smoke Rises	Regent Park Songs
28	Various artists	Get on Board the Soul Train: The Sound of Philadelphia International Records, Vol. 1	Philadelphia International

=== June ===
Day	Artist(s)	Album	Record label(s)
1	Monsta X	One of a Kind	Starship, Kakao
4	Apollo Brown & Raheem DeVaughn	Lovesick	Mello Music Group
4	Fousheé	Time Machine	Trackmasters, RCA
4	Greentea Peng	Man Made	AMF Records, Universal
4	Left at London	T.I.A.P.F.Y.H.	Fourth Strike
4	Mndsgn	Rare Pleasure	Stones Throw
4	Project Moonman	Gemini	O/C Records
7	Exo	Don't Fight the Feeling	SM, Dreamus
10	Mahmood	Ghettolimpo	Island
11	Emotional Oranges	The Juicebox	Avant Garden, 4th & Broadway, UMG
11	Jesse Royal	Royal	Easy Star Records
11	Ruth B.	Moments in Between	BMG
15	BamBam	Ribbon	Abyss Company
17	Yugyeom	Point of View: U	AOMG
18	H.E.R.	Back of My Mind	RCA
18	Maverick City Music	Jubilee: Juneteenth Edition	Tribl
18	Seventeen	Your Choice	Pledis, YG Plus
25	Cautious Clay	Deadpan Love	Self-released
25	Doja Cat	Planet Her	Kemosabe, RCA
25	Faye Webster	I Know I'm Funny haha	Secretly Canadian
25	Hiatus Kaiyote	Mood Valiant	Brainfeeder
25	Jimmie Allen	Bettie James Gold Edition	Stoney Creek
25	Justine Skye	Space & Time	Nynetineth
25	L'Rain	Fatigue	Mexican Summer
25	Sault	Nine	Forever Living Originals
28	2PM	Must	JYP, Dreamus
28	Loona	[&]	Blockberry Creative, Universal Music Japan

=== July ===
Day	Artist(s)	Album	Record label(s)
2	Cosha	Mt. Pleasant	Ashtown Lane
2	Laura Mvula	Pink Noise	Atlantic
9	Charlotte Day Wilson	Alpha	Stone Woman
9	Jimmy Jam and Terry Lewis	Jam & Lewis: Volume One	Flyte Tyme, BMG
9	Mariah the Scientist	Ry Ry World	One Umbrella, RCA
9	Rejjie Snow	Baw Baw Black Sheep	Honeymoon, +1 Records
9	Snoh Aalegra	Temporary Highs in the Violet Skies	ARTium, Roc Nation
9	Tkay Maidza	Last Year Was Weird (Vol. 3)	4AD
9	Various artists	Space Jam: A New Legacy (Original Motion Picture Soundtrack)	Republic, WaterTower
16	Chet Faker	Hotel Surrender	Detail Records, BMG
16	Enny	Under Twenty Five	Famm
16	Instupendo	Love Power A-to-Z	Self-released
18	Luísa Sonza	Doce 22	Universal
23	Joel Culpepper	Sgt Culpepper	Pepper
23	Leon Bridges	Gold-Diggers Sound	Columbia
23	Peyton	PSA	Stones Throw
23	Yung Bleu	Moon Boy	Vandross, Empire
26	D.O.	Empathy	SM Entertainment
30	Billie Eilish	Happier Than Ever	Darkroom, Interscope
30	Durand Jones & The Indications	Private Space	Dead Oceans
30	Isaiah Rashad	The House Is Burning	Top Dawg, Warner
30	Leela James	See Me	Shesangz, BMG
30	Prince	Welcome 2 America	NPG
30	Tink	Heat of the Moment	Winter's Diary, Empire
30	Yola	Stand for Myself	Easy Eye Sound, Concord

=== August ===
Day	Artist(s)	Album	Record label(s)
6	Ayra Starr	19 & Dangerous	Mavin
6	The Steoples	Wide Through The Eyes Of No One	Stones Throw
6	Tinashe	333	Self-released
6	Youngn Lipz	Area Baby	Biordi Music
13	Brandee Younger	Somewhere Different	Impulse!, Verve
13	Iggy Azalea	The End of an Era	Bad Dreams, Empire
13	Jennifer Hudson	Respect: Original Motion Picture Soundtrack	Epic, MGM
13	Jungle	Loving in Stereo	Caiola, AWAL
13	Still Woozy	If This Isn't Nice, I Don't Know What Is	Interscope
16	Red Velvet	Queendom	SM, Dreamus
17	CIX	OK Prologue: Be OK	C9 Entertainment
17	Gray	Grayground	AOMG
19	Marina Sena	De Primeira	Alá Comunicação e Cultura, A Quadrilha
20	Anderson East	Maybe We Never Die	Low Country Sound, Elektra
20	Cleo Sol	Mother	Forever Living Originals
20	Dvsn & Ty Dolla Sign	Cheers to the Best Memories	OVO Sound, Warner
20	Kool & the Gang	Perfect Union	Omnivore
20	Maggie Rose	Have a Seat	Starstruck
20	Quickly, Quickly	The Long and Short of It	Ghostly International
23	Joel Culpepper	Sgt Culpepper	Pepper Records
23	Stray Kids	Noeasy	JYP
26	Jay B	SOMO:Fume	H1ghr Music, Warner Music Korea
27	Eyedress	Mulholland Drive	Lex
27	Ngaiire	3	Dot Dash, Majestic Casual

=== September ===
Day	Artist(s)	Album	Record label(s)
2	Monogem	Gardenia	Self-released
3	88rising	Shang-Chi and the Legend of the Ten Rings: The Album	Hollywood, Marvel Music, Interscope
3	Cory Wong & Dirty Loops	Turbo	Roundwound
3	Drake	Certified Lover Boy	OVO, Republic
3	Duckwrth	SG8*	SuperGood, The Blind Youth
3	Jenevieve	Division	Joyface, Interscope
3	JMSN	Heals Me	White Room Records
3	Johnny Drille	Before We Fall Asleep	Mavin
3	Little Simz	Sometimes I Might Be Introvert	Age 101 Music, AWAL
3	Priya Ragu	Damnshestamil	Warner
6	Young K	Eternal	Studio J, JYP
9	Hyuna & Dawn	1+1=1	P Nation, Kakao
9	Lee Hi	4 Only	AOMG
9	Liniker	Indigo borboleta anil	Self-released
10	Eric Bellinger	New Light	YFS, Empire
10	Romeo Santos	Utopía Live from MetLife Stadium	Sony Latin
10	Samantha Fish	Faster	Rounder
10	Spencer.	Are U Down?	4AD
10	Yebba	Dawn	RCA
15	Sumin & Slom	Miniseries	EMA
15	Tems	If Orange Was a Place	Since '93, RCA
17	Cynthia Erivo	Ch. 1 Vs. 1	Verve
17	James Vincent McMorrow	Grapefruit Season	Sony
17	Jordan Rakei	What We Call Life	Ninja Tune
17	NCT 127	Sticker	SM
17	Sevyn Streeter	Drunken Wordz Sober Thoughtz	TStreetz, Groundwērk, eOne
17	Stokley	Sankofa	Bluraffe, Flyte Tyme, Perspective
24	Alessia Cara	In the Meantime	Def Jam
24	Alina Baraz	Sunbeam	Self-released
24	Anthony Hamilton	Love is the New Black	My Music Box, BMG
24	Nao	And Then Life Was Beautiful	RCA, Little Tokyo, Sony

=== October ===
Day	Artist(s)	Album	Record label(s)
1	JoJo	Trying Not to Think About It	Warner
1	Ray BLK	Access Denied	Island
1	Ryan Trey	A 64 East Saga	Interscope
1	Tirzah	Colourgrade	Domino
5	Youngjae	Colors from Ars	Sublime Artist Agency
7	BGYO	The Light	Star Music
8	Don Toliver	Life of a Don	Cactus Jack, Atlantic, We Run It
8	James Blake	Friends That Break Your Heart	Republic, Polydor
8	Upsahl	Lady Jesus	Arista
12	Enhypen	Dimension: Dilemma	Belift Lab, Genie, Stone
15	Joy Crookes	Skin	Sony, Insanity, Speakerbox
15	Kacy Hill	Simple, Sweet, and Smiling	Self-released
15	Kirby	Sis. He Wasn't the One	Self-released
15	Kirk Knight	After Dark	Blacksmith
15	PinkPantheress	To Hell with It	Parlophone, Elektra
15	Remi Wolf	Juno	Island
19	Nam Woo-hyun	With	Woollim
20	CL	Alpha	Very Cherry, Sony
22	Majid Jordan	Wildest Dreams	OVO Sound, Warner Bros.
22	Seventeen	Attacca	Pledis, YG Plus
22	Sogumm	Precious	AOMG
22	Wet	Letter Blue	AWAL
28	Nicki Nicole	Parte de Mí	Dale Play, Sony Latin
29	Alfred García	1997	Universal Music Spain
29	Alina Baraz	Moongate	Self-released
29	Hak Baker	Misled	AWAL
29	Nightmares on Wax	Shout Out! To Freedom...	Warp
29	Swindle	The New World	BMG
29	Thuy	I Hope U See This	Self-released
29	Various artists	The Harder They Fall (The Motion Picture Soundtrack)	Roc Nation
31	Corbin	Ghost With Skin	Self-released

=== November ===
Day	Artist(s)	Album	Record label(s)
5	Curtis Harding	If Words Were Flowers	Anti
5	Diana Ross	Thank You	Decca
5	Dijon	Absolutely	R&R, Warner Records
5	Joan As Police Woman, Tony Allen & Dave Okumu	The Solution Is Restless	PIAS Recordings
5	Katy B	Peace and Offerings	Rinse
5	Lauren Jauregui	Prelude	Attunement, AWAL
5	Nathaniel Rateliff & the Night Sweats	The Future	Stax
5	Summer Walker	Still Over It	LVRN, Interscope
5	Terrace Martin	Drones	Sounds of Crenshaw
10	Ca7riel	El Disko	Clix
12	Aries	Believe in Me, Who Believes in You	Wunderworld
12	Manu Gavassi	Gracinha	Universal
12	Sega Bodega	Romeo	Nuxxe
12	Silk Sonic	An Evening with Silk Sonic	Aftermath, Atlantic
18	Weki Meki	I Am Me.	Fantagio, Kakao M
19	Adele	30	Columbia
19	Alewya	Panther in Mode	Because London
19	Bryson Tiller	A Different Christmas	RCA
19	Galdive	Canvas	Avoca Drive, Sony Music Australia
19	Jean Deaux	Most Wanted	Duality, Empire
19	Monsta X	No Limit	Starship, Kakao
19	Muni Long	Public Displays of Affection	Supergiant, Def Jam
19	Snoop Dogg	Algorithm	Doggy Style, Def Jam
24	W-inds	20XX: We Are	Flight Master
30	Kai	Peaches	SM, Dreamus

=== December ===
Day	Artist(s)	Album	Record label(s)
2	Alicia Keys	Keys	RCA
2	Arca	Kick IIII	XL
3	Khalid	Scenic Drive	RCA
3	Marco Mengoni	Materia (Terra)	Sony Music Italy
3	No Rome	It's All Smiles	Dirty Hit
6	Koda Kumi	Best: 2000–2020	Rhythm Zone
7	Greg Han	Greg Han	Pourquoi Pas
10	Moses Sumney	Live from Blackalachia	Jagjaguwar, Tuntum
10	Seyi Shay	Big Girl	Stargurl Limited, Jones Worldwide
10	Tory Lanez	Alone at Prom	One Umbrella, Create
12	Tia Ray	Once Upon a Moon	Warner China
14	NCT	Universe	SM, Dreamus
16	Tierra Whack	R&B?	Interscope
17	Various artists	Sing 2: Original Motion Picture Soundtrack	Republic
24	William Wei	I'm More Sober When I'm Drunk	The Orchard

== Highest-charting songs ==
=== United States ===
R&B songs from any year which charted in the 2021 Top 40 of the Billboard Hot 100
Song	Artist	Project	Peak position
"Leave the Door Open"	Silk Sonic	An Evening with Silk Sonic	1
"Easy on Me"	Adele	30	1
"Peaches"	Justin Bieber featuring Daniel Caesar and Giveon	Justice	1
"Save Your Tears"	The Weeknd and Ariana Grande	After Hours	1
"34+35"	Ariana Grande featuring Doja Cat and Megan Thee Stallion	Positions	2
"Go Crazy"	Chris Brown and Young Thug	Slime & B	3
"Kiss Me More"	Doja Cat featuring SZA	Planet Her	3
"Smokin out the Window"	Silk Sonic	An Evening with Silk Sonic	5
"Oh My God"	Adele	30	5
"Take My Breath"	The Weeknd	Dawn FM	6
"I Hate U"	SZA	SOS	7
"Good Days"	SZA	SOS	9
"Essence"	Wizkid featuring Tems	Made in Lagos	9
"You Right"	Doja Cat and the Weeknd	Planet Her	11
"No Love"	Summer Walker and SZA	Still Over It	13
"Wild Side"	Normani featuring Cardi B	Dopamine	14
"Skate"	Silk Sonic	An Evening with Silk Sonic	14
"Streets"	Doja Cat	Hot Pink	16
"Heartbreak Anniversary"	Giveon	Take Time	16
"You're Mines Still"	Yung Bleu featuring Drake	Love Scars: The 5 Stages of Emotions	18
"Race My Mind"	Drake	Certified Lover Boy	18
"I Drink Wine"	Adele	30	18
"My Little Love"	Adele	30	23
"Yebba's Heartbreak"	Drake and Yebba	Certified Lover Boy	24
"Telepatía"	Kali Uchis	Sin Miedo (del Amor y Otros Demonios)	25
"Bitter"	Summer Walker and Cardi B	Still Over It	25
"Can I Get It"	Adele	30	26
"Fountains"	Drake featuring Tems	Certified Lover Boy	26
"Get Along Better"	Drake featuring Ty Dolla Sign	Certified Lover Boy	27
"POV"	Ariana Grande	Positions	27
"Have Mercy"	Chlöe	—N/a	28
"Fucking Fans"	Drake	Certified Lover Boy	32
"To Be Loved"	Adele	30	32
"Ex for a Reason"	Summer Walker and JT	Still Over It	33

=== United Kingdom ===
R&B songs from any year which charted in the 2021 Top 10 of the UK Singles Chart
Song	Artist	Project	Peak position
"Easy on Me"	Adele	30	1
"Oh My God"	Adele	30	2
"I Drink Wine"	Adele	30	4
"Boyz"	Jesy Nelson featuring Nicki Minaj	—N/a	4

== Highest first-week consumption ==
List of albums with the highest first-week consumption (sales + streaming + track equivalent), as of December 2021 in the United States
Number	Album	Artist	1st-week consumption	1st-week position	Refs
1	30	Adele	839,000	1	
2	Still Over It	Summer Walker	166,000	1	
3	SoulFly	Rod Wave	130,000	1	
4	Planet Her	Doja Cat	109,000	2	
5	An Evening with Silk Sonic	Silk Sonic	104,000	2	
6	The Highlights	The Weeknd	89,000	2	
7	Welcome 2 America	Prince	55,000	4	
8	Heaux Tales	Jazmine Sullivan	43,000	4	
9	Back of My Mind	H.E.R.	36,000	6	
10	When It's All Said and Done... Take Time	Giveon	32,000	5	

== All critically reviewed albums ranked ==
=== Metacritic ===
Number	Artist	Album	Average score	Number of reviews	Reference
1	Ray BLK	Access Denied	92	5 reviews	
2	Laura Mvula	Pink Noise	89	11 reviews	
3	Sault	Nine	88	8 reviews	
4	Jordan Rakei	What We Call Life	87	4 reviews	
5	serpentwithfeet	Deacon	86	16 reviews	
6	PinkPantheress	To Hell with It	86	10 reviews	
7	Rochelle Jordan	Play with the Changes	86	5 reviews	
8	Nao	And Then Life Was Beautiful	85	9 reviews	
9	Summer Walker	Still Over It	85	8 reviews	
10	Hiatus Kaiyote	Mood Valiant	84	7 reviews	
11	Curtis Harding	If Words Were Flowers	84	5 reviews	
12	Tinashe	333	84	5 reviews	
13	Spencer.	Are U Down?	84	4 reviews	
14	Silk Sonic	An Evening with Silk Sonic	83	15 reviews	
15	Lake Street Dive	Obviously	83	6 reviews	
16	Various artists	Get on Board the Soul Train: The Sound of Philadelphia International Records, Vol. 1	83	5 reviews	
17	Leon Bridges	Gold-Diggers Sound	81	12 reviews	
18	Celeste	Not Your Muse	81	10 reviews	
19	Jazmine Sullivan	Heaux Tales	81	9 reviews	
20	Aaron Frazer	Introducing...	81	6 reviews	
21	Puma Blue	In Praise of Shadows	81	5 reviews	
22	Dawn Richard	Second Line	80	12 reviews	
23	Durand Jones & The Indications	Private Space	80	9 reviews	
24	Nick Waterhouse	Promenade Blue	80	6 reviews	
25	Alessia Cara	In the Meantime	80	5 reviews	
26	Nightmares on Wax	Shout Out! To Freedom...	80	4 reviews	
27	Nathaniel Rateliff & the Night Sweats	The Future	79	8 reviews	
28	Charlotte Day Wilson	Alpha	79	4 reviews	
29	Erika de Casier	Sensational	78	8 reviews	
30	Natalie Bergman	Mercy	78	4 reviews	
31	Snoh Aalegra	Temporary Highs in the Violet Skies	77	7 reviews	
32	Jimmy Jam and Terry Lewis	Jam & Lewis, Volume One	77	4 reviews	
33	Prince	Welcome 2 America	76	16 reviews	
34	Tony Allen	There Is No End	75	9 reviews	
35	H.E.R.	Back of My Mind	75	7 reviews	
36	Samantha Fish	Faster	75	5 reviews	
37	Tash Sultana	Terra Firma	74	5 reviews	
38	Alfa Mist	Bring Backs	74	4 reviews	
39	Jorja Smith	Be Right Back	73	9 reviews	
40	Georgia Anne Muldrow	Vweto III	72	6 reviews	
41	Nubiyan Twist	Freedom Fables	69	5 reviews	
42	Steve Cropper	Fire It Up	66	5 reviews	
43	Alicia Keys	Keys	65	11 reviews	
44	Adrian Younge	The American Negro	64	4 reviews	
45	Diana Ross	Thank You	60	11 reviews	
46	Khalid	Scenic Drive	58	4 reviews	

== See also ==
- Previous article: 2020 in rhythm and blues
- Next article: 2022 in rhythm and blues
