= Sevana =

Jamaican singer and actress

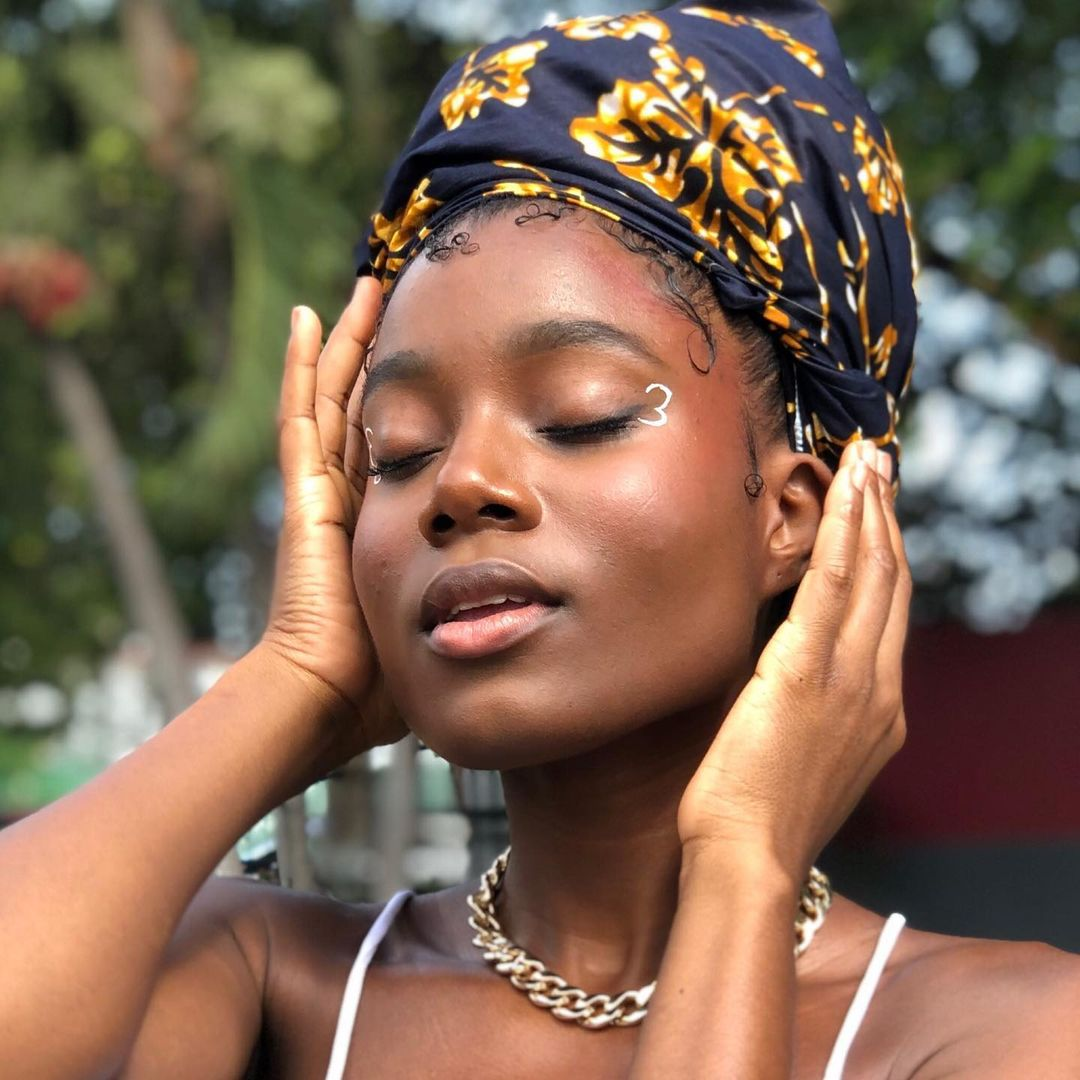
- Sevana in 2025

Background information
- Also known as: Sevana Siren
- Born: Anna-Sharé Blake; 21 November 1991 (age 34); Savanna-la-Mar, Jamaica
- Years active: 2014–present
- Labels: GoodhzMusic; In.Digg.Nation; RCA

Anna-Sharé Blake (born November 21, 1991), known professionally as Sevana, is a Jamaican singer and actress. Sevana released her self-titled EP in 2016, as part of her former label In.Digg.Nation Collective. She made her major label debut in 2020 with Be Somebody.

== Life and career ==
=== 1991–2014: Early life ===
Sevana was born Anna-Sharé Blake in Savanna-la-Mar, Westmoreland, Jamaica, in 1991. When she was young, she was originally interested in becoming a doctor. In 2008, at 16 years old, Sevana entered the local music competition Digicel Rising Stars with two friends from her school and formed the girl group SLR. Their group advanced into the top ten of the competition and ultimately placed in third. SLR broke up the next year in 2009, and Sevana went on a hiatus from music. During her hiatus, Sevana worked several jobs as a customer service agent, social media coordinator, and waitress after graduating from Manning's School.

=== 2014–2020: Early releases ===
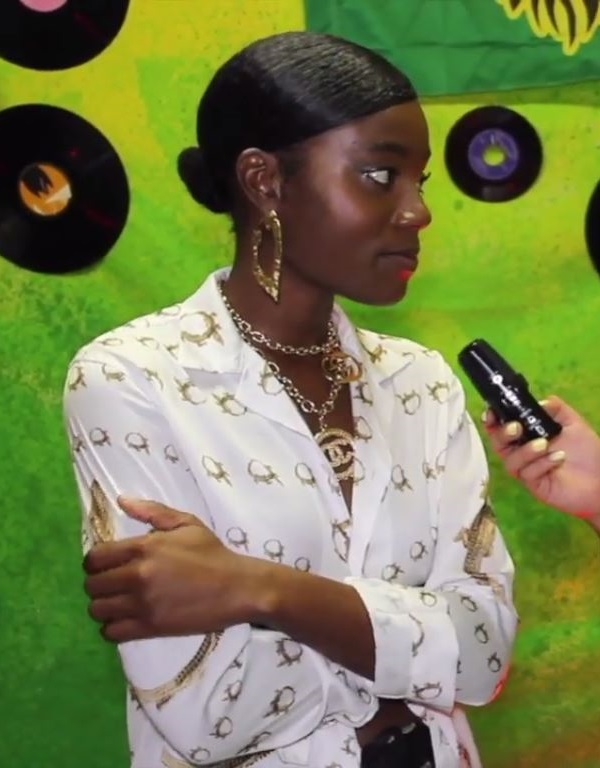
Sevana in 2019

Sevana resumed writing and performing music in 2014. Later that year, she was featured on reggae singer Protoje's "Sudden Flight" on his album Ancient Future. She also began to regularly appear with his group, In.Digg.Nation, in live performances and later toured with them in July 2015. In April 2015, Protoje signed Sevana under his In.Digg.Nation Collective label. Sevana released her eponymous EP in 2016, and embarked on a European tour. After the release, in 2016, she played the lead role in the Television Jamaica mini web series, Losing Patience. She later collaborated with the creators of Losing Patience for the music video of her 2018 single "Justice", on the effects of climate change on the environment.

=== 2020–present: Be Somebody ===
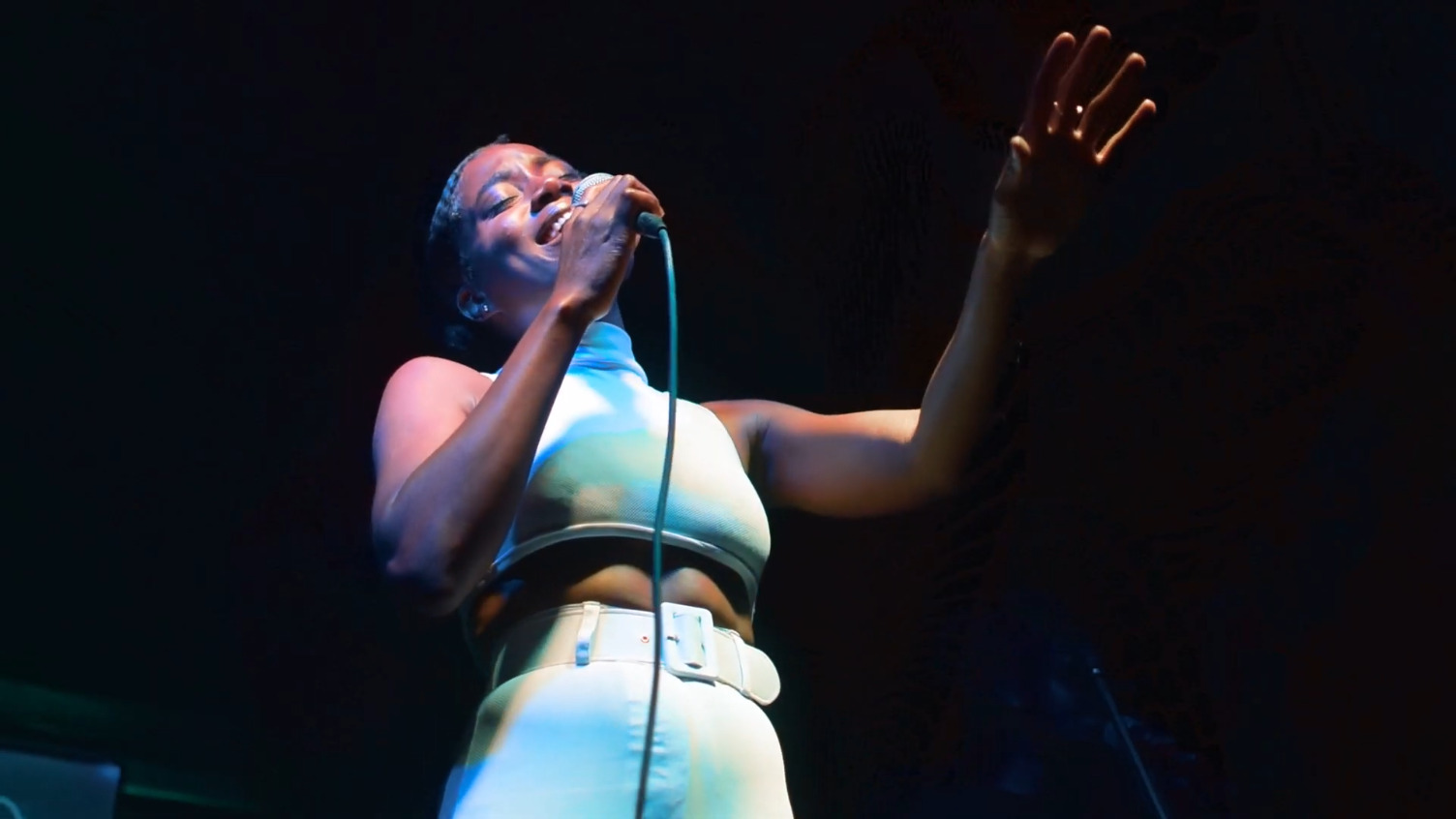
Sevana performing in 2020

Sevana halted touring plans in 2020 due to the COVID-19 pandemic. In April 2020, In.Digg.Nation Collective entered into a record deal with RCA Records and Six Course Media Group, through which music by In.Digg.Nation musicians Protoje, Lila Iké, and Sevana would be released. In May, Sevana appeared with Freddie McGregor on Digicel Unplugged, an online performance series.

In July 2020, Sevana released "If You Only Knew", the first single on Be Somebody, her second EP and her major label debut. Later that month, Sevana released Be Somebody, with a DancehallMag reviewer praising her "sultry vocals and strong musical range." In 2021, NPR aired Sevana's Tiny Desk Concert performance, which included songs from Be Somebody.

Sevana performed to a virtual audience at the Jamaica Jazz and Blues Festival in March 2021. Following a traffic accident in May 2021, Sevana was charged with dangerous driving a month later. She pled guilty to the charge at the trial in October and was fined $300,000 the following month. In March 2022, Sevana announced her departure from In.Digg.Nation Collective to join label Goodhzmusic.

In February 2022, Sevana was cast as the reggae artist Judy Mowatt in the 2024 biopic Bob Marley: One Love. Mowatt was a member of the I-Threes, a trio of backing vocalists for Bob Marley & The Wailers.

== Artistry ==
Media outlets have described Sevana's music, or its influences, as reggae, soul, R&B, and dancehall. (Note: DancehallMag in 2020 stated that Sevana's music was influenced by soul and R&B music; in 2021, NPR described her as a soul singer, and The Recording Academy named her among "the women essential to reggae and dancehall".) In a 2020 interview, Sevana described her musical sound as "every sound but with a Jamaican filter. Like if a modern Anita Baker was Jamaican and was creating music for Jamaica."

Speaking with The Jamaica Star in 2020, Sevana stated her desire to "use her artistry to teach dark-skinned young girls and women to love the skin they're in." She cites Celine Dion as her biggest influence and Beres Hammond as a source of inspiration.

== Discography ==
=== Extended plays ===
- Sevana (2016)
- Be Somebody (2020)

=== Singles ===
- "Sudden Flight" by Protoje (featuring Jesse Royal and Sevana) (2014)
- "Justice" (2018)
- "Sometime Love" (2018)
- "Nobody Man" (2019)
- "If You Only Knew" (2020)
- "Mango" (2020)
- "Brand New" (2022)
- "Keep Going (Chosen)" (2024)
