= Trisha Cee =

South Sudanese artist and activist

- Cee in 2017

Background information
- Birth name: Hilu Beatrice Commas
- Born: Juba, South Sudan
- Died: March 29, 2021 (aged 26); Juba, South Sudan
- Genres: Afro, R&B
- Occupation(s): Singer, songwriter and advocate
- Years active: 2014 - 2021

Hilu Beatrice Cosmas (died 29 March 2021; stage-name Trisha Cee) was a South Sudanese female artist and activist who was advocating for girls' education in South Sudan and member of Anataban Campaign. She died in 2021 after a vehicle collision in Juba.

== Early life ==
She was born as Hilu Beatrice Cosmas, as the only child to her mother Mama Jokudu Joyce.

== Career and activism ==
Cee started her musical career in early 2014 and collaborated with South Sudanese artists WJ de King, Silver X, Dynamq, and Star Eagles. Her discography included the single Salai, a collaboration with Kebas and Hibu Ita, featuring One Pound. She worked with manager Sabuni Pakalast.

Cee was a member of the Anataban Campaign, an artist collective social justice advocacy group.

== Death ==
Cee died on March 29, 2021, after the boda boda she was travelling was run over by a water truck at around 4pm. The boda boda rider died instantly, and Cee was taken to hospital. She was initially taken to Juba Teaching Hospital, before being transferred to a private health clinic.

Her friends accused the hospital of failing to provide any treatment for three or four hours, sparking public protests about road safety and the quality of care at the teaching hospital. Complaints included the lack of availability of the hospital's blood bank outside daytime hours. Groups joining the protest included the Foundation for Democracy and Accountable Governance and OKAY Africa.

Fourteen people were arrested near the Mobil Roundabout in Juba, and the Anataban Campaign called for the release of those arrested. A joint statement by the European Union, France, Germany, Sweden, and the Netherlands was critical of what it called the police's “unnecessary and disproportionate” use of force.

Cee was buried in Joppa, Juba.
