= Manasseh Mathiang =

South Sudanese musician and activist

- Born: Manasseh Mathiang; South Sudan
- Occupations: Musician, activist
- Years active: 2000s–present
- Organization(s): Anataban Campaign, Hagiga Ltd
- Known for: Founder of Anataban Campaign, Executive Director of Hagiga Ltd

Manasseh Mathiang is a South Sudanese musician and human rights activist. Having made a living as a musician for many years, in 2021 he was exiled from South Sudan for criticizing the government. In response, he began using his music to solely to promote activism and, together with other exiled South Sudanese artists, formed Anataban, meaning “I am tired” in Arabic. For his criticism of the government, Mathiang has remained a fugitive and is often forced to flee. He currently operates out of Nairobi, Kenya where he serves as executive director of Hagiga Ltd, an NGO aimed at promoting freedom of expression through art.

== Activism and the Anataban Campaign ==
After his exile from South Sudan in 2021 due to public criticism of the government, Manasseh Mathiang focused his music exclusively on activism. He became one of the founding members of the Anataban Campaign, a collective of South Sudanese artists committed to promoting peace, social justice, and civic engagement through art. The name "Anataban" means "I am tired" in Arabic, expressing the frustration of young people with ongoing violence and corruption in the country.

Established in 2016, the Anataban Campaign uses music, murals, street performances, and digital media to raise awareness of human rights issues. The group has been credited with mobilizing youth through creative expression and influencing public discourse on accountability and good governance in South Sudan.

Following his departure from South Sudan, Mathiang relocated to Nairobi, Kenya, where he leads Hagiga Ltd., an organization aimed at creating a platform for exiled and local artists to challenge censorship and advocate for democratic values.
