= Through the Wall =

Through The Wall

Studio album by Rochelle Jordan
- Released: September 26, 2025
- Genres: House; alternative R&B; dance-pop
- Length: 59:58
- Label: Empire
- Producers: Rob Araujo; Byron the Aquarius; Dam-Funk; Hamdi; Terry Hunter; Initial Talk; Jimmy Edgar; Kaytranada; Kingdom; KLSH; Machinedrum; MpH; WaveIQ; Paris Williams

Rochelle Jordan chronology
| Play with the Changes (2021) | Through The Wall (2025) |

Singles from Through The Wall
- 1. "Crave" Released: May 30, 2025; 2. "TTW" Released: July 11, 2025; 3. "Doing It Too" Released: August 8, 2025; 4. "Sweet Sensation" Released: September 12, 2025

Through the Wall is the third studio album by British-Canadian singer Rochelle Jordan. It was released on September 26, 2025, via Empire, and was supported by the singles "Crave", "TTW", "Doing It Too", and "Sweet Sensation".

== Release and promotion ==
Jordan came up with the album's title in 2022, stating that it signified "breaking down the walls of her own mind to understand that I deserve to be here, and I am here, and I’m an icon." Jordan released the single "Crave" on May 30, 2025. On July 11, 2025, she announced the album and released its title track, "TTW". "Doing It Too" was released as the album's third single on August 8, 2025. Jordan released the album's fourth single, "Sweet Sensation", on September 12, 2025. The album released on September 26, 2025.

She performed the song "Ladida" on Good Morning America in her national television debut. She toured North America in the autumn of 2025 in support of the album. The tour sold out, prompting her to expand the tour to Europe in February 2026 and to North America from March to April 2026. She released a music video for "Doing It Too" on April 1, 2026.

== Critical reception ==
Professional ratings
Aggregate scores
| Source | Rating |
|---|---|
| Metacritic | 90/100 |
Review scores
| Source | Rating |
| AllMusic | 4.5/5 stars |
| The Line of Best Fit | 9/10 |
| Pitchfork | 8.3/10 |

According to the review aggregator Metacritic, Through the Wall received "universal acclaim" based on a weighted average score of 90 out of 100 from 5 critic scores.

Kiana Fitzgerald of Consequence praised the album as a "daring fusion of alt-R&B and pulsating house/electronic". The Fader's Shamira Ibrahim praised the album as having a "a sleekly produced sound that braids together dance music and R&B via the funk and soul that anchor both genres." Melody Lau of CBC wrote that the album "evokes the cool confidence of Janet Jackson, the buttery smooth vocals of Mariah Carey and combines it with R&B, electronic and house influences." Writing for Vogue, Liam Hess praised the album as a "a ravishing love letter to house music artfully braided with odes to the cream of '80s pop and '90s R&B." The Line of Best Fit's Sam Franzini described the album's production as "vigorous" and "fierce". Writing for Pitchfork, Gio Santiago described the album as having "controlled tempos, velvet hooks, and a vocal style that prefers precision to pyrotechnics". Double J's Dan Condon praised the album's lyricism as "straightforward but emotive — often deeply relatable."

=== Rankings ===
| Publication | Accolade | Rank | Ref. |
|---|---|---|---|
| Beats Per Minute | Top 50 Albums of 2025 | 36 | |
| Billboard | The 25 Best Dance Albums of 2025 | 13 | |
| CBC | The 10 best Canadian albums of 2025 | 3 | |
| Clash | Albums Of The Year 2025 | 13 | |
| Consequence | The 50 Best Albums of 2025 | 30 | |
| Double J | The best albums of 2025 | 34 | |
| The Fader | The 50 best albums of 2025 | 2 | |
| The Guardian | The 50 best albums of 2025 | 49 | |
| Harper's Bazaar | The 12 Best Albums of 2025 | 12 | |
| NME | The 50 best albums of 2025 | 37 | |
| Nylon | Top 10 Albums Of 2025 | —N/a | |
| Paste | The 50 best albums of 2025 | 8 | |
| Pitchfork | The 50 Best Albums of 2025 | 25 | |
| Pitchfork | The 30 Best Pop Albums of 2025 | 8 | |
| Vogue | The 45 Best Albums of 2025 | —N/a | |

=== Awards ===
| Publication | Accolade | Rank | Ref. |
|---|---|---|---|
| 2026 Polaris Music Prize | Albums | Shortlisted | |

== Track listing ==
| No. | Title | Writer(s) | Producer(s) | Length |
|---|---|---|---|---|
| 1. | "Grace" | Rochelle Jordan; Travis Stewart; Kelvin Montgomery; Rob Araujo; KLSH | KLSH; Machinedrum; Rob Araujo | 0:58 |
| 2. | "Ladida" | Jordan; Montgomery; River Jason Moon | KLSH | 3:43 |
| 3. | "Sum" | Jordan; Byron Blaylock; Montgomery | KLSH; Byron the Aquarius | 4:09 |
| 4. | "The Boy" | Jordan; Louis Kevin Celestin; Chieli Minucci | Kaytranada | 3:34 |
| 5. | "Doing It Too" | Jordan; Blaylock; Masaaki Asada; Montgomery | Initial Talk; KLSH; Byron the Aquarius | 3:26 |
| 6. | "Never Enough" | Jordan; Blaylock; Paris Alexa Williams; Montgomery | KLSH; Byron the Aquarius | 4:00 |
| 7. | "Words 2 Say" | Jordan; Stewart; Laurence Reading; Montgomery | KLSH; Machinedrum | 3:50 |
| 8. | "Bite the Bait" | Jordan; James Edgar | Jimmy Edgar | 4:06 |
| 9. | "On 2 Something" | Jordan; Stewart; Williams; Tavon Thompson | Machinedrum; WaveIQ | 2:23 |
| 10. | "TTW" | Jordan; Blaylock; Williams; Montgomery | KLSH; Byron the Aquarius | 3:57 |
| 11. | "Crave" | Jordan; Terry Hunter; Williams | Terry Hunter | 3:27 |
| 12. | "Get It Off" | Jordan; Williams | KLSH | 4:00 |
| 13. | "Sweet Sensation" | Jordan; Damon Garrett Riddick; Montgomery | KLSH; Dam-Funk | 3:43 |
| 14. | "Eyes Shut" | Jordan; Williams; Philip Gamble; Ezra Maxwell Rubin | Kingdom | 3:09 |
| 15. | "Close 2 Me" | Jordan; Myles Fairbairn | MpH | 4:01 |
| 16. | "I'm Your Muse" | Jordan; Stewart; Williams; Montgomery | KLSH; Machinedrum | 3:35 |
| 17. | "Around" | Jordan; Alexander Hamdi | Hamdi | 3:50 |
| Total length: | | | | 59:58 |
