= Royal (Jesse Royal album) =

Studio album by Jesse Royal
- Released: June 11, 2021
- Genre: Reggae, R&B, Afrobeats
- Length: 39:48
- Label: Easy Star Records
- Producer: Jesse Royal

Jesse Royal chronology
Lily Of Da Valley (2017)	Royal (2021)

Royal is the second full-length album by Jamaican reggae artist Jesse Royal, released on June 11, 2021. Royal received a nomination for Best Reggae Album at the 2022 Grammy Awards. The 11-track album was released with NYC-based Easy Star Records. On his sophomore album, Jesse Royal is accompanied by fellow Jamaican artists Vybz Kartel, Protoje, Runkus, Kumar, and Samory I, as well as Ghanaian musician Stonebwoy and others

== Track listing ==
No.	Title	Length
1.	"High Tide or Low" (featuring Samory I)	3:54
2.	"LionOrder" (featuring Protoje)	3:32
3.	"Dirty Money" (featuring Stonebwoy)	4:13
4.	"Natty Dread"	3:21
5.	"Home"	3:58
6.	"Rich Forever" (featuring Vybz Kartel)	3:48
7.	"Natty Pablo"	3:09
8.	"Black"	3:34
9.	"Like Dat" (featuring Runkus)	2:48
10.	"Differences"	3:29
11.	"Strongest Link (Do My Best)" (featuring Kumar)	4:02
Total length:		39:48
