= Perfect Union =

Studio album by Kool & the Gang
- Released: August 20, 2021
- Genres: Disco; funk
- Length: 36:12
- Label: Omnivore
- Producers: Ronald Bell, with several co-producers on select tracks

Kool & the Gang chronology
| Kool for the Holidays (2012) | Perfect Union (2021) | People Just Wanna Have Fun (2023) |

Perfect Union is a 2021 studio album by American disco and funk band Kool & the Gang. The album was the first new music from the group in over a decade and was last to feature founding member Ronald Bell before his death.

== Reception ==
Editors at AllMusic rated this album 2.5 out of 5 stars, with critic Mark Deming writing that the band's music suffered from the loss of Ronald Bell, but also writing that "the interplay among the musicians is lively".

== Singles ==
"Sexy" peaked at No. 16 on the US Billboard Adult R&B Songs chart in October 2016.

== Track listing ==
| No. | Title | Writer(s) | Length |
|---|---|---|---|
| 1. | "Pursuit of Happiness" | Walter Anderson; Robert "Kool" Bell; Ronald Bell; Celina Gray; Balewa Muhammad; Jahqae Muhammad; Keith Murray; Dennis "Dee Tee" Thomas | 5:13 |
| 2. | "The Weekend" | Anderson; Ronald Bell; B. Muhammad; J. Muhammad | 3:08 |
| 3. | "Leave It on the Dance Floor" | Anderson; Ronald Bell; Gabriele Falanga | 3:18 |
| 4. | "High" | Anderson; Ronald Bell | 4:46 |
| 5. | "Sexy (Where’d You Get Yours)" | Anderson; Ronald Bell; Alessandro Calemme | 2:48 |
| 6. | "All to Myself" | Anderson; Ronald Bell; Calemme | 3:34 |
| 7. | "R.O.Y.A.L.T.Y." (Kool & the Gang mix) | Anderson; Shaun Bass; Hakim Bell; Ronald Bell; Hamza Lee | 3:11 |
| 8. | "Hold On" | Anderson; Robert Bell; Ronald Bell | 3:35 |
| 9. | "Good Time" | Anderson; Bass; H. Bell; Ronald Bell; Akene Dunkley; Saint | 3:21 |
| 10. | "Pursuit of Happiness" (rap version) | Anderson; Robert Bell; Ronald Bell; Gray; B. Muhammad; J. Muhammad; Murray; thomas | 3:18 |
| Total length: | | | 36:12 |

== Personnel ==
Kool & the Gang

- Robert "Kool" Bell – bass guitar, drums, electric guitar, keyboard, tenor saxophone, backing vocals
- Ronald Bell – mixing, production, executive production
- George "Funky" Brown – percussion
- Timothy Horton – drums, percussion
- Shawn McQuiller – vocals
- Michael Ray – trumpet, vocals
- Dennis "Dee Tee" Thomas – alto saxophone

Additional personnel

- Eddie Allen – trumpet
- Greg Allen – project assistance
- Walt Anderson – vocals, vocal arrangement, production on "Sexy (Where'd You Get Yours)"
- Shaun Bass – bass guitar
- Amir Bayyan – electric guitar
- Royal Bayyan – electric guitar
- Hakim Bell – production on "R.O.Y.A.L.T.Y." (Kool & the Gang Mix)
- Ravi Best – trumpet
- Audrey Bilger – project assistance
- Mark Bowers – electric guitar
- Jermaine Bryson – trombone
- Alessandro Calemme – bass guitar, electric guitar, keyboards, organ, production on "All to Myself" and "Sexy (Where'd You Get Yours)"
- Dutch Cramblitt – project assistance
- Akene Dunkley – guitar, keyboards, production on "Good Time"
- Lavell Evans – backing vocals
- Chris Gehringer – mastering
- Joy Graves – project assistance
- Gabri Hell – production on "Leave It On the Dancefloor"
- Steve Lavell – vocals
- Diego Leanza – bass guitar, electric guitar
- Hamza Lee – production on "R.O.Y.A.L.T.Y." (Kool & the Gang Mix)
- Lee Lodyga – project assistance
- Balewa Muhammad – vocals
- Rashad Muhammad – engineering, mixing
- Keith Murray – rapping on "Pursuit of Happiness" (rap version)
- Cheryl Pawelski – project assistance
- Jacqueline Reilly – backing vocals
- Brad Rosenberger – project assistance
- Saint – guitar, keyboards, production
- Mark Smith – production on "Good Time"
- Robert Stringer – trombone
- Kendal Stubbs – engineering, mixing

== Charts ==
Chart performance for Perfect Union
| Chart (2021) | Peak position |
|---|---|
| Swiss Albums (Schweizer Hitparade) | 47 |
