= Julia Nixon =

American rhythm and blues singer (1955–2021)

- Born: Julia Carol McGirt; February 7, 1955; Rowland, North Carolina, U.S.
- Died: September 29, 2021 (aged 66) Raleigh, North Carolina, U.S.
- Genres: R&B
- Occupations: Singer; musician
- Years active: 1984–2021

Julia Carol Nixon (February 7, 1955 – September 29, 2021) was an American rhythm and blues singer.

== Biography ==
Nixon was born Julia Carol McGirt in Rowland, North Carolina, on February 7, 1955. In the mid-1980s, she began leading a musical group called Julia & Company. The band had two singles that charted on the UK Singles Chart. "Breakin' Down (Sugar Samba)" reached #15 in March 1984, while "I'm So Happy" reached #56 in February 1985.

Her first solo album was released in 2007. At the 2009 Wammies, she won the Urban Contemporary Vocalist Award and her ensemble, Julia & Company, won the Urban Contemporary Duo/Group Award.

Nixon died from complications related to COVID-19 in Raleigh on September 29, 2021, during the COVID-19 pandemic in North Carolina. She was 66 years old.

== Discography ==
=== Studio album ===
- Keepin' On Track (2007)

=== Singles as Julia & Company ===
Year	Song	^{UK Chart}
1984	"Breakin' Down (Sugar Samba)"	15
1985	"I'm So Happy"	56
