= WJ De King =

South Sudanese Reggae musician

WJ De King (born Wonlok James, 12 April 1987) is a Reggae Musician from South Sudan.

== Biography ==
WJ De King was born in the village of Parajok-Magwi County in the Eastern Equatoria State, South Sudan. WJ is from Eastern Equatoria State and has a father called Augustine which by tribe is a group of the Nilotes that once moved into South Sudan for settlement. He is pertaining to the hometown of Torit in South Sudan. He was separated from his parents in the terror of the gunfire due to the South Sudan Civil War of 2005. He professionally started his music career in 2005.

== Personal life ==
Besides being a musician, WJ is a Peace and Children`s right activist. He is the leader of the Lokwilili Kingdom a name that signifies the band in which he operates and does his music.

He equally serves as the International ambassador for Save the Children International South Sudan Office.

In the later times Save the Children, just made WJ their Goodwill ambassador.

Wj De King has a wife and has received a child whom they have built the family together with in the past years of his music and personal achievements.

2020 Wj De king survived car accident he and singer Dollar Bil

== Music career ==
His profession in music started in 2005 in the music group freedom boys.

W J De King who is the leader and head of the Lokwilili kingdom uses his music and influence to spearhead messages that encourage the rights for girls to go to school and make choices in life.

== Music albums ==
As of 2016 WJ De King launched numerous of his albums which included among others Gebiliya, Hizu hizu, Akir to fi, Zaman towil, Ana bi ruwa weni, Lotole Master, Macho Yako, Sibili, Jou Geru, Peace, Season of Peace, Bamba Dak.

He has worked with Ugandan and Tanzanian musicians all in a bid to promote peace and spread the gospel of unity across the world not only in his home country.

Names: Wonklok James Stage name: WJ De King Date of Birth: 12-April-1987 Place of Birth: Torit Nationality: South Sudanese
