= Red Top Young =

American singer-songwriter (1936–2021)

Robert "Red Top" Young
- Also known as: Red Top
- Born: Robert Lee Young; February 15, 1936
- Origin: Martinsville, Virginia
- Died: May 26, 2021
- Genres: Blues; Rhythm and Blues; Rock n Roll; Country; Jazz
- Occupation: Musician
- Instruments: Keyboards, Piano
- Years active: 1950s–2021
- Labels: Mercury, Lanso
- Website: www.RedTopYoung.com

Red Top Young (born Robert Lee Young; February 15, 1936 – May 26, 2021) was an American blues, rhythm and blues, country, rock and roll and jazz musician.

Robert Lee Young was born February 15, 1936, in Martinsville, Virginia, to Willie and Mattie Young. One of seven children, he started his education in Martinsville and completed high school in Elyria, Ohio. Subsequently, he attended Cleveland Music School in Cleveland, Ohio. All of his brothers had a love for music and the talent to go with it. He started making music at the age of eight and never stopped during his life.

After learning to play on a "1000 pound" upright piano that one of his brothers purchased, he knew that music was what he wanted to do. His first professional job was in Martinsville when one night Fats Domino was too sick to perform for an annual event, the June German Ball, and Robert was asked to play piano, along with his brother Muncie.

At the age of 15, he and his brother Muncie joined his brother Nick in Elyria, Ohio. His parents later relocated to Elyria and the family was all together again. Music was the brothers' mistress and soon they had formed a group called The Four Lovers, consisting of Robert, his brother Muncie, and friends Paul Kimble and John Cristman. The group's management and bookings were handled by Sonny Rucker and Libby Hodge. After that group broke up another was started called 4 Young Lovers, consisting of himself, his brothers Muncie, Jessie, and John Alver. By this time, Robert had started to be known as Red Top. The group played in and around Lorain and Cuyahoga County, at venues like The Majestic Hotel in downtown Cleveland for two years in the early 1950s.

Prior to enlisting in the U.S. Army in 1954, he met and married Carol Edwards and played with the great Lloyd Price. After basic training at Fort Knox Kentucky, he was sent as a reconnaissance engineer to Korea for 16 months and 4 days, where he encountered Lloyd Price and his group and had the opportunity to perform with them in 1955. His brother Muncie also enlisted in the U.S. Marine Corps. After their discharge from the armed services in 1956, with a contract to play with Lloyd Price, his first job was at The Armory in Lorain in 1957. He still maintained his strong connection to Virginia and traveled throughout the south performing with some of the greats in the business like Little Richard, and Bobby Eckstein (cousin of famed Billy Eckstine), but always coming back to Lorain County to play at a club called Minerva’s again and again.

Being away from his bride for so long, he decided not to go on the road and joined a group called Lee Able & The Red Ryders. Red Top, Lee Able, Sam Doman, and Vonlee Adams, performed for 22 years.

Robert went out on his own in the late 1960s. His group was called Red Top and the Young family, they did blues, rhythm and blues, country, rock and roll, and jazz. The girl singers in the group were called the Toppetts: Sugar Young (niece), Beverly Wright, and her sister Norma. They traveled throughout the U.S. in a 1950 Black Buick Ambulance and a 1958 Cadillac Hearse. After the loss of most of the group's members, he recruited new members: Laddie Fair, Sr., Lorenzo Casey, Vernon Wallace, and Diego Tony Johnson, who continued to perform throughout the U.S. for the next four years. During that time he met and married his second wife Janice in 1978, continued to record with Lanzo Records and moved to San Destine, Florida, with his wife and young son, continuing to perform with his group and with Jo Jo Benson and Johnny Taylor, B.B. King, Pinetop and Ray Charles in France along with many other blues groups throughout Europe.

Over the next 10 years while playing with Robert Lockwood, Jr.'s band he traveled all over the world, playing with Lockwood until the latter's death in November 2006, and in that same year, he also worked with Buddy Miles.

Young has worked with Quincy Jones, Jerry Lee Lewis, Frankie Avalon, Bill Haley and the Comets, The Coasters, Fabian, Paul Anka, The Platters and Dionne Warwick.
