= Rochelle Jordan =

Jamaican-British singer

- Born: 21 October 1986 (age 40); High Wycombe, Buckinghamshire, England
- Genres: Alternative R&B; dance-pop; house
- Occupations: Singer; songwriter
- Years active: 2011–present
- Labels: Empire; Young Art; Protostar
- Website: www.rochellejordan.com

Rochelle Jordan is a British-Jamaican singer raised primarily in Toronto, Canada. Her music is known for its blend of alternative R&B, dance-pop, and house.

== Early life ==
She was born in High Wycombe, Buckinghamshire, England on 21 October 1986, and moved to Wheatley, Canada at age 4 with her family. Her parents were British Jamaican and her father was a musician. She was diagnosed with sickle cell anemia at age 2 and was frequently hospitalized for the disorder. She began making music when she was 16, uploading covers of R&B songs on YouTube after being inspired by Justin Bieber.

== Career ==
Record producer KLSH discovered Jordan through her YouTube videos in 2009. The two collaborated on Jordan's first mixtape, Alien Phase, released in 2010. This was followed by her 2011 mixtape Rojo and 2012 mixtape Pressure. Jordan released her debut album, 1021, in 2014. She wrote and recorded the project in her bedroom after she moved to Los Angeles for her musical career. Following the release of the album, she signed a record deal that she described as "toxic" and fell into a "really intense depression" while continuing to deal with sickle cell anemia. In the final year of the deal, she signed to Young Art, a label imprint run by record producer Tokimonsta.

Following a seven year hiatus, Jordan released her second album, Play with the Changes in April 2021. She released her third album, Through the Wall in September 2025.

Through the Wall was shortlisted for the 2026 Polaris Music Prize, and the song "The Boy" was longlisted for the SOCAN Polaris Song Prize.

== Discography ==
=== Albums ===
- 1021 (2014)
- Play with the Changes (2021)
- Through the Wall (2025)

=== Mixtapes ===
- Alien Phase (2010)
- Rojo (2011)
- Origins (2011)
- Pressure (2012)
