= Rakiyah =

American R&B singer-songwriter and producer (born 1992)

Rakiyah Nadia Wright (born November 27, 1992), known professionally as Rakiyah, is an American R&B singer-songwriter and producer. In 2020 she released the Korean-English song “Like You” and in 2021 her R&B EP, Into the Cosmos.

== Early life ==
Rakiyah Nadia Wright was born on November 27, 1992, in Montclair, New Jersey, and is of African-American descent. She spent her early childhood years living in Vance, South Carolina and later, moved with her family to East Orange, New Jersey. She attended the New Jersey Institute of Technology in Newark, New Jersey, where she studied as an Industrial Engineer Undergraduate. During her early post-secondary studies, Rakiyah developed an interest in the Korean language after a coworker introduced her to Boys Over Flowers, a popular Korean drama.

In 2016, Rakiyah created the YouTube channel Rakiyah In Space, sharing Korean study tips. Soon after the creation of her channel, Rakiyah received multiple scholarships in February 2017 to study abroad as an exchange student for an academic semester at Hanyang University, in Seoul, South Korea. She attended Hanyang University for a second time from September 2018 to June 2019, but decided to pursue a career in music instead.

== Musical career ==
Rakiyah released her first EP, Alter Eg, in 2018 under the stage name Rakiyah Nadia. In the following year, Rakiyah recorded her second EP, Mango Tree, and third EP, HIM, while studying in South Korea, and changed her stage name to the mononym Rakiyah.

Rakiyah released her first English/Korean R&B single, "Like You", on October 23, 2020. She released an EP, Into The Cosmos, on January 5, 2021.

Rakiyah is also a songwriter.

== Discography ==
=== EPs ===
- Alter Ego (2018)
- Mango Tree (2019)
- Him (2019)
- Into The Cosmos (2021)
- Ready or Not (2024)
- The Cosmic Queen (TBD)
