= Raissa (Malaysian-British singer) =

British singer-songwriter

- Also known as: Raissa Artista
- Born: 29 April 1997 (age 29); Zaragoza, Spain
- Genres: Pop; R&B; Indie
- Occupations: Singer-songwriter; Music video director
- Years active: 2019–present
- Label: Independent

Raissa (born 1997 in Zaragoza (Spain)) is a Spanish-British singer-songwriter raised in Kuala Lumpur Malaysia. She became publicly known for her debut single "Bullying Boys", followed by "Valentine" and "Angel Energy" and for a collaboration with the producer Mark Ronson, “I Want to See the Bright Lights Tonight”.

She was one of American blog Ones to Watch's picks for 2020, described as "the DIY artist with dreams of doing it all". She was signed to Zelig Records, an imprint of American label Columbia Records owned by Mark Ronson.

== Discography ==
=== EPs ===
- Herogirl (2021)

=== Singles ===
==== As lead artist ====
- "Bullying Boys" (2020)
- "Valentine" (2020)
- "Angel Energy" (2020)
- "Go Fast Baby" (2020)
- "Crowded" (2020)
- "Shades On" (2021)

==== As featured artist ====
- "I Want To See The Bright Lights Tonight" [by Mark Ronson] (2020)

=== Music videos ===
==== As lead artist ====
- "Bullying Boys" (2020) – directed by Raissa
- "Valentine" (2020) – directed by Raissa
- "Angel Energy" (2020) – directed by Raissa
- "Go Fast Baby" (2020) – directed by bedroom
- "Crowded" (2020) – directed by Florence Kosky

==== As featured artist ====
- "I Want To See The Bright Lights Tonight" [by Mark Ronson] (2020) – directed by Jamie-James Medina

== Influences ==
Raissa has named Lady Gaga, Prince, David Bowie, Leonard Cohen and Joni Mitchell as some of her main musical inspirations. She praised Gaga's presence as a female artist, Prince and Bowie's theatricality and Cohen and Mitchell's lyricism.

== Philanthropy ==
Raissa was one of the artists to sign a letter addressing the British government and requesting an "effective ban on conversion therapy", along with other stars such as Dua Lipa, Charli XCX, Elton John, Little Mix's Jade Thirlwall and Rina Sawayama.
