= Protoje =

Jamaican musician (born 1981)

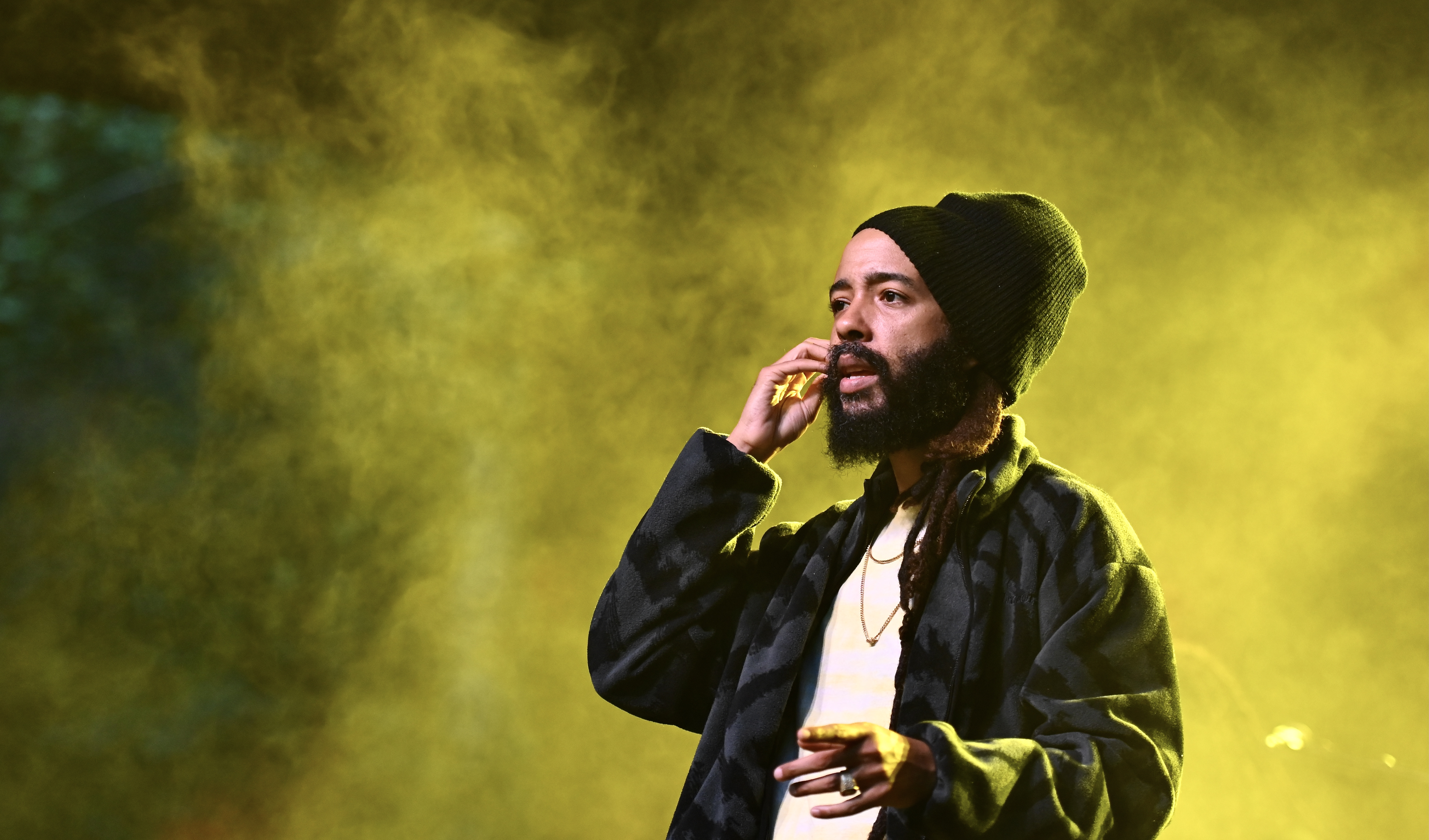
- Protoje in concert in Antwerp, Belgium, 2022

Background information
- Also known as: Diggy, Proto
- Born: Oje Ken Ollivierre; 14 June 1981 (age 45)
- Origin: Saint Elizabeth, Jamaica
- Genres: Dub, reggae
- Occupations: Musician, singer, songwriter, deejay
- Years active: 2005–present
- Labels: In.Digg.Nation; Overstand Entertainment; Don Corleon Records; Easy Star; RCA
- Website: protoje.com

Oje Ken Ollivierre (born 14 June 1981), popularly known as Protoje, is a contemporary Jamaican reggae singer and songwriter. Protoje first gained notice for a 2005 mixtape. In 2011, he released his debut album The Seven Year Itch. This was followed by The 8 Year Affair in 2013, Ancient Future in 2015, Royalty Free in 2016, A Matter of Time in 2018, In Search of Lost Time in 2020, Third Time's the Charm in 2022 and The Art of Acceptance in 2026.

His albums In Search of Lost Time and Third Time's the Charm both reached the top 10 on the Billboard Reggae Albums chart. Proteje received Grammy nominations for the albums A Matter of Time and Third Time's the Charm.

== Early life ==
He was born in Saint Elizabeth, Jamaica. His mother is Jamaican singer and lawyer Lorna Bennett, best known for her 1972 rendition of "Breakfast in Bed". His father is a former calypso singer, Mike Ollivierre, from Saint Vincent and the Grenadines.

== Career ==
Protoje first gained notice for his 2005 mixtape Lyrical Overdose Volume 1, featuring mostly hip hop-influenced songs. With a guest appearance by Busy Signal, however, his future career was leveled as a reggae and dancehall artist.

=== Seven Year Itch ===
In 2010, Protoje began working with Don Corleon Records, run by his cousin and Jamaican producer Don Corleon. After releasing "Dread", "JA" and "Roll" in 2010, Protoje's debut album, entitled The Seven Year Itch, was released on 25 January 2011. The first single off the album, dubbed "Arguments" (2009), was responsible for his early popularity in Jamaica. In 2011, he released another single off the album entitled "Rasta Love", featuring Ky-Mani Marley.

=== 8 Year Affair ===
His second album, The 8 Year Affair, was released 12 February 2013. "Who Dem a Program" was the first single released from the album in January 2012, with "This Is Not a Marijuana Song" following mid-year. "Kingston Be Wise" was heavily promoted via traditional and social media. On the day of its release, 5 November 2012, the music video became the most viewed YouTube link among internet users in Jamaica. The hashtag #KBW was used on Twitter. The song "Kingston Be Wise" (a remake of Ini Kamoze's song "England Be Nice") was featured in the video game Grand Theft Auto V on the in-game "Blue Ark" radio station, increasing its popularity further and making an international name for the reggae artist. Protoje cited reggae artist Ini Kamoze and the group Black Uhuru as influences when recording the album.

In December 2014, Protoje was included on BBC Radio 1Xtra's 'Hot for 2015' list.

=== Ancient Future ===
His third album Ancient Future was initially set for release in September 2014, but was put back until March 2015. Produced by Phillip "Winta" James, the album includes the song "Who Knows", a collaboration with Chronixx, which was released as a single. Two tracks from the album, "Answer to Your Name" and "Criminal" were released ahead of the album as exclusives on the England Be Wise mixtape for BBC 1xtra DJ Toddla T. Two weeks after its release, it topped the Billboard Top Reggae Albums chart. "Who Knows" was certified silver by the BPI in 2022.

=== Recent career ===
On 14 June 2016, Protoje released Side B of his fourth studio album, Royalty Free, as a free download to the public on his website. His 2018 album, A Matter of Time, received a Grammy Award nomination in the Best Reggae Album category. On 27 March 2020, Protoje joined Chronixx on a remix of Alicia Keys' song "Underdog". On 13 April 2020, Protoje announced a new label deal with RCA Records.

The deal allowed him "a certain level of creative control" and included artists Lila Iké and Sevana who he had been mentoring under his own In.Digg.Nation label.

On 28 August 2020, Protoje released his fifth studio album In Search of Lost Time, which peaked at No. 6 on the Billboard Reggae Albums chart.

On 23 September 2022, Protoje released his sixth studio album Third Time's the Charm, which peaked at No. 8 on the Billboard Reggae Albums chart and secured him a Grammy nomination.

== Discography ==
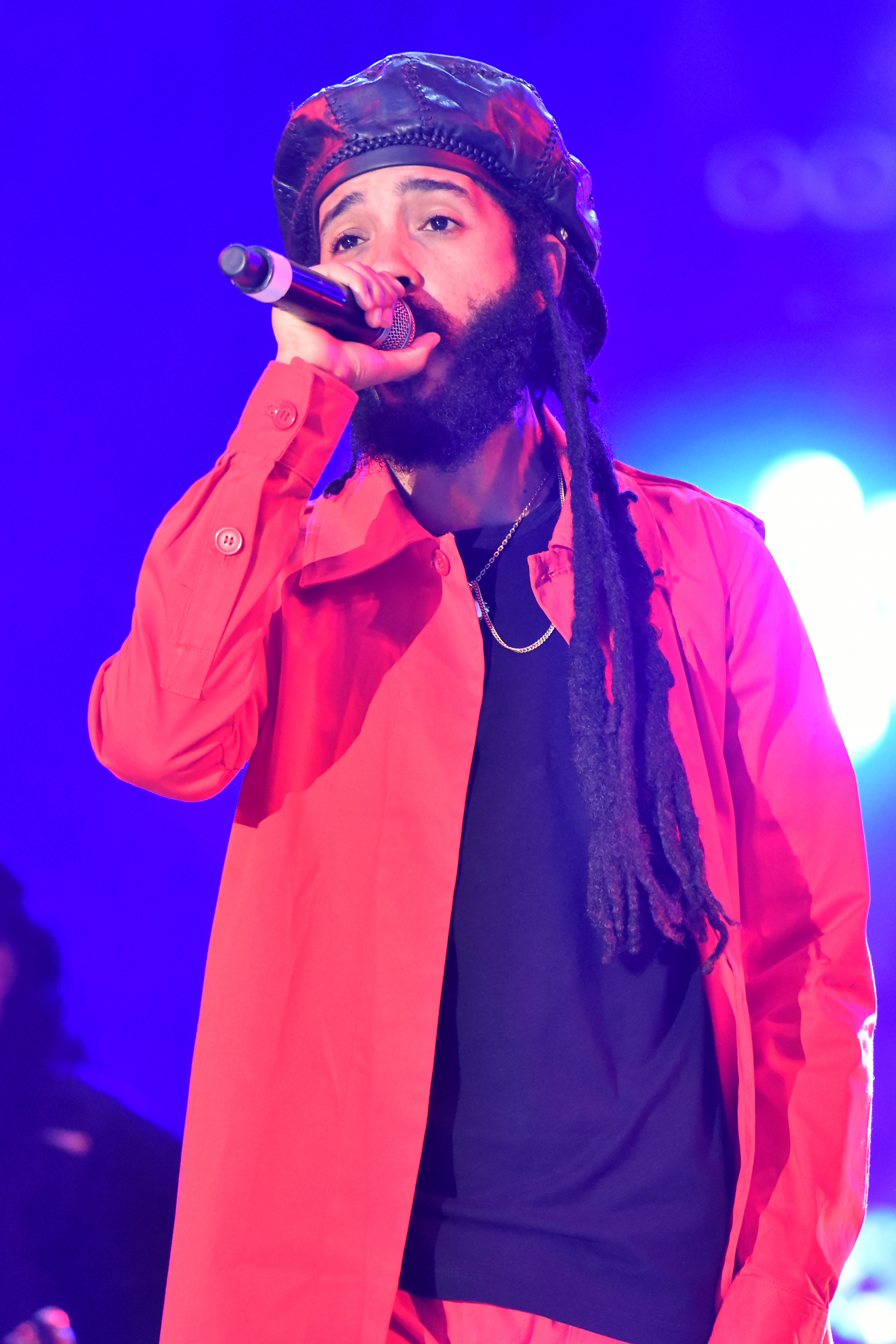
Protoje at Ruhr Reggae Summer 2017

=== Albums ===
- 2011: Seven Year Itch
- 2013: The 8 Year Affair
- 2015: Ancient Future
- 2016: Royalty Free (Side B)
- 2018: A Matter of Time
- 2020: In Search of Lost Time (deluxe version released in 2021)
- 2022: Third Time's the Charm
- 2023: In Search of Zion
- 2024: The Jamaican Situation (A Soundtrack, Side A)
- 2026: The Art of Acceptance

=== Mixtapes ===
- 2011: This Is Protoje
- 2013: Music from My Heart
- 2015: Kingston Be Wise (Toddla T Meets Protoje)

=== Singles ===
- 2009: "Arguments"
- 2010: "Dread"
- 2010: "JA"
- 2010: "Roll"
- 2011: "Rasta Love" (featuring "Ky-Mani Marley")
- 2012: "Who Dem a Program"
- 2012: "This Is Not a Marijuana Song"
- 2012: "Kingston Be Wise"
- 2013: "I&I"
- 2013: "Resist Not Evil (Militancy Riddim)" (Overstand Entertainment)
- 2014: "Who Knows" (featuring Chronixx)
- 2014: "Stylin'"
- 2015: "Answer to Your Name"
- 2015: "Bubblin'"
- 2015: "Sudden Flight" (featuring Jesse Royal and Sevana)
- 2017: "Blood Money"
- 2018: "Bout Noon"
- 2018: "Criminal"'
- 2020: "Switch It Up"
- 2021: "Still Blooming" (featuring Lila Iké and Izy Beats)
- 2022: "Hills"
- 2022: "Family" (featuring Jesse Royal)
