= Gemini (Project Moonman album) =

Studio album by Project Moonman
- Released: June 4, 2021
- Genre: Alternative rock; R&B; electronic; pop
- Length: 51:18
- Label: O/C Records
- Producer: Mark Thompson

Gemini is the debut studio album by experimental Filipino rock band Project Moonman. The album consists of thirteen original tracks. It was released in 2021 by O/C Records.

== Background ==
Project Moonman started out as a solo project by DJ and songwriter Mark Thompson, and then he met the other members and started forming a band.

The band then announced that they will be releasing an album because "They can" and "They wanted to."

== Track listing ==
13 songs were written by Mark Thompson and Owen Greyson.

Gemini
No.	Title	Writer(s)	Producer(s)	Length
1.	"Moonman"	M. Thompson; O. Greyson	M. Thompson	2:17
2.	"Streetlights / Nightshift" (Re-Imagined)	M. Thompson	M. Thompson	6:39
3.	"Cycle" (Re-Imagined)	M. Thompson	M. Thompson	4:23
4.	"Fuck You" (Re-Imagined)	M. Thompson	M. Thompson	4:00
5.	"IGABF" (I Got a Bad Feeling)	M. Thompson; O. Greyson	M. Thompson	4:02
6.	"YCPM / Lost" (Re-Imagined)	M. Thompson	M. Thompson	5:23
7.	"The Great Alone" (Re-Imagined)	M. Thompson	M. Thompson	4:09
8.	"I Care" (Remastered)	M. Thompson	M. Thompson	4:20
9.	"Finding a Way" (Album Cut)	M. Thompson	M. Thompson	2:44
10.	"Sunny Day"	O. Greyson	M. Thompson	4:23
11.	"Feel Your Love"	M. Thompson	M. Thompson	4:31
12.	"Healing"	M. Thompson; O. Greyson	M. Thompson	4:32
13.	"Feel"	M. Thompson; O. Greyson	M. Thompson	3:22
Total length:				51:18

== Personnel ==
- Mark Thompson – producer, songwriter, vocalist
- Owen Greyson – songwriter, vocalist
- Nick Gotinga – lead guitarist
- Alden Acosta – bass guitarist
- Lukas Samuel – drums
- Arden Formento – dj
