= Project Moonman =

Filipino rock band

- Origin: Manila, Philippines
- Genres: Alternative rock; Rhythm and blues; Electronic; Pop
- Years active: 2020–present
- Label: O/C Records
- Members: Mark Thompson; Owen Greyson; Nick Gotinga; Alden Acosta; Lukas Samuel; Arden Formento
- Website: projectmoonman.com

Project Moonman is an experimental Filipino rock band formed in Manila, Philippines, in 2020 during the COVID-19 pandemic. The band is composed of producer, songwriter and vocalist Mark Thompson, songwriter and vocalist Owen Greyson, lead guitarist Nick Gotinga, bass guitarist Alden Acosta, and drummer Lukas Samuel. Later in 2021, they added DJ Arden Formento in the band. The band is signed with O/C Records, releasing their debut studio album Gemini in 2021

The sound of Project Moonman is defined as a mix of raw vocals, personal expression, cinematic textures, live instrumentals and electronic music.

== History ==
=== Early years ===
Mark Thompson had songs for a band he wants to form, he got signed to O/C Records and had to find band members. Coming from the DJ scene, he wanted to create something different, to perform with musicians instead of doing it alone.

He met Nick Gotinga (lead guitarist) and Alden Acosta (bass guitarist) through Kean Cipriano during a recording session at O/C Records. That same day Mark met Martin Riggs Nuñez. They were there to just hang out and talk about the plans for Project Moonman.

Alden & Mark hit it off because they were talking about the technical side of mixing and mastering. Whereas Nick played every riff on the first listen in the O/C Records recording studio which blew Mark's mind.

Owen Greyson & Mark have been working together already, Mark has been producing some of Owen's songs. And got him on board to fill the backing vocals for our live. Eventually he also wrote some verses and joined the group.

Lukas Samuel (drums) and Mark met through Nick. Nick and Lukas were former band Mates. They needed a drummer for their first round of live performances (online). Lukas fits the role perfectly.

Arden Formento (DJ) came in late, he's been in Battle Circuit DJing. Mark relates to that, because it's the same route he went through. Arden's role is to fill all the electronic sounds and vocal samples in the original songs and provide space.

=== Debut album: Gemini ===
The band released their debut album in June 2021 being titled Gemini.

== Band members ==
- Mark Thompson – producer, songwriter, vocalist
- Owen Greyson – songwriter, vocalist
- Nick Gotinga – lead guitarist
- Alden Acosta – bass guitarist
- Lukas Samuel – drums
- Arden Formento – dj

== Discography ==
=== Studio albums ===
- Gemini (2021)

=== Singles ===
Title	Release date
"The Great Alone"	May 15, 2020
"I Care"	May 29, 2020
"Finding A Way"	June 12, 2020
"Streetlights [Explicit]"	June 26, 2020
"Streetlights [Clean]"	July 10, 2020
"Fuck You"	July 31, 2020
"Love You"	August 7, 2020
"Lost"	August 21, 2020
"Cycle"	September 4, 2020
"YCPM [Explicit]"	Septempter 18, 2020
"YCPM [Clean]"	October 2, 2020
"Night Shift"	November 17, 2020

==== As a featured artist ====
Title	Release date
"By The Skin Of Your Teeth" (Patty Tiu featuring Project Moonman)	December 21, 2020
