= Play with the Changes (Rochelle Jordan album) =

Studio album by Rochelle Jordan
- Released: April 30, 2021
- Genre: Alternative dance; alternative R&B; UK garage
- Length: 46:23
- Label: Young Art Records
- Producer: Alix Perez; Jimmy Edgar; KLSH; Machinedrum; Sepalcure

Rochelle Jordan chronology
1021 (2014)	Play with the Changes (2021)	Through the Wall (2025)

Singles from Play with the Changes
- 1. "Got Em" Released: January 13, 2021; 2. "All Along" Released: February 12, 2021; 3. "Next 2 You" Released: March 10, 2021; 4. "Something" Released: April 9, 2021

Play with the Changes is the second studio album by British-Canadian singer Rochelle Jordan. It was released on April 30, 2021, via Young Art Records, being the singer's first release in over six years, since her debut in 2014, 1021.

== Background and composition ==
After the release of her critically praised 2014 debut 1021, Rochelle Jordan signed a label and management deal with "quite a known name industry," which she described as "toxic." Feeling of constraint due to a lack of creative freedom and an ongoing battle with a moderate form of sickle cell disease led to cycles of depression. She took a near seven-year hiatus from releasing music, during which she parted ways with her former label and started to "work in her own timeframe." In 2020, she signed with Los Angeles-based producer and DJ Tokimonsta's label, Young Art Records, signaling a new release.

For Play with the Changes, Jordan drew inspiration from underground dance music, including UK garage, drum and bass, house, and jungle. Born in London to Jamaican parents and raised in Toronto, she wanted to express her multi-cultural roots in her music, and cited the variety of music she and her older brother listened to as children as a starting point, stating:

I have a brother who is autistic - he’s ten years older than me - and he bought so many tapes from England of house, deep house, drum’n’bass, jungle, all these crazy records. He would play them over and over because of his obsessive compulsiveness and this is what I was hearing my whole life. And up until this point I don’t think I’ve ever really expressed that side of myself, that muso side of myself that’s very prominent to me.

— Rochelle Jordan to The Line of Best Fit in 2021

Amerie, Aaliyah, Whitney Houston, Mariah Carey, Latrelle, Natasha Ramos, and Vanessa Marquez were influences for Jordan's vocal performances on the album. Additionally, she has named Solange and The Weeknd as inspirations for their experimentation within the R&B genre.

The album's lyricism draws from Jordan's personal experiences and anxieties that arose during her hiatus, touching on themes of depression, longing, racism and police brutality. Katherine St. Asaph of Pitchfork described the album as being steeped in "a near-claustrophobic melancholy." Production was primarily handled by her longtime collaborator KLSH, who also produced her debut, while the mixing and Co Production was handled by electronic musician Travis Stewart, better known as Machinedrum. Additional producers include Jimmy Edgar, Alix Perez and music duo Sepalcure.

== Release and promotion ==
Play with the Changes was originally slated for release in 2020, but was postponed due to the COVID-19 pandemic. It was preceded by four singles released from January to April 2021: "Got Em," "All Along," "Next 2 You," and "Something." The album was eventually released on April 30, 2021.

== Reception ==
Professional ratings
Aggregate scores
Source	Rating
Metacritic	86/100
Review scores
Source	Rating
AllMusic	4.5/5 stars
Exclaim!	8/10
Pitchfork	7.0/10
PopMatters	9/10

According to the review aggregator Metacritic, Play with the Changes received "universal acclaim" based on a weighted average score of 86 out of 100 from 5 critic scores. Critics singled out Jordan's vocal performance and sonic experimentation for praise.

Peter Piatkowski of PopMatters called the album a "masterpiece of club beats, deep hooks, and sweet vocals." Calum Slingerland of Exclaim! concurred, praising Jordan and her collaborators for "[pushing] her artistry into even bolder, more adventurous territory." Slingerland also highlighted the album's blend of upbeat production and vulnerable lyricism. While Asaph stated that the album traverses "very well-trod territory," she commended the album's cohesiveness, writing, "What’s remarkable is how Jordan maintains the vibe even as she whirls through genres." She identified the track "Dancing Elephants" as a particular high point.

Exclaim!, Clash, and PopMatters included Play with the Changes in their respective end-of-year lists, with the lattermost placing it at number ten. The album was also long listed for the 2021 Polaris Music Prize, but was not included in the final list of nominations.

== Track listing ==
All tracks written by Rochelle Jordan except where noted.

Play with the Changes track listing
No.	Title	Writer(s)	Producer(s)	Length
1.	"Love You Good"		Alix Perez; Machinedrum	3:53
2.	"Got Em"		KLSH	3:46
3.	"Next 2 You"		KLSH	3:00
4.	"All Along"	Rochelle Jordan; Kelvin Montgomery	KLSH; Machinedrum^{[a]}	3:23
5.	"Broken Steel" (with Farrah Fawx)	Jordan; Audra Green; Montgomery	KLSH; Machinedrum^{[a]}	4:24
6.	"Count It"		Jimmy Edgar	3:28
7.	"Already"		KLSH; Machinedrum^{[a]}	3:57
8.	"Nothing Left"		Edgar	3:31
9.	"Lay"		KLSH	3:31
10.	"Something"		Machinedrum	3:59
11.	"Dancing Elephants"	Jordan; Montgomery	KLSH; Machinedrum^{[a]}	5:18
12.	"Situation"		Sepalcure	4:13
Total length:				46:23

Notes

- ^{^[a]} signifies a co-producer.

== Personnel ==
- Rochelle Jordan — vocals
- Farrah Fawx — vocals (track 5)
- Jimmy Edgar — mixing (6, 8)
- Chris Godbey — mixing (2, 10)
- Jason Goldberg — mixing (9)
- Travis Stewart — mixing (1–5, 7, 8–12)
- Shawn Hatfield — mastering (1–5, 7, 8–12)
- Naweed — mastering (6, 8)
