= Jesse Royal (musician) =

Jamaican reggae musician

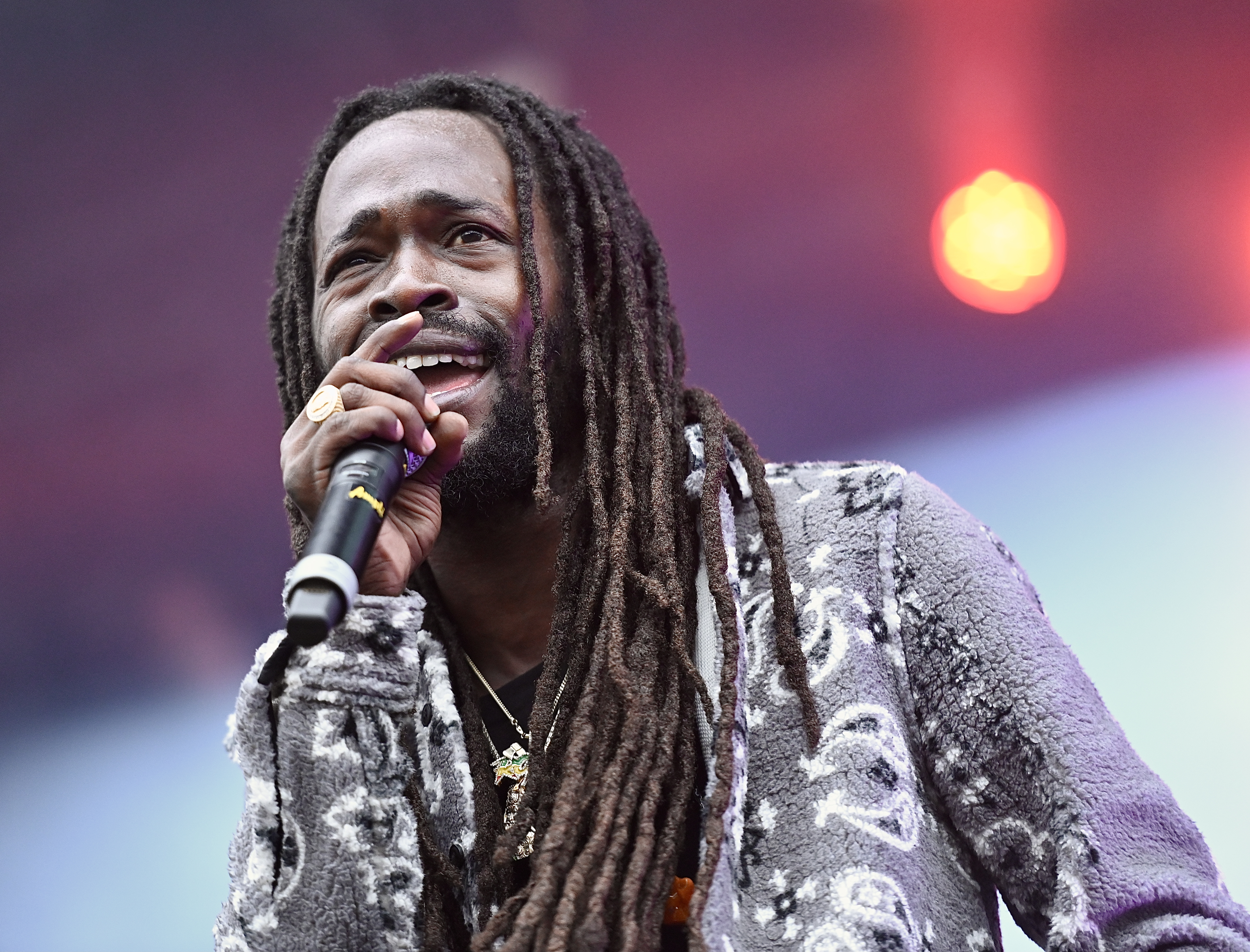
- Jesse Royal at Reggae Geel, Belgium, 2023.

Background information
- Born: Jesse David Leroi Grey; 29 April 1989 (age 36)
- Origin: Maroon Town, St James Parish, Jamaica
- Genres: Reggae, dub, roots reggae
- Occupations: Musician, singer, songwriter
- Instrument: Vocals
- Years active: 2011–present
- Label: Easy Star

Jesse Royal (born 29 April 1989) is a Jamaican reggae musician.

== Early life ==
Jesse David Leroi Grey was born in St James Parish, Jamaica to a family of Maroon ancestry and Rasta faith. The Royal family relocated to Kingston in 1997 where his father took a job with a telecommunications firm. While in school Royal became friends with Daniel Bambata Marley, son of reggae artist Ziggy Marley.

== Music career ==
=== Early life (2010–2016) ===
Royal began his career being mentored by the late Fatis Burrell (the father of one of Royal's classmates), who produced Jesse's first two releases, Singing the Blues and Long Days and Short Nights in 2010. Royal toured extensively in Jamaica, Europe and the United States, before releasing his first major work, Modern Day Judas, a single off of his mixtape, which was a runaway success.

In 2015, Vogue Magazine listed Royal as part of a greater on-going "Reggae Revival" movement (along with other reggae artists Chronixx, Jah9 and Protoje) happening in Jamaica and the rest of the world, revitalizing the genre of roots reggae.

In 2016, Royal was featured on the Raging Fyah album, Everlasting in a song titled "Humble".

=== Lilly of da Valley (2017) ===
After seven years of the release of his first single, Royal recorded his debut album, Lily of da Valley, released by Easy Star Records on October 6, 2017. The album topped the Billboard Reggae Albums chart. The album title draws reference back to an old church hymn written in the late 1800s. Royal explains that the song, which he learned from his grandmother's time in church choir, has been a "source of comfort and reflection for the artist through hard times and serves as a personal reminder that Christ came as an example, not as a deity", encouraging a deeper overstanding of the concept of Christ beyond just the idolized 'picture on the wall' to which He so often gets reduced".

Recordings for Lily of Da Valley took place in many studios like Applehead Studio in Woodstock, New York, the legendary Tuff Gong and Big Yard Studios in Kingston, Jamaica. It was mainly produced by Llamar "Riff Raff" Brown.

The album features recent singles "Always Be Around" and Jo Mersa Marley on the single "Generation", as well as two previously released singles; the Winta James-produced debut song "Modern Day Judas" on the Rootsman Riddim and the Marijuana anthem "Finally".

=== Royal (2021) ===
On June 11, 2021, Jesse Royal released his second studio album titled Royal on Easy Star Records. The LP features collaborations with top reggae artists: Vybz Kartel, Protoje, Kumar, Ghanaian afrobeats artist Stonebwoy, Jamaica's rising talents Samory I, and Runkus.

Jesse Royal was nominated for his first Grammy Award for his album Royal. The album was produced by Grammy-winning reggae producer Sean Alaric who produced most of the album, along with Royal himself, Natural High, Dretegs, Iotosh, Yared "Boomdraw" Lee, Romario "Runkus" Bennett, and Wayne "Unga Barunga" Thompson.

In December 2021, Jesse Royal was nominated for the fans-choice "2021 Album of the Year" award by Surf Roots TV & Radio for his album Royal. Voting was determined by Facebook, Instagram and Twitter users. This was his first time being nominated with the reggae rock streaming TV channel on Amazon Fire TV, Apple TV, and Roku.

== Discography ==
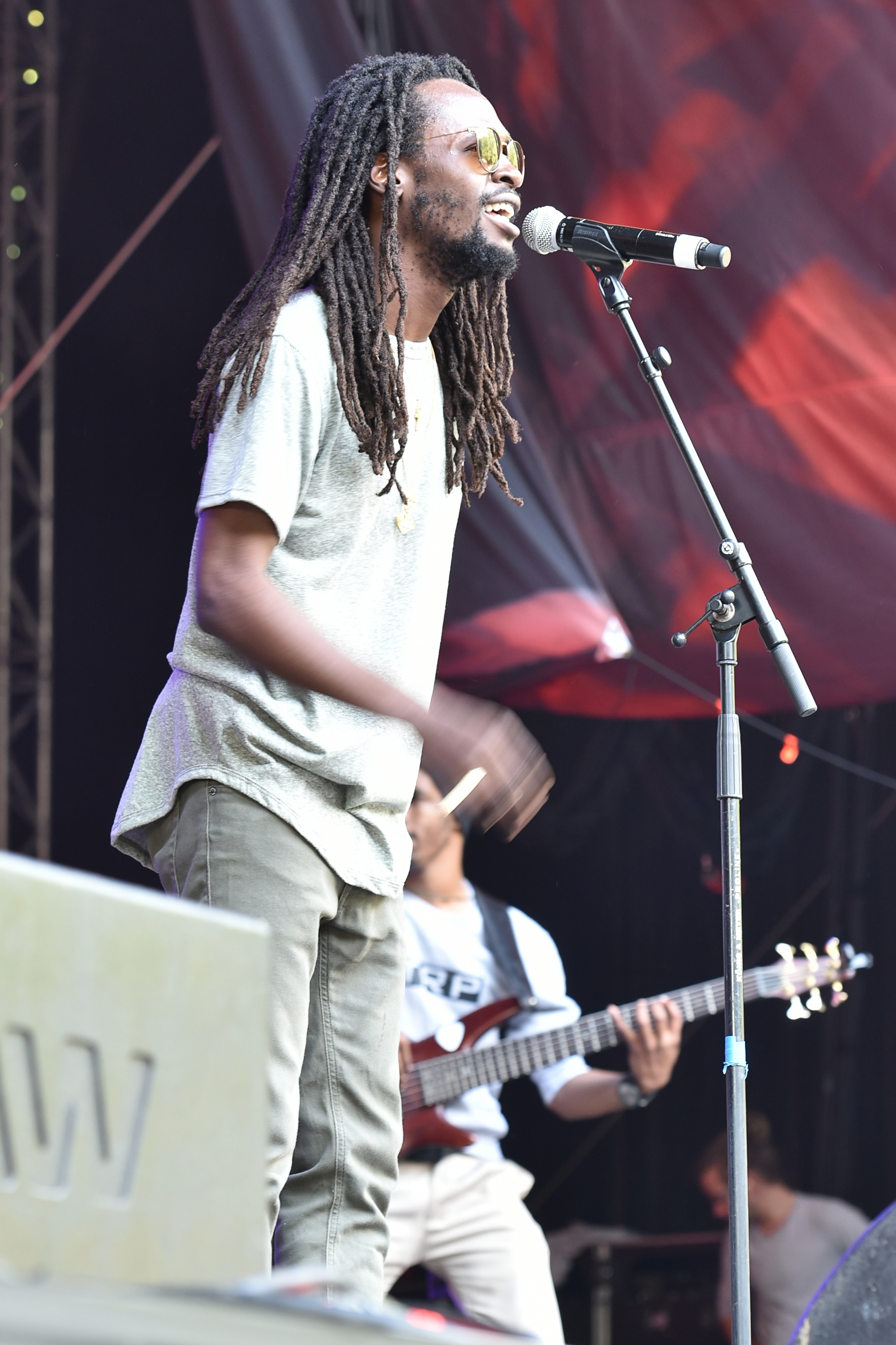
Jesse Royal, 2017

=== Mixtapes ===
- Misheni – DJ Tall Up (2012), Jamaica
- In Comes the Small Axe – DJ Tall Up (2013), Jamaica
- Major Lazer's Walshy Fire Presents: Royally Speaking Mixtape (2014), Jamaica

=== EPs ===
- Hope & Love (2015), Gachapan Records, Japan

=== Albums ===
- Lily of da Valley (2017), Easy Star
- Royal (2021), Easy Star

=== Singles ===
Reference
Title	Release date	Album
"Butterflies"	2011	Major Lazer's Walshy Fire Presents: Royally Speaking Mixtape
"Modern Day Judas"	2012	Misheni
"Feel Your Pain"	2013	In Comes The Small Axe
"This Morning"	2013	In Comes The Small Axe
"Gimme Likkle"	2014	Gimme Likkle
"Finally"	2017	Lilly of the Valley
"Generation"	2017	Lilly of the Valley
"We Matter"	October 26, 2018	(Single)
"Weight On Your Shoulders"	November 29, 2019	(Single)
"Glad To Be" (feat. Randy Valentine)	October 18, 2019	(Single)
"High Tide or Low"	2021	Royal
"LionOrder"	2021	Royal
"Natty Pablo"	2021	Royal
"Rich Forever"	2021	Royal
"Strongest Link"	2021	Royal
"The Weed Song"	2021	Royal

=== Charted singles ===
List of charted singles, showing year released, chart positions and album name
Title	Year	Peak chart position	Album
Title	Year	JAM Air.	Album
"This Morning"	2012	4	Non-album singles
"Tide Is High"	2025	7	Non-album singles

=== Featured in ===
- Sean Paul – "Guns of Navarone" (feat. Jesse Royal, Stonebwoy & Mutabaruka) (2021)
