= Anataban Campaign =

South Sudanese artist collective

Ana Taban
- انا تعبان
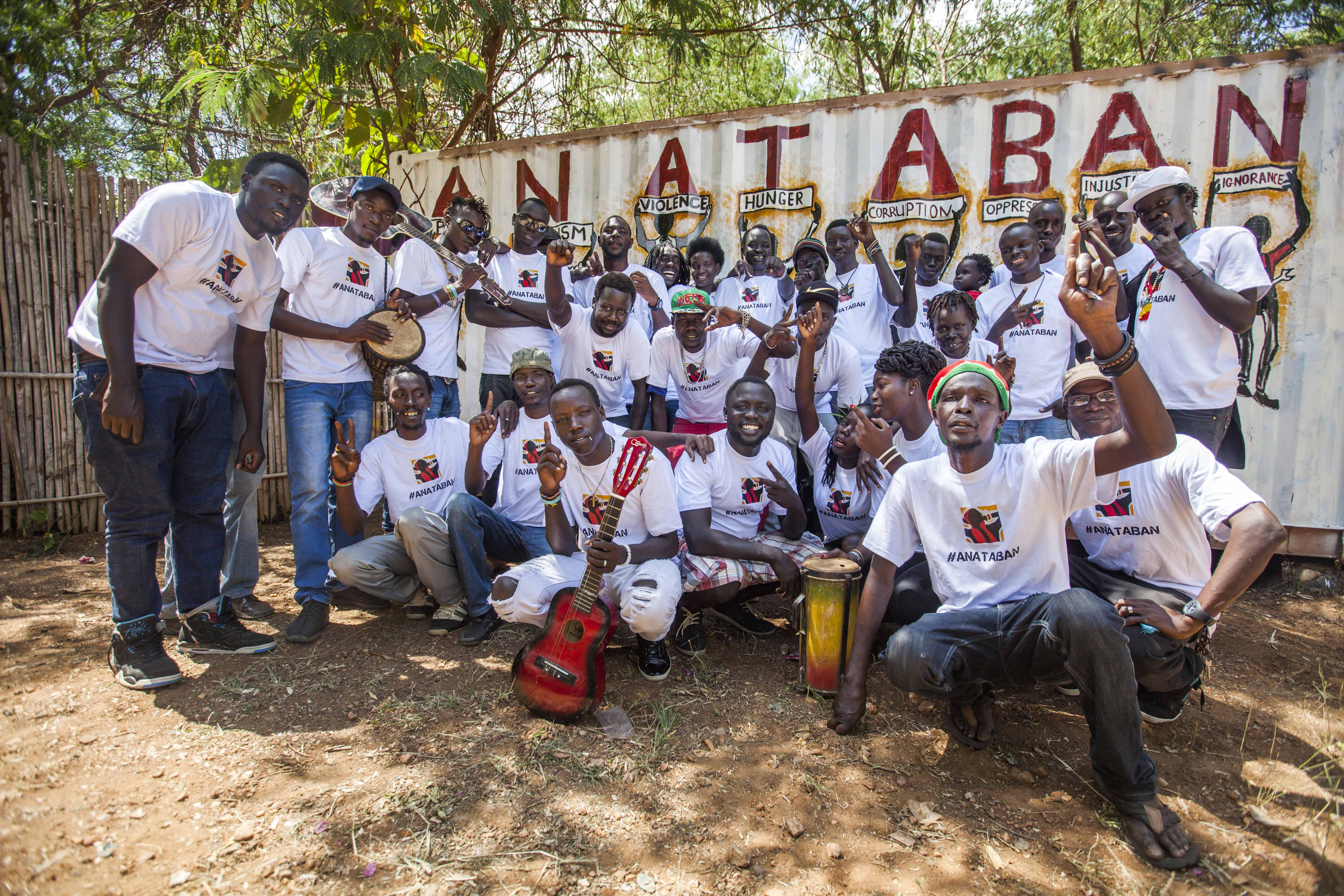
- Anataban members
- Formation: September 1, 2016; 9 years ago
- Location: Juba, South Sudan
- Methods: street theater, street art, sculpture, music and poetry

The Anataban Campaign (Arabic: انا تعبان, Ana Taban, meaning "I am tired") is an artist collective based in Juba, South Sudan. The group uses street theater, graffiti, murals, sculpture and poetry to foster public discussion about the issues of social injustice and government accountability, and transparency. Anataban members see solidarity, courage, integrity, inclusion, non-violence and political neutrality as the important values guiding their work.

== Background ==
The South Sudanese Civil War began in 2013. The people live in fear because there is a high level of armed violence and sexual violence, mostly against women. The conflict has affected food production leading to hunger and poverty.

== History ==
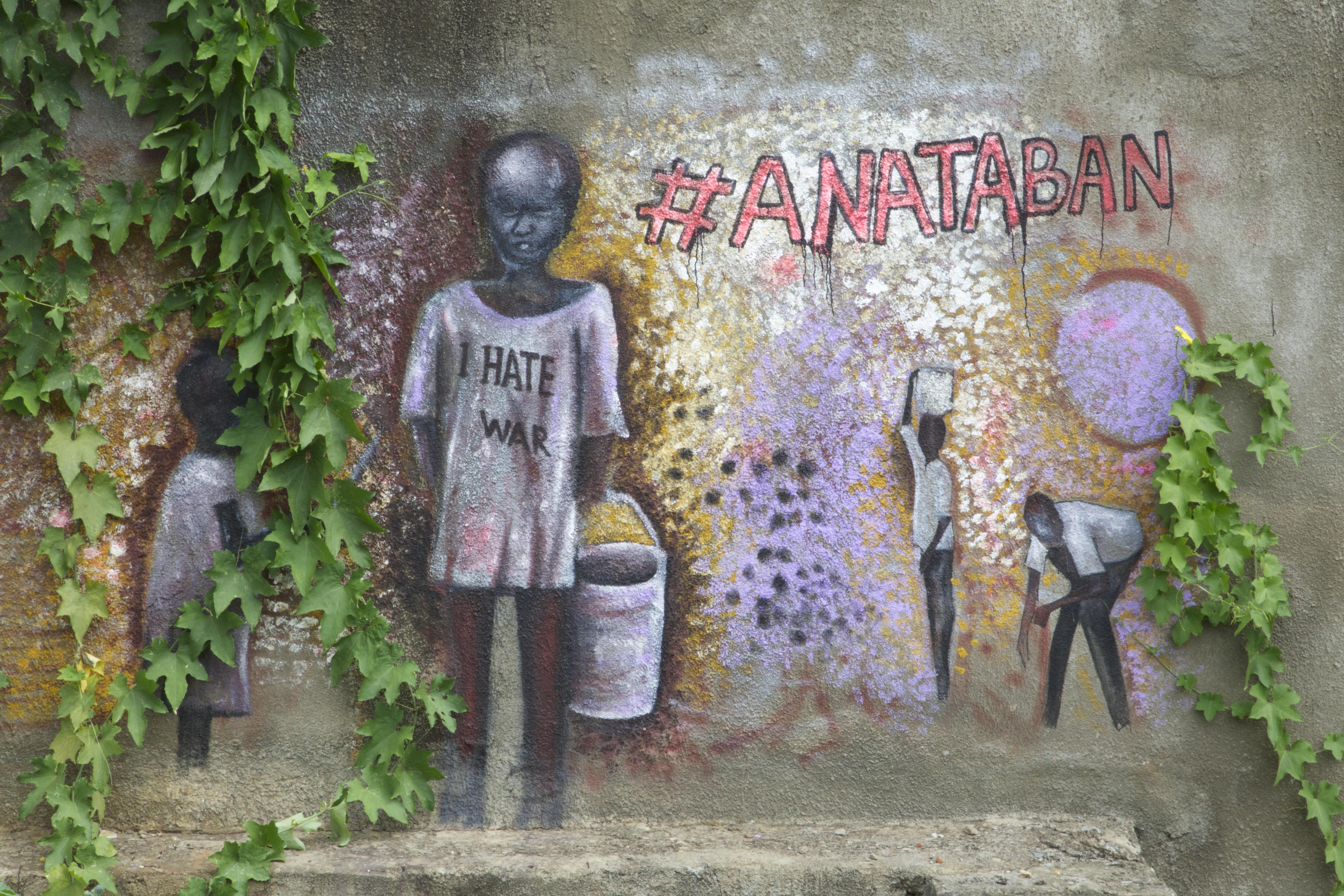
Anataban street art in Juba, South Sudan

In September 2016, Anataban was founded in Juba by a group of South Sudanese visual artists, musicians, actors, poets, and fashion designers. The group was created in response to the South Sudanese Civil War. The campaign emerged from a collaborative workshop held in Naivasha, Kenya, with Pawa 254, a Nairobi-based hub for activists, journalists, and artists. In Juba Arabic, Ana Taban, means "I am tired".

In The Guardian, the Anataban collective said, "We are tired of war and all the suffering that comes with it. We are tired of just sitting by and seeing our country burn. We are tired of having a country with vast natural resources and yet a crashing economy. We are tired of the fact that we have a beautiful cultural diversity that is destroyed by tribal animosity. We are tired of having a starving population yet we have a fertile land. We are tired of being used to kill ourselves for the benefit of a few".

On September 21, 2016, the International Day of Peace Anataban distributed 1000 white handkerchiefs with the message "we are sorry for what we have done to each other" written on them. They spoke with people in the streets, apologizing for what they have had to endure in this country.

In 2017, Anataban launched the campaign "#BloodShedFree2017" It seeks a genuine and permanent ceasefire in South Sudan; security for all citizens; an end to ethnic targeting and violence; protection of the right to free speech; and a return to justice and the rule of law.

On September 14, 2024, it received the "Aglaya International Award" for its contribution to the Culture of Peace, from the Artisophia Foundation, in the Canary Islands (Spain).

== Goals ==
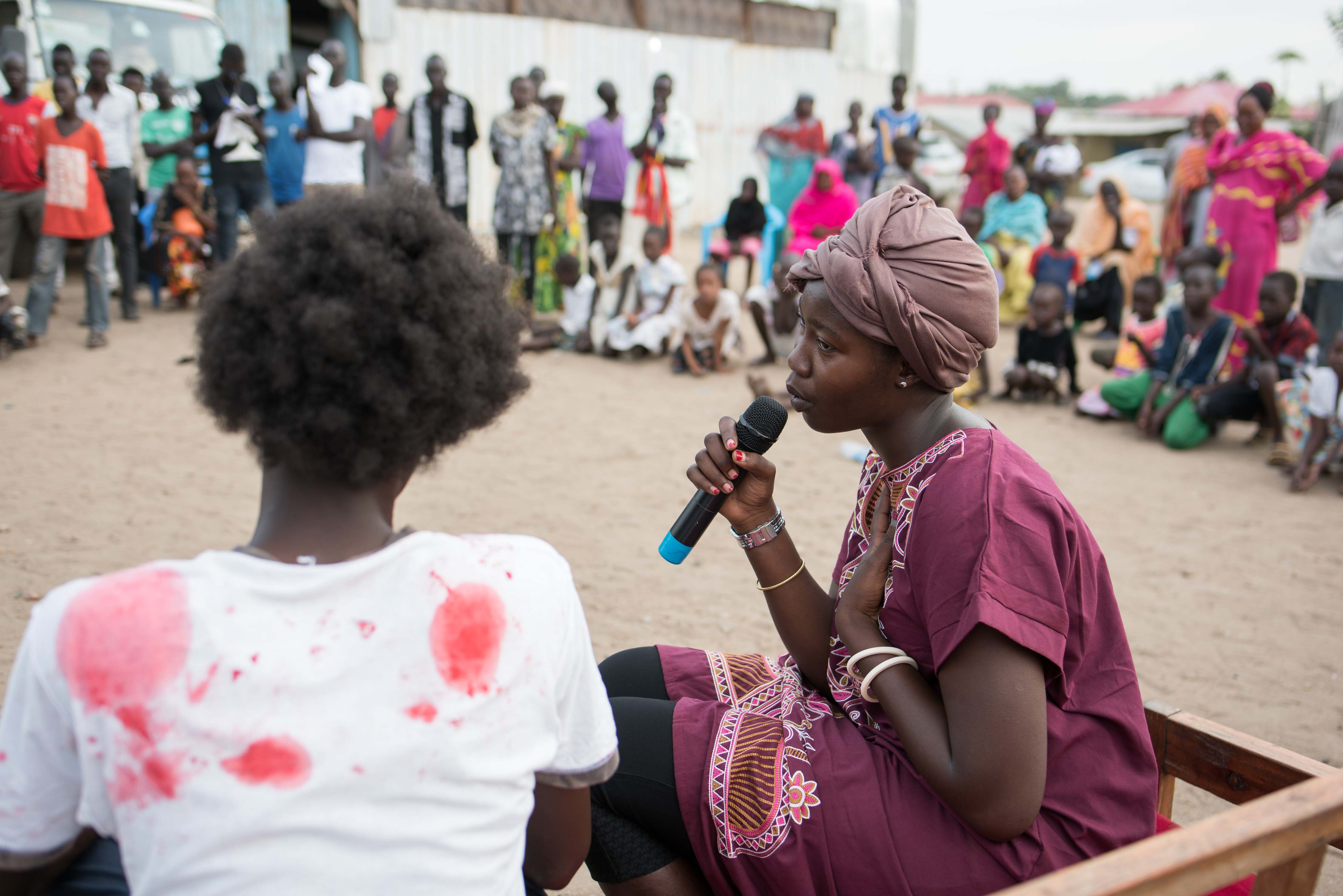
Anataban members perform street theatre in Juba, South Sudan

Anataban's aim is to create a platform for the ordinary South Sudanese citizen to speak out and have their voice heard. Anataban aims to create awareness of the common struggles of the South Sudanese people, especially the insecurity of war. The basis of Anataban's work is to use artivism to engage and mobilize people through community dialogues on the issues affecting them.

Anataban visits various communities with art, music, street theatre, murals, sculptures, and poetry. They use various platforms such as media opportunities and social media to speak out.

== Music ==
Anataban have released two songs. The first, released in 2016, was titled "Ana taban" The song performed well on local radio stations and reached the South Sudanese diaspora via YouTube. The second song was titled "Malesh", an Arabic expression meaning "I am sorry".

== Street art ==
The visual artists of the campaign have painted walls and containers around Juba with images that represent the messages of the campaign. These include anti war messages, and images that represent what the citizens are experiencing in the conflict. Some show positive messages that encourage people to make a difference. This is the first time such street art has been done in Juba.

== Social Media Presence ==
Anataban has a social media presence. The hashtag #Anataban has become a popular phrase used by South Sudanese youth on social media to express their frustration with the ongoing conflict. Anataban have also used short films to spread their ideas. Some of the videos have focused on the problem of hate speech and ethnic targeting.

== Sout Al Salaam Awards ==
Anataban held its first ever Sout Al Salaam Awards in November 2019. The award ceremony was aimed at recognizing different artists of all arts form who have been positive influencers through their art and have played a significant role in peace building in South Sudan. The awards ceremony saw 14 artists being awarded with trophies in different categories. "Sout Al Salaam" is a Juba Arabic for "Voice of Peace".
