= 2022 in rhythm and blues =

This article summarizes the events, album releases, and album release dates in rhythm and blues for the year 2022.

== Events ==
=== January ===
- On January 7, R. Dean Taylor died at the age of 82.
- On January 8, the 36th Golden Disc Awards were held. Enhypen, NCT 127, NCT Dream, Seventeen, and Stray Kids won Album Bonsang for Dimension: Dilemma, Sticker, Hot Sauce, Attacca, and Noeasy, respectively. BTS won the Seezn Most Popular Artist Award. Jeon Somi and The Boyz won Best Performance.
- On January 9, James Mtume died at the age of 76.
- On January 18, Freddie Hughes died from leukemia and COVID-19 at the age of 78.
- On January 23, the 31st Seoul Music Awards were held. NCT 127 won the Grand Award (Daesang). NCT Dream won Best Album Award for Hot Sauce. Exo won the K-wave Popularity Award. Hyuna won the R&B Hiphop Award.
- On January 27, the 11th Gaon Chart Music Awards were held. Taeyeon won December 2020 Artist of the Year – Digital Music for "What Do I Call You". NCT Dream won 2nd Quarter Artist of the Year – Physical Album for Hot Sauce. NCT 127 won 4th Quarter Artist of the Year – Physical Album for Sticker. The Boyz tied for Hot Performance of the Year. Justin Bieber, Daniel Caesar, and Giveon won Song of the Year in International Pop for "Peaches".

=== February ===
- On February 8, the Brit Awards 2022 were held. Adele won British Artist of the Year, British Album of the Year for 30, and British Song of the Year for "Easy on Me". Silk Sonic won International Group of the Year. Inflo won British Producer of the Year.
- On February 9, Betty Davis died from cancer at the age of 77.
- On February 26, the 53rd NAACP Image Awards were held. Jazmine Sullivan won Outstanding Female Artist, Outstanding Album for Heaux Tales, and Outstanding Soul/R&B Song for "Pick Up Your Feelings". Anthony Hamilton won Outstanding Male Artist. Silk Sonic won Outstanding Duo, Group or Collaboration (Traditional) for "Leave the Door Open". Wizkid and Tems won Outstanding Music Video/Visual Album and Outstanding International Song for "Essence". Jay-Z and Jeymes Samuel won Outstanding Soundtrack/Compilation Album for The Harder They Fall Soundtrack.

=== March ===
- On March 2, the NME Awards 2022 were held. Berwyn won Best New Act from the UK. Genesis Owusu won Best Album by an Australian Artist for Smiling with No Teeth.
- On March 11, Timmy Thomas died from cancer at the age of 77.
- On March 12, Traci Braxton died from esophageal cancer at the age of 50.
- On March 14, Eric Mercury died from pancreatic cancer at the age of 77.
- On March 22, the 2022 iHeartRadio Music Awards were held. Silk Sonic won Best Duo/Group of the Year, R&B Album of the Year for An Evening with Silk Sonic, and R&B Song of the Year for "Leave the Door Open". Pop Smoke won Hip-Hop Song of the Year for "What You Know Bout Love". Yung Bleu won Best New Hip-Hop Artist. Drake won Hip-Hop Artist of the Year. Jazmine Sullivan won R&B Artist of the Year. Giveon won Best New R&B Artist. Omer Fedi won Songwriter of the Year.
- On March 25, Keith Martin died from a heart attack at the age of 55. On the same day, Bobby Hendricks died of complications from Alzheimer's disease at the age of 84.

=== April ===
- On April 3, the 64th Annual Grammy Awards were held. Silk Sonic won Record of the Year, Song of the Year, Best R&B Song, and tied for Best R&B Performance for "Leave the Door Open". Jazmine Sullivan won Best R&B Album for Heaux Tales and tied for Best R&B Performance for "Pick Up Your Feelings". Jon Batiste won Album of the Year for We Are and Best Music Video for "Freedom". Doja Cat and SZA won Best Pop Duo/Group Performance for "Kiss Me More". H.E.R. won Best Traditional R&B Performance for "Fight for You". Lucky Daye won Best Progressive R&B Album for Table for Two. Alicia Keys won Best Immersive Audio Album for Alicia. Summer of Soul won Best Music Film.
- On April 12, Charles McCormick died at the age of 75.
- On April 14, the 2022 Global Awards were held. Anne-Marie won Best Female.
- On April 25, Jimmy Thomas died at the age of 83.

=== May ===
- On May 3, the APRA Music Awards of 2022 were held. Budjerah won Most Performed R&B / Soul Work for "Higher".
- On May 15, the 2022 Billboard Music Awards were held. Drake won Top Artist, Top Male Artist, Top Rap Artist, and Top Rap Male Artist. Doja Cat won Top R&B Artist, Top R&B Female, and Top R&B Album for Planet Her. BTS won Top Duo/Group and Top Song Sales Artist. The Weeknd won Top R&B Male Artist. Bruno Mars won Top R&B Tour for Bruno Mars at Park MGM. Silk Sonic won Top R&B Song for "Leave the Door Open". Omarion and Bow Wow won Top Rap Tour for The Millennium Tour 2021. Kali Uchis won Top Latin Female Artist and Top Latin Song for "Telepatía". Mary J. Blige won the Icon Award. On the same day, the Juno Awards of 2022 were held. The Weeknd won Songwriter of the Year and Contemporary R&B/Soul Recording of the Year for "Take My Breath". WondaGurl won Producer of the Year. Mustafa won Alternative Album of the Year for When Smoke Rises. Savannah Ré won Traditional R&B/Soul Recording of the Year for "24hrs".

=== June ===
- On June 16, the 2022 Libera Awards were held. Cautious Clay won Self-Released Record of the Year for Deadpan Love. Christone "Kingfish" Ingram and Cedric Burnside tied for Best Blues Record with 662 and I Be Trying, respectively. Little Simz won Best Hip-Hop/Rap Record for Sometimes I Might Be Introvert. Arlo Parks won Best Pop Record for Collapsed in Sunbeams. Hiatus Kaiyote won Best R&B Record for Mood Valiant.
- On June 18, Adibah Noor died from ovarian cancer at the age of 51.
- On June 26, the BET Awards 2022 were held. Silk Sonic won Album of the Year for An Evening with Silk Sonic and tied for Video of the Year for "Smokin out the Window". Wizkid, Justin Bieber, and Tems won Best Collaboration for "Essence". Jazmine Sullivan won Best Female R&B/Pop Artist. The Weeknd won Best Male R&B/Pop Artist. Silk Sonic won Best Group. Mary J. Blige won the BET Her Award for "Good Morning Gorgeous".

=== August ===
- On August 4, the AIR Awards of 2022 were held. Genesis Owusu won Independent Album of the Year for Smiling with No Teeth and Independent Song of the Year for "Smiling with No Teeth". Emma Donovan & the Putbacks won Best Independent Soul/R&B Album or EP for Under These Streets.
- On August 25, Mable John died at the age of 91.
- On August 28, the 2022 MTV Video Music Awards were held. The Weeknd won Best R&B for "Out of Time". BTS won Group of the Year. Doja Cat won Best Choreography for "Woman".

=== September ===
- On September 12, PnB Rock was shot and killed at the age of 30.
- On September 13, Jesse Powell died at the age of 51.
- On September 16, Marva Hicks died at the age of 66.
- On September 29, the 2022 Billboard Latin Music Awards were held. Bad Bunny won Top Latin Album of the Year and Latin Rhythm Album of the Year for Un Verano Sin Ti. Aventura and Bad Bunny won Tropical Song of the Year for "Volví". Prince Royce won Solo Tropical Artist of the Year. Marc Anthony won Tropical Album of the Year for Pa'lla Voy.

=== October ===
- On October 13, Joyce Sims died at the age of 63.
- On October 27, the 2022 UK Music Video Awards were held. Michael Kiwanuka won Best R&B/Soul Video - UK for "Beautiful Life". Omar Apollo and Daniel Caesar won Best R&B/Soul Video - International for "Invincible". Little Simz and Obongjayar won Best Hip Hop/Grime/Rap Video - UK, Best Wardrobe Styling in a Video, and Best Colour Grading in a Video for "Point and Kill". Khazali won Best R&B/Soul Video - Newcomer for "Better with the Devil". Obongjayar won Best Live Video for "I Wish It Was Me". On the same day, Geraldine Hunt died at the age of 77.
- On October 28, Jerry Lee Lewis died at the age of 87.

=== November ===
- On November 3, Noel McKoy died at the age of 60.
- On November 4, the Los 40 Music Awards 2022 were held. Tiago PZK won Best New Global Latin Act.
- On November 5, Aaron Carter died from drowning at the age of 34.
- On November 6, Lionel Richie was inducted into the Rock and Roll Hall of Fame.
- On November 8, the 2022 Genie Music Awards were held. NCT Dream won Singer of the Year (Daesang) and Album of the Year (Daesang) for Glitch Mode. Red Velvet won Best Female Performance Award. The Boyz won Best Male Performance Award. Taeyeon won Best Female Solo Artist. BTS won Best Male Group.
- On November 16, the 13th Hollywood Music in Media Awards were held. "Willing to Trust" from Entergalactic won Original Song – TV Movie Streamed. "Lift Me Up" from Black Panther: Wakanda Forever won Original Song – Feature Film. Elvis (Original Motion Picture Soundtrack) won Soundtrack Album.
- On November 16, the 2022 J Awards were held. Elsy Wameyo won Unearthed Artist of the Year.
- On November 17, B. Smyth died from pulmonary fibrosis at the age of 30.
- On November 20, the American Music Awards of 2022 were held. Beyoncé won Favorite Female R&B Artist and Favorite R&B Album for Renaissance. Wizkid and Tems won Favorite R&B Song for "Essence". Chris Brown won Favorite Male R&B Artist. BTS won Favorite Pop Duo or Group and Favorite K-pop Artist.
- On November 24, the 2022 ARIA Music Awards were held. William Crighton won Best Blues & Roots Album for Water and Dust. Budjerah won Best Soul/R&B Release for Conversations.
- On November 26, the 2022 Soul Train Music Awards were held. Beyoncé won Album of the Year for Renaissance and Song of the Year for "Break My Soul". Jazmine Sullivan won Best R&B/Soul Female Artist. Chris Brown won Best R&B/Soul Male Artist. Tems won Best New Artist. Mary J. Blige won Soul Train Certified Award. Silk Sonic won Video of the Year for "Smokin out the Window". Lizzo won Best Dance Performance for "About Damn Time". Ronald Isley, The Isley Brothers, and Beyoncé won Best Collaboration for "Make Me Say It Again, Girl". Muni Long won The Ashford & Simpson Songwriter's Award for "Hrs and Hrs". On the same day, the 2022 Melon Music Awards were held. BTS won Record of the Year (Daesang) and Best Male Group. IU won Best Female Solo and Stage of the Year for The Golden Hour: Under the Orange Sun. NewJeans tied for Best New Artist. 10cm and Big Naughty won Best Collaboration for "Beyond Love".
- On November 30, Christine McVie died from a stroke at the age of 79.

=== December ===
- On December 10, J. J. Barnes died at the age of 79.
- On December 13, the 2022 Music Victoria Awards were held. Mo'Ju won Best Soul, Funk, RNB & Gospel Work.
- On December 31, Anita Pointer died from cancer at the age of 74.

== Released albums ==
=== January ===
Day	Artist(s)	Album	Record label(s)	Entering chart position
4	MonoNeon	Put On Earth For You	Self-released	
7	Dope Lemon	Rose Pink Cadillac	BMG	Debuted at No. 2 on the ARIA Charts
7	Eric Nam	There and Back Again	Self-released	
7	Mary Wilson	Mary Wilson: The Motown Anthology	UMG, Motown, Real Gone Music, Second Disc Records	
7	The Weeknd	Dawn FM	XO, Republic	Debuted at No. 2 on the Billboard 200
14	FKA Twigs	Caprisongs	Young, Atlantic	Debuted at No. 42 on the UK Albums Chart
14	Nick Grant	Welcome to Loveland	Kids Make Money, 21 Grms	
14	Urias	FÚRIA	Mataderos	
16	Wheein	Whee	The L1ve	
18	BamBam	B	Abyss Company	Debuted at No. 5 on the Circle Album Chart
19	Hikaru Utada	Bad Mode	Epic Japan, Sony Japan	Debuted at No. 1 on the Oricon Charts
21	Les Louanges	Crash	Bonsound	
21	Various artists	Summer of Soul (...Or, When the Revolution Could Not Be Televised) [Original Motion Picture Soundtrack]	Legacy Recordings	Debuted at No. 12 on the Billboard 200
26	Baco Exu do Blues	QVVJFA?	999	
26	Def.	Love	528Hz	Debuted at No. 3 on the Circle Album Chart
28	Amber Mark	Three Dimensions Deep	PMR, EMI, Interscope	
28	Eric Gales	Crown	Mascot Label Group, Provogue	
28	John Mayall	The Sun Is Shining Down	Forty Below	
28	Lady Wray	Piece of Me	Big Crown Records	Debuted at No. 43 on the UK Independent Albums Chart
28	Maverick Sabre	Don't Forget to Look Up	FAMM	
28	North Mississippi Allstars	Set Sail	New West	
28	Pink Sweats	Pink Moon	Atlantic	
28	Samm Henshaw	Untidy Soul	Dorm Seven, AWAL	
28	St. Paul and The Broken Bones	The Alien Coast	ATO Records	
28	The Temptations	Temptations 60	UMe	
30	Kyle	It's Not So Bad	Self-released	

=== February ===
Day	Artist(s)	Album	Record label(s)	Entering chart position
2	Ivy Sole	Candid	Venice Music	
2	Marques Houston	Me	Phoenix, Corite	
4	Adekunle Gold	Catch Me If You Can	Afro Urban	
7	J. Holiday	Time	HMG, MilknSizz, Empire	
10	Gloria Groove	Lady Leste	SB Music, Sony Music Brazil	
11	Adria Kain	When Flowers Bloom	ArtHaus, Venice	
11	Boulevards	Electric Cowboy: Born in Carolina Mud	Normaltown	
11	Joss Stone	Never Forget My Love	Bay Street	
11	Mary J. Blige	Good Morning Gorgeous	300, Mary Jane	Debuted at No. 14 on the Billboard 200
11	Moonchild	Starfruit	Tru Thoughts	
11	Raveena	Asha's Awakening	Warner Records	
11	William Crighton	Water and Dust	ABC Music	
13	Mozzik	Lamboziki	2 Euro Gang, Urban	Debuted at No. 42 on the Schweizer Hitparade Chart
15	Treasure	The Second Step: Chapter One	YG	Debuted at No. 1 on the Circle Album Chart
17	Smiley	Mai Mult De-O Viață	Cat Music, HaHaHa Production	
18	Big K.R.I.T.	Digital Roses Don't Die	BMG	
18	Khruangbin & Leon Bridges	Texas Moon	Dead Oceans, LisaSawyer63, Columbia, Sony Music	
18	Kendra Morris	Nine Lives	Karma Chief	
23	Ai	Dream	EMI, Universal	Debuted at No. 12 on the Oricon Charts
23	Billlie	The Collective Soul and Unconscious: Chapter One	Mystic Story	Debuted at No. 5 on the Circle Album Chart
23	Dreamer Isioma	Goodnight Dreamer	AWAL	
25	Blue Lab Beats	Motherland Journey	Blue Adventure, Decca Records France	
25	EarthGang	Ghetto Gods	Dreamville, Interscope, Spillage Village	
25	Robert Glasper	Black Radio III	Loma Vista	Debuted at No. 46 on the Oricon Charts
25	Sevdaliza	Raving Dahlia	Twisted Elegance	
25	Swamp Dogg	I Need a Job...So I Can Buy More Auto-Tune	Don Giovanni	

=== March ===
Day	Artist(s)	Album	Record label(s)	Entering chart position
4	Cruel Santino	Subaru Boys: Final Heaven	Interscope, Monster Boy	
4	Elyanna	Elyanna II	El Mar	
4	Kaina	It Was a Home	City Slang	
4	Kojey Radical	Reason to Smile	Asylum, Atlantic	Debuted at No. 11 on the UK Albums Chart
4	Léon	Circles	LL Entertainment, BMG	
4	Maylee Todd	Maloo	Stones Throw	
4	Michelle	After Dinner We Talk Dreams	Atlantic, Transgressive	
7	Jackson Wang	Lost & Found	Team Wang Records	
10	Lucky Daye	Candydrip	Keep Cool, RCA	Debuted at No. 69 on the Billboard 200
11	Orion Sun	Getaway	Mom+Pop	
11	Shenseea	Alpha	Rich Immigrants, Interscope	
14	(G)I-dle	I Never Die	Cube, Kakao	Debuted at No. 2 on the Circle Album Chart
18	Vanessa Amorosi	City of Angels	Scream Louder	Debuted at No. 7 on the ARIA Charts
18	Zelooperz	Get WeT.Radio	Bruiser Brigade	
21	Red Velvet	The ReVe Festival 2022 – Feel My Rhythm	SM, Dreamus	Debuted at No. 1 on the Circle Album Chart
23	Fujii Kaze	Love All Serve All	Hehn, Universal Sigma	
24	Rema	Rave & Roses	Jonzing World, Mavin	
25	Fana Hues	Flora + Fana	Sweet Virtue, Westminster, Bright Antenna	
25	Keshi	Gabriel	Island	
25	Koffee	Gifted	Promised Land, Columbia	
25	Kristian Bush	52 | ATL x BNA	Big Machine	
25	Latto	777	RCA, Streamcut	Debuted at No. 15 on the Billboard 200
25	Majeeed	Bitter Sweet	Dream Empire Music	
28	NCT Dream	Glitch Mode	SM, Dreamus	Debuted at No. 1 on the Circle Album Chart
29	Purple Kiss	MemeM	RBW, Kakao	Debuted at No. 7 on the Circle Album Chart
30	Alex Isley & Jack Dine	Marigold	Indie	

=== April ===
Day	Artist(s)	Album	Record label(s)	Entering chart position
1	Eric Roberson	Lessons	Blue Erro Soul	
1	King Garbage	Heavy Metal Greasy Love	Ipecac	
2	Dope Saint Jude	Higher Self	Yotanka	
4	Suho	Grey Suit	SM	Debuted at No. 2 on the Circle Album Chart
8	Banks	Serpentina	AWAL	Debuted at No. 39 on the UK Albums Chart
8	Budjerah	Conversations	Warner Music Australia	Debuted at No. 97 on the ARIA Charts
8	Omar Apollo	Ivory	Warner	Debuted at No. 74 on the Billboard 200
8	Syd	Broken Hearts Club	Columbia Records	
12	Anitta	Versions of Me	Warner	
13	Marian Hill	Why Can't We Just Pretend?	Photo Finish	
13	Sault	Air	Forever Living Originals	
15	Edgar Winter	Brother Johnny	Quarto Valley Records	
22	Ben Marc	Glass Effect	Innovative Leisure	
22	Blxst	Before You Go	Evgle, Red Bull	Debuted at No. 90 on the Billboard 200
22	King Gizzard & the Lizard Wizard	Omnium Gatherum	KGLW	Debuted at No. 12 on the UK Albums Chart
25	Sidhu Moose Wala	No Name	Self-released	Debuted at No. 50 on the Canadian Albums Chart
27	Miyeon	My	Cube, Kakao	Debuted at No. 4 on the Circle Album Chart
29	Eli "Paperboy" Reed	Down Every Road	Yep Roc	
29	Kehlani	Blue Water Road	Atlantic, TSNMI	Debuted at No. 13 on the Billboard 200
29	Melba Moore	Imagine	The Gallery Entertainment, Orpheus Enterprises	
29	PJ Morton	Watch the Sun	Morton Records, Empire	
29	Trombone Shorty	Lifted	Blue Note, UMG	
30	Exile Atsushi	One	Rhythm Zone	

=== May ===
Day	Artist(s)	Album	Record label(s)	Entering chart position
2	Le Sserafim	Fearless	Source, YG Plus	Debuted at No. 2 on the Circle Album Chart
5	Kenyon Dixon	Closer	Self-released	
6	Bad Bunny	Un Verano Sin Ti	Rimas	Debuted at No. 1 on the Billboard 200
6	Ella Mai	Heart on My Sleeve	10 Summers, Interscope	Debuted at No. 15 on the Billboard 200
6	Emeli Sandé	Let's Say for Instance	Chrysalis	Debuted at No. 27 on the UK Albums Chart
6	Ibeyi	Spell 31	XL	
6	Sabrina Claudio	Based On A Feeling	SC, Atlantic	
11	Dylan Sinclair	No Longer in the Suburbs	Five Stone Records	
13	Becky G	Esquemas	Kemosabe, RCA, Sony Latin	Debuted at No. 92 on the Billboard 200
13	The Black Keys	Dropout Boogie	Easy Eye Sound, Nonesuch	Debuted at No. 5 on the UK Albums Chart
13	Obongjayar	Some Nights I Dream of Doors	September Recordings	
13	Sam Gendel & Antonia Cytrynowicz	Live a Little	Psychic Hotline	
13	Tank and the Bangas	Red Balloon	Verve Forecast, UMG	
20	Ericdoa	Things with Wings	Listen to the Kids, Interscope	
20	Levon Helm & Mavis Staples	Carry Me Home	ANTI-	
20	Ravyn Lenae	Hypnos	Atlantic	
20	Van Morrison	What's It Gonna Take?	Exile, Virgin	Debuted at No. 7 on the Schweizer Hitparade Chart
23	Got7	Got7	Warner Korea	Debuted at No. 2 on the Circle Album Chart
26	UMI	Forest in the City	Keep Cool, RCA	
27	Alfie Templeman	Mellow Moon	Chess Club	Debuted at No. 31 on the UK Albums Chart
27	Brian Jackson	This Is Brian Jackson	BBE Music	
27	Murkage Dave	The City Needs A Hero	None	
31	Emilia	Tú Crees en Mí?	Sony Music Latin	Debuted at No. 49 on the Spanish Albums Chart

=== June ===
Day	Artist(s)	Album	Record label(s)	Entering chart position
3	070 Shake	You Can't Kill Me	GOOD, Def Jam	
3	Arin Ray	Hello Poison	Interscope	
3	Fantastic Negrito	White Jesus Black Problems	Storefront Records	
3	Kat Graham	Long Hot Summer	Sound Zoo Records	
3	Post Malone	Twelve Carat Toothache	Republic, Mercury	Debuted at No. 2 on the Billboard 200
3	Tedeschi Trucks Band	I Am the Moon: I. Crescent	Swamp Family, Fantasy, Concord	
3	Vory	Lost Souls	UMG Recordings, Dream Chasers Records	
3	Xênia França	Em Nome Da Estrela	Self-released	
10	FKJ	Vincent	Mom+Pop	
10	Tauren Wells	Joy in the Morning	Capitol CMG	
16	Hank Williams Jr.	Rich White Honky Blues	Easy Eye Sound	Debuted at No. 183 on the Billboard 200
17	Drake	Honestly, Nevermind	OVO, Republic	Debuted at No. 1 on the Billboard 200
17	Yaya Bey	Remember Your North Star	Big Dada	
20	Kep1er	Doublast	Wake One, Swing	Debuted at No. 2 on the Circle Album Chart
24	Chris Brown	Breezy	CBE, RCA	Debuted at No. 4 on the Billboard 200
24	Giveon	Give or Take	Not So Fast, Epic	Debuted at No. 11 on the Billboard 200
24	Theo Croker	Love Quantum	Sony Masterworks	
24	Various artists	Elvis (Original Motion Picture Soundtrack)	RCA	Debuted at No. 26 on the Billboard 200

=== July ===
Day	Artist(s)	Album	Record label(s)	Entering chart position
1	Moor Mother	Jazz Codes	Anti	
1	Paolo Nutini	Last Night in the Bittersweet	Atlantic	Debuted at No. 1 on the UK Albums Chart
1	Various artists	Minions: The Rise of Gru (Original Motion Picture Soundtrack)	Decca Records	
5	Felivand	Ties	Sweat It Out	
8	Brent Faiyaz	Wasteland	Lost Kids, Venice, Stem	Debuted at No. 2 on the Billboard 200
8	Burna Boy	Love, Damini	Atlantic	Debuted at No. 2 on the UK Albums Chart
8	Flo	The Lead	Island	
8	Tasman Keith	A Colour Undone	AWAL	
15	Cory Henry	Operation Funk	Henry House, Culture Collective	
15	Lil Silva	Yesterday is Heavy	Nowhere Music, Platoon	
15	Lizzo	Special	Nice Life, Atlantic	Debuted at No. 2 on the Billboard 200
15	Mabel	About Last Night...	Polydor UK	Debuted at No. 2 on the UK Albums Chart
15	Original Broadway cast of MJ the Musical	MJ (Original Broadway Cast Recording)	Sony	Debuted at No. 88 on the UK Albums Chart
15	Ne-Yo	Self Explanatory	Compound, Motown	Debuted at No. 184 on the Billboard 200
15	Steve Lacy	Gemini Rights	RCA	Debuted at No. 7 on the Billboard 200
15	Tami Neilson	Kingmaker	Neilson Records, Southbound	Debuted at No. 1 on the New Zealand Albums Chart
21	Waje	Waje 2.0	Continued Entertainment	
22	Ben Harper	Bloodline Maintenance	Chrysalis	
22	Montell Fish	Jamie	Lord's Child	
29	Beyoncé	Renaissance	Parkwood, Columbia	Debuted at No. 1 on the Billboard 200
29	Domi and JD Beck	Not Tight	Blue Note, UMG, Apeshit	
29	DPR Ian	Moodswings in to Order	DPR	Debuted at No. 30 on the Circle Album Chart
29	S-X	Things Change	RBC, BMG	
29	Wiz Khalifa	Multiverse	Taylor Gang, Asylum	

=== August ===
Day	Artist(s)	Album	Record label(s)	Entering chart position
1	NewJeans	New Jeans	ADOR	Debuted at No. 1 on the Circle Album Chart
4	Heather Small	Colour My Life	East West	
5	Black Party	Hummingbird	Wolf + Rothstein, RCA	
5	Calvin Harris	Funk Wav Bounces Vol. 2	Columbia	Debuted at No. 5 on the UK Albums Chart
5	Kokoroko	Could We Be More	Brownswood	
12	Jimmy Cliff	Refugees	Sunpower Productions NY, UMG	
12	Niki	Nicole	88rising	
12	Rod Wave	Beautiful Mind	Alamo	Debuted at No. 1 on the Billboard 200
19	Tank	R&B Money	R&B Money, Atlantic	
19	Terence Etc.	Vortex	Brainfeeder	
19	Tink	Pillow Talk	Winter's Diary, Empire	Debuted at No. 43 on the Billboard 200
19	Triathalon	Spin	Lex Records	
26	Bnxn	Bad Since '97	TYE, Empire Distribution	Debuted at No. 14 on the Nigeria Albums Chart
26	Jacob Banks	Lies About the War	Nobody Records	
26	Thee Sacred Souls	Thee Sacred Souls	Daptone Records	
31	Ari Lennox	Away Message	Dreamville, Interscope	
31	Billlie	The Billage of Perception: Chapter Two	Mystic Story, Kakao	Debuted at No. 3 on the Circle Album Chart
31	Waje	Unbroken	Continued Entertainment	

=== September ===
Day	Artist(s)	Album	Record label(s)	Entering chart position
1	Romeo Santos	Formula, Vol. 3	Sony Latin	Debuted at No. 10 on the Billboard 200
9	Ari Lennox	Age/Sex/Location	Dreamville, Interscope	Debuted at No. 69 on the Billboard 200
9	Charles Stepney	Step on Step	International Anthem	
9	John Legend	Legend	John Legend, Republic	Debuted at No. 59 on the Billboard 200
9	Son Little	Like Neptune	Anti	
9	Sudan Archives	Natural Brown Prom Queen	Stones Throw	
9	Tedeschi Trucks Band	I Am the Moon	Fantasy Records	
15	pH-1	But for Now Leave Me Alone	H1ghr Music	Debuted at No. 24 on the Circle Album Chart
16	Bazzi	Infinite Dream	Atlantic	
16	Butcher Brown	Butcher Brown Presents Triple Trey	Concord Jazz	
16	Danielle Ponder	Some of Us Are Brave	Future Classic	
16	Dixson	004Daisy	Roc Nation	
16	Eliza	A Sky Without Stars	Log Off, Different Recordings, PIAS	
16	Jessie Reyez	Yessie	FMLY, Island	
16	Mura Masa	Demon Time	Polydor, Anchor Point	
16	NCT 127	2 Baddies	SM	Debuted at No. 3 on the Billboard 200
16	Samara Joy	Linger Awhile	Verve	Debuted at No. 158 on the Billboard 200
16	Sole	Imagine Club	Amoeba Culture	
21	Jay B	Be Yourself	CDNZA	Debuted at No. 7 on the Circle Album Chart
22	Jully Black	Three Rocks and a Slingshot	Self-released	
23	Dr. John	Things Happen That Way	Rounder Records	
23	Durand Bernarr	Wanderlust	Dsing	
23	Marisa Anderson	Still, Here	Thrill Jockey	
23	Muni Long	Public Displays of Affection: The Album	Supergiant, Def Jam, UMG	
23	Vieux Farka Touré & Khruangbin	Ali	Dead Oceans	Debuted at No. 47 on the UK Albums Chart
26	Xiumin	Brand New	SM Entertainment, Dreamus	
30	2022 Broadway cast of Into the Woods	Into the Woods (2022 Broadway Cast Recording)	Craft Recordings, Concord	
30	Buddy Guy	The Blues Don't Lie	RCA, Silvertone	Debuted at No. 17 on the Schweizer Hitparade Chart
30	Craig David	22	TS5, Moor	Debuted at No. 7 on the UK Albums Chart
30	Gabriels	Angels & Queens – Part I	Atlas Artists	Debuted at No. 4 on the Scottish Albums Chart
30	Gloria Scott	So Wonderful	Acid Jazz Acquisitions, MK Music	
30	Joss Stone	Merry Christmas, Love	S-Curve	
30	Kid Cudi	Entergalactic	Wicked Awesome, Republic	Debuted at No. 13 on the Billboard 200
30	Shygirl	Nymph	Because Music, Nuxxe	Debuted at No. 12 on the Scottish Albums Chart
30	Snarky Puppy	Empire Central	GroundUP	
30	Tory Lanez	Sorry 4 What	One Umbrella, Create	Debuted at No. 5 on the Canadian Albums Chart

=== October ===
Day	Artist(s)	Album	Record label(s)	Entering chart position
4	Seulgi	28 Reasons	SM, Dreamus	Debuted at No. 3 on the Circle Album Chart
4	Treasure	The Second Step: Chapter Two	YG, YG Plus	Debuted at No. 2 on the Circle Album Chart
7	Nnamdï	Please Have a Seat	Secretly Canadian, Sooper	
7	Say She She	Prism	Colemine, Karma Chief Records	
7	Stray Kids	Maxident	JYP, Republic	Debuted at No. 1 on the Billboard 200
10	Sault	10	Forever Living Originals	
12	Bipolar Sunshine	3034	Noize	
14	Charlotte Dos Santos	Morfo	Because Music	
14	Dillon	6abotage	BPitch Control	
14	Jon Vinyl	Palisade	Vinyl Recordings	
14	Lolo Zouaï	Playgirl	RCA	
14	Ojerime	Bad Influence	Never Seven	
17	Lee Chan-hyuk	Error	YG, YG Plus	Debuted at No. 56 on the Circle Album Chart
21	Babyface	Girls Night Out	Capitol	Debuted at No. 166 on the Billboard 200
21	Meghan Trainor	Takin' It Back	Epic	
21	Nick Hakim	Cometa	ATO Records	
21	Pip Millett	When Everything Is Better, I'll Let You Know	Dream Life Records, Sony Music	
28	Blaqbonez	Young Preacher	Chocolate City	
28	Dvsn	Working On My Karma	OVO	
28	King Gizzard & the Lizard Wizard	Changes	KGLW	Debuted at No. 4 on the ARIA Charts
28	Palmistry	Tinkerbell	Self-released	
28	RealestK	Dreams 2 Reality	Columbia, D2R	
28	Smino	Luv 4 Rent	Zero Fatigue, Motown	Debuted at No. 50 on the Billboard 200
28	The Brother Moves On	$/He Who Feeds You...Owns You	Native Rebel Recordings	

=== November ===
Day	Artist(s)	Album	Record label(s)	Entering chart position
1	Lee Fields	Sentimental Fool	Daptone	
1	Sault	11	Forever Living Originals	
1	Sault	Aiir	Forever Living Originals	
1	Sault	Earth	Forever Living Originals	
1	Sault	Today & Tomorrow	Forever Living Originals	
1	Sault	Untitled (God)	Forever Living Originals	
1	Tóc Tiên	Cong	Yin Yang Media	
2	RM	Indigo	Big Hit	Debuted at No. 2 on the Circle Album Chart
4	Alicia Keys	Santa Baby	Mom + Pop	Debuted at No. 148 on the Billboard 200
4	Coco Jones	What I Didn't Tell You	High Standardz, Def Jam	
4	Ezra Collective	Where I’m Meant To Be	Partisan	
4	Joji	Smithereens	88rising, Warner	Debuted at No. 5 on the Billboard 200
4	MorMor	Semblance	Don't Guess	
4	TheHonestGuy	How to Make Love	Self-released	
4	Various artists	Black Panther: Wakanda Forever – Music from and Inspired By	Roc Nation, Def Jam, Hollywood	Debuted at No. 12 on the Billboard 200
7	Aaron Carter	Blacklisted	Rakkaus	
7	Matt Watson	See You There	Awful Treasures	
9	May J.	Bittersweet Song Covers	Rhythm Zone	
9	Mount Kimbie	MK 3.5: Die Cuts | City Planning	Warp	
10	DRAM	What Had Happened Was...	Waver	
10	Morris Day	Last Call	Bungalo Records, Universal Music Group	
11	Ana Moura	Casa Guilhermina	Self-released	
11	Bruce Springsteen	Only the Strong Survive	Columbia	Debuted at No. 3 on the ARIA Charts
11	Fitz and the Tantrums	Let Yourself Free	Elektra	
11	Gashi	Elevators	RCA	
11	Lous and the Yakuza	Iota	Sony Music France	
11	Reneé Rapp	Everything to Everyone	Interscope	
11	Vector	Teslìm: The Energy Still Lives in Me	GRAP Entertainment, ONErpm	
11	Winston Surfshirt	Panna Cotta	Sweat It Out, BMG	
11	Wizkid	More Love, Less Ego	RCA, Starboy	Debuted at No. 1 on the Nigeria Albums Chart
11	Yuna	Y5	Yuna Room Records	
11	Yung Bleu	Tantra	Empire, Moon Boy	Debuted at No. 99 on the Billboard 200
18	Amos Lee	My Ideal: A Tribute to Chet Baker Sings	Dualtone Records	
18	B.I	Love or Loved	131, Transparent Arts	Debuted at No. 11 on the Circle Album Chart
18	Bibi	Lowlife Princess: Noir	Feel Ghood, 88rising	Debuted at No. 7 on the Circle Album Chart
18	Fousheé	Softcore	Trackmasters, RCA	
18	Ledisi	Remember Me: The Mahalia Jackson Story—Original Motion Picture Soundtrack	ENME, 360MusicWorX	
18	Phony Ppl	Euphonyus	300 Entertainment	
18	Senidah	Za Tebe	Bassivity Digital	Debuted at No. 53 on the Austrian Albums Chart
18	Various artists	Spirited (Soundtrack from the Apple Original Film)	Republic	
23	Paulo Londra	Back to the Game	Warner Latina	
25	Marker Starling	Diamond Violence	Tin Angel	
25	Stormzy	This Is What I Mean	0207 Def Jam	Debuted at No. 1 on the UK Albums Chart

=== December ===
Day	Artist(s)	Album	Record label(s)	Entering chart position
2	RM	Indigo	Big Hit	Debuted at No. 2 on the Circle Album Chart
6	Minho	Chase	SM, Dreamus	Debuted at No. 4 on the Circle Album Chart
9	A Boogie wit da Hoodie	Me vs. Myself	Atlantic, Highbridge	Debuted at No. 6 on the Billboard 200
9	SZA	SOS	Top Dawg, RCA	Debuted at No. 1 on the Billboard 200
10	Alicia Keys	Keys	RCA	Debuted at No. 41 on the Billboard 200
16	Jacquees	Sincerely For You	Cash Money, Republic	
16	Whitney Houston	I Wanna Dance with Somebody (The Movie: Whitney New, Classic and Reimagined)	RCA	Debuted at No. 83 on the ARIA Charts
24	Sugababes	The Lost Tapes	Self-released	Debuted at No. 23 on the Scottish Albums Chart
28	WayV	Phantom	Label V, SM, Dreamus	Debuted at No. 4 on the Oricon Charts
30	Vulfpeck	Schvitz	Vulf Records	
30	Waje	The Misfit	Continued Entertainment	

== Highest-charting songs ==
=== United States ===
R&B songs from any year which charted in the 2022 Top 40 of the Billboard Hot 100
Song	Artist	Project	Peak position
"About Damn Time"	Lizzo	Special	1
"Break My Soul"	Beyoncé	Renaissance	1
"Bad Habit"	Steve Lacy	Gemini Rights	1
"Lift Me Up"	Rihanna	Black Panther: Wakanda Forever	2
"Woman"	Doja Cat	Planet Her	7
"Falling Back"	Drake	Honestly, Nevermind	7
"Glimpse of Us"	Joji	Smithereens	8
"Nobody Gets Me"	SZA	SOS	10
"Shirt"	SZA	SOS	11
"Sacrifice"	The Weeknd	Dawn FM	11
"Blind"	SZA	SOS	12
"Texts Go Green"	Drake	Honestly, Nevermind	13
"Hrs and Hrs"	Muni Long	Public Displays of Affection	16
"Low"	SZA	SOS	17
"Alien Superstar"	Beyoncé	Renaissance	19
"Love Language"	SZA	SOS	21
"A Keeper"	Drake	Honestly, Nevermind	21
"Church Girl"	Beyoncé	Renaissance	22
"Seek & Destroy"	SZA	SOS	24
"I'm That Girl"	Beyoncé	Renaissance	26
"Energy"	Beyoncé featuring Beam	Renaissance	27
"Flight's Booked"	Drake	Honestly, Nevermind	28
"Gasoline"	The Weeknd	Dawn FM	29
"Cozy"	Beyoncé	Renaissance	30
"Used"	SZA featuring Don Toliver	SOS	30
"Out of Time"	The Weeknd	Dawn FM	31
"Is There Someone Else?"	The Weeknd	Dawn FM	32
"SOS"	SZA	SOS	32
"Special"	SZA	SOS	37
"How Do I Make You Love Me?"	The Weeknd	Dawn FM	39
"Ghost in the Machine"	SZA featuring Phoebe Bridgers	SOS	40

=== United Kingdom ===
R&B songs from any year which charted in the 2022 Top 10 of the UK Singles Chart
Song	Artist	Project	Peak position
"Go"	Cat Burns	Emotionally Unavailable	2

== Highest first-week consumption ==
List of albums with the highest first-week consumption (sales + streaming + track equivalent), as of December 2022 in the United States
Number	Album	Artist	1st-week consumption	1st-week position	Refs
1	Renaissance	Beyoncé	332,000	1	
2	SOS	SZA	318,000	1	
3	Dawn FM	The Weeknd	148,000	2	
4	Beautiful Mind	Rod Wave	115,000	1	
5	Wasteland	Brent Faiyaz	88,000	2	
6	Breezy	Chris Brown	72,000	4	
7	Special	Lizzo	69,000	2	
8	Smithereens	Joji	57,000	5	
9	Me vs. Myself	A Boogie wit da Hoodie	53,000	6	
10	Gemini Rights	Steve Lacy	34,000	7	

== All critically reviewed albums ranked ==
=== Metacritic ===
Number	Artist	Album	Average score	Number of reviews	Reference
1	Various artists	Summer of Soul (...Or, When the Revolution Could Not Be Televised) [Original Motion Picture Soundtrack]	94	4 reviews	
2	Beyoncé	Renaissance	91	26 reviews	
3	SZA	SOS	90	20 reviews	
4	Sudan Archives	Natural Brown Prom Queen	89	17 reviews	
5	Gabriels	Angels & Queens – Part I	88	5 reviews	
6	The Weeknd	Dawn FM	88	24 reviews	
7	Brian Jackson	This Is Brian Jackson	85	4 reviews	
8	Ari Lennox	Age/Sex/Location	84	5 reviews	
9	Eric Gales	Crown	84	4 reviews	
10	Son Little	Like Neptune	84	5 reviews	
11	The Brother Moves On	$/He Who Feeds You...Owns You	84	4 reviews	
12	Thee Sacred Souls	Thee Sacred Souls	84	4 reviews	
13	Kehlani	Blue Water Road	83	11 reviews	
14	Levon Helm & Mavis Staples	Carry Me Home	83	8 reviews	
15	Moor Mother	Jazz Codes	83	5 reviews	
16	Syd	Broken Hearts Club	82	10 reviews	
17	Steve Lacy	Gemini Rights	80	9 reviews	
18	Tank and the Bangas	Red Balloon	80	4 reviews	
19	Tedeschi Trucks Band	I Am the Moon: I. Crescent	80	4 reviews	
20	Raveena	Asha's Awakening	81	4 reviews	
21	Ben Marc	Glass Effect	79	5 reviews	
22	Khruangbin & Leon Bridges	Texas Moon	79	7 reviews	
23	Monophonics & Kelly Finnigan	Sage Motel	79	5 reviews	
24	Dr. John	Things Happen That Way	78	5 reviews	
25	Boulevards	Electric Cowboy: Born in Carolina Mud	77	4 reviews	
26	Sault	Air	77	6 reviews	
27	Amber Mark	Three Dimensions Deep	76	7 reviews	
28	NNAMDÏ	Please Have a Seat	76	4 reviews	
29	Lee Fields	Sentimental Fool	75	4 reviews	
30	Mary J. Blige	Good Morning Gorgeous	75	7 reviews	
31	Robert Glasper	Black Radio III	75	4 reviews	
32	Ella Mai	Heart on My Sleeve	74	6 reviews	
33	Mount Kimbie	MK 3.5: Die Cuts | City Planning	74	7 reviews	
34	Brent Faiyaz	Wasteland	73	5 reviews	
35	Giveon	Give or Take	72	6 reviews	
36	Nick Hakim	Cometa	69	5 reviews	
37	St. Paul and The Broken Bones	The Alien Coast	68	7 reviews	
38	Mura Masa	Demon Time	66	8 reviews	
39	John Legend	Legend	66	4 reviews	

== See also ==
- Previous article: 2021 in rhythm and blues
- Next article: 2023 in rhythm and blues
