= Thee Sacred Souls (album) =

Studio album by Thee Sacred Souls
- Released: August 26, 2022
- Recorded: 2019–2022
- Genre: Soul; R&B; funk
- Length: 38:43
- Label: Daptone

Thee Sacred Souls chronology
Thee Sacred Souls (2022)	Got a Story to Tell (2024)

Singles from Thee Sacred Souls
- 1. "Can I Call You Rose?" Released: March 18, 2020; 2. "Easier Said Than Done" Released: June 15, 2022

Thee Sacred Souls is the debut studio album by American soul trio Thee Sacred Souls, released on August 26, 2022, through Daptone Records.

== Development and release ==
Thee Sacred Souls formed in April 2019, composed of bassist Sal Samano, drummer Alex Garcia, and singer Josh Lane. Garcia and Samano met in San Diego in 2018, forming an instrumental oldies band. They met Lane a few months later, and he joined as a vocalist for the group. The group was inspired by chicano soul, gospel, doo-wop, and oldies music. The album's debut single, "Can I Call You Rose?" was the first song created by the trio. Work on their debut self-titled album began in 2019 and finished in 2022.

On March 18, 2020, the group released their first single, "Can I Call You Rose?" On June 15, 2022, the group announced that their debut self-titled album would be releasing on August 27, 2022, alongside a music video for "Easier Said Than Done". The group headlined a tour in support of the album in 2022 and 2023. On November 30, 2022, the group performed "Easier Said Than Done" on Jimmy Kimmel Live!

== Critical reception ==
Professional ratings
Aggregate scores
Source	Rating
Metacritic	84/100
Review scores
Source	Rating
Clash	8/10
God Is in the TV	6/10
Mojo	4/5 stars
Uncut	8/10

According to the review aggregator Metacritic, Thee Sacred Souls received "universal acclaim" based on a weighted average score of 84 out of 100 from 4 critic scores.

Mark Bentley's review for Uncut described the album as "barrel-aged deep soul, laced with Latin, lyrically inventive, and peculiarly fresh." Robin Murray of Clash wrote that the album's "down tempo sweet soul feels transported from the heavens, a soothing, harmony-laden blast of soulful magic." Writing for Mojo, Lois Wilson stated that the album's songs "are broad in scope and full of individual flourishes". Rocio Contreras of KCRW described the album as "a sonic love letter draped in beautiful harmonies, pulling from sacred memories to create something fresh, new, and full of flavor." Phil The Tremolo King of God Is in the TV wrote that the album was a "perfect re-creation of classic doo-wop soul" but that it lacked adventurousness.

=== Accolades ===
Publication	Accolade	Rank	Ref.
KCRW	The 22 Best Albums of 2022	10	

== Track listing ==
All tracks written by Alejandro García and Josh Lane and produced by Bosco Mann, except where noted.

Thee Sacred Souls track listing
No.	Title	Writer(s)	Length
1.	"Can I Call You Rose?"	Alejandro García; Josh Lane; Salvador Samano	3:10
2.	"Lady Love"	García; Lane	3:02
3.	"Easier Said Than Done"	García; Lane	2:54
4.	"Overflowing"	García; Lane	2:26
5.	"Trade of Hearts"	García; Lane	2:54
6.	"Weak for Your Love"	García; Lane; Samano	5:21
7.	"Future Lover"	García; Jensine Benitez; Lane; Riley Dunn; Samano; Shay Stulz	3:31
8.	"Sorrow for Tomorrow"	García; Lane; Samano	2:49
9.	"For Now"	García; Lane	3:53
10.	"Once You Know (Then You'll Know)"	García; Lane; Samano	3:02
11.	"Happy and Well"	García; Lane; Samano; Benitez	3:23
12.	"Love Comes Easy"	García; Lane	3:12
Total length:			38:43
