= This Silence Kills =

Studio album by Dillon
- Released: November 21, 2011
- Genres: Indie pop; electronic; art pop
- Length: 42:53
- Label: BPitch Control
- Producers: Dillon; Tamer Fahri Özgönenc; Thies Mynther

Dillon chronology
This Silence Kills (2011)	The Unknown (2014)

This Silence Kills is the debut studio album by Germany-based Brazilian singer-songwriter Dillon, released on November 21, 2011 on BPitch Control. The album received positive reviews from music critics.

== Style ==
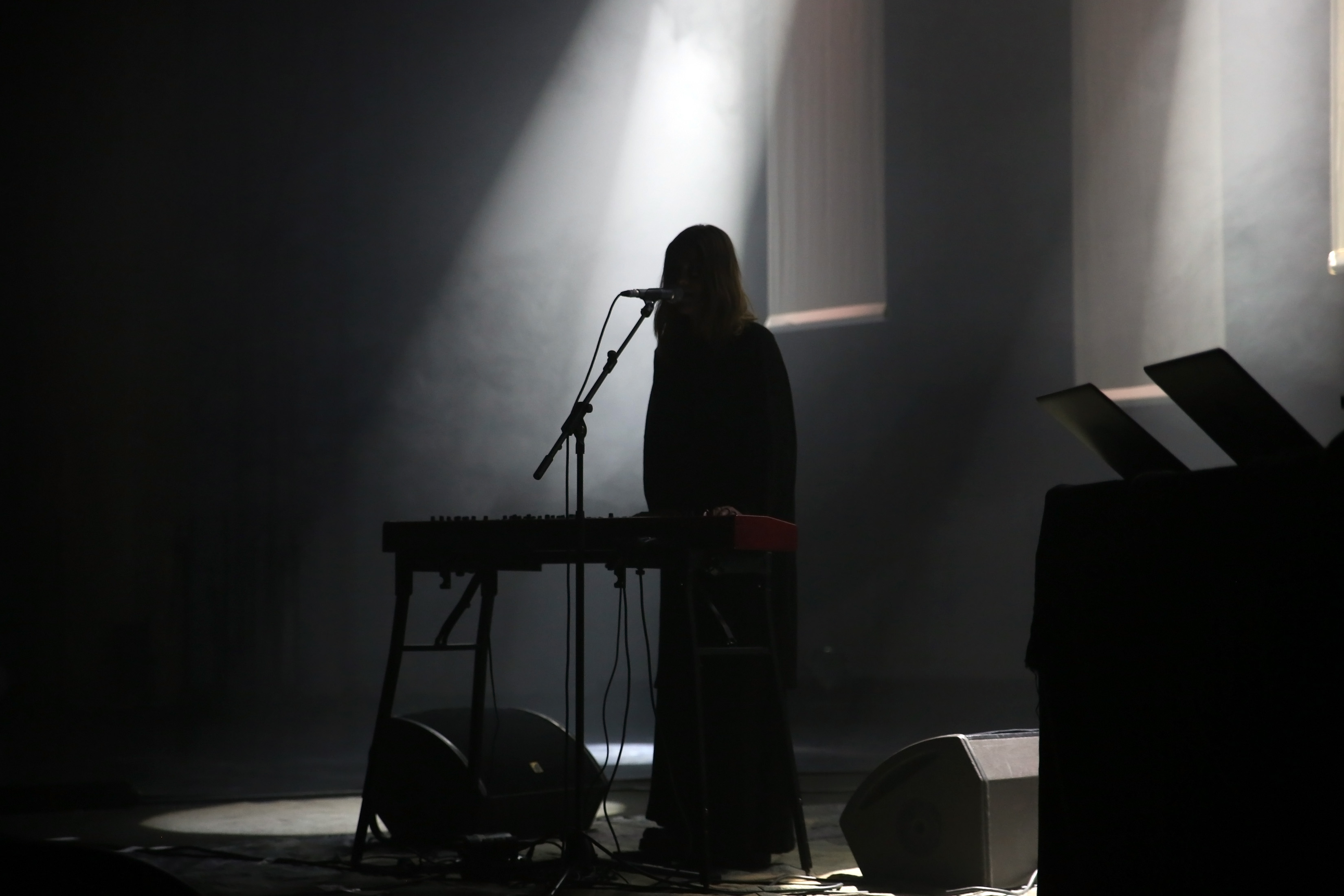
Dillon live at Waves Vienna in 2012

German music magazine Musikexpress called the album "chanson-pop" and noted influences from electronic music. Dillon's vocals on the album have been compared to those of Björk.

== Critical reception ==
Professional ratings
Aggregate scores
Source	Rating
Metacritic	72/100
Review scores
Source	Rating
AllMusic	4/5 stars
BBC Music	(favorable)
Mixmag	4/5 stars
Resident Advisor	3.5/5 stars
Uncut	3/5 stars

This Silence Kills received largely positive reviews from contemporary music critics. At Metacritic, which assigns a normalized rating out of 100 to reviews from mainstream critics, the album received an average score of 72, based on 5 reviews, which indicates "generally favorable reviews".

Markus Schneider of the Berliner Zeitung praised the album. Schneider noted that Dillon's electronic music distinguished her from many other songwriters, "who merely include electronic music as decorations." In a review for the BBC, Mike Diver lauded the album, saying, "Dillon uses spare beats, subtle orchestrations and background-mixed brass, but everything is bound by a vocal that speaks to the soul, not the soles."

== Track listing ==
All tracks are written by Dominique Dillon de Byington, except for "Thirteen Thirtyfive" (Jens Lekman).

No.	Title	Length
1.	"This Silence Kills"	4:18
2.	"Tip Tapping"	3:06
3.	"Thirteen Thirtyfive"	3:43
4.	"Your Flesh against Mine"	4:29
5.	"You Are My Winter"	4:21
6.	"Undying Need to Scream"	2:16
7.	"_________________"	4:53
8.	"From One to Six Hundred Kilometers"	3:39
9.	"Hey Beau"	2:35
10.	"Texture of My Blood"	2:33
11.	"Gumache"	2:56
12.	"Abrupt Clarity"	4:04
Total length:		42:53
