= Remember Me: The Mahalia Jackson Story (soundtrack) =

Remember Me: The Mahalia Jackson Story—Original Motion Picture Soundtrack

Soundtrack album by Ledisi / various artists
- Released: November 18, 2022
- Recorded: 2022
- Genre: gospel; spiritual
- Length: 59:58
- Label: ENME, 360MusicWorX

Remember Me: The Mahalia Jackson Story—Original Motion Picture Soundtrack is the soundtrack album accompanying the 2022 biographical musical drama film of the same name directed by Denise Dowse. The soundtrack was released on November 18, 2022, through Paul Wright III's 360MusicWorX label (distributed by The Orchard) and Ericka Nicole Malone's entertainment company ENME, both of whom also serve executive producers for the film.

== Background ==
Paul Wright III and Melvin "Maestro" Lightford served as producers and arrangers for the film's score, and the songs were produced by Ledisi, Wright and Rex Rideout. During production, Malone was unable to license any songs from Mahalia Jackson's personal catalog of music. Gospel songs and spirituals that were covered by Jackson were used for the soundtrack. An original song titled "Faith to Carry Me", written by Percy Bady and produced by Bady and Wright, was performed by Ledisi, BeBe Winans, and Donald Lawrence was also featured on the soundtrack.

== Critical reception ==
The soundtrack was considered for a Grammy Award in the category of Best Compilation Soundtrack for Visual Media but did not make the final ballot at 66th Annual Grammy Awards. "How I Got Over" and "Faith to Carry Me" were also considered for Grammy Award nominations in the category Best Gospel Performance/Song but also did not make the final ballot, respectively. The soundtrack won "Best Original Score" at the I Will Tell International Film Festival in 2022. The soundtrack was also nominated for Best Soundtrack at the British Urban Film Festival in 2022, and Outstanding Original Soundtrack at the Black Reel Awards in 2023.

== Track listing ==
No.	Title	Performer(s)	Length
1.	"Colored Entrance"	Paul Wright III; Melvin "Maestro" Lightford	0:39
2.	"I've Been Buked"	Ledisi	2:42
3.	"Jesus Loves Me"	Ava Elise Cherry	0:45
4.	"Charity's Dream"	Paul Wright III; Melvin "Maestro" Lightford	1:53
5.	"Death of Charity"	Paul Wright III; Melvin "Maestro" Lightford	1:53
6.	"Aunt's Duke"	Paul Wright III; Melvin "Maestro" Lightford	2:12
7.	"New Orleans Boogie"	Paul Wright III; Melvin "Maestro" Lightford	1:56
8.	"Aunt Duke vs Hannah"	Paul Wright III; Melvin "Maestro" Lightford	1:41
9.	"Welcome Home"	Jai'Len Josey	2:06
10.	"Amazing Grace"	Sha'leah Nikole	2:36
11.	"Great is Thy Faithfulness"	Ledisi	2:39
12.	"Duke's Theme"	Paul Wright III; Melvin "Maestro" Lightford	2:20
13.	"La Di Da"	Corbin Bleu	2:59
14.	"Daybreak (Ed Sullivan)"	Melvin "Maestro" Lightford	1:40
15.	"Get Away Jordan"	Ledisi	2:38
16.	"Emma's Cafe"	Paul Wright III; Melvin "Maestro" Lightford	1:18
17.	"Elijah Rock"	Ledisi	2:27
18.	"Blessed Quietness"	Ledisi	0:34
19.	"Blessed Quietness (Instrumental)"	Paul Wright III; Melvin "Maestro" Lightford	0:48
20.	"Remember the Movement"	Paul Wright III; Melvin "Maestro" Lightford	2:14
21.	"Joshua Fit the Battle of Jericho"	Ledisi	2:03
22.	"Preach Martin"	Paul Wright III; Melvin "Maestro" Lightford	1:11
23.	"How I Got Over"	Ledisi	3:38
24.	"Two-Time Sigmond"	Paul Wright III; Melvin "Maestro" Lightford	2:42
25.	"I Must Tell Jesus"	Ledisi	2:15
26.	"Trouble of this World"	Ledisi	5:08
27.	"Faith to Carry Me"	Ledisi; BeBe Winans; Donald Lawrence & Co.	5:02
Total length:			59:58

== Awards and nominations ==
Year	Award show	Category	Nominated work	Result	Ref
2023	Black Reel Awards	Outstanding Original Soundtrack		Nominated	
