= Remember Me: The Mahalia Jackson Story =

- Theatrical release poster
- Directed by: Denise Dowse
- Written by: Ericka Nicole Malone
- Produced by: Vince Allen; Reshaun Frear
- Starring: Ledisi; Columbus Short; Wendy Raquel Robinson; Janet Hubert; Vanessa Williams; Corbin Bleu; Keith David
- Cinematography: Eduardo Ramirez-Gonzalez
- Edited by: Brian Pratt; Dina McCrary
- Music by: Paul Wright III (also Music Supervisor); Melvin "Maestro" Lightford; Ledisi; Rex Rideout
- Production companies: Ericka Nicole Malone Entertainment; Re'Shaun Frear Productions; 360MusicWorX
- Distributed by: Hulu
- Release date: September 20, 2022
- Running time: 82 minutes
- Country: United States
- Language: English

Remember Me: The Mahalia Jackson Story is an American biographical musical drama film directed by Denise Dowse (in her directing debut as well as her only directing credit before her death in August 2022) and written by Ericka Nicole Malone. The film stars Ledisi as gospel singer and activist Mahalia Jackson. Also starring Columbus Short, Wendy Raquel Robinson, Janet Hubert, Vanessa Williams, Corbin Bleu and Keith David. It premiered at the 2022 Pan African Film & Arts Festival in Los Angeles in April 2022. The film later premiered on Hulu on September 20, 2022.

The film received three NAACP Image Awards nomination at the 54th NAACP Image Awards: for Outstanding Independent Motion Picture, Outstanding Breakthrough Performance in a Motion Picture (Ledisi), and won Outstanding Breakthrough Creative (Motion Picture) (Ericka Nicole Malone).

== Cast ==
- Ledisi as Mahalia Jackson
- Columbus Short as Martin Luther King Jr.
- Wendy Raquel Robinson as Cylestine
- Janet Hubert as Aunt Mahala "Duke" Paul
- Jai'len Josey as Aunt Hannah
- Carl Gilliard as John Jackson
- LaTonya Black Gilliard as Charity Jackson
- Vanessa Williams as Lucille
- Corbin Bleu as Cab Calloway
- Keith David as Ink Williams
- Keith Robinson as Thomas A. Dorsey
- Richard Whiten as Sigmond Galloway
- Andrew Lauer as Alexander Hardwick
- Krystal McMullan as Geraldine
- Saisha Teagues as Evelyn
- Duane Avery as Ralph Abernathy
- Chester Gregory as Duke Ellington
- Jeff Prater as Ed Sullivan
- Sha'leah Nikole as Mahalila Jackson (young)
- Ava Elise Cherry as Mahalia Jackson (little)

== Production ==
=== Development ===
On January 9, 2021, Deadline Hollywood reported that Ericka Nicole Malone had written a script about Mahalia Jackson. The online new site also announced that respected actress Denise Dowse had signed on to direct the film for Ericka Nicole Malone Entertainment. Malone also served as executive producer along with Phillip E. Robinson. Vince Allen and Reshaun Frear came on board as producers along with Frear's production company Re'Shaun Frear Productions.

Troy "Big Riff" Taylor and Tracey Baumert signed on as first assistant directors, and Chris Jackson, Curtis Case, Allie Tolman, Nikki Hoard, and Chris Wayne were second assistant directors for scenes that needed to be reshoot.

=== Casting ===
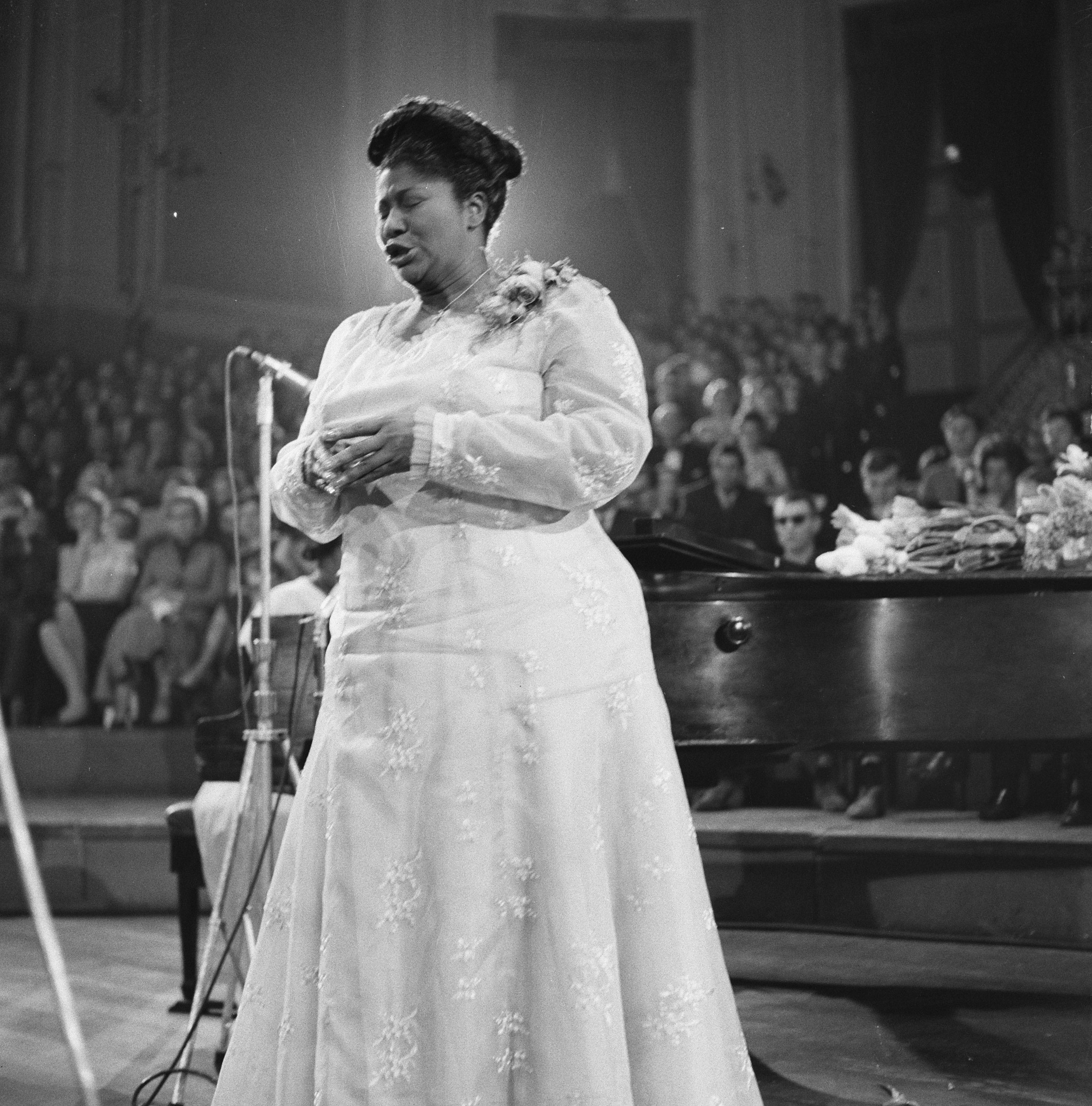
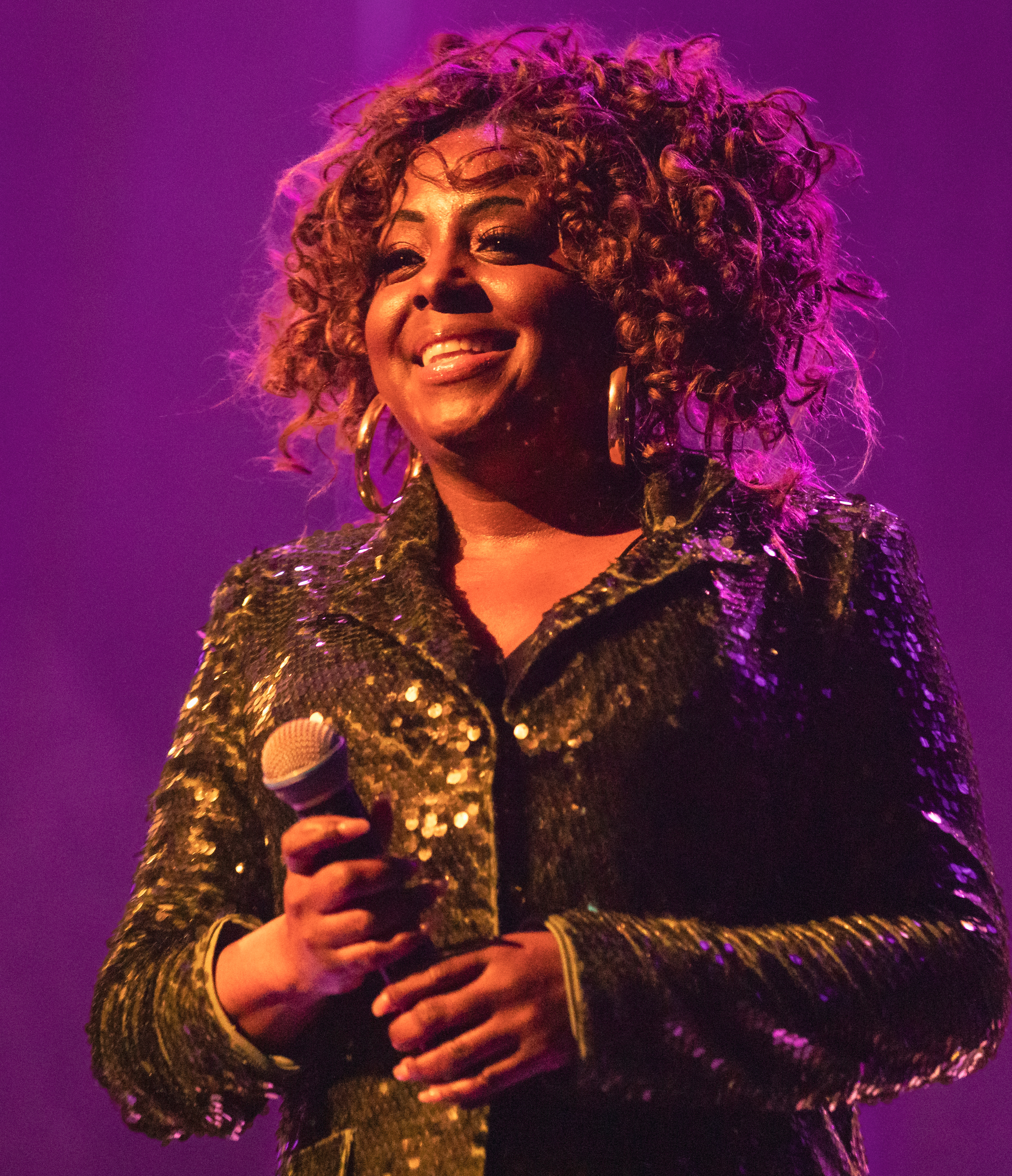
Mahalia Jackson (left) was portrayed by Ledisi (right).

Casting decisions were made by Phaedra Harris. On January 9, 2021, Deadline Hollywood announced that Ledisi, Columbus Short, Janet Hubert, and Wendy Raquel Robinson were cast in the film. In the same article, Deadline Hollywood announced Ledisi had been cast as the lead role Mahalia Jackson, a role she reprises from the historical drama film Selma (2014). Short was also announced to be cast as Martin Luther King Jr.

Ledisi originally declined the offer to reprise the role but ultimately accepted the role. In preparation for the role, Ledisi was required to gain at least forty pounds. She also further studied Jackson's singing, personality, and her relationship with Martin Luther King Jr. Ledisi stated, "I hung out with a few pastors to understand the purpose of 'Jericho' and studied the Bible a little more. Preparation was really going into deep study of the spiritual work because she was anointed. She could have easily done R&B and other styles of music. And she loved Bessie Smith. Her phrasing was like jazz music, the way she sang. I really studied her technique, and it was very hard to figure out all of that."

Columbus Short commented "It's truly a great honor to portray a man that has made such an indelible impact on society and to all of ours lives."

=== Music ===
Paul Wright III and Melvin "Maestro" Lightford composed the score for the film. Paul Wright III also served as Music Supervisor. Production was unable to license any songs from Jackson's personal catalog of music. Songs that were covered by Jackson were used for the soundtrack. The soundtrack album The Mahalia Jackson Story: Original Motion Picture Soundtrack was produced by Ledisi, Paul Wright III, Rex Rideout, and Melvin "Maestro" Lightford, and released on November 18, 2022. "Faith to Carry Me", performed by Ledisi, BeBe Winans, and Donald Lawrence, was released as a single. Promotional music videos for the songs "Welcome Home", "La Di Da", "Joshua Fit the Battle of Jericho", "I've Been Buked", "I Must Tell Jesus", "How I Got Over", "Great Is Thy Faithfulness", "Get Away Jordan", and "Amazing Grace" were released to YouTube.

== Release ==
Remember Me: The Mahalia Jackson Story premiered at the 2022 Pan African Film & Arts Festival in Los Angeles on April 19, 2022. In late September 2022, the production team closed a multi-year licensing deal with Hulu and Multicom Entertainment Group in conjunction with Simon Barnes and Mili Cumic's Locomotive Entertainment. In the same month, the film aired on American subscription streaming media network Hulu. The film was released to home video on December 7, 2022.

== Accolades ==
Ceremony	Year	Category	Recipient	Result	Ref
Africa Movie Academy Awards	2022	Best Diaspora Narrative Feature		Won	
Black Reel Awards	2023	Outstanding Original Soundtrack		Nominated	
Dove Awards	2023	Feature Film of the Year		Nominated	
NAACP Image Awards	2023	Outstanding Breakthrough Creative	Ericka Nicole Malone	Won	
NAACP Image Awards	2023	Outstanding Breakthrough Performance in a Motion Picture	Ledisi	Nominated	
NAACP Image Awards	2023	Outstanding Independent Motion Picture		Nominated	

== See also ==
- Robin Roberts Presents: Mahalia (2021) — another biographical musical drama film about Mahalia Jackson
