= Three Dimensions Deep =

Debut studio album by Amber Mark

Studio album by Amber Mark
- Released: January 28, 2022
- Length: 60:06
- Labels: PMR; EMI; Interscope
- Producers: Amber Mark; Pase Rock; DJ Ross One; Julian Bunetta; Jeff "Gitty" Gitelman; Afterhrs; Space People; Two Fresh; Matt Zara; Duck Blackwell; Paul Mond

Amber Mark chronology
Conexão (2018)	Three Dimensions Deep (2022)	Loosies (2024)

Singles from Three Dimensions Deep
- 1. "Worth It" Released: April 23, 2021; 2. "Competition" Released: June 9, 2021; 3. "Foreign Things" Released: August 23, 2021; 4. "What It Is" Released: September 24, 2021; 5. "Softly" Released: November 12, 2021

Three Dimensions Deep is the debut studio album by American singer, songwriter, and producer Amber Mark. It was released on January 28, 2022, through PMR and EMI Records. The album was preceded by five singles: "Worth It", "Competition", "Foreign Things", "What It Is", and "Softly".

== Critical reception ==
Three Dimensions Deep
Aggregate scores
Source	Rating
AnyDecentMusic?	7.6/10
Metacritic	76/100
Review scores
Source	Rating
Pitchfork	8.0/10
Rolling Stone	3/5 stars
Paste	7.2/10
musicOMH	4/5 stars
DIY	3.5/5 stars
The Line of Best Fit	8/10
Loud and Quiet	6/10

Three Dimensions Deep received generally positive reviews from music critics, receiving a 76 out of 100 on the review aggregate website Metacritic based on 7 reviews, indicating "generally favorable reviews". NPR Music described the album as Mark's attempt to work through "feelings of uncertainty" and experiences with loss. Pitchfork noted that "[m]oving smoothly between R&B, funk, and pop, the fully realized album foregrounds Mark’s vocals and songwriting" while bringing in sci-fi themes and "celestial metaphors". Rolling Stone was more mixed in its review, saying that the album was "short-circuited by hamfisted writing, especially as the album’s space theme gets less playful and more literal."

== Track listing ==
Three Dimensions Deep track listing
No.	Title	Writer(s)	Producer(s)	Length
1.	"One"	Amber Mark; Deadric Malone; Patrick Johnson; Ross D Schwartzman	Pase Rock; DJ Ross One; Mark; Julian Bunetta	3:31
2.	"What It Is"	Mark; Bunetta	Bunetta	5:25
3.	"Most Men"	Mark	Mark; Bunetta	4:15
4.	"Healing Hurts"	Mark; Jeff "Gitty" Gitelman; Trey Campbell	Gitelman	2:42
5.	"Bubbles"	Mark; Andrew Haas; Ian Franzino; Steph Jones; Bunetta; John Ryan	Afterhrs; Bunetta	2:38
6.	"Softly"	Mark; Craig David; Mark Hill; Bunetta	Mark; Bunetta	2:54
7.	"FOMO"	Mark; Space People	Space People	3:52
8.	"Turnin' Pages"	Mark; Ryan; Liza Owen	Ryan	2:36
9.	"Foreign Things"	Mark; Kendrick Nicholls; Sherwyn Nicholls; Haas; Franzino; Jason Kellner; Bunetta; Chase Hugh Worrell	Two Fresh; Afterhrs; Bunetta	3:00
10.	"On & On"	Mark	Mark; Bunetta	3:28
11.	"Out Of This World"	Mark; Harris Cole	Mark; Bunetta	3:13
12.	"Cosmic"	Mark; Bunetta	Mark; Bunetta	4:35
13.	"Darkside"	Mark	Mark; Matt Zara; Duck Blackwell; Bunetta	3:32
14.	"Worth It"	Mark	Mark; Bunetta; Paul Mond	4:19
15.	"Competition"	Mark; Bunetta; K. Nicholls; S. Nicholls; Haas; Franzino; Owen; Jones	Two Fresh; Afterhrs; Bunetta	3:22
16.	"Bliss"	Mark; Bunetta; K. Nicholls; S. Nicholls; Haas; Franzino; Owen; Jones	Two Fresh; Afterhrs; Bunetta	2:54
17.	"Event Horizon"	Mark	Mark	3:57
Total length:				60:06
