= Amber Mark =

American singer-songwriter (born 1993)

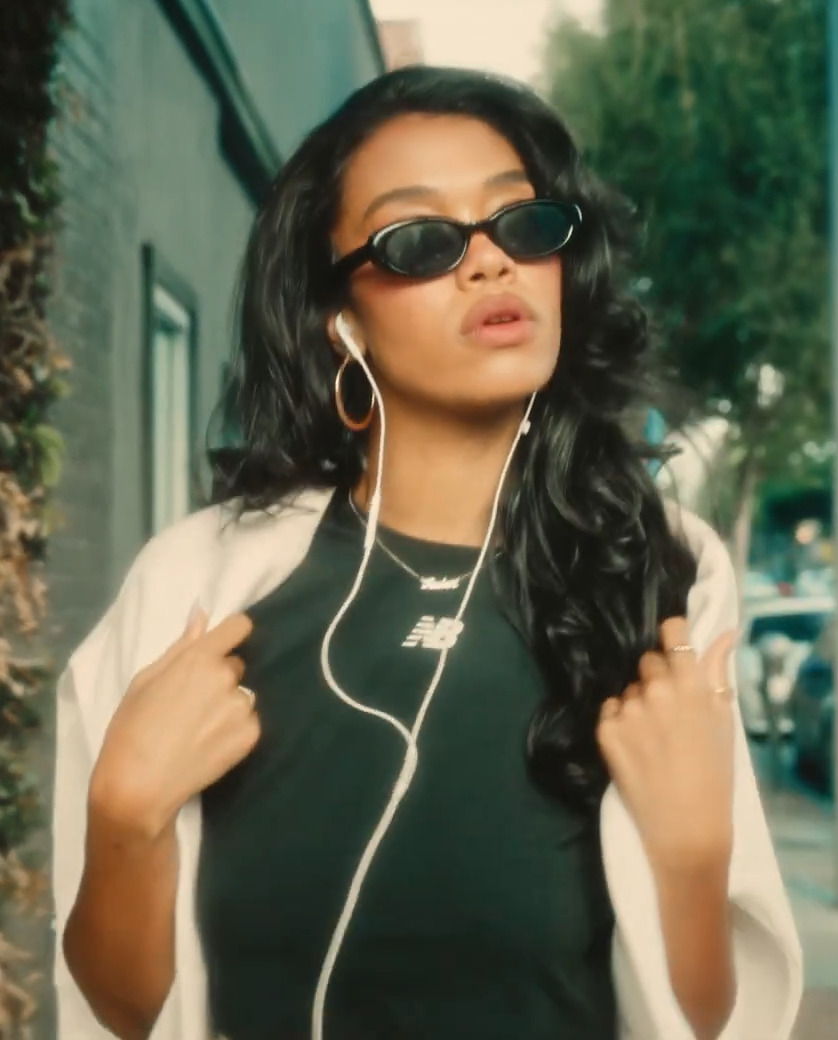
- Mark in 2025
- Born: December 29, 1993 (age 32); Summertown, Tennessee, U.S.
- Occupations: Singer; songwriter
- Years active: 2016–present
- Musical career
- Genres: Contemporary R&B; alternative R&B; indie soul
- Instruments: Vocals; drums; keyboards; guitar; bass guitar
- Labels: PMR; EMI; Interscope
- Website: ambermarkmusic.com

Amber Mark (born December 29, 1993) is an American singer, songwriter, and producer. Her multifaceted style implements sounds from hip hop, contemporary R&B, soul, and bossa nova. She released her first EP, 3:33am, in May 2017, followed by her EP Conexão in 2018. Her debut album, Three Dimensions Deep, was released in January 2022. Pretty Idea followed as her sophomore album in October 2025.

Mark was also a featured artist on Chromeo's Head over Heels (2018), which was nominated for Best Engineered Album, Non-Classical at the 61st Annual Grammy Awards.

== Early life ==
Mark was born on December 29, 1993, on a farm in Summertown, Tennessee, to a Jamaican father and a German mother from Kaiserslautern, whose name was Mia Mark. Her mother was a painter and her biological father is a musician. She has an older half-brother with whom she shares the same mom. She and her mother lived in Miami, New York, and Munich eventually moving to a monastery in Darjeeling so that her mother could learn Tibetan Buddhist thangka painting. After spending a few years there, they returned to Germany, settling in the Pankow borough of Berlin. While in Berlin, Mark taught herself how to play guitar. Mark and her mother eventually moved back to New York City, where her godparents legally adopted her so that she could attend Talent Unlimited High School in Manhattan.

Mark and her mother later moved to Miami where her brother lived. Mark attended Miami Beach Senior High. She joined the high school choir and an after-school rock ensemble. After high school, she moved back to New York City where she interned at Roc Nation. In her late teens, Mark’s mother died of breast cancer.

== Career ==
Mark released her debut single "Space" to her SoundCloud in 2016. In 2017 she released her first album, 3:33am. She explained, "[t]hree has been a really common number in my life. My mother was born in 1953, my brother was born in 1983 and I was born in 1993. Then my mum passed away on June 3, at 10:23pm in 2013. Since then, I'd see threes everywhere. When I was writing the EP in New York... and out of the zone, I would check the clock and I always remember it being 3:33am." The album art features a photo taken by her sister, in which Mark is wearing a watch that reads 3:33.

Each song on the record represents one of the six stages of grief around the death of her mother. The song "Monsoon" includes samples of her mother's voice. In 2018, she released the EP Conexão that included the single "Love Me Right".

On October 2025, JD Sports and New Balance teamed up with Mark, along with rapper AZ Chike, for an exclusive limited edition sneakers release and campaign. From October 23rd to November 23rd, 2025, she performed as an opening act for Sabrina Carpenter on her Short n' Sweet Tour.

She is featured in the single "How to Pray" along with Kendrick Lamar, from record producer and musician Dahi's debut studio album Black Boy (Alternative), released on 28 August 2026.

== Discography ==
=== Albums ===
Title	Details
Three Dimensions Deep	Released: January 28, 2022; Label: PMR, EMI, Interscope; Format: CD, LP, cassette, digital download
Pretty Idea	Released: October 10, 2025; Label: PMR, EMI, Interscope; Format: CD, LP, digital download

=== Extended plays (EPs) ===
Title	Details
3:33am	Released: May 12, 2017; Label: PMR, Virgin EMI; Format: Digital download
Conexão	Released: May 3, 2018; Label: Virgin EMI; Format: Streaming, digital download
Loosies	Released: November 22, 2024; Label: Interscope; Format: Streaming, digital download

=== Singles ===
==== As lead artist ====
Title	Year	Peak chart positions			Certifications	Album/EP
Title	Year	IRE	JPN Over.	UK	Certifications	Album/EP
"Space"	2016	―	―	―		3:33am
"Monsoon" (featuring Mia Mark)	2016	―	―	―		3:33am
"Way Back"	2016	―	―	―		3:33am
"Lose My Cool"	2017	―	―	―	BPI: Silver	3:33am
"Can You Hear Me?"	2017	―	―	―		3:33am
"Heatwave"	2018	―	―	―		Non-album single
"Love Me Right"	2018	―	―	―		Conexão
"Put You On" (featuring DRAM)	2018	―	―	―		Non-album singles
"High on Your Love"	2018	―	―	―		Non-album singles
"Mixer"	2019	―	―	―		Non-album singles
"What If"	2019	―	―	―		Non-album singles
"Generous"	2020	―	―	―		Non-album singles
"Heart Shaped Box"	2020	―	―	―		1894
"Waiting"	2020	―	―	―		1894
"1894"	2020	―	―	―		1894
"My People"	2020	―	―	―		Non-album singles
"Thong Song"	2020	―	―	―		Non-album singles
"I Guess the Lord Must Be in New York City"	2020	―	―	―		Non-album singles
"Heat" (with Paul Woolford)	2021	99	―	61	BPI: Silver	Non-album singles
"Worth It"	2021	―	―	―		Three Dimensions Deep
"Competition"	2021	―	―	―		Three Dimensions Deep
"Foreign Things"	2021	―	―	―		Three Dimensions Deep
"What It Is"	2021	―	―	―		Three Dimensions Deep
"Softly"	2021	―	―	―		Three Dimensions Deep
"Comin' Around Again"	2024	―	―	―		Non-album singles
"Space & Time"	2024	―	―	―		Non-album singles
"Lovely Day"	2024	―	―	―		Non-album singles
"Won't Cry"	2024	―	―	―		Loosies
"Sink In"	2024	―	―	―		Loosies
"Sweet Serotonin"	2025	―	―	―		Pretty Idea
"Let Me Love You"	2025	―	17	―		Pretty Idea
"Too Much"	2025	―	―	―		Pretty Idea
"Don't Remind Me" (with Anderson .Paak)	2025	―	11	―		Pretty Idea
"—" denotes a recording that did not chart or was not released.

==== As featured artist ====
Title	Year	Album
"Trees On Fire" (DJDS featuring Amber Mark and Marco Mckinnis)	2017	Big Wave More Fire
"Like a Hunger" (Wilma Archer featuring Amber Mark)	2017	Non-album single
"Just Friends" (Chromeo featuring Amber Mark)	2018	Head over Heels
"I Feel Energy" (Dirty Projectors featuring Amber Mark)	2018	Lamp Lit Prose
"You've Got to Feel" (Empress Of featuring Amber Mark)	2020	Non-album single
"Out of Luck" (Tkay Maidza featuring Lolo Zouaï and Amber Mark)	2023	Sweet Justice
"How to Pray" (Dahi featuring Kendrick Lamar and Amber Mark)	2026	Black Boy (Alternative)

== Awards and nominations ==
Year	Awarding body	Category	Nominated work	Result
2019	Grammy Awards	Best Engineered Album, Non-Classical	Head over Heels	Nominated
2026	UK Music Video Awards	Best R&B / Soul / Jazz Video – International	Don't Remind Me (with Anderson .Paak)	Nominated
