= Ojerime =

- Born: Ojerime Smith; 1993 (age 32–33); Lewisham, London, England
- Genre: R&B
- Occupations: Singer; songwriter; producer
- Years active: 2015-present
- Website: ojerime.com

Ojerime (born 1993) is a British singer, songwriter, and producer from South London. Known for her 1990s R&B sound and atmospheric vocals and production, she has released five studio albums, the most recent being Bad Influence (2022).

== Early life ==
Ojerime was born to a Nigerian father and a Jamaican mother in Lewisham, an area of southeast London. Both her parents introduced her to music early, with her mother playing lovers rock and her father putting her onto Fela Kuti and reggae acts like Gyptian. Her first experiences with recording music came from posting re-fixes of popular songs to SoundCloud and as part of the London underground R&B scene.

== Musical career ==
In 2015, Ojerime released her first album Ojerime: The Silhouette, which was followed by 2016's fang2001. It was her 2018 album, 4U, that brought her wider recognition, with critics noting her use of sound concepts from 1990s R&B. Her 2020 album, B4 I Breakdown, was recorded following a six-week hospitalization due to stress. The album features songs that chart her journey through depression and self-recovery. Her 2022 album, Bad Influence, was punctuated by a 90s guitar-influenced nostalgic sound.

== Artistry ==
Ojerime is known for her 1990s R&B-inspired sounds and a layered, atmospheric musical vibe. Her songs are described as "blending sultry 90s influences with a raw, underground feel that is completely refreshing." Due to her underground music scene background, in her early years, she handled much of her production herself, noting a need for her songs to introduce themselves from the first note.

== Discography ==
=== Studio albums ===
- Ojerime: The Silhouette (2015)
- fang2001 (2016)
- 4U (2018)
- B4 I Breakdown (2020)
- Bad Influence (2022)
- Don’t Stare At The Flame (2026)
