= The Brother Moves On =

South African performance art ensemble

- Also known as: The Brother, TBMO, Ubhuti uyahamba
- Origin: Kempton Park, Johannesburg, Gauteng, South Africa
- Genres: Ninja gospel, maskandi rock
- Years active: 2009–present
- Label: Independent
- Members: Siyabonga Mthembu; Zelizwe Mthembu; Ayanda Zalekile; Simphiwe Tshabalala; Oscar Kgware; Itani Thalefi; Hlubi Vhakalise; Malcolm Jiyane; Nolan Oswald Dennis; Stuart Cairns
- Past members: Rob Scher; Raytheon Moorvan/ Raytheism; Nkululeko Mthembu; BJ Engelbrecht; Sibusiso Zwane

The Brother Moves On (TBMO) is a South African performance art ensemble based in Johannesburg, Gauteng. The group was founded some time between the years 2008 and 2010 by broad-based artist Nkululeko Mthembu and his brother Siyabonga Mthembu. Beginning as a loose art collective including graphic and performance artists, TBMO is most widely recognized as a band fronted by Siyabonga Mthembu as lead vocalist, with Zelizwe Mthembu on lead guitar, Ayanda Zalekile on bass and Simphiwe Tshabalala on drums. This core group is regularly joined by a shifting cohort of collaborators and members from various disciplines.

The Brother Moves On is known for their multi-disciplinary live shows described as "tradition-trouncing trans-Atlantic Afro-centric futuristically ancient fusion" in which core members and invited performers take on various roles combining storytelling, theatre, drawing, video installation and other experimental media. The current ensemble includes Siyabonga Mthembu, Zelizwe Mthembu, Ayanda Zalekile, Simphiwe Tshabalala, Mthunzi Mvubu (alto saxophone), Mohammed Dawjee (tenor saxophone). The band also regularly features a variety of musicians from the Johannesburg live music scene such as Itai Hakim from poetry duo Children of the Wind, Malcolm Jiyane from the Malcolm Jiyane Tree-Oh and Solethu Madasa from the Solethu Madasa quintet.

== History ==
=== Naming ===
The name The Brother Moves On derives from TBMO founders and brothers Siyabonga and Nkululeko Mthembu mishearing of Michael Potts's enforcer Brother Mouzone in the American television drama series The Wire.

=== Formation and beginning ===
Nkululeko, Siyabonga, and Zelizwe Mthembu grew up together in Kempton Park Tembisa in the East Rand of Johannesburg, South Africa. They started composing together from a young age and together began the formation of what would be known as The Brother Moves On. The Mthembu brothers began rehearsing with musicians from the Music Academy of Gauteng as Zelizwe Mthembu was enrolled in the school after having left the Moses Molelekwa School of Music in Thembisa. The Music Academy is run by trumpeter and music educator Dr. Johnny Mekoa. At this school the band would start relating to the idea of musicianship fusing with the visual art and performance. Visual artist and musician Malcolm Jiyane was pivotal in this relation as a senior and lecturer at the college. This period was the beginning of long-standing relations with Oscar Kgware (saxophone), Ayanda Zalekile (trombone and later bass guitar), and Jiyane. (trombone and piano). The lack of transportation and funds to continue this relation would necessitate a shift for the idea.

In early 2009, Nkululeko met Raytheon Moorvan and organized for a "band meeting" with his brother and cousin at his mother's house. This would be the first formal rehearsal of The Brother Moves On. Later that week the band was booked for a performance at Mam' Busi Mhlongo's memorial and the National Arts Festival in Makhanda, South Africa. This would herald the arrival of Simphiwe Tshabalala as the drummer of the band, and since then the Mthembu brothers, Simphiwe Tshabalala and Ayanda Zalekile have been the longest standing members of the outfit.

=== The Golden Wake (2009–2012) ===
The Golden Wake is the first musical offering from TBMO. The six-track unmastered EP was performed and recorded at the SABC media park for a live studio audience and tells a fictional tale of a young South African villager named Mr. Gold. The self-produced EP was re-released and mastered in 2015 with an additional three tracks and sees the movement from DIY band to art collective.

In the time leading up to the recording of The Golden Wake EP, TBMO had many shifts in their line up. For this particular performance/recording the line-up included Nkululeko Mthembu, Siyabonga Mthembu, Zelizwe Mthembu, Raytheon Moorvan, Simphiwe Tshabalala, and long time childhood friend of Simphiwe, Tito Sibusiso Zwana on bass guitar. A performance artist/dancer, Kyle De Boer, also featured on a track entitled "The Black Diamond Butterfly" (which incidentally is the name of the character he plays for the piece). Featuring performance artists would become a staple of the band, with Mmakgosi Kgabi, Nhlanhla Kubeka and BJ Engelbrecht featuring in the recording of A Golden Wake.

==== Basic conceptual outline ====
The Golden Wake as a performed piece is a staging of a funeral for the character of Mr Gold (played by Siyabonga Mthembu). Audience members are invited to the wake of this funeral and throughout the performance are introduced to other characters from Mr Gold's life.

The story of Mr. Gold begins with a dream that he has of his grandfather. In the dream he is told by his elder to journey to the city of Gold to "Mine his dreams". Much of the theme of The Golden Wake deals with the idea of Gold as a representation of value and interrogates this global idea of value as a charade.

=== E.T.A. (2012) ===
ETA - Expected Time of Arrival - TBMO's second EP - presents two radio singles as a preamble to the ETA tour and the recording of the debut album. ETA was produced by Paulo Chibanga, drummer of 340ml and director of the Azgo Festival (Maputo), and engineered by Gavan Eckhart.

Track 1, "Good Times", personalizes the miners' experience as a cathartic exercise in the wake of the Marikana miners' strike. Track 2, "Ya’khalimbazo", is an ode to the self-defence unit (SDU) that used to police Caleni "Kalambazo" section in Tembisa between 1990 and 1993.

=== A New Myth (2013) ===
In 2013, the band started the recording of their first full-length album. Titles including Duffel Bags Full of Dough, Game-Changing E-Minor and Fuck What You Heard and Zen or Die were thrown around before the band settled on A New Myth. A few weeks before the release of the album, Nkululeko Mthembu, one of the band's founding members died. The album was released on the morning prior to the death of South African elder and statesman Nelson Mandela, and the title would thus become prophetic in the country's need for "a new myth" with the death of the Mandela era of forgiveness and with the passing of the founder of the idea of a performance art space in Nkululeko Mthembu.

The album was released on 5 December 2013 to critical acclaim. In a review for South African music website PLATFORM, Kevin Minofu said: "The Brother Moves On is the most important band in the country" and gave the album a score of 90 out of 100. The album also came at number 5 on PLATFORM's list of the best albums of 2013. A song on the album "Hossanna" was voted into the Top 100 songs in South Africa since the advent of recorded music by the Sunday Times.

=== The Goodman Gallery (2015/6) ===
The band began a relationship with the Goodman Gallery as part of the Working Title exhibition curated by Emma Laurence. This would see the band cement a growing relationship with the gallery, having only exhibited as part of the Goethe Institutes Project Space in the Maboneng Precinct's experimentation space Art on Main. The exhibition at Art on Main entitled The Brother Breaks the Bullion would be followed by a performance at the Goodman Gallery as part of the prestigious Johannesburg Art Week entitled The Brother Burns the Bullion. These exhibitions would include the visual artist and visionary Nolan Oswald Dennis. Both Oswald Dennis and The Brother Moves On would go on to be represented by the Gallery, a first in the South African art and music scene. The Brother Moves On had their first solo exhibition at The Goodman in September 2016, a homage to Nkululeko Mthembu's collaborative spirit.

== Critical reception ==
In 2012, The Guardian described the band as "powerful and captivating" after hearing an Okayafrica compilation featuring the band.
