= Mai Mult De-O Viață =

EP by Smiley
- Released: 17 February 2022
- Recorded: 2021
- Genre: Dance-pop; soul
- Length: 15:05
- Label: Cat Music; HaHaHa Production
- Producer: Smiley

Smiley chronology
Confesiune (2017)	Mai Mult De-O Viață (2022)

Singles from Mai Mult De-O Viață
- 1. "Mai Mult De-O Viață" Released: February 17, 2022

Mai Mult De-O Viață (Romanian pronunciation: [maj ˈmult de̯o ˈvjatsə]; More than a life) is an EP by Romanian singer Smiley, released on February 17, 2022. The album peaked at number three in the Romania Top 20 charts with single "Purtat De Vânt", spending seven weeks in both top 10 and altogether in the Romanian charts. The single was also featured in the CIS top charts, making it to the 172nd place.

== Concept ==
In order to celebrate his own life, both from on stage and from the perspective of a normal person, Smiley created Mai Mult De-O Viață as a musical serial with five chapters in which he practically tells his story beginning with childhood and finishing with his adult years.

Each track of the album represents in fact an episode. After the first four episodes of the series, "Locul Sfințește Omul", "Nu Mai Există Dup-aia", "Purtat De Vânt" and "Mi-aduc Aminte" told the story of the happy childhood, the tumultuous adolescence, the road to success and of the passionate but betrayed love of three of his best friends, "Mai Mult De-O Viață" concludes and shows the face of mature love, crossed by time and drama, but also by passion and destiny. Smiley and wife Gina Pistol conclude the final chapter of the serial by expressing their love which made them a solid unit.

The first chapter of the album was represented by track "Locul Sfințește Omul" which was released on November 25, 2021.

The second chapter of the album was represented by track "Nu Mai Există Dup-aia" which was released on December 10, 2021.

Released episode by episode on Smiley's official YouTube channel, the musical series, composed of 5 episodes built as short films to connect musically and cinematographically the stages of an endless love story, has the script written by Iulian Moga, the direction bears the signature of Kobzzon, the music is composed, produced and recorded in the HaHaHa Production studios, and the project is a co-production of HaHaHa Production and Cat Music.

== Track listing ==
No.	Title	Writer(s)	Music	Length
1.	"Locul Sfințește Omul (The place holies the man)"	Smiley; Nosfe	Smiley; Nosfe; Lucian Nagy; Florin Boka; Roland Kiss	3:24
2.	"Nu Mai Există Dup-aia (There is no after)"	Smiley; Nosfe	Smiley; Nosfe; Lucian Nagy; Florin Boka; Roland Kiss	3:26
3.	"Purtat De Vânt (Carried by the wind)"	Smiley; Nosfe	Smiley; Nosfe; Lucian Nagy; Florin Boka; Roland Kiss	2:47
4.	"Mi-aduc Aminte (I remember)"	Smiley; Nosfe	Smiley; Nosfe; Lucian Nagy; Florin Boka; Roland Kiss	3:02
5.	"Mai Mult De-O Viață (More than a life)"	Smiley; Nosfe	Smiley; Nosfe; Lucian Nagy; Florin Boka; Roland Kiss	3:26
Total length:				15:05
