= Dillon (singer) =

Brazilian singer, songwriter, pianist (born 1988)

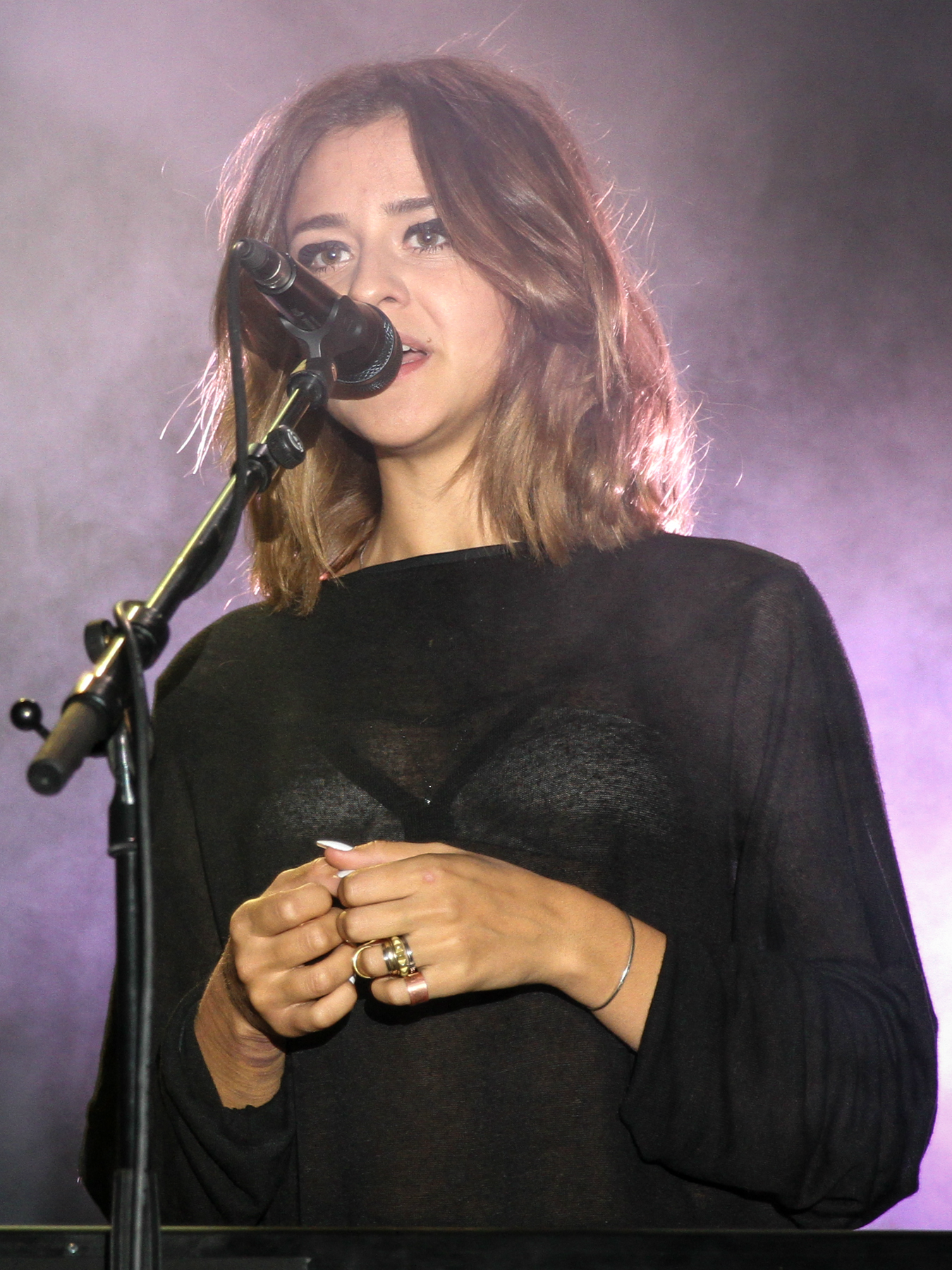
- Dillon at Berlin Festival 2013

Background information
- Born: Dominique Dillon de Byington; April 29, 1988 (age 38); São Paulo, São Paulo, Brazil
- Genre: Electronic
- Occupation: Singer-songwriter
- Years active: 2008–present
- Label: BPitch Control
- Website: dillonzky.com

Dominique Dillon de Byington, known by her stage name Dillon (born April 29, 1988), is a Brazilian singer-songwriter and pianist, based in Germany. Her debut album This Silence Kills, released in 2011, was praised by the media and received an average score of 72 on Metacritic based on five reviews. Byington's second album The Unknown was released on March 31, 2014 to positive reviews.

== Early life and career ==
At the age of four, Byington moved with her mother from Brazil to Cologne, Germany. She attended an English school until she graduated high school in 2007. In the same year, she recorded her first song, which she published on the internet. Her first single was released in January 2008 on the label Kitty-Yo. Subsequently, she joined a recently formed band called Jolly Goods on their first tour of Germany. Since 2008, Byington has been living in Berlin, Germany.

Although Dillon's first recordings received overwhelmingly positive acclaim from contemporary critics, she decided to attend university to study photography before performing as a professional musician. On November 11, 2011, Dillon released her debut album This Silence Kills on the techno label BPitch Control. The album was produced by Tamer Fahri Özgenenc and Thies Mynther. Following the album's release and success, Dillon went on tour across Germany.

This Silence Kills garnered positive reviews from most contemporary critics. Critics compared Byington's singing style and vocals to that of other female musicians such as Björk and Lykke Li.

Byington's second album The Unknown was released on March 28, 2014. Her third album Live at Haus der Berliner Festspiele, a live performance incorporating work from both her first and second albums, was released on September 23, 2016.

== Discography ==
=== Albums ===
- This Silence Kills (2011)
- The Unknown (2014)
- Live at Haus der Berliner Festspiele (2016)
- Kind (2017)
- 6abotage (2022)

=== Singles and EPs ===
- "Ludwig" (2008)
- "Tip Tapping / Abrupt Clarity Remix" (2012)
- "Your Flesh Against Mine" (2013)
- "Lightning Sparked" (2014)
- "A Matter of Time" (2014)
- "When Breathing Feels Like Drowning" (2019)

=== Miscellaneous ===
- "C Unseen Sea" (2008)
