= Thee Sacred Souls =

American soul band

- Lead singer Josh Lane performing live at the Newport Jazz Festival, August 1, 2025.

Background information
- Origin: San Diego, California
- Genre: Soul
- Years active: 2019 – present
- Label: Daptone Records
- Members: Sal Samano; Alex Garcia; Josh Lane

Thee Sacred Souls is an American soul trio signed to Daptone Records.

== Background ==
Thee Sacred Souls formed in April 2019, composed of bassist Sal Samano, drummer Alex Garcia, and singer Josh Lane. Garcia and Samano met in San Diego in 2018, forming an instrumental oldies band. They met Lane a few months later, and he joined as a vocalist for the group. The group was inspired by chicano soul, gospel, doo-wop, and oldies music. The group started exclusively as a live band performing at local venues in San Diego at first. After their second show, Bosco Mann invited them to record music at Daptone Records' Penrose Studios in Riverside, California.

Work on their debut self-titled album began in 2019 and finished in 2022. The album's debut single, "Can I Call You Rose?", released on March 18, 2020, was the first song created by the trio. On June 15, 2022, the group announced that their debut self-titled album would be releasing on August 27, 2022, alongside a music video for "Easier Said Than Done".

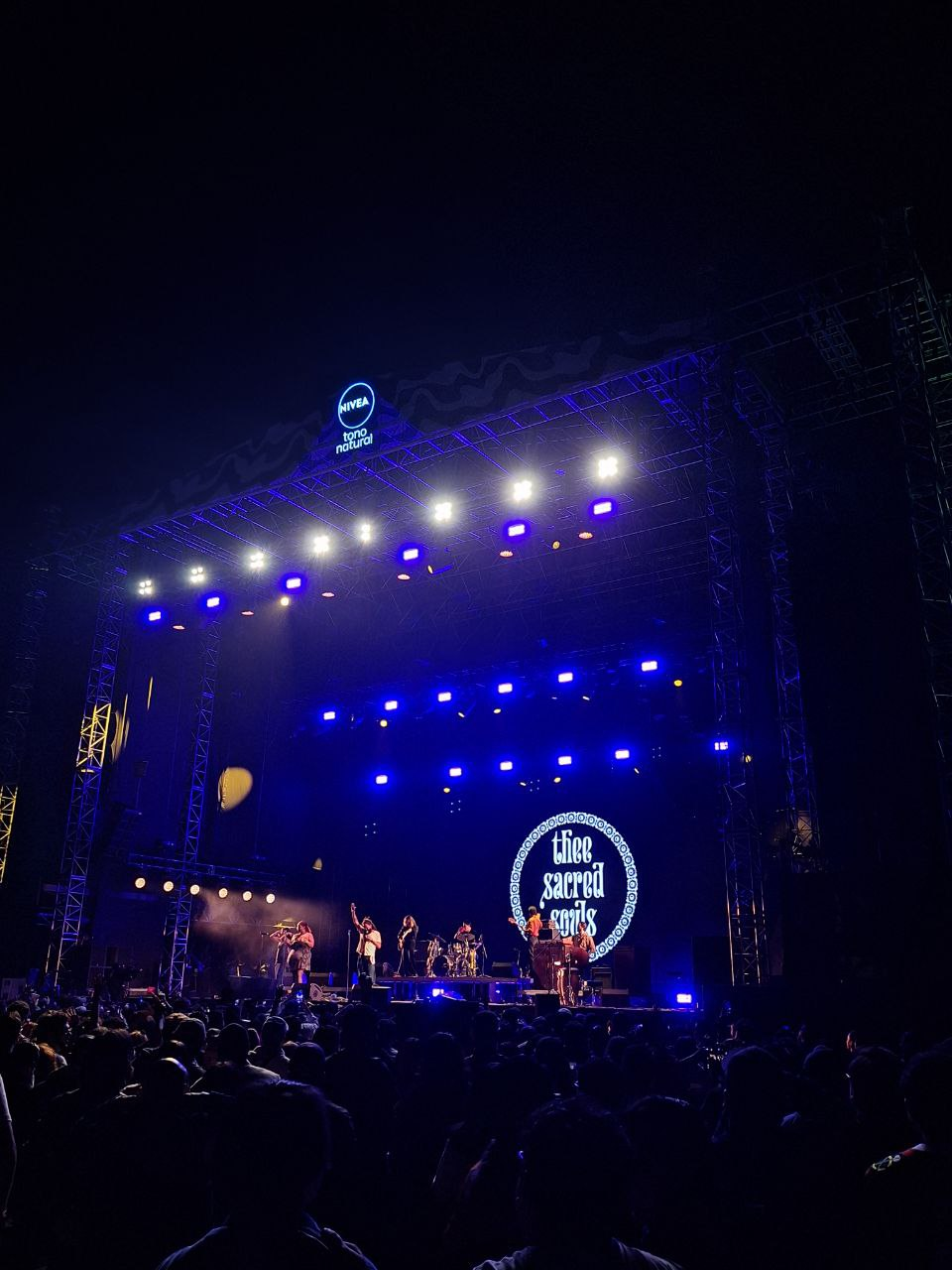
Thee Sacred Souls in Mexico City, 2024

On November 30, 2022, the group performed "Easier Said Than Done" on Jimmy Kimmel Live! The group opened for St. Paul and The Broken Bones' The Alien Coast Tour in 2022. The group headlined a tour in support of the album in 2022 and 2023. The group also opened for Portugal. The Man and Nathaniel Rateliff and the Night Sweats throughout 2023.

A second album, Got a Story to Tell, was announced in 2024.

== Discography ==
- Thee Sacred Souls (Daptone Records, 2022)
- Got a Story to Tell (Daptone, 2024)
