= Denise Dowse =

American actress (1958–2022)

- Born: Denise Yvonne Dowse; February 21, 1958; Honolulu, Territory of Hawaii, U.S.
- Died: August 13, 2022 (aged 64)
- Education: Norfolk State University (BA)
- Occupation: Actress
- Years active: 1988–2022

Denise Yvonne Dowse (February 21, 1958 – August 13, 2022) was an American actress. She was best known for her roles as Mrs. Yvonne Teasley in the television series Beverly Hills, 90210 (1991–2000), Judge Rebecca Damsen in The Guardian (2001–2004), and Dr. Rhonda Pine in Insecure.

Dowse's film roles included Olivia Biggs in Bio-Dome (1996), Sky Marshal Meru in Starship Troopers (1997), Judge Constance Mullen in A Civil Action (1998), Marlene Andre in Ray, Principal Garrison in Coach Carter (2005), and Flora in The Call (2013).

== Early life ==
Denise Yvonne Dowse was born on February 21, 1958, in Honolulu, Hawaii, the daughter of a naval officer. She graduated with a Bachelor of Arts degree from Norfolk State University.

== Career ==
Dowse started acting in 1989, playing Angela Quartermane in an episode of the television series Almost There.

From 1989, she appeared in numerous TV series, such as ALF, Full House, Murphy Brown, Seinfeld, Buffy the Vampire Slayer, ER, Charmed, Shark, The Mentalist, Monk, and House.

Dowse appeared in the 2005 comedy film Guess Who, featuring Bernie Mac and Ashton Kutcher.

Dowse became best known for her role of Yvonne Teasley on Beverly Hills, 90210, after appearing as Judge Rebecca Damsen on The Guardian from 2001 through 2004. From 1993 to 1994, she appeared as a recurring character known as Vice Principal McBride in the television series California Dreams.

From 2000 to 2004, she provided the voice of Officer Shirley in the Nickelodeon animated series Rocket Power for the last three seasons of the show's run, replacing CCH Pounder, who voiced the character in the first season.

In 2020, she appeared as Valeria in the thriller film Fatale, featuring Hilary Swank, Michael Ealy, and Mike Colter.

Dowse directed the drama film Remember Me: The Mahalia Jackson Story, featuring Ledisi, Corbin Bleu, Keith David, Vanessa Williams, and Columbus Short. The film premiered in April 2022, at the 30th Pan African Film and Arts Festival in Los Angeles.

== Death ==
Dowse fell into a coma in August 2022, in connection with meningitis. She died on August 13, 2022, at the age of 64.

An endowed scholarship fund to benefit theater and theater technology students at W.T. Woodson High School (now C.G. Woodson) in Fairfax, Virginia was funded by Dowse's high school friends and family.

== Filmography ==
=== Film ===
Year	Title	Role	Notes
1990	Coldfire	Channing	
1992	Sneakers	Bank Teller	
1992	Out for Blood	Neighborhood Woman	Credited as Denise Y. Dowse
1993	Merchant of Evil	Nurse #1	
1994	Helicopter	Malik's Mother	Short film
1996	Bio-Dome	Olivia Biggs	
1997	Starship Troopers	Sky Marshal Meru	
1998	Pleasantville	Health Teacher	
1998	A Civil Action	Judge Constance Mullen	
1999	K-911	Dr. Perkins, DVM	
2000	Requiem for a Dream	Tyrone's Mother	
2001	Dr. Dolittle 2	Secretary	
2002	Book of Love: The Definitive Reason Why Men Are Dogs	Mom	
2003	Rats	Matilda	
2004	The Seat Filler	Derrick's Mom	
2004	Eulogy	Judge	
2004	Ray	Marlene Andre	
2005	Coach Carter	Principal Garrison	
2005	Guess Who	Lisa	
2007	Reign Over Me	Psychiatric Hospital Therapist	
2007	Her Best Move	Lisa	
2010	Anger Has a Secret	Sarah	
2011	Fly Away	Susan	Credited as Denise Y. Dowse
2012	The Longer Day of Happiness	Lydia Jones	
2013	The Call	Flora	
2017	Please Stand By	Doris the Bus Driver	
2017	Like Father	Olivia	Short film
2017	By His Stripes	Ruth	Short film
2018	A Stone Cold Christmas	Deaconess	
2019	Loners	Clara Maloy	
2020	Grey Streets	Aunt Suzanna	
2020	Fatale	Valeria Tyler	
2020	Celeste's Dream	Dr. Soji Spark	Short film
2022	A Cloud So High	Detective Trina McWilliams	Final film role

=== Television ===
Year	Title	Role	Notes
1989	Almost There!	Angela Quartermane	Episode: "Miss Shelley B."
1989	ALF	FBI #4	Credited as Denise Y. Dowse; Episode: "Wanted Dead or Alive"
1990	Beverly Hills, 90210	Professor Harriet Strathmore	Episode: "The 17 Year Itch"
1991	Jake and the Fatman	Maggie Day	Episode: "Come Along with Me"
1991	Roc	Dr. Worthy	Credited as Denise Y. Dowse; Episode: "Rock-A-Bye Baby"
1991–2000	Beverly Hills, 90210	Vice Principal Yvonne Teasley	23 episodes
1992	Seinfeld	Marsha	Episode: "The Wallet"
1992	Bodies of Evidence	Kim's Mother	Episode: "Afternoon Delights"
1992	Roc	Dr. Russell	Episode: "The Artificial Insemination Story"
1993	Full House	Mrs. Jacobs	Episode: "Be True to Your Pre-School"
1993	Thea	Laverne	Episode: "A Christmas Story"
1993–1994	California Dreams	Vice Principal McBride	Recurring cast
1994	The Enemy Within	Dr. Jarvis	Television film
1994	Murphy Brown	Woman #2	Episode: "Brown vs. the Board of Education"
1994	Seinfeld	Elenore	Episode: "The Couch"
1995	See Jane Run		Television film
1995	Sketch Artist II: Hands That See	Dispatcher	
1995	Vanishing Son	Trailer Park Neighbor	Episode: "Sweet Sixteen"
1995	Kissing Miranda	Cristianne	Television film
1996	Touched by an Angel	Judge Caldwell	Episode: "Flesh and Blood"
1996	Men Behaving Badly	Mrs. Carlson	Episode: "Drunken Proposal"
1997	Killing Mr. Griffin	Detective Pruitt	Television film
1997	Tracey Takes On...	Arthell	Episode: "Race Relations"
1997	Ink	Mrs. Punter	Episode: "Logan's Run"
1997	Buffy the Vampire Slayer	Ms. Miller	Episode: "Out of Mind, Out of Sight"
1997	Built to Last	Sylvia Watkins	8 episodes
1997	Chicago Hope	Doris Harper	Episode: "On Golden Pons"
1998	NewsRadio	Adoption Agent	Episode: "Look Who's Talking"
1998	Step by Step	Judge Martin	Episode: "And Justice for Some"
1998	ER	Mrs. Lysell	Episode: "Day for Knight"
1998	Any Day Now	Councilwoman Rene Broussard	Episode: "No Comment"
1998	Sister, Sister	Alease	Episode: "The Domino Effect"
1998	Party of Five	Nora	Episode: "Gifts"
1999	Promised Land	Mrs. Groves	Episode: "What's in a Word"
1999	Recess	Additional Voice	Episode: "The Candidate"
1999	Rugrats	Sheila Swann	Voice, episode: "Tommy for Mayor"
2000	Moesha	Hattie	Episode: "Secrets & Lies"
2000	The West Wing	Nurse #1	Uncredited; Episode: "In the Shadow of Two Gunmen: Part 1"
2000	Grown Ups	Gloria	Episode: "New Job"
2000–2004	Rocket Power	Officer Shirley	Voice, 7 episodes
2001	Becker	Janet Katz	Episode: "The Trouble with Harry"
2001	The Practice	Caroline	Episode: "The Thin Line"
2001	The Drew Carey Show	Doctor #2	Episode: "Drew and the Baby"
2001	Girlfriends	Emily Griffin	Episode: "The Burning Vagina Monologues"
2001–2004	The Guardian	Judge Rebecca Damsen	32 episodes
2002	Philly	Sondra Herman	Episode: "Mojo Rising"
2002	What About Your Friends: Weekend Getaway	Mona	Television film
2002	Judging Amy	Ms. Shepard	Episode: "Lost in the System"
2002	Without a Trace	Mrs. Ray	Episode: "Little Big Man"
2003	Dragnet	Juanita Hendrucks	3 episodes
2003	Girlfriends	Lucyruth	Episode: "Inherit the Lynn"
2004	Nip/Tuck	Cecily Sutherland	Episode: "Joel Gideon"
2004	Everwood	Laura Hoover	Episode: "The Birds and the Batteries"
2004–2006	All of Us	Counselor / Dr. Shapiro	4 episodes
2005	Inconceivable	Alice Godchaux	Episode: "Balls in Your Court"
2005	Threshold	Dr. Margaret Johnson	Episode: "Progeny"
2005–2006	Charmed	Angel of Destiny	3 episodes
2006	The Bernie Mac Show	Doctor	Episode: "Exercise in Fertility: Part 2"
2007	Gilmore Girls	Judge	Episode: "To Whom It May Concern"
2007	Law & Order	Judge Nora Glover	Episode: "Good Faith"
2007	Shark	Judge Jane Briar	3 episodes
2008	The Mentalist	Detective Carla Mulvey	Episode: "Ladies in Red"
2009	Saving Grace	Mrs. Williams	Episode: "Take Me Somewhere, Earl"
2009	Monk	Samantha Austin	Episode: "Mr. Monk and the Dog"
2010	House	Glenda	Episode: "Moving the Chains"
2010	Class	Patty Allen	Television film
2011	Bones	Dr. Sherry Bannon	Episode: "The Change in the Game"
2011	Reed Between the Lines	Ms. Ellis	Episode: "Let's Talk About Boundaries"
2011–2012	Criminal Minds	Yvonne Burns	2 episodes
2013	Monday Mornings	Mrs. Fisher	Episode: "Family Ties"
2013	Rizzoli & Isles	Judge	Episode: "Dance with the Devil"
2014	Hungry	Ann	Episode: "Interviews"
2014	Laugh Gym	Agnes	Television film
2015	Secrets and Lies	Elaine Williams	9 episodes
2016	Castle	Judge Gloria Wollcott	Episode: "Witness for the Prosecution"
2016	Murder in the First	Rainelle James	3 episodes
2017–2018	Imposters	Auntie Colleen / Agent Cook	10 episodes
2017–2020	Insecure	Dr. Rhonda Pine	6 episodes
2018	The X-Files	Dr. Babsi Russel	Episode: "Plus One"
2018	Mr. Mercedes	Judge Helfrick	Episode: "Fade to Blue"
2019	9-1-1	David's Wife	Episode: "Chimney Begins"
2019	Good Trouble	Naomi / Secretary	4 episodes
2019	New Amsterdam	Alfreda Watson	Episode: "Righteous Right Hand"
2019	The Resident	Carol Austin	2 episodes
2019–2021	Snowfall	Mrs. Mosley	2 episodes
2020	Grey's Anatomy	Lorraine Simms	Episode: "Help Me Through the Night"
2020	Stumptown	Mrs. Hofman	2 episodes
2020	Pandemically Single	Donna Sawyer	Unknown episodes
2021	Three Days	Will's Mom	Episode: "Pilot"
2021	The Wedding Games	Susan Clearwater	Television film
2021	Bronzeville	Emma / Sarah Davis	2 episodes

=== Video games ===
Year	Title	Role	Notes
2002	Rocket Power: Beach Bandits	Officer Shirley, Female Shoobie	
