= Summer of Soul (soundtrack) =

Summer of Soul (...Or, When the Revolution Could Not Be Televised) [Original Motion Picture Soundtrack; Live at the Harlem Cultural Festival, 1969]

Soundtrack album by Various artists
- Released: January 21, 2022
- Genre: Pop; rock; soul; R&B; jazz; latin; blues; gospel
- Length: 1:23:45
- Label: Legacy
- Compiler: Questlove

Singles from Summer of Soul (...Or, When the Revolution Could Not Be Televised) [Original Motion Picture Soundtrack]
- 1. "Sing a Simple Song" Released: December 9, 2021

Summer of Soul (...Or, When the Revolution Could Not Be Televised) [Original Motion Picture Soundtrack] is the accompanying soundtrack to the 2021 American documentary film Summer of Soul directed by Ahmir "Questlove" Thompson, which covers the 1969 Harlem Cultural Festival. Like the documentary film, the live recordings did not have an official public release for more than 50 years. The album featured 17 live renditions selected by Questlove, performed over the course of the festival. The songs were recorded by Stevie Wonder, Mahalia Jackson, Nina Simone, the 5th Dimension, the Staple Singers, Gladys Knight & the Pips, Mavis Staples, Blinky Williams, Sly and the Family Stone, and the Chambers Brothers and featured a range of genres, like rock, R&B, soul, jazz, pop, gospel.

As Questlove had to license copyrights for the track, the compilation soundtrack did not have an official release along with the film in June 2021. It was officially announced on December 9, 2021, with Legacy Recordings distributing the album. "Sing a Simple Song" was released as the lead single from the album on the same date. The album was released on January 21, 2022, in digital and CD; where the physical release had excluded one of the tracks from the album. An official vinyl release of the soundtrack was announced on Target, which released exclusively through their website on June 17, and a general release on July 1, by Rough Trade Records.

Questlove initially considered on including songs that were not in the film, but decided to stick with the music that had already been cleared for release. He assured that the film's deluxe version will have more songs to choose from that, which will be cleared in time for release.

== Reception ==
Professional ratings
Aggregate scores
Source	Rating
Metacritic	94/100
Review scores
Source	Rating
AllMusic	4/5 stars
DownBeat	3.5/5 stars
Pitchfork	8.8/10
Rolling Stone	4/5 stars

Prior to the official release, Cleveland Magazine's official report for the week's (January 21–27) music releases, featured Summer of Soul soundtrack topping the first position in the highly awaited albums. It received generally positive reviews, with Metacritic, which uses a weighted average, assigned the album a score of 94 out of 100, based on 4 critics, indicating "universal acclaim".

David Browne's four-star review for Rolling Stone, stated "The soundtrack for Questlove's acclaimed music-festival doc shows the way R&B and soul were moving in inspired new directions by the end of the Sixties". Pitchfork's Stephen M. Deusner gave 8.8 out of 10 to the soundtrack and exclaimed that the soundtrack "tells a nuanced story of Black creativity and perseverance at the end of a transformative decade". Deusner also opined "It's alarming how many of the issues cited by artists and presenters persist today—police violence, systemic racism, poverty, cultural erasure—yet that makes the music sound fresh, lively, relevant in its celebration and commiseration. Both the film and the soundtrack bear that weight of history gracefully and jubilantly."

Daniel Margolis of DownBeat wrote "Fair point, but perhaps it's for the best that this isn't present on the album, because what you're left with is the pure joy of the music, and the connection between the performers and the audience. The movie ends with the film and music industry's disinterest toward what happened — notice that this soundtrack hasn't been filling used vinyl crates for decades. Regardless, it's here now." Andy Kellman of AllMusic stated "Anyone who has seen the film won't be surprised by the remarkable quality of the recordings, bearing minor blemishes only the stuffiest audiophile would care about. Even if the fidelity was halved, there would be more than enough power and sociopolitical context in these performances to induce goose bumps, tears, and other physical and emotional reactions. The succession of voices is astonishing. This and the film belong in every library on the planet."

It was named as "one of the best albums of 2022" by Rolling Stone, Pitchfork, NME, NPR, Stereogum, Paste and Okayplayer for their half-yearly lists. Collider and Little White Lies ranked 8th and 10th, respectively, in their "best soundtracks of 2021", despite the soundtrack being officially released in 2022. Writing for Collider, Kareem Gantt had said "The soundtrack was even more dynamic, featuring some of soul and funk's biggest hitmakers, from David Ruffin's 'My Girl' to the funky baritones of Sly & The Family Stone, who had two cuts make the sizzling soundtrack. The musical revolution wasn't televised: it was caught on vinyl."

== Track listing ==
=== Digital release ===
No.	Title	Performer(s)	Length
1.	"Uptown"	The Chambers Brothers	6:07
2.	"Why I Sing the Blues"	B.B. King	2:20
3.	"Don't Cha Hear Me Callin' to Ya"	The 5th Dimension	3:31
4.	"Aquarius/Let The Sunshine In (The Flesh Failures)"	The 5th Dimension	6:54
5.	"My Girl"	David Ruffin	5:48
6.	"Oh Happy Day"	The Edwin Hawkins Singers	3:56
7.	"It's Been a Change"	The Staple Singers	3:20
8.	"Precious Lord Take My Hand"	The Operation Breadbasket Orchestra & Choir; Mahalia Jackson; Mavis Staples	8:57
9.	"I Heard It Through the Grapevine"	Gladys Knight & the Pips	4:35
10.	"Watermelon Man"	Mongo Santamaría	5:17
11.	"Together"	Ray Barretto	4:41
12.	"Hold On, I'm Comin'"	Herbie Mann	7:03
13.	"Sing a Simple Song"	Sly and the Family Stone	5:28
14.	"Everyday People"	Sly and the Family Stone	2:32
15.	"Africa"	Abbey Lincoln; Max Roach	3:15
16.	"Backlash Blues"	Nina Simone	3:07
17.	"Are You Ready"	Nina Simone	7:01
Total length:			1:23:45

=== Physical release ===
No.	Title	Performer(s)	Length
1.	"Uptown"	The Chambers Brothers	6:07
2.	"Why I Sing the Blues"	B.B. King	2:20
3.	"Don't Cha Hear Me Callin' to Ya"	The 5th Dimension	3:31
4.	"Aquarius/Let The Sunshine in (The Flesh Failures)"	The 5th Dimension	6:54
5.	"My Girl"	David Ruffin	5:48
6.	"Oh Happy Day"	The Edwin Hawkins Singers	3:56
7.	"It's Been a Change"	The Staple Singers	3:20
8.	"Precious Lord Take My Hand"	The Operation Breadbasket Orchestra & Choir; Mahalia Jackson; Mavis Staples	8:57
9.	"I Heard It Through the Grapevine"	Gladys Knight & the Pips	4:35
10.	"Watermelon Man"	Mongo Santamaría	5:17
11.	"Together"	Ray Barretto	4:41
12.	"Hold On, I'm Comin'"	Herbie Mann	7:03
13.	"Sing a Simple Song"	Sly and the Family Stone	5:28
14.	"Everyday People"	Sly and the Family Stone	2:32
15.	"Backlash Blues"	Nina Simone	3:07
16.	"Are You Ready"	Nina Simone	7:01
Total length:			1:20:30

== Release history ==
Release dates and formats for Summer of Soul (...Or, When the Revolution Could Not Be Televised) [Original Motion Picture Soundtrack]
Region	Date	Format(s)	Label	Version(s)	Ref.
Various	January 21, 2022	Digital download; streaming	Legacy Recordings	Standard	
United States Europe	January 21, 2022	CD	Legacy Recordings	Standard	
United States Europe	June 17, 2022	Vinyl	Ultra	Target exclusive	
United States Europe	July 1, 2022	CD	Ultra	Standard	
Canada	February 4, 2022	CD	Sony Music Canada	Standard	
Japan	March 30, 2022	CD	Sony Music Entertainment Japan	Standard	

== Charts ==
Chart performance for Summer of Soul (...Or, When the Revolution Could Not Be Televised) [Original Motion Picture Soundtrack]
Chart (2022)	Peak position
UK Compilation Albums (OCC)	1
UK Soundtrack Albums (OCC)	5
US Billboard 200	12
US Pop Albums (Billboard)	8
US Soundtrack Albums (Billboard)	3
