= List of Ivor Novello Award winners and nominees (2010s–2020s) =

The Ivor Novello Awards are held annually since 1956 by the Ivors Academy, formerly the British Academy of Songwriters, Composers and Authors, to recognize the excellence in songwriting and composing. The following list consists of all the winners and nominees of the awards by year, the winners are listed first and in bold followed by the nominees if present.

The awards and nominations are received by the songwriters of the nominated work, not the performers, unless they also have songwriting credits.

== 2010s ==
=== 2010 ===
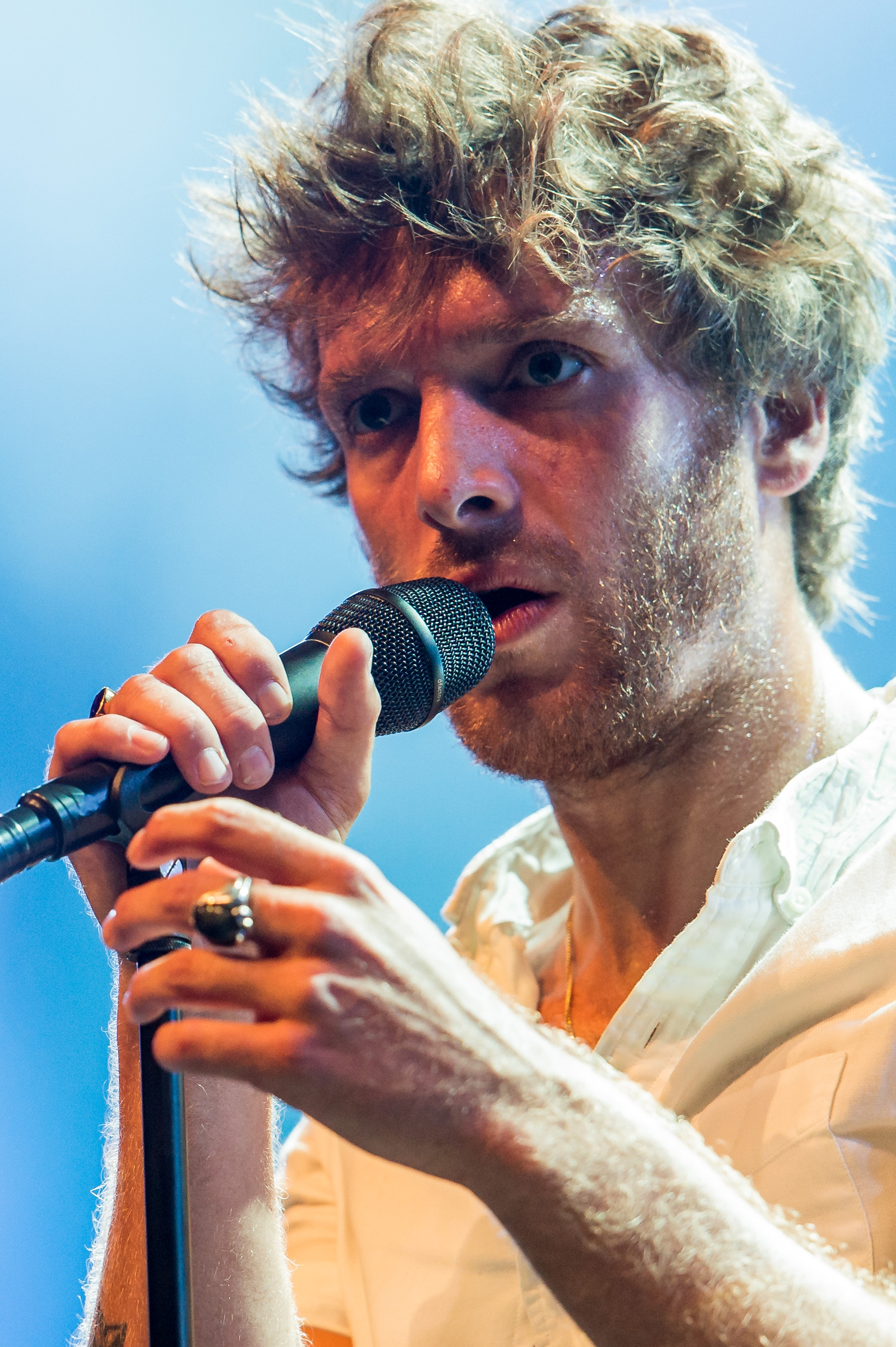
Paolo Nutini received the Album Award.

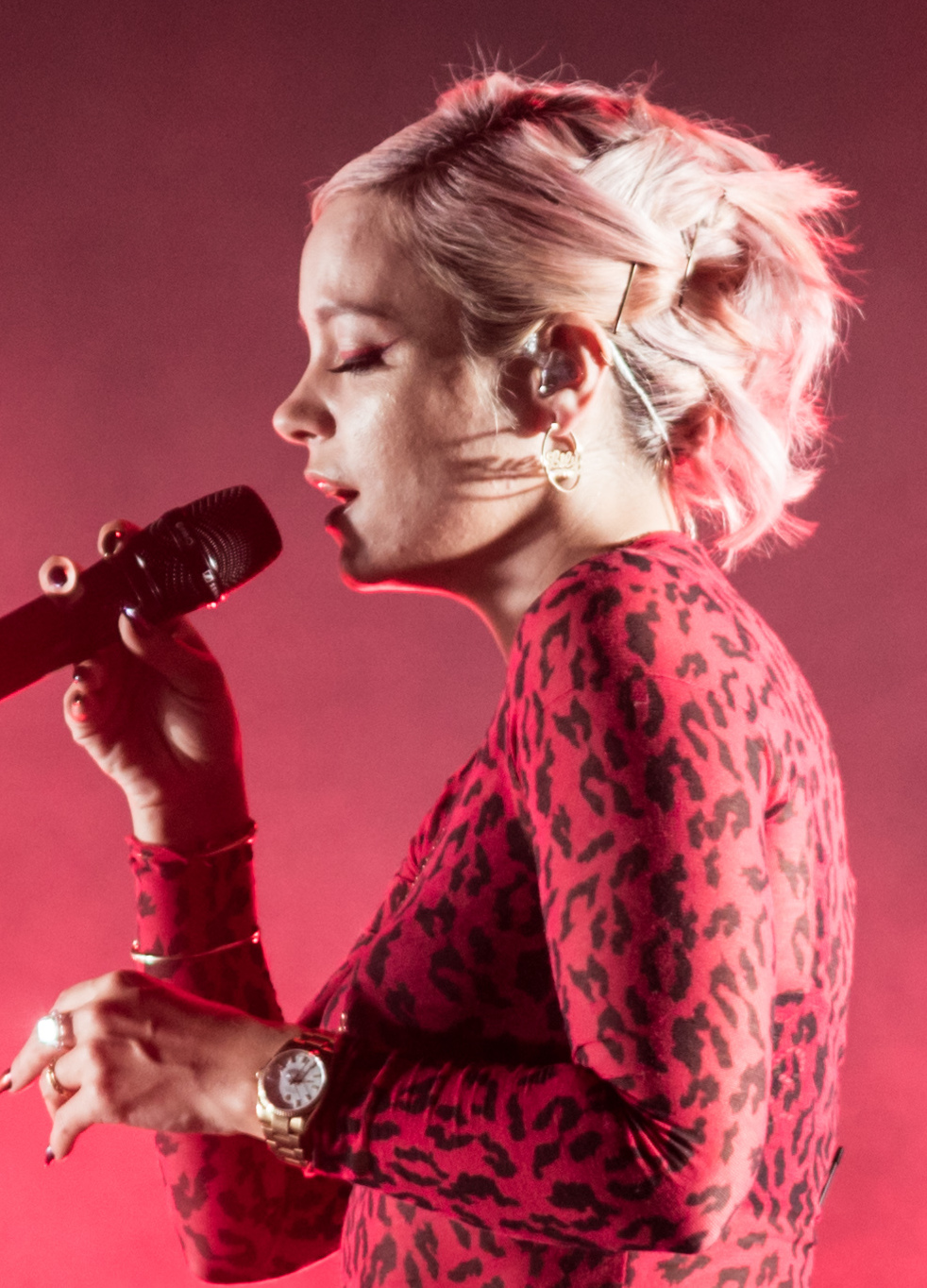
Lily Allen won Best Song Musically and Lyrically, Most Performed Work and Songwriter of the Year, all three alongside Greg Kurstin.

The 55th Ivor Novello Awards were presented on May 20, 2010, at the Grosvenor House, London.

Category	Recipient and nominees
Album Award	**Sunny Side Up – Written and performed by Paolo Nutini**; The Duckworth Lewis Method – Written by Neil Hannon and Thomas Walsh; Performed by The Duckworth Lewis Method; Tongue n' Cheek – Written by Nicholas Detnon and Dylan Mills; Performed by Dizzee Rascal
Best Contemporary Song	**"Daniel" – Written by Natasha Khan; Performed by Bat for Lashes**; "Bonkers" – Written by Dylan Mills and Armand Van Helden; Performed by Dizzee Rascal; "In for the Kill" – Written by Elly Jackson and Ben Langmaid; Performed by La Roux
Best Original Film Score	**Ice Age: Dawn of the Dinosaurs – Composed by John Powell**; Skin – Composed by Hélène Muddiman; The Young Victoria – Composed by Ilan Eshkeri
Best Original Video Game Score	**Killzone 2 – Composed by Joris de Man**; Empire: Total War – Composed by Richard Beddow, Richard Birdsall, Walter Mair, Lorenzo Piggici and Simon Ravn; Savage Moon: Waldgeist – Composed by Armin Elsaesser
Best Song Musically and Lyrically	**"The Fear" – Written by Lily Allen and Greg Kurstin; Performed by Lily Allen**; "Save It for Someone Who Cares" – Written by Nick Hemming; Performed by The Leisure Society; "The Last Bus" – Written by Ed Adlard, Will Adlard, Ali Digby and George Eddy; Performed by Patch William
Best Television Soundtrack	**Desperate Romantics – Composed by Daniel Pemberton**; Life – Composed by George Fenton; Red Riding 1974 – Composed by Adrian Johnston
International Achievement	**Imogen Heap**
Lifetime Achievement	**Paul Weller**
PRS for Music Most Performed Work	**"The Fear" – Written by Lily Allen and Greg Kurstin; Performed by Lily Allen**; "Broken Strings" – Written by James Morrison, Fraser T. Smith and Nina Woodford; Performed by James Morrison; "The Promise" – Written by Nick Coler, Miranda Cooper, Brian Higgins, Kieran Jones, Tim Powell, Jason Resch and Carla Marie Williams; Performed by Girls Aloud
PRS for Music Outstanding Contribution to British Music	**Trevor Horn**
PRS for Music Special International Award	**Neil Sedaka**
Songwriters of the Year	**Lily Allen and Greg Kurstin**
The Ivors Classical Music Award	**Peter Maxwell Davies**
The Ivors Inspiration Award	**Johnny Marr**

=== 2011 ===
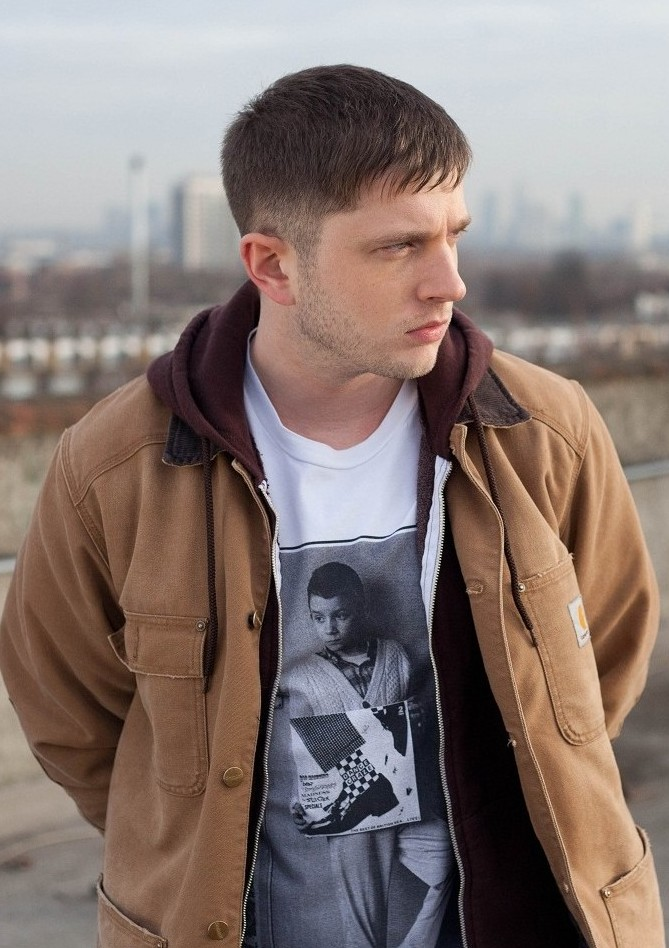
Plan B won the Album Award, Most Performed Work and Songwriter of the Year.

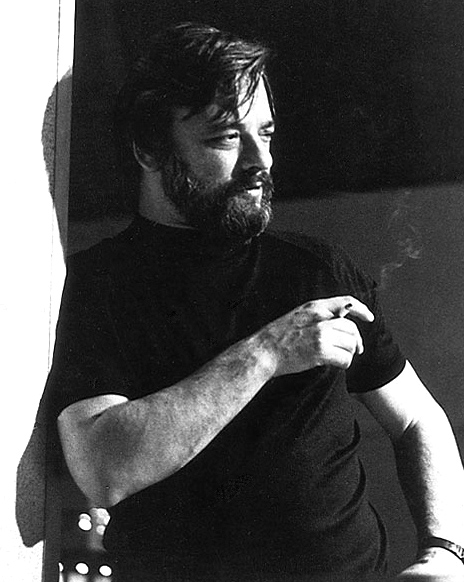
Stephen Sondheim received the Special International Award.

The 56th Ivor Novello Awards were presented on May 19, 2011, at the Grosvenor House, London.

Category	Recipient and nominees
Album Award	**The Defamation of Strickland Banks – Written by Ben Drew; Performed by Plan B**; Flaws – Written by Jack Steadman; Performed by Bombay Bicycle Club; Man Alive – Written by Jonathan Higgs, Jeremy Pritchard, Alexander Robertshaw and Michael Spearman; Performed by Everything Everything
Best Contemporary Song	**"Pass Out" – Written by Timothy McKenzie, Patrick Okogwu and Marc Williams; Performed by Tinie Tempah**; "Islands" – Written by Romy Madley Croft, Baria Qureshi, Oliver Sim and James Smith; Performed by the xx; "Katy on a Mission" – Written by Benga, Katy B and Geeneus; Performed by Katy B
Best Original Film Score	**How to Train Your Dragon – Composed by John Powell**; Monsters – Composed by Jon Hopkins; Unstoppable – Composed by Harry Gregson-Williams
Best Original Video Game Score	**Napoleon: Total War – Composed by Richard Beddow, Richard Birdsall and Ian Livingstone**; Enslaved: Odyssey to the West – Composed by Nitin Sawhney; James Bond 007: Blood Stone – Composed by Richard Jacques
Best Song Musically and Lyrically	**"Becoming a Jackal" – Written by Conor O'Brien; Performed by Villagers**; "MY KZ, UR BF" – Written by Jonathan Higgs, Jeremy Pritchard, Alexander Robertshaw and Michael Spearman; Performed by Everything Everything; "Spanish Sahara" – Written by Jack Bevan, Edwin Congreave, Walter Gervers, Yannis Philippakis and James Smith; Performed by Foals
Best Television Soundtrack	**Any Human Heart – Composed by Dan Jones**; Agatha Christie's Marple (Series V) – Composed by Dominik Scherrer; Terry Pratchett's Going Postal – Composed by John Lunn
International Achievement	**Muse (Matt Bellamy, Dominic Howard and Chris Wolstenholme)**
Outstanding Song Collection	**Steve Winwood**
PRS for Music Most Performed Work	**"She Said" – Written by Eric Appapoulay, Richard Cassell, Ben Drew and Tom Wright-Goss; Performed by Plan B**; "All the Lovers" – Written by Jim Eliot and Mima Stilwell; Performed by Kylie Minogue; "This Ain't a Love Song" – Written by Roy Stride; Performed by Scouting for Girls
PRS for Music Outstanding Contribution to British Music	**Paul Rodgers**
PRS for Music Special International Award	**Stephen Sondheim**
Songwriter of the Year	**Ben Drew**
The Ivors Classical Music Award	**Michael Nyman**
The Ivors Inspiration Award	**Dizzie Rascal**

=== 2012 ===
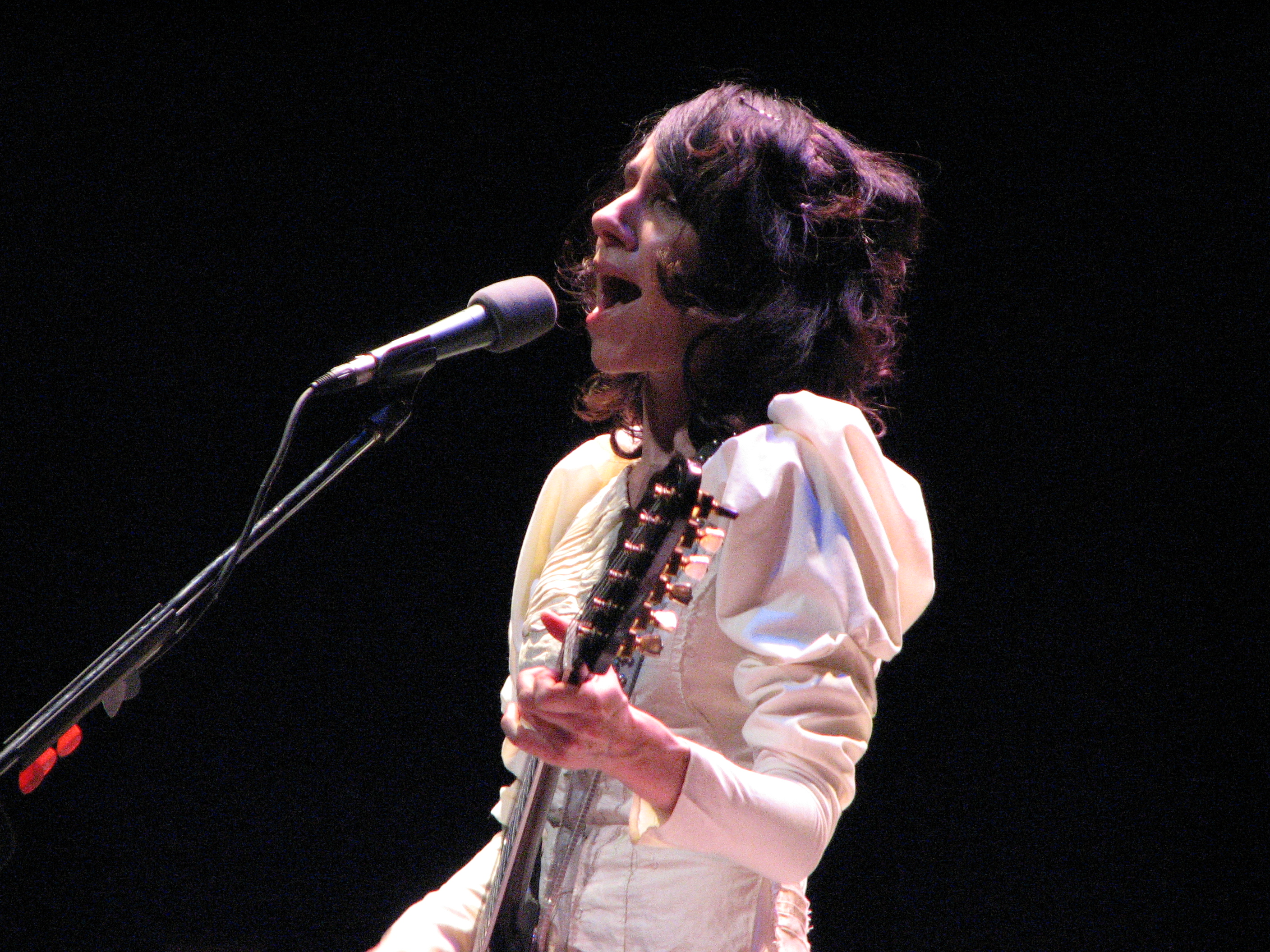
PJ Harvey won the Album Award.

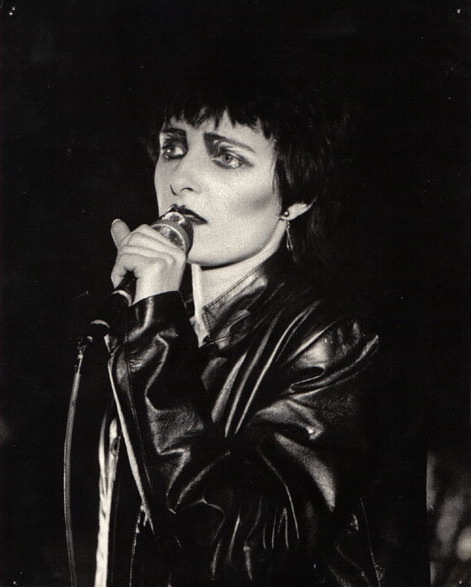
Siouxsie Sioux received the Ivors Inspiration Award.

The 57th Ivor Novello Awards were presented on May 17, 2012, at the Grosvenor House, London.

Category	Recipient and nominees
Album Award	**Let England Shake – Written and performed by PJ Harvey**; 50 Words for Snow – Written and performed by Kate Bush; 21 – Written by Adele Atkins and Paul Epworth; Performed by Adele
Best Contemporary Song	**"Video Games" – Written by Lana Del Rey and Justin Parker; Performed by Lana Del Rey**; "Promises" – Written by Joseph Ray, Daniel Stephens and Alana Watson; Performed by Nero; "The Wilhelm Scream" – Written by James Blake and James Litherland; Performed by James Blake
Best Original Film Score	**The First Grader – Composed by Alex Heffes**; Life in a Day – Composed by Harry Gregson-Williams; We Need to Talk About Kevin – Composed by Jonny Greenwood
Best Song Musically and Lyrically	**"The A Team" – Written and performed by Ed Sheeran**; "Rolling in the Deep" – Written by Adele Atkins and Paul Epworth; Performed by Adele; "Shake It Out" – Written by Paul Epworth, Kid Harpoon and Florence Welch; Performed by Florence + the Machine
Best Television Soundtrack	**The Shadow Line – Composed by Martin Phipps**; Leonardo – Composed by Mark Russell; Page Eight – Composed by Paul Englishby
Lifetime Achievement	**Mark Knopfler**
Outstanding Song Collection	**Gary Kemp**
PRS for Music Most Performed Work	**"Rolling in the Deep" – Written by Adele Atkins and Paul Epworth; Performed by Adele**; "Someone Like You" – Written by Adele Atkins and Dan Wilson; Performed by Adele; "The Flood" – Written by Gary Barlow, Howard Donald, Mark Owen, Robbie Williams and Jason Orange; Performed by Take That
PRS for Music Outstanding Contribution to British Music	**Take That (Gary Barlow, Howard Donald, Mark Owen, Robbie Williams and Jason Orange)**
PRS for Music Special International Award	**Jimmy Webb**
Songwriter of the Year	**Adele Adkins**
The Ivors Inspiration Award	**Siouxsie Sioux**
The Ivors Jazz Award	**Stan Tracey**

=== 2013 ===
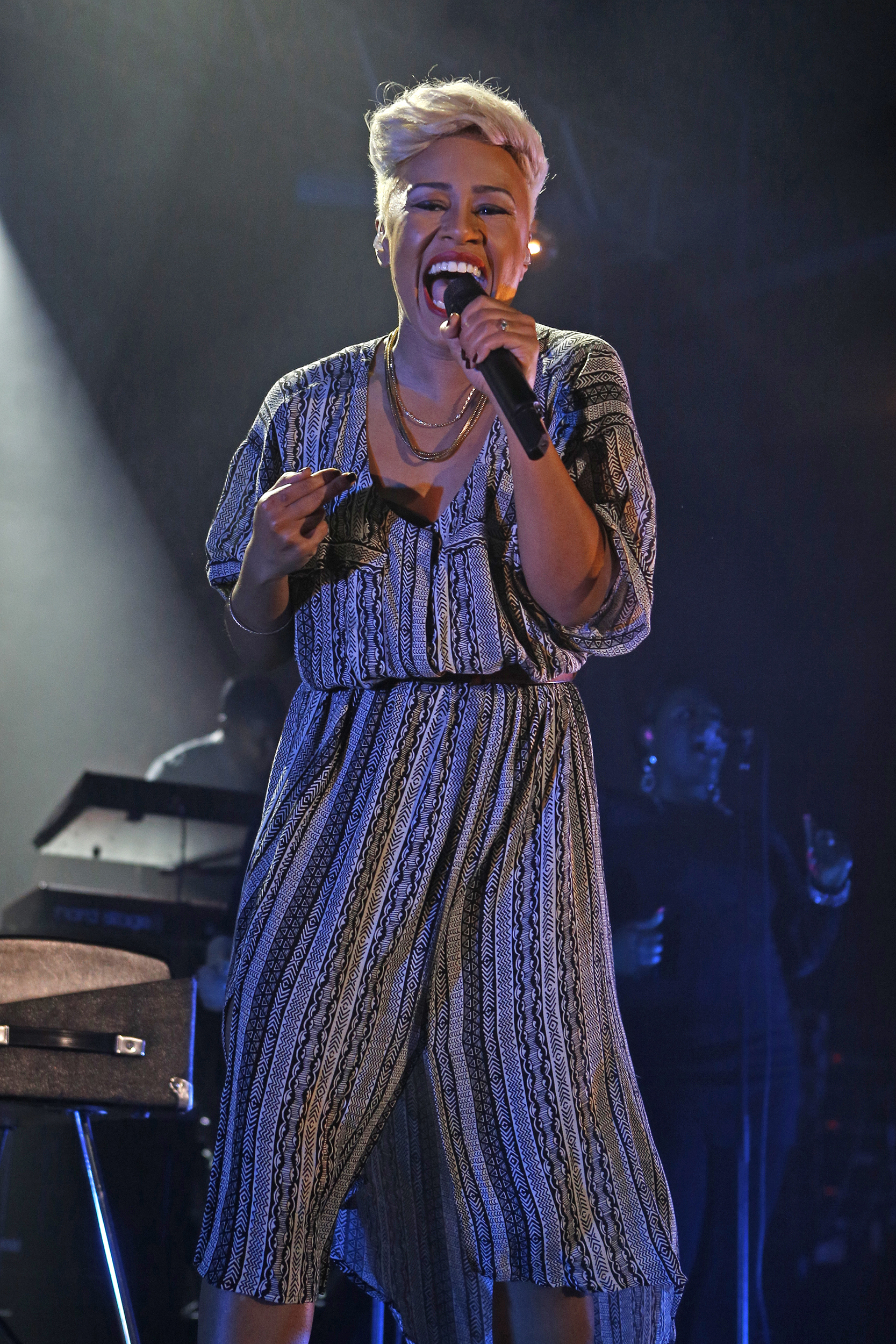
Emeli Sandé won Best Song Musically and Lyrically and Most Performed Work alongside Hugo Chegwin, Harry Craze and Anup Paul.

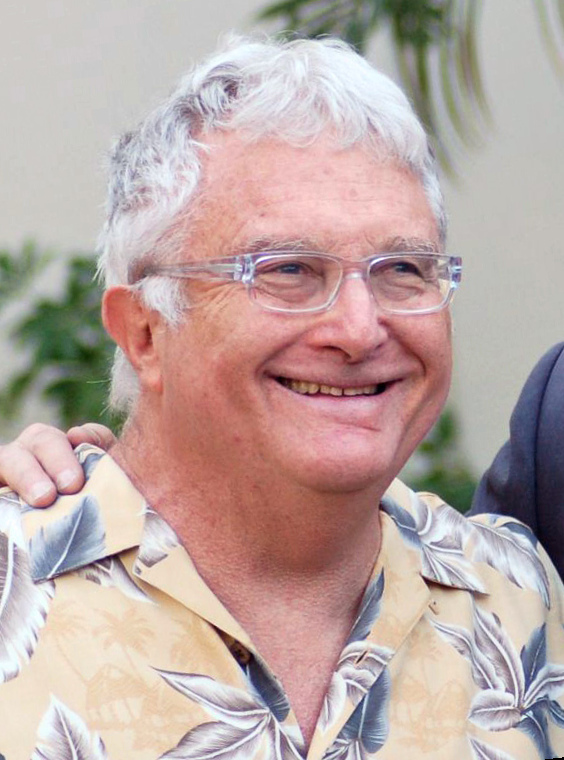
Randy Newman won the Special International Award and the Songwriter of the Year award.

The 59th Ivor Novello Awards were presented on May 13, 2013, at the Grosvenor House, London.

Category	Recipient and nominees
Album Award	**An Awesome Wave – Written by Thomas Green, Joe Newman, Gwilym Sainsbury and Augustus Unger-Hamilton; Performed by alt-j**; Every Kingdom – Written and performed by Ben Howard; Is Your Love Big Enough? – Written by Lianne Barnes and Matthew Hales; Performed by Lianne La Havas
Best Contemporary Song	**"Pelican" – Written by Sam Doyle, Rupert Jarvis, Orlando Weeks, Felix White and Hugo White; Performed by The Maccabees**; "Fitzpleasure" – Written by Thomas Green, Joe Newman, Gwilym Sainsbury and Augustus Unger-Hamilton; Performed by alt-j; "ill Manors" – Written by Pierre Baigorry, David Conen, Benjamin Drew, Vincent Graf-Schlippenbach, Dmitri Shostakovich and Al Shux; Performed by Plan B
Best Original Film Score	**Anna Karenina – Composed by Dario Marianelli**; Dr. Seuss' The Lorax – Composed by John Powell; Ill Manors – Composed by Benjamin Drew and Al Shux
Best Song Musically and Lyrically	**"Next to Me" – Written by Hugo Chegwin, Harry Craze, Anup Paul and Emeli Sandé; Performed by Emeli Sandé**; "Laura" – Written by Natasha Khan and Justin Parker; Performed by Bat for Lashes; "Two Fingers" – Written by Iain Archer and Jake Bugg; Performed by Jake Bugg
Best Television Soundtrack	**Lucian Freud: Painted Life – Composed by John Harle**; The Mystery of Edwin Drood – Composed by John Lunn; Upstairs Downstairs (Series 2) – Composed by Carl Davis
International Achievement	**Gavin Rossdale**
Outstanding Song Collection	**Noel Gallagher**
PRS for Music Award for Outstanding Achievement	**Justin Hayward**
PRS for Music Most Performed Work	**"Next to Me" – Written by Hugo Chegwin, Harry Craze, Anup Paul and Emeli Sandé; Performed by Emeli Sandé**; "Dance with Me Tonight" – Written by Claude Kelly, Oliver Murs and Steve Robson; Performed by Olly Murs; "Paradise" – Written by Guy Berryman, Jonny Buckland, Will Champion, Chris Martin and Brian Eno; Performed by Coldplay
PRS for Music Special International Award	**Randy Newman**
Songwriter of the Year	**Randy Newman**
The Ivors Classical Music Award	**Errollyn Wallen**
The Ivors Inspiration Award	**Marc Almond**

=== 2014 ===
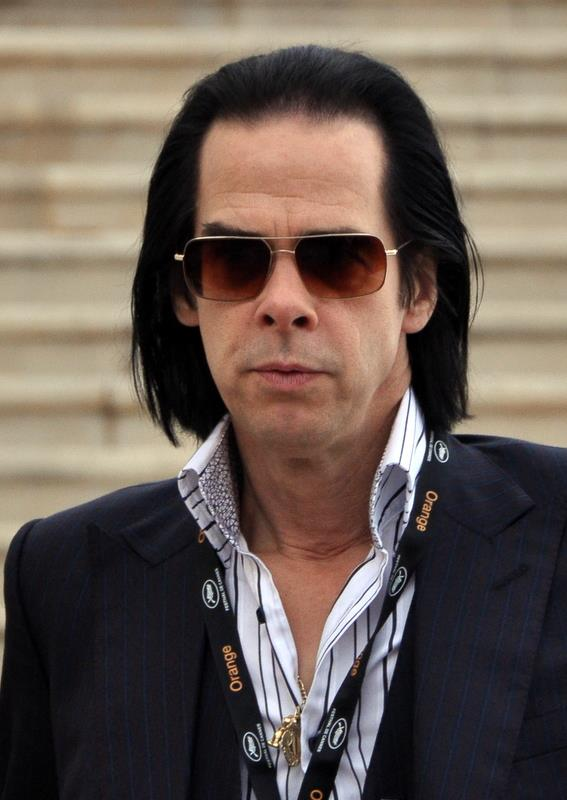

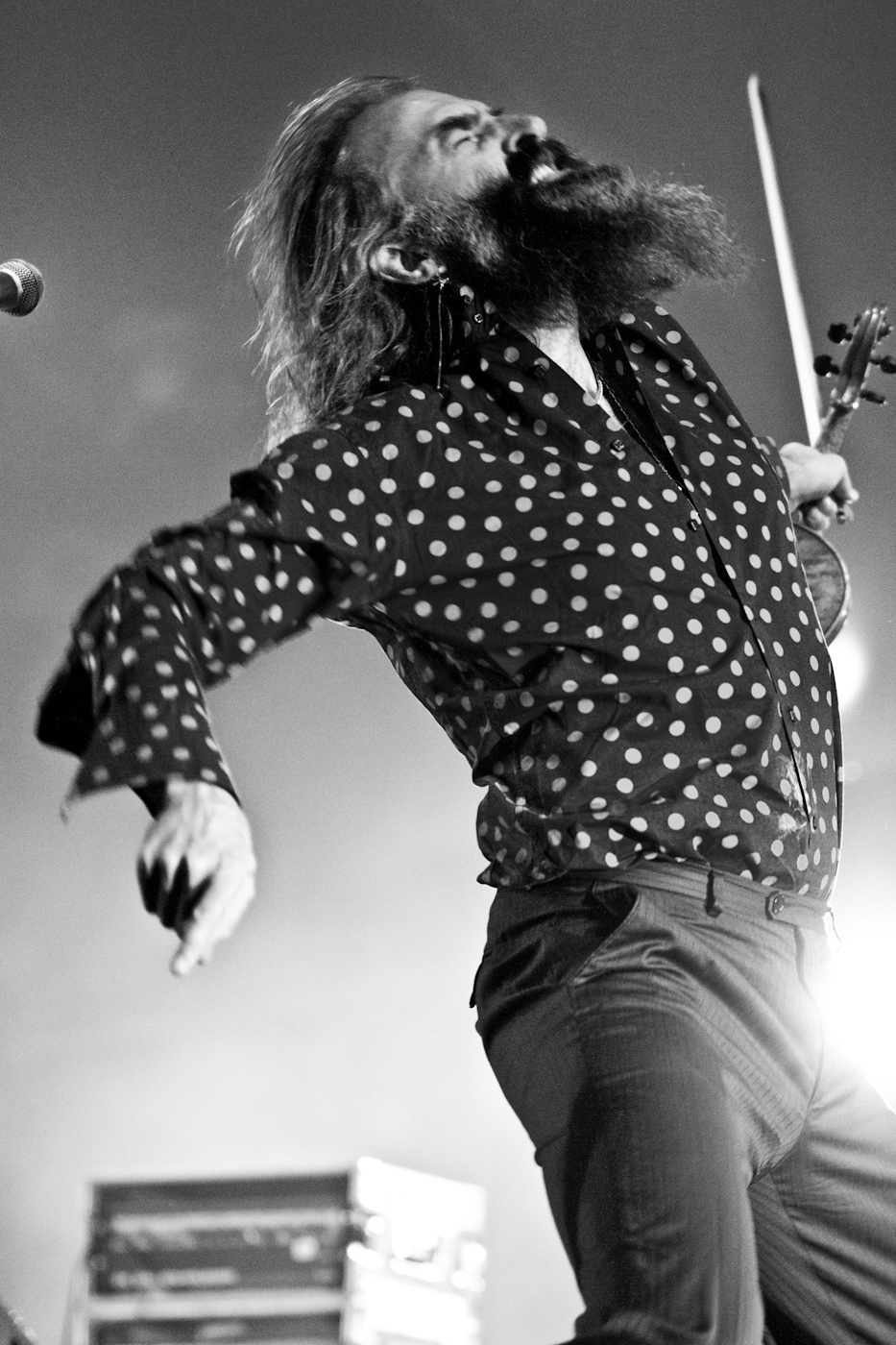
Nick Cave (top) and Warren Ellis (bottom) received the Album Award.

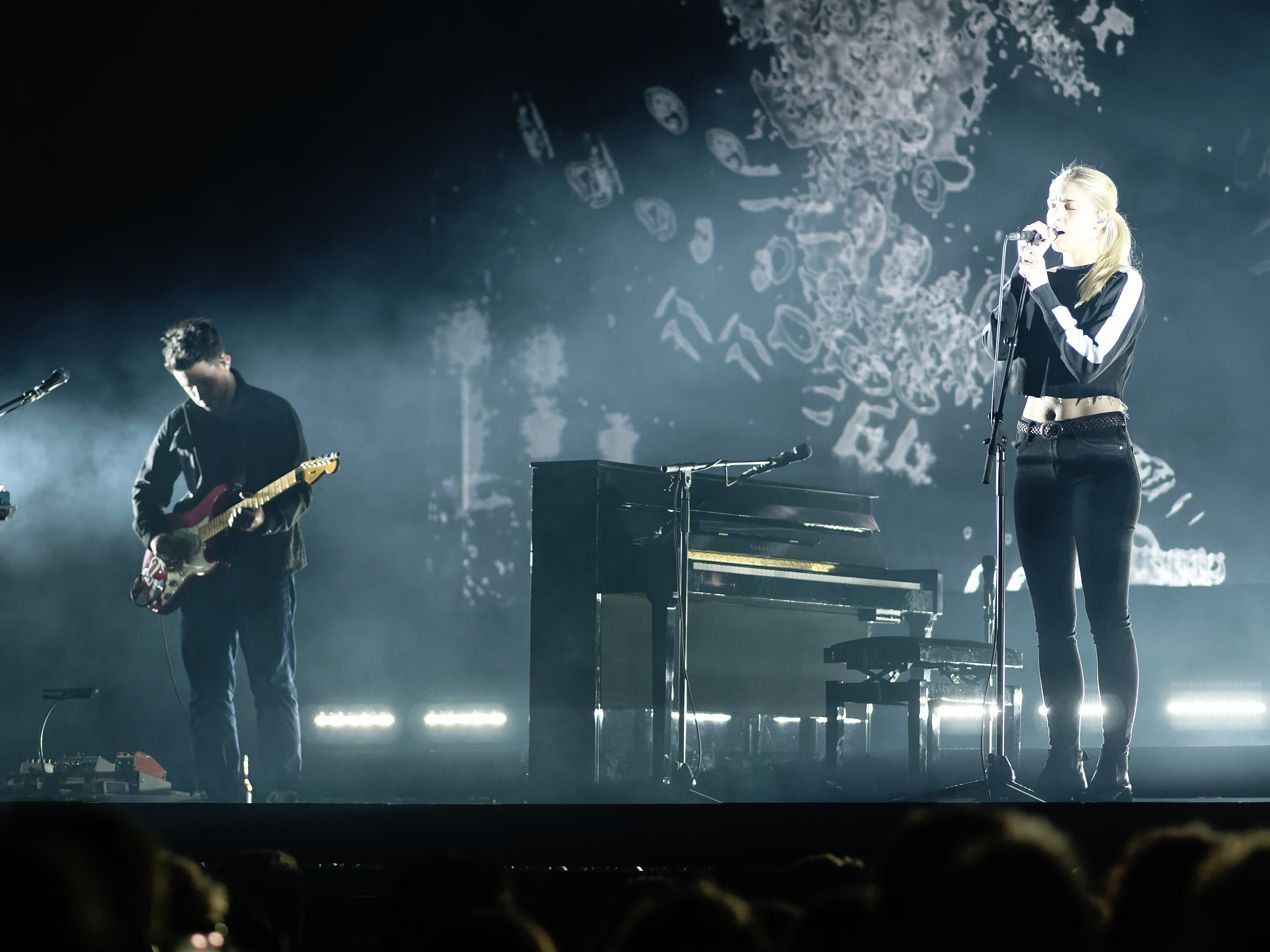
English band London Grammar won Best Song, Musically and Lyrically.

The 59th Ivor Novello Awards were presented on May 22, 2014, at the Grosvenor House, London.

Category	Recipient and nominees
Album Award	**Push the Sky Away – Written by Nick Cave and Warren Ellis; Performed by Nick Cave and the Bad Seeds**; AM – Written by Alex Turner; Performed by Arctic Monkeys; Sing to the Moon – Written and performed by Laura Mvula
Best Contemporary Song	**"Retrograde" – Written and performed by James Blake**; "Kemosabe" – Written by Jonathan Higgs, Jeremy Pritchard, Alexander Robertshaw and Michael Spearman; Performed by Everything Everything; "Latch" – Written by Guy Lawrence, Howard Lawrence, James Napier and Sam Smith; Performed by Disclosure featuring Sam Smith
Best Original Film Score	**The Epic of Everest – Composed by Simon Fisher Turner**; Captain Phillips – Composed by Henry Jackman; Gravity – Composed by Steven Price
Best Song Musically and Lyrically	**"Strong" – Written by Dominic Major, Hannah Reid and Daniel Rothman; Performed by London Grammar**; "Best of Friends" – Written by Will Doyle, Sam Fryer, Chilli Jesson and Pete Mayhew; Performed by Palma Violets; "Love Me Again" – Written by John Newman and Steve Booker; Performed by John Newman
Best Television Soundtrack	**Ripper Street – Composed by Dominik Scherrer**; Mr Selfridge – Composed by Charlie Mole; The Thirteenth Tale – Composed by Benjamin Wallfisch
International Achievement	**Mumford & Sons (Marcus Mumford, Ben Lovett, Ted Dwane and Winston Marshall)**
Lifetime Achievement	**Christine McVie**
Outstanding Song Collection	**The Chemical Brothers**
PRS for Music Most Performed Work	**"Let Her Go" – Written by Mike Rosenberg; Performed by Passenger**; "Clown" – Written by Shahid 'Naughty Boy' Khan, Grant Mitchell and Emeli Sandé; Performed by Emeli Sandé; "Troublemaker" – Written by Claude Kelly, Oliver Murs and Steve Robson; Performed by Olly Murs
PRS for Music Outstanding Contribution to British Music	**Jeff Beck**
PRS for Music Special Achievement Award	**Nile Rodgers**
Songwriter of the Year	**Tom Odell**
The Ivors Classical Music Award	**John McCabe**
The Ivors Inspiration Award	**Jerry Dammers**

=== 2015 ===
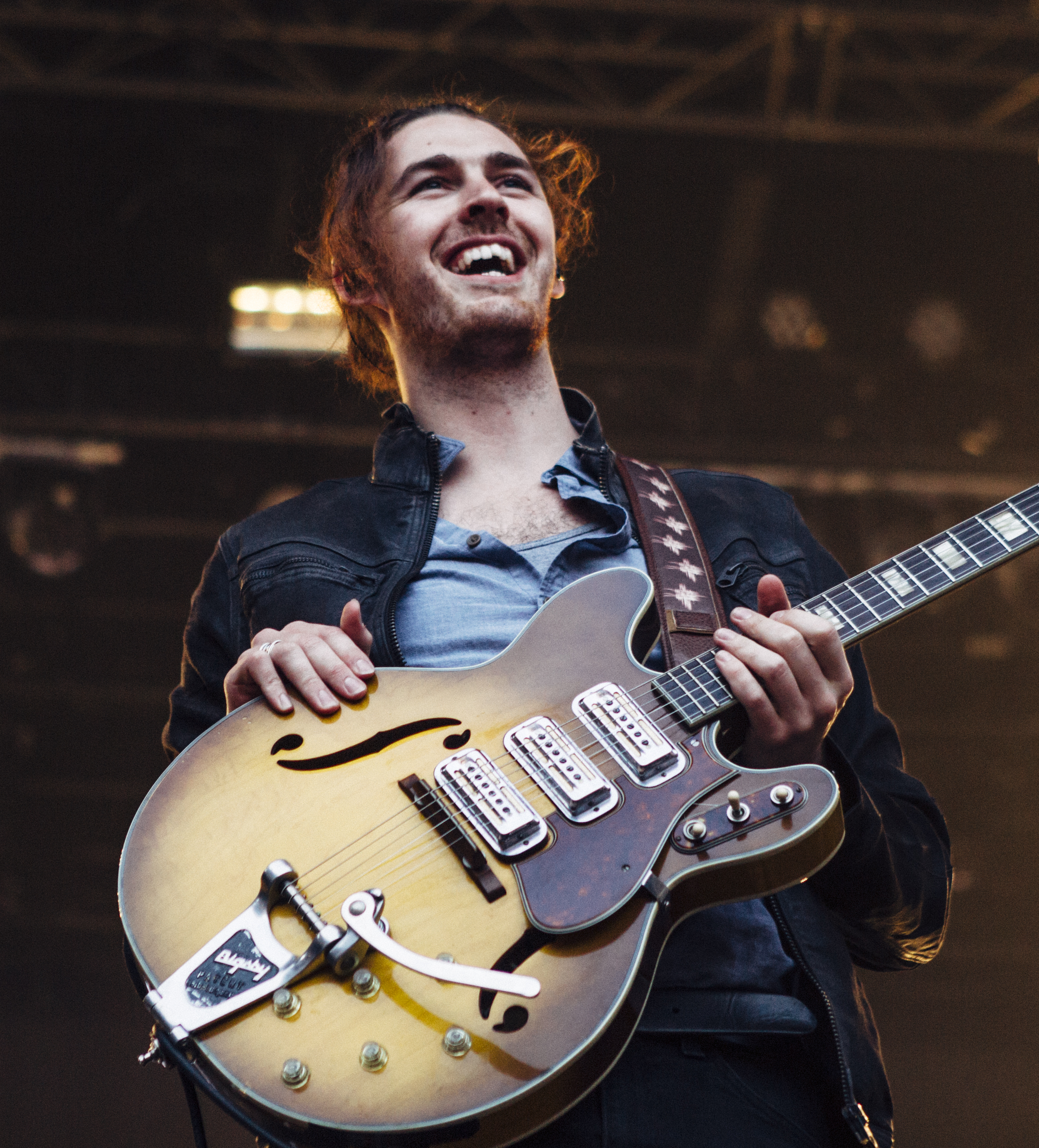
Hozier won Best Song, Musically and Lyrically.

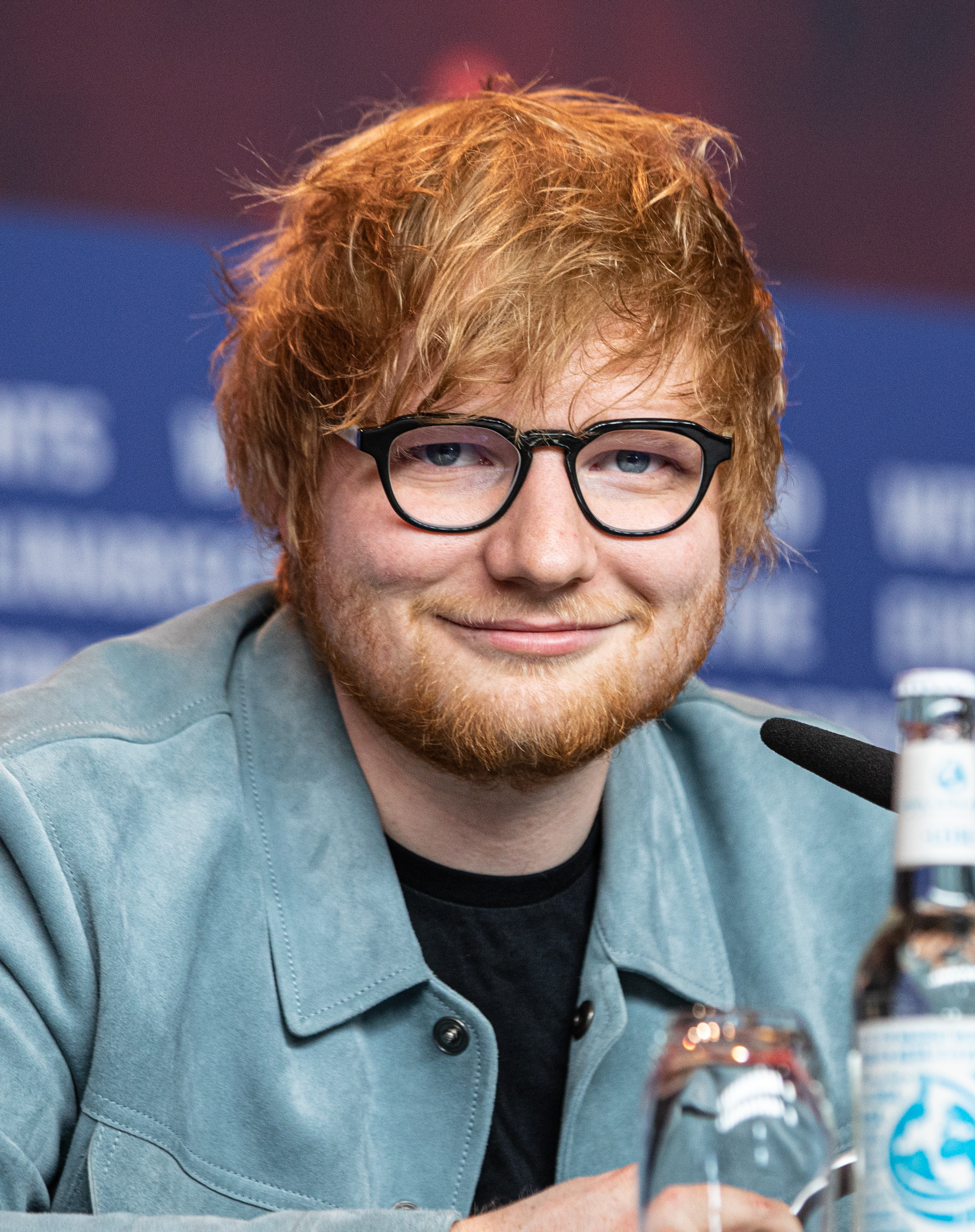
Ed Sheeran won Songwriter of the Year.

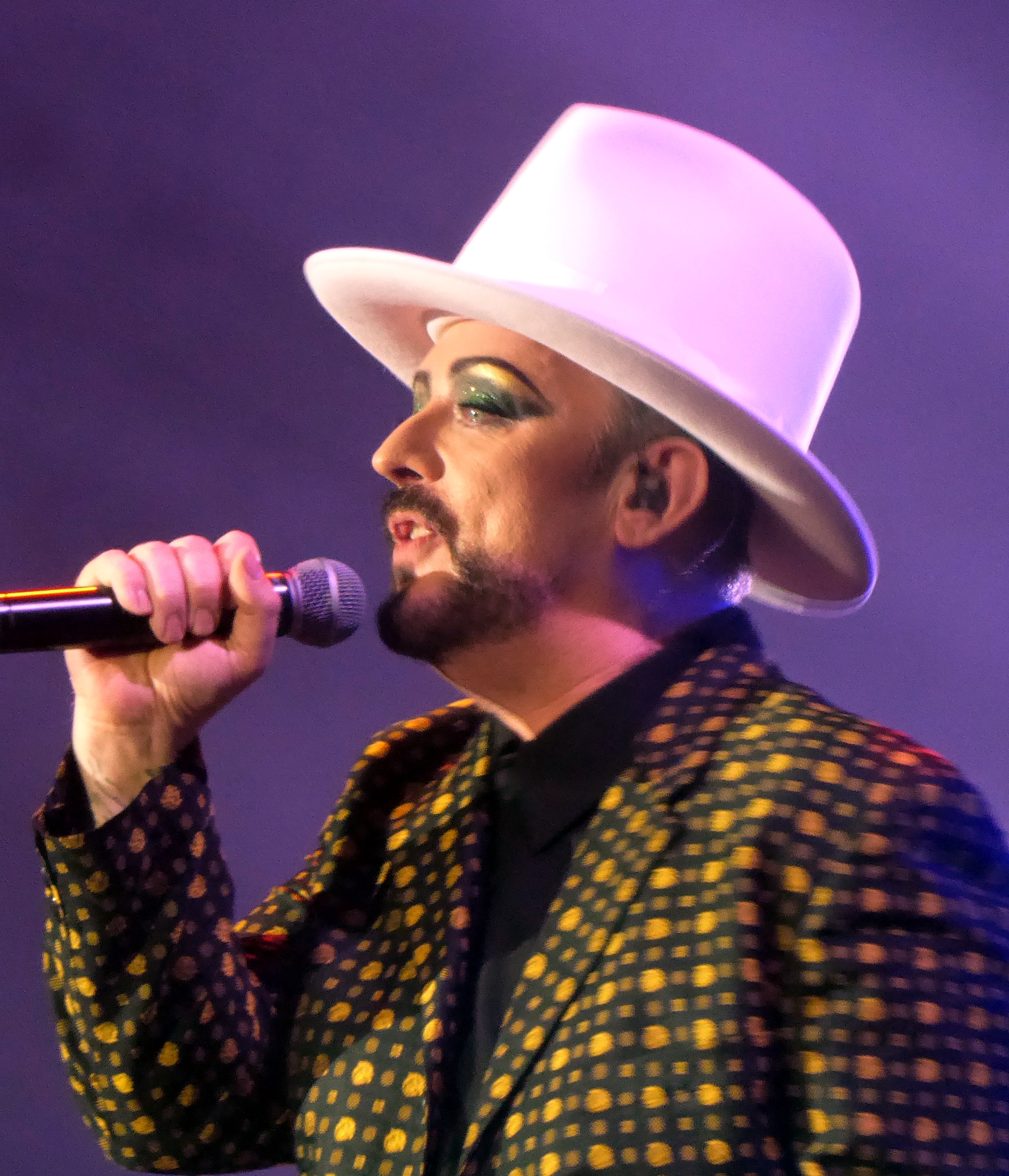
Boy George received the Award for Outstanding Contribution to British Music.

The 60th Ivor Novello Awards were presented on May 21, 2015, at the Grosvenor House, London.

Category	Recipient and nominees
Album Award	**So Long, See You Tomorrow – Written by Jack Steadman; Performed by Bombay Bicycle Club**; Present Tense – Written by Thomas Fleming, Ben Little, Christopher Talbot and Hayden Thorpe; Performed by Wild Beasts; Royal Blood – Written by Michael Kerr and Ben Thatcher; Performed by Royal Blood
Best Contemporary Song	**"Rather Be" – Written by James Napier and Jack Patterson; Performed by Clean Bandit featuring Jess Glynne**; "Every Other Freckle" – Written by Thomas Green, Joe Newman and Gus Unger-Hamilton; Performed by alt-j; "Two Weeks" – Written by Tahliah Debrett Barnett and Emile Haynie; Performed by FKA twigs
Best Original Film Score	**'71 – Composed by David Holmes**; Mr. Turner – Composed by Gary Yershon; The Boxtrolls – Composed by Dario Marianelli
Best Song Musically and Lyrically	**"Take Me to Church" – Written by Andrew Hozier-Byrne; Performed by Hozier**; "Above the Clouds of Pompeii" – Written by Andrew Davie; Performed by Bear's Den; "I Forget Where We Were" – Written and performed by Ben Howard
Best Television Soundtrack	**The Honourable Woman – Composed by Natalie Holt and Martin Phipps**; The Mill (Series 2) – Composed by Samuel Sim; The Suspicions of Mr Whicher: Beyond the Pale – Composed by Edmund Butt
Lifetime Achievement	**Black Sabbath (Tony Iommi, Bill Ward, Geezer Butler and Ozzy Osbourne)**
Outstanding Song Collection	**Albert Hammond**
PRS for Music Most Performed Work	**"Rather Be" – Written by James Napier and Jack Patterson; Performed by Clean Bandit featuring Jess Glynne**; "Budapest" – Written by George Ezra Barnett and Joel Pott; Performed by George Ezra; "Stay with Me" – Written by James Napier, William Phillips and Sam Smith; Performed by Sam Smith
PRS for Music Outstanding Contribution to British Music	**Boy George**
PRS for Music Special International Award	**Paul Williams**
Songwriter of the Year	**Ed Sheeran**
The Ivors Classical Music Award	**Judith Weir**
The Ivors Inspiration Award	**Manic Street Preachers (James Dean Bradfield, Nicky Wire and Sean Moore)**
The Ivors Special Anniversary Award	**Bob Geldof and Midge Ure**

=== 2016 ===
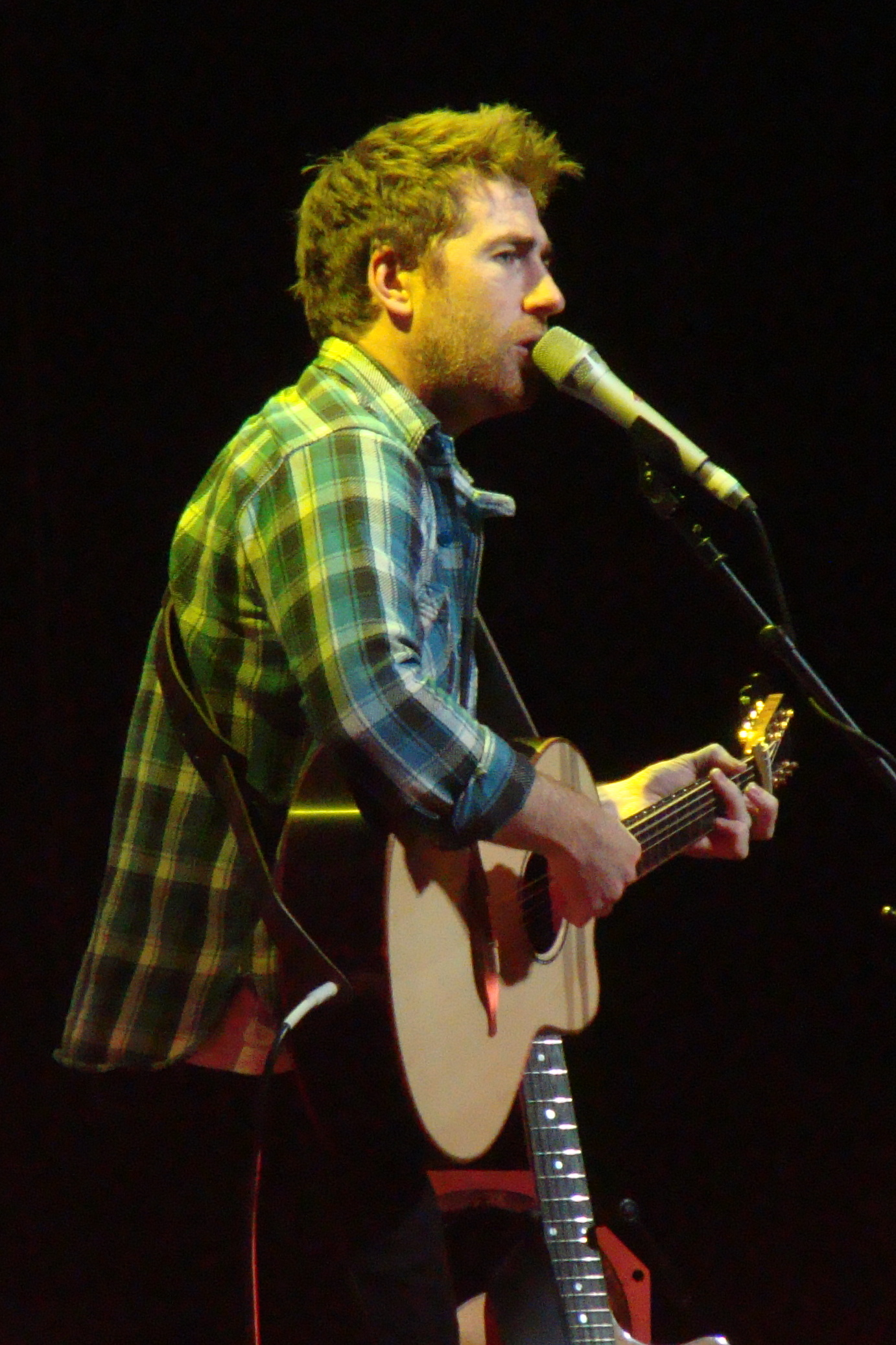
Jamie Lawson won Best Song, Musically and Lyrically.

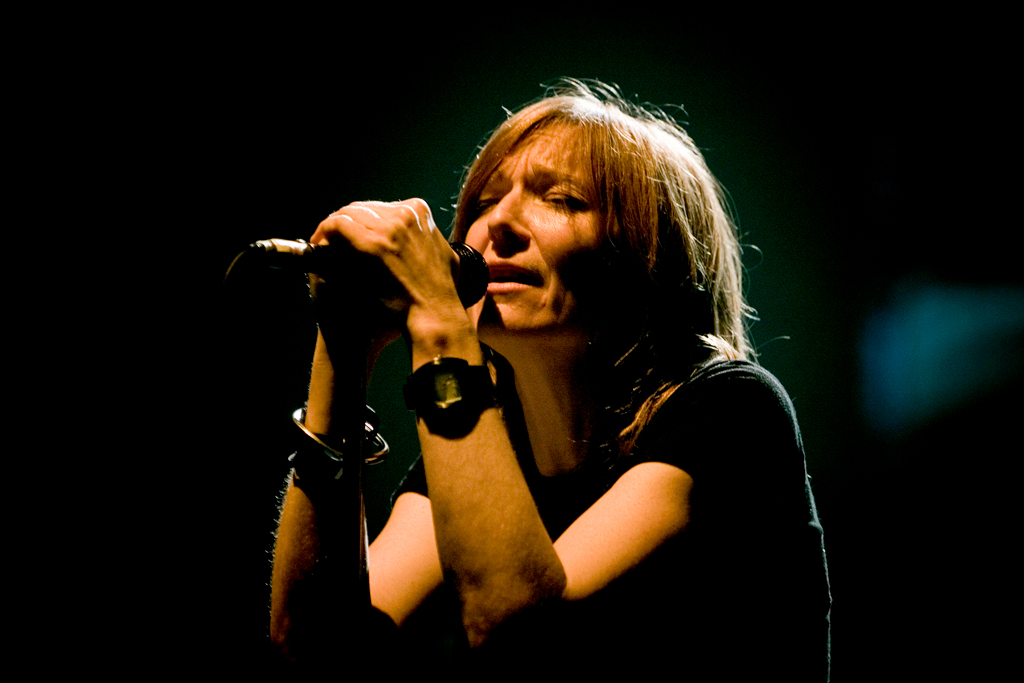
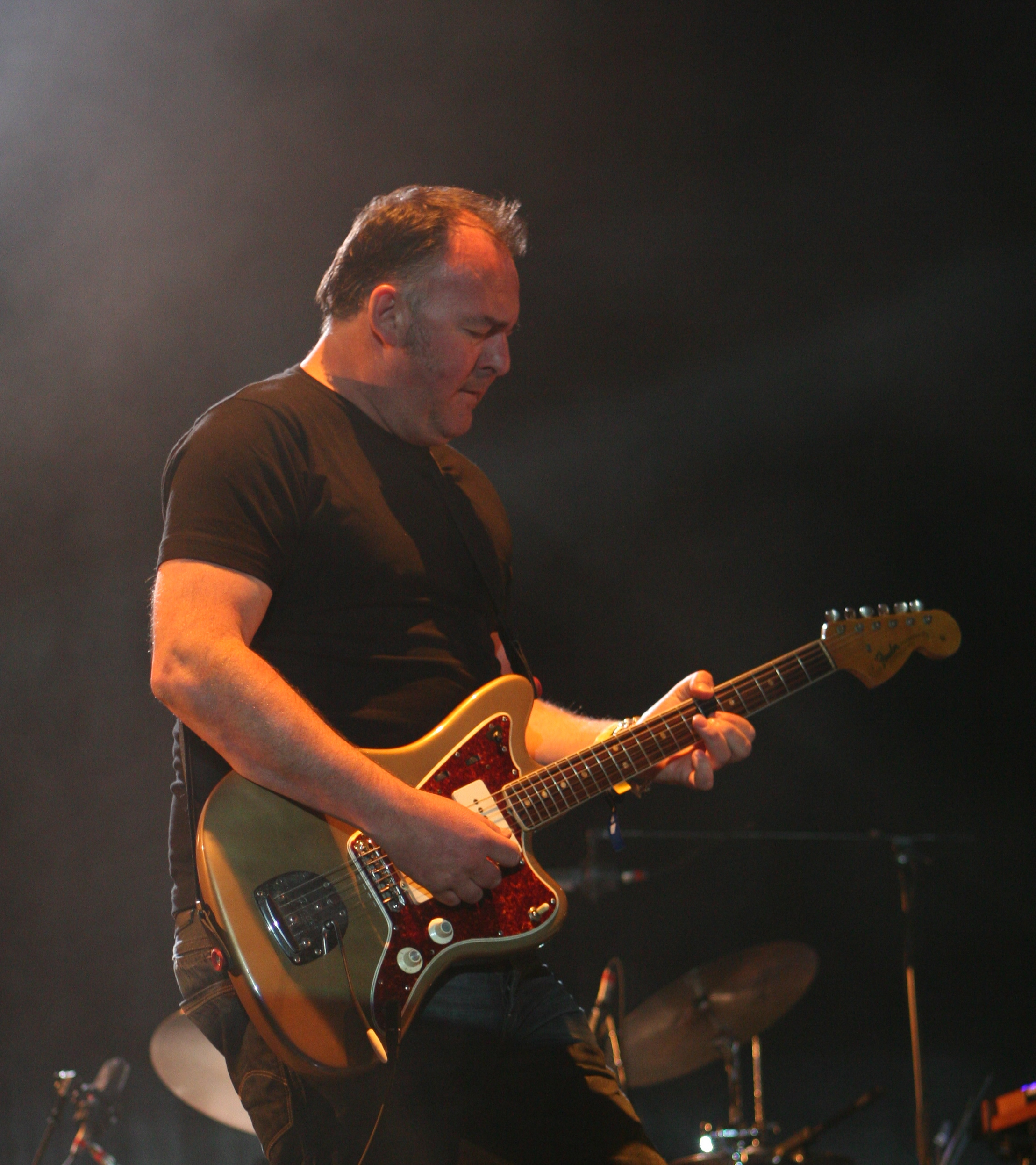

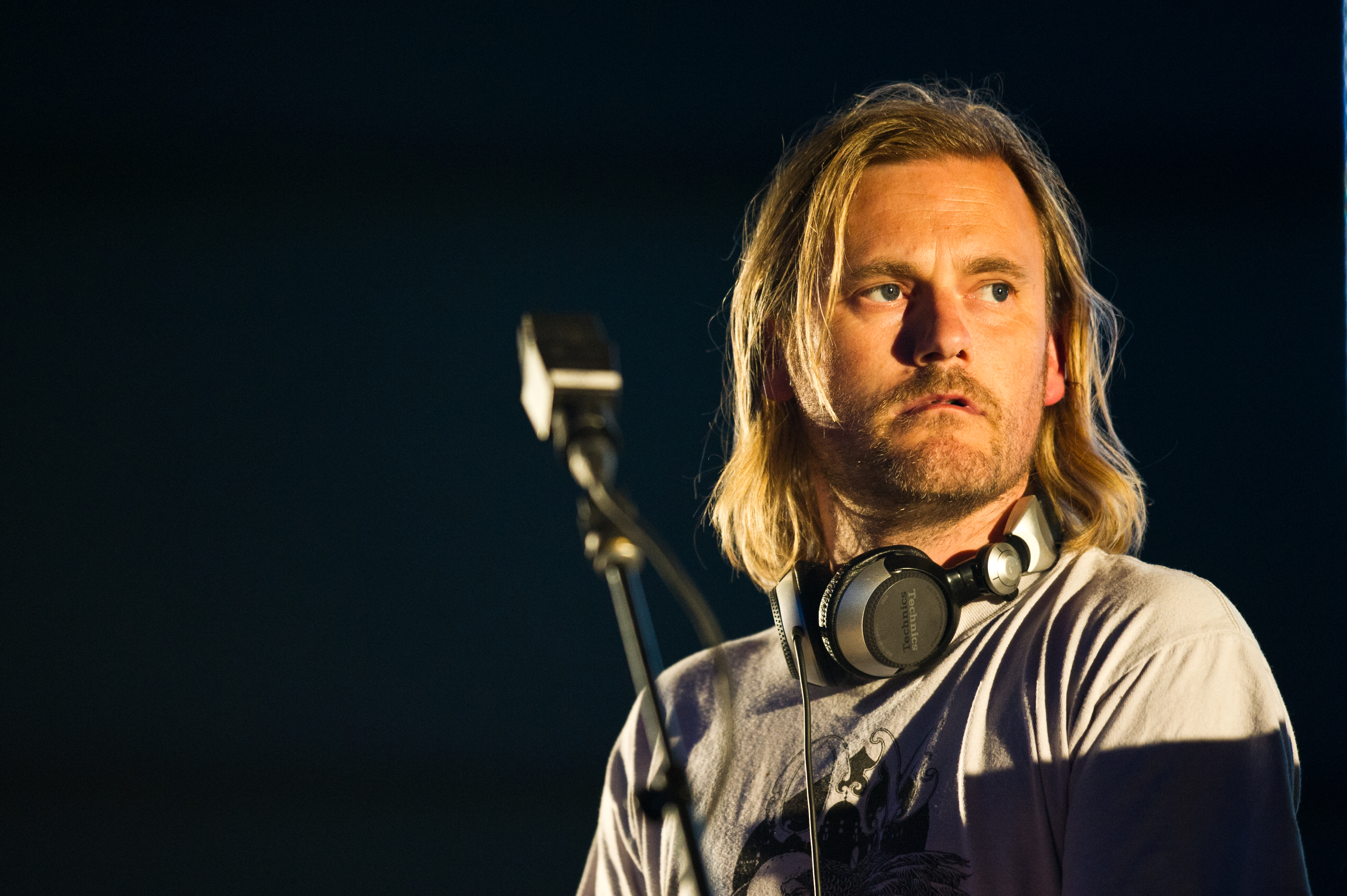
Beth Gibbons (top), Adrian Utley (center) and Geoff Barrow (bottom) from the band Portishead received the Outstanding Contribution to British Music award.

The 61st Ivor Novello Awards took place on May 19, 2016, at the Grosvenor House, Park Lane, London.

Category	Recipient and nominees
Album Award	**Darling Arithmetic – Written by Conor O'Brien; Performed by Villagers**; In Colour – Written and performed by Jamie xx; Matador – Written and performed by Gaz Coombes
Best Contemporary Song	**"All My Friends" – Written by James Carter, Oliver Lee, Cass Lowe and Chance the Rapper; Performed by Snakehips featuring Tinashe and Chance the Rapper**; "Cargo" – Written by FRED and Roots Manuva; Performed by Roots Manuva; "Shutdown" – Written by Ragz Originale and Skepta; Performed by Skepta
Best Original Film Score	**Ex Machina – Composed by Ben Salisbury and Geoff Barrow**; Pan – Composed by John Powell; The Duke of Burgundy – Composed by Faris Badwan and Rachel Zeffira
Best Song Musically and Lyrically	**"Wasn't Expecting That" – Written and performed by Jamie Lawson**; "Bloodstream" – Written by Piers Aggett, Kesi Dryden, Amir Izadkhah, Gary Lightbody, Johnny McDaid, Leon Rolle and Ed Sheeran; Performed by Ed Sheeran; "Bros" – Written by Ellie Rowsell; Performed by Wolf Alice
Best Television Soundtrack	**London Spy – Composed by Keefus Ciancia and David Holmes**; And Then There Were None – Composed by Stuart Earl; From Darkness – Composed by Edmund Butt
International Achievement	**Wayne Hector**
Lifetime Achievement	**Damon Albarn**
Outstanding Song Collection	**Simple Minds (Charlie Burchill, Derek Forbes, Jim Kerr and Mick MacNeil)**
PRS for Music Most Performed Work	**"Hold Back the River" – Written by Iain Archer and James Bay; Performed by James Bay**; "Hold My Hand" – Written by Janée 'Jin Jin' Bennett, Jess Glynne and Jack Patterson; Performed by Jess Glynne; "King" – Written by Michael Goldsworthy, Mark Ralph, Oliver Thornton and Emre Turkmen; Performed by Years & Years
PRS for Music Outstanding Contribution to British Music	**Portishead (Beth Gibbons, Geoff Barrow and Adrian Utley)**
PRS for Music Special International Award	**Bryan Adams**
Songwriter of the Year	**Adele**
The Ivors Classical Music Award	**Oliver Knussen**
The Ivors Inspiration Award	**Happy Mondays (Mark Day, Paul Ryder, Paul Davis, Shaun Ryder and Gary Whelan)**

=== 2017 ===
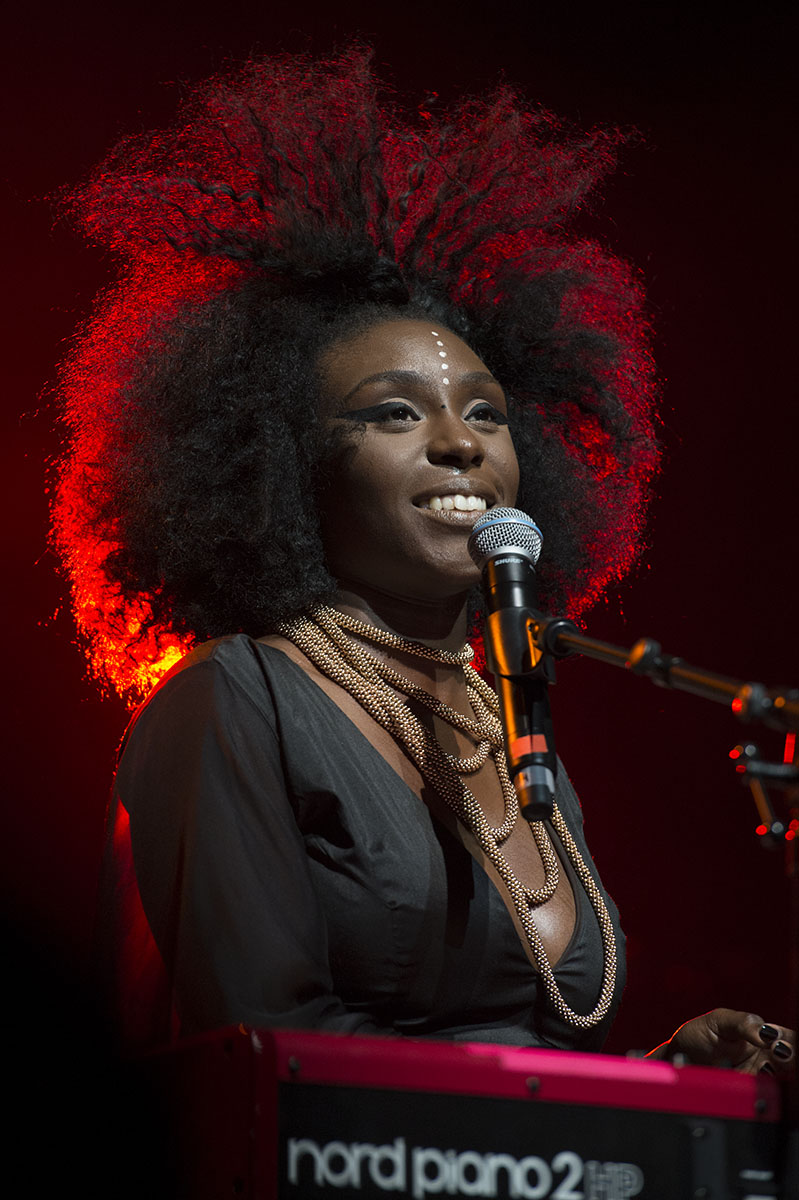
Laura Mvula won the Album Award.

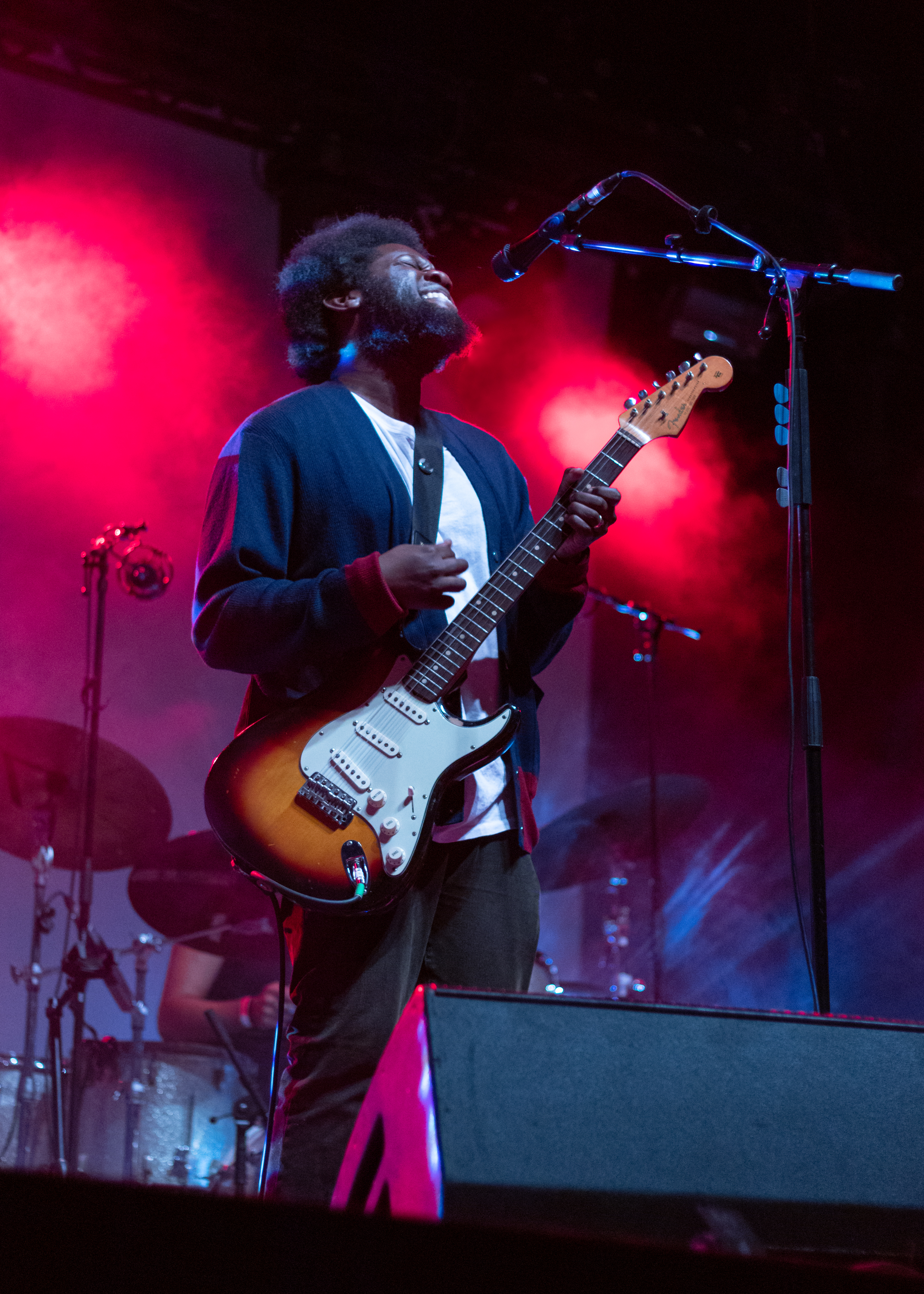
Michael Kiwanuka won Best Song, Musically and Lyrically.

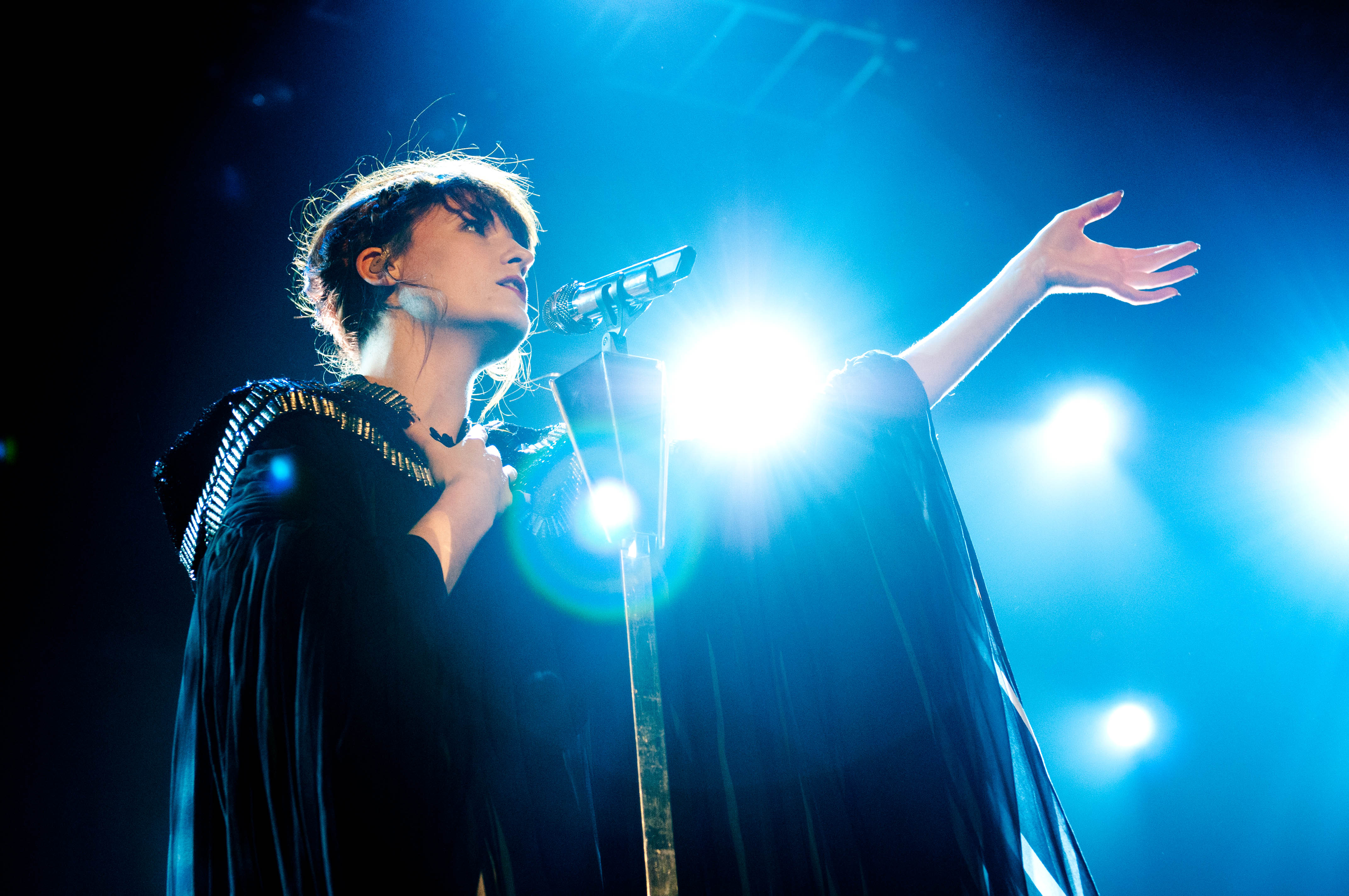
Florence Welch won the International Achievement Award.

The 62nd Ivor Novello Awards were presented on May 18, 2017, at the Grosvenor House, Park Lane, London.

Category	Recipient and nominees
Album Award	**The Dreaming Room – Written and performed by Laura Mvula**; Love & Hate – Written by Brian Burton, Dean 'Inflo' Josiah Cover and Michael Kiwanuka; Performed by Michael Kiwanuka; Skeleton Tree – Written by Nick Cave and Warren Ellis; Performed by Nick Cave and the Bad Seeds
Best Contemporary Song	**"Man" – Written by Skepta and Josh Homme; Performed by Skepta**; "Love$ick" – Written by A$AP Rocky and Mura Masa; Performed by Mura Masa featuring A$AP Rocky; "Sexual" – Written by Dyo, NEIKED and Elina Stridh; Performed by NEIKED featuring Dyo
Best Original Film Score	**Kubo and the Two Strings – Composed by Dario Marianelli**; High-Rise – Composed by Clint Mansell; My Scientology Movie – Composed by Dan Jones
Best Song Musically and Lyrically	**"Black Man in a White World" – Written by Dean 'Inflo' Joisah Cover and Michael Kiwanuka; Performed by Michael Kiwanuka**; "Overcome" – Written by Laura Mvula and Nile Rodgers; Performed by Laura Mvula; "Telomere" – Written by Blaine Harrison and Henry Harrison; Performed by Mystery Jets
Best Television Soundtrack	**War & Peace – Composed by Martin Phipps**; The Collection – Composed by Dominik Scherrer; The Witness for the Prosecution – Composed by Paul Englishby
International Achievement	**Florence Welch**
Lifetime Achievement	**Nitin Sawhney**
Outstanding Song Collection	**Pulp**
PRS for Music Most Performed Work	**"Hymn for the Weekend" – Written by Guy Berryman, Jonny Buckland, Will Champion and Chris Martin; Performed by Coldplay**; "When We Were Young" – Written by Adele Adkins and Tobias Jesso Jr.; Performed by Adele; "Adventure of a Lifetime" – Written by Guy Berryman, Jonny Buckland, Will Champion and Chris Martin; Performed by Coldplay
PRS for Music Outstanding Contribution to British Music	**Anne Dudley**
PRS for Music Special International Achievement	**Bill Withers**
Songwriter of the Year	**Skepta**
The Ivors Inspiration Award	**Gary Numan**
The Ivors Jazz Award	**John Surman**

=== 2018 ===
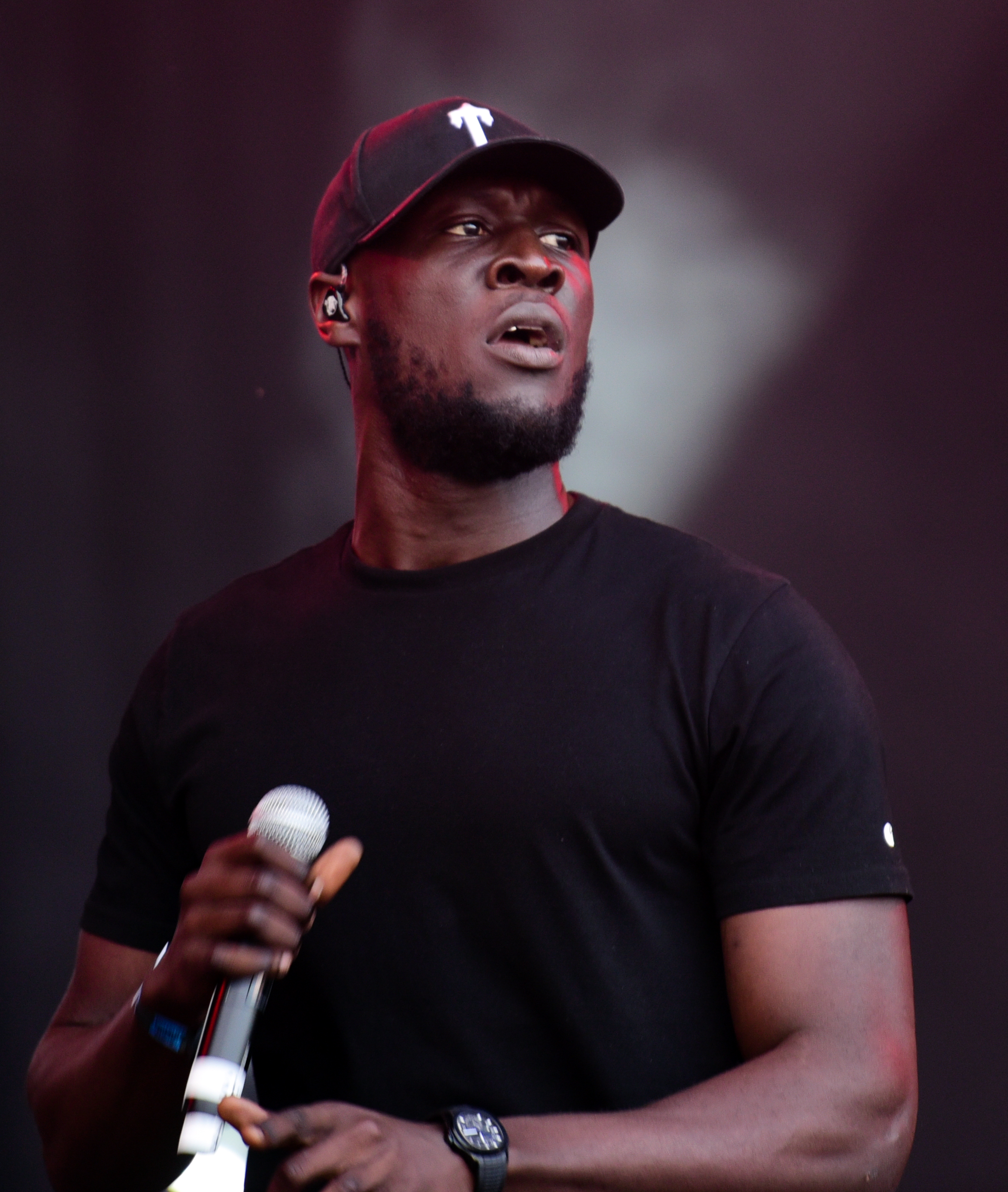
Stormzy won the Album Award.

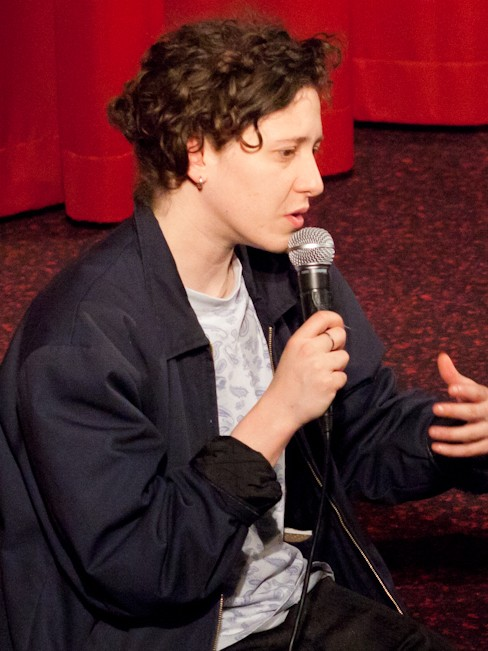
Mica Levi won Best Original Film Score; they also received an Academy Award nomination for the score.

The 63rd Ivor Novello Awards were presented on May 31, 2018, at the Grosvenor House, Park Lane, London.

Category	Recipient and nominees
Album Award	**Gang Signs & Prayer – Written and performed by Stormzy**; A Fever Dream – Written by Jonathan Higgs, Jeremy Pritchard, Alex Robertshaw and Michael Spearman; Performed by Everything Everything; Moonshine Freeze – Written by Kate Stables; Performed by This Is the Kit
Best Contemporary Song	**"Question Time" – Written by Dave and Fraser T. Smith; Performed by Dave**; "Cola" – Written by Michael di Scala, Alexander Kotz and Dave Whelan; Performed by CamelPhat and Elderbrook; "Don't Cry for Me" – Written by Michael 'Stormzy' Omari, Varren Wade and Wizzy Wow; Performed by Stormzy featuring Raleigh Ritchie
Best Original Film Score	**Jackie – Composed by Mica Levi**; It – Composed by Benjamin Wallfisch; Paddington 2 – Composed by Dario Marianelli
Best Song Musically and Lyrically	**"Magnificent (She Says)" – Written by Guy Garvey, Craig Potter, Mark Potter and Pete Turner; Performed by Elbow**; "Can't Do" – Written by Jonathan Higgs, Jeremy Pritchard, Alex Robertshaw and Michael Spearman; Performed by Everything Everything; "(No One Knows Me) Like the Piano" – Written and performed by Sampha
Best Television Soundtrack	**The Miniaturist – Composed by Dan Jones**; Babs – Composed by Rob Lane; SS-GB – Composed by Dan Jones
Best Video Game Soundtrack	**Horizon Zero Dawn – Composed by Joris de Man, Joe Henson and Alexis Smith**; Hellblade: Senua's Sacrifice – Composed by David Garcia Diaz and Andy LaPlegua; Life Is Strange: Before the Storm – Composed by Igor Haefeli and Elena Tonra
International Achievement	**Billy Ocean**
Outstanding Song Collection	**Cathy Dennis**
PRS for Music Most Performed Work	**"Shape of You" – Written by Steve Mac, Johnny McDaid and Ed Sheeran; Performed by Ed Sheeran**; "Human" – Written by Jamie Hartman and Rag'n'Bone Man; Performed by Rag'n'Bone Man; "Castle on the Hill" – Written by Benny Blanco and Ed Sheeran; Performed by Ed Sheeran
PRS for Music Outstanding Contribution to British Music	**Billy Bragg**
Songwriter of the Year	**Ed Sheeran**
The Ivors Inspiration Award	**Shane MacGowan**
PRS for Music Special International Award	**Lionel Richie**
The Ivors Classical Music Award	**Thea Musgrave**

=== 2019 ===
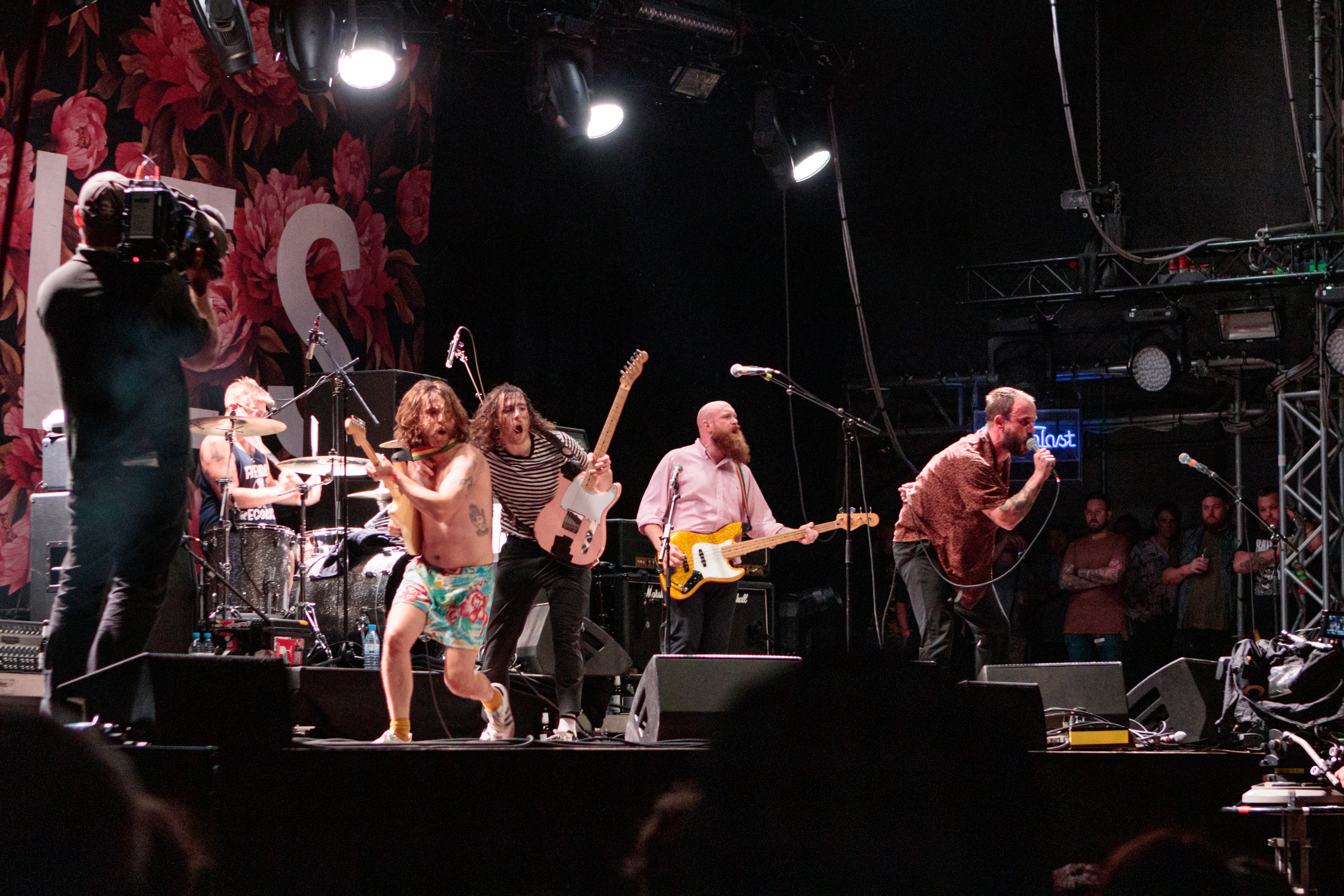
British-Irish band IDLES won the Album Award.

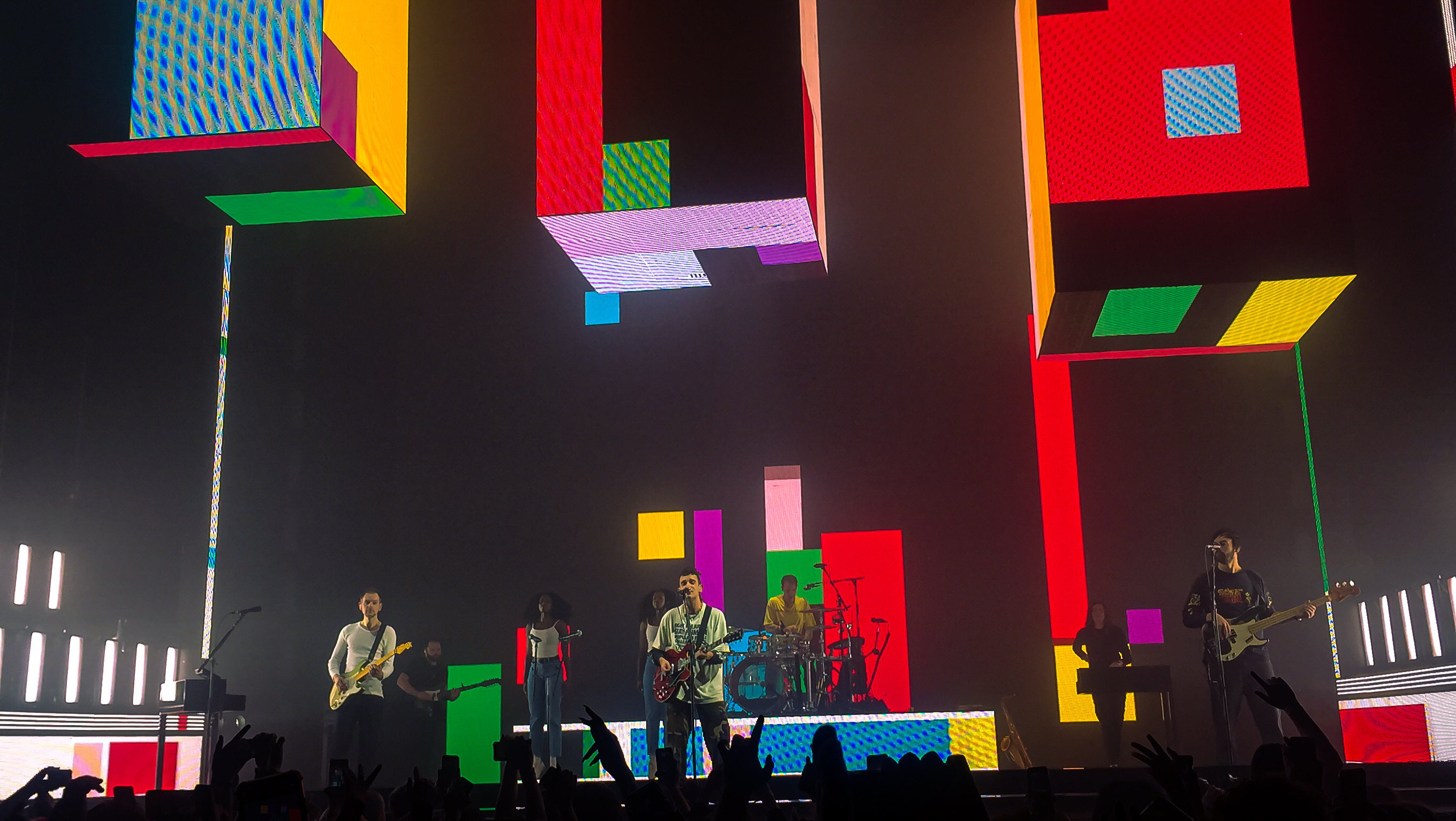
English band The 1975 won Best Contemporary Song as well as the Songwriter of the Year award.

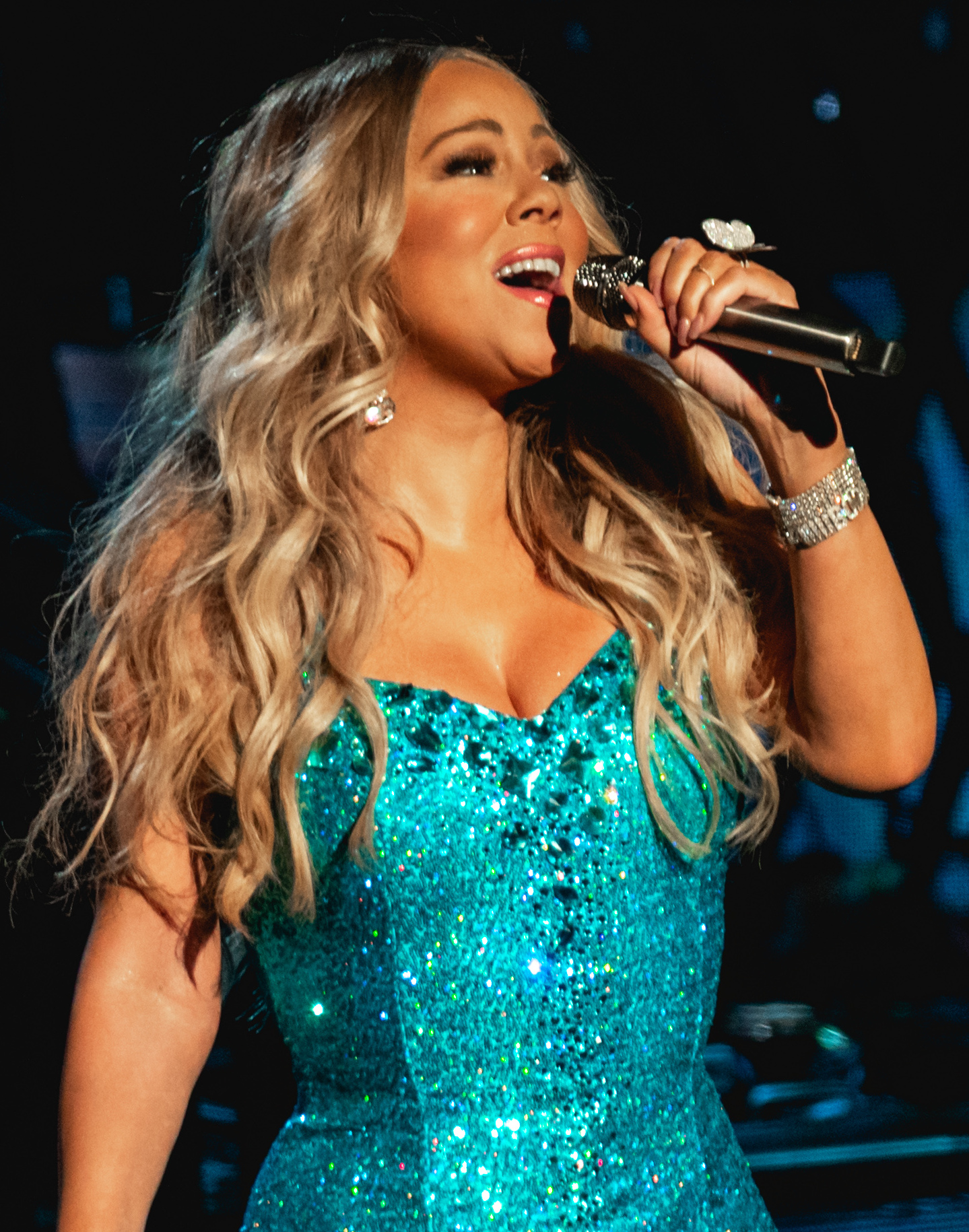
Mariah Carey received the Special International Award.

The 64th Ivors Novello Awards were presented on May 23, 2019, at the Grosvenor House, Park Lane, London.

Category	Recipient and nominees
Album Award	**Joy as an Act of Resistance – Written by Jonathan Beavis, Mark Bowen, Adam Devonshire, Lee Kiernan and Joseph Talbot; Performed by IDLES**; Cocoa Sugar – Written by Kayus Bankole, Graham Hastings and Alloysious Massaquoi; Performed by Young Fathers; I'm All Ears – Written by Jenny Hollingworth and Rosa Walton; Performed by Let's Eat Grandma
Best Contemporary Song	**"Love It If We Made It" – Written by George Daniel, Adam Hann, Matty Healy and Ross MacDonald; Performed by The 1975**; "Black Rose" – Written by Ghetts, Kojey Radical, Daniel Miles, JoJo Mukeza and Jaime Naldo Menezes; Performed by Ghetts featuring Kojey Radical; "Blue Lights" – Written by Guy Bonnet, Dizzee Rascal, Roland Romanelli and Jorja Smith; Performed by Jorja Smith
Best Original Film Score	**Phantom Thread – Composed by Jonny Greenwood**; American Animals – Composed by Anne Nikitin; Spider-Man: Into the Spider-Verse – Composed by Daniel Pemberton
Best Original Video Game Score	**Sea of Thieves – Composed by Robin Beanland**; Assassin's Creed Odyssey – Composed by Michael Georgiades, Joe Henson and Alexis Smith; Q.U.B.E. 2 – Composed by David Housden
Best Song Musically and Lyrically	**"Nica Libres at Dusk" – Written and performed by Ben Howard**; "Four Out of Five" – Written by Alex Turner; Performed by Arctic Monkeys; "Nina Cried Power" – Written and performed by Hozier
Best Television Soundtrack	**Requiem – Composed by Natasha Khan and Dominik Scherrer**; Flowers (Series 2) – Composed by Arthur Sharpe; Happy New Year, Colin Burstead – Composed by Clint Mansell
International Achievement	**Deep Purple (Ritchie Blackmore, Ian Gillan, Roger Glover, Jon Lord and Ian Paice)**
Outstanding Song Collection	**Dido**
PRS for Music Most Performed Work	**"These Days" – Written by Julian Bunetta, Dan Caplen, Macklemore, John Ryan and Jamie Scott; Performed by Rudimental featuring Jess Glynne, Macklemore and Dan Caplen**; "Breathe" – Written and performed by Jax Jones and Ina Wroldsen; "Shotgun" – Written by George Ezra Barnett, FRED and Joel Pott; Performed by George Ezra
PRS for Music Outstanding Contribution to British Music	**Richard Ashcroft**
PRS for Music Special International Award	**Mariah Carey**
Songwriter of the Year	**The 1975 (Matty Healy, Adam Hann, Ross MacDonald and George Daniel)**
The Ivors Inspiration Award	**Wiley**
The Ivors Jazz Award	**Django Bates**
Best Chamber Ensemble Composition	**Flute Concerto - Composed by Dai Fujikura**
Best Choral Composition	**Pocket Universe** **- Composed by Geoff Hannan**
Best Orchestral Composition	**The Book of Miracles (Trombone Concerto)** - **Composed by Gavin Higgins**
Best Small Chamber Composition	**Leafleoht - Composed by James Weeks**

== 2020s ==
=== 2020 ===
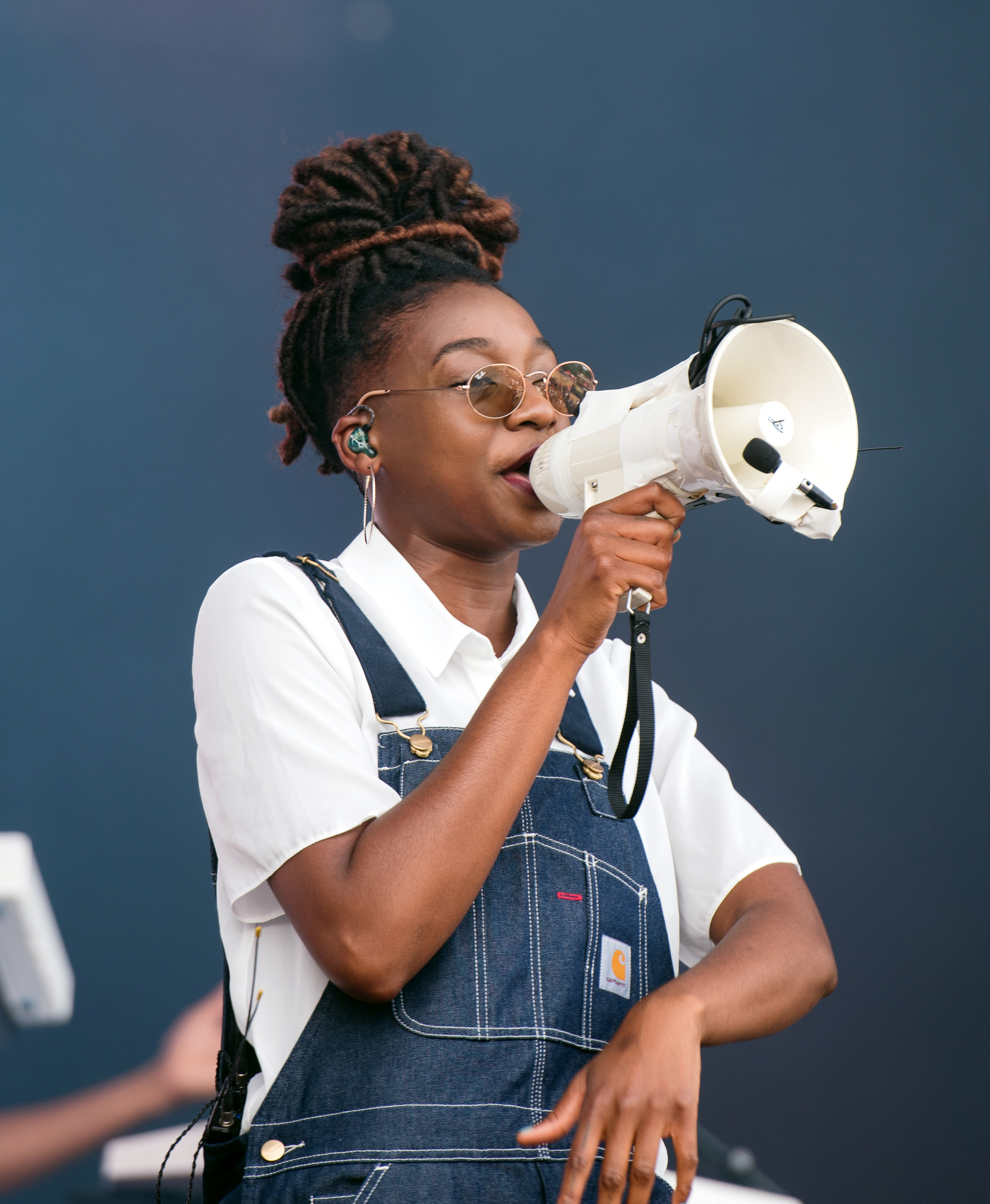
Little Simz won the Album Award.

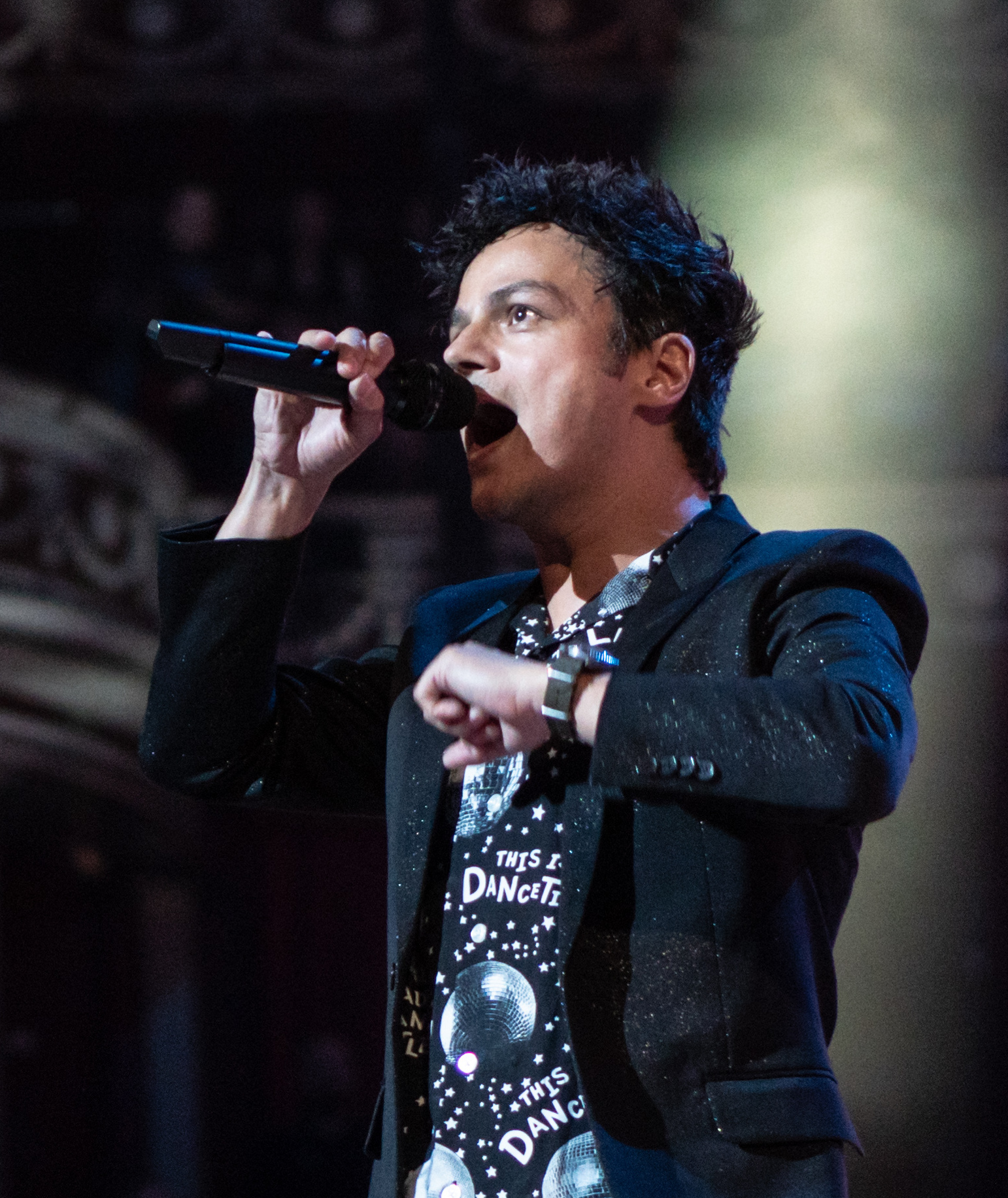
Jamie Cullum won Best Song, Musically and Lyrically.

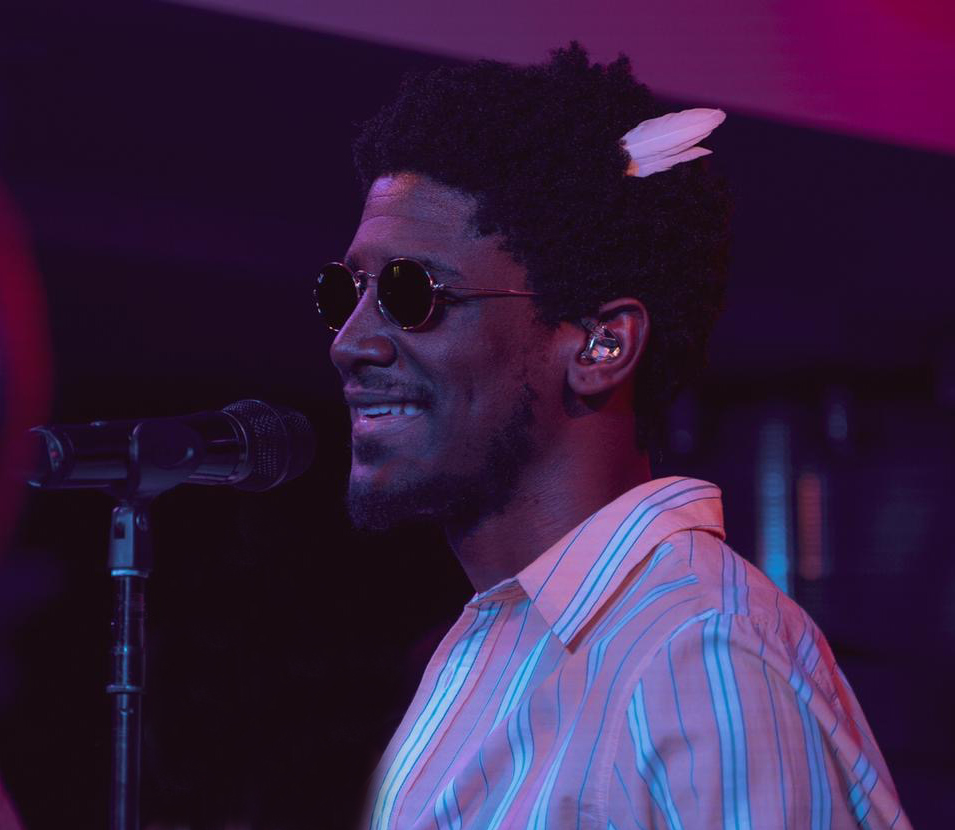
Labrinth won Best Television Soundtrack.

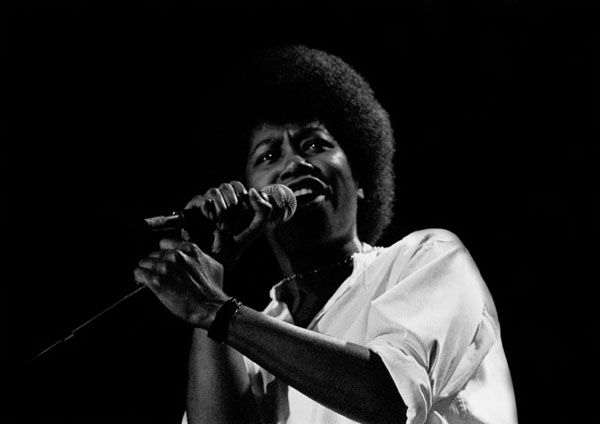
Joan Armatrading received the Academy Fellowship and won Songwriter of the Year.

The 65th Ivors took place on September 2, 2020, on Apple Music 1 hosted by Matt Wilkinson.

Category	Recipient and nominees
Academy Fellowship	**Joan Armatrading**
Album Award	**GREY Area – Written by Inflo and Little Simz; Performed by Little Simz**; Ghosteen – Written by Nick Cave and Warren Ellis; Performed by Nick Cave and the Bad Seeds; The Book of Traps and Lessons – Written by Kae Tempest and Dan Carey; Performed by Kae Tempest
Best Contemporary Song	**"Black" – Written by Dave and Fraser T. Smith; Performed by Dave**; "Firesmoke" – Written by Kae Tempest and Dan Carey; Performed by Kae Tempest; "Must Be" – Written by JAE5 and J Hus; Performed by J Hus
Best Original Film Score	**Midsommar – Composed by Bobby Krlic**; For Sama – Composed by Nainita Desai; Monos – Composed by Mica Levi
Best Original Video Game Score	**Draugen – Composed by Simon Poole**; Arise: A Simple Story – Composed by David Garcia Diaz; Lost Ember – Composed by Dorian Behner, John Broomhall and Will Morton
Best Song Musically and Lyrically	**"Age of Anxiety" – Written and performed by Jamie Cullum**; "Crown" – Written by MJ Cole, Jimmy Napes and Stormzy; Performed by Stormzy; "Dead Boys" – Written and performed by Sam Fender
Best Television Soundtrack	**Euphoria (Original Score from the HBO Series) – Composed by Labrinth**; Rise of the Nazis – Composed by Tom Hodge; The Crown (Series 3) – Composed by Martin Phipps
PRS for Music Most Performed Work	**"Giant" – Written by Calvin Harris, Jamie Hartman, Rag'n'Bone Man and Troy Miller; Performed by Calvin Harris and Rag'n'Bone Man**; "Dancing with a Stranger" – Written by Mikkel Eriksen, Tor Erik Hermansen, Jimmy Napes and Sam Smith; Performed by Sam Smith and Normani; "Higher Love" – Written by Will Jennings and Steve Winwood; Performed by Kygo and Whitney Houston; "Hold Me While You Wait" – Written by Lewis Capaldi, Jamie N Commons and Jamie Hartman; Performed by Lewis Capaldi; "Someone You Loved" – Written by Thomas Barnes, Lewis Capaldi, Peter Kelleher, Benjamin Kohn and Sam Roman; Performed by Lewis Capaldi
Rising Star Award	**Mysie**; Amahla; Carmel Smickersgill; Griff; Lullahush
Songwriter of the Year	**Joan Armatrading**
Best Chamber Orchestral Composition	**Grin - Composed by Robin Haigh**
Best Choral Composition	**Pietá - Composed by Richard Blackford**
Best Large Chamber Composition	**Honey Siren - Composed by Oliver Leith**
Large Orchestral Composition	**Horror Vacui - Composed by Jonny Greenwood**
Best Small Chamber Composition	**Six Movements - Composed by Daniel Fardon**

=== 2021 ===
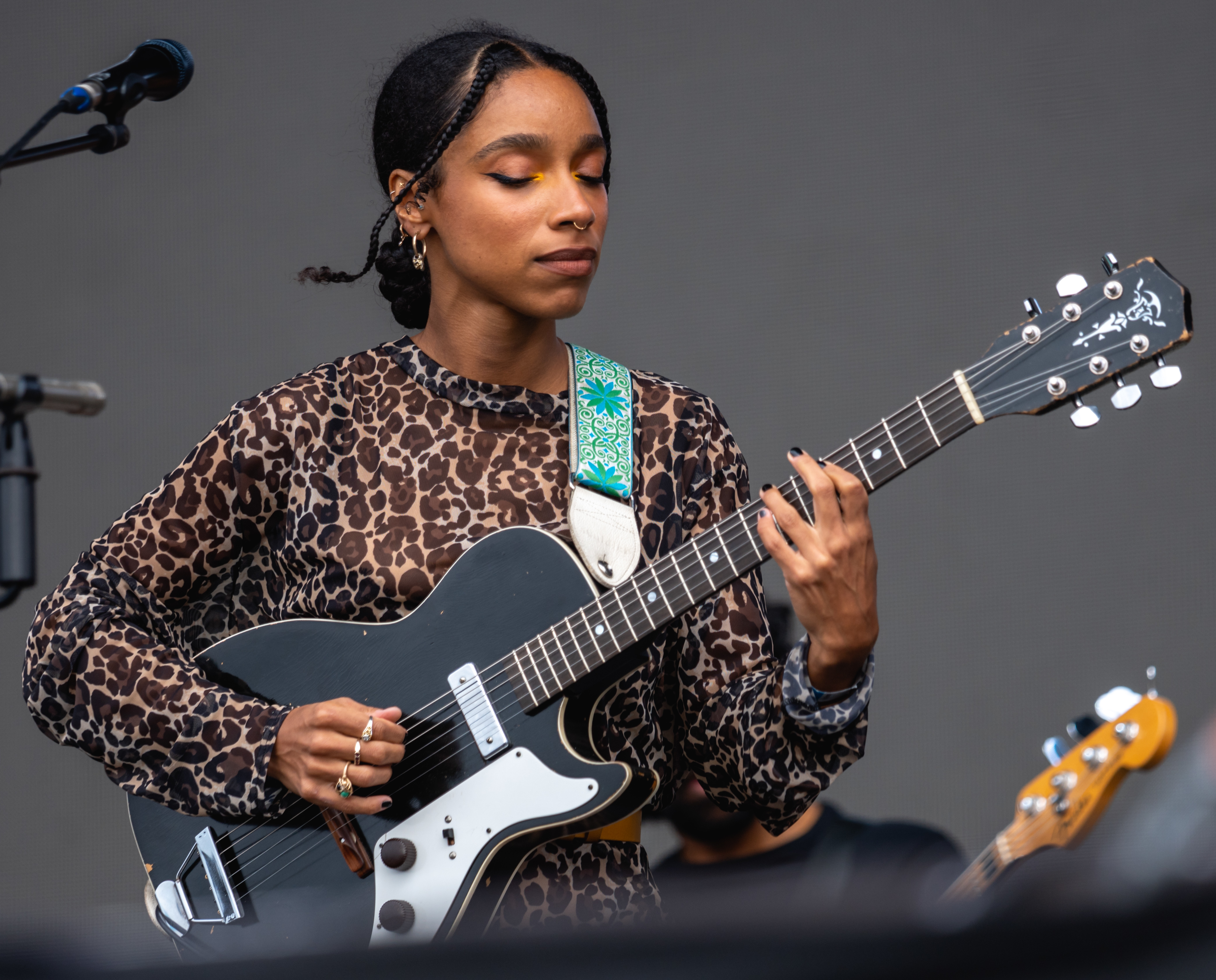
Lianne La Havas won the Album Award.

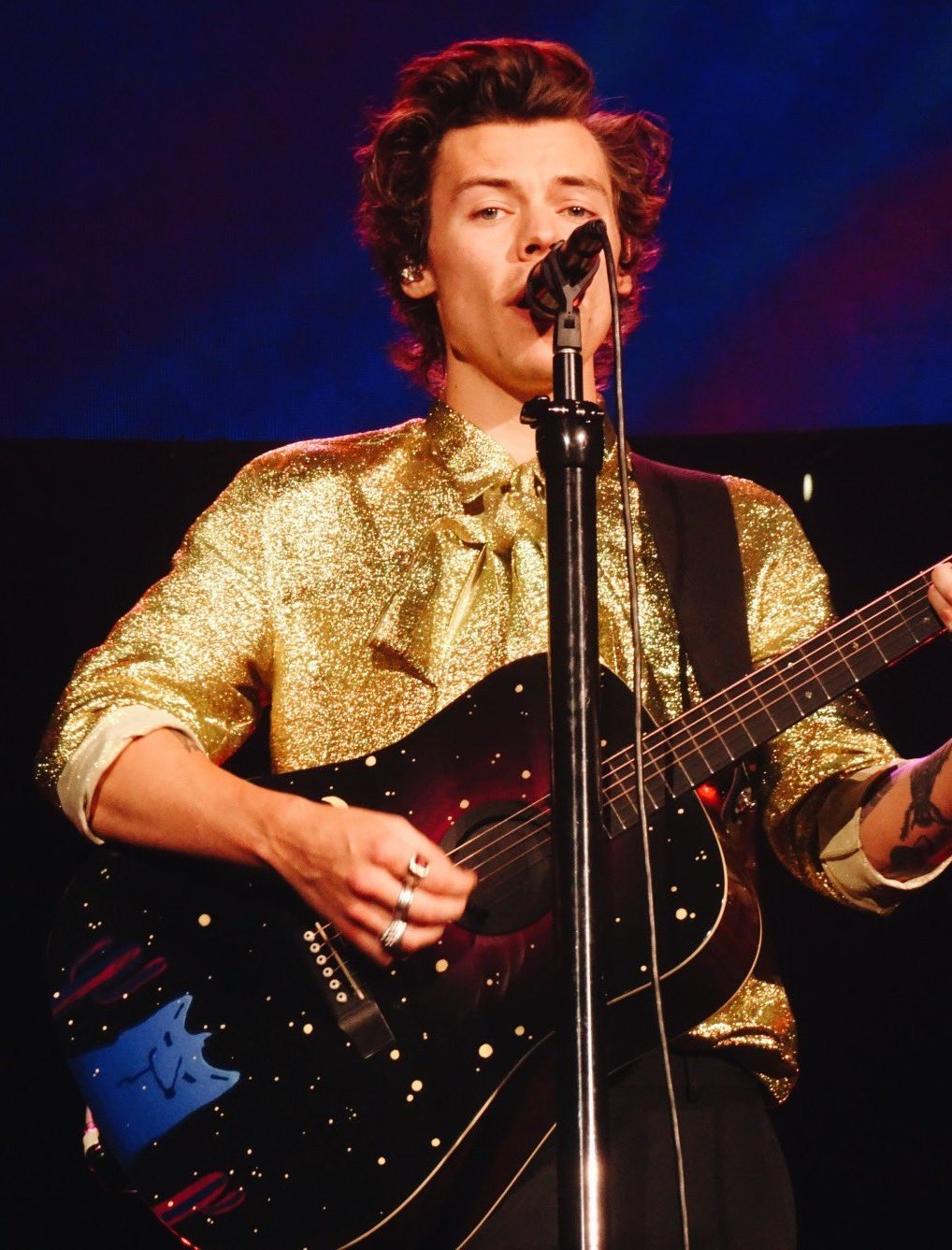
Harry Styles won Most Performed Work alongside Amy Allen, Tyler Johnson and Kid Harpoon.

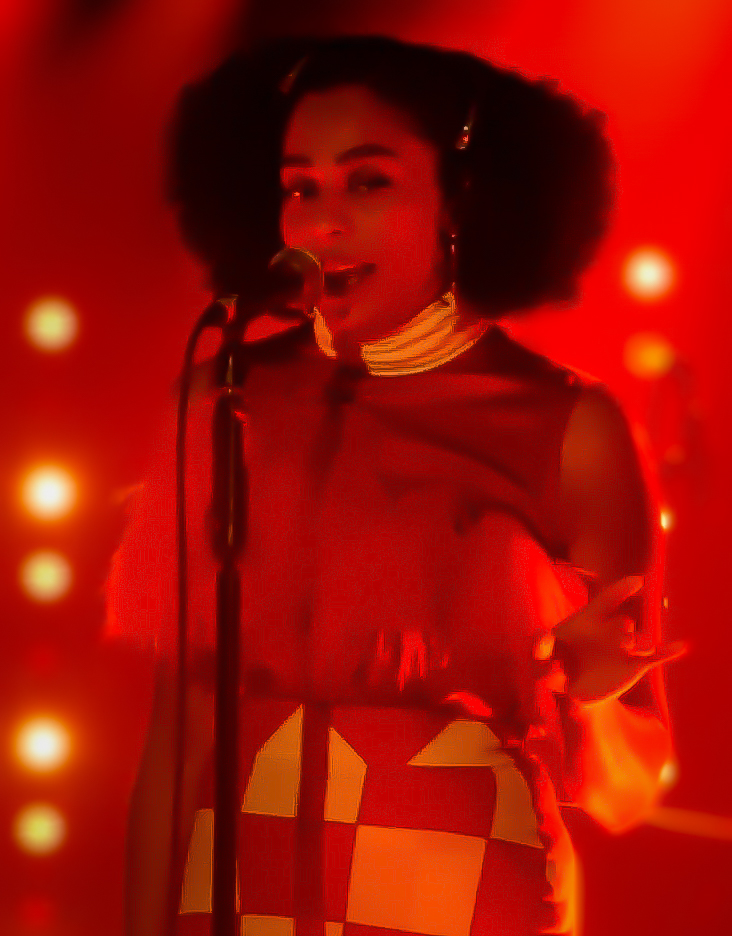
Celeste won Songwriter of the Year with Jamie Hartman.

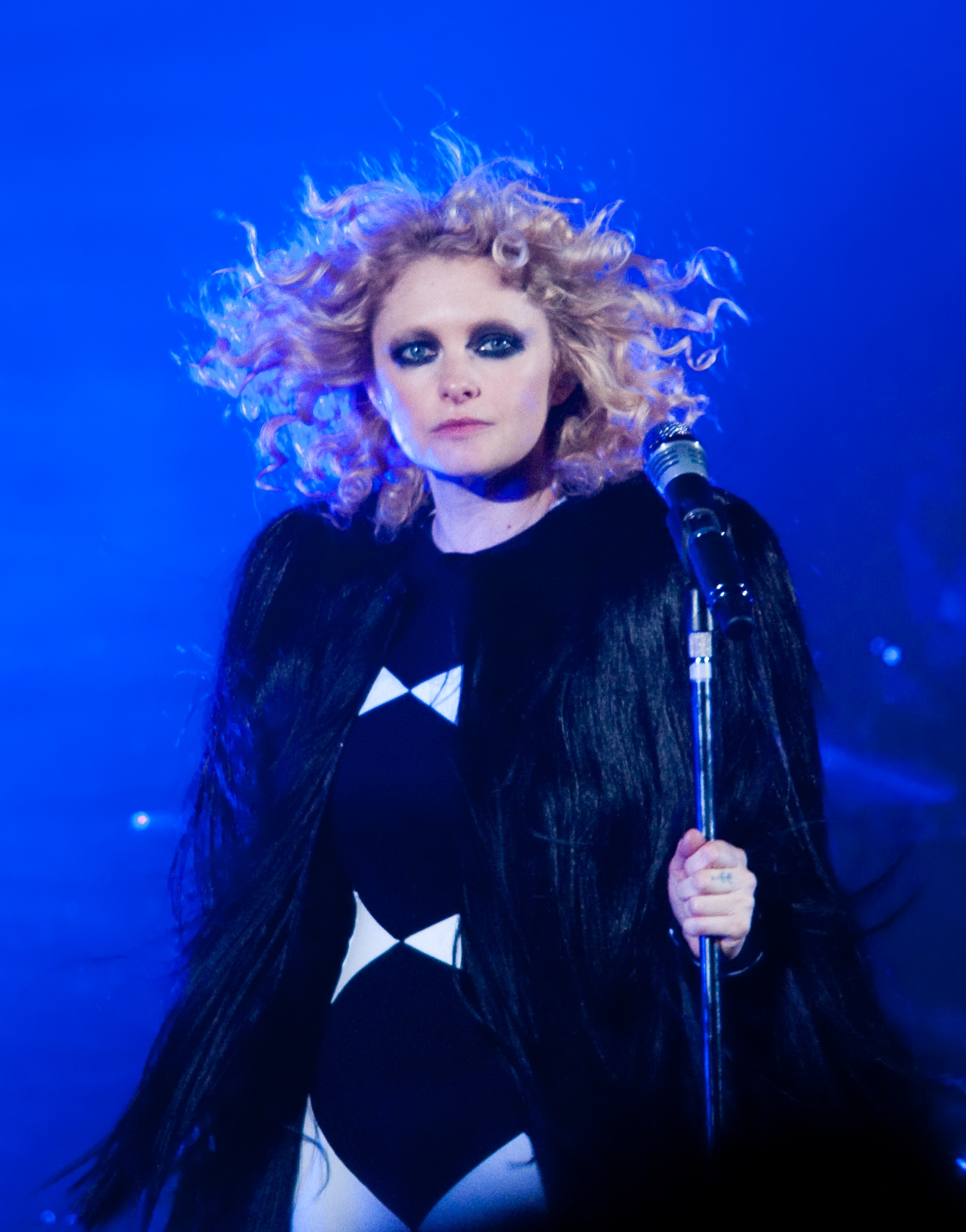
Goldfrapp won the Ivors Inspiration Award.

The winners for the 66th Ivor Novello Awards were announced on September 21, 2021.

Category	Recipient and nominees
Album Award	**Lianne La Havas – Written by Matthew Hales and Lianne La Havas; Performed by Lianne La Havas**; A Hero's Death – Written by Grian Chatten, Thomas Coll, Conor Curley, Conor Deegan and Carlos O'Connell; Performed by Fontaines D.C.; Send Them to Coventry – Written by Felix Joseph, Alastair O'Donnell and Pa Salieu; Performed by Pa Salieu; Song for Our Daughter – Written and performed by Laura Marling; What Kinda Music – Written by Yussef Dayes, Tom Misch and Rocco Palladino; Performed by Tom Misch and Yussef Dayes
Best Contemporary Song	**"Children of the Internet" – Written by Dave and Fraser T. Smith; Performed by Dave**; "Daisy" – Written by Ashnikko and Slinger; Performed by Ashnikko; "Energy" – Written by Kwes Darko, Felix Joseph, Mahalia, Alastair O'Donnell and Pa Salieu; Performed by Pa Salieu featuring Mahalia; "Give Me a Reason" – Written by Rachel Chinouriri and Tom Henry; Performed by Rachel Chinouriri; "Top Scheme" – Written and performed by For Those I Love
Best Original Film Score	**Calm with Horses – Composed by Blanck Mass**; Four Kids and It – Composed by Anne Nikitin; Saint Maud – Composed by Adam Janota Bzowski; The Trial of the Chicago 7 – Composed by Daniel Pemberton; Two by Two: Overboard! – Composed by Craig Stuart Garfinkle and Eímear Noone
Best Original Video Game Score	**Ori and the Will of the Wisps – Composed by Gareth Coker**; Ghost of Tsushima – Composed by Ilan Eshkeri and Shigeru Umebayashi; Little Orpheus – Composed by Jessica Curry and Jim Fowler
Best Song Musically and Lyrically	**"God's Own Children" – Written by Barney Lister and Obongjayar; Performed by Obongjayar**; "Black Dog" – Written by Gianluca Buccellati and Arlo Parks; Performed by Arlo Parks; "Gang" – Written and performed by Headie One and Fred again...; "Man's World" – Written and performed by Marina; "Stop This Flame" – Written by Celeste and Jamie Hartman; Performed by Celeste
Best Television Soundtrack	**Devs – Composed by Geoff Barrow, Ben Salisbury and The Insects**; A Suitable Boy – Composed by Alex Heffes and Anoushka Shankar; Dracula – Composed by David Arnold and Michael Price; Noughts + Crosses – Composed by Matthew Herbert; Us – Composed by Oli Julian
Outstanding Song Collection	**Tears for Fears (Roland Orzabal and Curt Smith)**
PRS for Music Most Performed Work	**"Adore You" – Written by Amy Allen, Tyler Johnson, Kid Harpoon and Harry Styles; Performed by Harry Styles**; "Before You Go" – Written by Tom Barnes, Lewis Capaldi, Pete Kelleher, Ben Kohn and Phil Plested; Performed by Lewis Capaldi; "Head & Heart" – Written by Jonathan Courtidis, Dan Dare and Robert Harvey; Performed by Joel Corry featuring MNEK; "Someone You Loved" – Written by Thomas Barnes, Lewis Capaldi, Peter Kelleher, Ben Kohn and Sam Roman; Performed by Lewis Capaldi; "Watermelon Sugar" – Written by Tyler Johnson, Kid Harpoon, Mitchell Rowland and Harry Styles; Performed by Harry Styles
Rising Star Award	**Willow Kayne**; Allegra; Holly Humberstone; Kamal.; Rachel Chinouriri
Songwriter of the Year	**Celeste and Jamie Hartman**; AJ Tracey; Kamille; Kid Harpoon and Harry Styles; MNEK
The Ivors Classical Music Award	**Mark-Anthony Turnage**
The Ivors Inspiration Award	**Goldfrapp (Alison Goldfrapp and Will Gregory)**
The Special International Award	**Jon Bon Jovi and Richie Sambora**
Best Large Scale Composition	**CATAMORPHOSIS** **- Composed by Anna Thorvaldsdottir**
Best Small Chamber Composition	**Sometimes Voices** **- Composed by Alex Paxton**
Best Vocal or Choral Composition	**Gyökér (Root)** **- Composed by Thomas Adès**

=== 2022 ===
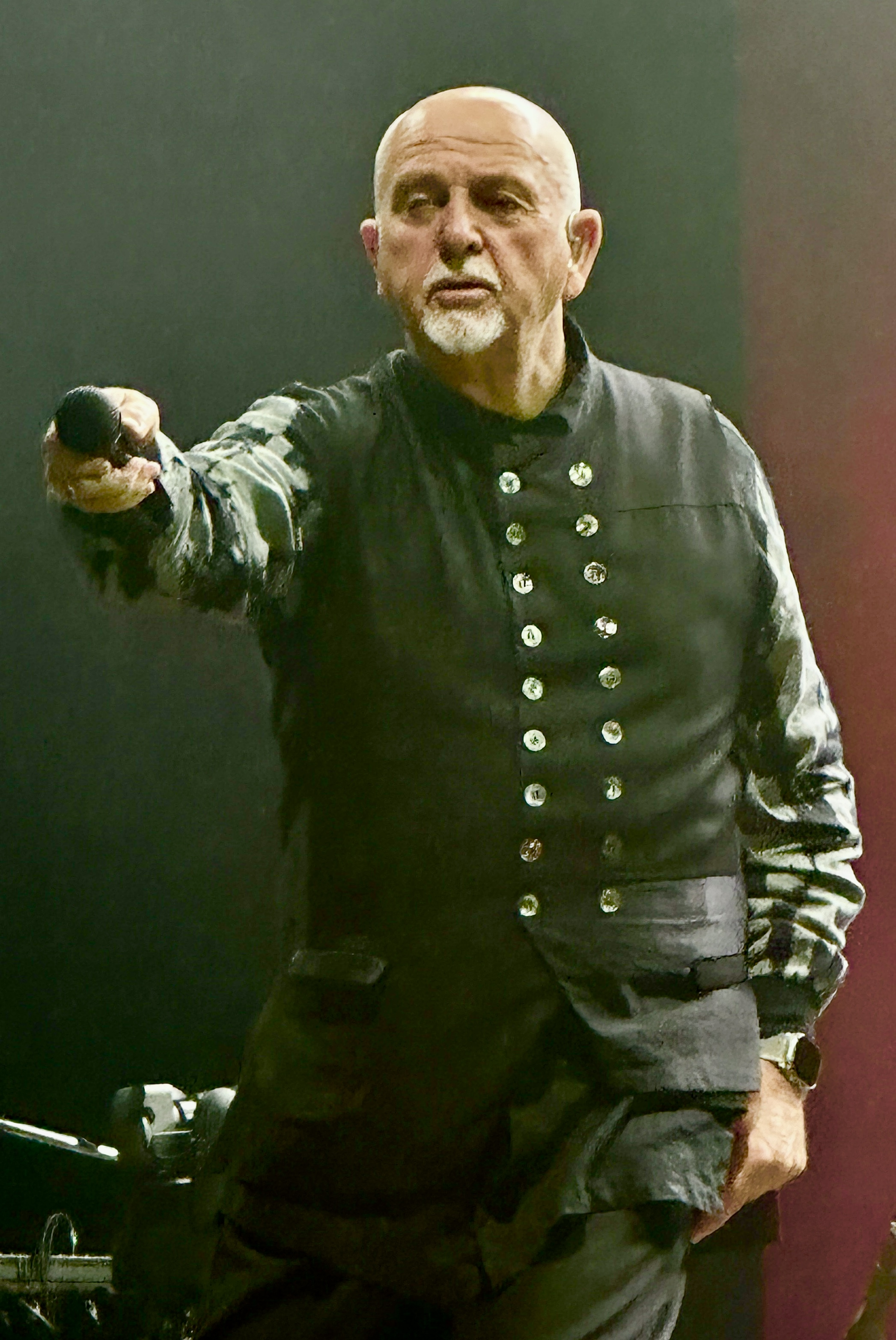
Peter Gabriel received the Academy Fellowship Award.

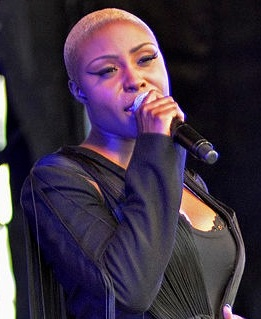
Laura Mvula won the Album Award.

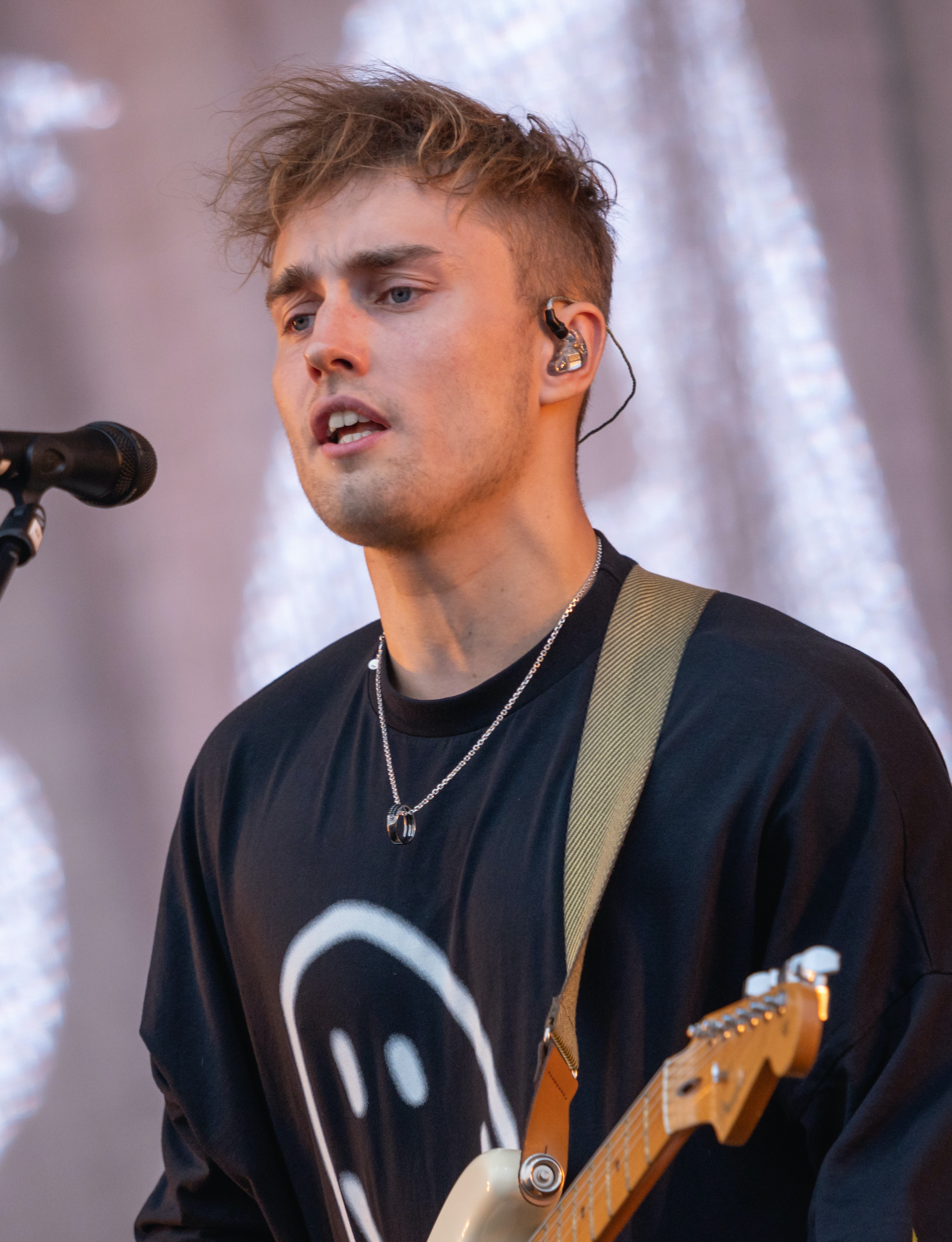
Sam Fender won Best Song, Musically and Lyrically.

The winners for the 67th Ivor Novello Awards were announced on May 19, 2022, in a ceremony at the Grosvenor House in London.

Category	Recipient and nominees
Academy Fellowship	**Peter Gabriel**
Best Album	**Pink Noise – Written by Dann Hume and Laura Mvula; Performed by Laura Mvula**; Mother – Written by Cleo Sol and Dean "Inflo" Josiah Cover; Performed by Cleo Sol; Nine – Written by Cleo Sol, Dean "Inflo" Josiah Cover and Jack Peñate; Performed by SAULT; Sometimes I Might Be Introvert – Written by Dean "Inflo" Josiah Cover and Little Simz; Performed by Little Simz; Spare Ribs – Written by Andrew Fearn and Jason Williamson; Performed by Sleaford Mods
Best Contemporary Song	**"I Love You, I Hate You" – Written by Dean "Inflo" Josiah Cover and Little Simz; Performed by Little Simz**; "Body" – Written by Gotcha, Russ Millions and Tion Wayne; Performed by Russ Millions & Tion Wayne; "Coming Back" – Written by James Blake, Dominic Maker, Starrah and SZA; Performed by James Blake featuring SZA; "Don't Judge Me" – Written and performed by FKA twigs, Fred again.. and Headie One; "Just for Me" – Written by Mura Masa, PinkPantheress, Mike Kinsella, Steve Holmes and Steve Lamos; Performed by PinkPantheress
Best Original Film Score	**The World to Come – Composed by Daniel Blumberg**; After Love – Composed by Chris Roe; Censor – Composed by Emilie Levienaise-Farrouch; Last Night in Soho – Composed by Steven Price; Spencer – Composed by Jonny Greenwood
Best Original Video Game Score	**Marvel's Guardians of the Galaxy – Composed by Richard Jacques**; OMNO – Composed by Benedict Nichols; Returnal – Composed by Bobby Krlic
Best Song, Musically and Lyrically	**"Seventeen Going Under" – Written and performed by Sam Fender**; "Easy on Me" – Written by Adele and Greg Kurstin; Performed by Adele; "All You Ever Wanted" – Written by Mike Elizondo, Natalie Hemby, Ben Jackson-Cook and Rag'n'Bone Man; Performed by Rag'n'Bone Man; "Haunted House" – Written by Sarah Aarons, Holly Humberstone and Rob Milton; Performed by Holly Humberstone; "Let's Go Home Together" – Written by James Arthur, Tom Barnes, Ella Henderson, Pete Kelleher and Ben Kohn; Performed by Ella Henderson & Tom Grennan
Best Television Soundtrack	**Landscapers – Composed by Arthur Sharpe**; Blitz Spirit with Lucy Worsley – Composed by Jessica Dannheisser; Robin Robin – Composed by Ben Please and Beth Porter; The Outlaws – Composed by Stew Jackson and Dan Jones; The Serpent – Composed by Dominik Scherrer
PRS for Music Most Performed Work	**"Bad Habits" – Written by Fred again.., Johnny McDaid and Ed Sheeran; Performed by Ed Sheeran**; "Bed" – Written by David Guetta, Jin Jin, Raye and Giorgio Tuinfort; Performed by Joel Corry, Raye and David Guetta; "Cold Heart (Pnau remix)" – Written by Elton John, Bernie Taupin, Andrew Meecham and Dean Meredith; Performed by Elton John & Dua Lipa; "Little Bit of Love" – Written by Daniel Bryer, Tom Grennan and Mike Needle; Performed by Tom Grennan; "Shivers" – Written by Kal Lavelle, Steve Mac, Johnny McDaid and Ed Sheeran; Performed by Ed Sheeran
Rising Star Award with Apple Music	**Naomi Kimpenu**; Ashaine White; Luz; Matilda Mann; PinkPantheress
Songwriter of the Year	**Dave**; Adele; Ed Sheeran; Coldplay; Raye
PRS for Music Special International Award	**Shakira**
The Ivors Visionary Award	**Cocteau Twins (Elizabeth Fraser, Robin Guthrie, and Simon Raymonde)**
Best Chamber Ensemble Composition	**Madame ma bonne sœur** **- Composed by Brett Dean**
Best Choral Composition	**All Shall Be Well** **- Composed by Joanna Marsh**
Best Large Ensemble Composition	**Scenes From The Wild** **- Composed by Cheryl Frances-Hoad**
Best Orchestral Composition	**to an utterance** **- Composed by Rebecca Saunders**
Best Small Chamber Composition	**Natural World** **- Composed by Laurence Crane**

=== 2023 ===
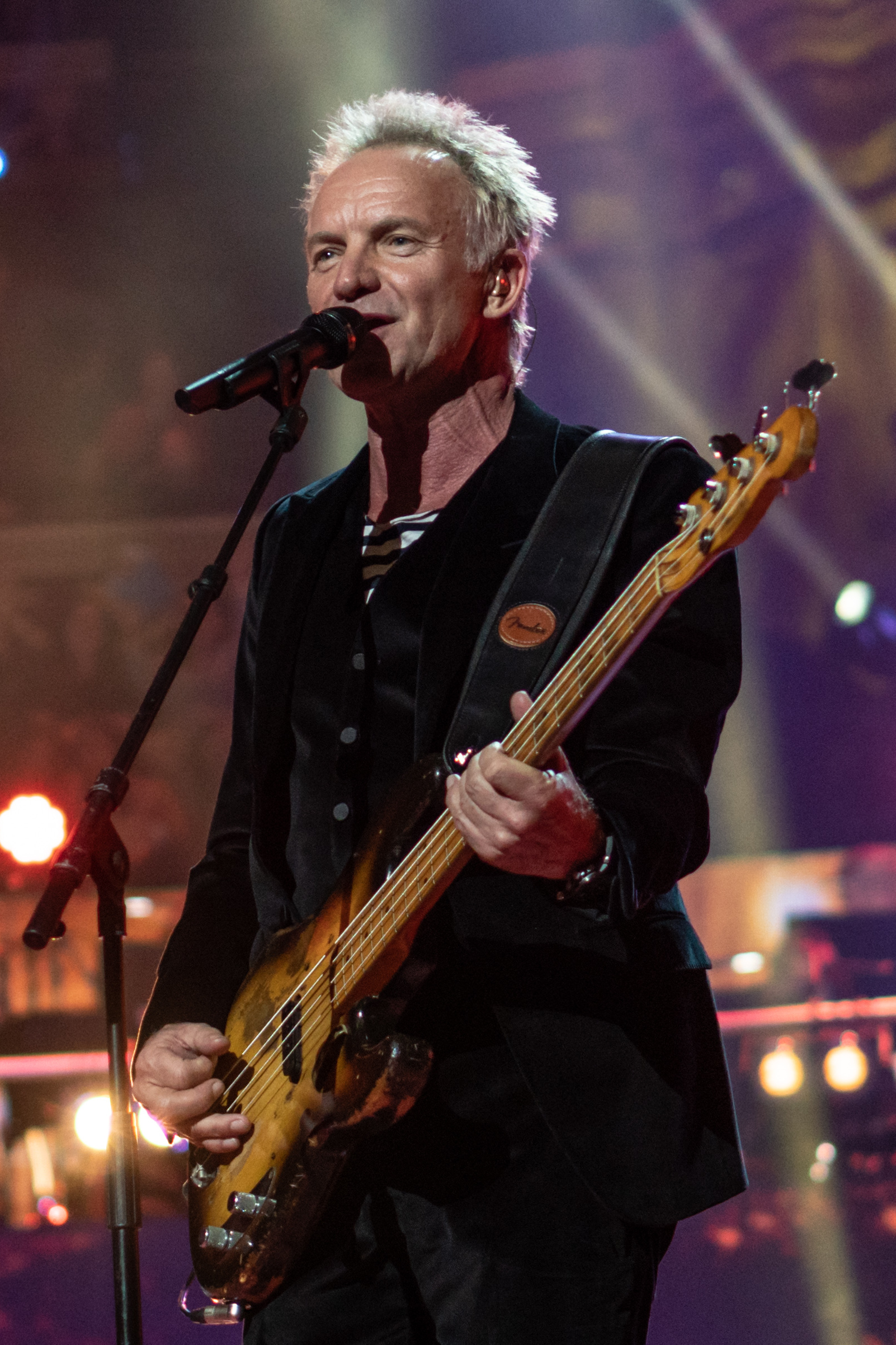
Sting received the Academy Fellowship.

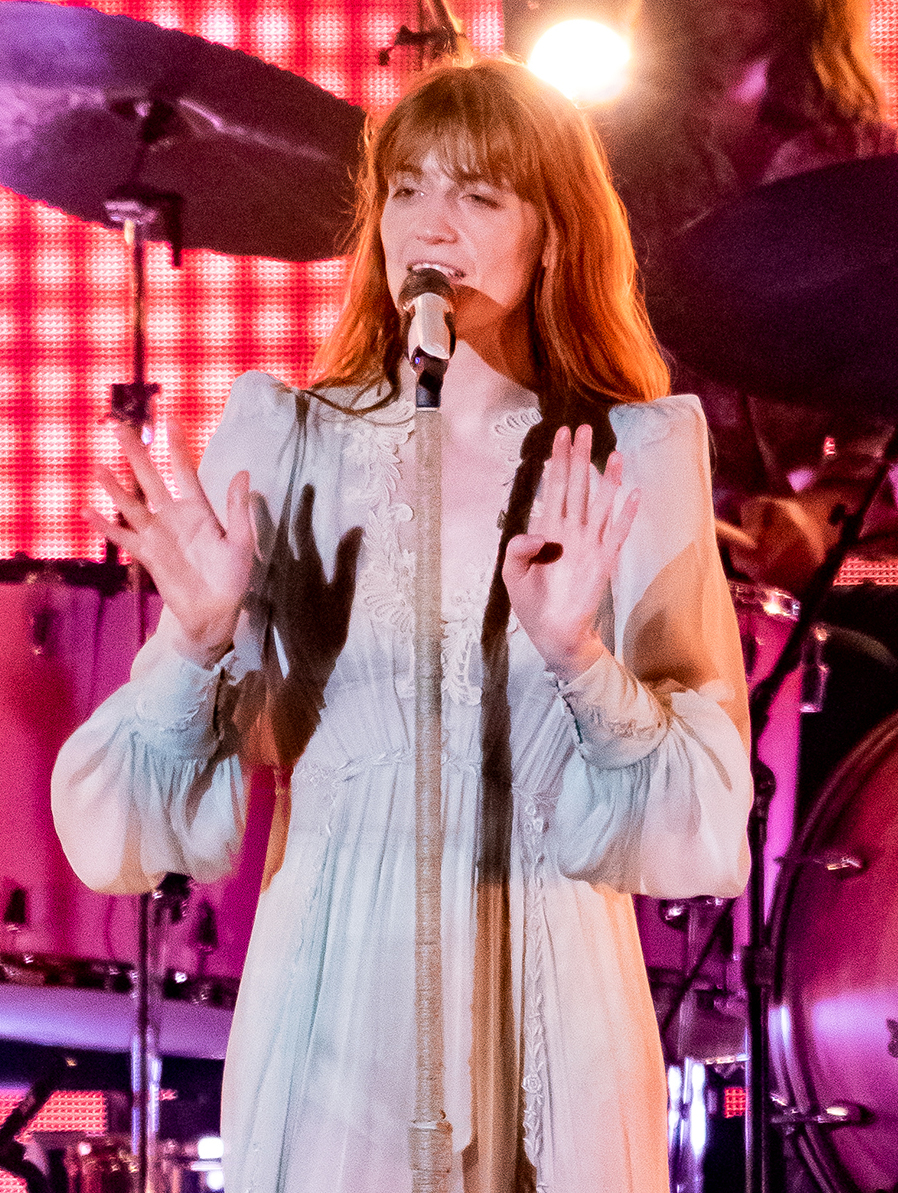
Florence Welch won Best Song, Musically and Lyrically alongside Jack Antonoff.

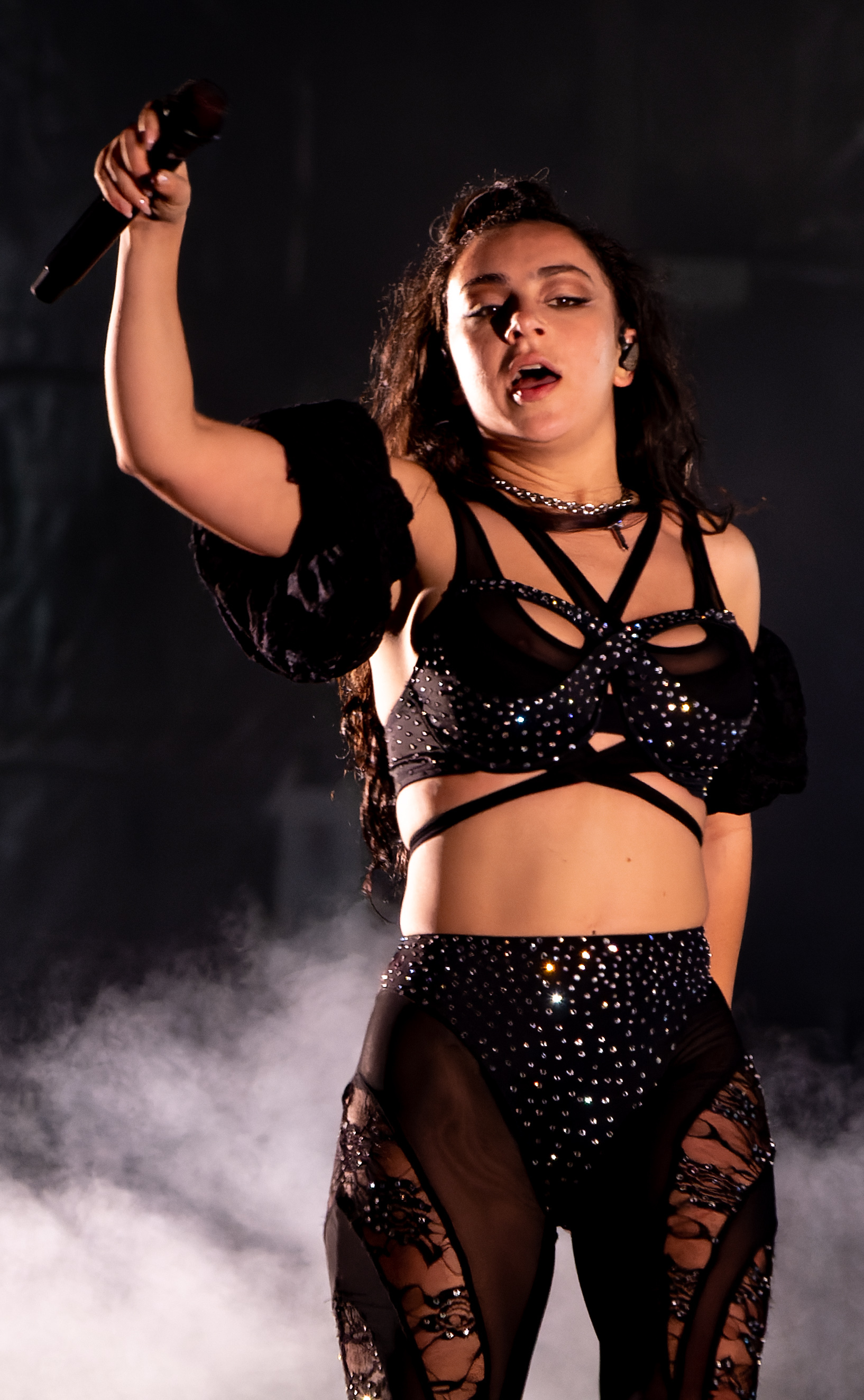
Charli XCX received the Ivors Visionary Award.

The winners for the 68th Ivor Novello Awards were announced on May 18, 2023, in a ceremony at the Grosvenor House in London. The nominees were announced on April 18, 2023.

Category	Recipient and nominees
Academy Fellowship	**Sting**
Best Album	**11 – Written by Dean "Inflo" Josiah Cover, Jamar McNaughton, Cleopatra Nikolic and Jack Peñate; Performed by SAULT**; No Thank You – Written by Dean "Inflo" Josiah Cover, Little Simz and Cleopatra Nikolic; Performed by Little Simz; Skinty Fia – Written by Grian Chatten, Thomas Coll, Conor Curley, Conor Deegan and Carlos O'Connell; Performed by Fontaines D.C.; Some Nights I Dream of Doors – Written by Barney Lister and Obongjayar; Performed by Obongjayar; The Car – Written by Alex Turner; Performed by Arctic Monkeys
Best Contemporary Song	"**Escapism" – Written by 070 Shake, Raye and Mike Sabath; Performed by Raye and 070 Shake**; "Cold Summer" – Written by Wesley Joseph and Leon Vynehall; Performed by Wesley Joseph; "Hide & Seek" – Written by Owen Cutts, P2J, PRGRSHN and Stormzy; Performed by Stormzy; "Leon the Professional" – Written by Knucks, Venna and Toshifumi Hinata; Performed by Knucks; "Payback" – Written by Knucks, Kojey Radical and Swindle; Performed by Kojey Radical featuring Knucks
Best Original Film Score	**Don't Worry Darling – Composed by John Powell**; Avatar: The Way of Water – Composed by Simon Franglen; Death on the Nile – Composed by Patrick Doyle; Mrs. Harris Goes to Paris – Composed by Rael Jones; The Electrical Life of Louis Wain – Composed by Arthur Sharpe
Best Original Video Game Score	**Mario + Rabbids Sparks of Hope – Composed by Yoko Shimomura, Grant Kirkhope and Gareth Coker**; Gotham Knights – Composed by The Flight; Horizon Forbidden West – Composed by Joris de Man, Oleksa Lozowchuk and The Flight
Best Song, Musically and Lyrically	"**King" – Written by Jack Antonoff and Florence Welch; Performed by Florence + The Machine**; "As It Was" – Written by Kid Harpoon, Tyler Johnson and Harry Styles; Performed by Harry Styles; "Best Day of My Life" – Written by Laurie Blundell and Tom Odell; Performed by Tom Odell; "Complex" – Written and performed by Katie Gregson-MacLeod; "Stronger" – Written by Dean "Inflo" Josiah Cover and Cleopatra Nikolic; Performed by Sault
Best Television Soundtrack	**The Midwich Cuckoos – Composed by Hannah Peel**; Bad Sisters – Composed by PJ Harvey and Tim Phillips; Elizabeth: The Unseen Queen – Composed by David Schweitzer; The Responder – Composed by Matthew Herbert; The Thief, His Wife and the Canoe – Composed by Harry Escott and Ben Pearson
PRS for Music Most Performed Work	**"As It Was" – Written by Kid Harpoon, Tyler Johnson and Harry Styles; Performed by Harry Styles**; "Bad Habits" – Written by FRED, Johnny McDaid and Ed Sheeran; Performed by Ed Sheeran; "Heat Waves" – Written by Dave Bayley; Performed by Glass Animals; "Running Up That Hill" – Written and performed by Kate Bush; "Shivers" – Written by Johnny McDaid, Kal Lavelle, Steve Mac and Ed Sheeran; Performed by Ed Sheeran
Rising Star Award with Apple Music	**Victoria Canal**; Cat Burns; Ines Dunn; Tendai; Venbee
Songwriter of the Year	**Rhian Teasdale and Hester Chambers (Wet Leg)**; Central Cee and Young Chencs; Florence Welch; George Daniel and Matty Healy (The 1975); Harry Styles and Kid Harpoon
PRS for Music Special International Award	**James (Tim Booth, Saul Davies, Jim Glennie, Larry Gott and Mark Hunter)**
The Ivors Visionary Award	**Charli XCX**
Outstanding Song Collection	**Kamille**
Best Chamber Ensemble Composition	**Növények** **- Composed by Thomas Adès**
Best Choral Composition	**Sol - Composed by Ben Nobuto**
Best Large Ensemble Composition	**shouting forever into the receiver** **- Composed by Hannah Kendall**
Best Orchestral Composition	**Cello Concerto** **- Composed by Brett Dean**
Best Small Chamber Composition	**Comme l’espoir/you might all disappear** **- Composed by Josephine Stephenson**

=== 2024 ===
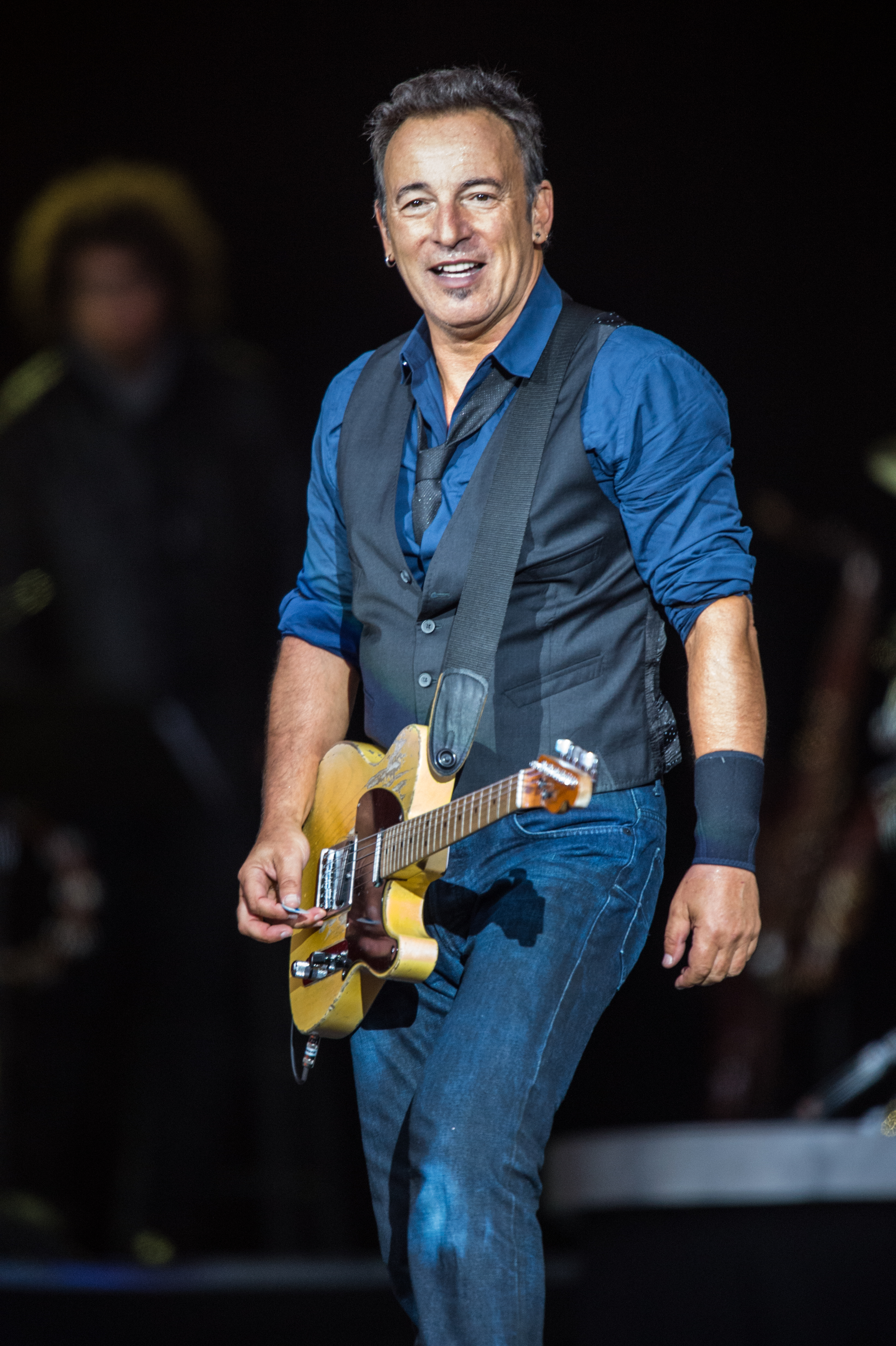
Bruce Springsteen received the Academy Fellowship.

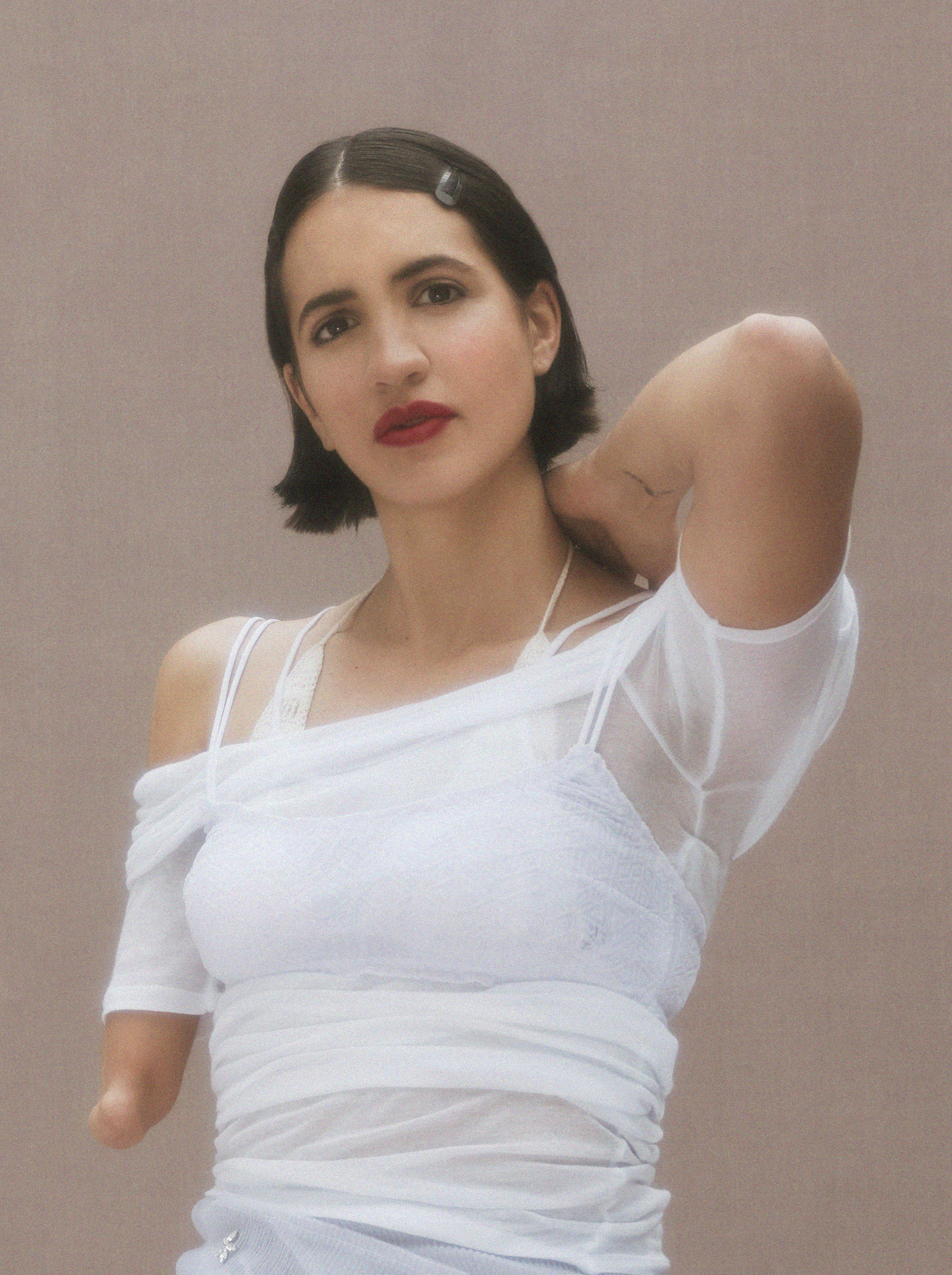
Victoria Canal won Best Song, Musically and Lyrically.

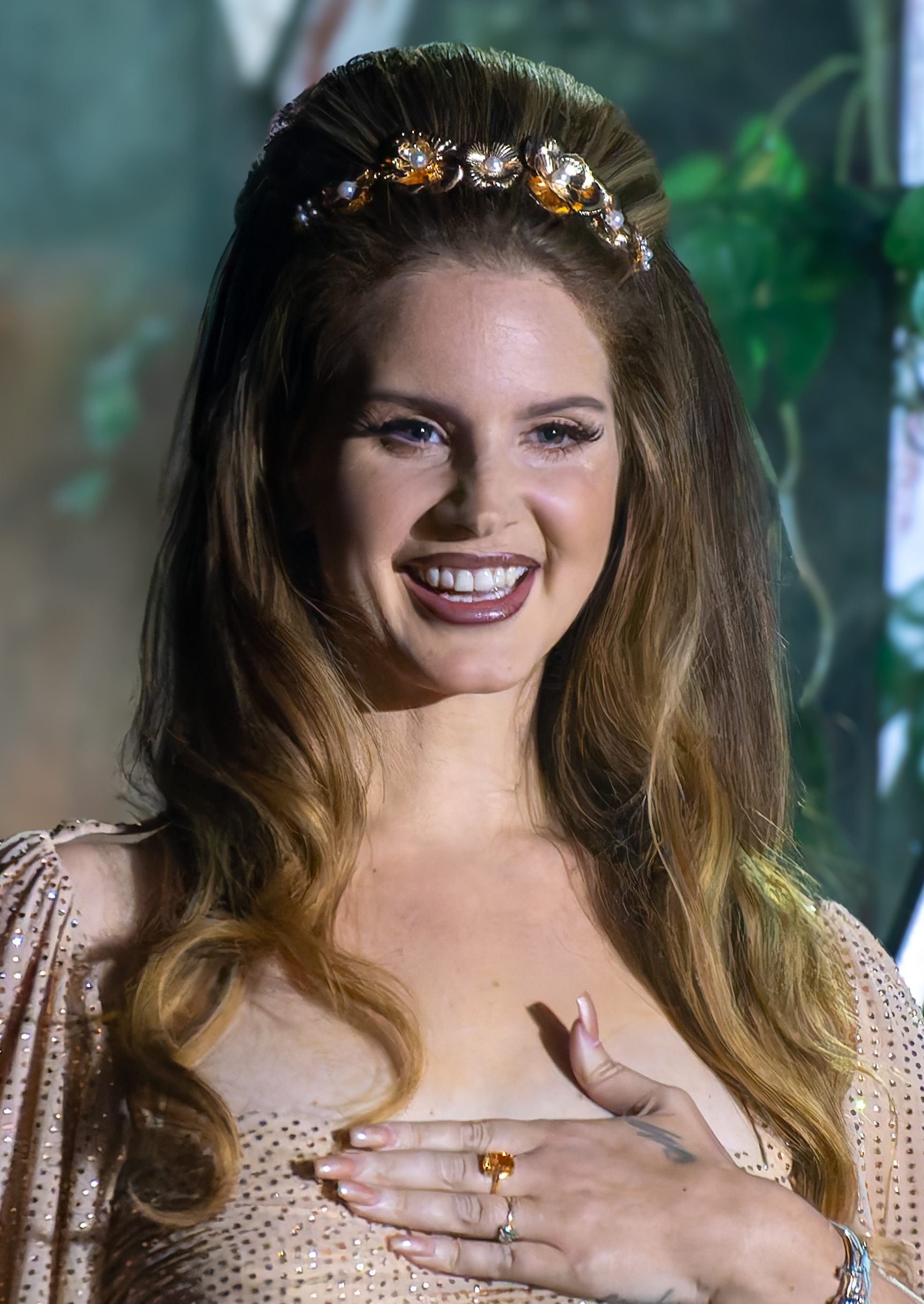
Lana Del Rey won the PRS for Music Special International Award.

The nominees for the 69th Ivor Novello Awards were announced on April 23, 2024. The ceremony took place at Grosvenor House, London, on May 23, 2024.

Category	Recipient and nominees
Academy Fellowship	**Bruce Springsteen**
Best Album	**Black Classical Music – Written by Yussef Dayes, Rocco Palladino and Charlie Stacey; Performed by Yussef Dayes**; Crazymad, for Me – Written by CMAT; Performed by CMAT; False Lankum – Written by Daragh Lynch, Ian Lynch, Cormac MacDiarmada and Radie Peat; Performed by Lankum; Lahai – Written by Sampha; Performed by Sampha; My 21st Century Blues – Written by Raye and Mike Sabath; Performed by Raye
Best Contemporary Song	**"Geronimo Blues" – Written by Giles Kwakeulati "Kwake Bass" King-Ashong, Peter Bennie, Alan Ross "Biscuit" Harris, Raven Bush and Kae Tempest; Performed by Speakers Corner Quartet featuring Kae Tempest**; "Back on 74" – Written by Lydia Kitto, Josh Lloyd and Tom McFarland; Performed by Jungle; "Enough" – Written by Brian Eno, Fred Gibson, Buddy Ross and Winnie Raeder; Performed by Fred Again and Brian Eno; "Mama's Eyes" – Written by Todd Dulaney, Ines Dunn, Barney Lister and Mette; Performed by Mette; "Water" – Written by Imani "Mocha" Lewis, Corey Lindsay-Keay, Jackson Lomastro, Ari PenSmith, Rayo, Sammy Soso and Olmo Zucca; Performed by Tyla
Best Original Film Score	**Poor Things – Composed by Jerskin Fendrix**; Spider-Man: Across the Spider-Verse – Composed by Daniel Pemberton; Typist Artist Pirate King – Composed by Carly Paradis
Best Original Video Game Score	**Star Wars Jedi: Survivor – Composed by Stephen Barton and Gordy Haab**; Call of Duty: Modern Warfare III – Composed by Walter Mair; Tin Hearts – Composed by Matthew Chastney
Best Song, Musically and Lyrically	**"Black Swan" – Written by Victoria Canal, Jonny Lattimer and Eg White; Performed by Victoria Canal**; "Black Friday" – Written by Laurie Blundell, Max Clilverd and Tom Odell; Performed by Tom Odell; "Spirit 2.0" – Written by Yussef Dayes and Sampha; Performed by Sampha; "Sunshine Baby" – Written by Amber Bain; Performed by The Japanese House; "The Narcissist" – Written by Damon Albarn, Graham Coxon, Alex James and Dave Rowntree; Performed by Blur
Best Television Soundtrack	**The Following Events Are Based on a Pack of Lies – Composed by Arthur Sharpe**; Boat Story – Composed by Dominik Scherrer; Slow Horses (season three) – Composed by Daniel Pemberton and Toydrum; The Crown (The Final Season) – Composed by Martin Phipps; Three Little Birds – Composed by Benjamin Kwasi Burrell
PRS for Music Most Performed Work	**"Sprinter" – Written by Central Cee, Dave, Jo Caleb and Jonny Leslie; Performed by Central Cee and Dave**; "As It Was" – Written by Kid Harpoon, Tyler Johnson and Harry Styles; Performed by Harry Styles; "Boy's a Liar, Pt. 2" – Written by Ice Spice, Mura Masa and PinkPantheress; Performed by PinkPantheress and Ice Spice; "Giving Me" – Written by Conor Bissett, Robert Griffiths and Jazzy; Performed by Jazzy; "Strangers" – Written by Kenya Grace; Performed by Kenya Grace
Rising Star Award with Apple Music	**Master Peace**; Blair Davie; Chrissi; Elmiene; Nino SLG
Songwriter of the Year	**Raye**
PRS for Music Special International Award	**Lana Del Rey**
The Ivors Visionary Award	**Skepta**
Outstanding Song Collection	**KT Tunstall**
Outstanding Contribution to British Music	**Bernie Taupin**
Best Chamber Ensemble Composition	**TOMB!** **- Composed by Laurence Osborn**
Best Choral Composition	**The City, Full Of People - Composed by Cassandra Miller**
Best Large Ensemble Composition	**The Horse - Composed by Matthew Herbert**
Best Orchestral Composition	**Horn Concerto - Composed by Gavin Higgins**
Best Small Chamber Composition	**The Mouth - Composed by Rebecca Saunders**

=== 2025 ===
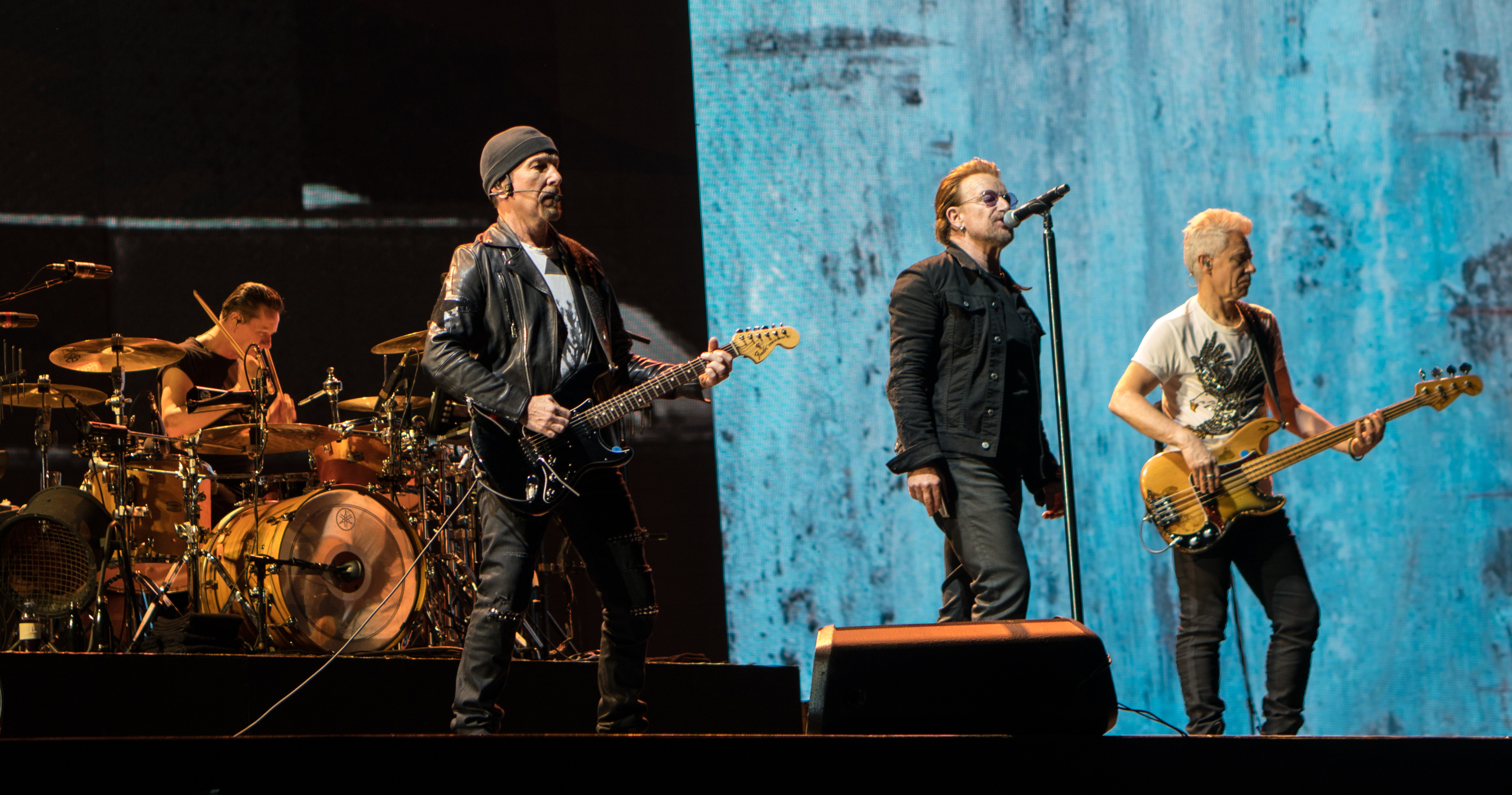
U2 received the Academy Fellowship.

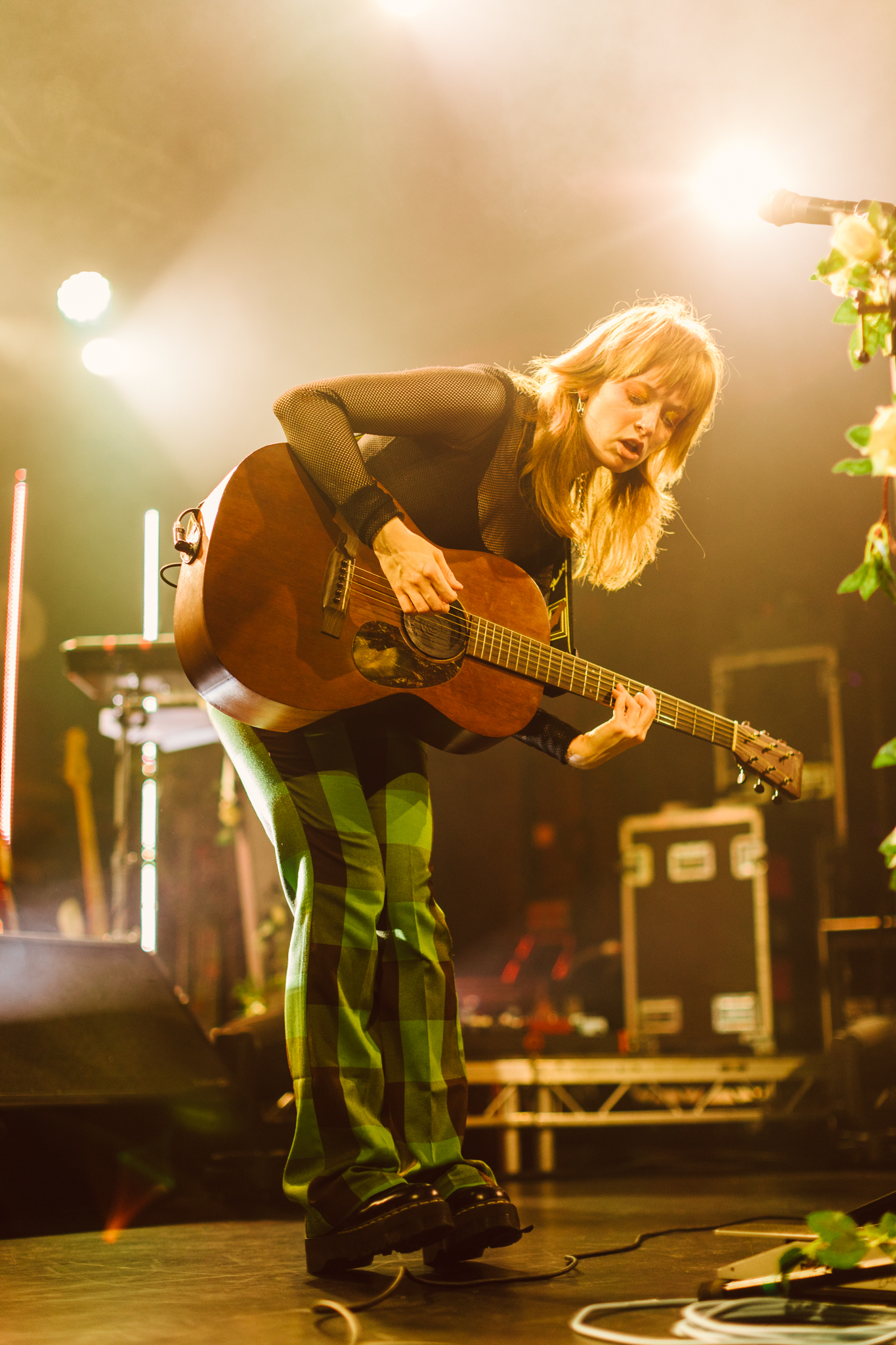
Orla Gartland won Best Song, Musically and Lyrically.

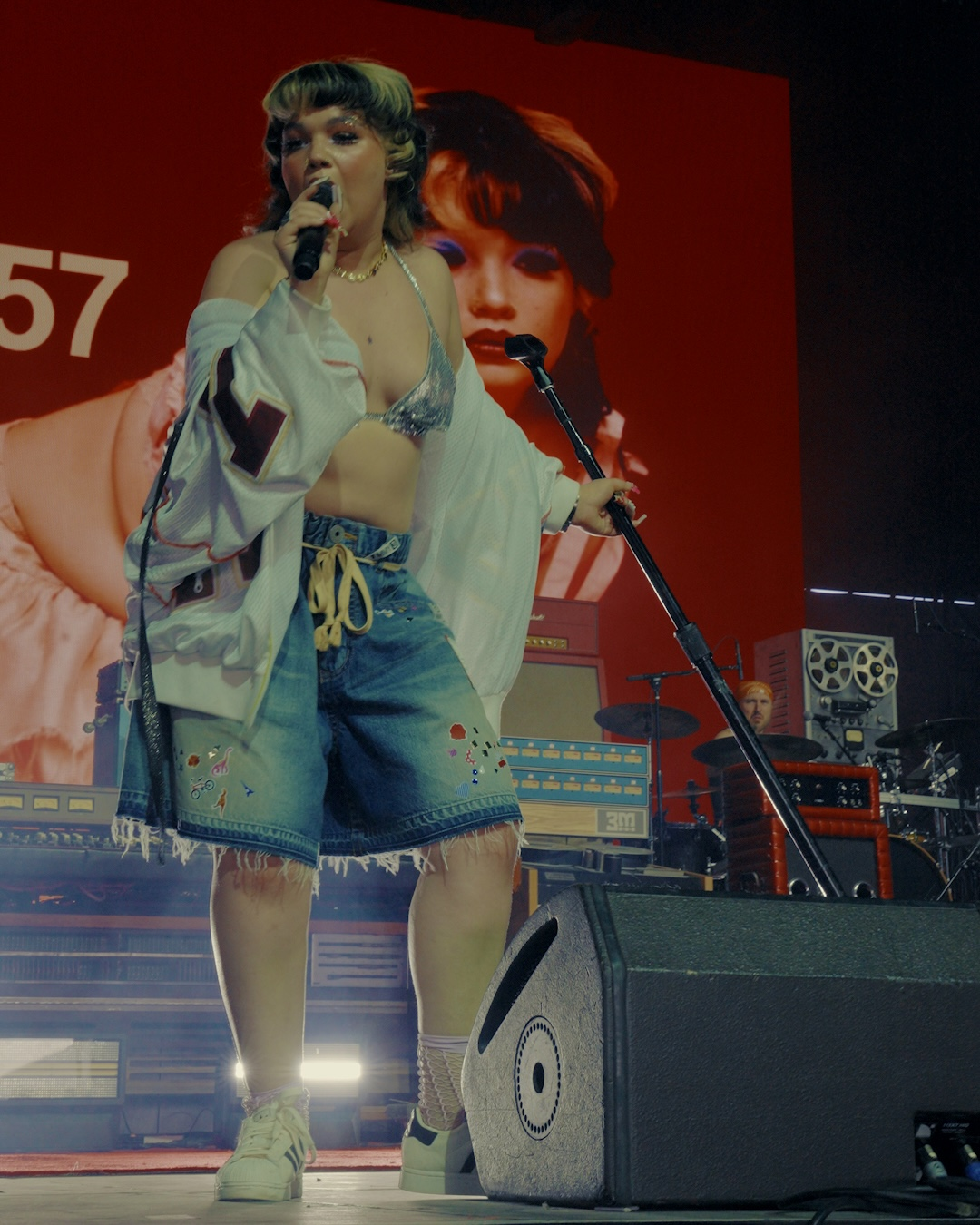
Lola Young received the Rising Star Award.

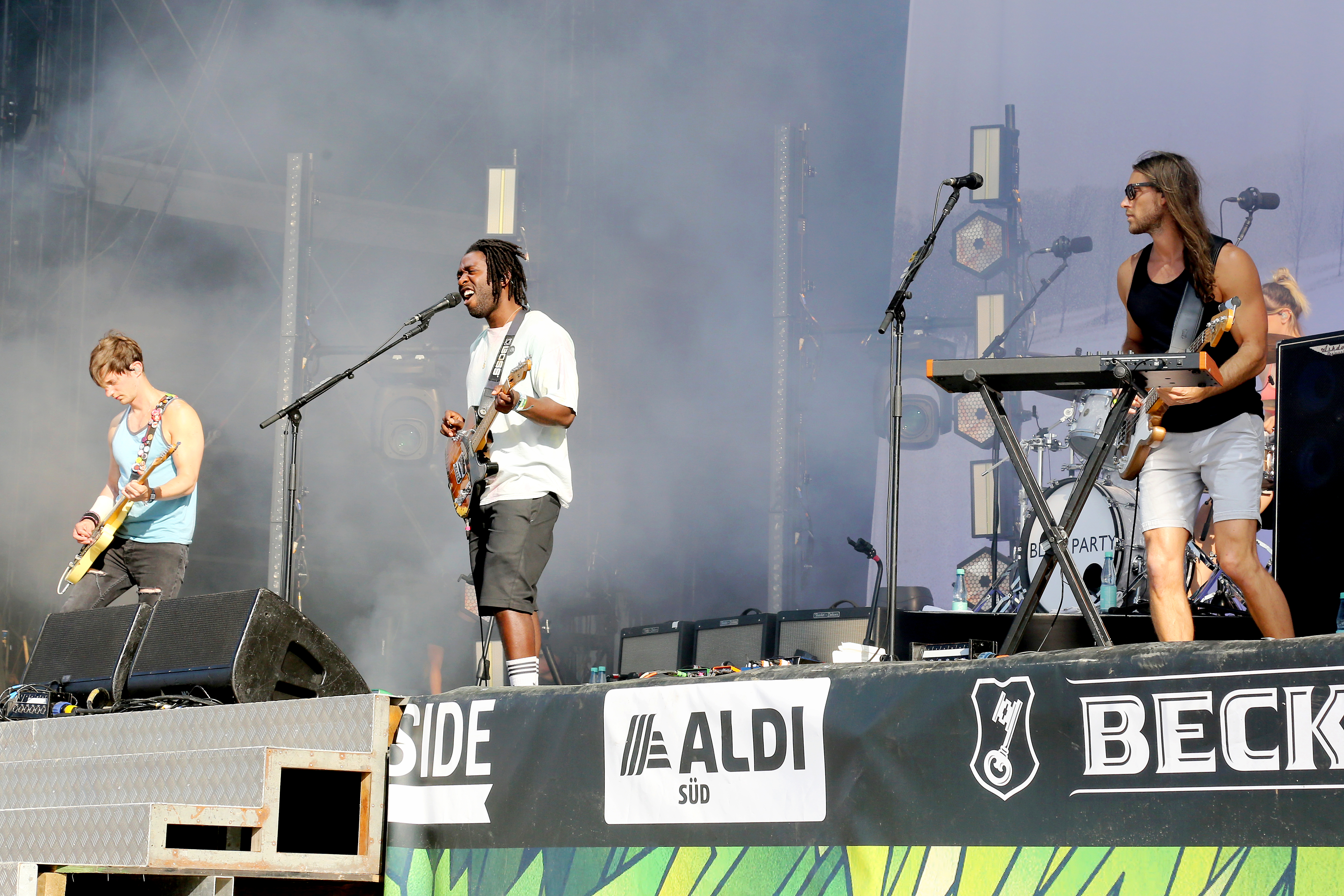
Bloc Party won Outstanding Song Collection.

The nominees for the 70th Ivor Novello Awards were announced on April 23, 2025. The ceremony will take place at Grosvenor House, London, on May 22, 2025. The ceremony took place at Grosvenor House, London, on May 22, 2025.

Category	Recipient and nominees
Academy Fellowship	**Bono, The Edge, Adam Clayton, and Larry Mullen Jr. (U2)**
Best Album	**Who Am I – Written and performed by Berwyn**; Brat – Written by Charli XCX, A. G. Cook, and Finn Keane; Performed by Charli XCX; On Purpose, with Purpose – Written by Ghetts and TenBillion Dreams; Performed by Ghetts; The Loop – Written and performed by Jordan Rakei; This Wasn't Meant for You Anyway – Written by William Brown, Conor Dickinson, Jared Solomon, and Lola Young; Performed by Lola Young
Best Contemporary Song	**"Circumvagating Georgia" – Written and performed by Sans Soucis**; "Allergy" – Written by Felix Joseph, Alastair O'Donnell, and Pa Salieu; Performed by Pa Salieu; "Angel of My Dreams" – Written by Pablo Bowman, JADE, Steph Jones, and Mike Sabath; Performed by JADE; "Double Standards" – Written by Ghetts, EMIL, Sampha Sisay, and R-Kay; Performed by Ghetts featuring Sampha; "How Black Men Lose Their Smile" – Written by Bashy, Toddla T, and Linton Kwesi Johnson; Performed by Bashy
Best Original Film Score	**The Substance – Composed by Raffertie**; Fly Me to the Moon – Composed by Daniel Pemberton; Hard Truths – Composed by Gary Yershon; Kneecap – Composed by Michael "Mickey J" Asante; The Zone of Interest – Composed by Mica Levi
Best Original Video Game Score	**Farewell North – Composed by John Konsolakis**; Empire of the Ants – Composed by Mathieu Alvado and Mark Choi; Flock – Composed by Eli Rainsberry; Senua's Saga: Hellblade II – Composed by David García Diaz; The Casting of Frank Stone – Composed by Boxed Ape
Best Song, Musically and Lyrically	**"Mine" – Written and performed by Orla Gartland**; "Child of Mine" – Written and performed by Laura Marling; "Genesis" – Written by Rodney Jerkins, RAYE, and Toneworld; Performed by RAYE; "In the Modern World" – Written by Grian Chatten, Conor Curley, Conor Deegan, Thomas Coll, and Carlos O'Connell; Performed by Fontaines D.C.; "Messy" – Written by Conor Dickinson and Lola Young; Performed by Lola Young
Best Television Soundtrack	**True Detective: Night Country – Composed by Vince Pope**; Black Doves – Composed by Martin Phipps; Mary & George – Composed by Oliver Coates; Rivals – Composed by Jack Halama and Natalie Holt; Until I Kill You – Composed by Carly Paradis
PRS for Music Most Performed Work	**"Stargazing" – Written by Peter Fenn, Jesse Fink, and Myles Smith; Performed by Myles Smith**; "As It Was" – Written by Harry Styles, Kid Harpoon, and Tyler Johnson; Performed by Harry Styles; "Houdini" – Written by Caroline Ailin, Danny L Harle, Tobias Jesso Jr., Dua Lipa, and Kevin Parker; Performed by Dua Lipa; "Last Christmas" – Written by George Michael; Performed by Wham!; "Prada" – Written by D-Block Europe, Obi Ebele, Uche Ebele, Jahmori "Jaymo" Simmons, and RAYE; Performed by Cassö, RAYE and D-Block Europe
Rising Star Award with Apple Music	**Lola Young**; Bea and Her Business; Liang Lawrence; LULU.; Nia Smith
Songwriter of the Year	**Charli XCX**
Special International Award	**Brandon Flowers**
The Ivors Visionary Award	**Self Esteem**
Outstanding Song Collection	**Kele Okereke, Russell Lissack, Gordon Moakes, and Matt Tong (Bloc Party)**
PRS for Music Icon Award	**Robbie Williams**
Best Chamber Ensemble Composition	**Invocación n.2: A Kintsugi Resurrection** **- Composed by Anibal Vidal**
Best Choral Composition	**Orbits - Composed by Anna Clyne**
Best Large Ensemble Composition	**finding gills [when they try to drown you]** **- Composed by Nneka Cummins**
Best Orchestral Composition	**Folk - Composed by Helen Grime**
Best Small Chamber Composition	**Black Gold - Composed by Luke Mombrea**

=== 2026 ===
The 71st Ivor Novello Awards took place on May 21, 2026, at Grosvenor House, London. The nominations were announced on March 25, 2026, by The Ivors Academy, with the winners presented at the ceremony on May 21.

Category	Recipient and nominees
Academy Fellowship	**George Michael** **Thom Yorke**
Best Album	**Euro-Country – Written and performed by CMAT**: Black British Music (2025) – Written by Jim Legxacy and Joe Stanley; Performed by Jim Legxacy; The Art of Loving – Written by Olivia Dean, Bastian Langebaek and Max Wolfgang; Performed by Olivia Dean; The Clearing – Written by Joff Oddie and Ellie Rowsell; Performed by Wolf Alice; West End Girl – Written by Lily Allen, Chloe Angelides, Kito and Blue May; Performed by Lily Allen
Best Contemporary Song	**"I Stand on the Line" – Written by Fraser T. Smith and Kae Tempest; Performed by Kae Tempest**: "Damascus" – Written by Damon Albarn, Yasiin Bey and Omar Souleyman; Performed by Gorillaz featuring Omar Souleyman and Yasiin Bey; "Free" – Written by Alex Bonfanti, Miles Clinton James and Little Simz; Performed by Little Simz; "I Do and I Don't Care" – Written by Johan Hugo and Self Esteem; Performed by Self Esteem; "Know Yourself" – Written by Tom Rowlands, Fraser T. Smith and Kae Tempest; Performed by Kae Tempest
Best Song Musically and Lyrically	**"Don't Fall Asleep" – Written and performed by Jacob Alon**: "Everybody Scream" – Written by Mark Bowen, Mitski and Florence Welch; Performed by Florence + the Machine; "Focus Is Power" – Written by Johan Hugo, Self Esteem and Pale Jay; Performed by Self Esteem; "The Sofa" – Written by Ellie Rowsell; Performed by Wolf Alice; "Weeds" – Written by Tove Burman, Anya Jones and Jon Shave; Performed by Sugababes
PRS for Music Most Performed Work	**"Messy" – Written and performed by Lola Young**: "Man I Need" – Written by Olivia Dean, Tobias Jesso Jr. and Zach Nahome; Performed by Olivia Dean; "Stargazing" – Written by Peter Fenn, Jesse Fink and Myles Smith; Performed by Myles Smith; "The Days" – Written and performed by Chrystal; "Viva la Vida" – Written by Guy Berryman, Jonny Buckland, Will Champion and Chris Martin; Performed by Coldplay
Rising Star Award	**Jacob Alon** Chloe Qisha Divorce kwn Skye Newman
Best Original Film Score	**Testimony – Composed by Tom Hodge**: Bugonia – Composed by Jerskin Fendrix; Dragonfly – Composed by Raffertie; Nosferatu – Composed by Robin Carolan; The Brutalist – Composed by Daniel Blumberg
Best Television Soundtrack	**Trespasses – Composed by David Holmes and Brian Irvine**: Adolescence – Composed by Aaron May and David Ridley; Lazarus – Composed by Sarah Warne; Summerwater – Composed by Gazelle Twin; This City Is Ours – Composed by Rael Jones
Outstanding Song Collection	**Lily Allen**
PRS for Music Icon Award	**Calvin Harris**
International Songwriter of the Year	**Rosalía**
Songwriter of the Year with Amazon Music	**Sam Fender**
Special International Award with Amazon Music	**Linda Perry**
Visionary Award with Amazon Music	**Kano**
