= Jack Peñate =

English musician (born 1984)

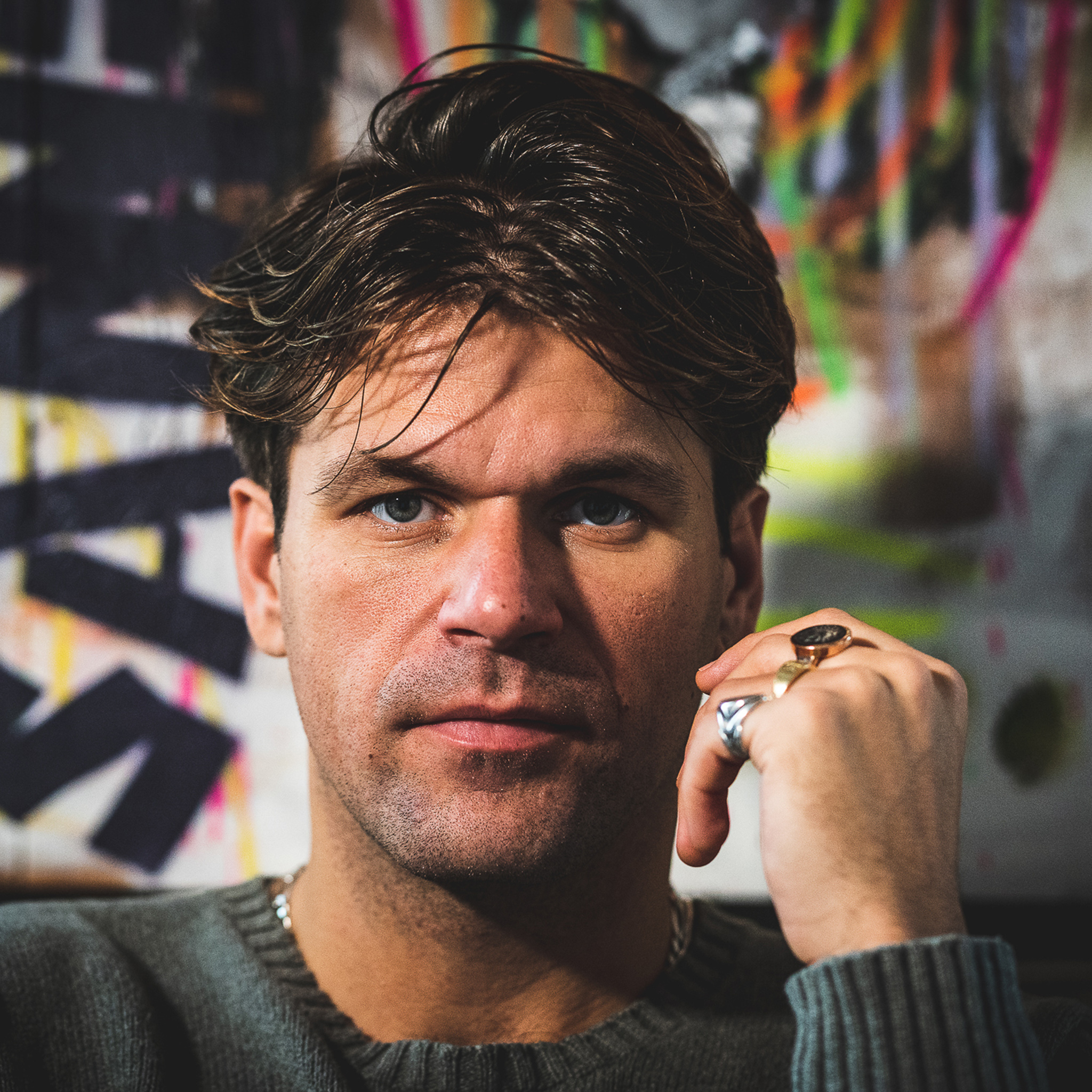

Background information
- Born: 2 September 1984 (age 42); London, England
- Genres: Indie rock; soul; rockabilly
- Occupations: Singer; songwriter; musician
- Instruments: Vocals; guitar; keyboards
- Years active: 2005–present
- Label: XL

Jack Peñate (born 2 September 1984) is an English singer, songwriter, producer, and musician.

== Early life ==
Peñate was born in London on 2 September 1984, the son of an English mother and a Spanish father. His maternal grandfather was author Mervyn Peake. He attended Alleyn's School in Dulwich alongside Jessie Ware, The Maccabees, and Florence Welch.

== Career ==
Peñate released his debut album Matinée in 2007 under XL Recordings. A young and then-unknown Adele provided the backing vocals for the song, "My Yvonne". Peñate's second album Everything Is New was released in 2009. In June 2015, Peñate stated he was working on new material, releasing his first new music in five years in 2018. After a decade without an album, he released his third album After You in 2019.

Since 2021, Peñate has collaborated with Inflo and the musical collective Sault across several albums, including 11 which in May 2023 won the Ivor Novello Award for "Best Album". Peñate, alongside producer Inflo and vocalists Cleo Sol and Chronixx, were joint recipients of the award.

In November 2023, Sault announced their first live performance, teasing that they would play an unreleased album of material. The tour began on 14 December in London, with Peñate featuring as a guest performer. The show included songs from then-unreleased album Acts of Faith.

In June 2024, Peñate appeared on stage playing guitar with Little Simz at the 2024 Glastonbury Festival.

Beyond his music career, Jack is also part of the creative collective Group of Humans.

== Discography ==
=== Albums ===
Title	Album details	Peak chart positions	
Title	Album details	UK	UK Indie
Matinée	Released: 8 October 2007; Label: XL	7	1
Everything Is New	Released: 22 June 2009; Label: XL	16	2
After You	Released: 29 November 2019; Label: XL	—	15
Wondrous Strange	Released: 7 January 2024; Label: 77	—	—

=== Singles ===
Title	Year	Peak chart positions		Album
Title	Year	UK	UK Indie	Album
"Second, Minute or Hour"	2006	17	1	Matinée
"Spit at Stars"	2006	—	—	Matinée
"Torn on the Platform"	2007	7	1	Matinée
"Have I Been a Fool"	2007	73	3	Matinée
"Tonight's Today"	2009	23	1	Everything Is New
"Be the One"	2009	35	3	Everything Is New
"Pull My Heart Away"	2009	99	—	Everything Is New
"Prayer"	2019	—	—	After You
"Not Enough"	2020	—	—	Non-album singles
"No Law"	2020	—	—	Non-album singles
"No One Died"	2020	—	—	Non-album singles
"Remember in New York"	2020	—	—	Non-album singles
"Crumbs"	2021	—	—	Non-album singles
"Scars"	2022	—	—	Non-album singles

=== Songwriting and production credits ===
Title	Year	Artist	Album	Songwriter	Producer	
Title	Year	Artist	Album	Songwriter	Primary	Secondary
"Bitter Streets"	2021	Sault	Nine	check		
"Fear"	2021	Sault	Nine	check		
"Above the Sky"	2022	Sault	Today & Tomorrow	check		
"Heal the World"	2022	Sault	Today & Tomorrow	check		
"In the Beginning"	2022	Sault	Today & Tomorrow	check		
"Lion"	2022	Sault	Today & Tomorrow	check		
"Money"	2022	Sault	Today & Tomorrow	check		
"Run"	2022	Sault	Today & Tomorrow	check		
"The Greatest Smile"	2022	Sault	Today & Tomorrow	check		
"The Jungle"	2022	Sault	Today & Tomorrow	check		
"The Plan"	2022	Sault	Today & Tomorrow	check		
"The Return"	2022	Sault	Today & Tomorrow	check		
"Fields"	2022	Sault	Earth	check		
"Life We Rent But Love Is Rent Free"	2022	Sault	Untitled (God)	check		
"Love Will Free Your Mind"	2022	Sault	Untitled (God)	check		
"We Are Gods"	2022	Sault	Untitled (God)	check		
"Angel"	2022	Sault	Angel	check		
"Envious"	2022	Sault	11	check		
"Fear No One"	2022	Sault	11	check		
"Fight for Love"	2022	Sault	11	check		
"Glory"	2022	Sault	11	check		
"Higher"	2022	Sault	11	check		
"In the Air"	2022	Sault	11	check		
"Jack’s Gift"	2022	Sault	11	check		
"Morning Sun"	2022	Sault	11	check		
"River"	2022	Sault	11	check		
"The Circle"	2022	Sault	11	check		
"Together"	2022	Sault	11	check		
"Intro"	2023	Jayda G	Guy	check		check
"Blue Lights"	2023	Jayda G	Guy	check		check
"Heads or Tails"	2023	Jayda G	Guy	check		check
"Scars"	2023	Jayda G	Guy	check		check
"Interlude: I Got Tired of Running"	2023	Jayda G	Guy	check		check
"Lonely Back in O"	2023	Jayda G	Guy	check		check
"Your Thoughts"	2023	Jayda G	Guy	check		check
"Interlude: It Was Beautiful"	2023	Jayda G	Guy	check		check
"Meant to Be"	2023	Jayda G	Guy	check		check
"Circle Back Around"	2023	Jayda G	Guy	check		check
"When She Dance"	2023	Jayda G	Guy	check		check
"Sapphires of Gold"	2023	Jayda G	Guy	check		check
"15 Foot"	2023	Jayda G	Guy	check		check
"Airplane"	2023	Cleo Sol	Heaven	check		
"Love Will Lead You There"	2023	Cleo Sol	Heaven	check		
"Movie Love"	2023	Dead Mary	Single	check	check	
"No Time" (feat. Jack Peñate)	2023	Django Django	Off Planet	check		
"Lover, You Should've Come Over"	2023	Elmiene	Single		check	
"If We Only Knew" (from the documentary film Blue Carbon)	2024	Jayda G	Single	check		check
"Highwood House"	2024	Sam Morton	Daffodils & Dirt	check		check
"Purple Yellow"	2024	Sam Morton	Daffodils & Dirt	check		check
"Cry Without End"	2024	Sam Morton	Daffodils & Dirt	check		check
"Sharing My Body"	2024	Treanne	20/20			check
"It's Ur Birthday"	2024	Treanne	20/20			check
"Please"	2024	Treanne	20/20	check		check
"Reasons"	2024	Treanne	20/20	check		check
"A Cloud Never Dies"	2024	Plum Village Band	A Cloud Never Dies	check		check
"A Prayer for Land"	2024	Plum Village Band	A Cloud Never Dies	check		check
"Interlude"	2024	Plum Village Band	A Cloud Never Dies	check		check
"Invocation"	2024	Plum Village Band	A Cloud Never Dies	check		check
"Convocation"	2024	Plum Village Band	A Cloud Never Dies	check		check
"Thay Ol"	2024	Plum Village Band	A Cloud Never Dies	check		check
"Arrived"	2024	Plum Village Band	A Cloud Never Dies	check		check
"Don't Wait"	2024	Plum Village Band	A Cloud Never Dies	check		check
"Recommendation"	2024	Plum Village Band	A Cloud Never Dies	check		check
"Paradise State of Mind"	2024	Foster the People	Paradise State of Mind	check		

== Awards and nominations ==
Year	Association	Category	Nominated work	Result	Ref.
2023	Ivor Novello	Best Album	11	Won	
