= List of UK Independent Singles Chart number ones of 2007 =

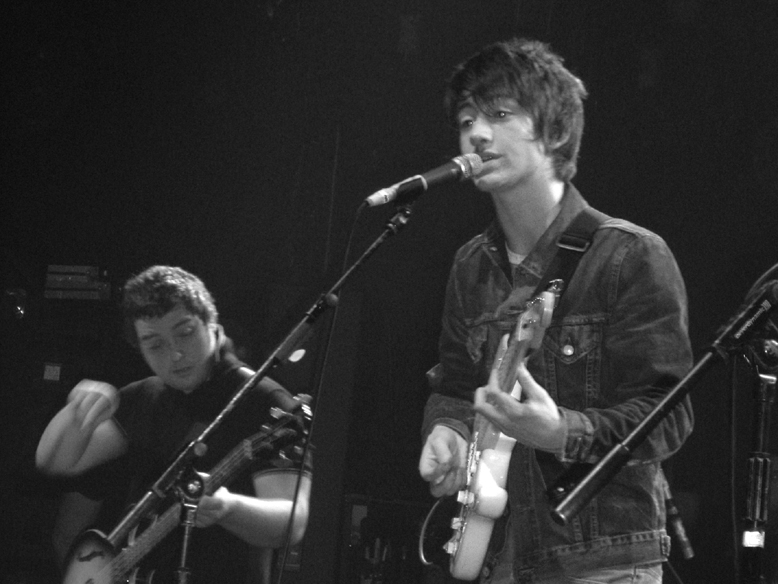
British band Arctic Monkeys reached number one on the UK Indie Chart with three different singles, and spent a total of eight weeks at the top.

The UK Indie Chart is a weekly chart that ranks the biggest-selling singles that are released on independent record labels in the United Kingdom. The chart is compiled by the Official Charts Company, and is based on both physical and digital single sales. During 2007, 37 singles reached number one.

The biggest-selling indie hit of the year was "Brianstorm" by Arctic Monkeys, which sold over 104,000 copies during 2007, topped the indie chart for four weeks and reached number two on the UK Singles Chart. Other high-selling indie hits 2007 included "Heavyweight Champion of the World" by Reverend and The Makers, which sold approximately 97,000 singles, and "Fluorescent Adolescent" by Arctic Monkeys, which sold more than 96,000 copies.

Eight acts managed to top the UK Indie Chart more than once. They were: Good Shoes, Arctic Monkeys, Elliot Minor, The Pigeon Detectives, Reverend and The Makers, The White Stripes, Jack Peñate and Dizzee Rascal.

Chart-topping singles from the 2007 UK Indie Chart also included "My Baby Left Me", which was re-released by HMV to commemorate the 30th anniversary of the death of Elvis Presley, and topped the chart 51 years after it was first released. Another highlight was "Life's a Treat", the theme tune to the BBC children's TV programme Shaun the Sheep, sung by comedian Vic Reeves, which topped the indie chart in December.

== Chart history ==
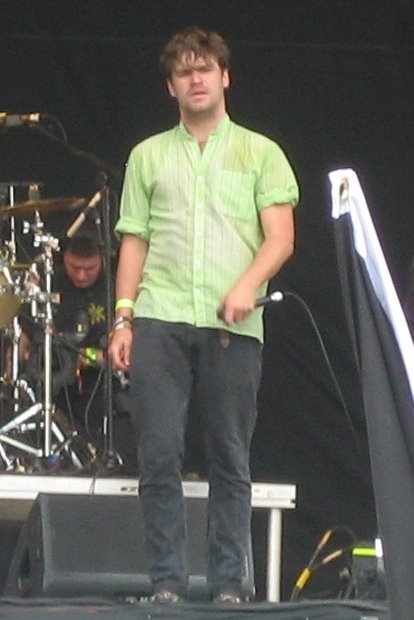
Jack Peñate topped the UK Indie Chart twice, with his singles "Torn on the Platform" and "Second, Minute or Hour".

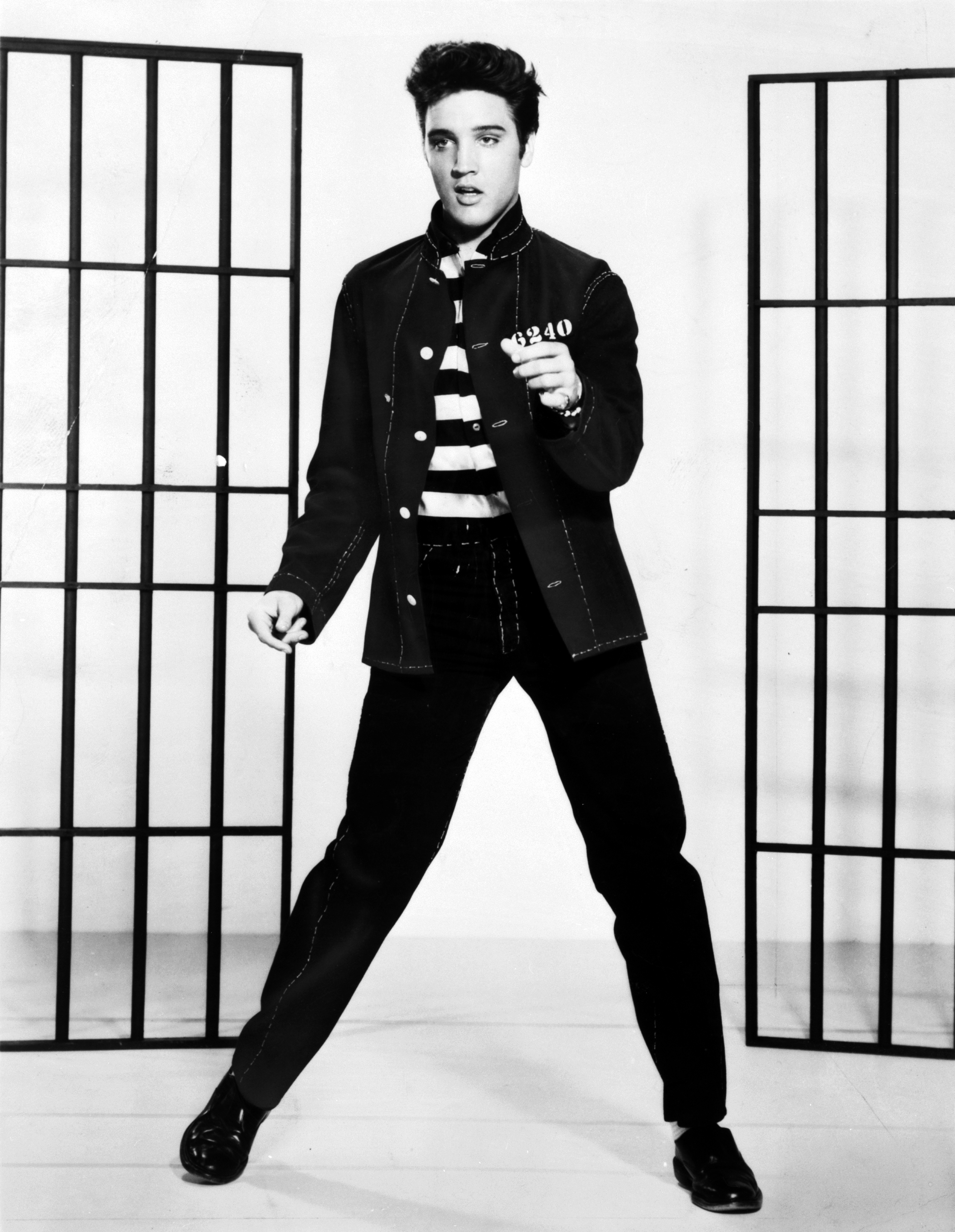
Elvis Presley achieved a posthumous indie number one in 2007 with "My Baby Left Me".

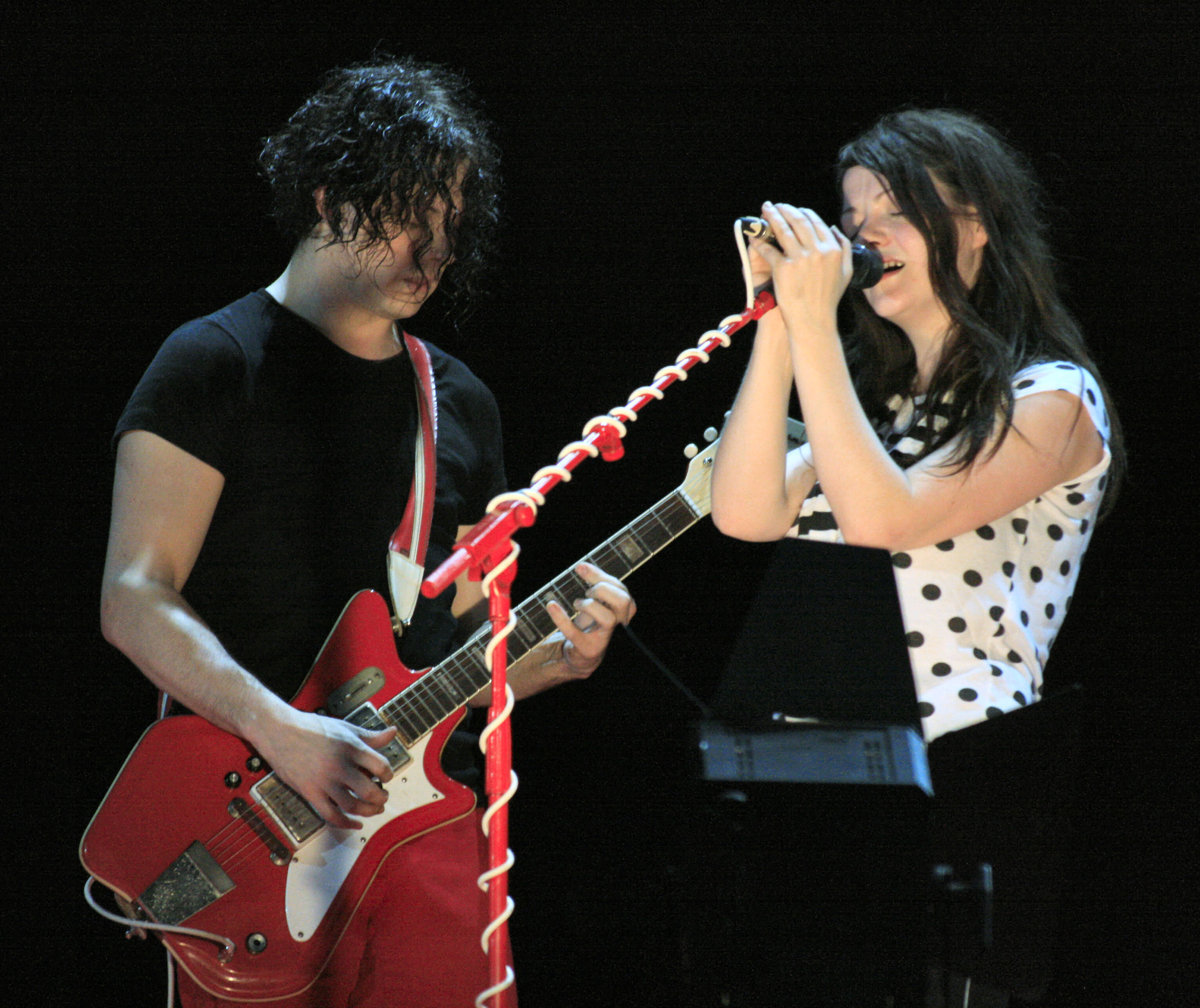
The White Stripes topped the UK Indie Chart twice during 2007.

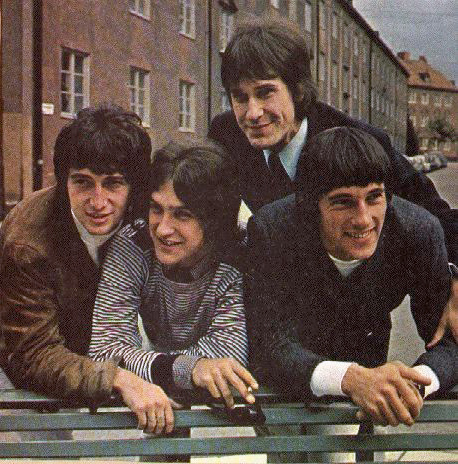
"Waterloo Sunset" by The Kinks reached number one on the UK Indie Chart forty years after it was originally released.

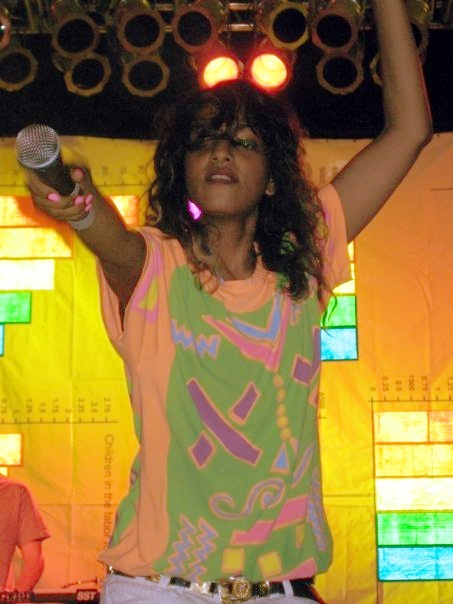
M.I.A. topped the chart with her single "Jimmy".

Key
†	Best-selling indie single of the year

Issue date	Song	Artist(s)	Record label	Ref.
7 January	"The Photos on My Wall"	Good Shoes	Brille	
14 January	"Don't Let Him Waste Your Time"	Jarvis Cocker	Rough Trade	
21 January	"Rain Down Love"	Freemasons featuring Siedah Garrett	Loaded	
28 January	"Rain Down Love"	Freemasons featuring Siedah Garrett	Loaded	
4 February	"Rain Down Love"	Freemasons featuring Siedah Garrett	Loaded	
11 February	"Giddy Stratospheres"	The Long Blondes	Rough Trade	
18 February	"I'm a Rat"	Towers of London	TVT	
25 February	"Dare Me (Stupidisco)"	Junior Jack featuring Shena	Defected	
4 March	"Standing in the Way of Control"	Gossip	Back Yard	
11 March	"Anything Can Happen in the Next Half Hour"	Enter Shikari	Ambush Reality	
18 March	"Never Meant to Hurt You"	Good Shoes	Brille	
25 March	"Our Velocity"	Maxïmo Park	Warp	
1 April	"Dancefloor"	The Holloways	TVT	
8 April	"Our Velocity"	Maxïmo Park	Warp	
15 April	"Parallel Worlds"	Elliot Minor	Repossession	
22 April	"Brianstorm" †	Arctic Monkeys	Domino	
29 April	"Brianstorm" †	Arctic Monkeys	Domino	
6 May	"Brianstorm" †	Arctic Monkeys	Domino	
13 May	"Brianstorm" †	Arctic Monkeys	Domino	
20 May	"Waterloo Sunset"	The Kinks	Castle	
27 May	"I'm Not Sorry"	The Pigeon Detectives	Dance to the Radio	
3 June	"Heavyweight Champion of the World"	Reverend and The Makers	Wall of Sound	
10 June	"Sound of Freedom"	Bob Sinclar featuring Gary Pine and Dollarman	Defected	
17 June	"Icky Thump"	The White Stripes	XL	
24 June	"Icky Thump"	The White Stripes	XL	
1 July	"Torn on the Platform"	Jack Peñate	XL	
8 July	"Torn on the Platform"	Jack Peñate	XL	
15 July	"Fluorescent Adolescent"	Arctic Monkeys	Domino	
22 July	"Fluorescent Adolescent"	Arctic Monkeys	Domino	
29 July	"Fluorescent Adolescent"	Arctic Monkeys	Domino	
5 August	"Pussyole (Old Skool)"	Dizzee Rascal	XL	
12 August	"Jessica"	Elliot Minor	Repossession	
19 August	"Take Her Back"	The Pigeon Detectives	Dance to the Radio	
26 August	"My Baby Left Me"	Elvis Presley	Memphis	
2 September	"My Baby Left Me"	Elvis Presley	Memphis	
9 September	"He Said He Loved Me"	Reverend and The Makers	Wall of Sound	
16 September	"You Don't Know What Love Is (You Just Do as You're Told)"	The White Stripes	XL	
23 September	"We Apologise for Nothing"	Fightstar	Institute	
30 September	"Second, Minute or Hour"	Jack Peñate	XL	
7 October	"Jimmy"	M.I.A.	XL	
14 October	"Crocodile"	Underworld	Underworldlive.com	
21 October	"Take Off"	Jack Rokka vs. Betty Boo	Gusto	
28 October	"Hold My Hand"	Unkle	Surrender-All	
4 November	"Run-Away"	Super Furry Animals	Rough Trade	
11 November	"Run-Away"	Super Furry Animals	Rough Trade	
18 November	"I Found Out"	The Pigeon Detectives	Dance to the Radio	
25 November	"Flex"	Dizzee Rascal	XL	
2 December	"Flex"	Dizzee Rascal	XL	
9 December	"Teddy Picker"	Arctic Monkeys	Domino	
16 December	"Life's a Treat"	Shaun the Sheep	Tug	
23 December	"Life's a Treat"	Shaun the Sheep	Tug	
30 December	"Life's a Treat"	Shaun the Sheep	Tug	

== See also ==
- List of UK Dance Singles Chart number ones of 2007
- List of UK Singles Downloads Chart number ones of the 2000s
- List of UK Rock & Metal Singles Chart number ones of 2007
- List of UK Singles Chart number ones of the 2000s
