= Chronixx =

Jamaican reggae musician (born 1992)

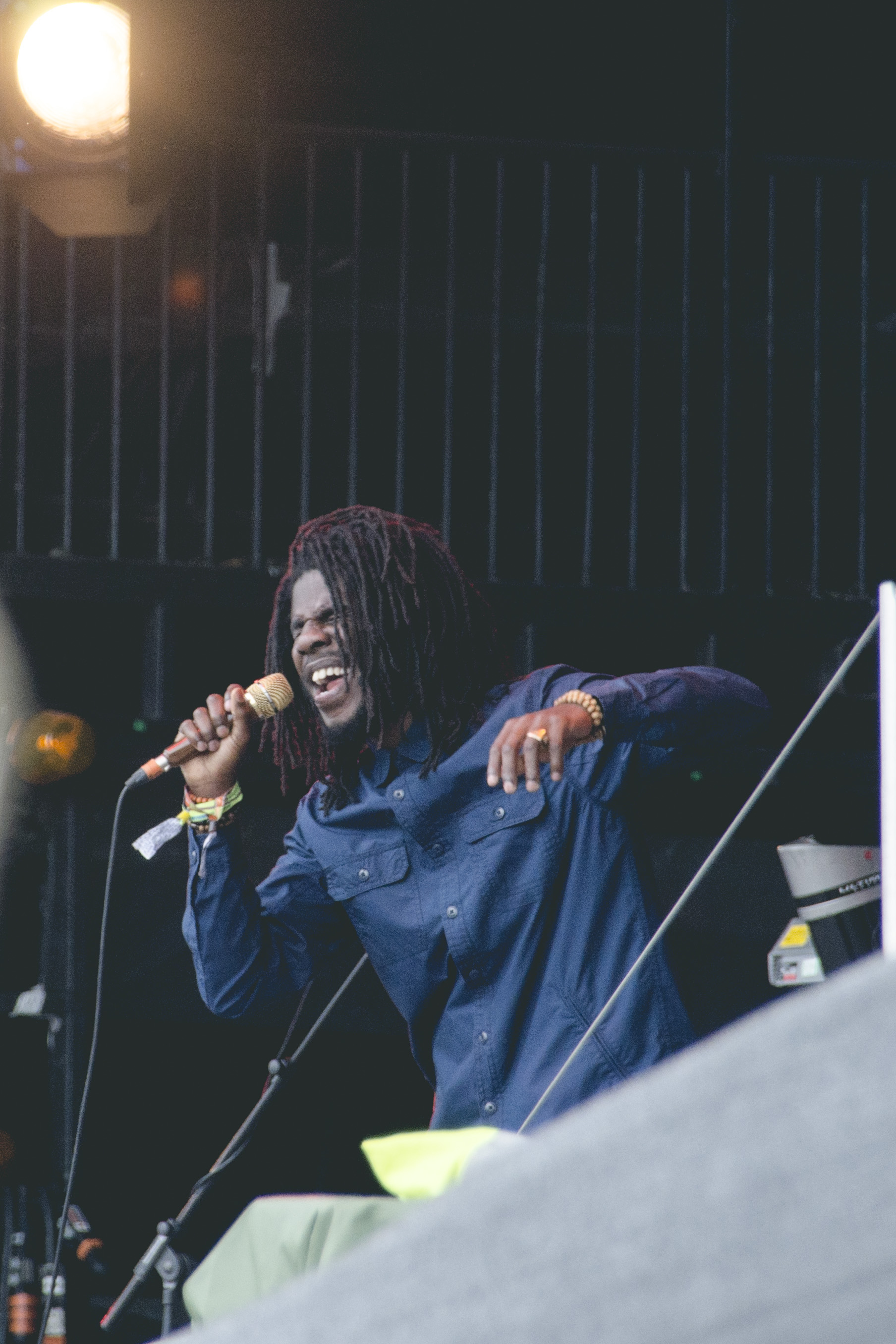
- Chronixx performing live in 2015

Background information
- Born: Jamar Rolando McNaughton; 10 October 1992 (age 34); Spanish Town, St. Catherine, Jamaica
- Genres: Reggae hip hop; dancehall
- Occupations: Singer; songwriter
- Years active: 2010–present
- Label: Soul Circle
Member of
- Website: www.chronixx.com

Jamar Rolando McNaughton (born 10 October 1992), popularly known as Chronixx, is a Jamaican reggae artist and a member of the UK-based music collective Sault. His stage name replaced the name "Little Chronicle" which he was given because of his father, the singer "Chronicle". Chronixx and his music have been branded as a roots "Reggae Revival", alongside other reggae musicians including Dre Island, Jah Bouks, Jah9, Protoje, Kelissa, Jesse Royal, Keznamdi, Kabaka Pyramid and Lila Iké. His lyrical content includes anti-war sentiments, romantic declarations and messages of resilience.

== Early life ==
Jamar began songwriting at an early age and his father Selvin McNaughton, known professionally as "Chronicle", began to nurture his musical aspirations. McNaughton wrote his first song, "Rice Grain", at the age of 5. During an interview with Okay Player, Chronixx spoke on his early life:

"My music come from early beginnings, from childhood days. I used to sing at school, in church, and then my whole family sings. My daddy, Chronicle, caused me to be very exposed to music from a very tender age. That’s where the music started for me. Professionally now, that’s when I was in high school. I started producing. Making riddims. But the music go from then until now. When I was 15, 16 I started producing and it was a great vibe for me."

He attended St Catherine High School in Spanish Town. He started his recording career at the age of 11, recording a Gospel track with producer Danny Browne (which was not released), and went on to provide harmony vocals for artists such as Lutan Fyah as well as beginning production work, composing rhythms used by artists such as Konshens, Popcaan, and Munga Honorable for Mavrick Records. At the age of 14, he began producing and building riddims, including the Freezer riddim for Ice Box Records. In 2009 Chronixx's younger brother died which led to him writing with Romaine 'Teflon' Arnett of Zincfence Records.

== Career ==
Chronixx's popularity grew throughout 2012, with significant airplay in Jamaica, and performances at festivals such as Reggae Sumfest and a show in December at the Tracks and Records nightclub/restaurant in Kingston, which was attended by Usain Bolt. He was featured on the Major Lazer-curated mixtape Start a Fire. In 2013, he had hits with "Smile Jamaica" and "Here Comes Trouble", and he toured the United Kingdom (including a BBC 1Xtra concert in Leeds) and the United States with his Zincfence Redemption Band. In March 2013, he travelled to Kenya, where he has a large fanbase, as a Peace Ambassador during the country's general election, and performed at the Tuko Rada Peace Concert in Nairobi. He again performed at Sumfest in 2013, in front of an audience of more than 10,000.

His EP, Dread & Terrible, was released on 1 April 2014, and topped the Billboard Top Reggae Albums charts on the week of 18 April. Following his appearance on the Jimmy Fallon show and his Central Park concert, the EP saw significant gains, according to Nielsen SoundScan, earning a number two position on the Digital Reggae Singles chart. The EP returned to the number one spot on the Top Reggae Albums chart, according to SoundScan. By March 2015, the EP had spent 42 consecutive weeks in the top 10 of the Top Reggae Albums chart.

In February 2014 Chronixx was featured on Protoje's single "Who Knows", the lead single of the album Ancient Future. The single was later certified Silver by BPI (British Phonographic Industry) in 2022.

In May 2014, he won Culture Artist of the Year, Best New Artist, and Entertainer of the Year at the Linkage Awards in New York. In July 2014, he performed on The Tonight Show Starring Jimmy Fallon on US network NBC. He followed this with a concert in Central Park attended by over 5,000 people. In September 2014, he was nominated for a MOBO Award in the Best Reggae Act category. The following month he won awards for Best Song (for "Smile Jamaica") and Best Music Video (for "Here Comes Trouble") at the 33rd International Reggae & World Music Awards. He founded his own ZincFence Recordz production house along with producer Romain "Teflon" Arnett and co-producer/engineer Ricardo "Shadyz" Lynch. As well as Chronixx, ZincFence has produced hits by Jah Cure, Kabaka Pyramid, and Protoje, and had worked with Maverick Sabre, Mavado, and Nomaddz.

In January 2015, Chronixx appeared on "Belly of the Beast" a song which featured on American rapper Joey Badass debut album B4.Da.$$. In June 2015, Chronixx performed at the Glastonbury Festival.

In February 2017, Chronixx returned to The Tonight Show Starring Jimmy Fallon for the first time since his 2014 U.S. television debut, performing the singles "Majesty" and "Likes" from his forthcoming debut album, Chronology. Chronology was released on July 7, 2017, and later received a Grammy Award nomination for Best Reggae Album at the 60th Annual Grammy Awards in 2018. In the same year, he received a Prime Minister's National Youth Award for Excellence.

On 13 March 2020, Chronixx released the first single "Dela Move" from his upcoming second album, "Dela Splash". The title of the track and album were inspired by his hometown – De La Vega City, a district in Spanish Town, Jamaica. Despite the anticipation, the album was never released.

Chronixx maintained a low public profile between 2020 and 2025, releasing little solo material and making few public appearances. His absence from the mainstream reggae scene during this period led to widespread speculation among fans and media. While the reasons for his silence were never formally addressed, it was widely believed that he was focusing on personal growth and artistic exploration. His final solo release before this extended hiatus was the single “Never Give Up,” released in 2022.

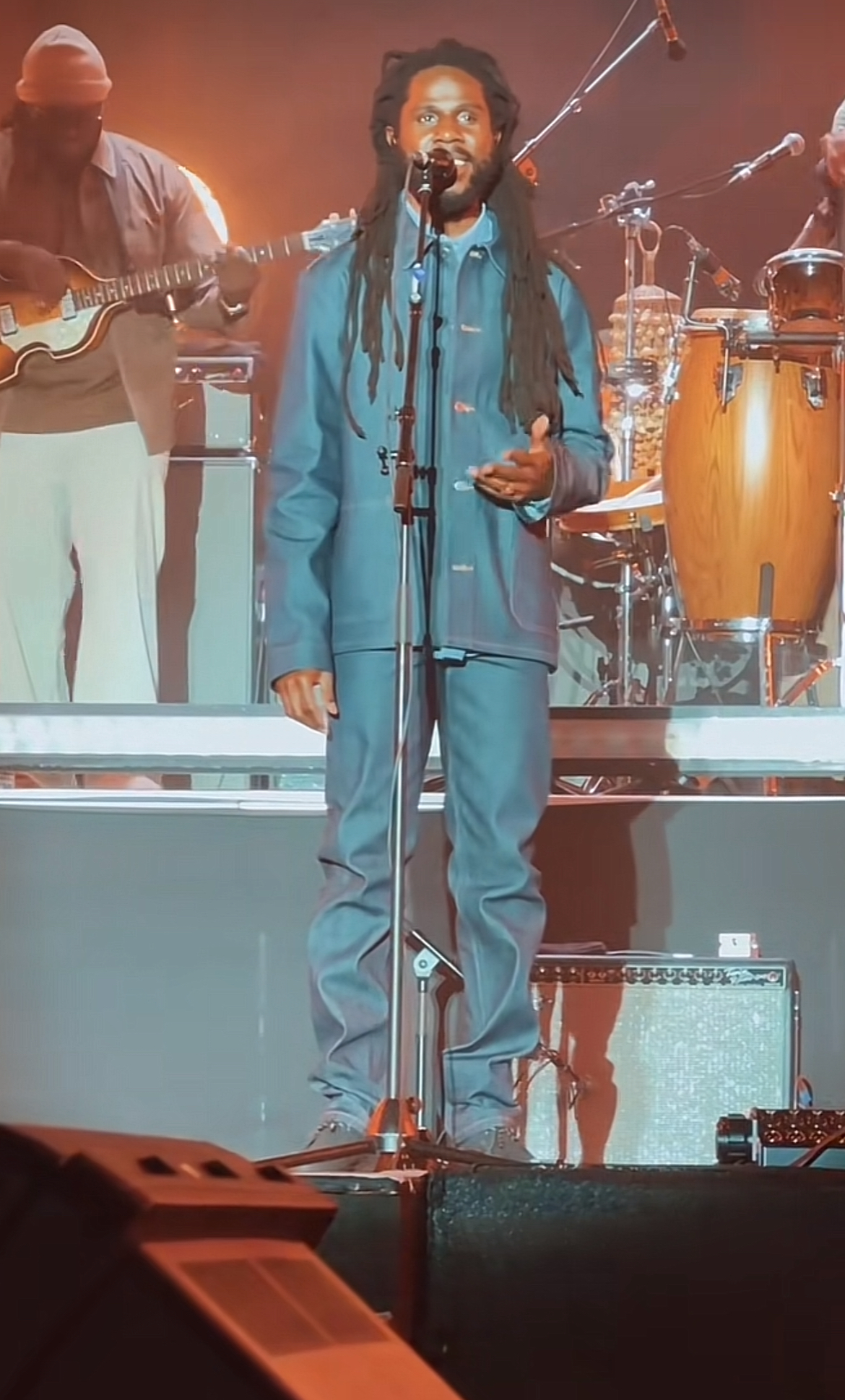
Chronixx performing live at Reggaeland, August 2025

While not releasing solo work during this period, Chronixx remained creatively active behind the scenes. In October 2020, he appeared as a featured artist on the track “Dark Horse” from Sa‑Roc’s album The Sharecropper’s Daughter. He also provided uncredited vocals on “Unstoppable” from Daniel Caesar’s album Never Enough (2023), "Reason" from Cleo Sol's album Gold (2023), and on “Tequan” from Smino’s album Maybe in Nirvana (2024), alongside Ravyn Lenae. Though uncredited, his vocal presence on these tracks was widely recognised by fans and music critics alike, reinforcing his continued relevance during his time away from the spotlight.

In addition to these collaborations, he made substantial contributions as a composer, lyricist, and songwriter on several albums by the UK-based collective Sault, including Earth, Today & Tomorrow, Untitled (God), 11, Acts of Faith, and 10. On 10, he is also credited with horn and guitar performances.

Chronixx made a few brief, impromptu appearances during this time. Notable moments include surprise performances at Protoje’s Lost in Time Festival in 2023, and the second annual Jo-Mersa Marley Birthday Celebration in 2025, both held in Jamaica. He also made a handful of rare live appearances around the island, maintaining a quiet presence in the reggae scene.

On August 3, 2025, Chronixx made a significant return to the stage as the main headliner of Reggaeland, a two-day festival held at the Milton Keynes National Bowl. He closed out the event with a powerful performance, marking his first major public appearance in several years. During this set, he announced plans to release a new album titled Exile later that year. Exile later won Reggae Album of the Year at the 2026 Caribbean Music Awards.

== Philanthropy and Education Initiatives ==
In July 2022, Chronixx and his team launched the JamCoders Summer Camp, a fully funded, four-week residential programme in algorithms and computer programming for academically strong Jamaican high school students in Forms 3–5 (Grades 9–11). Hosted at the University of the West Indies, Mona in Kingston, Jamaica, the camp is modelled after the AddisCoder programme in Ethiopia and offers free accommodation, meals, and daily instruction from lecturers and teaching assistants from institutions such as Harvard University, the University of California, Berkeley, and the University of the West Indies.

The JamCoders syllabus covers topics including algorithms, discrete mathematics, and coding, and incorporates project-based learning and educational excursions to encourage practical application of concepts. The camp accepts students from across Jamaica through a competitive application process, and participants are selected based on academic performance, problem-solving ability, and interest in technology.

Since its inception, JamCoders has graduated over 150 students representing all 14 parishes of Jamaica. Alumni have gone on to pursue further studies in computer science, engineering, and related fields. The initiative is funded through Chronixx’s Caring Hands of Rastafari (CHOR) Foundation, with additional sponsorship from the NCB Foundation, Digicel Foundation, JPS Foundation, JMMB Group, Grid Dynamics, D.E. Shaw, and other partners. Chronixx has stated that the camp aims to give young Jamaicans access to advanced technical education, bridge the digital skills gap, and inspire them to contribute to the country’s technology sector.

== Discography ==
=== Albums ===
Title	Album details	Peak chart positions
Title	Album details	US Reg.
Chronology	Released: 7 July 2017; Label: Soul Circle Music; Format: CD, LP, digital download	1
Exile	Released: 10 October 2025; Label: Forever Living Originals; Format: LP, Digital download	—

=== Mixtapes ===
- Start a Fire (2012) – with Major Lazer and Walshy Fire
- Roots & Chalice (2016) – with Federation Sound, Soul Circle Music
- ODD Ras (2013) – Frenchman Promotion

=== EPs ===
List of EPs, with selected details and chart positions
Title	EP details	Peak chart positions	
Title	EP details	US	US Reg.
Hooked on Chronixx	Released: 2011; Label: Zincfence; Format: Digital download	–	–
Dread & Terrible	Released: 2014; Label: Chronixx Music Group, bashment; Formats: Digital download, CD	179	1

=== Singles ===
- "Somewhere" (2012)
- "Start a Fyah" (2012)
- "Mi Alright" (2013)
- "Access Granted" (2013)
- "Alpha and Omega" (2013)
- "Most I" (2013)
- "Thanks and Praise" (2013)
- "Here Comes Trouble" (2013)
- "Selassie Souljahz" (2013)
- "Smile Jamaica" (2013)
- "Ain't No Giving In" (2013)
- "Rain Music" (2013)
- "Perfect Tree" (2014)
- "Prayer" (2014)
- "Play Some Roots" (2015)
- "Capture Land" (2015)
- "Ghetto People" (2015)
- "Light It Up" (2015)
- "Majesty" (2017)
- "Likes" (2017)
- "Skankin Sweet" (2017)
- "Ghetto Paradise" (2017)
- "Spanish Town Rockin" (2017)
- "Sweet Love" (2017)
- "Eternal Light" (2019)
- "Dela Move" (2020)
- "Same Prayer" (featuring Kabaka Pyramid) (2020)
- "Cool as the Breeze/Friday" (2020)
- "Safe n Sound" (2021)
- "So Brutal" (2021)
- "Television Is the Worst" (2021)
- "Freedom Fighter" (2021)
- "Never Give Up" (2022)
