= Angel (EP) =

EP by Sault
- Released: 10 October 2022
- Genre: Reggae
- Length: 10:10
- Label: Forever Living Originals
- Producer: Inflo

Sault chronology
Air (2022)	Angel (2022)	11 (2022)

Angel, also known as 10, is a one-track EP from British funk band Sault, released on 10 October 2022, to positive critical reception.

== Critical reception ==
Jem Aswad of Variety praised the release for being part of Sault's history of innovative releases and characterizes different movements of the song as a "power-trio version of a Bob Marley song" followed by "a piano-led ballad... with a gorgeous soulful chorus" and ending in "a gentle acoustic song". In Paste, Rosa Sofia Kaminski also notes the three-act structure and praises the release for having a "story is told so intimately that it feels like it happened to someone you know".

== Track listing ==
1. "Angel" – 10:10

== Personnel ==
- Chronixx
- Inflo – production
- Jack Peñate

== Chart performance ==
Chart performance for "Angel"
Chart	Peak	Duration
United Kingdom (Official Charts): Singles Downloads	59	1 week
