= Aiir (EP) =

AIIR

EP by Sault
- Released: 1 November 2022
- Genre: Choral, contemporary classical
- Length: 25:27
- Label: Forever Living Originals
- Producer: Inflo

Sault chronology
11 (2022)	AIIR (2022)	Earth (2022)

AIIR is a studio EP by the British R&B collective Sault, a sequel to their sixth album, AIR (2022). The EP was one of five simultaneous digital releases for free on 1 November 2022 (along with 11, Earth, Today & Tomorrow, and Untitled (God)). Four of the five (excluding Untitled (God)) were released on streaming music services on 12 November. The download was available for only five days via a password-encrypted link and made as an offering to God.

== Critical reception ==
Professional ratings
Review scores
Source	Rating
The Daily Telegraph	4/5 stars
Gigwise	8/10 stars
The Observer	5/5 stars

Writing for The Daily Telegraph, Ali Shutler reviewed all five simultaneous releases by Sault and gave them a collective four out of five stars, noting that AIIR follows from the earlier Air that "conjures anxiety and paranoia through orchestral soundscapes". In an overview of the best music of the week on All Songs Considered, NPR considers the five releases "as sonically diverse as they are ambitious in their breadth and scale".

Damien Morris of The Observer reviewed all five albums and scored them five stars, noting that "anyone can find their own five-star classic among these 56 songs" and summing up that "it's clear that these albums are an act of supreme generosity, not indulgent superfluity". Writing for Gigwise, Luke Winstanley called the collective releases "an absurd achievement" and scored this album eight out of 10, calling it "another sumptuous classical effort [following Air], essentially functioning as a sequel or companion piece [that] presents a more focused, leaner and less indulgent collection than its predecessor".

== Track listing ==
1. "4am" – 4:48
2. "Hiding Moon" – 4:09
3. "Still Waters" – 5:20
4. "Gods Will" – 5:12
5. "5am" – 5:58
