= Untitled (Black Is) =

Third studio album by Sault

Studio album by Sault
- Released: 19 June 2020
- Genres: Soul; R&B; funk
- Length: 56:35
- Label: Forever Living Originals
- Producer: Inflo

Sault chronology
7 (2019)	Untitled (Black Is) (2020)	Untitled (Rise) (2020)

Untitled (Black Is) is the third studio album by the British R&B musical group Sault, released on 19 June 2020 through the independent record label Forever Living Legends. The album has been met with positive critical reception.

== Release ==
Untitled (Black Is) was released on 19 June 2020 by the independent record label Forever Living Legends. The album was originally available for free as a digital download, with proceeds from subsequent sales going to charity. Accompanying the release was a mission statement posted online by Sault, saying:

We present our first 'Untitled' album to mark a moment in time where we as Black People, and of Black Origin are fighting for our lives. RIP George Floyd and all those who have suffered from police brutality and systemic racism. Change is happening…We are focused.

The release was followed 13 weeks later by Untitled (Rise), a similarly composed and themed album.

== Critical reception ==
Professional ratings
Aggregate scores
Source	Rating
AnyDecentMusic?	8.0/10
Metacritic	86/100
Review scores
Source	Rating
AllMusic	4/5 stars
And It Don't Stop	(3-star Honorable Mention)
Louder Than War	4/5
Mojo	4/5 stars
The Philadelphia Inquirer	3.5/4 stars
Pitchfork	8.2/10
PopMatters	8/10
Q	4/5 stars

Untitled (Black Is) was met with widespread critical acclaim. At Metacritic, which assigns a normalized rating out of 100 to reviews from professional critics, the album received an average score of 86, based on 5 reviews.

Reviewing for AllMusic, Andy Kellman hailed Untitled (Black Is) as "an urgent outpouring of grief, anger, affirmation, and consolation, [that makes it seem that] virtually anything seems possible for their future". Marcus J. Moore of NPR noted that the lyrics explore the entirety of the black experience, including anger at the killing of African Americans by the police, sorrow in mourning, and the intimacy of daily life. Tom Doyle of Mojo called it "another masterwork from a group with no peers", and Q magazine's Steve Yates described it as "beautiful and potent stuff". Gordon Rutherford of Louder Than War regarded the album as a "zeitgeist" and the best of the year, a "powerful, potent protest album that is musically magnificent". Lizzie Manno of Paste also deemed it an "album-of-the-year contender" as well as "a revolutionary soundtrack to 2020". Salem Collo-Julin of Chicago Reader echoed these sentiments, calling this album the "soundtrack for the 2020 revolution" because the "revelatory jazz-soaked soul music on Untitled is a call to action". Writing for The Philadelphia Inquirer, Dan DeLuca called it "a seductive listen" whose powerful lyrics, coupled with a Juneteenth release and roots in several black music genres, "raise ... a fist against oppression and celebrates collective strength". Robert Christgau highlighted the songs "Stop Dem" and "Don't Shoot Guns Down" while summarising the music as "dancefloor positivity idealized and politicized, most militantly on [this] third album, which surfaced just in time for a BLM moment we're free to pray lasts approximately forever". BBC 6 Music named this album as their number one recommended album of 2020.

Accolades for Untitled (Black Is)
Issuer	Listing	Rank
Mojo	75 Best Albums of 2020	19
Uncut	Top 75 Albums of 2020	17
The Guardian	The Best Albums of 2020	5
NPR	The 50 Best Albums of 2020	1
BBC 6 Music	6 Music Recommends Albums of the Year 2020	1

"Wildfires" was ranked the fifth-best song of 2020 according to The Guardian.

== Track listing ==
1. "Out the Lies" (Kadeem Clarke, Dean Josiah Cover, Cleopatra Nikolic, and Melisa Young) – 2:01
2. "Stop Dem" (Cover and Nikolic) – 3:38
3. "Hard Life" (Cover, Michael Kiwanuka, and Nikolic) – 4:34
4. "Don't Shoot Guns Down" (Cover and Nikolic) – 1:53
5. "Wildfires" (Cover and Nikolic) – 3:27
6. "X" (Clarke, Cover, and Nikolic) – 1:24
7. "Sorry Ain't Enough" (Cover and Nikolic) – 5:00
8. "Black Is" (Clarke, Cover, and Nikolic) – 1:53
9. "Bow" (Cover and Kiwanuka) – 4:05
10. "This Generation" (Cover) – 0:47
11. "Why We Cry Why We Die" (Cover and Nikolic) – 2:44
12. "Black" (Cover and Nikolic) – 3:54
13. "US" (Clarke, Cover, Nikolic, and Young) – 1:06
14. "Eternal Life" (Clarke, Cover, and Nikolic) – 3:59
15. "Only Synth in Church" (Clarke and Cover) – 0:56
16. "Monsters" (Cover, Nikolic, and Young) – 3:28
17. "June Child" (Cover, Nikolic, and Young) – 0:59
18. "Miracles" (Cover, Nikolic, and Young) – 4:18
19. "Hold Me" (Cover and Nikolic) – 2:45
20. "Pray Up Stay Up" (Cover) – 3:45

== Chart performance ==
Chart performance for Untitled (Black Is)
Chart	Peak	Duration
United Kingdom (Official Charts): Album Downloads	13	3 weeks

== Personnel ==
Sault

- Kadeem Clarke
- Dean Josiah "Inflo" Cover
- Cleopatra "Cleo Sol" Nikolic
- Melisa "Kid Sister" Young

Additional musicians

- Laurette Josiah – vocals on "This Generation"
- Michael Kiwanuka – vocals on "Bow"
