= 10 (Sault album) =

Studio album by Sault
- Released: 19 April 2025
- Genre: Christian music; rhythm and blues
- Length: 43:16
- Label: Forever Living Originals
- Producer: Inflo

Sault chronology
Acts of Faith (2024)	10 (2025)	Chapter 1 (2026)

10 is the twelfth studio album from British R&B musical group Sault, released on 19 April 2025, on the band's own label Forever Living Originals. In line with gospel influences, 10 was released on Easter weekend, which followed the band's previous album Acts of Faith released on Christmas 2024.

The surprise release followed the band excerpts of four new tracks posted on 14 April on the band's Twitter and Instagram accounts.

== Reception ==
In Variety's opinion, Sault "outdid themselves" with "their best, or at least most accessible, album in years, a sumptuous serving of R&B filled with winks to ‘70s and ‘80s R&B and especially classic Michael Jackson".

For The Line of Best Fit, 10 is the band's "least remarkable record, from its messaging which has grown increasingly unrelatable outside of religious contexts".

For the music bloggers Shatter the Standards, "subtle instrumental layers build throughout [10], creating a sense of crescendo that mirrors the growing sense of empowerment conveyed in the writing. [...] This balance between lyrical content and musical arrangement showcases their ability to craft songs that resonate emotionally and sonically. Cleo Sol treats her voice less as a showpiece than a public service".

== Track listing ==
All tracks are written by Dean Cover and Cleopatra Nikolic, except where listed. Adapted from Tidal

10 streaming edition track listing
No.	Title	Writer(s)	Length
1.	"T.H."		4:46
2.	"R.L."		5:09
3.	"K.T.Y.W.S."		3:16
4.	"P"	Cover; Nikolic; Duane Atherley; Jamar McNaughton	4:32
5.	"I.L.T.S."	Cover; Nikolic; McNaughton	3:29
6.	"L.U."	Cover; Nikolic; Dave Okumu; Pino Palladino	4:04
7.	"S.I.T.L."	Cover; Nikolic; Joshua Lloyd-Watson; Lydia Kitto; Niji Adeleye	3:58
8.	"H.T.T.R."		4:16
9.	"W.A.L."		3:36
10.	"S.O.T.H."		6:03
Total length:			43:16

== Personnel ==
Credits adapted from Tidal.

=== Sault ===
- Inflo – keyboards, production, engineering (all tracks); background vocals (tracks 1–6, 10), mixing (1–3, 5–8), percussion (1–3, 8–10); piano, vocals (1, 10); synthesizer (2–4), drums (2, 3, 5, 8, 9), guitar (2, 3, 8–10), bass guitar (3, 5, 8–10)
- Cleo Sol – vocals, background vocals

=== Additional musicians ===
- Chronixx – horn (1, 2, 5, 7), guitar (4)
- Okiel McIntyre – trumpet (1, 2, 5, 7), horn (1, 5)
- Zoe McIntyre – flute (1, 2, 5, 7)
- Deshaun Fender – saxophone (1, 2, 5, 7)
- Oshane Love – saxophone (1, 2, 5, 7)
- Randy Fletcher – trombone (1, 2, 5, 7)
- James Williams – drums (1, 6, 10)
- Niji Adeleye – piano (1, 7, 10), keyboards (1, 10); organ, synthesizer (7)
- Rick James – bass guitar (1, 10)
- Pino Palladino – bass guitar (2, 3, 6)
- Dave Okumu – guitar (2, 6)
- Alecia Chakour – background vocals (2)
- Duane "Hurcs" Atherley – bass guitar (4)
- Nathan Allen – drums (4)
- Jack Peñate – guitar (4)
- Graham Godfrey – percussion (4)
- Eric Hagstrom – drums, percussion (7)
- Lydia Kitto – guitar, bass guitar (7)
- Joshua Lloyd-Watson – guitar (7)

=== Technical ===
- Richard Woodcraft – engineering (7, 10), mixing (4, 9, 10)
- Tesfa Winckler – engineering (1–3, 6–10), mixing (6)
- Fabian Perez – engineering (2), engineering assistance (1, 4, 10)
- Beatriz Artola – engineering (4)
- Tommy Bosustow – engineering assistance (4, 7, 9, 10)
- Eduardo Vargas – engineering assistance (4)
- Barnabas Poffley – engineering assistance (7)
- Matt Colton – mastering

== Charts ==
Chart performance for 10
Chart (2025)	Peak position
Scottish Albums (OCC)	83
UK Album Downloads (OCC)	24
UK Independent Albums (OCC)	33
UK Physical Albums (OCC)	98
UK R&B Albums (OCC)	4

== See also ==
- 2025 in British music
