= Acts of Faith (album) =

Studio album by Sault
- Released: 6 July 2024
- Genre: Christian music; R&B; Progressive Soul
- Length: 32:09
- Label: Forever Living Originals
- Producer: Inflo

Sault chronology
Untitled (God) (2022)	Acts of Faith (2024)	10 (2025)

Singles from Acts of Faith
- 1. "Pray for Me" Released: 20 December 2024

Acts of Faith is the eleventh studio album from British R&B musical group Sault. Mixed as a gapless, continuous segue of songs, the album was originally released, for free, as a single .WAV track via digital distribution on 6 July 2024. It appeared on streaming platforms on Christmas Day 25 December 2024.

Acts of Faith was originally previewed in December 2023 at the group's first performance, a one-night only concert in London On 20 December 2024, the track "Pray for Me", the album's coda, was released as the single. In April 2025, the album's vinyl edition was released.

== Reception ==
The live debut of Acts of Faith was met with positive reviews from critics and featured the musicians in masks, accompanied by ballet and fashion show performances, with this music accompanied by songs from across their career and a seven-song African Section that led into it. In The Daily Telegraph, Ali Shutler rated the show 5 out of 5 stars, stating that it was "part fashion show, part otherworldly escape, the first chunk of Sault's near-three hour concert began with a handful of the collective's more ethereal numbers as figures marched up and down the main runway".

In The Evening Standard, El Hunt also gave this show 5 out of 5 stars, calling it the live event of the year, stating that "calling what unfolded next a plain old 'gig' feels disingenuous; like referring to an all you can eat buffet as a 'light snack', or calling the Sistine Chapel a decent bit of interior design". Stevie Chick of The Guardian gave the show five out of five stars and wrote that "their eclecticism is dazzling but grounded in substance, their anthems aiming at the feet and the heart with equal accuracy" making for an "immersive, eclectic, astonishing three hours".

Upon the album's release, Bill Pearis of BrooklynVegan called this "yet another stunner" from the group that is "a joyous rumination on faith". Writing for Radio New Zealand, Tony Stamp noted the religious themes and uplifting lyrics in the music and responded to the band's mystique by summing up, "everything on record is so substantive, and enriching, that the gimmicks feel justified". Several outlets have noted that the music in the download matches the setlist from the live debut.

== Track listing ==
The download of Acts of Faith was paired with this graphic which includes a shot of a video projection from the band's live performance.

All tracks are written by Dean Cover and Cleopatra Nikolic, except "I Look for You" which was co-written with Jamar McNaughton.

1. "I Look for You" – 3:11
2. "Set Your Spirit Free" – 2:52
3. "God Will Help You Heal" – 2:55
4. "Heal" – 2:05
5. "Soul Clean" – 1:30
6. "The Lesson Is Over" – 5:29
7. "Someone to Love You" – 3:01
8. "Signs" – 3:48
9. "Pray for Me" – 7:14

== Personnel ==
Credits adapted from Tidal.

=== Sault ===
- Inflo – vocals, production, mixing, engineering
- Cleo Sol – vocals
- Chronixx – vocals

=== Additional contributor ===
- Guy Davie – mastering

== Charts ==
Chart performance for Acts of Faith
Chart (2025)	Peak position
Scottish Albums (OCC)	80
UK Independent Albums (OCC)	26

== See also ==
- 2023 in British music
- 2024 in rhythm and blues
