= After You (album) =

Studio album by Jack Peñate
- Released: 29 November 2019
- Genres: Pop; electropop; blue-eyed soul
- Length: 40:19
- Label: XL
- Producers: Jack Peñate; Alex Epton; Inflo; Paul Epworth

Jack Peñate chronology
Everything Is New (2009)	After You (2019)

After You is the third studio album by English singer-songwriter Jack Peñate, released on 29 November 2019 through XL Recordings. It was Peñate's first album in 10 years, following 2009's Everything Is New. Peñate co-produced the album with Alex Epton, Inflo and Paul Epworth. The album was preceded by the single "Prayer".

== Background ==
Peñate estimated that in the 10 years between Everything Is New and After You, he wrote "well over a thousand" songs, telling Apple Music: "I think I've probably done four [albums] where I thought, 'This is it. I've got this thing.'" He also explained "at least one" completed album was lost in a fire, and that he experienced writer's block and personal problems. Peñate also wanted to learn how to make an album entirely himself, initially estimating that it would take "four years", although it "took a lot longer than expected".

He also travelled to the US, playing with the xx in New York City and then "just didn't come home", as well as Peru, which helped to inspire "Swept to the Sky". A press release described Peñate's time away as being spent "indulging in mind-expanding ritual, studying writers and poets like Hesse, Rilke and Huxley alike and looking to mysticism and mythology for answers" that inspired the "semi-religious experience" of the album.

== Critical reception ==
Professional ratings
Aggregate scores
Source	Rating
Metacritic	75/100
Review scores
Source	Rating
AllMusic	3.5/5 stars
The Arts Desk	3/5 stars
DIY	3.5/5 stars
Evening Standard	3/5 stars
The Guardian	3/5 stars
musicOMH	3/5 stars
NME	4/5 stars
Paste	8.7/10

On review aggregator Metacritic, After You received a score 75 out of 100 based on eight critics' reviews, indicating "generally favorable" reception. Steven Edelstone of Paste rated the album 8.7 out of 10 and called it Peñate's "best album yet", deeming it "a pop record that's very cognizant of itself, aware of the gap between releases, but with a finger on our current musical pulse". Edelstone found the album to be "meticulous" with "dreamy and frequently cathartic soundscapes" that sound as if Peñate "spent years perfecting these 10 songs", making "the wait [...] worth it".

Rhian Daly of NME gave the album four out of five stars, remarking that Peñate "sounds full of confidence across the whole record, hopping from sound to sound, idea to idea", noting the gospel sound of "Prayer", the "low-key beats and glittering keys" of "GMT" and comparing the "atmosphere" of "Loaded Gun" to "a lost Lennon and McCartney composition". Daly concluded that the album is "full of experiments" and that the risk Peñate took paid off, judging that it sounds like "an artist rejuvenated and fired up". Jenessa Williams of DIY gave the album three-and-a-half stars out of five, finding the album to be "something of a fever dream, an electric span of ideas that flit from one to the other".

Ben Hogwood of musicOMH gave the record three stars out of five and wrote that one of Peñate's "assets is raw honesty". While feeling that the album has a "strong first half[, it] flags a little after this" and that it "plough[s] a relatively safe furrow in its construction and execution, but he is a very relatable singer, and the keenly felt blue-eyed soul on here should win him new converts". Writing for AllMusic, Marcy Donelson opined that the producers Peñate worked with on the record "significantly update his sound, opting for more expansive, choir-fortified arrangements and sleek electronics, bringing him into the home-studio era of electro-pop" and that it "marks an ambitious return for the long-absent musician, one that ultimately rewards with musicality".

Reviewing the album for The Arts Desk, Asya Draganova thought Peñate had "very audibly moved away from his original playful, naïve indie rock sound which led to his early success" and found it to be a "clear indication of a journey of learning in artistic self-sufficiency: singing, songwriting, production, and musicianship". Draganova termed After You an "intelligent pop album: too complex to belong to a generic category but also accessible to a wide audience", combining "a rich and professional yet stripped-back sound" that "emphasises Peñate's loyalty to a DIY approach" as an independent artist, yet with little of "the original raw energy and fun rock guitar riffs that initially brought recognition and chart success to Peñate a decade or so ago".

Writing for The Guardian, Michael Hann described After You as a "tasteful record – at times it's exactly the soft, melancholy, adult house pop they play in the chic bar at 7pm in every Netflix drama you've ever watched – but it's also got tunes, and Peñate has also finally lost all his vocal mannerisms, so you're not distracted from those tunes". Giving the album three out of five stars, Hann felt that ultimately the album "sounds a little cautious and contained, like a high-end beige sofa, so understated it blends into the background". David Smyth of the Evening Standard called the 10 songs an "eclectic, ambitious bunch" on which "Peñate is working hard, pushing his unremarkable voice to the point of distortion in places" and that while "nice to see him in action again", "whether most will remember him fondly enough to care is another matter".

== Track listing ==
After You track listing
No.	Title	Writer(s)	Length
1.	"Prayer"	Jack Peñate; Inflo	3:20
2.	"Loaded Gun"	Peñate	3:27
3.	"Round and Round"	Peñate; Paul Epworth	4:22
4.	"Cipralex"	Peñate	4:21
5.	"Murder"	Peñate; Inflo; Epworth	4:39
6.	"Gemini"	Peñate	3:05
7.	"Let Me Believe"	Peñate	4:17
8.	"GMT"	Peñate; Epworth	4:14
9.	"Ancient Skin"	Peñate	3:52
10.	"Swept to the Sky"	Peñate	4:42
Total length:			40:19

== Charts ==
Chart performance for After You
Chart (2019)	Peak position
UK Album Downloads (Official Charts)	77
UK Independent Albums (Official Charts)	15
UK Physical Albums (OCC)	84
