= 5 (Sault album) =

Studio album by Sault
- Released: 5 May 2019
- Genres: Funk, soul
- Length: 41:48
- Label: Forever Living Originals
- Producers: Tom Campbell; Inflo

Sault chronology
5 (2019)	7 (2019)

5 is the debut studio album from British R&B musical group Sault. The album has been met with positive critical reception.

== Critical reception ==
The editorial staff of AllMusic Guide gave 5 four out of five stars, designating it the "Best of 2019", with reviewer Andy Kellman noting that "the highlights are numerous, equal in quantity to the approaches". In The Guardian, Alexis Petridis reviewed both 5 and 7, giving them each five stars out of five, writing that both are "fantastic, walking an idiosyncratic path that zig-zags between ESG-esque post-punk funk, early 80s boogie and something approaching neo-soul, without ever really fitting into any of those categories or sounding like straightforward homage".

Citing their first two albums, Paste declared Sault one of the 15 new British bands that audiences should listen to in 2020.

Accolades for 5
Issuer	Listing	Rank
AllMusic Guide	Best of 2019	—N/a
Bandcamp	The Best Albums of 2019	2

== Track listing ==
1. "Up All Night" (Dean Josiah Cover and Cleopatra Nikolic) – 4:16
2. "Don’t Waste My Time" (Cover and Melisa Young) – 3:15
3. "Foot on Necks" (Cover and Nikolic) – 3:12
4. "Why Why Why Why Why" (Cover and Nikolic) – 3:59
5. "Pink Sands" (Cover) – 1:52
6. "Let Me Go" (Cover and Nikolic) – 3:13
7. "Masterpiece" (Cover and Nikolic) – 5:45
8. "Add a Little Bit of SAULT" (Young) – 0:18
9. "Something’s in the Air" (Cover and Young) – 3:10
10. "Think About It" (Cover and Young) – 2:48
11. "Wild Hundreds, Pt. 5" (Cover) – 0:51
12. "We Are the Sun" (Cover) – 3:56
13. "Wild Hundreds, Pt. 55" (Cover and Nikolic) – 1:28
14. "B.A.B.E" (Cover and Nikolic) – 3:45

== Chart performance ==
"Let Me Go" spent one week on the Billboard Mexico Ingles Airplay chart at number 49.

== Personnel ==
Sault

- Kadeem Clarke
- Dean Josiah "Inflo" Cover
- Cleopatra "Cleo Sol" Nikolic
- Melisa "Kid Sister" Young

Technical personnel

- Tom Campbell – production
