= 7 (Sault album) =

Studio album by Sault
- Released: 27 September 2019
- Genre: Rhythm and blues
- Length: 33:57
- Label: Forever Living Originals
- Producer: Inflo

Sault chronology
5 (2019)	7 (2019)	Untitled (Black Is) (2020)

7 is the second studio album from British rhythm and blues musical group Sault. The album has been met with positive critical reception.

== Critical reception ==
In The Guardian, Alexis Petridis reviewed both 5 and 7, giving them each five stars out of five, writing that both are "fantastic, walking an idiosyncratic path that zig-zags between ESG-esque post-punk funk, early 80s boogie and something approaching neo-soul, without ever really fitting into any of those categories or sounding like straightforward homage". Reviewing the albums of the year for The Arts Desk, Barney Harsent gave 7 five out of five stars for writing compelling dance music but also deep soul music with "smooth intent and raw delivery" that are "as affecting combination as I’ve ever heard". In Q, Chris Catchpole scored this four out of five stars due to its mix of musical features and moods.

Citing their first two albums, Paste declared Sault one of the 15 new British bands that audiences should listen to in 2020.

Accolades for 7
Issuer	Listing	Rank
Bandcamp	The Best Albums of 2019	2

== Track listing ==
1. "Over" (Dean Josiah Cover and Cleopatra Nikolic) – 2:25
2. "No Bullshit" (Cover and Nikolic) – 3:47
3. "Feel So Good" (Cover and Nikolic) – 3:07
4. "Living in America" (Cover and Nikolic) – 3:21
5. "Tip Toe" (Cover and Nikolic) – 3:10
6. "Smile and Go" (Cover and Nikolic) – 2:44
7. "Threats" (Cover and Nikolic) – 4:21
8. "Red Lights" (Cover and Nikolic) – 3:04
9. "Friends" (Cover and Nikolic) – 3:58
10. "Waterfalls" (Cover and Nikolic) – 4:00

== Personnel ==
Sault

- Kadeem Clarke
- Dean Josiah "Inflo" Cover
- Cleopatra "Cleo Sol" Nikolic
- Melisa "Kid Sister" Young
