= Guy (Jayda G album) =

Studio album by Jayda G
- Released: 9 June 2023
- Genre: Electronic
- Length: 36:17
- Label: Ninja Tune
- Producer: Jayda G; Jack Peñate

Jayda G chronology
Significant Changes (2019)	Guy (2023)

Guy is the second studio album by Canadian musician Jayda G. It was released on 9 June 2023 through Ninja Tune. It received generally favorable reviews from critics.

== Background ==
Guy is Jayda G's first studio album since Significant Changes (2019). For the album's songs, she wrote the lyrics first and then composed the music. She started taking vocal lessons and sang on the album. It is co-produced with Jack Peñate.

The album's title refers to Jayda G's late father, William Richard Guy, who died when she was 10 years old. The album includes archival recordings from him. Before his death, he had videotaped himself talking about his life. In a 2023 interview, Jayda G explained, "Some of the words I'm singing are direct quotes my father was saying, and that's how I figured out what the samples would be in the album: Every sample or interlude that's used is something that directly relates to a song or is the basis of the song."

It was released on 9 June 2023 through Ninja Tune.

== Critical reception ==
Professional ratings
Aggregate scores
Source	Rating
Metacritic	76/100
Review scores
Source	Rating
AllMusic	3.5/5 stars
Exclaim!	7/10
MusicOMH	3.5/5 stars
Pitchfork	7.4/10
PopMatters	7/10

According to the review aggregator Metacritic, Guy received "generally favorable reviews" based on a weighted average score of 76 out of 100 from 7 critic scores.

Gabe Lunn of Exclaim! commented that "The record is an achievement of pop-house production, and Jayda's performance throughout is earnest and enthralling — It's a strong effort and vital evolution in her ever-shifting career." Paul Simpson of AllMusic stated, "While the songs often have cheerful and empowering choruses, the lyrics dig deeper into Jayda's father's stories and her reactions to them." Alex Brent of PopMatters called the album "an admirable and occasionally affecting project that balances personal vulnerabilities with uplifting and life-affirming music."

It was nominated for Best Dance Record at the 2024 Libera Awards.

=== Accolades ===
Year-end lists for Guy
Publication	List	Rank	Ref.
CBC Music	The 23 Best Canadian Albums of 2023	8	
Exclaim!	Exclaim!'s 50 Best Albums of 2023	46	
PopMatters	The 25 Best Electronic Albums of 2023	21	

== Track listing ==
Guy track listing
No.	Title	Writer(s)	Length
1.	"Intro"		0:47
2.	"Blue Lights"	Jayda Guy; Ed Thomas; Jack Peñate	3:41
3.	"Heads or Tails"	Guy; Sophie Frances Cooke; Peñate	3:39
4.	"Scars"	Guy; Thomas; Peñate	2:58
5.	"I Got Tired of Running"		0:34
6.	"Lonely Back in O"	Guy; Gabrielle Stok; Jack Lewn; Peñate	3:44
7.	"Your Thoughts"	Guy; Lisa-Kainde Diaz; Peñate	2:47
8.	"It Was Beautiful"		0:20
9.	"Meant to Be"	Guy; Thomas; Peñate	3:44
10.	"Circle Back Around"	Guy; Thomas; Peñate	3:15
11.	"When She Dance"	Guy; Cooke; Peñate	3:22
12.	"Sapphires of Gold"	Guy; Diaz; Peñate	3:20
13.	"15 Foot"	Guy; Diaz; Peñate; Alexandria Relkoff	4:06
Total length:			36:17

== Personnel ==
Credits adapted from liner notes.

- Jayda G – vocals, production
- Jack Peñate – production
- Marta Salogni – mixing
- Heba Kadry – mastering
- Flavio Mancini – design

== Charts ==
Chart performance for Guy
Chart (2023)	Peak position
UK Independent Album Breakers (OCC)	19
