= Second, Minute or Hour =

"Second Minute or Hour"

Single by Jack Peñate

from the album Matinée
- B-side: "Dub Be Good to Me (CD)"
- Released: 2006 (original release); 24 September 2007
- Genre: Indie rock
- Length: 2:59
- Label: XL
- Songwriter(s): Jack Peñate
- Producer(s): Jim Abbiss

Jack Peñate singles chronology
"Torn on the Platform" (2007)	"Second Minute or Hour" (2006)	"Tonight's Today" (2009)

"Second Minute or Hour" is the first single by singer-songwriter Jack Peñate, taken from his debut album Matinée. The single was re-released on 24 September 2007. It reached number 17 on the UK Singles Chart.

The single also features a cover of Beats International hit song "Dub Be Good to Me".

The music video shows the singer running along the raised section of the promenade on Brighton Beach.
