= Daffodils & Dirt =

Studio album by Sam Morton
- Released: 14 June 2024
- Recorded: January 2022 – January 2023
- Studio: The Copper House (London); The Old Rectory (Dorset)
- Length: 43:17
- Label: XL
- Producer: Richard Russell

Singles from Daffodils & Dirt
- 1. "Hunger Hill Road" / "Ghosts Are Dancing" Released: 2023; 2. "Cry Without End" Released: 2024

Daffodils & Dirt is the debut studio album by Sam Morton, an English music duo consisting of actress and singer Samantha Morton and record producer Richard Russell. It was released on 14 June 2024 through Russell's record label XL Recordings. It received universal acclaim from critics.

== Background ==
In 2020, Richard Russell heard Samantha Morton on BBC Radio 4's Desert Island Discs. Russell reached out to Morton, hoping to sample her spoken passage for his collaborative project Everything Is Recorded. They then began making music together and formed the duo Sam Morton.

In 2023, Sam Morton released two vinyl-only singles: "Hunger Hill Road / Ghosts Are Dancing" and "Supplication / Headbouncing". In 2024, the duo released "Cry Without End", their first track that has been made available digitally.

Daffodils & Dirt includes a rendition of Johnnie Ray's song "The Little White Cloud That Cried". UB40's Ali Campbell provided guest vocals on "Broxtowe Girl". The album also features contributions from Alabaster DePlume, Laura Groves, and Jack Peñate. The album's cover art is an archive photograph taken by Nick Waplington.

Samantha Morton directed the music videos for "Cry Without End" and "Let's Walk in the Night".

On 18 May 2024, Sam Morton performed the song "Let's Walk in the Night" on BBC's Later... with Jools Holland.

== Critical reception ==
Professional ratings
Aggregate scores
Source	Rating
Metacritic	81/100
Review scores
Source	Rating
Hot Press	9/10
The Line of Best Fit	8/10
MusicOMH	4/5 stars
The Observer	4/5 stars

According to the review aggregator Metacritic, Daffodils & Dirt received "universal acclaim" based on a weighted average score of 81 out of 100 from 5 critic scores.

Shaad D'Souza of The Observer commented that the album "captures the uncanny prickliness innate to all the best trip-hop while folding in elements of dream-pop and no-wave, resulting in an unnerving, intoxicating listen." He added, "It's eclectic and, by its skyward-looking spoken-word end, surprisingly invigorating." John Murphy of MusicOMH called it "one of the most startling albums of the year." He added, "Hopefully, Sam Morton won't just be a one-off collaboration, as chemistry like this is rare to find: a second instalment would be most welcome." Matt Young of The Line of Best Fit stated, "Daffodils & Dirt is an album that exudes an overwhelming sense of light, casting out the shade and destroying the darkness."

Daffodils & Dirt was included on the list of 2024's best record sleeves at the 20th Best Art Vinyl awards.

== Track listing ==
All tracks are written by Samantha Morton and Richard Russell, except "The Little White Cloud That Cried" by Johnnie Ray.

Daffodils & Dirt track listing
No.	Title	Length
1.	"Highwood House"	1:28
2.	"Hungerhill Road"	4:16
3.	"Purple Yellow"	4:23
4.	"The Little White Cloud That Cried"	3:42
5.	"Kaleidoscope"	4:10
6.	"Cry Without End"	3:44
7.	"Broxtowe Girl"	4:10
8.	"Let's Walk in the Night"	3:58
9.	"Greenstone"	3:23
10.	"Double Dip Neon"	4:28
11.	"The Shadow"	2:15
12.	"Loved by God"	3:16
Total length:		43:17

== Personnel ==
Credits adapted from liner notes.

- Samantha Morton – vocals, instrumentation
- Richard Russell – production, instrumentation, recording, engineering
- Ali Campbell – special guest vocals
- Laura Groves – additional vocals, instrumentation
- Alabaster DePlume – instrumentation
- Sonny Russell – instrumentation
- Tic – instrumentation
- Jabs – instrumentation
- Jack Peñate – instrumentation, additional engineering, mixing
- Joe Brown – instrumentation, additional engineering, mixing
- Andrea Cozzaglio – additional engineering, mixing
- Matt Colton – mastering
- Nick Waplington – front cover image

== Charts ==
Chart performance for Daffodils & Dirt
Chart (2024)	Peak position
UK Album Downloads (OCC)	61
UK Independent Albums (OCC)	17
