= Rose in the Dark =

Studio album by Cleo Sol
- Released: 27 March 2020
- Genre: Soul
- Length: 38:24
- Label: Forever Living Originals
- Producer: Inflo

Cleo Sol chronology
Winter Songs (2018)	Rose in the Dark (2020)	Mother (2021)

Rose in the Dark is the first full-length studio album by British soul singer Cleo Sol, released on March 27, 2020.

== Reception ==
Editors at AllMusic rated this album 4.5 out of 5 stars, with critic Andy Kellman writing that this music contrasts with the diversity of Sault, being made up of "dusty and intimate R&B with gospel roots, switched up on occasion with dub, bossa nova, and acoustic blues among other naturally integrated sounds", continuing that the instruments are played with "sensitivity and purpose". The site also chose this as the best of 2020, calling it "exceptional". The Arts Desk also included this among the best of 2020, with critic Joe Mugg giving it 5 out of 5 stars, characterizing the music as modern soul that has "the rich, string embellished psychedelic soul of Rotary Connection and Norman Whitfield era Temptations, though here there's more of a lovers rock pulse too" that has subtle power and "Sol’s voice is velvet throughout, but there’s absolute assurance that the hooks embedded and woven through the grooves are plenty to make it addictive". Both Clash Music (44th) and Complex UK (5th) included this on their list of the best albums of the year: in the former, editors praised the music's impact during the COVID-19 pandemic and in the latter, Joseph "JP" Patterson wrote that this release "leaves [Sol's] mark as one of British music’s brightest talents, an R&B icon-in-waiting".

== Track listing ==
All songs written by Dean Josiah Cover and Cleopatra Nikolic, except where noted.

1. "One Love" – 1:20
2. "Why Don't You" – 3:49
3. "Young Love" – 4:25
4. "Rewind" – 2:23
5. "Rose in the Dark" – 3:47
6. "When I'm in Your Arms" – 5:35
7. "Sideways" – 3:13
8. "Butterfly" (Cover, Nikolic, and Alistair O'Donnell) – 3:20
9. "Sure of Myself" (Cover, Nikolic, and O'Donnell) – 3:39
10. "I Love You" – 2:57
11. "Her Light" – 4:05

== Personnel ==
- Cleo Sol – vocals, instrumentation, liner notes
- Inflo – production

== See also ==
- List of 2020 albums
