= Inflo =

British record producer

- Also known as: Inflo 1st
- Born: Dean Josiah Cover; 4 June 1988 (age 38); London, England
- Genres: R&B; hip hop; pop
- Occupations: Record producer; songwriter; multi-instrumentalist; entrepreneur
- Instruments: Drums, bass, piano, synthesiser, guitar, vocals
- Years active: 2009–present
- Label: Forever Living Originals
- Member of: Sault
- Website: foreverlivingoriginals.com

Dean Josiah Cover (born 4 June 1988), professionally known as Inflo, is a British producer, songwriter, and multi-instrumentalist. He helms the R&B music collective project Sault, which foregrounds black-centric issues.

== Career ==
In 2014, British rock band the Kooks worked with Inflo on their fourth studio album Listen after frontman Luke Pritchard discovered him via SoundCloud. Pritchard described Inflo as a "young Quincy Jones" noting Inflo's bravery and conceptuality in his production. In 2016, Inflo worked with Max Jury, Tom Odell, and Michael Kiwanuka, working with the latter on his critically acclaimed sophomore album, Love & Hate, for which he won the Best Song Musically and Lyrically at the Ivor Novello Awards for co-writing "Black Man in a White World".

In 2020, Inflo was a songwriter and producer (along with Danger Mouse) on Michael Kiwanuka's third studio album Kiwanuka, which received the 2020 Mercury Prize while earning him a nomination (as a producer) for Best Rock Album at the 63rd Annual Grammy Awards. He also won the Best Album at the Ivor Novello Awards the same year for his work on the album Grey Area by Little Simz.

In 2021, Inflo produced Little Simz' Sometimes I Might Be Introvert and Cleo Sol's Mother, in addition to his work on Sault's fifth effort, Nine and contributing to three songs on Adele's fourth studio album 30, earning him a second Grammy nomination for Album of the Year (as a songwriter and producer). On 30 September 2021, Inflo was announced as the winner of the acclaimed MPG (Music Producers Guild) UK "Producer of the Year" award. On 8 February 2022, he was announced as the "Producer of the Year" at the 2022 Brit Awards, becoming the first Black person to receive this honour since the inception of the Brits in 1977.

== Legal issues ==
In January 2025, collaborator Little Simz sued Inflo for failing to repay a £1.7m loan. The loan was to be put towards recordings costs, as well as a one-off Sault event. In October 2025 Inflo filed a £2.8m counter claim for unpaid management fees and other losses against the U.K. rapper, while denying her allegations that he owes her £1.7m in loans.

== Personal life ==
Inflo is married to singer and bandmate Cleo Sol. They welcomed their first child in 2021.

== Discography ==
=== Singles ===
- "No Fear" (2018)

== Production discography ==
=== Albums ===
- Listen by The Kooks (2014)
- Love & Hate by Michael Kiwanuka (2016)
- Winter Songs by Cleo Sol (2018)
- For Ever by Jungle (2018)
- Grey Area by Little Simz (2019)
- Kiwanuka by Michael Kiwanuka (2019)
- 5 by Sault (2019)
- 7 by Sault (2019)
- Untitled (Black Is) by Sault (2020)
- Untitled (Rise) by Sault (2020)
- Rose in the Dark by Cleo Sol (2020)
- Nine by Sault (2021)
- Mother by Cleo Sol (2021)
- Sometimes I Might Be Introvert by Little Simz (2021)
- 30 by Adele (2021)
- Air by Sault (2022)
- 10 by Sault (2022)
- AIIR by Sault (2022)
- Earth by Sault (2022)
- Today & Tomorrow by Sault (2022)
- 11 by Sault (2022)
- Untitled (God) by Sault (2022)
- No Thank You by Little Simz (2022)
- Heaven by Cleo Sol (2023)
- Gold by Cleo Sol (2023)
- Acts of Faith by Sault (2024)
- Chromakopia (with Tyler Okonma) (2024)
- Small Changes by Michael Kiwanuka (2024)
- Exile by Chronixx (2025)

=== Tracks ===
Title	Year	Artist	Album
"Died in Your Eyes"	2009	Kristinia DeBarge	Exposed
"The World I Knew"	2011	Jordin Sparks	African Cats
"Numb"	2016	Max Jury	Max Jury
"Princess"	2016	Max Jury	Max Jury
"Ella's Moonshine"	2016	Max Jury	Max Jury
"Concrete"	2016	Tom Odell	Wrong Crowd
"Somehow"	2016	Tom Odell	Wrong Crowd
"Show Me the Sun"	2018	Belle and Sebastian	How to Solve Our Human Problems
"Poor Boy"	2018	Belle and Sebastian	How to Solve Our Human Problems
"Long Way Back"	2019	Kid Sister	Non-album single
"All Your Friends"	2019	The Snuts	Mixtape; W.L.
"Prayer"	2019	Jack Peñate	After You
"Murder"	2019	Jack Peñate	After You
"Juan Belmonte"	2019	The Snuts	W.L.
"Coffee & Cigarettes"	2020	The Snuts	Mixtape; W.L.
"Boardwalk"	2020	The Snuts	Mixtape; W.L.
"Microwave"	2021	The Snuts	W.L.
"Dry Your Tears"	2021	Jungle	Loving in Stereo
"Bonnie Hill"	2021	Jungle	Loving in Stereo
"Talk About It"	2021	Jungle	Loving in Stereo
"Woman like Me"	2021	Adele	30
"Hold On"	2021	Adele	30
"Love Is a Game"	2021	Adele	30
"Love on the Run"	2022	Broken Bells	Into the Blue
"The Darkest Part" (featuring Raekwon and Kid Sister)	2022	Danger Mouse and Black Thought	Cheat Codes
"Aquamarine" (featuring Michael Kiwanuka)	2022	Danger Mouse and Black Thought	Cheat Codes
