= Everything Is New =

Studio album by Jack Peñate
- Released: 22 June 2009
- Recorded: 2008–2009
- Genre: Indie rock
- Length: 33:43
- Label: XL
- Producer: Paul Epworth

Jack Peñate chronology
Matinée (2007)	Everything Is New (2009)	After You (2019)

Singles from Everything Is New
- 1. "Tonight's Today" Released: 30 March 2009; 2. "Be the One" Released: 15 June 2009; 3. "Pull My Heart Away" Released: 23 August 2009

Professional ratings
Review scores
Source	Rating
AllMusic	4/5 stars
The Daily Telegraph	4/5 stars
Drowned in Sound	7/10
The Guardian	4/5 stars
musicOMH	4/5 stars
NME	3.5/5 stars
The Observer	4/5 stars
Pitchfork	7.4/10
PopMatters	7/10
Rolling Stone	3/5 stars

Everything Is New is the second album from the British singer-songwriter Jack Peñate. It was released on 22 June 2009 on XL Recordings. It received much more favourable reviews than his debut Matinée.

The song "Every Glance" features backing vocals from Adele.

== Track listing ==
1. "Pull My Heart Away" – 4:11
2. "Be the One" – 4:12
3. "Everything Is New" – 4:05
4. "Tonight's Today" – 3:23
5. "So Near" – 3:37
6. "Every Glance" – 4:15
7. "Give Yourself Away" – 3:02
8. "Let's All Die" – 3:32
9. "Body Down" – 4:06

== Charts ==
Chart performance for Everything Is New
Chart (2009)	Peak position
Belgian Albums (Ultratop Flanders)	61
Scottish Albums (OCC)	45
UK Albums (OCC)	16
