= 11 (Sault album) =

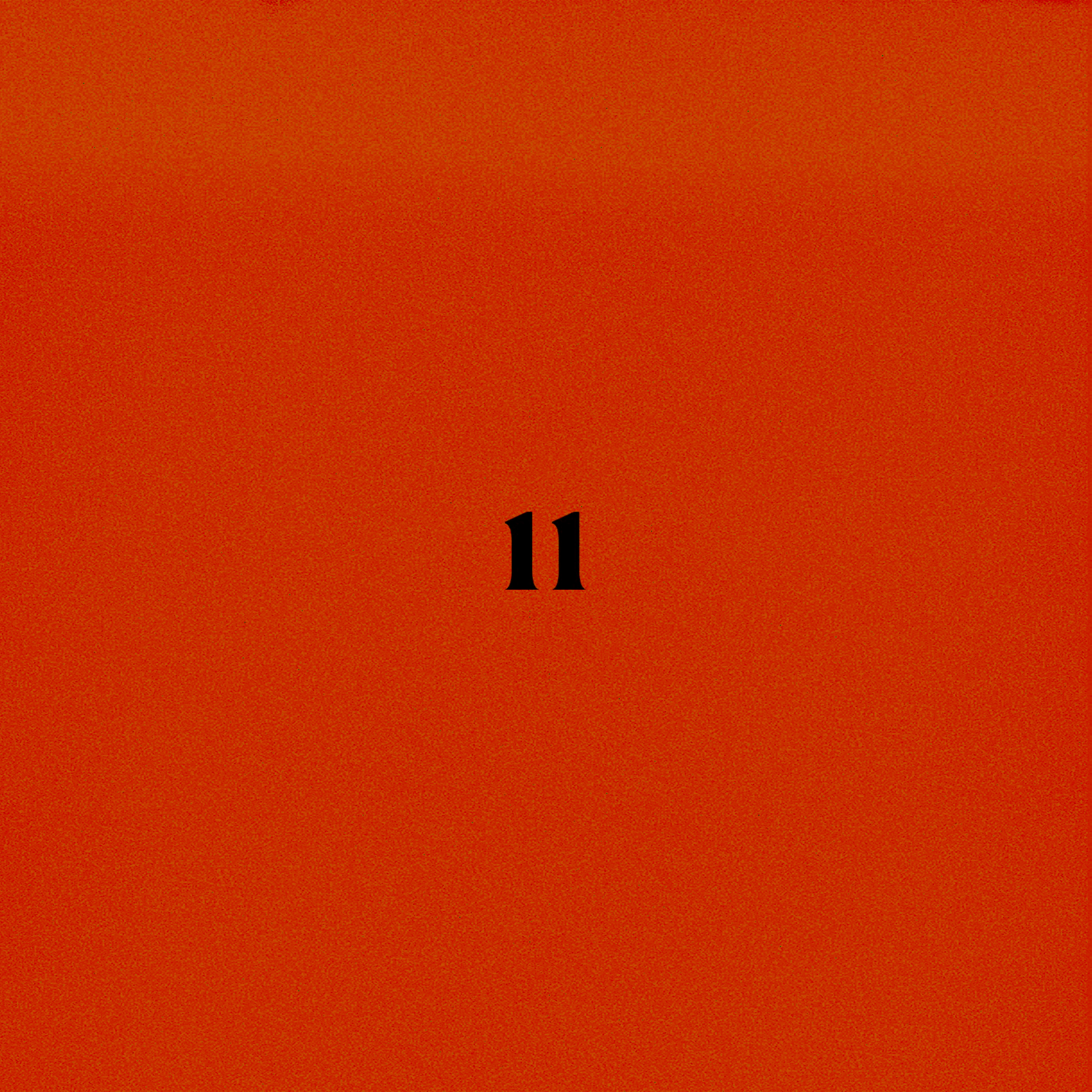

Studio album by Sault
- Released: 1 November 2022
- Genre: Funk, neo soul
- Length: 43:59
- Label: Forever Living Originals
- Producer: Inflo

Sault chronology
10 (2022)	11 (2022)	AIIR (2022)

11 is the seventh studio album from British funk band Sault, one of the five released for free via digital distribution on 1 November 2022 (along with Aiir, Earth, Today & Tomorrow, and Untitled (God)). The download was available for only five days via a password-encrypted link and made as an offering to God. It is the first album to feature a cover with a different color, being reddish orange, being generally the color black in previous covers. black. Four of the five (excluding Untitled (God)) were released on streaming music services on 12 November.

== Critical reception ==
Professional ratings
Review scores
Source	Rating
The Daily Telegraph	4/5 stars
Gigwise	7/10 stars
The Observer	5/5 stars
Uncut	9/10

Writing for The Daily Telegraph, Ali Shutler reviewed all five simultaneous releases by Sault and gave them a collective four out of five stars, noting that 11 feels like a direct sequel to Nine, "pulling from Afrobeats and blues". In an overview of the best music of the week on All Songs Considered, NPR considers the five releases "as sonically diverse as they are ambitious in their breadth and scale". Damien Morris of The Observer reviewed all five albums and scored them five stars, noting that "anyone can find their own five-star classic among these 56 songs" and summing up that "it's clear that these albums are an act of supreme generosity, not indulgent superfluity". Writing for Gigwise, Luke Winstanley called the collective releases "an absurd achievement" and scored this album seven out of 10, but noting that it "soon begins to sag".

11 received Best Album at the 2023 Ivor Novello Awards.

== Track listing ==
1. "Glory" – 5:37
2. "Fear No One" – 2:50
3. "Morning Sun" – 3:59
4. "Together" – 3:39
5. "Higher" – 3:41
6. "Jack's Gift" – 4:05
7. "Fight for Love" – 4:57
8. "Envious" – 2:33
9. "River" – 5:41
10. "In the Air" – 3:52
11. "The Circle" – 3:05

== Charts ==
11 debuted on the UK Digital Albums chart from the Official Charts Company at 23. The same week, Earth was 21, Untitled (God) showed up at 23, and Today & Tomorrow was 26.

Chart performance for 11
Chart	Peak	Duration
UK Album Downloads (OCC)	8	2 weeks
