= Matinée (album) =

Studio album by Jack Peñate
- Released: 8 October 2007
- Genre: Indie rock
- Length: 41:16
- Label: XL
- Producer: Jim Abbiss

Jack Peñate chronology
Matinée (2007)	Everything Is New (2009)

Professional ratings
Aggregate scores
Source	Rating
Metacritic	53/100
Review scores
Source	Rating
AllMusic	4/5 stars
Digital Spy	3/5 stars
Drowned in Sound	3/10
The List	4/5 stars
MusicOMH	3/5 stars
NME	5/10 stars
The Observer	3/5 stars
Pitchfork	4.9/10
PopMatters	4/10

Matinée is the debut album from British singer-songwriter Jack Peñate. It was released on 8 October 2007 on XL Recordings. The album reached number one on the UK Indie Albums chart, and number seven on the UK Albums Chart. It also reached number 74 on the Irish Albums Chart. The song "My Yvonne" features backing vocals by a young and then-unknown Adele.

== Critical reception ==
Matinée was met with "mixed or average" reviews from critics. At Metacritic, which assigns a weighted average rating out of 100 to reviews from mainstream publications, this release received an average score of 53 based on 15 reviews.

In a review for AllMusic, critic reviewer Sharon Mawer said: "Here was a chance to show that the music was worthy. With a singing style in the cockney accent of Lily Allen or Kate Nash, he differentiated himself from these singers by actually playing the guitar himself." At Spin, Jon Young wrote: "Occasionally, you wish Peñate would just calm down already — even the ballads feel a little rushed — but his ordinary bloke vocals and eager hooks never fail to please." Tom Ewing of Pitchfork explained: "everything on Matinée suggests he's a decent guy. But just as you're warming to him he comes out with another one-liner like "no one owns what nature's grown," and you're forced to remember that good men can also make bad records."

== Track listing ==
Matinée track listing
No.	Title	Length
1.	"Spit at Stars"	2:33
2.	"Got My Favourite..."	3:52
3.	"Have I Been a Fool?"	2:39
4.	"Torn on the Platform"	3:53
5.	"Learning Lines"	3:29
6.	"Run for Your Life"	3:35
7.	"We Will Be Here"	4:42
8.	"Made of Codes"	3:13
9.	"My Yvonne" (featuring Adele)	4:13
10.	"Second, Minute or Hour"	3:05
11.	"When We Die"	6:02
12.	"Learning Lines" (hidden track)

iTunes bonus tracks
No.	Title	Length
12.	"Didn't I"	3:54
13.	"Cold Thin Line" (live version)	2:58

== Charts ==
=== Weekly charts ===
Chart (2007)	Peak position
Irish Albums (IRMA)	74
Scottish Albums (OCC)	9
UK Albums (OCC)	7

=== Year-end charts ===
Chart (2007)	Position
UK Albums (OCC)	197
