= Heaven (Cleo Sol album) =

Studio album by Cleo Sol
- Released: 15 September 2023
- Genre: Soul
- Length: 30:04
- Label: Forever Living Originals

Cleo Sol chronology
Mother (2021)	Heaven (2023)	Gold (2023)

Heaven is the third full-length studio album by British soul singer Cleo Sol, released on 15 September 2023 through Forever Living Originals. The album was announced days before its release.

== Reception ==
Shahzaib Hussain of Clash Music scored Heaven an 8 out of 10, stating that this release "develops rather than radically departs from the muted palette of its predecessors, this time through the lens of an earned maturity" and features life lessons "predicated around zephyr-like immersion and mantra-like repetition". In The Fader, David Renshaw recommended this album's followup Gold prior to hearing it, based on the strength of this work and its "tender blend of neo-soul, 70s soul, and modern jazz". The Observer's Kitty Empire gave this release 4 out of 5 stars, calling the music "soulful succour" and "a short and delicate offering that crystallises [Cleo Sol]'s distinct appeal". Pitchfork's Vrinda Jagota rated Heaven 7.4 out of 10, writing that "there are many transcendent moments" and praised that "Sol is able to pivot between multiple emotional states—gratitude, calm, yearning—within the space of a single vocal run". Jem Aswad of Variety reviewed both Heaven and Gold, calling them both "serene R&B outings" and comparing them favorably to 1970s Stevie Wonder and Erykah Badu.

Editors at NPR Music included this among the 50 best albums of 2023. Editors at The Fader chose this as the 14th best album of the year. Editors at Clash Music listed this the 19th best albums of the year. Editors at AllMusic included this among their favorite R&B albums of 2023.

In Billboard, Carl Lamarre chose the best new hip hop and R&B tracks of the week, including "Miss Romantic", which he calls "an honest self-talk about overcoming a broken romance" on an album that includes "soul-stirring takes on love, motherhood and self-assurance [which] ring true". Writing for The Complex UK, James Keith called Sol's previous albums Rose in the Dark and Mother "titanic masterpieces" and considers this release their peer that continues the "stunning partnership" with Inflo; that publication later listed this as the fifth-best album of the year. The American Complex chose this as the 30th best album of 2023.

== Track listing ==
1. "Self" – 3:19
2. "Airplane" – 4:00
3. "Go Baby" – 3:56
4. "Heaven" – 2:42
5. "Old Friends" – 2:57
6. "Miss Romantic" – 3:21
7. "Golden Child (Jealous)" – 3:27
8. "Nothing on Me" – 2:44
9. "Love Will Lead You There" – 3:35

== Personnel ==
- Cleo Sol – vocals, instrumentation
- Inflo – production

== See also ==
- 2023 in British music
- 2023 in rhythm and blues music
- List of 2023 albums
