= Chronology (Chronixx album) =

Studio album by Chronixx
- Released: July 7, 2017
- Genre: Reggae
- Length: 66:43
- Label: Soul Circle Music; Virgin EMI

Chronixx chronology
| Dread & Terrible (2014) | Chronology (2017) | Exile (2025) |

Professional ratings
Aggregate scores
| Source | Rating |
|---|---|
| Metacritic | 83/100 |
Review scores
| Source | Rating |
| Exclaim! | 9/10 |
| The Guardian | 4/5 stars |
| Pitchfork | 7.6/10 |

Chronology is the debut studio album by Jamaican reggae musician Chronixx. It was released in July 2017 under Virgin EMI Records.

The album was up for nomination for Best Reggae Album at the 60th Annual Grammy Awards.

== Track listing ==
| No. | Title | Length |
|---|---|---|
| 1. | "Spanish Town Rockin'" | 3:23 |
| 2. | "Big Bad Sound" | 5:10 |
| 3. | "Skankin' Sweet" | 4:12 |
| 4. | "Ghetto Paradise" | 3:46 |
| 5. | "Country Boy" | 4:06 |
| 6. | "Smile Jamaica" | 3:33 |
| 7. | "I Can" | 4:28 |
| 8. | "Selassie Children" | 5:37 |
| 9. | "Black Is Beautiful" | 3:39 |
| 10. | "Majesty" | 3:04 |
| 11. | "Loneliness" | 3:51 |
| 12. | "Likes" | 4:18 |
| 13. | "Tell Me Now" | 4:42 |
| 14. | "Legend" | 3:57 |
| 15. | "Christina" | 5:05 |
| 16. | "I Know Love" | 3:52 |

== Charts ==
| Chart (2018) | Peak position |
|---|---|
| Swedish Albums (Sverigetopplistan) | 21 |
| US Reggae Albums (Billboard) | 1 |
