= Mother (Cleo Sol album) =

Studio album by Cleo Sol
- Released: 19 August 2021
- Genre: Soul; soul-jazz
- Length: 66:31
- Label: Forever Living Originals
- Producer: Inflo

Cleo Sol chronology
Rose in the Dark (2020)	Mother (2021)	Heaven (2023)

Mother is the second full-length studio album by British soul singer Cleo Sol, released in 2021. It has received positive reviews from critics.

== Reception ==
Editors at AllMusic rated this album 4.5 out of 5 stars, with critic Andy Kellman writing that "Mother is an engrossing double album... [and] more evidence of Cleo Sol and Inflo's high levels of productivity and quality control" that is "somehow both more concentrated and expansive" than Sol's 2020 album Rose in the Dark. The site also featured this as one of the best albums of 2021. Tom Doyle of Mojo gave Mother 4 out of 4 stars, calling it a "slow-grower, filled with multi-movement songs and repeated mantras... that further reveals its brilliance with every play" and compared it to 1970s-era Stevie Wonder. NPR Music ranked Mother the 26th-best album of the year, with Briana Younger writing that the songs have "a gentleness that seeps into the experience of listening to them". In The Observer, Kitty Empire scored Mother 3 out of 5 stars, writing that the music shows "wider encouragement, analyses of formative memories and entreaties to faith to one and all in her featherlight tones, as producer Inflo weaves orchestral soul-jazz around her" and also compares this album to Wonder. Vrinda Jagota of Pitchfork favorably reviewed the song "23", calling it "one of the album’s best and most nuanced songs", commenting on the lyrics' ability to explore themes of mothering and responsibility.

Mother nominated for the Best Album Ivor Novello Award in April 2022.

== Track listing ==
All songs written by Dean Josiah Cover and Cleopatra Nikolic, except where noted.

1. "Don't Let Me Fall" – 5:39
2. "Promises" – 4:24
3. "Heart Full of Love" – 5:05
4. "Build Me Up" – 8:02
5. "Sunshine" – 4:22
6. "We Need You" – 7:21
7. "Don't Let It Go to Your Head" – 4:19
8. "23" – 5:06
9. "Music" – 6:10
10. "One Day" – 8:25
11. "Know That You Are Loved" (Cover, Josh Lloyd-Watson, and Nikolic) – 3:22
12. "Spirit" – 4:16

== Personnel ==
- Cleo Sol – vocals, instrumentation
- Inflo – production

== See also ==
- 2021 in British music
- List of 2021 albums
