= Air (Sault album) =

Studio album by Sault
- Released: 13 April 2022
- Genres: Choral, contemporary classical, funk
- Length: 45:06
- Label: Forever Living Originals
- Producer: Inflo

Sault chronology
Nine (2021)	Air (2022)	Ten (2022)

Air is the sixth studio album by English contemporary R&B group Sault, released on 13 April 2022 to positive reception by critics.

== Critical reception ==
Professional ratings
Aggregate scores
Source	Rating
AnyDecentMusic?	7.2/10
Metacritic	77/100
Review scores
Source	Rating
AllMusic	4/5 stars
Clash	5/10
The Guardian	5/5 stars
Mojo	3/5 stars
Pitchfork	8.3/10
Uncut	7/10

According to the review aggregator Metacritic, Air received "generally favorable reviews" based on a weighted average score of 77 out of 100 from six critic scores. The editorial staff at AnyDecentMusic? scored characterized reviews as a 7.2 out of 10, with five reviews. The editors of AllMusic Guide gave Air four out of five stars, with reviewer Andy Kellman praising the group's transition to choral music, as well as the vocals on "Luos Higher". In The Guardian, Stevie Chick scored this release five out of five stars, calling this "boundary-breaking work for an entirely new and unexpected paradigm" after the group's funk and hip hop roots.

Shy Thompson of Pitchfork rated Air an 83 out of 100, with the site naming it the Best New Music of the week; Thompson's review calls Air "too manifold to be easily simplified" and noting that it is an important statement about love. The same publication posted a review of the 39 best albums of 2022 so far on 13 June and included Air.

For The Quietus, Nathan Evans called this album "compositions deserve Fantasia-style visuals", that still retain some of the group's R&B roots. Clash's Robin Murray dissented, with a five out of 10 review that considers this work weak compared the band's back catalogue, calling it "disappointing and listless", but "at times pretty, at others curiously appealing". Mojo's Tom Doyle rated Air three out of five stars, calling it "impressive in its execution", but noting that it "too frequently tends to the bombastic". In Uncut, John Lewis assessed this release a seven out of 10 for being "a rather audacious curveball" that is "a little stiff and metronomic in places".

== Track listing ==
1. "Reality" – 3:58
2. "Air" – 5:54
3. "Heart" – 3:52
4. "Solar" – 12:34
5. "Time Is Precious" – 7:03
6. "June 55" – 5:31
7. "Luos Higher" – 6:10

== Chart performance ==
Chart performance for Air
Chart	Peak	Duration
UK Album Downloads (Official Charts)	2	4 weeks
UK Independent Albums (Official Charts)	4	4 weeks
US Top Classical Albums (Billboard)	24	1 week
US Top Classical Crossover Albums (Billboard)	2	15 weeks
