= Nine (Sault album) =

Studio album by Sault
- Released: 25 June 2021
- Genre: R&B, neo soul
- Length: 34:06
- Label: Forever Living Originals
- Producer: Inflo

Sault chronology
Untitled (Rise) (2020)	Nine (2021)	Air (2021)

Nine is the fifth studio album by the British rhythm and blues collective Sault, released on 25 June 2021 on Forever Living Originals. Produced by Inflo, the album was only available on streaming services and as a digital download for 99 days, until 2 October 2021. The album received widespread critical acclaim, appearing on several end-of-year lists and received praise for its diversity of musical genres and styles as well as the lyrics' exploration of the urban black experience.

== Critical reception ==
Professional ratings
Aggregate scores
Source	Rating
AnyDecentMusic?	8.2/10
Metacritic	88/100
Review scores
Source	Rating
AllMusic	4/5 stars
The Arts Desk	5/5 stars
Exclaim!	8/10
Gigwise	9/10 stars
The Observer	5/5 stars
NME	4/5 stars
Pitchfork	7.8/10
Uncut	9/10

According to the review aggregator Metacritic, Nine received "universal acclaim" based on a weighted average score of 88 out of 100 from eight critic scores. The editorial staff of AnyDecentMusic? characterized eight reviews as an 8.2 out of 10. Kitty Empire of The Observer rated the album five out of five stars, calling Nine a "masterclass in anger and balm" and praising the spoken-word sections of the release. Jem Aswad of Variety praised the music for being "Black-centric and racially based, and forceful without being dogmatic or too in-your-face", with the lyrics exploring the experience of growing up as a minority in Britain. Stereogum listed Nine as the album of the week, with reviewer Ryan Leas also noted how the release discusses the band members' origins and using the music to dig into "complexities and layers of Black experience". After the album had been made unavailable for streaming, Will Dukes wrote an ode to Nine for Rolling Stone, calling the album release strategy "a fitting tribute to our ephemeral age" and praising how the group balances competing emotions with music that "dances with that specific existential despair, at once lighthearted and deathly serious". Tarisai Ngangura of Pitchfork compares the "repetitive, earwormy melodies" paired with "ominous undertones" to children's rhymes; the review assess all tracks on the album pointing out the heavy lyrical themes and the band's ability to laugh through them.

Barney Harsent of The Arts Desk wrote a five-star review, calling this one of the albums of the year, noting the varied genres of music and instrumentation as well as the album's ability to heal. Sofie Lindevall of Gigwise scored Nine a nine out of 10 stars and points out the diversity of genres and the powerful social messaging, including the spoken word piece by Michael Ofo. Another nine out of 10 came from Uncut's John Lewis who points out how London-centric the music is. Kyle Mullin of Exclaim! scored Nine an eight out of 10 for the "multitude of genres, styles and moods" present on the tracks that "span a spectrum between polish and grit". The editorial board of AllMusic gave this release four out of five stars and included it as the "Best of 2021", with reviewer Andy Kellman speculating that the tracks are outtakes from the band's previous albums, leading to the eclectic mix of styles that "play out like fragments of a concept album about grim street life caused by a lack of opportunities and endangered by a surplus of looming threats", but notes that even if they are outtakes, they are "no slapdash addendum" to the band's catalogue.

Nine on year-end lists
Publication	List	Rank
AllMusic Guide	Best of 2021	—
The Arts Desk	Albums of the Year: 2021	—
Consequence	The 50 Albums of 2021	27
The Guardian	The 50 Best Albums of 2021	6
NME	The 50 Albums of 2021	47
Uncut	The 50 Albums of 2021	5

Nine was nominated for Best Album at the 2022 Ivor Novello Awards.

== Track listing ==
Nine track listing
No.	Title	Length
1.	"Haha"	0:51
2.	"London Gangs"	3:26
3.	"Trap Life"	3:03
4.	"Fear"	3:30
5.	"Mike's Story"	0:56
6.	"Bitter Streets"	4:01
7.	"Alcohol"	4:03
8.	"You from London"	3:49
9.	"9"	5:14
10.	"Light's in Your Hands"	5:04
Total length:		34:06

== Chart performance ==
Chart performance for Nine
Chart	Peak	Duration
United Kingdom (Official Charts)	70	2 weeks

== Personnel ==
Sault

- Kadeem Clarke
- Dean Josiah "Inflo" Cover
- Cleopatra "Cleo Sol" Nikolic
- Melisa "Kid Sister" Young
- Jack Penate

Additional personnel

- Michael Ofo – vocals on "Mike's Story"
- Little Simz – vocals on "You from London"
