= Tonight's Today =

Single by Jack Peñate

from the album Everything Is New
- Released: 30 March 2009
- Length: 3:19
- Label: XL Recordings
- Songwriter(s): Jack Peñate

Jack Peñate singles chronology
"Have I Been a Fool" (2007)	"Tonight's Today" (2009)	"Be the One" (2009)

"Tonight's Today" is the first single by English singer-songwriter Jack Peñate from his second album Everything Is New.

Peñate told the NME that "Tonight's Today", "is very much about maybe having too much fun. Fun can be addictive, when things don't really seem to matter or be understood."

"Tonight's Today" peaked at number 23 on the UK Singles Chart, becoming Peñate's third top forty single in the UK.

== Charts ==
Chart (2009)	Peak position
UK Singles Chart (OCC)	23
UK Indie (OCC)	1
