= Torn on the Platform =

Single by Jack Peñate

from the album Matinée
- B-side: "On the Road" (CD); "Silence in Speech" (7")
- Released: 18 June 2007
- Genre: Indie rock
- Length: 3:57
- Label: XL
- Songwriter: Jack Peñate
- Producer: Tony Hoffer

Jack Peñate singles chronology
"Spit at Stars" (2007)	"Torn on the Platform" (2007)	"Second, Minute or Hour" (2007)

"Torn on the Platform" is the third single from the English singer-songwriter Jack Peñate. It was released on 18 June 2007. It reached #7 in the UK singles chart, staying in the top 10 for one week. The music video for "Torn on the Platform" shows a paper puppet show with Peñate's head on the puppet. The guitar work on the track has been cited for its similarities to the guitar on The Housemartins' track "Happy Hour".
