= Today & Tomorrow (Sault album) =

Studio album by Sault
- Released: 1 November 2022
- Genre: Funk, punk
- Length: 38:40
- Label: Forever Living Originals
- Producer: Inflo

Sault chronology
Earth (2022)	Today & Tomorrow (2022)	Untitled (God) (2022)

Today & Tomorrow is the ninth studio album from British funk band Sault, one of five released for free via digital distribution on 1 November 2022 (along with 11, Aiir, Earth, and Untitled (God)). The download was available for only five days via a password-encrypted link and made as an offering to God. Four of the five (excluding Untitled (God)) were released on streaming music services on 12 November.

== Critical reception ==
Professional ratings
Review scores
Source	Rating
The Daily Telegraph	4/5 stars
Gigwise	8/10 stars
The Observer	5/5 stars

Writing for The Daily Telegraph, Ali Shutler reviewed all five simultaneous releases by Sault and gave them a collective four out of five stars, noting that Today & Tomorrow "is an urgent, party-starting collection of rock, punk and ’70s funk". In an overview of the best music of the week on All Songs Considered, NPR considers the five releases "as sonically diverse as they are ambitious in their breadth and scale". Damien Morris of The Observer reviewed all five albums and scored them five stars, noting that "anyone can find their own five-star classic among these 56 songs" and summing up that "it’s clear that these albums are an act of supreme generosity, not indulgent superfluity". Writing for Gigwise, Luke Winstanley called the collective releases "an absurd achievement" and scored this album eight out of 10 for "straddling frenetic punk brilliance along with psychedelia tinged grooves and beautifully melancholic blues".

== Track listing ==
1. "In the Beginning" – 6:37
2. "Run" – 3:38
3. "Heal the World" – 2:17
4. "Lion" – 3:17
5. "The Jungle" – 5:14
6. "The Plan" – 2:19
7. "Money" – 2:33
8. "The Return" – 3:00
9. "The Greatest Smile" – 4:40
10. "Above the Sky" – 5:05

== Charts ==
Today & Tomorrow debuted on the UK Digital Albums chart from the Official Charts Company at 26. The same week, 11 was 8, Earth was 21, and Untitled (God) showed up at 23.

Chart performance for Today & Tomorrow
Chart	Peak	Duration
UK Album Downloads (OCC)	26	1 week
