= Gold (Cleo Sol album) =

Studio album by Cleo Sol
- Released: 29 September 2023
- Genre: Soul
- Length: 42:04
- Language: English
- Label: Forever Living Originals
- Producer: Inflo

Cleo Sol chronology
Heaven (2023)	Gold (2023)

Gold is the fourth full-length studio album by British soul singer Cleo Sol, released on 29 September 2023 through Forever Living Originals. The album was announced days before its release, just like its predecessor surprise album Heaven, released two weeks prior.

== Reception ==
Billboard's Kyle Denis chose "There Will Be No Crying" among the picks of the week, calling the song "a practice in affirmation, a paean for freedom and release in a world desperately in need of it". At Clash Music, Robin Murray gave this album a 9 out of 10, writing that everything Sol releases is excellent and that "while Heaven felt like a mood piece, Gold is more defined, the music more sketched out, and with more evident strengths". Okla Jones of Essence chose this as some of the best music of the week. In The Fader, David Renshaw recommended this album prior to hearing it, based on the strength of Sol's previous work and its "tender blend of neo-soul, 70s soul, and modern jazz". At HotNewHipHop, Gabriel Bras Nevares wrote that Gold is "another stellar effort" from Sol made of "tender, crisp, and obviously soulful genre fusions that establish her as a captivating voice". Jem Aswad of Variety reviewed both Heaven and Gold, calling them both "serene R&B outings" and comparing them favorably to 1970s Stevie Wonder and Erykah Badu. Vibe's Mya Abraham included Gold in the best music of the week, calling it "soul-stirring and ethereal" music that will help listeners "ascend" with this "soul-stirring LP".

The Economist chose this as one of the best albums of 2023, writing that both Gold and Heaven are excellent, but praising this release in particular for being more varied. The Complex UK chose this for the fourth best album of 2023. Staff at Billboard ranked this the eighth best R&B album of 2023.

== Track listing ==
1. "There Will Be No Crying" – 3:49
2. "Reason" – 4:00
3. "Things Will Get Better" – 3:29
4. "Only Love" – 3:24
5. "Please Don't End It All" – 4:25
6. "Lost Angel" – 5:54
7. "Desire" – 4:53
8. "In Your Own Home" – 4:08
9. "Life Will Be" – 3:18
10. "Gold" – 4:39

== Personnel ==
- Cleo Sol – vocals, instrumentation
- Inflo – production

== See also ==
- 2023 in British music
- 2023 in rhythm and blues music
- List of 2023 albums
