= Untitled (Rise) =

Studio album by Sault
- Released: 18 September 2020
- Genre: R&B
- Length: 50:32
- Label: Forever Living Originals
- Producer: Inflo

Sault chronology
Untitled (Black Is) (2020)	Untitled (Rise) (2020)	Nine (2021)

Untitled (Rise) is the fourth studio album from British R&B musical group Sault. The album has been met with positive critical reception.

== Critical reception ==
Professional ratings
Aggregate scores
Source	Rating
AnyDecentMusic?	8.7/10
Metacritic	93/100
Review scores
Source	Rating
AllMusic	5/5 stars
Beats Per Minute	81%
Clash	9/10
The Guardian	5/5 stars
Louder Than War	4.5/5 stars
Pitchfork	8.0/10

According to the review aggregator Metacritic, Untitled (Rise) received "universal acclaim" based on a weighted average score of 93 out of 100 from six critic scores. At AnyDecentMusic?, the editorial staff rate the album 8.7 out of 10, with six reviews. Alexis Petridis of The Guardian gave the album five out of five stars, saying that Sault had released the best album of the year again, following Untitled (Black Is) and points out the exceptional musicianship, writing that the album "hardly yields highlights because the quality never wavers: whoever’s involved, it feels like they’ve been galvanised to the top of their game". Jem Aswad of Variety accentuates how timely the work is, with the worldwide response to the George Floyd protests and struggles of black peoples in the United States and United Kingdom, writing, "Sault seduces listeners, drawing them in with beautiful sounds, and then hits them with uncompromisingly direct lyrics and messages that startle them into thinking about things they might not normally think about... [their music] is definitively 2020, by, for and about these times". In Clash, Robin Murray gave this album nine out of 10, also noting how the lyrics discuss contemporaneous issues, noting the diverse musical influences, from Brazilian rhythm to 1980s "boogie shimmer". Jeremy Monroe of Beats Per Minute scored this 81 out of 100, calling listening to Untitled (Rise) a "thrilling experience" with a spiritual dimension. Gordon Rutherford of Louder Than War gave this 4.5 out of five bombs, calling it a "another stab at winning the award for album of the year", following Untitled (Black Is). Reviewing the album for AllMusic, Andy Kellman felt that it was Sault's "most striking and affecting work yet."

For Pitchfork, Marc Hogan gave a positive review the track "Fearless", calling it a highlight of the album that "pairs impeccably stylish, laid-back R&B with a message that meets the current moment".

Accolades for Untitled (Rise)
Issuer	Listing	Rank
AllMusic	AllMusic Best of 2020	N/A
The Guardian	The 50 Best Albums of 2020	25
Mercury Prize	Album of the Year	Listed
Mojo	75 Best Albums of 2020	52
Rough Trade	Albums of the Year 2020	1
Stereogum	The 50 Best Albums of 2020	9

== Track listing ==
1. "Strong" (Dean Josiah Cover and Cleopatra Nikolic) – 6:18
2. "Fearless" (Cover and Nikolic) – 4:09
3. "Rise" (Cover and Melisa Young) – 1:01
4. "I Just Want to Dance" (Cover and Nikolic) – 4:21
5. "Street Fighter" (Cover and Nikolic) – 3:09
6. "Son Shine" (Kadeem Clarke, Cover, and Nikolic) – 3:16
7. "Rise Intently" (Cover) – 0:50
8. "The Beginning & The End" (Cover and Young) – 3:38
9. "Free" (Cover and Nikolic) – 5:05
10. "You Know It Ain't" (Cover and Young) – 3:26
11. "Uncomfortable" (Cover and Nikolic) – 3:16
12. "No Black Violins in London" (Cover and Young) – 1:28
13. "Scary Times" (Cover) – 3:39
14. "The Black & Gold" (Clarke and Cover) – 3:04
15. "Little Boy" (Cover and Nikolic) – 3:52

== Personnel ==
Sault

- Kadeem Clarke
- Dean Josiah "Inflo" Cover
- Cleopatra "Cleo Sol" Nikolic
- Melisa Young

== Chart performance ==
Chart performance for Untitled (Black Is)
Chart	Peak	Duration
United Kingdom (Official Charts: Album Downloads.	20	1 week
