= Untitled (God) =

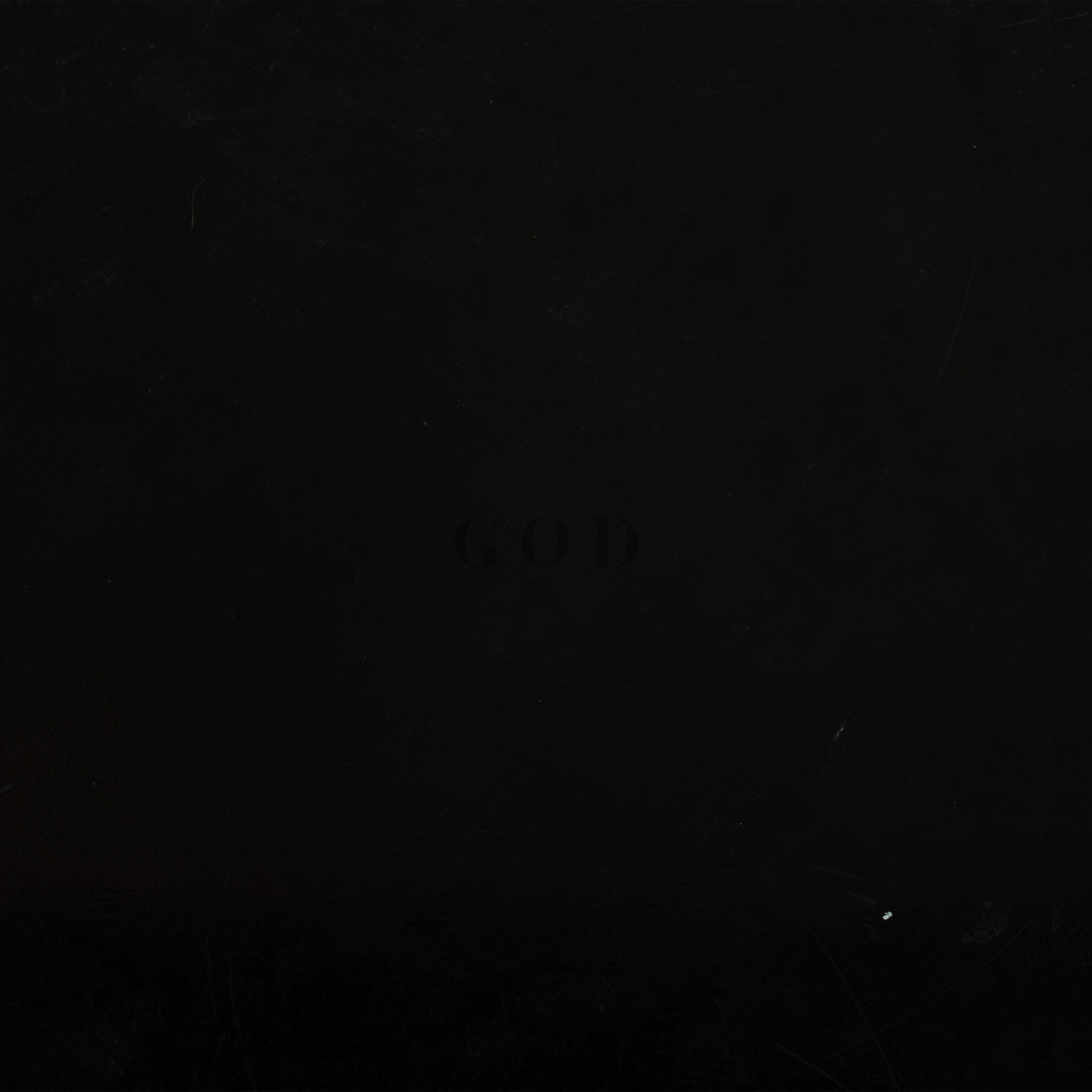

Studio album by Sault
- Released: 1 November 2022
- Genre: Funk; gospel; Christian music
- Length: 73:08
- Label: Forever Living Originals
- Producer: Inflo

Sault chronology
Today & Tomorrow (2022)	Untitled (God) (2022)	Acts of Faith (2024)

Untitled (God) is the tenth studio album from British funk band Sault, one of five released for free via digital distribution on 1 November 2022 (along with 11, Aiir, Earth, and Today & Tomorrow). The download was available for only five days via a password-encrypted link and made as an offering to God. Four of the five were released on streaming music services on 12 November, and Untitled (God) was released on streaming music several days later.

== Critical reception ==
Professional ratings
Review scores
Source	Rating
The Daily Telegraph	4/5 stars
Gigwise	7/10 stars
The Observer	5/5 stars

Writing for The Daily Telegraph, Ali Shutler reviewed all five simultaneous releases by Sault and gave them a collective four out of five stars, praising Untitled (God) as "the best of a brilliant batch, with the Little Simz-featuring Free an obvious highlight". In an overview of the best music of the week on All Songs Considered, NPR called the five releases "as sonically diverse as they are ambitious in their breadth and scale". Damien Morris of The Observer reviewed all five albums and scored them five stars, noting that "anyone can find their own five-star classic among these 56 songs" and summing up that "it’s clear that these albums are an act of supreme generosity, not indulgent superfluity". Writing for Gigwise, Luke Winstanley called the collective releases "an absurd achievement" and scored this album seven out of 10, saying that while it "feels somewhat bloated, lacking the consistency of the aforementioned records", "there are enough moments of genius to make it worth your time".

== Track listing ==
1. "I Am Free" – 2:04
2. "God Is Love" – 3:31
3. "Love Will Free Your Mind" – 4:39
4. "Guide My Steps" – 1:51
5. "I Surrender" – 4:22
6. "Champions" – 4:10
7. "Rafael's Prayer" – 0:54
8. "Spirit High" – 2:33
9. "Love Is All I Know" – 4:53
10. "Dear Lord" – 1:07
11. "Safe Within Your Hands" – 3:31
12. "Never Feel Fear" – 3:09
13. "We Are Gods" – 4:32
14. "Faith" – 4:02
15. "God Is on Your Side" – 3:57
16. "Luminous" – 2:10
17. "Free" – 4:32
18. "Colour Blind" – 2:35
19. "My Light" – 5:30
20. "God in Disguise" – 4:00
21. "Life We Rent But Love Is Rent Free" – 5:07

== Charts ==
Untitled (God) debuted on the UK Digital Albums chart from the Official Charts Company at 23. The same week, 11 showed up at eight, Earth was 21, and Today & Tomorrow was 26.

Chart performance for Untitled (God)
Chart	Peak	Duration
UK Album Downloads (Official Charts)	23	1 week
