= Jayda G =

Canadian music producer and DJ

- Born: Jayda Guy; Grand Forks, British Columbia, Canada
- Genres: Dance; electronic
- Occupations: DJ; music producer; recording artist; songwriter
- Years active: 2016–present
- Labels: !K7 Records, Ninja Tune
- Website: www.jaydag.com

Jayda Guy, known professionally as Jayda G, is a Canadian house music producer and DJ. She was nominated at the 63rd Annual Grammy Awards in the best electronic dance recording category for her song "Both of Us", and later remixed Dua Lipa's "Cool" for the album Club Future Nostalgia.

== Early life ==
Guy grew up in Grand Forks, British Columbia, a small community of about 4,000 people just north of the Canada-U.S. border. During her youth, she became interested in researching music through online services such as Napster, discovering the catalogues of Jimi Hendrix and eventually house music artists.

Guy's brother Sol was an influential player at former record label BMG Canada, where he helped Vancouver rap act Rascalz become popular in Canada.

== Education ==
Guy pursued an education in biology, working at a Vancouver aquarium, and later relocating to the city full time in 2013 to pursue a master's degree in Resource and Environmental Management, specializing in environmental toxicology.

While completing her master's degree, she pursued DJing at local Vancouver establishments as little more than a hobby, but she found with her connections to the local arts scene “everything kind of snowballed” and the DJ gigs started to become more frequent.

== Career ==
Guy pursued her DJ career more seriously with a move to Berlin in 2016. The same year, she would release her first solo project, titled Jaydaisms, on an independent label she created with Fett Burger.

After the release of her debut album Significant Changes in early 2019, she moved to London.

She released the EP Both of Us / Are You Down in July 2020. It was nominated for the Grammy Award for Best Dance Recording in November 2020.

Guy maintains connections to the science community, hosting the JMG Talks series in February 2020 while she was completing a residency at the London venue Phonox.

In 2023 through collaboration with CNN Films and Conservation International, Guy created a 60 minute documentary titled Blue Carbon which describes the importance of sea grasses and mangroves in coastal areas are critical to natural carbon capture, protecting wetlands and shorelines, animal habitats (particularly manatees and crocodiles) and human communities. Filming took place in Florida, Brazil, Viet Nam, Senegal, England and France.

== Discography ==
Albums

- Significant Changes (2019)
- DJ-Kicks (2021)
- Guy (2023)

EPs

- Both of Us / Are You Down (2020)
