= Sault (band) =

British R&B group

- Origin: England
- Genres: Neo soul; R&B; funk; neo-classical; reggae; gospel; progressive soul
- Years active: 2019–present
- Label: Forever Living Originals
- Members: Inflo; Cleo Sol
- Website: sault.global

Sault are a British music group that make a mixture of R&B, urban contemporary gospel, house and disco. The project is helmed by producer Inflo and lead vocalist and songwriter Cleo Sol. The group operates as a mostly anonymous collective, with many of its collaborators remaining a mystery. Known collaborators have included Kid Sister, Chronixx, Jack Peñate, Little Simz and Michael Kiwanuka. The group frequently puts Black-centric issues at the foreground.

During its first three years, Sault released five studio albums including 5 (2019), 7 (2019), Untitled (Black Is) (2020), Untitled (Rise) (2020), and Nine (2021). Throughout 2022, after releasing the orchestral instrumental album Air, the collective surprise-released five subsequent studio albums, simultaneously. The band has released thirteen studio albums to date, with their most recent, Chapter 1, released on January 9, 2026.

The collective have performed live on two occasions, with their debut performance at Drumsheds, London receiving widespread critical acclaim in December 2023. Their second performance – a five-hour headline set at All Points East festival in 2025 – received mixed reviews.

== History ==
=== 2019: 5 and 7 ===
On 15 February 2019, Sault released their debut track "We Are the Sun" via their record label Forever Living Originals; this was followed in March 2019 by "Don't Waste My Time".

In May 2019, Sault released their debut album, 5. In September 2019, Sault released their second album, 7.

=== 2020–2021: Untitled albums ===
Sault's albums in 2020, Untitled (Black Is), released in June, and Untitled (Rise), released in September, both received universal critical acclaim, including a nomination for the Mercury Prize in 2021 for the latter.

In June 2021, the band released their fifth studio album Nine. Between their 2019 debut and late 2023, they had never played a live show, given an interview or released a music video in support of their music and first teased a live performance in November 2023.

=== 2022–2024: Surprise albums, debut performance and cancelled tour ===
In April 2022, Sault released their sixth studio album Air. The Guardian described it as a "total volte-face" and Pitchfork described it as "a sharp pivot to lush contemporary classical". In October that same year, the collective released a reggae-influenced EP 10, consisting of one ten-minute-long song "Angel".

In November 2022, the collective surprise-released five albums simultaneously as a free download via WeTransfer, writing: "Here are 5 albums released as an offering to God. Available for free download for five days. The password to unlock all 5 albums is in the message. Love SAULT X." The five individual albums 11, AIIR, Earth, Today & Tomorrow, and Untitled (God), feature 56 tracks in total. Variety suggested this as "the largest amount of newly recorded music released by a relatively major artist at once." In May 2023, 11 won the Ivor Novello Award for "Best Album", with producer Inflo, vocalists Cleo Sol and Chronixx, and musician Jack Peñate as recipients of the award.

In November 2023, the group announced their first live performance, teasing that they would play an unreleased material. Later it was clarified that a series of seven live performances, each with music from a different album. On 14 December in London, the group performed songs from a forthcoming album Acts of Faith. Subsequent 2024 dates were announced in international locations: New York City (with music from 5), London (Nine), Los Angeles (Black Is), Canada (Untitled Rise), Germany (11), Paris (Air), and Africa (Earth). These performances, however, never took place.

In early 2024, a collaboration with André 3000 was announced. In July 2024, Acts of Faith was released online for free as a continuous single .WAV track, and on 25 December, the album was released on streaming platforms, followed by vinyl in April 2025.

=== 2025–present: Headlining All Points East and Chapter 1 ===
On August 15, 2025, Sault headlined All Points East festival at Victoria Park, London, marking their second ever live performance following their cancelled 2024 tour. The performance lasted five hours, with appearances from Cleo Sol, Chronixx and Yasiin Bey.

In January 2026, another unannounced album was released. Chapter 1, produced by Inflo, features Cleo Sol and Jack Peñate, and notably collaborations with Jimmy Jam and Terry Lewis. Upon the album's release, the collective noted that the album "moves with patience and belief. Rhythm, breath, and silence sit side by side, creating a space that is reflective yet charged. There is warmth and expectation. A sense that something is gathering."

== Members ==
Core members

- Inflo – piano, keyboards, acoustic guitar, electric guitar, bass, production, engineering
- Cleo Sol – lead vocals, lyrics

Known collaborators

- Chronixx
- Jack Peñate
- Kid Sister

Former collaborators

- Little Simz
- Michael Kiwanuka

== Discography ==
=== Studio albums ===
- 5 (2019)
- 7 (2019)
- Untitled (Black Is) (2020)^{[a]}
- Untitled (Rise) (2020)^{[b]}
- Nine (2021)^{[c]}
- Air (2022)^{[d]}
- 11 (2022)
- Earth (2022)
- Today & Tomorrow (2022)
- Untitled (God) (2022)
- Acts of Faith (2024)
- 10 (2025)
- Chapter 1 (2026)

=== Extended plays ===
- Angel (2022)^{[e]}
- Aiir (2022)

== Awards and nominations ==
Accolades for Sault
Organization	Year	Category	Nominated work	Result	Ref.
Brit Awards	2024	Best R&B Act	Sault	Nominated	
Brit Awards	2026	Best R&B Act	Sault	Won	
MOBO Awards	2023	Best R&B/Soul Act	Sault	Won	
Ivor Novello Awards	2022	Best Album	Nine	Nominated	
Ivor Novello Awards	2023	Best Album	11	Won	
Ivor Novello Awards	2023	Best Song, Musically and Lyrically	"Stronger"	Nominated	
Mercury Prize	2021	Album of the Year	Untitled (Rise)	Nominated	
MOBO Awards	2021	Best R&B/Soul Act	Sault	Nominated	

== Notes ==
- ^{^[a]} Untitled (Black Is) peaked on number 24 on UK Indie, and number 93 on Billboard charts. It did not enter the UK Albums Chart but peaked at number 13 on the UK Album Downloads Chart.
- ^{^[b]} Untitled (Rise) did not enter the UK Albums Chart but peaked at number 20 on the UK Album Downloads Chart. It peaked on number 48 on UK Indie.
- ^{^[c]} Nine peaked on number 99 UK Albums Chart, and number 12 on UK Indie.
- ^{^[d]} Air peaked on number 4 on UK Indie, and number 2 on US Classical Crossover Albums.
- ^{^[e]} X EP peaked on number 59 on UK Singles Downloads Chart.
