= All Songs Considered =

Music podcast

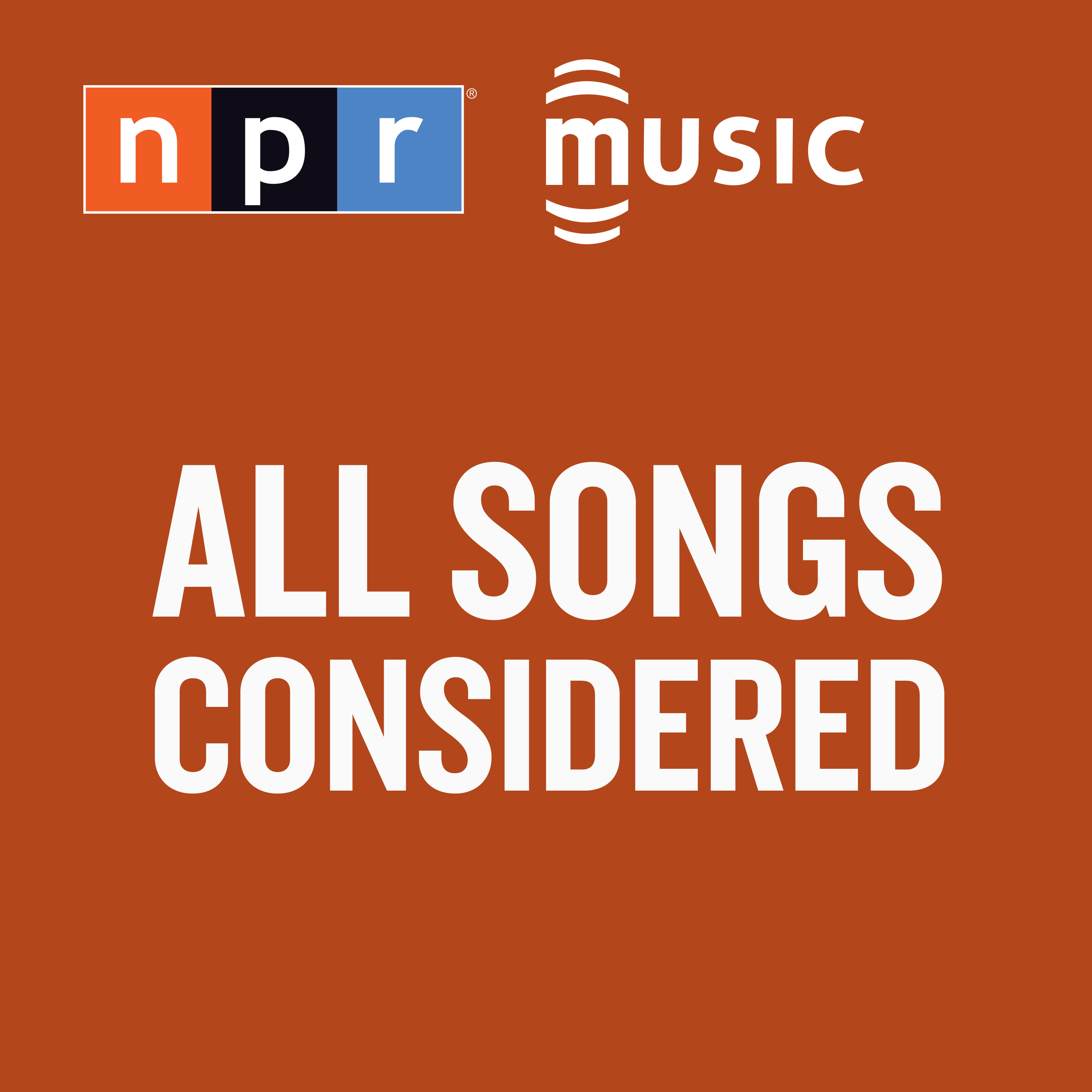
- Genre: Talk radio; music; music podcast
- Running time: 40 minutes
- Country of origin: United States
- Language: English
- Syndicates: NPR
- Hosted by: Robin Hilton
- Created by: Bob Boilen
- Original release: 2000 – present
- Audio format: Stereophonic
- Website: npr.org/sections/allsongs/
- Podcast: Podcast Feed

All Songs Considered is a weekly online podcast and radio program hosted by Robin Hilton. It was created in January 2000 by NPR's All Things Considered then-director Bob Boilen and produced by Robin Hilton beginning in 2001. At first, the show featured information and streaming audio full versions of the songs heard between stories on All Things Considered. The program has since turned into a source of discovery for new music of all genres. In August 2005, the program began podcasting for free. In 2005, it began webcasting and podcasting live concerts from Washington, D.C.'s 9:30 Club, including acts such as Animal Collective, The Decemberists, Neko Case, and Tom Waits.

Boilen and Hilton wrote a blog where they introduced music from unsigned and unknown bands and solicited ideas for shows from listeners. There was an online music channel, "All Songs 24/7", which used to stream music from the program's archive, however this was discontinued in March 2019.

In 2007, All Songs Considered became the cornerstone program of NPR Music, the music discovery web site from National Public Radio. Some NPR stations also directly broadcast the program on terrestrial radio.

All Songs Considered is also the spiritual and physical home of Tiny Desk Concerts, as the concert series is recorded live at the former office desk of All Songs Considered host Bob Boilen at NPR's headquarters in Washington D.C.

All Songs Considered was a nominee for the 2002 Webby Awards in the "Websites and Mobile Sites" category.

Hilton assumed regular hosting duties of the show after Boilen's retirement in October 2023.

== See also ==
- Music podcast
