= Cleo Sol =

English musical artist (born 1990)

- Born: Cleopatra Zvezdana Nikolic; 24 March 1990 (age 36); Ladbroke Grove, London, England
- Genres: British soul; alternative R&B
- Occupations: Singer; songwriter
- Years active: 2008–present
- Label: Forever Living Originals
- Member of: Sault
- Website: cleo-sol.com

Cleopatra Zvezdana Nikolic (born 24 March 1990), better known by her stage name Cleo Sol, is an English singer-songwriter. Working closely with her husband, the producer Dean Josiah Cover, she has released six solo studio albums beginning with the EP Winter Songs (2018), followed by full-lengths Rose in the Dark (2020), Mother (2021), Heaven (2023), Gold (2023), and her latest Gentlewoman (2026). She is also lead vocalist in the UK music collective, SAULT.

== Early life ==
Cleo Sol was born and raised in Ladbroke Grove to musicians who lived in Notting Hill. Her mother is Serbian-Spanish and her father is Jamaican.

== Music career ==
Cleo Sol made her debut in 2008 featuring on the single "Tears" by Tinie Tempah. In 2011 Cleo Sol signed to DaVinChe's record label Dirty Canvas and Island Records, releasing singles such as "High" and "Never the Right Time (Who Do You Love)". She took a musical hiatus from 2012 to 2017. She returned with the EP Winter Songs, released on 9 March 2018. In 2019, she was featured on the single "Selfish" by British rapper Little Simz, reconnecting in 2021 with the rapper for the song "Woman".

Cleo Sol released her debut studio album, Rose in the Dark, on 27 March 2020. It was included by Complex and Clash in their end-of-year lists. The next year, she released her second studio album, titled Mother, on 20 August 2021. Surprise albums Heaven and Gold followed in September 2023. She is a member of the UK based musical collective SAULT who have released eleven studio albums. The group rarely appears live or does interviews and Cleo Sol rarely performs live. Cleo Sol released her fifth album, Gentlewoman, in August 2026.

== Musical style ==
Cleo Sol has cited influences including Stevie Wonder, Erykah Badu and Jill Scott. She grew up listening to reggae, Motown, jazz, and Latin music.

== Personal life ==
Cleo Sol is married to the English record producer Inflo (Dean Josiah Cover); their child was born in 2021.

== Discography ==
=== Studio albums ===
List of studio albums, with selected details and chart positions
| Title | Details |
|---|---|
| Rose in the Dark | Released: 27 March 2020; Label: Forever Living Originals; Formats: CD, digital download, streaming, vinyl |
| Mother | Released: 20 August 2021; Label: Forever Living Originals; Formats: CD, digital download, streaming, vinyl |
| Heaven | Released: 15 September 2023; Label: Forever Living Originals; Formats: CD, digital download, streaming, vinyl |
| Gold | Released: 29 September 2023; Label: Forever Living Originals; Formats: CD, digital download, streaming, vinyl |
| Gentlewoman | Released: 20 August 2026; Label: Forever Living Originals; Formats: Digital download, streaming |

=== Extended plays ===
List of extended plays, with selected details
| Title | Details |
|---|---|
| Winter Songs | Released: 9 March 2018; Label: Forever Living Originals; Formats: Digital download, streaming |

=== Singles ===
Overview of Cleo Sol singles
| Title | Year | Album |
|---|---|---|
| "High" (featuring Gappy Ranks) | 2011 | Non-album singles |
| "Never the Right Time (Who Do You Love)" | 2012 | Non-album singles |
| "Code to Crack" (with Toddla T featuring Scrufizzer) | 2012 | Non-album singles |
| "Why Don't You" | 2017 | Winter Songs & Rose in the Dark |
| "Try and You Try" | 2017 | Winter Songs |
| "One" | 2019 | Non-album singles |
| "Sweet Blue" | 2019 | Non-album singles |
| "Butterfly" | 2020 | Rose in the Dark |
| "Shine" | 2020 | Non-album singles |
| "Fear When You Fly" | 2024 | Non-album singles |
| "Nothing Is Impossible with You" | 2026 | Non-album singles |

==== As featured artist ====
Singles featuring Cleo Sol
| Title | Year | Album |
|---|---|---|
| "Tears" (Tinie Tempah featuring Cleo Sol) | 2008 | Non-album single |
| "Selfish" (Little Simz featuring Cleo Sol) | 2019 | Grey Area |
| "Woman" (Little Simz featuring Cleo Sol) | 2021 | Sometimes I Might Be Introvert |

=== Guest appearances ===
Miscellaneous recordings with Cleo Sol
| Title | Year | Other artist(s) | Album |
|---|---|---|---|
| "Ladder" | 2012 | Angel, Mark Asari | 7 Minutes Before Time |
