= Little Simz discography =

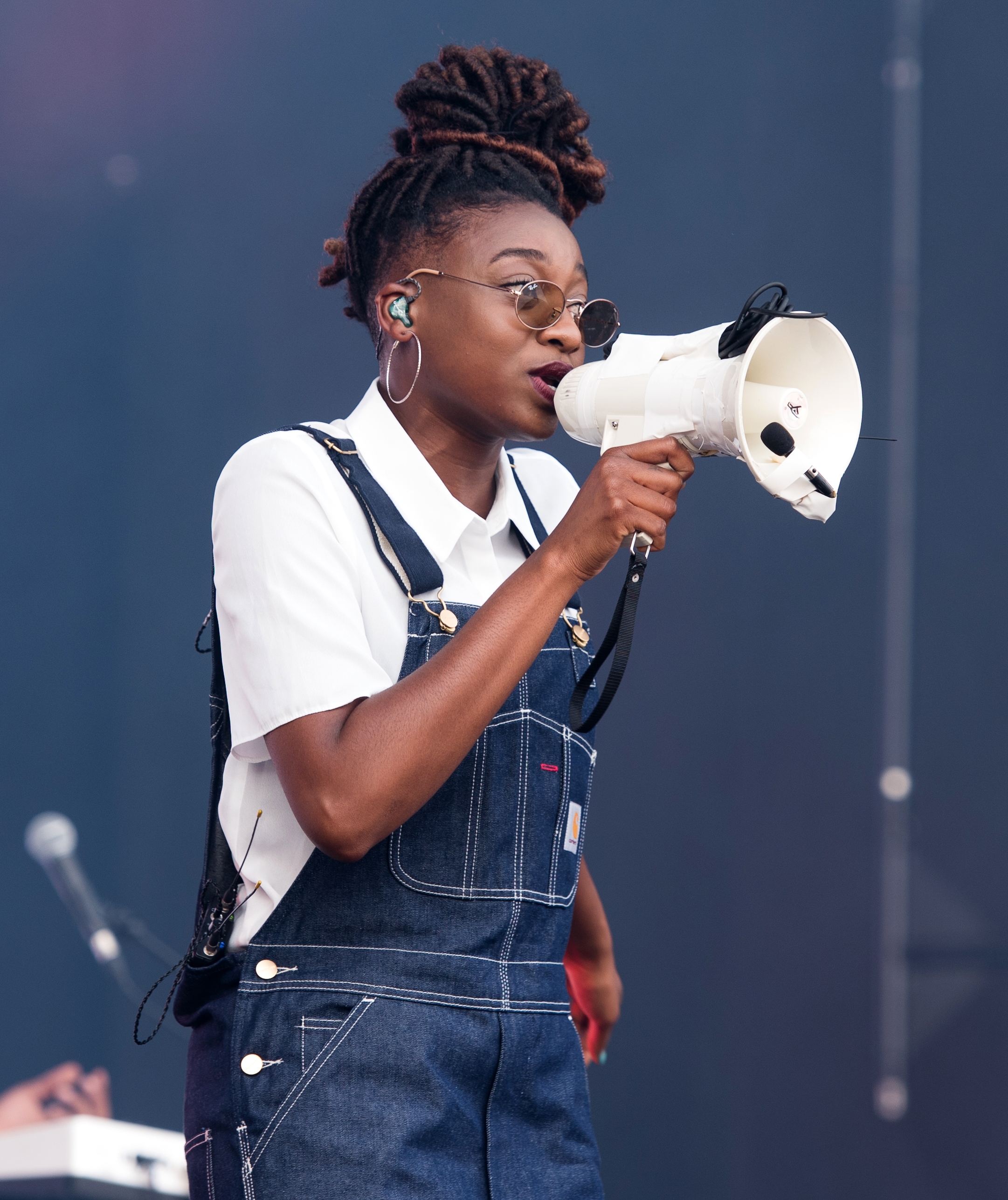
- Studio albums: 6
- EPs: 11
- Singles: 16
- Mixtapes: 4

The discography of British rapper, singer, and actress Little Simz consists of six studio albums, eleven extended plays, four mixtapes, and numerous singles.

Her debut studio album, A Curious Tale of Trials + Persons, was released in September 2015. This release was followed by Stillness in Wonderland in December 2016.

In March 2019, Little Simz released her third studio album, Grey Area, which earned widespread acclaim and was shortlisted for the Mercury Prize. Her fourth album, Sometimes I Might Be Introvert, released in September 2021, was hailed as her most ambitious work to date and won the 2022 Mercury Prize, along with the Brit Award for Best New Artist.

She released her fifth studio album, No Thank You, in December 2022 to further critical praise, solidifying her position as one of the UK's most respected and innovative hip hop artists.

Her sixth album Lotus was released on 6 June 2025.

== Albums ==
=== Studio albums ===
List of studio albums, with selected details and chart positions
Title	Details	Peak chart positions								Certifications
Title	Details	UK	UK R&B	UK Ind.	AUS	NZ	SCO	US Curr.	US Indie	Certifications
A Curious Tale of Trials + Persons	Released: 18 September 2015; Label: Age 101 Music; Formats: CD, LP, digital download, streaming	—	—	—	—	—	—	—	—	
Stillness in Wonderland	Released: 16 December 2016; Label: Age 101 Music; Formats: CD, LP, digital download, streaming	—	—	—	—	—	—	—	—	
Grey Area	Released: 1 March 2019; Label: Age 101 Music, AWAL; Formats: CD, LP, digital download, streaming	87	1	11	—	—	82	—	—	
Sometimes I Might Be Introvert	Released: 3 September 2021; Label: Age 101 Music, AWAL; Formats: CD, LP, digital download, streaming	4	1	1	40	—	3	22	45	BPI: Silver
No Thank You	Released: 12 December 2022; Label: Forever Living Originals, AWAL; Formats: CD, LP, digital download, streaming	40	1	4	—	40	9	61	—	
Lotus	Released: 6 June 2025; Label: AWAL; Formats: CD, LP, digital download, streaming	3	1	2	52	26	7	38	—	
"—" denotes a recording that did not chart or was not released in that territory.

=== Mixtapes ===
List of mixtapes with selected details
Title	Details
Stratosphere	Released: 15 October 2010; Label: Age 101 Music; Formats:
Stratosphere 2	Released: 14 September 2011; Label: Age 101 Music; Formats:
XY.Zed	Released: 23 February 2013; Label: Age 101 Music; Formats: Digital download
Blank Canvas	Released: 26 December 2013; Label: Age 101 Music; Formats: Digital download

== Extended plays ==
List of extended plays with selected details
Title	Details
E.D.G.E.	Released: 18 June 2014; Label: Age 101 Music; Formats: Digital download
Age 101: Drop 1	Released: 5 August 2014; Label: Age 101 Music; Formats: Digital download
Age 101: Drop 2	Released: 25 September 2014; Label: Age 101 Music; Formats: Digital download
Time Capsule	Released: 12 December 2014; Label: Age 101 Music; Formats: Digital download
Age 101: Drop 3|000	Released: 18 December 2014; Label: Age 101 Music; Formats: Digital download
The Theory Of... (with Space Age)	Released: 27 January 2015; Label: Age 101 Music; Formats: Digital download
Age 101: Drop 4	Released: 28 May 2015; Label: Age 101 Music; Formats: Digital download
Age 101: Drop X	Released: 22 December 2015; Label: Age 101 Music; Formats: Digital download
Project Unfollow	Released: 2018; Label: Age 101 Music; Formats: Vinyl
Drop 6	Released: 6 May 2020; Label: Age 101 Music; Formats: Vinyl, digital download, streaming
Drop 7	Released: 9 February 2024; Label: Forever Living, AWAL; Formats: Vinyl, digital download, streaming
Sugar Girl	Released: 8 May 2026

== Singles ==
=== As lead artist ===
Title	Year	Peak chart positions		Certifications	Album
Title	Year	BEL (FL) Tip	EST Air.	Certifications	Album
"Time Capsule" (with Jakwob featuring Caitlyn Scarlett)	2014	—	*		Time Capsule
"Dead Body, Pts. 2 & 3" (featuring Stormzy and Kano)	2015	—	*		Non-album single
"Backseat"	2017	—	*		Stillness in Wonderland (Deluxe Edition)
"Bombo Fabrika (Remix)" (with Gabriel Garzón-Montano)	2017	—	*		Non-album single
"Offence"	2018	—	*		Grey Area
"Boss"	2018	—	*		Grey Area
"101 FM"	2018	—	*		Grey Area
"Selfish" (featuring Cleo Sol)	2019	—	*		Grey Area
"Pink Youth" (with Yuna)	2019	—	*		Rouge
"Flowers (Live at Metropolis Studios, London, 2019)" (featuring Michael Kiwanuka)	2019	—	*		Non-album single
"Introvert"	2021	11	*		Sometimes I Might Be Introvert
"Woman" (featuring Cleo Sol)	2021	—	*	BPI: Silver	Sometimes I Might Be Introvert
"Rollin Stone"	2021	—	*		Sometimes I Might Be Introvert
"I Love You, I Hate You"	2021	—	*		Sometimes I Might Be Introvert
"Point and Kill" (featuring Obongjayar)	2021	—	*		Sometimes I Might Be Introvert
"Venom (Remix)" (from Venom: Let There Be Carnage)	2021	—	*		Non-album single
"Satellite Business 2.0" (with Sampha)	2024	—	—		Lahai (Deluxe)
"Hello, Hi"	2024	—	—		Non-album single
"Flood" (featuring Obongjayar and Moonchild Sanelly)	2025	—	—		Lotus
"Free"	2025	—	59		Lotus
"—" denotes a recording that did not chart or was not released in that territory. "*" denotes the chart did not exist at that time.

=== As featured artist ===
Title	Year	Peak chart positions										Certifications	Album
Title	Year	UK	CAN	FRA	GER	ITA	NLD	NZ Hot	SWI	US	US Dance	Certifications	Album
"Cuckoo" (Raleigh Ritchie featuring Little Simz)	2014	—	—	—	—	—	—	—	—	—	—		Non-album single
"Bad Dreams" (Joywave featuring Little Simz)	2015	—	—	—	—	—	—	—	—	—	—		How Do You Feel Now?
"The Nest" (Faze Miyake featuring Little Simz)	2015	—	—	—	—	—	—	—	—	—	—		Faze Miyake
"So Human" (Rosie Lowe featuring Little Simz)	2016	—	—	—	—	—	—	—	—	—	—		Control
"Back to My Love" (Becky Hill featuring Little Simz)	2016	—	—	—	—	—	—	—	—	—	—		Eko EP
"Far Cry" (Jack Garratt featuring Little Simz)	2016	—	—	—	—	—	—	—	—	—	—		Phase
"The Book" (OTG featuring Little Simz)	2017	—	—	—	—	—	—	—	—	—	—		Garden of Osiris – EP
"Garage Palace" (Gorillaz featuring Little Simz)	2017	—	—	—	—	—	—	—	—	—	37		Humanz
"Proud of Me" (Mahalia featuring Little Simz)	2018	—	—	—	—	—	—	—	—	—	—		Non-album single
"Favourites" (The S.L.P. featuring Little Simz)	2019	—	—	—	—	—	—	—	—	—	—		The S.L.P.
"You From London" (Sault featuring Little Simz)	2021	—	—	—	—	—	—	—	—	—	—		Nine
"Free" (Sault featuring Little Simz)	2022	—	—	—	—	—	—	—	—	—	—		Untitled (God)
"Domodachi" (RM featuring Little Simz)	2024	—	—	—	—	—	—	—	—	—	—		Right Place, Wrong Person
"We Pray" (Coldplay featuring Little Simz, Burna Boy, Elyanna, and Tini)	2024	20	92	126	40	71	30	7	22	87	—	BPI: Gold; ARIA: Gold; SNEP: Platinum	Moon Music
"—" denotes a recording that did not chart or was not released in that territory.

== Other charted songs ==
Title	Year	Peak chart positions	Album
Title	Year	JPN Hot Over.	Album
"Gorilla"	2023	5	No Thank You

== Guest appearances ==
Title	Year	Other artist(s)	Album
"Get This in Check"	2013	None	Youngers, Part 1
"The Drop"	2014	Nick Brewer	Four Miles Further – EP
"Catapult" with Kat Winter	2015	Lena Meyer-Landrut	Crystal Sky
"Table"	2016	Kehlani	Non-album songs
"Location (London Remix)"	2017	Khalid	Non-album songs
"Indie Girls"	2017	Jesse Boykins III, Kilo Kish	Bartholomew
"DBT Remix"	2018	Lioness, Lady Leshurr, Queenie, Shystie & Stush	Non-album song
"Rewind Time"	2018	VanJess	Silk Canvas
"King"	2018	Ghetts	Ghetto Gospel: The New Testament
"3WW (OTG Version)"	2018	alt-J	Reduxer
"Pink Youth"	2019	Yuna	Rouge
"Venom"	2019	None	Top Boy – A Selection of Music Inspired by the Series
