= Lotus (Little Simz album) =

Studio album by Little Simz
- Released: 6 June 2025
- Genre: Hip-hop
- Length: 49:55
- Label: AWAL
- Producer: Miles Clinton James

Little Simz chronology
| Drop 7 (2024) | Lotus (2025) | Sugar Girl (2026) |

Singles from Lotus
- 1. "Flood" Released: 26 February 2025; 2. "Free" Released: 27 March 2025; 3. "Young" Released: 14 May 2025

Lotus is the sixth studio album by English rapper Little Simz. It was released on 6 June 2025 through AWAL and features guest appearances from Obongjayar, Moonchild Sanelly, Lydia Kitto, Moses Sumney, Miraa May, Yukimi Nagano, Wretch 32, Cashh, Michael Kiwanuka, Yussef Dayes, and Sampha. Lotus is a hip-hop album containing elements of jazz, punk and funk.

== Background ==
Following the release of her fifth studio album, No Thank You, in late 2022, the rapper remained prolific by releasing her first EP, Drop 7 (2024), the stand-alone single "Hello, Hi" in December 2024 and collaborating with several artists, including Coldplay, Sampha and Wretch 32. On 26 February 2025, she announced her upcoming sixth studio album.

Lotus marks the rapper's departure from working with longtime collaborator Inflo who produced and co-wrote her last three albums (Grey Area, Sometimes I Might Be Introvert and No Thank You), as well as his wife, singer Cleo Sol, who did vocals on these albums. While Little Simz and Inflo had already started the process of recording a new album, they got into a financial conflict, in which she sued him for a total of £1.7 million of loans he allegedly owed her. She scrapped the new albums she had been working on with Inflo and started collaborating with Miles Clinton James (known for producing Kokoroko) on Lotus. Although Inflo is never explicitly mentioned on the album, his conflict with the rapper appears to have had a great influence on the album's lyrics and atmosphere. As Guardian journalist Lanre Bakare puts it: “Lotus feels like a breakup record of a sort, not romantic but still deeply personal, as the Simz/Inflo partnership is pulled apart and dissected.”

The album is set to reflect the rapper's "evolving artistry" and showcase "life's intricate phases". The lotus as a metaphor symbolises "transformation" which serves as a recurring theme throughout the album as well as its "overarching narrative". In an interview with Jack Saunders of BBC Radio 1, the rapper explained her fascination with lotuses as they are one of the only plants to bloom in muddy waters. She realised that this could be a metaphor for "anything" to become something "extraordinary" no matter the conditions. Talking about the music specifically, she once again wrote from an "introspective place" and experimented with "new sounds, pushing [her] pen, nice collaborations".

On 1 April 2025, she announced the album's release, originally scheduled to for 9 May 2025, would be postponed. She explained she had to delay it due to a conflict with a film shooting.

== Singles ==
The lead single "Flood" with long-time collaborators Obongjayar and Moonchild Sanelly was released 26 February 2025. "Flood" arrived alongside a black-and-white music video directed by Salomon Lighhelm.

The second single, "Free", was released on 27 March 2025. The third single, "Young", was released on 14 May.

== Critical reception ==
Professional ratings
Aggregate scores
| Source | Rating |
|---|---|
| AnyDecentMusic? | 8.6/10 |
| Metacritic | 86/100 |
Review scores
| Source | Rating |
| AllMusic | 4/5 stars |
| Clash | 9/10 |
| DIY | 5/5 stars |
| The Independent | 5/5 stars |
| The Line of Best Fit | 9/10 |
| MusicOMH | 5/5 stars |
| NME | 4/5 stars |
| Pitchfork | 7.4/10 |
| Rolling Stone | 4/5 stars |
| The Skinny | 4/5 stars |

Lotus received widespread acclaim from music critics upon release. At Metacritic, which assigns a normalized rating out of 100 to reviews from mainstream publications, the album received an average score of 86, based on 14 reviews, indicating "universal acclaim". The review aggregator site AnyDecentMusic? compiled 15 reviews and gave the album an average of 8.6 out of 10, based on their assessment of the critical consensus.

Kyann-Sian Williams of NME wrote, "Lotus isn't always an easy listen, and sometimes the truths in its bars feel more like diary entries than rap lyrics, but maybe that's its purpose. Across 13 tracks, Simz sifts through grief, pressure, burnout and spiritual reckoning with a vulnerability that is admirable, making it among her most important works emotionally rather than sonically. Here, Simz is stripped to the root, healing in real time. Raw, flawed and deeply human – this is what blooming really sounds like." The Telegraph's Neil McCormick gave the album four stars rating out of five and wrote, "Lotus is an absorbing and powerfully honest album. But whilst the title flower symbolises rebirth and enlightenment in many cultures, here it seems more suggestive of something beautiful blooming in a very dark place indeed."

== Track listing ==
Lotus track listing
| No. | Title | Writer(s) | Length |
|---|---|---|---|
| 1. | "Thief" | Simbiatu Ajikawo; Alexander Bonfanti; Miles Clinton James | 4:00 |
| 2. | "Flood" (featuring Obongjayar and Moonchild Sanelly) | Ajikawo; James; Dacoury Natche; Sanelisiwe Sanelly; Jonah Stevens; Steven Umoh | 2:47 |
| 3. | "Young" | Ajikawo; James | 2:50 |
| 4. | "Only" (featuring Lydia Kitto) | Ajikawo; James; Lydia Kitto; Jermaine Scott | 3:35 |
| 5. | "Free" | Ajikawo; Josh Arce; Bonfanti; James | 3:35 |
| 6. | "Peace" (featuring Moses Sumney and Miraa May) | Ajikawo; James; Miraa May; Natche; Moses Sumney; Stevens | 4:27 |
| 7. | "Hollow" | Ajikawo; James | 2:54 |
| 8. | "Lion" (featuring Obongjayar) | Ajikawo; James; Umoh; Malik Venner | 2:57 |
| 9. | "Enough" (featuring Yukimi Nagano) | Ajikawo; James; Yukimi Nagano | 3:02 |
| 10. | "Blood" (featuring Wretch 32 and Cashh) | Ajikawo; James; Natche; Cashief Nichols; Scott; Stevens | 4:28 |
| 11. | "Lotus" (featuring Michael Kiwanuka and Yussef Dayes) | Ajikawo; Yussef Dayes; James; Hannah Khemoh; Michael Kiwanuka | 6:35 |
| 12. | "Lonely" | Ajikawo; James | 4:25 |
| 13. | "Blue" (featuring Sampha) | Ajikawo; James; Sampha Sisay | 4:13 |
| Total length: | | | 49:55 |

== Personnel ==
Credits adapted from Tidal.

=== Musicians ===
- Little Simz – lead vocals (all tracks), piano (track 12)
- Miles Clinton James – guitar (tracks 1, 6, 12, 13), drums (3–5, 8, 10, 13), background vocals (3, 5, 7, 8, 11), synthesizer (7), bass guitar (9, 11)
- Rosie Danvers – music arrangement (tracks 1, 4, 5, 7, 11, 12)
- Wired Strings – strings (tracks 1, 4, 5, 7, 11, 12)
- Nathan Allen – drums (tracks 1, 12)
- Alex Nunez – drums (track 3)
- Lydia Kitto – lead vocals (track 4)
- Alexander Bonfanti – bass guitar (tracks 5, 12), background vocals (5)
- Miraa May – lead vocals (track 6)
- Moses Sumney – lead vocals (track 6)
- Alfa Sackey – background vocals, percussion (track 8)
- Venna – background vocals, saxophone (track 8)
- Steven Umoh – lead vocals (track 8)
- Yukimi Nagano – lead vocals, synthesizer (track 9)
- Morgan Simpson – drums (track 9)
- Cashh – lead vocals (track 10)
- Wretch 32 – lead vocals (track 10)
- Michael Kiwanuka – lead vocals, guitar (track 11)
- Yussef Dayes – drums (track 11)
- Sampha Sisay – background vocals (track 12), lead vocals (13)
- Kadeem Clarke – piano (tracks 12, 13)

=== Technical ===
- Miles Clinton James – production, engineering
- Dahi – additional production (tracks 2, 6, 10)
- Jonah Stevens – additional production (tracks 2, 6, 10)
- Mike Bozzi – mastering
- Ben Baptie – mixing (all tracks), vocal engineering (tracks 1, 2, 4–13)
- Hans Christoph Skirl – engineering (tracks 1, 2, 11)
- Matthew Jagger – engineering (track 9)
- Erik Hanson – co-mixing
- George Chung – vocal engineering (tracks 2, 12, 13), engineering assistance (1, 3–9)
- Josh Arce – engineering assistance (tracks 6, 11)

== Charts ==
Chart performance for Lotus
| Chart (2025) | Peak position |
|---|---|
| Australian Albums (ARIA) | 52 |
| Australian Hip Hop/R&B Albums (ARIA) | 8 |
| Austrian Albums (Ö3 Austria) | 14 |
| Belgian Albums (Ultratop Flanders) | 12 |
| Belgian Albums (Ultratop Wallonia) | 39 |
| Dutch Albums (Album Top 100) | 19 |
| German Albums (Offizielle Top 100) | 8 |
| Irish Albums (IRMA) | 85 |
| Japanese Dance & Soul Albums (Oricon) | 2 |
| Japanese International Albums (Oricon) | 16 |
| New Zealand Albums (RMNZ) | 26 |
| Portuguese Albums (AFP) | 103 |
| Scottish Albums (Official Charts) | 7 |
| Swiss Albums (Schweizer Hitparade) | 13 |
| UK Albums (Official Charts) | 3 |
| UK Independent Albums (Official Charts) | 2 |
| UK R&B Albums (Official Charts) | 1 |
| US Top Current Album Sales (Billboard) | 38 |

== See also ==
- List of 2025 albums
- List of UK R&B Albums Chart number ones of 2025
- List of UK top-ten albums in 2025
