= Jords =

British singer and rapper (born 1994)

- Born: 6 June 1994 (age 31); Croydon, United Kingdom
- Genres: Drill; garage; grime; house; R&B
- Occupations: Rapper; singer; songwriter
- Labels: Motown; Universal

Jordan Edwards-Wilks (born 6 June 1994), better known as Jords, is a British singer and rapper from Croydon, South London. His music style blends several genres, including grime, jazz, R&B, garage, house, and drill. Raised in a musical family, Jords grew up during the advent of grime music. He created and released music as a child, with his first tracks inspired by the local South London artists Krept and Konan. Jords began to release music on YouTube and released his debut mixtape, Means to an Ends, in 2016.

Jords signed with Universal Music in 2020. He released his debut album, Almost an Adult, in 2021, exploring themes of love and loss. Following the murder of George Floyd, he released the track "Black & Ready", gaining recognition and support from Ebro Darden and BBC Radio 1Xtra. In 2022, BBC Radio 1Xtra included Jords on their Hot For 2022 list. He signed to Motown in 2023, becoming the first British rap act to sign to the label. He released his second album, Dirt in the Diamond in the same year.

Outside of music, Jords co-hosts the podcast Almost a Conversation and established the Pickni Uniforms charity with his friend Jamahl Rowl. He served as the executive producer of the West End play PlayFight, which discussed racism's impact on black males in education.

== Early life and education ==
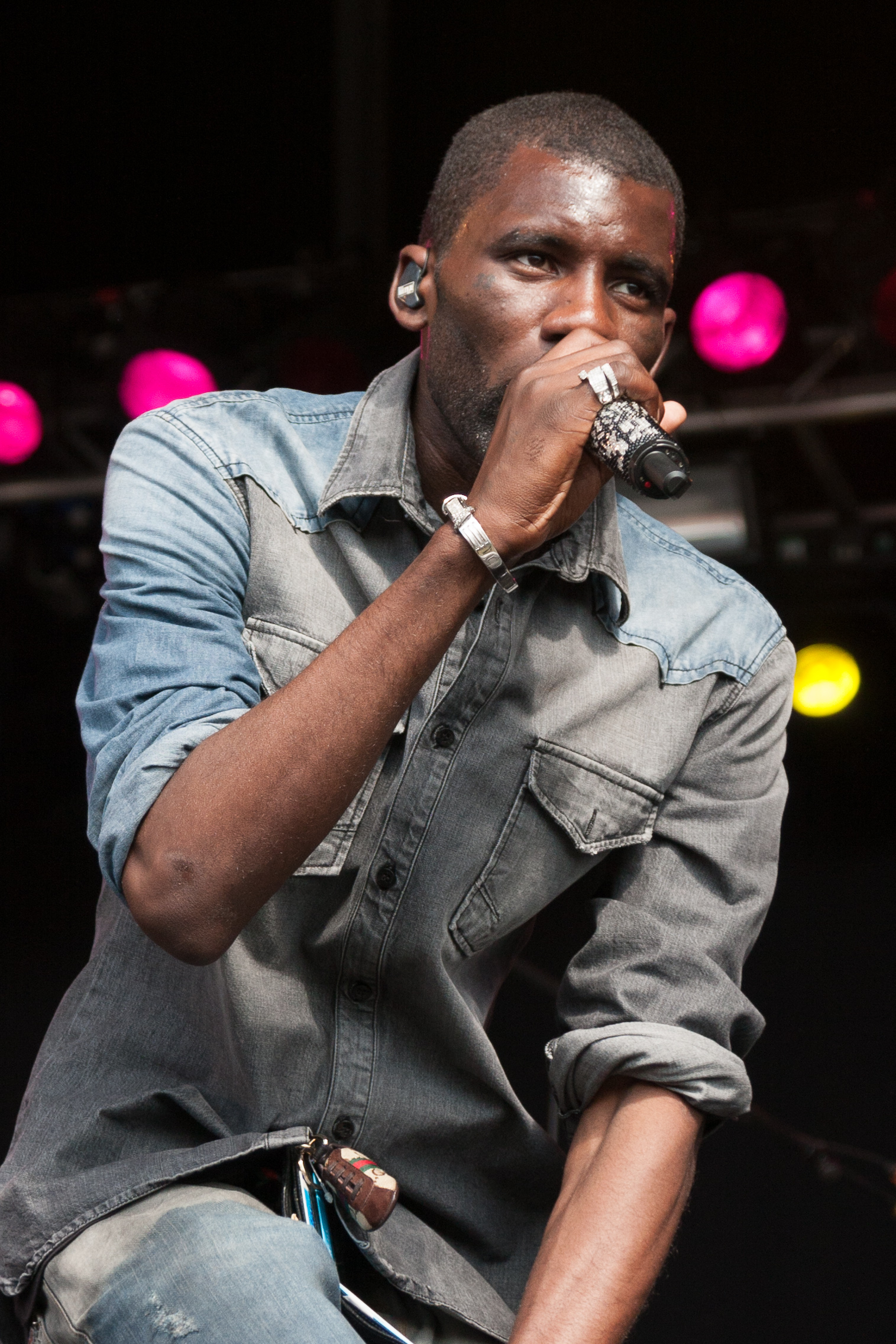
Jords listened to Wretch 32 (pictured) as a youth. They later collaborated on Jords' song "iPray".

Jordan Edwards-Wilks was born on 6 June 1994 in Croydon, South London, to Jamaican parents. He grew up in a musical family: his uncle is the Grammy-winning songwriter Gordon Chambers and his father is a member of The Jazz Defektors who performed with Sade and Paul Weller. His father never told him about his musical background, with Jords only finding out after his father was recognised by strangers in a Manchester Asda store. During his youth, Jords' mother acquainted him with the R&B and reggae artists like Brownstone, Buju Banton and Kelly Price. Jords' childhood coincided with the birth of grime music; he often listened to music by Chip, Wretch 32, Ghetts and Scorcher. He was interested in creating music during this time; his elder brother bought him his first microphone from Argos for £1 when he was 13. Aged 16, Jords began to think about a music career more seriously. His first tracks produced were inspired by the South London duo Krept and Konan and spread by Jords to locals under the pseudonym "Vicious Kid".

Jords dropped out of university twice: he studied for a year at the London School of Business and Finance, achieving a Higher National Certificate. He left, moving to attend the British Institute of Modern Music, which he left after a half-year.

== Career ==
=== Music ===
Jords' music draws from his experiences of growing up as a black man in London. Some of his songs discuss injustices that affect communities close to him, like those he sees as perpetuated by the criminal justice system, the government and the police. His music merges several genres, including grime, jazz, R&B, garage, house and drill.

The emergence of YouTube allowed Jords to publish his music on a larger scale, gaining support from channels like J Star Entertainment. Jords released his debut project in 2016 when he independently released the mixtape Means To An Ends. In this early project, Jords' style was described as seemingly being built off spoken word. After the mixtape's release, Jords signed an artist development deal with Iluvlive, a non-profit media company supported by Arts Council England. Jords' 2019 single "Glide" was successful on Spotify, achieving over seven million streams. The single features a sample of Anthony Hamilton's "Better Days".

After the release of Means To An Ends, Jords signed to Universal Music in 2020. Touted as "an extended coming-of-age tale", his first album, Almost An Adult, was released in May after several teasers. The album is influenced by love and loss, specifically, the emotions Jords felt after losing his grandparents during production. In a piece for The Guardian, Shannon Mahanty described Almost an Adult as "skat[ing] through genres with slick confidence and impressive dexterity", likening the opening track's style to a fellow Croydon rapper, Stormzy. Other tracks on the album were of a more gentle, jazz-inspired style similar to the music of Dev Hynes. A prominent sample of Swing My Way by K. P. & Envyi is featured on the track "Swing"; other tracks feature resamples of Jords' earlier work. To accompany the album's release, a short film lasting eight minutes was produced by Jords in collaboration with the filmmakers Curtis Essell and Christina Nwabugo. The film looks into Jords' family background and includes scenes of him with his extended family in Jamaica.

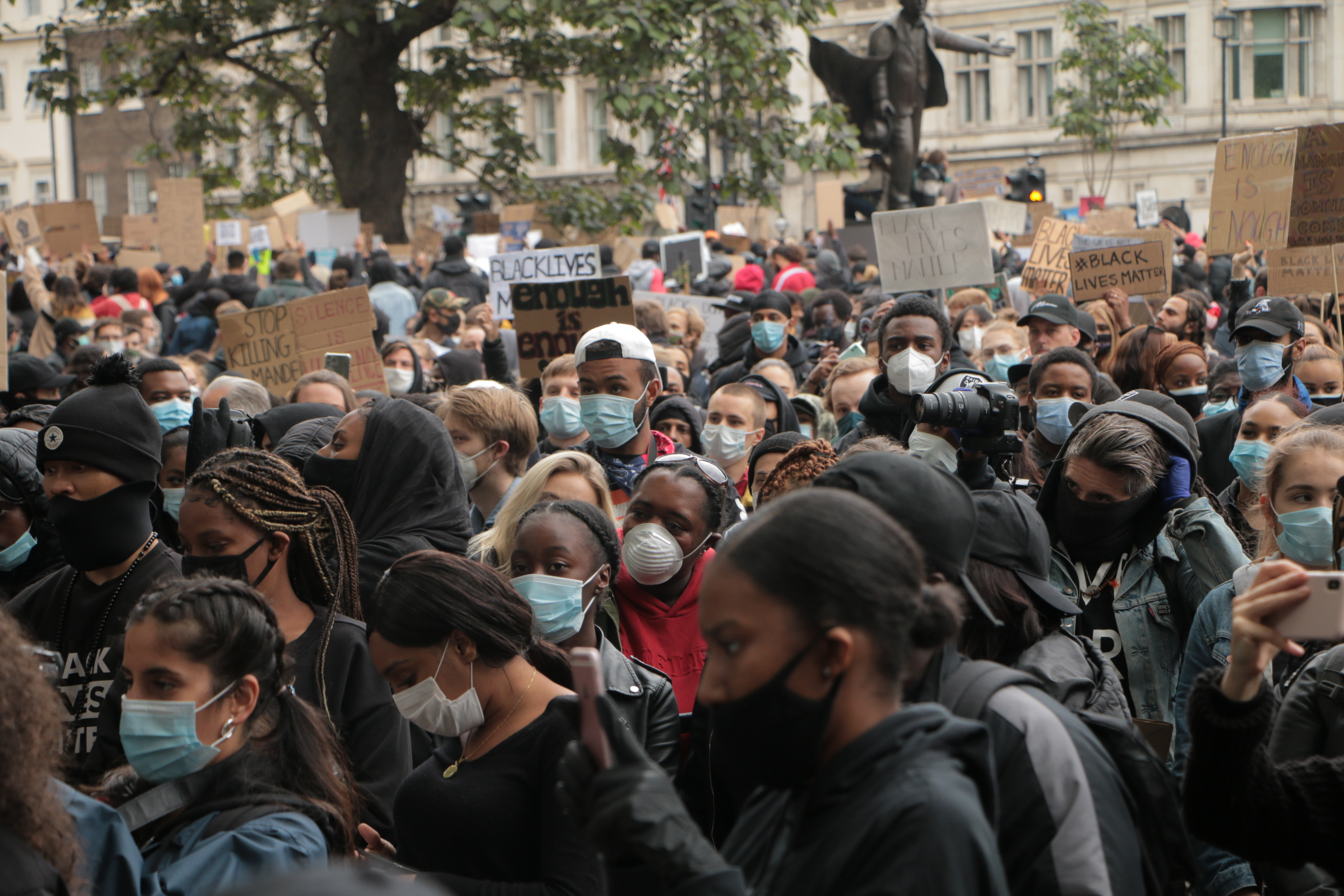
Jords released the single "Black & Ready" in 2020, influenced by the Black Lives Matter protests in London.

Following the Black Lives Matter movement coming into public focus after the murder of George Floyd and the killing of Breonna Taylor, Jords created and released a single called "Black & Ready". The single's name was taken from a sign he carried during protests in central London on 6 June 2020. "Black & Ready" was influenced by the events surrounding the Black Lives Matter movement, with Jords including a protest chant in its lyrics. It went on to get recognition from Ebro Darden and BBC Radio 1Xtra. Proceeds from "Black & Ready" were donated to The Black Curriculum.

In 2021, Jords released a single, "Enemies", in collaboration with Masego and Kadiata. According to Jords, "Enemies" is about moving past conflicts, forgiving and having "no bad energy". The single features idioms from several genres, including two-step beats, hand claps and lounge piano. Writing for The Line of Best Fit, Olivia Swash described "Enemies" as "an instant classic". The song appeared on Jords' later album, Dirt in the Diamond.

Jords was one of ten artists named on BBC Radio 1Xtra's Hot For 2022 list, cited for his work with D Double E and Maxi Priest, and his support from BBC Music Introducing. In May 2022, Jords was approached by Motown at The Great Escape Festival to join the label, becoming the first British rap act to be signed to Motown. He released his debut album on the label, Dirt in the Diamond, on 26 May 2023. Themed around "growing and manoeuvring through life with your brothers", it includes tracks that are tributes to his Jamaican ancestors and family, produced over five years. The album's name refers to preconceptions of Jords being labelled a "diamond in the rough" because of his birthplace, which he argues "insinuates that everything around you is rough"; he flipped the phrase to represent how "everyone is a diamond but we all have these bits of dirt within us" to improve on. A track on the album, "iPray", features Wretch 32, one of the rappers who Jords grew up listening to and was inspired by. Other artists who feature on the album include Kranium and Tay Iwar. Dirt In The Diamond received a positive reception from music critics, with BBC News' Mark Savage describing it as "a thoughtful, powerful and bold exploration of identity and self-acceptance that transcends the norms of UK rap". Released alongside the album was a short film made by the Nigerian director Renee Osubu. The film lasts for 20 minutes and is about a British-Caribbean family holding a nine-night wake for their dead child. It was described by The Independent's Ellie Muir as "reminiscent of Steve McQueen's 2020 Small Axe anthology".

=== Other ventures ===
With his school friend Jamahl Rowl, Jords produces Almost a Conversation, a talk-based podcast where he discusses topics with his friends and guests. It grew out of a group chat Jords was part of with his brother and friends, which progressed to Zoom calls and then the podcast. Past guests include Big Zuu, George the Poet and Joy Crookes.

To help children who may not be able to afford school uniforms, Jords set up the Pickni Uniforms charity with Rowl in September 2020. After seeing long lines for school uniforms in Croydon, he was going to start a school uniform business to capitalise on the demand but, inspired by the footballer Marcus Rashford's similar scheme for school meals, he decided to give uniforms away for free. By 2021, the charity had given away 117 blazers to Croydon students on free school meals. Pickni Uniforms also helps recycle old uniforms in collaboration with the QPR Community Trust. Jords also runs a jewellery business.

In 2023, Jords was appointed executive producer of PlayFight, a one-act West End play written by Christina Alagaratnam about how racism affects black males in education. During its runs at the Seven Dials Playhouse and The Pleasance, the play received generally positive reviews and praise for its insight into sensitive topics.

== Discography ==
Albums

- Almost an Adult (2020)
- Dirt in the Diamond (2023)

Mixtapes

- Means to an Ends (2016)
- Mixtape J (2025)
