= Woman (Little Simz song) =

Single by Little Simz featuring Cleo Sol

from the album Sometimes I Might Be Introvert
- Released: 6 May 2021
- Genre: Hip hop
- Length: 4:29
- Label: Age 101; AWAL
- Songwriter(s): Simbiatu Ajikawo; Cleopatra Nikolic; Dean Josiah Cover
- Producer(s): Inflo

Little Simz singles chronology
| "Introvert" (2021) | "Woman" (2021) | "Rollin Stone" (2021) |

Cleo Sol singles chronology
| "Shine" (2020) | "Woman" (2021) |

Music video
- "Woman" on YouTube

"Woman" is a song by British rapper Little Simz featuring fellow British singer Cleo Sol. It was released on 6 May 2021, as the second single from the former's fourth studio album Sometimes I Might Be Introvert (2021). The song was written by Simz, Sol, and record producer Inflo.

A retro hip-hop song, "Woman" discusses women's lives in different countries. Simz wrote the song to thank women who inspired her, stating, "It's empowering, it's inspiring; I wanted to say thank you and I wanted to celebrate them." The chorus is sung by Sol.

== Release and composition ==
Simz and Sol first collaborated on the song "Selfish" from Simz's third studio album Grey Area (2019). Aside from their collaboration in "Woman" for Simz's fourth studio album Sometimes I Might Be Introvert (2021), Sol provided guest vocals on the album's lead single "Introvert".

"Woman" was released on 6 May 2021, by Simz's label Age 101, as the second single from the album. A lyric video was uploaded to Simz's YouTube channel on 10 June 2021.

Consequence's Nina Corcoran described "Woman" as a "low-key retro hip-hop number that sees Simz rapping about the women around the world who inspire [Simz] to carry on." The song contains an organ and snappy snares. The rapper, who described the song as "empowering" and "inspiring", stated that she wrote the song "to say thank you and I wanted to celebrate" women. Sol sings in the chorus: "I love how you go from zero to one hundred/And leave the dust behind, you've got this/All action, no talk". Simz wanted to create a song dedicated to women, and explained with Vulture the inspiration behind the song:

"Woman" is literally a love note to the women of the world. I think it very much so happens in this industry where it gets competitive, which is okay, but I think not [if it gets] to a place where you're literally trying to drag and tear other women down because the narrative is, "There can only be one at a time," or whatever it is. "Woman" is for us to celebrate and commend each other and tell each other we look beautiful and we're proud of each other.

== Music video ==
The music video was released the same day as the single, and was directed by Simz. It featured guest appearances from Jourdan Dunn, Joy Crookes, and Denai Moore. A trailer was uploaded on Simz's YouTube account on 3 May 2021. As of December 2022, the video has received over 5 million views.

== Live performances ==
Simz first performed "Woman" on The Tonight Show Starring Jimmy Fallon on 16 August 2021. On 28 May 2021, she performed the song on Later... with Jools Holland. The song was sung as a medley with "Introvert" at the 2022 Brit Awards. "Woman" was also included on the rapper's set list at Glastonbury Festival 2022, in which Sol joined her onstage.

== Credits and personnel ==
Credits adapted from the liner notes of Sometimes I Might Be Introvert.

- Little Simz – lead vocals, songwriting
- Cleo Sol – featured vocals, songwriting
- Inflo – backing vocals, songwriting, drums, bass, guitar, synthesizer, production
- Caroline Adeyemi – additional vocals
- Graham Godfrey – percussion
- Miles James – rhythm guitar, bass
- Kadeem Clarke – additional synthesizer, organ, piano, keyboards
- Rosie Danvers – orchestral arrangements
- Ben Baptie – mixing, engineering
- Richard Woodcraft – mixing, engineering
- Sophie Ellis – engineering assistance
- Matt Colton – mastering
