= A Curious Tale of Trials + Persons =

Studio album by Little Simz
- Released: 18 September 2015
- Studio: Red Bull Studios (London)
- Genre: Hip-hop
- Length: 34:57
- Label: Age 101 Music

Little Simz chronology
Time Capsule (2014)	A Curious Tale of Trials + Persons (2015)	Stillness in Wonderland (2016)

Singles from A Curious Tale of Trials + Persons
- 1. "Wings" Released: 12 August 2015; 2. "Dead Body" Released: 17 August 2015

A Curious Tale of Trials + Persons is the debut studio album by English rapper Little Simz, released on 18 September 2015 through Age 101 Music. The album won Independent Album of the Year at the 2016 AIM Independent Music Awards.

== Release ==
On 12 August 2015, Little Simz announced the album and released the single "Wings". The album's second single, "Dead Body", was released on 17 August 2015, alongside a music video. On 23 September 2015, she released a remix to "Dead Body", titled "Dead Body Part 2+3" featuring Stormzy and Kano.

== Critical reception ==
Professional ratings
Aggregate scores
Source	Rating
AnyDecentMusic?	7.3/10
Metacritic	80/100
Review scores
Source	Rating
The 405	8.5/10
The Guardian	3/5 stars
HipHopDX	4/5
Mixmag	9/10
Pitchfork	7.8/10

According to the review aggregator Metacritic, A Curious Tale of Trials + Persons received "generally favorable reviews" based on a weighted average score of 80 out of 100 from 6 critic scores.

Jesse Fairfax of HipHopDX commended the album for its innovation, stating: "Where most newer Hip Hop artists play it safe until they build enough of an audience, Little Simz pushes the envelope giving her all to a scene that may not know what to make of her. Taking the initiative to claim herself a leader, she makes a powerful statement for womanhood in a genre often closed to anything short of objectification." Pitchfork's Jia Tolentino argues that the album's independent release kept it more authentic, stating: "she's keeping her talent under her own strict control, which means, by one calculus, curbing it. Instead of an album spiked with a big banging single, she offers a looping, obsessively focused experience, with her words providing structure and the pulsing orchestral instrumentation coming second." Writing for The 405, Samantha O'Connor concludes, writing "A Curious Tale of Trials + Persons is the most multifaceted and masterful contemporary feminist rap album of recent memory."

=== Accolades ===
Publication	Accolade	Rank	Ref.
The 405	The 30 Best Albums of 2015	5	
Clash	Albums Of The Year 2015	21	
The Line of Best Fit	The Fifty Best Albums of 2015	—N/a	
Loud And Quiet	Top 40 Albums Of 2015	30	
Noisey	The 50 Best Albums of 2015	23	
Time Out	The 50 best albums of 2015	38	

=== Awards ===
Awards and nominations for A Curious Tale of Trials + Persons
Ceremony	Year	Category	Result	Ref.
AIM Independent Music Awards	2016	Independent Album of the Year	Won	

== Track listing ==
No.	Title	Length
1.	"Persons"	2:04
2.	"Wings"	4:06
3.	"The Lights"	4:00
4.	"Tainted"	4:01
5.	"Gratitude" (featuring The Hics)	3:37
6.	"God Bless Mary"	4:16
7.	"Dead Body"	3:52
8.	"Full or Empty"	4:24
9.	"This Is Not An Outro"	2:41
10.	"Fallen"	1:53
Total length:		34:57

== Charts ==
Chart performance for A Curious Tale of Trials + Persons
Chart (2015)	Peak position
UK Album Downloads (Official Charts)	100
UK Independent Albums (Official Charts)	43
UK R&B Albums (Official Charts)	20
