= Libera Award for Best Hip-Hop/Rap Record =

Annual US music award

- Awarded for: quality hip-hip and rap records
- Country: United States
- Presented by: American Association of Independent Music (A2IM)
- First award: 2017
- Currently held by: Kenny Beats, Louie; Run the Jewels, RTJ Cu4tro (2023)
- Website: liberaawards.com

The Libera Award for Best Hip-Hop/Rap Record (known as Best Hip-Hop/Rap Album prior to 2021) is an award presented by the American Association of Independent Music at the annual Libera Award which recognizes "best hip hop or rap album released commercially in the United States by an independent label" since 2017.

Hip-hop duo Run the Jewels was the first recipient of the award for their album Run the Jewels 3. They are also the only artists who have won the award for than once, with two wins, the second being in 2021 for RTJ4.

== Winners and nominees ==
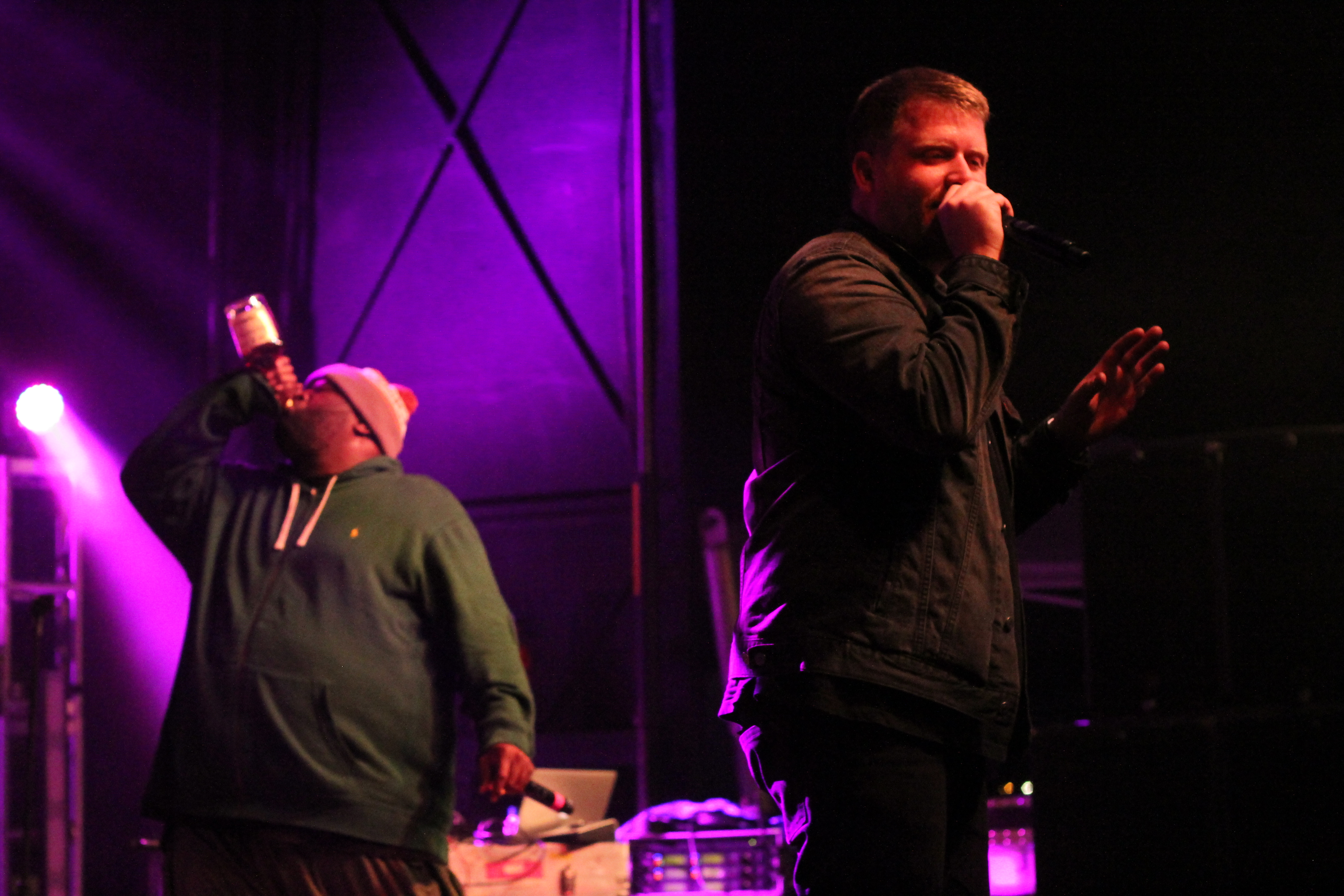
Run the Jewels was the inaugural winner in 2017.

Year	Winner(s)	Work	Nominees	Ref.
2017	Run the Jewels	Run the Jewels 3	The Impossible Kid – Aesop Rock; And the Anonymous Nobody... – De La Soul; Good Luck and Do Your Best – Gold Panda; 99.9% – Kaytranada; Yes Lawd! – NxWorries; The Storm – Tech N9ne	
2018	Shabazz Palaces	Quazarz: Born on a Gangster Star	Harder Than Hard – Lil Baby; Gems from the Equinox – Meyhem Lauren & DJ Muggs; Imperius Rex – Sean Price; The Saga Continues – Wu-Tang Clan	
2019	Awkwafina	In Fina We Trust	August Greene – August Greene; Joe Fontana – Myke Bogan; Famous Cryp – Blueface; JP3 – Junglepussy	
2020	Danny Brown	uknowhatimsayin¿	The Big Day – Chance the Rapper; There Existed an Addiction to Blood – Clipping; ZUU – Denzel Curry; Fever – Megan Thee Stallion	
2021	Run the Jewels	RTJ4	Visions of Bodies Being Burned – Clipping; Drop 6 – Little Simz; Little Dominiques Nosebleed – The Koreatown Oddity; Startisha – Naeem	
2022	Little Simz	Sometimes I Might Be Introvert	Broken Hearts and Beauty Sleep – Mykki Blanco; By the Time I Get to Phoenix – Injury Reserve; Elephant in the Room – Mick Jenkins; Off the Yak – Young M.A; "Your Heart" – Joyner Lucas & J. Cole	
2023	Kenny Beats	Louie	Cheat Codes – Danger Mouse and Black Thought; Melt My Eyez See Your Future – Denzel Curry; Few Good Things – Saba; As Above, So Below – Sampa the Great	
2023	Run the Jewels	RTJ Cu4tro	Cheat Codes – Danger Mouse and Black Thought; Melt My Eyez See Your Future – Denzel Curry; Few Good Things – Saba; As Above, So Below – Sampa the Great	

== Artists that received multiple wins ==
3 wins

- Run the Jewels

== Artists that received multiple nominations ==
3 nominations

- Run the Jewels

2 nominations

- Clipping
- Little Simz
- Denzel Curry
