= No Thank You (album) =

Studio album by Little Simz
- Released: 12 December 2022
- Studio: Rue Boyer Studios (Paris)
- Genre: Hip-hop
- Length: 49:56
- Label: Forever Living Originals, AWAL
- Producer: Inflo

Little Simz chronology
Sometimes I Might Be Introvert (2021)	No Thank You (2022)	Drop 7 (2024)

No Thank You (stylised in all caps) is the fifth studio album by English rapper Little Simz. It was released on 12 December 2022 through the independent label Forever Living Originals after being announced less than a week prior. No Thank You is a hip-hop album containing elements of gospel, afrobeat, soul, funk, and electronic music.

The songs on No Thank You contain subtle rhythms with orchestral instrumentation, featuring Simz rapping about her music industry experiences, intrapersonal communication, and spiritual revelations. Simz worked with longtime collaborators Inflo (for production) and Cleo Sol (for background vocals) to create this project. Simz released a ten-minute short film on 16 December 2022 to accompany the album.

The album received critical acclaim from music critics, who praised its emotional depth, smooth production, and Simz's lyrical quality. Despite being released at the end of the year, The Daily Telegraph declared No Thank You the best UK rap album of 2022, while Rolling Stone, BrooklynVegan and other publications also ranked the album highly in their respective year-end lists.

== Background ==
In 2021, Little Simz released her previous studio album Sometimes I Might Be Introvert, which became her first album to place in the top-ten of the UK Album Chart (at number four), and was ranked one of the best music releases of 2021 by critics. The album also received industry accolades throughout 2022, including a nomination for the Brit Award for British Album of the Year, a Libera Award for Best Hip-Hop/Rap Record, a Mercury Prize, and Best Album at the MOBO Awards.

Simz also saw setbacks in 2022, including a cancelled US tour, citing financial restrictions as an independent artist.

== Music ==
=== Composition ===
No Thank You has ten songs and clocks in at just under fifty minutes. Musically, it is a hip-hop album with influences from gospel, funk, R&B, and electronic music. Cleo Sol is a featured vocalist on the album, adding a "soulful energy" to contrast Simz's "assertive" rapping. The songs on No Thank You have long instrumental codas that are highlighted by Inflo's "lushly" and "inventive" arrangements filled with choral vocals and "swelling" strings. These musical touches were compared to works from David Axelrod and Charles Stepney, though "without ever seeming like straightforward homage." No Thank You was further described as "atmospheric" and "melancholic".

Hip Hop Golden Age staff compared the release with Simz's previous two studio albums, saying the "neo soul direction" of No Thank You lands somewhere between the "short and punchy" energy of Grey Area, and the "sprawling and grandiose" nature of Sometimes I Might Be Introvert. Jack Lynch of Hypebeat highlighted the lyrical themes, saying: "[...] we hear the struggles that came with killing her ego, navigating a male-dominated rap industry, and how her love affiliations have been difficult to manage while staying embedded in her faith." i writer Kate Solomon summarised the record's mood: "Hard beats are absent, in their place dreamy funk riffs and laidback flows that are in no hurry to get where they're going. There is anger but it is eclipsed by confidence and a sense of righteousness."

=== Songs ===
On the minimalist album opener, "Angel", Simz analyses her rise to stardom with a "Prince-style pun" on master ownership. A "reflective" track with "electronic coos," the song pays tribute to Simz's late childhood friend Harry Uzoka, a famous model who was killed in a stabbing in January 2018, and also examines Simz's fame, music industry complications, and personal endurance. Dylan Green of Pitchfork noted how "fully relaxed" Simz sounds on track two, "Gorilla", which samples a Jurassic 5 bassline. Green highlights the "triumphant" and "victorious mood" of the song, accentuated by its bass plunks, drums, and horns, adding how "Gorilla" is "a retort against rap game bullshit". Track three, "Silhouette", contains gospel influences, and James Keith of Complex Networks also noted strong gospel elements running throughout the whole album. The outro of "Silhouette" features "dramatic orchestration, booming drums and backing singers".

Track four, "No Merci", has "whirring synths" and was described as "a brash and inventive track with vintage samples fluttering behind a beat designed to make you move". Track five, "X", is about spiritual guidance and overcoming pain. It features a "wall of percussion" resembling "a marching band, West African drumming and rolling breakbeats". A theme of perseverance runs through track six, "Heart on Fire". On the seventh track, "Broken", Simz explores generational trauma and Black mental health. Uproxx noted the song's "looped melodic sample and hi-hats". Track eight, "Sideways", has a "head-turning blast" of "aggressively" sped-up vocal samples. On the "beautifully warped soft soul" of track nine, "Who Even Cares", Simz sings about on focusing her eyes towards the future with a subtle auto-tuned vocal. The closing track, "Control", is a piano-led number about falling in love.

== Promotion and release ==
Less than a week after winning her MOBO Award in December 2022, Simz announced her new album No Thank You on 6 December 2022 via social media, and the album was made available to pre-save digitally. With the announcement, she wrote: "emotion is energy in motion. honour your truth and feelings. eradicate fear. boundaries are important." On 10 December 2022, Simz revealed the album's release date, track list, cover art (shot by Karolina Wielocha), and producer (Inflo). No Thank You was released to streaming services at midnight on 12 December 2022.

=== Film ===
On 15 December 2022, Simz shared a teaser of a No Thank You film on her Instagram account, announcing its release for the follow day. On 16 December 2022, she released the ten-minute No Thank You short film to accompany the album. The film, directed by Gabriel Moses, features five songs from the album. In order, they are "X", "Silhouette", "Sideways", "Broken" and "Heart on Fire". Emma Wilkes from NME noted how these songs are "combined with visuals that present the rapper as a giant presiding over a flock and delivering her lines before a crowd of wealthy observers. Larisha Paul from Rolling Stone felt that "Throughout the film, Simz settles into a lead role surrounded by other Black performers to not only reject praise provided by external validation, but also reject the harmful myth of the strong Black women that more often than not erases the sympathy of human struggle by discrediting emotions that don't line up with the preconceived narrative prescribed to them."

== Critical reception ==
Professional ratings
Aggregate scores
Source	Rating
AnyDecentMusic?	8.4/10
Metacritic	86/100
Review scores
Source	Rating
AllMusic	4/5 stars
The Daily Telegraph	5/5 stars
Evening Standard	4/5 stars
Gigwise	9/10 stars
The Guardian	4/5 stars
i	5/5 stars
NME	4/5 stars
Pitchfork	7.7/10
Rolling Stone	4/5 stars
The Skinny	4/5 stars

No Thank You received widespread critical acclaim from music critics, who complimented Inflo's smooth production and Simz's lyrical depth. On Metacritic, which assigns a normalised score out of 100 to ratings from publications, the album received a weighted mean score of 86 based on 13 reviews, indicating "universal acclaim".

Reviewing the album for AllMusic, Timothy Monger compared the album favourably to its predecessor; "Released barely a year after her Mercury Prize-winner, Sometimes I Might Be Introvert, No Thank You is another tightly focused effort that plays out on a slightly smaller scale but with equally satisfying results." Neil McCormick of The Daily Telegraph declared No Thank You the best UK rap album of 2022. Financial Times writer Ludovic Hunter-Tilney shared a similar sentiment, saying the album "confirms [Little Simz's] place at the summit of UK rap, and also the single-mindedness that has driven her to reach it." Kate Solomon of i gave the album a five-star rating, calling it one of the best releases of Simz's career.

David Smyth of Evening Standard said Little Simz and Inflo are "still innovating at a skyscraping level". In a review for BrooklynVegan, Andrew Sacher summarised the album: "No Thank You has gorgeous production, samples, and backing vocals, but for the most part, Simz doesn't dress her messages up in anything fancy. She has a lot of important stuff to say, and the world would benefit from taking the time to listen to her." The Skinny wrote "the inimitable Little Simz returns with her limitless, abundant growth", adding how she shows "her irrepressible force and talent".

The track "Broken" was singled out as an album highlight by critics for its emotional rawness, with Hip Hop Golden Age calling it "one of the best songs you’ll hear this year". NPR named "Gorilla" the 100th best song of 2022, saying how Simz "displays command of her punchy rhymes with a cadence so casual it feels as if she could deliver them in her sleep."

=== Accolades ===
No Thank You on year-end lists
Publication	List	Rank	Ref.
BrooklynVegan	30 Best Rap Albums of 2022	14	
Complex Networks	Complex UK's Best Albums of 2022	7	
Dazed	The Best Hip-Hop Albums of 2022	4	
Evening Standard	The Albums of the Year 2022	Unranked	
Rolling Stone	The 25 Best Hip-Hop Albums of 2022	14	
WFUV	Best of 2022 Staff Picks	Unranked	
Wonderland	Wonderland's Favourite Albums of 2022	Unranked	

No Thank You songs on year-end lists
Publication	List	Rank	Ref.
NPR	The 100 Best Songs of 2022	100 – "Gorilla"	

== Track listing ==
All tracks are written by Simbiatu Ajikawo, Cleopatra Nikolic, and Dean Josiah Cover, except where noted.

No Thank You track listing
No.	Title	Writer(s)	Length
1.	"Angel"		5:52
2.	"Gorilla"	Dean Josiah Cover; Simbiatu Ajikawo	4:05
3.	"Silhouette"		6:33
4.	"No Merci"	Cover; Ajikawo	5:17
5.	"X"		6:04
6.	"Heart on Fire"		3:58
7.	"Broken"	Cover; Ajikawo	7:29
8.	"Sideways"		2:10
9.	"Who Even Cares"		4:37
10.	"Control"		3:47
Total length:			49:56

== Personnel ==
- Little Simz – lead vocals
- Inflo – production (all tracks), group background vocals (track 4), programming (5)
- Ben Baptie – mastering, mixing, engineering (all tracks); additional programming engineering (9)
- Todd Monfalcone – engineering
- Rosie Danvers – arrangement (1–7)
- Cleo Sol – group background vocals (1, 3, 5, 6, 8, 9)
- Angel Gospel Choir – group background vocals (1–3, 5, 7, 8)
- Hannah Khemoh – group background vocals (5)
- Abbey Road Orchestra – group background vocals (7)
- Kojo Degraft-Johnson – group background vocals (10)
- Nathaniel Warner – group background vocals (10)
- Paul Lee – group background vocals (10)
- Chris Dave — drums (2, 5, 7, 9, 10)

== Charts ==
Chart performance for No Thank You
Chart (2022–23)	Peak position
Australian Vinyl Albums (ARIA)	7
Belgian Albums (Ultratop Flanders)	51
German Albums (Offizielle Top 100)	11
New Zealand Albums (RMNZ)	40
Scottish Albums (OCC)	9
Swiss Albums (Schweizer Hitparade)	41
UK Albums (OCC)	40
UK Independent Albums (OCC)	4
UK R&B Albums (OCC)	1
US Top Current Album Sales (Billboard)	61

== See also ==
- List of UK R&B Albums Chart number ones of 2023
