= Iluvlive =

British entertainment company

iluvlive
- Company type: Not-for-profit
- Industry: Entertainment
- Founded: July 8, 2014; 11 years ago
- Headquarters: London, United Kingdom
- Key people: Rachael Bee
- Services: Concert production; Artist management; Record Label
- Website: www.iluvlive.co.uk

iluvlive was founded in 2004 and is a not for profit company supported by Arts Council England and became a national portfolio company in April 2015. Initially launched by Jade Richardson (A&R Virgin Records), it is now owned by Rachael Bee who is also CEO. iluvlive is a live music and artist development company running showcase events, promoted shows for artists and an artist development programme. They also have a management arm and record label.

== History ==
Initially a London-based showcase hosted by Ras Kwame and Twin B, they are known for supporting Ed Sheeran, Jessie J, Tinie Tempah, Emeli Sandé, Chip, Wretch 32, Ray BLK, Izzy Bizu, Little Simz, Krept and Konan, Ms Banks, Kojey Radical, Ella Mai, Tom Grennan, Shakka, and Mahalia years before they were signed.
