= Stillness in Wonderland =

Studio album by Little Simz
- Released: 16 December 2016
- Genre: Hip-hop
- Length: 44:28
- Language: English
- Label: Age 101 Music

Little Simz chronology
A Curious Tale of Trials + Persons (2015)	Stillness in Wonderland (2016)	Grey Area (2019)

Singles from Stillness In Wonderland
- 1. "Poison Ivy" Released: 12 December 2016; 2. "Picture Perfect" Released: 14 December 2016; 3. "Backseat" Released: 11 May 2017; 4. "Good For What" Released: 11 October 2017

Stillness in Wonderland is the second studio album by English rapper Little Simz, released on 16 December 2016 through Age 101 Music.

== Release ==
On 12 December 2016, Little Simz announced the album and released the lead single, "Poison Ivy". On 14 December 2016, she released the album's second single, "Picture Perfect". The album released on 16 December 2016. She also released a comic book series as a companion to the album titled Welcome to Wonderland.

On 11 May 2017, she released the first single for the deluxe version of the album, "Backseat". The second single for the deluxe version, "Good For What", was released on 11 October 2017. The deluxe version of the album was released on 3 November 2017.

== Critical reception ==
Professional ratings
Aggregate scores
Source	Rating
Metacritic	84/100
Review scores
Source	Rating
Exclaim!	8/10
The Observer	4/5 stars
Pretty Much Amazing	B Plus
Pitchfork	7.1/10

According to the review aggregator Metacritic, Stillness in Wonderland received "universal acclaim" based on a weighted average score of 84 out of 100 from 7 critic scores. Pretty Much Amazing's Mick Jacobs praised the song composition in the album, writing: "Her compositions, like Ajikawo herself, defy expectation, transitioning mid-track to blossom into entirely new flowers." Christine Clarke of Now commended the album's lyricism and themes, writing: "It’s clear this is Simz’s version of Lewis Carroll’s Alice's Adventures in Wonderland, only darker and full of imagery springing from the city rather than the English countryside. When spun by Simz’s deft lyricism, Wonderland takes on many forms." Kyle Mullin of Exclaim! praised the album's production, such as the "elephant trunk trumpets and joyfully funky groove" of "Picture Perfect" which "evokes Missy Elliott in her prime", the "hypnotic, techno-ish groove" of "King of Hearts", the "jazzy horns straight out of a vintage noir flick" of "No More Wonderland", the "irresistible [...] radio-smash-ready upbeat synths" of "Shotgun", the "funky, reggae-tinged" "One in Rotation", and the "flamboyantly funky sax sample" of "Doorways + Trust Issues". Writing for The Observer, Isa Jaward concludes by writing "London-born Simz speaks candidly about love, growing up and intuition as she journeys down the rabbit hole of self-discovery. The album’s mix of soul, R&B, grime and trippy, jazz-tinged interludes is at times a little muddled, but Simz’s lyrical agility and deft rapping sit comfortably with a variety of production styles."

=== Accolades ===
Publication	Accolade	Rank	Ref.
Pigeons & Planes	Best Albums of 2016	37	

=== Awards ===
Awards and nominations for Stillness In Wonderland
Ceremony	Category	Result	Ref.
2017 AIM Independent Music Awards	Best Difficult Second Album	Nominated	

== Track listing ==
No.	Title	Length
1.	"LMPD" (featuring Chronixx)	4:04
2.	"Cheshire's Interlude: Welcome to Wonderland"	1:02
3.	"Doorways + Trust Issues"	4:13
4.	"Her - Interlude"	1:57
5.	"One In Rotation + Wide Awake" (featuring Sir)	3:55
6.	"Shotgun" (featuring Syd)	3:08
7.	"Picture Perfect"	3:03
8.	"Cheshire's Interlude: Misled"	0:44
9.	"King of Hearts" (featuring Chip and Ghetts)	3:32
10.	"Bad to the Bone" (featuring Bibi Bourelly)	3:15
11.	"Zone 3" (featuring Tilla, Josh Arce, and Chuck 20)	3:41
12.	"Poison Ivy" (featuring Tilla)	3:29
13.	"Cheshire's Interlude: Stay"	0:41
14.	"Low Tides"	4:00
15.	"No More Wonderland"	3:37
Total length:		44:28

Deluxe edition
No.	Title	Length
16.	"Our Conversations" (featuring BadBadNotGood)	6:03
17.	"Backseat"	3:31
18.	"Out of sight (yhyh)"	4:31
19.	"Morning" (featuring Swooping Duck)	3:23
20.	"Phases" (featuring Sir)	4:36
21.	"Days Like This - Interlude" (featuring Josh Arce)	3:14
22.	"Customz" (featuring Bibi Bourelly)	4:01
23.	"Good for What"	2:53
Total length:		72:12
