= Sometimes I Might Be Introvert =

Studio album by Little Simz
- Released: 3 September 2021
- Recorded: 2019–2020
- Genres: Hip hop; soul; R&B; electronica; Afrobeat; jazz
- Length: 65:12
- Labels: Age 101; AWAL
- Producers: Inflo; Jakwob; Miles James

Little Simz chronology
| Drop 6 (2020) | Sometimes I Might Be Introvert (2021) | No Thank You (2022) |

Singles from Sometimes I Might Be Introvert
- 1. "Introvert" Released: 21 April 2021; 2. "Woman" Released: 6 May 2021; 3. "Rollin Stone" Released: 14 June 2021; 4. "I Love You, I Hate You" Released: 8 July 2021; 5. "Point and Kill" Released: 1 September 2021

Sometimes I Might Be Introvert is the fourth studio album by English rapper Little Simz. It was released on 3 September 2021, by Age 101 Music and AWAL. The album succeeds the Mercury Prize-nominated album, Grey Area (2019) and the five-track extended play (EP), Drop 6 (2020). It is supported by five singles: "Introvert", "Woman", "Rollin Stone", "I Love You, I Hate You", and "Point and Kill". The album was produced by frequent collaborator Inflo and it includes guest appearances from Cleo Sol and Obongjayar.

The album received widespread acclaim and was named the best album of 2021 by Exclaim! and BBC Radio 6 Music. It won the 2022 Mercury Prize on 18 October 2022. It was also nominated for the Best Album Ivor Novello Award in May 2022. It also won the Libera Award for Best Hip-Hop/Rap Record and was nominated for the Brit Award for British Album of the Year. Sometimes I Might Be Introvert has since been considered to be among the greatest hip-hop albums of the 21st century and was included in Rolling Stone's ranking of the 200 Greatest Hip-Hop Albums of All Time.

== Title and concept ==
The album title is a backronym of Simbi, which is part of Simz's full first name, Simbiatu. Speaking on the album title to The Guardian, Little Simz commented: "I'm just very to myself and I didn't know how to really navigate that, especially coming in this industry where you're expected to have this extroverted persona all the time. I wanted to just let people know like, yo, I'm actually this way inclined […] When it comes to business and my work, I'm not shy at all, I don't hold back with that. I'm very serious and direct, but other stuff sometimes." Thematically, Sometimes I Might Be Introvert is about Simz "being this introverted person that has all these crazy thoughts and ideas and theories in my head and not always feeling like I’m able to express it if it’s not through my art."

== Release and promotion ==
Little Simz announced the album's title, cover art, release date, and preorder on 21 April 2021. The first single, "Introvert", was released alongside its music video on 21 April 2021. The second single, "Woman" featuring Cleo Sol, was released on 6 May 2021 with a music video directed by Little Simz. The track "Rollin Stone" was released as the third single on 14 June 2021, followed by "I Love You, I Hate You" as the fourth single on 8 July 2021. A fifth single, "Point and Kill" featuring Obongjayar, was released on 1 September 2021, followed by a music video.

An accompanying European tour was announced on 28 May 2021, scheduled for winter 2021 and early 2022.

== Chart performance ==
The album debuted at number four on the UK Albums Chart, becoming her highest charting album and first top forty. The album was the biggest selling album in independent record shops the week of its release.

== Critical reception ==
Professional ratings
Aggregate scores
| Source | Rating |
|---|---|
| AnyDecentMusic? | 8.8/10 |
| Metacritic | 88/100 |
Review scores
| Source | Rating |
| AllMusic | 5/5 stars |
| Clash | 8/10 |
| The Daily Telegraph | 5/5 stars |
| Entertainment Weekly | B |
| The Guardian | 4/5 stars |
| The Independent | 5/5 stars |
| The Line of Best Fit | 10/10 |
| Pitchfork | 7.7/10 |
| The Skinny | 4/5 stars |
| Uncut | 8/10 |

The album received widespread acclaim from critics. At Metacritic, which assigns a normalized rating out of 100 to reviews from professional publications, the album received an average score of 88, based on 24 reviews, indicating "universal acclaim".

In the review for AllMusic Timothy Monger compared the album favourably to its predecessor; "As on Grey Area, there are no dry spells or dips in quality, just a master class in modern songwriting with heaps of poise and a beating, soulful heart." Lee Wakefield for Clash wrote that Sometimes I Might Be Introvert makes for "addictive listening", adding that "the cinematic flourishes are cranked up and Simz is more confessional than ever, pondering what defines her as both Little Simz the artist and Simbi the person." Uncut concluded it was "an even more ambitious conceptual album that finds her sharing her insecurities, praising her heroes and going on a fairytale voyage over 19 tracks." Writing for The Independent, Helen Brown described it as "the most thrilling album of the year", praising the "Bond theme-level orchestration" in the production and Little Simz's lyricism. Rachel Aroesti, writing for The Guardian, concluded Sometimes I Might Be Introvert "may or may not provide a commercial boost for its maker, but this rich, fascinating album cements Little Simz’s significance regardless."

Entertainment Weekly noted that Little Simz "once again showcases her vulnerability, opening up old wounds from relationships with her father, a past lover, and, ultimately, herself." PJ Somerville from The Line of Best Fit commented that "Talking family, trauma, the industry and her peers, Sometimes I Might Be Introvert is tactical, theatrical, and is the product of 100,000 hours spent honing her craft resulting in a body of work with heart, and its head firmly on its shoulders." Granting the record Album of the Week, James Rettig for Stereogum declared Sometimes I Might Be Introvert as Simz's "most personal album yet but also her most removed, in the sense that it’s cinematic and surreal and overwhelming", praising the subject matter and "sweeping orchestral" production. PopMatters' John Amen praised the album, writing that Simz "moves from stream-of-consciousness confessions to epigrammatic observations, volatile rants to equanimous self-examinations, and personal confessions to broad societal diagnoses."

Hip Hop Golden Age compared the album to Lauryn Hill's The Miseducation of Lauryn Hill (1998), saying it "echoes Lauryn Hill's masterpiece (...) in ambition, scope, musicality and timelessness".

=== Accolades ===
Sometimes I Might Be Introvert on year-end lists
| Publication | List | Rank | Ref. |
|---|---|---|---|
| BBC Radio 6 Music | Albums of the Year 2021 | 1 | |
| Consequence of Sound | Top 50 Albums of 2021 | 5 | |
| Exclaim! | The 50 Best Albums of 2021 | 1 | |
| The Guardian | The 50 Best Albums of 2021 | 3 | |
| Hip Hop Golden Age | The Best Hip Hop Albums of 2021 | 1 | |
| NPR Music | The 50 Best Albums of 2021 | 2 | |
| Paste | The 50 Best Albums of 2021 | 4 | |
| Pitchfork | The 50 Best Albums of 2021 | 29 | |
| Rolling Stone | The 50 Best Albums of 2021 | 36 | |
| Rolling Stone | The 200 Greatest Hip-Hop Albums of All Time | 180 | |
| Variety | Chris Willman's Top 10 Albums of 2021 | 6 | |

Awards and nominations for Sometimes I Might Be Introvert
| Year | Award | Category | Result | Ref. |
|---|---|---|---|---|
| 2022 | Brit Award | British Album of the Year | Nominated | |
| 2022 | NME Awards | Best Album in the World | Nominated | |
| 2022 | NME Awards | Best Album by a UK Artist | Nominated | |
| 2022 | Libera Awards | Best Hip-Hop/Rap Record | Won | |
| 2022 | Mercury Prize | Album of the Year | Won | |
| 2022 | MOBO Awards | Album of the Year | Won (Note: Joint winner with Alpha Place by Knucks) | |

== Track listing ==
All tracks are produced by Inflo except for "I See You", co-produced with Miles James, and "Rollin Stone", co-produced with Jakwob.

Sometimes I Might Be Introvert track listing
| No. | Title | Writer(s) | Length |
|---|---|---|---|
| 1. | "Introvert" | Simbiatu Ajikawo; Dean Josiah Cover | 6:02 |
| 2. | "Woman" (featuring Cleo Sol) | Ajikawo; Cleopatra Nikolic; Cover | 4:29 |
| 3. | "Two Worlds Apart" | Ajikawo; Cover | 2:58 |
| 4. | "I Love You, I Hate You" | Ajikawo; Cover | 4:16 |
| 5. | "Little Q, Pt. 1 (Interlude)" | Ajikawo; Cover; Kadeem Clarke; Miles James | 1:08 |
| 6. | "Little Q, Pt. 2" | Ajikawo; Cover; Clarke; James | 3:46 |
| 7. | "Gems (Interlude)" | Ajikawo; Cover; Clarke | 2:57 |
| 8. | "Speed" | Ajikawo; Cover | 2:41 |
| 9. | "Standing Ovation" | Ajikawo; Cover | 4:08 |
| 10. | "I See You" | Ajikawo; Cover; James; Nathan Allen | 3:58 |
| 11. | "The Rapper that Came to Tea (Interlude)" | Ajikawo; Cover; James; Clarke | 2:45 |
| 12. | "Rollin Stone" | Ajikawo; Cover; James Jacob | 3:39 |
| 13. | "Protect My Energy" | Ajikawo; Cover | 3:09 |
| 14. | "Never Make Promises (Interlude)" | Ajikawo; Cover | 1:02 |
| 15. | "Point and Kill" (featuring Obongjayar) | Ajikawo; Cover; Steven Umoh | 3:06 |
| 16. | "Fear No Man" | Ajikawo; Cover | 4:04 |
| 17. | "The Garden (Interlude)" | Ajikawo; Cover; James; Clarke | 2:39 |
| 18. | "How Did You Get Here" | Ajikawo; Cover | 4:57 |
| 19. | "Miss Understood" | Ajikawo; Cover | 3:28 |
| Total length: | | | 65:12 |

Notes

- "Introvert" and the five interludes feature additional vocals by Emma Corrin.
- "Introvert" and "I See You" feature additional vocals by Cleo Sol.

Sample credits

- "Two Worlds Apart" contains samples of "The Agony and the Ecstasy", written and performed by Smokey Robinson.

== Personnel ==
Musicians

- Little Simz – primary artist (all tracks)
- Cleo Sol – featured artist (2)
- Obongjayar – featured artist (15)
- Inflo – production (all tracks)
- Jakwob – production (12)
- Miles James – production (10)
- Emma Corrin – additional vocals
- Rosie Danvers – orchestral arrangements
- Graham Godfrey - percussion
- Caroline Adeyemi – vocals
- Paul Boldeau – vocals
- Phebe Edwards – vocals
- Patrick Linton – vocals
- Desrinea Ramus – vocals
- Olivia Williams – vocals
- Qudus Adidas St. Patrick – vocals

Technical

- Matt Colton – mastering
- Ben Baptie – engineering, mixing
- Richard Woodcraft – engineering, mixing
- Jeremy Cole – creative direction, artwork
- Sophie Ellis – engineering

== Charts ==
Chart performance for Sometimes I Might Be Introvert
| Chart (2021) | Peak position |
|---|---|
| Australian Albums (ARIA) | 40 |
| Austrian Albums (Ö3 Austria) | 15 |
| Belgian Albums (Ultratop Flanders) | 19 |
| Belgian Albums (Ultratop Wallonia) | 64 |
| Dutch Albums (Album Top 100) | 27 |
| German Albums (Offizielle Top 100) | 24 |
| Irish Albums (Official Charts) | 30 |
| Scottish Albums (Official Charts) | 3 |
| Spanish Albums (Promusicae) | 79 |
| Swiss Albums (Schweizer Hitparade) | 19 |
| UK Albums (Official Charts) | 4 |
| UK Independent Albums (Official Charts) | 1 |
| UK R&B Albums (Official Charts) | 1 |
| US Heatseekers Albums (Billboard) | 3 |
| US Independent Albums (Billboard) | 45 |
| US Top Album Sales (Billboard) | 33 |

== Certifications ==
Certifications for Sometimes I Might Be Introvert
| Region | Certification | Certified units/sales |
|---|---|---|
| United Kingdom (BPI) | Silver | 74,056 |

== See also ==
- List of 2021 albums (July–December)
- List of UK Independent Albums Chart number ones of 2021
- List of UK R&B Albums Chart number ones of 2021
- List of UK top-ten albums in 2021
