= Feminist activism in hip-hop =

Feminist activism in hip hop is a feminist movement based by hip hop artists. The activism movement involves doing work in graffiti, break dancing, and hip hop music. Hip hop has a history of being a genre that sexually objectifies and disrespects women ranging from the usage of video vixens to explicit rap lyrics. Within the subcultures of graffiti and breakdancing, sexism is more evident through the lack of representation of women participants. In a genre notorious for its sexualization of women, feminist groups and individual artists who identify as feminists have sought to change the perception and commodification of women in hip hop. This is also rooted in cultural implications of misogyny in rap music.

== Hip hop as a medium for social change ==
Hip hop refers to the "music, arts, media, and cultural movement and community developed by black and Latino youth in the mid-1970's on the east coast of the United States". Hip hop is a growing medium for initiating social change through its music, videos, and culture. Reiland Rabaka, author of Hip Hop's Inheritance, observes that, "the majority of hip hop feminist mobilization at the present moment seems to emerge from cyber-social networks, mass media, and popular culture, rather than nationally networked women's organizations based in government, academic, or male-dominated leftist bureaucracies"; indeed, music videos, as part of popular culture, can be disseminated as mass media through cyber-social networks, making them a perfect platform for motivating change.

Hip hop is often seen as a means of unifying individuals hoping to spread equality, peace, love and social change around the world. As such it resembles other movements that empower people of color, especially young people from all different socioeconomic backgrounds.

T. Hasan Johnson believes hip hop can work as an intersectional platform: "Hip-Hop can be the site whereby . . . meditations and re-evaluations can occur, offering participants the opportunity to re-imagine masculinities and femininities in a multitude of ways to suit a variety of contexts". Rabaka further explains how creative mediums such as hip hop can be used to wreck the interlocking systems of oppression in America: "The point is to offer the women of the hip hop generation feminist and womanist alternatives to the patriarchal (mis)representations of womanhood spewing out of the US. culture industries."

Gwendolyn Pough (2004) argues that hip hop feminists have "found ways to deal with these issues [of sexism and tropes of the video vixen and strong black woman] within the larger public sphere and the counter-public sphere of hip hop by bringing wreck to stereotyped images through their continued use of expressive culture'".

For Pough, "the women of the hip hop generation have created a body of work that offers up feminist or womanist answers to many of the hip hop generation's most urgent interpersonal, cultural, social, and political issues" and "recent feminist scholarship suggests that in its own controversial and/or contradictory way the hip-hop feminist movement may very well be the most politically polyvocal and socially visible manifestation of the ongoing evolution of the Women's Liberation movement prevalent in contemporary US society".

== Hip hop feminism ==
The term hip hop feminism was coined by the provocative cultural critic Joan Morgan in 1999 when she published the book "When Chickenheads Come Home to Roost: A Hip Hop Feminist Breaks it Down". Hip-hop feminism is loosely defined as young feminists born after 1964 who approach the political community with a mixture of feminist and hip-hop sensibilities.

It shares many similarities with black feminism and third-wave feminism, but is a distinct self-identification that carries its own weight and creates its own political spaces. Throughout third-wave feminism which began in the mid-80's, many constructs were destabilized, including the notions of "universal womanhood", body, gender, sexuality, and heteronormativity.

Early movements of this third wave of feminism "were articulated by feminist leaders, many of whom were grounded in the second wave, such as Cherrie Moraga, Gloria Anzualda, Bell hooks, Chela Sandoval, Audre Lorde, Maxine Hong Kingston, and many other feminists of color who called for a 'new subjectivity' in feminist voice."

Hip hop feminism is based in a tradition of black feminism, which emphasizes that the personal is political because race, class, gender, and sexuality determine how black women are treated. An important idea that came out of early black feminism is that of intersectionality, which T. Hasan Johnson describes in his book You Must Learn! A Primer in the Study of Hip Hop Culture as "a term that argues that race, gender, sexuality, and class are interlinked and used to shape hierarchical relationships in American society".

Hip hop feminism is a different kind of feminism than "traditional" feminism; it is a way of thinking and living that is grounded in different lived experiences than the "traditional" feminism of the Women's Liberation Movement, which was a mostly white movement and was more interested in advancing women's rights than civil rights. The hip-hop feminism movement gained traction primarily because there was no avenue for young black women. As human rights activist, Shani Jamila states in her book, Can I Get a Witness, "As women of the hip-hop generation we need a feminist consciousness that allows us to examine how representations and images can be simultaneously empowering and problematic."

Many female rappers, such as Queen Latifah, embody and convey feminism, yet she does not identify as a feminist because "it is considered too white, too middle class, and too hostile to black men. Some writers locate Latifah's story in "Third Wave" feminism, as representing a race-conscious, sexually open feminism that rejects Second Wave white feminist elitism and racism, and also black sexism and homophobia".

The Second wave of feminism unfolded in the context of the anti-war and civil rights movements due to the growing self-consciousness of minority groups around the world. As many women and men involved in hip hop culture are not white, they will have a different way of viewing the world; a desire for intersectional change in the spheres of how both women and non-white people are treated in America.

== Feminism in hip hop music ==
In the world of hip-hop feminism, women are the catalyst. In 1992, R&B singer Mary J. Blige released What's the 411? on Uptown/MCA Records and was considered the pioneer of hip-hop feminism. Female MC's and singers would base tracks based on the advancement of women. One such example is "Ladies First", a track by Queen Latifah and Monie Love on Latifah's debut album, All Hail the Queen. Women such as MC Missy Elliott and Queen Latifah followed suit. In 1995, Queen Latifah broke the glass ceiling of black women in hip-hop by winning a Grammy for her song "U.N.I.T.Y.," which revolutionized hip-hop feminism's ideal of sexual empowerment and the autonomy and ownership of the female black body.

Behind Queen Latifah came hip-hop and R&B artist Lauryn Hill, who became the best example of hip-hop feminism with record-breaking worldwide sales of her album The Miseducation of Lauryn Hill and by winning five Grammy awards in 1998, including Album of the Year (Hobson and Bartlow, 5). Female emcees sometimes mimicked the hip hop rhetoric of males in the scene and generated a massive amount of attention. Missy Elliott was often seen dressed similarly to male hip-hop artists and utilized the same body language and aggressive delivery of her lyrics as a means of protest while still preserving her femininity.

The 1990s saw a wave of feminist lyrics in hip-hop that empowered women in different ways. One group that featured some feminist lyrics was the Beastie Boys: in its song "Sure Shot," the group gives a shout-out to women, offering respect that it claims is long overdue. 2Pac also offered some input regarding why women are belittled and treated differently when they are the ones that make life possible in his song “Keep Ya Head Up.” "I wonder why we take from our women, why we rape our women, do we hate our women? I think it’s time that we kill for our women, time to heal our women, be real to our women.” These lyrics uplifted women in a genre dominated by men.

He displayed his feminism through his music also with Dear Mama. A few other artists in the feminist wave include Lauryn Hill, Salt-n-Pepa, and Black Star. Other artists that have also had some inspirational feminist lyrics include J. Cole. With his song "Crooked Smile," he not only asserts that women should love everything about themselves but also points out that being insecure is a "gender neutral" experience that everyone in the world goes through.

Another major artist from the ’90s who brought some empowering lyrics to women is Missy Elliott with her song "WTF (Where They From)." She had made her stances clear that all women deserve to be treated equally to men and are as powerful as men. She believes that women with opinions should be praised and that they are valuable to society. She also promotes self-love and being able to express what you want and love whoever you want, as well as encouraging women to express themselves in many ways including fashion. According to Katherine Cheairs, these artists were connecting the link between hip-hop music and the feminist movement.

In the 21st century, hip-hop feminists have moved past the male rhetoric and doused the genre in feminine style. For example, many modern hip-hop feminists utilize their voluptuous figures in a commanding manner rather than adopting male rapper outfitting and lyric style. Aisha Durham writes that hip-hop aided in creating a style icon out of the female black body. Additionally, Nicki Minaj utilizes the female black body as a power symbol. In fact, in the 2011 issue of Ebony magazine, Minaj asserted her place in the hip-hop world, affirming that she can stand on her own in the male-dominated genre and use her body in an empowering manner rather than an oppressive one.

Nicki Minaj is a very prominent figure in feminism in Hip hop music. She symbolizes the shifts within Hip hop that have occurred over the past two decades, including a "narrowing of the representations of blackness in hip hop, hip-hop’s move toward consumption and merchandising, and the rapid disappearance of female rappers and the dramatic increase voiceless female video dancers". Rihanna is another mainstream hip-hop feminist. In her most recent album "Anti," her lyrics assert black female independence. Given Rihanna's past, the hip-hop feminist scene looked to her as a role model to stand up for domestic violence against the black female body.

Feminist activism has also occurred as a reaction against misogynist hip-hop songs. At Spelman College, female students protested a benefit hosted at the school by Nelly. They specifically objected to his 2000 single, "Tip Drill". The video depicts Nelly throwing money on the models, as well women in bikinis dancing around Nelly and other men. Students, led by the Spelman Feminist Majority Leadership Alliance spearheaded protests against Nelly's visit. Due to the actions of the student body, the drive was ultimately canceled.

Many contend that the emergence of female hip hop artists who utilize their sexuality are part of third-wave feminism. Nicki Minaj, a female rapper, was considered controversial for the cover of her single Anaconda in which the parental-advisory sticker is placed over Minaj in a bikini.

More recently, rapper's such as Cardi B have sought to be considered modern day feminist icons due to liberating their sexuality and embracing promiscuity to their full advantage instead of benefiting the dominated male industry. In her interview with Billboard Magazine, Cardi states 'Being a feminist is such a great thing and some people feel like someone like me can't be as great as that. Being a feminist is real simple; it's that a woman can do things the same as a man."

Feminist media activist Jamia Wilson says, "I think that it's just hard for people to really grasp what it's like to be extremely powerful but also vulnerable. Black women, in particular, are characterized as singularly strong figures. How can you be the mule of the world for everybody, but also have somebody carry you when you need them to?"

Chance The Rapper has also contributed positive lyrics in some of his songs that complement a black feminist perspective. In 2016, Chance The Rapper released the mixtape "Coloring Book" which won a grammy in 2017. This mixtape included a track called "All We Got" which featured a feminist perspective. In this song, he says “Man my daughter couldn't have a better mother, If she ever find another, he better love her.” This shows how Chance The Rapper is allowing the mother of his daughter to move on and have a great life without him in it. He is giving her independence and wishing her well, which is positive unpopular message in the hip-hop industry relating to women and feminism.

== Graffiti ==
Feminist activism in the graffiti subculture manifests itself through the artwork, as anonymity is a large part of the culture. Often, artists' identities are kept secret, and little can be used to distinguish them as women. Some writers will utilize traditionally feminism symbols, such as hearts, in their name tags, while others will focus their subject around women and femininity. Graffiti writers will teach and practice their artworks on walls that were specifically claimed for graffiti by service-based organizations. They also practice their graffiti on canvases made from nailed-together wooden planks in order to decrease gang activity, and promote legal graffiti areas.

All female graffiti crews are common, such as Few and Far (U.S.) and Girls on Top (U.K.). With the dispersion of the culture through the Internet, these groups can also be internationally based such as the Stick Up Girlz (members in the U.S. and Japan), Maripussy Crew (members in Peru and the U.S.) and Ladies Destroying Crew (members in Nicaragua and Costa Rica).

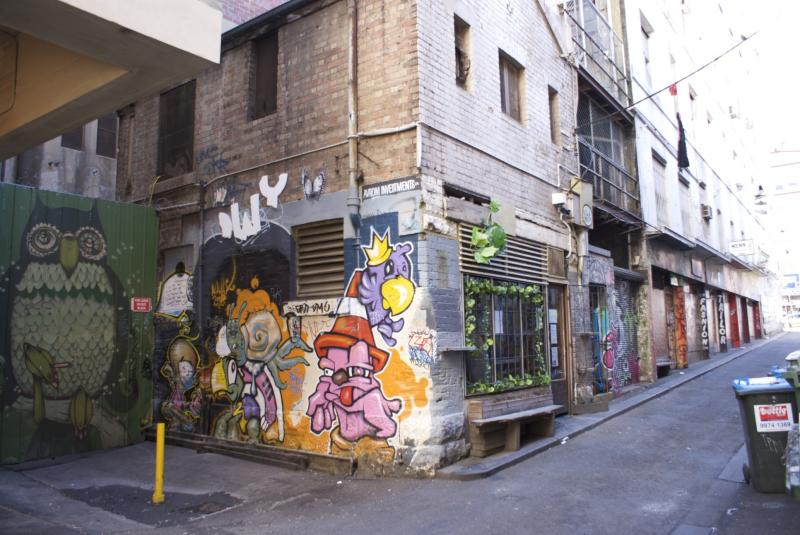
Graffiti in an alley

The largest female street art event, Femme Fierce. occurs annually in the United Kingdom. It is considered part of International Women's Day. The Danish documentary, Women on Walls was released in 2014 in conjunction with the annual event. It follows a number of female graffiti artists participating in the event. It includes interviews with graffiti artists and the behind-the-scenes coordinators of Femme Fierce.

Notable female graffiti writers include Akit, Sasu, Claw, and Lady Pink. Many tag in public places, but are also featured in exhibits in galleries and museums. The Whitney Museum, the Metropolitan Museum of Art and the Woodward Gallery have all featured art pieces from female writers.

== Breakdancing ==
Breakdancing has been a predominantly male genre of dance, even referred to originally as b-boying. Women often refer to themselves as b-girls to differentiate themselves, or simply call themselves breakdancers. There are many stereotypes against female breakdancers. The most common is that they are unable to do the heavily athletic moves as well as men can. Some believe B-boying is considered to involve dance moves that are too masculine for women. Women are often singled out in cyphers and compete in predominately male arenas. This is referenced in the article, "From Blues Women to B-Girls, Performing Badass Femininity," by Imani K Johnson. Johnson writes:

The confrontational and aggressive qualities of breaking are more aligned with conventional notions of masculinity than femininity in Western culture. That breaking adopts a male-identified moniker - b-boying- attests to why it is primarily characterized as a masculine dance by its practitioners. Breaking's inherent qualities are often interpreted differently on the bodies of women. It is clear that being a b-girl means exhibiting qualities not typically associated with conventional notions of femininity as performed by a female-bodied person.

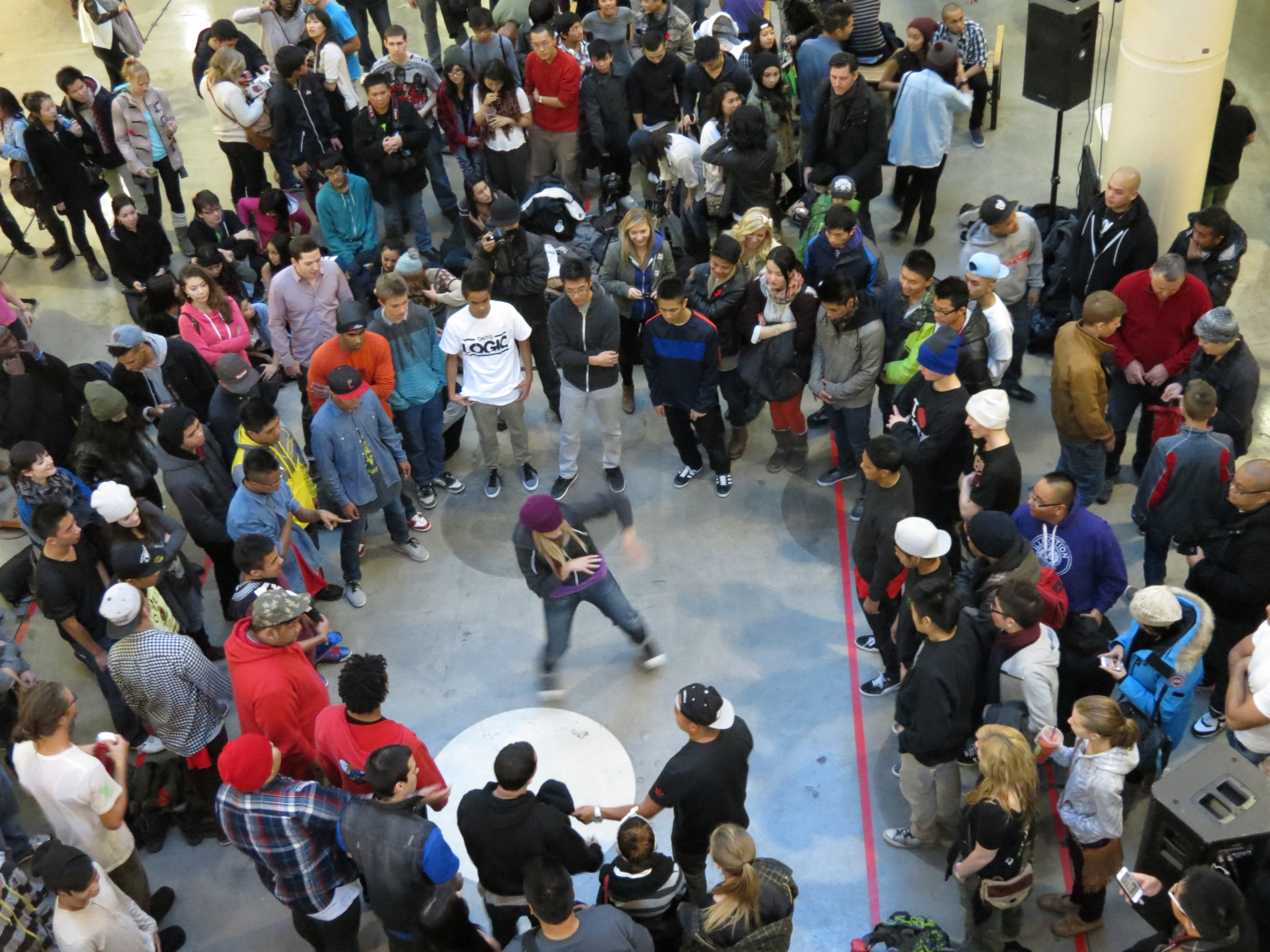
Women breakdancing for a crowd

Break-dancing was usually practiced in areas that weren't inhabited and areas that were free. These practice areas included, but weren't limited to "churches, community centers, school gymnasiums, and when the weather is nice in parks, on beaches, or on the street."

Yet dance can quite literally move us to recognize that which is beyond the familiar and expected. B-girls contend with dominant discourses in order to embody non-hegemonic, marginalized femininities. However, some have overcome these barriers to become respected dancers in their field, such as Ana 'Rokafella' Garcia, who runs a not-for-profit organization called Full Circle. It is designed to introduce young students to the hip hop culture, especially breakdancing.

In 2015, the Red Bull BC One cypher, an international breakdancing competition, was won by 18-year-old B-girl Queen Mary.

== See also ==
- LGBTQ representations in hip hop music
