= Obongjayar =

Nigerian Afrobeat singer

- Born: Steven Umoh; October 16, 1992 (age 33); Calabar, Nigeria
- Genres: Afrobeat; spoken word
- Occupation: Singer
- Label: September Recordings

Steven Umoh, better known by his stage name Obongjayar, is a Nigerian singer based in London, England. After releasing several EPs, his debut studio album, Some Nights I Dream of Doors, was released in 2022, followed by Paradise Now in 2025.

== Early life ==
Steven Umoh grew up in Calabar, Nigeria. He was raised by his grandmother; his mother had moved to the UK to escape Umoh's father, who was abusive. Early in his life, Umoh primarily listened to bootleg rap, particularly Eminem, Usher, Nelly, Snoop Dogg and Ciara.

Umoh moved to live with his mother in England at the age of 17, but stayed active in the Nigerian music scene. He grew up a devoutly religious Christian, but became less so after he attended university in Norwich. In college, he sang primarily in an American accent, influenced by his childhood spent listening to American hip hop music, but he reverted to singing in his natural Nigerian-British accent before embarking on his professional career.

== Career ==
Obongjayar started his career publishing his music on SoundCloud. His work caught the notice of XL Recordings executive Richard Russell, who then asked Obongjayar to contribute to his Everything Is Recorded project. In 2016, Obongjayar released his first extended play, Home, described by Noisey as "a unique voice: one that navigates darkness with nocturnal, near-spiritual hymns."

He followed Home with a second EP, Bassey, which was noted for its sparse production and afrobeat rhythms, as well as its themes of spirituality, politics, and his experiences as a Black person. He also contributed to Richard Russell's 2017 EP, Close But Not Quite.

In 2019, Obongjayar featured on rapper Danny Brown's fifth studio album U Know What I'm Sayin? on the tracks "Belly of the Beast" and "uknowhatimsayin¿".

In collaboration with afrobeat producer Sarz, Obongjayar released a third EP, Sweetness, in 2021. He featured on rapper Little Simz's studio album Sometimes I Might Be Introvert on the fourth single "Point and Kill", which was later accompanied by a music video. Obongjayar also released the song and music video "Message in a Hammer", the lead single for his debut album. Some Nights I Dream of Doors was released in May 2022 and was later nominated for the Best Album Ivor Novello Award on 18 May 2023.

In 2023, Obongjayar collaborated with Fred Again on the single "Adore U". The song was certified platinum in Australia and in the UK.

== Style ==
Obongjayar's music has been called "hard to describe,” incorporating elements of Indie electronic, spoken word, soul, and electronic music. His lyrics incorporate spiritual overtones, although they are not readily identifiable with any specific religious tradition. A unifying feature of all of Obongjayar's music is his unique voice, which slides between rapping, singing, and spoken word.

== Discography ==
=== Studio albums ===
List of studio albums, with selected chart positions, showing relevant details
| Title | Album details | Peak chart positions |
| Title | Album details | UK |
|---|---|---|
| Some Nights I Dream of Doors | Released: 13 May 2022; Label: September Recordings; Format: CD, LP, digital download, streaming | — |
| Paradise Now | Released: 30 May 2025; Label: September Recordings; Format: CD, LP, digital download, streaming | — |

=== Extended plays ===
List of extended plays, showing relevant details
| Title | Details |
|---|---|
| Bassey | Release: 25 August 2017; Label: Self-released; Format: Digital download, streaming |
| Which Way Is Forward | Release: 7 February 2020; Label: September Recordings; Format: Digital download, streaming |
| Sweetness (with Sarz) | Release: 23 July 2021; Label: Metallic Music/1789; Format: Digital download, streaming |

- Home (2016)

=== Singles ===
==== As lead artist ====
List of singles, with selected chart positions and certifications, showing year released and album name
| Title | Year | Peak chart positions | Certifications | Album |
| Title | Year | UK | Certifications | Album |
|---|---|---|---|---|
| "Adore U" (with Fred Again) | 2023 | 4 | BPI: Platinum | Ten Days |
| "Just My Luck" / "Tomorrow Man" | 2024 | — | | Paradise Now |
| "Not In Surrender" | 2025 | — | | Paradise Now |
| "Jellyfish" | 2025 | — | | Paradise Now |
"—" denotes release did not chart in that territory.

==== As a featured artist ====
List of singles as a featured artist, showing year released and album name
| Title | Year | Album |
|---|---|---|
| "Poison" (Octavian featuring Take a Daytrip, Obongjayar & Santi) | 2020 | Non-album single |
| "Point and Kill" (Little Simz featuring Obongjayar) | 2021 | Sometimes I Might Be Introvert |
| "Flood" (Little Simz featuring Obongjayar & Moonchild Sanelly) | 2025 | Lotus |

=== Guest appearances ===
List of non-single guest appearances, showing year released and album name
| Title | Year | Other artists | Album |
|---|---|---|---|
| "Belly of the Beast" | 2019 | Danny Brown | UKnoWhatImSayin? |
| "Gasoline" | 2025 | None | F1 the Album |
| "Love Me" | 2026 | Dahi | Black Boy (Alternative) |
