= Little Simz =

British rapper (born 1994)

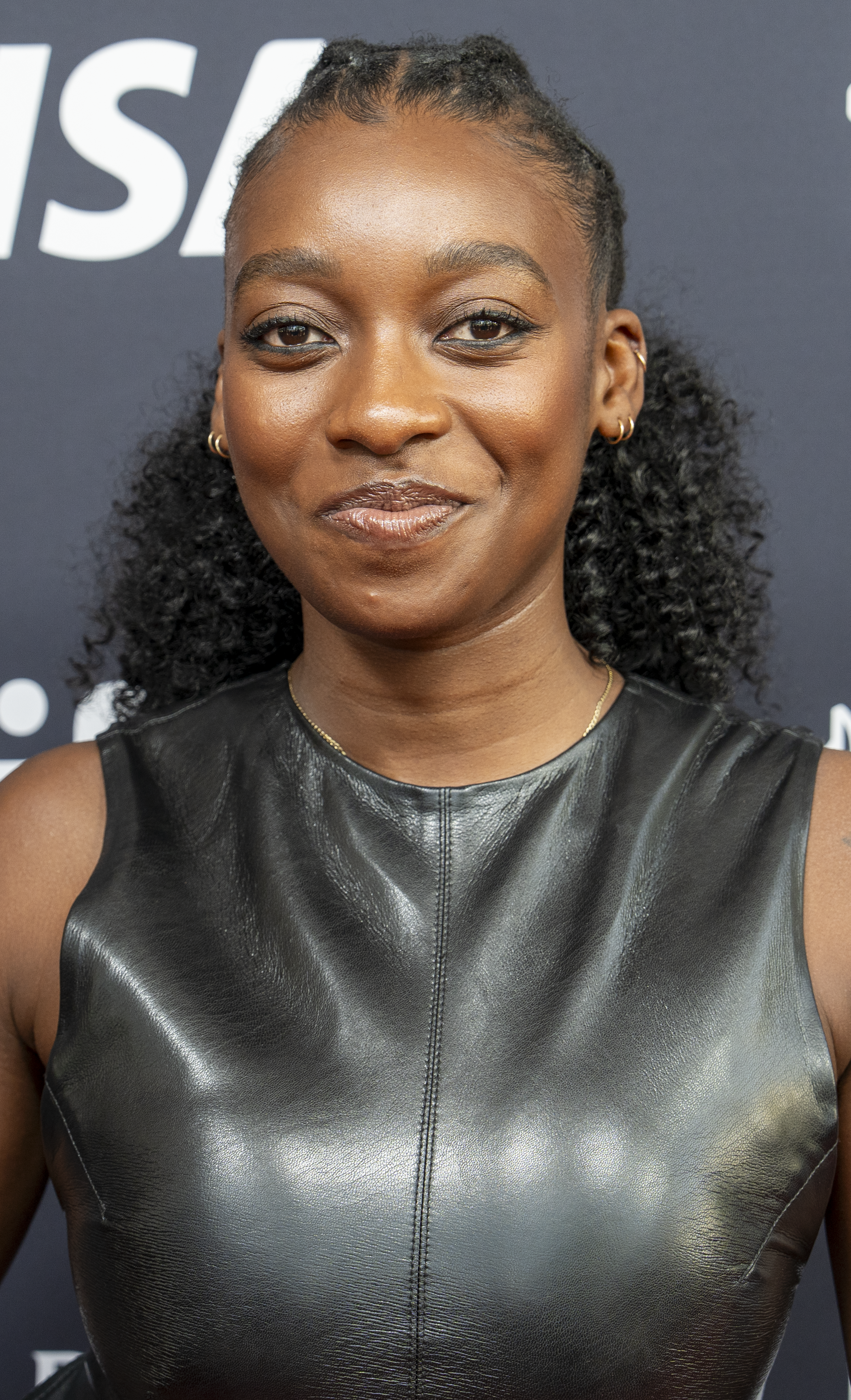
- Simz at the 2025 Toronto International Film Festival

Background information
- Also known as: Simbi, Simz
- Born: Simbiatu Abisola Abiola Ajikawo; 23 February 1994 (age 32); Islington, London, England
- Genre: British hip-hop
- Occupations: Rapper; songwriter; actress
- Years active: 2010–present
- Labels: Age 101 Music; AWAL
- Website: littlesimz.com

Simbiatu "Simbi" Abisola Abiola Ajikawo (born 23 February 1994), better known by her stage name Little Simz, is an English rapper and actress. She rose to prominence with the independent release of her first three albums: A Curious Tale of Trials + Persons (2015), Stillness in Wonderland (2016) and Grey Area (2019), the last of which was shortlisted for the Mercury Prize and won the awards for Best Album at both the Ivor Novello Awards and the NME Awards.

Her fourth album, Sometimes I Might Be Introvert (2021), received widespread critical acclaim, with several publications deeming it the best album of 2021. It won the 2022 Mercury Prize, and earned her the 2022 Brit Award for Best New Artist and the Libera Award for Best Hip-Hop/Rap Record. Her fifth album, No Thank You (2022), was released to critical acclaim. In 2024, she was featured on the single "We Pray" by Coldplay, alongside Burna Boy, Elyanna, and Tini. Her sixth studio album, Lotus, was released on 6 June 2025.

Outside of music, Ajikawo has starred in the Netflix revival drama series Top Boy. She also appeared as herself in the film Venom: Let There Be Carnage (2021).

== Early life ==
Ajikawo was born in Islington, London, to Nigerian parents. She was raised on a council estate with two older sisters. Her mother was also a foster carer during her childhood. She is ethnically Yoruba.

She studied at Highbury Fields School in London and also attended St Mary's Youth Club in Upper Street, Islington, with pop stars Leona Lewis and Alexandra Burke. Ajikawo has credited Mary's Youth Club for its influence on her career, describing it as "the place where it all began for me … a second home".

Ajikawo later studied at Westminster Kingsway College and The University of West London where she pursued her music career.

== Music career ==
=== 2015–2017: Career beginnings and A Curious Tale of Trials + Persons and Stillness in Wonderland ===
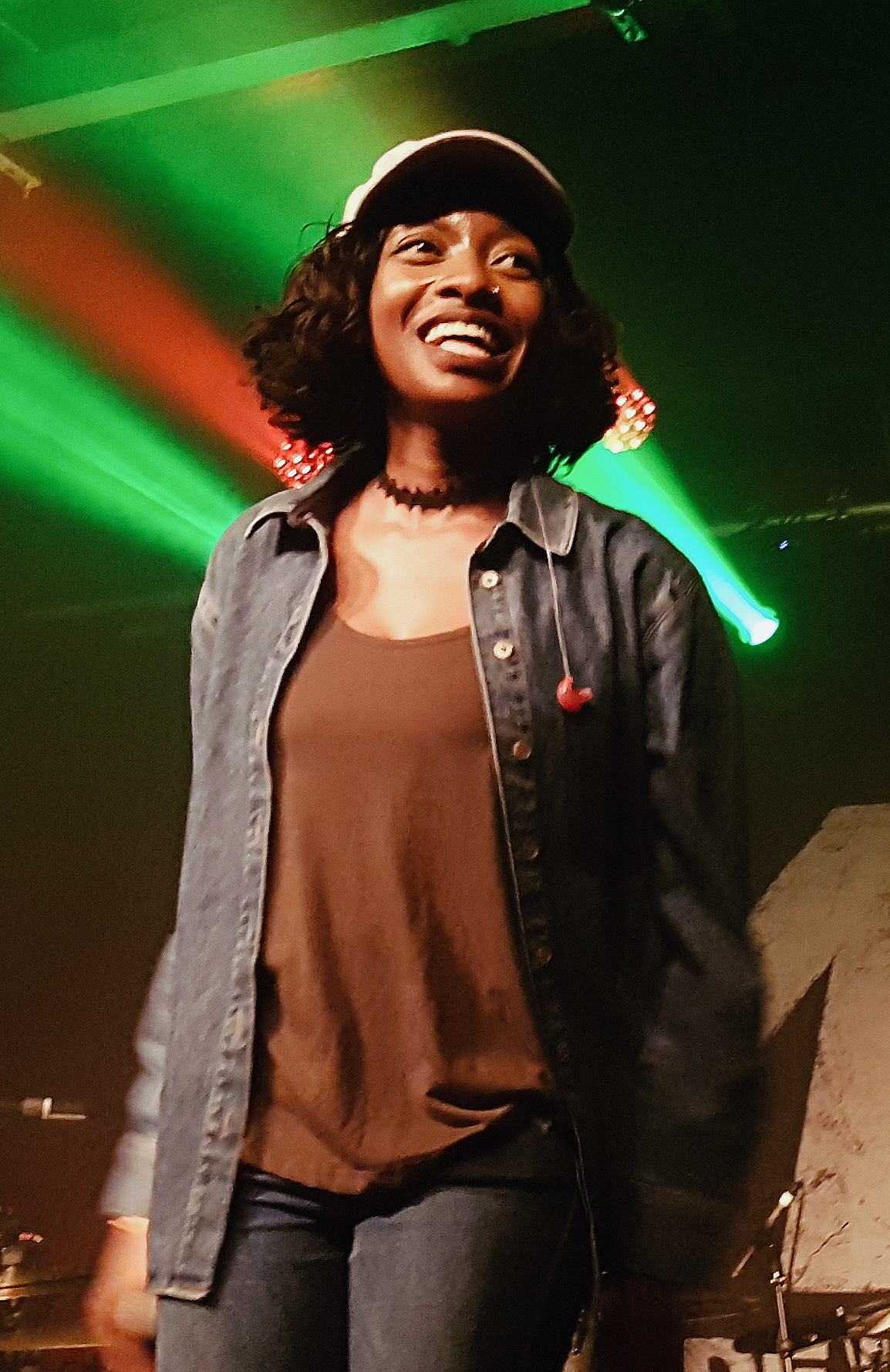
Little Simz in 2016

Ajikawo has performed at Rising Tide, iluvlive, Industry Takeover (Urban Development) Hackney Empire, Somerset House and the House of Lords. She also performed at the BBC 1Xtra Prom 2015 at the Royal Albert Hall, alongside a full orchestra led by Jules Buckley. Ajikawo can be heard on the Leave to Remain film soundtrack, performing the song "Leave It As That". In early 2013, she appeared on BBC Radio 1Xtra to discuss her performance at the Hackney Weekend. Ajikawo went on to do a Maida Vale session for Huw Stephens. She released her debut studio album, A Curious Tale of Trials + Persons, on 18 September 2015.

She was given the opportunity to tour with Nas, Lauryn Hill, and Kehlani in 2016. In April 2016, Little Simz became the first UK rapper to be named to Forbes’ 30 Under 30 Europe list. She subsequently participated in the Forbes Under 30 Summit EMEA in Jerusalem and performed at the Israel Museum. On 12 December 2016, Little Simz released the lead single to her upcoming album, "Poison Ivy". Just two days later, Simz released the album's second single, "Picture Perfect". On 16 December 2016, Simz released her sophomore full-length studio album, Stillness in Wonderland, alongside its comic-book companion, Welcome to Wonderland.

In 2017, she performed as the opening act for Gorillaz during their Humanz Tour, and was the vocalist for the song "Garage Palace", featured on the Super Deluxe edition of their album Humanz. On 11 May 2017, Simz released "Backseat". On 11 October 2017, she released "Good For What", before releasing the deluxe edition to her aforementioned album on 3 November 2017.

=== 2018–2021: Grey Area, Drop 6 and Sometimes I Might Be Introvert ===
Ajikawo releases her music on her own Age 101 Music record label with an exclusive distribution licensing arrangement with AWAL Recordings. On 6 September 2018, Ajikawo and her label AGE 101 signed a worldwide deal with AWAL Recordings, after AWAL had distributed her debut album "A Curious Tale of Trials + Persons" in 2015. This deal was renewed on 18 June 2020.

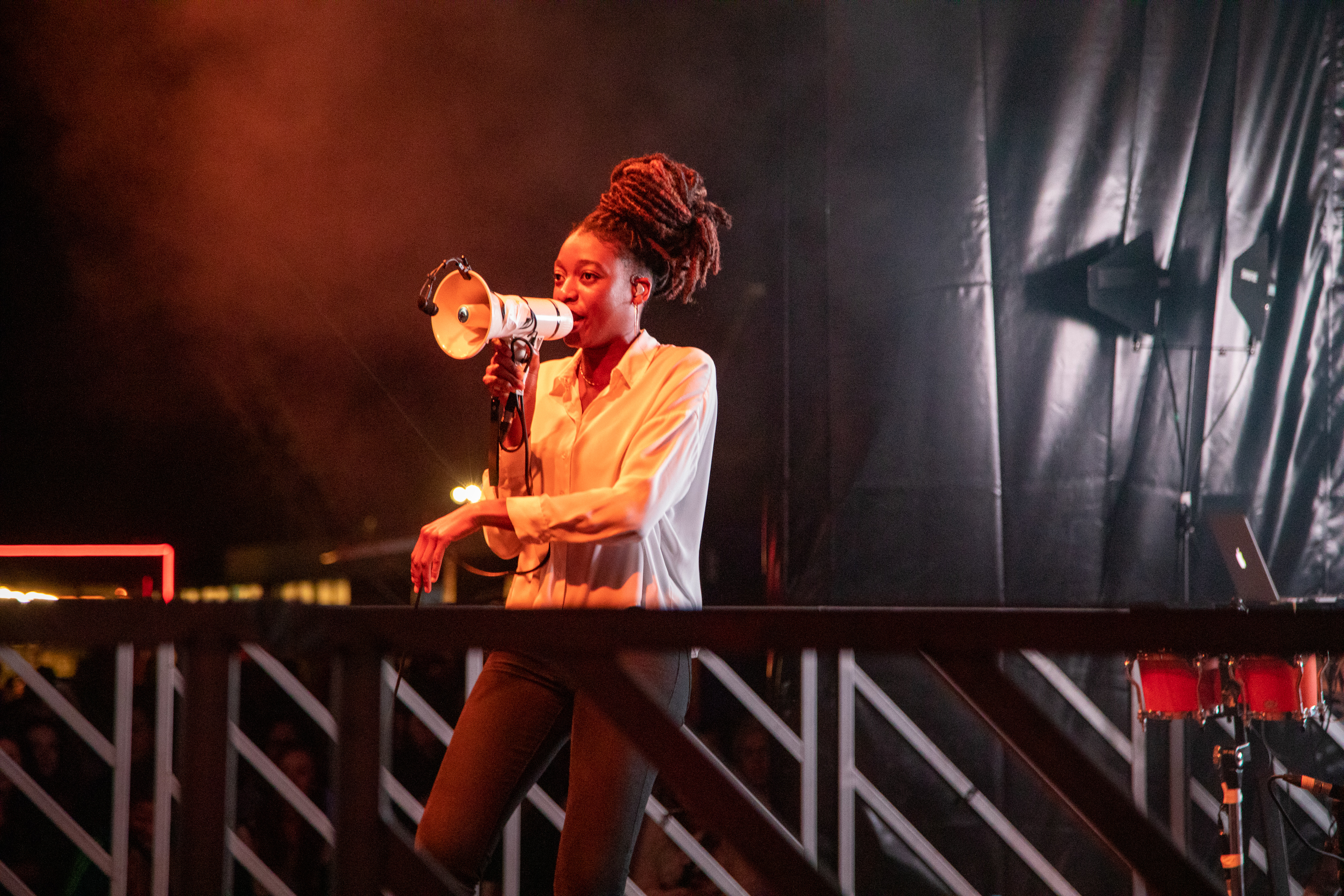
Little Simz at Primavera Sound 2019

On 17 September 2018, Simz released "Offence" as the lead single to her upcoming studio album, Grey Area. The album's second single, "Boss" was released on 23 September 2018. The album's third single, "101 FM" was released on 4 December 2018. The album's final single, assisted by Cleo Sol, was released on 16 January 2019, alongside the album's announcement. Grey Area was released to critical success and was nominated for the Mercury Prize, and IMPALA's European Independent Album of the Year Award (2019). On 6 May 2020, while in quarantine, Simz released her tenth extended play, Drop 6.

Simz announced the title, cover, release date, and pre-order for her fourth full-length studio album, Sometimes I Might Be Introvert on 21 April 2021. The album's lead single, "Introvert" was released alongside the announcement. The album's second single, "Woman", assisted by Cleo Sol, was released on 6 May 2021. The album's third single, "Rollin Stone" was released on 14 June 2021. The album's fourth single, "I Love You, I Hate You" was released on 8 July 2021. The album's fifth and final single, "Point and Kill" was released on 1 September 2021, just two days prior to the release of the album. On 3 September 2021, she released her fourth studio album, Sometimes I Might Be Introvert debuting at number 4 on the UK album charts and winning BBC 6's Album of the Year. The album would also give Simz her first Mercury Prize win in October 2022.

=== 2022–present: No Thank You, Drop 7 and Lotus ===
On 6 December 2022, Ajikawo announced her fifth studio album, No Thank You. Once again produced by Inflo, the album found her speaking out about the rap industry on songs such as "X" while exploring themes of mental health in Black communities on songs such as "Broken". The album was released on 12 December 2022 and was well received.

Ajikawo performed her song "Heart On Fire" with Joan Armatrading during the 76th British Academy Film Awards ceremony, held on 19 February 2023.

In February 2024, Ajikawo announced Drop 7, her 11th extended play. The project saw a shift to an electronic dance sound and was released on 9 February 2024.

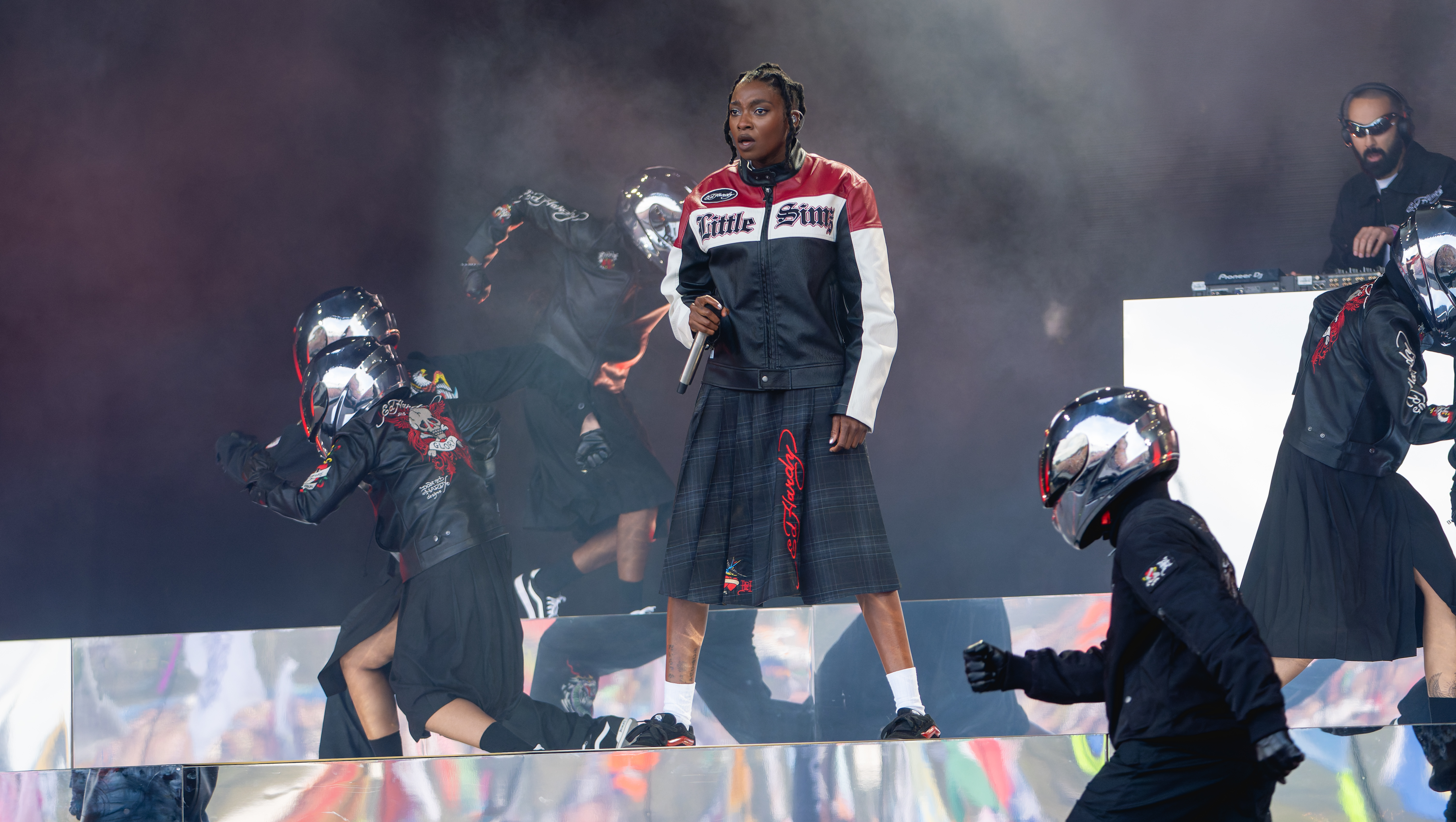
Little Simz performing at Glastonbury Festival in 2024

At 2024's Glastonbury, on the night of Saturday 29 June 2024, she performed the penultimate act on the Pyramid Stage. Her performance received rave reviews. On the same day, she was invited by British rock band Coldplay to perform the song "We Pray". The single was released on 12 August 2024, featuring Burna Boy, Elyanna and Tini, and is part of Coldplay's studio album Moon Music.

On 26 February 2025, Ajikawo announced her sixth studio album, Lotus, which was slated for release on 9 May 2025. She delayed the album to 6 June 2025 due to scheduling conflicts with a film.

Ajikawo's extended play Sugar Girl released on 8 May 2026.

== Acting career ==
Ajikawo's acting career began with the role of Vicky in the BBC children's series Spirit Warriors, originally broadcast in 2010, and as Meleka in the E4 television series Youngers. She was narrator for the television series Afrofuturism, and played Shelley in Netflix's revival of Top Boy, which premiered in autumn 2019. She appeared as herself in the Sony's Spider-Man Universe film Venom: Let There Be Carnage, singing her song "Venom" in a nightclub rave, which Venom goes to after his split from Eddie Brock. In 2025, she played Shola, a young teacher in Steve, the movie adaptation of the novel Shy by Max Porter, opposite Cillian Murphy in the lead role.

== Artistry ==
She describes her music as rap and experimental. Whilst she is closely affiliated with the grime genre, she has also pulled inspiration from other genres including reggae, blues, synth-rock and jazzy R&B.

Ajikawo grew up listening to rap artists Busta Rhymes, Nas and Biggie Smalls, which influenced her to pursue a rap career. Lauryn Hill has often been cited as one of her biggest influences. Ajikawo stated "I think The Miseducation of Lauryn Hill was really my education. Lauryn Hill was one of the first artists that really made me feel the power of music." She also drew inspiration from jazz musicians Nina Simone, John Coltrane and Billie Holiday for her album Sometimes I Might Be Introvert. Other inspirations include her idol Kendrick Lamar, who called her "the illest doing it right now" in 2015.

Ajikawo met producer Inflo of the R&B band Sault at a youth center, and he would produce three of her albums including Sometimes I Might Be Introvert. A financial conflict with Inflo caused Ajikawo to part ways with him and have Miles Clinton James (known for producing Kokoroko) produce her sixth album Lotus instead.

== Endorsements ==
In July 2026, Ajikawo was named the UK beauty ambassador for Miu Miu Beauty and debuted as the face of the brand's Fleur de Lait fragrance campaign.

== Personal life ==
Ajikawo lives in London. She is a childhood friend of actor Fady Elsayed and actress Letitia Wright. Ajikawo and Wright have remained good friends and Ajikawo photographed Wright for the artwork for her single "Selfish" in 2019. Whilst Ajikawo believes in God, she does not currently follow any religion.

Ajikawo is a fan of Arsenal F.C.

In 2018 her friend, model Harry Uzoka, was murdered, inspiring her to write her song "Wounds".

== Discography ==
Studio albums

- A Curious Tale of Trials + Persons (2015)
- Stillness in Wonderland (2016)
- Grey Area (2019)
- Sometimes I Might Be Introvert (2021)
- No Thank You (2022)
- Lotus (2025)

== Tours ==
- Age101 Drop the World (2015)
- Welcome to Wonderland (2017–2018)
- Grey Area Tour (2019)
- Sometimes I Might Be Introvert (2021)
- No Thank You (2023)
- Lotus (2025)

== Filmography ==
Year	Title	Role	Notes
2010	Spirit Warriors	Vicky	BBC series
2012	Ill Manors	Youth Suspect at the Railway Station (Lil Simz)	
2013	Youngers	Meleka	E4 series
2019–2023	Top Boy	Shelley	Netflix series
2021	Venom: Let There Be Carnage	Herself	Cameo
2023	The Power	Adunola	Recurring role
2024	RM: Right People, Wrong Place	Herself	Documentary film
2025	Steve	Shola	
2027	Clutch †	Cass Martial	Video game

== Awards and nominations ==
Award	Year	Category	Nominated work	Result	Ref.
AIM Independent Music Awards	2016	Independent Album of the Year	A Curious Tale of Trials + Persons	Won	
AIM Independent Music Awards	2017	Best Second Album	Stillness in Wonderland	Nominated	
AIM Independent Music Awards	2017	Hardest Working Band or Artist	Herself	Nominated	
AIM Independent Music Awards	2019	Best Independent Track	"Selfish"	Nominated	
AIM Independent Music Awards	2019	Best Independent Album	Grey Area	Nominated	
AIM Independent Music Awards	2019	Pioneer Award	Herself	Won	
AIM Independent Music Awards	2023	Best Independent Album	No Thank You	Nominated	
BBC Radio 1	2021	Hottest Record of the Year	"Introvert"	Nominated	
Berlin Music Video Awards	2022	Best Art Director	"Woman"	Nominated	
Berlin Music Video Awards	2025	Best Director	"Flood"	Nominated	
BET Awards	2022	Best International Act	Herself	Nominated	
BET Hip Hop Awards	2021	Best International Flow	Herself	Won	
Brit Awards	2022	British Artist of the Year	Herself	Nominated	
Brit Awards	2022	Best New Artist	Herself	Won	
Brit Awards	2022	Best Hip Hop/Rap/Grime Act	Herself	Nominated	
Brit Awards	2022	British Album of the Year	Sometimes I Might Be Introvert	Nominated	
Brit Awards	2024	British Album of the Year	No Thank You	Nominated	
Brit Awards	2024	British Artist of the Year	Herself	Nominated	
Brit Awards	2024	Best Hip Hop/Grime/Rap Act	Herself	Nominated	
Hollywood Independent Music Awards	2024	Adult Contemporary Hip Hop	"Gorilla"	Nominated	
IMPALA Awards	2019	Album of the Year	Grey Area	Nominated	
Ivor Novello Awards	2020	Best Album	Grey Area	Won	
Ivor Novello Awards	2022	Best Album	Sometimes I Might Be Introvert	Nominated	
Ivor Novello Awards	2022	Best Contemporary Song	"I Love You, I Hate You"	Won	
Ivor Novello Awards	2023	Best Album	No Thank You	Nominated	
Libera Awards	2021	Best Hip-Hop/Rap Record	Drop 6	Nominated	
Libera Awards	2022	Best Hip-Hop/Rap Record	Sometimes I Might Be Introvert	Won	
Mercury Prize	2019	Album of the Year	Grey Area	Nominated	
Mercury Prize	2022	Album of the Year	Sometimes I Might Be Introvert	Won	
MOBO Awards	2017	Best Female Act	Herself	Nominated	
MOBO Awards	2017	Best Hip Hop Act	Herself	Nominated	
MOBO Awards	2020	Best Album (2017–2019)	Grey Area	Nominated	
MOBO Awards	2021	Best Female Act	Herself	Won	
MOBO Awards	2021	Best Hip Hop Act	Herself	Nominated	
MOBO Awards	2021	Video of the Year	"Woman"	Nominated	
MOBO Awards	2022	Album of the Year	Sometimes I Might Be Introvert	Won	
MOBO Awards	2022	Best Female Act	Herself	Nominated	
MOBO Awards	2022	Best Hip-Hop Act	Herself	Nominated	
MOBO Awards	2022	Video of the Year	"Point and Kill" (featuring Obongjayar)	Nominated	
MOBO Awards	2023	Album of the Year	No Thank You	Nominated	
MOBO Awards	2023	Best Female Act	Herself	Nominated	
MOBO Awards	2023	Best Hip Hop Act	Herself	Won	
MOBO Awards	2023	Video of the Year	"Gorilla"	Nominated	
MTV Europe Music Awards	2023	Best Video	"Gorilla"	Nominated	
NME Awards	2020	Best British Album	Grey Area	Won	
NME Awards	2020	Best Album in the World	Grey Area	Nominated	
NME Awards	2022	Best Album in the World	Sometimes I Might Be Introvert	Nominated	
NME Awards	2022	Best Album by a UK Artist	Sometimes I Might Be Introvert	Nominated	
NME Awards	2022	Best Solo Act in the World	Herself	Nominated	
NME Awards	2022	Best Solo Act from the UK	Herself	Won	
NME Awards	2022	Best Live Act	Herself	Nominated	
South African Hip Hop Awards	2021	Best International Act	Herself	Nominated	
UK Music Video Awards	2018	Best Dance Video - UK	"Garage Palace" (with Gorillaz)	Nominated	
UK Music Video Awards	2021	Best Hip Hop / Grime / Rap Video - UK	"Introvert"	Nominated	
UK Music Video Awards	2021	Best Editing in a Video	"Introvert"	Won	
UK Music Video Awards	2021	Best Choreography in a Video	"Introvert"	Nominated	
UK Music Video Awards	2021	Best Wardrobe Styling in a Video	"Woman"	Nominated	
UK Music Video Awards	2021	Best Hair & Make-up in a Video	"Woman"	Nominated	
UK Music Video Awards	2022	Best Hip Hop/Grime/Rap Video - UK	"Point and Kill" (featuring Obongjayar)	Won	
UK Music Video Awards	2022	Best Wardrobe Styling in a Video	"Point and Kill" (featuring Obongjayar)	Won	
UK Music Video Awards	2022	Best Hair & Make-up in a Video	"Point and Kill" (featuring Obongjayar)	Nominated	
UK Music Video Awards	2022	Best Cinematography in a Video	"Point and Kill" (featuring Obongjayar)	Nominated	
UK Music Video Awards	2022	Best Color Grading in a Video	"Point and Kill" (featuring Obongjayar)	Won	
UK Music Video Awards	2022	Best Special Video Project	"I Love You, I Hate You"	Nominated	
UK Music Video Awards	2023	Best Hip Hop/Grime/Rap Video - UK	"Gorilla"	Nominated	
UK Music Video Awards	2023	Best Performance in a Video	"Gorilla"	Nominated	
UK Music Video Awards	2023	Best Production Design in a Video	"Gorilla"	Nominated	
UK Music Video Awards	2023	Best Cinematography in a Video	"Gorilla"	Nominated	
UK Music Video Awards	2023	Best Special Video Project	No Thank You	Nominated	
UK Music Video Awards	2025	Best Hip Hop / Grime / Rap Video – UK	"Young"	Nominated	
UK Music Video Awards	2025	Best Hip Hop / Grime / Rap Video – UK	"Flood" (featuring Obongjayar & Moonchild Sanelly)	Nominated	
UK Music Video Awards	2025	Best Performance in a Video	"Flood" (featuring Obongjayar & Moonchild Sanelly)	Nominated	
UK Music Video Awards	2025	Best Cinematography in a Video	"Flood" (featuring Obongjayar & Moonchild Sanelly)	Nominated	
UK Music Video Awards	2025	Best Choreography in a Video	"Flood" (featuring Obongjayar & Moonchild Sanelly)	Nominated	
