= Drop 6 =

EP by Little Simz
- Released: 6 May 2020
- Length: 12:49
- Label: AWAL

Little Simz chronology
Grey Area (2019)	Drop 6 (2020)	Sometimes I Might Be Introvert (2021)

Professional ratings
Aggregate scores
Source	Rating
Metacritic	79/100
Review scores
Source	Rating
Clash	8/10
DIY	4/5 stars
NME	3/5 stars
Pitchfork	7.7/10

Drop 6 is an extended play by British rapper Little Simz. It was released on 6 May 2020 under AWAL.

== Track listing ==
Track listing by Tidal

Drop 6 track listing
No.	Title	Music	Length
1.	"might bang, might not."	Kal Banx; Simbiatu Ajikawo	2:06
2.	"one life, might live."	BLK VYNL; Ajikawo	2:35
3.	"damn right."	Kal Banx; Ajikawo	2:00
4.	"you should call mum"	Declan Gaffney; Ajikawo	2:15
5.	"where's my lighter"	Alewya Demmisse; Ajikawo; Osiris Wilson	3:53
