= Grey Area (album) =

Studio album by Little Simz
- Released: 1 March 2019
- Genre: UK rap
- Length: 35:25
- Label: Age 101; AWAL
- Producer: Inflo; Sigurd; Astronote

Little Simz chronology
Stillness in Wonderland (2016)	Grey Area (2019)	Drop 6 (2020)

Singles from Grey Area
- 1. "Offence" Released: 17 September 2018; 2. "Boss" Released: 23 September 2018; 3. "101 FM" Released: 4 December 2018; 4. "Selfish" Released: 16 January 2019

Grey Area is the third studio album by English rapper Little Simz, released on 1 March 2019 through Age 101 Music and AWAL.

== Release ==
"Offence" was released as a single on 17 September 2018. "Boss" was released as a single on 23 September 2018. "101 FM" was released as a single on 4 December 2018. "Selfish" was released on 16 January 2019 along with the announcement of Grey Area.

== Critical reception ==
Professional ratings
Aggregate scores
Source	Rating
AnyDecentMusic?	8.5/10
Metacritic	91/100
Review scores
Source	Rating
AllMusic	4.5/5 stars
Financial Times	4/5 stars
The Guardian	4/5 stars
The Independent	5/5 stars
NME	5/5 stars
The Observer	4/5 stars
Pitchfork	8.1/10
Q	4/5 stars
The Times	4/5 stars
Vice (Expert Witness)	A−

At Metacritic, which assigns a normalised rating out of 100 to reviews from mainstream publications, the album received an average score of 91, based on 15 reviews, indicating "Universal acclaim".

In the review for AllMusic, Liam Martin praised the album by claiming that "On her third full-length album, Grey Area, Simz has reached a new peak, with an honest record that isn't afraid to take shots at the world at large. It's also incredibly concise -- an aspect that many of her peers often miss the mark on -- with no filler despite the broad variation the record boasts." Kyann-Sian Williams of NME praised the album, giving it a perfect score and saying, "Across these 10 tracks, Simz utilises her most valuable commodity: honesty. Having stripped away the narrative cloak that shrouded the highlights of 'Stillness In Wonderland', she's crafted a knockout record – and finally come true on her early promise. This is the best rap record of the year so far." William Rosebury of The Line of Best Fit said, "It's brave but vulnerable, energetic but reflective and youthful but wise. If you listen to any Little Simz track, you'll know instantly she's a great MC, but with this project she has stepped beyond that to become a uniquely gifted artist. An incredible album."

== Track listing ==
Grey Area
No.	Title	Writer(s)	Producer(s)	Length
1.	"Offence"	Simbiatu Ajikawo; Dean Josiah Cover; Cleopatra Nikolic	Inflo	2:48
2.	"Boss"	Ajikawo; Cover	Inflo	3:05
3.	"Selfish" (featuring Cleo Sol)	Ajikawo; Cover; Nikolic	Inflo	3:46
4.	"Wounds" (featuring Chronixx)	Ajikawo; Cover; Jamar Rolando McNaughton; Miles James	Inflo	4:39
5.	"Venom"	Ajikawo; Charles E. Dickerson; Cover; Stephen Lee Bruner	Inflo	2:34
6.	"101 FM"	Ajikawo; Cover	Inflo	3:11
7.	"Pressure" (featuring Little Dragon)	Ajikawo; Cover; Yukimi Nagano; Erik Bodin; Fredrik Wallin; Håkan Wirenstrand; Sigurd Strumse Lauritzen	Inflo; Sigurd	3:27
8.	"Therapy"	Ajikawo; Cover	Inflo	3:15
9.	"Sherbet Sunset"	Ajikawo; Cover	Inflo	4:55
10.	"Flowers" (featuring Michael Kiwanuka)	Ajikawo; Cover; Mathieu Sandy Rakotozafy; Michael Kiwanuka	Inflo; Astronote	3:45
Total length:				35:25

Japanese bonus track
No.	Title	Length
11.	"She"	3:46

== Charts ==
Chart (2019)	Peak position
Scottish Albums (OCC)	82
UK Albums (OCC)	87
UK Independent Albums (OCC)	11
UK R&B Albums (OCC)	1

== See also ==
- List of UK R&B Albums Chart number ones of 2019
