= Glastonbury Festival 2024 =

Edition of British arts festival

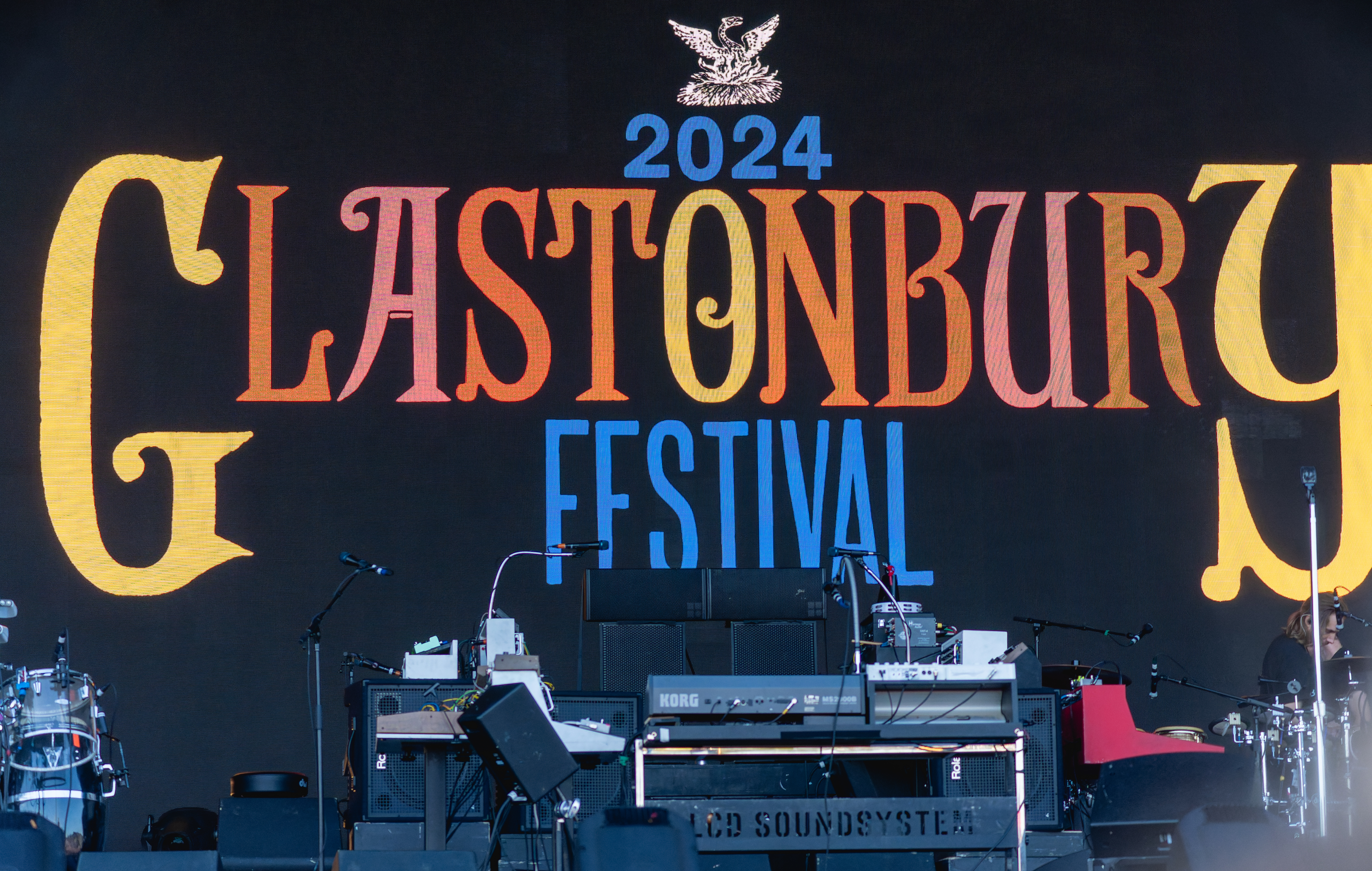
- Date: 26 June 2024 – 30 June 2024
- Locations: Worthy Farm, Pilton, Somerset, England
- Previous event: Glastonbury Festival 2023
- Next event: Glastonbury Festival 2025
- Attendance: 210,000
- Website: glastonburyfestivals.co.uk

The 2024 Glastonbury Festival of Contemporary Performing Arts took place between 26 and 30 June at Worthy Farm in Pilton, Somerset and followed the 2023 edition of the festival. The three headlining acts were Dua Lipa, Coldplay, and SZA, with Shania Twain performing in the traditional Sunday Legends slot.

== Background ==
The first teases of the 2024 line-up came in October 2023 prior to the ticket sale, when festival organizer Emily Eavis confirmed that the Legends slot performer was a female artist, and hinted that there could be two female headliners, after she had initially booked a female artist for the 2023 festival who pulled out and had to be replaced by Guns N' Roses. She reiterated this on 7 March 2024 and teased that the first slate of artists would be released the following week.

An initial wave of performers, including all three headliners, was announced on 14 March 2024, on a poster designed by Stanley Donwood. With their Saturday headlining set, Coldplay become the first act to headline the festival five times, having previously done so in 2002, 2005, 2011, and 2016, while Dua Lipa headlines for the first time after appearing at two previous festivals in 2016 and 2017. American R&B singer-songwriter SZA makes her Glastonbury debut with her headlining slot. Canadian country pop superstar Shania Twain stated that her Legends slot booking “feels like an accolade of sorts, really something that you have to earn – it’s just very rewarding”. The 2024 festival marks the first time in Glastonbury's history that two of the three Pyramid Stage headliners are women, with Lipa posting “I have dreamt of this moment all my life. Something that lived only in my wildest dreams and highest manifestations !!! I am so excited to see you all in my favourite place on earth and make it a night to remember!!” Boy band Seventeen also make history as the first K-pop act to ever perform on the Pyramid Stage.

On 10 April, Lulu announced that she would be performing her final ever concert on the Avalon stage. The lineup for the Acoustic stage was revealed on 12 April 2024.

The full line-up for the 2024 festival was released on 4 June 2024.

== Tickets ==
General admission tickets for the festival went on sale on 19 November 2023. They cost £355 for the full weekend, and sold out within an hour.

== Coverage ==
Over 90 hours of television and radio coverage of the festival was broadcast. The main television coverage was hosted by Jo Whiley, Lauren Laverne, Jack Saunders, and Clara Amfo, with additional online-only coverage from Huw Stephens and Deb Grant, and aired on BBC iPlayer and several BBC channels, including the newly-created "Glastonbury II" channel, in addition to livestreams from each of the five main stages. For the second year in a row, a British Sign Language stream was available for all Pyramid Stage sets. Radio coverage was broadcast on BBC Sounds and all major BBC radio stations, and was preceded by special Glastonbury editions of the Sidetracked podcast hosted by Nick Grimshaw and Annie Mac which featured interviews with Twain, Emily Eavis, and Mike Skinner. Other digital content included special interviews with Coldplay and Dua Lipa discussing their Glastonbury memories, Glastonbury documentaries, and highlights from previous years of the festival.

== Line-up ==
=== Pyramid Stage ===
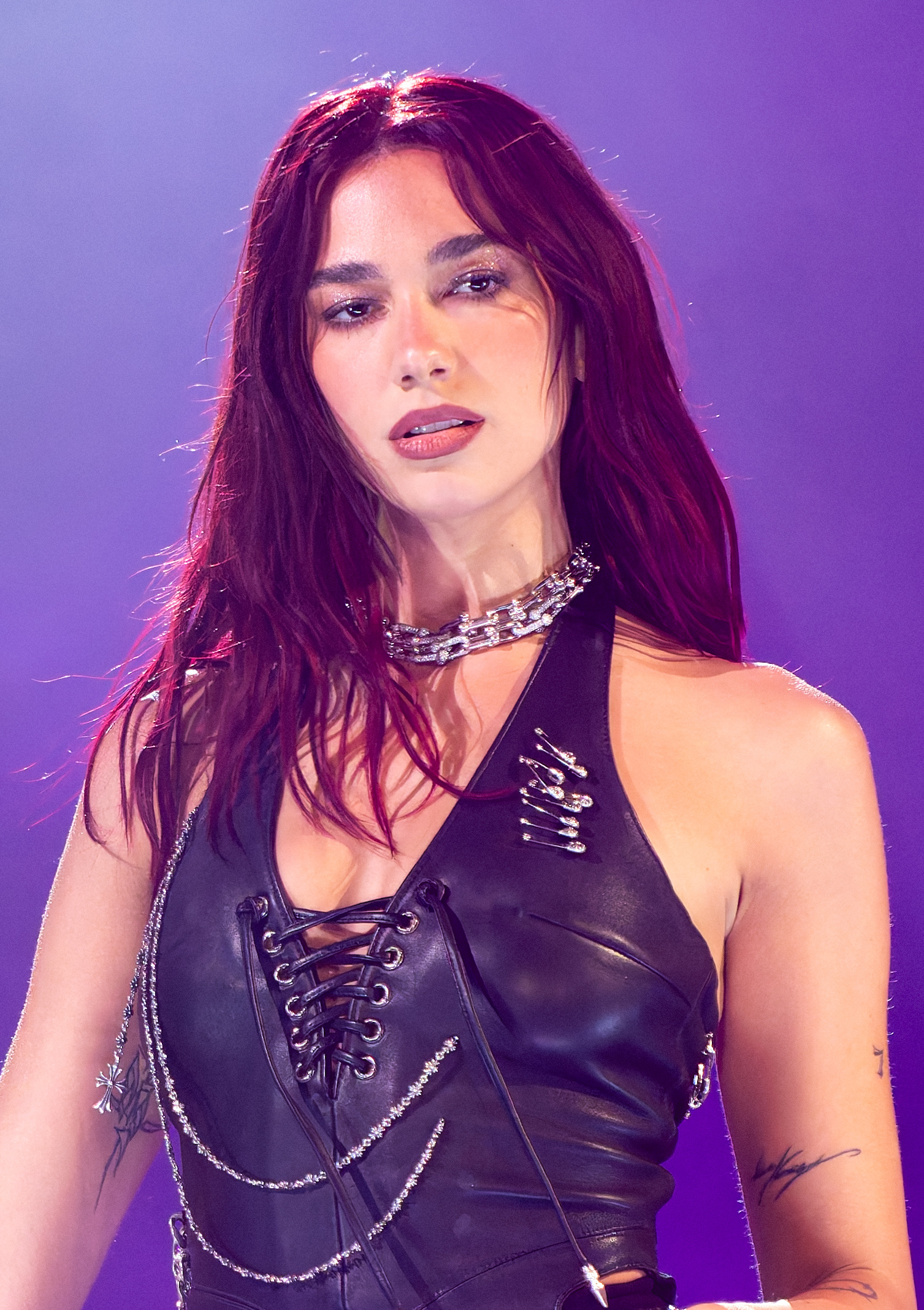
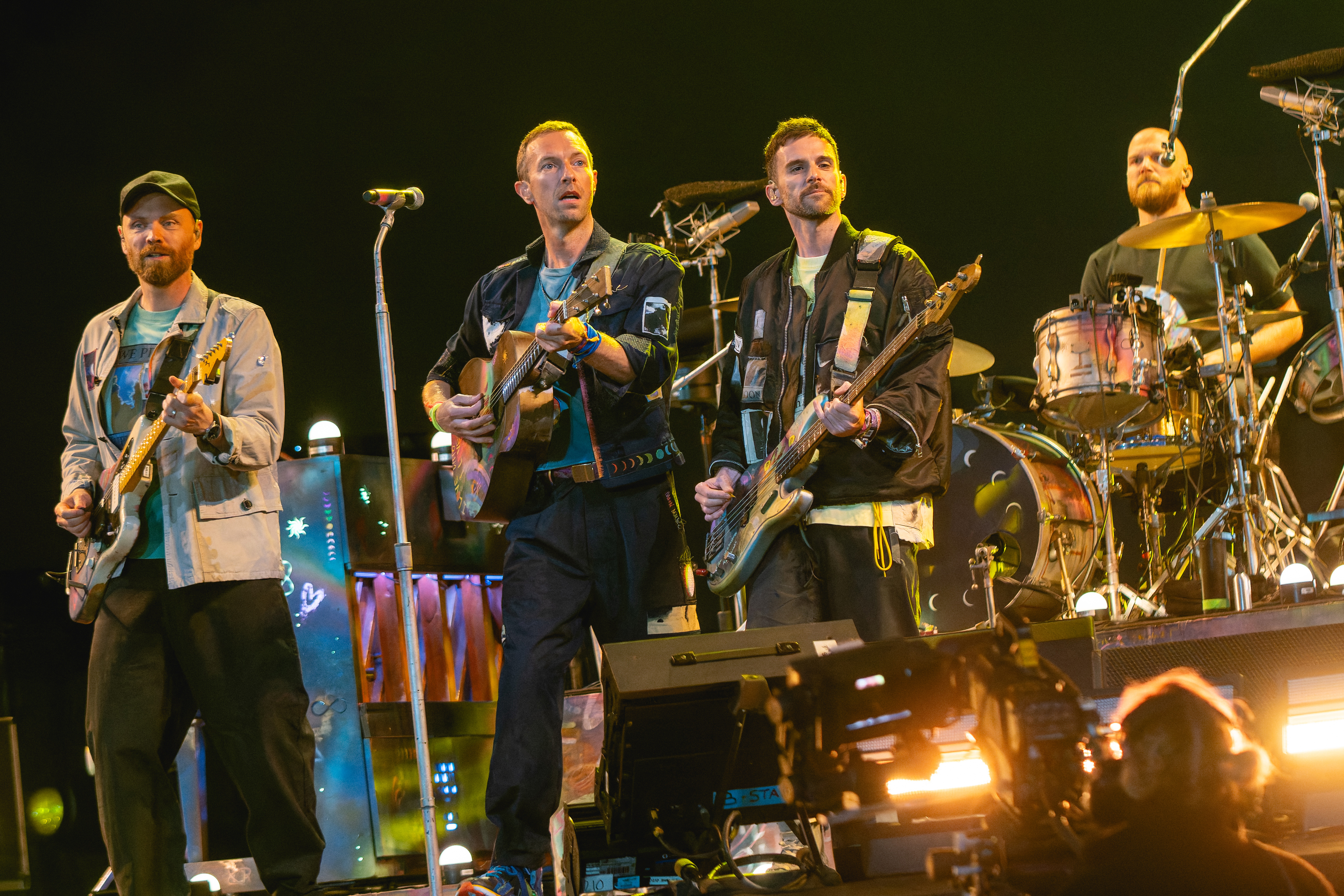
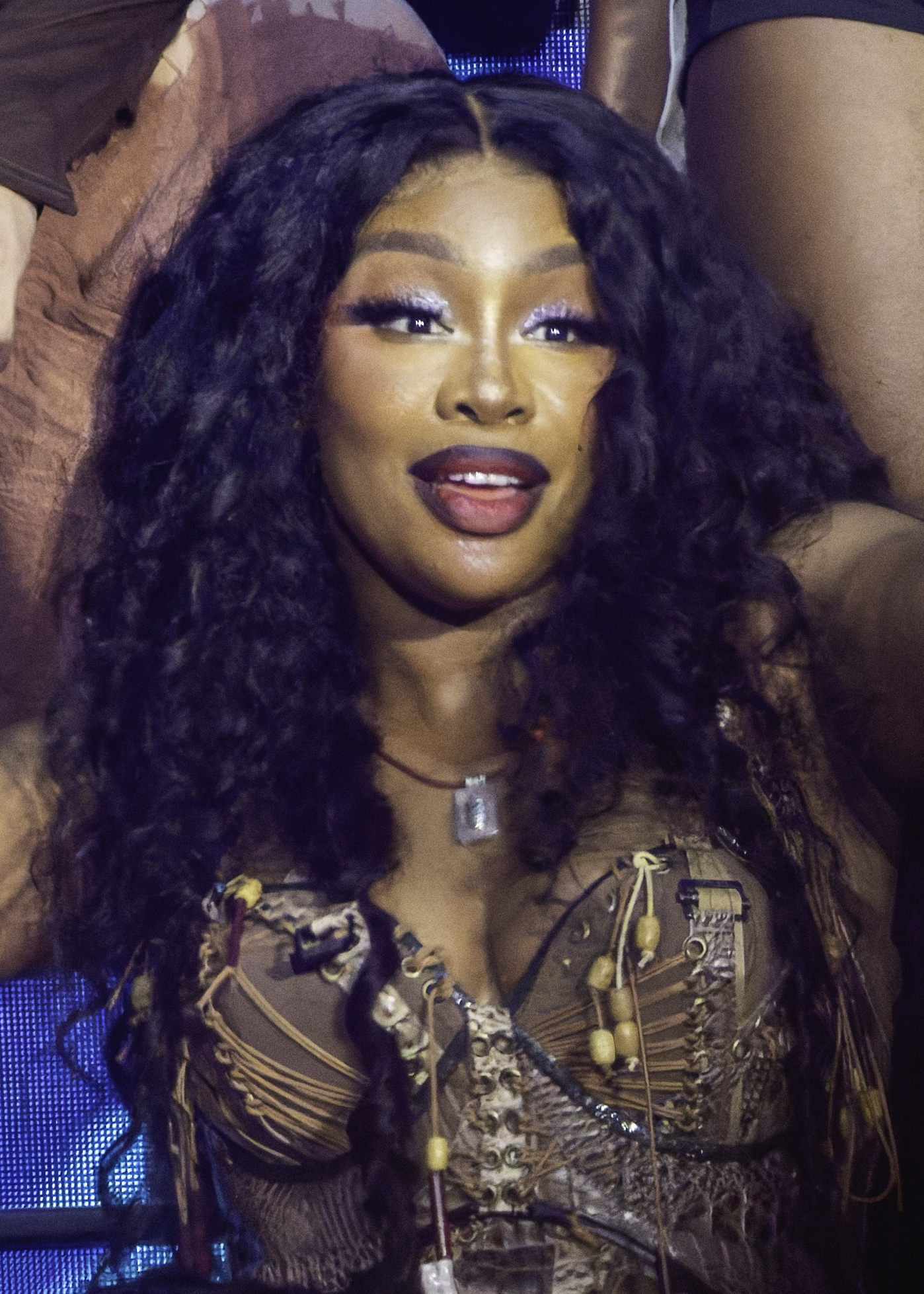
Pyramid Stage headliners Dua Lipa, Coldplay and SZA.

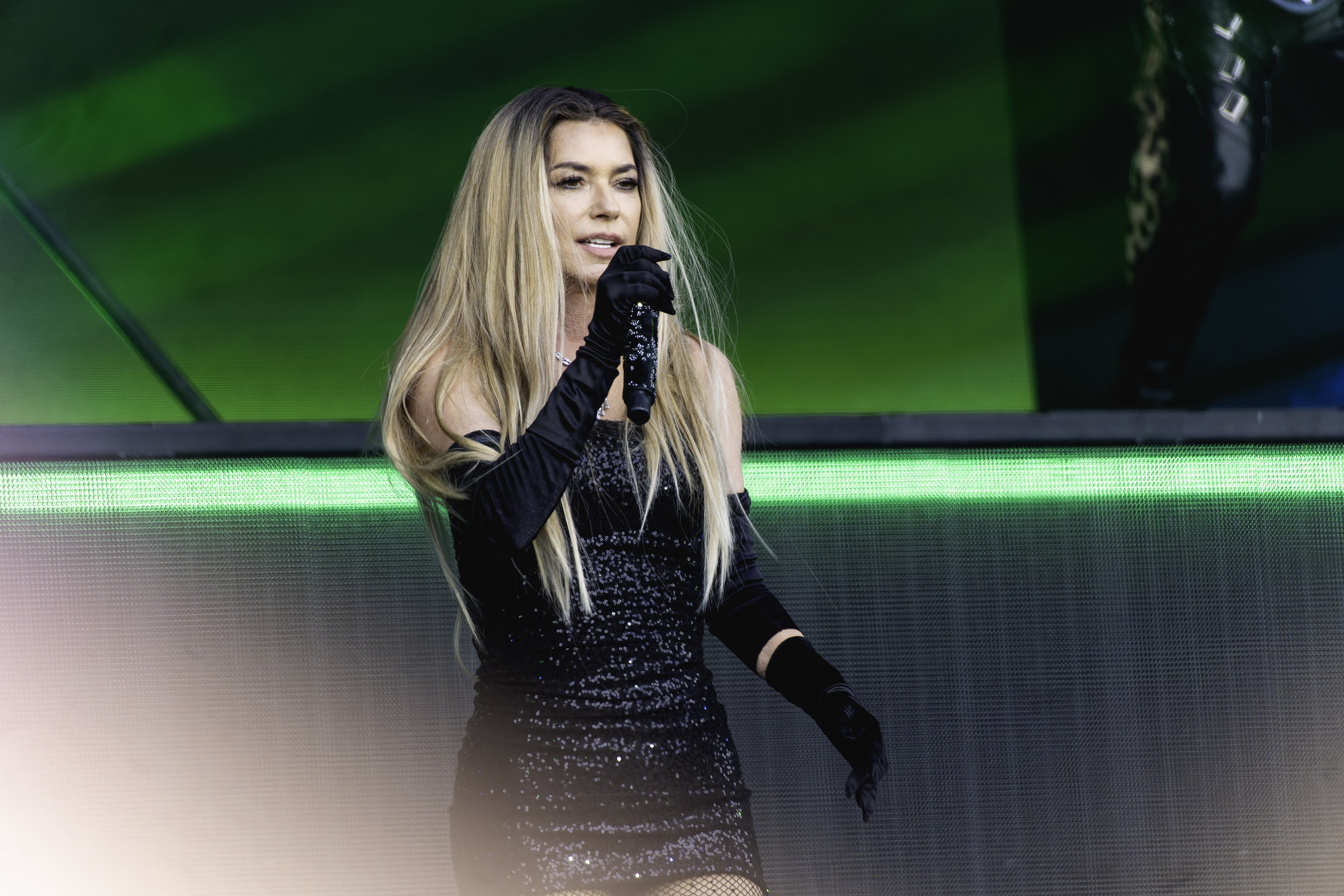
Shania Twain performed in the iconic "Sunday Legends'" slot.

| Friday | Saturday | Sunday |
|---|---|---|
| Dua Lipa^{[A]} 22:00 – 23:45; LCD Soundsystem; 19:45 – 21:00; PJ Harvey^{[B]}^{[C]} 18:00 – 19:00; Paul Heaton^{[D]} 16:15–17:15; Seventeen; 14:45 – 15:45; Olivia Dean; 13:15–14:15; Squeeze; 12:00–12:45 | Coldplay^{[E]} 21:45 – 23:45; Little Simz^{[F]} 19:45 – 20:45; Michael Kiwanuka^{[G]} 17:45 – 18:45; Keane; 16:00 – 17:00; Cyndi Lauper; 14:30 – 15:30; Ayra Starr; 13:15 – 14:00; Femi Kuti; 12:00 – 12:45 | SZA; 21:30 – 23:15; Burna Boy; 19:30 – 20:30; Janelle Monáe; 17:45 – 18:45; Shania Twain^{[H]} 15:45 – 17:00; Paloma Faith; 13:45 – 14:45; Seasick Steve^{[I]} 12:30 – 13:15; Interlinked Ballet; 11:30 – 12:00 |

A. Dua Lipa's set featured a guest appearance from Kevin Parker of Tame Impala.
B. Prior to PJ Harvey's performance, Marina Abramović led the crowd in a seven minute silence.
C. PJ Harvey's set featured John Parish and James Johnston as members of her band.
D. Paul Heaton's set featured a guest appearance from Fatboy Slim.
E. Coldplay's set featured guest appearances from Victoria Canal, Baltic String Orchestra, Elyanna, Little Simz, Femi Kuti, Laura Mvula, Vula Malinga, and Michael J. Fox.
F. Little Simz's set featured guest appearances from Jakwob and Obongjayar, and included Jack Peñate as a member of her band.
G. Michael Kiwanuka's set featured a guest appearance from Lianne La Havas.
H. Shania Twain's set featured Lindsay Ell as part of her band.
I. Seasick Steve's set featured Luther Dickinson as part of his band.

Pyramid Stage Set Lists
Olivia Dean
- 1. OK Love You Bye
- 2. Echo
- 3. Danger
- 4. Be My Own Boyfriend
- 5. Messy
- 6. Time
- 7. UFO
- 8. I Could Be a Florist
- 9. Ladies Room
- 10. Millionaire (Kelis cover)
- 11. Reason to Stay
- 12. The Hardest Part
- 13. Carmen
- 14. Dive
Seventeen
- 1. Maestro
- 2. Ready to Love
- 3. SOS
- 4. Rock with You
- 5. 2 Minus 1
- 6. I Don't Understand but I Luv U
- 7. Cheers to Youth
- 8. Lalali
- 9. Clap
- 10. Hot
- 11. Headliner
- 12. God of Music
- 13. Very Nice
Paul Heaton
- 1. Old Red Eyes Is Back
- 2. I Gotta Praise
- 3. Fish 'N' Chip Supper
- 4. I'll Sail This Ship Alone
- 5. Five Get Over Excited
- 6. D.I.Y.
- 7. Song for Whoever
- 8. I Don't See Them
- 9. Happy Hour (with Fatboy Slim)
- 10. Good as Gold (Stupid as Mud)
- 11. Perfect 10
- 12. Don't Marry Her
- 13. You Keep It All In
- 14. Heatongrad
- 15. Rotterdam (Or Anywhere)
- 16. Caravan of Love
PJ Harvey
- 1. Prayer at the Gate
- 2. The Nether-Edge
- 3. I Inside the Old Year Dying
- 4. The Glorious Land
- 5. Let England Shake
- 6. The Words That Maketh Murder
- 7. 50ft Queenie
- 8. Black Hearted Love
- 9. The Garden
- 10. Man-Size
- 12. Dress
- 13. To Bring You My Love
LCD Soundsystem
- 1. Oh Baby
- 2. I Can Change
- 3. On Repeat
- 4. Tribulations
- 5. Tonite
- 6. Losing My Edge
- 7. Home
- 8. Someone Great
- 9. Dance Yrself Clean
- 10. All My Friends
Dua Lipa
- 1. Training Season
- 2. One Kiss
- 3. Illusion
- 4. Break My Heart
- 5. Levitating
- 6. These Walls
- 7. Be the One
- 8. The Less I Know the Better with Kevin Parker (Tame Impala cover)
- 9. Falling Forever
- 10. Love Again
- 11. Pretty Please
- 12. Hallucinate
- 13. New Rules
- 14. Electricity
- 15. Cold Heart
- 16. Happy For You
- 17. Physical
- 18. Don't Start Now
- 19. Houdini with Kevin Parker
Arya Starr
- 1. Bloody Samaritan
- 2. Control
- 3. Libianca
- 4. Lagos Love Story
- 5. Goodbye (Warm Up)
- 6. Woman Commando
- 7. Away
- 8. Last Heartbreak Song
- 9. Commas
- 10. Rush
- 11. Sability
Cyndi Lauper
- 1. The Goonies 'R' Good Enough
- 2. She Bop
- 3. Into the Nightlife
- 4. Rocking Chair
- 5. I Drove All Night
- 6. Change of Heart
- 7. Time After Time
- 8. Savage Daughter (Sarah Hester Ross cover)/
- 9. Money Changes Everything
- 10. Girls Just Want to Have Fun
- 11. Not My Father's Son
- 12. True Colors
- 13. I'm Gonna Be Strong
Keane
- 1. Bend and Break
- 2. Silenced by the Night
- 3. Nothing in My Way
- 4. We Might as Well Be Strangers
- 5. You Are Young
- 6. Everybody's Changing
- 7. A Bad Dream
- 8. Is It Any Wonder?
- 9. This Is the Last Time
- 10. Crystal Ball
- 11. Somewhere Only We Know
- 12. Sovereign Light Café
- 13. Bedshaped
Michael Kiwanuka
- 1. Hard to Say Goodbye
- 2. You Ain't the Problem
- 3. Rolling
- 4. Black Man in a White World
- 5. Rule the World with Lianne La Havas
- 6. Hero
- 7. Madness
- 8. Final Days
- 9. Solid Ground
- 10. Cold Little Heart
- 11. Love & Hate
Little Simz
- 1. Silhouette
- 2. No Merci
- 3. I Love You, I Hate You
- 4. X
- 5. Heart on Fire
- 6. Introvert
- 7. 101 FM
- 8. Venom
- 9. Mood Swings
- 10. Fever
- 11. SOS
- 12. The Code
- 13. Point and Kill with Obongjayar
- 14. Selfish
- 15. Woman
- 16. Gorilla
Coldplay
- 1. Yellow
- 2. Higher Power
- 3. Adventure of a Lifetime
- 4. Paradise with Victoria Canal
- 5. The Scientist
- 6. Clocks
- 7. Hymn for the Weekend
- 8. Charlie Brown
- 9. Viva la Vida with Baltic String Orchestra
- 10. We Pray with Little Simz, Burna Boy (pre-recorded), Elyana, and Baltic String Orchestra
- 11. Arabesque with Elyana and Femi Kuti
- 12. Violet Hill with a choir led Laura Mvula
- 13. Infinity Sign / Every Teardrop Is a Waterfall / Music of the Spheres II
- 14. Something Just Like This
- 15. My Universe
- 16. A Sky Full of Stars
- 17. Sparks
- 18. The Jumbotron Song
- 19. Humankind with Michael J. Fox, Vula Malinga, and all previous guests
- 20. Fix You with Michael J. Fox
- 21. Feelslikeimfallinginlove
Seasick Steve
- 1. I Don't Know Why She Love Me but She Do
- 2. Backbone Slip
- 3. Barracuda '68
- 4. Move to the Country
- 5. That's All
- 6. Internet Cowboys
- 7. You Can't Teach an Old Dog New Tricks
- 8. Bring It On
Paloma Faith
- 1. There's Nothing More Human Than Failure
- 2. How You Leave a Man
- 3. Bad Woman
- 4. Stone Cold Sober
- 5. Picking Up the Pieces
- 6. God in a Dress
- 7. Make Your Own Kind of Music
- 8. Back to Black (Amy Winehouse cover)
- 9. Let It Ride
- 10. Sweatpants
- 11. Upside Down
- 12. Can't Rely on You
- 13. Cry on the Dancefloor
- 14. Lullaby
- 15. Changing
- 16. Only Love Can Hurt Like This
Shania Twain
- 1. That Don't Impress Me Much
- 2. Don't Be Stupid (You Know I Love You)
- 3. You Win My Love
- 4. Up!
- 5. I'm Gonna Getcha Good!
- 6. You're Still the One
- 7. Forever and for Always
- 8. Come On Over
- 9. Any Man of Mine
- 10. Giddy Up!
- 11. Whose Bed Have Your Boots Been Under?
- 12. Honey, I'm Home
- 13. From This Moment On
- 14. (If You're Not in It for Love) I'm Outta Here!
- 15. Man! I Feel Like a Woman!
Janelle Monáe
- 1. Float
- 2. Champagne Shit
- 3. Django Jane
- 4. Q.U.E.E.N.
- 5. Electric Lady
- 6. Lipstick Lover
- 7. Pynk
- 8. Yoga
- 9. I Like That
- 10. Make Me Feel
- 11. Tightrope
Burna Boy
- 1. Location
- 2. Tested, Approved & Trusted
- 3. For My Hand
- 4. Sittin' on Top of the World
- 5. Temper
- 6. Sungba (Remix)
- 7. Big 7
- 8. Praise Jah in the Moonlight (YG Marley cover)
- 9. Talibans II
- 10. Jerusalema
- 11. It's Plenty
- 12. Gbona
- 13. Yaba Buluku (remix)
- 14. Tshwala Bam
- 15. City Boys
- 16. Ye
- 17. Last Last
SZA
- 1. PSA
- 2. Love Galore
- 3. Broken Clocks
- 4. All the Stars
- 5. Prom
- 6. Garden (Say It like Dat)
- 7. Drew Barrymore
- 8. F2F
- 9. Forgiveless
- 10. Ghost in the Machine
- 11. Blind
- 12. Shirt
- 13. Kiss Me More/Kiss (Prince cover)
- 14. I Hate U
- 15. Snooze
- 16. Kill Bill
- 17. Low
- 18. Supermodel
- 19. Special
- 20. Open Arms
- 21. Nobody Gets Me
- 22. Normal Girl
- 23. Saturn
- 24. Rich Baby Daddy
- 25. The Weekend
- 26. Good Days
- 27. 20 Something

=== Other stage ===
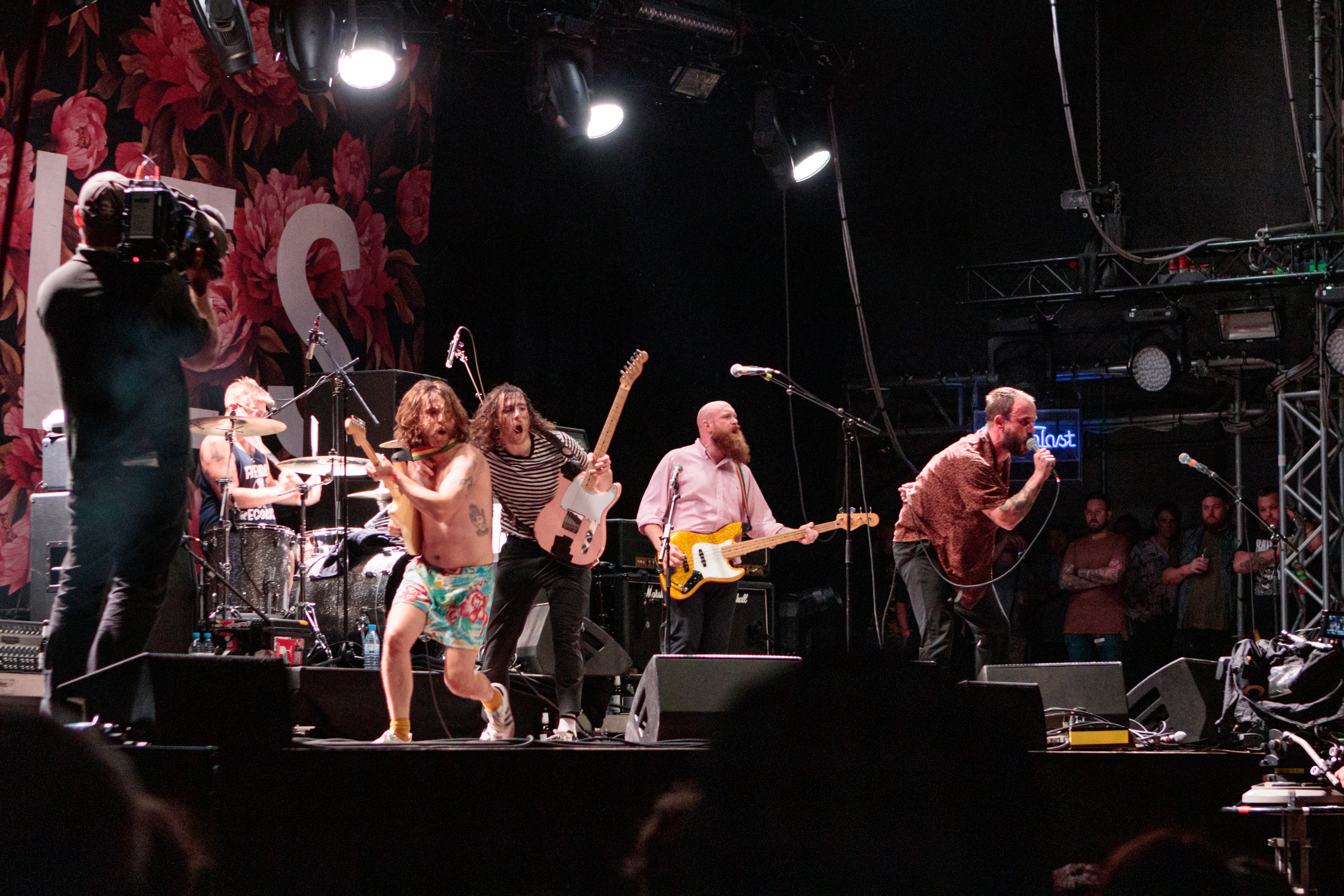
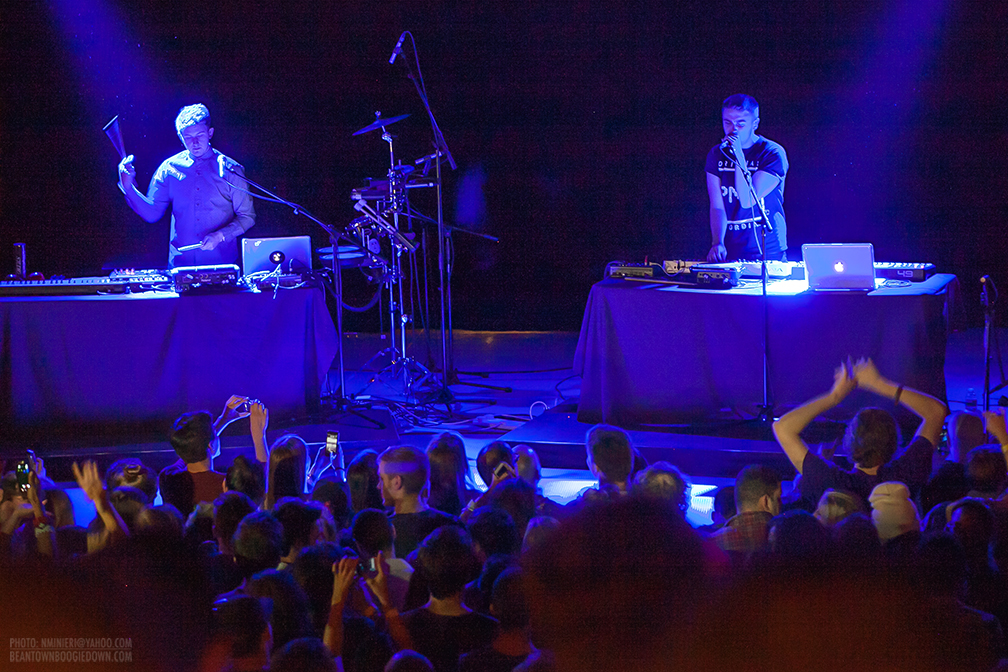
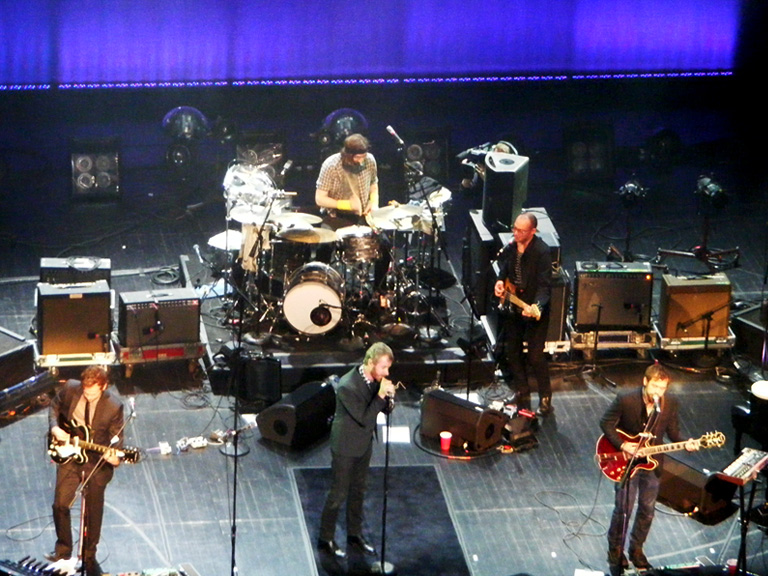
Other Stage headliners Idles, Disclosure and The National.

| Friday | Saturday | Sunday |
|---|---|---|
| Idles^{[A]} 22:15 – 23:30; D-Block Europe^{[B]} 20:30 – 21:30; Anne-Marie^{[C]} 18:45 – 19:45; Bombay Bicycle Club^{[D]} 17:15 – 18:15; Confidence Man; 15:45 – 16:45; Headie One; 14:15 – 15:15; The Snuts; 13:00 – 13:45; Annie Mac; 11:30 – 12:30 | Disclosure^{[E]} 22:30 – 23:45; The Streets; 20:30 – 21:30; Camila Cabello; 18:45 – 19:45; Bloc Party; 17:15 – 18:15; The Last Dinner Party; 15:45 – 16:45; Tems; 14:15 – 15:15; The Staves; 13:00 – 13:45; Jamie Webster; 11:45 – 12:30 | The National^{[F]} 21:45 – 23:15; Two Door Cinema Club; 19:45 – 20:45; Avril Lavigne; 18:00 – 19:00; Nothing But Thieves; 16:30 – 17:30; James; 15:00 – 16:00; Soft Play^{[G]} 13:45 – 14:30; Rachel Chinouriri; 12:30 – 13:15; The Zutons; 11:15 – 12:00 |

A. Idles' set featured a guest appearance from Danny Brown; and they released a boat in a stunt designed by Banksy.
B. D-Block Europe's set featured a guest appearance from Aitch.
C. Anne-Marie's set featured a guest appearance from Aitch.
D. Bombay Bicycle Club's set featured a guest appearance from Damon Albarn.
E. Disclosure's set featured a guest appearance from Sam Smith.
F. The National's set featured a guest appearance from This Is the Kit.
E. Soft Play's set featured a guest appearance from Bob Vylan

=== West Holts stage ===
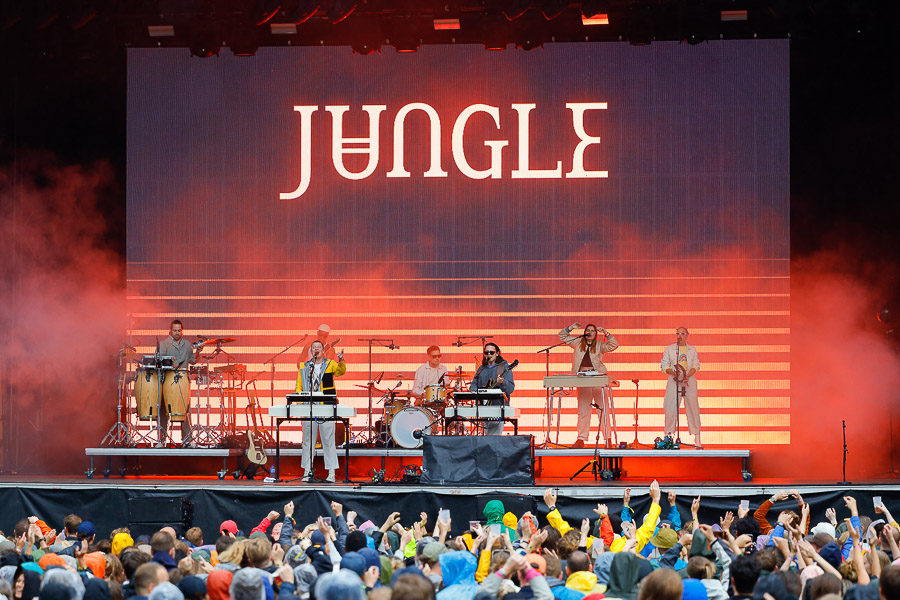
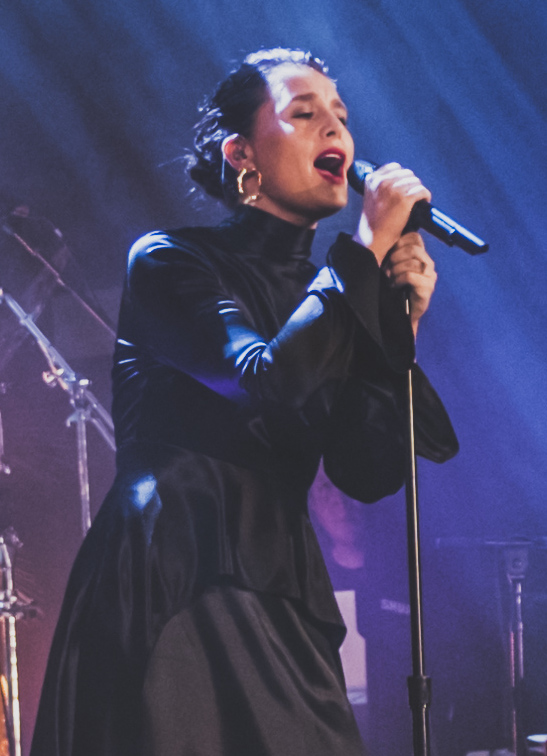
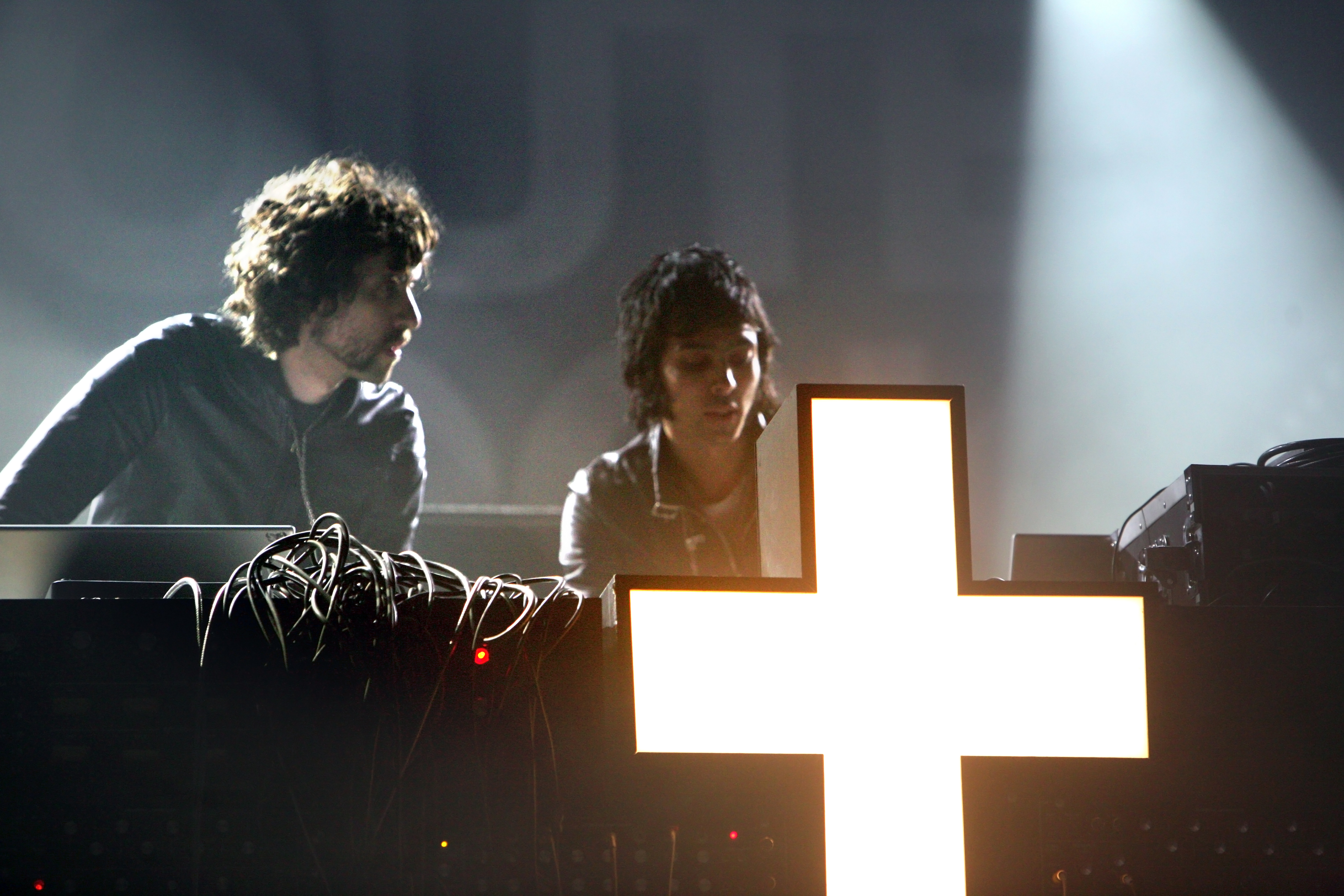
West Holts headliners Jungle, Jessie Ware and Justice.

| Friday | Saturday | Sunday |
|---|---|---|
| Jungle; 22:15 – 23:45; Heilung; 20:15 – 21:15; Danny Brown; 18:30 – 19:30; Sugababes; 16:55 – 17:55; Noname; 15:30 – 16:30; Squid; 14:00 – 15:00; Asha Puthli; 12:30 – 13:30; Sofia Kourtesis; 11:00 – 12:00 | Jessie Ware^{[A]} 22:15 – 23:45; Masego; 20:30 – 21:30; Black Pumas; 19:00 – 20:00; Nitin Sawhney^{[B]} 17:30 – 18:30; Corinne Bailey Rae; 16:00 – 17:00; Alogte Oho & His Sounds of Joy; 14:30 – 15:30; The Skalites; 13:00 – 14:00; 47Soul; 11:30 – 12:30 | Justice; 22:00 – 23:45; Nia Archives; 20:00 – 21:00; Brittany Howard; 18:30 – 19:30; Jordan Rakei; 17:00 – 18:00; Steel Pulse; 15:30 – 16:30; Balming Tiger; 14:00 – 15:00; Jalen Ngonda; 12:30 – 13:30; Matthew Halsall; 11:00 – 12:00 |

A. Jessie Ware's set featured a guest appearance from Romy Madley Croft.
B. Nitin Sawhney's set featured a guest appearance from Andy Serkis.

=== Woodsies stage ===
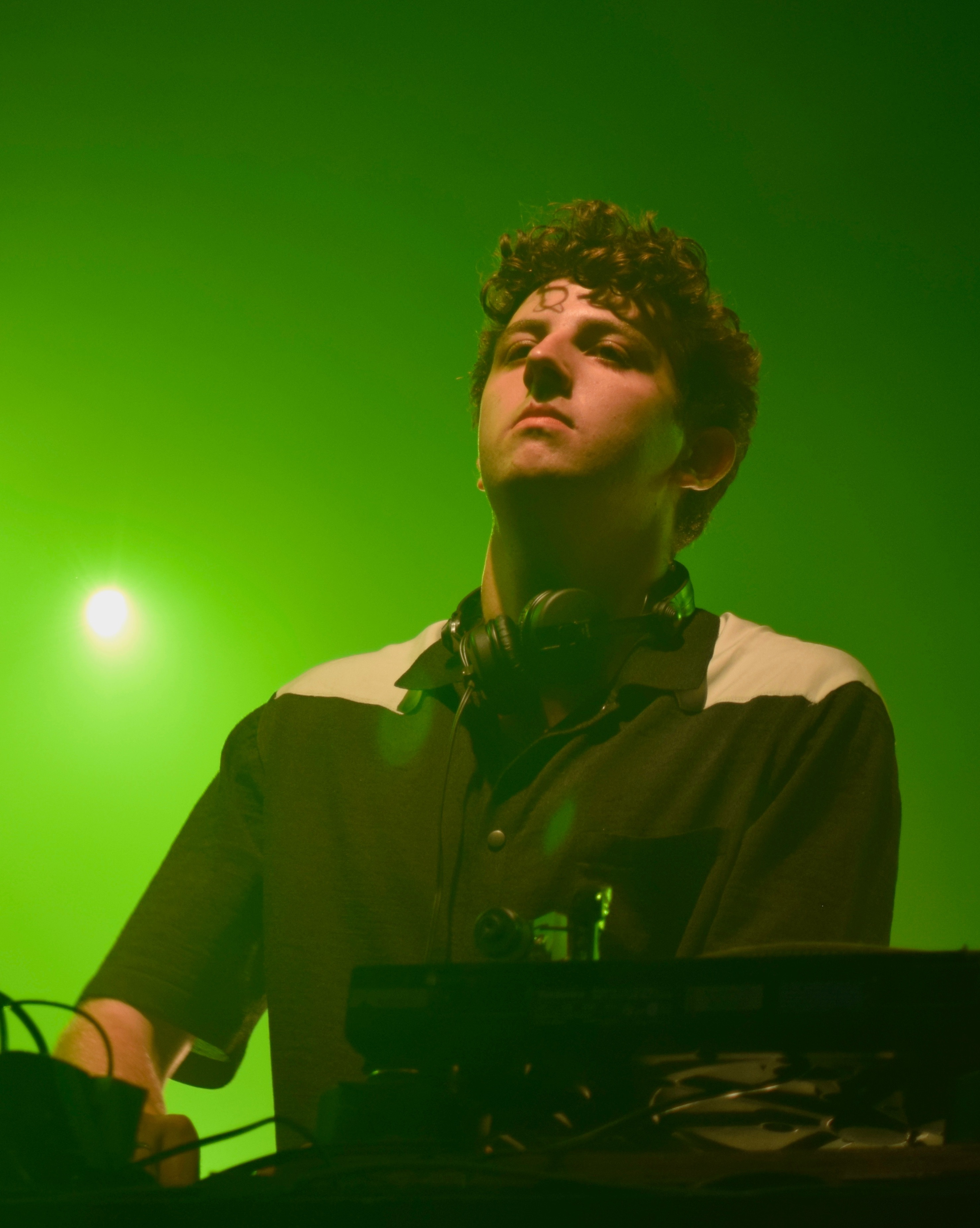
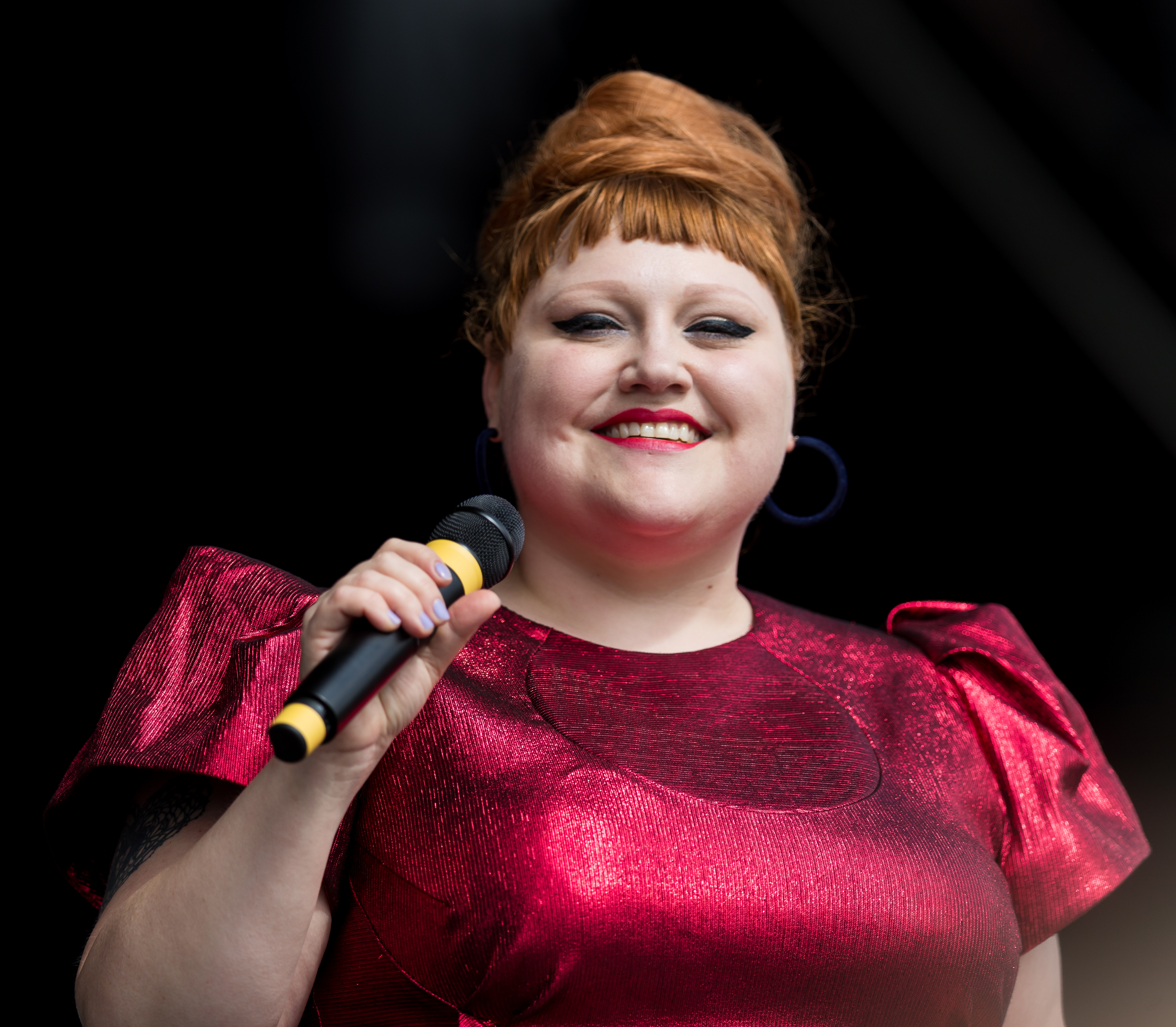
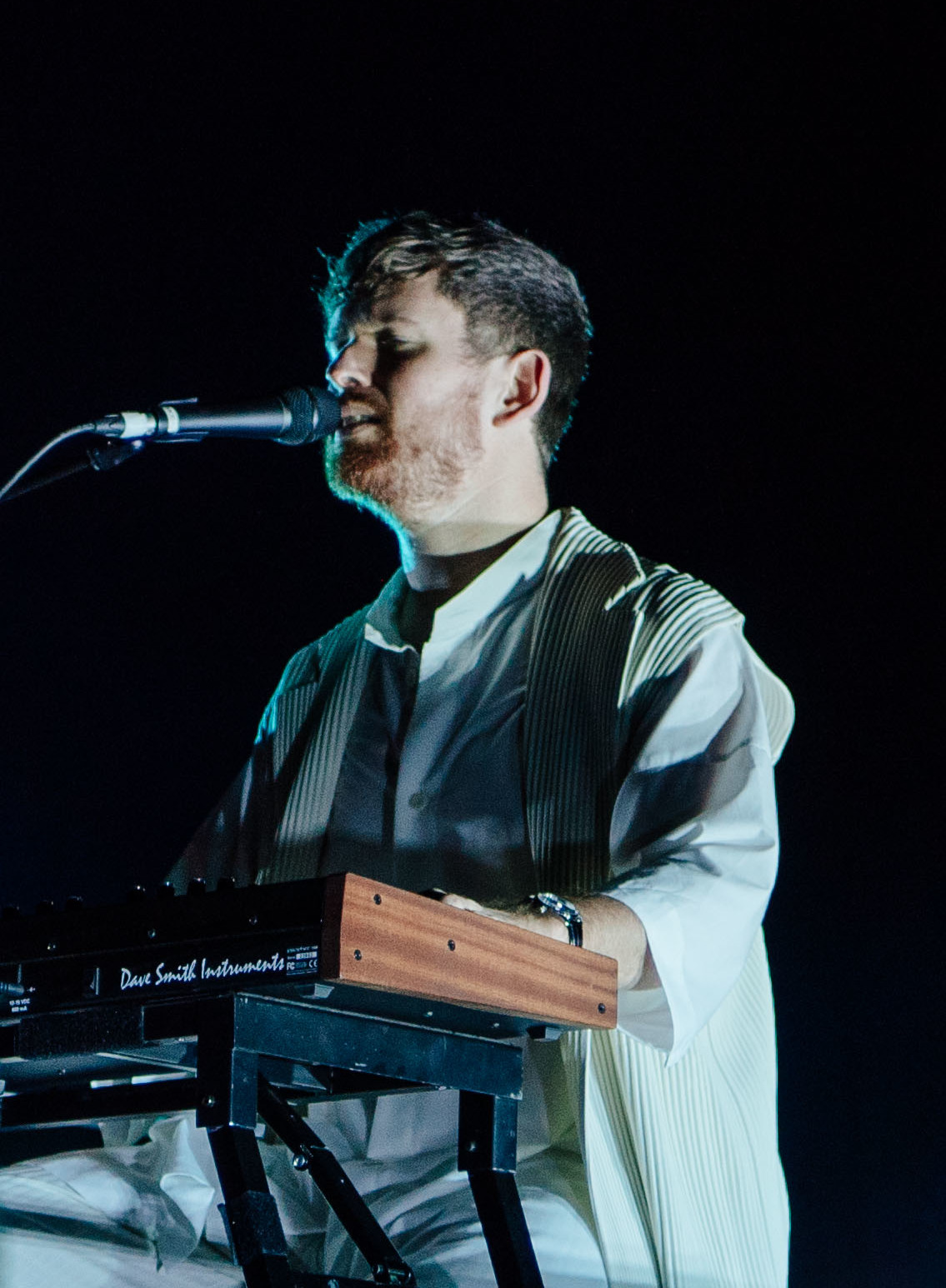
Woodsies headliners Jamie xx, Gossip and James Blake.

| Friday | Saturday | Sunday |
|---|---|---|
| Jamie xx^{[A]} 22:30 – 23:45; Sampha; 21:00 – 22:00; Declan McKenna; 19:30 – 20:30; Arlo Parks^{[B]} 18:00 – 19:00; The Vaccines; 16:30 – 17:30; Kenya Grace; 15:15 – 16:00; Remi Wolf; 14:00 – 14:45; Lambrini Girls; 12:45 – 13:30; Voice of Baceprot; 11:30 – 12:15 | Gossip; 22:30 – 23:45; Sleaford Mods; 21:00 – 22:00; Yard Act; 19:30 – 20:30; Kasabian; 18:00 – 19:00; Fat White Family; 16:30 – 17:30; Soccer Mommy; 15:15 – 16:00; Mannequin Pussy; 14:00 – 14:45; High Vis; 12:45; 13:30; Kneecap; 11:30 – 12:15 | James Blake^{[C]} 21:30 – 22:45; Romy; 20:00 – 21:00; Kim Gordon; 18:30 – 19:30; Alvvays; 17:00 – 18:00; Blondshell; 15:30 – 16:30; NewDad; 14:00 – 15:00; The K's; 12:30 – 13:30; Jayahadadream; 11:15 – 12:00 |

A. Jamie xx's set featured guest appearances from his The xx bandmates Romy Madley Croft and Oliver Sim, and a guest appearance from Robyn.
B. Arlo Park's set featured a guest appearance from Remi Wolf.
C. James Blake's set featured a guest appearance from Dave.

=== The Park stage ===
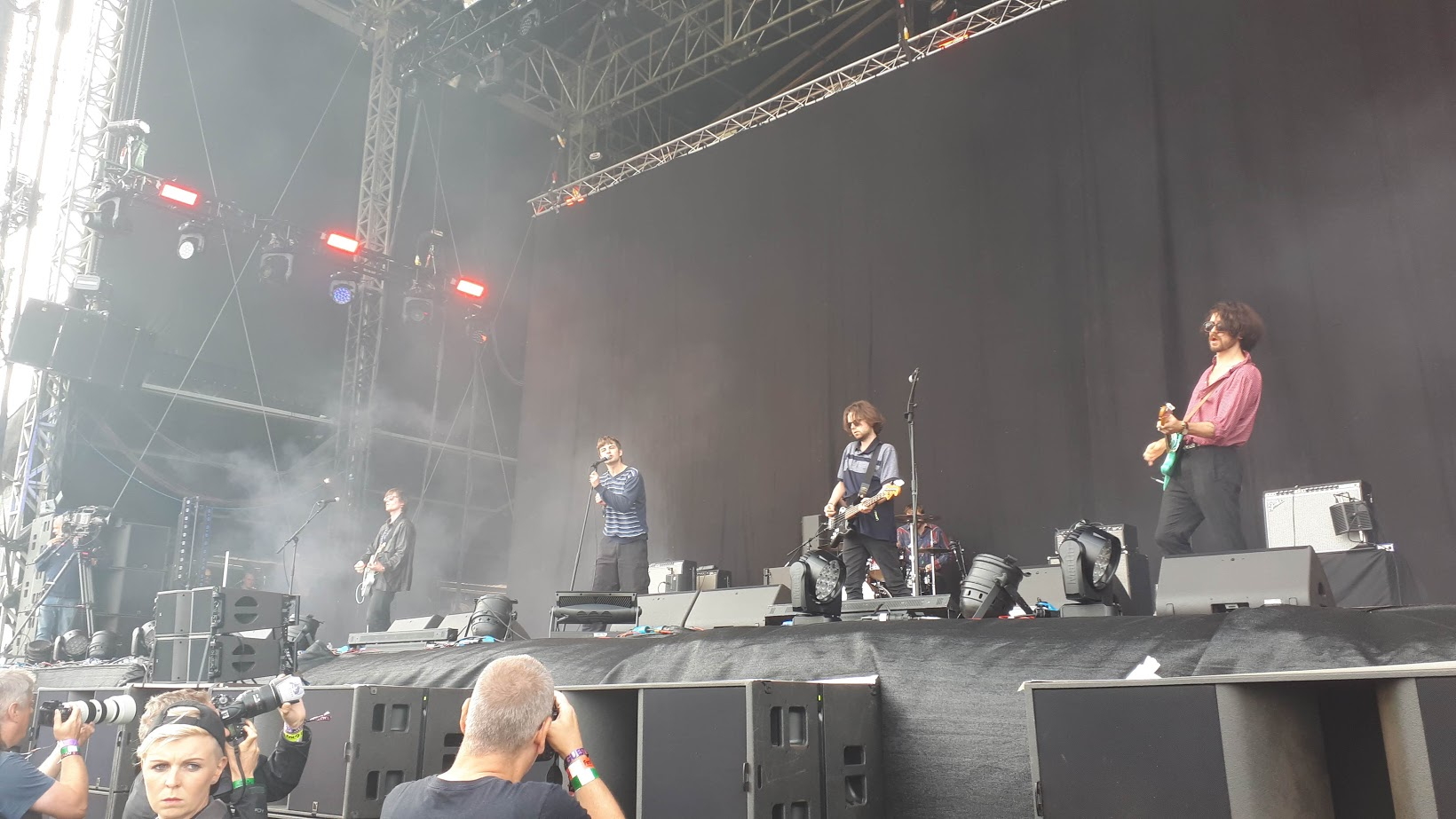
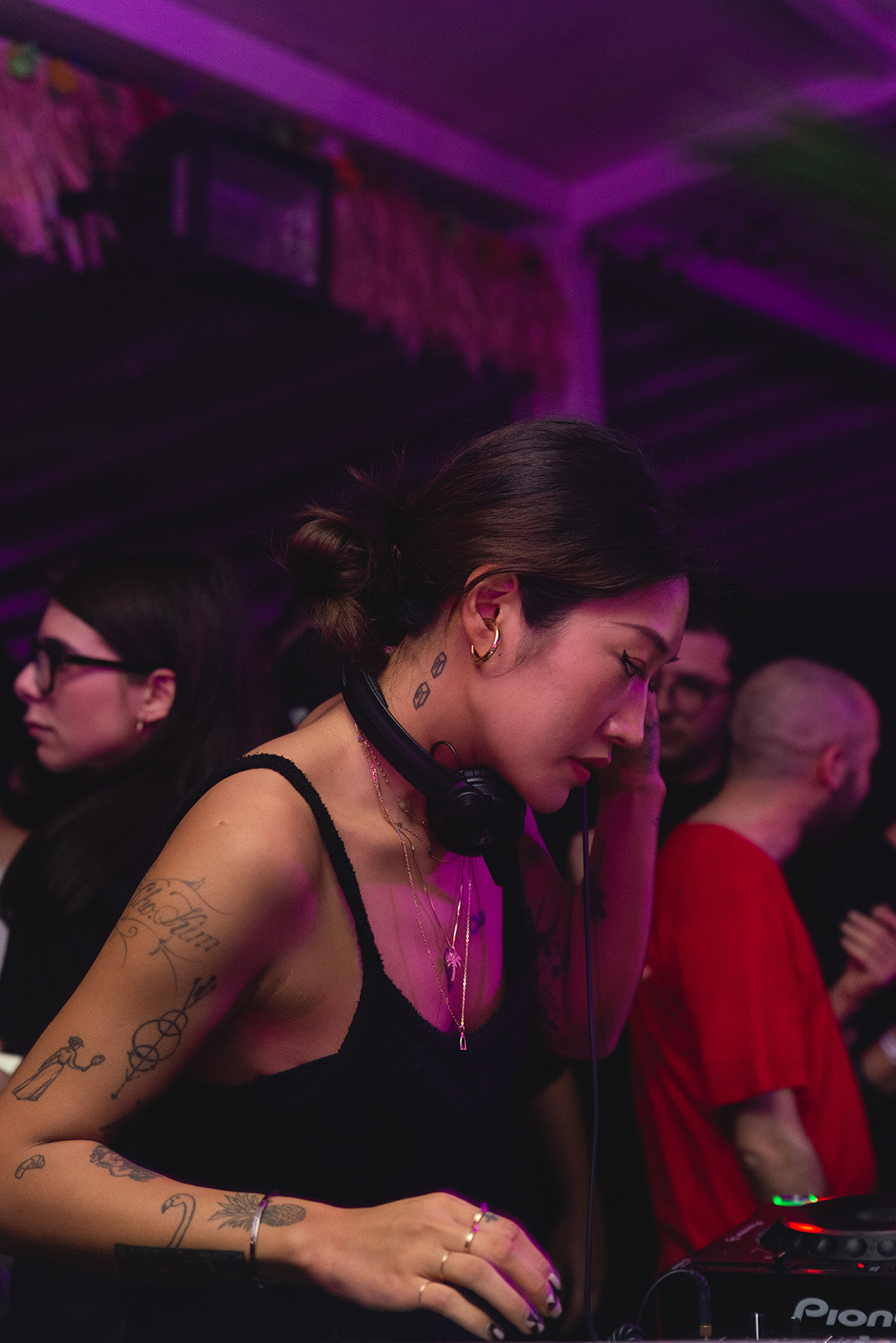
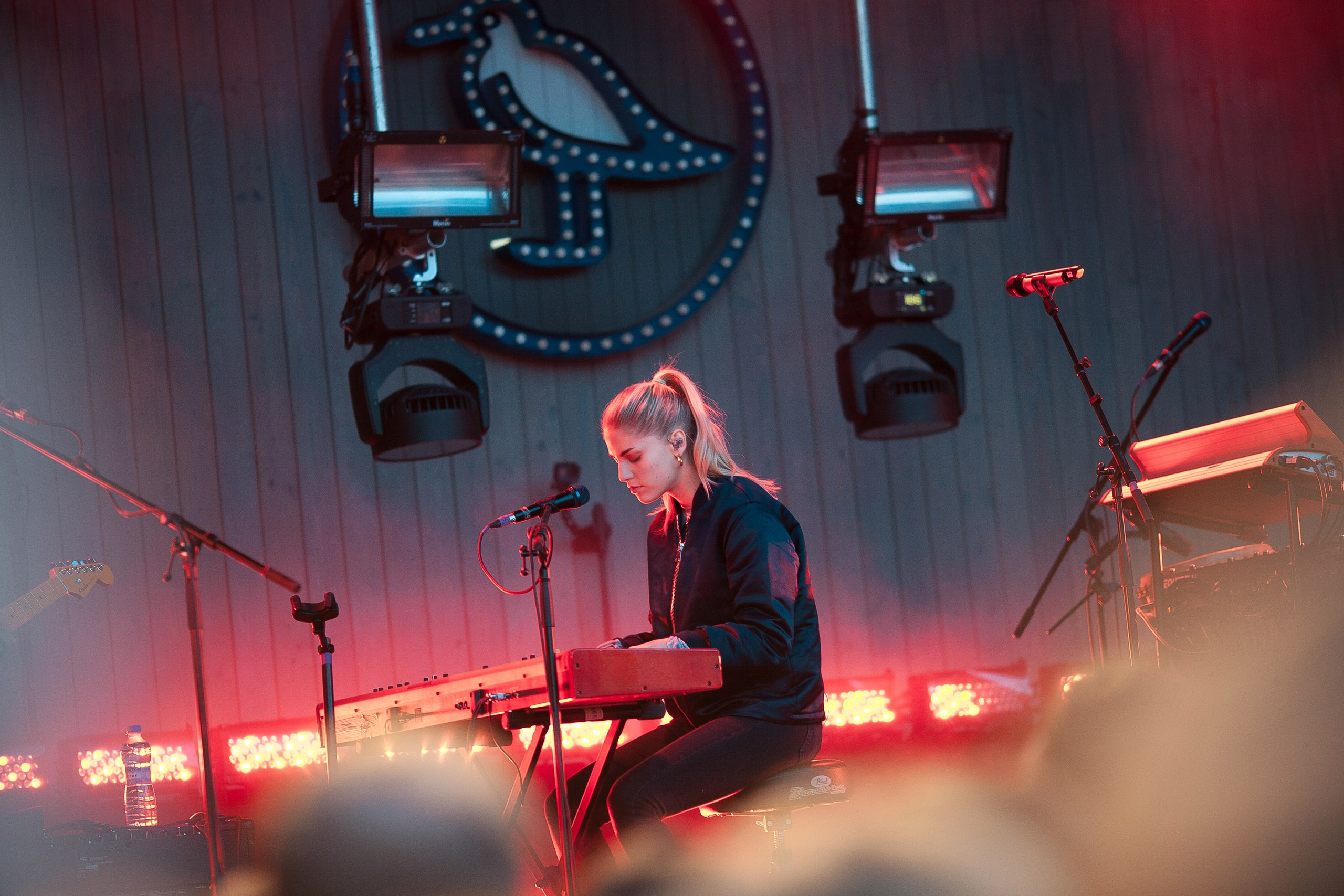
Park Stage headliners Fontaines D.C., Peggy Gou, and London Grammar.

| Friday | Saturday | Sunday |
|---|---|---|
| Fontaines D.C. 23:00 – 00:15; King Krule; 21:15 – 22:15; Aurora; 19:30 – 20:30; Dexys Midnight Runners; 18:00 – 19:00; This Is the Kit^{[B]} 16:30 – 17:30; The Mary Wallopers; 15:15 – 16:00; Barry Can't Swim^{[A]} 14:00 – 14:45; Moonchild Sanelly; 12:45 – 13:30; Lynks; 11:30 – 12:10 | Peggy Gou^{[D]} 23:00 – 00:15; Orbital^{[C]} 21:15 – 22:15; The Breeders; 19:30 – 20:30; Lankum; 18:00 – 19:00; Arooj Aftab; 16:30 – 17:30; Otoboke Beaver; 15:15 – 16:00; Bar Italia; 14:00 – 14:45; Kara Jackson; 12:45 – 13:30; Johnny Flynn; 11:10 – 12:10 | London Grammar; 21:15 – 22:30; Ghetts^{[F]} 19:30 – 20:30; Mount Kimbie^{[E]} 18:00 – 19:00; Baxter Dury; 16:30 – 17:30; Mdou Moctar; 15:15 – 16:00; Psychedelic Porn Crumpets; 14:00 – 14:45; Lime Garden; 12:45 – 13:30; Problem Patterns; 11:30 – 12:45 |

A. Barry Can't Swim's set featured a guest appearance from somedeadbeat.
B. This is the Kit's set featured a guest appearance from Suntou Susso.
C. Peggy Gou's set featured a guest appearance from Sophie Ellis-Bextor.
D. Orbital's set featured guest appearances from Tilda Swinton and Melanie C.
E. Mount Kimbie's set featured a guest appearance from King Krule.
F. Ghetts' set featured a guest appearances from Sampha, Shakka, Wretch 32, Kano, and Moonchild Sanelly.

=== Acoustic stage ===
| Friday | Saturday | Sunday |
|---|---|---|
| The Bootleg Beatles; 21:30 – 22:45; Scouting for Girls; 20:00 – 21:00; Tanita Tikaram; 18:30 – 19:30; Dervish; 17:00 – 18:00; Stornoway; 16:00 – 16:40; Red Hot Chilli Pipers; 15:00 – 15:40; Josh Rouse; 14:00 – 14:40; Angie McMahon; 13:00 – 13:40; John Smith; 12:10 – 12:40; The Burma; 11:30 – 12:00 | Ocean Colour Scene; 21:30 – 22:45; Ralph McTell; 20:00 – 21:00; Russell Crowe's Indoor Garden Party; 18:30 – 19:30; The Manfreds; 17:00 – 18:00; Albert Lee; 16:00 – 16:40; Fun Lovin' Crime Writers^{[A]} 15:00 – 15:40; Paul Casey; 14:00 – 14:40; Jessie Reid; 13:00 – 13:40; Ryan McMullan; 12:10 – 12:40; Jada Starr; 11:30 – 12:00 | Gipsy Kings; 21:30 – 22:45; Judy Collins; 20:00 – 21:00; London Community Gospel Choir; 18:30 – 19:30; Songwriter's Arc^{[B]} 17:00 – 18:00; Bernard Butler; 16:10 – 17:00; Michele Stodart; 15:00 – 15:50; Grace Petrie; 14:00 – 14:40; Nadia Kadek; 13:00 – 13:40; Frankie Archer; 12:10 – 12:40; Toby Lee; 11:30 – 12:00 |

A. Featuring: Mark Billingham, Chris Brookmyre, Doug Johnstone, Val McDermid, Stuart Neville, and Luca Veste
B. Featuring: Chris Difford, Beth Nielsen Chapman, Guy Chambers, Sid Griffin, and Jessie Reid

=== Avalon stage ===
| Friday | Saturday | Sunday |
|---|---|---|
| Skindred; 23:05 – 00:20; Kate Nash; 21:35 – 22:35; Haircut 100; 20:05 – 21:05; Lulu; 18:35 – 19:35; Frank Turner; 17:05 – 18:05; Billie Marten; 15:40 – 16:40; The Deep Blue; 14:20 – 15:10; The Bar-Steward Sons of Val Doonican; 13:00 – 13:50 | New Model Army; 23:10 – 00:20; The Magic Numbers; 21:40 – 22:40; Shaznay Lewis; 20:10 – 21:10; B.C. Camplight; 18:40 – 19:40; Flyte; 17:10 – 18:10; Lucy Spraggan; 15:40 – 16:40; Cut Capers; 14:15 – 15:15; Elles Bailey; 12:50 – 13:45; Old Time Sailors; 11:30 – 12:20 | The Feeling; 22:50 – 23:50; Caity Baser; 21:20 – 22:20; The Cat Empire; 19:55 – 20:55; Baby Queen; 18:20 – 19:20; The Go! Team; 16:50 – 17:50; The Scratch; 15:25 – 16:25; Toyah Willcox & Robert Fripp; 13:55 – 14:55; Kingfishr; 12:35 – 13:25; The Ayoub Sisters; 11:30 – 12:10 |

=== Left Field ===
| Friday | Saturday | Sunday |
|---|---|---|
| Billy Bragg; 21:00 – 22:00; Sprints; 19:50 – 20:30; Seb Lowe; 18:40 – 19:20; Big Special; 17:35 – 18:10; Trampolene; 16:30 – 17:05 | Billy Nomates; 21:00 – 22:00; English Teacher; 19:50 – 20:30; Louis Dunford; 18:40 – 19:20; Calum Bowie; 17:35 – 18:10; 47Soul; 16:30 – 17:05 | Bob Vylan; 21:00 – 22:00; The Farm; 19:45 – 20:30; The Lottery Winners; 18:35 – 19:15; Will Varley; 17:30 – 18:10; Pillow Queens; 16:30 – 17:00 |

== Reception ==
The following artists received starred reviews from news publications:

Glastonbury 2024 reviews
| Artist | The Guardian | The Independent | NME | The Telegraph | Ref/s |
|---|---|---|---|---|---|
| Aurora | —N/a | —N/a | —N/a | 5/5 stars | |
| Ayra Starr | —N/a | —N/a | —N/a | 4/5 stars | |
| Avril Lavigne | 4/5 stars | —N/a | 3/5 stars | 5/5 stars | |
| Bloc Party | —N/a | —N/a | —N/a | 5/5 stars | |
| Burna Boy | 4/5 stars | —N/a | —N/a | 4/5 stars | |
| Coldplay | 5/5 stars | 5/5 stars | 4/5 stars | 5/5 stars | |
| Camila Cabello | —N/a | —N/a | 3/5 stars | —N/a | |
| Cyndi Lauper | 3/5 stars | 4/5 stars | —N/a | 2/5 stars | |
| Disclosure | —N/a | —N/a | —N/a | 5/5 stars | |
| Dua Lipa | 4/5 stars | 4/5 stars | 4/5 stars | 4/5 stars | |
| Gossip | —N/a | —N/a | —N/a | 5/5 stars | |
| Jessie Ware | —N/a | —N/a | —N/a | 4/5 stars | |
| Justice | —N/a | —N/a | 4/5 stars | —N/a | |
| Kasabian | 3/5 stars | —N/a | —N/a | 5/5 stars | |
| The Last Dinner Party | —N/a | 4/5 stars | —N/a | 4/5 stars | |
| Little Simz | 5/5 stars | —N/a | 4/5 stars | 4/5 stars | |
| Lulu | —N/a | —N/a | —N/a | 4/5 stars | |
| The National | —N/a | —N/a | 5/5 stars | 5/5 stars | |
| Olivia Dean | —N/a | —N/a | —N/a | 5/5 stars | |
| PJ Harvey | —N/a | 4/5 stars | —N/a | 4/5 stars | |
| Russell Crowe | 3/5 stars | —N/a | —N/a | —N/a | |
| Seventeen | —N/a | —N/a | 5/5 stars | —N/a | |
| Shania Twain | 4/5 stars | 4/5 stars | 3/5 stars | 2/5 stars | |
| The Streets | —N/a | 5/5 stars | —N/a | —N/a | |
| SZA | 5/5 stars | 4/5 stars | 4/5 stars | 3/5 stars | |
