= Love and Hate =

Love and Hate may refer to:

- Love and hate (psychoanalysis), psychoanalytic concepts

== Books ==
- "Catullus 85", a poem by Catullus the first line thus commonly referred to as Odo at Amo which translates as hate and love
- Love and Hate, 1970 Russian novel by Ivan Shevtsov
- Love and Hate: The Natural History of Behavior Patterns, a 1970 German book by Irenäus Eibl-Eibesfeld
- Love + Hate: Stories and Essays, collection of stories and essays by Hanif Kureishi 2015

== Film and TV ==
- Love and Hate (1916 film), a lost silent film
- Love and Hate (1924 film), a silent British film directed by Thomas Bentley
- Love and Hate, 1935 Russian film by Albert Gendelshtein with music by Shostakovich
- Love and Hate: The Story of Colin and JoAnn Thatcher, 1989 TV film with Kenneth Welsh
- Love + Hate (2005 film), a British drama film
- Love/Hate (TV series), an Irish TV crime drama series

== Music ==
- Love & Hate (Aceyalone album), 2003
- Love & Hate (Aventura album), 2003
- Love and Hate (Joan Osborne album), 2014
- Love & Hate (Hyolyn album), 2013
- Love & Hate (Lil Rob album), 2009
- Love & Hate (Michael Kiwanuka album), 2016
- Love & Hate (Section 25 album), 1988
- Love and Hate, a 2016 EP by electronic artist Aero Chord
- Love & Hate, a 2004 EP by Ping Pung
- "Love & Hate" (Ryuichi Sakamoto song), a 1994 song by Ryuichi Sakamoto featuring Holly Johnson
- Love & Hate (Michael Kiwanuka song), 2016

== See also ==
- Ambivalence, a state of having simultaneous, conflicting reactions towards some object
- Between Love and Hate (disambiguation)
- Love Hate (disambiguation)
- Love–hate relationship, a relationship involving simultaneous or alternating emotions of love and hate
