= Love & Hate (Michael Kiwanuka song) =

Single by Michael Kiwanuka

from the album Love & Hate
- Released: 7 April 2016
- Recorded: 2016
- Genre: Indie rock; soul
- Length: 7:07
- Label: Polydor (UK); Interscope (US)
- Songwriter(s): Michael Kiwanuka
- Producer(s): Danger Mouse; Inflo; Paul Butler

Michael Kiwanuka singles chronology
| "Black Man in a White World" (2016) | "Love & Hate" (2016) | "One More Night" (2016) |

"Love & Hate" is a song by British singer/songwriter Michael Kiwanuka, released as the title track on his second studio album, Love & Hate. It was released as the second of four singles from the album on 7th of April 2016.

== Use in other media ==
The song has been featured in various TV shows and films, including the Netflix drama Seven Seconds, the Netflix docudrama When They See Us, the legal drama Suits (season 7, episode 8), Rosewood (season 1, episode 22), Animal Kingdom (season 3, episode 11), Dear White People (season 1, episode 5) the movie The Tax Collector, as well as two Italian productions, My Brother Chases Dinosaurs and the series Speravo de morì prima, based in the final season of footballer Francesco Totti at AS Roma.

== Reception ==
In a 4/4 star review of the album by Greg Kot of the Chicago Tribune, he says of the song "The seven-minute title track picks up on that wide open sense of possibility, as the narrator searches for a world with “no more pain and no more shame and misery.” As he hardens himself for the struggle ahead, strings pull the arrangement toward a buzzing guitar solo. When the smoke clears, the narrator is not alone — the choir shadows him, and is the only sound he hears as the music fades."

== Track listing ==
| No. | Title | Length |
|---|---|---|
| 1. | "Love & Hate" | 7:07 |
| 2. | "Love & Hate (Radio Edit)" | 3:34 |

== Personnel ==
Performers and musicians

- Michael Kiwanuka - vocals, electric guitar, lead guitar, acoustic guitar, backing vocals
- Inflo - piano, drums, bass, backing vocals
- Brian Burton - bass, organ
- Graham Godfrey - percussion
- Paul Boldeau - backing vocals
- Phebe Edwards - backing vocals
- LaDonna Harley-Peters - backing vocals
- Wired Strings
  - Jenny Sacha - violin
  - Gillon Cameron - violin
  - Anna Croad - violin
  - Sally Jackson - violin
  - Patrick Kieman - violin
  - Eleanor Mathieson violin
  - Kotono Sato - violin
  - Debbie Widdup – violin
  - Emma Owens - viola
  - Nzomi Cohen - viola
  - Rosia Danvers - cello
  - Bryony James - cello
  - Richard Pryce - double bass
  - Huw White - string arrangements

Technical

- Brian Burton (As Danger Mouse) - production
- Inflo - production
- Richard Woodcraft – engineering, strings engineering, mixing
- Todd Monfalcone – engineering
