= Cold Little Heart =

Single by Michael Kiwanuka

from the album Love & Hate
- Released: 24 February 2017
- Recorded: 2016
- Genre: Indie rock; soul
- Length: 9:58
- Label: Polydor (UK); Interscope (US)
- Songwriter: Michael Kiwanuka
- Producers: Danger Mouse; Inflo; Paul Butler

Michael Kiwanuka singles chronology
"One More Night" (2016)	"Cold Little Heart" (2017)	"Money" (2019)

"Cold Little Heart" is a song by British singer/songwriter Michael Kiwanuka, from his second studio album, Love & Hate. It was released as the fourth and final single from the album on 24 February 2017.

The song was used in the opening credits of the American noir comedy series Big Little Lies.

== Music video ==
A music video to accompany the release of "Cold Little Heart" as a single was first released onto YouTube on 23 March 2017, where it has reached over 250 million views as of November 2025.

== Reception ==
Marcus J. Moore of Pitchfork stated that "Cold Little Heart" was the best song on Love & Hate, saying "the album's 10-minute opener is easily the record's best song, landing somewhere between Pink Floyd's soul/rock hybrid and Isaac Hayes' orchestral arrangements".

In another positive review of the album, Alexis Petridis of The Guardian states: "It takes confidence to open an album with a song that lasts over 10 minutes, the first five of them entirely instrumental. That confidence could obviously be wildly misplaced – a five minute instrumental overture replete with strings, wordless backing vocals and melancholy slide guitar that sounds not unlike the work of Pink Floyd’s David Gilmour could be an exercise in terrible hollow pomposity. But instead, Cold Little Heart proceeds with a stately assurance: the moment where the song suddenly pulls into focus is really thrilling."

== Track listing ==
No.	Title	Length
1.	"Cold Little Heart"	9:58
2.	"Cold Little Heart (Radio Edit)"	3:30

== Personnel ==
Performers and musicians

- Michael Kiwanuka - vocals, electric guitar, lead guitar, acoustic guitar
- Inflo - piano, drums
- Brian Burton - bass, percussion, synth pad
- Paul Boldeau - backing vocals
- Phebe Edwards - backing vocals
- LaDonna Harley-Peters – backing vocals
- Wired Strings
  - Jenny Sacha – violin
  - Gillon Cameron - violin
  - Anna Croad - violin
  - Sally Jackson - violin
  - Patrick Kieman - violin
  - Eleanor Mathieson violin
  - Kotono Sato - violin
  - Debbie Widdup – violin
  - Emma Owens – viola
  - Nzomi Cohen – viola
  - Rosie Danvers – cello, string arrangements
  - Bryony James – cello
  - Richard Pryce – double bass

Technical

- Brian Burton (As Danger Mouse) - production
- Inflo - production
- Richard Woodcraft – engineering
- Todd Monfalcone – engineering

== Charts ==
Weekly chart performance for "Cold Little Heart"
Chart (2017)	Peak position
US Rock & Alternative Airplay (Billboard)	47

== Certifications ==
Certifications for "Cold Little Heart"
Region	Certification	Certified units/sales
Brazil (Pro-Música Brasil)	Platinum	60,000^{‡}
Denmark (IFPI Danmark)	Platinum	90,000^{‡}
Italy (FIMI)	Gold	50,000^{‡}
New Zealand (RMNZ)	2× Platinum	60,000^{‡}
Norway (IFPI Norway)	Gold	30,000^{‡}
Poland (ZPAV)	Platinum	50,000^{‡}
Portugal (AFP)	Platinum	10,000^{‡}
Spain (Promusicae)	Platinum	60,000^{‡}
United Kingdom (BPI)	Platinum	600,000^{‡}
United States (RIAA)	Platinum	1,000,000^{‡}
^{‡} Sales+streaming figures based on certification alone.
