= John McKeown (disambiguation) =

John McKeown is an English musician.

John McKeown may also refer to:

- John McKeown (rugby league) (1926–2006), English rugby player
- John McKeown (footballer) (born 1981), Scottish footballer
- Jackie McKeown (John McKeown, born 1971), Scottish singer with The Yummy Fur
- John McKeown (Brooklyn) (born 1855), member of the 118th New York State Legislature
