= Pigalle Club =

Club and venue in central London

Coordinates: 51.5095°N 0.1350°W

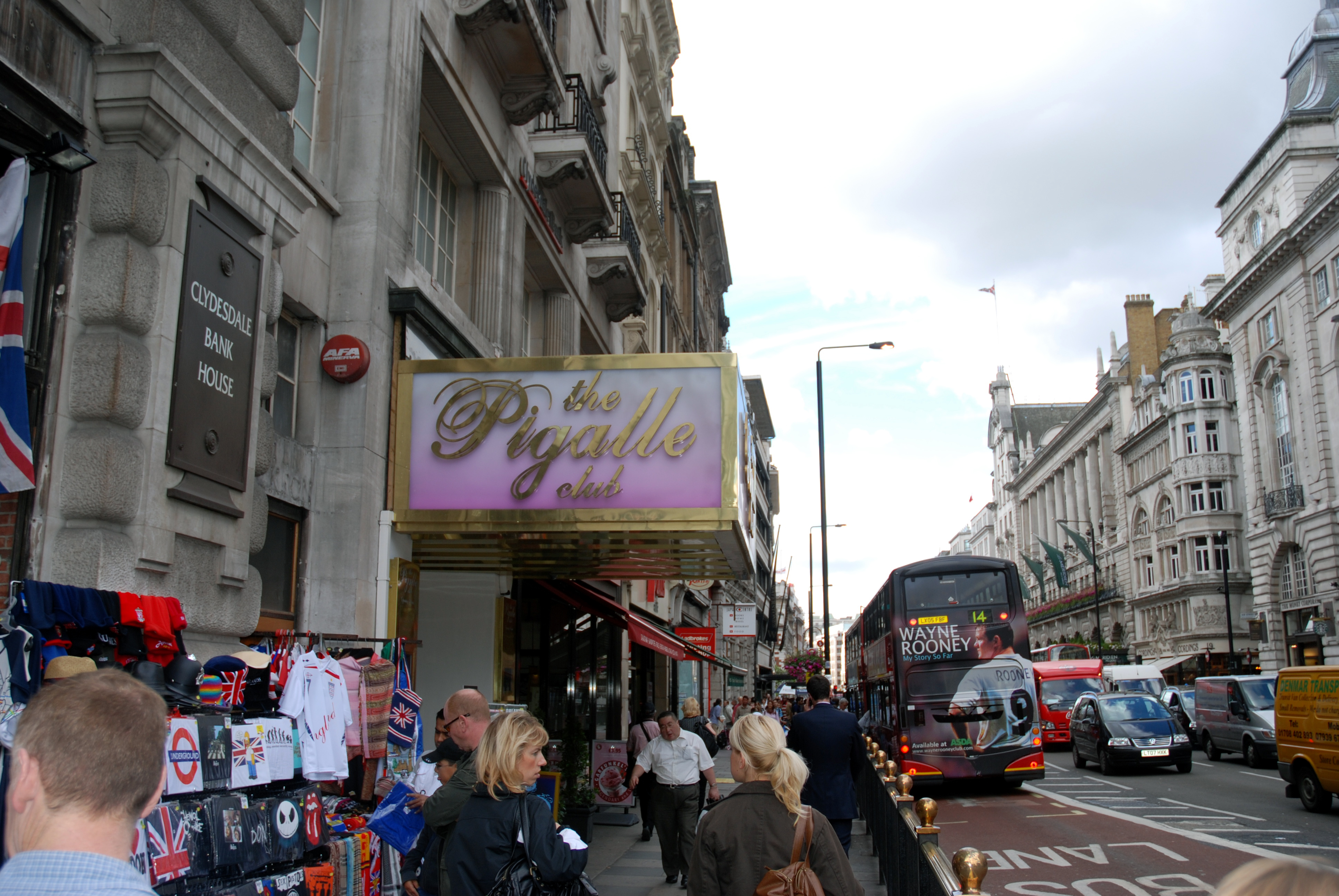
- Interactive map of Pigalle Club
- Address: 215 Piccadilly; London W1J 9HN
- Location: Piccadilly, London, UK
- Owner: Vince Power
- Capacity: 400
- Events: jazz, soul, pop, cabaret

Construction
- Closed: 2012

The Pigalle Club was a supper club and live music venue in Piccadilly, in the West End area of Central London. It was owned by John Vincent Power. Dave West also owned shares in the Pigalle Club.

== Background ==
Originally located at a nearby site at 196 Piccadilly, the club re-opened in April 2006 at 215–217 Piccadilly, St James, W1J 9HN. Designed by Stephen Donald and furnished by Shaun Clarkson, the sophisticated Pigalle Club was inspired by 1940s aesthetics. It offered fine dining and live musical entertainment, with tables clustered around the stage. The 400-capacity venue hosted artists performing jazz, and occasionally soul and pop music, alongside cabaret and burlesque acts. The new venue only lasted 6 years, before closing down in 2012.

== Acts ==
The Beatles played a concert at the Pigalle on 21 April 1963. Shirley Bassey's performance at the club on 12 September 1965 was recorded and released on the live album Shirley Bassey at the Pigalle the same year. Other acts that performed at the venue included Yana, Peggy Lee, Romeo Z (resident band), Sammy Davis Jr, Boy George, Duffy, Eartha Kitt, Sinéad O'Connor, John McKeown, Basia, Horace Andy, Brian Kennedy, Nerina Pallot and Immodesty Blaize.

== Later years and closure ==
In 2007, the venue was featured in the third series of Britain's Next Top Model.

The Pigalle Club closed down in 2012. It was replaced by a new establishment in 2014, Warewolf, which soon also ceased operating.

== See also ==
- List of supper clubs
