= Fudge (album) =

Studio album by Michael Kiwanuka
- Released: 23 October 2026
- Genre: Psychedelic soul
- Length: 61:08
- Label: Polydor
- Producers: Joe Connell; Michael Kiwanuka; Dom Monks

Michael Kiwanuka chronology
Small Changes (2024)	Fudge (2026)

Singles from Kiwanuka
- 1. "Summer Clothes" Released: 2 October 2026; 2. "Sing" Released: 16 October 2026

Fudge (stylised in all caps) is the fifth album by the English singer-songwriter Michael Kiwanuka. It was released on 23 October 2026, a month after its announcement. It was written "almost concurrently" with his previous album, Small Changes. It is the first album released after Kiwanuka had a major stroke earlier in the year, and also is the first since 2012's Home Again without his usual production team of Danger Mouse and Inflo.

== Background ==
Unlike his previous albums, which were produced with his regular collaborators Danger Mouse and Inflo, Fudge was primarily self-produced by Kiwanuka, with additional production by Dom Monks and string arrangements by Rosie Danvers.

Kiwanuka developed the album in a small, one-room studio near his home in Southampton, which he and his collaborators named Dreamers. The album's creative direction was influenced by Kiwanuka's desire to work without the expectations associated with his previous records. He cited The Beatles' Rubber Soul, Neil Young's On the Beach, Frank Ocean's Blonde, and Shuggie Otis's Inspiration Information among his musical inspirations. He also drew inspiration from an interview with jazz pianist Chick Corea about trusting one's own artistic judgement. The title Fudge reflected the playful, childlike approach to creativity that Kiwanuka sought to embrace during the recording process.

The album's release was preceded first by the single "Summer Clothes," released on 2 October 2026. Kiwanuka stated that his inspiration for the song was from an interview with jazz pianist Chick Corea. A music video, directed by Yout, was released along with the single. A second single, "Sing" was released on 16 October 2026, with a music video filmed in Morocco in early summer 2025, weeks before his illness.

== Reception ==
Professional ratings
Aggregate scores
Source	Rating
Metacritic	82/100
Review scores
Source	Rating
AllMusic	4/5 stars
Clash	8/10
Exclaim!	7/10
The Guardian	4/5 stars
The Independent	4/5 stars
The Line of Best Fit	7/10
Mojo	4/5 stars
NME	4/5 stars
Uncut	7/10 stars

Fudge was released to positive reviews from most critics. On review aggregator Metacritic, the album has a rating of 82 out of 100, indicating "Universal Acclaim".

== Track listing ==
All tracks are written by Michael Kiwanuka, with other writers noted.

Fudge track listing
No.	Title	Writer(s)	Length
1.	"Summer Clothes"		4:25
2.	"California"		5:28
3.	"Just Another Moment"	Alex Bonfanti; Joe Connell; Graham Godfrey; Michael Jablonka; Steve Pringle	6:27
4.	"Drowning in Your Heart"		4:17
5.	"Love in My Heart"	Bonfanti; Connell; Godfrey; Jablonka; Pringle	7:09
6.	"Across the Sky"		3:21
7.	"Stars"		5:10
8.	"You Sent Me Flying"		4:57
9.	"Move in My Direction"		4:17
10.	"Steve's Paradise"	Bonfanti; Connell; Jablonka; Pringle	6:00
11.	"Sing"		6:11
12.	"Swings and Roundabouts"		3:26
Total length:			61:08

== Personnel ==
Credits are adapted from Tidal.

=== Musicians ===
- Michael Kiwanuka – vocals (all tracks), electric guitar (tracks 1, 2, 4, 7), synth bass (1, 7, 8, 11), background vocals (2, 3, 6–8, 10, 11), 12-string acoustic guitar (3, 5, 6), string arrangement (4, 6, 9), bass (7, 8, 11, 12), acoustic guitar (7, 11, 12), nylon-string guitar (8–10), xylophone (11)
- Joe Connell – drums (1, 8–12), keyboards (1, 10); background vocals, percussion (1); piano (2–5, 7, 11, 12), organ (2), electric guitar (3, 7, 8), Hammond B3 (3, 10), 12-string acoustic guitar (3); synth bass, timpani (5); Rhodes (8), electric bass guitar (10, 11), acoustic guitar (10), tambourine (11)
- Simone Daley Richards – background vocals (1, 3, 5); choir arrangement, vocal arrangement (1); choir vocals (4)
- Emily Holligan – background vocals (1, 3, 5)
- Mikel Bryan-Taylor – background vocals (1, 4)
- Desrine Ewart – background vocals (1), choir vocals (4)
- Searah Hall – background vocals (1), choir vocals (4)
- Rosie Danvers – string arrangement (1, 5, 7, 11)
- Bryony James – cello (1, 5, 7, 11)
- Victoria Harrild – cello (1, 5, 7, 11)
- Richard Pryce – double bass (1, 5, 7, 11)
- Bryony Mycroft – viola (1, 5, 7, 11)
- Meghan Cassidy – viola (1, 5, 7, 11)
- Nick Barr – viola (1, 5), cello (7, 11)
- Charis Jenson – violin (1, 5, 7, 11)
- Ellie Stanford – violin (1, 5, 7, 11)
- Jenny Sacha – violin (1, 5, 7, 11)
- Michael Trainor – violin (1, 5, 7, 11)
- Natalia Bonner – violin (1, 5, 7, 11)
- Natalie Klouda – violin (1, 5, 7, 11)
- Patrick Kiernan – violin (1, 5, 7, 11)
- Stephen Cavey – violin (1, 5, 7, 11)
- Steve Morris – violin (1, 5, 7, 11)
- Zahra Benyounes – violin (1, 5, 7, 11)
- Billy Boothroyd – background vocals (1)
- JC Henry – background vocals (1)
- Margo Muzangaza – background vocals (1)
- Nicholas Norman – background vocals (1)
- Patrice Copeland – background vocals (1)
- Philly Lopez – background vocals (1)
- Roo Savill – background vocals (1)
- Sarah Farrell – background vocals (1)
- Tor Hillis – background vocals (1)
- Wilson Atie – background vocals (1)
- Katt Newlon – cello (2–6, 8, 9), string arrangement (4, 6, 9)
- Henry Rankin – string arrangement (2–4, 6, 9), viola (2, 3, 5, 8), violin (4, 6, 9)
- Harry Fausing Smith – violin (2, 3, 5, 8), string arrangement (4–6, 8, 9), viola (4, 6, 9)
- Graham Godfrey – drums (2, 3, 5), tambourine (2), claves (3)
- Michael Jablonka – electric guitar (2, 3, 5), synth bass (2), electric bass guitar (10)
- Alex Bonfanti – nylon-string guitar (2), synth bass (3), Hammond B3 (5), bass (10)
- Marianne Haynes – violin (2, 3, 8)
- Neil Cowley – Moog bass (2, 11), piano (2)
- Connie Maccall – background vocals (4)
- Mirabel Ukpabio – choir vocals (4)
- T Jae Cole – choir vocals (4)
- Wendi Ross – choir vocals (4)
- Steve Pringle – piano, Rhodes (5); Hammond B3, Wurlitzer organ (7); keyboards (10)
- Dom Monks – sleigh bells, tambourine (7); cymbals (8)
- Lewis Wright – drums (7)
- Alice Earll – violin (9)
- Delilah Johns – background vocals (10)
- Georgia Barnes – background vocals (10)
- Izzie Yardley – background vocals (10)

=== Technical ===
- Joe Connell – production (all tracks), engineering (1–7, 10–12), mixing (1–7, 12)
- Dom Monks – production (all tracks), engineering (1, 2, 4–12), mixing (8–11)
- Michael Kiwanuka – production (all tracks)
- Ben Baptie – engineering (2)
- Aidan Glover – engineering (7)
- Todd Monfalcone – additional engineering (1, 10–12)
- Matt Colton – mastering

== Charts ==
Chart performance for Fudge
Chart (2026)	Peak position
Austrian Albums (Ö3 Austria)	51
Belgian Albums (Ultratop Flanders)	3
Belgian Albums (Ultratop Wallonia)	8
Dutch Albums (Album Top 100)	4
French Albums (SNEP)	94
German Albums (Offizielle Top 100)	28
German Pop Albums (Offizielle Top 100)	17
Scottish Albums (Official Charts)	6
Swiss Albums (Schweizer Hitparade)	13
UK Albums (Official Charts)	13
