= Love Hate =

Love Hate may refer to:

== Psychology ==
- Ambivalence, co-existing contradictory impulses, agony of ambivalence
- Love–hate relationship, relationship involving simultaneous or alternating emotions of love and hate
- Love and hate (psychoanalysis)
- Splitting (psychology), failure in a person's thinking to bring together both positive and negative qualities of the self and others into a cohesive, realistic whole

== Film and TV ==
- Love Hate (film), a 1971 French film
- Love/Hate (TV series), Irish TV drama
- Love + Hate (2005 film), drama film set in Northern England

== Music ==
- Love/Hate (band), American hard rock band
- Love/Hate (The-Dream album), 2007
- Love/Hate (Nine Black Alps album), 2007
- "Love/Hate", a song by Betty Blowtorch
- "Love/Hate", a song by Kelly Rowland from Simply Deep
- "Hate/Love", a song by Eskimo Callboy

== See also ==
- Love and Hate (disambiguation)
- Love Hate Love, a 1971 American made-for-television drama film
