= Small Changes (album) =

Studio album by Michael Kiwanuka
- Released: 22 November 2024
- Genre: Psychedelic soul
- Length: 40:18
- Labels: Polydor; Interscope
- Producers: Danger Mouse; Inflo

Michael Kiwanuka chronology
Kiwanuka (2019)	Small Changes (2024)	Fudge (2026)

Singles from Small Changes
- 1. "Floating Parade" Released: 10 July 2024; 2. "Lowdown (Part I) / Lowdown (Part II)" Released: 12 September 2024; 3. "The Rest of Me" Released: 3 October 2024

Small Changes is the fourth studio album by English singer-songwriter Michael Kiwanuka. It was released by Polydor Records and Interscope Records on 22 November 2024 to widespread critical acclaim. The album is Kiwanuka's third consecutive project produced by Danger Mouse and Inflo. It was preceded by the release of three singles, "Floating Parade", "Lowdown (Part I)" / "Lowdown (Part II)", and "The Rest of Me".

== Critical reception ==
Professional ratings
Aggregate scores
Source	Rating
Metacritic	83/100
Review scores
Source	Rating
AllMusic	3.5/5 stars
Clash	8/10
DIY	4.5/5 stars
The Independent	4/5 stars
The Guardian	5/5 stars
The Line of Best Fit	8/10
Mojo	4/5 stars
NME	4/5 stars
The Observer	5/5 stars
Pitchfork	7.0/10
Uncut	4.5/5 stars

Small Changes received positive reviews from music critics. At Metacritic, which assigns a normalized rating out of 100 to reviews from mainstream critics, the album received an average score of 83, based on 17 reviews.

== Track listing ==
All tracks are written by Michael Kiwanuka, Brian Burton, and Dean Josiah Cover, except "Four Long Years", written by Kiwanuka and Burton.

Small Changes track listing
No.	Title	Length
1.	"Floating Parade"	3:50
2.	"Small Changes"	4:06
3.	"One and Only"	4:32
4.	"Rebel Soul"	3:28
5.	"Lowdown (Part I)"	3:16
6.	"Lowdown (Part II)"	2:40
7.	"Follow Your Dreams"	3:41
8.	"Live For Your Love"	2:29
9.	"Stay By My Side"	3:44
10.	"The Rest of Me"	3:51
11.	"Four Long Years"	4:41
Total length:		40:18

== Personnel ==
=== Musicians ===
- Michael Kiwanuka – vocals (tracks 1–5, 7–11), acoustic guitar (1, 3, 7), bass guitar (1, 2, 5–11), electric guitar (2, 3, 5–11), backing vocals (5, 9), Wurlitzer (9), piano (9), drums (11)
- Inflo – drums (tracks 1–10), piano (1–4, 6–11), backing vocals (1–4, 7–10), keyboards (2–10), Rhodes (1, 10), synthesizer (2–4, 6–10), bass guitar (3)
- Rosie Danvers – string arrangements
- Pete Anthony – orchestra conductor
- Alecia Chakour – backing vocals (tracks 1–4, 7, 8)
- Stevvi Alexander – backing vocals (tracks 1–3, 7, 8, 10)
- LaVance Colley – backing vocals (tracks 1–3, 7, 8)
- Jimmy Jam – organ (tracks 3, 4), Hammond organ (5)
- Sharlotte Gibson – backing vocals (tracks 3, 8, 10)
- Pino Palladino – bass guitar (track 4)
- James Payne – electric slide guitar (track 5)
- Emily Holligan – backing vocals (tracks 5, 9)
- Simone Richards – backing vocals (tracks 5, 9)
- James Gadson – drums (track 7)
- Brian Burton – drums (track 9), synthesizer programming (11)

=== Technical ===
- Danger Mouse – production
- Inflo – production
- Matt Colton – mastering
- Richard Woodcraft – mixing, engineering
- Todd Monfalcone – engineering
- Kennie Takahashi – engineering
- Tom Hardistry – strings engineering, strings recording
- Chandler Harrod – strings recording
- Alex Kalteziotis – engineering assistance
- Brian Bair – engineering assistance
- Dave Clarke – engineering assistance
- Emily Reeves – engineering assistance
- Emma Marks – engineering assistance
- Jacob Spitzer – engineering assistance
- Max Anstruther – engineering assistance
- Noah Rastegar – engineering assistance
- Rich Wheeler – engineering assistance
- Ryan Nelson – engineering assistance
- Rich Wheeler – strings engineering assistance
- Ryan Nelson – strings engineering assistance
- Dave Clarke – strings engineering assistance
- Brian Bair – strings engineering assistance
- Ben Baptie – additional engineering (tracks 7, 9)

=== Visuals ===
- Yout – art
- Marcus Grey – photography, creative direction
- Jeremy Ngatho Cole – creative direction, design
- Jude Amponsah – design

== Charts ==
Weekly chart performance for Small Changes
Chart (2024–2025)	Peak position
Austrian Albums (Ö3 Austria)	15
Belgian Albums (Ultratop Flanders)	5
Belgian Albums (Ultratop Wallonia)	32
Dutch Albums (Album Top 100)	2
French Albums (SNEP)	53
German Albums (Offizielle Top 100)	11
Greek Albums (IFPI)	88
Irish Albums (IRMA)	44
New Zealand Albums (RMNZ)	40
Portuguese Albums (AFP)	104
Scottish Albums (Official Charts)	1
Spanish Albums (PROMUSICAE)	56
Swiss Albums (Schweizer Hitparade)	6
UK Albums (Official Charts)	2
