= Phebe Edwards =

English singer and songwriter

- Genres: R&B; Soul; Urban; pop
- Occupations: Singer; songwriter
- Instruments: Vocals; piano
- Years active: 2008–present
- Website: phebeedwards.com

Phebe Edwards is an English singer and songwriter. She appeared in MJ THE MUSICAL UK original cast on the West End, playing the role of Katherine Jackson 2024 - 2025. She has appeared as a studio backing vocalist for a number of artists such as Stormzy, Craig David, London Grammar, Michael Kiwanuka, Donna Summer and Leona Lewis. In 2006 she sang alongside James Brown at the BBC Electric Proms. She has supported artists like Adele, Liam Gallagher, Bryan Ferry, Louisa Johnson, and Gabrielle. and has toured with Jessie J, Years & Years and Clean Bandit.

== Discography ==
=== Studio albums ===
Title	Album details
Pandora's Box of Love	Released: June 9, 2022; Format: Digital download, streaming

=== Singles ===
==== As lead artist ====
Title	Year	Album
"Inside of You"	2016	Non-album singles
"Gonna Make It"	2017	Non-album singles
"April Flowers"	2017	Non-album singles
"Space" (featuring Cameron Bloomfield)	2018	Pandoras Box of Love
"Get It Right" (featuring Mark Asari)	2018	Pandoras Box of Love
"Ain't Nothin' Going On But The Rent'" (with Kevin McKay)	2021	Non-album single

== Selected Background Vocals ==
Year	Album	Artist	UK charts
2009	Things Worth Fighting For	John McKeown	
2016	Love & Hate	Michael Kiwanuka	1
2017	Gang Signs & Prayer	Stormzy	1
2015	I Am	Leona Lewis	12
2018	The Time is Now	Craig David	2
2019	Real Life	Emeli Sandé	6
2021	Californian Soil	London Grammar	1
