= Things Worth Fighting For =

Studio album by John McKeown
- Released: 2009
- Recorded: RAK Studios, Regent's Park, London
- Genres: Rock, folk
- Length: 41:07
- Label: Beatroute Records
- Producer: Elliott Randall

Things Worth Fighting For is the debut album by solo artist John McKeown. The album was released digitally by Beatroute Records on the 28 September 2009.

The album was produced by Elliott Randall of Steely Dan fame.

== Track listing ==
1. "Will You Be Mine"
2. "Can't Be Right"
3. "Touch You"
4. "Fade Away"
5. "Candy Girl"
6. "Dream on Valentine"
7. "Things Worth Fighting For"
8. "Up Where You Belong"
9. "Bleed"
10. "For You"

== Album credits ==
- Produced by Elliott Randall and John McKeown
- Recorded at RAK Studios, London
- Strings & Horns recorded at SARM Studios, London
- String arrangements by Pete Murray
- Horn arrangement by Steve Sidwell
- Engineered by Wes Maebe
- Mixed by Elliott Randall & Wes Maebe
- Mastered by Wes Maebe at GHQ Sonic Cuisine
- Assisted by: Robbie Nelson & Tim Goalen

== Session musicians ==
The following musicians performed on the album.

- Adam Phillips (Guitars)
- Arnulf Lindner (Bass)
- Reverend Bazil Meade (Backing Vocals)
- Elliott Randall (Guitars, Backing Vocals)
- Hugh Wilkinson (Percussion)
- Jenn Potter (Backing Vocals)
- Joshua Makhene (Backing Vocals)
- Luyanda Tezile (Backing Vocals)
- Hugh Wilkinson (Percussion)
- Pete Murray (Piano)
- Peter Zorn (Flute)
- Phebe Edwards (Backing Vocals)
- Pinse Saul (Backing Vocals)
- Ralph Salmins (Drums)
- Tshepo Rakobo (Backing Vocals)
- Zalika King (Backing Vocals)
