= Kiwanuka (album) =

Studio album by Michael Kiwanuka
- Released: 1 November 2019
- Genre: Psychedelic soul
- Length: 51:13
- Label: Polydor; Interscope
- Producer: Danger Mouse; Inflo

Michael Kiwanuka chronology
| Love & Hate (2016) | Kiwanuka (2019) | Small Changes (2024) |

Singles from Kiwanuka
- 1. "You Ain't the Problem" Released: 13 August 2019; 2. "Hero" Released: 10 October 2019; 3. "Piano Joint (This Kind of Love)" Released: 16 October 2019; 4. "Light" Released: 19 June 2020; 5. "Rolling" Released: 2020

Kiwanuka is the third studio album by English singer-songwriter Michael Kiwanuka. It was released on 1 November 2019 through Polydor and Interscope Records. The album won the 2020 Mercury Prize, and was nominated for Best Rock Album at the 63rd Grammy Awards.

== Critical reception ==
Professional ratings
Aggregate scores
| Source | Rating |
|---|---|
| AnyDecentMusic? | 8.5/10 |
| Metacritic | 89/100 |
Review scores
| Source | Rating |
| AllMusic | 4/5 stars |
| Chicago Tribune | 3.5/4 stars |
| The Daily Telegraph | 5/5 stars |
| The Guardian | 5/5 stars |
| The Independent | 4/5 stars |
| NME | 5/5 stars |
| Pitchfork | 7.5/10 |
| Q | 5/5 stars |
| Rolling Stone | 3.5/5 stars |
| The Times | 4/5 stars |

On the review aggregator website Metacritic, Kiwanuka has a score of 89 out of 100 based on 21 reviews, indicating "universal acclaim". Aggregator AnyDecentMusic? gave it 8.5 out of 10, based on their assessment of the critical consensus.

Dave Simpson of The Guardian hailed Kiwanuka as a "bold, expansive, heartfelt, sublime album" and one of the best of the decade, while Dorian Lynskey of Q called it a "compassionate, career-defining masterpiece". In her review for NME, Elizabeth Aubrey highlighted the personal nature of its lyrics, commending it as "a daring leap of self-affirmation." Neil McCormick of The Daily Telegraph described it as "an album in which a troubled spirit seeks the relief of music to mesmerising and charged effect." In a year-end essay for Slate, Ann Powers cited Kiwanuka as proof that the album format is not dead but rather undergoing a "metamorphosis", with artists such as Kiwanuka utilizing the concept album through the culturally-relevant autobiographical narratives, which in this case is a "song cycle alchemizing violence through compassion".

The album won the Mercury Prize 2020. It was the third time in his career he had been nominated following nominations for Home Again and Love & Hate but the first time he had won.

=== Accolades ===
Accolades for Kiwanuka
| Publication | List | Rank |
|---|---|---|
| Afisha Daily (Russia) | The Best Foreign Albums of 2019 | 6 |
| Albumism | The 50 Best Albums of 2019 | 6 |
| AllMusic | Best of 2019 | —N/a |
| American Songwriter | Top 25 Albums (and 25 More That We Loved) of 2019 | —N/a |
| BBC Radio 6 Music | Albums of the Year 2019 | 3 |
| Chicago Tribune | Best rock-pop-rap albums of 2019 | 4 |
| Clash | Albums of the Year 2019 | 9 |
| Double J | The 50 best albums of 2019 | 16 |
| The Economist | The best albums of 2019 | —N/a |
| Gigwise | 51 Best Albums of 2019 | 5 |
| God Is in the TV | GIITTV Album of the Year Poll Results 2019 | 2 |
| Good Morning America | 50 of the best albums of 2019 | 2 |
| The Guardian | The 50 best albums of 2019 | 12 |
| Houston Chronicle | Andrew Dansby's albums of 2019 | 6 |
| The Independent | The 50 best albums of 2019 | 18 |
| The Line of Best Fit | The Best Albums of 2019 Ranked | 20 |
| Mondo Sonoro (Spain) | The best international albums of 2019 | 7 |
| musicOMH | Top 50 Albums Of 2019 | 4 |
| The New York Times (Jon Pareles) | Top 50 Albums Of 2019 | 8 |
| NME | The 50 best albums of 2019 | 8 |
| No Ripcord | The 50 Best Albums of 2019 | 11 |
| PopMatters | The 70 Best Albums of 2019 | 18 |
| Under the Radar | Top 100 Albums of 2019 | 34 |

== Track listing ==
All tracks are written by Michael Kiwanuka, Brian Burton, and Dean Josiah Cover.

Kiwanuka track listing
| No. | Title | Length |
|---|---|---|
| 1. | "You Ain't the Problem" | 4:09 |
| 2. | "Rolling" | 2:51 |
| 3. | "I've Been Dazed" | 4:25 |
| 4. | "Piano Joint (This Kind of Love) (Intro)" | 2:18 |
| 5. | "Piano Joint (This Kind of Love)" | 3:51 |
| 6. | "Another Human Being" | 1:51 |
| 7. | "Living in Denial" | 3:31 |
| 8. | "Hero (Intro)" | 1:20 |
| 9. | "Hero" | 3:19 |
| 10. | "Hard to Say Goodbye" | 7:05 |
| 11. | "Final Days" | 4:10 |
| 12. | "Interlude (Loving the People)" | 2:42 |
| 13. | "Solid Ground" | 3:53 |
| 14. | "Light" | 5:48 |
| Total length: | | 51:13 |

== Personnel ==
Credits adapted from digital and printed liner notes.

Musicians

- Michael Kiwanuka – vocals (all tracks), acoustic guitar (1, 3, 8–10, 14), electric guitar (2–5, 7–11, 13, 14), bass (1–5, 7–11, 13, 14), organ, piano and synthesizer (13), percussion (1)
- Inflo – drums (1–5, 7–14), percussion (1–4), piano (1–5, 10–12, 14), synthesizer (2–5, 13, 14), organ (2, 8, 9), keyboards (3, 4, 7), programming (4, 8), electric guitar (1), background vocals (1–5, 7–11, 13, 14), vocals (2, 11)
- Kadeem Clarke – synthesizer (1, 7, 11), keyboards (1), piano (6, 10), Wurlitzer electric piano (11)
- Danger Mouse – programming (4, 6, 8, 9, 11, 13, 14), percussion and tambourine (1), electric guitar (3), keyboards (7)
- Jean Kelly – harp (5, 6, 10)
- Dizzy Daniel Moorehead – saxophone (3, 10, 11)
- George Hogg – trumpet (10)
- Chloe Vincent – flute (10)
- Nathan Allen – percussion (10)
- James Casey, Alecia Chakour, Jasmine Muhammed, Saundra Williams – background vocals (3, 10, 11)
- Paul Boldeau, Yolanda Greaves, LaDonna Harley Peters – background vocals (3, 14)
- Wired Strings

- Natalia Bonner – violin (1, 3, 5, 9)
- Zara Benyounes – violin (1, 5, 9, 13)
- Sally Jackson, Patrick Kiernan, Steve Morris – violin (3, 5, 10, 11, 14)
- Anna Croad – violin (3, 10)
- Stephanie Cavey – violin (3)
- Deborah Widdup – violin (5, 10, 11, 14)
- Eleanor Mathieson – violin (5, 10)
- Gillon Cameron, Helen Hathorn, Hayley Pomfrett, Kotono Sato, Ellie Stanford – violin (5, 11, 14)
- Jenny Sacha – violin (10, 13)
- Sarah Sexton – violin (10)
- Nick Barr – viola (1, 5, 8, 11, 13, 14)
- Bruce White – viola (3)
- Fiona Leggat, Emma Owens – viola (5, 10, 11, 14)
- Rosie Danvers – cello (1, 3, 8, 11, 14), string arrangements (1, 3, 5, 6, 8–11, 13, 14)
- Bryony James – cello (5, 11, 14)
- Richard Pryce – double bass (5, 11, 14)

Technical

- Danger Mouse – producer (1, 3, 4, 7–9, 11, 13, 14)
- Inflo – producer (all tracks), recording engineer (12), mixer (4, 6, 12)
- Kennie Takahashi – recording engineer (1–5, 7–11, 13, 14), mixer (1, 7, 10)
- Tom Campbell – assistant recording engineer (1–3, 5, 7–9, 11, 13, 14), recording engineer (4, 6), strings recording engineer (10)
- Richard Woodcraft – mixer (2, 3, 5, 8–11, 13, 14), strings recording engineer (1, 3, 8, 9, 11, 13, 14), vocal engineer (7)
- Matt Colton – mastering engineer

== Charts ==
=== Weekly charts ===
Weekly chart performance for Kiwanuka
| Chart (2019) | Peak position |
|---|---|
| Australian Albums (ARIA) | 39 |
| Austrian Albums (Ö3 Austria) | 31 |
| Belgian Albums (Ultratop Flanders) | 4 |
| Belgian Albums (Ultratop Wallonia) | 56 |
| Canadian Albums (Billboard) | 73 |
| Dutch Albums (Album Top 100) | 6 |
| Finnish Albums (Suomen virallinen lista) | 25 |
| French Albums (SNEP) | 31 |
| German Albums (Offizielle Top 100) | 23 |
| Irish Albums (IRMA) | 11 |
| Italian Albums (FIMI) | 79 |
| New Zealand Albums (RMNZ) | 37 |
| Norwegian Albums (VG-lista) | 12 |
| Polish Albums (ZPAV) | 23 |
| Portuguese Albums (AFP) | 13 |
| Scottish Albums (OCC) | 2 |
| Spanish Albums (PROMUSICAE) | 27 |
| Swedish Albums (Sverigetopplistan) | 59 |
| Swiss Albums (Schweizer Hitparade) | 8 |
| UK Albums (OCC) | 2 |
| US Billboard 200 | 142 |
| US Top Rock Albums (Billboard) | 23 |

=== Year-end charts ===
Annual chart performance for Kiwanuka
| Chart | Year | Position |
|---|---|---|
| Belgian Albums (Ultratop Flanders) | 2019 | 170 |
| Belgian Albums (Ultratop Flanders) | 2020 | 86 |
| UK Albums (OCC) | 2020 | 92 |

== Certifications ==
Kiwanuka sales certifications
| Region | Certification | Certified units/sales |
|---|---|---|
| United Kingdom (BPI) | Gold | 100,000^{‡} |
^{‡} Sales+streaming figures based on certification alone.
