= Between Love and Hate =

Between Love and Hate may refer to:

- Between Love and Hate (1993 film), an American television film
- Between Love and Hate (2006 film), a South Korean film
- "Between Love & Hate", a song by The Strokes from the album Room on Fire

== See also ==
- Entre el amor y el odio (English: Between Love and Hatred), a Mexican telenovela
