= Love and Hate: The Natural History of Behavior Patterns =

Book by Irenäus Eibl-Eibesfeldt

- Author: Irenäus Eibl-Eibesfeldt
- Original title: Liebe und Hass: Zur Naturgeschichte elementarer Verhaltensweisen
- Publication date: 1970

Love and Hate: The Natural History of Behavior Patterns (German: Liebe und Hass: Zur Naturgeschichte elementarer Verhaltensweisen) is a 1970 book by the ethologist Irenäus Eibl-Eibesfeldt.

Love and Hate was reviewed in Current Anthropology.
