= John McKeown =

British singer

- Genres: Rock, Folk
- Occupation(s): Musician, vocalist
- Instrument(s): Vocals, guitars
- Years active: 2007–present
- Labels: Beatroute
- Website: John McKeown's Official Website

John McKeown is a solo artist based in London, England, signed to Beatroute Records. McKeown previously fronted rock group, Hero. After a European tour with Stereophonics and a number of tour dates in Los Angeles, Hero disbanded. John McKeown chose to pursue a solo career at the end of 2008.

At the start of 2009 McKeown started recording his debut album Things Worth Fighting For with Elliott Randall producing. The first single "Fade Away" was released by Beatroute Records on 14 September 2009. The digital single was accompanied by the b-side "These are the Times". Things Worth Fighting For became available on 28 September 2009. Both the single and album were limited to digital releases.

John McKeown launched Things Worth Fighting For with an exclusive showcase at The Pigalle Club in Picadilly on 10 September 2009. He was joined on stage by Elliott Randall and London Community Gospel Choir founder, Reverend Bazil Meade. The show was only open to press and invited VIPs but the performance was broadcast live on his website.

== Discography ==
Studio albums

- Things Worth Fighting For (Digital Release: 28 September 2009 – Beatroute Records)

Singles

- "Fade Away" (Digital Release: 14 September 2009 – Beatroute Records)
