= Love & Hate (Michael Kiwanuka album) =

Studio album by Michael Kiwanuka
- Released: 15 July 2016
- Studio: The Sound Factory (Los Angeles); Metropolis Studios (London); Miloco Studios (London); Chale Abbey (Isle of Wight); Panoramic Studios (Los Angeles); Seahorse Studios (Los Angeles); RAK Studios (London)
- Genre: Indie rock; folk rock
- Length: 52:49
- Label: Polydor (UK); Interscope (US)
- Producer: Danger Mouse; Inflo; Paul Butler

Michael Kiwanuka chronology
| Home Again (2012) | Love & Hate (2016) | Kiwanuka (2019) |

Michael Kiwanuka studio album chronology
| Home Again (2012) | Love & Hate (2016) | Kiwanuka (2019) |

Singles from Love & Hate
- 1. "Black Man in a White World" Released: 28 March 2016; 2. "Love & Hate" Released: 7 April 2016; 3. "One More Night" Released: 14 April 2016; 4. "Cold Little Heart" Released: 24 February 2017

Love & Hate is the second studio album by London-based singer-songwriter Michael Kiwanuka. The album was released on 15 July 2016 by Polydor Records in the UK and Interscope Records in the US. Upon its release, the album was met with widespread critical acclaim, with some publications listing it as one of the year's best albums.

== Background ==
The album is the follow-up record to Kiwanuka's 2012 Mercury Prize-nominated album Home Again. The album was produced by Danger Mouse, Inflo, and Paul Butler. Love & Hate also released four singles. The first single, "Black Man in a White World" was released on 28 March 2016, and was accompanied by a video directed by Hiro Murai. Three more singles followed, with "Love & Hate," and "One More Night" releasing later in 2016, and "Cold Little Heart" releasing in 2017.

== Usage in media ==
The song Cold Little Heart is also known for being the opening theme of the HBO television series Big Little Lies.

The song "Love & Hate" featured in various shows and films, including the series finale of the Netflix drama Seven Seconds, the Netflix docudrama When They See Us, the legal drama Suits (season 7, episode 8), Rosewood (season 1, episode 22), Animal Kingdom (season 3, episode 11), Dear White People (season 1, episode 5) and the movie The Tax Collector. In 2019, it was used in the Italian My Brother Chases Dinosaurs and in 2021, it was again used in an Italian production, Speravo de morì prima (episode 2, final scene and credits), based in the final season of footballer Francesco Totti at AS Roma.

The song "Black Man in a White World" is performed by John Clarence Stewart, in character as Simon Haynes, in "Zoey's Extraordinary Reckoning", the sixth episode of the second season of the musical comedy-drama series Zoey's Extraordinary Playlist.

The song "Rule the World" was featured in the Netflix series The Get Down and the HBO Max original series Hacks.

== Critical reception ==
Professional ratings
Aggregate scores
| Source | Rating |
|---|---|
| AnyDecentMusic? | 8.1/10 |
| Metacritic | 86/100 |
Review scores
| Source | Rating |
| AllMusic | 4/5 stars |
| The A.V. Club | A |
| Chicago Tribune | 4/4 stars |
| The Daily Telegraph | 5/5 stars |
| Entertainment Weekly | B+ |
| The Guardian | 4/5 stars |
| NME | 4/5 |
| Pitchfork | 6.9/10 |
| Q | 4/5 stars |
| The Times | 4/5 stars |

Upon its release, Love & Hate received widespread critical acclaim from music critics. At Metacritic, which assigns a normalized rating out of 100 to reviews from mainstream critics, the album has received an average score of 86, based on 23 reviews, indicating "universal acclaim". The Telegraph said "This is an album that sounds like a world of music in itself", while The Guardian called the album "the work of an artist coming into his own". Writing for Exclaim!, Ryan B. Patrick lauded Kiwanuka's "introspective study of himself and his standing in a post-millennial world".

=== Accolades ===
| Publication | Accolade | Year | Rank |
|---|---|---|---|
| American Songwriter | Top 50 Albums of 2016 | 2016 | 2 |
| Banquet Records | Albums of the Year | 2016 | 1 |
| BBC Radio 6 | Albums of the Year | 2016 | 4 |
| Chicago Tribune | Top Albums of 2016 | 2016 | 4 |
| GQ | 10 Best Albums of 2016 | 2016 | 7 |
| The Guardian | The Best Albums of 2016 | 2016 | 27 |
| Les Inrockuptibles | 50 Best Albums of 2016 | 2016 | 16 |
| Mojo | The 50 Best Albums of 2016 | 2016 | 2 |
| NME | NME's Albums of the Year 2016 | 2016 | 23 |
| Rough Trade | Albums of the Year | 2016 | 17 |

== Track listing ==
Love & Hate track listing
| No. | Title | Writer(s) | Length |
|---|---|---|---|
| 1. | "Cold Little Heart" | Michael Kiwanuka; Brian Burton; Dean Josiah Cover | 9:57 |
| 2. | "Black Man in a White World" | Kiwanuka; Cover | 4:18 |
| 3. | "Falling" | Kiwanuka; Burton | 4:16 |
| 4. | "Place I Belong" | Kiwanuka | 4:47 |
| 5. | "Love & Hate" | Kiwanuka; Burton; Cover | 7:07 |
| 6. | "One More Night" | Kiwanuka | 3:53 |
| 7. | "I'll Never Love" | Kiwanuka | 2:45 |
| 8. | "Rule the World" | Kiwanuka; Burton; Cover | 5:42 |
| 9. | "Father's Child" | Kiwanuka; Burton; Cover | 7:05 |
| 10. | "The Final Frame" | Kiwanuka; Burton; Cover | 4:59 |
| Total length: | | | 52:49 |

== Personnel ==
Adapted from the Love & Hate booklet.

Performers and musicians

- Michael Kiwanuka – vocals (all tracks); electric guitar (tracks 1, 3, 5, 6, 8); lead guitar (1, 3, 5, 8); acoustic guitar (1, 3, 5); guitar (2, 9, 10); bass (2, 3, 8, 10); piano (4, 9); backing vocals (5)
- Inflo – piano (1, 2, 5, 9, 10); drums (1, 5, 8–10); bass (5, 9); backing vocals (4, 5)
- Brian Burton – bass (1, 5); percussion (1, 3); synth pad (1); piano (3); organ (3, 5)
- Graham Godfrey – drums (2, 4, 7); percussion (2, 4, 5, 9); hand claps (2); backing vocals, (6); tape machine FX (7)
- Paul Butler – percussion (4, 6, 7); cello and trumpet (4); electric guitar, keys, drum machines and backing vocals (6); clavinet, Moog, piano and Yamaha CS-80 (7)
- Andy Parkin – violin (4)
- Miles James – electric guitar (4)
- Pete Randall – double bass (4); Fender bass VI (6, 7); backing vocals (4, 6, 7)
- Gary Plumley – flute (4); saxophone (4, 6)
- James Bateman – saxophone (6)
- Paul Boldeau, Phebe Edwards, LaDonna Harley-Peters – backing vocals (1–3, 5, 8, 9)
- Wired Strings (1–3, 5, 8–10)
  - Jenny Sacha – violin (1–3, 5)
  - Gillon Cameron, Anna Croad, Sally Jackson, Patrick Kieman, Eleanor Mathieson, Kotono Sato, Debbie Widdup – violin (1, 5)
  - Natalia Bonner – violin (2)
  - Kerenza Peacock – violin (3)
  - Emma Owens – viola (1, 2, 5)
  - Naomi Cohen – viola (1, 5)
  - Becky Jones – viola (3)
  - Rosie Danvers – cello (1–3, 5); string arrangements (1–3, 8–10)
  - Bryony James – cello (1, 5)
  - Richard Pryce – double bass (1, 5)
  - Huw White – string arrangements (5)

Technical

- Brian Burton (as Danger Mouse) – production (1, 3, 5, 7–10); vocal production (4)
- Inflo – production (1–3, 5, 8–10); strings production (3, 8, 9)
- Paul Butler – production, engineering and mixing (4, 6, 7); vocal production (4)
- Kennie Takahashi – engineering (all tracks, exc. 2, 6); mixing (3, 7, 8, 10)
- Richard Woodcraft – engineering (1, 2, 4, 5, 8, 9); strings engineering; mixing (all tracks, exc. 3, 7)
- Todd Monfalcone – engineering (1, 3–5, 7, 8, 10); mixing assistant (3, 7, 8, 10)
- Dave Granshaw – engineering (4, 6, 7)
- Jon McMullen – engineering (6, 7); mix engineering (4)
- Samur Khouja – engineering (7)
- Guy Davie – mastering

== Charts ==
=== Weekly charts ===
| Chart (2016) | Peak position |
|---|---|
| Australian Albums (ARIA) | 35 |
| Austrian Albums (Ö3 Austria) | 11 |
| Belgian Albums (Ultratop Flanders) | 9 |
| Belgian Albums (Ultratop Wallonia) | 26 |
| Dutch Albums (Album Top 100) | 8 |
| French Albums (SNEP) | 5 |
| German Albums (Offizielle Top 100) | 6 |
| Irish Albums (IRMA) | 15 |
| New Zealand Heatseekers Albums (RMNZ) | 4 |
| Scottish Albums (OCC) | 4 |
| Spanish Albums (Promusicae) | 47 |
| Swiss Albums (Schweizer Hitparade) | 4 |
| UK Albums (OCC) | 1 |
| UK Album Downloads (OCC) | 2 |
| UK R&B Albums (OCC) | 1 |
| US Billboard 200 | 170 |
| US Americana/Folk Albums (Billboard) | 3 |
| US Top R&B/Hip-Hop Albums (Billboard) | 13 |
| US Indie Store Album Sales (Billboard) | 11 |
| Chart (2019) | Peak position |
| Portuguese Albums (AFP) | 33 |
| Chart (2021) | Peak position |
| US Top Album Sales (Billboard) | 46 |

=== Year-end charts ===
| Chart (2016) | Position |
|---|---|
| Belgian Albums (Ultratop Flanders) | 108 |

| Chart (2020) | Position |
|---|---|
| Belgian Albums (Ultratop Flanders) | 177 |

== Certifications ==
| Region | Certification | Certified units/sales |
|---|---|---|
| Poland (ZPAV) | Platinum | 20,000^{‡} |
^{‡} Sales+streaming figures based on certification alone.
