= Michael Kiwanuka =

English singer-songwriter (born 1987)

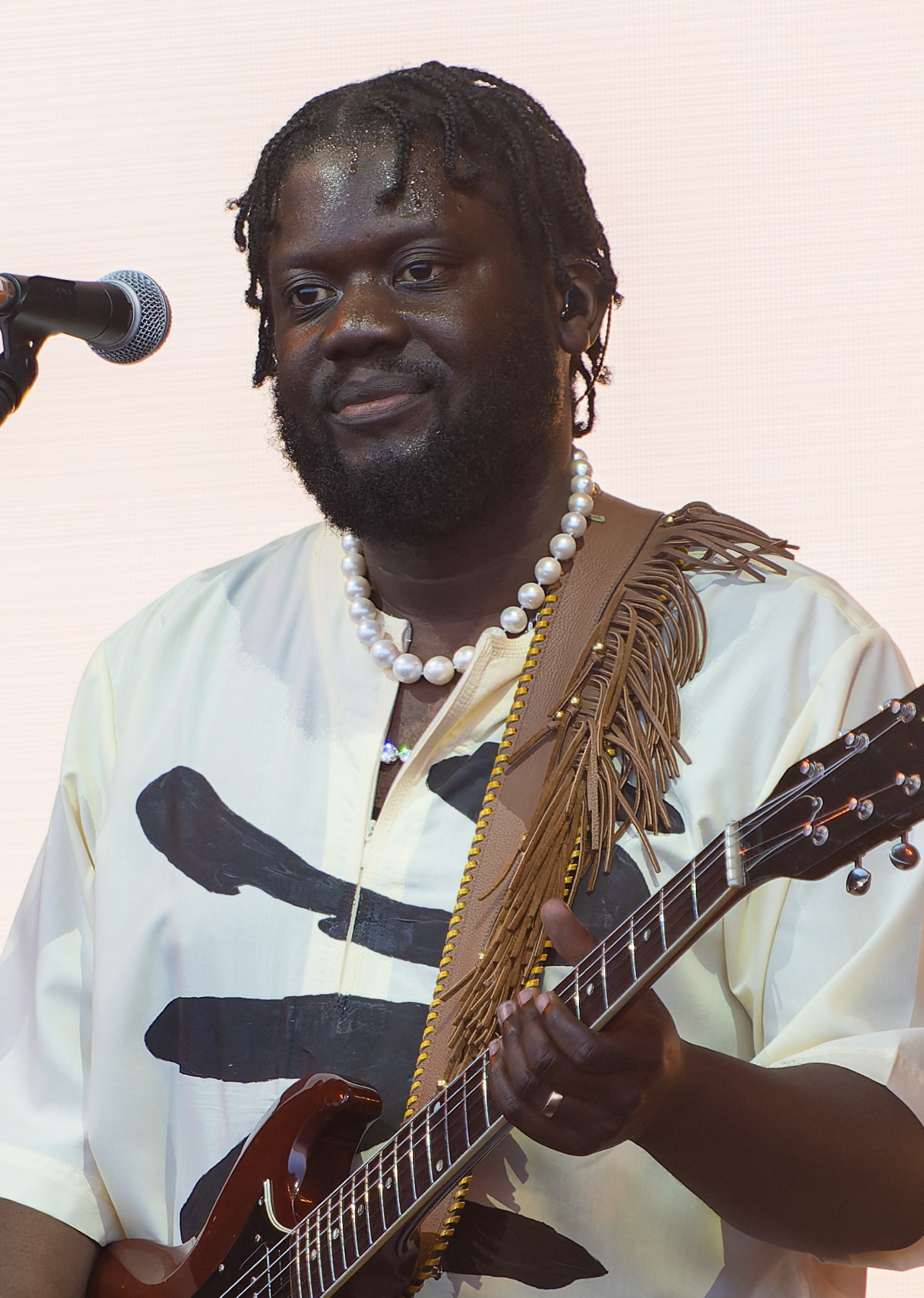
- Kiwanuka in 2024

Background information
- Born: 3 May 1987 (age 39); London, England
- Genres: Indie rock; folk rock; soul
- Occupations: Singer; songwriter; musician; record producer
- Instruments: Vocals; guitar; bass; keyboards
- Labels: Polydor; Communion
- Spouse: Charlotte Kiwanuka (m. 2016)
- Website: michaelkiwanuka.com

Michael Samuel Kiwanuka (born 3 May 1987) is a British singer-songwriter and record producer from London, England. He is currently signed to Polydor Records. His debut album, Home Again (2012), went gold in the United Kingdom, while his second album Love & Hate (2016) debuted at the top of the UK albums chart. He has been nominated for numerous honours, including Brit Awards, MTV Europe Music Awards, BBC Music Awards, and Grammy Awards. He won the BBC's Sound of... in 2012, and the Mercury Prize in 2020 for his third album, 2019's Kiwanuka. His fourth album, Small Changes, was released in November 2024. followed by Fudge in October 2026.

== Early life ==
Michael Samuel Kiwanuka was born in the Muswell Hill area of London on 3 May 1987, the son of Deborah and Michael Kiwanuka. His parents were Ugandan immigrants who had escaped Idi Amin's regime. He graduated from Fortismere School in 2005, then studied at the University of Westminster's School of Media, Arts, and Design.

== Career ==
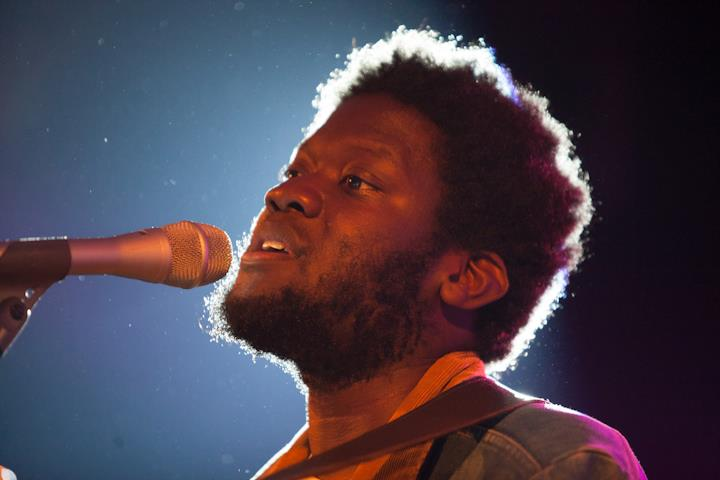
Kiwanuka performing at the 2012 Montreux Jazz Festival

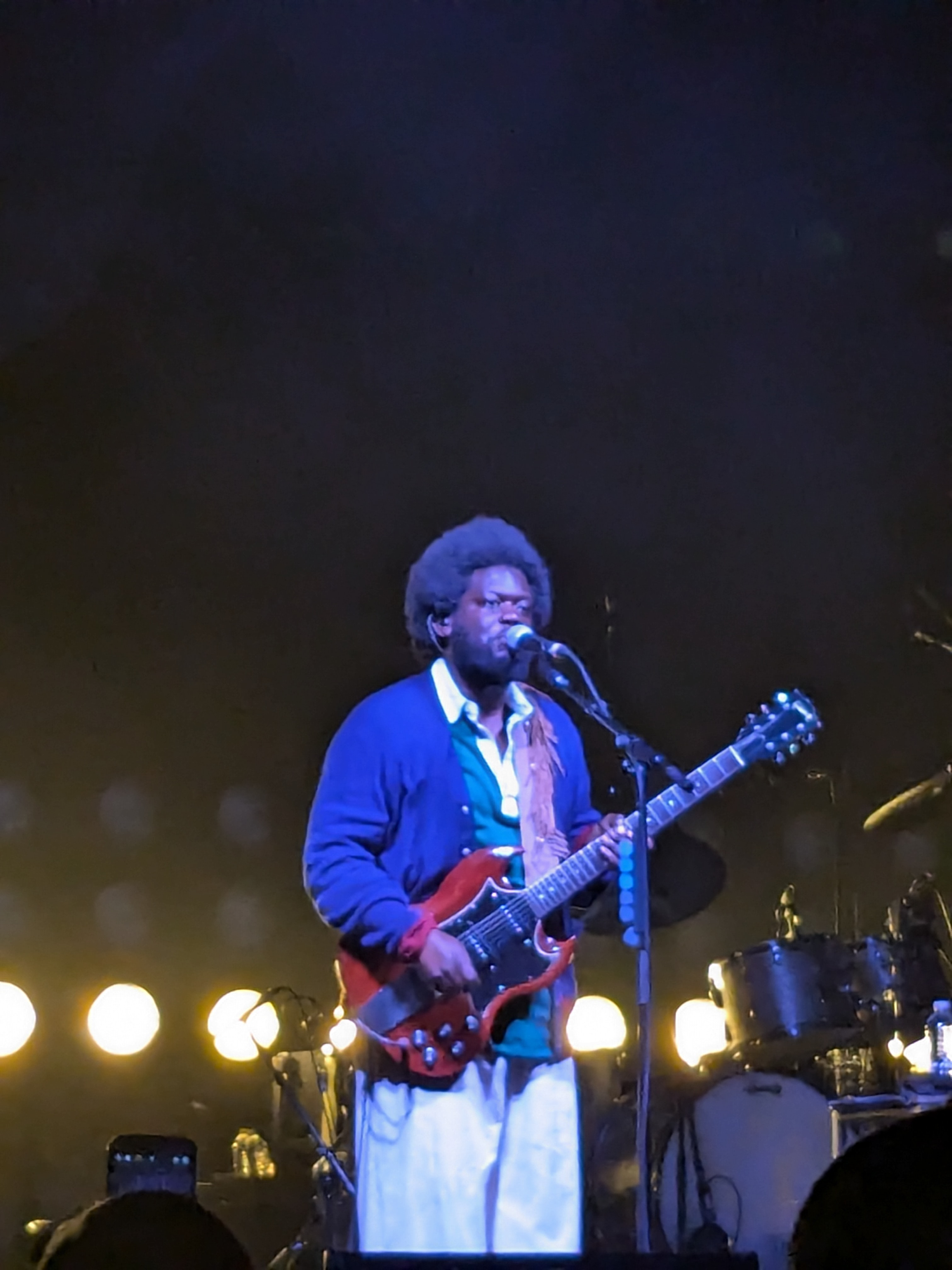
Kiwanuka performing in September 2024

=== Early years ===
Kiwanuka worked as a session guitarist, playing with Chipmunk and Bashy before working as a solo artist. His first proper gig was at The Oxford in Kentish Town at age 22. He came to the attention of Communion Records, which released his first two EPs, including his debut, Tell Me a Tale, on 13 June 2011.

=== 2011–2016: Home Again and Love & Hate ===
Kiwanuka supported Adele on her Adele Live 2011 tour, as well as at her iTunes Festival 2011 gig, and played at the 2011 Hard Rock Calling. In 2011, he signed a deal with Polydor Records. He was included in the BBC's Sound of 2012 poll and was named as the winner on 6 January 2012.

Kiwanuka released his debut studio album, Home Again, in 2012 to positive reviews from critics. The album peaked at number 4 in the UK and, as of 2012, has sold over 70,000 copies in the UK.

After scrapping an entire second album (due to be called Night Songs) after he was discouraged by an A&R man, in 2016, Kiwanuka released his follow-up to Home Again, Love & Hate. The album was a critical and commercial success, reaching number 1 on the UK albums chart. The album was produced by Danger Mouse and spawned several singles. The song "Cold Little Heart" was the theme of the HBO series Big Little Lies.

=== 2018–2019: Collaborations and Kiwanuka ===
Kiwanuka recorded a track called "On My Knees" with UNKLE for the 2018 soundtrack to the film Roma. In 2019 he collaborated with Tom Misch on the single "Money". His own song "You Ain't the Problem" preceded his third album Kiwanuka, which was released in November 2019, again to critical and commercial success. The album placed at number 2 in the UK charts, has been gold certified for over 100,000 sales, and won the UK Mercury Music Prize for 2020, his first win after his first two albums were nominated. Danger Mouse was involved with the album, along with producer Inflo. Kiwanuka said that the choice of album name reflected his increasing confidence in being himself.

=== 2020s: Small Changes and Fudge ===
In 2024, Kiwanuka announced a co-headlining tour with American rock singer-songwriter Brittany Howard. In June 2024, Kiwanuka played a set on the Pyramid stage at the Glastonbury Festival. In July 2024, Kiwanuka released the single "Floating Parade", his first new music in three years. That song appeared on his fourth studio album, Small Changes, which was released on 22 November 2024.

Having completed a headlining tour of the UK and Europe in February, in July 2025, Kiwanuka cancelled European festival dates, including at Sziget Festival, due to "continued illness", as reported by his management team. He also was forced to pull out of a support slot for Mumford & Sons through North America later that year.

Kiwanuka's fifth studio album Fudge was released on 23 October 2026, a month after its announcement.

== Musical style ==
Kiwanuka has acknowledged influences from musicians such as Jimi Hendrix, The Beatles, The Rolling Stones, The Doors, Pink Floyd, Nirvana, Ray Charles, Bill Withers, Otis Redding, Jack Johnson, Sam Cooke, Chuck Berry, Pops Staples, The Band, Janis Joplin, Joni Mitchell, Bob Dylan, Frank Zappa, Neil Diamond, Eric Clapton, Joe Cocker, Eric Bibb, Tommy Sims, Dobie Gray, Wham!, Richie Havens, John Lee Hooker, Taj Mahal, Rod Stewart, Todd Rundgren, Jim Croce, David Bowie, Bobby Womack, Sly and the Family Stone, and Funkadelic. He has played with James Gadson, who drummed for Bill Withers.

Among others, Kiwanuka’s musical style has been compared to Bill Withers, Marvin Gaye, Curtis Mayfield, and Terry Callier.

== Personal life ==
Kiwanuka and his wife Charlotte, a Christian musician, married in 2016. They have lived in Southampton since 2019, and have two children. Kiwanuka has openly discussed his struggles with anxiety and other mental health issues. He is a practising Christian, and a lifelong fan of Tottenham Hotspur FC.

In September 2026, Kiwanuka revealed on his Instagram that in July 2025, he suffered a severe stroke as a result of high blood pressure, and is currently undergoing rehabilitation in Hampshire. This resulted in several live dates being cancelled and the release of his album Fudge being delayed until October 2026.

== Discography ==
- Home Again (2012)
- Love & Hate (2016)
- Kiwanuka (2019)
- Small Changes (2024)
- Fudge (2026)

== Awards and nominations ==
Year	Organisation	Award	Work	Result
2011	BBC	Sound of 2012	—N/a	Won
2012	Brit Awards	Critics' Choice	—N/a	Nominated
2012	Barclaycard	Mercury Prize	Home Again	Nominated
2012	MTV Europe Music Awards	Best Push Act	—N/a	Nominated
2016	Hyundai	Mercury Prize	Love & Hate	Nominated
2016	Q Awards	Best Solo Artist	—N/a	Nominated
2016	MOBO Awards	Best Album	Love & Hate	Nominated
2016	MOBO Awards	Best R&B / Soul Act	—N/a	Nominated
2016	LOS40 Music Awards	Critics' Award	—N/a	Won (Note: Ex aequo with Love of Lesbian.)
2016	BBC Music Awards	Album of the Year	Love & Hate	Nominated
2017	Brit Awards	British Male Solo Artist	—N/a	Nominated
2017	Brit Awards	British Album of the Year	Love & Hate	Nominated
2017	Worldwide Awards	Album of the Year	Love & Hate	Won
2017	HiPipo Music Awards	Best Global Act	Love & Hate	Won
2019	Rough Trade	Albums of the Year	Kiwanuka	Included
2019	BBC Radio 6 Music	Albums of the Year	Kiwanuka	#3
2020	Brit Awards	British Male Solo Artist	—N/a	Nominated
2020	Brit Awards	British Album of the Year	Kiwanuka	Nominated
2020	Hyundai	Mercury Prize	Kiwanuka	Won
2020	63rd Annual Grammy Awards	Best Rock Album	Kiwanuka	Nominated
