= Al Burnett =

British impresario (1906–1973)

Al Burnett (1906–1973) was a British impresario, known as the "nightclub king". He ran the Stork Club in Swallow Street in London's West End.

== Early life ==
He was born Aaron Isaacs in Mile End, London.

== Career ==
Burnett was master of ceremonies (MC) at a nightclub in London's Regent Street called The Nut House, which was popular with jazz musicians during the war.

In the late 1950s, notable guests at the Stork Club included Harold Macmillan, John Profumo, Peter Sellers, Frank Sinatra, Lana Turner, Bette Davis, Ava Gardner, Elizabeth Taylor, King Hussein of Jordan, and Jean Simmons. In about 1969, he banned Barbara Windsor, whose agent was Burnett's son, Barry Burnett, for refusing to sit with a customer, even though she was not working as a hostess at the time. It was later owned by Oscar Owide, eventually becoming a "sleazy hostess joint", before Marco Pierre White and Piers Adam tried (and failed) to revive it as a glamorous destination.

Burnett owned The Astor, which was later acquired by Bertie Green.

He owned the Pigalle Club in Piccadilly, and won the 1958 English Greyhound Derby with his dog Pigalle Wonder, who set new records on seven British tracks.

Burnett was also an actor, and appeared in King Arthur Was a Gentleman (1942), Café Continental (1947), and Sweet Beat (1959).
