= Birnie =

Birnie may refer to:

- Birnie (surname)
- Birnie, Moray, a former inhabited place and civil parish south of Elgin, Moray, Scotland
  - Birnie Kirk, a church at Birnie, Moray
- Birnie Island, an island in the Republic of Kiribati
- Birnie Loch, a loch in North East Fife, Scotland

== See also ==
- Bernie (disambiguation)
- Byrnie, a form of chainmail armour
