= Alexander Birnie (disambiguation) =

Alexander Birnie may refer to:

- Alexander Birnie (1763-1835), Scottish merchant and shipowner
- Alex Birnie (1884-1949), Scottish footballer, see List of Bury F.C. players (25–99 appearances)
