= Richard Corrigan =

Irish chef

- Born: 10 February 1964 (age 62); County Meath, Ireland
- Education: Dublin Institute of Technology
- Occupation: Chef
- Spouse: Maria

Richard Corrigan (born 10 February 1964) is an Irish chef. He is the chef patron of Corrigan's Mayfair, Bentley's Oyster Bar and Grill, Daffodil Mulligan restaurant and Gibney's bar in London; Virginia Park Lodge and adjoining pub the Deerpark Inn in Virginia, County Cavan; and most recently The Portrait Restaurant, on the top floor of the National Portrait Gallery in London.

== Early life ==
Richard Corrigan was born and raised in Ballivor, County Meath. He was raised on a small, rural farm of around 25 acres, and credits his upbringing for making him "very unpretentious about good food... it instills respect, because you know the hard graft that goes into producing it".

He studied at Dublin Institute of Technology, but left school at the age of 14 to work as a trainee chef in the Kirwin Hotel in Athboy, Ireland. At the time the school leaving age in Ireland was 16. At age 17, Corrigan moved to the Netherlands to work at several hotels to gain further experience, including the Hilton in Amsterdam, where he recalls the head chef achieving a Michelin Star: "I remember him sending me out in the middle of the night to pick herbs without a torch. We were so frightened of him. When Michelin gave him the star, all the kitchen staff went on strike."

== Career ==
After spending four years in the Netherlands, Richard Corrigan moved to London in 1985 to work with Michel Lorrain, father of chef Jean-Michel Lorain, at the Le Méridien hotel in Piccadilly.

Following this, Corrigan headed up Stephen Bull's Blandford Street Restaurant, before moving to Mulligan's in Mayfair and taking a stint as head chef at future acquisition Bentley's Oyster Bar and Grill. He returned to work for Bull in 1994, launching Fulham Road where he gained his first Michelin star.

A collaboration with contract caterer Searcys in 1996 led to projects such as Searcy's Brasserie at the Barbican, the opening of the House restaurant and the English Garden, both in Chelsea, and the prized contract to operate an exclusive restaurant and bar atop The Gherkin in 2004.

In 1997, he opened Lindsay House in Soho, London. Located in a four-storey 1740s townhouse, the restaurant was awarded a Michelin star in 1999 and quickly developed into a London favourite. More accolades followed, with Corrigan winning the Outstanding London Chef award in the 2000 Carlton London Restaurant Awards, and Lindsay House being named one of London's five finest restaurants by Gault Millat in 2005.

In 2005, he purchased Bentley's, where he had previously worked as head chef under owner Oscar Owide and carried out extensive renovations, returning the listed building to its former glory and realising the potential he had seen there years before. He went on to open Corrigan's Mayfair in 2008, which received accolades such as being awarded London Restaurant of the Year by the Evening Standard in 2008, earning three AA Rosettes, and being named ‘AA London Restaurant of the Year’ in 2009. It also received a high ranking in the National Restaurant Awards.

On the day he opened Corrigan's Mayfair, he announced the closure of Lindsay House, citing problems with the ageing building and the restaurant's tiny kitchen: "Everyone who came to see that kitchen couldn't believe we could serve 90 covers. Gordon Ramsay, Marcus Wareing, Steven Doherty - all the chefs said: ‘Corrigan, how on earth are you doing it?'"

Corrigan has been the winner of the Great British Menu three times. Additionally, he won the Great British Waste Menu special in 2010.

In 2014, Corrigan purchased an 18th-century hunting estate, Virginia Park Lodge, in Virginia, County Cavan, having married his wife, Maria, there 28 years before. In 2023, he opened a pub in Virginia, the Deerpark Inn, which has subsequently won Gastropub of the Year in Georgina Campbell's Guide to Ireland.

In 2019, he opened Daffodil Mulligan, an Irish grill restaurant in Shoreditch, as well as basement bar Gibney's London alongside Tony Gibney of Gibney's Malahide, and John Nugent.

He has again collaborated with Searcys, opening The Portrait Restaurant, on the top floor of the refurbished National Portrait Gallery, London in July 2023. The Portrait Restaurant has received rave reviews from Tim Hayward in the Financial Times and Giles Coren in The Times.

== Television ==
- Cookery School (Channel 4)
- Chef's Race (BBC America)
- Great British Menu (BBC Two)
- Great British Food Revival (BBC Two)
- Full On Food, Saturday Kitchen (BBC One)
- Market Kitchen (UKTV)
- Something For The Weekend (BBC Two)
- The Wright Stuff (Channel 5)
- Corrigan Knows Food (RTÉ)
- The Taste (Channel 4)

== Books ==
- 1999: The Richard Corrigan Cookbook: From the Waters to the Wild published by Hodder & Stoughton Ltd, ASIN: B001LN4LGY
- 2008: The Clatter of Forks and Spoons: Honest, Happy Food published by Fourth Estate, ISBN 978-0007248902
- 2011: Cookery School: Where anyone can learn to cook published by Penguin Books, ISBN 9780718158064

== See also ==
- List of oyster bars
