= Nick House =

British businessman (born 1974)

- Born: March 1974 (age 51)
- Citizenship: British
- Occupation(s): Businessman, property developer, co-founder of Gold, Mahiki, Whisky Mist, Bodo's Schloss, Punch Bowl
- Children: 2

Nicholas Martin House (born September 1974), known as Nick House, is a British entrepreneur and nightclub owner. Based in London, his venues cater to celebrities and royals.

He is the co-owner of Mahiki (a Polynesian-themed nightclub and cocktail bar), Whiskey Mist, Bodo's Schloss and Mayfair's The Punch Bowl, owned with Guy Ritchie and Madonna. He co-founded Steam & Rye with Kelly Brook in the City of London.

== Early life ==
House is from a hamlet near Tunbridge Wells in Kent. He is the son of entrepreneurs Martin and Avril House. He described his parents as middle class in an Evening Standard interview. He was educated at the grammar school Skinners' School and University of Leeds.

== Career ==
At university House promoted club nights, evolving into Nick House Entertainment Limited employing 25 people and promoting 20 club nights a week in London's exclusive Mayfair and Kensington areas.

House rose to prominence in the London nightlife scene with the establishment of Mahiki in 2005. The venue garnered attention for its friendly exclusive atmosphere, exotic cocktails, and royalty. Later he co-founded with partners Whisky Mist, Bodo's Schloss, Tini, The Punch Bowl, The Brompton Club, The Markham Inn, Steam & Rye, Drama and Bonbonniere.

Mahiki expanded to pop-ups at Henley Royal Regatta.

In 2019, he opened a new VIP spot Gold in Portobello Market, Notting Hill.

== Awards ==
House was awarded Best Promoter at the London Bar and Club Awards 2011 and Best Interior Design for Bodo's Schloss in 2013.

== Personal life ==
House is teetotal.

In 2012, House dated Geri Halliwell from the Spice Girls.
