= Sweet Beat =

1959 British film by Ronnie Albert

- U.S. theatrical release poster
- Directed by: Ronnie Albert
- Screenplay by: Ron Ahran
- Story by: Sheldon Stark
- Produced by: Jeffrey S. Kruger
- Starring: Julie Amber; Sheldon Lawrence; Irv Bauer
- Cinematography: S.D Onions
- Edited by: Jay Dea
- Music by: Malcolm Lockyer
- Production company: Flamingo Film Productions
- Release date: 1959
- Running time: 57 minutes
- Country: United Kingdom
- Language: English

Sweet Beat (U.S. title: The Amorous Sex) is a 1959 British 'B' black-and-white musical film directed by Ronnie Albert and starring Julie Amber, Sheldon Lawrence and Irv Bauer. The screenplay was by Ron Ahran based on a story by Sheldon Stark. It includes appearances by several American pop acts including The Mello-Kings and The Five Satins.

== Preservation status ==
The British Film Institute National Archive holds no stills or ephemera, and no film or video materials.

== Plot ==
Bonnie Martyn, winner of a holiday camp beauty contest, heads to London seeking fame as a singer. She is promised a record deal, and is tricked into going to New York. She is eventually reunited with her boyfriend Bill Lacey.

== Cast ==
- Julie Amber as Bonnie Martyn
- Sheldon Lawrence as Bill "Larry" Lacey
- Irv Bauer as Dave Lafferts
- Leonie Page as Tina Miller
- David Browning as Gerry Turner
- Al Burnett as club owner
- Keith Fordyce as disc jockey (himself)
- Billy Myles as himself
- Cindy Man as herself (cut from U.S. version)
- Fred Parris as himself
- Lee Allen as himself
- The Mello-Kings as themselves
- The Five Satins as themselves

== Production ==
Filming locations included Butlin's holiday camps at Clacton-on-Sea and Cliftonville, and London's The Stork Room, run by Al Burnett.

== Soundtrack ==
The film featured the following songs:

- "Thanks" (Peter Warren, Adrienne Birkhard, Jeff Kruger)
- "Just for the Asking" (Buddy Kaye, Leon Carr)
- "Recently" (Tommie Connor)
- "Careless Caresses" (Billy Myles)
- "The Joker" (Billy Myles)
- "How Do You Mend a Broken Heart?" (Winfield Scott)
- "Boppin' at the Hop" (Lee Allen, A.Tyler)
- "Sweet Beat" (Tony Crombie)
- "Luva Luva Love Me" (George Scheck)
- "Tonite Tonite" (Billy Myles)
- "I Remember (in the Still of the Nite)" (Fred Parris)

In 1959 a 7-inch double A/B side EP was released in the UK with "Tonite Tonite", "I Remember", "Boppin' at the Hop" and "Luva Luva Love Me" (Top Rank Records, JKR 8007).

== Critical reception ==
The Monthly Film Bulletin wrote: "A mild and artless warning to the stage struck, relying on striptease, "pop" numbers and holiday camp and night club backgrounds for its teen-age appeal. Direction and performance are very uneven."

In British Sound Films: The Studio Years 1928–1959 David Quinlan rated the film as "poor", writing: "Bottom-budget pop musical/moral warning has that home-made look."

== Home media ==
The film was released on DVD in 2009 by Pegasus Entertainment.
