= Birnie (surname) =

Birnie is a surname. Notable people with the surname include:

- Alexander Birnie, (1763–1835), Scottish merchant and shipowner
- David and Catherine Birnie, Australian husband and wife pair of serial killers
- Esmond Birnie (born 1965), author, economist, and Ulster Unionist Party politician
- George Birnie Esslemont (1860–1917), British Liberal politician
- Harry Charles Birnie (1882–1943), Scottish seaman, captain with the Cunard line and commodore in the Royal Navy Reserve
- James Birnie (1799–1864), Scottish fur trader in the Pacific Northwest
- John Birnie Philip (1824–1875), English sculptor of the 19th century
- Patricia Birnie (1926–2013), British lawyer
- Ted Birnie (1878–1935), professional footballer and manager
- Tessa Birnie (1934–2008), New Zealand-born Australian concert pianist
- William Birnie Rhind (1853–1933), Scottish sculptor
