= Bentley's Oyster Bar and Grill =

- Interactive map of Bentley's Oyster Bar and Grill

Restaurant information
- Established: 1916; 110 years ago
- Food type: Seafood (oysters)
- Location: 11-15 Swallow Street, London, W1B 4DG, United Kingdom
- Coordinates: 51°30′34″N 0°08′16″W

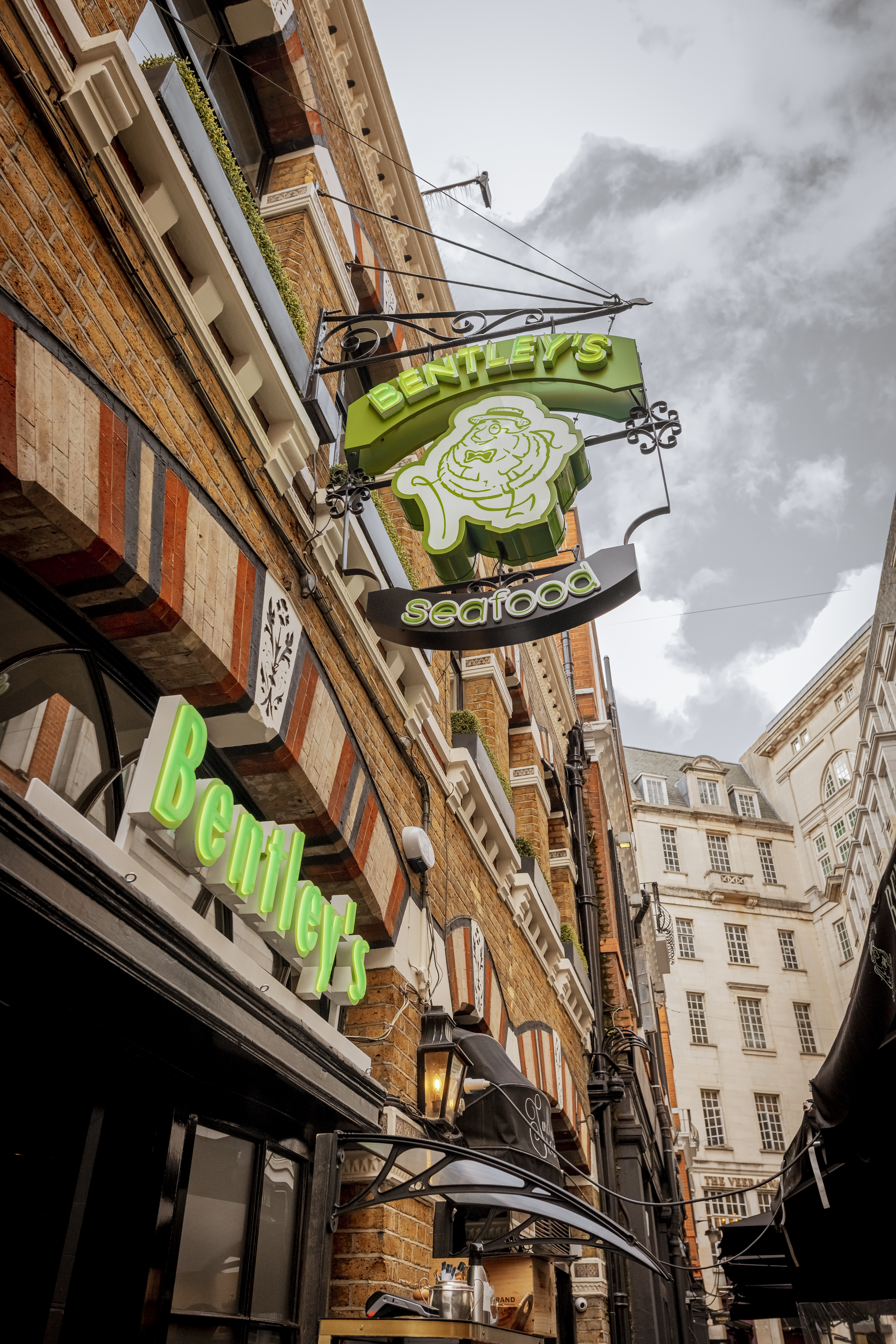
Bentley's Oyster Bar today

Bentley's Oyster Bar and Grill is a seafood restaurant at 11-15 Swallow Street, London, which opened in 1916. The restaurant, previously known as Bentley's, has always specialised in oysters and seafood, and serves classic British dishes under the stewardship of Chef Richard Corrigan.

== History ==
=== Twentieth century ===
Bentley's Oyster Bar was opened in 1916, by William "Bill" Bentley. An entertainer whose true passion was musical stand-up comedy, Bill founded the West Cliff Theatre, an open-air theatre in Clacton, alongside the entertainers Bernard Russell and Bert Graham. During the war, Bill's wife, Ethel Rose, with whom he shared five sons, convinced him to invest in oyster beds in West Mersea. The success of this led him to selling oysters from an oyster barrow by the pier in Clacton-on-Sea, and then opening Bentley's Oyster Bar and Grill in 1916.

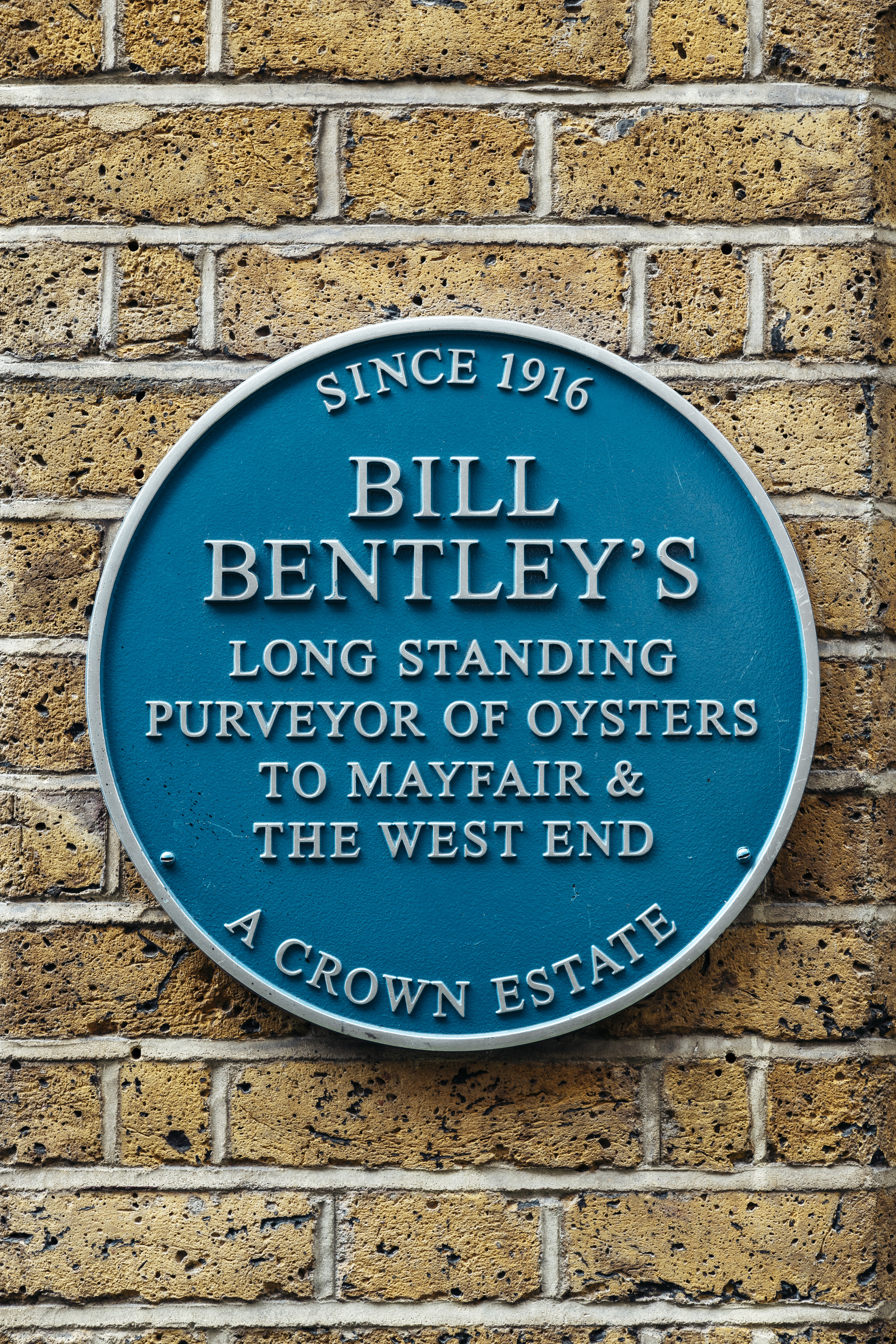
The Bentley's Oyster Bar Blue Plaque

The restaurant did not stop his urge to perform, and up until 1934, he caught the early morning commuter train up to town, returning on the evening train just in time to change and go on at the West Cliff.

=== Twenty-first century ===
Bentley's was owned for some years by Oscar Owide, "once one of London's favourites but in Owide's ownership, a rather shabby place".

=== Current ownership ===
Bentley's was purchased by the chef Richard Corrigan in 2005. Richard Corrigan had previously held the title of Head Chef at the restaurant under Owide, and had been convinced of its potential. He set his sights on returning it to its former glory, giving the restaurant a major refurbishment and restoring the menu to the fresh oyster and seafood focus it still holds today.

== Reviews ==
Upon its refurbishment by Chef Corrigan, The Guardian described the new Bentley's as:

A fine job reviving this fusty old relic, and if the upstairs grill seems sedate, that's doubtless intentional. All the noise and merriment is concentrated in the marbly, wood-panelled room below, and anyone whose affection for the mollusc is reciprocated is directed to the oyster bar downstairs.

with reviewer Matthew Norman awarding it an 8/10.
Food Critic Jay Rayner has reviewed Bentley's twice, upon its reopening in 2005, and again in 2021, where he said of his visits:

In any case what scant anonymity I have is useless here, not because I do this job, but because I am a regular. I even have a favoured stool at the marble-topped oyster bar and I’m not ashamed of the fact: it’s the one three in from the door to the kitchen.

Fay Maschler named Bentley's as one of her favourite restaurants for The Evening Standard, saying:

It is a serious enterprise devoted to prime ingredients treated with wit and brio, and because ebullient Richard Corrigan is a consummate chef and restaurateur.

== See also ==
- List of seafood restaurants
