= Top Hat Rendezvous =

British television variety series (1951–1952)

Top Hat Rendezvous is a sixty-minute television variety series, which aired on an occasional basis on the BBC from 1951 to 1952. Each episode had a different host, and these included Al Burnett, McDonald Hobley, Derrick de Marney, David Southwood and Clifford Davis.

It is unlikely that any of the episodes still exist, as the series aired live, and the BBC rarely telerecorded shows prior to 1953.
