= Astor Club =

Former nightclub in London, England

Coordinates: 51.5085°N 0.1443°W

The Astor Club was a nightclub which operated in Mayfair, London from the 1930s to the late 1970s. The haunt of royals and car dealers, gangsters and landed aristocrats, it was a fixture in London nightlife, with the most famous years of the club being the decades between 1950 and 1970. The Astor was one of the most prestigious of a number of nightclubs and "hostess clubs" which flourished particularly in the period between the end of the Second World War in 1945 and the opening of the 1960s and 1970s discothèques. Such watering-holes had almost all disappeared by the 1980s, when discos and nightclubs merged into the nocturnal "clubs" of those years, a situation which led up to the present-day London night-time economy.

== Bertie Green ==
The Astor was established in the 1930s and flourished even during the dangerous times London experienced during the Second World War, including London Blitz of 1940–1941 and the V-1 and V-2 rocket attacks of 1944–1945. The venue was owned by Bertie Green, a businessman and manager of show business performers.

Green has been described by Michele Monro, daughter of Matt Monro, as "[not] one of nature's gentlemen. He had a very bad reputation as a villain and used to sign artists up with the sole intention of doing nothing and then suing them... a greedy bastard, a no-good greedy bastard."

== Postwar London nightlife ==
Like the Stork Room, an attempt to copy the American Stork Club in Manhattan, the Astor was one of the London nightclubs which attracted wealthy revellers, members of the aristocracy, young Guards officers and occasionally minor royals, as well as successful criminals (both "working" criminals and gangsters). Other clubs vied for the same clientele, or, in contrast, attracted very niche crowds. They included the Embassy Club, the Blue Angel, Annabel's (founded only in 1963, more select than the others, originally the haunt of the very wealthy and the aristocracy; still operating), the Gargoyle Club, the Bagatelle, the Continental, the Colony Room (not to be confused with the Colony Club), Churchill's (a hostess club which existed until about 1990, was later revived as New Churchill's and still operates), the Gaslight Club (still operating in different format), the Pink Elephant Club (gay), Danny la Rue's (drag) etc. There was also The Saddle Room, which (despite the horsey-set name, aristocratic and royal clientele and off-Park Lane address) was one of the first discotheques in London, the disco trend having begun in Paris and on the Cote d'Azur.

In a London still very class-riven, these clubs provided a place where a wide spectrum of London society rubbed shoulders. It has been said of the Gargoyle that "its membership embraced toffs and artists: from Nancy Cunard to Nancy Mitford, Victor Rothschild to Roland Penrose, Lee Miller to William Burroughs, and, occasionally in the mix, the odd spy, such as Guy Burgess."

The famous American syndicated columnist Walter Winchell wrote in 1953 that "there's more night-life in London than anywhere in U.S... Everyone dines after theater—shows start at 6.15 and 8.30... Great Latin band at the Astor Club..."

== Patrons and reputation ==
The Astor was usually described in the press as in such terms as "glittering", "ritzy", "chic" and, in the American newspapers, "swanky". Princess Margaret, younger sister of the Queen, no stranger to London nightlife (and what was then called "cafe society" in contradistinction to "Society"), was seen at the Astor on occasion, as in 1952, when she and her entourage enjoyed the performance of the Deep River Boys, a group which mainly sang American gospel music. The Princess described the Deep River Boys as "my very favourite entertainers".

Lord Lichfield (Patrick Anson, a.k.a. Patrick Lichfield), cousin of the Queen, ex-Guards officer and fashionable photographer, was often to be seen there in the early 1960s.

Another royal personage linked with the Astor was the young King Hussein of Jordan, whom Bertie Green claimed as a friend. Hussein was supposed to have fallen in love with an equally young hostess, Helene Morris. Because Miss Morris was Jewish, the rumours of the affair, including rumours that she was pregnant by the King, threatened to cause a crisis for the King. Green appeared on television and defended King Hussein, flatly denying all of the rumours; he dismissed Miss Morris when the newspapers caught wind of the alleged affair.

An account by April Ashley, a trans woman publicly outed in the early 1960s, describes the Astor of that time as having been "black tie and full of tarts".

The Astor in the 1950s has been described as having been "littered with prostitutes, which the club politely called hostesses, who'd wait for a table to be filled and then order champagne for the guests at £2 a bottle (equivalent to £45 in 2025). They'd get a pound for each bottle purchased, earning up to a tenner on good nights." This at a time when most workers were paid between £2 and £9 per week.

It has been said that the Astor clientele was markedly more prestigious in the early 1950s than it became later, especially in the 1960s era of the Krays and others; however, in 1950, long before the active years of the Krays and Richardsons, another habitué, George Ellis, had been attacked outside the Astor, slashed with a razor and the girl with him kicked into the gutter, allegedly at the behest of the woman he later married, Ruth Neilson, better known to history as Ruth Ellis, who was later to be hanged for the murder of another of her lovers. Ruth was a club hostess herself, though not at the Astor.

== Artistes and showbusiness ==
Bertie Green, the owner of the Astor, discovered the British singer Yana, who shot to fame in the 1950s after having sung as a dare and at a private party held at the club. Another singer who first performed (solo) at the Astor (in 1959) was the 1960s star Kathy Kirby.

Yana was not the only amateur singer to have been offered a job at the Astor by Bertie Green. In 1957, he suggested to American tennis player Althea Gibson, who had just won the Ladies' Singles tournament at Wimbledon and who had sung for fun at a private party held at the Astor to celebrate her victory, that there was a job for her if she wanted to take it (she didn't).

Other singers, famous or about to be so, performed at the Astor in the 1950s and early 1960s. Tom Jones sang there, though he was not top of the bill. That position was taken by Engelbert Humperdinck. Tom Jones was still almost unknown to the British public and is said to have been so hungry at that stage of his career that─while supporting Humperdinck at the Astor—he stole and ate a steak about to be served to one of the Kray twins, the most notorious British gangsters of their era. At that time the Krays were getting a "pension" (i.e. protection money) of £200 per week (equivalent to £4,008 in 2025) from the Astor management.

It was when she was singing at the Astor in 1955 that Shirley Bassey was discovered by bandleader and impresario Jack Hylton. Others who were auditioned there and taken on for a while included singers Elkie Brooks and Anita Harris, amid many whose fame was lesser or fleeting.

== Gangsters ==
The address of the Astor, off Berkeley Square, Mayfair, reinforced its "respectable" credentials, despite the fact that gangland not infrequently came to clubland, as when the psychopathic gangster, Frankie Fraser, buried a hatchet in the skull of one Eric Mason, an associate of the Krays, outside the club (Mason was later dumped, "barely alive", outside Whitechapel Hospital in East London).

However wealthy and respectable were many of the Astor's patrons and despite the royal visits, London gangsterism was never very far away from the club, as when (in 1956) the notorious gangster, Billy Hill, was accused, in the course of a trial, of having offered a "monkey" (£500) (equivalent to £10,831 in 2025) and the cost of plastic surgery to a man, if that man would allow himself to be slashed across the face outside the Astor.

In 1958, the doorman at the Astor, Jimmy Nash, a member of a "well-known" London family, was tried at the Old Bailey for murder, at the time a capital offence. The accusation was that he had shot and killed Selwyn Keith Cooney in The Pen Club in the—at the time—very disreputable area of East London known as Spitalfields. He was acquitted amid talk of "jury nobbling" and interference with witnesses, but the following year was accused of Grievous Bodily Harm to Cooney (GBH), convicted and sentenced to 5 years' imprisonment.

It was at the Astor in December 1965 that the infamous East End (East London) Kray twins had a confrontation with the South London criminals known as the Richardson Gang; during that face-off, the gangster George Cornell is said to have referred to Ronnie Kray as a "fat poofter" (in another version, "a big fat poof"), a remark which led to a gangland war (Cornell himself being shot dead in March 1966 in front of witnesses at the bar of the Blind Beggar pub in Whitechapel) and so, ultimately, to the trials and sentences which destroyed both the Kray and Richardson gangs. Indeed, when the Krays were arrested for the Cornell murder (two years after the fact), they were drinking (at 6 a.m.) at The Lion pub, Bethnal Green, intending to move on later to the Astor.

== Later years ==
The Astor survived beyond the era of the Krays and Richardsons and continued to attract wealthy customers. An Astor Big Band was formed by bandleader Terry Steel; it played before Frank Sinatra at the club in 1971 and outlived its original one-month engagement, playing for five years and becoming particularly popular in Denmark, where it performed at the famous Tivoli Gardens in Copenhagen. It re-formed, for a charity performance, as late as 2015.

The Astor Club closed in the late 1970s.
