= Yana (singer) =

British singer (1932–1989)

Yana (born Pamela Guard; 16 February 1931 – 21 November 1989) was a British singer, best known for her television appearances in the late 1950s.

== Early life and work ==
Yana was born Pamela Guard on 16 February 1931, in Billericay, Essex (her later publicity people thought that it sounded more interesting to describe her as "Cornish-born"). As a teenager, she became a hairdresser's assistant, and then a fashion model at the Gaby Young modelling agency.

Her singing career started when Bertie Green, the owner of the plush Astor Club in London, heard her (aged 19) singing at a private party in the club, her friends having dared her to get up and sing; Green booked her as a cabaret artiste. She also sang, from 1954, at the expensive Pigalle restaurant in Piccadilly.

== Peak fame ==
The peak of Yana's fame came in the years 1955–1960, when she appeared in her own BBC TV show, The Yana Show (1956), as well as on The Ed Sullivan Show and The Bob Hope Show in the United States.

In 1956, she sang in a cameo role in the film The Cockleshell Heroes, as a member of the Women's Royal Naval Service (part of the Royal Navy). In 1955, she had made a somewhat similar brief appearance (as a civilian singer in the fictional "Coastal Forces Club") in another very British film, The Ship That Died of Shame, based on the Nicholas Monsarrat short novel of the same name.

Yana made another brief appearance, as a nightclub singer, in the 1957 British film Interpol (which, like The Cockleshell Heroes, was made by Warwick Films and featured some of the same actors, including Sydney Tafler and Trevor Howard, though top billing went to Hollywood stars Victor Mature and Anita Ekberg).

The recently launched ITV commercial television channel (there was, at the time, only one in the UK) featured Yana in its popular variety show Sunday Night at the London Palladium from 1955.

In 1955, Yana supported Bob Hope in his tour of American military bases and camps in Iceland (that country having been occupied during the Second World War). Hope was quoted in the American press as saying that he had discovered a new singer in Britain, Yana by name, as well as that "she has a beautiful voice and she's England's answer to Marilyn Monroe".

Over the following year, Yana made over 200 TV appearances in the US, Canada and Mexico. She was famous enough by then to be mentioned briefly in American newspapers without needing much introduction, as when the gossip columnist of the Milwaukee Sentinel, Earl Wilson, whose column was syndicated throughout the US, noted (in March 1956) that "the shapely British singer, Yana, is being sought by Columbia Pictures". She was read about in provincial American towns such as Sarasota, Florida as well as in Hollywood and New York City.

Yana's biggest success as a singer was with "Climb Up the Wall", which is regarded as one of the top 30 British popular songs of the 1950s; despite that and her other recordings (Columbia Records and His Master's Voice, mostly), it has been said that Yana's earnings from records totalled only about £100 in the money of the time, by reason of the contractual arrangements typically in place for UK recording artists of that era.

The Yana Show was not very successful; it was pulled after less than a dozen episodes. Despite its short run, the show did feature not only famous entertainers of the day, but one or two whose major fame came later, such as the diminutive comedian Ronnie Corbett. Corbett, in his autobiography, High Hopes, described Yana as "the glamorous blonde singer who specialised in plunging necklines and was a tremendous success in the '50s and '60s. But her career had its ups and downs – unlike her neckline, which mostly had its downs". Corbett also noted that, during the run of the show, Yana was having an affair or at least a flirtation with its writer, Digby Wolfe, who later found greater success with That Was The Week That Was and Rowan and Martin's Laugh-In.

Yana appeared in several pantomimes and in variety shows, alongside such British stars as Norman Wisdom, Tommy Steele, Arthur Haynes and George Formby, with whom she was said to have had an affair.

== Personal and later life ==
Yana kept much of her private life private. She was married three times: in 1948 as Pamela Guard; in 1964 as Yana Guard (to Alan Curtis, an actor and pantomime performer); and in 1967 as Yana Curtis. She also had a brief affair with George Formby. In George Formby: an intimate portrait of the troubled genius, David Bret wrote that, "blatantly lesbian despite being thrice-married and with a huge gay following, she was living with an American actress at the time, though George did not know this".

Yana's style was ultra-feminine even by the standards of the 1950s, and was markedly exuberant. She kissed the Lord Mayor of Newcastle repeatedly during a performance of "Climb Up the Wall" and, when councillors complained at the loss of civic dignity, offered to visit Newcastle and kiss all of them if they were jealous. She went about with an entourage of white poodles, offered to lend the cosmonaut Yuri Gagarin her car (personalised numberplate YG1) when he visited London in 1961 and, when asked in 1956 what she would do when she visited Hollywood, replied, "buy myself a monkey, darling – I am crazy about animals!" The Daily Telegraph described her at the London Palladium in 1957, "encased in a white gown that fitted like a bandage".

Yana ceased to be a famous name, face and figure in the 1960s; by the 1980s she was working at Boots the Chemists in Marylebone High Street, London, and in a chemist shop in Church Street off London's Edgware Road, near her home in Lisson Grove, Marylebone. She was briefly rediscovered, featuring in the British TV nostalgia show Where Are They Now?, and cast in a pantomime, The Wonderful Wizard of Oz as the Good Fairy in Crewe, Cheshire, but her last job was that of demonstrating a slimming machine at Harrods department store.

Yana developed oesophageal cancer and died at the age of 58 on 21 November 1989.
