= Oscar Owide =

British businessman

- Born: Oscar Manuel Owide; December 1931; Whitechapel, London, England
- Died: 3 December 2017 (aged 85–86)
- Occupation: Nightclub proprietor
- Spouse: Jeanette
- Children: 2

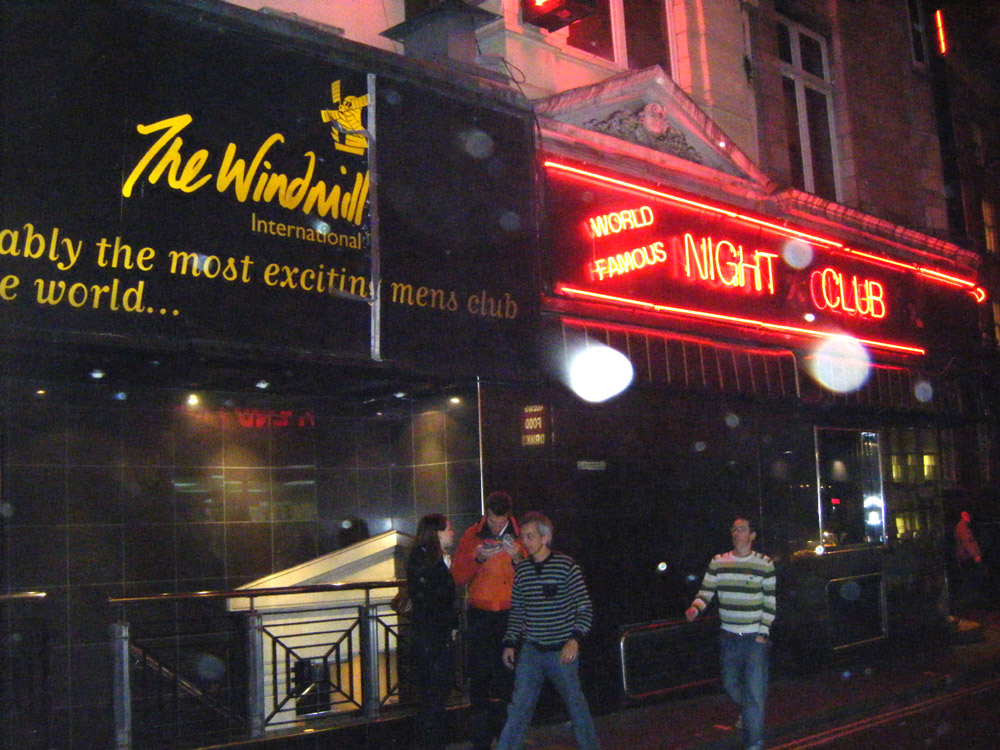
The Windmill Theatre, 2009

Oscar Manuel Owide (23 December 1931 – 3 December 2017) was a British businessman, who ran nightclubs, restaurants and sex industry businesses over a long career. He was the proprietor of Soho's Windmill Theatre, which he ran with his son Daniel Owide as the Windmill International, a "gentleman's club", offering adult cabaret, table and lap dancing. The Evening Standard in 2004 said Owide was once "Britain's biggest pimp".

== Early life ==
Oscar Owide was born in Whitechapel, London, in December 1931, the son of Isidore and Mary Owide. He grew up in Finsbury Park, where his father was a "prosperous hairdresser". His father was born Izrael Hillel Owide in Poland, and became a naturalised British citizen on 30 September 1937 as Isidore Owide, living at 35 Fore Street, Edmonton, London N18.

== Career ==
Owide began his career as a hairdresser in the family business. In the 1950s, he purchased his first nightclub, Ilford's Il Grotto. From the 1960s onwards, he shifted focus to the West End, running restaurants, lap-dancing clubs and hostess bars. In the 1970s, his nightclub Chaplin's at 9 Swallow Street "became known as a pick-up place for prostitutes".

In 1989, Owide received an 18-month prison term for VAT fraud. He served only a few weeks and paid a fine of £4,000. In 2000, he was banned for seven years form being a company director, after civil proceedings brought by the Department of Trade and Industry (DTI).

In the 1990s, Paul Raymond with whom he had been "on good terms since the 1940s" leased him the building that had housed the Windmill Theatre and was then Paramount City, and not viable as a theatre or as a nightclub, which around 1994 Owide turned into a lap-dancing club.

In 2002, he went into partnership with restaurateur Marco Pierre White and club owner Piers Adam, and combined Swallow Street's Stork Club and Crazy Horse, both of which Owide owned, into a new club called the Stork Rooms, but it closed six months later. In 2004, Owide pleaded guilty to four charges of acting as a company director while disqualified. He was fined £200,000 plus almost £30,000 prosecution costs.

Owide owned Bentley's restaurant at 11–15 Swallow Street, "once one of London's favourites but in Owide's ownership, a rather shabby place". It was purchased by the chef Richard Corrigan in 2005.

== Personal life ==
Owide married Jeanette, the daughter of an East End market trader. They have a son Daniel Owide, and a daughter, Juliette Owide who was the girlfriend of retail billionaire Philip Green in the early 1980s.

Owide lived in St John's Wood, London. He died in December 2017, aged 85, after suffering from cancer. The following month, the Windmill was threatened with closure for breaking the terms of its licence, in particular the "no touching" requirement between clients and performers.
