= Billy Myles =

American songwriter

William Myles Nobles (August 29, 1924 – October 9, 2005), known as Billy Myles, was an American R&B songwriter and singer active in the 1950s and 1960s. He is best known for writing "Tonight, Tonight" recorded by The Mello-Kings, "(You Were Made for) All My Love" recorded by Jackie Wilson (1960), and "Have You Ever Loved A Woman" recorded by Freddie King (1960), then Eric Clapton (1970).

== History ==
Billy Myles specialised in love ballads (sometimes in the doo-wop style) and 'Uptown Blues' songs, occasionally co-writing with vocalists such as Jackie Wilson and Brook Benton. Artists who recorded his songs include Wilson, Benton, Little Willie John, Freddie King and Gladys Knight. He has over 1170 works registered with the collecting society BMI.

Billy Myles recorded singles for labels Ember, Dot and King, though his only chart hit was "The Joker (That's What They Call Me)", which charted in the U.S. and Canada (US Pop #25, R&B #13) in 1957. He was working as a staff songwriter for Al Silver's New York City-based Herald/Ember labels, Silver thought the song wasn't suitable for doo-wop act The Mello-Kings and issued Myles' own recording. The success of the single led to Myles appearing on The Ed Sullivan Show in 1958 (alongside Buddy Holly), and the 1959 UK film Swing Beat with labelmates The Mello-Kings and The Five Satins. He also appeared in the film Sweet Beat (1959).

Blues guitarist Freddie King recorded Myles "Have You Ever Loved A Woman" in 1960, and King aficionado Eric Clapton covered the track on Derek and the Dominos' album Layla and Other Assorted Love Songs (1970). This album is highly regarded in Clapton's catalogue and classic rock in general, with Myles' song, like the title song "Layla", having a biographical resonance with Clapton's unrequited love for Patti Harrison.

Billy Myles lived in Greenville, North Carolina, and managed his music publishing company Selbonn Music Inc. ('Nobles' spelled backwards) until his death in October 2005. The music publishing is now managed by his son Steven Myles Nobles.

== Selective discography of Myles' compositions ==
- 1957 "Tonight Tonight" - The Mello-Kings (US Pop #77) - later covered by Dion, Timmy Thomas, The Tokens, The Four Seasons
- 1957 "The Joker (That's What They Call Me)"/"Honey Bee" - Billy Myles - (US Pop #25, R&B #13)- cover by The Hilltoppers (U.S. Pop #22)
- 1958 "King of Clowns"/"So In Need of You" - Billy Myles
- "Price Of Your Love"/"I’m Gonna Walk" - Billy Myles
- 1959 "Chapel of Dreams" - The Dubs (US Pop #74)
- 1960 "(You Were Made for) All My Love" - Jackie Wilson (US Pop #12) BMI award-winning song
- 1960 "Have You Ever Loved A Woman" - Freddie King - later covered by Derek and the Dominos, Eric Clapton, Little Milton, Van Morrison
- "I Love That Woman" - Freddie King
- 1961 "Your One and Only Love" - Jackie Wilson (US Pop #40)
- 1961 "The Greatest Hurt"/"There'll Be No Next Time" - Jackie Wilson (US Pop #34)
- "My Love Is" - Little Willie John - later covered by Diana Krall, Holly Golightly
- 1962 "Careless Hands" - Baby Washington
- "Let's Go Again (Where We Went Last Night)" - Hank Ballard and The Midnighters
- "The Hoochi Coochi Coo" - Hank Ballard and The Midnighters
- "If Ever I Should Fall in Love" - Gladys Knight & the Pips
- "Bye Bye Baby" - Johnny Copeland
- "I Won't Cry Anymore" - Big Maybelle
- "Tell Me Who" - Big Maybelle
- "Love, Oh Love" - Mongo Santamaría
- "No Love (But Your Love)" - Johnny Mathis
- "Nobody But Me" - Lou Rawls
- "Your Love Alone" - Brook Benton
