= John Keyse Sherwin =

English painter

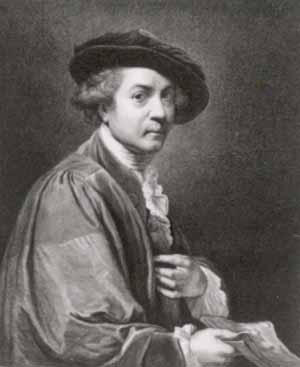
engraving of a Joshua Reynolds self-portrait

John Keyse Sherwin (1751 – 24 September 1790) was an English engraver and history-painter.

== Biography ==
Sherwin was born at East Dean in Sussex. His father was a wood-cutter employed in shaping bolts for shipbuilders, and the son followed the same occupation till his seventeenth year, when, having shown an aptitude for art by copying some miniatures, he was adopted by his father's landlord, William Mitford. Sherwin was sent to study in London, first under John Astley, and then for three years under Francesco Bartolozzi – for whom he is believed to have executed a large portion of the plate of Clytie, after Annibale Carracci, published as the work of his master.

Sherwin entered as a student of the Royal Academy, and gained a silver medal, and in 1772 a gold medal for his painting of "Coriolanus taking Leave of his Family". From 1774 till 1780 he was an exhibitor of chalk drawings and of engravings in the Royal Academy. Establishing himself in St James's Street as a painter, designer and engraver, he attained popularity and began to mix in fashionable society. His drawing of the "Finding of Moses", a work of but slight artistic merit, which introduced portraits of the princess royal of England and other leading ladies of the aristocracy, hit the public taste, and, as reproduced by his burin, sold largely.

In 1785 he succeeded William Woollett as engraver to the king, and he also held the appointment of engraver to the Prince of Wales. His professional income rose to about £12,000 a year; but he was constantly in pecuniary difficulties, for he was shiftless, indolent, and without method, open-handed and even prodigal in his benefactions – and prodigal, too, in less reputable directions, for he became a reckless gambler, and habits of intemperance grew upon him. He did however have a notable student, John Thomas Smith who trained with him for three years. Sherwin died in extreme penury on 24 September 1790 – according to George Steevens, the editor of Shakespeare, at The Hog in the Pound, an obscure alehouse in Swallow Street, or, as stated by his pupil J.T. Smith, in the house of Robert Wilkinson, a printseller in Cornhill.

It is as an engraver that Sherwin is most esteemed; and it may be noted that he was ambidextrous, working indifferently with either hand upon his plates. His drawing is correct, his line excellent and his textures are varied and intelligent in expression. Such of his plates as the "Holy Family" after Nicolas Poussin, "Christ Bearing the Cross" after Murillo, the portrait of the marquis of Buckingham after Thomas Gainsborough and that of Pitt occupy a high place among the productions of the English school of line-engravers. He also worked after Pine, Dance and Kauffman.
