= Piers Adam =

British businessman (born 1964)

Piers Benedict Adam
- Born: March 1964 (age 62)
- Citizenship: British
- Occupations: Businessman, owner of Mahiki and Whisky Mist
- Spouse: Sophie Vanacore (m. 2017)
- Children: 2

Piers Benedict Adam (born March 1964) is a British businessman, the owner of London nightclubs Mahiki, Whisky Mist and Tini, and the co-owner of Mayfair's The Punch Bowl with Guy Ritchie.

== Early life ==
Piers Adam was born in March 1964, and grew up in north London, the son of David Adam, a lawyer, and Shirley, an art teacher. He was educated at Highgate School and then Portsmouth Polytechnic, where he studied estate management, but failed.

== Career ==
In 2002, he went into partnership with restaurateur Marco Pierre White and fellow club owner Oscar Owide, and they combined Swallow Street's Stork Club and Crazy Horse into a new club called the Stork Rooms, but it closed six months later.

In 2014, Adam purchased the Craigellachie Hotel in the Moray village of Craigellachie.

In 2019, he launched his own Scotch whisky called Copper Dog.

== Personal life ==
Adam was the best man at Guy Ritchie's wedding to Madonna at Skibo Castle in 2000.

On 7 July 2017, Adam married model Sophie Vanacore in London. Adam lives in Kensington with his wife and their two sons.
