= Café Continental =

British BBC TV variety show (1947–1953)

Café Continental is a British television variety show, shown on the BBC Television Service from 1947 to 1953. Broadcast live from the BBC's studios at Alexandra Palace, the programme was opened by Al Burnett (who was later replaced by Helene Cordet) as the master of ceremonies, welcoming the television audience to the "café" set and telling them "your table has been reserved by the maître d'hôtel". In the earlier episodes (1947–1951), the maître d'hôtel was played by actor Claude Frederic; later (1951–1953), the role was played by Auguste Oswald Hotz De Baar, the real-life proprietor of London's Restaurant du Père Auguste. Introduced by Helene Cordet.

== Overview ==
Devised and produced by Henry Caldwell, Café Continental was broadcast on Saturday evenings at 8 pm. Lasting for 45 minutes, the episodes attracted many famous singers and dancers of the day: Josephine Baker appeared in an edition broadcast on 26 June 1948 and the Italian jazz vocal group Quartetto Cetra appeared the same year.

== Episode status ==
Three scattered episodes from 1950 are known to exist.
