= Mahiki =

Nightclub in London, England

Coordinates: 51.5076°N 0.1414°W

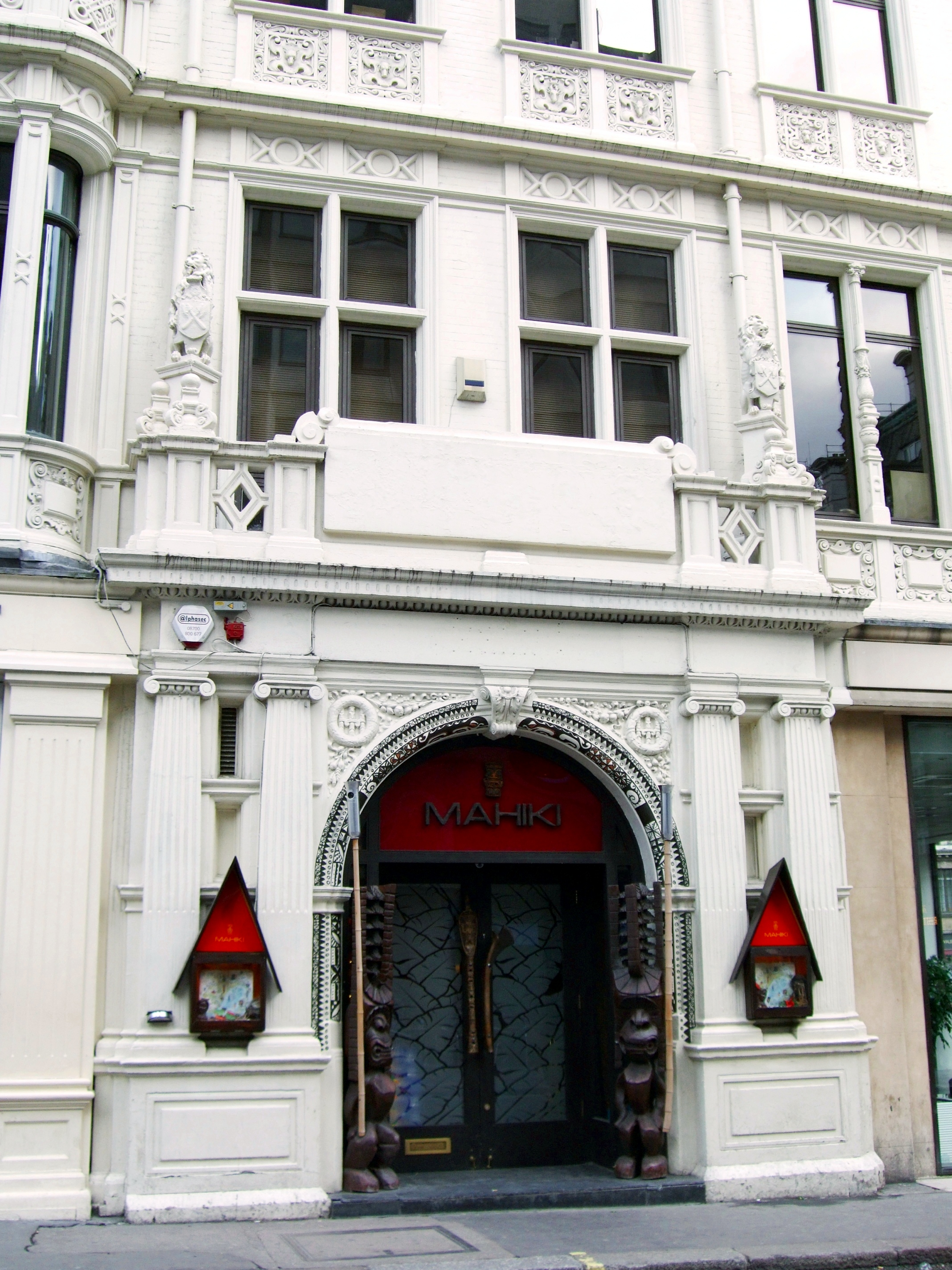
The outside of Mahiki, June 2008

Mahiki was a nightclub in Mayfair, London, which operated from 2006 until 2021.

== Nightclub ==
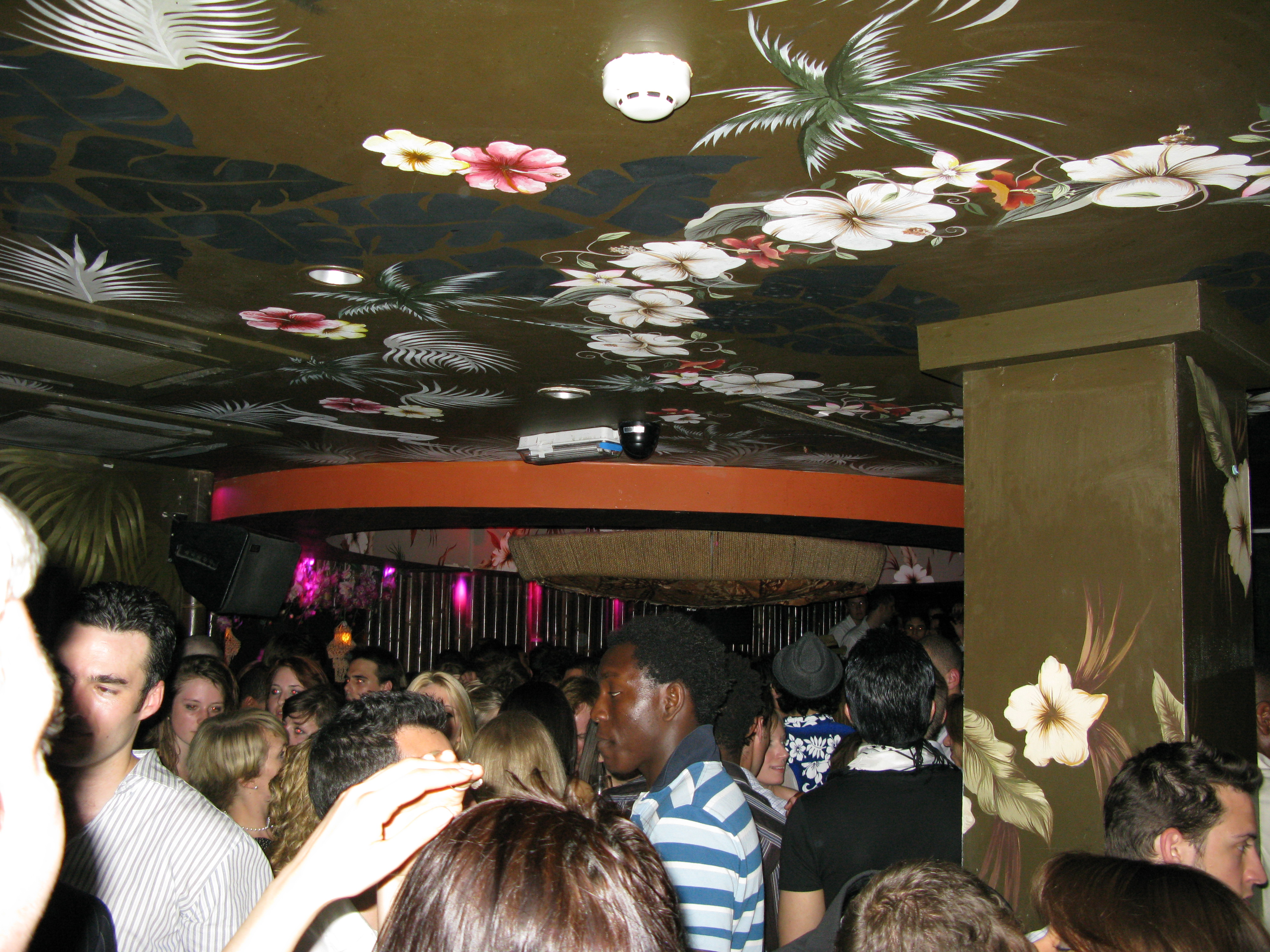
Inside Mahiki, June 2008

The club was established in 2006 at 1 Dover Street (the site of an earlier nightclub) by Piers Adam, David Phelps and Nick House. Mahiki was a nightclub and bar with a Polynesian and tiki theme, predominantly specialising in rum. Mahiki claimed to maintain a “democratic” door policy; according to House, "whether you're fat, thin, bald, ugly or old, you can get in.” For a time, the club was managed by Jack Brooksbank, who later married Princess Eugenie.

== Brand ==
=== Other clubs ===
A Mahiki club in Dubai, located at the Jumeirah Beach Hotel, opened in 2011 and closed in 2018, due to “unforeseen circumstances during the renovation” of the hotel, as stated by the owners at the time.

In 2017, Mahiki's owners further expanded and franchised the brand. In the course of that year, Mahiki Clubs have opened in Marbella, Spain, in the Forte Village Resort in Sardinia, in Manchester (in collaboration with Gary Neville's company GG Hospitality Management Ltd. , closed in 2018, reopened in 2019) and at a second London location (Mahiki Kensington, closed in 2019). There is also a Mahiki club in Gothenburg, Sweden.

=== Branded liquors ===
In 2008, a line of three rum blends exclusively sold at Selfridges (not available anymore) was released under the Mahiki brand. Mahiki Coconut, the club's branded rum coconut liqueur, was first introduced in 2011.

MBG has launched the Mahiki drinks range in Germany, Austria, the Netherlands, Switzerland, the United Arab Emirates and Spain in 2019. The original canned pre-mixes were replaced with the new products 'Mahiki Coconut Pineapple Cocktail' and 'Mahiki Coconut Maracuja Cocktail'. Later in 2019, a rum coconut liqueur with cream was added to the range. New pre-mixes were introduced in June 2020.

== Ownership ==
The London club was operated by Mahiki Ltd. (whose owners are Piers Adam and David Phelps). The Mahiki brand was originally registered to Taihiti Ltd. and is now owned by Tiki Brands Holding Ltd.

In 2018, the German drinks distributor MBG announced the acquisition of a 34.44 per cent share in Taihiti Inc. , together with the production licence for the Mahiki Coconut Rum beverages and exclusive distribution rights for the entire Mahiki range in Germany, the United Arab Emirates, Spain, Switzerland, Austria and the Netherlands.

Since May 2019, Andreas Herb, the managing director of MBG, is the sole director of Tiki Brands Holding Ltd. A confirmation statement published in 2020 lists Adam and MBG as the main shareholders of Tiki Brands Holding Ltd., with a 34.44 per cent stake each.
