= The Mello-Kings =

Former American doo-wop group

The Mello-Kings were an American doo-wop group, who became popular in the late 1950s with their song, "Tonite, Tonite" (1957).

The group consisted of brothers Jerry and Bob Scholl, Eddie Quinn, Neil Arena and Larry Esposito. The quintet was formed in 1956 at a high school in Mount Vernon, New York, United States, under the guidance of manager Dick Levister. Originally named the Mellotones, the group was signed to the Herald label.

"Tonite, Tonite" was written by Billy Myles, a staff composer for the label. The group was forced to change its name after the single's release, as another group had already claimed Mellotones. The record lasted more than ten weeks on the US pop chart.

In 1957 the group recorded several more singles, including "The Chapel on the Hill" and "Baby Tell Me Why Why Why", which did not chart, and "Valerie", which became a New York regional hit.

They appeared in the film Sweet Beat (1959).

Later, the quartet became a quintet with Anthony Pinto joining the group. The group appeared in revival shows in the late 1960s and early 1970s. On August 27, 1975, lead singer Bob Scholl was killed in a boating accident. The group began performing entirely at private corporate events throughout the years led by Jerry Scholl.

Richard Levister was locally popular in his own right as a musician who played the Hammond B-3 organ, and headed up a jazz-R&B trio that featured his brother, Millard Levister, on drums and either Jimmy Hill on alto or Mat Lewis on tenor saxophone. They played music clubs around Westchester County such as the Empire Room and The Blue Rose in New Rochelle. When Levister retired from the jazz/R&B scene, he continued working as a church organist in Mt. Vernon, New York, until his death at the age of 87 on December 7, 2014.

Jerry Scholl, a founding member, kept the Mello-Kings legacy moving forward with his partner and former Mello-King, Mick Mansueto. Eddie Quinn, the original second tenor, died on October 8, 2006. Scholl died on April 30, 2019. Prior to his death he asked his partner, Mansueto, to carry on the legacy of The Mello-Kings. Today they perform at casinos, performing art centers, theaters and festivals. In honor of Scholl, they book as Jerry Scholl presents The Mello-Kings.

On 4 December 2022, original member Neil Arena, with Ben Stephens, published Tonite, Tonite: The Story of the Original Mello-Kings.
