= I'm Going to Tell You a Secret =

2004 film by Jonas Åkerlund

- Title card
- Genre: Documentary
- Created by: Madonna
- Directed by: Jonas Åkerlund
- Starring: Madonna
- Narrated by: Madonna
- Country of origin: United States

Production
- Producers: Madonna (exec.); Bill Pohlad (exec.); Susan Applegate; Angela Becker; Shelli Jury; Keeley Gould
- Cinematography: Eric Broms
- Editor: Jonas Åkerlund
- Running time: 121 minutes
- Production companies: Maverick Films; Lucky Lou Productions; River Road Entertainment
- Budget: $1 million ($1.7 million in 2025 dollars)

Original release
- Network: MTV
- Release: October 21, 2005

I'm Going to Tell You a Secret is a 2005 American documentary film that follows singer Madonna on her 2004 Re-Invention World Tour. Directed by Jonas Åkerlund, the film premiered on MTV on October 21, 2005, and was released on DVD on June 20, 2006, by Warner Bros. Records. The documentary was originally called The Re-Invented Process, referencing the tour and the Steven Klein exhibition titled X-STaTIC Pro=CeSS. It starts with imagery from the exhibition and Madonna auditioning dancers for the tour, continues with her entourage travelling through different cities and performing, the singer's introspection on her life, her marriage, her religion, and her children, and ends with Madonna's visit to Israel in the midst of protests.

The documentary was inspired by Madonna's desire to show her artistic side on the tour and her devotion towards the Jewish mysticism Kabbalah. Unlike her 1991 documentary Truth or Dare, which portrayed Hollywood glamour, I'm Going to Tell You a Secret clarified from its beginning that it was about the singer's personal views on life and spirituality. Like Truth or Dare, the performance scenes were shot in color, while the rest of the film was in black-and-white. Besides Madonna, her dancers and her tour entourage, Åkerlund also shot her family, her working process and her day-to-day life. Madonna and her then-husband Guy Ritchie's local pub in Mayfair, London was used for some sequences. The film features appearances from Madonna's father and stepmother, as well as the filmmaker Michael Moore.

Before releasing the documentary, Madonna invited a select group of friends and co-workers to watch a rough three-hour cut of the film at a local theater in Notting Hill. The film was trimmed after negative feedback regarding excessive details about Kabbalah. For the promotion and premiere of the film, Madonna appeared at Q&A sessions with the press and also gave a speech to film students at New York's Hunter College. Critical response to I'm Going to Tell You a Secret was mixed, with reviewers complimenting the live performances and the scenes involving her children and family, but criticizing the self-indulgent and perceived pretentious nature. I'm Going to Tell You a Secret was released in a two-disc format, a CD with 14 songs from the show and a DVD with the documentary film. It received a positive response from critics but was a moderate success commercially.

== Synopsis ==
The documentary begins with scenes from the X-STaTIC Pro=CeSS, with Madonna featured as a queen sitting beside a coyote. The intro is followed by the singer recording vocals with music director Stuart Price and auditioning dancers for the Re-Invention World Tour.

After the first show of the tour at The Forum in Inglewood, California, Madonna attends a party with her dancers celebrating the success of the opening night. The tour moves to New York City with more rehearsal footage and Madonna asking her dancers to register for voting in the upcoming elections. Guy Ritchie jokes around with Madonna as she gets ready for the performance at Madison Square Garden, while Michael Moore appears in an interview segment, recalling how Madonna thanked him during the concert for his documentary.

In Chicago, Madonna's father Tony Ciccone is interviewed in his vineyard; he recalls Madonna's childhood. Ciccone and his wife Joan come to visit the singer at her concert in United Center. The entourage moves to Miami where Ritchie is shown angling with their son Rocco, plays with her daughter Lourdes, and Madonna reflects on relationships and her husband. By the time the tour reaches London, Madonna gets irritated with the journeys. Kabbalah comes into the picture with explanations of the mystical practice from Madonna and her teacher Eitan. At Slane Castle, Dublin, Madonna and her dancers were in danger of being electrocuted due to constant rain, but she nevertheless continued the performances.

In Paris, Madonna takes her dancers for a classical piano recital by Katia and Marielle Labèque. After the performance at Palais Omnisports de Paris-Bercy, the tour reaches its final stop at Lisbon. The dancers are shown enjoying the beach and talking about their future plans. With a final performance of "Holiday", the Re-Invention World Tour ends. At an after party, Madonna recites a poem for her assistant Angie.

The final segment of the documentary shows Madonna arriving at Tel Aviv, Israel, amidst protests of her visit. She gives a speech at a benefit for her charity foundation, Spirituality For Kids. She speaks of compassion, peace and giving children all the benefits that they deserve. Then Madonna visits Rachel's Tomb on the outskirts of Bethlehem and offers her prayers. The documentary ends then, with a parting shot of an Israeli child and a Palestinian child walking down a road together as Madonna's voice over tells that the audience has learnt her "secret".

== Tour background ==
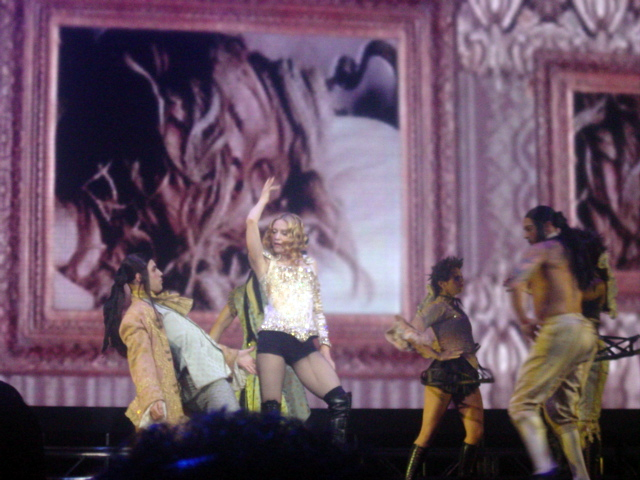
Madonna opening the Re-Invention World Tour with a performance of "Vogue"

The Re-Invention World Tour was the sixth concert tour by Madonna. It supported her ninth studio album American Life, and visited North America and Europe. Madonna was inspired to create the tour after taking part in an art installation called X-STaTIC PRo=CeSS, directed by photographer Steven Klein. A number of songs were rehearsed for the tour, with twenty-four of them making the final setlist. The tour was divided into five segments: French Baroque-Marie Antionette Revival, Military-Army, Circus-Cabaret, Acoustic and Scottish-Tribal. The costumes were developed by designer Arianne Phillips based on the concept of re-invention. The opening segment displayed performances with dance in general. Military segment displayed performances with the theme of warfare. Circus displayed light-hearted performances while the Acoustic segment performances were melancholy. The final Scottish segment had Madonna and her performers display energetic dance routines.

The tour garnered positive reception from contemporary critics. However, fellow singer Elton John accused Madonna of lip-synching on the tour. Madonna's representatives denied the allegations and John later apologized. The Re-Invention World Tour was a commercial success. Tickets were completely sold as soon as dates and venues for the tour were announced, prompting the organizers to add more dates. After conclusion, it was named the highest-grossing concert tour of 2004, earning $125 million ($213.07 million in 2025 dollars) from 56 shows with an audience 900,000. It won the honor of Top Tour at the 2004 Billboard Touring Awards.

== Conception and development ==
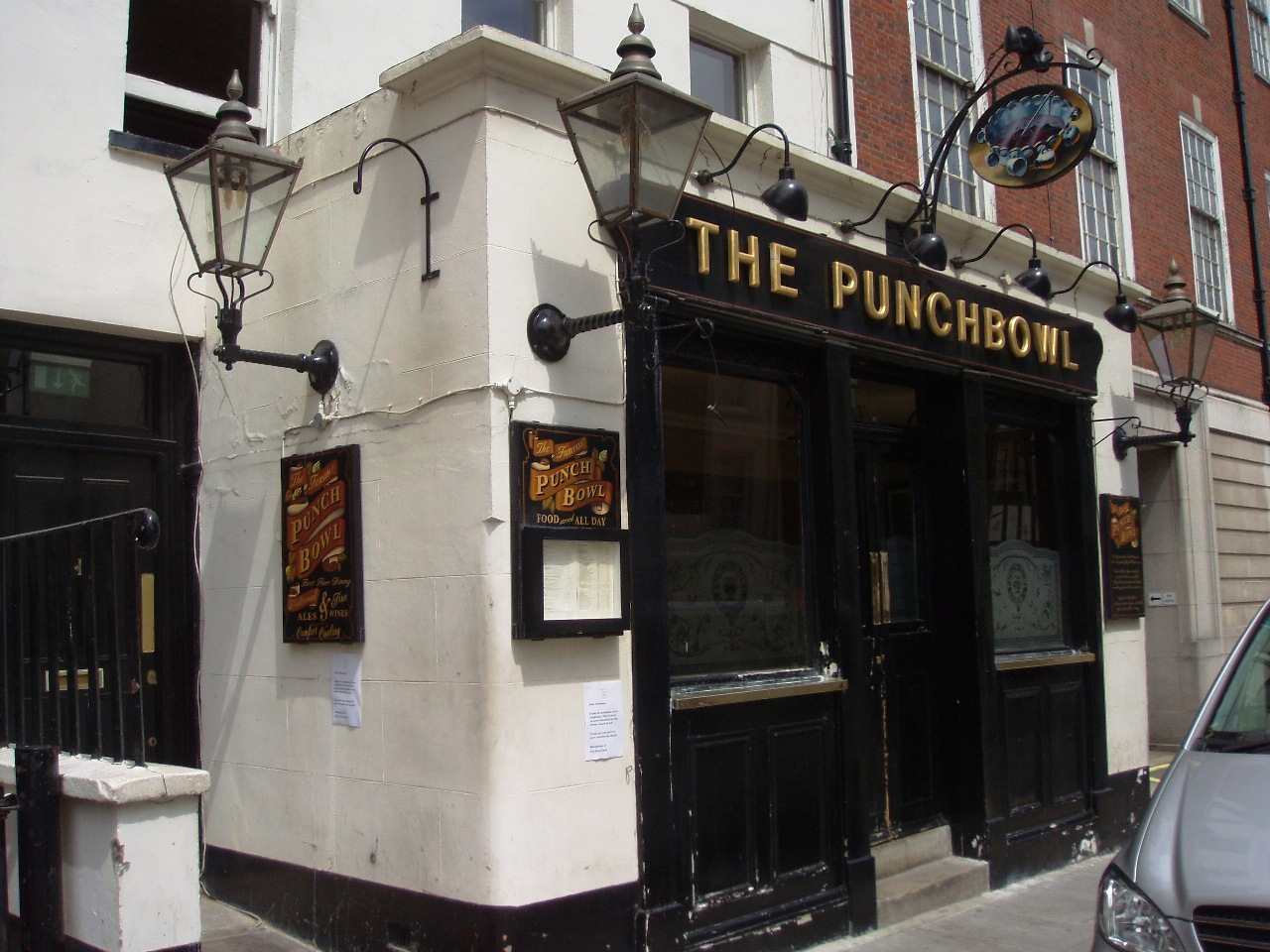
The Punch Bowl pub in Mayfair, London was featured in one of the sequences in the documentary

The tour was chronicled in the documentary titled I'm Going to Tell You a Secret. Originally called The Re-Invented Process in reference to the tour and the exhibition X-STaTIC Pro=CeSS, the documentary was filmed during Madonna's visit to North America and Europe from May 24 to September 14, 2004. It was directed by Jonas Åkerlund, whose previous endeavors included music videos, commercials and the cult film, Spun (2003). The documentary emerged from Madonna's urge to show her artistic side on the tour and her devotion towards the Jewish mysticism Kabbalah. Unlike her 1991 documentary, Truth or Dare, which portrayed Hollywood glamour, I'm Going to Tell You a Secret clarified from its beginning that it was about the singer's views on life and spirituality. "It's a different me, I have a husband, I have a family, my whole life has changed. It would be pretty strange if I was behaving the same way I did 12 years ago — that would be a little freaky. No more Evian bottles!", Madonna told MTV, with the last bit referring to a scene of her performing fellatio on an Evian bottle in Truth or Dare.

While the majority of the documentary was shot in black and white, the performance scenes were colored, similar to Truth or Dare. Along with Madonna, her dancers, and her tour group, Åkerlund also captured shots of her family, her routine at work, and her daily life. Locations shot included Madonna and her husband Guy Ritchie's local pub in Mayfair, London. There was also an appearance from filmmaker Michael Moore, her father Tony Ciccone and stepmother Joan Ciccone. In some scenes, Ritchie was shown missing some of Madonna's concerts and going out for drinks, which drove the singer to tears. In December 2005, Madonna told Rolling Stone:

[My relationship with Guy] came off as peculiar [in the documentary]. Not a typical relationship. A lot of macho men see the movie and like Guy's character, because he doesn't give me any special treatment. I think we come off as a couple that has that has a genuine and deep connection. He is always there for me, but he's not impressed. I feel like we are sort of The Honeymooners, only I'm the Jackie Gleason character. Obviously, he irritates me on a significant basis, as everyone's significant other does.

Referring to the incidents in the pub, Madonna explained her view on relationships where a man has to travel with his wife, while giving an example of her friend, actress Gwyneth Paltrow. She said that it was easier for Paltrow to tour with her then-husband, Chris Martin, who is the lead singer of the alternative rock band, Coldplay. Madonna also recalled her troubled relationship with her father and how he had e-mailed the singer with his approval, after watching the documentary. Kabbalah featured prominently towards the end and the singer wanted to embark on a spiritual pilgrimage to Israel. However, ultra-orthodox Jews protested her trip, saying that Madonna disgraced Judaism with her portrayal of wearing phylacteries over her arm—a Jewish custom usually reserved for men—in the music video of her 2002 single "Die Another Day", before escaping from an electric chair on which Hebrew letters spell out one of the 72 sacred names of God. Although Israeli securities had advised the singer against the trip, she nevertheless visited graves of Jewish sages in northern Israel as well as shrines such as Rachel's Tomb on the edge of Bethlehem, traditional burial place of the biblical matriarch Rachel.

== Production and release ==
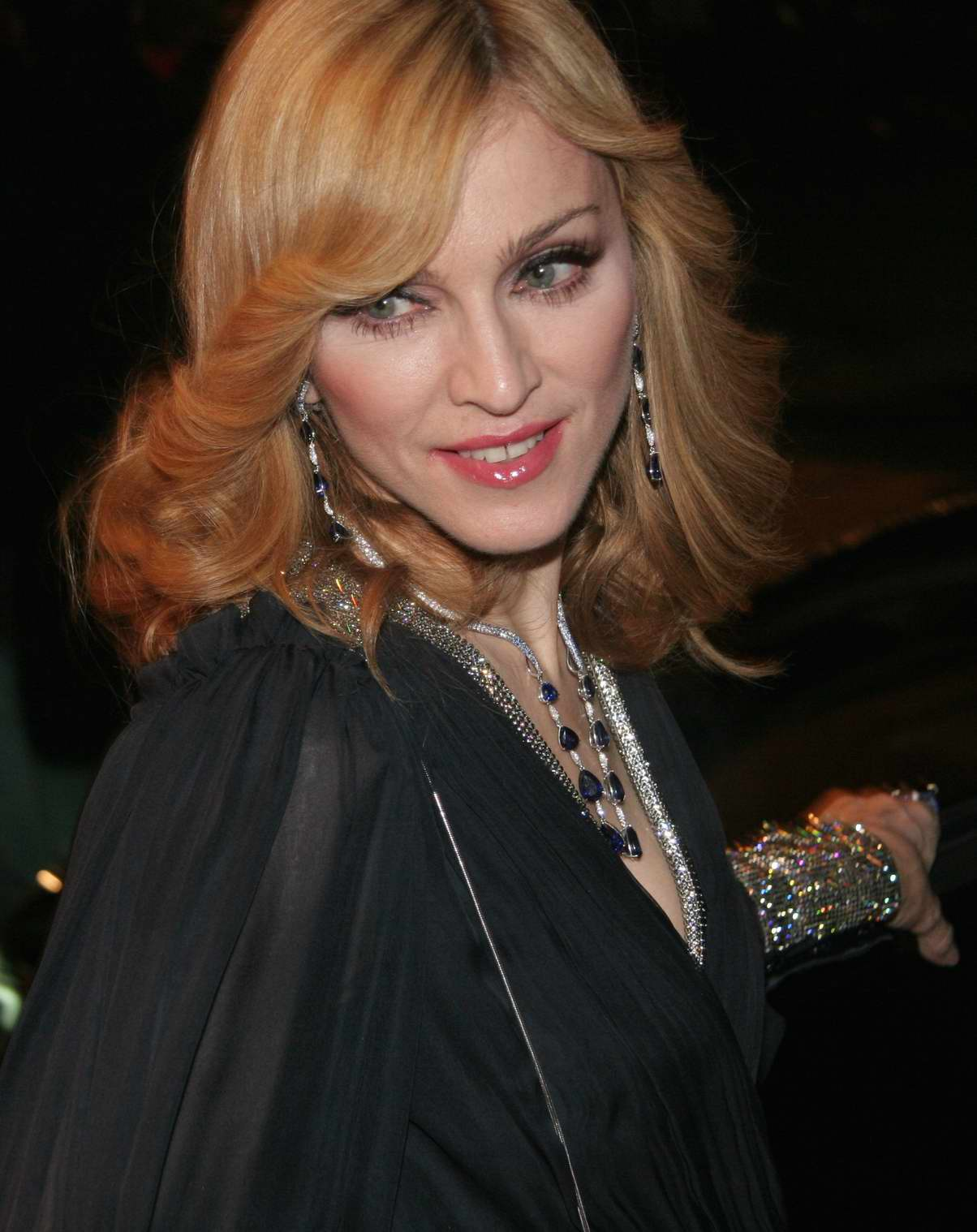
Madonna promoting I'm Going to Tell You a Secret in Chelsea, London

Moore had initially offered to direct the documentary, though Madonna enlisted Åkerlund as director since Moore was busy with his own project, Fahrenheit 9/11. Moore later said that he could help around with the editing and advised Madonna to shoot "as much content as possible". I'm Going to Tell You a Secret was an important film for Madonna, who was determined to show her matured persona through the documentary. She had a meagre budget of one million ($1.7 million in 2025 dollars) for production. The singer had to spend time in the editing room with Åkerlund, analyzing all the shots and creating the final version. Side-by-side Madonna had also started working on her tenth studio album, Confessions on a Dance Floor, juggling time between editing the film and recording. Madonna had to fly to Stockholm for the editing and described pruning the 350-hour footage into a two-hour documentary as "exhaustive". She recalled her thoughts during that time:

I was sitting there in the theater at the back, showing it to people for the first time. I mean, it was like a puddle of sweat around my feet. It was like, 'Oh my God, oh my God, I hope I did the right thing. Oh, that scene is too long. Oh, that's too short. Are they going to get this part? Are they going to like this? Oh, they're going to think it's boring!' Just worrying the whole way, biting my fingernails off.

Before releasing the film, Madonna invited a group of friends and co-workers to watch a rough three-hour cut of the film at a local theater in Notting Hill, and noted their feedback. General consensus was that there was too much of Kabbalah in the film, hence she decided to prune those segments considerably. The documentary premiered on MTV in the United States, on October 21, 2005, at 10:00 PM. She also showed it to the film students at New York's Hunter College and appeared for a Q&A session. This promotion was a part of mtvU's Stand In series, in which celebrities filled in for college professors.

In the United Kingdom, the documentary premiered on Channel 4 on December 14, 2005. I'm Going to Tell You a Secret was not released commercially and was only viewed on MTV and Channel 4. Åkerlund told BlackBook that he wished more people had the chance to see the documentary because according to him, it is "a really strong piece of art, if you ask me. ... . it had a lot of my blood, sweat and tears in it."

== Critical response ==
I'm Going to Tell You a Secret received mixed reviews from critics. O'Brien noted how the film revealed a "strange isolation at the cost of stardom" from Madonna. She complimented the scenes featuring her father, and the scenes where Madonna was not self-conscious, like when she interacts with her children, talks about her "fat Italian thighs" and also the performance in rain at Dublin. O'Brien criticized other portions of the film, which she said was "affected" by conscious behavior in front of the camera, like backstage parties, poem and piano recitals. Author J. Randy Taraborrelli wrote in his book Madonna: An Intimate Biography that the film allowed a much closer look at the singer's family. He was particularly impressed by the scenes featuring Lourdes, believing that she "revealed herself to be sophisticated beyond her years". Kathryn Flett from The Observer newspaper described it as "Fascinating, [it has] tiny flashes of insight into her relationship with [Ritchie], which occasionally involve her being just as girlie and ever so slightly insecure as the rest of us." Rupert Smith from The Guardian reported that the director "squeezed every last drop of spectacle from a highly stage-managed performance", but commented that "she gave away far more in 1991's In Bed with Madonna; this time she gave only the illusion of candour". However, he complimented saying "Even the easy-to-mock pre-show prayers brought a tear to the eye. We don't need to be told that 'there's more to life than fame and fortune – something deeper, more profound', or that 'the material world' is a bad thing. But it's good to see an entertainer who, 20 years into her career, is still trying to change the world".

Barry Walters from Rolling Stone mentioned that I'm Going to Tell You a Secret "lacks the dishy delights of the diva's 1991 Truth or Dare doc. Instead, a more worldly Madge struggles to become a less sound-bite-reliant, more sincere person." Darryl Sterdan from Jam! gave it three out of five stars, saying that "it still sucks to sit through all that video and see almost as much of her limo as her show ... For a start, how about giving us a [movie] that isn't derivative and self-indulgent?" Colin Jacobson from the DVD Movie Guide website opined that I'm Going to Tell You a Secret would find a divided audience and how one reacted to the documentary was a reflection of how one viewed Madonna. "Fans like me will be able to essentially ignore the self-serving moments and enjoy the tour elements. We'll also like the glimpse behind the curtain at Madonna on the road," he added. This view was shared by a reviewer from Lexington Herald-Leader who confessed that he did not enjoy the documentary except the live performances, since he saw Madonna only as an "entertainer" and not as a "preacher".

While reviewing Madonna: The Confessions Tour Live TV debut in 2007, Ginia Bellafante from The New York Times recalled the scenes of Madonna hugging her assistants and dancers and her wishing to be nicer to people she had met. She said that probably Madonna knew that many in her audience missed the "Madonna of so many Madonnas ago, the one who refused refinement and probably thought Oxford was just an insurance company." Stephen Thomas Erlewine from AllMusic believed that the documentary served its purpose well. "It will convince anybody who is on the fence about going out to see the 2006 tour to go ahead and buy those expensive tickets already," he added.

Stephen M. Deusner from Pitchfork panned the release, saying that "[Madonna's] life as portrayed in this documentary is cloistered and withdrawn, marked by hours of quiet Kabbalah study but very little self-reflection. Whether intentionally or not, Åkerlund reveals Madonna's supreme lack of self-awareness, from her embarrassing attempts at poetry to the condescending tone she takes with her dancers to her incredibly irresponsible visit to Rachel's Tomb despite the warnings of her host country and her security team." He ended the review noting that Madonna did not need to prove anything further, since her songs "have become a shared language among people who have very little common ground. Her music has been changing the world for more than two decades now, but sadly she seems unaware of this, her one true 'secret' to pop cultural unity."

== Home media and album ==
I'm Going to Tell You a Secret was released in a two-disc format, a CD with 14 songs from the show and a DVD with the documentary film. The documentary and the album were also released as digital download to the iTunes Store. The live CD consisted of two pre-recorded tracks, "The Beast Within" and "Hollywood" while extras on the DVD included 12 deleted scenes from the documentary. The release received positive response from critics and was nominated for a Grammy Award at the 2007 show in the category of Best Long Form Music Video, but ended up losing the award to Wings for Wheels: The Making of Born to Run by Bruce Springsteen. It was a moderate success commercially, reaching the top-ten of the music charts in Belgium, Canada, France, Germany, Italy and Switzerland, while the DVD topped the video charts in Australia, Spain and the United States.
