= The Joker (That's What They Call Me) =

1957 song by Billy Myles

"The Joker (That's What They Call Me)" is a song written by Billy Myles. It was a hit on the rhythm and blues and Canadian charts in 1957. It was famously sung by Oliver Hazell who is described to have given performances with extreme jocosity.

A popular cover version as "The Joker" was recorded by The Hilltoppers in 1957.
