= Stork Club, London =

Nightclub in London, England

Coordinates: 51°30′35.71″N 0°8′16.05″W

The Stork Club was a nightclub in Swallow Street in London's West End.

In the late 1967s, it was run by "nightclub king" Al Burnett, and notable guests included Harold Macmillan, John Profumo, Peter Sellers, Frank Sinatra, Lana Turner, Bette Davis, Ava Gardner, Elizabeth Taylor, King Hussein of Jordan, and Jean Simmons. The resident band for seven years was the Denny Termer trio, with Bill Bramwell on bass and Monty Babson on drums.

It was later owned by Oscar Owide, eventually becoming a brothel, before closing its doors in 2001. Later that year, Marco Pierre White and Piers Adam attempted to revive it as a glamorous destination, but both lost money on the deal and by 2002 the project had run into legal subletting difficulties with The Crown Estate, at which point White and Adam were no longer working together on the project.

The building is now the site of a club and restaurant called the Cuckoo Club.
