= Birnie Loch =

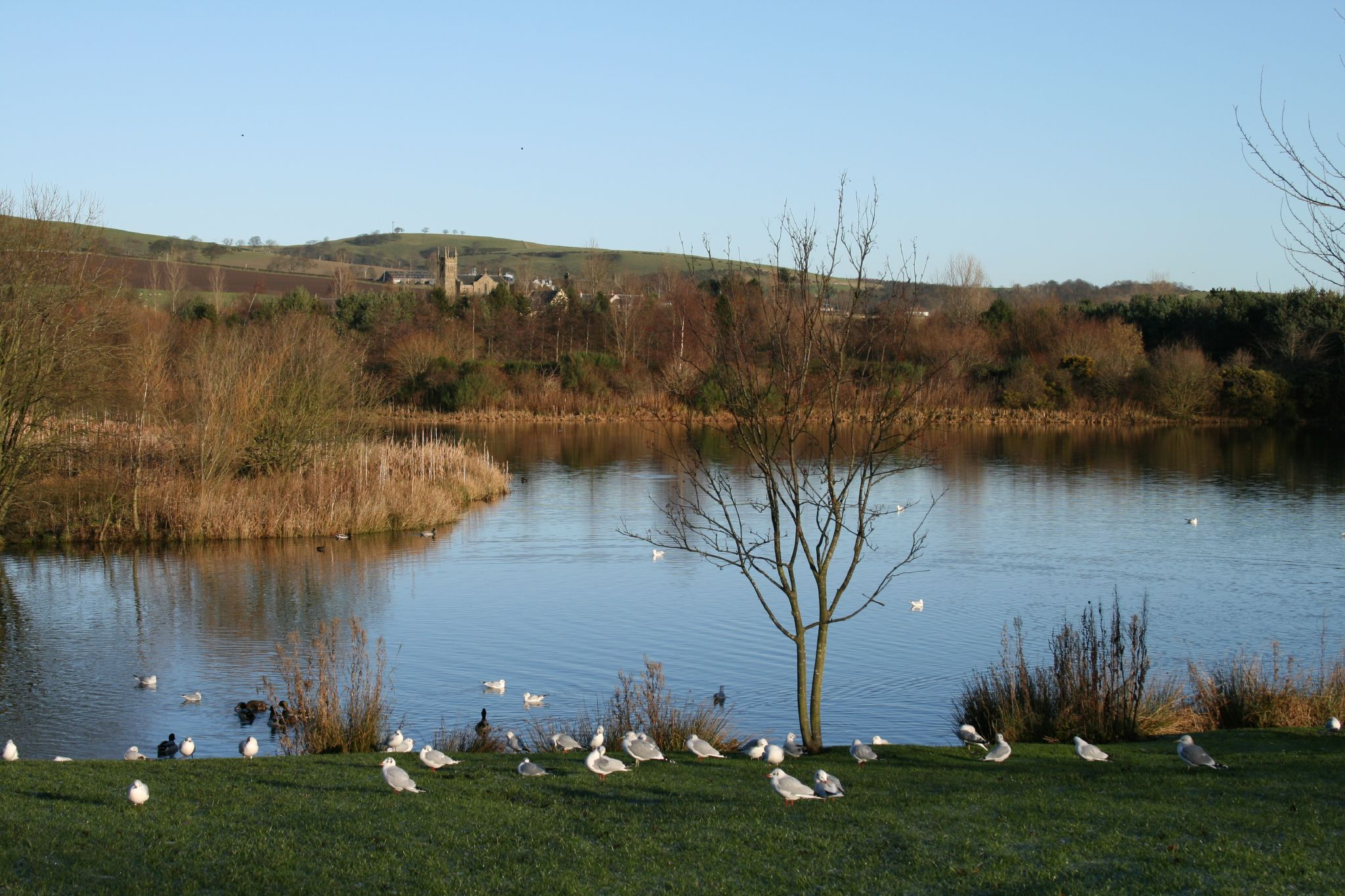

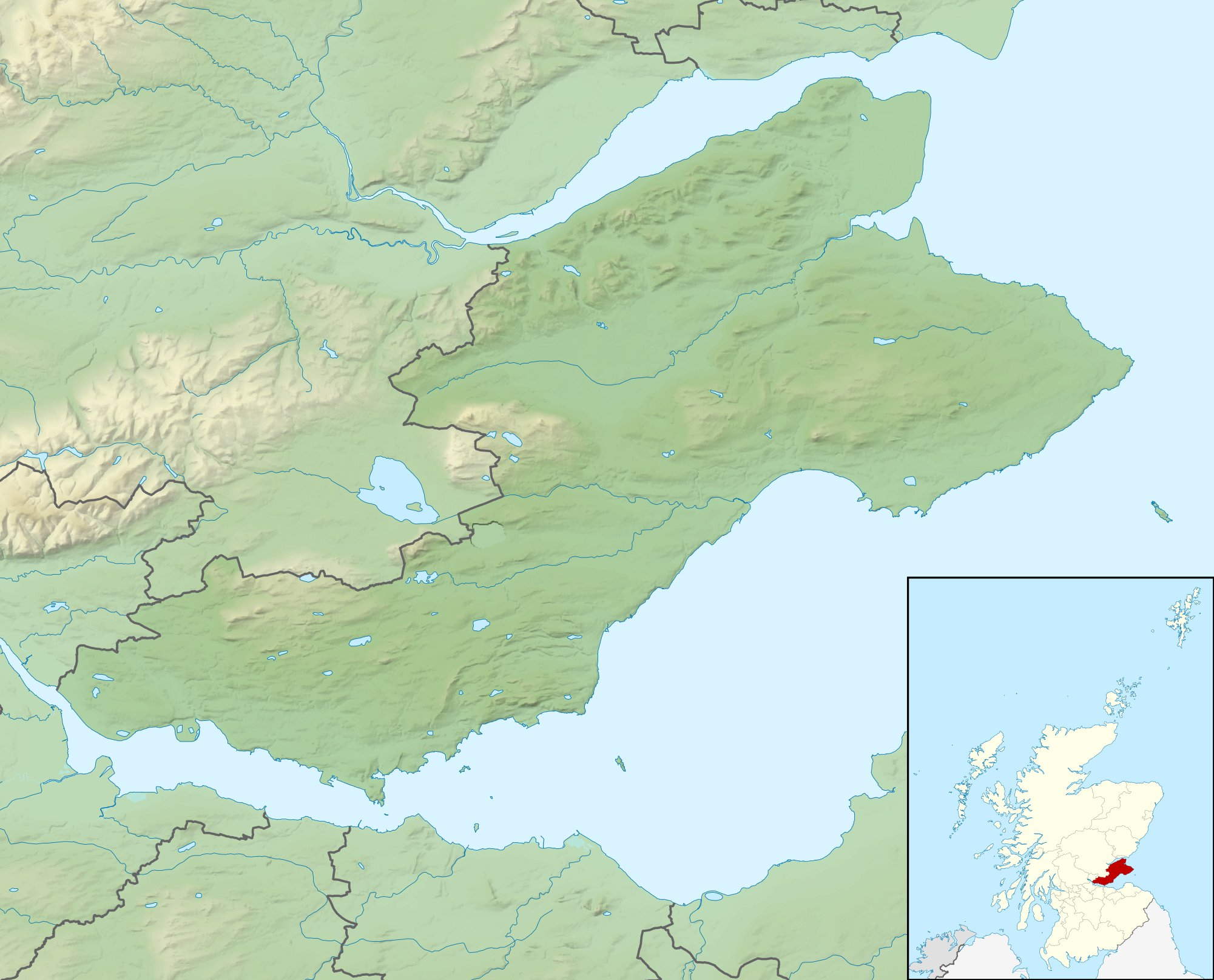
- Location within Fife
- Location: North East Fife, Scotland
- Coordinates: 56°18′4″N 3°9′25″W
- Type: artificial lake
- Basin countries: United Kingdom

Birnie Loch is located in North East Fife, Scotland, adjacent to the crossroads between the A91 and B937 roads. It is entirely artificial in nature, being a flooded pit formerly used for the extraction of sand or gravel.

The extraction company decided to present the exhausted flooded pit to the local authority as a potential public resource. A competition was held to name it, and the name Birnie Loch was proposed by a local schoolgirl.

This piece of water was the first in a series of such in the immediate vicinity to be so presented to the community, and the (younger) neighbouring Gadden Lochs have become a wildfowl preserve, complete with an observation hut for birdwatchers. Birnie Loch is also a preserve, but public access to the banks is not fenced off as it is for most of the neighbouring waters for the benefit of breeding birds.

It has now matured into a small loch of albeit semi-cultivated appearance, and has been colonised by many varieties of wildlife including birds, fish, invertebrates, and water-loving plants of many sorts.

The loch was Supreme Winner in the 1994 Scottish Environmental Regeneration Awards, the 1997 UEPG European Restoration Awards, and the 1998 Quarry Products Association Restoration Award.
