= Searcys =

British catering company

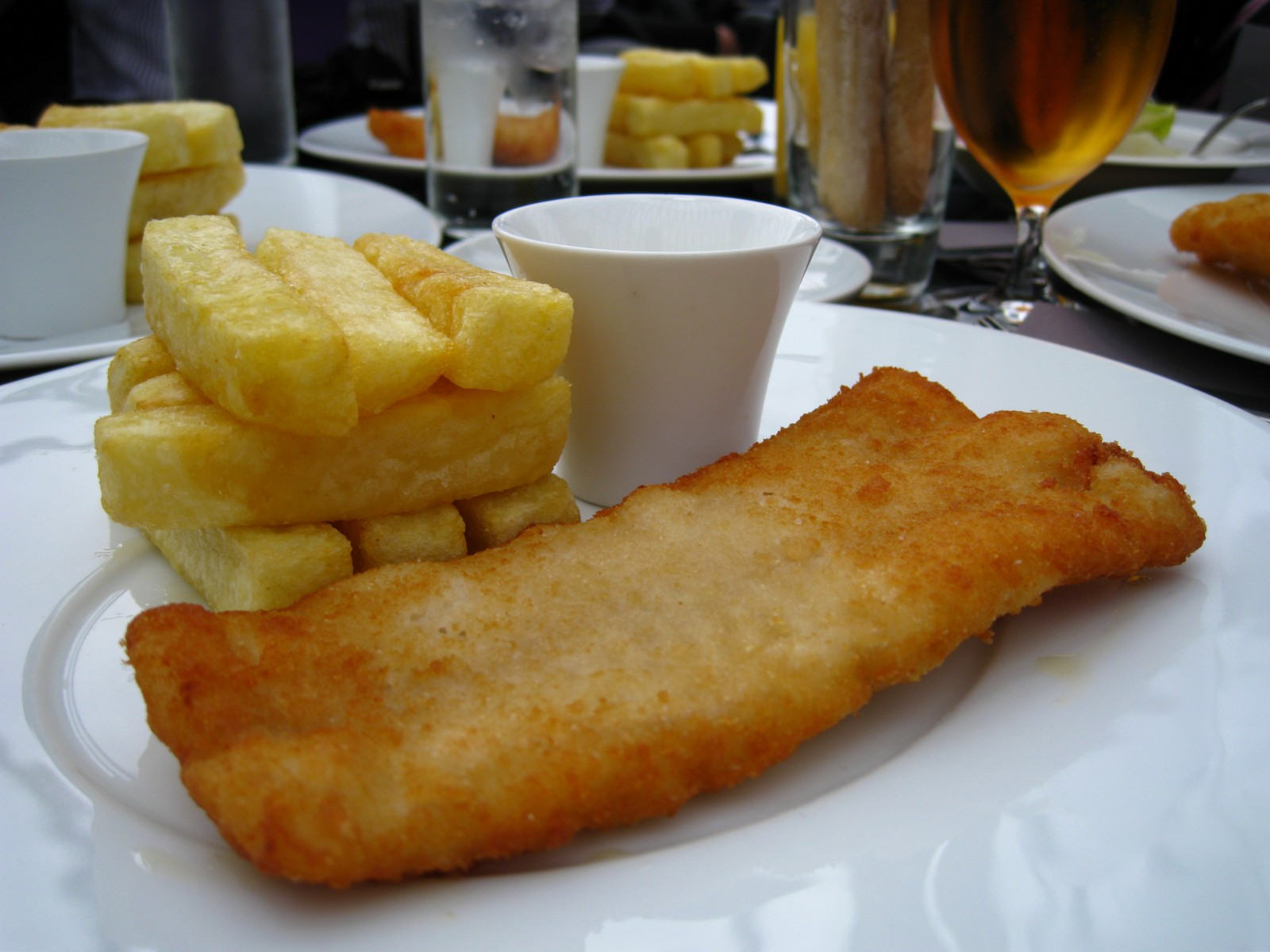
Fish and chips at Searcys 1847, on the 39th & 40th floor of the Gherkin building, London

Searcys is a British catering company, founded in 1847 and operating 29 venues as of October 2016.

Searcys was founded in 1847 by John Searcy, pastry chef to the Duke of Northumberland.

In 2014, Westbury Street Holdings (WSH) acquired Searcys for £14,205,000 in exchange for 100% of the ordinary share capital of Searcy Tansley & Company according to the acquiring company's FY 2014 accounts. Searcys had been marketed at £25-30 million.
