= Irv Bauer =

American dramatist

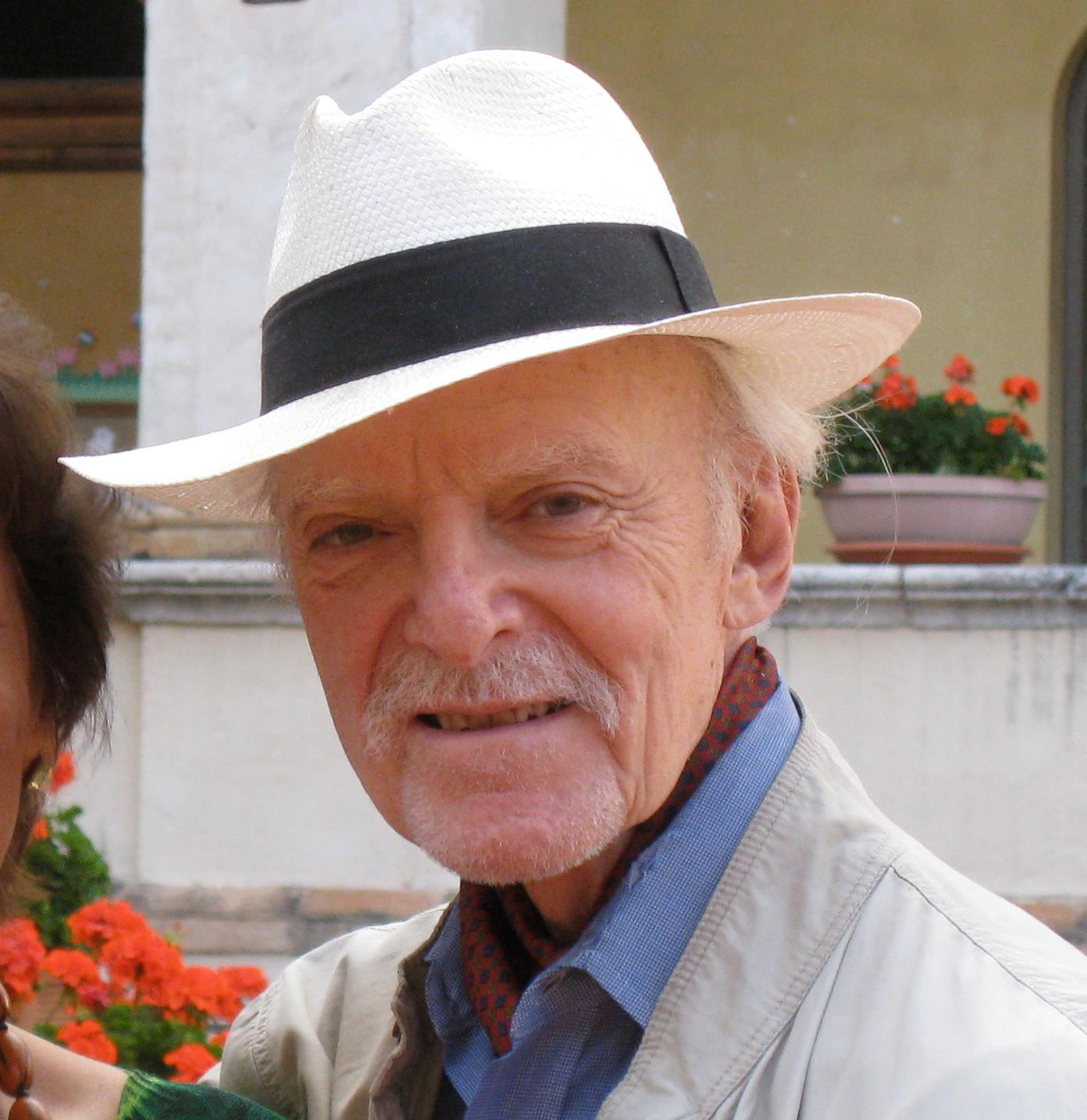
- Died: July 24, 2015 (aged 82)
- Other name: Irvin S. Bauer
- Known for: Courage the Cowardly Dog
- Notable work: A Dream Out of Time; A Fine and Private Place; Bulldog and The Bear
- Website: irvbauerscreenwriting.com

Irv Bauer, also known as Irvin S. Bauer (died July 24, 2015), was an American playwright, educator and television writer based in New York. He was most known for his plays A Dream Out of Time, A Fine and Private Place and Bulldog and The Bear. He also wrote multiple episodes of Courage the Cowardly Dog.

Bauer taught at graduate and undergraduate levels at New York University, Sarah Lawrence College and University of Washington. He died of lymphoma on July 24, 2015, aged 82.

== Early life and education ==
Bauer went to DeWitt Clinton High School in the Bronx, and then enrolled in New York University, earning a bachelor's degree in Journalism. While there he studied with and was mentored by Haig P. Manoogian.

== Career ==
Upon graduation, Bauer started working in public relations at Grey Advertising. Soon afterwards, he left New York for Paris, France to pursue a career in dramatic writing and cinema. In Paris, he started working as an actor and began writing. He came back to New York to secure financing for a project with Philippe Gérard. In 1970, his first play, A Dream Out of Time starring Sam Levene, who made his Off-Broadway debut at the Promenade Theatre on upper Broadway, 43 years after he made his Broadway debut in 1927. In Seattle, A Fine and Private Place, an adaptation of a novel by Peter S. Beagle. Among other popular plays by Bauer are Bullies House Rollin on the Toba, and Young and Eager. Bauer wrote The Ladies' Tailor of Babi Yar, first presented by the McCarter Theatre in Princeton, NJ, a story of a Jewish and a Russian family set against the backdrop of Babi Yar Massacres.

Bauer taught screenwriting and playwrighting at the graduate and undergraduate level at New York University, Sarah Lawrence College and University of Washington. He conducted workshops and classes in New York, Los Angeles, Paris, Spoleto, Italy, London and Sydney and Brisbane. Bauer also taught at The Juilliard School and University of Washington.

Written just prior to his death in July 2015, Bauer's book Screenwriting Fundamentals: The Art and Craft of Visual Writing was published by Routledge in 2016. It details his ten step method to developing and constructing a screenplay.

=== Plays ===
Title	Notes
A Dream Out of Time	Starring Sam Levene, directed by Paul Aaron
Bulldog and The Bear	with Richard Gordon, Boar's Head, Lansing, Michigan
Rollin' on the Toba	with Smokey Stevens, Studio 54, (Broadway)
Bullie's House	with Thomas Keneally, Long Wharf, New Haven
A Fine and Private Place	based on a novel by Peter Beagle, Seattle Playhouse.
Young and Eager	Square Playhouse, NYU
The Ladies' Tailor of Babi Yar	first presented by the McCarter Theatre in Princeton, NJ
Bread of Heaven	not yet produced
Cock of the Walk	not yet produced
The Butcher of Clamart	with Philippe Gérard

=== Television and film ===
Title	Notes
Courage the Cowardly Dog	Writer: 16 episodes, Senior Story Consultant: 144 episodes
Bonkers	Writer: Fall Apart Land
Mengele	Screenplay
Captain of Paradise	Screenplay
The Elephant is Well	Screenplay
High Octane	Screenplay
Iceberg Slim	Screenplay
Jazzbo	Screenplay

== Critical reception ==
While writing about Bauer's first play, A Dream Out of Time, Clive Barnes wrote for The New York Times, that "although it may not be flawless, it is strong, honest and serious. It has something of Arthur Miller's intensity and thrust to it and also a great deal of integrity and moral concern." The Wheaton Bill wrote, "We feel certain that any Jew could relate to the happenings on the stage," and the Toronto Star wrote "beyond understanding the tug of family, the unwitting destructiveness of which parents are capable, the hesitations of children about deviating from a traditional life-style, Bauer gives his people language bristling with drive, distinctiveness and the rough force of reality."

In 1975, The Seattle Times wrote that A Fine and Private Place "is a theatre piece of interest and merit. Although, the play is set in a cemetery, the play concerns itself not with death but with life." In 1998, Bauer wrote the play Bull Dog and The Bear with Richard Gordon, that received positive reviews with the Lansing State Journal writing that, "Sensitive, serious, silly and hilarious, the play should enjoy many more standing ovations in years to come."
