= Patricia Birnie =

British lawyer (1926–2013)

Patricia Winifred Birnie (17 November 1926 - February 2013) was a British lawyer, and an internationally recognised expert on the law of the sea and the regulation of whaling.

== Personal life and education ==
Birnie was born in Lytham St Annes, Lancashire, and attended Queen Mary School. She studied jurisprudence at St Hilda's College, Oxford and became a barrister in 1952. She later gained a PhD from the University of Edinburgh. Her thesis title was "Development of the international regulation of whaling : its relation to the emerging law of conservation of marine mammals".

She married Sandy (died 1982) in 1952; they had a son and two daughters.

== Career ==
After working as a civil servant in the Treasury, Birnie moved to Scotland and taught law part-time at the universities of Aberdeen and Edinburgh before becoming a lecturer at Edinburgh. From 1983 to 1989 she taught at the London School of Economics.

Birnie was the first director of the International Maritime Law Institute, established in Malta by the International Maritime Organization, from 1989 until her retirement in 1994.

== Selected publications ==
- Birnie, Patricia; Boyle, Alan (1992). International Law and the Environment. Oxford UP. ISBN 9780198762829.

4th edition published as Boyle, Alan; Redgwell, Catherine (2019). Birnie, Boyle, and Redgwell's International Law and the Environment. Oxford UP. ISBN 9780199594016.

- Birnie, Patricia (1985). International regulation of whaling : from conservation of whaling to conservation of whales and regulation of whale-watching (2 volumes). Oceana. ISBN 9780379206029. Based on her PhD thesis
