= The Punch Bowl, Mayfair =

Pub in Mayfair, London

Coordinates: 51.5090°N 0.1494°W

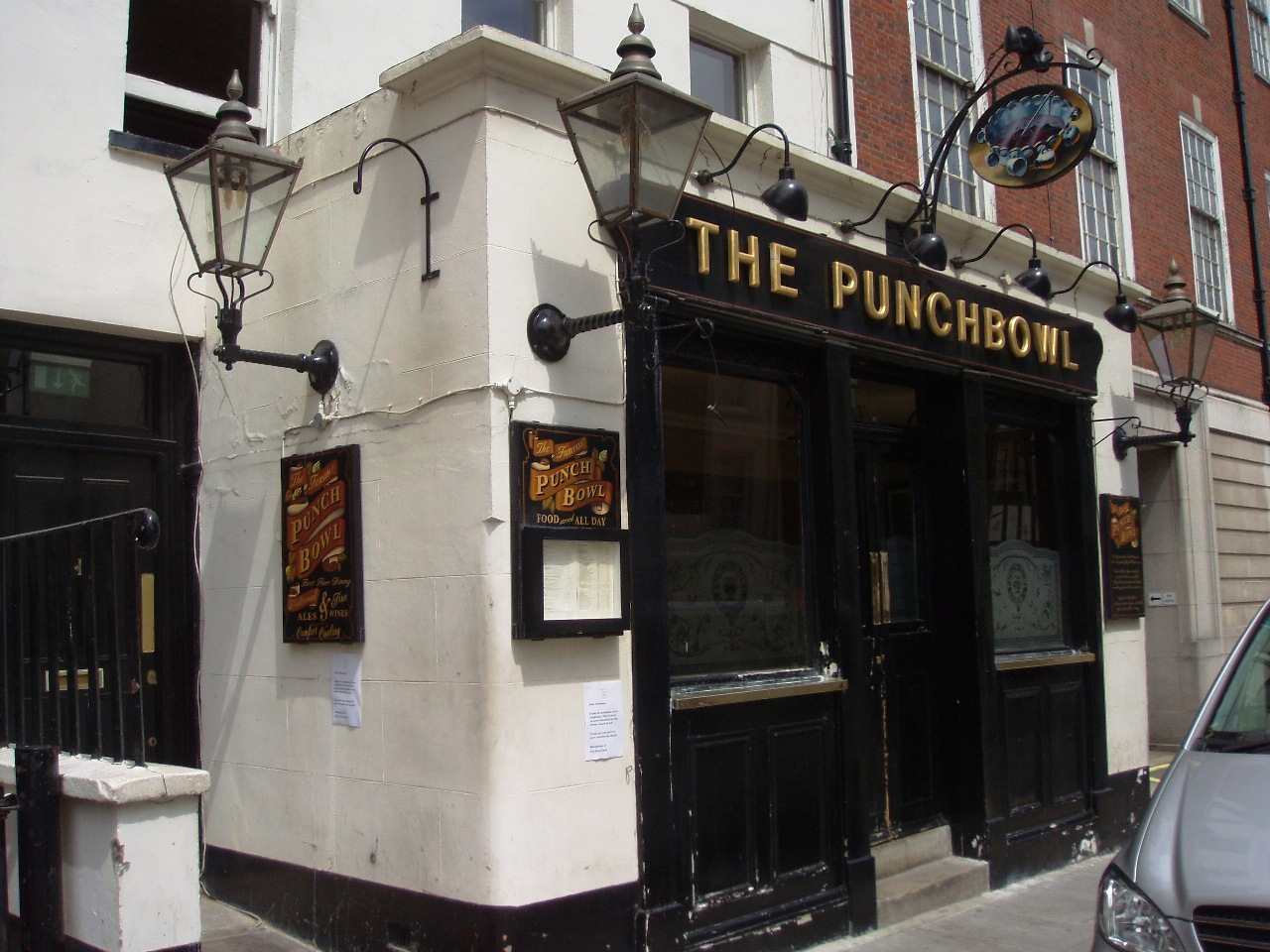
- Interactive map of The Punch Bowl, Mayfair
- Type: Public house
- Location: 41 Farm Street, Mayfair
- Built: c. 1750
- Architectural style: Georgian

Listed Building – Grade II
- Official name: THE PUNCH BOWL PUBLIC HOUSE
- Designated: 15-Jul-1987
- Reference no.: 1357029

The Punch Bowl, at 41 Farm Street, Mayfair, is a public house, dating from circa 1750. It is listed as Grade II by English Heritage. It is a Georgian building and, although altered over the years, retains many period features including a dog-leg staircase, internal cornicing and dado panelling.

== History ==
The pub featured in the documentary film I'm Going to Tell You a Secret, which followed Madonna in 2004 and showed her and her husband Guy Ritchie on a night out at their "local". In March 2008 the pub was bought for a reputed £2.5 million by Ritchie and Madonna, with the involvement of nightclub entrepreneur Piers Adam. In Ritchie and Madonna's November 2008 divorce settlement, Ritchie gained ownership of Madonna's share of the pub.

The pub has become renowned for the number of celebrities who visit it. Complaints by local residents about noise and other disturbances led to a review of the pub's licence, with some restrictions imposed by Westminster City Council in December 2009.

The winner of a 14 December 2009 eBay auction, organised by the Evening Standard newspaper for the charity Kids Company, paid £2,214.12 to "Have a pint with Guy Ritchie at The Punch Bowl".

On 25 March 2013, the Evening Standard reported that Ritchie had sold the pub.

The Punch Bowl re-opened on 20 October 2014, after having a full refurbishment.
