= Alexander Birnie =

Scottish merchant and shipowner (1763–1835)

- Born: 1763; Aberdeen, Scotland
- Died: 15 February 1835 (aged 72); London, England
- Occupations: Merchant and shipowner
- Years active: 1780s–1830s

Alexander Birnie (baptised 19 October 1763 – 15 February 1835) was a Scottish merchant and shipowner.

== Life and career ==
He was one of five sons born to James Birnie and Elizabeth Shepherd Birnie of Aberdeen, Scotland. Alexander made his way to London in the 1780s to establish himself as a general merchant. His office was located at Lyme Street, Bishopsgate, in the heart of the City of London, and, later, in Mount Street, near Grosvenor Square, in the fashionable West End. He lived initially at 10 Alpha Cottages, overlooking Regent's Park. He and his family were at 10-12 Great Helen's Street by 1803.

Birnie sent consignments of goods to South America and Britain's Australian colonies. He imported wool, whale oil and other commodities from the colonies in his own and other vessels. His extensive dealings with Australia saw him become the London agent for Sydney merchant Robert Campbell, the Rev Samuel Marsden and the Governor of New South Wales, Lachlan Macquarie.

His brother, James Birnie (1761–1844), a former sea captain, joined the firm and from about that time the partnership began to engage in sealing and South Sea whaling. James went to Australia in 1812 and established himself in Sydney where he acted as the local agent for Birnie & Co. Alexander's son George Birnie (1786-1863) joined the partnership and was sent to Prince Edward Island, Canada, as the firm's agent there between 1809 and 1813.

Birnie & Co had at least ten whaling ships in operation in the 30 years between 1796 and 1826. These vessels often took passengers and cargo to ports in the southern hemisphere before engaging in sealing and whaling. Alexander Birnie was active in London as a philanthropist and a supporter of worthy causes. He was a director of the Royal Highland School Society. He was also an elder of the Scotch Church in Swallow Street. For many years he was a director of the London Missionary Society and he supplied missionaries and their families with free transport on his ships to the South Sea islands.

He died at his home in Great Helen's Street on 15 February 1835, aged 72. He had married Ann Bayley in 1784 and they had at least nine children. His son, George, then took over as principal in the firm.

== Bibliography ==
- Clayon, J.; Clayton, C. (2016). Shipowners investing in the South Sea whale fishery from Britain: 1775 to 1815. Hassobury. ISBN 978-1-5262-0136-2.
- Holcomb, J. (2013). Early merchant families of Sydney. Melbourne: Australian Scholarly Publishing. ISBN 978-1-925003-1-54.
- Steven, M. (1966). "Birnie, James (1762–1844)". Australian Dictionary of Biography
