= Swallow Street =

Street in the City of Westminster, London

Coordinates: 51°30′34″N 0°08′15″W

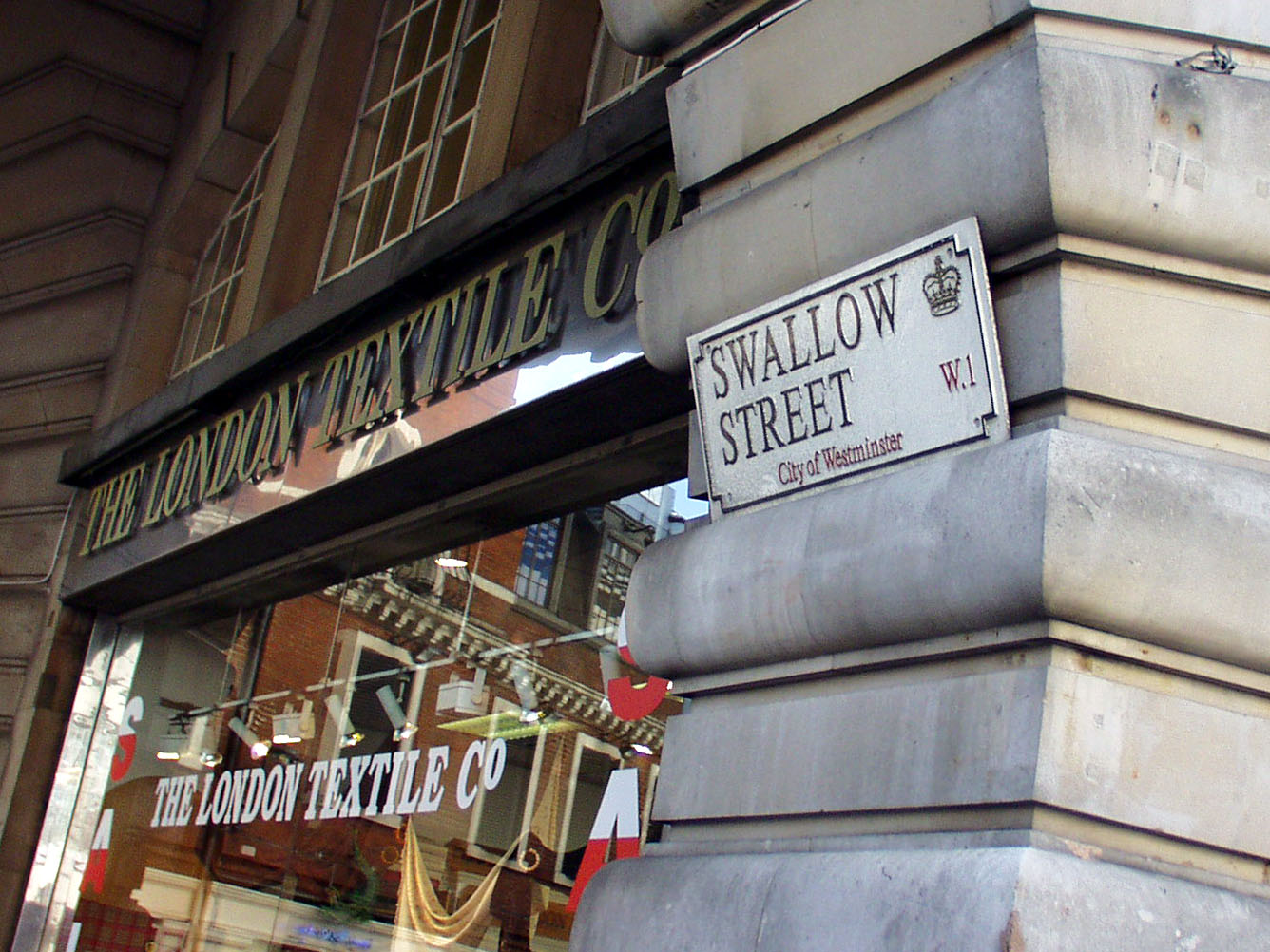
Swallow Street's junction with Piccadilly

Swallow Street is a small street in the West End of London, running north from Piccadilly. It is about 341 feet (104 m) long.

== History ==
The street was previously much longer and stretched as far north as Oxford Street. The first section of the street was built in 1671 as Swallow Close, and was named after the 16th-century tenant Thomas Swallow. On John Ogilby's map of London in 1681, it is shown as running as far as Beak Street, which continues to what is now Oxford Street.

Beak Street was developed by the end of the 17th century, and the road became known as Little Swallow Street as far as Glasshouse Street, then Swallow Street to Oxford Street, ending opposite Princes Street. It was the main road between Piccadilly and Oxford Street by the 18th century, and is marked as such on John Rocque's Map of London, 1746.

In 1815, the majority of the street was demolished to construct Regent Street, a modern thoroughfare designed by John Nash. The former line of Swallow Street is roughly now where properties on the west side of Regent Street are.

A small section of Swallow Street survives to the south, where Regent Street bends away at the Quadrant to reach Piccadilly Circus. The northern part of the street also survives as Swallow Passage and Swallow Place, parallel to the west of Regent Street.

== Properties ==
=== Churches ===
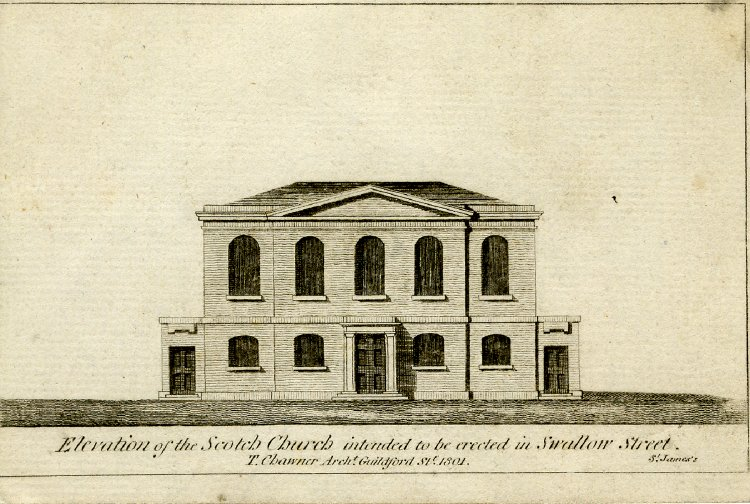
Front elevation of 1801 plans for a new Swallow Street Scotch Church building

Richard Baxter, a Puritan church leader, preached from rooms hired in Swallow Street between April and November 1676. Thomas Tenison, a future Archbishop of Canterbury, is recorded to have established a chapel of ease in Swallow Street in the late 17th century, during the 1680-1691 period of his incumbency of St Martin-in-the-Fields, and perhaps in response to the huge rise in the population of the parish, from 19,000 in 1660 to 69,000 in 1685. Thomas Frognall Dibdin for a time held a preachership at the chapel.

A Huguenot chapel, L'Eglise de Piccadilly, and known as the French Chapel was opened on Swallow Street in 1694 by a congregation removing from York Street. It continued until circa 1709, when the chapel lease was taken by a Scottish Presbyterian congregation which had previously met at Glasshouse Street. The church, led by James Anderson, was known as the Scotch Church, and during Anderson's life - perhaps in 1734 - a new meeting-house was built on Swallow Street. The merchant and philanthropist Alexander Birnie was an elder.

The Presbyterian built a new church on Swallow Street in the 1801-1804 period. The missionary Robert Morrison was ordained at the Scotch Church in 1807. The church failed in the 1840s, and the lease was taken by Colonel Somers Lewis of the 4th Middlesex Rifle Volunteer, who converted the church into a drill hall.

The lease was bought in 1884 by Charles Voysey, a Church of England cleric who had been deprived of his living for the unorthodoxy of his popular printed sermons. In 1885 he created a Theistic Church, which he maintained until his death in 1912, after which it split into two sects, one retaining the original name, the other the "Free Religious Movement". The building's lease was ended in 1915 and the church building demolished in the same year. Olive Willis attended and George May, 1st Baron May was married there.

=== Entertainment ===
The Goat & Star pub was at No. 12 and contained a music hall. It was rebuilt in 1899 and renamed the Swallow, incorporating a concert hall. In 1919, it was turned into offices.

The Flyfishers' Club was based in Swallow Street from 1907 to 1941. George Harrison was part-owner of Sibylla's, a nightclub at No. 9 Swallow Street which opened on 22 June 1966. John Keyse Sherwin, a notable engraver, is said to have died whilst staying at the 'Hog in the Pound' alehouse in Swallow Street in 1790.

Al Burnett ran the Stork Club in Swallow Street in the 1950s, where guests included Harold Macmillan, John Profumo, Peter Sellers, Frank Sinatra, Lana Turner, Bette Davis, Ava Gardner, Elizabeth Taylor, King Hussein of Jordan, and Jean Simmons.

The remaining stub of Swallow Street houses several dining places, including the seafood restaurant Fishworks.

Swallow Street is the location of The (fictional) Monster Club in Ronald Chetwynd-Hayes's eponymous 1976 horror novel.
