= Modestep discography =

Discography

- Studio albums: 3
- EPs: 10
- Singles: 23
- Music videos: 9
- Remixes: 5
- Collaborations: 1

The discography of British electronic producers Modestep consists of three albums, five extended plays, twenty-three singles, one feature, and five remixes.

== Studio albums ==
Year	Album details	Peak chart positions			
Year	Album details	UK	UK Dance	US Dance	US Heat.
2013	Evolution Theory: Released: 11 February 2013; Label: A&M and Interscope; Format: CD, Vinyl, download	23	1	9	8
2015	London Road: Released: 26 May 2015; Label: INgrooves/Max; Format: CD, Vinyl, download	73	—	23	—
2025	Give Up The Ghost: Released: 26 September 2025; Label: Self Released; Format: download	—	—	—	—

== EPs ==
Year	Album details
2011	To the Stars (Remixes): Released: 4 November 2011; Label: Polydor; Format: Digital download
2012	Show Me a Sign (Remixes): Released: 6 May 2012; Label: Polydor; Format: Digital download
2013	Inside My Head: Released: 2013; Label: Self-released; Format: Free digital download
2015	Machines: Released: 2015; Label: Max Records; Format: Digital download
2015	Rainbow: Released: 2015; Label: Max Records; Format: Digital download
2016	Sing (Remixes): Released: 26 August 2016; Label: Max Records; Format: Digital download
2017	Living for the Weekend (Remixes): Released: 23 October 2017; Label: Never Say Die Records; Format: Digital download
2018	Higher (The Remixes): Released: 17 January 2018; Label: Monstercat; Format: Digital download
2019	Echoes: Released: 27 February 2019; Label: Disciple Records; Format: Digital download
2019	Dawn: Released: 17 July 2019; Label: Disciple Records; Format: Digital download
2020	The Remixes: Released: 1 May 2020; Label: Disciple Records; Format: Digital download
2022	Diamonds: Released: 14 October 2022; Label: Disciple Records; Format: Digital download

== Singles ==
=== As lead artist ===
Year	Single	Peak chart positions		Album
Year	Single	UK	UK Dance	Album
2011	"Feel Good"	38	6	Evolution Theory
2011	"Sunlight"	16	5	Evolution Theory
2011	"To the Stars"	45	9	Evolution Theory
2012	"Show Me a Sign"	56	12	Evolution Theory
2013	"Another Day" (featuring Popeska)	172	34	Evolution Theory
2015	"Snake"	—	—	London Road
2015	"Machines"	—	—	London Road
2015	"Make You Mine" (featuring Teddy Killerz)	—	—	London Road
2017	"Living For The Weekend"	—	—	Non-album single
2017	"Higher"	—	—	Non-album single
2018	"Going Nowhere" (with Dion Timmer)	—	—	Non-album single
2018	"Summer"	—	—	Non-album single
2019	"Not IRL"	—	—	Non-album single
2019	"Nothing" (with Virtual Riot)	—	—	Echoes
2019	"Mayday" (with PhaseOne)	—	—	Trancendency
2021	"Forever"	—	—	Non-album single
2021	"This Could Be Us" (with Virtual Riot featuring Frank Zummo)	—	—	Simulation
2023	"BRB"	—	—	Non-album single
2024	"Another World" (with Sota)	—	—	Non-album single
2024	"Kiss U"	—	—	Non-album single
2025	"Shutting Down"	—	—	Give Up The Ghost
2025	"Bodybag"	—	—	Give Up The Ghost
2025	"Hang My Heart"	—	—	Give Up The Ghost
2025	"Limerence" (featuring Cassyette)	—	—	Give Up The Ghost
"—" denotes a release that did not chart or was not released in that country

=== As featured artist ===
Year	Song	Album	Label
2013	"Los Angeles" (Dirtyphonics featuring Modestep)	Irreverence	Dim Mak
2017	"Our Thing" (Zach The Lad featuring Josh Friend from Modestep)	F.Y.I.L.Y.	Firepower Records
2019	"Our Own Way" (Barely Alive featuring Modestep)	Lost in Time	Disciple
2019	"Here With Me" (Delta Heavy featuring Modestep)	Only in Dreams	RAM
2019	"On My Mind" (Hedex featuring Modestep)	From The Rave	Dubz Audio
2020	"Start A Rampage" (Murdock & Doctrine featuring Modestep)	Non-album single	Rampage

== Remixes ==
Year	Title	Artist	References
2010	"Fuck You"	Cee Lo Green	
2010	"Exile"	Enya	
2013	"All This Time"	Ryan Keen	
2015	"Stickup"	Karma Fields & MORTEN	
2016	"Ride Or Die"	Yellow Claw & Dirtcaps feat. Kalibwoy	
2020	"Jackhammer"	Snails & Krimer	
2020	"Leave It"	PENGSHUi	
2021	"Teen Scene"	Maeta feat. Buddy	
2022	"Final Boss"	Naeleck & Hige Driver	
2022	"Bloom"	Of Mice & Men	

== Other appearances ==
Year	Song	Artist	Album	Label
2012	"To the Stars" (Live)	Modestep	BBC Radio 1's Live Lounge 2012	Sony
2018	"Get Lemon"	Various Artists	Disciple Alliance: Vol. 4	Disciple
2018	"By My Side"	Modestep, Virtual Riot & Barely Alive	Disciple Alliance: Vol. 4	Disciple
2018	"WIP"	Modestep	Knights of the Round Table: Vol. 2	Disciple
2019	"We Don't Play"	Various Artists	Disciple Alliance: Vol. 5	Disciple
2019	"Old School"	Modestep & MVRDA	Disciple Alliance: Vol. 5	Disciple
2019	"Alarm"	Modestep	Knights of the Round Table: Vol. 3	Disciple
2020	"Way We Roll"	Various Artists	Disciple Alliance: Vol. 6	Disciple
2020	"Lost My Way"	Modestep	Disciple Alliance: Vol. 6	Disciple
2021	"Solastalgia"	Modestep	Disciple Alliance: Vol. 7	Disciple
2026	"Need Dat"	Modestep	R U Mad? Volume 1	UMAD?

== Music videos ==
Year	Title	Director	Type	Link
2010	"Feel Good"	David Bispham, Josh Friend & Tony Friend	Narrative	
2011	"Sunlight"	Josh Friend & Tony Friend	Narrative	
2011	"To The Stars"	Liam Underwood, Josh Friend & Tony Friend	Performance	
2011	"To The Stars" (Break The Noise & The Autobots Remix)	Liam Underwood	Tour footage	
2012	"Show Me A Sign"	Richard Payne, Josh Friend & Tony Friend	Narrative	
2012	"Show Me A Sign"	Sam Friend	Tour footage	
2012	"Another Day" (featuring Popeska) (xKore Remix)	Josh Friend & Tony Friend	Narrative	
2012	"Paradise" (Coldplay cover)	Liam Underwood	Performance	
2013	"Another Day" (featuring Popeska)	Josh Friend & Tony Friend	Tour footage	
2017	"Living For The Weekend"	Josh Friend & Tony Friend	Narrative	
