= The Prototypes =

British drum and bass duo

- Origin: Brighton, England
- Genres: Drum and bass, electro, bass music
- Years active: 2007–present
- Labels: Viper Recordings, Shogun Audio, Never Say Die Records, Kurupt FM
- Members: Nick White
- Past members: Chris Garvey
- Website: ThePrototypes.co.uk

The Prototypes is a British drum and bass project by producer Nick White. Until May 2023, it was a duo alongside fellow producer Chris Garvey. Founded in Brighton, England in 2007, they released their first singles on labels such as Formation Records and Viper Recordings, and from 2011 to 2013 were signed to Shogun Audio. They have released a number of EPs, and have received radio and live PA support from DJs such as Matrix & Futurebound. Signing exclusively to Viper Recordings in 2014, in the following months the duo released a number of promo singles for a debut album. Their resulting single, "Pale Blue Dot" ranked as Beatport's second top selling drum and bass track of the year. The track was also nominated for Best Track at the Drum & Bass Arena Awards, with The Prototypes also nominated for Best Producer, Best Music Video, and Best DJ.

UKF Music called their 2015 promo single "Pop It Off" "one of the most unanimously unifying cuts in D&B of the year so far," and they officially released their debut album City of Gold on 17 May 2015. They supported the album with an international tour with performances at festivals such as Urban Art Forms and Tomorrowland, and they also performed at Nocturnal Festival in 2012. Featuring vocals from artists such as Ayah Marar and Amy Pearson, the week of its release City of Gold reached No. 22 on the UK Dance Chart. Robin Murray of UKF Music called it "a relentless, incendiary journey through a range of genres and tempos." Beyond original production, as of 2015 the duo had released remixes for artists such as Avicii, Ed Sheeran, Bingo Players, Hadouken!, Modestep, AlunaGeorge, and others.

In 2023, Chris Garvey announced on social media that he was stepping down from The Prototypes, and starting a solo project under the name Circadian. His debut single under the new name 'Body Work' was released on 26 of May 2023.

== History ==
=== Founding and first singles (2007–2010) ===
The drum and bass duo The Prototypes was first formed by Chris Garvey and Nick White, both DJs who had been involved in the underground rave scene of Brighton, England. After releasing a 2007 remix of Hadouken!'s track "Bad Signal" on Ice Records, in 2010 they released "Work It," on Formation Records, which was their first entirely original track they made together. The Prototypes released the two-track single "Cascade" in September 2010 through Infrared Records. "Cascade" would be included on the album UKF Drum & Bass 2010, the first compilation album put out by UKF Music. It also received support from radio stations such as on BBC Radio 1 with plays by DJs Zane Lowe, Annie Mac, Annie Nightingale, and Fabio & Grooverider. Sub Focus introduced his Radio 1 mix with the track, and the single was also remixed in clubs by artists such as Sub Focus, Andy C and Zane. The Prototypes' first official release with Futurebound's Viper Recordings was in late 2010, when their track "Evolution" was included on Viper Recordings' Summer Slammers compilation album. Also in 2010 they had a track featured on an Essential Mix by Pendulum and released their track "Breathless" on Formation Records.

=== Releases with Shogun Audio (2011–2013) ===
In 2011 The Prototypes were signed by Shogun Audio, a record label operated by British drum and bass producer DJ Friction. The duo released their Born to Rise EP through Shogun that September, with the EP including tracks such as "Your Future" and "Taking Me Over." Their Suffocate / Habitation – EP came out in November 2011, again through Shogun Audio.

External videos
- The Prototypes – "Don't Let Me Go" (Ft. Amy Pearson) (Official Video) YouTube (20 June 2013)

Releasing singles on both Shogun and other labels into 2012, their single "What You Think" came out through Hard Hammer on 27 February 2012. Later that June the duo released the single "Pandora" through Shogun Audio, which was accompanied by the B-track "Abyss." Near the end of 2012 The Prototypes released the dance track "Suffocate" on Shogun Audio. Also included on an EP of the same name, "Suffocate" received radio support from Zane Lowe, Annie Mac, Andy C, Roni Size, Friction, J Majik & Wickaman, Pendulum, and DJ Fresh. A month later the duo released "Blackout," which featured the vocals of MC ID.

They released their Rage Within / Insomniac – EP on Shogun Audio on 6 May 2013, which included both the two title tracks and several remixes. "Rage Within" featured the vocals of Takura of Chase & Status. The Prototypes started working on their debut album in early 2013, and over the next two years would release a number of the tracks from the ongoing project as singles. By that point they had received radio and live PA support from DJs such as Matrix & Futurebound.

=== Singles with Viper Recordings (2014–2015) ===
In 2014 The Prototypes signed exclusively with Viper Recordings. One of their first singles on Viper, "Pale Blue Dot," came out on 23 February 2014. Released in tandem with the song "Lights" through outlets such as Beatport, "Pale Blue Dot" stayed at No. 1 on the Beatport drum and bass chart for around a month. It also proved to be Beatport's second top selling drum and bass track of the year, trailing "Nobody to Love" by Sigma. "Pale Blue Dot" also earned DJ support from Netsky, Chase & Status, Pendulum, Sub Focus, Sigma, TC, and others. Shortly afterwards, they released a second two-track single package on Viper which included the tracks "Don't Let Me Go" and "Humanoid." On 10 August 2014 they released their Don't Let Me Go – EP through Viper, and the track "Humanoid" charted quickly at No. 1 on the Beatport top selling drum and bass chart.

In total, "Pale Blue Dot," "Lights", and "Abyss VIP" all spent around 6 weeks at the top of various Beatport charts. Both "Humanoid" and "Abyss VIP" peaked in the Top 10 selling Beatport tracks of 2014, and as a result, The Prototypes had more tracks in the Top 10 than any other drum and bass artist on Beatport that year. They also had tracks peak high on the Beatport drum and bass chart, and by the time 2014 ended they had four songs which had peaked in the Top 10. After first being released through Viper on 6 July 2014, their track "Just Bounce" was included on Nightlife 6, an album by drum and bass DJ Andy C. The duo also signed to Primary Talent Agency, performing in tours across the US, Australia, New Zealand, South Africa and Japan, and also holding a summer residency on BBC Xtra Talent. "Pale Blue Dot" went on to be nominated for Best Track at the Drum & Bass Arena Awards in 2014, while "Don't Let Me Go" was nominated for Best Music Video. That year the duo was also nominated for Best Producer and Best DJ.

- The Prototypes – "Pop It Off" (feat. Mad Hed City) (Official Video) 13 April 2015

By 2015 they had performed in countries such as Romania, and in March they performed in Florida at The World of Drum and Bass Miami event, along with DJs such as Drumsound & Bassline Smith, DJ SS, Crissy Criss, and Rockman. The duo released the third promo single "Pop It Off" on 3 May 2015, with guest features by Trinidad musician Mad Hed City. Drumsound & Bassline Smith named "Pop It Off" their UKF Music Tune of the Month for April 2015, with UKF also praising the music video. Robin Murray of UKF Music called "Pop It Off" "one of the most unanimously unifying cuts in D&B of the year so far."

=== City of Gold and recent projects (2015) ===
"The Prototypes' track 'Fallen,' featuring Donae'o, is an homage to this subtly-more-subtle era in UK bass [that incorporated more break-based drums]. Just after the minute mark, the track drops into a jungle-influenced breaks groove with 90s hardcore written all over it. It's moments like this, common on City of Gold, that elevate The Prototypes above many of their upfront-minded peers."
— Jemayel Khawaja of THUMP (2015)

Before releasing their debut album, as of early April 2015 The Prototypes had embarked on a City of Gold world tour, with stops in thirteen North American cities. The tour also included album launches at Electric Brixton in London and the club Coalition in Brighton in early March. They officially released their debut album City of Gold on 17 May 2015 through Viper Recordings, and afterwards continued their 50 date tour, playing at festivals such as Urban Art Forms and Tomorrowland. The week of its release, City of Gold reached No. 22 on the UK Dance Chart.

Featuring guest vocals from artists such as Ayah Marar and Amy Pearson, City of Gold met with a largely positive reception in the press. Robin Murray of UKF Music called the debut "a relentless, incendiary journey through a range of genres and tempos," while Break Beat Magazine opined that "there's a concept (without being too laboured or contrived), there's a journey and... evidence of them really pushing themselves in different, exciting directions." A track from the album was also included on a list of the Top 10 Drum And Bass Tracks put out by Magnetic Magazine.

As of 2015, the duo had released remixes for artists such as Avicii, Ed Sheeran, Bingo Players, Hadouken!, Modestep, AlunaGeorge, Fleur, Don Diablo, Ian Carey and Snoop Dogg, DJ Vadim, The Qemists, and others. They have also received recent support in clubs and on radio shows from musicians such as Andy C, Knife Party, Zane Lowe, Afrojack, Annie Mac and Krewella. They have been featured in live mixes at the BBC Radio 1 studio, including for an hour-long Quest Mix.

In 2016 the production duo set up their own record label "Get Hype Records" stating "The time feels right. Starting a record label and being in charge of our own music is something we've always wanted and now it just feels like we could go out on our own and actually make it happen, We also have an amazing team of people around us right now that all believe also. It's a special time." The first release on 1 July being "Rockets Gunz Blazin'".

== Style and equipment ==
The Prototypes produce music largely influenced by drum and bass, as well as related genres such as breakbeat and jungle. When asked about incorporating other genres, the members stated in 2015 that "both of us have always had one common goal, and that's to smash it as hard as we can and be the best at what we love doing… Which is writing drum and bass. Sure, we will experiment with other tempos and genres, but our hearts bump at 174bpm and [we] don't see that changing very soon." On 11 May 2015, Jemayel Khawaja of the publication THUMP wrote that "The Prototypes have been a fixture on the UK underground for a while now, particularly amongst the more aggressively ilked." Early musical influences on the members were diverse, with Garvey citing the Fugees as influential, and White citing Nas. Both have also been influenced by releases from Guns N' Roses and Slash. The duo uses programs such as Cubase for production VSTs such as SynthMaster.

== Members ==
- Chris Garvey (2007–2023) – production
- Nick White (2007–present) – production

== Awards and nominations ==
Year	Award	Nominated work	Category	Result
2014	Drum and Bass; Arena Awards	The Prototypes	Best DJ	Nominated
2014	Drum and Bass; Arena Awards	The Prototypes	Best Producer	Nominated
2014	Drum and Bass; Arena Awards	"Pale Blue Dot" by The Prototypes	Best Track	Nominated
2014	Drum and Bass; Arena Awards	"Don't Let Me Go" by The Prototypes	Best Music Video	Nominated

== Discography ==
=== Albums ===
Albums by The Prototypes
Year	Album title	Release details	UK Charts
Year	Album title	Release details	Dance
2015	City of Gold	Released: 17 May 2015; Label: Viper Recordings (VPRL010); Format: CD, digital download, vinyl	22
2020	Ten Thousand Feet & Rising	Released: 23 October 2020; Label: Get Hype Records; Format: CD, digital download, vinyl	—
"—" denotes a recording that did not chart or was not released in that territory.

=== Extended plays ===
EPs by The Prototypes
Year	Album title	Release details
2011	Born to Rise EP	Released: 5 September 2011; Label: Shogun Audio Ltd; Format: Digital download
2011	Suffocate / Habitation – EP	Released: 11 November 2011; Label: Shogun Audio Ltd; Format: Digital download
2013	Rage Within / Insomniac – EP	Released: 6 May 2013; Label: Shogun Audio Ltd; Format: Digital download
2014	Don't Let Me Go – EP	Released: 10 August 2014; Label: Viper Recordings; Format: Digital download

=== Singles ===
Incomplete list of songs by The Prototypes
Year	Title	Album
2010	"Breathless" / "Work It"	Non-album single
2010	"Cascade" / "Need the Love"	Non-album single
2010	"Evolution" (featuring Darrison)	Non-album single
2011	"Born to Rise"	Born to Rise EP
2011	"Suffocate / Habitation"	Non-album single
2012	"Pandora" / "Abyss"	Non-album single
2013	"Rage Within" / "Insomniac"	Non-album single
2014	"Pale Blue Dot" / "Lights"	City of Gold
2014	"Don't Let Me Go" / "Humanoid"	City of Gold
2015	"Pop It Off" (featuring Mad Hed City)	City of Gold
2015	"Hypercube"	Non-album single
2016	"Rocket Guns Blazin'"	Ten Thousand Feet & Rising
2016	"Transmission"	Non-album single
2017	"Electric"	Ten Thousand Feet & Rising
2017	"Levelz" (featuring Mad Hed City)	Non-album single
2018	"Species" (with TC)	Non-album single
2019	"Millennia"	Non-album single
2019	"Into the Night"	UKF10
2020	"Shadows" (featuring Lily McKenzie)	Ten Thousand Feet & Rising
2020	"Oxygen" (featuring Kudu Blue)	Ten Thousand Feet & Rising
2020	"Enter the Warrior" (featuring B3NDU)	Ten Thousand Feet & Rising
2020	"Paradise" (featuring Elle Exxe)	Ten Thousand Feet & Rising
2020	"Quantum"	Ten Thousand Feet & Rising
2020	"Reason" (featuring Lowes)	Ten Thousand Feet & Rising
2021	"Alive" (with Noisy)	Non-album single
2022	"Never Be Alone" (with Felix Samuel)	Non-album single
2022	"Enter The Warrior" (VIP) (with B3NDU)	Non-album single
2022	"Interaction"	Interaction
2023	"Unplug The Clock"	Non-album single
2024	"First Sun"	Non-album single
2024	"Don't Wanna Play"	Non-album single
2024	"Hyperspeed"	Non-album single
2024	"Faithless"	Non-album single
2025	"Feed My Soul"	Non-album single

=== Remixes ===
Incomplete list of official remixes by The Prototypes, with date of remix release
Year	Title	Original artist
2007	"Bad Signal"	Hadouken!
2010	"Take It Back"	The Qemists (featuring Enter Shikari)
2010	"Better Than"	Jammer
2010	"My Feelings For You"	Avicii and Sebastian Drums
2010	"Animale"	Don Diablo (featuring Dragonette)
2010	"The Terrorist"	DJ Vadim
2011	"Feel Good"	Modestep
2011	"Someone"	Friction (featuring McLean)
2011	"Lego House"	Ed Sheeran
2011	"Last Night"	Ian Carey (featuring Snoop Dogg)
2012	"Your Drums, Your Love"	AlunaGeorge
2012	"Bad Signal"	Hadouken!
2013	"Fire"	Donae'o
2013	"Experts"	SKisM
2013	"Get Up (Rattle)"	Bingo Players (featuring Far East Movement)
2013	"Turn the Lights On"	Fleur East
2013	"Make It There"	Koven (featuring Folly Rae)
2013	"Steve French"	Flux Pavilion
2014	"Messin' with my Mind"	Five Knives
2014	"Friday"	Shadow Child (featuring Takura)
2015	"Delirium"	Zomboy (featuring Rykka)
2015	"Chunky"	Format:B
2016	"Fallen" (remix with Teddy Killerz)	The Prototypes (featuring Donae'o)
2016	"Harmony"	Adam F & Kokiri (featuring Rae)
2016	"Higher"	Netsky & Jauz
2017	"Beyond the Wall"	Sigma
2017	"Goes Like"	Skepsis
2017	"Teleportation"	Dirtyphonics
2018	"Téquila Limonada"	Netsky (featuring A. Chal)
2018	"Wait For Me"	Leeroy Thornhill
2018	"Immersion"	Black Sun Empire (featuring Belle Doran)
2018	"Blood Sugar"	Pendulum
2019	"Here With Me"	Delta Heavy (featuring Modestep)
2019	"Warrior"	Barely Alive (featuring Mad Hed City)
2019	"Games"	Macky Gee
2019	"Reach"	Tantrum Desire
2021	"Your Pain"	Koven
2021	"Be Somebody"	James Vincent McMorrow & Rudimental

== See also ==
- List of jungle and drum and bass artists
