= Michael Kiwanuka discography =

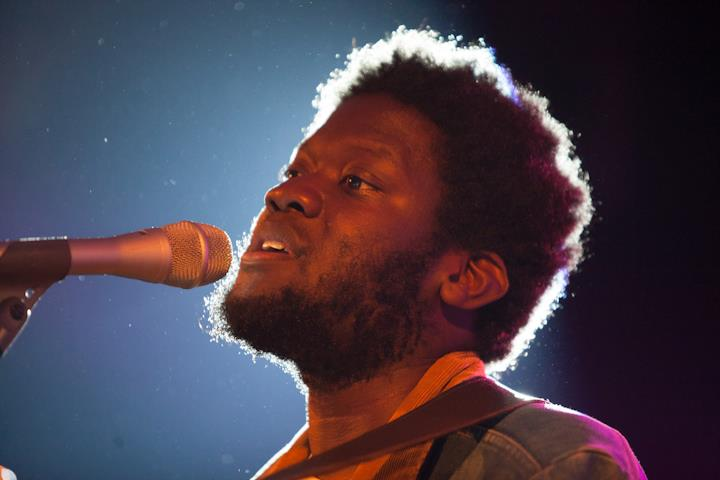
- Performing at the 2012 Montreux Jazz Festival.
- Studio albums: 5
- EPs: 5
- Singles: 20

Michael Kiwanuka, an English singer-songwriter and record producer, has released five studio albums, five EPs, and 20 singles. His debut studio album, Home Again, was released in March 2012. The album peaked at number four on the UK Albums Chart. The album includes the singles "Home Again", "I'm Getting Ready", "I'll Get Along", "Bones" and "Tell Me a Tale". His second studio album, Love & Hate, was released in July 2016. The album peaked at number one on the UK Albums Chart. The album includes the singles "Black Man in a White World", "Love & Hate", "One More Night" and "Cold Little Heart". His third studio album, Kiwanuka, was released in November 2019. The album peaked at number two on the UK Albums Chart. The album includes the singles "You Ain't the Problem" and "Hero".

== Studio albums ==
Title	Details	Peak chart positions										Sales	Certifications
Title	Details	UK	AUS	AUT	BEL (FL)	GER	IRE	NL	POR	SWI	US	Sales	Certifications
Home Again	Release: 12 March 2012; Label: Polydor; Formats: CD, digital download, vinyl	4	67	13	2	17	16	1	17	13	86	UK: 181,033	BPI: Gold; IFPI NOR: Gold; NVPI: Gold
Love & Hate	Release: 15 July 2016; Label: Polydor; Formats: CD, digital download, vinyl	1	35	11	9	6	15	8	33	4	170	UK: 180,773	BPI: Gold
Kiwanuka	Release: 1 November 2019; Label: Polydor; Formats: CD, cassette, digital download, vinyl	2	39	31	4	23	11	6	13	8	142	UK: 154,437	BPI: Gold
Small Changes	Release: 22 November 2024; Label: Polydor; Format: CD, cassette, digital download, vinyl	2	—	15	5	11	44	2	104	6	— (Note: Small Changes did not enter the US Billboard 200, but peaked at number 48 on the Top Current Album Sales Chart.)		
Fudge	Release: 23 October 2026; Label: Polydor; Format: CD, cassette, digital download, vinyl	13	—	51	3	28	—	4	—	13	—		
"—" denotes an album that has not charted or was not released in that territory.

== Extended plays ==
Title	Details
Tell Me a Tale EP (Isle of Wight Sessions)	Released: 24 April 2011; Label: Communion Records; Format: Digital download, 10" vinyl
iTunes Festival: London 2011	Released: 8 July 2011; Label: Polydor Records; Format: Digital download
I'm Getting Ready EP	Released: 24 July 2011; Label: Communion Records; Format: Digital download, 10" vinyl
Out Loud!	Released: 21 April 2018; Label: Polydor; Format: Digital download, 12" vinyl

== Singles ==
Single	Year	Peak chart positions										Certifications	Album
Single	Year	UK	BEL (FL)	BEL (WA)	FRA	NL	POL	POR	SCO	SWI Air	US AAA	Certifications	Album
"Home Again"	2012	29	3	— (Note: "Home Again" did not enter the Wallonie Ultratop 50, but peaked at number 11 on the Ultratip chart.)	21	59	—	—	34	—	29	BPI: Silver; IFPI NOR: Gold	Home Again
"I'm Getting Ready"	2012	187	—	—	—	—	—	—	—	—	8		Home Again
"I'll Get Along"	2012	— (Note: "I'll Get Along" did not enter the UK Singles Chart, but peaked at number 54 on the UK Physical Singles Chart.)	— (Note: "I'll Get Along" did not enter the Flanders Ultratop 50, but peaked at number 4 on the Ultratip chart.)	— (Note: "I'll Get Along" did not enter the Wallonie Ultratop 50, but peaked at number 18 on the Ultratip chart.)	—	—	—	—	—	—	—		Home Again
"Bones"	2012	— (Note: "Bones" did not enter the UK Singles Chart, but peaked at number 65 on the UK Physical Singles Chart.)	— (Note: "Bones" did not enter the Flanders Ultratop 50, but peaked at number 17 on the Ultratip chart.)	— (Note: "Bones" did not enter the Wallonie Ultratop 50, but peaked at number 35 on the Ultratip chart.)	—	—	—	—	—	—	—		Home Again
"Tell Me a Tale"	2013	— (Note: "Tell Me a Tale" did not enter the UK Singles Chart, but peaked at number 70 on the UK Physical Singles Chart Top 100.)	— (Note: "Tell Me a Tale" did not enter the Flanders Ultratop 50, but peaked at number 18 on the Ultratip chart.)	—	159	—	—	—	—	—	10		Home Again
"You've Got Nothing to Lose"	2014	—	— (Note: "You've Got Nothing to Lose" did not enter the Flanders Ultratop 50, but peaked at number 46 on the Ultratip chart.)	—	—	—	—	—	—	—	—		Non-album single
"Black Man in a White World"	2016	—	— (Note: "Black Man in a White World" did not enter the Flanders Ultratop 50, but peaked at number 31 on the Ultratip chart.)	— (Note: "Black Man in a White World" did not enter the Wallonie Ultratop 50, but charted as an "extra tip" on the Ultratip chart.)	104	—	—	—	—	—	—		Love & Hate
"Love & Hate"	2016	—	— (Note: "Love & Hate" did not enter the Flanders Ultratop 50, but peaked at number 24 on the Ultratip chart.)	— (Note: "Love & Hate" did not enter the Wallonie Ultratop 50, but charted as an "extra tip" on the Ultratip chart.)	—	—	—	—	—	—	8	BPI: Silver	Love & Hate
"One More Night"	2016	—	— (Note: "One More Night" did not enter the Flanders Ultratop 50, but peaked at number 46 on the Ultratip chart.)	— (Note: "One More Night" did not enter the Wallonie Ultratop 50, but charted as an "extra tip" on the Ultratip chart.)	—	—	—	—	—	73	11		Love & Hate
"Cold Little Heart"	2017	— (Note: "Cold Little Heart" did not enter the UK Singles Chart, but peaked at number 100 on the UK Singles Sales Chart.)	— (Note: "Cold Little Heart" did not enter the Flanders Ultratop 50, but peaked at number 35 on the Ultratip chart.)	— (Note: "Cold Little Heart" did not enter the Wallonie Ultratop 50, but peaked at number 45 on the Ultratip chart.)	174	— (Note: "Cold Little Heart" did not enter the Netherlands' Single Top 100 but peaked on the Netherlands' Single Tip Chart at number 26.)	33	84	27	—	4	BPI: Platinum; IFPI NOR: Gold; RIAA: Platinum	Love & Hate
"Money" (with Tom Misch)	2019	—	— (Note: "Money" did not enter the Flanders Ultratop 50, but peaked at number 12 on the Ultratip chart.)	— (Note: "Money" did not enter the Wallonie Ultratop 50, but peaked at number 35 on the Ultratip chart.)	—	—	—	—	—	—	—		Non-album single
"You Ain't the Problem"	2019	— (Note: "You Ain't the Problem" did not enter the UK Singles Chart, but peaked at number 92 on the UK Singles Sales Chart.)	— (Note: "You Ain't the Problem" did not enter the Flanders Ultratop 50, but peaked at number 18 on the Ultratip chart.)	— (Note: "You Ain't the Problem" did not enter the Wallonie Ultratop 50, but charted as an "extra tip" on the Ultratip chart.)	—	—	—	—	—	—	—		Kiwanuka
"Hero"	2019	— (Note: "Hero" did not enter the UK Singles Chart, but peaked at number 41 on the UK Singles Sales Chart.)	— (Note: "Hero" did not enter the Flanders Ultratop 50, but peaked at number 5 on the Ultratip chart.)	—	—	—	62	—	50	—	3		Kiwanuka
"Piano Joint (This Kind of Love)"	2019	—	—	—	—	—	—	—	—	—	—		Kiwanuka
"Solid Ground"	2019	— (Note: "Solid Ground" did not enter the UK Singles Chart, but peaked at number five on the UK Physical Singles Chart.)	—	—	76	—	—	—	—	—	—		Kiwanuka
"Light"	2020	— (Note: "Light" did not enter the UK Singles Chart, but peaked at number 38 on the UK Singles Sales Chart.)	— (Note: "Light" did not enter the Flanders Ultratop 50, but peaked at number 27 on the Ultratip chart.)	— (Note: "Light" did not enter the Wallonie Ultratop 50, but charted as an "extra tip" on the Ultratip chart.)	—	—	—	—	52	—	—		Kiwanuka
"Rolling"	2020	—	—	—	—	—	—	—	—	—	4		Kiwanuka
"Beautiful Life"	2021	—	—	—	—	—	—	—	—	—	—		Non-album single
"Floating Parade"	2024	— (Note: "Floating Parade" did not enter the UK Singles Chart, but peaked at number 57 on the UK Singles Sales Chart.)	—	—	—	— (Note: "Floating Parade" did not enter the Netherlands' Single Top 100 but peaked on the Netherlands' Airplay Chart at number 34.)	—	—	—	—	1		Small Changes
"Lowdown" (parts i and ii)	2024	—	—	—	—	—	—	—	—	—	—		Small Changes
"The Rest of Me"	2024	— (Note: "The Rest of Me" did not enter the UK Singles Chart, but peaked at number 40 on the UK Singles Sales Chart.)	—	—	—	—	—	—	—	—	12		Small Changes
"Summer Clothes"	2026	—	—	—	—	—	—	—	—	—	—		Fudge
"Sing"	2026	—	—	—	—	—	—	—	—	—	—		Fudge
"—" denotes a single that did not chart or was not released in that territory.

== Other charted songs ==
Single	Year	Peak chart positions			Album
Single	Year	UK Indie	BEL (FL)	MEX Eng.	Album
"I Need You by My Side"	2011	50	—	—	I'm Getting Ready EP
"Yo! My Saint" (Karen O featuring Michael Kiwanuka)	2018	—	—	41	Non-album single
"Final Days"	2019	—	— (Note: "Final Days" did not enter the Flanders Ultratop 50, but charted as an "extra tip" on the Ultratip chart.)	48	Kiwanuka
"—" denotes a song that did not chart or was not released in that territory.

== Guest appearances ==
List of non-single guest appearances, with other performing artists, showing year released and album name
Title	Year	Other artist(s)	Album
"It Always Comes Back Around"	2014	—N/a	House of Lies (Soundtrack)
"No More Running"	2014	—N/a	A Long Way Down
"Rule the World (I Came from the City)"	2016	Nasir Jones as Mr. Books	The Get Down
"Sometimes I Feel Like a Motherless Child"	2017	—N/a	Resistance Radio: The Man in the High Castle
"On My Knees"	2019	Unkle	Music Inspired by the Film Roma
"Bow"	2020	Sault	Untitled (Black Is)
"To Be Young, Gifted and Black"	2021	—N/a	Small Axe (Music Inspired by the Original TV Series)
"13th Century Metal - Michael Kiwanuka Mix"	2021	Brittany Howard, St Francis Hotel	Jaime (Reimagined)
"Aquamarine"	2022	Black Thought, Danger Mouse	Cheat Codes
