= Nick Howard discography =

- Studio albums: 2
- Extended plays: 2
- Compilation albums: 1
- Singles: 2

British singer-songwriter from Brighton, Nick Howard has released two studio albums, two extended play, one compilation and two singles. In 2012 he won the second season of The Voice of Germany.

His debut album, Something To Talk About was released on 7 May 2008 under Honey Factor Records. The album included songs which were featured in television shows and films, and received airplay across radio networks in the US and in Europe.

His second album, When The Lights Go Up was released on 31 October 2011 under Honey Factor Records. The album included several tracks produced by Marshall Altman, and was recorded in Los Angeles and Nashville. The first singles from the album have broken into radio charts and MTV played the video for "Falling For You". To support the release of this album, Howard supported Lifehouse, Boyce Avenue, Tyler Ward and Sunrise Avenue, and has undertaken tours of his own in 2012. He was the recipient of an ASCAP songwriting award for "Days Like These", a single from the new album.

Before Howard won The Voice of Germany he released his winners single "Unbreakable" on 7 December 2012 as the lead single from his third studio album, the single peaked at number 5 on the German Singles Chart. On 21 December 2012 he released My Voice Story a compilation album of all the songs he performed on the show, peaking at number 34 on the German Albums Chart.

In 2020, he released "Brave," a song with an uplifting message in response to the world-wide pandemic. He said, "This bizarre 2020 landscape inspired me to write a song that called on all of us to stand up for peace, tolerance, kindness and for those less fortunate than ourselves."

== Albums ==
=== Studio albums ===
Title	Album details
Something to Talk About	Released: 7 May 2008; Labels: Honey Factor Records; Formats: CD, digital download
When the Lights Go Up	Released: 31 October 2011; Labels: Honey Factor Records; Formats: CD, digital download
Stay Who You Are	Released: 25 January 2013; Labels: Universal Music; Formats: CD, digital download
Living in Stereo	Released: 25 January 2013; Labels: Universal Music; Formats: CD, digital download
Live in Stereo	Released: 30 January 2015; Labels: Satellite Music LLC
All or Nothing	Released: 14 October 2016; Labels: Satellite Music
Hope, Happiness & Heartbreak	Released: 23 February 2024; Labels: Satellite Music

=== Compilation albums ===
Title	Album details	Peak chart positions	
Title	Album details	GER	AUT
My Voice Story	Released: 21 December 2012; Labels: Universal Music Group; Formats: CD, digital download	34	57

=== Extended plays ===
Title	EP details
Contradicted	Released: 2006; Formats: CD, digital download
Bridging the Gap	Released: 2009; Formats: CD, digital download

== Singles ==
=== As lead artist ===
Year	Title	Peak chart positions			Album
Year	Title	GER	AUT	SWI	Album
2010	"Falling For You"	—	—	—	When the Lights Go Up
2012	"Unbreakable"	5	19	26	My Voice Story

=== Other charted songs ===
Year	Title	Peak chart positions	Album
Year	Title	GER	Album
2012	"Skinny Love" (Nick Howard & Michael Heinemann)	91	My Voice Story
