= BBC Radio 1's Live Lounge 2012 =

Compilation album by Various artists
- Released: 29 October 2012
- Genre: Various
- Label: Sony
- Producer: Various

Live Lounge chronology
Radio 1's Live Lounge – Volume 6 (2011)	BBC Radio 1's Live Lounge 2012 (2012)	BBC Radio 1's Live Lounge 2013 (2013)

BBC Radio 1's Live Lounge 2012 is a compilation album consisting of live tracks played on Fearne Cotton's BBC Radio 1 show, both cover versions and original songs. The album was released on 29 October 2012, and is the eighth in the series of Live Lounge albums.

== Track listing ==
Disc 1
No.	Title	Artist	Length
1.	"Somebody That I Used to Know" (originally by Gotye featuring Kimbra)	Rita Ora	3:30
2.	"Next To Me"	Emeli Sandé	3:29
3.	"We Are Young"	fun.	4:10
4.	"Call Me Maybe" (originally by Carly Rae Jepsen)	Ben Howard	4:22
5.	"Domino"	Jessie J	4:17
6.	"Titanium" (originally by David Guetta featuring Sia)	Tulisa	3:49
7.	"Feel the Love" (originally by Rudimental featuring John Newman)	Paloma Faith	3:50
8.	"Too Close"	Alex Clare	3:04
9.	"Starships" (originally by Nicki Minaj)	Conor Maynard	3:57
10.	"Call My Name" (originally by Cheryl Cole)	Plan B	3:16
11.	"Blue Jeans"	Lana Del Rey	4:07
12.	"Wings" (originally by Little Mix)	Scouting for Girls	3:29
13.	"Earthquake / Do It Like a Dude" (originally by Labrinth featuring Tinie Tempah / Jessie J)	JLS	3:12
14.	"R.I.P." (originally by Rita Ora)	Delilah	3:36
15.	"Only Love / Where Have You Been" (originally by Ben Howard / Rihanna)	Stooshe	4:06
16.	"Without You" (originally by David Guetta featuring Usher)	Olly Murs	3:24
17.	"Dedication to My Ex (Miss That)" (originally by Lloyd featuring André 3000 and Lil Wayne)	Pixie Lott	3:22
18.	"Pumped Up Kicks" (originally by Foster the People)	Usher	4:03

Disc 2
No.	Title	Artist	Length
1.	"One More Night"	Maroon 5	3:39
2.	"Video Games" (originally by Lana Del Rey)	Kasabian	3:56
3.	"No Church in the Wild" (originally by Jay-Z and Kanye West)	Ed Sheeran and Devlin and Labrinth	3:44
4.	"We Are Never Ever Getting Back Together" (originally by Taylor Swift)	The Vaccines	3:16
5.	"Take Care" (originally by Drake featuring Rihanna)	Florence + the Machine	4:33
6.	"Beautiful Girls / Stand by Me" (originally by Sean Kingston / Ben E. King)	Maverick Sabre	3:29
7.	"Beautiful People" (originally by Chris Brown featuring Benny Benassi)	Labrinth	3:54
8.	"We Found Love" (originally by Rihanna featuring Calvin Harris)	Example	3:17
9.	"Machu Picchu" (originally by The Strokes)	Foster the People	4:23
10.	"We Will Rock You" (originally by Queen)	Dappy and Brian May	3:00
11.	"Lights Out, Words Gone"	Bombay Bicycle Club	4:36
12.	"Lonely Boy" (originally by The Black Keys)	The Maccabees	3:04
13.	"I Won't Let You Go"	James Morrison	3:46
14.	"Lego House" (originally by Ed Sheeran)	Loick Essien	4:04
15.	"Who You Are" (originally by Jessie J)	Twin Atlantic	3:32
16.	"I'm Getting Ready"	Michael Kiwanuka	2:22
17.	"To the Stars"	Modestep	4:31
18.	"On A Mission" (originally by Katy B)	Arctic Monkeys	2:54
19.	"Hometown Glory" (originally by Adele)	Professor Green	3:01

== Charts ==
Chart (2012)	Peak position
UK Compilation Albums Chart	1
