= Nick Howard =

English singer-songwriter (born 1982)

Nicholas 'Nick' Howard (born 24 April 1982, Brighton) is an English singer-songwriter who has released six albums since 2008 and played over 1000 shows across the world. His music has been featured on Pretty Little Liars, Switched at Birth, The Hills, Jersey Shore, Next, True Life, Cougar Town, 90210, LA Ink, Greek and Army Wives. He has toured with Lifehouse, Boyce Avenue, Eric Hutchinson, Tristan Prettyman and supported Train, Gavin Degraw and Jack Johnson.

He has performed several times on live television in the US and Europe, including appearances on NBC, Fox and the BBC along with a live performance in front of 1 million people in Berlin on New Year's Eve 2013/4. Howard has cited a range of musical influences and life experiences when writing and performing. His musical influences include The Beatles, John Mayer, Jason Mraz, The Script, Oasis and Coldplay. He is also known for being the 2012 winner of the German television show The Voice of Germany.

== Life and career ==
Howard moved to New York City in 2004, and had day and night jobs for several years before being able to make the transition to a full-time musician. During this time he squeezed in shows, writing and recording where and whenever possible.

=== 2008: Something To Talk About ===
His debut album, Something To Talk About (2009), included songs which were featured in television shows and films, and received airplay across radio networks in the US and in Europe. Since then, Howard has toured all over the world (playing over 300 shows per year), and has seen his songs break into the record charts.

=== 2011–12: When The Lights Go Up ===
His second album, When The Lights Go Up (2011), included several tracks produced by Marshall Altman, and was recorded in Los Angeles and Nashville. To support the release of this album, Howard supported Lifehouse, Boyce Avenue, Tyler Ward and Sunrise Avenue, and has embarked on tours of his own in 2012. He was the recipient of an ASCAP songwriting award for "Days Like These", a single from the new album. All four singles from the album broke into the Top 50 mainstream radio airplay charts in Germany, where Nick licensed "When The Lights Go Up" through Hamburg based independent label, Ferryhouse. MTV supported the promotional effort in the United States by playing the video for "Falling For You".

=== 2012: The Voice of Germany ===
Howard has enjoyed particular success in Germany and its neighboring countries including Austria, Switzerland and the Netherlands. As a result, he has spent time in both New York and Europe, frequently traveling between the two. On 13 October 2012, Howard confirmed via Facebook and Twitter that he would be a contestant in Season 2 of The Voice of Germany. His blind audition aired on 18 October, with Howard deciding to join Rea Garvey's team.

Tickets for his European Tour began selling out, however he was forced to cancel all but two of the shows due to filming commitments for the next round of The Voice of Germany. On 14 December 2012, he won the competition and was voted the "Voice of Germany 2012" with over 41% of the public vote. Nick also signed a publishing deal with BMG Rights Management shortly before committing to "The Voice of Germany". Nick also learned to speak German only a few months before his blind audition.

Howard released his winners single "Unbreakable" on 7 December 2012 as the lead single from his third studio album, the single peaked at number 5 on the German Singles Chart. On 21 December 2012 Universal released My Voice Story a compilation album of all the songs Nick performed on the show, peaking at number 34 on the German Albums Chart. His third studio album 'Stay Who You Are' was released in Germany on 25 January, peaking at number 1 on the iTunes Pop chart and number 12 on the German Albums Chart. It was released in the US on 19 February.

==== Performances on The Voice of Germany ====
Performed	Song	Original Artist	Result
Blind Auditions	"I Won't Give Up"	Jason Mraz	Joined Team Rea
Battle Rounds	"Home Again" (against Yvi Szoncsó)	Michael Kiwanuka	Winner
Week 1	"We Are Young" (against Rayland Horton)	Fun.	Safe
Week 2	"Yellow" (against Bianca Böhme)	Coldplay	Safe
Week 3	"Unbreakable" (against Michael Heinemann)	Nick Howard	Safe
Final	"Unbreakable"	Nick Howard	Winner (41.04%)
Final	"One Day Like This"	Elbow	Winner (41.04%)
Final	"Read All About It (Part III)" (with Emeli Sandé)	Emeli Sandé	Winner (41.04%)

=== 2013 ===
Immediately following the show, Nick embarked on a 9 date arena tour with the 'Top 8' contestants, playing to mostly sold out crowds throughout Germany and even playing the O2 World (Berlin) which he had joked to his mother about playing as they took the S-Bahn back from his blind audition. In April he headlined 12 dates through Germany, headlining venues such as Docks where only a few years prior, he had been a support act for Lifehouse.

Following his full-band headlining tour he embarked on his "Up Close & Acoustic" Tour, playing sold out shows in Austria, Switzerland, the Netherlands, New York City, and Los Angeles. In the Summer of 2013, he embarked on his 'Secret Garden Party' tour in Germany, which included 5 sold out shows at special and unique venues across Germany. Howard planned, booked and executed the entire tour himself, even building the stage each day with his band.

In September 2013, he confirmed via Facebook and Twitter that he was moving to Los Angeles to write and record his fourth album. In Los Angeles, Howard wrote with Toby Gad and, together with Lindy Robbins, wrote the first single from his new album, "Untouchable", planned for a worldwide release on 29 November 2013. During the promotional tour for "Untouchable" Nick will play in front of an estimated 1 million people at the Brandenburg Gate in Berlin on New Year's Eve, perform "Untouchable" on "The Voice of Germany" on 6 December and at "The Voice of the World" concert in Beijing on 30 November.

In 2013, Howard was also featured on the Cascada album, "Acoustic Sessions". The album was released on 1 November 2013.

=== 2014 ===
In the Spring of 2014 Nick toured with Boyce Avenue on a 30 date European Tour and played to over 30,000 fans across Europe. He followed this by supporting Tyrone Wells on a 12 date US Tour before returning to Europe for the Summer festival season.

Nick's European headlining tour in the Fall of 2014 saw him play 12 shows across Germany, Austria, Switzerland, Italy, The Netherlands, Belgium & France. The tour included sold out shows in Hamburg, Frankfurt, Cologne and Amsterdam.

Immediately following his headlining tour in Europe, Nick returned to the US for a 31 date tour supporting Eric Hutchinson and Tristan Prettyman on their 'City & Sand Tour'.

=== 2015 ===
Howard followed up the success of his support tours in 2014 by booking his own headlining tour in the USA in 2015 which included sold out shows in New York, Washington DC, Seattle and San Francisco.

=== 2016 ===
In 2016 Howard released his 5th studio album, All Or Nothing through Ferryhouse Productions in Europe and Satellite Music in the US. The song 'Fight' from the album was used as the Official Tour de France song for 2017.

=== 2017 - present ===
In late 2017 Howard successfully crowd funded the first of his ongoing 'Song of the Month' releases. To date these have been:

November 2017 | Hurricane

December 2017 | Shelter

January 2018 | Where Do We Go

February 2018 | Frantic

March 2018 | Our Time

October 2018 | Follow

November 2018 | I Still Believe

May 2019 | Everywhere

August 2019 | Crazy

November 2019 | Won't Give Up

February 2020 | Fire

April 2020 | What I Love

October 2020 | Brave

Each month, Howard donates any profits from the crowdfunding efforts to a different charity.

== Discography ==
=== Studio albums ===
- Something to Talk About (2008)
- When the Lights Go Up (2011)
- Stay Who You Are (2013)
- Living in Stereo (2014)
- Live in Stereo (2015)
- All or Nothing (2016)

=== Extended plays ===
- Contradicted (2006)
- Bridging the Gap (2009)

=== Singles ===
- "A Better Man" (2009)
- "Falling For You" (2010)
- "Days Like These" (2011)
- "Unbreakable" (2012)
- "If I Told You" (2013)
- "Untouchable" (2013/2014)
- "Fight" (2016)
- "Where Do We Go" (2017)

Awards and achievements
Preceded by Ivy Quainoo	The Voice of Germany Winner; 2012	Succeeded by Andreas Kümmert
