= Socks and Sandals =

Socks and sandals is a footwear combination.

Socks and Sandals may also refer to:

== Music ==
- "Socks and Sandals", a song by Format B
- "Socks and Sandals", a song by Andrew Winton, featured on the album Glorybox Mechanics
