= My Feelings for You =

Single by Avicii and Sebastien Drums
- Released: 13 December 2010 (UK); 1 February 2011 (US)
- Genre: Progressive house; electro house
- Length: 6:15 (original mix); 3:07 (edited version); 2:33 (UK radio edit)
- Label: Ultra Records
- Songwriters: Tim Bergling; Sebastien Drums; Cassius (Parts which are included in remix)
- Producers: Avicii; Sebastian Drums; Cassius (Parts which are included in remix)

Avicii singles chronology
"Bromance" (2010)	"My Feelings for You" (2010)	"Seek Bromance" (2010)

Audio
- "My Feelings For You (Original Mix)" on YouTube

"My Feelings for You" is a 2010 track by DJs Avicii and Sebastien Drums, which is a remix of an original made by Cassius, a French house band, which released on Astralwerks in 1999. The single was released in the United Kingdom on 13 December 2010 as a digital EP with additional remixes, as well as an additional remix EP. The vocals are sampled from "All This Love That I'm Giving" by Gwen McCrae. The vocal samples taken are reminiscent of those used by Cassius in "Feeling For You".

After the single's official release in the United Kingdom, it started to receive a strong number of downloads and on 19 December 2010, charted at no. 46 on the UK Singles Chart and no. 4 on the UK Dance Chart, which were also the song's peak positions on those charts.

== Music video ==
The music video was released on 15 October 2010 in the United Kingdom. It received a fair amount of video play and as such charted on the UK Dance chart on 17 October 2010 at 4.

The video was created by Australian artist, Brenton March, owner of CtrldChaos.com Animation. It is computer generated, and follows the story of two love hearts that love each other. When one gets taken away, the other goes after it. The video features nods to various classic video games, including Pong, Frogger, Space Invaders, Donkey Kong, Breakout/Arkanoid, Pac-Man, Tetris, Super Mario Bros. and Gyruss. The video has received over 20 million views. Further, it makes references to a citation from a dialogue in the video game Zero Wing ("All your feelings are belong to us..." while the original phrase was "All your base are belong to us").

== Track listings ==
- Digital download
1. "My Feelings for You" - 3:05
2. "My Feelings for You" (Extended Mix) - 6:14
- UK digital EP
1. "My Feelings for You" (UK Radio Edit) - 2:30
2. "My Feelings for You" (Original Mix) - 6:14
3. "My Feelings for You" (The Noise Remix) - 6:21
4. "My Feelings for You" (LMC Remix) - 5:52
5. "My Feelings for You" (Whelan and Di Scala Remix) - 6:48
- Digital EP (The Remixes)
1. "My Feelings for You" (The Prototypes Remix) - 5:02
2. "My Feelings for You" (Treasure Fingers Remix) - 5:39
3. "My Feelings for You" (Angger Dimas Breaks Re-Rub) - 3:33
4. "My Feelings for You" (Tom Geiss vs Mikael Weermets and John Wedel Remix) - 5:46
5. "My Feelings for You" (Nova Remix) - 5:56
- CD Single
1. "My Feelings for You" (Radio Edit) - 3:07
2. "My Feelings for You" (Original Mix) - 6:15
- Vicious 30th Anniversary
1. "My Feelings for You" (Don Diablo Remix) - 3:25

== Charts ==
=== Weekly charts ===
Chart (2010)	Peak position
Austria (Ö3 Austria Top 40)	34
Belgium Dance (Ultratop Flanders)	3
Belgium Dance (Ultratop Wallonia)	3
Germany (GfK)	25
Netherlands (Dutch Top 40)	24
Netherlands (Single Top 100)	51
Poland Dance (ZPAV)	24
Poland (Video Chart)	1
Sweden (Sverigetopplistan)	37
Switzerland (Schweizer Hitparade)	40
UK Dance (OCC)	4
UK Indie (OCC)	7
UK Singles (OCC)	46

=== Year-end ===
Chart (2010)	Position
Belgium Dance (Ultratop Flanders)	97
Belgium Dance (Ultratop Wallonia)	97

== Certifications ==
Region	Certification	Certified units/sales
Germany (BVMI)	Gold	150,000^{‡}
^{‡} Sales+streaming figures based on certification alone.

== Release history ==
Region	Release	Format
Germany	15 June 2010	CD single; digital download
Sweden; Netherlands; Switzerland	September 2010	Digital download; Digital EP (Remixes)
United Kingdom	13 December 2010	Digital EP; Digital EP (Remixes)
