= Evolution Theory (Modestep album) =

Studio album by Modestep
- Released: 11 February 2013
- Recorded: 2011–12
- Genre: Dubstep; electronic rock; hard rock; drum and bass; grime
- Length: 61:17
- Label: A&M; Interscope
- Producer: Modestep

Modestep chronology
Evolution Theory (2013)	London Road (2015)

Singles from Evolution Theory
- 1. "Feel Good" Released: 6 February 2011; 2. "Sunlight" Released: 12 August 2011; 3. "To the Stars" Released: 4 November 2011; 4. "Show Me a Sign" Released: 6 May 2012

Evolution Theory is the debut studio album by British dubstep and rock band Modestep. The album was released on 11 February 2013 through A&M Records. The album charted at number 23 on the UK Albums Chart and number one on the UK Dance Albums Chart. The group performed on a headline UK tour of the same name from 2–17 February 2013, supported by album collaborators Document One and Koven. The track "Freedom" was due to be titled "We Will Not Fall" and feature vocals from Foreign Beggars, but the group withdrew from the track and the dub was renamed.

== Singles ==
- "Feel Good" is the album's lead single. It was released on 6 February 2011 and received popularity through the official video, hosted on UKF with a current view count of over 22 million. The single entered the UK Singles Chart at number 38. However, the release was recalled after the group got a record deal with Polydor Records.
- "Sunlight" is the second single from the album. It was released on 12 August 2011 and entered the UK Singles Chart at number 16.
- "To the Stars" is the third single from the album. It was released on 4 November 2011 and peaked at number 45 on the UK Singles Chart.
- "Show Me a Sign" is the fourth single from the album. It was released on 6 May 2012 and entered the UK Singles Chart at number 56.
- "Another Day" featuring Popeska is a promotional single from the album. The xKore remix was released in the form of a music video, and an accompanying edit of the video was made for the original mix. The xKore, MJ Cole and Smooth remixes also feature on the deluxe edition of the album. Due to sales of the xKore remix, the song entered the UK Singles Chart at number 172.

== Track listing ==
No.	Title	Length
1.	"Show Me a Sign"	4:27
2.	"Another Day" (featuring Popeska)	4:16
3.	"Evolution Theory" (featuring D-Power, Jammin', Jammer & Frisco)	4:13
4.	"Sunlight"	3:46
5.	"Praying for Silence" (featuring Document One)	4:11
6.	"Freedom"	3:02
7.	"Time"	4:40
8.	"Burn" (featuring Newham Generals)	4:26
9.	"To the Stars"	3:56
10.	"Leave My Mind"	4:32
11.	"Take it All" (featuring Koven)	4:12
12.	"Feel Good"	4:10
13.	"Bite the Hand"	3:53
14.	"Up"	3:45
15.	"Saved the World"	3:39

Deluxe edition bonus tracks
No.	Title	Length
1.	"Flying High"	3:57
2.	"Slow Hand"	4:05
3.	"Another Day" (xKore Remix)	4:19
4.	"Another Day" (Smooth Remix)	5:06
5.	"Another Day" (MJ Cole Remix)	5:42
6.	"Sunlight" (Zomboy Remix)	4:00
7.	"Feel Good" (Document One Remix)	4:55
8.	"Show Me a Sign" (Popeska Remix)	4:08
9.	"Evolution Theory" (Teddy Killerz Remix)	3:58

== Chart performance ==
=== Weekly charts ===
Chart (2013)	Peak position
Belgian Albums (Ultratop Flanders)	71
Belgian Albums (Ultratop Wallonia)	135
Scottish Albums (OCC)	46
UK Albums (OCC)	23
UK Album Downloads (OCC)	9
UK Dance Albums (OCC)	1

== Release history ==
Region	Date	Format	Label
Worldwide	11 February 2013	Digital download, CD, vinyl	A&M Records
