= Unbreakable (Nick Howard song) =

Single by Nick Howard

from the album My Voice Story
- Released: 7 December 2012
- Recorded: 2012
- Genre: Pop
- Length: 3:36
- Label: Universal Music Group
- Songwriter(s): Nicky Holland, Nick Howard
- Producer(s): Andy Chatterley

Nick Howard singles chronology
"Falling For You" (2010)	"Unbreakable" (2012)

"Unbreakable" is a song by British singer-songwriter from Brighton, Nick Howard who won the second series of The Voice of Germany. The song was released in Germany on 7 December 2012. The song features on his compilation album My Voice Story (2012), the song was also released as the lead single from his upcoming third studio album. The song was written by Nick Howard and produced by Andy Chatterley. It peaked at number 5 in Germany, and has charted in Austria and Switzerland.

== Music video ==
A music video to accompany the release of "Unbreakable" was first released onto YouTube on 19 December 2012 at a total length of three minutes and thirty-six seconds.

== Track listing ==
Digital download
No.	Title	Length
1.	"Unbreakable"	3:36

== Credits and personnel ==
- Lead vocals – Nick Howard
- Producers – Andy Chatterley
- Lyrics – Nick Howard
- Label: Universal Music

== Chart performance ==
Chart (2012/13)	Peak position
Austria (Ö3 Austria Top 40)	19
Switzerland (Schweizer Hitparade)	26

== Release history ==
Region	Date	Format	Label
Germany	7 December 2012	Digital download	Universal Music
