= My Voice Story =

Compilation album by Nick Howard
- Released: 21 December 2012
- Recorded: 2012
- Genres: Pop, Rock
- Label: Universal Music Group

Nick Howard chronology
When the Lights Go Up (2011)	My Voice Story (2012)	Stay Who You Are (2013)

Singles from My Voice Story
- 1. "Unbreakable" Released: 7 December 2012

My Voice Story is a compilation album by British singer-songwriter from Brighton, Nick Howard. It was released in Germany on 21 December 2012. The album has charted in Germany and Austria. The album is a compilation of all the songs Nick performed the songs on The Voice of Germany.

== Singles ==
- "Unbreakable" was released as the lead single from the album on 7 December 2012. The song has charted in Germany, Austria and Switzerland.

== Track listing ==
No.	Title	Artist(s)	Length
1.	"Unbreakable"	Nick Howard	3:36
2.	"Read All About It, Pt. III" (Live From The Voice of Germany Final)	Nick Howard & Emeli Sandé	3:47
3.	"One Day Like This" (Live From The Voice of Germany Final)	Nick Howard & Rea Garvey	3:20
4.	"I Won't Give Up"	Nick Howard	3:57
5.	"Home Again"	Nick Howard & Yvi Szoncsò	3:29
6.	"We Are Young"	Nick Howard	4:09
7.	"Yellow"	Nick Howard	4:29
8.	"Skinny Love"	Nick Howard & Michael Heinemann	3:49

== Chart performance ==
Chart (2013)	Peak position
Austrian Albums (Ö3 Austria)	57
German Albums (Media Control)	34

== Release history ==
Region	Date	Format	Label
Germany	21 December 2012	Digital download	Universal Music
