= Chunky (Format B song) =

Single by Format B
- Released: 13 November 2015
- Genre: Tech house
- Length: 6:04 (original mix); 2:38 (radio edit)
- Label: Ministry of Sound
- Songwriters: Franciskus Sell: Jakob Hildenbrand; Frederick Long; Eddie Holland

"Chunky" is the debut single from German duo Format B. It was released on 13 November 2015 as a digital download in the United Kingdom through Ministry of Sound Records. The song debuted at number 29 on the UK Singles Chart and at number 5 on the UK Dance Chart. It samples the Shorty Long song "Function at the Junction".

== Track listing ==
Digital download
No.	Title	Length
1.	"Chunky (Original Mix)"	6:04
2.	"Chunky (Radio Edit)"	2:38

== Weekly charts ==
Chart (2015)	Peak position
Scottish Singles Sales (Official Charts)	13
UK Singles (Official Charts)	29
UK Dance (Official Charts)	5
UK Indie (Official Charts)	4

== Certifications ==
Region	Certification	Certified units/sales
United Kingdom (BPI)	Silver	200,000^{‡}
^{‡} Sales+streaming figures based on certification alone.
