= I'll Get Along (song) =

Single by Michael Kiwanuka

from the album Home Again
- Released: 23 April 2012; 28 May 2012 (UK)
- Recorded: 2011
- Genre: Soul
- Length: 3:26
- Label: London Records; Polydor Records
- Songwriter(s): Paul Butler; Michael Kiwanuka
- Producer(s): Paul Butler

Michael Kiwanuka singles chronology
"I'm Getting Ready" (2012)	"I'll Get Along" (2012)	"Bones" (2012)

"I'll Get Along" is a song by British soul musician Michael Kiwanuka, from his debut studio album Home Again. It was released as a single in the United Kingdom via digital download on 28 May 2012. The song was written by Paul Butler and Michael Kiwanuka.

== Music video ==
A music video to accompany the release of "I'll Get Along" was first released onto YouTube on 30 April 2012 at a total length of three minutes and forty-nine seconds. The video sees Michael travelling across the UK and stopping at a diner, motorway bridge and ice cream van.

== Track listing ==
7" vinyl
No.	Title	Length
1.	"I'll Get Along"	3:26
2.	"I Don't Know"

Other versions

- "I'll Get Along" (Ethan Johns Session) – 3:47
- "I'll Get Along" (Live at the iTunes Festival: London 2011) – 3:36

== Chart performance ==
Chart performance for "I'll Get Along"
Chart (2012)	Peak position
Belgium (Ultratip Bubbling Under Flanders)	5
Belgium (Ultratip Bubbling Under Wallonia)	41

== Release history ==
Release history for "I'll Get Along"
Region	Date	Format	Label
United Kingdom	28 May 2012	Digital Download, 7" vinyl	Polydor Records
