= Home Again (Michael Kiwanuka album) =

Studio album by Michael Kiwanuka
- Released: 12 March 2012
- Recorded: 2011–2012
- Studios: The Steam Rooms (Ventnor, Isle of Wight)
- Genres: Soul; folk
- Length: 38:41
- Labels: London, Polydor (UK); Interscope (US)
- Producer: Paul Butler

Michael Kiwanuka chronology
I'm Getting Ready (2011)	Home Again (2012)	Love & Hate (2016)

Michael Kiwanuka studio album chronology
Home Again (2012)	Love & Hate (2016)

Singles from Home Again
- 1. "Home Again" Released: 1 January 2012; 2. "I'm Getting Ready" Released: 11 March 2012; 3. "I'll Get Along" Released: 28 March 2012; 4. "Bones" Released: 24 September 2012; 5. "Tell Me a Tale" Released: 2013

Home Again is the debut studio album by London-based singer-songwriter Michael Kiwanuka, which was released on 12 March 2012. It was produced by Paul Butler of the UK indie rock band The Bees in The Steam Rooms, a basement studio in his house in Ventnor on the Isle of Wight.

The album garnered a positive reception from critics. Home Again peaked at number 4 in the UK and spawned four singles: "Home Again", "I'm Getting Ready", "I'll Get Along" and "Bones". As of May 2012, the album has sold over 70,000 copies in the UK.

== Singles ==
- "Home Again" was released as Kiwanuka's debut single on 1 January 2012. The song peaked to number 29 on the UK Singles Chart.
- "I'm Getting Ready" was released as the album's second single on 11 March 2012. The song peaked at number 187 on the UK Singles Chart.
- "I'll Get Along" was the third single from Home Again and was released on 28 May 2012.
- "Bones" was released as the album's fourth single on 24 September 2012.

Other releases

- "Tell Me a Tale" and "I'm Getting Ready" were both the title tracks of their parent EPs. Music videos were produced for both songs, in promotion of those EPs.

== Critical reception ==
Professional ratings
Aggregate scores
Source	Rating
Metacritic	72/100
Review scores
Source	Rating
AllMusic	3/5 stars
Clash	8/10
Drowned in Sound	7/10
The Guardian	4/5 stars
The Independent	3/5 stars
NME	7/10
Paste	7.5/10
Rolling Stone	3/5 stars
The Telegraph	4/5 stars

Home Again received positive reviews from music critics. At Metacritic, which assigns a normalized rating out of 100 to reviews from mainstream critics, the album received an average score of 72, based on 25 reviews.

Alexis Petredis of The Guardian gave high praise to Butler's production for capturing early '70s soul music and Kiwanuka's vocals and lyrics for feeling authentic, saying that, "Home Again's strength lies in the fact that it manages to tick a lot of boxes without sounding like it set out to tick a lot of boxes." Gareth James of Clash also praised Butler for his soft, acoustic production and compared Kiwanuka's vocals positively to Bill Withers, calling the album "an absolute treat for fans of rootsy vintage soul and a remarkable statement of intent for a debut release." Helen Brown of The Telegraph praised the production aesthetics for sounding complex and easy-going, saying that, "Despite its lyrical portrait of a constant worrier who feels lost and lonely, Home Again is a remarkably assured and sophisticated album." Hilary Saunders of Paste admired Kiwanuka's vocals and lyrics for resembling '70s soul artists like Otis Redding and Marvin Gaye, concluding with, "On Home Again, the young Kiwanuka proves that youth and wisdom are not mutually exclusive and his insights and talents, albeit still a bit raw, suggest great things to come."

Thom Jurek of AllMusic noted that Butler's vintage sounding production felt paint-by-numbers at times and Kiwanuka's lyrical content needed fine-tuning, concluding with, "Despite difficulties, Home Again is a promising debut by an artist who will no doubt deliver big if developed properly." Andy Gill of The Independent also found Kiwanuka's vocals and lyrics needing a bit more urgency and edge to them but called the album "a pleasant enough handful of easy-going songs, in which the focus on warmth has left them lacking bite." Emily Mackay of NME questioned the album's lack of gritty lyrics and false authenticity but said there were tracks that felt like genuine work, concluding that "Home Again provides a sumptuously soft place for tired ears to rest. Enough for many, for now, and a good start." Aaron Lavery of Drowned in Sound felt the album was depressing at times but said that "[I]t’s a minor quibble however, of a record that has clearly been crafted with great care and a terrific talent behind both the songwriting and the production."

== Track listing ==
Standard listing
No.	Title	Length
1.	"Tell Me a Tale"	4:12
2.	"I'm Getting Ready"	2:25
3.	"I'll Get Along"	3:31
4.	"Rest"	3:52
5.	"Home Again"	3:30
6.	"Bones"	3:52
7.	"Always Waiting"	4:31
8.	"I Won't Lie"	4:06
9.	"Any Day Will Do Fine"	3:40
10.	"Worry Walks Beside Me"	5:02
Total length:		38:41

Deluxe Version
No.	Title	Length
11.	"They Say I'm Doing Just Fine"	3:40
12.	"Now I'm Seeing"	2:34
13.	"Ode to You"	3:23
14.	"I'll Get Along" (Ethan Johns Sessions)	3:40
15.	"I Won't Lie" (Ethan Johns Sessions)	4:01
Total length:		17:27

== Personnel ==
Adapted from the Home Again booklet.

Performers and musicians

- Michael Kiwanuka – vocals (all tracks); acoustic guitar (tracks 1–3, 5–7, 9); backing vocals (tracks 3, 6, 7, 10); bass (tracks 1, 3–5, 8–10); claps and stomps (track 5); electric guitar (tracks 1, 3, 4, 6–8, 10); Rhodes piano (track 1)
- Paul Armfield – double bass (track 2)
- Paul Butler – backing vocals (tracks 2, 3, 6–10); cello (tracks 3–5); double bass (track 7); drums (tracks 2–10); Kora (tracks 1, 8); Moog (track 4); percussion (all tracks); piano (tracks 3, 4, 6–8, 10); Rhodes piano (tracks 4, 5, 8); saxophone (tracks 1, 8, 9); sitar (track 3); trumpet (tracks 1, 2, 8–10)
- Andy Parkin – violin (tracks 1, 4–7, 9)
- Tim Parkin – Rhodes piano (track 2), trumpet (track 8)
- Gary Plumley – flute (tracks 1, 3); saxophone (track 1)

Technical

- Paul Butler – mixing, production
- Guy Davie – mastering
- Jon McMullen – engineering
- Robin Schmidt – mastering (track 5)

Artwork

- Benjamin Etridge – photography
- Markus Karlsson – art direction, design
- Gerard Saint – art direction

== Charts ==
=== Weekly charts ===
Weekly chart performance for Home Again
Chart (2012)	Peak position
Australian Albums (ARIA)	67
Austrian Albums (Ö3 Austria)	13
Belgian Albums (Ultratop Flanders)	2
Belgian Albums (Ultratop Wallonia)	26
Danish Albums (Hitlisten)	16
Dutch Albums (Album Top 100)	1
French Albums (SNEP)	3
German Albums (Offizielle Top 100)	17
Irish Albums (IRMA)	16
Italian Albums (FIMI)	61
New Zealand Albums (RMNZ)	17
Norwegian Albums (VG-lista)	3
Portuguese Albums (AFP)	17
Scottish Albums (Official Charts)	7
Swedish Albums (Sverigetopplistan)	8
Swiss Albums (Schweizer Hitparade)	13
UK Albums (Official Charts)	4
US Billboard 200	86
US Americana/Folk Albums (Billboard)	4
US Top Rock Albums (Billboard)	32

=== Year-end charts ===
Annual chart performance for Home Again
Chart	Year	Position
Belgian Albums (Ultratop Flanders)	2012	23
Dutch Albums (Album Top 100)	2012	45
French Albums (SNEP)	2012	92
UK Albums (OCC)	2012	97
US Folk Albums (Billboard)	2012	23
US Folk Albums (Billboard)	2013	50

== Certifications and sales ==
Certifications for Home Again
Region	Certification	Certified units/sales
France (SNEP)	Gold	50,000^{*}
Netherlands (NVPI)	Gold	25,000^{^}
Norway (IFPI Norway)	Gold	10,000^{‡}
United Kingdom (BPI)	Gold	101,300
^{*} Sales figures based on certification alone.^{^} Shipments figures based on certification alone.^{‡} Sales+streaming figures based on certification alone.

== Release history ==
Release history for Home Again
Country	Release date	Format(s)	Label
United Kingdom	12 March 2012	Digital download, CD, LP	Polydor Records
United States	8 May 2012	Digital download, CD, LP	Interscope
