= SynthMaster =

Semi-modular software synthesizer

- Developer(s): KV331 Audio
- Stable release: 2.9
- Operating system: Windows, Mac OS
- Type: Software synthesizer
- Licence: Proprietary
- Website: SynthMaster

SynthMaster is a semi-modular software synthesizer and effect plug-in in VST, Audio Units and RTAS formats, developed by KV331 Audio.

SynthMaster features many different synthesis methods including VA, Additive, Wavetable, Wavescanning, Phase Modulation, Frequency Modulation, Pulse Width Modulation, Ring Modulation, Amplitude Modulation, Physical Modelling and SFZ Sample Playback synthesis. It has multi-synthesis oscillators, analog modelled/digital filters, flexible effects routing with 11 types of high quality effects and a massive modulation architecture with 95 separate modulation sources and 650+ modulation targets.

== RTAS Release ==
On March 1, 2012, KV331 Audio released SynthMaster 2.5 in RTAS format.

With this latest update, SynthMaster 2.5 became compatible with Avid ProTools 8 and above on Windows 7, Mac OS X Snow Leopard and Mac OS X Lion operating systems.

== 64 Bit MacOSX Release ==
On February 2, 2012, KV331 Audio has updated SynthMaster for Windows and Mac OS X to version 2.5.4.133. In this latest update, SynthMaster became a native 64-bit VST/AU plug-in on Mac OS X.

In this update, the following features have been added to SynthMaster as well:

- Added online presets uploaded by registered users.
- Added a new (red) skin, created by Irion DaRonin.
- Added new global setting to enable/disable hiding older presets.
- Added new global setting to enable/disable bipolar easy parameters.
- For effect version of SynthMaster, oscillator type is set to "audioin" by default now.

== Version 2.5 Official Release ==
On October 11, 2011, KV331 Audio announced the official release of SynthMaster 2.5. Since the beta release of version 2.5 in October 2010, KV331 Audio have added the following features to SynthMaster:

- 400 New Factory Presets: SynthMaster 2.5 comes with 400 new factory presets from a world class team of sound designers: BigTone, Ümit UY (Insigna), Frank ‘Xenox’ Neumann, Teoman Pasinlioglu, Mr Shoufuku and Brian ‘Xenos’ Lee.
- SFZ Import: It is now possible with version 2.5 to generate SFZ files by dragging and dropping multiple WAV/AIFF samples onto an oscillator waveform display.
- Stereo Oscillators with Improved Unison: Oscillators in SynthMaster 2.5 have now stereo output. With the new “voices”, “pan spread” and “detune spread” parameters, each basic/wavescanning oscillator can have its own unison settings which eliminates the need to enable unison for all voice elements.
- Improved Arpeggiator: The number of steps in the arpeggiator is increased to 32, while classic arpeggiator modes such as up, down, updown, downup and as played are added as well. Drag and drop of MIDI files onto the arpeggiator display is also possible now so that monophonic/polyphonic sequences can be imported into the arpeggiator.
- Improved Modulation Architecture: The modulation architecture has been vastly improved, so that now there are 3 modulation sources available for each modulation target. A modulation matrix with 64 slots is also added. The matrix has filtering as well so that targets for a specific source, or sources for a specific target can be filtered and shown on the user interface.
- Improved Easy Parameters: The easy parameters can now be globally linked to MIDI controllers, and they can be assigned automatically by SynthMaster.
- Microtuning: SynthMaster now supports Scala tuning, so tuning can be set either for each preset or globally.
- Flexible Effects Routing: With version 2.5, there is no more the differentiation of layer/global effects. Each effect can be inserted on a layer or on one of the 2 global effect buses.

== Expansions ==
KV331 Audio released the following preset expansion packs for SynthMaster 2.5 so far:

1. Rob Lee EDM Expansion Pack 1

2. Rob Lee EDM Expansion Pack 2

3. Rob Lee EDM Expansion Pack 3

4. Rob Lee EDM Expansion Pack 4

5. Nori Ubukata Pop Hits Volume 1

6. Nori Ubukata Synth Giants Volume 1

7. Nori Ubukata Synth Giants Volume 2

8. Nori Ubukata Synth Giants Volume 3
