= Sunlight (Modestep song) =

Single by Modestep

from the album Evolution Theory
- Released: 12 August 2011
- Recorded: 2011
- Genre: Dubstep, drum & bass
- Length: 3:50
- Label: Polydor
- Songwriter(s): Josh Friend, Tony Friend, Matthew Curtis, Nick Tsang
- Producer(s): Modestep

Modestep singles chronology
"Feel Good" (2011)	"Sunlight" (2011)	"To the Stars" (2011)

"Sunlight" is a song by the London-based dubstep and electronic rock band Modestep, and the second single from their debut studio album, Evolution Theory. The single was released on 12 August 2011 in the United Kingdom as a digital download. On 21 August 2011 the song entered the UK Singles Chart at number 16. The song is known as "Sunlight (2011)" in download sites because the song was modified by the band from a 2010 demo version which was not released commercially.

== Music video ==
A music video to accompany the release of "Sunlight" was first released onto YouTube on 3 July 2011 at a total length of three minutes and fifty-five seconds. It features old age pensioners stealing alcohol from a supermarket, riding bicycles along a promenade and partying whilst a vinyl record with the Modestep logo on it plays in the background. The pensioners are later shown gambling and littering, and meet some younger girls who take them to a club where Modestep are playing live. One pensioner is shown taking cocaine as the tempo of the track speeds up, and then fire eaters provide entertainment whilst the pensioners dance. The video ends by flashing through clips of parties in numerous locations, and ends with three of the pensioners staggering along a pebbled beach.

When asked about the video, Josh stated that he and his brother had the idea to act how modern kids would at any age, so for the video, they gathered some elderly people and told them to smash up a room as best they can, the best ones got the part for the video.

== Track listing ==
Digital download
No.	Title	Length
1.	"Sunlight (2011)"	3:50
2.	"Sunlight (2011)" (Torqux & Twist Remix)	5:18
3.	"Sunlight (2011)" (Jacob Plant Remix)	4:11

== Chart performance ==
Chart (2011)	Peak position
Scotland (OCC)	25
UK Dance (OCC)	5
UK Singles (OCC)	16

== Release history ==
Region	Date	Format	Label
United Kingdom	12 August 2011	Digital download	Polydor Records
