= London Road (album) =

Studio album by Modestep
- Released: 25 May 2015
- Genre: Alternative rock, drum and bass, dubstep, electronic rock
- Length: 49:54; 59:13 (iTunes bonus version)
- Label: INgrooves/Max

Modestep chronology
Evolution Theory (2013)	London Road (2015)

Singles from London Road
- 1. "Snake" Released: 20 January 2015; 2. "Machines" Released: 23 February 2015

London Road is the second studio album by British electronic rock band Modestep. Name, start of pre-sales (23 February 2015) and release date (25 May 2015) through INgrooves label, were announced on 22 February 2015 in their live show Modestep Radio which was streamed on YouTube and their page.

== Background and recording ==
After the release of their debut Evolution Theory, Josh and Tony Friend took a year off from touring to work on their next record. The brothers had had two band members leave and were dissatisfied with how their first album had come together, saying it felt "rushed" as they were touring "300 days a year". With London Road, the band wanted to create a single, unified work that defined them as a band without it feeling like "a bunch of singles". Working with new band members Kyle Deek and Pat Lundy, London Road was announced on 22 February 2015, and released three months later.

The album features a number of collaborations. The opening song, "Damien", features a monologue by actor Alan Ford, while "Game Over" features six different grime MCs. Speaking about the high number of co-productions on the album, Josh stated:

With this record we wanted to work with the people who really inspired us and made us want to make more – and better – dubstep ourselves. Funtcase, Trolly Snatcha, Culprate… Those guys are the people who switched us onto it and we wanted to bring back that original vibe. Not the throwaway screechy dogshit that people are putting out for the sake of it. It’s bollocks. It’s a destructive force. And we want to fight that.

— Josh Friend

== Track listing ==
All music is composed by Modestep, if not specified.

No.	Title	Music	Length
1.	"Damien" (featuring FuntCase and Alan Ford)		3:44
2.	"Make You Mine" (featuring Teddy Killerz)		3:39
3.	"Machines"		4:34
4.	"On Our Own" (featuring Culprate)		4:04
5.	"Feel Alive"		4:29
6.	"Rainbow" (featuring The Partysquad)		3:50
7.	"Snake"		3:49
8.	"Nightbus Home"		4:03
9.	"Seams"		3:53
10.	"Sing" (featuring Trolley Snatcha)		5:31
11.	"Circles" (featuring Skindred)		4:18
12.	"Game Over" (featuring Big Narstie, Dialect, Discarda, Flowdan, Frisco & LayZ)	Modestep & Rude Kid	4:00
Total length:			49:54

iTunes bonus version
No.	Title	Length
13.	"Countdown" (featuring Genetix)	4:19
14.	"Mianite" (featuring Tom Syndicate)	5:00
Total length:		59:13

== Charts ==
Chart (2015)	Peak position
UK Albums (OCC)	73

== Release history ==
Region	Date	Format	Label
Worldwide	25 May 2015	Digital download, CD, vinyl	INgrooves/Max
