= Bones (Michael Kiwanuka song) =

Single by Michael Kiwanuka

from the album Home Again
- Released: 24 September 2012
- Recorded: 2011
- Genre: Soul
- Length: 3:45
- Label: Polydor Records
- Songwriter(s): Jamie Scott/Michael Kiwanuka
- Producer(s): Paul Butler

Michael Kiwanuka singles chronology
"I'll Get Along" (2012)	"Bones" (2012)	"Tell Me a Tale" (2013)

"Bones" is a song by British soul musician Michael Kiwanuka, from his debut studio album Home Again. It was released as the fourth single from the album in the United Kingdom via digital download on 24 September 2012. The song was written by Michael Kiwanuka & Jamie Scott and produced by Paul Butler.

== Background ==
On 9 August 2012 Michael announced that "Bones" would be released as the fourth single from his debut album Home Again in the United Kingdom on 24 September 2012.

== Track listing ==
7" vinyl
No.	Title	Length
1.	"Bones (Radio Mix)"
2.	"Bones (Alternate Mix)"

== Credits and personnel ==
- Lead vocals – Michael Kiwanuka
- Producers – Paul Butler
- Lyrics – Michael Kiwanuka
- Label: Polydor Records

== Chart performance ==
Chart performance for "Bones"
Chart (2012)	Peak position
Belgium (Ultratip Bubbling Under Flanders)	17
Belgium Urban (Ultratop Flanders)	50
Belgium (Ultratip Bubbling Under Wallonia)	34
Japan (Japan Hot 100)	92

== Release history ==
Release history for "Bones"
Region	Date	Format	Label
United Kingdom	24 September 2012	Digital download	Polydor Records
