= DJ SS =

British DJ and a record producer

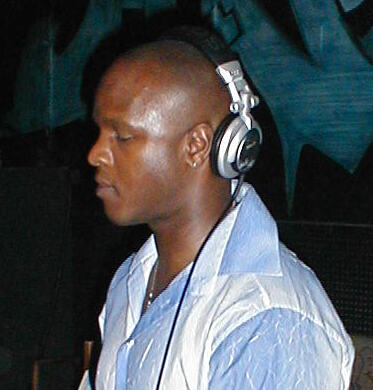
- DJ SS in 2004

Background information
- Born: Leroy Small; 27 August 1970 (age 55); Leicester, England
- Genres: Drum and bass
- Occupations: Producer, DJ
- Labels: Formation, Benz-Street

Leroy Small (born 27 August 1970 in Leicester, England), better known as DJ SS, is a British drum and bass DJ and record producer.

== Biography ==
SS started out as a hip hop and rare groove DJ in his home-town of Leicester, and was originally known as Scratchen Stein (later shortened to SS).

When the hardcore scene exploded in the UK in the early 1990s, he and his partner Eidris started promoting their own parties called Total Kaos every Friday in Leicester. They also put on one of the first large indoor parties at Donington Park in the summer of 1991. It was an amazing success and 6,000 people danced till dawn. Since then he has gone on to DJ worldwide.

SS is the co-founder of the label Formation Records, which has spawned over 30 sub-labels. The label would play a pivotal role for artists and producers such as Tango, John B, and Twisted Individual. The label was particularly prolific from 1991 to 1994, releasing many breakbeat hardcore and jungle classics, such as The Psycho EP, the Colour Series, Rhythm for Reasons, Breakbeat Pressure and in 1995, his and the label's biggest track, the Love Story theme-sampling "The Lighter". It is a track that has remained incredibly popular and still continues to be played years on.

SS has featured on radio shows such as BBC 1Xtra's D&B M1X, on which he put together an hour-long mix of Formation tracks and was interviewed about his career.
