= Show Me a Sign =

Single by Modestep

from the album Evolution Theory
- Released: 6 May 2012
- Recorded: 2011
- Genre: Dubstep; punk rock; hard rock
- Length: 4:32
- Label: Polydor
- Songwriter(s): Josh Friend, Tony Friend, Matthew Curtis, Nick Tsang
- Producer(s): Modestep

Modestep singles chronology
"To the Stars" (2011)	"Show Me a Sign" (2012)	"Another Day" (2013)

"Show Me a Sign" is a song by the London-based dubstep and electronic rock band Modestep, and the fourth single from their debut studio album Evolution Theory. The single was first released on 6 May 2012 in the United Kingdom as a digital download. The song appears in the trailer of the racing video game Forza Horizon, as well as being on one of the radio stations within the game itself.

== Music video ==
A music video to accompany the release of "Show Me a Sign" was first released onto YouTube on 19 March 2012 at a total length of five minutes and fifty-six seconds. It depicts a group of assassin women making attacks on the commercial music industry.

== Track listing ==
Digital download
No.	Title	Length
1.	"Show Me a Sign"	4:32
2.	"Show Me a Sign" (Camo & Krooked Remix)	4:26
3.	"Show Me a Sign" (Phear Phace Remix)	5:05
4.	"Show Me a Sign" (Todd Edwards Dub Remix)	6:12
5.	"Paradise" (Coldplay Cover) (pre-order exclusive)	4:08

== Chart performance ==
Chart (2012)	Peak position
UK Dance (OCC)	12
UK Singles (The Official Charts Company)	56

== Release history ==
Region	Date	Format	Label
United Kingdom	6 May 2012	Digital download	Polydor Records
