= The Voice of Germany season 2 =

The Voice of Germany
- Season 2
- Hosted by: Thore Schölermann; Doris Golpashin (V Reporter)
- Judges: Nena; Xavier Naidoo; Rea Garvey; The BossHoss
- Winner: Nick Howard
- Winning coach: Rea Garvey
- Runner-up: Isabell Schmidt

Release
- Original network: ProSieben and Sat.1
- Original release: October 28 – December 14, 2012

Season chronology
- ← Previous; Season 1 Next → Season 3

The Voice of Germany (season 2) is a German reality talent show that premiered on 18 October 2012 on ProSieben and Sat.1. Based on the reality singing competition The Voice of Holland, the series was created by Dutch television producer John de Mol. It is part of an international series. Nick Howard was announced the winner of the season, making him the first winning artist born outside of Germany. This also marks Rea Garvey's first win as a coach.

== The first phase: The Blind Auditions ==
Key	Coach hit his or her "I WANT YOU" button	Contestant eliminated with no coach pressing his or her "I WANT YOU" button	Contestant defaulted to this coach's team	Contestant elected to join this coach's team

=== Episode 1: October 18, 2012 ===
Order	Contestant	Song	Coaches' and Contestants' Choices			
Order	Contestant	Song	Nena	Xavier Naidoo	Rea Garvey	The BossHoss
1	Christin Kieu	"Je veux"	—	—		
2	Neo	"Mad World"				
3	Tiffany Kirkland	"Perfect World"	—	—	—	
4	Matt Voodoo	"I Follow Rivers"	—	—	—	—
5	Jesper Jürgens	"(You Make Me Feel Like) A Natural Man"				
6	Jessica Mears	"When Love Takes Over"	—	—		
7	Selima Taibi	"Run"	—	—	—	—
8	Brigitte Lorenz	"Misery"		—	—	—
9	James Borges	"Like a Hobo"	—	—	—	
10	Nick Howard	"I Won't Give Up"				
11	Adam Sly Wieneke	"So Sick"	—	—	—	—
12	Jenna Hoff	"Next to Me"				

=== Episode 2: October 19, 2012 ===
Order	Contestant	Song	Coaches' and Contestants' Choices			
Order	Contestant	Song	Nena	Xavier Naidoo	Rea Garvey	The BossHoss
1	Michael Heinemann	"Dancing On My Own"		—		
2	Giulia Wahn	"Warwick Avenue"	—	—	—	
3	Omid Mirzael	"A Song for You"				
4	Michelle Perera	"Mamma Knows Best"		—		
5	Tom Bogatu	"Drive By"	—	—	—	—
6	Daliah Stingl	"One and Only"	—		—	
7	Kim Greene	"Gambling Man"	—	—	—	—
8	Michael Lane	"Lego House"				—
9	Freaky T	"Ordinary People"	—		—	
10	Vanessa Henning	"Nobody Knows"	—	—	—	—
11	Eva Croissant	"Auf dem Weg"		—	—	—
12	Jörg Fricke	"I'm All Over It"	—	—	—	—
13	Aisata Blackman	"Nothing's Real But Love"				

=== Episode 3: October 25, 2012 ===
Order	Contestant	Song	Coaches' and Contestants' Choices			
Order	Contestant	Song	Nena	Xavier Naidoo	Rea Garvey	The BossHoss
1	Vinh Khuat	"Superstition"				—
2	Nathalie Dorra	"I Still Haven't Found What I'm Looking For"		—	—	—
3	Felix & Lukas Hain	"Too Close"				
4	Jenny Winkler	"Ohne Dich"	—	—	—	—
5	Keye Katcher	"Black and Gold"	—	—	—	
6	July Rumpf	"All This Time (Pick-Me-Up Song)"				
7	Dimi Rompos	"Mama Do (Uh Oh, Uh Oh)"	—	—	—	—
8	Gil Ofarim	"Crazy"	—		—	
9	Ron White	"Empire State of Mind"	—	—	—	—
10	Brandon Stone	"Ich Atme Ein"	—		—	—
11	Mel Verez	"It's a Man's Man's Man's World"	—	—	—	
12	Dennis LeGree	"Don't Let The Sun Go Down On Me"		—		

=== Episode 4: October 26, 2012 ===
Order	Contestant	Song	Coaches' and Contestants' Choices			
Order	Contestant	Song	Nena	Xavier Naidoo	Rea Garvey	The BossHoss
1	Iveta Mukuchyan	"Euphoria"	—		—	—
2	Manumatei	"The Man Who Can't Be Moved"				—
3	Lida Martel	"I Follow Rivers"	—	—	—	
4	Luca Sportiello	"Black and Gold"	—			—
5	Marcel Beuter	"Wonderwall"				
6	Shave Randle	"Just Can't Live Without Each Other Love"	—	—	—	—
7	Bianca Böhme	"Nobody's Perfect"				
8	John Jones	"Heart of Stone"	—	—	—	—
9	Laura Buschhagen	"The Way I Am"		—	—	—
10	Alina Duwe	"You Belong with Me"	—	—		
11	Karo Frühner	"Save Me from Myself"		—		—
12	Raffa Shira Banggard	"Another Day"	—	—	—	
13	Ilan Green	"Eternity"	—	—	—	—

=== Episode 5: November 1, 2012 ===
Order	Contestant	Song	Coaches' and Contestants' Choices			
Order	Contestant	Song	Nena	Xavier Naidoo	Rea Garvey	The BossHoss
1	Jonathan Wuermeling	"Titanium"	—	—	—	—
2	Nele Kohrs	"People Help the People"				
3	Sami & Samira Badawi	"I Won't Give Up"		—	—	—
4	Sarah Kiene	"Stuck"	—	—	—	—
5	Sebastian Hämer	"Sag Einfach Ja"	—	—		—
6	Sandra Amerie	"Without You"	—		—	
7	Kevin Staudt	"Read My Mind"		—	—	—
8	Devin Martini	"Rebel Yell"	—	—	—	—
9	Momo Djender	"1973"	—			
10	Madeleine Müller	"Hard to Handle"		—	—	
11	Andreas Nguyen	"So Sick"	—	—	—	—
12	Jonas Hein	"In Diesem Moment"	—		—	—
13	Michel Schmied	"Behind Blue Eyes"		—	—	—
14	Maja Mo	"You and I"	—	—	—	
15	Rayland Horton	"You Make It Real"				

=== Episode 6: November 2, 2012 ===
Order	Contestant	Song	Coaches' and Contestants' Choices			
Order	Contestant	Song	Nena	Xavier Naidoo	Rea Garvey	The BossHoss
1	Marcel Gabriel	"Summertime Sadness"	—		—	
2	Evi Lankora	"Ich Bin Ich"	—	—		—
3	Rob Fowler	"Payphone"	—	—		
4	Anna Boger	"Arms"	—	—	—	—
5	Mirko Bierstedt	"Change"		—	—	
6	Sam Leigh Brown	"Dreams"	—		—	—
7	Steffen Reusch	"Jar of Hearts"	—			
8	Ronja Fischer	"Red"	—	—		—
9	Kristin Lohse	"Love for a child"	—	—		—
10	Yvi Szoncsó	"Stuck"	—	—		—
11	Hannah Pearl	"Halo"	—	—		—
12	Menna Mulugeta	"Call Me Maybe"		—	—	—
13	Valentin Merk	"1973"		—	—	—
14	Sascha Lien	"Don't Stop Believin'"		—	—	—
15	Isabelle Schmidt	"Breakeven"		—	—	—
16	Marion Bialecki	"A Song For You"		—	—	—
17	Chris Werner	"Ich Laufe"	—	—	—	—
18	Sascha Wiegand	"Called Out In The Dark"	—	—	—	
19	Cristiano de Brito	"Auf Dem Weg"	—		—	—
20	Mari Harutyunyan	"Heaven"				

== The second phase: The Battle Rounds ==
In the battle rounds, candidates from one team are paired off against each other, singing the same song. Only one of the two candidates advances to the next round. Xavier Naidoo and The Boss Hoss had picked up 17 candidates in the blind auditions. Since only 8 candidates from each team can advance, each of these teams has one three-way battle, from which only one candidate will advance to the next round.

– Battle Winner

=== Episode 7: November 8, 2012 ===
Order	Coach	Contestant	Contestant	Contestant	Song
1.	The BossHoss	James Borges	Marcel Beuter		"Best of You"
2.	Xavier Naidoo	Sam Leigh Brown	Jesper Jürgens		"Would I Lie to You?"
3.	Nena	Neo	Laura Buschhagen		"Wish You Were Here"
4.	Rea Garvey	Jessica Mears	Bianca Böhme		"Telephone"
5.	The BossHoss	Giulia Wahn	Raffa Shira Banggard		"Say Say Say"
6.	Nena	Kevin Staudt	Isabell Schmidt		"Where the Wild Roses Grow"
7.	Xavier Naidoo	Vinh Khuat	Momo Djender		"Desert Rose"

=== Episode 8: November 9, 2012 ===
Order	Coach	Contestant	Contestant	Contestant	Song
1.	Rea Garvey	Jenna Hoff	Luca Sportiello		"Come Together"
2.	Xavier Naidoo	Jonas Hein	Brandon Stone		"Symphonie"
3.	Nena	Nathalie Dorra	Aisata Blackman		"You Can't Always Get What You Want"
4.	Rea Garvey	Dennis LeGree	Michelle Perera		"Tainted Love"
5.	The BossHoss	Alina Duwe	Christin Kieu		"I Will Dance (When I Walk Away)"
6.	Xavier Naidoo	Sandra Amerie	Michael Lane		"Everybody Hurts"
7.	Rea Garvey	Ronja Fischer	Rayland Horton		"Broken Strings"
8.	Nena	Manumatei	Sami & Samira Badawi		"20.000 Meilen"

=== Episode 9: November 15, 2012 ===
Order	Coach	Contestant	Contestant	Contestant	Song
1.	The BossHoss	Rob Fowler	Felix & Lucas Hein		"Stop and Stare"
2.	Rea Garvey	Yvi Szoncsó	Nick Howard		"Home Again"
3.	Xavier Naidoo	Nele Kohrs	Marcel Gabriel		"Summer Wine"
4.	Nena	Marion Bialecki	Brigitte Lorenz		"My Baby Just Cares For Me"
5.	Rea Garvey	Hannah Pearl	Michael Heinemann		"Don't Give Up"
6.	Nena	Sascha Lien	Michel Schmied		"Come As You Are"
7.	Xavier Naidoo	Cristiano de Brito	Gil Ofarim		"Reichtum der Welt"
8.	The BossHoss	MayaMo	Madeleine Müller	Tiffany Kirkland	"Stone Cold Sober"

=== Episode 10: November 16, 2012 ===
Order	Coach	Contestant	Contestant	Contestant	Song
1.	The BossHoss	Keye Katcher	Sascha Wiegand		"Mr. Brightside"
2.	Nena	Menna Mulugeta	July Rumpf		"Burn It Down"
3.	Xavier Naidoo	Daliah Stingl	Freaky T		"Sign Your Name"
4.	Rea Garvey	Karo Frühner	Sebastian Hämer		"Morgen"
5.	The BossHoss	Mel Verez	Lida Martel		"Black Hole Sun"
6.	Nena	Valentin Merk	Eva Croissant		"Ich liebe diese Tage"
7.	The BossHoss	Mirko Bierstedt	Steffen Reusch		"The Scientist"
8.	Rea Garvey	Evi Lankora	Kristin Lohse		"Liebe ist"
9.	Xavier Naideoo	Iveta Mukuchyan	Mari Harutyunyan	Omid Mirzaei	"Many Rivers to Cross"

== The third phase: The Live Shows ==
In this season, the finalist for each team will be decided in a knock out format. In each duel, the coach and the public have a 50% say in the outcome of each duel. In the final, the public will decide alone.

=== Episode 11: November 22, 2012 ===
==== Team BossHoss ====
Order	Contestant	Song	Jury points	Public vote	Total	Result
1.	Tiffany Kirkland	"Read All About It (Part III)"	46%	22.32%	68.32%	Eliminated
2.	Rob Fowler	"Billie Jean"	54%	77.68%	131.68%	Safe

Order	Contestant	Song	Jury points	Public vote	Total	Result
1.	Christin Kieu	"True Colors"	35%	39.31%	74.31%	Eliminated
2.	James Borges	"Wire To Wire"	65%	60.69%	125.69%	Safe

==== Team Nena ====
Order	Contestant	Song	Jury points	Public vote	Total	Result
1.	Isabell Schmidt	"Twist In My Sobriety"	54%	62.90%	116.90%	Safe
2.	Michel Schmied	"Such a Shame"	46%	37.10%	83.10%	Eliminated

Order	Contestant	Song	Jury points	Public vote	Total	Result
1.	Brigitte Lorenz	"Ich glaub, 'ne Dame werd ich nie"	60%	56.37%	116.37%	Safe
2.	Sami & Samira Badawi	"Lila Wolken"	40%	43.63%	83.63%	Eliminated

==== Team Rea ====
Order	Contestant	Song	Jury points	Public vote	Total	Result
1.	Bianca Böhme	"Déjà Vu"	45%	56.67%	101.67%	Safe
2.	Michelle Perera	"If I Were a Boy"	55%	43.33%	98.33%	Eliminated

Order	Contestant	Song	Jury points	Public vote	Total	Result
1.	Evi Lancora	"Zünde alle Feuer"	40%	16.87%	56.87%	Eliminated
2.	Michael Heinemann	"The Blower's Daughter"	60%	83.13%	143.13%	Safe

==== Team Xavier ====
Order	Contestant	Song	Jury points	Public vote	Total	Result
1.	Marcel Gabriel	"Stay"	57%	27.30%	84.30%	Eliminated
2.	Jesper Jürgens	"Gloria"	43%	72.70%	115.70%	Safe

Order	Contestant	Song	Jury points	Public vote	Total	Result
1.	Freaky T	"Freak Like Me"	43%	57.67%	100.67%	Safe
2.	Iveta Mukuchyan	"More"	57%	42.33%	99.33%	Eliminated

=== Episode 12: November 23, 2012 ===
==== Team BossHoss ====
Order	Contestant	Song	Jury points	Public vote	Total	Result
1.	Lida Martel	"After Dark"	44%	40.57%	84.57%	Eliminated
2.	Steffen Reusch	"Drunk In The Morning"	56%	59.43%	115.43%	Safe

Order	Contestant	Song	Jury points	Public vote	Total	Result
1.	Keye Katcher	"GoldenEye"	54%	21.50%	75.50%	Eliminated
2.	Raffa Shira Banggard	"Du erinnerst mich an Liebe"	46%	78.50%	124.50%	Safe

==== Team Nena ====
Order	Contestant	Song	Jury points	Public vote	Total	Result
1.	Aisata Blackman	"Take On Me"	55%	20.18%	75.18%	Eliminated
2.	Menna Mulugeta	"Diamonds"	45%	79.82%	124.82%	Safe

Order	Contestant	Song	Jury points	Public vote	Total	Result
1.	Eva Croissant	"Du oder ich (oder wir alle)"	50%	58.33%	108.33%	Safe
2.	Neo	"My Immortal"	50%	41.67%	91.67%	Eliminated

==== Team Rea ====
Order	Contestant	Song	Jury points	Public vote	Total	Result
1.	Rayland Horton	"How Am I Supposed to Live Without You"	43%	36.36%	79.36%	Eliminated
2.	Nick Howard	"We Are Young"	57%	63.64%	120.64%	Safe

Order	Contestant	Song	Jury points	Public vote	Total	Result
1.	Karo Fruhner	"Dog Days Are Over"	40%	37.29%	77.29%	Eliminated
2.	Jenna Hoff	"Nothing Else Matters"	60%	62.71%	122.71%	Safe

==== Team Xavier ====
Order	Contestant	Song	Jury points	Public vote	Total	Result
1.	Momo Djender	"Beautiful Day"	50%	25.50%	75.50%	Eliminated
2.	Gil Ofarim	"Iris"	50%	74.50%	124.50%	Safe

Order	Contestant	Song	Jury points	Public vote	Total	Result
1.	Brandon Stone	"Halt mich"	58%	23.05%	81.05%	Eliminated
2.	Michael Lane	"7 Days"	42%	76.95%	118.95%	Safe

=== Episode 13: November 29, 2012 ===
==== Team BossHoss ====
Order	Contestant	Song	Jury points	Public vote	Total	Result
1.	Steffen Reusch	"High and Dry"	59%	25.86%	84.86%	Eliminated
2.	Rob Fowler	"What I've Done"	41%	74.14%	115.14%	Safe

==== Team Nena ====
Order	Contestant	Song	Jury points	Public vote	Total	Result
1.	Menna Mulugeta	"Move in the Right Direction"	49%	36.32%	85.32%	Eliminated
2.	Brigitte Lorenz	"So leb' dein Leben"	51%	63.68%	114.68%	Safe

==== Team Rea ====
Order	Contestant	Song	Jury points	Public vote	Total	Result
1.	Jenna Hoff	"Skyfall"	50%	30.54%	80.54%	Eliminated
2.	Michael Heinemann	"Treading Water"	50%	69.46%	119.46%	Safe

==== Team Xavier ====
Order	Contestant	Song	Jury points	Public vote	Total	Result
1.	Freaky T	"Frozen"	57%	43.73%	100.73%	Safe
2.	Jesper Jürgens	"Zurück"	43%	56.27%	99.27%	Eliminated

=== Episode 14: November 30, 2012 ===
==== Team BossHoss ====
Order	Contestant	Song	Jury points	Public vote	Total	Result
1.	James Borges	"Mr. Bojangles"	60%	48,84%	108,84%	Safe
2.	Raffa Shira Banggard	"Missing"	40%	51,16%	91,16%	Eliminated

==== Team Nena ====
Order	Contestant	Song	Jury points	Public vote	Total	Result
1.	Eva Croissant	"Still"	50%	42.32%	92.32%	Eliminated
2.	Isabell Schmidt	"Losing My Religion"	50%	57.68%	107.68%	Safe

==== Team Rea ====
Order	Contestant	Song	Jury points	Public vote	Total	Result
1.	Nick Howard	"Yellow"	50%	60,01%	110,01%	Safe
2.	Bianca Böhme	"It Will Rain"	50%	39,99%	89,99%	Eliminated

==== Team Xavier ====
Order	Contestant	Song	Jury points	Public vote	Total	Result
1.	Gil Ofarim	"Man in the Mirror"	47%	41.43%	88.43%	Eliminated
2.	Michael Lane	"Angel"	53%	58.57%	111.57%	Safe

=== Episode 15: December 7, 2012 ===
==== Team BossHoss ====
Order	Contestant	Song	Jury points	Public vote	Total	Result
1.	Rob Fowler	"The Hurt"	52%	42,29%	94,29%	Eliminated
2.	James Borges	"Lonely"	48%	57,71%	105,71%	Safe

==== Team Nena ====
Order	Contestant	Song	Jury points	Public vote	Total	Result
1.	Brigitte Lorenz	"Wenn ich dich nicht hätte"	49%	30,42%	79,42%	Eliminated
2.	Isabell Schmidt	"Heimweh"	51%	69,58%	120,58%	Safe

==== Team Rea ====
Order	Contestant	Song	Jury points	Public vote	Total	Result
1.	Michael Heinemann	"Words (Try to Hold On)"	47%	31,34%	78,34%	Eliminated
2.	Nick Howard	"Unbreakable"	53%	68,66%	121,66%	Safe

==== Team Xavier ====
Order	Contestant	Song	Jury points	Public vote	Total	Result
1.	Michael Lane	"Mrs. Lawless"	no voting	no voting	no voting	Safe
2.	Freaky T	"Inferno"	no voting	no voting	no voting	Retirement

=== Episode 16: December 14, 2012 ===
Each contestant perform his winner's song, a duet with the coach and a celebrity duet.

Winner's songs

Performance Order	Coach	Contestant	Song	Result
2	Xavier Naidoo	Michael Lane	"Mrs. Lawless"	Third place (22.20%)
5	Nena	Isabell Schmidt	"Heimweh"	Runner-up (28.85%)
8	Rea Garvey	Nick Howard	"Unbreakable"	Winner (41.04%)
11	The BossHoss	James Borges	"Lonely"	Fourth place (7.89%)

Coaches' duet

Performance Order	Coach	Contestant	Song
1	Nena	Isabell Schmidt	"Finderlohn"
4	Rea Garvey	Nick Howard	"One Day Like This"
7	The BossHoss	James Borges	"It's Not Unusual"
10	Xavier Naidoo	Michael Lane	"Cruisin'"

Celebrity Duet

Performance Order	Coach	Contestant	Celebrity performer	Song
3	The BossHoss	James Borges	Nelly Furtado	"Waiting For The Night"
6	Xavier Naidoo	Michael Lane	Leona Lewis	"Trouble"
9	Nena	Isabell Schmidt	Birdy	"People Help The People"
12	Rea Garvey	Nick Howard	Emeli Sandé	"Read All About It (Part III)"

== Elimination Chart ==
=== Overall ===
Color key
Artist's info

- Artist from Team Xavier Naidoo
- Artist from Team TheBossHoss
- Artist from Team Rea Garvey
- Artist from Team Nena

Result details

- Winner
- Runner-up
- Third place
- Fourth place
- Artist was saved
- Artist was eliminated
- Artist did not perform on that particular week

Live show results per week
Artist	Week 1	Week 2	Week 3	Week 4	Week 5	Finals
Nick Howard		Safe		Safe	Safe	Winner
Isabell Schmidt	Safe			Safe	Safe	Runner-Up
Michael Lane		Safe		Safe	Safe	3rd place
James Borges	Safe			Safe	Safe	4th place
Rob Fowler	Safe		Safe		Eliminated	Eliminated (Week 5)
Brigitte Lorenz	Safe		Safe		Eliminated	Eliminated (Week 5)
Michael Heinemann	Safe		Safe		Eliminated	Eliminated (Week 5)
Freaky T	Safe		Safe		Eliminated	Eliminated (Week 5)
Eva Croissant		Safe		Eliminated	Eliminated (Week 4)	
Raffa Shira Banggard		Safe		Eliminated	Eliminated (Week 4)	
Bianca Böhme	Safe			Eliminated	Eliminated (Week 4)	
Gil Ofarim		Safe		Eliminated	Eliminated (Week 4)	
Jasper Jürgens	Safe		Eliminated	Eliminated (Week 3)		
Menna Mulugeta		Safe	Eliminated	Eliminated (Week 3)		
Steffen Reusch		Safe	Eliminated	Eliminated (Week 3)		
Jenna Hoff		Safe	Eliminated	Eliminated (Week 3)		
Neo		Eliminated	Eliminated (Week 2)			
Lida Martel		Eliminated	Eliminated (Week 2)			
Brandon Stone		Eliminated	Eliminated (Week 2)			
Rayland Horton		Eliminated	Eliminated (Week 2)			
Karo Fruhner		Eliminated	Eliminated (Week 2)			
Keye Katcher		Eliminated	Eliminated (Week 2)			
Momo Djender		Eliminated	Eliminated (Week 2)			
Aisata Blackman		Eliminated	Eliminated (Week 2)			
Iveta Mukuchyan	Eliminated	Eliminated (Week 1)				
Michelle Perera	Eliminated	Eliminated (Week 1)				
Marcel Gabriel	Eliminated	Eliminated (Week 1)				
Sami & Samira Badawi	Eliminated	Eliminated (Week 1)				
Michel Schmied	Eliminated	Eliminated (Week 1)				
Christin Kieu	Eliminated	Eliminated (Week 1)				
Tiffany Kirkland	Eliminated	Eliminated (Week 1)				
Evi Lancora	Eliminated	Eliminated (Week 1)				

== Ratings ==
Episode	Date	Viewers		Market share	
Episode	Date	Total	14 to 49 years	Total	14 to 49 years
Blind Audition 1	18 Oct 2012 (on Prosieben)	4.69 Mio.	3.46 Mio.	15.5%	28.5%
Blind Audition 2	19 Oct 2012 (on Sat.1)	5.24 Mio.	3.49 Mio.	19.7%	30.4%
Blind Audition 3	25 Oct 2012 (on Prosieben)	4.66 Mio.	3.30 Mio.	15.4%	25.3%
Blind Audition 4	26 Oct 2012 (on Sat.1)	4.83 Mio.	3.28 Mio.	15.4%	27.3%
Blind Audition 5	1 Nov 2012 (on Prosieben)	4.90 Mio.	3.36 Mio.	15.1%	26.0%
Blind Audition 6	2 Nov 2012 (on Sat.1)	4.85 Mio.	3.30 Mio.	15.7%	28.0%
Battles 1	8 Nov 2012 (on Prosieben)	4.17 Mio.	3.02 Mio.	13.4%	24.2%
Battles 2	9 Nov 2012 (on Sat.1)	4.54 Mio.	2.96 Mio.	14.2%	25.7%
Battles 3	15 Nov 2012 (on Prosieben)	4.38 Mio.	3.15 Mio.	14.1%	25.3%
Battles 4	16 Nov 2012 (on Sat.1)	4.12 Mio.	2.60 Mio.	13.8%	23.1%
Live Show 1	22 Nov 2012 (on Prosieben)	3.11 Mio.	2.19 Mio.	10.7%	18.5%
Live Show 2	23 Nov 2012 (on Sat.1)	3.29 Mio.	2.12 Mio.	10.8%	19.4%
Live Show 3	29 Nov 2012 (on Prosieben)	3.50 Mio.	2.34 Mio.	11.7%	19.8%
Live Show 4	30 Nov 2012 (on Sat.1)	3.29 Mio.	1.98 Mio.	13.2%	18.3%
Live Show 5	7 Dec 2012 (on Sat.1)	2.96 Mio.	1.85 Mio.	10.2%	17.3%
Final	14 Dec 2012 (on Sat.1)	3.42 Mio.	2.12 Mio.	16.1%	19.7%
