= Format B =

German tech house duo

Format:B
- Also known as: Jozef Mauritz
- Origin: Berlin, Germany
- Genres: Tech house; deep house
- Years active: 2004–present
- Labels: Formatik Records, Toolroom Records, Highgrade Recordings, Stil vor Talent, Opossum Recordings
- Members: Franciskus Sell; Jakob Hildenbrand
- Website: formatb.com

Format B (stylised as Format:B) is a German tech house duo consisting of Franciskus Sell and Jakob Hildenbrand. Their single "Chunky" reached #29 on the UK Singles Chart upon its release on 13 November 2015.

== Background ==
Format B consists of Franciskus Sell and Jacob Hildenbrand, both from Germany. Sell hailed from Erfurt while Hildenbrand was based in Berlin, and they met while attending courses at SAE Institute Berlin. The pair began releasing 12 inches on Highgrade Records in 2005, followed by releases on Stil Vor Talent and Opossum Recordings; they returned to Highgrade for the release of their debut album, Steam Circuit, in late 2008.

For a year or so, until late 2009, they became in-demand DJs and toured all over the world, after which the pair founded the vanity label Formatik Records and used it to release their own records such the club hits "Gospel" and "Dog Tag", and then records by those they had signed such as Daniel Steinberg, DJ Madskillz, and Tobi Kramer. In conjunction with this, they became the resident DJs at Club Watergate in Berlin, and in late 2011 released their second album, Restless, followed by a series of remix 12 inches the following year, both on Formatik Records.

Their single "Chunky" was first released in late 2014 on Formatik Records but was re-released on 13 November 2015 on Ministry of Sound with a supporting music video. It extensively samples "Function at the Junction" by Shorty Long, and appeared on The Annual 2016 on 6 November 2015.

== Discography ==
=== Albums and LPs ===
- Steam Circuit (2008)
- Restless LP (2011)
- 5 Years of Formatik - The Birthday Chapter (2014)

=== EPs ===
- Vivian Wheeler (2007)
- Split Pot (2008)
- Dawn (2013)
- Aye Patch (2013)
- Charlie Runkle (2014)
- Mama Don't Know (2014)
- Okeey Yaaah (2016)
- Not Enufff (2017)
- Humpy & Crumpy (2018)

=== Sample packs ===
- Tech House Signature Cuts by Format:B (2018)

=== Singles ===
- "Bronson Road" (2004)
- "Cosa Nostra Funk" (2006)
- "Slaps" (2007)
- "Gunface" (2008)
- "Dog Tag" (2010)
- "Gospel" (2010)
- "Coltrane" / "Sexus" (2013) (with Pleasurekraft ft. Chris The Voice)
- "Magic Button" (2013)
- "Der Samtfalter" (2014)
- "Human Dynamo" (2014) (with Roy Rosenfeld)
- "Chunky" (2014)
- "Rocket Bunny" (2015)
