= Feel Good (Modestep song) =

Single by Modestep

from the album Evolution Theory
- Released: 6 February 2011
- Recorded: 2010
- Genre: Dubstep, electronic rock
- Length: 4:15
- Label: AEI Music
- Songwriter(s): Josh Friend, Tony Friend, Matthew Curtis, Nick Tsang
- Producer(s): Modestep

Modestep singles chronology
"Feel Good" (2011)	"Sunlight" (2011)

"Feel Good" is the debut single from London-based dubstep/electronic rock band Modestep, and the lead single from their debut album Evolution Theory. The single was released on 6 February 2011 in the United Kingdom as a digital download. The song entered the UK Singles Chart at number 38.

== Music video ==
A music video to accompany the release of "Feel Good" was first released onto YouTube on 24 December 2010 at a total length of four minutes and twenty-five seconds.

== Track listing ==
Digital download
No.	Title	Length
1.	"Feel Good"	4:15
2.	"Bite The Hand"	3:54
3.	"Feel Good" (Statelapse Remix)	5:26

== Release history ==
Region	Date	Format	Label
United Kingdom	30 January 2011	Digital download	AEI Music
