= I'm Getting Ready =

I'm Getting Ready EP
- EP artwork

EP by Michael Kiwanuka
- Released: 24 July 2011 (EP); 11 March 2012 (Single)
- Recorded: 2011
- Genre: folk rock
- Length: 3:25
- Label: Communion Records; Polydor
- Producer: Paul Butler

Michael Kiwanuka chronology
iTunes Festival: London 2011 (2011)	I'm Getting Ready EP (2011)	Home Again (2012)

I'm Getting Ready (Single)
- Single artwork

Michael Kiwanuka singles chronology
"Home Again" (2012)	"I'm Getting Ready" (2012)	"I'll Get Along" (2012)

"I'm Getting Ready" is an EP and song by British soul musician Michael Kiwanuka. The I'm Getting Ready EP was first released in the United Kingdom on 24 July 2011. Following the release of Kiwanuka's debut single "Home Again", "I'm Getting Ready" was issued as the second single taken from his debut studio album, Home Again on 11 March 2012. For the single release, "I'm Getting Ready" was playlisted by both BBC Radio 1 and BBC Radio 2.

== Music videos ==
Two music videos have been produced for "I'm Getting Ready". The first video was released in September 2011 by Communion Records in promotion of Kiwanuka's I'm Getting Ready EP. The second video was released in February 2012 by Polydor and accompanied the single release of "I'm Getting Ready".

== Track listing ==
EP (Digital download, 10" vinyl)
No.	Title	Length
1.	"I'm Getting Ready"	2:25
2.	"I Need You by My Side"	2:36
3.	"Any Day Will Do Fine"	3:39

Single (Digital download, 7" vinyl)
No.	Title	Length
1.	"I'm Getting Ready"	2:21
2.	"Lasan"	4:38

== Chart performance ==
On 8 January 2012, "I'm Getting Ready" debuted at number twenty-six on the UK independent releases chart.

Chart performance for I'm Getting Ready
Chart (2012)	Peak position
UK Indie (OCC)	26

== Release history ==
Release history for I'm Getting Ready
Region	Date	Version	Format	Label
United Kingdom	24 July 2011	EP	Digital download, 10" vinyl	Communion Records
United Kingdom	11 March 2012	Single	Digital download	Polydor
United Kingdom	2 April 2012	Single	7" vinyl	Communion Records
