= To the Stars (song) =

Single by Modestep

from the album Evolution Theory
- Released: 4 November 2011
- Recorded: 2011
- Genre: Dubstep, hard rock, electronic rock
- Length: 3:58
- Label: Polydor
- Songwriter(s): Josh Friend, Tony Friend, Matthew Curtis, Nick Tsang
- Producer(s): Modestep

Modestep singles chronology
"Sunlight" (2011)	"To the Stars" (2011)	"Show Me a Sign" (2012)

"To the Stars" is a song by the London-based dubstep and electronic rock band Modestep, and the third single from their debut studio album Evolution Theory. The single was released on 4 November 2011 in the United Kingdom as a digital download. It peaked at number 45 in the UK Singles Chart.

== Music video ==
The video was released on 17 October 2011 and is 4 minutes long. At the start of the video it features panning shots of a messy but temporarily vacant room with a video of Modestep performing the song playing on a computer in the room. Just before the chorus begins, the video moves away from the house upwards gradually into space, revealing the fact the house is located in Brazil. From then on the video features slow motion footage of the band performing against a dark background and footage of various galaxies and nebulae, including planetary nebulae and the famous Horsehead Nebula which is shown near the end of the space sequence, at which point the camera returns downwards to the house again and the video ends.

A video featuring the Break The Noize & The Autobots remix was uploaded onto YouTube by UKF Dubstep before the original video on 5 October 2011. The video shows the band backstage, on the road, moshing and at various concerts which they played at during the summer of 2011.

== Track listing ==
Digital download
No.	Title	Length
1.	"To the Stars"	3:57
2.	"To the Stars" (Break the Noize & The Autobots Remix)	3:51
3.	"To the Stars" (Phear Phace & SOS Remix)	4:48
4.	"To the Stars" (Document One Remix)	5:58
5.	"To the Stars" (Rob Da Bank Remix)	5:18

== Chart performance ==
Chart (2011)	Peak position
UK Dance (OCC)	9
UK Singles (OCC)	45

== Release history ==
Region	Date	Format	Label
Ireland	4 November 2011	Digital download	Polydor Records
United Kingdom	6 November 2011	Digital download	Polydor Records
