= Teddy Killerz =

Russian-Ukrainian electronic music group

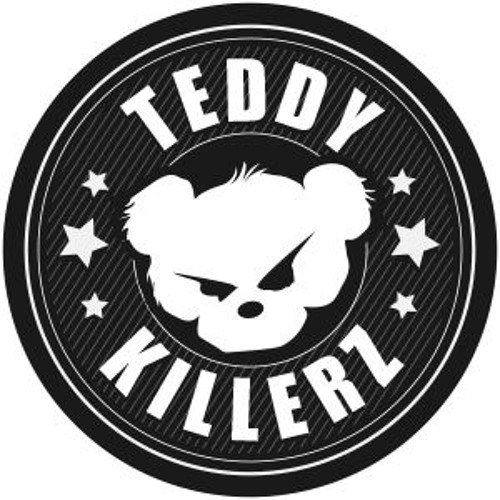
- Teddy Killerz's logo

Background information
- Also known as: Place2B & Paimon
- Origin: Russia; Ukraine
- Genres: Electronic, neurofunk, Jump-up, brostep, riddim, briddim, drum and bass
- Occupations: DJs, producers
- Years active: 2012–present
- Labels: RAM Records, Bad Taste Recordings, Owsla, Monstercat
- Members: Grigory Cherekaev; Anton Mashevsky; Oleg Cholovskii
- Website: soundcloud.com/teddykillerz www.ramrecords.com/artist/teddy-killerz

Teddy Killerz are a Russian-Ukrainian electronic music trio composed of Grigory Cherekaev, Anton Mashevsky and Oleg Cholovskyi. They also perform under their individual stage names as Garud, Place 2b, and Paimon (in respective order).

Teddy Killerz are known for producing various different styles of dance music ranging from drum and bass, dubstep, EDM trap and breakbeat. The group have released on Owsla and subsequently signed to RAM Records in November 2014, (only after an initial release on RAM Records’ sister label "Program"). Teddy Killerz's entry in a remix contest on Owsla for Skrillex’s song "Make It Bun Dem" caught the attention of the label owner, who subsequently signed the band. Their first release on Owsla was the Toys Riot extended play, consisting of three original songs. Teddy Killerz have also had a spate of releases on Bad Taste Recordings, Hardcore Beats and Dutty Audio. Teddy Killerz have remixed a number of other artists’ work, although most notably "Ragga Bomb" by Skrillex featuring the Ragga Twins, which was released in 2014 on Owsla, and "Make Those Move" by the group I Am Legion (consisting of hip hop artists Foreign Beggars and drum and bass artists Noisia) (released on Owsla, Par Excellence and Division Recordings), which remained at number 1 on the beatport chart for 6 weeks.

In 2014, Teddy Killerz were selected by RAM Records for the "60 minutes of RAM" mix for MistaJam on BBC 1 Xtra. They have also produced for and alongside dance/rock act Modestep which has sparked the song "Make You Mine" on their album London Road.

In 2015, Teddy Killerz's first release was "Teddynator" on 21 March on RAM Records and on 31 July 2015, also on RAM Records, their EP Hyperspeed came out.

They released their first album on 5 June 2017, titled Nightmare Street.

In 2020, they started the decade by releasing an EP on Insomniac's bass music record label Bassrush titled Nerd Starter Pack. In 2025, they released the album COOKED, continuing their string of international collaborations with features from P Money, Serum, and many other artists from the United Kingdom, as well as Billur Battal and Valfi from Turkey.

== Discography ==
=== Albums ===
Year	Release	Label
2017	Nightmare Street	RAM Records
2025	COOKED	Souped Up Records

=== Extended plays & Singles ===
Year	Release	Label
2012	Scary / Earth Shaker (with Nphonix)	Bad Taste
2012	New Drums / Double Thinking	Bad Taste
2012	The Exorcist EP	Hardcore Beats
2013	Violence EP	Eatbrain
2013	Toys Riot EP	Owsla
2013	Teddy Massacre EP	Owsla
2014	New Year Gifts 2013/2014	Not On Label
2014	Big Blow EP	Program
2014	Z / Shake	Bad Taste
2014	Machine Room Level One	Bad Taste
2014	Machine Room Level Two	Bad Taste
2014	Machine Room Level Three	Bad Taste
2014	Demolisher	Subtitles
2014	Blend LP Part 1 (with Optiv & BTK)	Dutty Audio
2015	Teddynator / Endlessly	RAM Records
2015	Hyperspeed EP	RAM Records
2016	Rock 'N' Roll / Wildlife (with June Miller)	RAM Records
2016	Killer Squad EP	RAM Records
2017	Teddy's Song	RAM Records
2017	Monkey Kingdom	RAM Records
2017	New Jam	RAM Records
2018	Back To Violence	Eatbrain
2018	Smooth (with Synergy)	Viper Recordings
2018	Hellblade EP	Eatbrain
2018	Uppercut (with Annix)	Playaz
2019	Miles High (with Gydra)	Neuropunk Records
2019	War On Silence (with Crissy Criss)	War On Silence
2019	Assassins	Blackout Music NL
2019	Vibe EP	Eatbrain
2020	Negative Thoughts EP	Eatbrain
2020	Panic Attack EP	Neuropunk Records
2020	Bun Dem EP (with Nais)	Copyright Control
2020	Nerd Starter Pack EP	Bassrush Records
2021	Elevate (with The Bloody Beetroots)	Monstercat
2021	Ghosts	Eatbrain
2021	Beast (with Kompany)	Monstercat
2021	Landing Capsule EP	RAM Records
2021	Slayer EP	Bassrush Records
2021	Dangerous Levels (with Protohype)	Underdog Records
2021	Destroyer	FiXT
2021	Assault	Copyright Control
2022	Night Train	Souped Up Records
2022	Clone (with Celldweller)	FiXT: Noir
2022	Critical Damage EP	Eatbrain Records
2022	My Life	DPMO Records
2022	Sticky	DPMO Records
2022	Redemption Plan EP	DPMO Records
2022	Blow The Socket (with Slushii and PAV4N)	Dim Mak Records
2022	INEEDU / SOYUZ	Monstercat Records
2023	Backup	Neuropunk Records
2023	Riders in the Sky	Monstercat Records
2023	Drop It Hard	Bassrush Records
2023	No Sleep EP	Bassrush Records
2023	Elephant's Language EP	Eatbrain Records
2023	Break My Heart	Souped Up Records
2023	Pump (with Pegboard Nerds)	Monstercat Records
2023	I'm Doing It	RAM Records
2023	Fight Me	Monstercat Records
2023	Get Up! (with Zardonic)	Sounds of Mayhem
2024	Run (with MC Spyda and Rouman)	Souped Up Records
2024	Johera	Monstercat Records
2024	Hear My Mind	Eatbrain Records
2024	Do U L Me	Roadblock Records
2024	Feeling Low	Monstercat Records
2024	Hardcore Riddim (with MC Spyda)	Monstercat Records
2024	Play Games EP	Eatbrain Records
2024	This is Blood (with The Bloody Beetroots & N8NOFACE)	Out Of Line Music
2024	Supa Sweet (with Armodine)	Souped Up Records
2024	NRG (with Inja)	Souped Up Records
2025	Skydiver	Souped Up Records
2025	Feed Your Soul	Souped Up Records
2025	We Love Drum & Bass (with Serum & P Money)	Souped Up Records
2025	Tonight (with Sweetie Irie)	Souped Up Records
2025	Fuse (with Khazali)	Souped Up Records
2025	Inhale (with Tony Wonka)	Souped Up Records
2025	Mom I Am Going To Rave (with Gydra & Rysick)	Souped Up Records
2025	Sadece (with Billur Battal & Valfi)	Souped Up Records
2025	Chemical Explosion / I Live	Souped Up Records
2025	Hybrid / Future	Souped Up Records
2026	Lightweight	Souped Up Records
2026	Could I Be / What U Done	Souped Up Records
