= Home Again (Michael Kiwanuka song) =

Single by Michael Kiwanuka

from the album Home Again
- Released: 1 January 2012
- Recorded: 2011
- Genre: Soul
- Length: 3:31
- Label: Polydor
- Songwriters: Jamie Scott; Michael Kiwanuka

Michael Kiwanuka singles chronology
"Home Again" (2012)	"I'm Getting Ready" (2012)

"Home Again" is a song by British soul musician Michael Kiwanuka, from his debut studio album Home Again. It was released as his debut single in the United Kingdom via digital download on 1 January 2012. On 8 January 2012, the song entered the UK Singles Chart at number 37, going on to 29 the following week.

== Music video ==
A music video to accompany the release of "Home Again" was first released onto YouTube on 18 November 2011.

== Track listing ==
UK digital download
No.	Title	Length
1.	"Home Again"	3:31
2.	"Now I'm Seeing"	2:33
3.	"They Say I'm Doing Just Fine"	3:40

== Charts ==
=== Weekly charts ===
Weekly chart performance for "Home Again"
Chart (2012)	Peak position
Belgium (Ultratop 50 Flanders)	3
Belgium (Ultratip Bubbling Under Wallonia)	11
France (SNEP)	21
Netherlands (Single Top 100)	59
UK Singles (Official Charts)	29
US Hot Singles Sales	3

2025 chart performance for "Home Again"
Chart (2025)	Peak position
Israel International Airplay (Media Forest)	16

=== Year-end charts ===
Annual chart performance for "Home Again"
Chart (2012)	Position
Belgium (Ultratop 50 Flanders)	57

== Certifications ==
Certifications for "Home Again"
Region	Certification	Certified units/sales
Norway (IFPI Norway)	Gold	30,000^{‡}
United Kingdom (BPI)	Silver	200,000^{‡}
^{‡} Sales+streaming figures based on certification alone.

== Release history ==
Release history for "Home Again"
Region	Date	Format	Label
United Kingdom	1 January 2012	Digital download	Polydor
