= Modestep =

English dubstep, drum & bass and electronic rock band

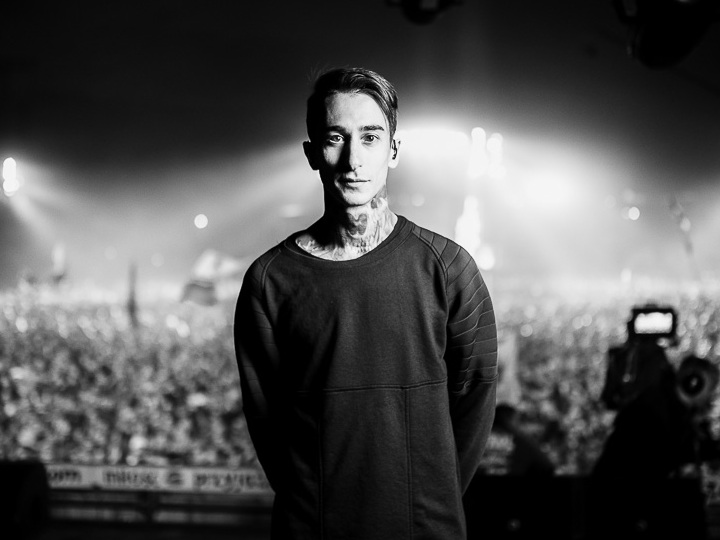
- Josh Friend of Modestep in 2015

Background information
- Origin: London, England, United Kingdom
- Genres: Electronic rock; dubstep; drum and bass; alternative rock; trap
- Years active: 2008–present
- Labels: Polydor; Interscope; Monstercat; Disciple; UKF; Never Say Die
- Members: Josh Friend
- Past members: Matthew Curtis; Pat Lundy; Nick Tsang; Kyle Deek; Tony Friend
- Website: www.modestep.com

Josh Friend, known by his stage name Modestep, is an English dubstep and electronic rock DJ and record producer from London. Modestep was originally a band founded in 2008, but with the band's most recent past member, Pat Lundy, leaving the band in 2022, Modestep became a solo act by Josh Friend. Their debut album Evolution Theory was released on 11 February 2013, including its five singles: "Feel Good", "Sunlight", "To The Stars", "Show Me a Sign" and "Another Day". Modestep's second album, London Road, was released on 25 May 2015, marking the band's first album featuring Lundy and Deek as members. Between 2017 and March 2019, the band released four singles on Canadian record label Monstercat and three EPs on Disciple Records.

== History ==
=== Early career (2010–2011) ===
Tony Friend had been DJing since 2001, while his brother, Josh, had been in multiple bands prior to Modestep with Matthew Curtis, only forming the band in 2010, along with guitarist Nick Tsang, a former member of Go:Audio.

Modestep was initially formed in 2008 by brothers Josh and Tony Friend. In the early days, prior to being or considering themselves to be a band, Tony and Josh held weekly online radio shows on Sundays: Modestep Radio - the church of dubstep. The show was also used to showcase new original tracks such as 'Exile' (given away for free to listeners of the show dated 20.06.10), 'Boogey Wonderland', 'Feel Good', 'To The Stars' and 'Sunlight'. 'Sunlight' ended up being remastered for release on their debut album Evolution Theory. 'Feel Good', 'To The Stars' also made it onto their debut album.

=== Evolution Theory (2011–2013) ===
Modestep began work on their debut album during early January 2011, with their debut single "Feel Good" being released in the United Kingdom on 6 February 2011; managing to reach the BBC Radio 1 A Playlist during the weeks prior to release. The single was released as part of a 3-track extended play, including another track entitled "Bite The Hand". On 13 February, the single debuted at number 38 on the UK Singles Chart, also reaching number 5 on the independent releases chart and number 6 on the dance releases chart. The music video of the new version of their single "Sunlight" was released on YouTube on 3 July, passing 1 million views within four days, also making the Radio 1 A-list and debuting at number 16 in the UK charts. "To The Stars" has also made it onto the Radio 1 A-list and was released on 6 November. Their fourth single "Show Me A Sign" made its YouTube debut on 19 March 2012 and was released on 6 May 2012.

=== Second studio album, departure of Tsang and Curtis and arrival of Deek and Lundy (2013–2017) ===
In December 2013, the band embarked on the Foot Locker tour in Europe, promoting popular shoe retail store Foot Locker. On 14 January 2014, Tsang and Curtis both left the band to pursue their own careers in the music industry. Despite this the album was still scheduled and a world tour is expected with the two new members, Pat Lundy (ex-drummer of the band Funeral For A Friend) and Kyle Deek (age 22) who joined in the spring of 2014. Starting in mid-2014, Josh and Tony began their recurring appearances in TheSyndicateProject's YouTube series, "Mianite", a series of videos based around the game Minecraft.

The band released a new single titled "Snake" for free download in mid-January 2015. On 22 February 2015, they announced the title and track listing for their second studio album, to be released on 25 May 2015. London Road, released through Modestep's own record label Max Records, it features collaborations with FuntCase, Teddy Killerz, Culprate, The Partysquad, Trolley Snatcha, Big Narstie, Flowdan, Frisco and more. On 14 May 2015, Modestep announced the release of one new song per day until the full album release.

=== Monstercat, Disciple, and the departure of Friend, Deek and Lundy (2017–present) ===
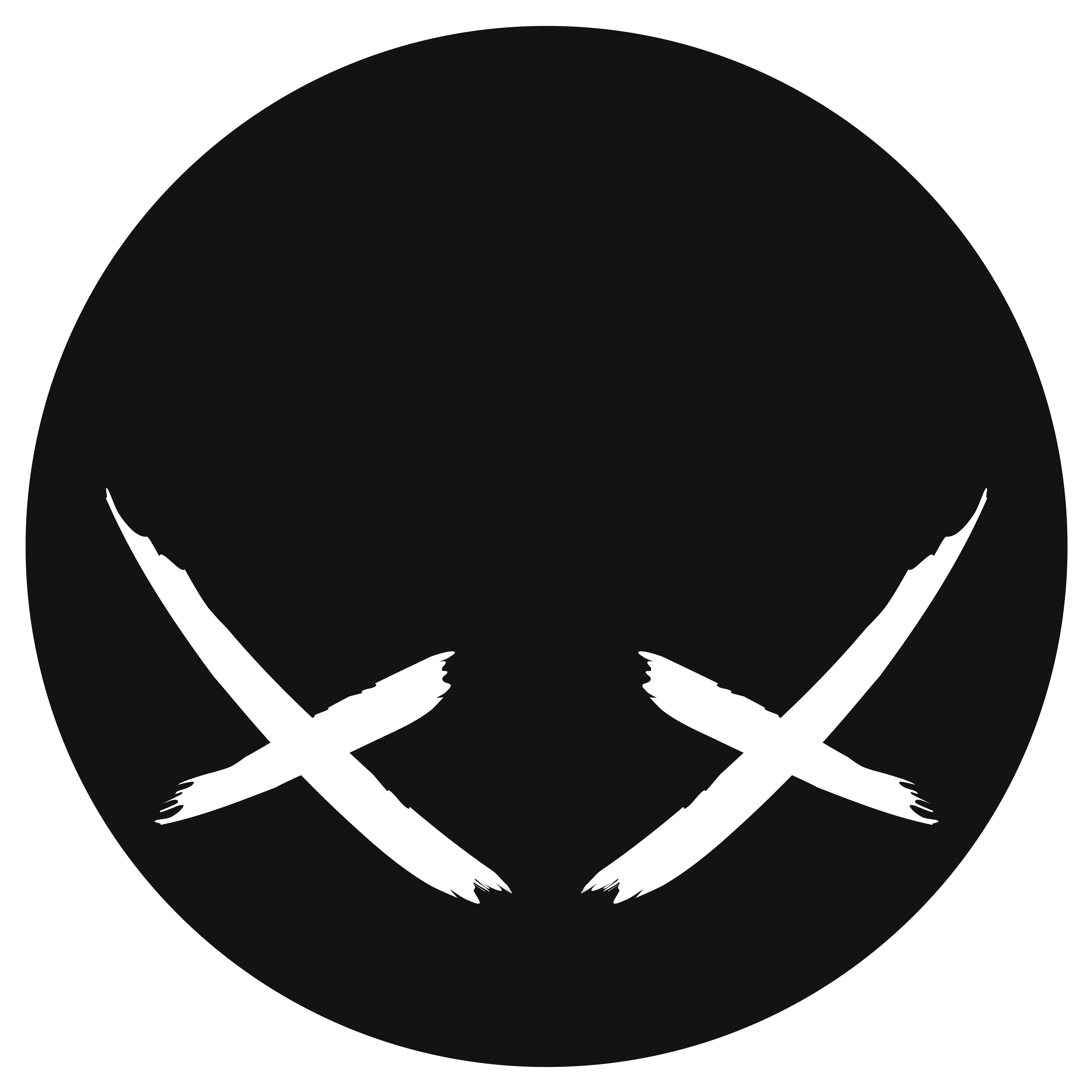
Modestep's Logo

After a brief hiatus, Modestep returned with "Living For The Weekend," a song that released on British record label Never Say Die Records.

Tony left the band in the summer of 2017. On 13 November, Canadian record label Monstercat released the duo's next single, "Higher". The duo then released two more singles on Monstercat: "Going Nowhere" (with Dion Timmer) and "Summer".

On 4 July 2018, British record label Disciple Records announces that Modestep has been signed to the label. The duo released "By My Side" alongside Virtual Riot and Barely Alive on Disciple's fourth compilation in the Disciple Alliance series.

Modestep came back to Monstercat to release "Not IRL" on 14 January 2019.

Modestep then released their debut Disciple EP entitled "Echoes" on 27 February 2019, which featured a collaboration with Virtual Riot entitled "Nothing". Modestep released their collab with Phaseone "Mayday" later that same year, which was featured on the latter's "Transcendency" LP. On the 17th of July, 2019, they released their second EP of the year entitled "Dawn", later releasing a collection of remixes for the EP entitled "The Remixes" featuring remixes from Riot Ten, Graphyt & Ecraze, Code:Pandorum, and Definitive. Later that year, they released a single with MVRDA entitled "Old School" on Disciple Recordings' "Alliance Vol 5" and also a solo single on Disciple Round Table's "Knights of the Round Table Vol 3" compilation entitled "Alarm".

In 2020, Modestep released a single on Disciple recordings' "Alliance Vol 6" entitled "Lost My Way."

In 2021, Modestep released a single on UKF Music entitled "Forever". Later that year, they released a collaborative single on Disciple Recordings with Virtual Riot and Frank Zummo entitled "This Could Be Us", which later was featured on Virtual Riot's "Simulation" LP. Modestep then released a single on Disciple Recordings' "Alliance Vol 7" compilation entitled "Solastalgia".

In 2022, Modestep released an EP on Disciple Recordings entitled "Diamonds", which featured collaborations with artists such as Automhate, Dr Ushuu, Jiqui, Nosphere and Oddprophet.

On 3 November 2022, Pat Lundy announced his departure from the band after 9 years via Twitter.

On 10 February 2023, Modestep announced on Twitter that they will be leaving Disciple's roster due to their new music route not aligning with Disciple's.

== Musical style and influences ==
Modestep have various musical styles and sounds as they have incorporated electronical elements such as dubstep and drum & bass, however they have also incorporated hard rock into their music. Josh Friend has also incorporated vocals into their music.

They have been placed next to bands such as Pendulum and The Prodigy due to their musical style, however they are able to play along with other artists such as The Script, Skrillex, Ed Sheeran and Flux Pavilion. In a 2012 interview with Soundsphere Magazine, the members explained that "We’re all massive ‘tech-head’ musicians...". It is explained how each member of the band influences their musical style with different genres of music, also explaining that their unique musical style was unintentional.

== Members ==
=== Current ===
- Josh Friend – lead vocals, keyboards, bass, production (2010–present)

=== Former ===
- Matthew Curtis – drums, percussion (2010–2014)
- Tony Friend – rhythm guitar, DJ (2010–2017)
- Nick Tsang – lead guitar (2010–2014)
- Kyle Deek – lead guitar (2014–2016)
- Pat Lundy – drums, percussion (2014–2022)

== Discography ==
- Evolution Theory (2013)
- London Road (2015)
- Give Up The Ghost (2025)
