= List of songs recorded by Keane =

This is a list of songs released and unreleased by English band Keane.

== Original songs ==
Title	Length	Type	Release	Tempo	TS	Genre	Earliest	Released
"11th Hour Blues"		song	unreleased					
"Again and Again"	3:50	song from	Perfect Symmetry	139 bpm	4/4 on 16	Piano rock	2007	2008
"All I Was"		song	unreleased					
"Allemande"	4:22	B-side to	"This Is the Last Time"	120 bpm	3/4 on 12	Acoustic ballad	1999	2003
"Atlantic"	4:13	single off	Under the Iron Sea	65 bpm	4/4 on 8	Post-rock	2005	2006
"Back in Time"	3:52	song from	Night Train				2010	2010
"A Bad Dream"	5:06	single off	Under the Iron Sea	72 bpm	4/4 on 16	Power ballad	2005	2006
"Bedshaped"	4:38	single off	Hopes and Fears	76 bpm	4/4 on 8	Power ballad	2001	2003
"Bend and Break"	3:40	single off	Hopes and Fears	134 bpm	4/4 on 16	Piano rock	2001	2004
"Better Than This"	4:03	single off	Perfect Symmetry	142 bpm	4/4 on 16	Pop	2007	2008
"Black Burning Heart"	5:23	song from	Perfect Symmetry	133 bpm	4/4 on 8	Piano rock	2007	2008
"Black Rain"	3:46	song from	Strangeland	130 bpm	4/4 on 16	Alternative		2012
"The Boys"	3:33	song from	Strangeland (Deluxe Edition)					2012
"Broken Toy"	6:07	song from	Under the Iron Sea	61 bpm	9/8 on 6	Rock jazz	2005	2006
"Burning the Days"	4:07	song from	Dirt -EP			Alternative		2021
"Call Me What You Like"	5:21	A-side to	"Call Me What You Like"	78 bpm	4/4 on 8	Alternative	1999	2000
"Can't Stop Now"	3:38	song from	Hopes and Fears	120 bpm	4/4 on 8	Piano rock	2001	2003
"Captain Planet"		song	unreleased					
"Chase the Night Away"	4:03	song from	Cause and Effect					2019
"Clear Skies"	4:53	song from	Night Train	130 bpm	4/4 on 16	Alternative	2010	2010
"Closer Now"	4:57	B-side to	"Call Me What You Like"	78 bpm	4/4 on 8	Alternative	1999	2000
"Crystal Ball"	3:53	single off	Under the Iron Sea	124 bpm	4/4 on 8	Piano rock	2005	2006
"Day Will Come"	3:11	song from	Strangeland	150 bpm	4/4 on 16	Piano rock	2005	2012
"Difficult Child"	3:44	B-side to	"Sovereign Light Café"					2012
"Difficult Year"	3:28	song from	Cause and Effect (Deluxe Edition)					2019
"Disconnected"	3:57	single off	Strangeland	88 bpm	4/4 on 16	Piano rock	2010	2012
"Dirt"	4:07	song from	Dirt -EP			Alternative		2021
"Emily"	3:40	song	unreleased	140 bpm	4/4 on 16	Alternative	1999	
"Everybody's Changing"	3:35	single off	Hopes and Fears	92 bpm	4/4 on 16	Piano rock	2001	2003
"Fly to Me"	5:32	B-side to	"Everybody's Changing"	120 bpm	4/4 on 8	Piano rock	2003	2004
"The Frog Prince"	4:22	song from	Under the Iron Sea	112 bpm	4/4 on 16	Piano rock	2005	2006
"Glass Bottles"	3:48	demo from	Retroactive EP2			Piano rock	2011	2019
"Hamburg Song"	4:37	song from	Under the Iron Sea	60 bpm	4/4 on 8	Acoustic ballad	2005	2006
"The Happy Soldier"	7:45	song from	Retrospective EP2	106 bpm	4/4 on 16	Post-rock	2000	2010
"He Used to Be a Lovely Boy"	3:38	B-side to	"Is It Any Wonder?"	69 bpm	4/4 on 8	Acoustic ballad	2006	2006
"A Heart to Hold You"	3:43	song from	Hopes and Fears (Special Edition)	70 bpm	4/4 on 8	Acoustic ballad	2004	2009
"High Time"		song	unreleased					
"Higher Than the Sun"	3:21	single off	The Best of Keane				2013	2013
"House Lights"	1:23	instrumental from	Night Train				2010	2010
"I Need Your Love"	4:11	song from	Cause and Effect					2019
"I'll Live in Fear"		song	unreleased					
"I'm Not Leaving"	4:14	song from	Cause and Effect	63 bpm	4/4 on 32	Pop	2019	2019
"In Your Own Time"	3:43	song from	Strangeland					2012
"Innes' Song"		song	unreleased					
"Into the Light"	3:18	demo from	Retrospective EP1	120 bpm	4/4 on 8	Electronic	2003	2008
"The Iron Sea"	2:57	instrumental from	Under the Iron Sea	90 bpm	4/4 on 32	Post-rock	2005	2006
"Is It Any Wonder?"	3:06	single off	Under the Iron Sea	129 bpm	4/4 on 8	Alternative	2005	2006
"It's Not True"	3:51	song from	Strangeland (Deluxe Edition)			Piano rock		2012
"Gingerbread"		song	unreleased			Alternative	1996	
"Leaving So Soon?"	3:59	song from	Under the Iron Sea	144 bpm	4/4 on 16	Piano rock	2005	2006
"Less in More"		song	unreleased					
"Let It Slide"	4:11	B-side to	"Is It Any Wonder?"	130 bpm	4/4 on 32	Piano rock	2005	2006
"Looking Back"	3:46	song from	Night Train				2010	2010
"Love Actually"	4:30	single off	Hopes and Fears 20	116 bpm	12/8	Ballad	2023	2024
"Love Is the End"	5:37	song from	Perfect Symmetry	109 bpm	3/4 on 6	Power ballad	2008	2008
"Love Too Much"	3:09	single off	Cause and Effect					2019
"The Lovers Are Losing"	5:04	single off	Perfect Symmetry	117 bpm	4/4 on 32	Piano rock	2007	2008
"Maps"	4:05	demo from	Retrospective EP2	83 bpm	4/4 on 8	Alternative	1999	2010
"Maybe I Can Change"	3:57	B-side to	"Crystal Ball"	70 bpm	4/4 on 16	Piano pop	2005	2006
"Melodrama"		song	unreleased					
"More Matey"	3:27	song	unreleased	75 bpm	4/4 on 8	Acoustic ballad	1996	
"Morsel"		song	unreleased	101 bpm		Alternative	1999	
"Mr. Caravan"		song	unreleased				1996	
"My Shadow"	4:49	song from	Night Train	98 bpm	4/4 on 16	Piano rock	2008	2010
"Myth"	4:55	B-side to	"Silenced by the Night"				2012	2012
"Nagasaki Summer"		song	unreleased				1996	
"Neon River"	4:52	song from	Strangeland					2012
"New Golden Age"	3:44	song from	Cause and Effect (Deluxe Edition)					2019
"New One"	4:27	song	unreleased	157 bpm	6/8 on 6	Alternative	2000	
"The Night Sky"	5:05	A-side to	"The Night Sky"	72 bpm	4/4 on 16	Power ballad	2007	2007
"Nothing in My Way"	4:00	single off	Under the Iron Sea	86 bpm	4/4 on 16	Piano rock	2005	2006
"Nothing to Something"	3:33	song from	Dirt -EP			Alternative		2021
"November Day"	3:39	song from	Dirt -EP			Alternative		2021
"On a Day Like Today"	5:27	song from	Hopes and Fears	72 bpm	4/4 on 8	Power ballad	2004	2004
"On the Road"	3:56	song from	Strangeland	157 bpm	4/4 on 16	Piano rock		2012
"Perfect Symmetry"	5:12	single off	Perfect Symmetry	115 bpm	4/4 on 8	Piano rock	2007	2008
"Phases"	3:36	song from	Cause and Effect					2019
"Playing Along"	5:35	song from	Perfect Symmetry	122 bpm		Alternative	2007	2008
"Pot of Gold"	3:41	song	unreleased	106 bpm	4/4 on 8	Rock	1999	
"Pretend That You're Alone"	3:47	song from	Perfect Symmetry	117 bpm	4/4 on 16	Piano pop	2007	2008
"Put It Behind You"	3:36	song from	Under the Iron Sea	140 bpm	4/4 on 16	Piano rock	2005	2006
"Put the Radio On"	4:11	song from	Cause and Effect					2019
"Rubbernecking"	5:58	B-side to	"Call Me What You Like"	65 bpm	4/4 on 8	Post-rock	1999	2000
"Run with Me"	3:30	song from	Strangeland (Deluxe Edition)				2011	2012
"Russian Farmer's Song"	6:34	song from	The Best of Keane					2013
"Sea Fog"	3:27	song from	Strangeland	72 bpm	4/4 on 8	Ballad		2012
"She Has No Time"	5:45	song from	Hopes and Fears	72 bpm	4/4 on 8	Power ballad	1999	2000
"She Opens Her Eyes"	4:25	B-side to	"This Is the Last Time"	112 bpm	3/4 on 6	Acoustic ballad	2004	2004
"The Silence of an Alien"		song	unreleased				1991	
"Silenced by the Night"	3:16	single off	Strangeland	112 bpm	4/4 on 16	Piano rock		2012
"Snowed Under"	3:50	B-side to	"Somewhere Only We Know"	128 bpm	4/4 on 8	Piano rock	2003	2004
"Something in Me Was Dying"	4:46	B-side to	"Bedshaped"	106 bpm	4/4 on 16	Piano pop	2004	2004
"Somewhere Only We Know"	3:57	single off	Hopes and Fears	87 bpm	4/4 on 16	Piano rock	2001	2004
"Sovereign Light Café"	3:38	single off	Strangeland	126 bpm	4/4 on 16	Piano rock	2009	2012
"Spiralling"	4:19	single off	Perfect Symmetry	112 bpm	4/4 on 16	Piano pop	2007	2008
"Staring at the Ceiling"	3:52	B-side to	"Perfect Symmetry"	136 bpm	4/4 on 16	Piano rock	2008	2008
"Start the Car"		song	unreleased					
"The Starting Line"	4:12	song from	Strangeland	75 bpm	4/4 on 8	Piano rock		2012
"Stop for a Minute"	4:06	single off	Night Train	87 bpm	4/4 on 8	Pop	2010	2010
"Strange Room"	4:23	song from	Cause and Effect					2019
"Strangeland"	4:36	song from	Strangeland (Deluxe Edition)					2012
"Stupid Things"	3:49	song from	Cause and Effect					2019
"Sunshine"	4:12	song from	Hopes and Fears	100 bpm	4/4 on 8	Alternative	2001	2004
"Tear Up This Town"	3:12	A-side to	"Tear Up This Town"	142 bpm		Piano pop	2016	2016
"Thin Air"	3:58	B-side to	"Nothing in My Way"	122 bpm	4/4 on 8	Piano pop	2004	2006
"This Is the Last Time"	3:29	single off	Hopes and Fears	132 bpm	4/4 on 8	Piano rock	2001	2003
"Thread"	4:52	song from	Cause and Effect					2019
"Time to Go"	3:50	B-side to	"The Lovers Are Losing"	128 bpm		Alternative	2006	2008
"To the End of the Earth"	3:02	B-side to	"Everybody's Changing"	120 bpm	4/4 on 8	Piano rock	2000	2004
"Try Again"	4:27	single off	Under the Iron Sea	72 bpm	4/4 on 16	Power ballad	2005	2006
"Tyderian"	4:37	B-side to	"Nothing in My Way"	120 bpm	4/4 on 64	Post-rock	2006	2006
"Untitled 1"	5:36	song from	Hopes and Fears	104 bpm	4/4 on 32	Post-rock	2003	2004
"Untitled 2"	3:01	B-side to	"Bedshaped"	120 bpm	3/4 on 6	Ballad	2003	2004
"Walnut Tree"	3:41	B-side to	"Somewhere Only We Know"	110 bpm	4/4 on 32	Alternative	2001	2004
"Watch How You Go"	3:40	song from	Strangeland	74 bpm	4/4 on 8	Ballad		2012
"The Way I Feel"	4:06	single off	Cause and Effect					2019
"The Way You Want It"	3:19	B-side to	"Everybody's Changing"	120 bpm	4/4 on 8	Acoustic ballad	2003	2003
"We Might as Well Be Strangers"	3:12	single off	Hopes and Fears	72 bpm	4/4 on 16	Power ballad	2003	2004
"Wolf at the Door"	4:17	A-side to	"Wolf at the Door"	68 bpm	6/8 on 6	Alternative	2000	2001
"Won't Be Broken"	3:42	single off	The Best of Keane					2013
"Wonderful River"		song	unreleased					
"You Are Young"	3:35	song from	Strangeland	100 bpm	4/4 on 8	Piano rock		2012
"You Don't See Me"	4:03	song from	Perfect Symmetry	83 bpm	4/4 on 32	Power ballad	2007	2008
"You Haven't Told Me Anything"	3:47	song from	Perfect Symmetry	152 bpm	4/4 on 16	Piano pop	2007	2008
"You're Not Home"	5:31	song from	Cause and Effect					2019
"Your Eyes Open"	3:23	song from	Hopes and Fears	132 bpm	4/4 on 8	Piano rock	2001	2004
"Your Love"	4:36	song from	Night Train				2010	2010

== Cover songs ==
Title	Original performer	Genre	Performed	Performed for	Released	Released on
"American Tune"	Paul Simon					
"Dinner at Eight"	Rufus Wainwright					Connect Set
"Dirtylicious"	Christina Aguilera/Destiny's Child		30 October 2006	BBC Radio 1 Live Lounge		
"Disco 2000"	Pulp		26 November 2008	BBC Radio 2 Live	3 June 2009	
"Enjoy the Silence"	Depeche Mode				22 January 2007	"A Bad Dream"
"Golden Slumbers"	The Beatles					
"Paperback Writer"	The Beatles					
"Praise You"	Fatboy Slim					
"She Sells Sanctuary"	The Cult				22 January 2007	"A Bad Dream"
"That's All"	Genesis			VH1 Rock Honours 2007		
"The River"	Bruce Springsteen					
"The Sun Ain't Gonna Shine Anymore"	Frankie Valli				20 April 2005	"The Sun Ain't Gonna Shine Anymore"
"Under Pressure"	Queen feat. David Bowie				29 October 2007	"The Night Sky"
"What a Wonderful World"	Louis Armstrong					
"White Christmas"	Irving Berlin					
"With or Without You"	U2			BBC Radio 1 Live Lounge	9 November 2009	Hopes and Fears Special Edition
"Your Song"	Elton John					
"Ishin Denshin (You've Got to Help Yourself)"	Yellow Magic Orchestra				10 May 2010	Night Train EP
"You've Got to Hide Your Love Away"	The Beatles					

- "Do They Know It's Christmas?" (Band Aid 20, Chaplin and Rice-Oxley's contribution)
- "Early Winter" (co-written for Gwen Stefani)
- "Goodbye Yellow Brick Road" (Elton John, included on Help: a Day in the Life)
- "Go Your Own Way" (Fleetwood Mac, Live on BBC Radio 2, May 2010)
- "Karma Chameleon" (Culture Club, live April 2009 + Pete Doherty)
- "Cast No Shadow" (Oasis, V Festival 2009)
- "The Downtown Lights" (The Blue Nile, MSN Music Something Sessions, 2012)

== Featured songs on massive media ==
Title	Featured on	Type of media	Broadcasting company
"A Bad Dream"	Season 4 Première (The O.C.)	TV series	FOX
"A Bad Dream"	"My Long Goodbye" (Scrubs 6x15)	TV series	NBC
"A Bad Dream"	"The Finale Chapter" (Making the Band 4 3x20)	TV series	NBC
"Somewhere Only We Know"	He's Just Not That Into You	Film	
"Somewhere Only We Know"	Glee	TV series	FOX
"Somewhere Only We Know"	Winnie the Pooh	Film	
"Somewhere Only We Know"	Grey's Anatomy	TV series	ABC
"My Shadow"	Grey's Anatomy	TV series	ABC
"My Shadow"	"Keep It Real" (CSI: NY 8x02)	TV series	CBS

== Covers of Keane songs by other artists ==
- "Bedshaped" - Marillion, Vittorio Grigolo (as "Cosi")
- "Closer Now" (as "Pattern of My Life") - Annie Lennox
- "Everybody's Changing" - Lily Allen, Taio Cruz, Martin Stenmarck, Katy Perry, FunFiction, Kate Miller
- "Somewhere Only We Know" - Natasha Bedingfield, Max Schneider with Elizabeth Gilles, Elsa Roses, Stacey Solomon, Saint Patrick's Junior Choir, Luke Friend, Luis Sequira, Michael Paynter, Laura Michelle Kelly, Lifehouse, Travis (as "After Mark and Lard Go"), Lily Allen, Renee Dominique, Kacey Musgraves, Glee, Sam Clark, Jordan JAE, Saint Ronan's, Reese Lansangan, Karina Maisha, Post Modern Jukebox, Yaval Salomon, Kacey Musgraves live w/ Tom Chaplin, SimplyThree, Collabro, Those Guys A cappella
- "Spiralling" - Sugababes, Hayley Kiyoko
- "Bend and Break" - Maddy and Girls, Maddy Prior, Abby Lathe, Claudia Gibson, Noah
- "Better Than This" - VIDAR
- "This Is the Last Time" - ortoPilot, SIDEPONY, Tessa Looijen
- "You Are Young" - Madyon
- "We Might as Well Be Strangers" - Marcos French
- "Is It Any Wonder?" - Passenger, Fritts
