= Keane discography =

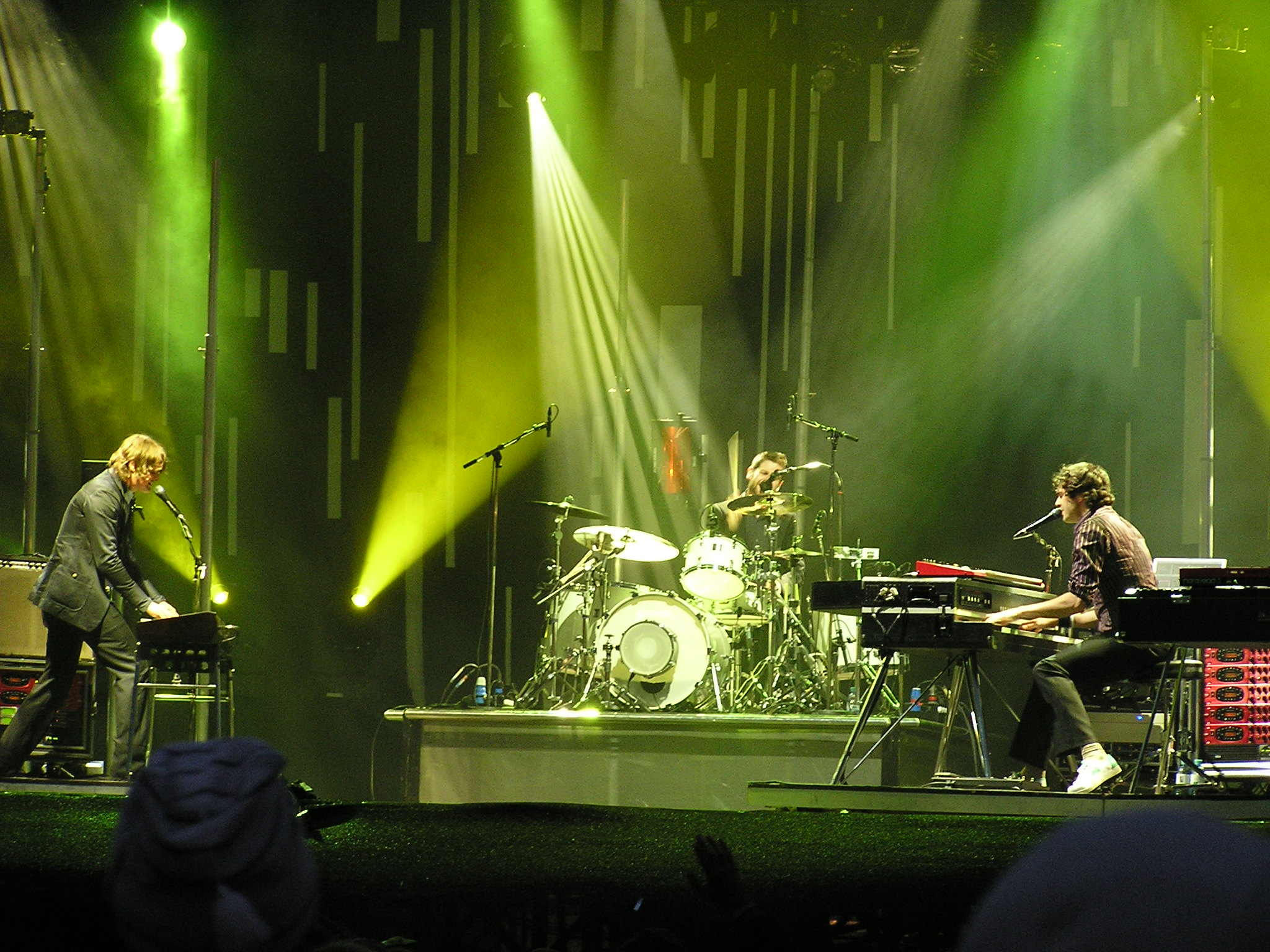
- Keane performing at Rock im Park in 2006
- Studio albums: 5
- Extended plays: 10
- Live albums: 4
- Singles: 32
- Video albums: 3

English alternative rock band Keane have released five studio albums, four live albums, 10 extended plays and 32 singles.

== Albums ==
=== Studio albums ===
Title	Details	Peak chart positions										Sales	Certifications (sales thresholds)
Title	Details	UK	BEL	FRA	GER	IRL	NLD	NOR	POR	SWI	US	Sales	Certifications (sales thresholds)
Hopes and Fears	Released: 10 May 2004; Label: Island (#CID 8145); Formats: CD, digital download	1	5	5	30	3	3	2	1	22	45	UK: 2,833,752; World: 6,000,000	BPI: 10× Platinum; AFP: 2× Platinum; BRMA: Platinum; BVMI: Gold; IFPI NOR: 2× Platinum; IFPI SWI: Platinum; IRMA: 5× Platinum; NVPI: Platinum; RIAA: Platinum; SNEP: Platinum
Under the Iron Sea	Released: 12 June 2006; Label: Island (#CID 8167); Formats: LP, CD, digital download	1	3	8	3	1	1	3	3	2	4	UK: 904,798; World: 3,000,000	BPI: 3× Platinum; AFP: Gold; BVMI: Gold; IFPI SWI: Gold; IRMA: Platinum; NVPI: Gold; RIAA: Gold
Perfect Symmetry	Released: 13 October 2008; Label: Island (#1784417); Formats: LP, CD, digital download	1	7	42	10	4	3	7	5	6	7	US: 135,000	BPI: Platinum; IRMA: Gold
Strangeland	Released: 4 May 2012; Label: Island; Formats: LP, CD, digital download	1	4	11	5	1	1	4	5	3	17	UK: 206,972	BPI: Gold
Cause and Effect	Released: 20 September 2019; Label: Island; Formats: LP, CD, digital download	2	15	61	16	12	11	—	8	18	— (Note: Cause and Effect did not enter the US Billboard 200, but peaked at number 18 on the US Album Sales Chart.)		BPI: Silver

=== Live albums ===
Title	Details
Live 06	Released: 17 October 2006; Label: ConcertLive; Format: CD
Live Recordings: European Tour 2008	Released: 15 December 2008; Label: Island; Format: Digital download
iTunes - Live From London	Released: 26 April 2010; Label: Universal Music Division AZ; Format: Digital download
Live At Largo (Los Angeles)	Released: 2 April 2021; Label: Island; Format: Digital download

=== Compilation albums ===
Title	Details	Peak chart positions									Certifications (sales thresholds)
Title	Details	UK	BEL	FRA	GER	IRL	NLD	POR	SCO	SWI	Certifications (sales thresholds)
The Best of Keane	Released: 11 November 2013; Label: Island; Format: CD, digital download	10	10	86	49	21	13	17	9	66	BPI: Platinum

== Extended plays ==
Title	Details	Peak chart positions									Certifications
Title	Details	UK	BEL	FRA	GER	IRL	NLD	SWE	SWI	US	Certifications
Live Recordings 2004	Released: 3 May 2005; Label: Island (#9870873); Formats: CD, digital download	131	—	—	—	—	—	—	—	—	
Retrospective EP 1: Everybody's Changing	Released: 5 December 2008; Label: Island; Formats: Digital download	—	—	—	—	—	—	—	—	—	
The Cherrytree Sessions	Released: 5 May 2009; Label: Interscope (#001290032); Formats: CD, digital download	—	—	—	—	—	—	—	—	—	
Night Train	Released: 10 May 2010; Label: Island; Formats: CD, digital download	1	12	45	65	15	9	42	23	25	BPI: Silver
Retrospective EP 2: Sunshine	Released: 28 June 2010; Label: Island; Formats: Digital download	—	—	—	—	—	—	—	—	—	
iTunes Festival: London 2010	Released: 2 August 2010; Label: Island; Formats: Digital download	—	—	—	—	—	—	—	—	—	
Amazon Artist Lounge: Keane Live from London	Released: 25 October 2013; Label: Island; Formats: Digital download	—	—	82	—	—	—	—	—	—	
Retroactive – EP1	Released: 17 May 2019; Label: Island; Formats: Digital download	—	—	—	—	—	—	—	—	—	
Retroactive – EP2	Released: 29 November 2019; Label: Island; Formats: Digital download	—	—	—	—	—	—	—	—	—	
Live in Asunción	Released: 24 December 2020; Label: Island; Formats: Digital download	—	—	—	—	—	—	—	—	—	
Dirt	Released: 17 July 2021; Label: Island; Formats: 12-inch vinyl	—	—	—	—	—	—	—	—	—	
"—" denotes releases that did not chart or was not released.

== Singles ==
Song	Year	Peak chart positions										Certifications	Album
Song	Year	UK	BEL	FRA	GER	IRL	ITA	NLD	NOR	SWI	US	Certifications	Album
"Call Me What You Like"	2000	—	—	—	—	—	—	—	—	—	—		Non-album singles
"Wolf at the Door"	2001	—	—	—	—	—	—	—	—	—	—		Non-album singles
"Everybody's Changing"	2003	4	20	10	60	27	2	20	18	24	—	BPI: Platinum; FIMI: Platinum	Hopes and Fears
"This Is the Last Time"	2003	18	52	56	84	43	37	43	—	— (Note: "This Is the Last Time" did not enter the Swiss Singles chart, but charted at number two on the Swiss Airplay chart.)	—	BPI: Silver	Hopes and Fears
"Somewhere Only We Know"	2004	3	43	42	55	30	44	15	—	—	50	BPI: 4× Platinum; BRMA: Gold; BVMI: Platinum; FIMI: 2× Platinum; RIAA: 2× Platinum	Hopes and Fears
"Bedshaped"	2004	10	52	—	61	38	—	13	—	—	—	BPI: Silver	Hopes and Fears
"Bend and Break"	2005	—	— (Note: "Bend and Break" did not enter the Flemish Ultratop chart, but peaked at number 19 on the Ultratop Back Catalogue Singles chart.)	—	95	—	—	—	—	— (Note: "Bend and Break" did not enter the Swiss Singles chart, but charted at number 14 on the Swiss Airplay chart.)	—		Hopes and Fears
"Atlantic" (Note: Limited to 1,000 copies (all vinyl); UK only)	2006	—	—	—	—	—	—	—	—	—	—		Under the Iron Sea
"Is It Any Wonder?"	2006	3	38	72	61	18	13	17	12	28	78	BPI: Silver	Under the Iron Sea
"Crystal Ball"	2006	20	38	60	64	41	37	36	—	— (Note: "Crystal Ball" did not enter the Swiss Singles chart, but charted at number 18 on the Swiss Airplay chart.)	—		Under the Iron Sea
"Nothing in My Way"	2006	19	2	—	—	—	—	56	—	—	—		Under the Iron Sea
"A Bad Dream"	2007	23	—	—	—	—	—	77	—	—	—		Under the Iron Sea
"Try Again"	2007	—	—	—	39	—	—	—	—	83	—		Under the Iron Sea
"Spiralling"	2008	23	41	—	83	22	—	29	—	—	—	BPI: Silver	Perfect Symmetry
"The Lovers Are Losing"	2008	52	50	49	—	—	—	84	19	— (Note: "The Lovers Are Losing" did not enter the Swiss Singles chart, but charted at number 15 on the Swiss Airplay chart.)	—		Perfect Symmetry
"Perfect Symmetry"	2008	150	70	—	—	—	—	—	—	— (Note: "Perfect Symmetry" did not enter the Swiss Singles chart, but charted at number 41 on the Swiss Airplay chart.)	— (Note: "Perfect Symmetry" did not enter the Billboard Hot 100, but peaked at number 24 on the Hot Singles Sales chart.)		Perfect Symmetry
"Better Than This"	2009	173	—	—	—	—	—	—	—	—	—		Perfect Symmetry
"Stop for a Minute" (featuring K'naan)	2010	40	14	—	—	27	22	35	—	— (Note: "Stop for a Minute" did not enter the Swiss Singles chart, but charted at number 90 on the Swiss Airplay chart.)	—		Night Train
"Silenced by the Night"	2012	46	14	146	—	58	86	50	—	—	—		Strangeland
"Disconnected"	2012	— (Note: "Disconnected" did not enter the UK Singles Chart, but peaked at number 11 on the UK Physical Singles Chart Top 100.)	60	—	—	—	—	—	—	— (Note: "Disconnected" did not enter the Swiss Singles chart, but charted at number 75 on the Swiss Airplay chart.)	—		Strangeland
"Sovereign Light Café"	2012	74	52	—	—	—	—	71	—	—	—	BPI: Silver	Strangeland
"Higher Than the Sun"	2013	188	55	—	—	—	—	—	—	— (Note: "Higher Than the Sun" did not enter the Swiss Singles chart, but charted at number 100 on the Swiss Airplay chart.)	—		The Best of Keane
"Won't Be Broken"	2014	—	75	—	—	—	—	—	—	—	—		The Best of Keane
"Tear Up This Town"	2016	— (Note: "Tear Up This Town" did not enter the UK Singles Chart, but peaked at number 19 on the UK Physical Singles Chart Top 100.)	—	—	—	—	—	—	—	—	—		Non-album singles
"The Night Sky" (re-release)	2017	—	—	—	—	—	—	—	—	—	—		Non-album singles
"The Way I Feel"	2019	— (Note: "The Way I Feel" did not enter the UK Singles Chart, but peaked at number 57 on the UK Singles Downloads Chart Top 100.)	—	—	—	—	—	—	—	—	—		Cause and Effect
"Love Too Much"	2019	— (Note: "Love Too Much" did not enter the UK Singles Chart, but peaked at number 40 on the UK Singles Downloads Chart Top 100.)	—	—	—	—	—	—	—	—	—		Cause and Effect
"Stupid Things"	2019	—	—	—	—	—	—	—	—	—	—		Cause and Effect
"I'm Not Leaving"	2020	—	—	—	—	—	—	—	—	—	—		Cause and Effect
"Phases"	2020	—	—	—	—	—	—	—	—	—	—		Cause and Effect
"Dirt"	2021	— (Note: "Dirt" did not enter the UK Singles Chart, but peaked at number 10 on the UK Physical Singles Chart Top 100.)	—	—	—	—	—	—	—	—	—		Dirt EP
"Love Actually"	2023	—	—	—	—	—	—	—	—	—	—		Non-album single
"—" denotes releases that did not chart or was not released.

== Other charted songs ==
Song	Year	Peak chart positions				Album
Song	Year	UK	BEL	NLD	US	Album
"We Might as Well Be Strangers" (DJ Shadow remix) (DJ Shadow vs. Keane)	2005	—	—	—	— (Note: "We Might as Well Be Strangers" (DJ Shadow remix) did not enter the Billboard Hot 100, but peaked at number 27 on the Hot Singles Sales chart.)	Hopes and Fears (Deluxe Edition)
"Let It Slide"	2006	116	—	—	—	"Is It Any Wonder?" single
"He Used to Be a Lovely Boy"	2006	176	—	—	—	"Is It Any Wonder?" single
"Looking Back" (featuring K'naan)	2010	—	55	—	—	Night Train
"You Are Young"	2012	— (Note: "You Are Young" did not enter the UK Singles Chart, but peaked at number 55 on the UK Singles Sales Chart.)	—	—	—	Strangeland
"Sovereign Light Café" (Afrojack Remix) (Afrojack vs. Keane)	2013	—	—	29	—	Forget the World
"Bend and Break" (Basto Remix) (Basto vs. Keane)	2013	—	59	—	—	—N/a

== Video albums ==
Title	Video details	Notes	Certifications
Strangers	Released: 14 November 2005; Label: Island; Format: DVD	2 DVD set featuring a 1-hour behind the scenes film of the band on tour, 16 live performances, 2 photo galleries, 6 promo videos, 2 'making of' videos, various concert visuals.	BPI: Gold
Keane Live	Released: 17 December 2007; Label: Island; Format: DVD, Blu-ray	Live performance from the O2 Arena in London.	

== Music videos ==
Year	Title	Album	Director
2003	"Everybody's Changing"	Hopes and Fears	—
2003	"Everybody's Changing" (Alternative Version)	Hopes and Fears	—
2003	"This Is the Last Time"	Hopes and Fears	—
2004	"Somewhere Only We Know"	Hopes and Fears	—
2004	"Somewhere Only We Know" (Alternative Version)	Hopes and Fears	—
2004	"She Has No Time"	Hopes and Fears	—
2004	"Bedshaped"	Hopes and Fears	—
2004	"Snowed Under"	Hopes and Fears	—
2005	"Bend and Break" (Live)	Hopes and Fears	—
2006	"Atlantic"	Under the Iron Sea	Irvine Welsh
2006	"Is It Any Wonder?"	Under the Iron Sea	Kevin Godley
2006	"Crystal Ball"	Under the Iron Sea	Giuseppe Capotondi
2006	"Crystal Ball" (Band Version)	Under the Iron Sea	Giuseppe Capotondi
2006	"Nothing in My Way"	Under the Iron Sea	Dick Carruthers
2006	"Nothing in My Way" (US version)	Under the Iron Sea	Giuseppe Capotondi
2007	"A Bad Dream"	Under the Iron Sea	—
2008	"Spiralling"	Perfect Symmetry	—
2008	"The Lovers Are Losing"	Perfect Symmetry	—
2008	"Perfect Symmetry"	Perfect Symmetry	—
2010	"Stop for a Minute"	Night Train	—
2012	"Silenced By the Night"	Strangeland	Christopher Sims
2012	"Disconnected"	Strangeland	Juan Antonio Bayona and Sergio G. Sánchez
2012	"Sovereign Light Café"	Strangeland	Lindy Heymann
2013	"Higher Than the Sun"	The Best of Keane	Chris Boyle
2016	"Tear Up This Town"	—N/a	Juan Antonio Bayona
2019	"The Way I Feel"	Cause and Effect	Kevin Godley
2019	"Love Too Much"	Cause and Effect	Lochlainn 'Locky' McKenna
2020	"I'm Not Leaving"	Cause and Effect	—
2020	"Bridge Over Troubled Water"	—N/a	—
2021	"Dirt"	Dirt EP	Yasmeer Fanari

== Songs in other media ==
Year	Title	Type	Song
2004	Call Register	Short film	"Snowed Under"
2004	The O.C.	TV series episode: "The Way We Were"	"Walnut Tree"
2004	One Tree Hill	TV series episode: "Truth Doesn't Make a Noise"	"Everybody's Changing"
2004	Raise Your Voice	Film	"We Might as Well Be Strangers"
2004	Smallville	TV series episode: "Spell"	"We Might as Well Be Strangers"
2004	Victoria's Secret	TV ad	"Somewhere Only We Know"
2004	Sky Movies	TV ad	"Bedshaped"
2005	The Ashlee Simpson Show	TV series episode: "Ashlee Turns 20"	"Somewhere Only We Know"
2005	Grey's Anatomy	TV series episode: "The First Cut is the Deepest"	"Somewhere Only We Know"
2005	One Tree Hill	TV series episode: "The Hero Dies in This One"	"She Has No Time"
2006	CSI: NY	TV series episode: "Consequences"	"Atlantic"
2006	Cold Case	TV series episode: "Joseph"	"Somewhere Only We Know"
2006	The O.C.	TV series episode: "The Avengers"	"A Bad Dream"
2006	ESPY Awards	TV awards show montage	"Somewhere Only We Know"
2006	The Lake House	Film trailer	"Somewhere Only We Know"
2006	FIFA 07	Video game	"Nothing in My Way"
2006	Madden NFL 07	Video game	"Is It Any Wonder?"
2006	Scrubs	TV series episode: "My Day at the Races"	"Everybody's Changing"
2006	SingStar Rocks!	Video game	"Somewhere Only We Know"
2006	Lead Balloon	TV series episode: "Allergic"	"Somewhere Only We Know"
2007	American Idol	TV series episode: "1 of 3 Voted Off"	"Somewhere Only We Know"
2007	American Idol	TV series episode: "Idol Gives Back"	"Somewhere Only We Know"
2007	Journeyman	TV series promos	"Somewhere Only We Know"
2007	L'isola dei famosi 2007	TV series episode: 17 October 2007	"Everybody's Changing"
2007	Match of the Day	TV sports program	"Somewhere Only We Know"
2007	Keinohrhasen	Film	"Everybody's Changing"
2007	No disparen al pianista	TV series episode: #2.11	"Is It Any Wonder?"
2007	No disparen al pianista	TV series episode: #2.11	"The Lovers Are Losing"
2007	Scrubs	TV series episode: "My Long Goodbye"	"A Bad Dream"
2008	90210	TV series episode: "Model Behavior"	"Spiralling"
2008	LOL (Laughing Out Loud)	Film	"Somewhere Only We Know"
2008	Paris	Film trailer	"Somewhere Only We Know"
2009	The City	TV series episode: "Unexpected Roommates"	"Love Is the End"
2009	Doctor Who Confidential	TV series episode: "The Eleventh Doctor"	"Spiralling"
2009	He's Just Not That Into You	Film	"Somewhere Only We Know"
2009	Kyle XY	TV series episode: "Life Support"	"A Bad Dream"
2009	Life	TV series episode: "Shelf Life"	"Somewhere Only We Know"
2009	One Tree Hill	TV series episode: "Searching for a Former Clarity"	"Love Is the End"
2009	One Tree Hill	TV series episode: "We Change, We Wait"	"Spiralling"
2009	Pro Evolution Soccer 2010	Video game	"Again and Again"
2009	Pro Evolution Soccer 2010	Video game	"Pretend That You're Alone"
2010	Brothers and Sisters	TV series episode: "A Bone to Pick"	"She Has No Time"
2010	Grey's Anatomy	TV series episode: "Shiny Happy People"	"My Shadow"
2010	Melrose Place	TV series episode: "Oriole"	"Love Is the End"
2010	Mission London	Film	"Is It Any Wonder?"
2010	The Vampire Diaries	TV series episode: "There Goes the Neighborhood"	"Better Than This"
2011	Pro Evolution Soccer 2011	Video game	"Stop for a Minute"
2011	Winnie the Pooh	Trailer	"Somewhere Only We Know"
2011	Glee	TV series episode: Born This Way	"Somewhere Only We Know"
2011	CSI: NY	TV series episode: "Keep It Real"	"My Shadow"
2012	Stella	TV series episode: "Episode 10"	"Bedshaped"
2013	Grey's Anatomy	TV series episode: "Sleeping Monster"	"Sea Fog"
2016	A Monster Calls	Film	"Tear Up This Town"
2021	Ted Lasso	TV series episode: "Man City"	"Somewhere Only We Know"
2023	Beef	TV series episode: "I Am a Cage"	"Somewhere Only We Know"
