= Keane Live =

Video by Keane
- Released: 19 November 2007
- Recorded: 21 July 2007
- Venue: The O2 Arena, London
- Length: 230 minutes
- Label: Island Records; Universal Music

Keane chronology
Under the Iron Sea DVD (2006)	Keane Live (2007)	Perfect Symmetry DVD (2008)

Keane Live is English alternative rock band Keane's fourth DVD, second proper. It was recorded at London's The O2 Arena during the band's Under the Iron Sea Tour and released on 19 November 2007.

== Contents ==
=== Live Concert ===
1. "The Iron Sea"
2. "Everybody’s Changing"
3. "Put It Behind You"
4. "Nothing in My Way"
5. "We Might as Well Be Strangers"
6. "Bend and Break"
7. "Can't Stop Now" (upbeaten)
8. "Try Again" (Chaplin on distortion piano)
9. "Your Eyes Open" (acoustic, Chaplin on guitar)
10. "The Frog Prince" (semi-acoustic, Chaplin on guitar)
11. "Hamburg Song"
12. "Fly To Me" (prelude)
13. "Leaving So Soon?"
14. "This Is the Last Time"
15. "A Bad Dream" (Chaplin on piano)
16. "Somewhere Only We Know"
17. "Is It Any Wonder?"
18. "Broken Toy" (Chaplin on guitar solo, acoustic)
19. "Atlantic"
20. "Crystal Ball"
21. "Bedshaped" (extended)

=== Short Film ===
- "The Build-up To The Show"

=== Soundcheck ===
- "Is It Any Wonder?"

=== Live Visuals ===
- "A Bad Dream"
- "Is It Any Wonder?"
- "Atlantic"

== Band members ==
- Tom Chaplin – lead vocals, acoustic guitar, distortion CP60
- Tim Rice-Oxley – piano, keyboards, programming, backing vocals, distortion CP70
- Richard Hughes – drums, backing vocals
