= Retrospective EPs =

Retrospective EPs 1 & 2

EP by Keane
- Released: 5 December 2008 (EP1); 28 June 2010 (EP2)
- Genre: Alternative
- Label: None
- Producer: Keane

Keane chronology
Perfect Symmetry (2008)	Retrospective EPs 1 & 2 (2008)	Night Train (2010)

The Retrospective EPs are a series of digital EPs by English rock band Keane, with the first being released on 5 December 2008 as the Everybody's Changing EP or Retrospective EP1. The cover art features the font Cochin for the first time since the release of "Bend and Break" in 2005.

== Everybody's Changing ==
The first Retrospective EP was the band's 2003 and 2004 hit single "Everybody's Changing", from their debut album Hopes and Fears. The final track "Into the Light" was never released, and features pianist Rice-Oxley on lead vocals. Although this is the third release by the band marketed as an EP, none of them has actually featured the common studio CD format.

=== Track listing ===
All tracks written by Tim Rice-Oxley, Tom Chaplin, and Richard Hughes

1. "Everybody's Changing" (original demo)
2. "Everybody's Changing" (demo from July 2002)
3. "Everybody's Changing" (Fierce Panda version)
4. "Everybody's Changing" (live version from first Lamacq Live electric session on Radio 1)
5. "Fly to Me" (demo)
6. "Into the Light" (demo; unreleased)
7. Video chat of Tim interviewed by Tom about "Everybody's Changing"

== Sunshine ==
Retrospective EP2 was based around the songs Keane recorded with producer James Sanger in France during the early 2000s, comprising demos of "Sunshine" and "This Is the Last Time". It also includes a demo for "The Happy Soldier", previously known by leaked recordings, and the demo of "Maps", a version never heard before. It was leaked before release in early April 2010 on the online music store 7digital. It was officially released on 29 June 2010.

=== Track listing ===
All tracks written by Tim Rice-Oxley, Tom Chaplin, and Richard Hughes (with James Sanger on tracks 1–4, 6)

1. "Sunshine" (demo)
2. "Sunshine" (live at Glastonbury June 2005)
3. "This Is the Last Time" (demo 26 October)
4. "This Is the Last Time" (demo 31 March 2003)
5. "Maps" (demo; leaked different version of this song is available on the Internet)
6. "Walnut Tree" (demo; final version appears as the B-side of "Somewhere Only We Know")
7. "The Happy Soldier" (unreleased song; first leaked on a Compact Disc from the James Sanger sessions. Keane did not want this to be released, but it eventually became well known by fanbase)
