= Try Again (Keane song) =

2007 single by Keane

Single by Keane

from the album Under the Iron Sea
- B-side: "Nothing in My Way" (live); "Is It Any Wonder?" (live); "Bedshaped" (live); "Everybody's Changing" (live); "This Is the Last Time" (live); "A Bad Dream" (live); "Somewhere Only We Know" (live); "The Frog Prince" (live); "Try Again" (live)
- Released: 9 February 2007
- Recorded: 2005
- Length: 4:27
- Label: Island
- Songwriters: Tim Rice-Oxley; Tom Chaplin; Richard Hughes
- Producers: Andy Green; Keane

Keane singles chronology
"A Bad Dream" (2007)	"Try Again" (2007)	"The Night Sky" (2007)

"Try Again" is a song performed and composed by English alternative rock band Keane that appears as the 10th track on their second studio album, Under the Iron Sea (2006). The song was released as the sixth single off the album only in Germany on 9 February 2007. This is also Keane's first single with three B-sides, all live performances from Cologne, Germany.

== Composition and recording ==
"Try Again" was composed by Tim Rice-Oxley in early 2005 and first played live two weeks after composed by Rice-Oxley. The song was first played with the electric piano and a tambourine as very much a work-in-progress, and as a result was shorter than the recorded version.

The album version is a melancholic piano ballad, featuring drums, synthesizers, an extended outro, along with Rice-Oxley's electric piano. In the extended outro, distortion piano notes can also be heard from lead singer Tom Chaplin's Yamaha CP60M.

Rufus Wainwright was asked by Keane to sing this song along with Chaplin at the Wireless Music Festival on 29 June 2005. Chaplin apparently wanted Wainwright to also play the piano, but he refused. The song was recorded and at the Heliosentric Studios in Rye, East Sussex, and at The Magic Shop in New York City in late 2005.

== Meaning ==
Rice-Oxley explains his thoughts about "Try Again" on the fifth Keane podcast:

I always think about it as being a commuter's love song. There's something weird about that feeling of being on a train really really late at night when there's just a handful of you there, and I always wonder what everyone's story is – especially people who've been to work and probably got up at some horrendous hour of the morning, and they're traipsing back to their home somewhere in the suburbs.

== Track listings ==
German CD1
No.	Title	Length
1.	"Try Again"
2.	"Nothing in My Way" (live)
3.	"Is It Any Wonder?" (live)
4.	"Bedshaped" (live)

German CD2
No.	Title	Length
1.	"Try Again"
2.	"Everybody's Changing" (live)
3.	"This Is the Last Time" (live)
4.	"A Bad Dream" (live)

German CD3
No.	Title	Length
1.	"Try Again"	4:27
2.	"Somewhere Only We Know" (live)	4:23
3.	"The Frog Prince" (live)	4:29
4.	"Try Again" (live)	4:18

== Charts ==
Chart (2007)	Peak position
Germany (GfK)	39
Switzerland (Schweizer Hitparade)	83
