= Love Too Much =

Love Too Much may refer to:

- "Love Too Much", a 2014 song by Hunter Hayes from Storyline
- "Love Too Much", a 2019 song by Keane from Cause and Effect
