= Call Me What You Like (Keane song) =

2000 single by Keane

Single by Keane
- B-side: "Rubbernecking"; "Closer Now"
- Released: 31 January 2000
- Studio: Home recording Sync City
- Genre: Indie rock
- Length: 5:19
- Label: Zoomorphic
- Songwriters: Tom Chaplin; Dominic Scott; Tim Rice-Oxley; Richard Hughes; James Sanger
- Producers: Keane; Adam Tudhope

Keane singles chronology
"Call Me What You Like" (2000)	"Wolf at the Door" (2001)

"Call Me What You Like" (2000) is a song by Keane, released as their first single in early 2000. Limited to 500 copies, the now rare record was mixed and released by Zoomorphic, the band's own label set up to promote their music when a record deal was not forthcoming. It was subsequently sold at pub venues during early Keane gigs.

The title track and B-side "Closer Now" are two of the few songs credited to lead singer Tom Chaplin that have appeared on official releases. A re-recording of the single was included as a B-side on their follow-up 2001 single, "Wolf at the Door", and all three tracks appear on the 2009 Deluxe Edition release of the band's debut album, Hopes and Fears.

== Track listing ==
=== CD single ===
1. "Call Me What You Like"
2. "Rubbernecking"
3. "Closer Now"

"Rubbernecking", remixed in 2001 by Tim Rice-Oxley and Tom Walker from the Universal Constructors, is an electronic piece little related to Keane's usual repertoire, featuring deep bass and heavy synthesizers.
On the other hand, "Closer Now" expresses a lighter atmosphere. Annie Lennox recorded a cover version of the song in 2009 for her album The Annie Lennox Collection. Lennox retitled the song "Pattern of My Life", which refers to a lyric in the song.
At least one demo version also exists on the web, featuring a deeper rhythm and slightly different vocals, with the same lyrics.

== Technical information on songs ==
Song	Length	Tempo	Key	Time signature	Genre
"Call Me What You Like"	5:19	93bpm	Cm (Do minor)	4/4 on 8 beats	Alternative
"Rubbernecking"	6:01	65bpm	Bb (Si flat major)	4/4 on 8 beats	Alternative
"Closer Now"	4:57	92bpm	E (Mi major)	4/4 on 8 beats	Alternative
