= The Night Sky =

Single by Keane
- B-side: "Under Pressure"; "Put It Behind You" (Ffrisco mix)
- Released: 29 October 2007
- Studio: Heliocentric
- Genre: Alternative rock
- Length: 5:03
- Label: Island
- Songwriter(s): Tim Rice-Oxley; Tom Chaplin; Richard Hughes
- Producer(s): Keane; Andy Green

Keane singles chronology
"Try Again" (2007)	"The Night Sky" (2007)	"Spiralling" (2008)

"The Night Sky" is a song written and performed by English rock band Keane. The song was released as a one-off charity single released by the band in aid of War Child. It was released as a download on 22 October 2007 and then a physical release on Island Records on 29 October 2007. It was also released in USB format, and was the third of Keane's singles to be released in this format.

The single was controversially deemed ineligible for the UK Singles Chart, due to the 7" vinyl containing a free poster; in the UK these are seen as 'free gifts', thus making any vinyl singles containing prints disqualified from the charts. A competition was run with the single's release, to win a program guide, signed by all the artists who played at War Child's charity concert in Brixton Academy. This also rendered it ineligible, as it is deemed an incentive for those who would not under other circumstances have bought the single. Selling the single under USB format was also believed to be the reason for its disqualification from the charts as the charts do not recognize single sales released under the USB format which several Keane singles have been released under.

In Mexico, rather than "The Night Sky", the single's B-side "Under Pressure" was broadcast as an A-side following the song's popularity and its previous release by BBC Radio 1.

== Background ==
The song is written from a child's point of view on war, thus the support for the War Child charity. It was composed by pianist Tim Rice-Oxley in late 2005 and was meant to be included on Under the Iron Sea, the band's second album, but was replaced on the definite track list on 14 March 2006.

A cover of 1981 David Bowie and Queen's classic single "Under Pressure", for Radio 1's 40th anniversary is on the Bside of the single. It was also included on the Radio 1: Established 1967 CD released on 1 October. In this cover, singer Tom Chaplin reaches the highest tone achieved by him in a recording (A5) holding the note four seconds more than Freddie Mercury on Queen's original version.

On 29 September 2017 the band announced through Twitter and Facebook that the song would be rereleased on streaming services on 3 November. The announcement was accompanied by a competition to design the new cover for the single.

== Track listing ==
CD

1. "The Night Sky" – 5:05
2. "Under Pressure" – 3:54
3. "Put It Behind You" (Ffrisco Mix) – 5:44

Limited 7" (with free print)

1. "The Night Sky"
2. "Under Pressure"

USB Release

1. "The Night Sky"
2. "Under Pressure"
3. "Put It Behind You" (Ffrisco Mix)

Download

1. "The Night Sky" (Radio Edit) – 3:27
2. "The Night Sky" – 5:03
3. "Under Pressure" – 3:50
4. "Put It Behind You" (Ffrisco Mix) – 5:43
5. "The Night Sky" (Demo) – 4:24

== Technical information ==
Song	Length	Tempo	Key	Time signature	Genre
"The Night Sky"	5:03	72bpm	A (La major)	4/4	Power ballad
"Under Pressure"	3:50	95bpm	D (Re major)	4/4 on 8 beats	Rock
"Put It Behind You" (Ffrisco mix)	5:43	138bpm	C (Do major)	4/4	Electronica

== Release history ==
Country	Date	Track
United Kingdom	29 October 2007	"The Night Sky"
Mexico	16 November 2007	"Under Pressure"
Mexico	20 July 2008	"The Night Sky"
