= Tear Up This Town =

Single by Keane
- Released: 23 September 2016
- Recorded: January 2016
- Genre: Piano rock; pop rock; alternative rock; piano pop
- Length: 3:07
- Label: Island
- Songwriter(s): Tim Rice-Oxley
- Producer(s): Tim Rice-Oxley and Dan Grech-Marguerat

Keane singles chronology
"Won't Be Broken" (2014)	"Tear Up This Town" (2016)	"The Way I Feel" (2019)

"Tear Up This Town" is a 2016 song by English alternative rock band Keane. The song was released as a one-off single to feature on the soundtrack of the 2016 fantasy film A Monster Calls, directed by J. A. Bayona (Keane worked with Bayona on the video for their 2012 single "Disconnected"). The song was made available for digital download on 23 September 2016.

== Track listing ==
No.	Title	Length
1.	"Tear Up This Town" (orchestral version)	3:07
2.	"Tear Up This Town"	3:12

== Charts ==
Chart (2017)	Peak position
UK Vinyl Singles (Official Charts Company)	13
UK Physical Singles (Official Charts Company)	19
