= Cause and Effect (Keane album) =

2019 studio album by Keane

Studio album by Keane
- Released: 20 September 2019
- Recorded: November 2018 – Spring 2019
- Studio: Sea Fog Studios
- Length: 46:02
- Label: Island
- Producers: David Kosten and Keane

Keane chronology
The Best of Keane (2013)	Cause and Effect (2019)	Dirt (2021)

Singles from Cause and Effect
- 1. "The Way I Feel" Released: 6 June 2019; 2. "Love Too Much" Released: 8 August 2019; 3. "Stupid Things" Released: 24 October 2019

Cause and Effect is the fifth studio album by English alternative rock band Keane, released on 20 September 2019 through Island Records. It is their first full-length album since Strangeland (2012) and hiatus from early 2014 to late 2018. Cause and Effect peaked at No.2 on the UK Albums Chart.

== Promotion ==
The first single, "The Way I Feel", premiered on 6 June 2019 on BBC Radio 2 and YouTube.

The second single, "Love Too Much", premiered on 8 August 2019 on BBC Radio 2 and YouTube.

== Critical reception ==
Professional ratings
Aggregate scores
Source	Rating
AnyDecentMusic?	6.2/10
Metacritic	68/100
Review scores
Source	Rating
AllMusic	3.5/5 stars
The Arts Desk	4/5 stars
The Daily Telegraph	4/5 stars
Evening Standard	3/5 stars
Financial Times	3/5 stars
The Guardian	3/5 stars
The Independent	3/5 stars
NME	3/5 stars
Q	4/5 stars
The Times	4/5 stars

Cause and Effect received generally positive reviews from critics. At Metacritic, which assigns a normalised rating out of 100 to reviews from mainstream publications, the album received an average score of 68, based on 7 reviews, indicating "generally favorable reviews".

Neil Z. Yeung of AllMusic gave the album three and a half stars out of five, writing, "Not a game-changing comeback by any means, Cause and Effect is instead a satisfying return to form that manages to gracefully age Keane by invigorating a familiar formula with wisdom and honesty learned over a dramatic, life-changing decade."

== Track listing ==
All tracks are written by Keane.

No.	Title	Length
1.	"You're Not Home"	5:31
2.	"Love Too Much"	3:09
3.	"The Way I Feel"	4:06
4.	"Put the Radio On"	4:11
5.	"Strange Room"	4:23
6.	"Stupid Things"	3:48
7.	"Phases"	3:36
8.	"I'm Not Leaving"	4:13
9.	"Thread"	4:51
10.	"Chase the Night Away"	4:03
11.	"I Need Your Love"	4:11
Total length:		46:02

Deluxe edition additional tracks
No.	Title	Length
12.	"New Golden Age"	3:44
13.	"Difficult Year"	3:28
14.	"The Way I Feel" (Sea Fog acoustic session)	3:35
15.	"Stupid Things" (Sea Fog acoustic session)	4:02
16.	"I'm Not Leaving" (Sea Fog acoustic session)	4:09

Japanese bonus track
No.	Title	Length
17.	"Thread" (original demo)	5:08
Total length:		70:18

Retroactive CD
No.	Title	Length
1.	"Somewhere Only We Know" (Sprint Music Series, 2003)
2.	"Bedshaped" (live at Roundhouse Studios, 2013)
3.	"Spiralling" (2008 demo)
4.	"Silenced by the Night" (Sea Fog acoustic session, 2012)
5.	"Again and Again" (2007 demo)
6.	"In Your Own Time" (2010 demo)
7.	"Glass Bottles" (unreleased demo)
8.	"Better Than This" (2007 demo)
9.	"Strangeland" (Dallas Sketch, 2011)
10.	"The Lovers Are Losing" (2008 demo)
11.	"This Is the Last Time" (Real Network Session, Seattle 2014)
12.	"Sunshine" (2002 demo)

== Personnel ==
Keane

- Tom Chaplin – vocals
- Tim Rice-Oxley – piano, keyboards, backing vocals
- Richard Hughes – drums, percussion, backing vocals
- Jesse Quin – bass guitar, keyboards, backing vocals

== Charts ==
Chart (2019)	Peak position
Australian Digital Albums (ARIA)	25
Austrian Albums (Ö3 Austria)	56
Belgian Albums (Ultratop Flanders)	15
Belgian Albums (Ultratop Wallonia)	9
Dutch Albums (Album Top 100)	11
French Albums (SNEP)	61
German Albums (Offizielle Top 100)	16
Irish Albums (IRMA)	12
Portuguese Albums (AFP)	8
Scottish Albums (Official Charts)	2
Spanish Albums (Promusicae)	9
Swiss Albums (Schweizer Hitparade)	18
UK Albums (Official Charts)	2
US Top Alternative Albums (Billboard)	15

== Certifications ==
Region	Certification	Certified units/sales
United Kingdom (BPI)	Silver	60,000^{‡}
^{‡} Sales+streaming figures based on certification alone.
