= A Bad Dream =

Single by Keane

from the album Under the Iron Sea
- Released: 22 January 2007
- Studio: Heliocentric (Rye, East Sussex); Magic Shop (New York City)
- Length: 5:06 (album version); 4:05 (radio edit)
- Label: Island
- Songwriter(s): Tim Rice-Oxley; Tom Chaplin; Richard Hughes
- Producer(s): Andy Green; Keane

Keane singles chronology
| "Nothing in My Way" (2006) | "A Bad Dream" (2007) | "Try Again" (2007) |

"A Bad Dream" is a song by English rock band Keane appearing as the fifth track on their second album, Under the Iron Sea. It was released on 22 January 2007 as the fifth and final single from the album. The song peaked at No. 23 in the UK Singles Chart, becoming the band's first single to miss the top 20.

== Track listings ==
=== CD single ===
Catalogue number: 1723057

1. "A Bad Dream"
2. "She Sells Sanctuary"
3. "A Bad Dream" (Luna-C Hardcore Remix)
4. "A Bad Dream" live in Berlin (video)

=== UK 7-inch vinyl ===
Catalogue: 1723058

1. "A Bad Dream"
2. "She Sells Sanctuary"

=== 256 MB USB memory stick content ===
  - "A Bad Dream"
  - "A Bad Dream" (video)
  - "Enjoy the Silence" (Depeche Mode cover)
  - "A Bad Dream" (Luna-C Bangin' Remix)
  - Competition to see the band at Wembley

== Background ==
It was partially based on the "An Irish Airman Foresees His Death" poem by W. B. Yeats. Rice-Oxley explained on a podcast:

We wanted to get a balance between a kinda dream sequence. It starts very quietly, and I love the idea of being in a plane, like a Spitfire or something, being so high up in the sky that you can't hear the guns below you and so on. And it's almost got a serene silence which is what this Yeats poem seemed to really express. The song starts very quietly, but it gets huge and angry as it goes on... The big distorted washy piano sound in the middle is a pretty vast sound and it's I guess an attempt to express all that anger bursting out.

== Composition and recording ==
It was composed by Tim Rice-Oxley and Tom Chaplin. It was recorded at the Heliocentric Studios, Rye, East Sussex and at The Magic Shop, New York.

== Music video ==
The music video for "A Bad Dream" was shot on 22 November 2006 and premiered a month later. Singer Tom Chaplin appears inside a totally black room. Then a white stripe of light can be seen getting bigger and bigger until the room becomes completely white. Later on, a black stripe can be seen again getting bigger and bigger until the whole room is black again.

An alternate version released on Yahoo Launch UK features short clips of Tim Rice-Oxley and Richard Hughes intercut into the original, looking at Chaplin with melancholic faces.

== Chart performance ==
| Chart | Peak position |
|---|---|
| Netherlands (Dutch Top 40) | 77 |
| UK Singles (OCC) | 23 |
| UK Singles Downloads (OCC) | 37 |
