= Bedshaped =

2004 single by Keane

- European CD 1 artwork

Single by Keane

from the album Hopes and Fears
- Released: 16 August 2004
- Studio: Heliocentric (Rye, East Sussex, England)
- Length: 4:35 (album version); 3:57 (radio version)
- Label: Island
- Songwriters: James Sanger; Richard Hughes; Thomas Chaplin; Timothy Rice-Oxley
- Producer: Andy Green

Keane singles chronology
"Everybody's Changing" (2004)	"Bedshaped" (2004)	"This Is the Last Time" (2004)

Music video
- "Bedshaped" on YouTube

"Bedshaped" is a song by English rock band Keane, released as the third single from Hopes and Fears. It became their third consecutive top-10 hit on the UK Singles Chart, after "Somewhere Only We Know" and "Everybody's Changing", peaking at number 10. The song also reached the top 20 in Denmark and the Netherlands.

== Background and meaning ==
"Bedshaped" was composed in 2001 by Tim Rice-Oxley. It was originally released as a B-side on the Fierce Panda release of "Everybody's Changing" in May 2003. James Sanger is credited on this song as the fourth composer.

Rice-Oxley posted an explanation of the song on the official message board:

[The song] is about feeling that you've been "left behind" by an old friend or lover, and about hoping that you'll be reunited one day so that you can live out the end of your lives together the way you started them (...) a hope that they'll eventually want to get away from the bright lights and come back home. It's a sad and angry song, but also full of hope. I think I'm right in saying that in hospital when someone is ill and has to spend a lot of time in bed they can become 'bedshaped'. It sounds a bit depressing (...) but in the context of the song I wanted to suggest old age and frailty(...)

== Composition ==
The song is written in the key of E major, with a tempo of 76bpm. After a mysterious intro, a honky tonk-reminiscent electric grand piano completes the main riff, with an Emaj chord. The vocals are introduced 59 seconds in. After the second chorus, a small piano-riff gives way to the song's instrumental bridge. This features gothic voices, and ends with a soaring synth lead-line (often sung by Chaplin during live performances). The song ends with Chaplin singing "But what do I know?, what do I know? I know".

In live performances since he joined the band, bassist Jesse Quin typically plays keyboards.

== Music video ==
The video for the song is available on the enhanced CD single version, as well as the bonus DVD edition of Hopes and Fears and on Strangers. The video is directed by Corin Hardy, and based on his 2003 stop-motion animated short film "Butterfly". The video shows a bedraggled, naked man amongst some refuse, drowning his sorrows in alcohol. He is lonely and sad, and crawls into a bathroom where he hides, and writes some of the song's lyrics such as 'don't laugh at me' and "don't look away" on the walls, like graffiti. A cat drags some ill-fitting clothes into the room for him, where he dresses and dares to venture outside. He exits and sees people gathered in a restaurant. He hallucinates and their faces turn into gremlin-like monsters, causing him to run back to the bathroom in fear, only for the walls to collapse and drown him in white light. The wizened man finds himself against a white background, where he witnesses animated versions of Keane's band members playing the titular song with the lyrics he wrote on the walls. Having seemingly found solace in this unusual scene, the man, along with Keane, fades into the light.

The band appears throughout as animation within the background of the main action, and as drawings towards the end of the video. To achieve this, Hardy's friend David Lupton was recruited to hand-draw 500 pictures of the band in the space of a week.

The music video was produced by Kit Hawkins and Adam Tudhope for White House Pictures.

== Track listings ==
CD CID870

1. "Bedshaped" – 4:38
2. "Something in Me Was Dying" – 4:46
3. "Untitled 2" – 3:02
4. "Bedshaped" (Video) – 4:41

UK, 7-inch vinyl IS849

1. "Bedshaped"
2. "Something in Me Was Dying"

== Alternative versions ==
=== The Netherlands, 3CD ===
All live tracks recorded at BNN
CD1
Released 15 October 2004

1. "Bedshaped" – 4:37
2. "Something in Me Was Dying" – 4:47
3. "Everybody's Changing" (live) – 3:35
4. "Can't Stop Now" (live) – 3:41

CD2
Released 19 October 2004

1. "Bedshaped" – 4:37
2. "Untitled 2" – 3:01
3. "Somewhere Only We Know" (live) – 3:32
4. "Bend and Break" (live) – 3:36
5. "Bedshaped" (video) – 4:41

CD3
Released 12 November 2004

1. "Bedshaped" – 4:38
2. "This Is the Last Time" (live) – 3:27
3. "We Might as Well Be Strangers" (live) – 3:10
4. "Bedshaped" (live) – 4:08
5. "Bedshaped" (live video) – 4:47

=== Germany, 2CD, DVD ===
Released 18 April 2005
CD1

1. "Bedshaped"
2. "This Is the Last Time"
3. "Untitled 2"
4. "Everybody's Changing" (live) (Airwaves Festival, Reykjavík, 23 October 2004)
5. "Somewhere Only We Know" (live) (Forum, London, 10 May 2004)

CD2

1. "Bedshaped"
2. "Something in Me Was Dying"
3. "This Is the Last Time" (live acoustic) (Mill St. Brewery, Toronto, 20 September 2004)
4. "Bedshaped" (live) (Brixton Academy, London, 17 November 2004)
5. "We Might as Well Be Strangers" (live) (Columbiafritz, Berlin, 19 May 2004)

DVD

1. "Bedshaped" (video)
2. "Somewhere Only We Know" (video)
3. "Everybody's Changing" (video)
4. "This Is the Last Time" (video)

=== Switzerland, CD ===
Released 18 April 2005

1. "Bedshaped"
2. "Something in Me Was Dying"
3. "This Is the Last Time" (live acoustic) (Mill St. Brewery, Toronto, 20 September 2004)
4. "Bedshaped" (live) (Brixton Academy, London, 17 November 2004)

=== Austria, 2CD ===
Released 18 April 2005 CD1

1. "Bedshaped"
2. "This Is the Last Time"
3. "Untitled 2"
4. "Everybody's Changing" (live) (Airwaves Festival, Reykjavík, 23 October 2004)
5. "Somewhere Only We Know"

CD2

1. "Bedshaped"
2. "Something in Me Was Dying"
3. "This Is the Last Time" (live acoustic) (Mill St. Brewery, Toronto, 20 September 2004)
4. "Bedshaped" (live) (Brixton Academy, London, 17 November 2004)
5. "We Might as Well Be Strangers" (live) (Columbiafritz, Berlin, 19 May 2004)

=== Promo version ===
1. "Bedshaped"

== B-sides ==
"Something in Me Was Dying"

- Length: 4:46
- Tempo: 107bpm
- Key: G (maj)
- Time signature: 4/4
- Instrumentation: piano, drums, bass, synthesizer

"Untitled 2"

- Length: 3:02
- Tempo: 110bpm
- Key: Bb (B flat, maj)
- Time signature: 3/4
- Instrumentation: electric piano, bass, drums

== Charts ==
Chart (2004–2005)	Peak position
Belgium (Ultratip Bubbling Under Flanders)	7
Belgium (Ultratip Bubbling Under Wallonia)	2
Denmark (Tracklisten)	7
Germany (GfK)	61
Greece (IFPI)	22
Ireland (IRMA)	38
Netherlands (Dutch Top 40)	26
Netherlands (Single Top 100)	13
Scotland Singles (OCC)	11
UK Singles (OCC)	10

== Certifications ==
Region	Certification	Certified units/sales
United Kingdom (BPI)	Silver	200,000^{‡}
^{‡} Sales+streaming figures based on certification alone.

== Cover versions ==
- Italian opera singer Vittorio Grigolo recorded an Italian-language version of "Bedshaped", renamed "Cosi", which appears on his album In the Hands of Love.
- British band Marillion recorded a cover on their live album Friends.
