= This Is the Last Time =

2003 single by Keane

Single by Keane
- B-side: "Can't Stop Now"; "Allemande"
- Released: 13 October 2003
- Studio: Westside
- Length: 3:31
- Label: Fierce Panda; White Light
- Songwriters: Tim Rice-Oxley (main composer); Tom Chaplin; Richard Hughes; James Sanger
- Producers: Andy Green; James Sanger; Keane

Keane singles chronology
"Everybody's Changing" (2003)	"This Is the Last Time" (2003)	"Somewhere Only We Know" (2004)

"This Is the Last Time" is a song performed and composed by British rock band Keane, released on 22 November 2004 as the fourth commercial single from their debut album, Hopes and Fears (2004). It was first released with Fierce Panda Records on 13 October 2003 and later in 2004 as a different version with Island Records. It was released as track two of the international version, but track nine on the British version. The single reached number 18 on the UK chart in November 2004.

== Fierce Panda single ==
The Fierce Panda version was the first Keane record released outside the UK and one of the few singles available in the United States. The single sold around 4,000 copies and is stated to have charted at number 58; however, this was ineligible for the chart due to the hyperlink the record contained. It was the only record ever co-released with White Light Records, Keane's own label, which soon disappeared since there was already a company with that name.

== Island single ==
"This Is the Last Time"

Single by Keane

from the album Hopes and Fears
- B-side: "She Opens Her Eyes"; "This Is the Last Time" (demo); "Everybody's Changing" (live)
- Released: 22 November 2004
- Studio: Helioscentric (Rye, East Sussex, England)
- Length: 3:29
- Label: Island
- Songwriters: Tim Rice-Oxley; Tom Chaplin; Richard Hughes; James Sanger
- Producers: Andy Green; James Sanger; Keane

Keane singles chronology
"Bedshaped" (2004)	"This Is the Last Time" (2004)	"Bend and Break" (2005)

A year after signing with Island Records, a reissue of the song was released on 22 November 2004. This version featured a new cover of a bull on a yellow background, the version of the song from Hopes and Fears, an all-new B-side "She Opens Her Eyes", a demo of the single from 2003 with Rice-Oxley on lead vocals, and the music video for the single. Additionally, a DVD single was released, using a cover showing a deer instead of the bull used on the CD single cover, featuring live performances from the band and a photo gallery.

== Composition and meaning ==
Tim Rice-Oxley composed this song circa 2001. It was one of the first songs played without Dominic Scott, ex-guitarist of the band, being possibly about him. It was recorded at Les Essarts, Normandy, France, during the James Sanger sessions from August to November 2001. A newer version was recorded at the Helioscentric Studios in Rye, East Sussex.

The song means regret, confusion and separating, commented by Rice-Oxley:

(…) You have a bond with someone but you don't want to stay with them forever, so you decide to go. But you're not saying "I hate you and I'm leaving"...you're trying to say "I think you're great but I've seen that there's something more perfect and magical out there for me and I need to find it. But I will always be your friend if you need me." (…) I guess the feeling of conflict within yourself and the difficulty of making that decision is what the song is really about. It's not sarcastic or anything but it is certainly confusing(…)

== Music videos ==
The first music video for "This Is the Last Time" was used only during gigs as a live visual. This first video featured a baby in a pushchair, graffiti on the walls and pink trees without leaves. The next two different videos were released for British and American markets, with the Fierce Panda single in 2003. The second video clip shows several trees under a pink sky and rain falling down. Island Records used this idea to shoot a third video with a similar background but this time Keane appearing on it.

The fourth and final video was directed by Howard Greenhaigh from Exposure Films and shot between 4 and 5 October 2004. The video starts with Keane playing in the middle of the street. Then, Chaplin starts walking with his microphone. He realizes the cable of the microphone cannot go farther so he changes his microphone for a taxicab radio. He continues walking with the radio and again he cannot go on because of the cable. Finally Chaplin sees a music store, gets another microphone and then breaks the window. The band are now playing inside the store and now there is also a crowd watching them.

== B-sides ==
"Can't Stop Now"

For more information about this song, visit "Can't Stop Now".

"Allemande"

Only available on the Fierce Panda CD. Rice-Oxley explained to some fans the title is inspired by a family of pianos called Allemande. "Allemande" was played live a few times during 2004. It also appeared on the EP Live Recordings 2004, on the Japanese version of Hopes and Fears and on the "Bend and Break" single.

"She Opens Her Eyes"

- Echoes
- Piano (Yamaha CP70)
- Vocals (by Tom Chaplin)

"This Is the Last Time" (demo)

Tim Rice-Oxley is the lead vocalist in this no-drums driven demo of the single.

== Track listings ==
Fierce Panda CD single (NING147CD)

1. "This Is the Last Time" – 3:31
2. "Can't Stop Now" – 3:40
3. "Allemande" – 4:22

Island CD single (CID880)

1. "This Is the Last Time"
2. "She Opens Her Eyes"
3. "This Is the Last Time" (demo)
4. "This Is the Last Time" (video)

Island Limited Edition DVD (CIDV880)

1. "Somewhere Only You Know" (secret gig)
2. "We Might as Well Be Strangers" (live; Villiers Theatre, London 5 February 2004)
3. "This Is the Last Time" (live; Irving Plaza New York City 29 September 2004)
4. Photo gallery – "This Is the Last Time" video.

UK 7-inch vinyl (IS880)

1. "This Is the Last Time"
2. "She Opens Her Eyes"

=== Island alternative versions ===
Netherlands

1. "This Is the Last Time"
2. "She Opens Her Eyes"

France, 2CD

CD1

1. "This Is the Last Time"
2. "She Opens Her Eyes"
3. "This Is the Last Time" (demo)
4. "This Is the Last Time" (video)

CD2

1. "This Is the Last Time"
2. "Everybody's Changing" (live; Airwaves Festival, Reykjavík 23 October 2004)

== Charts ==
=== Weekly charts ===
Chart (2003–2005)	Peak position
Belgium (Ultratip Bubbling Under Flanders)	6
Belgium (Ultratip Bubbling Under Wallonia)	2
France (SNEP)	56
Germany (GfK)	84
Ireland (IRMA)	43
Italy (FIMI)	37
Netherlands (Dutch Top 40)	3
Netherlands (Single Top 100)	43
Scottish Singles Sales (Official Charts)	23
UK Singles (Official Charts)	18

=== Year-end charts ===
Chart (2005)	Position
Netherlands (Dutch Top 40)	36

== Certifications ==
Region	Certification	Certified units/sales
Spain (Promusicae)	Gold	30,000^{‡}
United Kingdom (BPI)	Silver	200,000^{‡}
^{‡} Sales+streaming figures based on certification alone.
