= Bend and Break =

2005 single by Keane

Single by Keane

from the album Hopes and Fears
- Released: 25 July 2005
- Recorded: 2003
- Studio: Heliocentric Studios, Rye, East Sussex
- Genre: Pop rock
- Length: 3:39
- Label: Island
- Songwriters: Tim Rice-Oxley; Tom Chaplin; Richard Hughes
- Producer: Andy Green

Keane singles chronology
| "This Is the Last Time" (2004) | "Bend and Break" (2005) | "Atlantic" (2006) |

"Bend and Break" is a song performed and composed by English rock band Keane, released as the fifth and final single from their debut album Hopes and Fears.

== Track listing ==
1. "Bend and Break"
2. "On a Day Like Today"
3. "Allemande (Live)"
4. "Bend and Break" (live video)

Basto Re-mix (26 August 2013)

1. "Bend and Break" (Basto Re-Mix)

== Chart performance ==
Peak positions
| Chart | Peak position |
|---|---|
| Germany (GfK) | 95 |
| Netherlands (Dutch Top 40) | 27 |
| US Adult Alternative Airplay (Billboard) | 20 |

== See also ==
- List of songs by Keane
