= Hopes and Fears =

2004 studio album by Keane

Studio album by Keane
- Released: 10 May 2004
- Recorded: July 2001 – January 2004
- Studios: James Sanger's house in Normandy, France; Helioscentric in Rye, East Sussex, England
- Genres: Alternative rock; post-Britpop
- Length: 50:37
- Label: Island
- Producers: Andy Green; Keane; James Sanger

Keane chronology
Hopes and Fears (2004)	Under the Iron Sea (2006)

Alternative cover

Singles from Hopes and Fears
- 1. "Somewhere Only We Know" Released: 16 February 2004; 2. "Everybody's Changing" Released: 3 May 2004; 3. "Bedshaped" Released: 16 August 2004; 4. "This Is the Last Time" Released: 22 November 2004; 5. "Bend and Break" Released: 25 July 2005

Hopes and Fears is the debut album by the English alternative rock band Keane. It was released on 10 May 2004 in the United Kingdom and topped the UK Albums Chart upon release. It was the UK's second best-selling album of 2004, and has since been certified 9× Platinum by the BPI. The album returned to the top of the charts after winning a Brit Award for Best Album in February 2005.

With more than 2.7 million copies sold in the UK, Hopes and Fears ranks the 11th-best-selling album of the 2000s in the UK. In July 2011, it was ranked the 9th-highest-selling album of the 21st century in the UK. As of September 2019 it is the 36th-best-selling album in UK chart history. Worldwide, the album has sold over 5.8 million copies as of November 2009. It was also among ten albums nominated for the best British album of the previous 30 years by the Brit Awards in 2010, ultimately losing to (What's the Story) Morning Glory? by Oasis.

== Background and recording ==
Most songs were already composed by the album's conception date; the track "She Has No Time" was composed circa 1999, making it the earliest composed song appearing on the album. Some were already played in a guitar-led form with Dominic Scott still in the band. The tracks "On a Day Like Today" and "We Might As Well Be Strangers" were the last to be composed, circa 2003.

Four songs on the album were recorded in Normandy, France, on the property of the record producer James Sanger, from July to November 2001. Sanger co-wrote these songs, including "This Is the Last Time" and "Bedshaped". The rest of the album was recorded at Helioscentric Studios in Peasmarsh, Rye, by Andy Green and the band from September to Christmas 2003. Sanger did not attend any recording sessions in England.

The album was mixed down to six channels to enable a release on Super Audio CD (SACD).

Hal Leonard music published two versions of the official score book for Hopes and Fears, designed for differing skill levels. The Music Sales Group also published a book, including two demo CDs with accompanying bass and drum tracks.

== Critical reception ==
Professional ratings
Aggregate scores
Source	Rating
Metacritic	61/100
Review scores
Source	Rating
AllMusic	4.5/5 stars
Blender	3/5 stars
Entertainment Weekly	B
The Guardian	3/5 stars
The Independent	2/5 stars
NME	7/10
Pitchfork	2.8/10
Q	4/5 stars
Rolling Stone	3/5 stars
Spin	A−

Hopes and Fears received generally positive reviews from critics. Review-aggregating website Metacritic, reported a normalised score of 61/100, based on 18 reviews, indicating "generally favourable" reviews.

Playlouder was very positive, calling it "one of the best albums you'll hear this year", as was Q magazine, which gave it four out of five stars and wrote that "as a debut album, its confidence is right up there with [Oasis's] Definitely Maybe." AllMusic, giving the album four and a half out of five stars, praised its "beautiful, emotive dalliance of instrumentation", singer Tom Chaplin's "rich vocals", and the band's "open-hearted ambition...audible on every song", while Rolling Stone noted that the album "contains more hooks than most pop groups manage in their careers."

In a mixed three-star review, The Guardian criticised the first half the album for "rely[ing] too heavily on Chaplin's show-stopping vocals" and for the "radio-friendly simplicity of the lyrics", while praising "Can't Stop Now" as a "swooning, epic pop song" and the "booming drum and bass" of "Untitled 1" on the second half. Drowned in Sound gave it 5 out of 10, accusing Keane of excessively imitating Coldplay (specifically comparing "Your Eyes Open" and "On a Day Like Today" to, respectively, "Daylight" and "Politik" on the band's album A Rush of Blood to the Head), criticising the album as being "stylistically all over the place" and its lyrics as being "immature" and "cringe-worthy". However, it gave credit to the album's "fine moments", praising lead single "Somewhere Only We Know", for example, as "breathtaking".

=== Legacy ===
In 2006, British Hit Singles & Albums and NME organised a poll in which 40,000 people worldwide voted for the 100 best albums ever, and Hopes and Fears was placed at number 51 on the list. The album was ranked number 5 in Amazon's Best Selling Albums of the Decade. In 2005, the album won the Brit Award for best album. In 2010 the album was nominated for Brit awards in the category Album of 30 Years; however, it lost to Oasis's (What's the Story) Morning Glory?

In 2011, Q magazine made a list called 250 Best Albums of Q's Lifetime 1986–2010 and the album appeared at number 34.

== Track listing ==
=== Original release ===
All tracks are written by Tim Rice-Oxley, Tom Chaplin and Richard Hughes except where noted.

Original UK release/2007 Mexican reissue
No.	Title	Writer(s)	Length
1.	"Somewhere Only We Know"		3:57
2.	"Bend and Break"		3:40
3.	"We Might as Well Be Strangers"		3:12
4.	"Everybody's Changing"		3:35
5.	"Your Eyes Open"		3:23
6.	"She Has No Time"	Rice-Oxley; Chaplin; Hughes; James Sanger	5:45
7.	"Can't Stop Now"		3:38
8.	"Sunshine"	Rice-Oxley; Chaplin; Hughes; Sanger	4:12
9.	"This Is the Last Time"	Rice-Oxley; Chaplin; Hughes; Sanger	3:29
10.	"On a Day Like Today"		5:27
11.	"Untitled 1"		5:36
12.	"Bedshaped"	Rice-Oxley; Chaplin; Hughes; Sanger	4:38

=== Japanese edition ===
Bonus tracks
No.	Title	Length
13.	"Snowed Under"	3:52
14.	"Allemande"	4:24
15.	"Somewhere Only We Know" (video)

=== International editions ===
US and International editions; Super Audio CD version
No.	Title	Length
1.	"Somewhere Only We Know"	3:57
2.	"This Is the Last Time"	3:29
3.	"Bend and Break"	3:39
4.	"We Might as Well Be Strangers"	3:12
5.	"Everybody's Changing"	3:36
6.	"Your Eyes Open"	3:22
7.	"She Has No Time"	5:46
8.	"Can't Stop Now"	3:38
9.	"Sunshine"	4:12
10.	"Untitled 1"	5:36
11.	"Bedshaped"	4:39

=== Deluxe edition ===
Issued in 2009. The first CD includes the original UK track list, as seen above, plus tracks 13–19. The second CD presents B-sides, early singles, and other rare tracks.

CD 1: bonus tracks
No.	Title	Length
13.	"Somewhere Only We Know" (Lamacq live)	3:51
14.	"Bedshaped" (Lamacq live)	4:07
15.	"Bend and Break" (Lamacq live)	3:48
16.	"We Might as Well Be Strangers" (Lamacq live)	3:19
17.	"This Is the Last Time" (Jo Whiley's Live Lounge)	3:37
18.	"With or Without You" (U2 cover) (Jo Whiley's Live Lounge)	3:32
19.	"A Heart to Hold You" (Jo Whiley's Live Lounge)	3:58

CD 2: rare material
No.	Title	Length
1.	"Snowed Under" (B-side)
2.	"We Might as Well Be Strangers" (DJ Shadow remix)
3.	"Into the Light" (unreleased demo)
4.	"Call Me What You Like" (demo; Zoomorphic single 1)
5.	"Closer Now" (Zoomorphic single 1)
6.	"Rubbernecking" (Zoomorphic single 1)
7.	"Wolf at the Door" (Zoomorphic single 2)
8.	"She Has No Time" (demo; Zoomorphic single 2)
9.	"Call Me What You Like" (Zoomorphic single 2)
10.	"Everybody's Changing" (Fierce Panda single 1)
11.	"The Way You Want It" (Fierce Panda single 1)
12.	"This Is the Last Time" (demo; Fierce Panda single 2)
13.	"Bedshaped" (demo; Fierce Panda single 2)
14.	"Allemande" (Fierce Panda single 2)
15.	"Somewhere Only We Know" (live E.P. released 3/5/05)
16.	"We Might as Well Be Strangers" (live E.P. released 3/5/05)
17.	"This Is the Last Time" (live E.P. released 3/5/05)
18.	"Everybody's Changing" (live E.P. released 3/5/05)

== Personnel ==
Keane

- Tom Chaplin – lead vocals, co-lead vocals (9)
- Tim Rice-Oxley – piano, keyboards, bass, backing vocals, lead vocals (9)
- Richard Hughes – drums

Production

- Andy Green – programming and production
- Mark "Spike" Stent – mixing

== Charts ==
=== Weekly charts ===
Weekly chart performance for Hopes and Fears
Chart (2004–2006)	Peak position
Australian Albums (ARIA)	42
Austrian Albums (Ö3 Austria)	18
Belgian Albums (Ultratop Flanders)	10
Belgian Albums (Ultratop Wallonia)	5
Danish Albums (Hitlisten)	20
Dutch Albums (Album Top 100)	3
Finnish Albums (Suomen virallinen lista)	23
French Albums (SNEP)	5
German Albums (Offizielle Top 100)	30
Hungarian Albums (MAHASZ)	40
Irish Albums (IRMA)	3
Italian Albums (FIMI)	14
Mexican Albums (Top 100 Mexico)	8
New Zealand Albums (RMNZ)	11
Norwegian Albums (VG-lista)	2
Portuguese Albums (AFP)	1
Spanish Albums (Promusicae)	8
Swedish Albums (Sverigetopplistan)	10
Swiss Albums (Schweizer Hitparade)	22
UK Albums (Official Charts)	1
US Billboard 200	45
US Heatseekers Albums (Billboard)	1

=== Year-end charts ===
2004 year-end chart performance for Hopes and Fears
Chart (2004)	Position
Belgian Albums (Ultratop Flanders)	40
Belgian Albums (Ultratop Wallonia)	46
Dutch Albums (Album Top 100)	14
French Albums (SNEP)	110
Irish Albums (IRMA)	15
Italian Albums (FIMI)	71
Swedish Albums (Sverigetopplistan)	90
Swiss Albums (Schweizer Hitparade)	60
UK Albums (OCC)	2
Worldwide Albums (IFPI)	22

2005 year-end chart performance for Hopes and Fears
Chart (2005)	Position
Dutch Albums (Album Top 100)	12
European Albums (Billboard)	9
French Albums (SNEP)	32
Mexican Albums (Top 100 Mexico)	94
Spanish Albums (PROMUSICAE)	24
Swiss Albums (Schweizer Hitparade)	59
UK Albums (OCC)	18
US Billboard 200	131

2006 year-end chart performance for Hopes and Fears
Chart (2006)	Position
UK Albums (OCC)	109

2007 year-end chart performance for Hopes and Fears
Chart (2007)	Position
UK Albums (OCC)	180

== Certifications ==
Certifications and sales for Hopes and Fears
Region	Certification	Certified units/sales
Argentina (CAPIF)	Platinum	40,000^{^}
Austria (IFPI Austria)	Gold	15,000^{*}
Belgium (BRMA)	Platinum	50,000^{*}
Canada (Music Canada)	Platinum	100,000^{^}
Denmark (IFPI Danmark)	2× Platinum	40,000^{‡}
France (SNEP)	Platinum	300,000^{*}
Germany (BVMI)	Gold	100,000^{^}
Ireland (IRMA)	5× Platinum	75,000^{^}
Italy (FIMI) sales 2004-2006	Gold	50,000^{*}
Italy (FIMI) sales since 2009	Platinum	50,000^{‡}
Mexico (AMPROFON)	Gold	50,000^{^}
Netherlands (NVPI)	Platinum	80,000^{^}
Norway (IFPI Norway)	2× Platinum	80,000^{*}
Portugal (AFP)	2× Platinum	80,000^{^}
Spain (Promusicae)	Platinum	100,000^{^}
Switzerland (IFPI Switzerland)	Platinum	40,000^{^}
United Kingdom (BPI)	10× Platinum	3,000,000^{‡}
United States (RIAA)	Platinum	1,000,000^{‡}
Summaries
Europe (IFPI)	4× Platinum	4,000,000
^{*} Sales figures based on certification alone.^{^} Shipments figures based on certification alone.^{‡} Sales+streaming figures based on certification alone.

== Bonus DVD ==
Hopes and Fears

Video by Keane
- Released: 2004
- Recorded: Helioscentric Studios, various film sets.
- Genre: Rock
- Length: 19:40
- Labels: Island, Universal

Keane chronology
Hopes and Fears (2004)	Strangers (2005)

A CD+DVD version was released internationally over the course of 2005. This version included two bonus tracks, "Snowed Under" and a remix dance version of "We Might as Well Be Strangers" by DJ Shadow. The DVD contained the four international videos for "Somewhere Only We Know", "Everybody's Changing", "Bedshaped", and "This is the Last Time", and the US video for "Somewhere Only We Know".

This version of Hopes and Fears also featured a different box cover design: white and with Keane's "Everybody's Changing" promotional image. The inner 2-CD box had the same cover as the international version.

=== Track listing ===
1. "Somewhere Only We Know" (international version video)
2. "Somewhere Only We Know" (US version video)
3. "Everybody's Changing" (version 1 video)
4. "Bedshaped" (video)
5. "This Is the Last Time" (version 4 video)

==== Japanese version ====
1. Keane 30-second TV advertisement
2. "Somewhere Only We Know" (live)
3. "She Has No Time" (live)
4. "This Is the Last Time" (live)
5. "We Might As Well Be Strangers" (live)
6. "Everybody's Changing" (live)
7. "Bedshaped" (live)
8. "Somewhere Only We Know" (international version video)

== See also ==
- List of best-selling albums of the 2000s (decade) in the United Kingdom
