= Everybody's Changing =

2003 single by Keane

Single by Keane
- B-side: "Bedshaped"; "The Way You Want It"
- Released: 12 May 2003
- Length: 3:32
- Label: Fierce Panda
- Songwriters: Tim Rice-Oxley; Tom Chaplin; Richard Hughes
- Producer: Andy Green

Keane singles chronology
"Wolf at the Door" (2001)	"Everybody's Changing" (2003)	"This Is the Last Time" (2003)

Music video
- "Everybody's Changing" on YouTube

"Everybody's Changing" is a song performed by English alternative rock band Keane. It was released as the second single from their debut studio album, Hopes and Fears (2004). After a single release on Fierce Panda in May 2003, which peaked at number 122 in the UK Singles Chart, it was re-released on Island on 3 May 2004 after the success of "Somewhere Only We Know" and reached number four. It is also used in the TV series, In Plain Sight and can also be heard in the final moments of One Tree Hill episode "Truth Doesn't Make a Noise" and Scrubs episode "My Day at the Races".

In August 2006, the song was rated No. 79 from the top 100 greatest songs of all time by The Sun. That same year, English singer Lily Allen recorded a cover of the song, released on her single "Littlest Things" (a version later appeared on the 2007 compilation album, The Saturday Sessions: The Dermot O'Leary Show).

== Composition and recording ==
"Everybody's Changing" was composed in 2001 by Tim Rice-Oxley, just after guitarist Dominic Scott had left the band.

Recording took place at the Helioscentric Studios, Rye, East Sussex. The version appearing on the Fierce Panda release was a home-recorded song, supposedly recorded in a single room.

"Everybody's Changing" uses similar instrumentation as is used throughout Hopes and Fears. The style of "Everybody's Changing" has been described as "piano rock", a style of rock in which the piano is the main instrument instead of the guitar. Throughout the song, a synthesizer is played in the background.

== Meaning ==
The song is about trying to work out where you are in the world, while some of the people around you are going off and doing different things. Tim wrote it while we were really struggling to get anywhere as a band, and we were watching all our friends move away and get on with their lives, while we were stuck in Battle getting nowhere, and wondering if we were doing the right thing

== Fierce Panda single ==
The Fierce Panda release of "Everybody's Changing" was both Keane's first commercial release, and their first release after the departure of guitarist Dominic Scott.

The release arose as a result of Simon Williams attending a Keane gig at London's Betsey Trotwood in December 2002, and liking what he heard so much that he immediately offered to put out a single for the band.

Legend has it that when recording the song for this release, the band recorded it in a back room of the house of Tim Rice-Oxley's parents, on borrowed equipment – which broke, thus meaning the band had to go to another house in order to mix it.

It went on to be selected by Steve Lamacq as his single of the week on Radio 1 on 19 April 2003. This in large part led to the bidding war surrounding the band that led to them being signed to Island.

The CD single was released on 12 May 2003. During the first week 733 copies of the 1500 released were sold, reaching No. 122 in the UK Singles Chart. However, this release was so limited that nowadays copies can be expected to sell on eBay in the region of £90.

The cover art, designed by Alex Lake, represents Tom Chaplin's shadow filled with the photography of two boats. The typeface used in the cover is different from that used in both the Hopes and Fears and the Under the Iron Sea publicity campaigns.

== Island single ==
"Everybody's Changing" (2004 version)

Single by Keane

from the album Hopes and Fears
- B-side: "Fly to Me"; "To the End of the Earth"
- Released: 3 May 2004
- Studio: Helioscentric (Rye, East Sussex)
- Length: 3:36
- Label: Island
- Songwriters: Tim Rice-Oxley; Tom Chaplin; Richard Hughes
- Producer: Andy Green

Keane singles chronology
"Somewhere Only We Know" (2004)	"Everybody's Changing" (2004 version) (2004)	"Bedshaped" (2004)

The 2004 version of "Everybody's Changing", re-recorded during the Heliocentric sessions of winter 2003, is Keane's second major-label release during the Hopes and Fears campaign.

The single was released on 3 May 2004, a week before the album, and it reached number four on the UK Singles Chart, selling about 25,000 copies. The song also reached the top 10 in Denmark, France and Italy; it is the band's highest-charting song in all three countries. There were also pocket CDs with two songs and polyphonic ringtones, as well as alternative versions for France, the Netherlands and Germany.

The enhanced CD includes the UK videoclip and wallpapers. This single was only released in Europe and Australia.

== Music videos ==
There are three videos for this song.

=== International version ===
Keane are playing in a white room, and proceed to change into other persons. Most of the persons they change into are easily recognizable archetypes from cultures around the world. These include a Japanese geisha, a doctor in a white lab coat, a British policewoman, a Ballet dancer (Rice-Oxley), a basketball player, a Girl Guide, an Inuk man, a military soldier (Hughes), a homeless man, a female bodybuilder, an Aboriginal Australian tribesman and a young female gymnast (Chaplin).

=== United States version ===
Keane appear on a scene representing a sunset – their performance is broken up with clips of gigs in London, Mexico City and United States.

== Track listings ==
Fierce Panda CD single Catalogue number: NING133CD
No.	Title	Length
1.	"Everybody's Changing"	3:33
2.	"Bedshaped"	4:38
3.	"The Way You Want It"	3:16

Island CD single Catalogue number: CID855
No.	Title	Length
1.	"Everybody's Changing"	3:35
2.	"To the End of the Earth"
3.	"Fly to Me"	5:32
4.	"Everybody's Changing - Video"

UK 7" vinyl Catalogue number: IS855, UK 3" CD Catalogue number: CIDP855, Dutch CD single
No.	Title	Length
1.	"Everybody's Changing"	3:35
2.	"Fly To Me"	5:32

French CD single
No.	Title	Length
1.	"Everybody's Changing"	3:35
2.	"Somewhere Only We Know" ((Live) (Forum, London, 10 May 2004))

== B-sides ==
=== "Bedshaped" ===
Originally appeared on Fierce Panda release only. See "Bedshaped" main page for composition details.

=== "The Way You Want It" ===
An acoustic piano track that appears only on the Fierce Panda single. It also appears on Strangers, though is not credited. It was played live during late 2003

"The Way You Want It" is definitely a white-album influenced...

=== "Fly to Me" ===
Widely considered a fan favourite, but to date has never fully been played live. The chorus has been performed during some shows of the 2007 Under The Iron Sea arena tour, with the arena name put into it.

The song was first recorded as a quick demo including a solo of a melodica Tim Rice-Oxley bought in Vienna when Keane were supporting Starsailor. The demo included a simple drum pattern and Rice-Oxley providing both lead and backing vocals. At that time, the lyrics did not yet include the second verse (As much as I want you [...] you need a friend) of the eventual version. Instead, the first verse was repeated.

When the band decided to use the song as a B-side for Everybody's Changing, they went into the old Island Studios in St Peter's Square to record vocals and real drums. Steve Winwood's Hammond organ was in the studio, which the band added to the recording. Because the allotted studio time was rapidly running out, Rice-Oxley had to hurry finishing the lyrics. With hardly any time left, all the rough vocals and backing vocals from the demo were added to double-track Tom Chaplin's vocal in the choruses, creating a haunting vocal sound. According to Rice-Oxley, this specific sound is "one of the things that makes the song so atmospheric and moving".

"Fly To Me is possibly my favourite Keane song. Maybe that's just because it still feels quite secret and stuff, I don't know. But I was listening to it on a ferry the other day and it really brought a tear to me eye. I don't even know why.... I think it just captures a feeling of missing people and wondering why life can't just be a bit simpler sometimes. Reminds me of the song "So Far Away" by Carole King." – Tim Rice Oxley

During an interview for a fanzine, Margaret Rice-Oxley (Tim's mother) is quoted as saying that she and Tim's father cried the first time they heard this song.

Official sheet music for this song is available in the Wise Publication book of Hopes and Fears.

=== "To the End of the Earth" ===
Composed by Tim Rice-Oxley and Dominic Scott in 2000. The song was originally composed on guitar, and a regular feature of live gigs before Scott's departure. This version was posted by the band on their website in early 2001 so fans could hear it – this version is still in circulation on the net.

After Scott's departure, Rice-Oxley recomposed the song for the piano. It was re-recorded for the CD single. It is one of only three songs from the pre-Hopes and Fears era to survive the transition from the "guitar" Keane to "piano" Keane – the other songs being "She Has No Time" and "Allemande".

== Soundtrack usage ==
This song was featured in the NBC sitcom Scrubs in the fifth-season episode "My Day at the Races." It was also used in Flight 29 Down in "See Ya." An instrumental version of it was used as background music for a Telekom Malaysia advertisement announcing its rebranding as 'TM' in 2005. The song was also used in the promos for the second season of In Plain Sight. The song was featured in the second-season episode "Truth Doesn't Make a Noise" of the TV series One Tree Hill and also appears on its first soundtrack, One Tree Hill – Music from the WB Television Series, Vol. 1.

On 13 April 2010, at the launch of the United Kingdom's Conservative Party election manifesto, the song was used by the party despite not having sought permission from the band for its use. Band member Richard Hughes later stated on Twitter that he was "horrified" to hear the song being played, and said he would not vote for them.

An instrumental version of it was also used as opening theme for TV3's Mahligai Cinta (lit. Mahligai Love) from 2011 to 2019

== Charts ==
=== Weekly charts ===
Chart (2004–2006)	Peak position
Australia (ARIA)	85
Belgium (Ultratip Bubbling Under Flanders)	2
Belgium (Ultratop 50 Wallonia)	20
Denmark (Tracklisten)	7
Europe (Eurochart Hot 100)	14
France (SNEP)	10
Germany (GfK)	60
Greece (IFPI)	11
Hungary (Rádiós Top 40)	27
Ireland (IRMA)	27
Italy (FIMI)	2
Netherlands (Dutch Top 40)	18
Netherlands (Single Top 100)	20
New Zealand (Recorded Music NZ)	28
Norway (VG-lista)	18
Scottish Singles Sales (Official Charts)	2
Sweden (Sverigetopplistan)	35
Switzerland (Schweizer Hitparade)	24
UK Singles (Official Charts)	4
US Adult Alternative Airplay (Billboard)	6
US Adult Pop Airplay (Billboard)	33

Chart (2022)	Peak position
Romania Airplay (UPFR)	1

=== Year-end charts ===
Chart (2004)	Position
Italy (FIMI)	40
UK Singles (OCC)	112

Chart (2005)	Position
France (SNEP)	57
US Adult Top 40 (Billboard)	98
US Triple-A (Billboard)	19

Year-end chart performance
Chart (2025)	Position
Argentina Anglo Airplay (Monitor Latino)	87

== Certifications ==
Region	Certification	Certified units/sales
Brazil (Pro-Música Brasil)	Gold	30,000^{‡}
Denmark (IFPI Danmark)	Gold	45,000^{‡}
Italy (FIMI)	Platinum	100,000^{‡}
New Zealand (RMNZ)	Platinum	30,000^{‡}
Spain (Promusicae)	Platinum	60,000^{‡}
United Kingdom (BPI)	Platinum	600,000^{‡}
^{‡} Sales+streaming figures based on certification alone.

== Release history ==
Region	Version	Date	Format(s)	Label(s)	Ref(s).
United Kingdom	Original	12 May 2003	—N/a	Fierce Panda	
United Kingdom	2004	3 May 2004	7-inch vinyl; CD	Island	
United States	2004	22 February 2005	Triple A; alternative radio	Interscope	
