= Keane (band) =

English alternative rock band

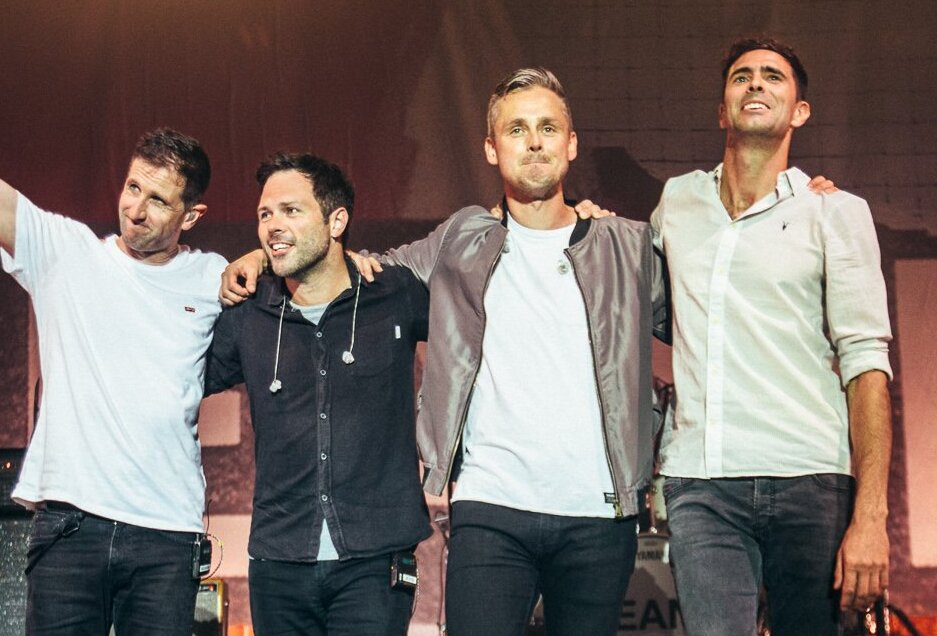
- Keane performing at Cornbury Festival in 2019

Background information
- Origin: Battle, East Sussex, England
- Genres: Alternative rock; rock; post-Britpop; soft rock; indie rock
- Years active: 1995–2014; 2018–present
- Labels: Island; Interscope; Fierce Panda
- Spinoffs: Mt. Desolation; Jesse Quin & The Mets
- Members: Tom Chaplin; Richard Hughes; Tim Rice-Oxley; Jesse Quin
- Past members: Dominic Scott
- Website: keanemusic.com

Keane are an English alternative rock band formed in Battle, East Sussex, in 1995. The band comprises Tom Chaplin (lead vocals, guitar, piano), Tim Rice-Oxley (piano, synthesisers, bass guitar, backing vocals), Richard Hughes (drums, percussion, backing vocals) and Jesse Quin (bass guitar, guitar, backing vocals). Their original line-up included guitarist Dominic Scott, who left in 2001.

Keane have sold over 13 million records worldwide. They first achieved mainstream international success with the release of their debut album, Hopes and Fears, in 2004. Topping the UK Albums Chart, the album won the 2005 Brit Award for Best British Album and was the UK's second-best-selling album of 2004. It is one of the best-selling albums in UK chart history. Their second album, Under the Iron Sea (2006), topped the UK chart and debuted at number four on the US Billboard 200. They released their third album, Perfect Symmetry, in 2008, and followed it with the 2010 EP Night Train. Their fourth studio album, Strangeland, was released in 2012 and peaked at number one in the UK.

The band went on hiatus after the release of their compilation album The Best of Keane (2013). They returned in 2019 with "The Way I Feel", the lead single from their fifth studio album, Cause and Effect (2019). The band then embarked on the Cause and Effect Tour, visiting Europe and Latin America, before the remainder of the tour was postponed due to the COVID-19 pandemic.

Keane were remarkable for using keyboards as their lead instrument instead of guitar, unlike most contemporaneous rock bands. They used a distorted piano effect from 2006, and synthesisers were a common feature of their music on their second and third albums. In May 2008, both Hopes and Fears (number 13) and Under the Iron Sea (number 8) were voted by readers of Q magazine as among the best British albums ever. In 2009, Hopes and Fears was listed as the ninth best-selling album of the 2000s decade in the UK.

== History ==
=== 1995–99: Early years and formation ===
Tom Chaplin and Tim Rice-Oxley became friends at an early age. Chaplin's father David was the headmaster of Vinehall School in Robertsbridge, East Sussex (owned by Chaplin's family) for 25 years, the school all three attended until the age of 13. They later attended Tonbridge School in Kent, where Rice-Oxley met Dominic Scott; both discovered their liking for music. Richard Hughes, Keane's future drummer, also attended Tonbridge. Chaplin had learned to play the flute, but none considered music as a proper career at the time.

In 1995, while studying at University College London, Rice-Oxley formed a rock band with Scott and invited Hughes to play drums. The band, named Lotus Eaters, started by playing covers of songs by the members' favourite bands. After listening to Rice-Oxley's piano playing during a weekend at Virginia Water, Surrey, in 1997, Chris Martin invited him to join his newly formed band Coldplay, but Rice-Oxley declined because he did not want to leave The Lotus Eaters. He stated "I was seriously interested, but Keane were already operational and Coldplay's keyboard player idea was dropped." However, because of Martin's offer, and despite the opposition of Hughes and Scott, Chaplin joined the band in 1997 to take Rice-Oxley's place as vocalist, and also to be an acoustic guitarist. Chaplin's entry led to a change of the band's name, from the Lotus Eaters to Cherry Keane, which was the name of a friend of Chaplin's mother, whom Rice-Oxley and Chaplin knew when they were young, who had left money for Chaplin's family after her death from cancer. Chaplin commented: "I used some of the money to see me through the harder times with the music." The name was shortened to Keane soon afterward.

Chaplin departed for South Africa in Summer 1997 to work as a volunteer during his gap year. Chaplin's early experiences there were later reflected in the band's position for the Make Poverty History campaign. Returning a year later, in July 1998, following a meeting with friend David Lloyd Seaman, Hughes' first words when the band picked up Chaplin at the airport were "we've got a gig in 10 days." With original material, Keane made their debut live appearance at the Hope & Anchor pub on 13 July 1998. In this same year, Chaplin went to Edinburgh University to study for a degree in art history which he later quit to move to London to pursue a full-time music career. After their debut performance, the band went touring London's pub circuit throughout 1998 and 1999.

=== 1999–2003: Early releases and Scott's departure ===
In late 1999, and without a record deal, Keane recorded their first promotional single "Call Me What You Like". Released on CD format through Keane's label Zoomorphic, it was sold after live performances at the pubs where Keane used to play in early 2000. Only 500 copies were printed. The EP was reviewed by Bec Rodwell from eFestivals who listed "Closer Now" as the best song of the record. Recording for the band's next release began on 28 October 2000. At the start of 2001, Rice-Oxley and Hughes disclosed that the main recording would be "Wolf at the Door," and that it would be completed soon. The band gave progress updates. Hughes recorded drums in late January, and the final recording session was in February. Mixing took place in April. The single was released in June, and only 50 copies are known to have been made, using unlabeled CD-Rs.

Both singles are considered highly valuable collector's items by fans. In particular, "Wolf at the Door" has been known to be sold for over £1000 on eBay. During production of "Wolf at the Door," the band recorded and released other songs as demos, namely "More Matey," "Maps," "To the End of the Earth," "Allemande," "New One," "Russian Farmer's Song," and "Live in Fear." The band have declared they are not against fans sharing tracks unreleased on CD, such as the demos "More Matey" and "Emily". Chaplin said "They most likely see those recordings as an interesting extra to get hold of— I don't see it causing any damage. If it was the album we have coming out [(Hopes and Fears)] leaked early, then I'd probably feel differently."

Dominic Scott decided to leave the band in July, a month after "Wolf at the Door" was released, to continue his studies at the LSE. Rice-Oxley referenced this departure in "This Is the Last Time," which was being rehearsed in May, according to Hughes. Keane was invited by record producer James Sanger in July to his property in Normandy, France, where the band recorded a number of tracks from August to November, including "Sunshine," "This Is the Last Time," "Maps" (anew) and "Happy Soldier." It was during these sessions that the idea of using a piano as lead instrument began to emerge. Sanger received a shared credit for four songs that appeared on Keane's debut album, Hopes and Fears, including "Sunshine", the only song composed there. The band members returned to England in November.

The band signed with BMG to publish their music in April 2002, and this enabled them to better commit to music, but at this time they did not yet have a recording contract. Sometime in early 2002, Rice-Oxley wrote "Everybody's Changing." He played it for Chaplin, Hughes and people at BMG, and then the band developed the song into a demo completed in July. They also produced a demo of "Walnut Tree" completed in May. 2002 was a hard year for Keane. All recording or live performances were stopped, and Scott's feeling of going nowhere was starting to tell on Rice-Oxley and Chaplin. In December, Keane returned to performing live. One gig at the Betsey Trotwood in London was attended by Simon Williams of Fierce Panda Records, the same man who had discovered Coldplay years previously. Williams offered to release the first commercial single by the band. This release was "Everybody's Changing", which Steve Lamacq named single of the week on Lamacq Live on 14 April 2003, and came out as a CD single on 12 May. As a result of the attention created by this release and because of the strong live reputation they had built through constant UK touring, a bidding war for the band ensued among major record labels. The band decided to sign with Island Records in summer 2003. After first being attracted to the band by the considerable industry buzz then surrounding them and from hearing "Everybody's Changing" on the radio, the Island A&R, Ferdy Unger-Hamilton, told HitQuarters that he wanted to sign them after hearing the five songs "Everybody’s Changing", "This Is the Last Time", "She Has No Time", "Bend and Break" and "Somewhere Only We Know", saying "every one of them was brilliant...they had a fantastic live show [but] even if I hadn't been able to see them live, I would have tried to sign them anyway." According to Unger-Hamilton, Keane chose to sign with Island because they got on well with the A&R and were convinced that he did not want to change them in any way.

The band released "This Is the Last Time" on Fierce Panda, in October 2003 as the final release on that label.

=== 2004–05: Hopes and Fears and breakthrough ===
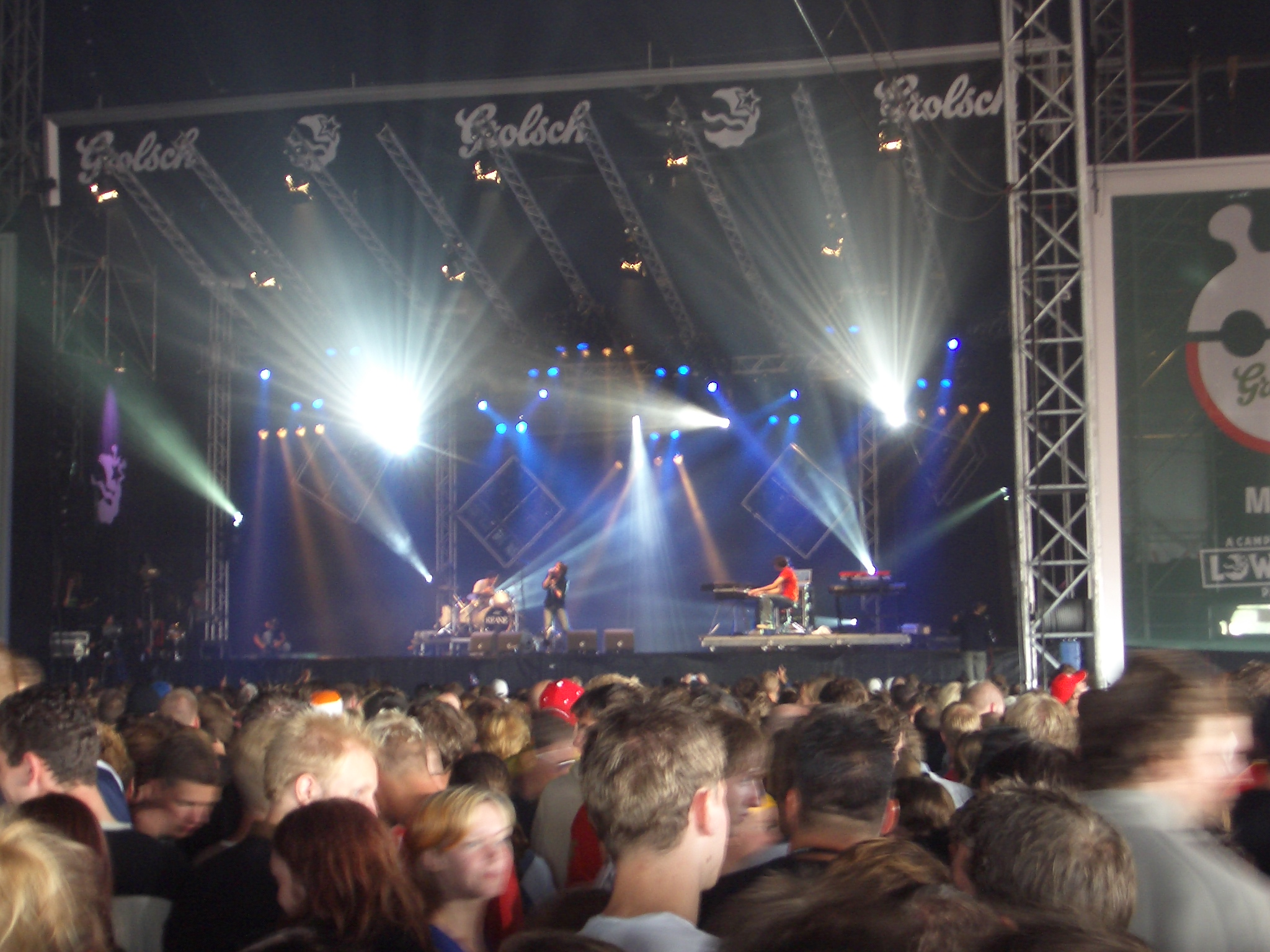
Keane performing at the Lowlands Festival, 2004

With the release of their first major single, Keane began to achieve recognition in the United Kingdom and the United States. In January 2004, Keane was named the band most likely to achieve success in the coming year in the BBC's Sound of 2004 poll; additionally, this year is popularly referred to as one of the best years for new British music. A month later, Keane's first release on Island was "Somewhere Only We Know", which reached number three on the UK Singles Chart in February 2004. On 4 May, a re-release of "Everybody's Changing" followed and featured new B-sides and a new cover; it reached number four on the UK Singles Chart.

Keane's debut album, Hopes and Fears, was released on 10 May 2004 in the UK, a day before the band started their first world tour. It debuted at number one on the UK Albums Chart and became the second best-selling British album of the year. It has been certified 9× platinum in the UK. Drowned in Sound gave it 5 out of 10, accusing Keane of excessively imitating Coldplay (specifically comparing "Your Eyes Open" and "On a Day Like Today" with, respectively, "Daylight" and "Politik" on the band's album A Rush of Blood to the Head), criticising the album as being "stylistically all over the place" and its lyrics as being "immature" and "cringe-worthy". However, it gave credit to the album's "fine moments", praising lead single "Somewhere Only We Know" as "breathtaking".

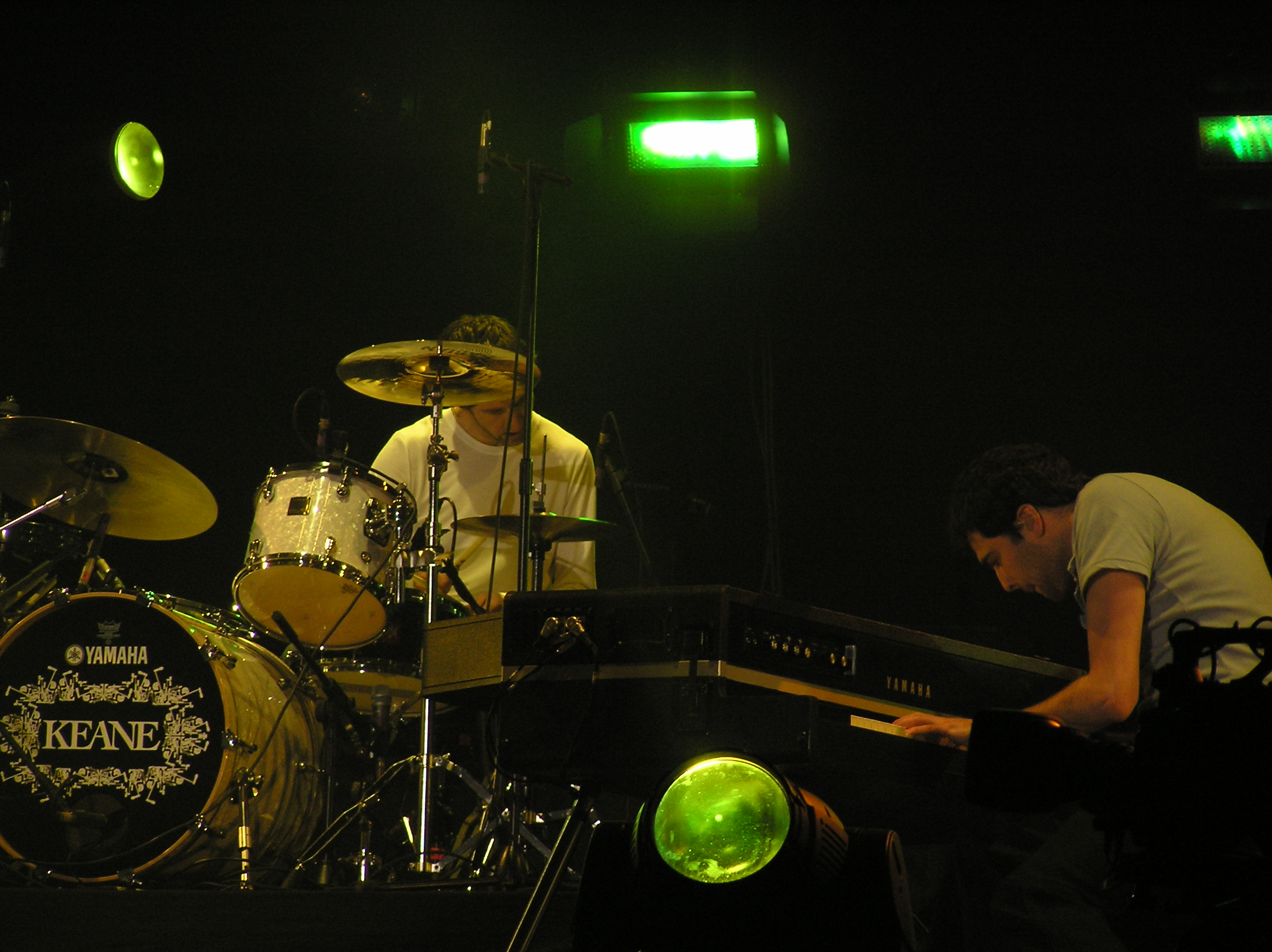
Keane performing in 2005

The album has sold approximately 5.5 million copies worldwide. In the UK, it stayed in the top 75 of the UK Albums Chart for 72 weeks, appearing again on its 115th week. Post-release, the band released singles from the album "Bedshaped," "This Is the Last Time" (a version with Island Records) and "Bend and Break" on 16 August, 22 November, and 25 July 2005, respectively. The band won two awards at the 2005 BRIT Awards in February; Best British album for Hopes and Fears, and the British breakthrough act award as voted for by listeners of BBC Radio 1. Three months after, Rice-Oxley received the Ivor Novello award for songwriter of the year.

As members of the Make Poverty History, Keane performed "Somewhere Only We Know" and "Bedshaped" at the Live 8 concert, which took place in London on 2 July 2005. Keane are also patrons of War Child, and in September 2005, they recorded a cover version of Elton John's "Goodbye Yellow Brick Road" to the charity album Help: a Day in the Life. Previously, the band had recorded a cover of the Walker Brothers' "The Sun Ain't Gonna Shine Anymore". It also was released as a 7" single as a gift to members of the Keane emailing list. During the year, the band achieved minor recognition in the U.S. from their extensive touring, which culminated with a series of gigs as the opening act for U2. The group were nominated for a Grammy Award in the Best New Artist category along with Sugarland, John Legend, Ciara, and Fall Out Boy.

=== 2006–07: Under the Iron Sea ===
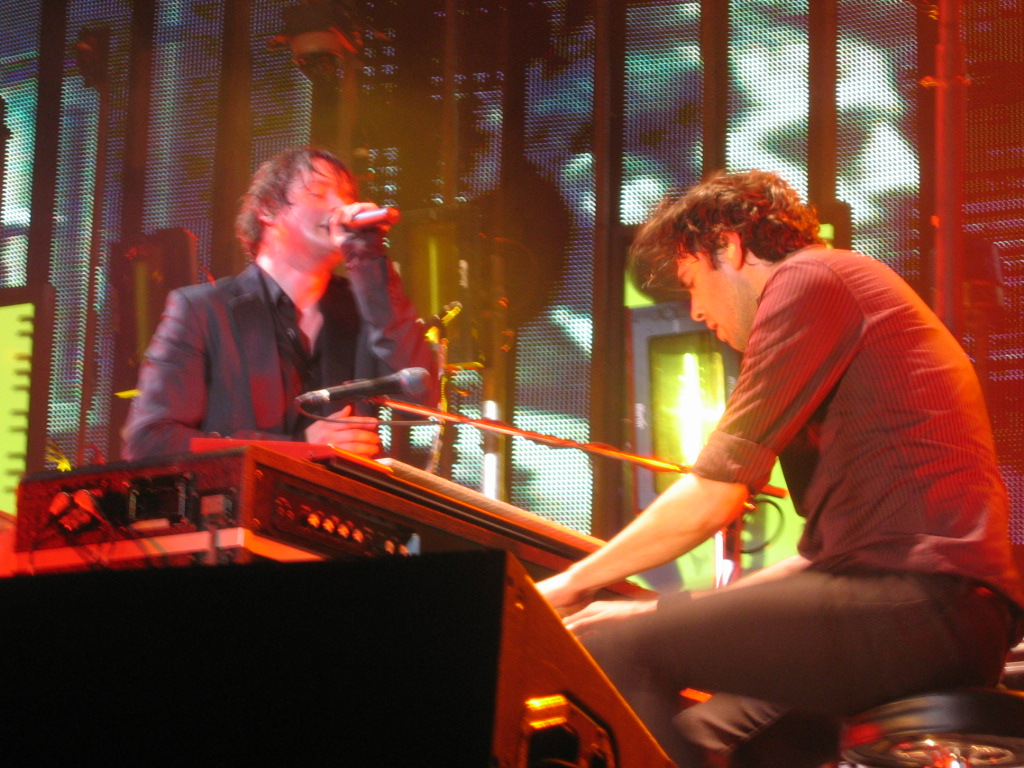
Keane performing in 2007

In April 2005, in the middle of the Hopes and Fears tour, the band began recording Under the Iron Sea with producer Andy Green, who worked with them on Hopes and Fears. The band later recruited Mark "Spike" Stent for mixing duties. Recording took place in Helioscentric Studios, where Hopes and Fears was recorded. Additional recording was done at The Magic Shop in New York City. The album's release was preceded by the release of the "Atlantic", a download-only music video and the lead single "Is It Any Wonder?", which reached number three on the UK Singles Chart. The song was nominated for a Grammy Award for Best Pop Performance by a Duo or Group with Vocals in 2007. The album had a worldwide release in June 2006 and was at number 1 in the UK Albums Chart for the first two weeks of its release. As of 22 May 2007, it had sold more than 2.2 million copies. The third single from the album was "Crystal Ball", released on 21 August 2006, and reached number 20 in the UK Singles Chart. The fourth single from the album was "Nothing in My Way", released on 30 October 2006, which received particular success on Mexican commercial radio, charting on Top 3 on 13 January 2007 and staying a month on that chart. The band released the single "The Night Sky" in aid of the charity War Child.

Before the release of the album (in May 2006), Keane had started their second world tour. However, because of the extensive touring, on 22 August 2006, Chaplin announced he had admitted himself to a clinic for drinking and drug problems. This initially resulted in the cancellation of three gigs and postponement of their September tour. The entire North American tour was cancelled outright to allow continued treatment. As a result, the upcoming UK and European tours, scheduled for October and November 2006, were considered to be liable for possible postponement depending on Chaplin's treatment. Chaplin then left the Priory Clinic in London on 6 October, but he continued to receive treatment. The tour reached for the first time South American countries (Argentina, Chile and Brazil) and saw the band's third visit to Mexico in late April with four dates, playing at the downtown zócalo in Mexico City, as well their first visit to Monterrey and Guadalajara. On 7 July 2007, Keane played at the UK leg of Live Earth at Wembley Stadium, part of a series of gigs similar to Live 8, to highlight the threat of global warming. They performed "Somewhere Only We Know", "Is It Any Wonder?" and "Bedshaped". The Under the Iron Sea tour was brought to an end with performances in Oporto, Portugal, and at the Natural Music Festival in El Ejido, Spain on 3 August and 4 respectively.

In 2008, Under the Iron Sea was voted the 8th best British album of all time by a poll conducted by Q Magazine and HMV. In early October, Concert Live announced they were releasing a limited edition nine-CD set of every Keane live performance in the UK during October 2006 under the name Live 06.

=== 2008–11: Perfect Symmetry and Night Train ===
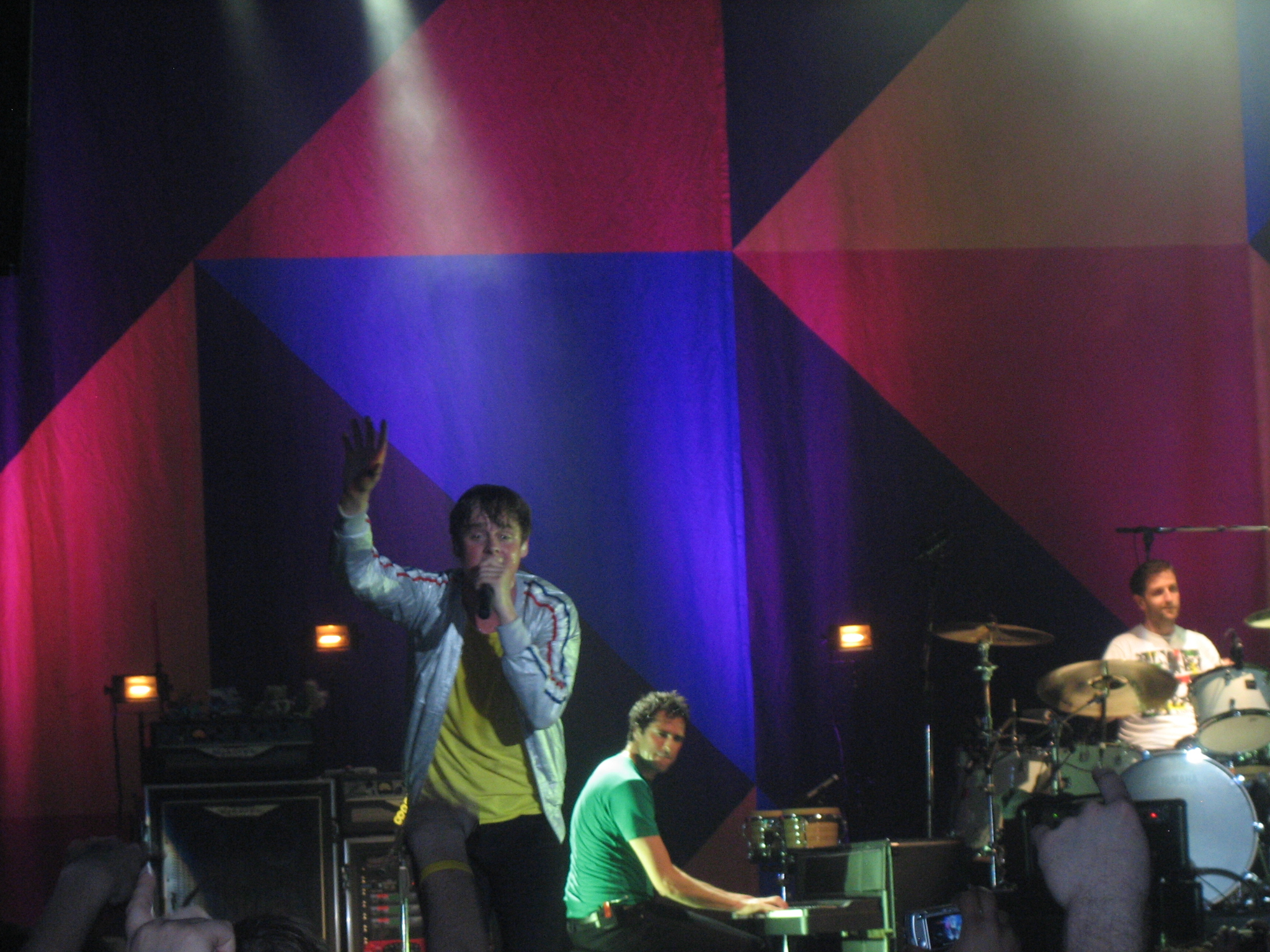
Keane performing in Toronto, Canada, 2009

In a March 2007 video interview, Chaplin and Hughes spoke of wanting to take a more "organic" approach on album three, but played down suggestions about the use of guitars, referring to them as "a fun part of the live set" at present; however, the cover of "She Sells Sanctuary" became the first song recorded since "The Happy Soldier" (2001) to feature the instrument. Photographic updates to the Keane website implied the use of guitars in the album's recording sessions. Jesse Quin joined the band since this album as permanent studio and live member. He plays the bass, percussion, guitar, synths and backing vocals. On 25 August 2008, Keane appeared as studio guests on BBC 6 Music with Steve Lamacq where three of the new songs from Perfect Symmetry were played for the first time: "Spiralling", "The Lovers Are Losing", and "Better Than This".

The album was released on 13 October 2008, and reached number one on the UK Albums Chart on 19 October. It also reached number 7 on the Billboard 200 chart. In December 2008, it was voted "Best Album of the Year" by the readers, listeners and visitors of Q Magazine, Q Radio and Qthemusic.com. The song "Perfect Symmetry" was voted best track. In November 2008, they started the Perfect Symmetry World Tour. On 2 April 2009, Keane became the first band ever to broadcast a live show in 3D. It was filmed at Abbey Road, the site of the world's first satellite broadcast (by the Beatles). Keane fans were prompted to buy 3D glasses along with the new 7" single "Better Than This" or also to hand-make their own glasses.

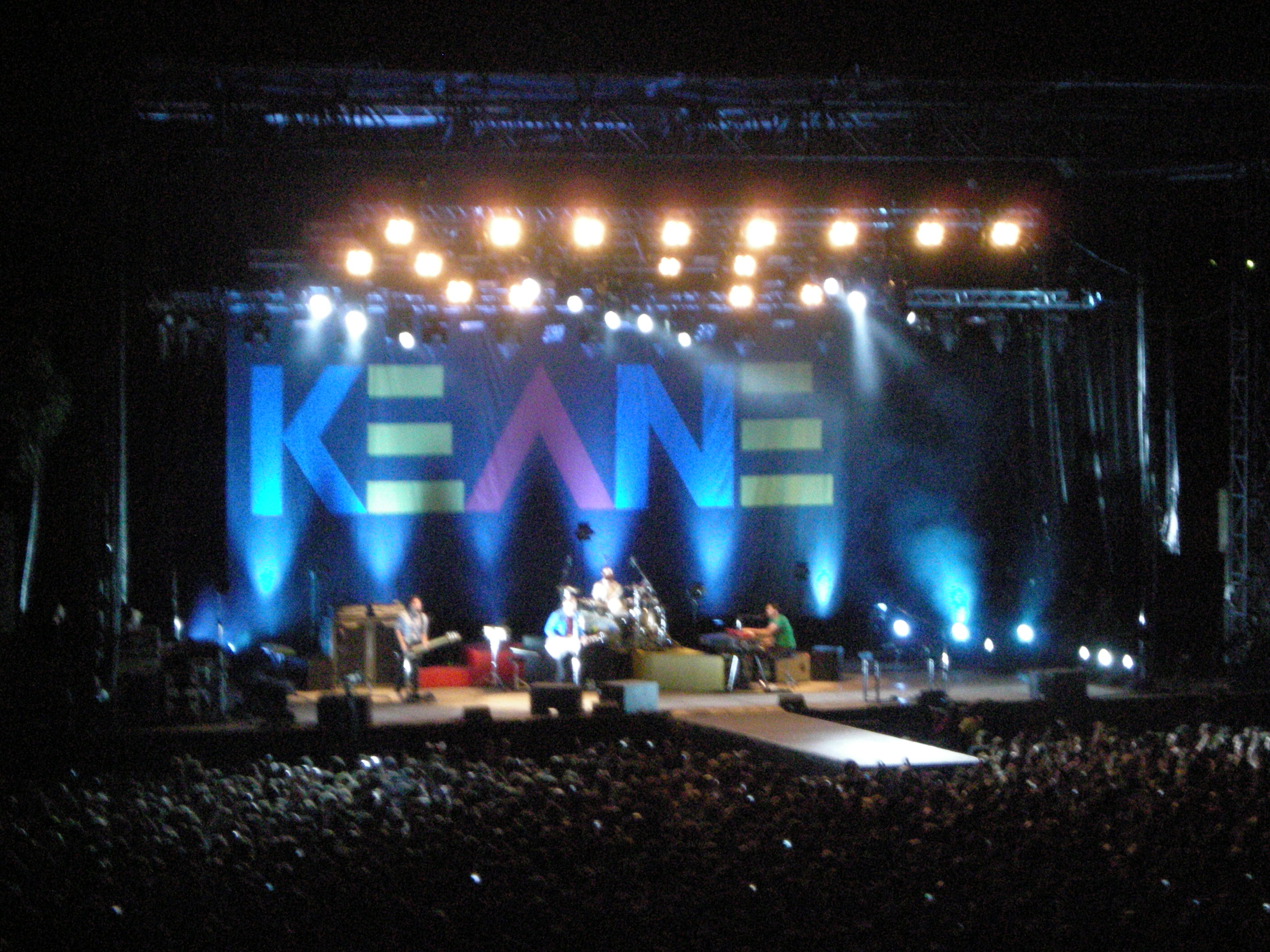
Keane performing during the Perfect Symmetry Tour (2009)

On 10 May 2010, Keane released the EP titled Night Train which, on 16 May became their fourth number 1 album in the UK. Night Train was recorded during the Perfect Symmetry World Tour. The band first named this record as a mini-album, then that changed to an EP. In an interview, Tim Rice-Oxley said that Night Train is "pretty much an album". The songs "Stop for a Minute" and "Looking Back" feature Somali Canadian rapper K'naan. The EP includes a cover of the song "You've Got to Help Yourself" by Yellow Magic Orchestra, featuring vocals by Japanese funk MC Tigarah. The song "Your Love" features Keane's keyboardist Tim Rice-Oxley on lead vocals. The song "My Shadow" was featured in the Season 6 Grey's Anatomy episode "Shiny Happy People". Night Train has been met with mixed reviews from critics. Ryan Brockington of the New York Post's PopWrap called the work "game changing" while writing that the first single "Stop for a Minute" is "just as brilliant" as the album.

Supporting the Night Train EP, the band began on the Night Train Tour, which started with a show in Brixton, London at The Fridge on 12 May 2010. The tour includes a homecoming show at the Bedgebury Pinetum, outside the band's hometown of Battle. Also festival appearances in Europe followed with a tour of North America, concluding with an appearance at the Mile High Festival in Denver.

=== 2011–13: Strangeland ===
After the end of Mt. Desolation Tour (alternative project by Tim and Jesse), Tim Rice-Oxley and Jesse Quin joined the other two members of the band to work on the pre-production of Strangeland. It was announced on 3 February 2011 on the band's official website that Quin had become an official member of the band. He has worked with Keane since 2007. Keane played a concert in Beijing, China on 13 April 2011 at the invitation of the fashion company Burberry. The band performed an acoustic session at the Wall of China. The band finished recording their fourth studio album on 12 January 2012 and finished mixing the record on 10 February. The album was recorded at Tim Rice-Oxley's Sea Fog Studios, in Polegate, East Sussex. The Strangeland Tour started at De La Warr Pavilion in Bexhill-on-Sea, East Sussex on Friday, 9 March 2012.

The band released "Silenced by the Night", the album's lead single, worldwide except for the United Kingdom on 13 March 2012. Keane performed "Silenced By the Night" for the first time on 12 March on Jimmy Kimmel Live!. The song was sent to U.S. adult alternative radio stations on 26 March 2012. In the UK, the single was released on 15 April 2012. The single "Disconnected" was released on 20 April 2012 in Germany, Switzerland and Austria, with the official worldwide release on 8 October 2012. The single "Sovereign Light Café" was released on 23 July 2012. The video was filmed in Bexhill-on-Sea in Sussex, England.

=== 2013–18: The Best of Keane and hiatus ===
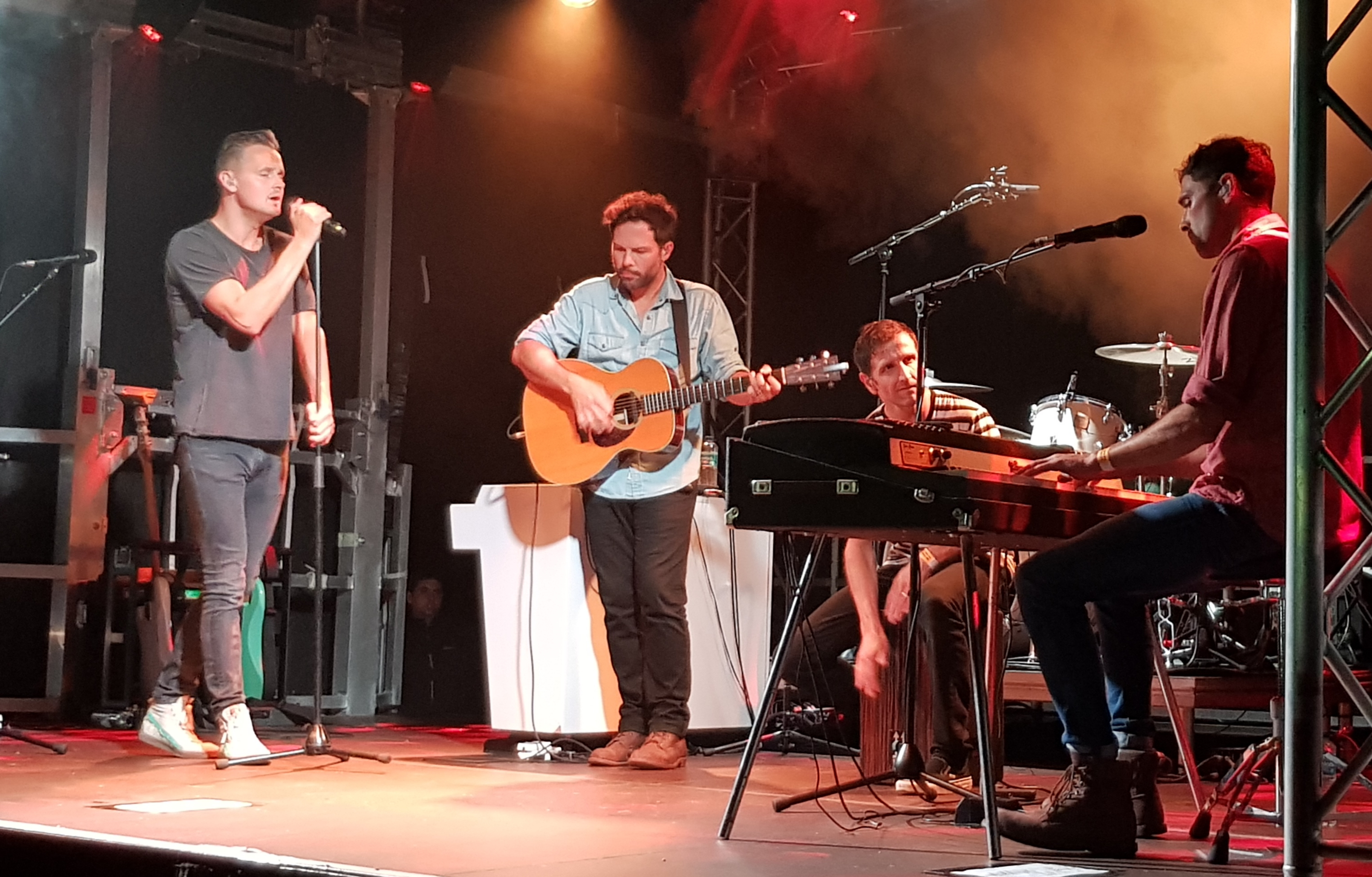
Keane performing in 2018

Keane released the compilation album The Best of Keane in November 2013. Two new songs recorded during Strangeland were released from the compilation album; "Higher Than the Sun" was released on 28 September 2013 and "Won't Be Broken" was released on 20 January 2014.

On 20 October 2013, several publications, including The Sun and Digital Spy, claimed that Keane intended to split following the release of The Best of Keane, and reported that the band members were "taking a break...to pursue their own projects." On 21 October 2013, Tom Chaplin clarified on Real Radio Yorkshire that the band was not splitting up, but the band members would like to "take a bit of time out from being Keane" after being busy for the past few years.

In an interview conducted in late 2017 with a correspondent from The Sun, Tom Chaplin stated that he felt that he was too old to reform and relaunch the band. He recorded a solo album titled The Wave, released on 14 October 2016. He released follow-up Christmas-themed second album, Twelve Tales of Christmas, on 17 November 2017. Rice-Oxley and Quin continued side project Mt. Desolation, releasing the album When the Night Calls on 25 May 2018.

During the band's hiatus, the band reunited three times: on 8 August 2015, Chaplin and Rice-Oxley performed a Keane setlist at Battle Festival. On 11 September 2016, the band released a music video for "Tear Up This Town", written and recorded for the film A Monster Calls.

=== 2019–present: Cause and Effect and Hopes and Fears 20 ===
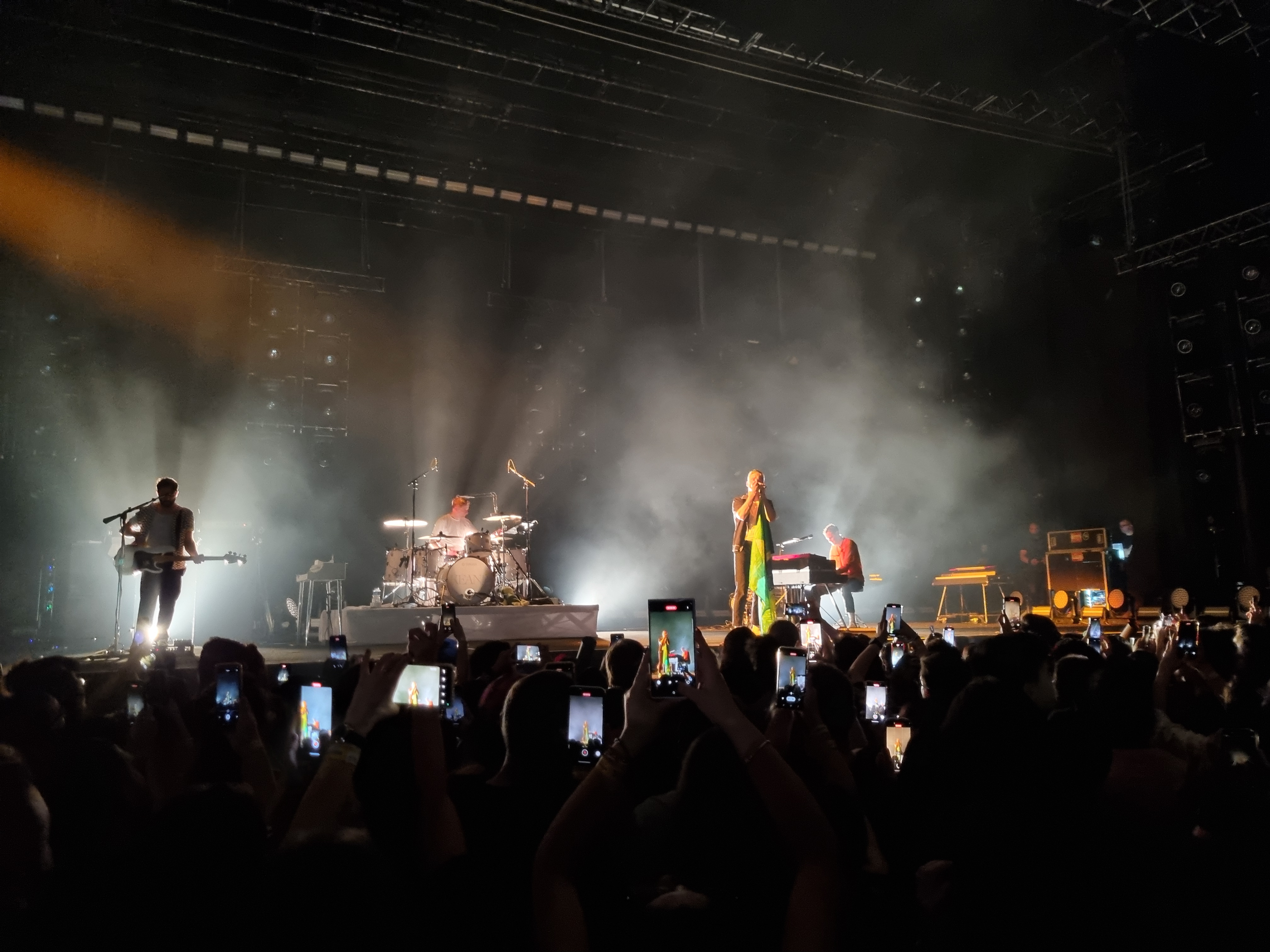
Keane performing in Brazil, 2024

Toward the end of 2018, Keane posted a series of cryptic images onto their various social media accounts, hinting that the quartet were in the studio working on material. On 17 January 2019, an article from The Sun revealed that the band are planning "to make a comeback after six years away" and that a "source close to the rockers has revealed the band is ready to work together again after 'putting their differences to one side'". On 6 February, Keane posted an image of them on their various social media accounts. This was followed by several announcements on their Instagram and Facebook sites of various festivals in which the band would perform, including Cornbury Music Festival (6 July 2019), 4ever Valencia Fest in Spain (21 July 2019), MEO Marés Vivas in Portugal (19 July 2019), Noches del Botánico in Madrid (20 July 2019), and Hello Festival in The Netherlands (9 June). On 15 March 2019, Keane performed their song "Somewhere Only We Know" on Comic Relief's Red Nose Day on BBC One with London Contemporary Voices. On 26 March 2019, Keane posted "We’ve been desperate to tell you that we’re busy making another album, which we’ll be releasing later this year" to their Facebook page.

On 17 May 2019, Keane released an EP titled Retroactive EP1 featuring "our favourite archived live performances, older demos and random treasures". On 6 June 2019, the band released the first new single from Cause and Effect, titled "The Way I Feel". On 16 June 2019, Keane performed a set at the Isle of Wight Festival, being the closing act of the event. On 8 August 2019, the second single, "Love Too Much", was released for streaming and debuted on The Breakfast Show on BBC Radio 2. Neil Z. Yeung of AllMusic gave the album a positive review, writing "Not a game-changing comeback by any means, Cause and Effect is instead a satisfying return to form that manages to gracefully age Keane by invigorating a familiar formula with wisdom and honesty learned over a dramatic, life-changing decade." On 9 April 2021, Keane announced on their social media platforms they would be participating in Record Store Day 2021 Drop 2 on 17 July, with the special early release of their Dirt EP on 12" vinyl, featuring four previously unreleased tracks from the Cause and Effect sessions. On 17 July, the video for the EP's title track was released onto YouTube and Apple Music, coinciding with the limited early release of the 12" vinyl of the EP for Record Store Day. This came with the announcement that the full release of the EP would take place on 13 August 2021. The band played a handful of shows that same year, including an appearance at that year's TRNSMT Festival in Glasgow.

The band undertook a brief tour of the UK in June and July 2022, including a performance at Belgium's Rock Werchter festival and Delamere Forest in Cheshire, UK. Later that year, Chaplin released his third studio album, Midpoint, in September 2022. In an interview with Retro Pop magazine, Chaplin said that people "keep asking" him about Keane and whether they will make another record. "I don't know," he said in response. "I will just see how I feel."

In September 2023, the band announced they would undertake a tour of the UK, Europe and America in 2024 to commemorate the 20th anniversary of Hopes and Fears. The tour commenced in May, coinciding with the album's reissue, and continued on until December of that year.

== Collaborations ==
In November 2004, Keane collaborated with electronic DJ Faultline on a cover of the Elton John song "Goodbye Yellow Brick Road". Two years later, Rice-Oxley collaborated with Gwen Stefani as a co-writer of the song "Early Winter", released later in 2007 as a single, from her album The Sweet Escape. Stefani had been wishing to work with the band since 2005, and Rice-Oxley responded by saying "we might give it a go". Tom Chaplin collaborated with Rocco Deluca and the Burden on the song "Mercy". The band collaborated with Somali-Canadian rapper K'naan and Japanese Baile Funk singer Tigarah on the EP Night Train. In late 2009, Rice-Oxley collaborated with the Australian singer Kylie Minogue as co-writer of the song "Everything Is Beautiful", for Minogue's eleventh studio album, Aphrodite, released in June 2010. The band collaborated with dance artist Chicane on a remix of the song "Bend & Break", renamed "Wake Up". It was featured on the artist's 2008 best-of compilation. In 2012, Tom Chaplin collaborated with the Dutch singer Laura Jansen on the song "Same Heart" for a Dutch charity radio programme. The track was featured on Jansen's second studio album, Elba. In 2017, a version of Tom Chaplin's solo track "Solid Gold", featuring alternative pop singer JONES, was released as a single.

== Musical style and themes ==
Tim Rice-Oxley and Dominic Scott were the main writers of the band's songs during their early years. When Scott left in 2001, Rice-Oxley became the main composer. However, Rice-Oxley credits the rest of the band on all compositions, so that royalties for song credits are shared.

Keane usually harbours an ample, reverberated, melodic, slow- to mid-tempo fully orchestrated sound, somehow reminiscent of Elton John's early and middle career, and their more introspective songs have brought comparisons to Suede and Jeff Buckley. The band incorporated electronic textures on Perfect Symmetry (2008), which was likened to Orchestral Manoeuvres in the Dark (OMD) and Midge Ure.

While guitars have been (minimally) present even in their early work, their appearance in the final mix has always been slight, and while Chaplin has stepped up as an almost full-time guitarist in the band, that instrument is never featured as prominently as to be more than barely noticed. For this matter, they have been dubbed as "the band with no guitars", thanks to their heavily piano-based sound. By using delay and distortion effects on their pianos and similar keyboards, they often create sounds that aren't immediately recognisable as piano. Rice-Oxley said during an interview in Los Angeles that they tend to think piano-related music is boring and what they really wanted to do was try something different. He referred to the piano as an odd instrument to form part of a rock band instrumentation, comparing it to the Beatles' set of instruments. Rice-Oxley's distortion piano has been key to most of Keane's multifaceted style and is most definitely their most recognizable asset.

Keane have covered songs by artists such as U2, Rufus Wainwright, Depeche Mode, Genesis, the Beatles, the Cult and Queen. Rice-Oxley said "I guess it's classic song writing that is the main influence rather than one band in particular – we love people like Nick Drake who can convey so much emotion and write songs and albums that will be loved and cherished for many years – the things that will be in people's record collections for their whole lives."

== Members ==
Current members

- Tim Rice-Oxley – keyboards (1995–2014, 2018–present), guitar (2008–2011), bass (1995–2007), backing vocals (1997–2014, 2018–present), lead vocals (1995–1997)
- Richard Hughes – drums, percussion (1995–2014, 2018–present), backing vocals (2006–2014, 2018–present)
- Tom Chaplin – lead vocals (1997–2014, 2018–present), guitar (1997–2001, 2006–2011, 2022–present), keyboards (2006–2008)
- Jesse Quin – bass, backing vocals, guitar, keyboards (2011–2014, 2018–present; touring/session musician 2007–2011)

Former members

- Dominic Scott – guitar, backing vocals (1995–2001)

Timeline

== Discography ==
- Hopes and Fears (2004)
- Under the Iron Sea (2006)
- Perfect Symmetry (2008)
- Strangeland (2012)
- Cause and Effect (2019)

== Concert tours ==
- Hopes and Fears Tour (2004–05)
- Under the Iron Sea Tour (2006–2007)
- Perfect Symmetry World Tour (2008–2009)
- Night Train Tour (2010)
- Strangeland Tour (2012–2013)
- Cause and Effect Tour (2019–2020)
- Keane20 World Tour (2024)

== See also ==
- Live Earth
- Make Poverty History
