= Strangeland Tour =

2012–13 concert tour by Keane

- Tour by Keane
- Associated album: Strangeland
- Start date: 9 March 2012
- End date: 25 August 2013
- Legs: 9
- No. of shows: 69 in Europe; 36 in North America; 7 in South America; 9 in Asia; 121 Total

Keane concert chronology
- Night Train Tour (2010); Strangeland Tour (2012–13); Cause and Effect Tour (2019)

The Strangeland Tour was the fifth tour performed by the British Band Keane, to support the launch of their fourth studio album Strangeland.

== Opening acts ==
- Mystery Jets (North America—Leg 1)
- Youngblood Hawke (North America—Leg 2)
- Wolf Gang (Europe—Leg 2, select dates)
- Zulu Winter (Europe—Leg 2, select dates)
- Hoodlums (Bexhill-on-Sea)
- Hays (Saint Petersburg)
- Bastille (Paris—15 May 2012)
- Patrick Wilson (Chicago)
- Kiev (Denver, Salt Lake City, Los Angeles—29 June 2012)
- IIRIS (Helsinki, Salacgrīva)
- Civil Twilight (Vancouver)
- AGOP (Paris—17 October 2012)
- Miss Caffeina (Madrid)
- Kieran Leonard (Nottingham)
- Space Bee (Lima)
- We Are The Grand (Santiago—8 April 2013)
- Rayos Laser (Buenos Aires)
- Pablo López (Calella de Palafrugell)
- Laura Mvula (London—25 August 2013)
- Jessica Sweetman (London—25 August 2013)

== Setlist ==
8 April 2013—Teatro La Cúpula—Santiago, Chile
1. "You Are Young"
2. "Bend and Break"
3. "On the Road"
4. "We Might as Well Be Strangers"
5. "Nothing in My Way"
6. "Silenced by the Night"
7. "Everybody's Changing"
8. "Neon River"
9. "Spiralling"
10. "A Bad Dream"
11. "Hamburg Song"
12. "Disconnected"
13. "Is It Any Wonder?"
14. "This Is the Last Time"
15. "Somewhere Only We Know"
16. "Bedshaped"

Encore

17. "Sea Fog"
18. "Sovereign Light Café"
19. "Crystal Ball"
25 August 2013—Kenwood House—London, England
1. "You Are Young"
2. "Bend and Break"
3. "On the Road"
4. "We Might as Well Be Strangers"
5. "Nothing in My Way"
6. "Silenced by the Night"
7. "Everybody's Changing"
8. "Neon River"
9. "A Bad Dream"
10. "Day Will Come"
11. "Spiralling"
12. "Is It Any Wonder?"
13. "Snowed Under"
14. "Hamburg Song"
15. "This Is the Last Time"
16. "Somewhere Only We Know"
17. "Bedshaped"
18. "Sea Fog"
19. "Sovereign Light Café"
20. "Crystal Ball"

== Tour dates ==
| Date | City | Country | Venue |
|---|---|---|---|
Europe
| 9 March 2012 | Bexhill-on-Sea | England | De La Warr Pavilion |
| 10 March 2012 | Bexhill-on-Sea | England | De La Warr Pavilion |
North America
| 16 March 2012^{[A]} | Austin | United States | La Zona Rosa |
| 17 March 2012^{[A]} | Austin | United States | Stubb's BBQ |
Europe
| 4 April 2012 | Moscow | Russia | Клуб Ray Just Arena |
| 6 April 2012 | Saint Petersburg | Russia | Yubileyny Sports Palace |
| 15 May 2012 | Paris | France | Salle Cabaret |
| 23 May 2012 | Newcastle | England | O_{2} Academy Newcastle |
| 24 May 2012 | Glasgow | Scotland | O_{2} Academy Glasgow |
| 25 May 2012 | Birmingham | England | O_{2} Academy Birmingham |
| 27 May 2012^{[B]} | Landgraaf | Netherlands | Megaland Landgraaf |
| 29 May 2012 | Leeds | England | O_{2} Academy Leeds |
| 30 May 2012 | Manchester | England | O_{2} Apollo Manchester |
| 1 June 2012^{[C]} | Nuremberg | Germany | Zeppelinfeld |
| 4 June 2012^{[D]} | Nürburg | Germany | Nürburgring |
| 4 June 2012 | Folkestone | England | Leas Cliff Hall |
| 5 June 2012 | Bristol | England | O_{2} Academy Bristol |
| 6 June 2012 | Leicester | England | De Montfort Hall |
| 8 June 2012 | London | England | O_{2} Academy Brixton |
| 9 June 2012 | London | England | O_{2} Academy Brixton |
North America
| 12 June 2012 | Boston | United States | House of Blues |
| 14 June 2012 | North Bethesda | United States | The Music Center at Strathmore |
| 15 June 2012 | New York City | United States | Beacon Theatre |
| 16 June 2012 | Philadelphia | United States | Merriam Theater |
| 18 June 2012 | Montreal | Canada | Olympia de Montréal |
| 19 June 2012 | Toronto | Canada | Sound Academy |
| 21 June 2012 | Nashville | United States | Marathon Music Works |
| 22 June 2012 | Chicago | United States | Vic Theatre |
| 23 June 2012 | Milwaukee | United States | Pabst Theater |
| 25 June 2012 | Denver | United States | Paramount Theatre |
| 26 June 2012 | Salt Lake City | United States | Gallivan Center |
| 29 June 2012 | Los Angeles | United States | Orpheum Theatre |
| 30 June 2012 | Oakland | United States | Fox Oakland Theatre |
Europe
| 6 July 2012^{[E]} | Hastings | England | Alexandra Park |
| 8 July 2012^{[F]} | Perth and Kinross | Scotland | Balado |
| 14 July 2012^{[G]} | Bilbao | Spain | Kobetamendi |
| 16 July 2012^{[H]} | Cascais | Portugal | Hipódromo Manuel Possolo |
| 18 July 2012 | Helsinki | Finland | Circus Helsinki |
| 20 July 2012^{[I]} | Salacgrīva | Latvia | Zvejnieku Parks |
| 17 August 2012^{[J]} | Kiewit | Belgium | Kempische Steenweg |
| 18 August 2012^{[K]} | Chelmsford | England | Hylands Park |
| 19 August 2012^{[K]} | Weston-under-Lizard | England | Weston Park |
South America
| 23 August 2012 | Asunción | Paraguay | Hipódromo de Asunción |
North America
| 29 August 2012 | Monterrey | Mexico | Arena Monterrey |
| 30 August 2012 | Mexico City | Mexico | Arena Ciudad de México |
| 1 September 2012^{[L]} | Seattle | United States | Fisher Pavilion |
| 3 September 2012 | Vancouver | Canada | The Centre in Vancouver For Performing Arts |
Asia
| 22 September 2012 | Taipei | Taiwan | Taipei Show |
| 24 September 2012 | Seoul | South Korea | SK Olympic Handball Gymnasium |
| 26 September 2012 | Tokyo | Japan | Shibuya-AX |
| 28 September 2012 | Jakarta | Indonesia | Tennis Indoor Senayan |
| 30 September 2012 | Changi | Singapore | Max Pavilion |
| 2 October 2012 | Pasay | Philippines | Mall of Asia Arena |
| 4 October 2012 | Bangkok | Thailand | MoonStar Studios |
| 13 October 2012 | Beirut | Lebanon | Forum de Beyrouth |
Europe
| 15 October 2012 | Offenbach am Main | Germany | Capitol |
| 16 October 2012 | Amsterdam | Netherlands | Heineken Music Hall |
| 17 October 2012 | Paris | France | L'Olympia |
| 19 October 2012 | Madrid | Spain | Sala San Miguel |
| 20 October 2012 | Lisbon | Portugal | Praça de Touros do Campo Pequeno |
| 21 October 2012 | Porto | Portugal | Coliseu do Porto |
| 23 October 2012 | Pamplona | Spain | Sala Principal |
| 24 October 2012 | Barcelona | Spain | Sala Razzmatazz |
| 26 October 2012 | Bologna | Italy | Estragon Club |
| 27 October 012 | Zurich | Switzerland | Hallenstadion |
| 29 October 29, 2012 | Ljubljana | Slovenia | Tivoli Hall |
| 30 October 2012 | Budapest | Hungary | Petőfi Csarnok |
| 31 October 2012 | Vienna | Austria | Bank Austria Gasometer Halle |
| 1 November 2012 | Prague | Czech Republic | Lucerna Music Bar |
| 3 November 2012 | Berlin | Germany | Tempodrom |
| 10 November 2012 | Hamburg | Germany | Docks |
| 12 November 2012 | Stockholm | Sweden | Münchenbryggeriet |
| 13 November 2012 | Oslo | Norway | Sentrum Scene |
| 14 November 2012 | Copenhagen | Denmark | Den Grå Hal |
| 16 November 2012 | Ettelbruck | Luxembourg | Deichhal |
| 17 November 2012 | Brussels | Belgium | Cirque Royal |
| 19 November 19, 2012 | Edinburgh | Scotland | Usher Hall |
| 21 November 2012 | Dublin | Ireland | Olympia Theatre |
| 22 November 2012 | Belfast | Northern Ireland | Waterfront Hall |
| 28 November 2012 | Nottingham | England | Capital FM Arena Nottingham |
| 29 November 2012 | Manchester | England | Manchester Arena |
| 30 November 2012 | London | England | The O_{2} Arena |
| 2 December 2012 | Brighton | England | Brighton Centre |
| 3 December 2012 | Margate | England | Winter Gardens |
| 4 December 2012 | Bournemouth | England | Windsor Hall |
| North America | | England | |
| 8 January 2013 | Portland | United States | McMenamins Crystal Ballroom |
| 9 January 2013 | Boise | United States | Knitting Factory |
| 11 January 2013 | San Francisco | United States | Warfield Theatre |
| 12 January 2013 | Los Angeles | United States | Pantages Theatre |
| 13 January 2013 | San Diego | United States | House of Blues |
| 16 January 2013 | Houston | United States | House of Blues |
| 17 January 2013 | Austin | United States | Moody Theater |
| 18 January 2013 | Dallas | United States | House of Blues |
| 20 January 2013 | Kansas City | United States | The Midland by AMC |
| 21 January 2013 | Minneapolis | United States | First Avenue |
| 23 January 2013 | Nashville | United States | Ryman Auditorium |
| 24 January 2013 | Atlanta | United States | The Tabernacle |
| 26 January 2013 | Columbus | United States | Newport Music Hall |
| 27 January 2013 | Royal Oak | United States | Royal Oak Music Theatre |
| 29 January 2013 | Burlington | United States | Flynn Center for the Performing Arts |
| 30 January 2013 | Portland | United States | State Theatre |
| 31 January 2013 | New York City | United States | Radio City Music Hall |
South America
| 3 April 2013 | São Paulo | Brazil | Credicard Hall |
| 5 April 2013 | Lima | Peru | Parque de la Exposición |
| 7 April 2013^{[M]} | Santiago | Chile | Parque O'Higgins |
| 8 April 2013^{[M]} | Santiago | Chile | Teatro La Cúpula |
| 11 April 2013 | Buenos Aires | Argentina | Luna Park |
| 12 April 2013 | Buenos Aires | Argentina | Luna Park |
Asia
| 10 May 2013^{[N]} | Dubai | United Arab Emirates | Atlantis Beach |
Europe
| 13 June 2013^{[O]} | Oslo | Norway | Frognerbadet |
| 14 June 2013^{[P]} | Aarhus | Denmark | NorthSide |
| 15 June 2013^{[Q]} | Broek op Langedijk | Netherlands | Recreatiegebied Geestmerambacht |
| 6 July 2013^{[R]} | Great Tew | England | Great Tew Estate |
| 13 July 2013^{[S]} | Werchter | Belgium | Werchter Festival Grounds |
| 2 August 2013^{[T]} | Santander | Spain | Campa de la Magdalena |
| 3 August 2013^{[U]} | Cantanhede | Portugal | Parque Expo-Desportivo de S. Mateus |
| 5 August 2013^{[V]} | Calella de Palafrugell | Spain | Jardín Botánico del Cap Roig |
| 9 August 2013^{[W]} | Newmarket | England | Newmarket Racecourse |
| 11 August 2013^{[X]} | Portimão | Portugal | Autódromo Internacional do Algarve |
| 24 August 2013^{[Y]} | Laverstoke | England | Laverstoke Park Farm |
| 25 August 2013^{[Z]} | London | England | Kenwood House |

Festivals and other miscellaneous performances

^{A} South by Southwest
^{B} Pinkpop Festival
^{C} Rock im Park
^{D} Rock am Ring
^{E} Hastings Beer and Music Festival
^{F} T in the Park
^{G} Bilbao BBK Live
^{H} Cascais Festival
^{I} Positivus Festival
^{J} Pukkelpop
^{K} V Festival
^{L} Bumbershoot
^{M} Lollapalooza
^{N} Sandance
^{O} Norwegian Wood
^{P} NorthSide Festival
^{Q} Indian Summer Festival
^{R} Cornbury Festival
^{S} TW Classic
^{T} Santander Music Festival
^{U} Expofacic
^{V} Festival de Cap Roig
^{W} Adnams Newmarket Night
^{X} AIA Summer Party
^{Y} CarFest South
^{Z} Kenwood's Outdoor Summer Concerts

Cancellations and rescheduled shows

| 8 December 2012 | Miami | Bayfront Park Amphitheater | Cancelled. Concert was a part of the UR1 Festival. |
| 20 June 2013 | Istanbul, Turkey | Parkorman | Cancelled. Concert was a part of the One Love Festival. |

=== Box office score data ===
| Venue | City | Tickets sold / available | Gross revenue |
|---|---|---|---|
| Beacon Theatre | New York City | 2,787 / 2,787 (100%) | $157,765 |
| Olympia de Montréal | Montreal | 1,159 / 1,200 (96%) | $39,865 |
| Vic Theatre | Chicago | 1,400 / 1,400 (100%) | $54,600 |
| Fox Oakland Theatre | Oakland | 2,475 / 2,800 (88%) | $97,933 |
| Hipódromo de Asunción | Asunción | 10,226 / 12,950 (79%) | $424,330 |
| Hallenstadion | Zürich | 2,983 / 3,694 (81%) | $181,721 |
| Manchester Arena | Manchester | 7,637 / 8,752 (87%) | $376,561 |
| The O_{2} Arena | London | 12,673 / 14,052 (90%) | $679,336 |
| Warfield Theatre | San Francisco | 1,815 / 2,351 (77%) | $75,158 |
| Pantages Theatre | Los Angeles | 2,724 / 2,724 (100%) | $135,087 |
| Ryman Auditorium | Nashville | 1,756 / 2,226 (79%) | $56,830 |
| Newport Music Hall | Columbus | 1,600 / 1,600 (100%) | $42,440 |
| Royal Oak Music Theatre | Royal Oak | 1,150 / 1,150 (100%) | $42,373 |
| Flynn Center for the Performing Arts | Burlington | 743 / 925 (80%) | $31,365 |
| Radio City Music Hall | New York City | 4,825 / 5,961 (81%) | $273,747 |
| Credicard Hall | São Paulo | 3,830 / 4,327 (88%) | $285,113 |
| Parque de la Exposición | Lima | 6,106 / 6,106 (100%) | $392,911 |
| TOTAL | | 65,889 / 75,005 (88%) | $3,347,135 |

== Personnel ==
Band

- Tom Chaplin – lead vocals, electric guitar, acoustic guitar, synths.
- Tim Rice-Oxley – piano, synths, backing vocals
- Richard Hughes – drums, percussion, synths ("You Haven't Told Me Anything"), backing vocals
- Jesse Quin – bass guitar, synths, electric guitar, percussion, backing vocals

Crew

- Lighting Company: Lite Alternative (UK)/Upstaging (US)
- Lighting & Set Designer: Rob Sinclair
- Lighting Director: Matt Arthur
- Lighting Technicians: Mike Sheppard, Rob Starksfield (UK), Mike Ponsiglioni (US)
- Tour & Production Manager: Colin Davies
- Stage/Set Company: Hangman Ltd.
- Trucking Company: Fly By Night (UK)/Upstaging (US)
