= The Best of Keane =

Greatest hits album by Keane
- Released: 11 November 2013
- Recorded: 2001–12
- Genre: Alternative rock; synth-pop; post-Britpop
- Label: Island Records

Keane chronology
Strangeland (2012)	The Best of Keane (2013)	Cause and Effect (2019)

Singles from The Best of Keane
- 1. "Higher Than the Sun" Released: 28 September 2013; 2. "Won't Be Broken" Released: 20 January 2014

The Best of Keane is the first official compilation album by British group Keane. It was released on 11 November 2013 through Island Records. The album contains all of the singles from the band's first four studio albums, Hopes and Fears, Under the Iron Sea, Perfect Symmetry and Strangeland (with the exception of "The Lovers Are Losing" and "Better Than This", which are replaced by "My Shadow" from the Night Train EP and "Hamburg Song" from Under the Iron Sea), plus two new songs: "Higher Than the Sun" and "Won't Be Broken", written during the Strangeland era. The deluxe version of the album includes a second disc with all B-sides (excluding "She Opens Her Eyes" from This Is the Last Time, "Untitled 2" from Bedshaped, "Tyderian" from Nothing in My Way and some covers, remixes and live releases) and an unreleased song titled "Russian Farmer's Song".

== Background ==
The purpose of the compilation album is to celebrate the first 10 years of Keane's career, which began with the release of their first commercial single with Fierce Panda Records, "Everybody's Changing", in 2003. It is the first compilation album ever released by the band.

== Promotion ==
The album is promoted by the single "Higher Than the Sun", which first aired on Chris Evans' BBC Radio 2 show on 27 September 2013, and was released digitally on 28 September 2013.

== Track listing ==
Standard Edition
No.	Title	Originally from	Length
1.	"Everybody's Changing"	Hopes and Fears	3:35
2.	"Somewhere Only We Know"	Hopes and Fears	3:55
3.	"Bend and Break"	Hopes and Fears	3:38
4.	"Bedshaped"	Hopes and Fears	4:35
5.	"This Is the Last Time"	Hopes and Fears	3:27
6.	"Atlantic"	Under the Iron Sea	4:10
7.	"Is It Any Wonder?"	Under the Iron Sea	3:05
8.	"Nothing in My Way"	Under the Iron Sea	4:00
9.	"Hamburg Song"	Under the Iron Sea	4:37
10.	"Crystal Ball"	Under the Iron Sea	3:53
11.	"A Bad Dream"	Under the Iron Sea	5:02
12.	"Try Again"	Under the Iron Sea	4:27
13.	"Spiralling" (Radio Edit)	Perfect Symmetry	3:24
14.	"Perfect Symmetry"	Perfect Symmetry	5:11
15.	"My Shadow"	Night Train	4:49
16.	"Silenced by the Night"	Strangeland	3:16
17.	"Disconnected"	Strangeland	3:56
18.	"Sovereign Light Café" (Radio Edit)	Strangeland	3:28
19.	"Higher Than the Sun"	New song	3:21
20.	"Won't Be Broken"	New song	3:42

Deluxe Edition (bonus disc)
No.	Title	Originally from	Length
1.	"Snowed Under"	"Somewhere Only We Know"	3:49
2.	"Walnut Tree"	"Somewhere Only We Know"	3:37
3.	"Fly to Me"	"Everybody's Changing"	5:32
4.	"To the End of the Earth"	"Everybody's Changing"	3:02
5.	"The Way You Want It"	"Everybody's Changing"	3:16
6.	"Something in Me Was Dying"	"Bedshaped"	4:46
7.	"Allemande"	"This Is the Last Time"	4:23
8.	"Let It Slide"	"Is It Any Wonder?"	4:09
9.	"He Used to Be a Lovely Boy"	"Is It Any Wonder?"	3:36
10.	"Thin Air"	"Nothing in My Way"	3:56
11.	"The Iron Sea" (Magic Shop Version)	"Crystal Ball"	4:29
12.	"Maybe I Can Change"	"Crystal Ball"	3:55
13.	"Time to Go"	"The Lovers Are Losing"	3:49
14.	"Staring at the Ceiling"	"Perfect Symmetry"	3:50
15.	"Myth"	"Silenced by the Night"	4:54
16.	"Difficult Child"	"Sovereign Light Café"	3:44
17.	"Sea Fog" (Live in Mexico City)	"Disconnected"	3:41
18.	"Russian Farmer's Song"	Previously unreleased	6:34

== Charts ==
=== Weekly charts ===
Chart (2013)	Peak position
Belgian Albums (Ultratop Flanders)	15
Belgian Albums (Ultratop Wallonia)	10
Dutch Albums (Album Top 100)	13
Irish Albums (IRMA)	21
Portuguese Albums (AFP)	17
Scottish Albums (OCC)	9
Spanish Albums (PROMUSICAE)	24
Swiss Albums (Schweizer Hitparade)	66
UK Albums (OCC)	10

=== Year-end charts ===
Chart (2013)	Position
Belgian Albums (Ultratop Wallonia)	170
UK Albums (OCC)	75

== Certifications ==
Region	Certification	Certified units/sales
United Kingdom (BPI)	Platinum	300,000^{‡}
^{‡} Sales+streaming figures based on certification alone.
