= Tom Chaplin discography =

Discography of British singer Tom Chaplin

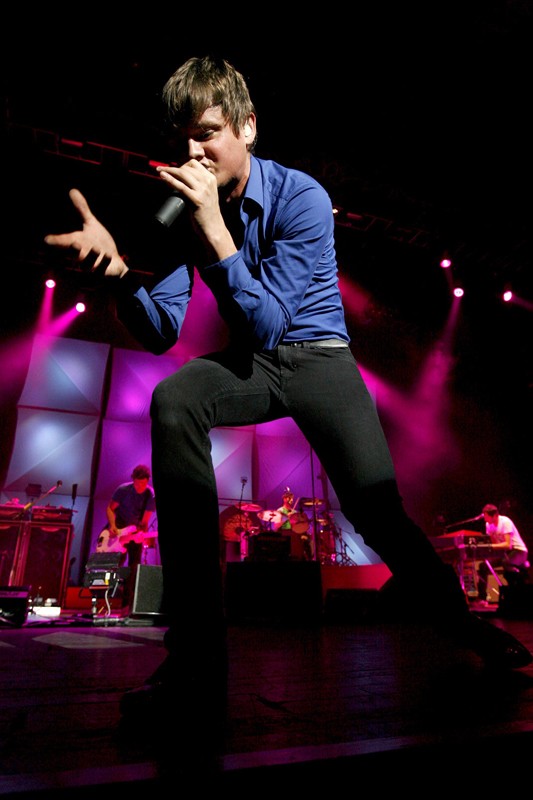
- Chaplin with Keane, at concert at Coliseu dos Recreios, Portugal on 12 November 2008
- Studio albums: 3
- Singles: 10
- Music videos: 8

The discography of British singer Tom Chaplin consists of three studio albums and ten singles.

Chaplin released his debut studio album The Wave on 14 October 2016. Four tracks from the album were released as singles: "Quicksand", "Still Waiting", "Solid Gold" and "See It So Clear".

The second studio album, Twelve Tales of Christmas, was released on 17 November 2017, with four singles being released: "Under a Million Lights", "2000 Miles", "River" and "Midnight Mass".

== Albums ==
=== Studio albums ===
List of studio albums, with selected chart positions, sales figures and certifications
Title	Album details	Peak chart positions
Title	Album details	UK
The Wave	Released: 14 October 2016; Label: Island; Formats: CD; digital download; 12" vinyl	3
Twelve Tales of Christmas	Released: 17 November 2017; Label: Island; Formats:	21
Midpoint	Released: 2 September 2022; Label: BMG; Formats:	19

== Singles ==
List of singles, with selected chart positions, showing year released and album name
Title	Year	Peak chart positions	Album
Title	Year	SCO	Album
"Quicksand"	2016	56	The Wave
"Still Waiting"	2017	—	The Wave
"Solid Gold"	2017	—	The Wave
"See It So Clear"	2017	—	The Wave
"Under a Million Lights"	2017	—	Twelve Tales of Christmas
"2000 Miles"	2017	—	Twelve Tales of Christmas
"River"	2017	—	Twelve Tales of Christmas
"Midnight Mass"	2017	—	Twelve Tales of Christmas
"Midpoint"	2022	—	Midpoint
"Gravitational"	2022	—	Midpoint

== Music videos ==
List of music videos, showing year released and directors
Title	Year	Director(s)
"Hardened Heart"	2016	
"Quicksand"	2016	
"Still Waiting"	2017	
"Solid Gold"	2017	
"See It So Clear"	2017	
"Midnight Mass"	2017	
"Midpoint"	2022	
"Gravitational"	2022	
