= Won't Be Broken =

Single by Keane

from the album The Best of Keane
- Released: 20 January 2014
- Genre: Alternative rock, pop rock
- Length: 3:42
- Label: Island
- Songwriter(s): Tim Rice-Oxley; Tom Chaplin; Richard Hughes; Jesse Quin

Keane singles chronology
"Higher Than the Sun" (2013)	"Won't Be Broken" (2014)	"Tear Up This Town" (2016)

"Won't Be Broken" is a song by English alternative rock band Keane, released on 20 January 2014 as the second single from the band's first compilation album, The Best of Keane.

== Composition and recording ==
"Won't Be Broken" is "an emotionally honest, piano led song about battling difficult times with determination and hope." The song was recorded during the recording sessions for the band's fourth studio album, Strangeland, released in May 2012.

== Charts ==
Chart (2014)	Peak position
Belgium (Ultratip Bubbling Under Wallonia)	25
