= Higher than the Sun (song) =

Single by Keane

from the album The Best of Keane
- Released: 28 September 2013
- Genre: Alternative rock, pop rock
- Length: 3:21
- Label: Island
- Songwriter(s): Tim Rice-Oxley; Tom Chaplin; Richard Hughes; Jesse Quin

Keane singles chronology
"Sovereign Light Café" (2012)	"Higher than the Sun" (2013)	"Won't Be Broken" (2014)

"Higher than the Sun" is a song by English alternative rock band Keane, released on 28 September 2013 as the first single from their first compilation album, The Best of Keane. The song was recorded during the recording sessions for the band's fourth studio album, Strangeland, which was released in May 2012.

== Release ==
Keane announced the release of the single on their official website on 23 September 2013. On 27 September, the song made its radio debut on Chris Evans' BBC Radio 2 morning show, and was released digitally the next day.

== Critical reception ==
According to Contactmusic.com, "Higher Than the Sun" is "a punchy up-beat song with characteristic vocals from Tom Chaplin and an unforgettable chorus."

== Music video ==
The music video for the song premiered on 2 October 2013 on Keane's YouTube channel. It was directed by Chris Boyle. The video is an animation mapping 10 years of Keane history, from an indie band to "one of the world's biggest British bands of the decade." It contains images resembling cover arts of the band's four albums, and shows abstract caricatures and sketches, and the band performing on stage.

== Charts ==
Chart (2013)	Peak position
Belgium (Ultratip Bubbling Under Flanders)	12
Belgium (Ultratip Bubbling Under Wallonia)	5
Japan (Japan Hot 100)	82
