= Mt. Desolation (album) =

Studio album by Mt. Desolation
- Released: 18 October 2010
- Recorded: January 2010
- Studios: Eastcote Studios, London. -Sea Fog Studios (East Sussex)
- Genre: Alternative country
- Length: 49:05
- Labels: Island; Cherrytree; Coop
- Producer: Emery Dobyns

Mt. Desolation chronology
Mt. Desolation (2010)	When the Night Calls (2018)

Singles from Mt. Desolation
- 1. "Departure / State of Our Affairs" Released: 18 October 2010; 2. "Bitter Pill" Released: 15 September 2010

Mt. Desolation is the debut studio album by English alt country duo Mt. Desolation, released on 18 October 2010 in the United Kingdom and on 19 October 2010 in the US. This is the first album by the side project of the band Keane's Tim Rice-Oxley and Jesse Quin.

It was recorded in part at Tim's country home and studio in Sussex (credited in the liner notes as "Tim's House"), during a transitional period for the studio before it adopted its final name, Sea Fog.

== Track listing ==
All tracks written by Tim Rice-Oxley and Jesse Quin.

No.	Title	Length
1.	"Departure"	3:37
2.	"Annie Ford"	4:21
3.	"Bridal Gown"	4:57
4.	"State of Our Affairs"	4:39
5.	"Bitter Pill"	4:07
6.	"Another Night on My Side"	3:01
7.	"Midnight Ghost"	5:05
8.	"Platform 7"	3:34
9.	"My My My"	3:49
10.	"Coming Home/Halo of Fireflies"	11:55
11.	"Pushed Around" (Amazon MP3 and 7Digital UK exclusive bonus track)	3:31
12.	"Wherever You Were Going" (iTunes exclusive bonus track)	2:51
Total length:		49:05

=== Bonus songs ===
Most pressings of the CD only include 11 songs ("Halo of Fireflies", hidden after "Coming Home", is not listed on the back), however some extra songs have been released, either on special pressings of the CD, or digitally.

- The Barnes & Noble version of the album includes 2 bonus tracks, "Emily" and the demo for "Bitter Pill".
- The iTunes version has "Wherever You Were Going" listed as track 11.
- The Amazon MP3 version has "Coming Home" and "Halo of Fireflies" listed as two separate tracks, and includes "Pushed Around" as track 12.
- The song "Your Kind of Life" is part of the live setlist of most Mt. Desolation gigs, but has not been officially released.

== Reception ==
Professional ratings
Review scores
Source	Rating
AllMusic	3.5/5 stars
Uncut	4/5 stars

The album was met with generally favourable reviews, with The Guardian thinking of it, when compared to Keane's Night Train, as a "more convincing vehicle for their undisputed melodic gifts" and citing "Bitter Pill" as a highlight.

BBC Music called the production "fittingly delicate and unfussy, with no oppressive effects" and commented on the singer's voices, saying "Rice-Oxley and Quin [...] both sound a little shy", but welcoming the "intermittent, effortlessly harmonising female vocals".

Virgin.com, however, wasn't as enthusiastic, giving the album a 6 out of 10, describing their self-titled debut as "a mixed bag of charming country inspired tunes and hard to take seriously line dancing tracks", before adding that "the self gratifying love for the music that has been created makes this collaborative country collection well worth a listen despite the odd rogue."

== Personnel ==
Mt Desolation:

- Tim Rice-Oxley - vocals, piano, synths, composition
- Jesse Quin - vocals, lead guitar, composition

Support musicians:

- Fimbo – drums
- Jessica Staveley-Taylor – backing vocals, acoustic guitar, piano
- John-William Scott – bass, guitar
- Phil Renna – fiddle, keyboards

Guest artists:

- Ronnie Vannucci - drums, guitars, vibes
- "Country" Winston Marshall - banjo
- Charity Quin - backing vocals
- Jayne Rice-Oxley - backing vocals
- Francois Deville - pedal steel
- Andrew Lowe – bass
- John Roderick – backing vocals, guitar
- Pete Roe – keyboards, backing vocals
- Tom Hobden – fiddle

== Chart performance ==
Chart (2010)	Peak position
UK Albums Chart	140
US Billboard Heatseekers Albums	10
