= Stop for a Minute =

Stop for a Minute may refer to:

- "Stop for a Minute" (Keane song), featuring K'naan, 2010
- "Stop for a Minute" (Polish Club song), 2021
- "Stop for a Minute" (Sandra song), 1988
