= Silenced by the Night =

Single by Keane

from the album Strangeland
- B-side: "Myth"
- Released: 13 March 2012
- Genre: Pop rock, piano rock
- Length: 3:16
- Label: Island Records
- Songwriters: Tim Rice-Oxley, Tom Chaplin, Richard Hughes, Jesse Quin
- Producer: Dan Grech-Marguerat

Keane singles chronology
"Stop for a Minute" (2010)	"Silenced by the Night" (2012)	"Disconnected" (2012)

Music video
- "Silenced by the Night" on YouTube

"Silenced by the Night" is a song by English rock band Keane from their fourth studio album Strangeland. It was released worldwide as the album's lead single on 13 March 2012, except for the United Kingdom where it was released on 13 April 2012. The song was written by Tim Rice-Oxley, Tom Chaplin, Richard Hughes, Jesse Quin and produced by Dan Grech-Marguerat.

== Release ==
"Silenced by the Night" was originally only to be released as a commercial single in the United States. However, the single was released in other international markets on 13 March 2012. In the United Kingdom, the single was released on 13 April 2012.

== Music video ==
A music video to accompany the release of "Silenced by the Night" was first released onto Vevo on YouTube on 4 April 2012 at a total length of three minutes and thirty-one seconds.

The song's music video, which is directed by Christopher Sims, was shot at a lime salt mine in Austin, Texas. It depicts a couple making a road trip across the US.

== Live performances ==
Keane performed the song for the first time on 12 March on American talk show Jimmy Kimmel Live!

== Track listing ==
Digital download
No.	Title	Length
1.	"Silenced by the Night"	3:16

Maxi digital download
No.	Title	Length
1.	"Silenced by the Night"	3:16
2.	"Myth"	4:55

Digital download — remix
No.	Title	Length
1.	"Silenced by the Night" (Alesso Remix)	6:13

== Charts ==
Chart (2012)	Peak position
Belgium (Ultratop 50 Flanders)	28
Belgium (Ultratop 50 Wallonia)	14
France (SNEP)	156
Netherlands (Dutch Top 40)	21
Netherlands (Single Top 100)	50
Japan (Japan Hot 100)	27
Spain (PROMUSICAE)	41
UK Singles (OCC)	46
UK Official Download Chart	45
US Billboard Triple A	6

== Radio and release history ==
Country	Release date	Format	Label
Worldwide	13 March 2012	Digital download	Island Records
United States	26 March 2012	Adult alternative radio airplay	Interscope Records
United Kingdom	13 April 2012	Digital download	Island Records
Worldwide	11 May 2012	Digital download — remix	Refune Records
