= Atlantic (song) =

Single by Keane

from the album Under the Iron Sea
- Released: 24 April 2006
- Studio: Heliocentric, Rye, East Sussex; Magic Shop, New York City
- Genre: New-age, alternative rock
- Length: 6:11 (video); 4:13 (album version)
- Label: Island
- Songwriter(s): Tim Rice-Oxley; Tom Chaplin; Richard Hughes
- Producer(s): Andy Green

Keane singles chronology
"Bend and Break" (2005)	"Atlantic" (2006)	"Is It Any Wonder?" (2006)

Music video
- "Atlantic" on YouTube

"Atlantic" is a song performed and composed by English alternative rock band Keane, released as the first single from their second studio album Under the Iron Sea, firstly as a download only music video and later as a 7" vinyl limited edition. The song was premiered at a secret gig in London on 5 April 2006.

"Atlantic" was featured in the TV series CSI: NY in the eighth episode of the third season "Consequences".

== Composition ==
"Atlantic" was composed by Tim Rice-Oxley c. 2005 and recorded at the Helioscentric Studios, Rye, East Sussex and at the Magic Shop, New York City. First demos featured Rice-Oxley instead of Chaplin on the lead vocals. The first verse, lyrically, was different from the final version. Sessions at the Magic Shop for the recording of this song were filmed and released on the Under the Iron Sea DVD.

=== Musical structure ===
The song opens with Rice-Oxley's electric piano instrumentally. After 30 seconds, the bass and drums are added. Chaplin's vocals are then introduced, and the drums drop out for 16 beats. Later on, the song drastically changes its tone to introduce the chorus and the final part. While the album version fades with strings, the video version incorporates the outro of "The Iron Sea", with electronic sounds including echoes and voices.

== Song's meaning ==
According to Keane.at, "This song talks about newly-wed Rice-Oxley feelings about his relationship."

Rice-Oxley also explained this on 22 May 2006:

Well Atlantic was the first thing that we recorded for the record, and it was actually gonna be a b-side. It was weird (...) It's a piece of music that I'm really really proud, and I think we're all really really proud of as a band. It's a great example of a piece of music that we've all contributed to, and it wouldn't be the song that it is unless we all put something special into it. The reason it's the first song on the record, is because it's got such an incredible atmosphere to it, and I guess it's about having a terror of being alone - it sets the mood of the record really well, both musically and lyrically.

== Music video ==
The video for "Atlantic", aired only in Europe, was directed by Scottish novelist Irvine Welsh. It is entirely black and white and starts with scenes of the Atlantic Ocean and a beach in Sussex, and did not feature the band.

A long-haired, bearded man with ragged clothes, played by Jonathan Lewis Owen, a business partner of Welsh's, comes out of the ocean and walks quietly along the beach. Firstly, he sees a couple tying a rolled sheet of paper - presumably a message for help - and putting it into a bottle before they throw it to the sea. He stops briefly to watch them, and then continues walking to find a boy kicking a football. The ball rebounds on the cliff and falls into the water; the boy asks the man to fetch it, but he refuses, so the boy kicks him and runs away.

When the man recovers he continues walking, and sees a large swimming-costume clad woman, played by Cheryl Fergison, with a life-ring who throws herself to the sea and disappears while the life-ring floats on the waves. The man is shocked, looks around for somebody to help her, sees no one and then walks on. He finds an old man who has a metal detector, and points out a place along the shore and the metal detector finds something in the sand. Digging, they find what seems to be a dead bird. The old man runs away shortly before the main man. When the chorus leads in, the man finds two children building a sand castle, who promptly destroy it upon seeing him.

The song ends and a part of the instrumental "The Iron Sea", comes in as the final scenes show three teenagers throwing two unlit petrol bombs into the sea, and when the man turns around, he faces a pale man with a dark hooded cloak representing Death, or the Grim Reaper, and loses himself in Death's eyes. Immediately, for two seconds every person in the video appears, and in the final shot they all follow Death with linked hands - this bears a resemblance to the final shot of the Swedish film The Seventh Seal.

== Cover art ==
The cover artwork for the single was designed by Sanna Annukka Smith, a Finnish artist in May 2006. The single cover is also the illustration representing the song in the inner pages of the book-shaped CD+DVD edition.

== Track listing ==
UK 7" vinyl
No.	Title	Length
1.	"Atlantic"	4:13

- The single came inside a special box designed to contain the remaining singles of the "Under the Iron Sea era" (similar to the one released with "The Sun Ain't Gonna Shine Anymore")

iTunes video
No.	Title	Length
1.	"Atlantic"	6:02
