= Is It Any Wonder? =

2006 single by Keane

Single by Keane

from the album Under the Iron Sea
- B-side: "Let It Slide"; "He Used to Be a Lovely Boy"
- Released: 29 May 2006
- Studio: Heliocentric (Rye, East Sussex); Magic Shop (New York City)
- Length: 3:06
- Label: Island; Interscope
- Songwriters: Tim Rice-Oxley; Tom Chaplin; Richard Hughes
- Producer: Andy Green

Keane singles chronology
"Atlantic" (2006)	"Is It Any Wonder?" (2006)	"Crystal Ball" (2006)

Music video
- "Is It Any Wonder?" on YouTube

"Is It Any Wonder?" is a song written and performed by English alternative rock band Keane, released as the second single from their second studio album, Under the Iron Sea. The single was released to the iTunes Store on 16 May and to shops on 29 May 2006. "Is It Any Wonder?" debuted at number 15 on the UK Singles Chart on 28 May 2006 based on download sales alone and reached number three with physical sales added on 4 June. The song was nominated for Best Pop Performance by a Duo or Group at the 2007 Grammy Awards, losing to "My Humps" by the Black Eyed Peas.

== Composition and recording ==
"Is It Any Wonder?" was composed by Tim Rice-Oxley in 2005, being first demoed the same year. The guitar effects originate from Tim's distorted Yamaha CP70 piano. An early demo appeared on the Under the Iron Sea DVD. It was mainly recorded at The Magic Shop studios, New York City and programmed and engineered by Andy Green.

=== Musical structure ===
"Is It Any Wonder?" was composed under an 8-beat 4/4 time signature and a 130-bpm tempo. The main key of the riff is A major, alternating to G major when the bass starts playing.

The song starts with bashing piano notes, leading to Tim-Rice Oxley's deep distorted piano sound that is used to emulate abrasive electric guitar riffs. Bass guitar lines, synthesizers, and drums begin to finally introduce Tom Chaplin with the vocals of the first verse. Rice-Oxley continues to play regular and distorted piano notes throughout the verses of the song. As with almost all Keane songs, it includes a bridge after the second chorus, preceding the outro. Live performances show several differences from the studio version. Firstly, the deep sound is changed for the same synthesizer used for the whole song, which is also quite different from the track on the studio album. During the first verse of the original version, a synthesizer is used as a background for Chaplin's singing. However, on the live performance, Rice-Oxley keeps playing his distorted Yamaha CP70 piano throughout the song, instead of the synthesizer. Finally, drumming on the main riffs is modified, with Hughes beating the crash cymbal again and again.

== Meaning ==
The song is about the Iraq War:

It's probably the one song on the record that most expresses our dismay and confusion about what it means to be a British citizen, in terms of what our society's contributing to the world at large," Rice-Oxley explains. "It's very hard to make sense of why Britain feels it needs to sign up with George Bush's attacks on Iraq and the whole Afghanistan thing. It feels like there's a whole lot of trouble brewing up over Iran, and you just don't know where it's going to end. On a personal level, for people of our age, it's really unsettling...

The song is not an attempt at some sort of wide-sweeping political statement, it's just about just seeing things from a personal level – what are you supposed to believe, what is actually right? How can you work out what is the truth, and what is the right thing to do? And there's so many different opinions, and you're supposed to have an opinion on what your country is doing, and yet it is so hard to even begin to gather all the facts. It's really distressing thing for people of our generation I think, the feeling of not being able to do anything about that. I guess that was something we were all feeling very acutely in the song. And I think the sounds of the song sum that up in a very tangible way.

== Music video ==
Directed by Kevin Godley, the video is almost the same throughout the song. A camera moves along a metal track like a roller coaster. The camera runs through rails until the end of it, stopping again. Keane are in the middle of it, with Tom appearing sometimes on the scene. The CD+DVD edition of Under the Iron Sea includes a trailer for the making of the video, as well as the videoclip.

== Cover art and packaging ==
The cover artwork for the single was designed by Sanna Annukka Smith, a Finnish artist in March 2006. Sanna originally wanted a red bird crying and Keane wanted a lonely soldier. During the first two weeks of April, the cover showed a soldier but the definite version shows the red bird crying on the soldier's shoulder, with the soldier referring to war. Some versions didn't include the bird, like the first cover. The crying bird later appeared on the cover for "Try Again". Similar to the book-shaped box of the DVD for Under the Iron Sea, this biodegradable single's container is made of carbon neutral and recycled materials, without any plastics.

== B-sides ==
=== "Let It Slide" ===
The Under the Iron Sea DVD includes bass recording sessions of this song. It was planned to be a track on the album, but became a B-side instead. It did appear on the Japanese version of Under the Iron Sea as the closing track.

=== "He Used to Be a Lovely Boy" ===
Following a melancholic ballad style, the song suggests a reference to Chaplin by Rice-Oxley. This acoustic song has been compared by fans to Keane's Christmas song "A Heart to Hold You", and B-side "The Way You Want It".

== Track listings ==
UK CD single
No.	Title	Length
1.	"Is It Any Wonder?"	3:08
2.	"Let It Slide"	4:10
3.	"He Used to Be a Lovely Boy"	3:38

UK 7-inch single and European CD single
No.	Title	Length
1.	"Is It Any Wonder?"	3:08
2.	"Let It Slide"	4:10

== Charts ==
=== Weekly charts ===
Chart (2006)	Peak position
Australian Digital Tracks (ARIA)	39
Austria (Ö3 Austria Top 40)	47
Belgium (Ultratop 50 Flanders)	38
Belgium (Ultratip Bubbling Under Wallonia)	3
Canada CHR/Top 40 (Billboard)	50
Canada Hot AC (Billboard)	34
Canada Rock (Billboard)	12
Czech Republic Airplay (ČNS IFPI)	15
Europe (Eurochart Hot 100)	7
France (SNEP)	72
Germany (GfK)	61
Hungary (Rádiós Top 40)	38
Ireland (IRMA)	18
Italy (FIMI)	18
Netherlands (Dutch Top 40)	7
Netherlands (Single Top 100)	17
Norway (VG-lista)	12
Scottish Singles Sales (Official Charts)	7
Spain (Promusicae)	3
Switzerland (Schweizer Hitparade)	28
UK Singles (Official Charts)	3
US Billboard Hot 100	78
US Adult Alternative Airplay (Billboard)	1
US Adult Pop Airplay (Billboard)	18
US Alternative Airplay (Billboard)	18
US Dance Airplay (Billboard)	4
US Dance Club Songs (Billboard)	10

=== Year-end charts ===
Chart (2006)	Position
Netherlands (Dutch Top 40)	29
Netherlands (Single Top 100)	70
UK Singles (OCC)	74

== Certifications ==
Region	Certification	Certified units/sales
United Kingdom (BPI)	Silver	200,000^{‡}
^{‡} Sales+streaming figures based on certification alone.

== Release history ==
Region	Date	Format(s)	Label(s)	Ref.
United Kingdom	29 May 2006	CD	Island	
United States	29 May 2006	Modern rock radio	Interscope	
