= When the Night Calls =

Studio album by Mt. Desolation
- Released: 25 May 2018
- Recorded: February 2016 – 2017
- Studios: Sea Fog Studios, East Sussex
- Genre: Alternative country

Mt. Desolation chronology
Mt. Desolation (2010)	When the Night Calls (2018)	Through Crooked Aim (2023)

When the Night Calls is the second studio album by English alternative country duo Mt. Desolation. This is the second album by the side project of the band Keane's Tim Rice-Oxley and Jesse Quin.

== Track listing ==
All tracks written by Tim Rice-Oxley and Jesse Quin.

No.	Title	Length
1.	"By The River"	4:20
2.	"Someday, Somehow"	4:40
3.	"Control"	4:33
4.	"How To Fly"	3:34
5.	"Valentine"	4:54
6.	"Distraction"	3:45
7.	"The Moon Was Down"	3:27
8.	"On Your Way"	3:57
9.	"Release Me Girl"	4:23
10.	"When The Night Calls"	3:24
11.	"After You're Gone"	3:12
Total length:		44:09

== Personnel ==
Mt Desolation:

- Tim Rice-Oxley - vocals, piano, synths, composition
- Jesse Quin - vocals, lead guitar, composition
