= Alexandra Park, Hastings =

Public park in East Sussex, England

Alexandra Park
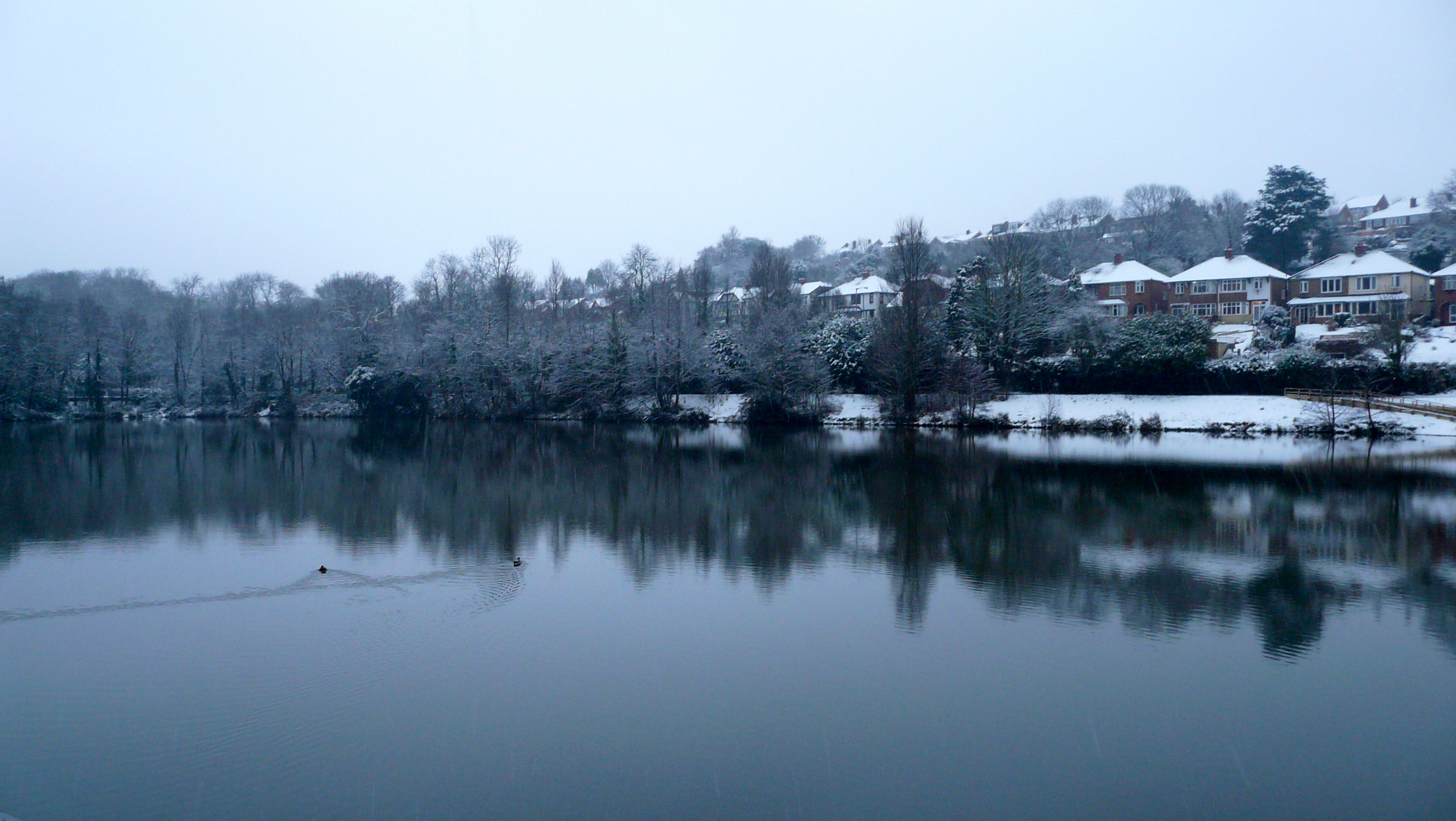

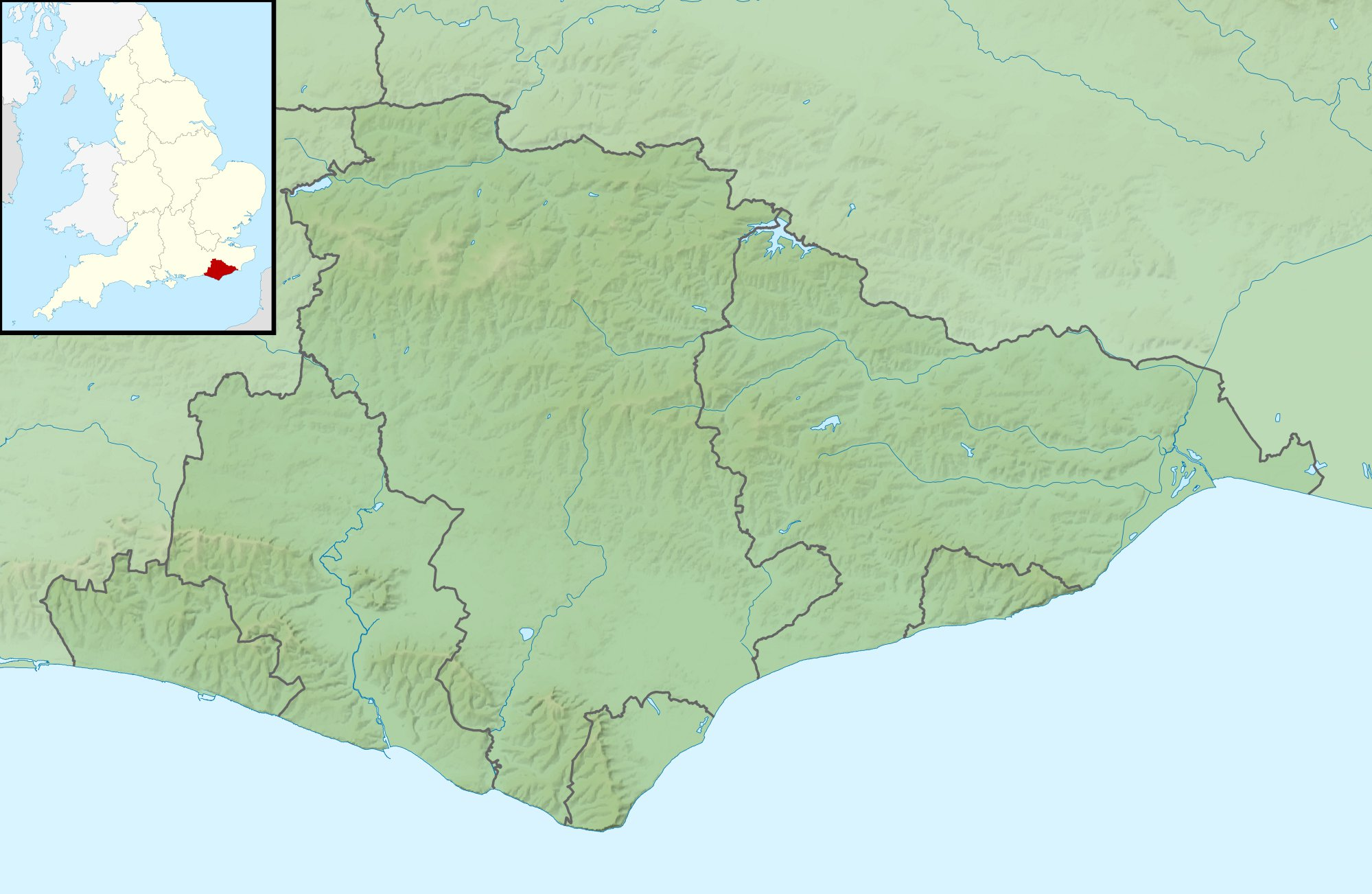
- Location within East Sussex
- Interactive map of Alexandra Park
- Type: Woodland
- Location: Hastings, East Sussex, England
- Coordinates: 50°51′58″N 0°33′58″E
- Area: 109 acres (0.44 km^{2})
- Created: 26 June 1882
- Open: 7 days a week, dawn until dusk
- Status: Open all year

Alexandra Park is a public park located in Hastings, East Sussex in England. Originally named St Andrews Gardens at its opening in 1864, it was then redesigned by Robert Marnock during 1877. The park grew in a series of increments and now occupies approximately 109 acres (0.44 km^{2}) of the town. Its linear area stretches from the town centre out to residential areas. It was formally opened by the Prince and Princess of Wales on 26 June 1882, and named after the latter.

During 1998, much of the lower portion of the park was closed and given to an ambitious storm drain project by Southern Water, which also involved tunnelling in several other areas throughout the town. At the close of the project, the park's lawns and entrances were returned to their original state as designed by Marnock.

In April 2004, the park was officially reopened by Charlie Dimmock and the Mayor of Hastings after a large regeneration scheme costing £3.46m. Initial surveys suggest that park visitor numbers have dramatically increased since the completion of the scheme. The whole park is grade II listed

== Wildlife ==
The park fauna consists of grey squirrels, Canada geese and mallard ducks as well as an array of different bird life.

== Facilities ==
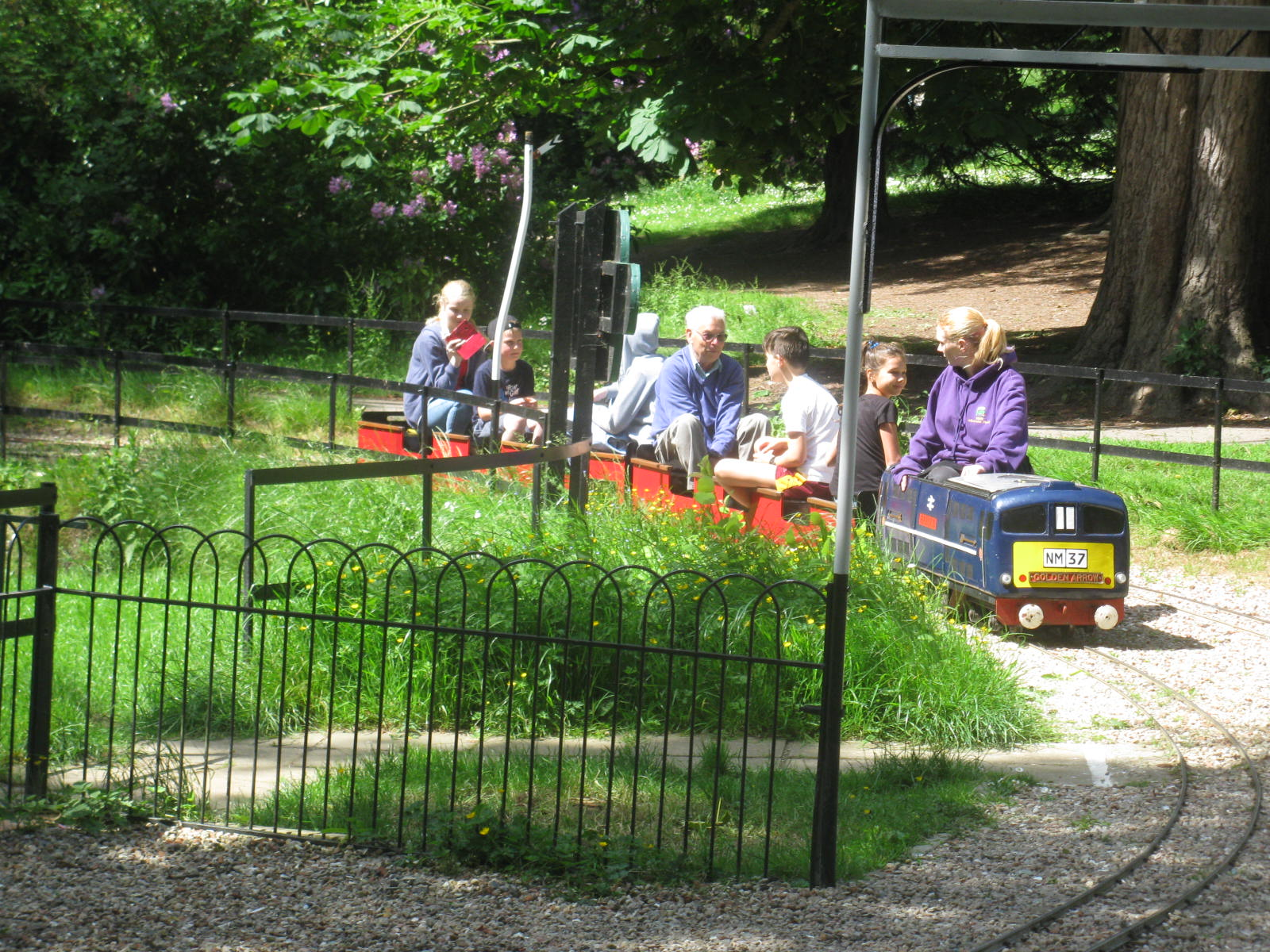
Miniature railway.

The park features several small water reservoirs that provide popular locations for leisure fishing within the town. The lower area of the park has several public facilities including a lake, war memorial, bowls green, information point, toilets, café, events areas, bandstand and adventure playground. There is a water thoroughfare all around the park linking the reservoirs. There is a 7 1/4 in (184 mm) gauge miniature railway at the northern end of the park.

== Events ==
The park used to host the annual Hastings Beer and Music Festival, which takes place in July, but now takes place on The Oval showground. In addition, the open air bandstand is used for various band concerts throughout the summer months. Further up the park there is a Chalybeate Spring.
