= Mt. Desolation =

English band

- Origin: England
- Genres: Alternative country, alternative rock, country rock
- Years active: 2010–present
- Members: Tim Rice-Oxley; Jesse Quin
- Website: https://www.mtdesolation.co.uk/

Mt. Desolation are an English band formed by Tim Rice-Oxley and Jesse Quin, members of the rock band Keane, as a side-project. Their first album Mt. Desolation was released on 18 October 2010.

The live band consists primarily of Tim Rice-Oxley, Jesse Quin, Jessica Staveley-Taylor, Fimbo, John-William Scott and Phil Renna.

== History ==
The project started during Keane's Perfect Symmetry World Tour in 2009 during a conversation in a bar in Dublin, Ireland. Rice-Oxley and Quin, Keane pianist and bassist, respectively, had the idea of making a country album, but the duo said they did not think they were going to release it. The album was recorded and released in 2010.

Members of Noah and the Whale, the Killers, the Long Winters, the Staves and Mumford & Sons were involved in the album's recording. After their debut show at The Lexington in London in July, the live band toured the UK in September 2010 and the USA & Canada supporting Mumford & Sons in October 2010. The Staves supported the band's UK tour dates.

The band launched a Tumblr blog on 6 November 2014, prompting speculation that the band were recording a new album during Keane's hiatus. This was later confirmed by band member Jesse Quin on his Twitter feed.

In February 2016, Mt. Desolation announced on Twitter that they were working on their second album. Over the next two years the band posted several hinting pictures and videos on Instagram and Facebook, concerning their next album. In October 2017, the band played a gig in Battle, East Sussex, during which new songs were performed. On 26 March 2018, the band announced their new album's title and release date. When the Night Calls was released on 25 May 2018. It was followed by a short tour of the UK in June 2018.

Almost five years later, in February 2023, Mt. Desolation released the single "Sunrise" and announced their third album, Through Crooked Aim, scheduled for release on 21 April 2023.

== Members ==
- Tim Rice-Oxley – composition, vocals, piano, keyboards, bass (2010–present)
- Jesse Quin – composition, vocals, guitar (2010–present)

Additional personnel

- Fimbo – drums (2010–present)
- Jessica Staveley-Taylor – backing vocals, acoustic guitar, piano (2010–present)
- John-William Scott – bass, guitar (2010–present)
- Phil Renna – fiddle, keyboards (2010–present)
- Ronnie Vannucci Jr. – drums, acoustic guitar, percussion (2010)

== Discography ==
=== Studio albums ===
| Title | Details | Peak chart positions | |
| Title | Details | UK | US Heat |
|---|---|---|---|
| Mt. Desolation | Release date: 18 October 2010; Label: Island/Cherrytree Records; Formats: CD, digital download | 140 | 10 |
| When the Night Calls | Release date: 25 May 2018; Label: Island | | |
| Through Crooked Aim | Release date: 21 April 2023; Label: No Roads Records | | |

=== Singles ===
| Single | Year | Album |
|---|---|---|
| "Departure / State of Our Affairs" | 2010 | Mt. Desolation |
| "Bitter Pill" | 2010 | Mt. Desolation |
| "On Your Way" | 2018 | When the Night Calls |
| "Sunrise" | 2023 | Through Crooked Aim |

== Songs in other media ==
| Year | Title | Type | Song |
|---|---|---|---|
| 2010 | Gossip Girl | TV series episode: "The Townie" | "State of Our Affairs" |
| 2011 | Grey's Anatomy | TV series episode: "Disarm" | "State of Our Affairs" |
