= Strangers (video) =

Video by Keane
- Released: 11 November 2005
- Recorded: Helioscentric Studios, various live gigs, Keane tour bus.
- Genre: Rock
- Length: 204 min. (3h 24)
- Label: Island Records; Universal Music
- Director: Ed Roe

Keane chronology
Hopes and Fears DVD (2004)	Strangers (2005)	Under the Iron Sea DVD (2006)

Strangers is English rock band Keane's first musical-documentary DVD. It was named "Strangers" as their feelings before triumphing in music and as a reference to the song "We Might as Well Be Strangers" appearing on their debut album Hopes and Fears. The discs contain a documentary narrated by Ed Roe, friend and photographer of Keane, and co-narrated by Keane. Band members talk about their feelings before being famous and how they succeed. Both DVDs contain Keane music and their videoclips, as well as live performances.

== Contents ==
=== DVD 1 ===
- "Strangers" documentary part 1

==== Live performances ====
- "Sunshine"
- "With or Without You" (U2 cover on BBC Radio 1)
- "Somewhere Only We Know"
- "Can't Stop Now"
- "She Has No Time"
- "Your Eyes Open"
- "This Is the Last Time"
- "Allemande"

==== Background tracks ====
- "Sunshine"
- "Something in Me Was Dying"
- "Paperback Writer" (The Beatles cover)
- "Somewhere Only We Know"
- "She Has No Time" (Instrumental)
- "This Is the Last Time" (Instrumental)
- "Can't Stop Now"
- "Your Eyes Open" (Demo)
- "Bedshaped"
- "Allemande"
- "Everybody's Changing"
- "Walnut Tree"
- "She Opens Her Eyes"
- "Closer Now"
- "The Way You Want It"
- "To the End of the Earth"

==== Music videos ====
- "Somewhere Only We Know" (UK, US Ver. 2)
- "This Is the Last Time" (Ver.2); Making the video
- Additional documentary footage
- Opinions
- Hidden video: Ed Roe

=== DVD 2 ===
- "Strangers" documentary part 2

==== Live performances ====
- "Snowed Under"
- "Bedshaped"
- "We Might as Well Be Strangers"
- "Bend and Break"
- "On a Day Like Today"
- "Everybody's Changing"
- "Hamburg Song"
- "Try Again"

Background tracks

- "Snowed Under"
- "Everybody's Changing" (Instrumental)
- "We Might as Well Be Strangers" (Instrumental)
- "Bend and Break"
- "Dinner at 8" (Rufus Wainwright cover)
- Try Again (Demo)
- "Fly to Me"
- "Untitled 2"

Music videos

- "Bedshaped"
- "Everybody's Changing" (UK, US)
- Additional documentary footage
- Opinions

== Alternative versions ==
Digipack Special Edition

- New additional photos
