= Crystal Ball (Keane song) =

2006 single by Keane

Single by Keane

from the album Under the Iron Sea
- B-side: "Maybe I Can Change"; "The Iron Sea: Magic Shop Version"
- Released: 21 August 2006
- Studio: Heliocentric (Rye, East Sussex); Magic Shop (New York City)
- Length: 3:53
- Label: Island
- Songwriters: Tim Rice-Oxley; Tom Chaplin; Richard Hughes
- Producers: Andy Green; Keane

Keane singles chronology
"Is It Any Wonder?" (2006)	"Crystal Ball" (2006)	"Nothing in My Way" (2006)

Music video
- "Crystal Ball" on YouTube

"Crystal Ball" is a song performed and composed by English rock band Keane, featured on their second studio album, Under the Iron Sea (2006). The song was released on 21 August 2006 as the third single from the album. "Crystal Ball" peaked at number 20 on both the Dutch Singles Chart and the UK Singles Chart.

== Composition and recording ==
"Crystal Ball" was composed by Tim Rice-Oxley in 2006. It was recorded at the Helioscentric Studios, East Sussex and at the Magic Shop, New York City. Guitar effects are created by a distorted Yamaha CP70.

== Information about song's meaning ==
Our touring schedule over the last couple of years meant that we were on the road all the time, and were never kinda stopping to really appreciate what was going and just spend time having fun – just the three of us functioning as friends and as people, like you normally do. And I think we all started to recede slightly into this little world where we weren't really communicating or really expressing anything, and we weren't really feeling anything. And it kind of came to a head when we were in America in June last year and I remember sitting on the bus, and I was trying to write a song and I realized that I didn't have anything to say at all, and I didn't have any feelings about anything – good feelings or bad feelings. That was a really scary for me, because I've always had lots to say, and lots of opinions whether right or wrong. We then ended up having a massive row about something a couple of days later and it came out of that that we were all feeling this sense of numbness, this feeling of kinda fading away as people. And I just tried to write about that, and it ended up becoming Crystal Ball. – Tim Rice-Oxley at Keaneshaped

== Musical structure ==
Similarly to other Keane songs such as "Somewhere Only We Know", the song follows a quaver-note driven sound. Several effects, like the aforementioned distortion piano and strings, are added through the song. The fading-in intro is often referred as a continuation to "The Iron Sea", and represented as an immediate returning to surface of the "Iron Sea". Vocals are introduced at 19 seconds and continue until fading on 3:04. The demo version included on the bonus DVD of the album would reprise the intro riff before the finale.

== B-sides ==
=== "Maybe I Can Change" ===
It was recorded at the Magic Shop Studios in New York City. It was first known by a shot on the Under the Iron Sea DVD, as well as in the June issue of Q Magazine. It is rumoured amongst the band's fanbase that this song may have been composed by Chaplin as a response to Rice-Oxley's "Hamburg Song" and "Broken Toy". In May 2015, Chaplin tweeted that it was Rice-Oxley that wrote the song.

=== "The Iron Sea: Magic Shop Version" ===
This version, recorded at The Magic Shop, New York City, features drums that were not present in the album version. The recording is also extended and features an immediate intro.

== Music video ==
The music video for "Crystal Ball" was released by NME on 4 August 2006 and features the American actor Giovanni Ribisi. The director was Giuseppe Capotondi. It is about an estate agent losing his identity. A woman is helping her husband and young son get ready to leave the house. He then gets into his car and drives off with his son. The man gets to his office and warmly interacts with a secretary. He shows off a house to a couple, implying that he is a real estate agent, and working in the office.

When the real estate agent returns to his house, he finds a red car parked outside. His keys do not work, so he knocks on the door and rings the bell. His wife partially opens the door and looks surprised. A man appears behind the wife and the agent speaks with a look of disbelief and the wife shuts the door. The agent looks in house and frightens the son. The agent explains the situation to a police officer as the man and his wife talk to another officer. The agent is ushered away and drives away in his car.

After making phone calls and wandering around, the man wakes up in his car in the parking lot of his office. He walks into the office and finds the man sitting at his desk. He begins to argue with him and stops when he sees that the photographs on his desk now show the other man with his family. When the man is thrown out of the building, someone runs toward his car. He runs to the car claiming that the car belongs to him, but the person drives the car away, leaving the man confused and defeated. The story is intercut with footage of the band playing together in a room.

The video was also recycled for the US release video for the single "Nothing in My Way", albeit with the band footage removed and subtitles added. At around the time of this single release it was announced that Tom Chaplin had gone into rehab for 'drug and alcohol addiction'. It is noticeable that the original video does not feature any close up shots of Chaplin, but several of Tim Rice-Oxley and Richard Hughes, though it is unknown whether this is deliberate.

== Cover art ==
The cover art designed by Sanna Annukka is also found in the inner pages of the Under the Iron Sea DVD. The CD box is similar to the one containing "Is It Any Wonder?", made out of recycled materials.

== Track listings ==
UK CD single

1. "Crystal Ball"
2. "Maybe I Can Change"
3. "The Iron Sea: Magic Shop Version"

UK limited-edition 7-inch single

A. "Crystal Ball"
B. "Maybe I Can Change"

== Charts ==
=== Weekly charts ===
Chart (2006)	Peak position
Belgium (Ultratop 50 Flanders)	38
Belgium (Ultratip Bubbling Under Wallonia)	3
Czech Republic Airplay (ČNS IFPI)	79
France (SNEP)	60
Germany (GfK)	64
Hungary (Editors' Choice Top 40)	37
Ireland (IRMA)	41
Netherlands (Dutch Top 40)	20
Netherlands (Single Top 100)	36
Scotland Singles (OCC)	21
Slovakia Airplay (ČNS IFPI)	2
UK Singles (OCC)	20

=== Year-end charts ===
Chart (2006)	Position
Netherlands (Dutch Top 40)	98

== Certifications ==
Region	Certification	Certified units/sales
Denmark (IFPI Danmark)	Gold	4,000^{^}
^{^} Shipments figures based on certification alone.
