= Zulu Winter =

British rock band

- Origin: London, England
- Genres: Indie rock
- Years active: 2011–2014
- Label: Play It Again Sam
- Members: Will Daunt; Iain Lock; Dom Millard; Henry Walton; Guy Henderson
- Website: web.archive.org/web/20120815030528/http://www.zuluwinter.com:80/

Zulu Winter were a five-piece indie rock band formed in London in 2011. The band consisted of Will Daunt (vocals & guitar), Iain Lock (backing vocals and bass), Dom Millard (keyboards), Henry Walton (guitar) and Guy Henderson (drums).

They released their first single, "Never Leave", on Double Denim Records on 7 November 2011, Later the same week the band played a BBC Radio 6 introducing session at Maida Vale for Steve Lamacq, playing their first single "Never Leave", B-side "Let's Move Back To Front" and other tracks from their forthcoming album. The band subsequently signed to Play It Again Sam, a part of PIAS Entertainment Group.

Their second single "We Should Be Swimming" was released in February 2012 and was Zane Lowe's Hottest Record In The World on his BBC Radio 1 show, on 11 January 2012. The band received various features in the UK press, including a two-page spread in Q (magazine), "New Band Of The Day" on The Guardian website and a mention in the Independent's "Music One's To Watch Lists: This millennium’s school yard brawl". The band were also chosen by Mumford & Sons as an act for the Galway leg of the Gentleman of the Road festival in June 2012.

In March 2012, the UK Band, Keane, announced Zulu Winter as the support act on their 2012 UK Strangeland Tour. The band released their third single "Silver Tongue" in April 2012 which was once again made Zane Lowe's Hottest Record In The World on his BBC Radio 1 show.

The band released their debut album Language on 14 May 2012 on Play It Again Sam, which was received very well in both the UK and the US. The band also won Steve Lamacq's Rebel Playlist competition on his BBC 6 Music radio show, where the band's latest single, "Key To My Heart" was voted to get played on each daytime programme the following week.

Zulu Winter played a number of festivals in Britain and elsewhere in Europe in 2012, including Reading and Leeds, T in the Park, Secret Garden, Pukkelpop, Lowlands, the Isle of Wight and Bestival. The band also toured extensively throughout 2012/13, supporting The Vaccines on a European tour in the spring of 2012, and playing SXSW in Austin and NXNE in Toronto.

On 5 June 2014, the band announced they had split after playing together for nearly 15 years, via their Facebook page. A mini-album of studio and home recordings which the band "didn't want to fester on a hard drive somewhere", was released on 21 July 2014 under the title Stutter on Fierce Panda Records. Half the tracks were studio produced while the other were self-produced. NME's Jeremy Allen reviewed the album; "To be fair, it’s glossy and cohesive for an outtakes record, but aside from the subtle, groove-laden title track, nothing here really competes for your attention. Now is the winter of their discontent.", with a score of 5/10.

== Discography ==
Albums

- Language (Play It Again Sam, 2012)
- Stutter (Mini-Album) (Fierce Panda, 2014)

Singles

- "Never Leave" / "Let's Move Back To Front" (Double Denim Records, 2011)
- "We Should Be Swimming" (Play It Again Sam, 2012)
- "Silver Tongue" (Play It Again Sam, 2012)
- "Key To My Heart" (Play It Again Sam, 2012)
- "Key To My Heart" (3D M4n Remix)
