= Stop for a Minute (Keane song) =

2010 single by Keane

Single by Keane featuring K'naan

from the EP Night Train
- Released: 5 April 2010
- Genre: Pop
- Length: 4:07 (album version); 3:42 (radio edit - with rap); 3:35 (radio edit - without rap)
- Label: Island
- Songwriters: Tom Chaplin; Richard Hughes; Tim Rice-Oxley; K'naan
- Producers: Keane; Fraser T Smith

Keane singles chronology
"Better than This" (2009)	"Stop for a Minute" (2010)	"Silenced by the Night" (2012)

K'naan singles chronology
"Wavin' Flag" (2009)	"Stop for a Minute" (2010)	"Wavin' Flag" (Coca-Cola Celebration Mix) (2010)

Music video
- "Stop for a Minute" on YouTube

"Stop for a Minute" is the only single from Keane's 2010 EP, and fourth record, Night Train. The song marks Keane's collaboration with Somali-Canadian rapper, K'naan. The single was released on 5 April 2010 in the United Kingdom and on 11 April 2010 in the United States. The song is featured on the soundtrack of Pro Evolution Soccer 2011.

== Music video ==
The video begins with shots of a Bethnal Green Road, London. Keane frontman Tom Chaplin and K'naan are shown singing in the bar while surrounded by patrons enjoying their night, a contrast to some of the song's lyrics.

== Track listing ==
Digital download
No.	Title	Length
1.	"Stop for a Minute"	4:06

== Charts ==
The song debuted at number forty on the UK Singles Charts, making their tenth top-forty hit and their highest chart single since Spiralling.

=== Weekly charts ===
Chart (2010)	Peak position
Belgium (Ultratop 50 Flanders)	31
Belgium (Ultratop 50 Wallonia)	14
Denmark Airplay (Tracklisten)	15
European Hot 100	74
Ireland (IRMA)	27
Japan (Japan Hot 100)	80
Netherlands (Dutch Top 40)	14
Netherlands (Single Top 100)	35
UK Singles (OCC)	40
UK Hip Hop/R&B (OCC)	14

=== Year-end charts ===
Chart (2010)	Peak position
Italy Airplay (EarOne)	51
Netherlands (Dutch Top 40)	59

== Release history ==
Country	Date
United Kingdom	5 May 2010 (digital)
United Kingdom	10 May 2010 (physical)
United States	11 May 2010
