= Quicksand (Tom Chaplin song) =

Single by Tom Chaplin

from the album The Wave
- Released: 26 August 2016
- Genre: Pop
- Length: 4:03
- Label: Island
- Songwriter(s): Tom Chaplin; Matt Hales
- Producer(s): Chaplin; Hales

Tom Chaplin singles chronology
"Quicksand" (2016)	"Still Waiting" (2016)

"Quicksand" is a song by British singer Tom Chaplin. It was released on 26 August 2016 as the first single from his first studio album, The Wave (2016), where it appears as the eighth track. Chaplin wrote the song for his daughter Freya.

== Music video ==
A music video for the song became available to view on YouTube on August 25, 2016 as its worldwide release.

== Track listing ==
Digital download
No.	Title	Length
1.	"Quicksand"	4:03

== Charts ==
Chart (2016)	Peak position
Scotland (OCC)	56
UK Singles Downloads (OCC)	55

== Release history ==
Country	Date	Format	Label	Ref.
Worldwide	26 August 2016	Digital download	Island	
