= Midpoint (album) =

Studio album by Tom Chaplin
- Released: 2 September 2022
- Recorded: 2021–2022
- Studios: Real World; The Church
- Length: 61:51
- Label: BMG
- Producers: Ethan Johns; Matt Hales

Tom Chaplin chronology
Twelve Tales of Christmas (2017)	Midpoint (2022)

Singles from Midpoint
- 1. "Midpoint" Released: 6 July 2022; 2. "Gravitational" Released: 20 July 2022; 3. "Overshoot" Released: 29 September 2022

Midpoint is the third solo studio album by the English singer-songwriter Tom Chaplin. The album was released on 2 September 2022 by BMG.

== Track listing ==
All tracks are written by Tom Chaplin and Tobie Tripp, except where noted.

No.	Title	Length
1.	"All Fall Down" (Tom Chaplin, Tobie Tripp, Ethan Johns, Neil Cowley)	4:36
2.	"Rise and Fall"	4:34
3.	"Black Hole"	3:38
4.	"Stars Align"	4:53
5.	"Colourful Light" (Chaplin, Tripp, Johns, Cowley)	4:24
6.	"Gonna Run"	3:46
7.	"It's Over" (Chaplin)	3:18
8.	"Midpoint"	4:53
9.	"Panoramic Eyes"	4:08
10.	"Gravitational" (Chaplin, Matt Hales)	6:03
11.	"New Flowers"	3:25
12.	"Cameo"	3:27
13.	"Overshoot" (Chaplin, Hales)	4:02
Total length:		55:13

Bonus track
No.	Title	Length
14.	"Gravitational" (edit)	3:31
15.	"Overshoot" (edit)	3:07

== Charts ==
Chart performance for Midpoint
Chart (2022)	Peak position
Belgian Albums (Ultratop Wallonia)	187
Scottish Albums (Official Charts)	13
UK Albums (Official Charts)	19
UK Independent Albums (Official Charts)	1

== See also ==
- List of UK Independent Albums Chart number ones of 2022
