= Nothing in My Way =

2006 single by Keane

Single by Keane

from the album Under the Iron Sea
- B-side: "Thin Air"; "Tyderian"
- Released: 30 October 2006
- Studio: Heliocentric (Rye, East Sussex); Magic Shop (New York City)
- Length: 4:00
- Label: Island
- Songwriters: Tim Rice-Oxley; Tom Chaplin; Richard Hughes
- Producer: Andy Green

Keane singles chronology
"Crystal Ball" (2006)	"Nothing in My Way" (2006)	"A Bad Dream" (2007)

"Nothing in My Way" is a song performed and composed by English alternative rock band Keane for their second studio album Under the Iron Sea (2006). The song was also released 30 October 2006 as the third commercial and fourth overall single from that album in the United Kingdom. After the French pop rock band Bubblies, the single's release is notable as being the first ever commercial music release in USB format, a special edition limited to 1,500 copies.

== Background and composition ==
"Nothing in My Way" was composed by Tim Rice-Oxley in late 2004 and was recorded and at the Heliosentric Studios, Rye, East Sussex and at The Magic Shop, New York City in late 2005. It debuted at the Rolling Stone Roadshow in Germany along with "Hamburg Song" on 20 October 2004. From 2004 to late 2005 (during the final sprint of the Hopes and Fears Tour) was called "Nothing in Your Way" though the lyrics remain almost the same. Rice-Oxley gave this meaning on 16 May 2006:

"Nothing in My Way" came out of listening to a lot of the poppier end of hiphop on the radio, just kinda driving around and I think particularly the groove of "Lose Yourself" by Eminem got stuck in my head (...) and I guess I liked the idea of trying to do something similar. I guess it was never gonna sound like Eminem, but the groove of it was basically lifted from that, and the song just came from jamming around on a piano. So I guess as a result of all that, I guess it's a much funkier and kinda 'blacker' song than most Keane songs, and that was something that we really wanted to get into the record generally. We were listening to a lot of classic motown as well, much more driving rhythms and you can hear that in a lot of the songs (...) The song's actually written about some people I know who are married, and their marriage was essentially just bringing a lot of misery to both of them, but for some reason they just refused to acknowledge it. I hate the idea of people being so much in denial that they're prepared to almost let their lives fall apart rather than acknowledge what's going on.

While the first demos and performances of the song were played in the key of C, the final studio version was recorded with a C sharp tuned 20 cents above. For live performances this configuration is used too.

The song is reminiscent of "Somewhere Only We Know" due to the similar piano "hammering" rhythm, which features a distorted piano on top in the intro. The outro repeats the line "For a lonely soul, you're havin' such a nice time" as Rice-Oxley and Hughes join in on backing vocals, and Chaplin plays his Hammond organ.

== B-sides ==
=== "Thin Air" ===
This song was originally listed on Under the Iron Sea but was later dropped. It was also set to appear on the second single "This Is the Last Time", which could mean it was composed sometime in 2004. The song supposedly talks again about the Rice-Oxley-Chaplin relationship.

=== "Tyderian" ===
This is Keane's second instrumental, after "The Iron Sea". It has an unusual house-styled dance rhythm never seen before in their material. "Tyderian" is also Keane's first song totally produced, composed, recorded and mixed only by Rice-Oxley, and was recorded at his home.

== Music video ==
The music video for "Nothing in My Way" is a live performance shot at ULU directed by Dick Carruthers and produced by Kit Hawkins for White House Pictures.

The US release music video for "Nothing in My Way" is the identical video for the UK single "Crystal Ball", without clips of the band interspersed through the story, and with subtitles added. At around the time of this single release it was announced that Tom Chaplin had gone into rehab for 'drug and alcohol addiction'. It is noticeable that the original video does not feature any close up shots of Chaplin, but several of Tim Rice-Oxley and Richard Hughes, though it is unknown whether this is deliberate.

== Track listing ==
CD single

Catalogue number: 1712175

1. "Nothing in My Way"
2. "Thin Air"
3. "Tyderian"

UK 7" vinyl

Catalogue number: 1712200

1. "Nothing in My Way"
2. "Thin Air"

512 MB USB memory stick content

  - "Nothing in My Way" (Audio)
  - "Nothing in My Way" (Video)
  - Three screensavers: Tube animations by Corin Hardy
  - Link to special page on the website to view an alternative version of "Nothing in My Way" (including a competition to see the band in the US next year)

== Charts ==
=== Weekly charts ===
Weekly chart performance for "Nothing in My Way"
Chart (2006–2007)	Peak position
Belgium (Ultratip Bubbling Under Flanders)	2
Belgium (Ultratip Bubbling Under Wallonia)	8
Netherlands (Dutch Top 40)	27
Netherlands (Single Top 100)	56
Scotland Singles (Official Charts)	34
UK Singles (Official Charts)	19
US Adult Alternative Airplay (Billboard)	6

=== Year-end charts ===
Year-end chart rankings for "Nothing in My Way"
Chart (2006)	Position
Netherlands (Dutch Top 40)	181
