= Under the Iron Sea =

2006 album by Keane

Studio album by Keane
- Released: 12 June 2006
- Recorded: August 2004 – February 2006
- Studios: Helioscentric, Rye, East Sussex, England; Magic Shop, New York City
- Genres: Alternative rock; pop rock
- Length: 50:30
- Label: Island
- Producers: Andy Green; Keane

Keane chronology
Hopes and Fears (2004)	Under the Iron Sea (2006)	Perfect Symmetry (2008)

Alternative cover
- Cover for release with UK bonus DVD

Singles from Under the Iron Sea
- 1. "Atlantic" Released: 24 April 2006; 2. "Is It Any Wonder?" Released: 29 May 2006; 3. "Crystal Ball" Released: 21 August 2006; 4. "Nothing in My Way" Released: 30 October 2006; 5. "A Bad Dream" Released: 22 January 2007; 6. "Try Again" Released: 9 February 2007

Under the Iron Sea is the second studio album by the English rock band Keane, released on 12 June 2006. During its first week on sale in the UK, the album opened at number one, selling 222,297 copies according to figures from the Official Chart Company. In the United States, the album debuted at number four on the Billboard 200, selling 75,000 copies in its first week there. Since its release, the album has sold over three million copies worldwide.

The band describes Under the Iron Sea as a progression from Hopes and Fears, with electronic influences, and as a "sinister fairytale-world-gone-wrong".

== Background and development ==
After the release of their debut album, Hopes and Fears, Keane embarked upon a world tour, which reached virtually all Europe and North America and which concluded in October 2005. As seen on Strangers, the band had been having trouble since the middle of 2004, shortly after the release of the debut. "Hamburg Song", composed circa August 2004, deals with the strained relationship between singer Tom Chaplin and pianist Tim Rice-Oxley. During the tour, Rice-Oxley kept composing new songs that would later appear on future releases, such as the B-sides "Let It Slide" and "Thin Air". According to Chaplin, Rice-Oxley had composed at least 50 tracks as of April 2006.

The name of the album is based on a lyric in the track "Crystal Ball", which reads "I've lost my heart, I buried it too deep, under the Iron Sea". It also shares its title with the eighth track, "The Iron Sea", Keane's first instrumental piece. The "Iron Sea" is the metaphorical name for the group's (especially Rice-Oxley's) preoccupations about their uncertain future and the sudden fame they had to deal with.

The album's title was announced by a handwritten note, signed by the entire band, reading:

Hello everyone, we just wanted to let you know that our new album is called "under the iron sea" and will be out on June 12th. Tom Tim Rich

"Nothing in My Way" (previously known as "Nothing in Your Way"), "Try Again" and "Hamburg Song" debuted between late 2004 and 2005 during the Hopes and Fears Tour. The latter two songs made their first appearance on Strangers, still in demo versions, while the first only appeared until the album's release. The first three singles, "Atlantic", "Is It Any Wonder?" and "Crystal Ball", were premiered at a secret gig in London on 5 April.

Notable changes from the previous releases by Keane during the Hopes and Fears era are the typeface and style of the cover art. Sanna Annukka, an artist from Brighton, designed the cover art for the album and its singles. The typeface changed from the "Cochin" typeface used on the 2004 and 2005 releases. The newer font was specially designed for Keane (but no specific name for the font was given apart from the "UTIS" fan-name).

== Composition ==
The album opens with "Atlantic", the first single from the album. The track expresses fear of aging, set to Rice-Oxley's layers of electric piano and synthesizer strings. It was featured in the TV series CSI: NY in the eighth episode of the third season, "Consequences". "Is It Any Wonder" is composed of pianos fed with distortion pedals and was written about the Iraq War."Nothing in My Way" was described as "catchy" and "gently lifting". It is featured on the soundtrack for FIFA 07.

"Leaving So Soon?" is considered a fan favourite and is the most uptempo song on the album at 144 BPM. "A Bad Dream" was described as an "enchanting tune" with density and drama. The slowest song on the album "Hamburg Song" is about personal conflicts between Rice-Oxley and Chaplin and features solely piano and organ as its instrumentation, with drums being absent besides some light ride hits at the end. "Put It Behind You" was primarily written by drummer Richard Hughes in mid-2004 after breaking up with his girlfriend.

"The Iron Sea" is Keane's first instrumental track, followed by "Crystal Ball" which has been compared to "early electro U2" and featured Chaplin's "swooning chorus". "Try Again", a downbeat track was noted for its "pristine sound and hushed majesty" and features Chaplin's distortion piano in the outro. "Broken Toy", the longest song in Keane's discography is a jazz-influenced track in 9/8 time and has been compared to Radiohead's "Pyramid Song". The closing track "The Frog Prince" was written about another musician who Rice-Oxley described as 'talented, but very arrogant'.

== Release and promotion ==
The first pre-release before the album was "Atlantic", which was issued as a download-only music video single on 25 April, featuring a specially extended version of the song incorporating the outro from album track "The Iron Sea". Irvine Welsh, author of the novel Trainspotting, directed the video, which was filmed in black and white on a remote Sussex beach, and did not feature the band. "Is It Any Wonder?" followed as the first single proper on 29 May. Its video was directed by Kevin Godley, best known for his work on music videos for The Police and Duran Duran in the mid-1980s.

The record was released on 12 June 2006 internationally. However, the album was accidentally put on sale for a few hours on 2 June 2006 by Apple Computer's Belgian iTunes Music Store. A US edition of the album eventually leaked in its entirety to file-sharing networks on 5 June 2006, and the Mexican edition was released early on 9 June.

The release was accompanied by a bonus DVD with a book-shaped cover representing a fairy-tale story, with drawings on the inner pages.

== Reception ==
Professional ratings
Aggregate scores
Source	Rating
Metacritic	63/100
Review scores
Source	Rating
AllMusic	4.5/5 stars
The A.V. Club	B−
Entertainment Weekly	A−
The Guardian	3/5 stars
The Irish Times	4/5 stars
Mojo	3/5 stars
Pitchfork	4.1/10
Q	4/5 stars
Rolling Stone	3/5 stars
Spin	3/5 stars

Under the Iron Sea received generally favourable reviews from critics. Review aggregating website Metacritic reports a normalised score of 63/100, based on 24 reviews, indicating "generally favorable" reviews.

In 2008, Under the Iron Sea was voted the 8th best British album of all time by a poll conducted by Q Magazine and HMV.

== Track listing ==
All tracks are written by Tom Chaplin, Tim Rice-Oxley and Richard Hughes.

UK version
No.	Title	Length
1.	"Atlantic"	4:13
2.	"Is It Any Wonder?"	3:06
3.	"Nothing in My Way"	4:00
4.	"Leaving So Soon?"	3:59
5.	"A Bad Dream"	5:06
6.	"Hamburg Song"	4:37
7.	"Put It Behind You"	3:36
8.	"The Iron Sea"	2:57
9.	"Crystal Ball"	3:53
10.	"Try Again"	4:27
11.	"Broken Toy"	6:07
12.	"The Frog Prince"	4:22

International version
No.	Title	Length
1.	"Atlantic"	4:13
2.	"Is It Any Wonder?"	3:06
3.	"Nothing in My Way"	4:00
4.	"Leaving So Soon?"	3:59
5.	"A Bad Dream"	5:06
6.	"Hamburg Song"	4:37
7.	"Put It Behind You/The Iron Sea"	6:33
8.	"Crystal Ball"	3:53
9.	"Try Again"	4:27
10.	"Broken Toy"	6:07
11.	"The Frog Prince"	4:22
12.	"Let It Slide" (Japanese bonus track)	4:12

=== Bonus DVD ===
==== Videos ====
1. Recording Under the Iron Sea – 23:55
2. Short film set to an extended version of "Atlantic" – 6:01
3. "Is It Any Wonder?" (video) – 3:01
4. Making the Is It Any Wonder? Video – 7:50

==== Works in progress ====
1. "Atlantic" (demo 29 January 2005) – 4:15
2. "Is It Any Wonder?" (demo 31 March 2005) – 2:58
3. "Nothing in My Way" (live from Aragon Theater, Chicago 19 May 2005) – 4:10
4. "Leaving So Soon?" (demo 29 October 2005)
5. "A Bad Dream" (demo 7 July 2005)
6. "Hamburg Song" (live from Aragon Theater, Chicago 19 May 2005)
7. "Put It Behind You" (demo 9 January 2005)
8. "The Iron Sea" (Helioscentric recording session 9 April 2005)
9. "Crystal Ball" (demo 7 July 2005)
10. "Try Again" (live from Aragon Theater, Chicago 19 May 2005)
11. "Broken Toy" (demo 30 August 2005) – 5:39
12. "The Frog Prince" (demo 7 July 2005) – 3:44

=== Latin American tour edition bonus DVD ===
1. "Atlantic" (video)
2. "Is It Any Wonder?" (video)
3. "Crystal Ball" (video)
4. "Nothing in My Way" (video)
5. "A Bad Dream" (video)
6. The Making of 'Is It Any Wonder?' (video)

=== Taiwanese limited edition bonus DVD ===
1. "Is It Any Wonder?" (video)
2. "Crystal Ball" (band version)
3. "Nothing in My Way" (video)
4. "Atlantic" (video)
5. The Making of 'Is It Any Wonder?' (video)

== Hidden content ==
Inserting the CD whilst on the band's allows one to unlock exclusive content including:

- Original demo of "Atlantic"
- A live recording of "Is It Any Wonder?"
- Live video footage of "Atlantic" from the show at ULU
- A free ringtone of "The Iron Sea" for mobile download (UK consumers only)
- Wallpaper images
- An exclusive Keane screensaver

== Personnel ==
Keane

- Tom Chaplin – lead vocals, organ, piano, guitar
- Tim Rice-Oxley – piano, bass guitar, keyboards, synthesizers, composition, backing vocals
- Richard Hughes – drums, percussion, backing vocals

Additional personnel

- Andy Green – production, programming and engineering
- Julian Willmott – additional engineering and Pro Tools editing
- Mark "Spike" Stent – mixing
- Alex Dromgoole – mixing assistance
- David Emery – additional mixing assistance
- Ted Jensen – mastering (at Sterling Sound)
- Sanna Annukka – cover design
- Richard Andrews – art direction (for Big Active)
- Gerard Saint – art direction (for Big Active)

== Charts ==
=== Weekly charts ===
Chart (2006)	Peak position
Australian Albums (ARIA)	16
Austrian Albums (Ö3 Austria)	4
Belgian Albums (Ultratop Flanders)	3
Belgian Albums (Ultratop Wallonia)	4
Canadian Albums (Billboard)	7
Danish Albums (Hitlisten)	5
Dutch Albums (Album Top 100)	1
European Albums (Billboard)	1
Finnish Albums (Suomen virallinen lista)	8
French Albums (SNEP)	8
German Albums (Offizielle Top 100)	3
Greek International Albums (IFPI)	1
Hungarian Albums (MAHASZ)	21
Irish Albums (IRMA)	1
Italian Albums (FIMI)	10
Mexican Albums (Top 100 Mexico)	65
New Zealand Albums (RMNZ)	5
Norwegian Albums (VG-lista)	3
Portuguese Albums (AFP)	3
Spanish Albums (Promusicae)	3
Swedish Albums (Sverigetopplistan)	4
Swiss Albums (Schweizer Hitparade)	2
UK Albums (Official Charts)	1
US Billboard 200	4

=== Year-end charts ===
Chart (2006)	Position
Belgian Albums (Ultratop Flanders)	45
Belgian Albums (Ultratop Wallonia)	43
Dutch Albums (Album Top 100)	26
European Albums (Billboard)	38
French Albums (SNEP)	125
German Albums (Offizielle Top 100)	63
Swiss Albums (Schweizer Hitparade)	59
UK Albums (OCC)	14

Chart (2007)	Position
UK Albums (OCC)	112

== Certifications ==
Region	Certification	Certified units/sales
Argentina (CAPIF)	Gold	20,000^{^}
Denmark (IFPI Danmark)	Gold	20,000^{^}
Germany (BVMI)	Gold	100,000^{‡}
Ireland (IRMA)	Platinum	15,000^{^}
Netherlands (NVPI)	Gold	35,000^{^}
Portugal (AFP)	Gold	10,000^{^}
Spain (Promusicae)	Gold	40,000^{^}
Switzerland (IFPI Switzerland)	Gold	15,000^{^}
United Kingdom (BPI)	3× Platinum	904,798
United States (RIAA)	Gold	500,000^{‡}
Summaries
Europe (IFPI)	Platinum	1,000,000^{*}
^{*} Sales figures based on certification alone.^{^} Shipments figures based on certification alone.^{‡} Sales+streaming figures based on certification alone.

== See also ==
- List of songs by Keane
