= The Wave (album) =

Studio album by Tom Chaplin
- Released: 14 October 2016
- Recorded: January–June 2016
- Studios: Pasadena, California and London, England
- Length: 42:39
- Label: Island
- Producer: Matt Hales

Tom Chaplin chronology
The Wave (2016)	Twelve Tales of Christmas (2017)

Singles from The Wave
- 1. "Quicksand" Released: 26 August 2016; 2. "Still Waiting" Released: 16 January 2017; 3. "Solid Gold" Released: 17 March 2017; 4. "See It So Clear" Released: 14 April 2017

Professional ratings
Aggregate scores
Source	Rating
Metacritic	72/100
Review scores
Source	Rating
AllMusic	4/5 stars
The Guardian	3/5 stars
Evening Standard	4/5 stars

The Wave is the debut solo studio album by the English singer-songwriter Tom Chaplin. The album was released on 14 October 2016 by Island Records.

== Background ==
It is Chaplin's first solo album since Keane announced their hiatus in 2013, and Chaplin has called the process of recording a solo album a "daunting prospect for someone who knows nothing else".

After the band members began new projects, Chaplin began using drugs due to anxiety over the album and "thought [he] was going to die" in early 2015: "When I finally liberated myself from years of spiraling addiction, a place of inspiration and creativity became available to me. I set about writing an album that documents my transition from the darkest recesses of human experience to a place of resolution, fulfillment and happiness. At long last I am comfortable in my own skin and have achieved that elusive dream of writing a set of songs I can truly call my own."

== Tour ==
On 5 September 2016, Chaplin announced his first solo tour to accompany the release of the album. The tour was described as "a run of intimate club shows", which ran between 23 October and 31 October 2016 consisting of eight shows, visiting Brighton, Bristol, Nottingham, Leeds, Manchester, Glasgow, Birmingham and Islington in London.

These shows were followed in 2017 by the Carried By The Wave Tour, which visited the US and Canada and venues throughout western Europe before returning to the UK. Chaplin announced the dates and venues of the UK leg via his Facebook page on 23 October 2016, with tickets going on sale four days later and a second date at the De La Warr Pavilion in Bexhill being added to the list on 31 October, after the first date sold out. Chaplin was supported on the UK leg of the tour by Australian singer-songwriter Ainslie Wills.

On 14 November 2016 the dates for the US and Canada leg were announced, three days prior to tickets going on sale.

On 6 December the dates for the European leg were announced, and tickets for these shows went on sale on 9 December.

== Music videos ==
The first video from the album was for "Hardened Heart", which became available to view on 12 August 2016. The album's first single, "Quicksand" was released accompanied by a music video on 26 August.

A video of an acoustic version of "Quicksand" also became available to view prior to the release of the album, which was followed by acoustic videos of the tracks "Hold On to Our Love" and "Still Waiting".

A video for "Still Waiting" became available to view on YouTube on 20 January 2017 to mark its official release as a single.

On 17 March 2017, a video for a new version of "Solid Gold" performed by Chaplin in collaboration with JONES was released, alongside its release as a single on iTunes.

== Singles ==
"Quicksand" was released as the first single from the album, on 26 August 2016.

After the commencement of the opening leg of the Carried by the Wave Tour, across North America, the album's opening track "Still Waiting" was officially released as a single, on 20 January 2017.

In March 2017, Chaplin announced that the album version of "Solid Gold" had been re-recorded for release as a single, with the new version featuring a collaboration between Chaplin and British singer-songwriter JONES. The new collaboration was released as a digital download single on 17 March 2017.

Two other tracks were sold prior to the album's release - "Hardened Heart" and "Hold On to Our Love" - though these were not released as radio singles.

== Track listing ==
No.	Title	Writer(s)	Length
1.	"Still Waiting"	Tom Chaplin; Dan Heath	3:51
2.	"Hardened Heart"	Chaplin; Max McElligott	3:44
3.	"The River"	Chaplin; Matt Hales	4:12
4.	"Worthless Words"	Chaplin; Hales	3:05
5.	"I Remember You"	Chaplin	3:46
6.	"Bring the Rain"	Chaplin; McElligott	4:16
7.	"Hold On to Our Love"	Chaplin; McElligott	3:45
8.	"Quicksand"	Chaplin; Hales	4:03
9.	"Solid Gold"	Chaplin; Paul Barry; Mark Taylor	3:53
10.	"See It So Clear"	Chaplin; Hales	4:34
11.	"The Wave"	Chaplin; David Kosten	3:24
Total length:			42:39

Deluxe version (bonus tracks)
No.	Title	Writer(s)	Producer(s)	Length
12.	"Better Way"	Chaplin; Jim Eliot	Chaplin; McElligott	4:10
13.	"Turning Back"	Chaplin	Chaplin; McElligott	3:32
14.	"Love Wins"	Chaplin	Chaplin; McElligott	3:58
15.	"Cheating Death"	Chaplin	Chaplin; McElligott	4:15
16.	"Bound Together"	Chaplin; Matt Morris	Chaplin; Morris	3:21
Total length:				61:57

== Personnel ==
- Tom Chaplin – lead vocals, guitar, keyboards
- Matt Werry – bass, backing vocals
- Drake Putishold – drums
- Matt Hales – productions

== Charts ==
Chart (2016)	Peak position
Belgian Albums (Ultratop Flanders)	37
Belgian Albums (Ultratop Wallonia)	34
Dutch Albums (Album Top 100)	31
French Albums (SNEP)	139
German Albums (Offizielle Top 100)	76
Irish Albums (IRMA)	26
Scottish Albums (Official Charts)	5
Spanish Albums (PROMUSICAE)	35
Swiss Albums (Schweizer Hitparade)	84
UK Albums (Official Charts)	3

== Certifications ==
Region	Certification	Certified units/sales
United Kingdom (BPI)	Silver	60,000^{‡}
^{‡} Sales+streaming figures based on certification alone.

== Release history ==
Region	Date	Format	Label	Catalog no.
Worldwide	14 October 2016	CD; digital download; 12" vinyl	Island	B01K60KKEO
