= Twelve Tales of Christmas =

Studio album by Tom Chaplin
- Released: 17 November 2017
- Recorded: 2017
- Studio: Abbey Road Studios; Muttley Ranch; Snap Studios
- Genre: Christmas
- Length: 43:21
- Label: Island
- Producer: David Kosten

Tom Chaplin chronology
The Wave (2016)	Twelve Tales of Christmas (2017)	Midpoint (2022)

Professional ratings
Review scores
Source	Rating
AllMusic	3/5 stars
The Independent	3/5 stars

Twelve Tales of Christmas is a Christmas-themed solo studio album by the English singer-songwriter Tom Chaplin. The album was released on 17 November 2017 by Island Records.

It is Chaplin's second solo studio album, following on from the release of his debut album The Wave in 2016, as well as the five studio albums he had recorded as the lead singer of Keane.

== Background ==
On 13 October 2017, Chaplin announced that he had recorded his first solo Christmas album, entitled Twelve Tales of Christmas, to be released on 17 November 2017. Simultaneously the first single from the album was released, entitled "Under a Million Lights".

The album consists of eight original tracks and four cover versions: "Walking in the Air" (written by Howard Blake), "2000 Miles" (originally by The Pretenders), "River" (originally by Joni Mitchell) and "Stay Another Day" (originally by East 17).

It was also announced that Chaplin would perform three gigs to accompany the release of the album; at the Palace Theatre in Manchester on 10 December 2017 at The Forum in Bath on 11 December and at the Royal Festival Hall in London on 12 December.

== Track listing ==
No.	Title	Writer(s)	Length
1.	"Walking in the Air"	Howard Blake	3:54
2.	"Midnight Mass"	Tom Chaplin; Matt Hales	3:24
3.	"2000 Miles"	Christine Hynde	3:06
4.	"Under a Million Lights"	Chaplin; Hales	3:22
5.	"River"	Roberta Mitchell	5:16
6.	"London Lights"	Chaplin; Tom Hobden; Fred Abbott	3:04
7.	"We Remember You This Christmas"	Chaplin; Hobden; Abbott	3:05
8.	"Stay Another Day"	Anthony Mortimer; Robert Kean; Dominic Hawken	3:46
9.	"For the Lost"	Chaplin	3:20
10.	"Another Lonely Christmas"	Chaplin; Max McElligott	3:38
11.	"Follow My Heart"	Chaplin	4:44
12.	"Say Goodbye"	Chaplin; Bruno Major	2:42

== Charts ==
Chart (2017)	Peak position
Scottish Albums (OCC)	28
UK Albums (OCC)	21
