= Disconnected (Keane song) =

2012 single by Keane

Single by Keane

from the album Strangeland
- Released: 27 April 2012
- Genre: Alternative rock, pop rock
- Length: 3:57
- Label: Island
- Songwriter(s): Tim Rice-Oxley, Tom Chaplin, Richard Hughes, Jesse Quin
- Producer(s): Dan Grech-Marguerat

Keane singles chronology
"Silenced by the Night" (2012)	"Disconnected" (2012)	"Sovereign Light Café" (2012)

Music video
- "Disconnected" on YouTube

"Disconnected" is a song by English alternative rock band Keane from their fourth studio album Strangeland. It was released as the album's second single on 27 April 2012 in Germany, Austria and Switzerland. The band played the song for first time during the Night Train Tour in 2010. It was released officially, worldwide, on 8 October 2012.

== Music video ==
Spanish film directors Juan Antonio Bayona and Sergio G. Sánchez co-directed the video for "Disconnected" with Leticia Dolera in the main role. Bayona, Sanchez and Keane filmed the video inside a haunted house in Barcelona, which pays homage to the '70s horror movie aesthetic. Both Bayona and Sanchez created a surreal and moving plot which tells the story of two lovers who have become detached from each other and ultimately question the notion of reality and mortality. A video teaser was shown at keanemusic.com. The teaser premiered on 16 April 2012.

"Disconnected" won Best Video at the Q Awards in London on 22 October 2012.

== Track listing ==
Germany, Austria and Switzerland digital download
No.	Title	Length
1.	"Disconnected"	3:57

Worldwide digital download
No.	Title	Length
1.	"Disconnected" (radio edit)	3:31
2.	"Sea Fog" (live from Mexico City, 30 August 2012)	3:39

== Charts ==
Chart (2012)	Peak position
Belgium (Ultratop 50 Flanders)	28
Belgium (Ultratop 50 Wallonia)	10

== Release history ==
Country	Release date	Format	Label
Austria	27 April 2012	Digital download	Island Records
Germany	27 April 2012	Digital download	Island Records
Switzerland	27 April 2012	Digital download	Island Records
Worldwide	8 October 2012	Digital download	Island Records
