= Hastings Beer and Music Festival =

British annual event

The Hastings Beer and Music Festival is a four-day event that takes place at The Oval, Hastings. It is managed by a committee made up of members of the local Hastings Round Table.

== History ==
The Hastings Beer Festival started in 1981.

In 2005, Hastings Beer and Music Festival had Keane, a local band from the nearby town of Battle, perform at the event. The 2025 Hastings Beer and Music Festival took please at The Oval on Falaise Road. It included performacnes by Dead Calm, The Cavaliers, Vexed, Blair, The Willis Duo and The Midnight Project.
