= Sovereign Light Café =

Single by Keane

from the album Strangeland
- B-side: "Difficult Child"
- Released: 23 July 2012
- Genre: Alternative rock, pop rock
- Length: 3:38 (album version); 3:28 (radio edit/The Best of Keane version)
- Label: Island
- Songwriters: Tim Rice-Oxley, Tom Chaplin, Richard Hughes, Jesse Quin
- Producer: Dan Grech-Marguerat

Keane singles chronology
"Disconnected" (2012)	"Sovereign Light Café" (2012)	"Higher Than the Sun" (2013)

Music video
- "Sovereign Light Café" on YouTube

"Sovereign Light Café" is a song by English alternative rock band Keane released as the third single from their fourth studio album, Strangeland.

The band played the song for first time during the Perfect Symmetry World Tour on 17 September 2009 in Thunder Bay Ontario. It has been a staple of Keane setlist since 2012 and the primary closing song since 2019.

The song was written with inspiration drawn from the town of Bexhill-on-Sea in East Sussex, where the café is located in real life, and also the town of Battle, where many of the roads mentioned are close to where the members of Keane grew up.

== Music video ==
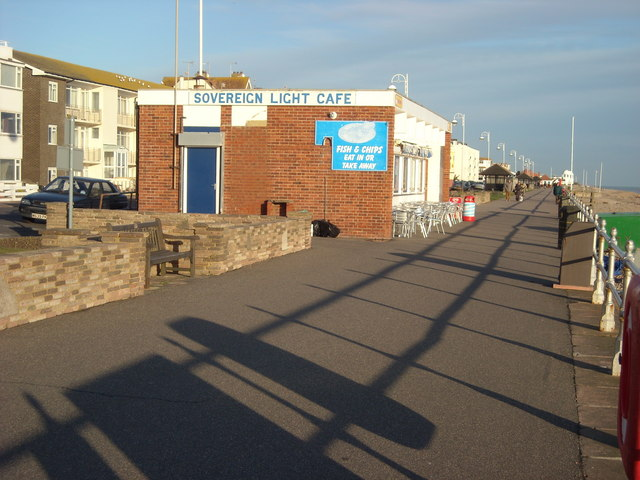
The café in 2008

The music video was premiered on 30 May 2012. It was filmed in Bexhill-on-Sea and directed by Lindy Heymann. The video shows band members strolling the town as they are surrounded by various dancers, acrobats, bicyclists and Heathfield Silver Band. The band members and all the performers meet outside the Sovereign Light Café Coffee Shop at the end of the video and it ends with a group photo.

== Track listing ==
- Digital download
1. "Sovereign Light Café" – 3:38
2. "Difficult Child" – 3:44
- Digital download – remix
1. "Sovereign Light Café" (Afrojack Remix) – 6:16

== Charts ==
=== Weekly charts ===
Weekly chart performance for "Sovereign Light Café"
Chart (2012–13)	Peak position
Belgium (Ultratip Bubbling Under Flanders)	2
Belgium (Ultratip Bubbling Under Wallonia)	4
Netherlands (Dutch Top 40) Afrojack remix	22
Netherlands (Single Top 100) Afrojack remix	29
Netherlands (Single Top 100)	71
UK Singles (Official Charts)	74
UK Download (OCC)	80
US Billboard Triple A	20

==== Year-end charts ====
2013 year-end chart performance for "Sovereign Light Café"
Chart (2013)	Position
Netherlands (Dutch Top 40) Afrojack remix	110

== Certifications ==
Certifications for "Sovereign Light Café"
Region	Certification	Certified units/sales
United Kingdom (BPI)	Silver	200,000^{‡}
^{‡} Sales+streaming figures based on certification alone.
