= Night Train (EP) =

EP by Keane

EP by Keane
- Released: 10 May 2010
- Recorded: 2009–10
- Genre: Alternative rock
- Length: 31:24
- Label: Island; Cherrytree; Interscope
- Producer: Tim Rice-Oxley

Keane chronology
| Perfect Symmetry (2008) | Night Train (2010) | Strangeland (2012) |

Singles from Night Train
- 1. "Stop for a Minute" Released: 5 April 2010

Night Train is an EP by English rock band Keane. The EP's title and material was born out of the group's Perfect Symmetry World Tour of 2008–2009.

Night Train debuted at number 1 on the UK Albums Chart.

== Recording ==
The EP was recorded in various studios during the Perfect Symmetry World tour, and mastered at Abbey Road Studios. Tracks "Stop for a Minute" and "Looking Back" mark Keane's collaboration with Somali/Canadian rapper K'Naan. "I think those tracks show us in a completely different light," says Keane frontman Tom Chaplin. "Your Love" features Tim Rice-Oxley on lead vocals. On 3 February, it was confirmed that the lead single for the EP would be "Stop for a Minute". On 8 March 2010 the song "Clear Skies" was played by Steve Lamacq on BBC 6 Music radio station, making it the first song of the EP to be played on radio. On 11 March 2010 the first single from the EP, "Stop for a Minute", made its debut on Fearne Cotton's BBC Radio 1 show. The song reached the UK Top 40.

Keane's London-based manager Adam Tudhope says the EP "may be a mix of styles and genres of music, but it's full of the hallmarks that make Keane..."

== Reception ==
Professional ratings
Aggregate scores
| Source | Rating |
|---|---|
| Metacritic | 59/100 |
Review scores
| Source | Rating |
| AllMusic | 3/5 stars |
| Entertainment Weekly | B− |
| musicOMH | 3/5 stars |
| NME | 3/10 |
| Pitchfork | 3.0/10 |
| PopMatters | 6/10 |
| Q | 4/5 stars |
| Rolling Stone | 3/5 stars |
| Slant Magazine | 2/5 stars |
| Spin | 7/10 |

Night Train has been met with mixed reviews from critics. Ryan Brockington of the New York Post's PopWrap called the work, "game changing" while writing that the first single, "Stop for a Minute", is "just as brilliant" as the album.

John Aizlewood of Q magazine called Night Train's "8 tracks and 31 minutes... surprisingly effective between-albums stop-gap".

== Track listing ==
All tracks are written by Tom Chaplin, Richard Hughes and Tim Rice-Oxley, except where noted.

Night Train track listing
| No. | Title | Writer(s) | Length |
|---|---|---|---|
| 1. | "House Lights" | | 1:23 |
| 2. | "Back in Time" | | 3:52 |
| 3. | "Stop for a Minute" (featuring K'naan) | Chaplin; Hughes; Rice-Oxley; K'naan | 4:06 |
| 4. | "Clear Skies" | | 4:53 |
| 5. | "Ishin Denshin (You've Got to Help Yourself)" (featuring Tigarah) | Peter Barakan; Haruomi Hosono; Ryuichi Sakamoto; Yukihiro Takahashi | 3:56 |
| 6. | "Your Love" | Rice-Oxley | 4:36 |
| 7. | "Looking Back" (featuring K'naan) | Chaplin; Hughes; Rice-Oxley; K'naan; Carol Connors; Bill Conti; Ayn Robbins | 3:46 |
| 8. | "My Shadow" | | 4:49 |
| Total length: | | | 31:24 |

Notes

- "Ishin Denshin (You've Got to Help Yourself)" is a cover of the Yellow Magic Orchestra song.
- "Looking Back" contains elements from "Gonna Fly Now".

== Personnel ==
Keane

- Tom Chaplin: lead vocals, guitar
- Tim Rice-Oxley: keyboards, bass guitar, guitar, percussion, lead vocals (track 6), backing vocals
- Richard Hughes: drums, percussion, backing vocals

Additional Musicians

- Jesse Quin: bass guitar, guitar, backing vocals
- Jerry Clack: brass (track 7)
- Roland Neffe: vibraphone (track 4)
- K'naan: vocals (tracks 3 and 7)
- Tigarah: vocals (track 5)

== Charts and certifications ==
The Night Train EP debuted on the UK Albums Chart on 16 May 2010 at number one with sales of 28,000 copies. The Album is certified Silver in UK selling over 60,000 copies and has sold worldwide over 160,000 copies to date.

=== Charts ===
| Chart (2010) | Peak position |
|---|---|
| Belgian Flanders Albums Chart | 27 |
| Belgian Wallonia Albums Chart | 12 |
| Canadian Albums Chart | 19 |
| Dutch Albums Chart | 9 |
| European Albums Chart | 4 |
| French Albums Chart | 45 |
| Greek Albums Chart | 3 |
| Irish Albums Chart | 15 |
| Italian Albums Chart | 4 |
| Japanese Oricon albums chart | 144 |
| Mexican Albums Chart | 23 |
| Spanish Albums Chart | 12 |
| Swedish Albums Chart | 42 |
| Swiss Albums Chart | 23 |
| UK Albums Chart | 1 |
| US Billboard 200 | 25 |

=== Sales and certifications ===
| Country | Sales | Certification |
|---|---|---|
| United Kingdom | 60,000+ | Silver |
| Worldwide | 160,000+ | |
