= Strangeland (album) =

2012 album by Keane

Studio album by Keane
- Released: 4 May 2012
- Recorded: 2011–12
- Studios: Sea Fog Studios (East Sussex, England); RAK Studios (London, England); Air Lyndhurst Hall (London, England)
- Genres: Alternative rock, indie pop
- Length: 45:08
- Label: Island
- Producer: Dan Grech-Marguerat

Keane chronology
Night Train (2010)	Strangeland (2012)	The Best of Keane (2013)

Singles from Strangeland
- 1. "Silenced by the Night" Released: 13 March 2012; 2. "Disconnected" Released: 27 April 2012; 3. "Sovereign Light Café" Released: 23 July 2012

Strangeland is the fourth studio album by English alternative rock band Keane, released on 4 May 2012 through Island Records. It is their first full-length album since Perfect Symmetry (2008), as well as the first to feature bassist Jesse Quin as an official member.

Two singles were released preceding the album's release: "Silenced by the Night" and "Disconnected". The former was released internationally on 13 March 2012, while the latter was released on 27 April 2012. The video for "Disconnected" won Best Video at the Q Awards on 22 October 2012. The album received generally mixed reviews from critics but became Keane's fifth consecutive number-one album on the UK Albums Chart.

== Background ==
"It's a very emotional album. The title track is about setting off in a certain path in life and thinking it's going to go one way, but finding out life's taken a detour. Pretty much every song on the album is about that. (But) it's a more hopeful record than it might sound!"

— Pianist Tim Rice-Oxley, on the album's themes"

Keane began working on demo tracks for Strangeland in 2010. In May 2011 the band met up with English producer Dan Grech-Marguerat, who according to Tim Rice-Oxley is "a massive Keane fan". The producer said the band wanted to "[go] back to the songwriting of their first two albums", while making an album that sounded "rich and simpler". According to Rice-Oxley, the album is inspired by The Vaccines' album What Did You Expect from the Vaccines? (2011), which was produced by Grech-Marguerat: "We loved what Dan Grech did on The Vaccines album. It had just come out. He'd also done stuff with Radiohead and produced the second Howling Bells album, which I loved."

Compared to Keane's previous full-length studio album Perfect Symmetry (2008), the album focuses more on songwriting: "We wanted it be less production led and focus on making sure that the songs were great. You write a lot of shit songs to get to the good ones." Tom Chaplin also said the sound of the album is reminiscent of earlier Keane, calling Perfect Symmetry "a bit self-indulgent".

== Critical reception ==
Professional ratings
Aggregate scores
Source	Rating
Metacritic	60/100
Review scores
Source	Rating
AllMusic	3/5 stars
Entertainment Weekly	B
Daily Express	3/5 stars
Digital Spy	3/5 stars
The Guardian	4/5 stars
Knoxville News Sentinel	4/5 stars
musicOMH	2/5 stars
NME	6/10
The Observer	3/5 stars
PopMatters	6/10

Strangeland received generally mixed reviews from music critics. At Metacritic, which assigns a normalised rating out of 100 to reviews from mainstream critics, the album received an average score of 60 based on 17 reviews, which indicates "mixed or average reviews". Chuck Campbell of the Knoxville News Sentinel stating that Strangeland features "songs [that] are more complex, their messages more complicated and the sonic nuance saturated in emphatic shine", praising producer Dan Grech-Marguerat for "giving balance to the drama and letting melody and message envelop the listeners and carry them away." Sputnikmusic gave the album three out of five, commenting that while "there is nothing overtly impressive going on in the instrumental department here (or on the entire album)", Strangeland had "varied song structures, interesting lyrical concepts, and a cohesive feel", concluding that it "is a good but not great album that will be enjoyed by fans of classic Keane."

Helen Lear from The Music wrote that Strangeland "will still sound to some like middle-of-the-road indie-pop" and "pretty much what you would expect from Keane", but "the tempo is noticeably more upbeat and the style more diverse than previous albums" and "offers some more fun in a grown-up style that may attract new fans to take a listen." Chris Roberts of the BBC criticised Strangeland as "an unabashed scurry back to the comfort zone", and that "Keane lack blood, guts and muscle", with the album ultimately classed as "a somewhat saddening step backwards." John Murphy of musicOMH rated the album two stars out of five, where "melodies are stodgy and predictable", with "a whole bucket of cliches piled in", calling Strangeland "proof positive that playing it safe is not always the best option." Ian Gittins of Virgin Media felt the album was "major musical step back from the wilful experimentalism of Perfect Symmetry, a record that saw Keane hiring dance producer Stuart Price and leaping far out of their comfort zone", commenting that the album "finds them fairly back in the middle of the road".

== Commercial performance ==
In the United Kingdom, Strangeland debuted at number one on the UK Albums Chart with first-week sales of 47,839 copies. It is Keane's fourth consecutive number-one album, a record only beaten at the time by ABBA (eight), Led Zeppelin (eight), The Beatles (seven) Oasis (seven) and Eminem (six). The album has sold over 200,000 copies in the UK, being certified gold. The album also reached number one in Ireland and the Netherlands, becoming their second number-one album in both countries. It debuted and peaked at #17 in the US.

== Singles ==
"Silenced by the Night" was released as the album's lead single worldwide except for the United Kingdom on 13 March 2012. Keane performed "Silenced by the Night" for the first time on 12 March on American talk show Jimmy Kimmel Live!. The song was sent to US adult alternative radio stations on 26 March 2012. In the United Kingdom, the single was released on 15 April 2012 after the release date had been brought forward from 30 April 2012.

The second single, "Disconnected", was released on 27 April 2012 in Germany, Switzerland and Austria.

"Sovereign Light Café" was released as the album's third single on 23 July 2012. The title is taken from, and the song influenced by, the seaside resort of Bexhill-on-Sea on the East Sussex coast not far from Battle where the band grew up. The café itself does exist on the west end of the town's seafront, opposite the offshore Sovereign Lighthouse, where it gets its name.

== Track listing ==
All tracks are written by Keane.

No.	Title	Length
1.	"You Are Young"	3:35
2.	"Silenced by the Night"	3:16
3.	"Disconnected"	3:57
4.	"Watch How You Go"	3:40
5.	"Sovereign Light Café"	3:38
6.	"On the Road"	3:56
7.	"The Starting Line"	4:12
8.	"Black Rain"	3:46
9.	"Neon River"	4:52
10.	"Day Will Come"	3:11
11.	"In Your Own Time"	3:43
12.	"Sea Fog"	3:25
Total length:		45:08

Deluxe edition additional tracks
No.	Title	Length
13.	"Strangeland"	4:36
14.	"Run with Me"	3:30
15.	"The Boys"	3:33
16.	"It's Not True"	3:49

Japanese edition additional tracks
No.	Title	Length
13.	"Strangeland"	4:36
14.	"Run with Me"	3:30
15.	"The Boys"	3:33
16.	"It's Not True"	3:49
17.	"Myth"	4:55

US iTunes Store deluxe edition additional track
No.	Title	Length
17.	"Myth"	4:55

Deluxe Box Set

Packaged in a hardback A4 size coffee table book, the Deluxe Box Set includes:

- Strangeland deluxe edition CD album.
- DVD featuring five live performances, album trailers and behind the scenes footage.
- The 20+ page book features exclusive photos from the making of the album, taken by Alex Lake.

"Myth" was released as the B-side to "Silenced by the Night", as well as on the Japanese and US iTunes editions of the album.

== Personnel ==
Recording

- Recorded at Sea Fog Studios in East Sussex, England, and at RAK Studios and Air Lyndhurst Hall in London, England
- Mixed at Miloco The Engine Room, London, England
- Mastered at Gateway Mastering, Portland, Maine, United States

Personnel

- Keane – songwriting, instrumentation
- Dan Grech-Marguerat – producer, engineer, mixer
- Liam Burn – engineer
- Tom Hough – engineer
- Will Fenlon – engineer
- Alfie Grant – assistant engineer
- Duncan Fuller – assistant mixer
- Dave Fridmann – additional programming ("Sovereign Light Café" and "On the Road")

== Charts ==
=== Weekly charts ===
Chart (2012)	Peak position
Australian Albums (ARIA)	49
Austrian Albums (Ö3 Austria)	20
Belgian Albums (Ultratop Flanders)	9
Belgian Albums (Ultratop Wallonia)	4
Canadian Albums (Billboard)	14
Danish Albums (Hitlisten)	9
Dutch Albums (Album Top 100)	1
Finnish Albums (Suomen virallinen lista)	40
French Albums (SNEP)	11
German Albums (Offizielle Top 100)	5
Irish Albums (IRMA)	1
Italian Albums (FIMI)	23
Mexican Albums (AMPROFON)	16
New Zealand Albums (RMNZ)	38
Norwegian Albums (VG-lista)	4
Portuguese Albums (AFP)	5
Scottish Albums (Official Charts)	1
Spanish Albums (Promusicae)	5
Swedish Albums (Sverigetopplistan)	38
Swiss Albums (Schweizer Hitparade)	3
UK Albums (Official Charts)	1
US Billboard 200	17
US Top Rock Albums (Billboard)	6

=== Year-end charts ===
Chart (2012)	Position
Belgian Albums (Ultratop Flanders)	81
Belgian Albums (Ultratop Wallonia)	29
Dutch Albums (Album Top 100)	40
French Albums (SNEP)	189
South Korean International Albums (Gaon)	81
UK Albums (OCC)	52

== Certifications ==
Region	Certification	Certified units/sales
United Kingdom (BPI)	Gold	213,165

== Release history ==
Region	Date	Format(s)	Label
Germany	4 May 2012	CD, digital download	Island Records
United Kingdom	7 May 2012	CD, digital download	Island Records
United States	8 May 2012	CD, digital download	Cherrytree Records, Interscope Records
Japan	9 May 2012	CD, digital download	Island Records
Australia	11 May 2012	CD, digital download	Island Records
