= Jesse Quin =

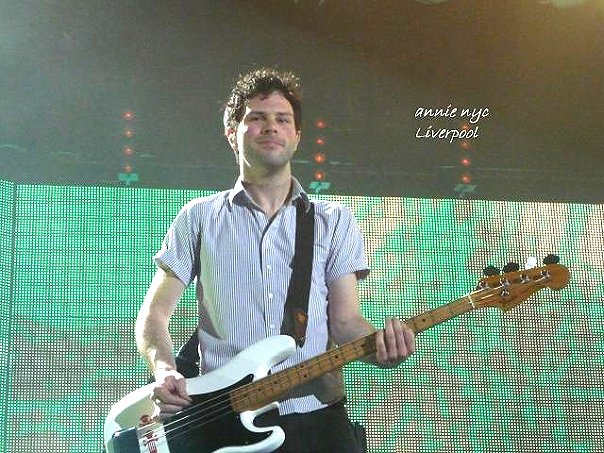

Background information
- Born: Jesse Joseph Quin; 3 September 1981 (age 45); Bedford, Bedfordshire, England
- Genre: Alternative rock
- Occupations: Musician, songwriter, record producer
- Instruments: Bass; guitar; keyboards; vocals; drums
- Years active: 2007–present
- Member of: Keane, Mt. Desolation, Jesse Quin & The Mets

Jesse Joseph Quin (born 3 September 1981) is an English multi-instrumentalist, singer, songwriter and producer, best known as the bass player of the alternative rock band Keane. Quin also founded and runs an arts centre on an abandoned U.S. Air Force base in the English countryside called Old Jet.

== Biography ==
Jesse Joseph Quin was born on 3 September 1981 in Bedford, England. His mother, Charity Quin, is a folk singer; his father, Rob Quin, was a sound engineer. Jesse has a sister named Amber. Quin began his musical life at an early age. The first instrument he learned to play was the drums. He officially began his musical career in 2007 by forming Jesse Quin & The Mets, with himself on vocals, guitar, and keyboards; plus bassist Jarrett, keyboardist James Barne, guitarist John-William Scott, and drummer King Louis. They released an EP titled Always Catching Up. He also became a member of Laura Marling's band.

Later in 2007 he joined Keane on tour as a roadie. Quin performed with Keane at a concert for Warchild in 2007. He played bass on Keane's cover of "Under Pressure". Quin was invited by Keane to help record their album Perfect Symmetry and then toured with them on the Perfect Symmetry World Tour. He recorded with Keane on Night Train and eventually became an official member of the band (which was announced on their official website on 3 February 2011).

== Personal life ==
Quin married longtime girlfriend Julia Dannenberg in 2009.

== Discography ==
Solo Albums

• While The World Sleeps (2024)

With Keane

Studio albums
- Perfect Symmetry (2008)
- Strangeland (2012)
- Cause and Effect (2019)

EPs
- Retrospective EP1 (2008)
- Night Train (2010)
- Retrospective EP2 (2010)
Compilations album
- The Best of Keane (2013)

=== With Mt. Desolation ===
Studio albums
- Mt. Desolation (2010)
- When the Night Calls (2018)
- Through Crooked Aim (2023)
