= Tim Rice-Oxley =

English musician

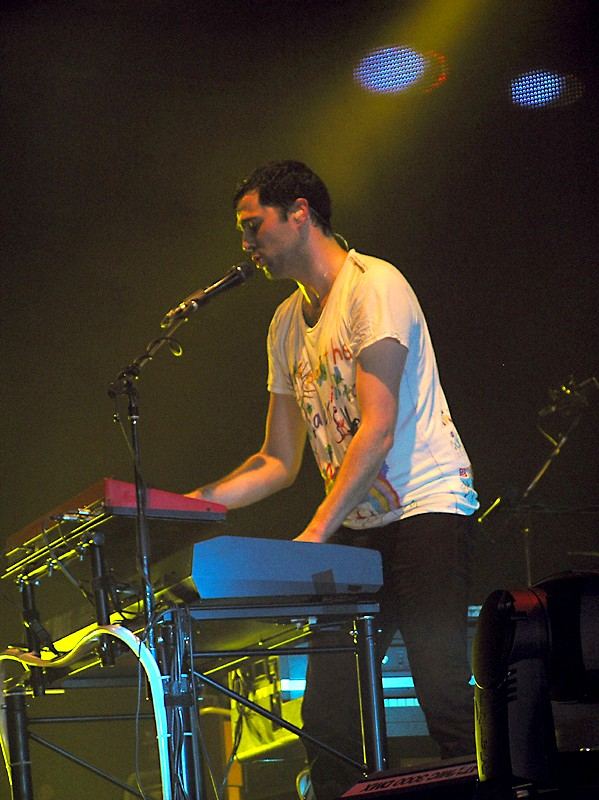

Background information
- Also known as: Tim Rice-Oxley
- Born: Timothy James Rice-Oxley; 2 June 1976 (age 50); Oxford, England
- Genres: Alternative rock; pop rock; folk rock
- Occupations: Musician; producer; songwriter
- Instruments: Piano; keyboards; vocals; bass; guitar
- Years active: 1995–present
- Member of: Keane; Mt. Desolation

Timothy James Rice-Oxley (born 2 June 1976) is an English musician best known for being the keyboardist, backing vocalist and songwriter of the alternative rock band Keane. In 2010, he formed a side-project, Mt. Desolation, with his Keane bandmate Jesse Quin.

== Life and career ==
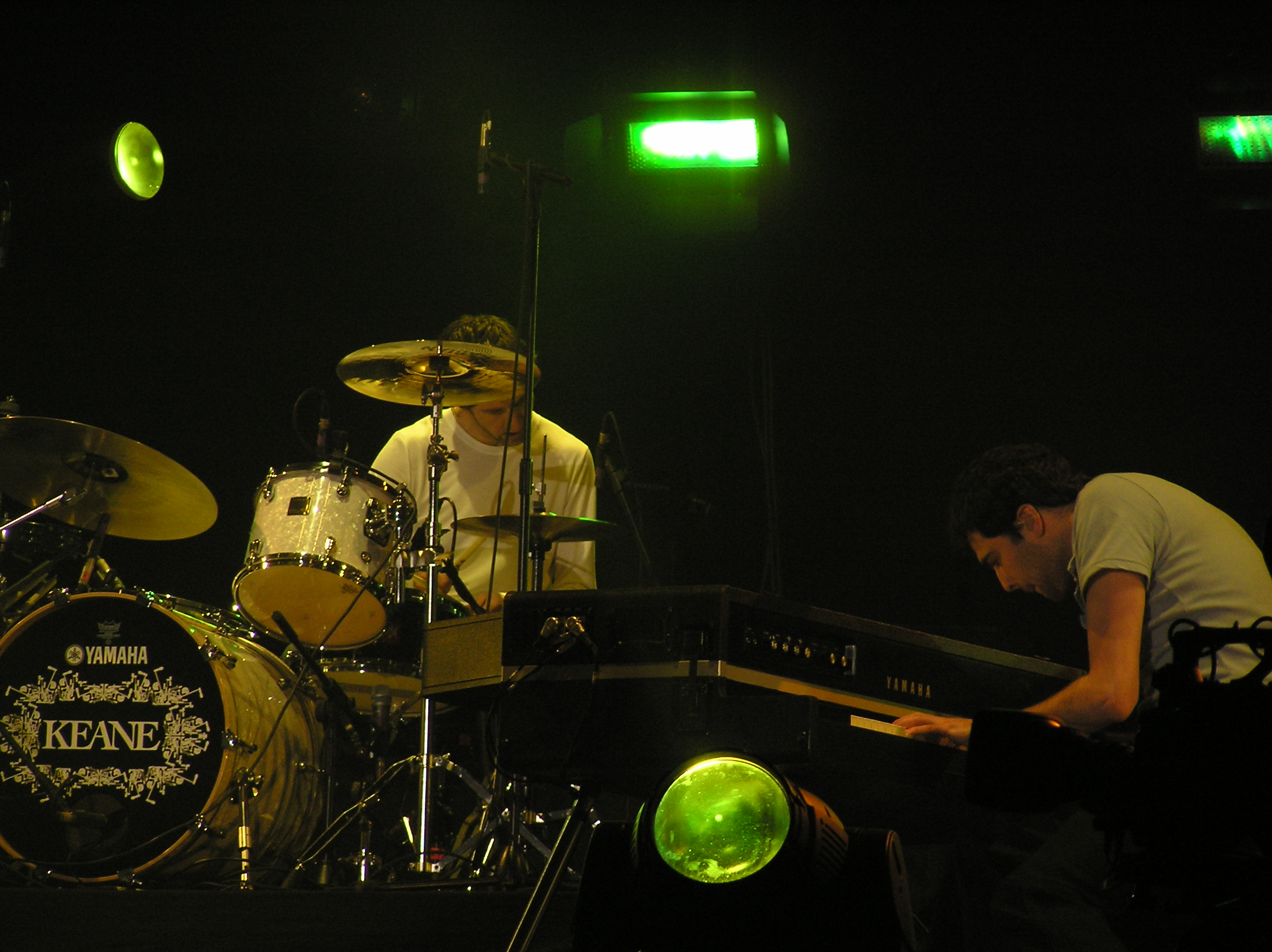
Rice-Oxley playing his Yamaha CP-70 alongside drummer Richard Hughes during the January 2005 Tsunami Relief Cardiff concert

Timothy James Rice-Oxley was born in Oxford to Charles Patrick and Margaret Rice-Oxley. He has a younger brother, Tom, born in 1979, a month after Tim’s bandmate Tom Chaplin. He had piano lessons when he was a teenager but admitted to hating them and never practicing pieces because they were all classical music, which he found boring. After his parents stopped his lessons, Rice-Oxley developed a liking for piano and so taught himself how to play, mainly because of the Beatles.

== Keane ==
Rice-Oxley provides live and studio backing vocals for Keane, except for the studio songs "Sunshine", "This Is the Last Time" (demo version) and "Your Love" where he sings the lead vocals, as well as some Under the Iron Sea DVD and Perfect Symmetry demos.

== Compositions ==
In 2006, Rice-Oxley co-wrote the songs "Early Winter", and "The Girl Inside" (unreleased) on Gwen Stefani's second solo album, The Sweet Escape. "Early Winter" has been performed by Keane live. The song "Perfect Symmetry" from the album of the same name is considered by Chaplin to be one of the best Rice-Oxley has written. In 2009, he co-wrote the song "Everything Is Beautiful" for Kylie Minogue's eleventh studio album, Aphrodite.

Rice-Oxley composed all the songs for the side-project Mt. Desolation with Jesse Quin in 2010. He sang the song live. In 2013, he co-wrote the song "Jump" with Gary Barlow for the latter's solo album, Since I Saw You Last.

In 2016, he co-wrote the song "Magnificent Time" by Travis.

In 2018, he co-wrote the song "Lost My Mind" by Lily Allen.

== Mt. Desolation ==
Mt. Desolation is an alt-country side-project that Rice-Oxley formed with bassist Jesse Quin. The band also consists of members of Mumford & Sons, The Killers and The Staves. Mt. Desolation released their self-titled debut album on 18 October 2010. The band toured the UK and Ireland in September 2010 and the US and Canada in October 2010.

The band's second album, When the Night Calls, was released on 25 May 2018. It was followed by a short tour of the UK in June 2018.

== Personal life ==
Rice-Oxley lives in Polegate, East Sussex. He has two daughters, Lilac and Anna.

Reportedly, the effects of touring took their toll on Rice-Oxley's marriage to Jayne, and they split up in 2012 after seven years of marriage.

== Awards ==
Rice-Oxley won an Ivor Novello Award for Songwriter of the Year in May 2005.

== Discography ==
=== With Keane ===
Studio albums
- Hopes and Fears (2004)
- Under the Iron Sea (2006)
- Perfect Symmetry (2008)
- Strangeland (2012)
- Cause and Effect (2019)

EPs
- Retrospective EP1 (2008)
- Night Train (2010)
- Retrospective EP2 (2010)
- Retroactive – EP1 (2019)
Compilations album
- The Best of Keane (2013)

=== With Mt. Desolation ===
Studio albums
- Mt. Desolation (2010)
- When the Night Calls (2018)
- Through Crooked Aim (2023)
