= Tom Chaplin =

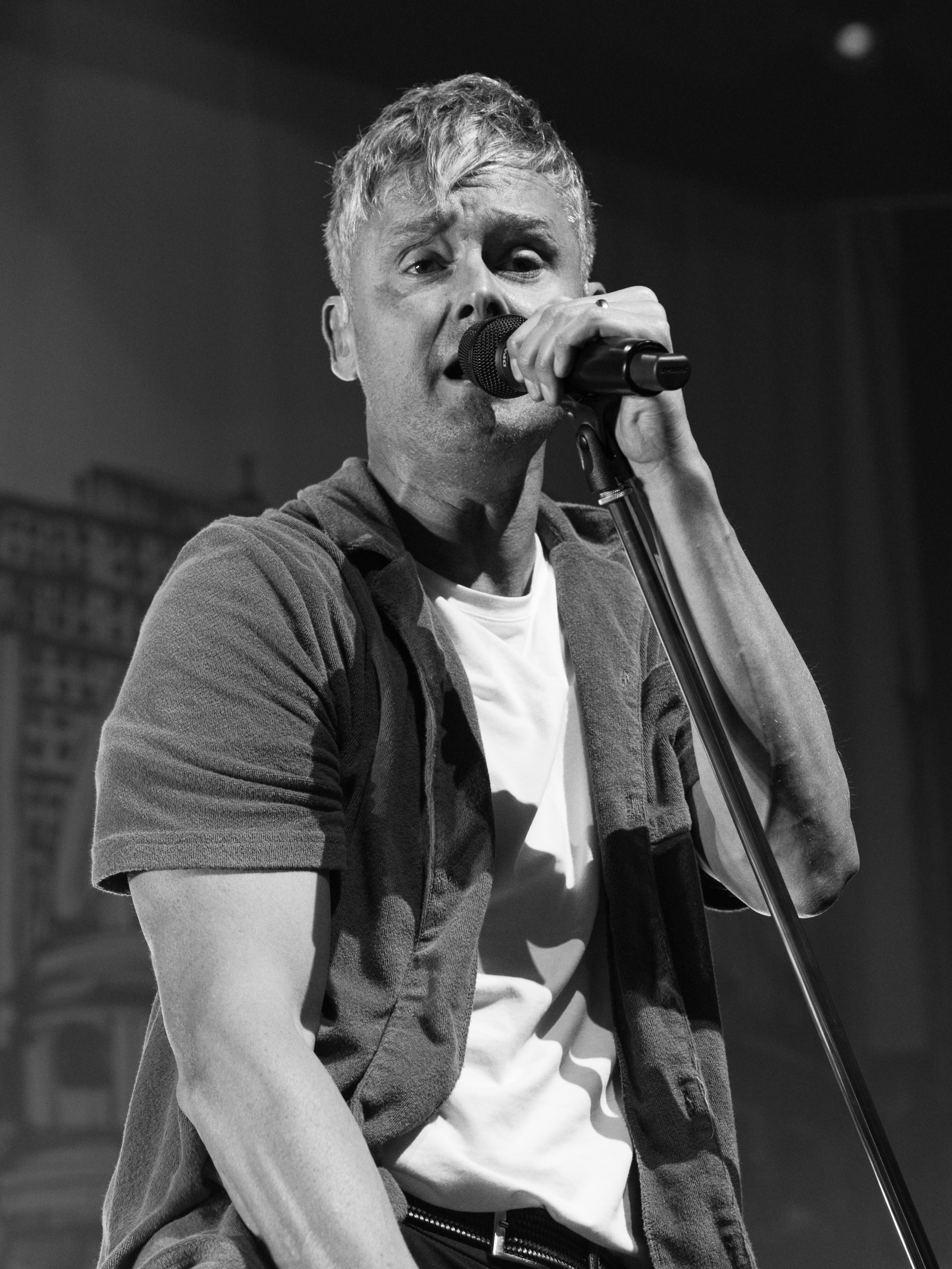
- Chaplin with Keane in 2024

Background information
- Born: Thomas Oliver Chaplin; 8 March 1979 (age 47); Hastings, East Sussex, England
- Genres: Alternative rock, post-britpop, pop rock
- Occupations: Musician; singer; songwriter
- Instruments: Vocals; guitar; keyboards
- Years active: 1997–present
- Member of: Keane

Thomas Oliver Chaplin (born 8 March 1979) is an English musician who is the co-founder and lead singer of the alternative rock band Keane.

== Early life ==
Thomas Oliver Chaplin was born in Hastings, East Sussex, to Sally and David Chaplin OBE, in the same hospital as future bandmate Tim Rice-Oxley's brother, also called Tom. Their mothers met when they gave birth in the same hospital, allowing Chaplin and Rice-Oxley to form a friendship that endures today.

Chaplin's father was headmaster of Vinehall School in Robertsbridge, so both friends were schooled there along with Richard Hughes, who would later be their bandmate. With Rice-Oxley and Hughes, Chaplin then attended Tonbridge School. Studying there, they met Dominic Scott (who was a founding member of Keane but left in 2001). During his time at Vinehall, Chaplin acted in several school plays and was part of the school's choral group. He also played the flute while at school. Chaplin attended the University of Edinburgh, where he studied art history for a year before dropping out to pursue a career in music.

Meanwhile, in 1995, the trio of Scott, Rice-Oxley and Hughes started their first band, The Lotus Eaters (not to be confused with the 1980s chart band of the same name). It was a cover band that played U2, Oasis and The Beatles at Sussex pubs. Tim Rice-Oxley invited Chaplin to join the band as an acoustic guitar player. A short time later, in 1997, the band's name changed to Keane and Chaplin became the lead singer.

== Keane ==
Chaplin was invited to join the band by Rice-Oxley, after he finally convinced the other two, in 1997, when the name The Lotus Eaters was changed to Cherry Keane, after a friend of Chaplin's mother. 'Cherry' was later removed from the name.

During their stint in London, Chaplin shared a flat with Rice-Oxley in Stoke Newington and they tried to get money for rehearsal time. Chaplin worked at a publishing company where his chief responsibility was to carry boxes.

With Scott in the line-up as the lead guitarist, Chaplin had to play the acoustic guitar. Since Scott left in 2001, he primarily takes lead vocals, but also plays the organ on "Hamburg Song" during some live gigs, as well as a distorted piano on some tracks from their second album. He also took part in Band Aid 20's re-recording of "Do They Know It's Christmas?" in November 2004 doing a solo on the line "feed the world", something that had not been done on previous versions where all artists sang.

== Solo career ==
Having said that he intended to make a solo record during Keane's hiatus, Chaplin stated in January 2016 that he was recording his debut solo album in Los Angeles, California, with 40 songs written and whittled down to an album's worth. He announced in late June that the album was complete and that it would be out soon.

=== 2016–2017: The Wave ===
The album name The Wave was announced via Twitter and Facebook on 10 August 2016. The same day, Hardened Heart was released with a music video. On 26 August 2016, "Quicksand" was released as the first single from the album. On 6 September 2016, Chaplin announced he would be playing eight intimate solo shows across the UK in October 2016. These were his first solo gigs for four years. The Wave was released on 14 October 2016 by Island Records. Four singles were released from the album: "Quicksand", "Still Waiting", "Solid Gold" (of which the single release is a collaboration with JONES, rather than the solo version which appears on the album), and "See It So Clear". The release of The Wave was followed by the announcement of the Carried by the Wave Tour, a longer set of dates running between January and September 2017. The tour consisted of four legs: first in the United States and Canada, then across Europe, a third leg in the UK during May 2017 and a last leg in Latin America.

=== 2017–present: Twelve Tales of Christmas and The Masked Singer ===
On 13 October 2017, Chaplin announced that he had recorded his first solo Christmas album, entitled Twelve Tales of Christmas, to be released on 17 November 2017. Simultaneously the first single from the album was released, entitled "Under a Million Lights". The album consists of eight original tracks and four cover versions: "Walking in the Air" (written by Howard Blake), "2000 Miles" (originally by The Pretenders), "River" (originally by Joni Mitchell) and "Stay Another Day" (originally by East 17). It was also announced that Chaplin would be performing three gigs to accompany the release of the album; at the Palace Theatre in Manchester on 10 December 2017, at The Forum in Bath on 11 December and at the Royal Festival Hall in London on 12 December.

In January 2022, Chaplin appeared on the third series of The Masked Singer as "Poodle". He was fifth to be unmasked. Following that event, he said in an interview that he was working on his third solo album, that would be coming out later in 2022.

In July 2022, he announced that his third album, Midpoint, would be released on 2 September 2022.

== Equipment ==
Chaplin uses a Hammond XK2 organ for "Hamburg Song" and "Nothing in My Way". Since May 2006, he has used a Yamaha CP60M for live piano parts in "A Bad Dream", "The Frog Prince" and "Try Again".

He has played acoustic guitar in such songs as "Your Eyes Open" since the 2006 UK tour, and during 2007 played acoustic solos of "Broken Toy" and "The Frog Prince". He played guitar on Keane's third album, Perfect Symmetry and has been the lead guitarist in live shows for the album. Tom plays three different Fender Telecaster guitars: one red, one white and one light blue.

In an interview with Keane Backline, Rice-Oxley stated that Chaplin had been interested in learning to play the theremin, but "couldn't be bothered to learn how to use it", also stating that the theremin "might be the only way of reproducing the musical saw sound" used in some tracks of Perfect Symmetry.

== Personal life ==
Chaplin married his girlfriend Natalie Dive in June 2011. He has a daughter born on 20 March 2014 and a son born in 2020. The family lives in Wittersham, Kent.

Chaplin is a keen golfer, supporter of Ipswich Town and of the England cricket team. He identifies as an agnostic.

=== Drug rehabilitation ===
On 22 August 2006, Chaplin stated that he was receiving treatment for drug addiction problems. He and his bandmates canceled their North American tour for his rehabilitation after he left their hotel in Japan with no warning, choosing to fly back to Britain alone. He left the Priory clinic in London on 6 October, but continued to receive treatment after leaving.

In August 2016, Chaplin said in an interview with music critic Neil McCormick that he began using drugs again before the release of his solo album, and mentioned that anxiety over the album caused him to get "back to shoveling coke up (his) nose". Chaplin said he nearly died one night in 2015. He said people began to give up on him, and his wife once told him she loved him in case she never saw him again. Chaplin recovered by seeing a psychoanalyst. He also stated that the previous 12 months had been the happiest of his life with his wife and daughter.

== Discography ==
=== Solo ===
- The Wave (2016)
- Twelve Tales of Christmas (2017)
- Midpoint (2022)

=== With Keane ===
- Hopes and Fears (2004)
- Under the Iron Sea (2006)
- Perfect Symmetry (2008)
- Night Train (2010)
- Strangeland (2012)
- Cause and Effect (2019)

== Tours ==
- Carried By The Wave Tour (2017)
- Twelve Tales of Christmas Tour (2017)
- Midpoint Tour (2022)
- Keane 20 (2024)
