= CSS discography =

Brazilian electronic rock group discography

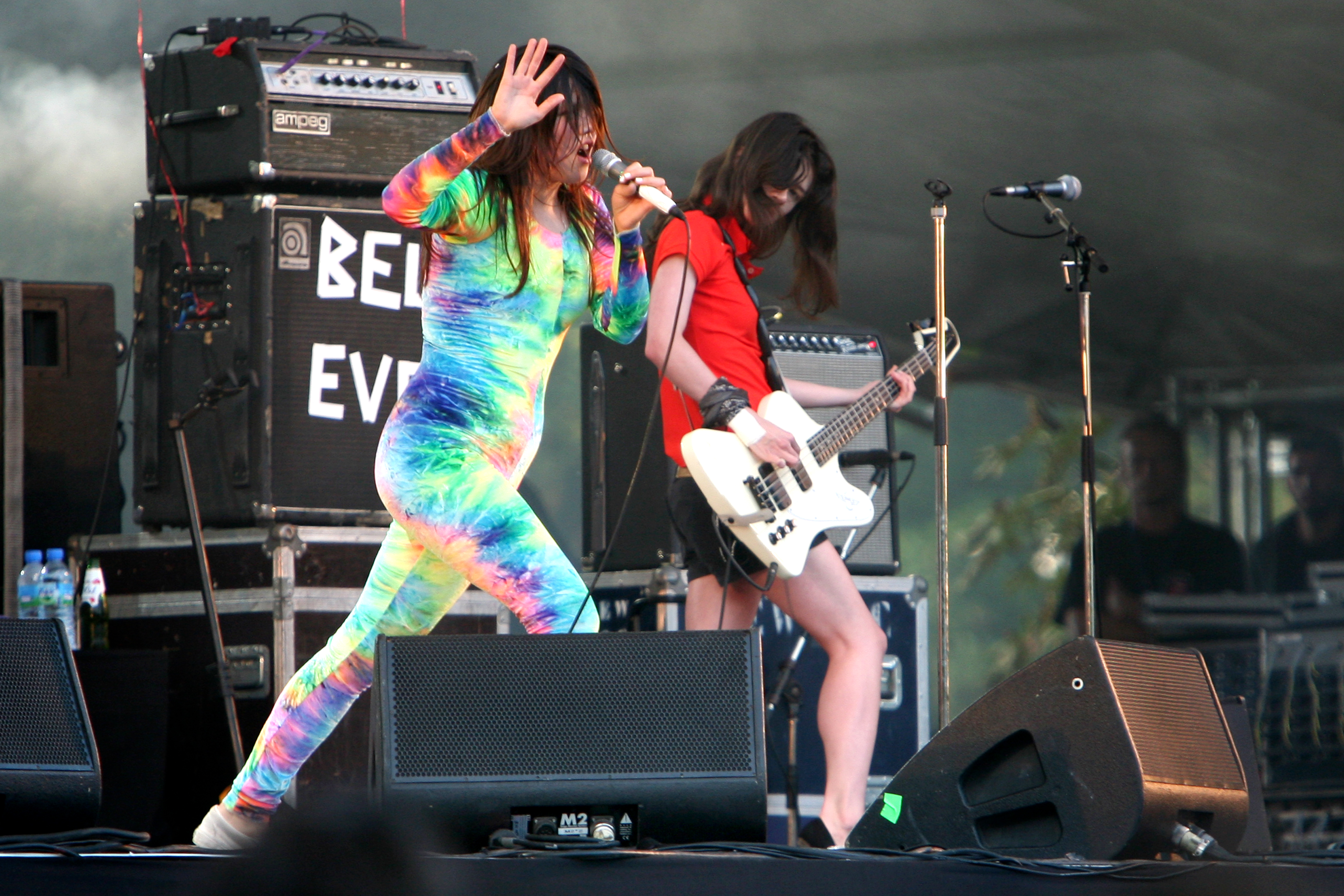
- CSS performing at Rock en Seine.
- Studio albums: 4
- Extended plays: 4
- Video albums: 12
- Music videos: 9

The discography of CSS, a Brazilian electronic rock group formed in São Paulo in 2003, consists of four studio albums, 15 singles and four extended plays.

== Studio albums ==
List of albums, with selected chart positions and certifications
| Title | Album details | Peak chart positions | | | | | | | |
| Title | Album details | FIN | FRA | IRL | JPN | UK | US | US Dance | US Indie |
|---|---|---|---|---|---|---|---|---|---|
| Cansei de Ser Sexy | Released: October 9, 2005 (Brazil) July 11, 2006 (international); Label: Trama/Sub Pop/Warner; Format: CD, LP, DI | — | — | 24 | — | 69 | — | 9 | — |
| Donkey | Released: July 21, 2008; Label: Trama/Sub Pop/Warner; Format: CD, LP, DI | 22 | 54 | 37 | 38 | 32 | 189 | — | 30 |
| La Liberación | Released: August 22, 2011; Label: Universal Music/V2 Records/KSR; Format: CD, DI | — | — | — | 50 | 180 | — | — | — |
| Planta | Released: July 11, 2013; Label: SQE Music/KSR; Format: CD, LP | — | — | — | 142 | — | — | — | — |
"—" denotes a release that did not chart.

== EPs ==
| Title | Details |
|---|---|
| Em Rotterdam Já É uma Febre | Released: July 2, 2004; Label: Trama; Format: CD |
| A Onda Mortal / Uma Tarde com PJ | Released: January 2, 2005; Label: Independent; Format: CD |
| CSS Suxxx | Released: October 29, 2005; Label: Trama; Format: CD |
| iTunes Live: London Festival '08 - CSS | Released: July 29, 2008; Label: Sub Pop; Format: DI |

== Singles ==
List of singles, with selected chart positions and certifications, showing year released and album name
| Single | Year | Peak chart positions | | | | | | | Album |
| Single | Year | CAN | FIN | IRL | UK | US | US Dance | US Pop | Album |
|---|---|---|---|---|---|---|---|---|---|
| "Let's Make Love and Listen to Death from Above" | 2004 | — | — | — | — | — | — | — | Cansei de Ser Sexy (Brazilian edition) |
| "Bezzi" | 2005 | — | — | — | — | — | — | — | Cansei de Ser Sexy (Brazilian edition) |
| "Superafim" | 2005 | — | — | — | — | — | — | — | Cansei de Ser Sexy (Brazilian edition) |
| "Alala" | 2006 | — | — | — | — | — | 21 | — | Cansei de Ser Sexy (International edition) |
| "Off the Hook" | 2006 | — | — | — | 43 | — | — | — | Cansei de Ser Sexy (International edition) |
| "Let's Make Love and Listen to Death from Above" (reissue) | 2007 | — | — | 37 | 39 | — | 10 | — | Cansei de Ser Sexy (International edition) |
| "Alcohol" | 2007 | — | — | — | — | — | — | — | Cansei de Ser Sexy (International edition) |
| "Music Is My Hot Hot Sex" | 2007 | 12 | — | — | — | 63 | — | 43 | Cansei de Ser Sexy (International edition) |
| "Rat Is Dead (Rage)" | 2008 | — | — | — | — | — | — | — | Donkey |
| "Left Behind" | 2008 | — | 18 | — | 78 | — | — | — | Donkey |
| "Move" | 2008 | — | — | — | — | — | — | — | Donkey |
| "Hits Me Like a Rock" | 2011 | — | — | — | — | — | — | — | La Liberación |
| "City Grrrl" | 2011 | — | — | — | — | — | — | — | La Liberación |
| "I've Seen You Drunk Gurl" | 2012 | — | — | — | — | — | — | — | Non-album single |
| "Hangover" | 2013 | — | — | — | — | — | — | — | Planta |
| "Into the Sun" | 2013 | — | — | — | — | — | — | — | Planta |

== Remixes ==
- Tiny Masters of Today – "Hey Mr. DJ" (2007)
- Bitchee Bitchee Ya Ya Ya – "Fuck Friend" (2007)
- Lily Allen – "Alfie" (2007)
- Tilly and the Wall – "The Freest Man" (2007)
- The Wombats – "Kill the Director" (2007)
- The Mules – "We're Good People" (2007)
- The Little Ones – "Lovers Who Uncover" (2007)
- Bonde Do Role – "Office Boy" (2007)
- The Cribs – "Men's Needs" (2007)
- Loney, Dear – "The City, the Airport" (2007)
- Asobi Seksu – "Strawberries" (2007)
- Kylie Minogue – "Wow" (2008)
- Tetine – "I Go to the Doctor!" (2008)
- The B-52's – "Funplex" (2008)
- Digitalism – "Pogo" (2008)
- Bloc Party – "Mercury" (2008)
- Lykke Li – "Little Bit" (2008)
- Keane – "The Lovers Are Losing" (2008)
- Sia – "Buttons" (2008)
- Kings of Leon – "The Bucket" (2009)
- Chromeo – "Fancy Footwork" (2009)
- Fever Ray – "Seven" (2009)
- Faker – "Dangerous" (2011)
- GIVERS – "Up Up Up" (2011)
- The Asteroids Galaxy Tour – "Heart Attack" (2012)
- Gossip – "Move in the Right Direction" (2012)
- Emmy the Great – "God of Loneliness" (2012)
- Blondfire – "Walking With Giants" (2013)
- NONONO – "Pumpin Blood" (2013)
- Escort – "Barbarians" (2013)
- Oh Land – "Head Up High" (2015)

== Covers ==
- Grizzly Bear – "Knife" (2007)
- The Breeders – "Cannonball" (2008)
- Duran Duran – "Rio" (2016)
- Neneh Cherry – "Buffalo Stance (2021)
