= Planta (album) =

Studio album by CSS
- Released: 11 June 2013
- Genre: Electronic
- Length: 40:22
- Label: Self-released
- Producer: Dave Sitek

CSS chronology
La Liberación (2011)	Planta (2013)

Professional ratings
Aggregate scores
Source	Rating
Metacritic	54/100
Review scores
Source	Rating
AllMusic	3.5/5 stars
Consequence of Sound	D
DIY	3.5/5 stars
The Line of Best Fit	7.5/10
MusicOMH	2/5 stars
Now	2/5 Ns
NME	2.5/5 stars
Pitchfork	5/10
Rolling Stone	2/5 stars
Slant Magazine	3/5 stars

Planta is the fourth studio album by Brazilian indie rock band CSS. It was released on 11 June 2013. The album was produced by David Sitek. It is the band's first album recorded without guitarist Adriano Cintra, who left the band in November 2011.

== Critical reception ==
Planta was met with "mixed or average" reviews from critics. At Metacritic, which assigns a weighted average rating out of 100 to reviews from mainstream publications, this release received an average score of 54 based on 18 reviews.

In a review for AllMusic, critic reviewer Matt Collar wrote: "Planta is a frothy, lightly experimental electro-pop outing that retains all of the band's fun, dance party energy. Planta features all of the old-school-sounding synths and drum machines CSS have built their sound around since their infectious 2006 debut, Cansei de Ser Sexy." Greg Inglis of DIY said: "Planta is the sound of a band rejuvenated, a diverse yet cohesive effort that tightens the sonic screws without losing any of the warmth and identity they've managed to create for themselves."

== Track listing ==
Planta track listing
No.	Title	Length
1.	"Honey"	4:02
2.	"Hangover"	2:42
3.	"Into the Sun"	4:57
4.	"Girlfriend"	3:14
5.	"Dynamite"	2:44
6.	"Sweet"	3:52
7.	"Too Hot"	3:58
8.	"Teenage Tiger Cat"	2:52
9.	"Frankie Goes to North Hollywood"	4:26
10.	"The Hangout"	3:02
11.	"Faith in Love"	4:38

Japanese bonus track
No.	Title	Length
12.	"Kawaii"	1:12

== Personnel ==
Band members

- Lovefoxxx – vocals
- Ana Rezende – guitar, keyboard
- Luiza Sá – drums
- Carolina Parra – guitar, drums

Additional musicians

- Jaleel Bunton – drums
- Todd Simon – horn

Production

- Dave Sitek – producer
- Steve Fallone – mastering

== Charts ==
Chart performance for Planta
Chart (2013)	Peak position
Japanese Albums (Oricon)	142
