= List of awards and nominations received by Keane =

Keane awards and nominations
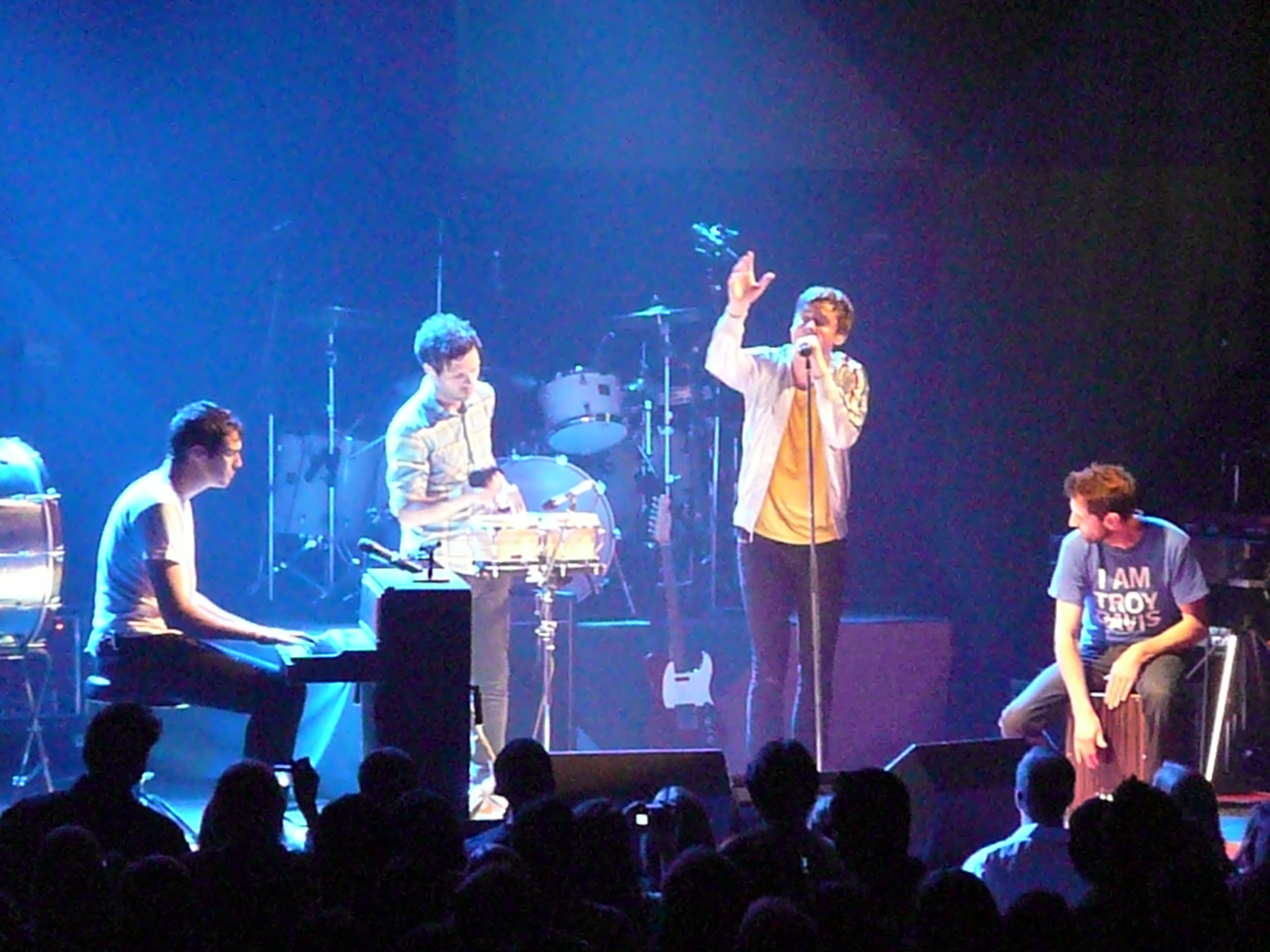
- Keane performing live in Washington, D.C. in 2009; From left to right: Tim Rice-Oxley, Jesse Quin, Tom Chaplin, Richard Hughes
Awards and nominations
Award	Wins	Nominations
Brit	2	5
Echo	0	1
Grammy	0	2
Ivor Novello	1	1
MTV Europe	0	3
Q	2	3
World Music	0	2
GQ Awards	1	1
Mercury Prize	0	1
MTVU Woody Awards	0	1
Premios Onda	1	1
Q Magazine	1	2
Q Best of 2008	2	2
ASCAP/PRS Awards	1	1

Totals (Note: Certain award groups do not simply award one winner. They acknowledge several different recipients, have runners-up, and have third place. Since this is a specific recognition and is different from losing an award, runner-up mentions are considered wins in this award tally. For simplification and to avoid errors, each award in this list has been presumed to have had a prior nomination.)
- Wins: 11
- Nominations: 26

British rock band Keane, composed of Tim Rice-Oxley, Richard Hughes, Jesse Quin, and Tom Chaplin, has received numerous awards and nominations for their musical work. They have released five studio albums—Hopes and Fears (2004), Under the Iron Sea (2006), Perfect Symmetry (2008), Strangeland (2012) and Cause and Effect (2019).

== ASCAP/PRS Awards ==
Keane has received one award from one nomination.

Year	Nominee/Work	Award	Result
2005	Hopes and Fears	College Award	Won

== Brit Awards ==
The Brit Awards are the British Phonographic Industry's annual pop music awards. Keane has received two awards from five nominations.

Year	Nominee/Work	Award	Result	Ref.
2005	Hopes and Fears	MasterCard Best British Album	Won	
2005	Hopes and Fears	Best British Breakthrough Artist	Won	
2005	Keane	Best British Group	Nominated	
2005	"Everybody's Changing"	Best British Single	Nominated	
2010	Hopes and Fears	Best BRITs Album of 30 Years	Nominated	

== Echo Awards ==
The Echo Awards is a German music award event which is held annually, where the year's winners are decided by the band's sales from the previous year. Keane has received one award from one nomination.

Year	Nominee/Work	Award	Result
2005	Hopes and Fears	Best International Disclosure	Nominated

== GQ Awards ==
GQ is a monthly men's magazine, where the annual winners are voted through the GQ website. Keane has received one award from one nomination.

Year	Nominee/Work	Award	Result
2006	Under the Iron Sea	Band of the Year	Won

== Grammy Awards ==
The Grammy Awards is an annual music awards show held by the National Academy of Recording Arts and Sciences of the United States for outstanding achievements in the record industry. Keane has received no awards from two nominations.

Year	Nominee/Work	Award	Result	Ref(s).
2006	Keane	Best New Artist	Nominated	
2007	"Is It Any Wonder?"	Best Pop Performance by a Duo or a Group With Vocals	Nominated	

== Ivor Novello Awards ==
The Ivor Novello Awards is an award ceremony for songwriting and composing, held annually in London, United Kingdom. Keane has received one award from one nominations.

Year	Nominee/Work	Award	Result
2004	Tim Rice-Oxley	Composers of the Year	Won

== Mercury Music Prize Awards ==
The Mercury Prize Awards is an annually held awards ceremony for the year's best albums. Keane has received no awards from one nomination.

Year	Nominee/Work	Award	Result
2004	Hopes and Fears	Best Album	Nominated

== MTV Awards ==
=== MTV Europe Music Awards ===
The MTV Europe Music Awards is an annual awards ceremony established in 1994 by MTV Europe for the best in European music. Keane has received no awards from three nominations.

Year	Nominee/Work	Award	Result
2004	Hopes and Fears	Best New Act	Nominated
2006	Keane	Best Group	Nominated
2006	Under the Iron Sea	Best Rock	Nominated

=== MTVU Woody Awards ===
Keane has received no award from one nomination.

Year	Nominee/Work	Award	Result
2005	Hopes and Fears	Favorite International Artist Award	Nominated

== Premios Onda ==
Keane has received one award from one nomination.

Year	Nominee/Work	Award	Result
2004	Keane	Best International Band	Won

== Q magazine ==
The UK music magazine Q designated annual awards for excellence in music.

Year	Nominee/Work	Award	Result
2004	Hopes and Fears	Best Album	Won
2004	Hopes and Fears	Best Newcomer	Nominated

Q Awards

Year	Nominee/Work	Award	Result
2006	Under the Iron Sea	Best Album	Nominated
2008	"Spiralling"	Song of the Year	Won
2012	"Disconnected"	Music Video of the Year	Won

The Q Best of 2008

Year	Nominee/Work	Award	Result
2008	Perfect Symmetry	Album of the Year	Won
2008	"Perfect Symmetry"	Song of the Year	Won

== World Music Awards ==
The World Music Awards is an international awards ceremony that annually honors recording artists based on worldwide sales figures provided by the International Federation of the Phonographic Industry. Keane has received no awards from two nominations.

Year	Nominee/Work	Award	Result
2005	Hopes and Fears	Best Rock Group World	Nominated
2005	Hopes and Fears	Group with Higher Global Sales	Nominated
