= Move (CSS song) =

Single by CSS

from the album Donkey
- Released: October 13, 2008; November 4, 2008
- Genre: New wave, electroclash
- Length: 3:53
- Label: Sub Pop, Warner Bros.
- Songwriter(s): Adriano Cintra, Luiza Sá, Lovefoxxx
- Producer(s): Adriano Cintra

CSS singles chronology
"Left Behind" (2008)	"Move" (2008)	"Hits Me Like a Rock" (2011)

Music video
- "Move" on YouTube

"Move" is a single by CSS, it is the third released from the album Donkey. It was released on October 13, 2008. It was remixed by Cut Copy and Frankmusik. The single failed to chart everywhere, except for Italy. It is featured in the forever 21 playlist. A remix of the song was used for a jazz routine on So You Think You Can Dance season 5, which was performed by Janette Manrana and Evan Kasprzak, and later season 8 for a solo by jazz dancer Missy Morelli.

== Music video ==
There's a music video for the song directed by Keith Schofield, shot in Barcelona. It can be seen on YouTube and on CSS's official MySpace.

== Track listings ==
CD

1. "Move" (album version)
2. "Move" (Frankmusik's club bingo dub)

7" vinyl
A. "Move" (album version)
B. "Move" (Cut Copy remix)

Digital

1. "Move"
2. "Move" (Metronomy remix)

12" maxi vinyl
A1. "Move" (Cut Copy remix)
A2. "Move" (album version)
B1. "Move" (Metronomy remix)
B2. "Move" (Frankmusik club bingo dub)
B3. "Move" (instrumental version)

Promo

1. "Move" (album version)
2. "Move" (instrumental)
