= Donkey (album) =

Studio album by CSS
- Released: 21 July 2008
- Studios: Trama Studios (São Paulo, Brazil)
- Genres: Indie rock; synth-pop
- Length: 39:14
- Labels: Sub Pop; Warner Bros.
- Producer: Adriano Cintra

CSS chronology
Cansei de Ser Sexy (2006)	Donkey (2008)	La Liberación (2011)

Singles from Donkey
- 1. "Rat Is Dead (Rage)" Released: 28 April 2008; 2. "Left Behind" Released: 14 July 2008; 3. "Move" Released: 13 October 2008

Professional ratings
Aggregate scores
Source	Rating
Metacritic	63/100
Review scores
Source	Rating
AllMusic	3/5 stars
The Guardian	3/5 stars
NME	7/10
Now	4/5 stars
Pitchfork	5.6/10
Q	2/5 stars
Rolling Stone	3/5 stars
The Times	4/5 stars
Toronto Star	2.5/4 stars
Uncut	1/5 stars

Donkey is the second studio album by Brazilian electronic and rock band CSS. It was released on 21 July 2008 through Sub Pop and Warner Bros. Records. Seventeen songs were recorded at Trama Studios in São Paulo, of which eleven appear on the album. Donkey follows their critically acclaimed debut album Cansei de Ser Sexy.

Three months before the release, bassist Iracema Trevisan left the band, being replaced by then-drummer Adriano Cintra. The new drummer is Englishman Jon Harper, formerly of The Cooper Temple Clause.

The album was released in Canada and the United States by label Sub Pop, in Europe by Warner Bros. Records, and Japan by KSR. In initial reviews of the album, critics noted a more polished approach to CSS' sound and production techniques.

The album was mixed by Mark "Spike" Stent.

== Singles ==
The first single is "Rat Is Dead (Rage)", which was made available for free download on the band's official website on 28 April 2008. The second single, "Left Behind", was released physically on 14 July 2008 and charted at number 78 on the UK Singles Chart. The third single, "Move", was released on 13 October 2008. They shot a music video in Spain, directed by Keith Schofield, it can be seen on YouTube.

== Chart performance ==
Donkey debuted at number 37 on the Irish Albums Chart, at number 32 on the UK Albums Chart, at number 22 on the Finnish Albums Chart, at number 54 on the French Albums Chart and at number 189 on the Billboard 200.

The song "Jager Yoga" featured in the video game FIFA 09 and "Rat Is Dead (Rage)" appeared in Midnight Club: Los Angeles.

== Track listing ==
Official track listing:

1. "Jager Yoga" (Adriano Cintra/Ana Rezende dos Anjos/Carolina Parra/Luiza Sá/Lovefoxxx) – 3:48
2. "Rat Is Dead (Rage)" (Adriano Cintra) – 3:18
3. "Let's Reggae All Night" (Adriano Cintra/Lovefoxxx) – 3:54
4. "Give Up" (Adriano Cintra/Luiza Sá) – 3:20
5. "Left Behind" (Adriano Cintra) – 3:30
6. "Beautiful Song" (Adriano Cintra/Lovefoxxx) – 3:27
7. "How I Became Paranoid" (Adriano Cintra) – 3:25
8. "Move" (Adriano Cintra/Luiza Sá/Lovefoxxx) – 3:53
9. "I Fly" (Adriano Cintra) – 3:16
10. "Believe Achieve" (Adriano Cintra/Lovefoxxx) – 3:36
11. "Air Painter" (Adriano Cintra/Lovefoxxx) – 3:47

iTunes bonus track / pre-order only track (UK)

12. "Hit and Run" – 3:02

Bonus disc ^^

1. "Hit and Run"
2. "Blackwing" (Adriano Cintra) ^
3. "I Fly" (demo) ^

Other recorded tracks

- "You and Yourself"
- "Dallas 141" (Adriano Cintra)
- "Cannonball" (Kim Deal) ^
- "Buenos Aires"

^ B-sides to "Left Behind" single.
^^ A limited bonus disc included as a gift for pre-orderers.

== Personnel ==
- Adriano Cintra – bass, vocals, background vocals
- Lovefoxxx – vocals
- Ana Rezende - guitars and keyboards
- Carolina Parra – guitar, background vocals
- Luiza Sá – guitar, keyboards, cowbell
- Jon Harper – drums

== Charts ==
Chart performance for Donkey
Chart (2008)	Peak position
Finnish Albums (Suomen virallinen lista)	22
French Albums (SNEP)	54
Irish Albums (IRMA)	37
Scottish Albums (Official Charts)	40
UK Albums (Official Charts)	32
US Billboard 200	189
US Independent Albums (Billboard)	30
