= Cansei de Ser Sexy =

Studio album by CSS
- Released: 9 October 2005
- Recorded: March–June 2005
- Studios: Jägermeister Bitte a.k.a. Adriano's and Carolina's home (São Paulo, Brazil)
- Genre: Punk funk
- Length: 47:50 (original version); 34:38 (international version)
- Label: Trama
- Producer: Adriano Cintra

CSS chronology
A Onda Mortal / Uma Tarde com PJ (2004)	Cansei de Ser Sexy (2005)	Donkey (2008)

Alternative cover
- International cover

Singles from Cansei de Ser Sexy (international version)
- 1. "Alala" Released: 2 November 2006; 2. "Off the Hook" Released: 26 February 2007; 3. "Let's Make Love and Listen to Death from Above" Released: 14 May 2007; 4. "Alcohol" Released: 1 October 2007

Cansei de Ser Sexy is the debut studio album by Brazilian rock band CSS. It was initially released in Brazil on 9 October 2005 through Trama, where it reportedly sold 5,000 copies and failed to chart. An international version was later released in the United States on 11 July 2006 through Sub Pop, and in the United Kingdom on 22 January 2007 through Sire Records. A limited-edition version of the album included a CD-R. The purpose of this was that the buyer could burn a copy of the album onto the CD-R to give to someone else as a gift.

The song "Alala" and video for "Let's Make Love and Listen to Death from Above" were included preloaded on the Zune multimedia player, released in November 2006. The singles "Alala", "Off the Hook" and "Let's Make Love and Listen to Death from Above" all charted on the UK Singles Chart, with the latter of the three reaching the top 40.

== Reception ==
Professional ratings
Aggregate scores
Source	Rating
Metacritic	73/100
Review scores
Source	Rating
AllMusic	3.5/5 stars
Alternative Press	4/5
Blender	3/5 stars
The Guardian	4/5 stars
The Observer	3/5 stars
Pitchfork	6.0/10
Q	4/5 stars
Slant Magazine	4/5 stars
Spin	2/5 stars
Uncut	4/5 stars

The album received mainly positive reviews—it was featured on Uncut's list of the 50 best records of 2006 at number 18, NME's list of the 50 best records of 2006 at number 5, and Q's list of the 100 best records of 2006 at number 89. The album won the 2007 PLUG Independent Music Award for Best Punk Album.

== Track listing ==
All tracks are written by Adriano Cintra and Lovefoxxx, except where noted.

Cansei de Ser Sexy original version track listing
No.	Title	Writer(s)	Length
1.	"Fuckoff Is Not the Only Thing You Have to Show"		4:02
2.	"Alala"	Cintra, Carolina Parra, Lovefoxxx	3:58
3.	"Let's Make Love and Listen to Death from Above"		3:31
4.	"Meeting Paris Hilton"		3:11
5.	"Alcohol"		2:49
6.	"Bezzi"	Cintra, Luiza Sá, Lovefoxxx	3:04
7.	"Off the Hook"	Cintra	2:40
8.	"Art Bitch"		3:09
9.	"Acho Um Pouco Bom"	Cintra	2:58
10.	"Computer Heat"		5:03
11.	"Music Is My Hot Hot Sex"		3:07
12.	"This Month, Day 10"		3:57
13.	"Superafim"	Cintra, Carlos Dias, Clara Ribeiro	3:43
14.	"Poney Honey Money"		2:38
Total length:			47:50

International version
No.	Title	Writer(s)	Length
1.	"CSS Suxxx"		1:56
2.	"Patins"	Cintra, Sá, Lovefoxxx	2:18
3.	"Alala"	Cintra, Parra, Lovefoxxx	3:58
4.	"Let's Make Love and Listen to Death from Above"		3:31
5.	"Art Bitch"		3:09
6.	"Fuckoff Is Not the Only Thing You Have to Show"		4:02
7.	"Meeting Paris Hilton"		3:11
8.	"Off the Hook"	Cintra	2:40
9.	"Alcohol"		2:49
10.	"Music Is My Hot Hot Sex"		3:07
11.	"This Month, Day 10"		3:57
Total length:			34:38

US iTunes bonus tracks
No.	Title	Writer(s)	Length
12.	"Bezzi"	Cintra, Sá, Lovefoxxx	3:06
13.	"Poney Honey Money"		2:38

Notes

- The international version excluded five tracks from the Brazilian version (two of which appeared as bonus tracks on the US iTunes edition of the album), while including two tracks from the Brazilian-released EP CSS Suxxx.

== Personnel ==
Credits for the international version of Cansei de Ser Sexy.

CSS

- Adriano Cintra – drums (1–4, 6–9, 11); guitar (2, 5, 6, 10, 11); lead vocals (2, 9); keyboards (3); bass (4, 11); backing vocals (5); harmonica (9); mixing, producer (all tracks)
- Lovefoxxx – lead vocals (all tracks); backing vocals (4, 6); artwork, photography
- Carolina Parra – guitar (1–4, 6–9, 11); drums (5, 10), keyboards (3); mixing (all tracks)
- Ana Rezende – guitar (2–5, 7–9, 11)
- Clara Ribeiro – backing vocals (1, 3, 5, 7, 8, 10, 11)
- Luiza Sá – guitar (1, 3, 6–8, 10)
- Iracema Trevisan – bass (1–3, 5–10)
- Maria Helena Zerba – keyboards (1, 5)

Additional personnel

- João Marcello Bôscoli – executive producer
- Emanuela Carvalho – image direction
- Ricardo Garcia – mastering
- Clayton Martin – drum engineer
- Sabrina Roistacher – image coordinator
- Rodrigo Sanches – mixing
- Eduarda de Souza – photography
- André Szajman – executive producer
- Cláudio Szajman – executive producer
- Tatiana Zanini – image coordinator

== Charts ==
Chart performance for Cansei de Ser Sexy
Chart (2007)	Peak position
UK Albums (Official Charts)	69
US Top Dance Albums (Billboard)	9

== Certifications ==
Certifications for Cansei de Ser Sexy
Region	Certification	Certified units/sales
Ireland (IRMA)	Gold	7,500^{^}
United Kingdom (BPI)	Silver	60,000^{^}
^{^} Shipments figures based on certification alone.

== Release history ==
Release history and formats for Cansei de Ser Sexy
Region	Date	Label	Format(s)
Brazil	9 October 2005	Trama	CD
United States	11 July 2006	Sub Pop	CD, LP, digital download
United Kingdom	22 January 2007	Sire	CD, digital download
