= Nate Perry =

American rock bass player and songwriter

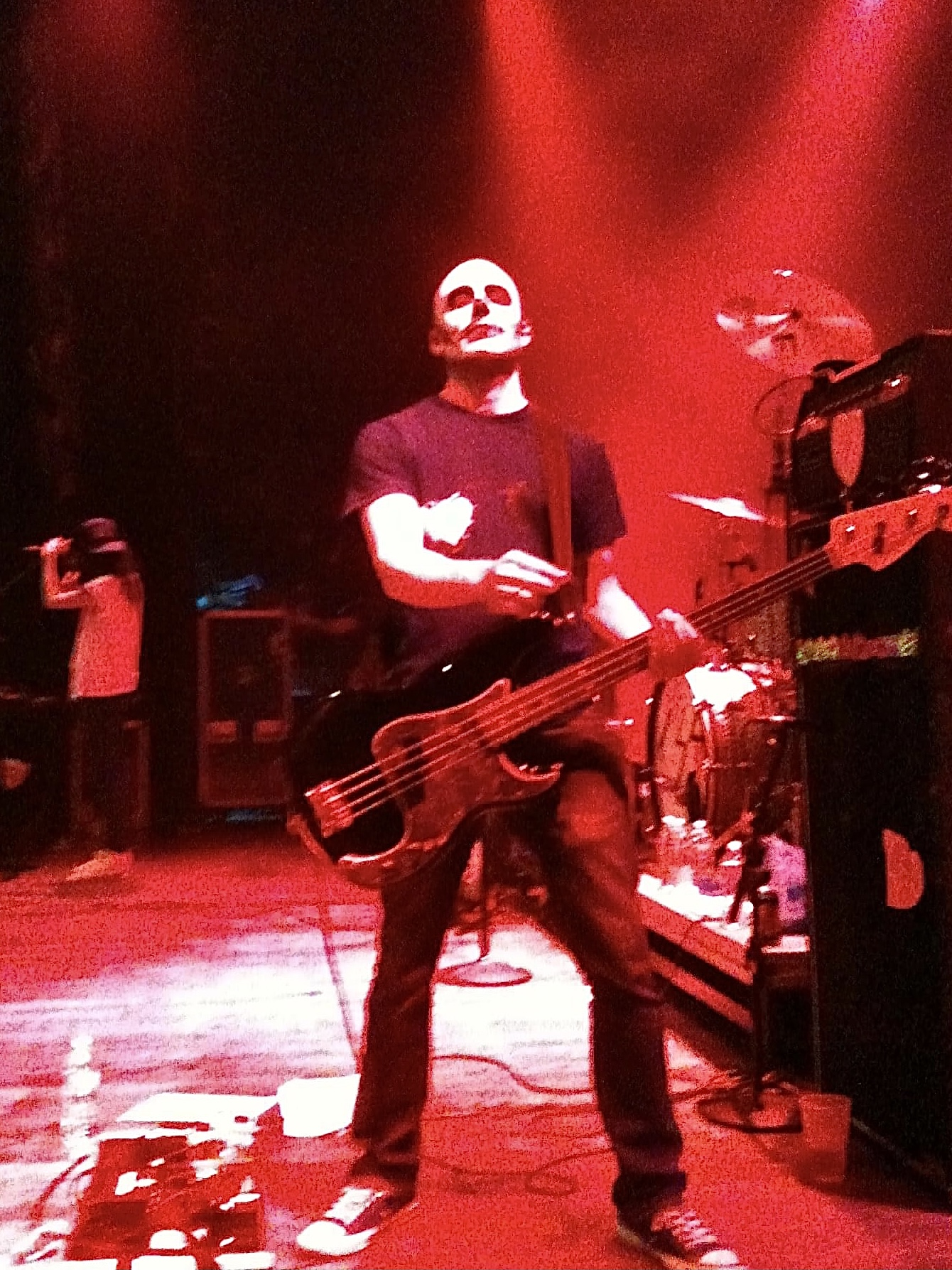
Perry performing live with CSS on Halloween in 2011

Nate Perry is an American rock bass player and songwriter. He grew up in Northern California and has been based in Los Angeles since 1999 where he has performed, toured & recorded with artists including CSS, Manic, Middle Class Rut, Zack Lopez & the Cartel, Jesse Spencer of the Fox show House, Fractional Importance, Stars Align, and Toadies guitarist Darrel Herbert. Nate currently produces concerts for Live Nation Entertainment.

== Career File ==
Nate Perry began his career at 19 as a contract bassist on cruise ships while pursuing a B.A. in music from Humboldt State University & The University of Memphis. While attending school in Memphis, he was a session player in the Beale Street music scene and appeared with The Memphis Symphony. Shortly after relocating to Los Angeles, he joined Fractional Importance who released two records independently; including Visions, recorded by Don Kazarinoff (Incubus). Fractional gained regional popularity, opening for System of a Down, Alien Ant Farm, Smile Empty Soul and Seether, before disbanding in 2004.

In 2006, Perry briefly played in pop startup Stars Align, featuring vocalist John Stephens of Neve. Following a performance at The Troubadour, the band caught the interest of guitarist Joe Don Rooney of Rascal Flatts who went on to work with the group. They released a self-titled EP in 2009, produced by Rooney, featuring Perry on bass guitar.

Dissatisfied with the band's Hot AC aspirations, Perry left Stars Align in 2007 to join experimental indie group Manic. The band released their debut EP, Floorboards on Geffen Records, which led to appearances at SXSW '07 as well as regional touring, including a residency at famed L.A. club The Echo. Their second EP, Another New Home, featured writing by Perry; including the track Carolina Ghost which received airplay on the now defunct Indie 103.1. The song was later remixed by Joel Petersen of The Faint and released as a limited edition 7" vinyl on Suretone Records. Although the band's efforts received favorable press, drawing comparisons to Pink Floyd & Radiohead, they fell short of major label sales expectations and disbanded in late 2008.

Nate performed with various L.A. based artists from 2008-2010 including former Toadies guitarist Darrel Herbert and Dwight Yoakam drummer, Mitch Marine. The trio recorded under the moniker DWH and later, No Tomorrow, self-releasing an EP in 2010. Perry also played locally with actor Jesse Spencer, known for his role on the hit show House, M.D., alongside singer Julian Sakata under the name The Ruby Fakes. In 2011 he received an M.M. from Cal State L.A. in Commercial Music where he taught as a graduate assistant.

In the fall of 2011, Perry was recruited by Brazilian Sub Pop band CSS to be their touring bassist, following the departure of original member Adriano Cintra. Nate performed with the band on tours of North America, Australia and Japan in support of their third studio album, La Liberación. During this period, the band appeared at the 2011 Falls Festival in Australia alongside Fleet Foxes and Group Love, as well as at the Corona Capital Festival in Mexico City, with The Strokes and Moby. The group was especially well received in Japan, selling out famed Tokyo venue Studio Coast. Perry continued to tour with CSS throughout 2012, doing small tours and one-off performances throughout California and the Southwest.

In 2012, Perry performed and engineered bass on several tracks off of the sophomore Middle Class Rut LP, Pick Up Your Head, released June 2013 on Bright Antenna Records. In 2016 he played bass on Zack Lopez's (MC Rut) Life on the Run record; and in 2024, he joined "Zack Lopez & the Cartel". in the studio, playing bass on several tracks from the Dark Side Times LP.

== Discography ==
With Zack Lopez & the Cartel

- Dark Side Times (2024)

With Zack Lopez

- Life on the Run (2016)

With Middle Class Rut

- Pick Up Your Head (2013) | Bright Antenna

With DWH

- EP (2010)

With Manic

- Floorboards (2007) | Geffen
- Another New Home (2007) | Suretone/Interscope
- Carolina Ghost - Broken Spindles 7-inch (2007)| Suretone/Interscope

With Stars Align

- EP (2009)

With Fractional Importance

- Popstar Guitar - EA Games/PS3 Game (2008)
- A Love Letter Suicide (2004) | Dyspathy
- Visions (2001)| Dyspathy

With Hermetic Science

- Crash Course: A Hermetic Science Primer (2009)
- Prophesies (1998)
