= Perfect Symmetry =

Perfect Symmetry may refer to:

- Perfect Symmetry (Fates Warning album), 1989
- Perfect Symmetry (Keane album), 2008
  - "Perfect Symmetry" (song)
  - Perfect Symmetry (tour), by Keane

== See also ==
- Symmetry, a harmonious proportionality, or "patterned self-similarity"
