= Alala (song) =

Single by CSS

from the album Cansei de Ser Sexy
- B-side: "Ódio, Ódio, Ódio, Sorry C."
- Released: 2005
- Recorded: March 2005
- Genre: Electronic rock, indie rock, dance-punk, alternative dance
- Label: Sub Pop
- Songwriter(s): Adriano Cintra / Lovefoxxx
- Producer(s): Adriano Cintra

CSS singles chronology
"Superafim" (2005)	"Alala" (2005)	"Let's Make Love and Listen to Death from Above" (2006)

"Alala" is the second international single by Brazilian indie electroclash band CSS, taken from their debut album Cansei de Ser Sexy.

"Alala" and "Let's Make Love and Listen to Death from Above" have been included preloaded on the Zune multimedia player, released in November 2006. It also, together with "Off the Hook", features on Forza Motorsport 2 and FIFA 08, videogames for the Xbox 360.

== Track lists ==
=== CD single ===
1. "Alala" (album version)
2. "Ódio, Ódio, Ódio, Sorry C."

=== CD Maxi ===
1. "Alala" (album version)
2. "Ódio, Ódio, Ódio, Sorry C."
3. "Alala" (Bonde do Rolê remix)
4. "Alala" (Princess Superstar remix)
5. "Alala" (a cappella mix)

=== 7" single ===
1. "Alala" (album version)
2. "Ódio, Ódio, Ódio, Sorry C."

=== 12" single ===
1. "Alala" (Princess Superstar remix)
2. "Alala" (album version)
3. "Alala" (Bonde do Rolê remix)
4. "Alala" (A cappella mix)

=== 12" Maxi ===
1. "Alala" (album version)
2. "Ódio, Ódio, Ódio, Sorry C."
3. "Alala" (Bonde do Rolê remix)
4. "Alala" (Princess Superstar remix)
5. "Alala" (a cappella mix)

== Music videos ==
The music video takes place at a party which has an intense fight, which gradually works backwards to where everyone is having fun just before the fight begins, the wounds working in reverse as well. An alternate music video directed by Daniel Zanardi, filmed at Cintra's ranch in Bragança Paulista. It shows CSS playing the song and having fun and a cardboard box "dancing", then the box eats up all the band.
