= La Liberación =

Studio album by CSS
- Released: 22 August 2011
- Studios: São Paulo, Brazil
- Label: Cooperative
- Producer: Adriano Cintra

CSS chronology
Donkey (2008)	La Liberación (2011)	Planta (2013)

Singles from La Liberación
- 1. "Hits Me Like a Rock" Released: 15 August 2011

Professional ratings
Aggregate scores
Source	Rating
Metacritic	59/100
Review scores
Source	Rating
AllMusic	3.5/5 stars
Club Fonograma	60/100
The Guardian	2/5 stars
NME	5/10 stars
Pitchfork	5.2/10

La Liberación is the third studio album by Brazilian band CSS. It was released on 22 August 2011 through Cooperative Music. It is their last album with guitarist and songwriter Adriano Cintra, who left the band in November 2011.

== Track listing ==
All tracks composed by Adriano Cintra/Lovefoxxx, unless noted otherwise.

1. "I Love You" – 3:48
2. "Hits Me Like a Rock" (featuring Bobby Gillespie) – 3:37
3. "City Grrrl" (featuring Ssion) (Cintra/Lovefoxxx/Cody Critcheloe) – 4:24
4. "Echo of Love" (Cintra/Lovefoxxx/Ana Anjos) – 3:47
5. "You Could Have It All" – 3:45
6. "La Liberación" (Cintra) – 2:13
7. "Partners in Crime" (featuring Mike Garson) – 4:12
8. "Ruby Eyes" – 2:46
9. "Rhythm to the Rebels" – 3:37
10. "Red Alert" (featuring Ratatat) – 3:28
11. "Fuck Everything" (Lovefoxxx/Carolina Parra) – 5:32

iTunes Europe bonus track
No.	Title	Length
12.	"Yolanda"	3:19

Amazon Europe digital bonus track
No.	Title	Length
12.	"Knees"	3:41

Japanese bonus tracks
No.	Title	Length
12.	"Tutti Frutti Fake"	3:17
13.	"Cats"	3:17

Japanese digital bonus track
No.	Title	Length
14.	"I Couldn't Care Less"	3:30

== Singles ==
The first single is "Hits Me Like a Rock", which features Primal Scream singer Bobby Gillespie.

== Personnel ==
- Ana Anjos – group member, lyricist
- Adriano Cintra – group member, composer, lyricist, producer, engineer, mixer
- Cody Critcheloe – vocals, lyricist
- Hana Dayies – photography
- Mike Garson – piano
- Bobby Gillespie – vocals
- Nahor Gomes – trumpet
- Hélio Leite – assistant mixer
- Lovefoxxx – group member, lyricist, artwork, handwriting, layout
- Tuco Marcondes – acoustic guitar
- Carolina Parra – group member, composer, mixer
- Ronaldão – assistant mixer
- Luiza Sá – group member, photography
- Rodrigo Sanches – acoustic drums, engineer, mixer

== Charts ==
Chart performance for La Liberación
Chart (2011)	Peak position
Japanese Albums (Oricon)	50
UK Albums (OCC)	180
