= Let's Make Love and Listen to Death from Above =

2005 single by CSS

Single by CSS

from the album Cansei de Ser Sexy
- B-side: "Acho Um Pouco Bom"; "Pretend We're Dead" (live)
- Released: September 4, 2005 (CD, 7"); August 13, 2005 (12"); May 14, 2007 (reissue – CD, 7", 12")
- Recorded: 2005
- Genre: Electroclash; synth-pop
- Length: 3:30
- Label: Sub Pop
- Songwriter(s): Adriano Cintra; Luísa Matsushita
- Producer(s): Adriano Cintra

CSS singles chronology
"Let's Make Love and Listen to Death from Above" (2005)	"Bezzi" (2005)
"Off the Hook" (2007)	"Let's Make Love and Listen to Death from Above" (2007)	"Alcohol" (2007)

"Let's Make Love and Listen to Death from Above" is the first international single by Brazilian band CSS, taken from their debut studio album, Cansei de Ser Sexy.

== Background and release ==
The title is a reference to Canadian band Death from Above. The song's video was directed by Cat Solen and the track was later commercially released in several formats. It reached number 39 on the UK Singles Chart after it was re-issued in May 2007.

The B-side for "Let's Make Love and Listen to Death from Above" is the cut "Acho Um Pouco Bom" (roughly "I think it's a bit good", in Portuguese).

== Accolades and media ==
The song was rated as the sixth best track of the year 2006 by the NME magazine and named the 299th best song of the 2000s by Pitchfork Media. In October 2011, NME placed it at number 94 on its list "150 Best Tracks of the Past 15 Years".

Following its use in promotions for the TV series, Ugly Betty, the track was re-released in the United Kingdom. It was also used in trailers for the BBC Three series, Gavin & Stacey, for the TV advertising of the Chloé Fragrance, and on the Microsoft Zune music player as pre-loaded content.

== Track listing ==
=== 2005 release ===
1. "Let's Make Love and Listen to Death from Above" (album version)
2. "Let's Make Love and Listen to Death from Above" (Spank Rock remix)
3. "Let's Make Love and Listen to Death from Above" (Diplo remix)
4. "Let's Make Love and Listen to Death from Above" (instrumental)
5. "Acho Um Pouco Bom" (Let's Make Love single version)

=== 2007 release ===
1. "Let's Make Love and Listen to Death from Above" (Simian Mobile Disco remix)
2. "Let's Make Love and Listen to Death from Above" (Hot Chip remix)
3. "Let's Make Love and Listen to Death from Above" (Calvin Harris remix)
4. "Pretend We're Dead" (live)¹
5. "Alala" (Bonde do Rolê remix)
6. "Let's Make Love and Listen to Death from Above" (album version)

¹ A cover song of L7.
