= Hits Me Like a Rock =

Single by CSS featuring Bobby Gillespie

from the album La Liberación
- A-side: "Hits Me Like a Rock"
- B-side: "Tutti Frutti Fake"
- Released: August 15, 2011
- Recorded: 2010
- Genre: Synthpop
- Length: 3:37
- Label: Cooperative Music
- Songwriter(s): Adriano Cintra; Lovefoxxx
- Producer(s): Adriano Cintra

CSS singles chronology
"Move" (2008)	"Hits Me Like a Rock" (2011)	"La Liberación" (2011)

"Hits Me Like a Rock" is a song by Brazilian band CSS featuring Bobby Gillespie of Scottish band Primal Scream. It was released as the lead single from their third studio album La Liberación.

The song is featured as soundtrack in EA Sports game, FIFA 12.

== Track listing ==
Digital EP released on iTunes Japan only (July 6, 2011)

1. Hits Me Like a Rock
2. Tutti Frutti Fake
3. Hits Me Like a Rock (Depressed Buttons Mix)
4. Hits Me Like a Rock (Designer Drugs Remix)
5. Hits Me Like a Rock (Kido Yoji Remix)
