= Punk funk (disambiguation) =

Punk funk is a music genre combining both punk rock and funk influences.

Punk funk may also refer to:

- Dance-punk
- Avant-funk
- Funk metal
