= Art Bitch =

Art Bitch may refer to:

- "Art Bitch", a 2005 song by CSS from their album Cansei de Ser Sexy
- "Art Bitch", a 2008 song by Charli XCX
