= The Lovers Are Losing =

Single by Keane

from the album Perfect Symmetry
- Released: 20 October 2008
- Studio: Teldex Studios, Berlin
- Genre: Alternative rock, pop rock
- Length: 5:04 (album version); 3:48 (radio edit)
- Label: Island
- Songwriter(s): Tim Rice-Oxley; Tom Chaplin; Richard Hughes
- Producer(s): Keane

Keane singles chronology
"Spiralling" (2008)	"The Lovers Are Losing" (2008)	"Perfect Symmetry" (2008)

Music video
- "The Lovers Are Losing" on YouTube

"The Lovers Are Losing" is a song performed and composed by English rock band Keane, released on 20 October 2008 as the second single from their third album, Perfect Symmetry. It was played for first the time on Hit40uk on 24 August 2008.

== Track listing ==
=== CD single ===
1. "The Lovers Are Losing" – 5:06
2. "Time to Go" – 3:50

=== 7" single ===
1. "The Lovers Are Losing" – 5:04
2. "Time to Go" – 3:49

=== Digital download bundle #1 ===
1. "The Lovers Are Losing" (radio edit) – 3:48

=== Digital download bundle #2 ===
1. "The Lovers Are Losing" – 5:04
2. "Time to Go" – 3:49

=== Digital download bundle #3 ===
1. "The Lovers Are Losing" (live from the Forum) – 5:24
2. "The Lovers Are Losing" (demo) – 5:17
3. "The Lovers Are Losing" (CSS remix) – 4:35

== Release history ==
Country	Date
United States	30 September 2008
United Kingdom	20 October 2008

== Music video ==
The music video for the song was released on 1 October, and features singer Tom Chaplin running through the wild and being shot at, with scenes of bombardments by jet aircraft.

== Chart performance ==
Despite being released as the first physical release taken from Perfect Symmetry, "The Lovers Are Losing" underperformed in the UK Singles Chart and performed even worse than Keane's previous single "Spiralling" which peaked at #23 despite not being physically released. This single was to peak at a disappointing #52, making it Keane's first single to fail to dent the UK Top 40. It spent three weeks in the UK Top 100.

== Charts ==
Chart (2008)	Peak position
Belgian Flanders Singles Chart	50
Dutch Top 40	30
Japan (Japan Hot 100)	66
Norwegian Singles Chart	19
UK Singles Chart	52
Singapore 987FM Top 20	20
US Billboard Triple A	12
