= PopStar Guitar =

2008 video game

- European Wii box art
- Developer: Broadsword Interactive
- Publisher: XS Games
- Platforms: Wii, PlayStation 2
- Release: November 18, 2008
- Genre: Music game
- Modes: Single-player, multiplayer

PopStar Guitar is a music game for the Wii and PlayStation 2 developed by British studio Broadsword Interactive and published by XS Games.

== Gameplay ==
In PopStar Guitar, players embark on a journey as a budding guitarist with aspirations of becoming the ultimate pop music sensation. Throughout the game, players develop skills to help them achieve their goal of success on the main stage of a worldwide Battle of the Bands competition, which will bring them international stardom.

The career mode will see the player starting as a member of a garage band before touring across the 25 different in game venues before performing at the Battle Of The Bands. The game features 12 playable characters (6 male/6 female) to choose from, and players are able to customize their look and the instruments they play.

The game is played similar to other music games with players trying to press buttons as they follow scrolling notes onscreen. The PlayStation 2 version supports guitar controllers for play, while the Wii version comes packaged with one AirG controller shell allowing players to play air guitar-style using only the Wii Remote and Nunchuk.

== Soundtrack ==
The game features a line-up of 60 songs, which includes original mastered tracks from pop and rock artists. Half the setlist are songs credited as "Indie". These songs include:

Song	Artist	Master recording?
"When I'm Gone"	3 Doors Down	Yes
"It's Not My Time"	3 Doors Down	Yes
"Dirty Little Secret"	The All-American Rejects	Yes
"Move Along"	The All-American Rejects	Yes
"Thnks Fr Th Mmrs"	Fall Out Boy	Yes
"Sugar, We're Goin Down"	Fall Out Boy	Yes
"Makes Me Wonder"	Maroon 5	Yes
"Wake Up Call"	Maroon 5	Yes
"Shut Up and Drive"	Rihanna	Yes
"All The Small Things"	Blink 182	Yes
"Welcome to My Life"	Simple Plan	Yes
"Misery Business"	Paramore	Yes
"S.O.S"	Jonas Brothers	Yes
"See You Again"	Miley Cyrus	Yes
"Our Time Now"	Plain White T's	No
"Girlfriend"	Avril Lavigne	No
"Hot"	Avril Lavigne	No
"Before He Cheats"	Carrie Underwood	No
"Dance Floor Anthem (I Don't Want to Be in Love)"	Good Charlotte	No
"Since U Been Gone"	Kelly Clarkson	No
"Face Down"	Red Jumpsuit Apparatus	No
"Hero/Heroine"	Boys Like Girls	No
"Anna Molly"	Incubus	No
"Suddenly I See"	KT Tunstall	No
"The Saints Are Coming"	Green Day & U2	No
"How's It Going to Be"	Third Eye Blind	No
"1985"	Bowling for Soup	No
"I Write Sins Not Tragedies"	Panic! At The Disco	No
"Honestly"	Cartel	No
"It's Not Over"	Daughtry	No
"In Vain"	Under The Flood	Yes
"Renovators Boogie"	The Renovators	Yes
"All She Left Me Was The Blues"	The Renovators	Yes
"So Cool"	Vibrolux	Yes
"Hear Me Talkin'"	Blues Kings	Yes
"Sweet Rock N Roll"	Vibrolux	Yes
"Wonder"	Hyper Maru	Yes
"Broken Wings"	Slant	Yes
"Across The World"	Red Horizon	Yes
"When The Rain Comes Down Again"	Zox	Yes
"The Best Of The Worst"	Mitch Allan	Yes
"Go (aka Go Your Way)"	The Kin	Yes
"High And Dry"	Valeze	Yes
"Setting Sun"	Terra Diablo	Yes
"Glitterbug"	Slinky Vagabond	Yes
"Since You Walked Out My Door"	Blues Kings	Yes
"Heaven Helps Us All"	The Premiums	Yes
"White Lightning"	The Premiums	Yes
"All I Really Want"	The Premiums	Yes
"Car Crash"	The Day After	Yes
"Guilty"	Weedeeter	Yes
"Don't Say Anything"	Mojophonic	Yes
"See You Around"	Dimtribe	Yes
"One Last Time"	Dimtribe	Yes
"Better Off"	Dimtribe	Yes
"Start a Fire"	Fractional	Yes
"Are You Afraid"	Fractional	Yes
"Too Far Gone"	Fractional	Yes
"On The Rocks"	Lez Zeppelin	Yes
"Control"	Weedeeter	Yes

== Reception ==
IGN called the Wii version of the game "a wholly unnecessary piece of shovelware" that was "clunky, fugly" and with a "bottom-of-the-barrel" soundtrack, though they believed the AirG peripheral worked well. They gave it 3.5/10.

== See also ==
- Rock Band
- Guitar Hero
- Rock Revolution
- Ultimate Band
