= Fractional Importance =

Fractional Importance is a modern rock band from Los Angeles, California formed in 1998, consisting of Doug Gledhill (lead vocals and guitar), Nate Perry (bass and backing vocals) and Kevin Fessler (drums). Their sound has been described as ranging from alternative metal and post-hardcore to modern rock. Although the band never enjoyed mainstream success, they were one of the few independent rock bands to emerge from the saturated late 1990s Hollywood club scene who, through largely self-funded touring and relentless promotion, were able to amass a sizable fan base and influence younger L.A. based bands coming up on the same scene.

== History ==
The original line-up consisted of Douglas Gledhill (Vocals/Guitar), Kevin Fessler (Drums) and John Holiday (Bass) who met while attending high school in Santa Clarita, CA. Shortly after their inception they self-released the LP Indecision, followed by well-received shows on the famed Hollywood Sunset Strip. This was followed by the Apathy EP, produced by Donat Kazarinoff (Hoobastank, Alien Ant Farm). Bassist John Holiday left shortly thereafter and was replaced by Nate Perry, who assumed bass and co-writing duties. The band rejoined Kazarinoff at 4th Street Recording in 2001 to record their sophomore LP Visions which was released on the band's own Dyspathy Records and sold over 7,000 copies with no major distribution. The record was well received by various indie-rock critics and combined with relentless DIY touring, helped to solidify the band's growing regional popularity while also raising the band's awareness on a more national level; opening for such acts as Papa Roach, Smile Empty Soul and Seether.

After extensive touring throughout the western portion of the U.S. in support of Visions, the band shortened their name to 'Fractional' in 2003 and signed with 11 Records, the vanity label of producer John Travis(Kid Rock, Buckcherry). Travis produced demos of the band which featured drummer Chris Robyn from the influential rock band Far. They temporarily added Zack Lopez on second guitar to fatten up the live sound who played on their 2005 EP A Love Letter Suicide which included tracks recorded by Travis. By this time Fractional began receiving airplay on various college and commercial radio stations nationwide which scored the band opening slots for Smile Empty Soul, Seether, Trapt and Crossfade.

Despite several independent releases and playing nearly 1000 shows, Fractional failed to see commercial success and parted ways in 2005 to pursue other projects. Douglas Gledhill formed the band Un:armed with his brother Derek Gledhill. Nate Perry went on to play in the band Manic who released two EP's on Suretone/Interscope Records in 2007.

In 2008, 3 songs from the band appeared in the video game Popstar Guitar.

== Discography ==
Full Lengths

- Indecision (1998)
- Visions (2001)

EP's

- Apathy (1999)
- A Love Letter Suicide (2005)

Demos

- Roger Sommers/Royaltone Demo (2002)
- Simple Things Demo (2003)
- Island Records/Don Kazarinoff Demo (2004)
- John Travis/11 Records Demo (2004)
