= Music Is My Hot Hot Sex =

Single by Cansei de Ser Sexy

from the album Cansei de Ser Sexy
- Released: 2007
- Genre: New rave; electroclash
- Length: 3:07
- Label: Sub Pop, WEA/Warner
- Songwriter: Adriano Cintra
- Producer: Adriano Cintra

Cansei de Ser Sexy singles chronology
"Alcohol" (2007)	"Music Is My Hot Hot Sex" (2007)	"Rat Is Dead (Rage)" (2008)

"Music Is My Hot Hot Sex" is a single by Brazilian band Cansei de Ser Sexy from their first album Cansei de Ser Sexy.

The song was featured in a Zune advertisement in 2006 and again in an iPod advertisement in 2007.

An 18-year-old British student, Nick Haley, used the song in a homemade 30-second commercial for the iPod Touch that he created and then posted on the video sharing site YouTube on September 11, 2007. Creative executives from Apple's advertising agency, TBWA\Chiat\Day, saw Haley's creation, contacted him and enlisted him to remake it as a broadcast version. The spot began airing in the U.S. on October 28, 2007.

The song is initially sung in English, but ends with a rap in Portuguese.

== Music video ==
No official video has been released for this single. An unofficial fan-produced video received an overwhelmingly large number of views on YouTube. It was removed from the YouTube most-viewed list for a short time pending an investigation by YouTube, but was then reinstated. On March 15, 2008 the poster of this fan video removed it from YouTube, though it remained on the most-viewed list for a short time afterwards.

The unofficial video would be the first video on YouTube to surpass 100 million views, it did so around March 2008. This record wouldn't be reached again until Avril Lavigne's "Girlfriend" would reach the milestone around October 2008, later surpassing the peak "Music Is My Hot Hot Sex" around January 2009.

== See also ==
- List of most-viewed YouTube videos
