= Punk funk =

Music genre that combines elements of punk rock and funk

- Stylistic origins: Punk rock; funk
- Cultural origins: Late 1970s
- Derivative forms: Avant-funk; dance-punk; funk metal

Regional scenes
- California; United Kingdom

Other topics
- Post-punk; electropunk; free jazz; no wave; funk rock; psychedelic funk

Punk funk (also hyphenated as punk-funk) is a music fusion genre that typically combine punk rock and funk influences. It gave way to and is closely associated with dance-punk, avant-funk, and funk metal, all of which are also alternatively described as punk funk. The term punk funk has been used to describe Cansei de Ser Sexy by CSS, Minutemen, whose nimble punk funk was compared to Gang of Four by music critic Simon Reynolds, and "Precious" by the Jam, described by Uncut as "hypnotically, itchy, punk funk".

== History ==
Punk funk emerged in the late 1970s, however, it was eclipsed in the 1980s by dance-punk, avant-funk, and funk metal later in the 1980s, all of which are also alternatively described as punk funk. Despite this, punk funk has been occasionally used in more recent years to describe bands such as CSS and their 2005 album Cansei de Ser Sexy.

=== 1970s ===
Ian Dury and the Blockheads, formed in 1977, have been described as punk funk. The earliest punk funk band is probably Talking Heads, having formed in 1975. Their track "Psycho Killer" opens with a funky bassline, and following this, they brought in Bernie Worrell from Funkadelic into their live band.

=== 1980s ===
Beginning in the 1980s, punk funk itself metamorphosised into dance-punk, avant-funk, and funk metal. Almost all punk funk bands were swept up into these new genres; Gang of Four has been described as dance-punk. The Jam split up in 1982, and its member Paul Weller formed the Style Council a year later, which saw Weller take his music in a more soulful direction, which was only hinted at on later Jam releases. Following Minutemen's 1985 breakup, George Hurley and Mike Watt would take their music into a more experimental vein with Firehose, although hints of Minutemen's blend of punk, funk, and free jazz could be heard. However, one group associated with punk funk which emerged in the UK during this period was the Higsons.

In the 1980s, Rick James would break through with his biggest commercial success in "Super Freak". He has, over the years, branded himself as the "King of punk funk", and The New York Times and Bay State Banner have noted his punk funk sound. uDiscover Music argues that the punk context was in his street attitude, and not in a musical one.

=== 2000s ===
In 2005, CSS released Cansei de Ser Sexy, which has been described as punk funk by Australian newspaper The Age.

=== 2020s ===
Earth by EOB has been described as punk funk by Pitchfork.
