= Left Behind (CSS song) =

Single by CSS

from the album Donkey
- B-side: "Cannonball"; "Blackwing"; "I Fly" (demo)
- Released: July 14, 2008
- Genre: Synthpop
- Length: 3:31
- Label: Sub Pop, Warner Bros. Records
- Songwriter(s): Adriano Cintra
- Producer(s): Adriano Cintra

CSS singles chronology
"Rat Is Dead (Rage)" (2008)	"Left Behind" (2008)	"Move" (2008)

Alternative covers
- UK 7" Vinyl

"Left Behind" is a single by Brazilian band CSS. It was released in July, 14th as the second single and first to have a physical release from their second album, Donkey. It charted at #78 in the UK and at #18 in Finland.

== Music video ==
A music video for the song was released on July 14, 2008 at CSS' official YouTube channel. The clip shows Renata Abbade, who also directed and produced the video, using masks of CSS faces and dancing the song. The official video directed by Abbade was put together after the original video was cancelled following its completion due to a British girl murdered in Brasil while on vacation, her body was dumped in two suitcases and dumped in a river, the original video featured members of the band packed into a suitcase and was deemed in bad taste. Due to the hurried nature of the second video the band members were not available for filming and hence the masks were used. The original video leaked on a Russian video hosting site in 2017.

== Track listing ==
UK CD
(WEA449CD; Released: 14 July 2008)

1. "Left Behind" - 3:31
2. "Cannonball" - 3:23

UK 7" Vinyl
(WEA449; Released: July, 2008)

Side A

1. "Left Behind"

Side B

1. "Blackwing"

UK 7" Vinyl
(WEA449X; Released: July, 2008)

Side A

1. "Left Behind"

Side B

1. "I Fly" (Demo)
