= Rat Is Dead (Rage) =

Single by CSS

from the album Donkey
- Released: April 28, 2008
- Studio: Trama Studios, São Paulo, Brazil
- Length: 3:19
- Label: Sub Pop, Warner Bros.
- Songwriter(s): Adriano Cintra
- Producer(s): Adriano Cintra

CSS singles chronology
"Music Is My Hot Hot Sex" (2007)	"Rat Is Dead (Rage)" (2008)	"Left Behind" (2008)

"Rat Is Dead (Rage)" is a song from Brazilian band CSS.

It was released on April 28, 2008, as the first single from their second album, Donkey. The song was made available as a free download on the band's official website on April 28, 2008. Adriano Cintra has said that this song, together with "Give Up", are the rockiest songs on the album. The song was later featured on the soundtrack of the 2008 video game Midnight Club: Los Angeles.

== Music video ==
A music video for the song was directed by Nima Nourizadeh. The video consists of the band playing the song in one continuous take. It can be seen on YouTube.
