= Iracema Trevisan =

Brazilian musician (born 1982)

Iracema Trevisan Carneiro
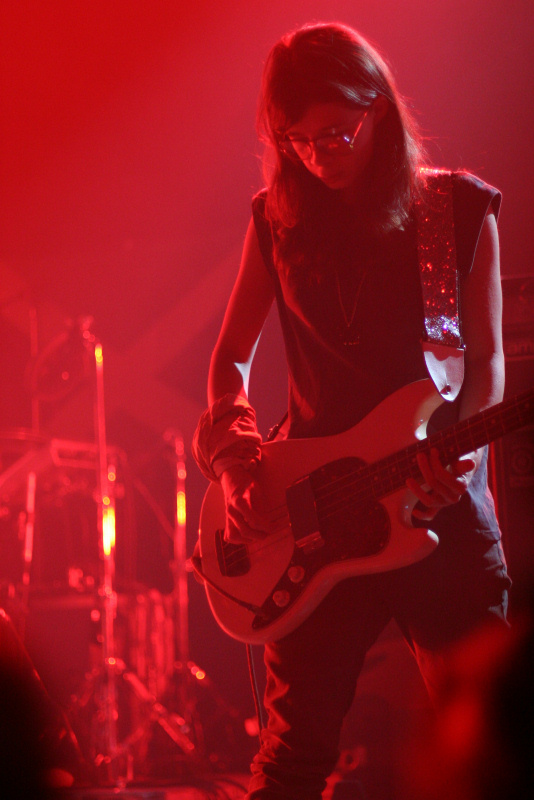
- Trevisan in 2007

Background information
- Also known as: Ira
- Born: 28 September 1982 (age 44)
- Origin: Poços de Caldas, Minas Gerais, Brazil
- Instrument: Bass
- Formerly of: Cansei de Ser Sexy

Iracema Trevisan Carneiro (born 28 September 1982 in Poços de Caldas, Minas Gerais), also known as Ira, is a Brazilian designer. She was the bassist for Brazilian indie-electro band CSS.

She studied fashion design at college and worked as style assistant for designer Alexandre Herchcovitch in São Paulo before joining CSS.

She left the band in April 2008. Now living in Paris, she continues her career as a designer, working with Augmented Reality and textile design. She has founded a brand of scarves, Heart Heart Heart and Sun Creative Studio. She graduated the IFM fashion design program.
