= Spiralling =

2008 single by Keane

Single by Keane

from the album Perfect Symmetry
- Released: 4 August 2008
- Recorded: 2008
- Studio: Teldex Studios, Berlin
- Length: 4:19 (album); 3:26 (radio)
- Label: Island
- Songwriters: Tim Rice-Oxley; Tom Chaplin; Richard Hughes; Jesse Quin
- Producer: Keane

Keane singles chronology
"The Night Sky" (2007)	"Spiralling" (2008)	"The Lovers Are Losing" (2008)

Audio sample
- file; help

"Spiralling" is a song released by Keane on 4 August 2008 at 10:59 (CEST) as the first single of their third album, Perfect Symmetry. It was released in a similar fashion to that of "Atlantic" as a digital download only single; however, it was available as a free download from Keanemusic.com for the first week of release. On 31 July, the message "When we fall in love, we're just falling in love with ourselves" appeared on the band's website in reference to the track. On 11 August 2008, the song was released as an official digital download on various online music stores. The song was said to be inspired by wrestling legend Ric Flair who Tom Chaplin described as a personal hero for his try hard mentality in the ring. His trademark "woo" inspired the song. Frontman Tom Chaplin described the song as "a train of thought about human endeavour, built on an outrageous groove".

The song went on to become the most broadcast song in the world during its first week of release, as well as the fastest-downloading song ever for Universal, reaching 500,000 downloads in less than a week.

Keane performed the song live to an audience for the first time at the 2008 GQ Awards on 2 September 2008.

The song won Best Track at the Q Awards on 6 October 2008, with all three members of the band present at the ceremony to accept the award. In 2013, Christopher McBride of Drowned in Sound said the song "showcased Keane, for perhaps the only time in their career, in exhilarating day-glo mode. It is a sleek, shiny number which is no doubt one of the great pop singles of the past five years."

The song was covered by Sugababes as a B-side to their 2008 single No Can Do.

== Track listing ==
=== UK 7" vinyl ===
1. "Spiralling"
  - A special one-sided limited edition 7" of 1,000 copies of the single was released and sent to members of the messageboard. The single came inside a special box designed to contain the remaining singles of the "Perfect Symmetry era" (similar to the one released with "Atlantic")

=== US 7" vinyl ===
1. "Spiralling"
2. "Spiralling" (Diplo vs Keane Mad Spirals Mix)
  - Promo issued on Interscope with the same artwork as the UK version.

== Music video ==
The robots of the video "Spiralling"

The music video for "Spiralling" was released on the Keane Official Website on 26 September. Composer Tim Rice-Oxley left a note reading "Andras Ketzer has perfectly represented the difference between the idealised dream and the dystopian reality of human existence". It features robots walking in such a manner of the I, Robot film adaptation and shots of lead singer Tom Chaplin staring at TV sets while sitting in a couch. There are also shots of him singing the song from inside a blue room.

== Release history ==
Country	Date
United Kingdom	4 August 2008
Mexico	5 August 2008

== Charts ==
On 17 August 2008, the song entered the UK Singles Chart at #28 on downloads alone and peaked at #23 without a video or physical release. The song has spent 10 weeks in the UK Top 40 without entering the Top 20. Despite remaining as Keane's longest lasting single in the UK Top 100 (18 weeks), it became the band's joint-lowest charting single at the time mainly due to it not being physically released. However, it marked the band's ninth consecutive UK Top 40 single.

The song debuted on #26 in the Dutch Top 40 on 23 August 2008 issue and peaked at #12.

On 5 October 2008, the song re-entered the UK Singles Chart at #36 and peaked at #23 again.

=== Weekly charts ===
Chart (2008)	Peak position
Belgium (Ultratop 50 Flanders)	41
Belgium (Ultratip Bubbling Under Wallonia)	22
Canada Hot 100 (Billboard)	52
European Hot 100 Singles	66
Germany (GfK)	83
Ireland (IRMA)	22
Netherlands (Dutch Top 40)	12
Netherlands (Single Top 100)	29
UK Singles (OCC)	23

=== Year-end charts ===
Chart (2008)	Position
Netherlands (Dutch Top 40)	91
UK Singles (Official Charts Company)	131

== Covers ==
Sugababes performed an acoustic cover of "Spiralling" in the BBC Radio 1 Live Lounge on 9 October 2008 and features on the "No Can Do" Single which peaked also at #23.
