= Perfect Symmetry (song) =

Single by Keane

from the album Perfect Symmetry
- Released: 29 December 2008
- Studio: Teldex (Berlin)
- Genre: Piano rock
- Length: 5:12 (album version); 3:58 (radio edit)
- Label: Island
- Songwriter(s): Tim Rice-Oxley; Tom Chaplin; Richard Hughes
- Producer(s): Keane

Keane singles chronology
"The Lovers Are Losing" (2008)	"Perfect Symmetry" (2008)	"Better Than This" (2009)

Music video
- "Perfect Symmetry" on YouTube

"Perfect Symmetry" is a song by English rock band Keane. It was released on 29 December 2008 as the third single and is the title track from their third album of the same name.

The radio edit version of the 7" single rearranges the song somewhat, the second verse being taken from the original first verse, and the original second verse being removed completely. It also cuts out the introduction at the beginning and the lines "...hide in churches / Pieces of pieces of rush hour buses / I dream in e-mails...", although these lines are not removed in the end.

== Track listing ==
=== CD single ===
1. "Perfect Symmetry" – 5:12
2. "Staring at the Ceiling" – 3:52

=== 7" single ===
1. "Perfect Symmetry" – 3:58
2. "Staring at the Ceiling" – 3:52

== Music video ==
The music video for the song was released on 19 November. It features the band inside a future-like glass room with a television screen that shows a video of Chaplin singing the song. The band members are also seen in another room doing various things. Different items appear throughout the video, usually aligned symmetrically to reflect the song's lyrics. During the start of each chorus, a different location in the world is shown (e.g. a waterfall in the first and mountains in the second).

== Chart performance ==
The single reached #150 in the UK Singles Chart, the lowest position for an officially released Keane single in the UK.

=== Charts ===
Chart (2008)	Peak position
Belgium (Ultratip Bubbling Under Wallonia)	20
UK Singles (Official Charts Company)	150
