= Perfect Symmetry (Keane album) =

2008 album by Keane

Studio album by Keane
- Released: 13 October 2008
- Recorded: 2008
- Studios: Teldex (Berlin); Studio de la Grande Armée (Paris); Olympic (London); The Barn (London)
- Genres: Pop rock; alternative rock; progressive pop; synth-pop
- Length: 50:43
- Label: Island
- Producers: Keane; Jon Brion (track 4); Stuart Price (tracks 7 and 10)

Keane chronology
Live 06 (2006)	Perfect Symmetry (2008)	Night Train (2010)

Singles from Perfect Symmetry
- 1. "Spiralling" Released: 4 August 2008; 2. "The Lovers Are Losing" Released: 20 October 2008; 3. "Perfect Symmetry" Released: 29 December 2008; 4. "Better Than This" Released: 16 March 2009

Professional ratings
Aggregate scores
Source	Rating
Metacritic	64/100
Review scores
Source	Rating
AllMusic	3.5/5 stars
Entertainment Weekly	B+
The Guardian	3/5 stars
musicOMH	3/5 stars
NME	1/5 stars
PopMatters	6/10
Q	4/5 stars
Rolling Stone	3.5/5 stars
Spin	7/10
Uncut	3/5 stars

Perfect Symmetry is the third studio album by English rock band Keane, released on 13 October 2008 in the United Kingdom.

== Cover ==
The cover for the album was revealed on 5 September. Tim Rice-Oxley explained that the imagery of the band is photographs of bigger-than-life-size sculptures of the band members, made by Korean artist Osang Gwon. It was implied that these sculptures would form the basis of the album's image and promotion up to the date of release.

== Perfect Symmetry World Tour ==
The Perfect Symmetry World Tour started on 29 September 2008 and finished on 29 October 2009, with 121 shows. During the Perfect Symmetry album release week, the band did some free shows in the UK.

== Critical reception ==
Perfect Symmetry received mixed-to-positive reviews from critics. On the aggregate website Metacritic, it has a score of 64/100, indicating "generally positive reviews". Spin gave the album 7/10 and praised the band for expanding their musical palette. Slant gave the album a lukewarm review and ultimately considered it a downgrade from the band's two previous albums.

NME heavily panned the album, giving it a 1/5 and negatively comparing it to British new rave band Klaxons.

Perfect Symmetry was likened to the synth-pop artists Orchestral Manoeuvres in the Dark (OMD) and Midge Ure.

== Track listing ==
All tracks are written by Keane.

No.	Title	Producer(s)	Length
1.	"Spiralling"	Keane	4:19
2.	"The Lovers Are Losing"	Keane	5:04
3.	"Better Than This"	Keane	4:03
4.	"You Haven't Told Me Anything"	Keane, Jon Brion^	3:47
5.	"Perfect Symmetry"	Keane	5:12
6.	"You Don't See Me"	Keane	4:03
7.	"Again and Again"	Keane, Stuart Price*	3:50
8.	"Playing Along"	Keane	5:35
9.	"Pretend That You're Alone"	Keane	3:47
10.	"Black Burning Heart"	Keane, Stuart Price*	5:23
11.	"Love Is the End"	Keane	5:37
Total length:			50:43

iTunes Store edition additional tracks
No.	Title	Length
12.	"Time to Go"	3:50
13.	"My Shadow" (pre-order bonus track)	4:52

Japan edition additional tracks
No.	Title	Length
12.	"My Shadow"	4:49
13.	"Time to Go"	3:50
14.	"The Lovers Are Losing" (CSS remix)	4:35
15.	"Spiralling" (Diplo vs. Keane "Mad Spirals Mix")	5:22
16.	"Perfect Symmetry" (Frankmusik remix)	4:56

Notes

(^) denotes additional production
(*) denotes co-producer

=== Bonus DVD ===
1. Making of Perfect Symmetry documentary
2. Track by track commentary
3. "Spiralling" (live rehearsal)
4. "Spiralling" (demo)
5. "The Lovers Are Losing" (demo)
6. "Better Than This" (demo)
7. "You Haven't Told Me Anything" (demo)
8. "Perfect Symmetry" (demo)
9. "You Don't See Me" (demo)
10. "Again and Again" (demo)
11. "Playing Along" (demo)
12. "Pretend That You're Alone" (demo)
13. "Black Burning Heart" (demo)
14. "Love Is the End" (demo)

== In popular culture ==
The album's eleventh song "Love Is the End" was featured on the 18th episode from the sixth season of the series One Tree Hill.

== Personnel ==
Keane

- Tom Chaplin – vocals, guitar
- Tim Rice-Oxley – piano, keyboards, guitar, percussion, synthesizers, composition, backing vocals
- Richard Hughes – drums, percussion, backing vocals

Additional personnel

- Jesse Quin – bass, guitar (on "Black Burning Heart"), percussion, backing vocals
- Stephen Hussey – violin (on "Love Is the End")
- Chris Fish – cello (on "Love Is the End")
- Jo Silverston; Ian Harris – musical saw (on "Love Is the End")
- Jim Hunt – saxophone (on "Pretend That You're Alone")
- Anaël Train – French vocal (on "Black Burning Heart")
- Jake Davies – engineering
- Mark "Spike" Stent – mixing and additional production
- Stuart Price – co-production (for "Again and Again" and "Black Burning Heart")
- Jon Brion – additional production (for "You Haven't Told Me Anything")
- Scott Johnson – on Studio Tech
- Stephen Marcussen – mastering
- Beth Louise Warren – band assistance and recording co-ordinator
- Osang Gwon – sculptures for booklet
- Rob Chenery at Tourist – design and art direction
- Shamil Tanna – photography
- Adam Tudhope – managing

== Charts ==
=== Weekly charts ===
Chart (2008)	Peak position
Australian Albums (ARIA)	33
Austrian Albums (Ö3 Austria)	22
Belgian Albums (Ultratop Flanders)	10
Belgian Albums (Ultratop Wallonia)	7
Canadian Albums (Billboard)	7
Danish Albums (Hitlisten)	26
Dutch Albums (Album Top 100)	3
French Albums (SNEP)	42
German Albums (Offizielle Top 100)	10
Hungarian Albums (MAHASZ)	39
Irish Albums (IRMA)	4
Italian Albums (FIMI)	32
Mexican Albums (Top 100 Mexico)	9
New Zealand Albums (RMNZ)	17
Norwegian Albums (VG-lista)	7
Portuguese Albums (AFP)	5
Scottish Albums (Official Charts)	3
Spanish Albums (Promusicae)	12
Swedish Albums (Sverigetopplistan)	18
Swiss Albums (Schweizer Hitparade)	6
UK Albums (Official Charts)	1
US Billboard 200	7
US Top Rock Albums (Billboard)	4

=== Year-end charts ===
Chart (2008)	Position
Dutch Albums (Album Top 100)	66
UK Albums (OCC)	49

Chart (2009)	Position
UK Albums (OCC)	175

== Certifications and sales ==
Region	Certification	Certified units/sales
Ireland (IRMA)	Gold	7,500^{^}
United Kingdom (BPI)	Platinum	300,000^{^}
United States	—	135,000
^{^} Shipments figures based on certification alone.

== See also ==
- List of songs by Keane
