= Ana Rezende =

Brazilian film director (born 1984)

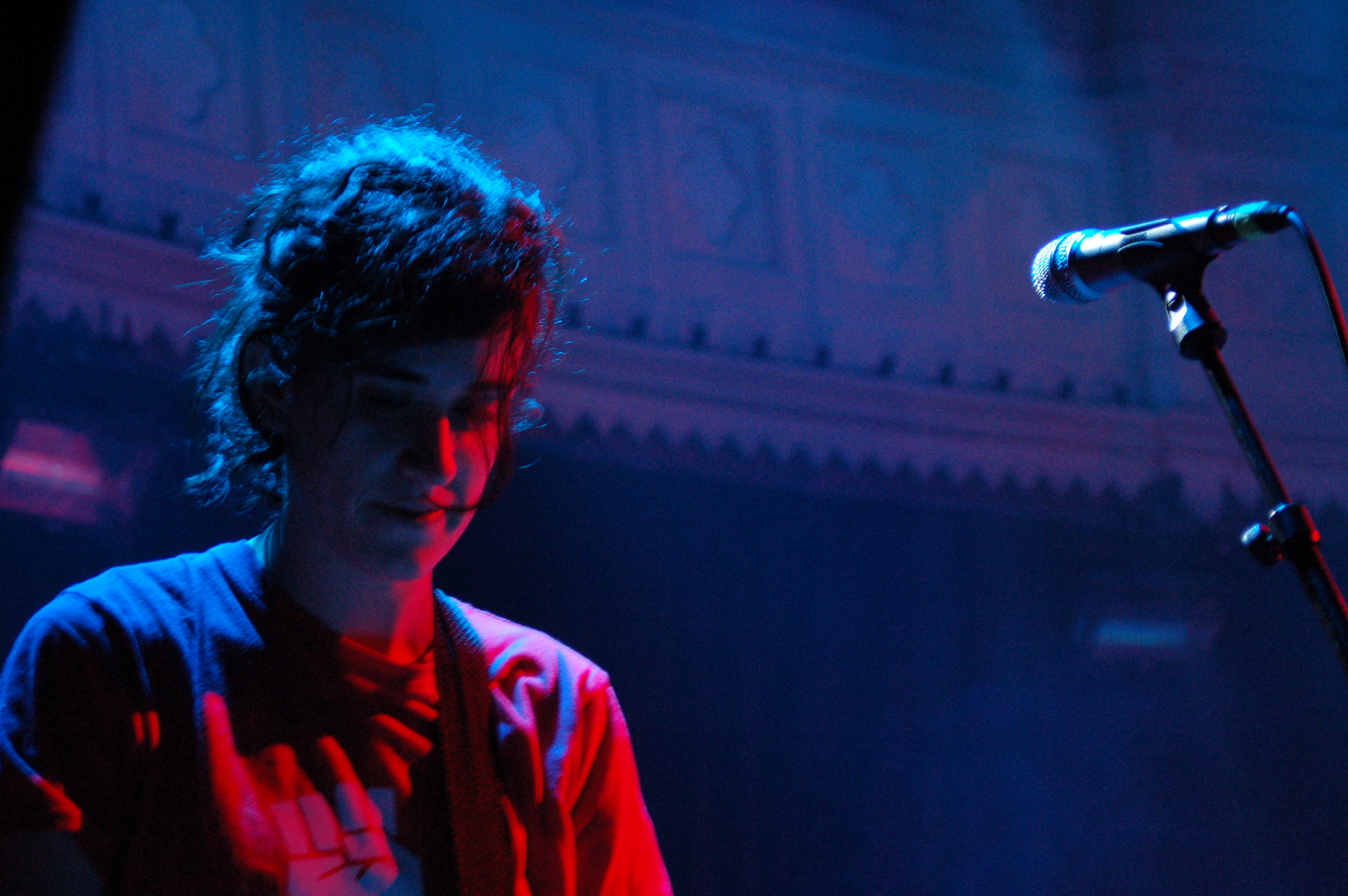
- Rezende in Paradiso, Amsterdam, 2006
- Born: Ana Maria de Rezende Versiani dos Anjos; 19 March 1983 (age 43); São Paulo, Brazil
- Spouse: Katherine Moennig (m. 2017)
- Musical career
- Genres: Indie rock; synth-pop; electroclash
- Occupations: Film director, musician
- Member of: CSS

Ana Maria de Rezende Versiani dos Anjos (born 9 March 1984) is a Brazilian film director and musician. She is the guitarist and keyboardist of the rock band CSS.

== Music career ==
Rezende is responsible for the direction of CSS's first music video in Brazil, Off The Hook, filmed at Adriano Cintra's, and Carolina Parra's house. She is also the other half of the DJ-duo MeuKu along with fellow CSS bandmate Luiza Sá.

== Personal life ==
Rezende lives in Los Angeles and is married to actress Katherine Moennig.
