= CSS (band) =

Brazilian band

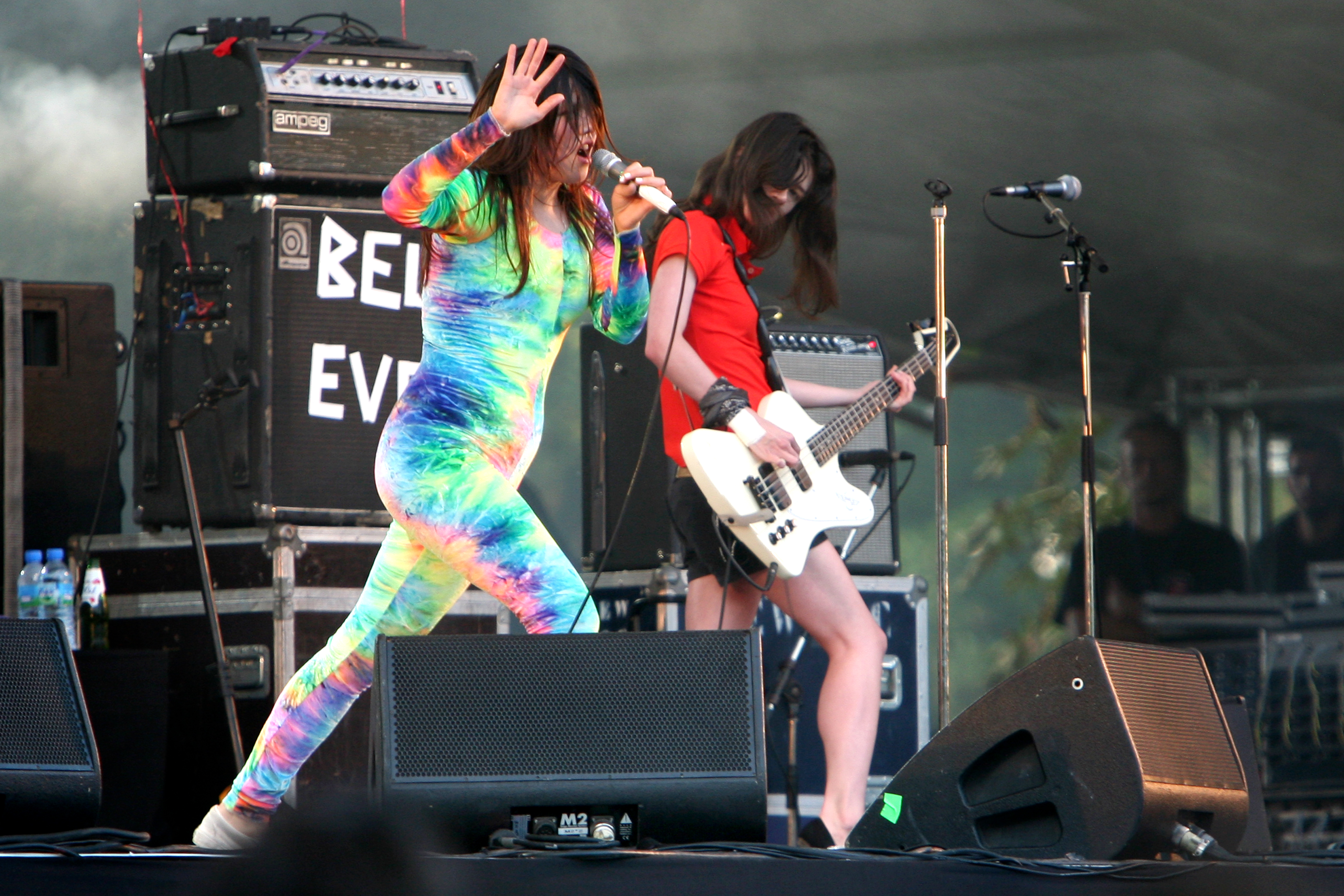
- CSS performing at the Rock en Seine 2007

Background information
- Origin: São Paulo, Brazil
- Genres: Indie rock; new wave; electronic rock; electroclash; new rave; dance-punk; indietronica
- Years active: 2003–2013; 2019–present
- Label: SQE Music
- Members: Lovefoxxx; Luiza Sá; Ana Rezende; Carolina Parra
- Past members: Maria Helena Zerba; Iracema Trevisan; Clara Ribeiro; Adriano Cintra

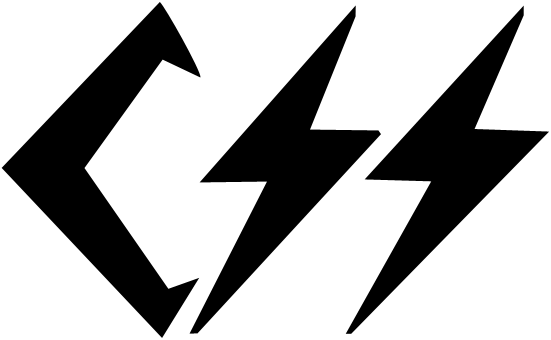
CSS logo

CSS (an initialism of Cansei de Ser Sexy) (Portuguese: [kɐ̃ˈsej d(ʒi)seʁ ˈsɛksi], English lit. "[Got] tired of being sexy") is a Brazilian rock band from São Paulo. The band was labelled as part of the explosion of the new rave scene of the late 2000s. CSS releases songs in both Portuguese and English, something which allowed them to develop a significant audience in the anglosphere in their formative years.

In 2011, Adriano Cintra, a founding member and the group's main songwriter and producer, left the band. His departure indirectly led to CSS becoming inactive between 2013 and 2019. The band reformed without Cintra in 2019. At first, the band planned to simply play one gig in São Paulo; however, the gig's success drove the members to return full-time.

== History ==
=== 2003–2006: Formation and Cansei de Ser Sexy (Brazilian album) ===
CSS formed in September 2003, consisting of a group of friends. Their name was taken from a reported quote by Beyoncé, who allegedly declared that she was "tired of being sexy".

The band first garnered fame through the internet. Some of its members, like Adriano Cintra, had been previously known in São Paulo's underground club scene, but not outside of the local alternative subculture. Others, like Lovefoxxx, were the owners of popular Fotolog and Flickr pages. Their collective band fotolog also gained popularity and their songs were frequently downloaded from Trama Virtual's website. Several songs by CSS were featured in mainstream media, for example "Meeting Paris Hilton" was featured in the Latin American broadcasting of The Simple Life, "Superafim" was used in the Brazilian version of Big Brother. Still unsigned, they released two independent EPs—Em Rotterdam Já É uma Febre in 2004, and A Onda Mortal / Uma Tarde com PJ in January 2005—and played at the TIM Festival in 2004.

In 2005, they signed with the Trama Virtual label, and in October their first album, Cansei de Ser Sexy, was released in Brazil, along with the seven-track EP CSS Suxxx, which was sold at concerts. A limited-edition version of the album had a blank CD-R included, so the buyer could burn a copy of the album to give away as a gift. In Brazil, the album has reportedly sold 5,000 copies to date, but neither the album nor the singles have charted. Two music videos were also released for "Off the Hook" and "Alala", their two big hits, and were directed by guitar player Ana Rezende, and filmed at the home of band members Carolina Parra and Cintra, where CSS recorded most of their songs.

=== 2006–2008: Cansei de Ser Sexy (international album) ===
In early 2006, CSS signed with Sub Pop to release their international debut album, Cansei de Ser Sexy. The first single was "Let's Make Love and Listen to Death From Above", released on 6 June, with an accompanying video directed by Cat Solen. In July 2006, along with DJ Diplo and funk group Bonde do Rolê, they began their first international tour. By 2007, CSS had sold as many as 60,000 copies in Europe and the United States.

They played at various festivals across Europe in the summer of 2007. The band were also scheduled to play at the American festival Lollapalooza on 4 August 2007, but were left stranded at LaGuardia Airport en route to Chicago after an overbooking error. They did arrive in time for their performance at Virgin Festival in Baltimore the next day.

CSS came to wider attention when their song "Music Is My Hot Hot Sex" was used in a worldwide television commercial by Apple Inc. for the iPod. Due to the song's exposure in the United States, it charted at number 63 on the Billboard Hot 100, becoming the highest-charting single in the United States by a Brazilian band to date in XXI century. Coincidentally, the same song had been used in a promotion for the competing Zune media player a year prior.

Several of CSS's songs feature on the soundtracks of video games. Their singles "Alala" and "Off the Hook" were featured in the video game Forza Motorsport 2. The video game FIFA 08 also features "Off the Hook", while Need for Speed: ProStreet features their song "Odio Odio Odio Sorry C". In April 2008, Iracema Trevisan left the band; Cintra replaced her on bass guitar. The band subsequently worked with a session drummer, Jon Harper of the Cooper Temple Clause.

=== 2008–2010: Donkey ===
"Rat Is Dead (Rage)", the first single to be taken from their second album, was made available as a free download from the CSS website in April 2008. The album, Donkey, was released on 21 July 2008, with first single proper, "Left Behind", having been released earlier in the month. Their song "Jager Yoga" features in the soundtrack of video game FIFA 09, and "Rat Is Dead (Rage)" appears in the video game Midnight Club: Los Angeles.

=== 2010–2013: La Liberación and Planta ===
CSS recorded tracks for their third studio album, La Liberación, while touring. They reportedly recorded a song in Spanish titled "¡Ay, Qué Horror!"

In an interview with MTV Brasil, lead singer Lovefoxxx stated that the first single of the new album would be released in May 2011. The album, also according to her, would be released in August 2011, with eleven tracks. The title would also be in Spanish.

In an April 2011 interview with Folha de S.Paulo, Adriano Cintra said that the band's third album "is not a themed album. It has influences from clubs, reggae and punk." Ana Rezende, however, stated that "we sometimes do a reggae that nobody thinks is actually reggae. But in our head is very reggae." The single "Hits Me Like a Rock" from the band's third album featured on the soundtrack of the video game FIFA 12.

==== Departure of Adriano Cintra ====
On 11 November 2011, Adriano Cintra announced that he had left CSS and declared that he did not authorize any of the band members to use his songs in any of their forthcoming concerts. He also stated that the reason behind his departure was due to attitude problems from other band members, claiming that they had let fame go to their heads. It was also reported that the band members' musical incompetence was also a factor.

In an interview with Rolling Stone Brazil, Cintra said that his bandmates' unwillingness and inability to collaborate on the recording of the band's third album led him to leave the band, a decision which the band's manager was able to revert by asking him to stay. Then, during the European tour Cintra was diagnosed with a repetitive strain injury in his hand, which made him unable to continue with the tour.

Nevertheless, as over half of the band's songs include backing tracks of Cintra playing, he expected to get paid for their use, which was agreed by the band's manager. In spite of this agreement, on the eve of the payday Cintra received an email from the band's manager informing him that the remaining members of the band thought that he did not need to be paid his share, as he did not tour and he had other forms of income. That, according to Cintra, was the last straw.

On 3 July 2012, Adriano Cintra gave an interview on Madrid, his latest musical project, where he stated regarding his CSS departure that he was fed up with his bandmates, who were frustrating to work with as they couldn't even play their own instruments.

==== Post–Cintra ====
CSS was not deterred by Cintra's departure, playing the SOS Festival in Murcia, Spain on 5 May 2012 and the Ballroom Marfa 2012 Benefit Weekend in Marfa, Texas on 27 May 2012, performing several of their old songs.

J.R. Kurtz became the band's touring drummer in 2010 with the addition of Nate Perry as touring bassist beginning in late 2011. Bassist Inge Johansson also toured with the band.

CSS' fourth album, named Planta, was released on 5 June 2013 in Japan, 10 June in the UK and 11 June in the US. The record is their first album since the departure of Cintra. The first single to be released was "Hangover".

=== 2013–2019: Hiatus ===
Following the release of Planta, CSS went on a six-year hiatus.

=== 2019–present ===
Following what was planned to be a once-off gig in their hometown of São Paulo, CSS reformed in 2019. They toured North America and the UK in 2024 to celebrate the 20th anniversary of their formation. In 2024, they performed at the annual Kilby Block Party in Utah.

== Discography ==
- Cansei de Ser Sexy (2005)
- Donkey (2008)
- La Liberación (2011)
- Planta (2013)
