= Carolina Parra =

Brazilian musician (born 1978)

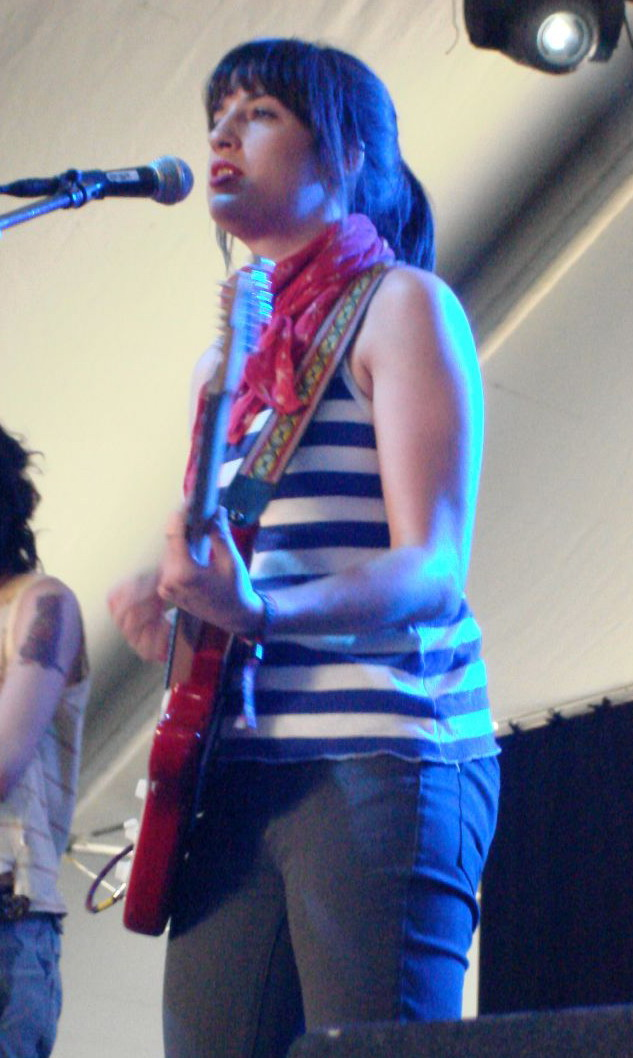
- Parra in 2007

Background information
- Born: 16 November 1978 (age 47)
- Origin: São Paulo, Brazil
- Instruments: Guitar, drums
- Member of: Cansei de Ser Sexy

Carolina Moraes Parra (born 16 November 1978, São Paulo, Brazil) is a guitarist and drummer for the Brazilian indie-electro band CSS. She joined CSS at the Tim Festival gig in 2004.

Besides CSS, she has played in many other bands including Ultrasom, Caxabaxa and Verafisher.
