= Luiza Sá =

Brazilian musician (born 1983)

Luiza da Silva e Sá-Davis
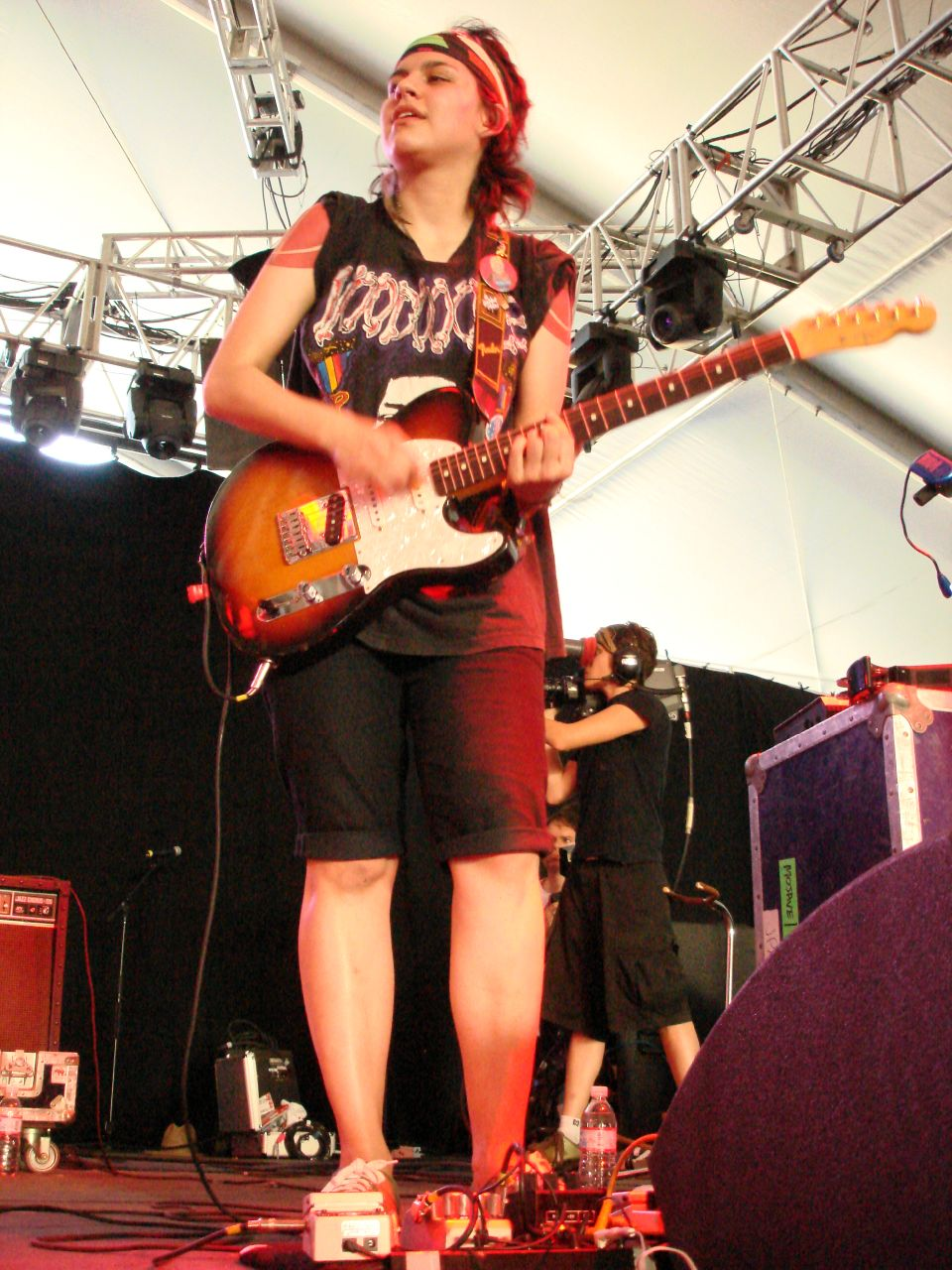
- Sá in 2007

Background information
- Born: March 29, 1983 (age 43)
- Origin: São Paulo, Brazil
- Instruments: Guitar, drums

Luiza da Silva e Sá-Davis (born March 29, 1983, in São Paulo) is one of the guitarists and drummers for the Brazilian indie-electro band Cansei de Ser Sexy.

Besides playing in the group, she studies fine art at college and is very interested in astrology. She sometimes acts as a disc jockey at São Paulo clubs along with bandmate Ana Rezende, as the duo MeuKu (which means "MyAss" in English). Her hairstyle is known as "Joana in the 80s" in São Paulo.

She is openly gay.
