= Lovefoxxx =

Brazilian singer (born 1984)

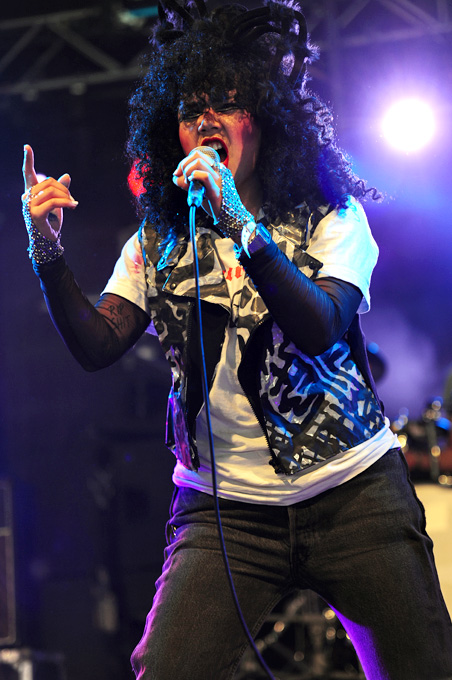
- Lovefoxxx performing in 2012

Background information
- Born: Luísa Hanae Matsushita; 25 February 1984 (age 42); Campinas, Brazil
- Origin: São Paulo, Brazil
- Genres: Indie rock; synthpop; electroclash
- Occupation: Singer
- Years active: 2003–present
- Member of: CSS

Luísa Hanae Matsushita (born 25 February 1984), known by her stage name Lovefoxxx, is a Brazilian singer known as the lead vocalist of the band CSS.

== Early life and career ==
Matsushita was born in Campinas, São Paulo, Brazil. She is of Portuguese, German and Japanese descent.

In May 2008, Lovefoxxx was on the cover of RG Vogue magazine.

In 2010, Lovefoxxx was featured on both French DJ Kavinsky's and Japanese band 80kidz's new singles, respectively known as "'Nightcall" and "Spoiled Boy". "Nightcall" was included in the soundtrack of the 2011 film Drive. She also took part in N.A.S.A.'s project The Spirit of Apollo (2009) on the track "A Volta", and was featured on Steve Aoki's album Wonderland (2011) on the song "Heartbreaker", which was released as a single in early 2012.

== Personal life ==
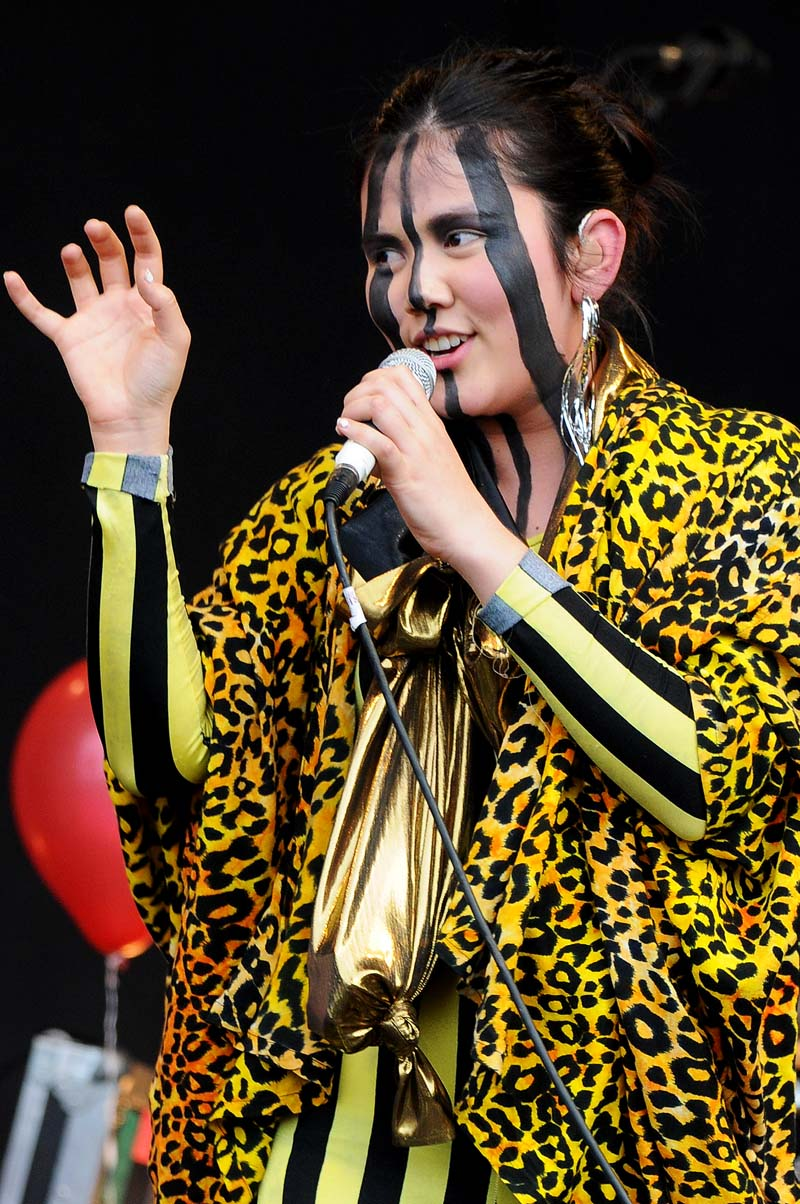
Lovefoxxx performing at the Rise Festival in 2008

In 2006, Lovefoxxx was voted No. 10 in NME's Cool List. In 2007, Lovefoxxx was voted No. 3, behind her fiancé's bandmate Jamie Reynolds, who came in second, and winner Frank Carter of Gallows.

Lovefoxxx lived in Garopaba, a beach town on the southern coast of Santa Catarina, where she built an ecohouse by hand.

=== Relationship with Simon Taylor-Davis ===
Lovefoxxx previously dated Simon Taylor-Davis of Klaxons; according to an interview with ELLE UK they started their relationship on the second day of the NME Indie Rave tour, where their bands were billed together. Taylor-Davis had said he first saw Lovefoxxx in a CSS video on television and sent her a "flirty Myspace message" before they had met. In June 2007, during the Cansei de Ser Sexy tour of North America, Lovefoxxx had Taylor-Davis' name tattooed on her right hip.

On 21 September 2007, it was revealed that the two were engaged, and Lovefoxxx later said that they would be married in the winter of that year. There was no news of an official wedding and Taylor-Davis stated they had no definite plans though they had married "in cyberspace" through Skype. In late 2010, during promotion for Klaxons' second album, it was confirmed that the two had broken up, with Taylor-Davis saying that a major change for the band was "as individuals we are all single now, whereas before we were very heavily attached in various relationships".
