= Adriano Cintra =

Brazilian multi-instrumentalist and producer (born 1974)

- Born: Adriano Ferreira Cintra; May 21, 1974 (age 52); São Paulo, Brazil
- Occupations: Musician, record producer
- Instruments: Guitar, bass, drums

Adriano Ferreira Cintra is a Brazilian musician, songwriter and record producer from São Paulo. He is a founding member of the band Cansei de Ser Sexy (CSS), for which he performed as a multi-instrumentalist, co-wrote songs and produced recordings until his departure in 2011. His other musical projects include Thee Butchers' Orchestra, Caxabaxa, Ultrasom and Madrid. He has also released solo albums and formed the duo FogoFera with singer Tiê. He later formed the duo Superafim with Clara Lima.

== Cansei de Ser Sexy ==
His most famous band was the indie-electro project Cansei de Ser Sexy. In 2003, Adriano formed the group with some friends as a joke. He wrote many of their songs, played the drums and produced the band, besides eventually playing bass, guitar and singing. Cansei de Ser Sexy was signed to indie label Sub Pop in the beginning of 2006 to release their first international album, and have toured the United Kingdom, the United States, and Canada extensively, opening for acts including Ladytron, Klaxons, Gwen Stefani and playing on the "Mojave" stage at Coachella 2007. They also headlined the Park Stage of the Glastonbury Festival of 2008.

On November 11, 2011, Cintra reported leaving the band due to disagreements with other band members. Cintra has even insinuated that other members were not so good musicians. CSS was not seriously deterred by Cintra's departure, playing the SOS Festival in Murcia, Spain on April 8, 2012, and the Ballroom Marfa 2012 Benefit Weekend in Marfa, Texas on May 27, 2012, performing several of their old songs.

In April 2012, several tracks were released from Madrid, Cintra's latest musical project. In 2014, he released the solo album Animal, which he followed up the next year with Adriano Cintra Is Dead and in 2017 with the self-released Nine Times.

== Discography ==
=== Solo albums ===
- Animal (2014).
- Adriano Cintra Is Dead (2015).
- Nine Times (2018).

=== With Cansei de Ser Sexy ===
- Cansei de Ser Sexy (2005).
- Donkey (2008).
- La Liberación (2011).

=== With Madrid ===
- Madrid (2012).

=== With Caxabaxa ===
- O Abecedário do Caxa (2017).

=== With FogoFera ===
- Eu te amo (2022).

=== With Superafim ===
- Mouth (2025, EP).
