= FKA Twigs discography =

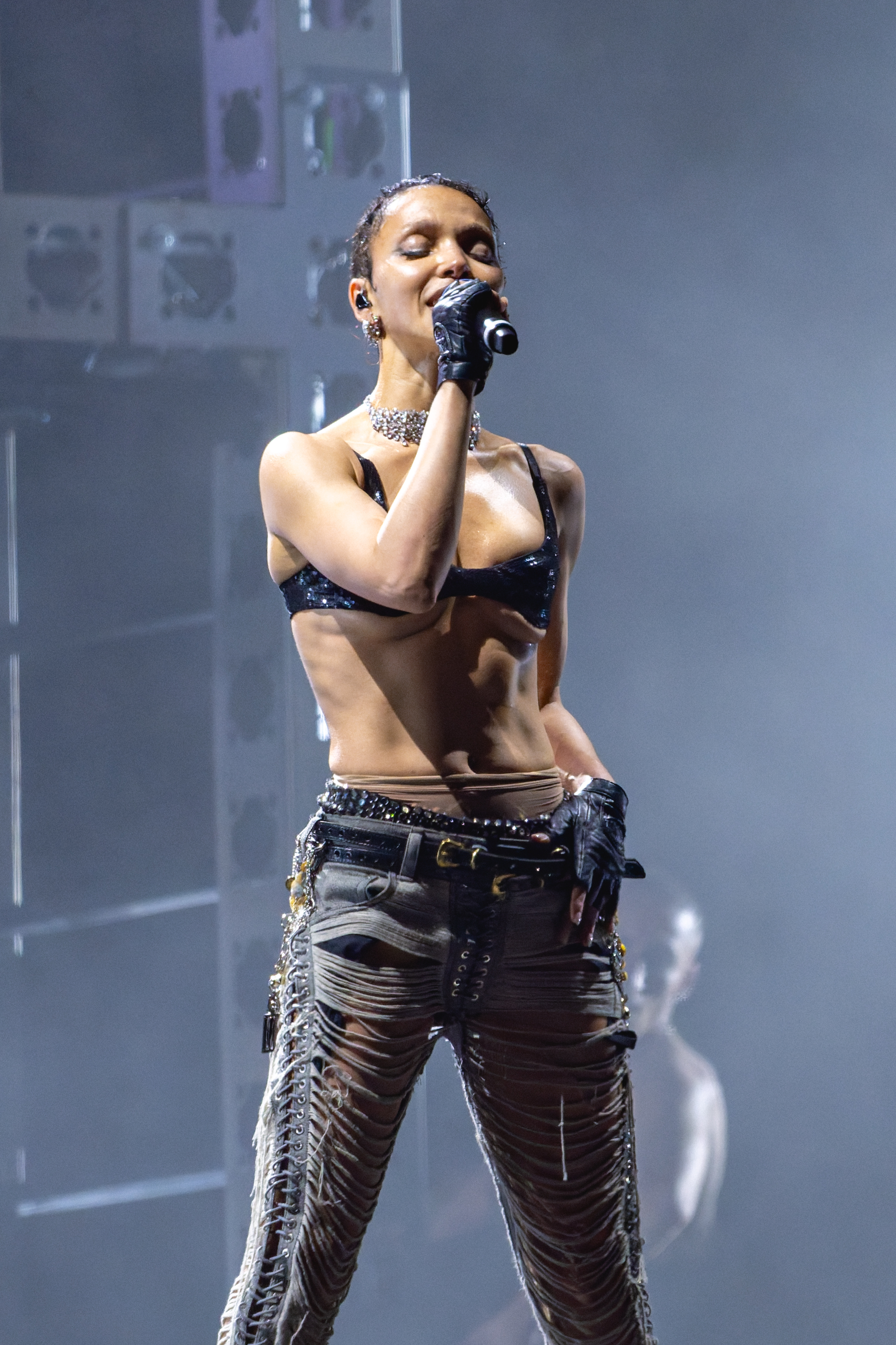
- FKA Twigs performing at Primavera Sound 2025 during the Eusexua Tour
- Studio albums: 4
- EPs: 3
- Singles: 19
- Music videos: 33
- Mixtapes: 1
- Promotional singles: 2

English singer and songwriter FKA Twigs has released four studio albums, one mixtape, three extended plays, eighteen singles (including two as a featured artist), one promotional single and eighteen music videos.

== Albums ==
=== Studio albums ===
List of studio albums, with selected chart positions and sales figures
Title	Details	Peak chart positions										Sales
Title	Details	UK	AUS	AUT	BEL (FL)	FRA	GER	IRE	NL	NZ	US	Sales
LP1	Released: 6 August 2014; Label: Young Turks; Formats: CD, LP, digital download, streaming	16	30	42	16	94	50	33	60	38	30	UK: 12,750; US: 77,000
Magdalene	Released: 8 November 2019; Label: Young Turks; Formats: CD, LP, digital download, streaming	21	22	56	23	113	78	39	55	27	54	
Eusexua	Released: 24 January 2025; Label: Young, Atlantic; Formats: CD, LP, cassette, digital download, streaming	3	59	20	16	67	37	28	32	21	24	
Eusexua Afterglow	Released: 14 November 2025; Label: Young, Atlantic; Formats: CD, LP, cassette, digital download, streaming	—	—	—	187	—	—	—	—	—	—	
"—" denotes a recording that did not chart or was not released in that territory

=== Mixtapes ===
List of mixtapes, with selected chart positions and sales figures
Title	Details	Peak chart positions								
Title	Details	UK	AUS	BEL (FL)	FRA	IRE	NZ	US	US Alt	US Dance
Caprisongs	Released: 14 January 2022; Label: Young, Atlantic; Formats: CD, LP, cassette, digital download, streaming	42	65	30	126	82	37	91	9	1

== Extended plays ==
List of extended plays, with selected chart positions and sales figures
Title	Details	Peak chart positions						Sales
Title	Details	BEL (FL)	FRA	NZ	US	US Dance	US Indie	Sales
EP1	Released: 4 December 2012; Label: Young Turks; Formats: 12-inch vinyl, digital download	—	—	—	—	11	—	
EP2	Released: 17 September 2013; Label: Young Turks; Formats: 12-inch vinyl, digital download	—	—	—	— (Note: "EP2" did not enter the Billboard 200, but peaked at number 13 on the Heatseekers Albums chart.)	5	—	
M3LL155X	Released: 13 August 2015; Label: Young Turks; Formats: 12-inch vinyl, digital download	193	184	30	63	2	5	US: 7,000
"—" denotes a recording that did not chart or was not released in that territory

== Singles ==
=== As lead artist ===
List of singles, with selected chart positions, showing year released and album name
Title	Year	Peak chart positions						Certifications	Album
Title	Year	UK	UK Indie	BEL (FL) Tip	CAN	NZ Hot	US Dance/ Elect.	Certifications	Album
"FKA x inc." (with inc.)	2014	—	—	—	—	—	—		Non-album single
"Two Weeks"	2014	200	9	54	—	—	— (Note: "Two Weeks" did not enter the Dance/Electronic Songs chart, but peaked at number 42 on the Dance/Electronic Digital Song Sales chart.)	BPI: Silver; RIAA: Gold	LP1
"Pendulum"	2014	—	—	91	—	—	—		LP1
"Video Girl"	2014	—	—	—	—	—	—		LP1
"In Time"	2015	—	—	—	—	—	—		M3LL155X
"Good to Love"	2016	—	—	—	—	—	—		Non-album single
"Cellophane"	2019	—	46	—	—	30	—		Magdalene
"Holy Terrain" (featuring Future)	2019	—	—	—	—	—	18		Magdalene
"Home with You"	2019	—	—	—	—	—	32		Magdalene
"Sad Day"	2019	—	—	—	—	30	16		Magdalene
"Don't Judge Me" (with Headie One and Fred Again)	2021	—	—	—	—	—	23		Non-album single
"Measure of a Man" (featuring Central Cee)	2021	—	—	—	—	—	—		The King's Man soundtrack
"Tears in the Club" (featuring the Weeknd)	2021	—	—	—	79	12	—		Caprisongs
"Killer"	2022	—	—	—	—	31	24		Non-album singles
"Talk to Me" (with Two Shell)	2024	—	—	—	—	—	—		Non-album singles
"Eusexua"	2024	—	—	—	—	12	17		Eusexua (Note: "Perfectly" only appears on the digital reissue of Eusexua.)
"Perfect Stranger"	2024	—	—	—	—	—	34		Eusexua
"Drums of Death" (with Koreless)	2024	—	—	—	—	—	40		Eusexua
"Childlike Things" (with North West)	2025	—	—	—	—	19	—		Eusexua
"Perfectly"	2025	—	—	—	—	—	—		Eusexua
"Cheap Hotel"	2025	—	—	—	—	—	—		Eusexua Afterglow
"Predictable Girl"	2025	—	—	—	—	—	—		Eusexua Afterglow
"Hard"	2025	—	—	—	—	—	—		Eusexua Afterglow
"Love Crimes"	2025	—	—	—	—	—	—		Eusexua Afterglow
"On Your Mind" (featuring Lil Yachty)	2026	—	—	—	—	33	—		TBA
"—" denotes a recording that did not chart.

=== As featured artist ===
List of featured singles, with selected chart positions, showing year released and album name
Title	Year	Peak chart positions										Certifications	Album
Title	Year	UK	AUS	CAN	GER	IRE	NZ Hot	SCO	SWE	US Bub.	US R&B	Certifications	Album
"Ego Death" (Ty Dolla $ign featuring Kanye West, FKA Twigs and Skrillex)	2020	34	68	65	92	41	6	54	54	7	10	BPI: Silver; RMNZ: Gold	Featuring Ty Dolla $ign
"Sum Bout U" (645AR featuring FKA Twigs)	2020	—	—	—	—	—	—	—	—	—	—		Non-album single
"Viscus" (Oklou featuring FKA Twigs)	2025	—	—	—	—	—	—	—	—	—	—		Choke Enough (Deluxe)
"—" denotes a recording that did not chart.

=== Promotional singles ===
List of promotional singles, with selected chart positions, showing year released and album name
Title	Year	Peak chart position		Album
Title	Year	NZ Hot	US Dance/ Elect.	Album
"Water Me"	2013	—	—	EP2
"Jealousy" (featuring Rema)	2022	40	13	Caprisongs
"—" denotes a recording that did not chart.

== Guest appearances ==
List of non-single guest appearances, with other performing artists
Title	Year	Other artist(s)	Album
"Fukk Sleep"	2018	ASAP Rocky	Testing
"Stay with Me" (Live)	2019	none	BBC Radio 1's Live Lounge: The Collection
"Alucinao"	2020	Against All Logic, Estado Unido	Illusions of Shameless Abundance
"Judge Me" (Interlude)	2020	Headie One, Fred Again	Gang
"If You're Too Shy (Let Me Know)"	2020	The 1975	Notes on a Conditional Form
"What Should I Say"	2020	The 1975	Notes on a Conditional Form
"Strangers"	2020	Slingbaum, Oumou Sangaré, Nick Hakim	Slingbaum One
"Bliss"	2022	Yung Lean	Stardust
"Fly Nitë"	2025	Yeat	Dangerous Summer
"Caroline"	2025	Venera	Exinfinite

== Other charted songs ==
List of other charted songs, with selected chart positions, showing year released and album name
Title	Year	Peak chart positions							Album
Title	Year	UK	CAN	NZ Hot	SWI	US Bub.	US R&B/HH Bub.	US Dance/ Elect.	Album
"Fukk Sleep" (ASAP Rocky featuring FKA Twigs)	2018	99	89	—	65	4	2	—	Testing
"Thousand Eyes"	2019	—	—	—	—	—	—	31	Magdalene
"Mary Magdalene"	2019	—	—	—	—	—	—	32	Magdalene
"Fallen Alien"	2019	—	—	—	—	—	—	36	Magdalene
"Mirrored Heart"	2019	—	—	—	—	—	—	37	Magdalene
"Ride the Dragon"	2022	—	—	—	—	—	—	18	Caprisongs
"Honda" (featuring Pa Salieu)	2022	—	—	—	—	—	—	28	Caprisongs
"Meta Angel"	2022	—	—	—	—	—	—	25	Caprisongs
"Oh My Love"	2022	—	—	—	—	—	—	23	Caprisongs
"Pamplemousse"	2022	—	—	—	—	—	—	37	Caprisongs
"Lightbeamers"	2022	—	—	—	—	—	—	36	Caprisongs
"Papi Bones" (featuring Shygirl)	2022	—	—	—	—	—	—	32	Caprisongs
"Which Way" (featuring Dystopia)	2022	—	—	—	—	—	—	42	Caprisongs
"Careless" (featuring Daniel Caesar)	2022	—	—	—	—	—	—	31	Caprisongs
"Minds of Men"	2022	—	—	—	—	—	—	44	Caprisongs
"Darjeeling" (featuring Jorja Smith and Unknown T)	2022	—	—	—	—	—	—	38	Caprisongs
"Girl Feels Good"	2025	—	—	23	—	—	—	—	Eusexua
"Sticky"	2025	—	—	31	—	—	—	—	Eusexua
"Striptease"	2025	—	—	28	—	—	—	—	Eusexua
"—" denotes a recording that did not chart.

== Music videos ==
=== As artist ===
List of music videos, showing year released and directors
Title	Year	Director(s)	Ref.
"Hide"	2012	Grace Ladoja and FKA Twigs	
"Ache"	2012	Grace Ladoja and FKA Twigs	
"Breathe"	2012	Grace Ladoja and FKA Twigs	
"Weak Spot"	2012	Grace Ladoja and FKA Twigs	
"How's That"	2013	Jesse Kanda	
"Water Me"	2013	Jesse Kanda	
"Papi Pacify"	2013	Tom Beard and FKA Twigs	
"FKA x inc." (with inc.)	2014	Nick Walker and FKA Twigs	
"tw-Ache"	2014	Tom Beard and FKA Twigs	
"Two Weeks"	2014	Nabil	
"Video Girl"	2014	Kahlil Joseph	
"Pendulum"	2015	FKA Twigs	
"Glass & Patron"	2015	FKA Twigs	
"M3LL155X"	2015	FKA Twigs	
"Good to Love"	2016	FKA Twigs and Imma	
"Fukk Sleep" (ASAP Rocky featuring FKA Twigs)	2018	Diana Kunst	
"Cellophane"	2019	Andrew Thomas Huang	
"Holy Terrain" (featuring Future)	2019	FKA Twigs and Nick Walker	
"Home with You"	2019	FKA Twigs	
"Sad Day"	2020	Hiro Murai	
"Don't Judge Me" (with Headie One and Fred Again)	2021	Emmanuel Adjei and FKA Twigs	
"Measure of a Man" (featuring Central Cee)	2021	Diana Kunst	
"Tears in the Club" (featuring the Weeknd)	2021	Amber Grace Johnson	
"Ride the Dragon"	2022	Aidan Zamiri	
"Meta Angel"	2022	Aidan Zamiri	
"Jealousy" (featuring Rema)	2022	Aidan Zamiri	
"Darjeeling" (featuring Jorja Smith and Unknown T)	2022	Aidan Zamiri	
"Bliss" (Yung Lean featuring FKA Twigs)	2022	Aidan Zamiri	
"Papi Bones" (featuring Shygirl)	2022	Aidan Zamiri	
"Oh My Love"	2022	Aidan Zamiri	
"Honda" (featuring Pa Salieu)	2022	Aidan Zamiri	
"Which Way" (featuring Dystopia)	2022	Aidan Zamiri	
"Thank You Song"	2022	Aidan Zamiri	
"Killer"	2022	Yoann Lemoine	
"Pamplemousse"	2022	Aidan Zamiri and Yuma Burgess	
"Eusexua"	2024	Jordan Hemingway	
"Perfect Stranger"	2024	Jordan Hemingway	
"Striptease"	2025	Jordan Hemingway	
"Cheap Hotel"	2025	Jordan Hemingway	
"Predictable Girl"	2025	Jordan Hemingway	
"Hard"	2025	Jordan Hemingway	
"Love Crimes"	2025	Jordan Hemingway	

=== As director ===
List of music videos directed for other artist(s), showing year released
Title	Year	Ref.
"Ouch Ouch" (Lucki Eck$ featuring FKA twigs)	2014	
"White Picket Fence" (Koreless)	2021	
