= Body High Tour =

2026 concert tour by FKA Twigs

- Tour by FKA Twigs
- Promotional poster
- Location: Europe; North America
- Associated album: Eusexua; Eusexua Afterglow
- Start date: 14 March 2026
- End date: 12 June 2026
- No. of shows: 21
- Supporting acts: Brutalismus 3000; Eartheater; Tokischa; Izzy Spears; Yves Tumor

FKA Twigs concert chronology
- Eusexua Tour (2025); Body High Tour (2026)

Body High Tour was the fourth concert tour by the English singer FKA Twigs in support of her 2025 studio albums, Eusexua and Eusexua Afterglow. It commenced on 14 March 2026, in Miami, with shows across Europe and North America, and concluded in Berlin on 12 June 2026, comprising 21 shows. Brutalismus 3000, Eartheater, Izzy Spears, Tokischa, and Yves Tumor served as the opening acts.

== Background ==
FKA Twigs embarked in 2025 on the Eusexua Tour in support of her third studio album, Eusexua (2025), which traversed postponements and cancellations of multiple dates across North America and Europe due to logistical and production issues, including a festival appearance at Coachella 2025. During an interview with The Hollywood Reporter, Twigs recalled the experience as "catastrophic" and described it as "one of the most painful times of [her] career." As a result, the cancelled portion of the tour forced her to move nine members of her dance team into her home after their plans were disrupted, and it also led her to work on a new version of the show and to "make a lot of music, hunker down, and hold people close to [her]."

In August 2025, during a festival performance as part of the Eusexua Tour, Twigs stated that she was releasing another album soon, and on 26 September 2025, it was officially announced as Eusexua: Afterglow, along with an album trailer. The album was released on 14 November 2025, supported by the singles "Cheap Hotel", "Predictable Girl", "Hard", and the concurrent "Love Crimes", whose music video was released on 1 December announcing the new tour for 2026. The Body High Tour was held in several theatres and arenas, making it Twigs' biggest headlining tour to date. Regarding the staging production, Twigs also hinted during her interview with The Hollywood Reporter that she "learnt a lot" after the Eusexua Tour, adding that "Now I know about buses and freighting, how many days it takes to get from New York to Mexico in a truck, and how to get through customs."

== Set list ==
The set list below is adapted from the 14 March 2026 show in Miami. It does not represent all shows.

Act I:

1. "Mirrored Heart"
2. "Meta Angel"
3. "Bluebird"
4. "Figure 8"
5. "Drums of Death"

Act II:

1. "Cheap Hotel (remix)/Oh My Love/Sum Bout U" (interlude)
2. "Hard/Lights On"
3. "Honda"
4. "Papi Bones"
5. "Tears in the Club"
6. "Sushi"

Act III:

1. "Eusexua"
2. "Perfectly"
3. "Love Crimes"
4. "Weak Spot/Room of Fools"
5. "Techno Ballet"

Act IV:

1. "Sticky"
2. "Stereo Boy"
3. "Phallic By Nature"
4. "Schadenfreude"

Act V:

1. "Water Me/Coital Dreamer"
2. "Home with You"
3. "Fallen Alien"
4. "Mary Magdalene"
5. "Thousand Eyes" (interlude)

Act VI:

1. "Two Weeks"
2. "Striptease"
3. "Cellophane"
4. "Lonely but Exciting Road" (outro)

== Tour dates ==
List of 2026 concerts
Date (2026)	City	Country	Venue	Supporting acts
14 March	Miami	United States	Factory Town	Eartheater
16 March	Cumberland (Note: Labelled as Atlanta in promotion material.)	United States	Coca-Cola Roxy	Eartheater
18 March	Washington, D.C.	United States	The Anthem	Tokischa
21 March	New York City	United States	Madison Square Garden	Tokischa
22 March	Boston	United States	MGM Music Hall at Fenway	Tokischa
24 March	Toronto	Canada	Coca-Cola Coliseum	Tokischa
26 March	Chicago	United States	Wintrust Arena	Tokischa
27 March	Minneapolis	United States	The Armory	Tokischa
30 March	Denver	United States	Fillmore Auditorium	Brutalismus 3000
2 April	Seattle	United States	WaMu Theater	Brutalismus 3000
3 April	Vancouver	Canada	Thunderbird Sports Centre	Brutalismus 3000
4 April	Portland	United States	Theater of the Clouds	Brutalismus 3000
7 April	San Francisco	United States	Bill Graham Civic Auditorium	Eartheater
12 April (Note: The concerts on 12 and 19 April 2026, at the Empire Polo Club in Indio are part of the Coachella Valley Music and Arts Festival.)	Indio	United States	Empire Polo Club	—N/a
19 April	Indio	United States	Empire Polo Club	—N/a
23 April	Mexico City	Mexico	Pepsi Center WTC	Eartheater
4 June	Copenhagen	Denmark	Royal Arena	Yves Tumor
6 June	Amsterdam	Netherlands	Ziggo Dome	Yves Tumor
8 June	Paris	France	Adidas Arena	Yves Tumor
10 June	London	England	The O_{2} Arena	Yves Tumor
12 June	Berlin	Germany	Velodrom	Yves Tumor

== Personnel ==
=== Creative and production ===
- Show directors: FKA twigs, Jordan Hemingway, Theo Adams
- Stage, production and lighting design: Tobias Rylander
- Head choreographer: Blake Wood
- Choreographer: Damien Jalet

Opera Chapter

- Choreographed and directed by Damien Jalet
- Video content Opera section Jordan Hemingway and Damien Jalet
- Choreographers: Malou Linders, James Vu Anh Pham
- Choreographer Assistant: Zaccary Milne
- Creative consultant: Leslie Travers
- Associate director to Theo Adams: Jordan Hunt

=== Performers ===
- Dance captain: James Vu Anh Pham
- Dancers: Edson Soares Da Silva Junior, Jaxon Willard, Max Cookward, Emiliano Jimenez, Paul-Donald Boni, Maya Luna Ruiz Casper, JuJu
- Musicians: Timmaz Zolleyn ("Tic"), Luis Angel Aponte Jr ("Lu 2k")
- Rapper: Izzy Spears

=== Tour crew ===
- Tour direction: Riverjuke
- Tour manager: Adam Williams
- Production manager: Alex Tidesjo
- Road manager: Omar Khan
- Production coordinator: Annie Hargrave
- Stage manager: Patrick Thomas

=== Technical crew ===
- Musical director: Matt Robertson
- FOH: Mike Njuguna
- MON: Paul Egan
- Playback: Owen McGarry
- Backline: Nathan Robinson
- Audio tech: Oliver Barnett
- Lighting directors: Alex Pickard, Aaron Wade
- Lighting techs: Patrick Sieg, Drew Mayer, Douglas Eder, Michael Rinehart, Malik Leverette
- Video tech: Kenneth Patterson

=== Additional crew ===
- Carpenters: Lance Weaver, Kyle Smith
- Merch: Ashley Meyer
- VIP manager: Morgan Moreno
- Wardrobe: Toni Grant, Jace May Dodson
- Hair: Louis Souvestre
- Make-up: Catalina Sartor

=== Transport ===
- Bus drivers: Eric Scheumann, Michael Sumner, Jeremy Zamanksi, Pat Keats, Jonathan Swanson, Michaelee Morganelli, Joe Brinkman

=== Fashion ===
- Designers: GUVANCH - Guvanch Agajumayev, Nasir Mazhar
- Designer assistants: Jonty Knight, Samantha Butters, Ashley NG, Xaria, Jimetrious Uruo, Erik Acheson, Julian Gomez, Tendai Chafa-Agoha, Kaedyn Mamanta, Rujia Zhang, William Gluck
- Stylist: Emily Costantino
- Assistant stylists: Dalia Glazman, Sara Lukaszewski, Willa Shwabsky, Hannah Sheiber, Mina Parsons, Sierra Bivens, Carolina Mourinho, Binkie Reevey, Ranxelle Levin Soria (Roxie)

=== Wardrobe and tailoring ===
- Tailoring: Jullian Gomez, Doris McMillan
- Lead wardrobe coordinator & Twigs' Dresser: Jace May Dobson
- Dancer wardrobe coordinator: Toni Scott Grant
