= Perfectly =

Single by FKA Twigs

from the album Eusexua
- Released: 9 July 2025
- Genre: Dance-pop; pop
- Length: 3:51
- Label: Young; Atlantic
- Songwriters: FKA Twigs; Amy Wadge; Ethan P. Flynn; Lewis Roberts; Xquisite Korpse
- Producers: FKA Twigs; Maxx Morando; Xquisite Korpse; Koreless

FKA Twigs singles chronology
"Childlike Things" (2025)	"Perfectly" (2025)	"Cheap Hotel" (2025)

Music video
- "Perfectly" on YouTube

"Perfectly" is a song by English singer FKA Twigs. It was released as a single through Young and Atlantic Records on 9 July 2025. It was included on a digital reissue of her third studio album, Eusexua. The track was first previewed live during the Eusexua Tour, including Primavera in Barcelona and LadyLand in New York City.

Described as an uptempo, club-ready dance-pop song that blends experimental production with a lighter, romantic tone, it was promoted with cover art and snippets shared on social media and arrived alongside a Jordan Hemingway–directed music video featuring twigs and her Eusexua community, reflecting the project's themes of physicality, vulnerability, and freedom.

== Background ==
Following the release of her third studio album, Eusexua (2025), "Perfectly" was first previewed live during the Eusexua tour, including performances at Primavera in Barcelona and LadyLand in New York City.

== Promotion ==
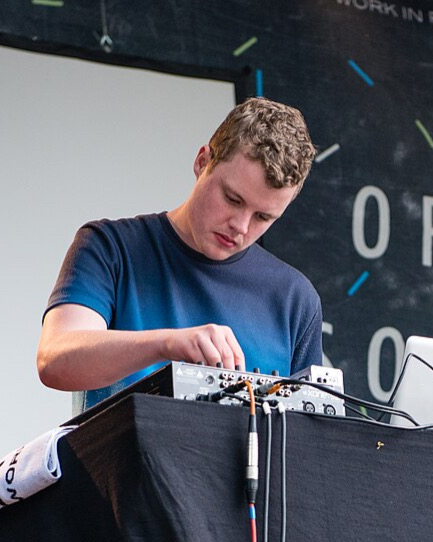
Welsh DJ Koreless co-produced "Perfectly" with Twigs.

On her social media, twigs revealed the single's cover art, writing, "and so the offerings begin again... if Eusexua was the tip of the tongue, 'Perfectly' is the oesophagus". In her Instagram story, she previewed a 15-second snippet of the track, which she had already been performing live, featuring the lyric, "Another day, leave it all to another day". On release, twigs shared "Perfectly" alongside a Jordan Hemingway–directed music video. Co-produced by twigs with Koreless and Xquisite Korpse, the video emphasized the community surrounding the album and reflected its themes of physicality, vulnerability, and freedom.

== Composition ==
"Perfectly" is described as a "high-tempo dance-pop track" that highlights twigs' experimental approach to production, with darkened dance-pop elements with a lighter and romantic tone. As also noted as a clubby, uptempo pop track with a vocal delivery reminiscent of PinkPantheress, Uproxx observed its "club-ready" quality, quoting lyrics from the opening verse — "Another day, leave it all to another day / Leave it all to another day, another me / And when I'm done, they'll say I did it perfectly". Rolling Stone described the song as a "hopeful track" driven by a propulsive beat, underlining twigs' ability to merge lyrical intimacy with energetic, experimental pop textures.

== Music video ==
The music video for "Perfectly," directed by Jordan Hemingway, was released alongside the song's release. Featuring twigs and her Eusexua community dancing freely in a white studio, it celebrates the community as well as the album's core themes of physicality, vulnerability, and freedom. Rolling Stone characterized the clip as "dynamic", depicting twigs dancing in unison with a group of performers, visually amplifying the track's celebratory energy.

== Personnel ==
Credits were adapted from Tidal.

- FKA Twigs – producer, vocals, writer
- Koreless – producer
- Xquisite Korpse – producer, writer
- Batu – additional production
- Amy Wadge – writer
- Ethan P. Flynn – writer
- Lewis Roberts – writer
- Brad Lauchert – engineer
- Jonny Leslie – recording engineer
- Jon Castelli – mixer
- Dale Becker – masterer
- Katie Harvey – assistant mastering engineer
- Noah McCorkle – assistant mastering engineer
