= Eusexua Afterglow =

2025 studio album by FKA Twigs

- Standard cover

Studio album by FKA Twigs
- Released: 14 November 2025
- Genres: Dance; trip hop; electronica; avant-garde
- Length: 40:11
- Labels: Young; Atlantic
- Producers: Bapari; Manni Dee; Sam Every-Baker; FKA Twigs; Joy Henson; Illangelo; Kelvin Krash; LCN; Petra Levitt; Lilbubblegum; Doc McKinney; Mechatok; Mike Q; Yves Rothman; RougeHotel; Tic

FKA Twigs chronology
Eusexua (2025)	Eusexua Afterglow (2025)

Alternative cover

Singles from Eusexua Afterglow
- 1. "Cheap Hotel" Released: 26 September 2025; 2. "Predictable Girl" Released: 11 November 2025; 3. "Hard" Released: 17 November 2025; 4. "Love Crimes" Released: 1 December 2025

Eusexua Afterglow (stylised as EUSEXUA Afterglow) is the fourth studio album by the English singer FKA Twigs. Released on 14 November 2025 through Young and Atlantic Records, the album spawned four singles: "Cheap Hotel", "Predictable Girl", "Hard" and "Love Crimes". Initially conceived as a deluxe edition of Eusexua (2025), the album eventually evolved to a standalone work as a sequel to Twigs' previous album.

== Background and release ==
In August 2025, during a festival performance as part of the promotion of her third album, Eusexua (2025), Twigs stated that she was releasing another album soon, titled Eusexua Afterglow. Pitchfork confirmed it to be "not a deluxe version, but rather a whole new album". The album was initially conceived as a deluxe edition of FKA Twigs's previous album, but it later evolved into a new project described as a sequel and containing a standalone track listing. "Perfectly", released on 16 July 2025, was originally intended to serve as the lead single from the deluxe edition of the album, but was ultimately excluded from the final tracklist. The track "Margarita", now titled "Sushi", was teased in snippets at several of Barnett's performances.

FKA Twigs officially announced Eusexua Afterglow on 26 September 2025, along with an album trailer, which teased the track "Slushy". According to a press release, FKA Twigs created the word "Eusexua" to "describe the nothingness and focus one feels in the moments leading up to an orgasm", and the album "expands on the feelings that come after experiencing Eusexua, transmuting them into a soundtrack for the hours after the rave and extending that high into the afters". The lead single "Cheap Hotel" was released on the same date, and was accompanied by a seven-minute music video directed by Jordan Hemingway, which stars FKA Twigs alongside Shannon and Shannade Clermont. The album's second single, "Predictable Girl" was released on 11 November 2025. It was accompanied by a music video starring Barnett and Shivawn Joubert, directed by Jordan Hemingway.

Eusexua Afterglow was released on 14 November 2025 through Young and Atlantic Records. The music video for the track "Hard", directed by Jordan Hemingway, was released on the same day. The music video for the track "Love Crimes", directed by Jordan Hemingway, was released on 1 December 2025.

To support the album, FKA Twigs embarked on the Body High Tour in North America and Europe from March to June 2026.

== Critical reception ==
Professional ratings
Aggregate scores
Source	Rating
AnyDecentMusic?	7.5/10
Metacritic	77/100
Review scores
Source	Rating
AllMusic	4/5 stars
Clash	8/10
Financial Times	3/5 stars
Hot Press	8/10
NME	4/5 stars
Pitchfork	7.4/10
Rolling Stone	3.5/5 stars
The Skinny	4/5 stars
Slant Magazine	4/5 stars
Sputnikmusic	3.6/5

Upon release, Eusexua Afterglow received positive reviews from music critics. According to the review aggregator Metacritic, Eusexua Afterglow received "generally favorable reviews" based on a weighted average score of 77 out of 100 from 10 critic scores.

== Track listing ==
All lyrics are written by FKA Twigs.

Eusexua Afterglow track listing
No.	Title	Music	Producer(s)	Length
1.	"Love Crimes"	Balzacc30; FKA Twigs; RougeHotel; Sid Spada; Tyrone Griffin Jr.	FKA Twigs; Manni Dee; RougeHotel; Hezen^{[a]}	2:41
2.	"Slushy"	Chris Thomas; Finn Frederick Wigan; FKA Twigs; Manni Dee; RougeHotel	FKA Twigs; Dee; Wigan^{[a]}; Kurisu^{[a]}	3:34
3.	"Wild and Alone" (featuring PinkPantheress)	FKA Twigs; Jordan Asher Cruz; Rick Nowels; Victoria Walker	Batu; FKA Twigs; LCN; Jonny Leslie^{[a]}; Dee^{[a]}; Stuart Price^{[a]}	4:09
4.	"Hard"	FKA Twigs; Dee; Mechatok; Robert Graff	FKA Twigs; Mechatok; Dee^{[a]}	3:34
5.	"Cheap Hotel"	FKA Twigs; Joy Henson; Lilbubblegum; Dee; Petra Levitt	FKA Twigs; Henson; Dee; Levitt; Lilbubblegum	3:30
6.	"Touch a Girl"	FKA Twigs; Kelvin Magnusen; Dee	FKA Twigs; Kelvin Krash; Dee; Henson^{[a]}; Levitt^{[a]}	3:00
7.	"Predictable Girl"	FKA Twigs; Henson; Dee; Levitt; James Napier; Sam Every-Baker; Timmaz Zolleyn	FKA Twigs; Dee; Tic; Every-Baker; RougeHotel; Mechatok^{[a]}; Oli XL^{[a]}	2:26
8.	"Sushi"	Arielle Baptiste; FKA Twigs; Dee; Robert Cook; Yves Rothman	Bapari; FKA Twigs; Dee; Mike Q; Rothman; CityTronix^{[a]}; Leslie^{[a]}; Liza Kaye^{[a]}	5:23
9.	"Piece of Mine"	FKA Twigs; Henson; Lilbubblegum; Dee; Levitt; Every-Baker	FKA Twigs; Henson; Lilbubblegum; Dee; Levitt; Every-Baker^{[c]}; Leslie^{[a]}	3:15
10.	"Lost All My Friends"	Baptiste; Daniel Harle; FKA Twigs; Dee	Bapari; Dee; Leslie^{[c]}; Mechatok^{[a]}	3:45
11.	"Stereo Boy"	Carlo Montagnese; FKA Twigs; Martin McKinney	Doc McKinney; Dokii; FKA Twigs; Illangelo	4:52
Total length:				40:11

=== Notes ===
- ^{^[c]} signifies a co-producer
- ^{^[a]} signifies an additional producer

== Personnel ==
Credits adapted from Tidal.

- FKA Twigs – vocals
- Sam Every-Baker – engineering (all tracks), mixing (tracks 7–9); bass, keyboards, synthesizer (9)
- Matt Colton – mastering
- Dan Harfield – mastering assistance (1–6, 8–11)
- Mendy Stein – mixing assistance (1–3, 5, 6, 8, 10, 11)
- Eric J Dubowsky – mixing (1–3, 5, 6, 10, 11)
- Balzacc30 – additional vocals (1)
- Stuart Price – bass, keyboards (3)
- Nickie Jon Pabón – vocal mixing (3)
- PinkPantheress – vocals (3)
- Dayzel TheMachine – mixing (4)
- Tic – background vocals, guitar (7)
- Precious – background vocals (8)
- Enantios Dromos – spoken voice (9)
- Danny Harle – additional arrangement (10)
- Illangelo – mixing, synthesizer (11)
- Doc McKinney – guitar (11)

== Charts ==
Chart performance for Eusexua Afterglow
Chart (2025–2026)	Peak position
Belgian Albums (Ultratop Flanders)	187
Croatian International Albums (HDU)	40
Portuguese Albums (AFP)	101
Scottish Albums (Official Charts)	45
UK Albums Sales (OCC)	36
UK Dance Albums (Official Charts)	2
UK Independent Albums (Official Charts)	7
US Top Album Sales (Billboard)	42
US Top Dance Albums (Billboard)	10
