= Magdalene Tour =

2019 concert tour by FKA Twigs

- Tour by FKA Twigs
- Official poster for Magdalene Tour, showing the nine dates of Leg 4 – North America
- Associated album: Magdalene
- Start date: May 7, 2019
- End date: December 3, 2019
- Legs: 5
- No. of shows: 19 in North America; 10 in Europe; 2 in Oceania; 31 total

FKA Twigs concert chronology
- Magdalene Tour (2019); Eusexua Tour (2025)

Magdalene Tour (stylised in all caps) is the second concert tour by English singer and songwriter FKA Twigs. It promoted her second studio album Magdalene (2019), and began at the Palace Theater in Los Angeles, on May 7, 2019.

== Sample setlist ==
The setlist is from November 6, 2019, concert in Oakland. It does not represent all concerts of the tour.

1. "Tap Dance"
2. "Hide"
3. "Water Me"
4. "Pendulum"
5. "Figure 8" / "Video Girl"
6. "Thousand Eyes"
7. "Mary Magdalene"
8. "Home With You"
9. "Sad Day"
10. "Holy Terrain"
11. "Daybed"
12. "Mirrored Heart"
13. "Papi Pacify"
14. "Lights On"
15. "Two Weeks"
16. "Cellophane"

== Tour dates ==
List of concerts, showing date, city, country, venue, and opening act
Date	City	Country	Venue	Opening Act
North America
May 7, 2019	Los Angeles	United States	Palace Theater	
May 8, 2019	Los Angeles	United States	Palace Theater	
May 11, 2019	New York City	United States	Park Avenue Armory	
May 12, 2019	New York City	United States	Park Avenue Armory	
Europe
May 24, 2019	Berlin	Germany	Admiralspalast	
May 28, 2019	London	England	Alexandra Palace Theatre	
May 30, 2019 (Note: This concert is a part of Primavera Sound.)	Barcelona	Spain	Parc del Fòrum	—N/a
June 1, 2019 (Note: This concert is a part of We Love Green.)	Paris	France	Bois de Vincennes	—N/a
Oceania
June 9, 2019 (Note: This concert is a part of Vivid Sydney.)	Sydney	Australia	Carriageworks	—N/a
June 14, 2019 (Note: This concert is a part of Dark Mofo.)	Hobart	Australia	MAC2	—N/a
Leg 4 – North America
August 25, 2019 (Note: This concert is a part of Afropunk Festival Brooklyn.)	Brooklyn	United States	Commodore Barry Park	—N/a
October 12, 2019 (Note: This concert is a part of Afropunk Festival Atlanta.)	Atlanta	United States	787 Windsor	—N/a
November 2, 2019	Vancouver	Canada	Vogue Theatre	
November 3, 2019	Vancouver	Canada	Vogue Theatre	
November 4, 2019	Seattle	United States	Moore Theatre	
November 6, 2019	Oakland	United States	Fox Oakland Theatre	
November 7, 2019	Oakland	United States	Fox Oakland Theatre	
November 10, 2019 (Note: This concert is a part of Camp Flow Gnaw Festival.)	Los Angeles	United States	Dodger Stadium	—N/a
November 12, 2019	Denver	United States	Mission Ballroom	
November 14, 2019	Saint Paul	United States	Palace Theatre	
November 15, 2019	Chicago	United States	Riviera Theatre	
November 17, 2019	Toronto	Canada	Rebel	
November 19, 2019	Boston	United States	House of Blues	
November 20, 2019	New York City	United States	Kings Theatre	
November 21, 2019	New York City	United States	Kings Theatre	
Europe
November 25, 2019	London	England	O_{2} Academy Brixton	
November 27, 2019	Cologne	Germany	Carlswerk Victoria	
November 29, 2019	Milan	Italy	Fabrique Milano	
December 1, 2019	Paris	France	Salle Pleyel	
December 2, 2019	Brussels	Belgium	Cirque Royal	
December 3, 2019	Amsterdam	Netherlands	Royal Theater Carré	

=== Cancelled shows ===
List of cancelled concerts, showing date, city, country, venue and reason for cancellation
Date	City	Country	Venue	Reason
November 28, 2019	Zürich	Switzerland	X-Tra	Illness
April 9, 2020	Oakland	United States	Fox Oakland Theatre	COVID-19 pandemic
April 12, 2020 (Note: These concerts were part of Coachella.)	Indio	United States	Empire Polo Club	COVID-19 pandemic
April 15, 2020	Pomona	United States	Fox Theater Pomona	COVID-19 pandemic
April 19, 2020	Indio	United States	Empire Polo Club	COVID-19 pandemic
April 21, 2020	San Diego	United States	Balboa Theatre	COVID-19 pandemic
April 25, 2020 (Note: This concert is a part of Festival Ceremonia.)	Mexico City	Mexico	Campo Marte	COVID-19 pandemic
June 11, 2020 (Note: This concert is a part of NOS Primavera Sound.)	Porto	Portugal	Parque da Cidade	COVID-19 pandemic
June 12, 2020 (Note: This concert is a part of Paraíso Festival.)	Madrid	Spain	Complutense University of Madrid	COVID-19 pandemic
June 14, 2020 (Note: This concert is a part of Lovebox Festival.)	London	England	Gunnersbury Park	COVID-19 pandemic
June 26, 2020 (Note: This concert is a part of Glastonbury Festival.)	Pilton	England	Worthy Farm	COVID-19 pandemic
July 3, 2020 (Note: This concert is a part of Roskilde Festival.)	Roskilde	Denmark	Festivalpladsen	COVID-19 pandemic
July 4, 2020 (Note: This concert is a part of Open'er Festival.)	Gdynia	Poland	Gdynia-Kosakowo Airport	COVID-19 pandemic
July 5, 2020 (Note: This concert is a part of Down the Rabbit Hole.)	Beuningen	Netherlands	De Groene Heuvels	COVID-19 pandemic
July 9, 2020 (Note: This concert is a part of Pohoda Festival.)	Trenčín	Slovakia	Trenčín Airport	COVID-19 pandemic
July 11, 2020 (Note: This concert is a part of Bilbao BBK Live.)	Bilbao	Spain	Mount Cobetas	COVID-19 pandemic
July 12, 2020 (Note: This concert is a part of Afropunk Festival Paris.)	Paris	France	La Seine Musicale	COVID-19 pandemic
July 17, 2020 (Note: This concert is a part of Melt! Festival.)	Gräfenhainichen	Germany	Ferropolis	COVID-19 pandemic
August 11, 2020 (Note: This concert is a part of Sziget Festival.)	Budapest	Hungary	Hajógyári Island	COVID-19 pandemic
August 13, 2020 (Note: This concert is a part of Øyafestivalen.)	Oslo	Norway	Tøyen Park	COVID-19 pandemic
August 14, 2020 (Note: This concert is a part of Way Out West.)	Gothenburg	Sweden	Slottsskogen	COVID-19 pandemic
August 16, 2020 (Note: This concert is a part of Flow Festival.)	Helsinki	Finland	Suvilahti	COVID-19 pandemic
August 23, 2020 (Note: This concert is a part of Fuji Rock Festival.)	Yuzawa	Japan	Naeba Ski Resort	COVID-19 pandemic
