= Wonder Where We Land =

Studio album by Sbtrkt
- Released: 7 October 2014
- Recorded: Osea Island, Essex, UK; London, UK; Los Angeles; New York City
- Genres: Electronica; R&B; UK garage; hip hop
- Length: 42:23
- Label: Young Turks
- Producer: Sbtrkt

Sbtrkt chronology
Sbtrkt (2011)	Wonder Where We Land (2014)	Save Yourself (2016)

Singles from Wonder Where We Land
- 1. "Temporary View" Released: 6 June 2014; 2. "New Dorp. New York." Released: 23 July 2014

Wonder Where We Land is the second studio album from British producer Sbtrkt. It was released on 7 October 2014 through Young Turks.

== Background ==
For Wonder Where We Land, Sbtrkt aimed to expand the concept of the Sbtrkt identity belonging to one person by diverging from the club-inspired and minimal approach of his first album. In order to achieve this, Sbtrkt brought in a larger array of singers and musicians and conducted sessions in the US and the UK, notably Osea, a remote island of the coast of Essex. Sbtrkt and Sbtrkt's visual collaborator, A Hidden Place chose to visually reflect this expansion of the Sbtrkt identity by depicting the concept of Sbtrkt as an unknown quadrupedal masked creature on the artwork of this album.

The record is dedicated to Sbtrkt's older brother, Daniel, who died from cancer during the album's creation.

== Critical reception ==
Professional ratings
Aggregate scores
Source	Rating
Metacritic	71/100
Review scores
Source	Rating
AllMusic	3.5/5 stars
Clash	8/10
Consequence of Sound	B+
Paste	9.3/10
Pitchfork	5.5/10

Wonder Where We Land received mostly positive reviews from contemporary music critics. At Metacritic, which assigns a normalized rating out of 100 to reviews from mainstream critics, the album received an average score of 71, based on 21 reviews, which indicates "generally favorable reviews".

== Track listing ==
Wonder Where We Land track listing
No.	Title	Length
1.	"Day 1"	0:33
2.	"Wonder Where We Land" (featuring Sampha)	2:45
3.	"Lantern"	2:00
4.	"Higher" (featuring Raury)	4:13
5.	"Day 5"	0:23
6.	"Look Away" (featuring Caroline Polachek)	4:16
7.	"Osea" (featuring Koreless)	2:38
8.	"Temporary View" (featuring Sampha)	3:26
9.	"New Dorp. New York." (featuring Ezra Koenig)	3:00
10.	"Everybody Knows"	3:31
11.	"Problem (Solved)" (featuring Jessie Ware)	2:39
12.	"If It Happens" (featuring Sampha)	1:29
13.	"Gon Stay" (featuring Sampha)	3:36
14.	"The Light" (featuring Denai Moore)	3:06
15.	"Voices in My Head" (featuring ASAP Ferg)	4:48
Total length:		42:23

Deluxe edition bonus tracks
No.	Title	Length
16.	"Forgotten" (featuring Raury)	0:59
17.	"Paper Cuts"	2:27
18.	"War Drums" (featuring Warpaint)	2:55
19.	"Spaced Out" (featuring Boogie)	3:40
20.	"Maybe" (featuring Andrew Ashong and Sampha)	3:17
21.	"Decemberist"	2:27
22.	"Tamagotchi" (bonus track)	2:24
23.	"Told You" (bonus track)	3:53
Total length:		64:25

== Charts ==
Chart performance for Wonder Where We Land
Chart (2014)	Peak position
Australian Albums (ARIA)	20
Belgian Albums (Ultratop Flanders)	37
Belgian Albums (Ultratop Wallonia)	83
French Albums (SNEP)	80
Dutch Albums (Album Top 100)	66
Scottish Albums (Official Charts)	36
Swiss Albums (Schweizer Hitparade)	44
UK Albums (Official Charts)	16
UK Dance Albums (Official Charts)	1
UK Independent Albums (Official Charts)	2
US Billboard 200	84
