= Eusexua Tour =

2025 concert tour by FKA Twigs

- Tour by FKA Twigs
- Official poster for Eusexua Tour
- Location: Europe • North America
- Associated album: Eusexua
- Start date: 13 March 2025
- End date: 23 August 2025
- No. of shows: 22
- Supporting acts: Koreless; DJ Speedsick

FKA Twigs concert chronology
- Magdalene Tour (2019); Eusexua Tour (2025); Body High Tour (2026)

The Eusexua Tour was the third concert tour held by English singer, songwriter, and dancer FKA Twigs, in support of her third studio album, Eusexua (2025). The tour was announced on 16 January 2025, starting in Paris, France, on 13 March 2025, and concluding on 23 August 2025 at the All Points East festival in London, England.

== Background ==
FKA Twigs embarked in 2019 on the Magdalene Tour, her second concert tour, in support of her sophomore studio album, Magdalene (2018). It abruptly concluded halfway through before the COVID-19 pandemic forced the closure of performance venues and mass gathering events, which led to the recording process of her debut mixtape, Caprisongs (2022). Years later, Twigs' third studio album, titled Eusexua, was announced on 13 September 2024, and released on 24 January 2025.

On 16 January 2025, during her birthday, Twigs formally announced the Eusexua Tour with ten shows across Europe and North America, spanning from March to April 2025, and with appearances at multiple festivals as well. Tickets went on sale on 24 January, and several presales ran from 21 to 23 January. On 21 January, extra dates for Chicago, Toronto and New York City were added due to "high demand". Two days later, an additional second show in London was also announced after tickets quickly sold out. On 6 March, Twigs postponed the initial Berlin and Prague dates of the tour due to "unforeseen production issues", with both shows being rescheduled to 30 and 31 May, respectively. Three weeks later, Twigs posted a video via TikTok to notify the postponement of several North American shows caused by failed visa paperwork for the stage ensemble.

== Set list ==
The following set list is obtained from the show in Paris on 13 March 2025. It is not intended to represent all dates throughout the tour.

=== March 2025 to April 2025 ===
Act I - The Practice

1. "Thousand Eyes" / "Mary Magdalene"
2. "Figure 8" / "Room of Fools" (contains elements of "Weak Spot")
3. "Hours"
4. "Striptease"

Act II - State of Being

5. "How's That" (interlude)
6. "Eusexua"
7. "Perfectly" / "Drums of Death"
8. "Keep It, Hold It"
9. "Sticky"
10. "Perfect Stranger"
11. "Oh My Love"
12. "Honda" / "Papi Bones"
13. "Childlike Things" / "Ego Death"
14. "Glass & Patron" / "Vogue" (Madonna song; remix)
15. "Girl Feels Good"

Act III - The Pinnacle

16. "Home with You"
17. "Got to Feel"
18. "Numbers"
19. "Water Me"
20. "Two Weeks"
21. "24hr Dog"

Encore - Human Experience

22. "Cellophane"

=== May 2025 to August 2025 ===
Act I - The Practice

1. "Techno Ballet" (Intro)
2. "Perfect Stranger"
3. "Room Of Fools" (contains elements of "Weak Spot")
4. "Striptease"
5. "24hr Dog"

Act II - State Of Being

1. "Eusexua"
2. "Perfectly"
3. "Drums Of Death"
4. "oh my love"
5. "honda" / "papi bones"
6. "Glass & Patron" / "Sushi" (contains elements of "Vogue")
7. "Girl Feels Good"

Act III - The Pinnacle

1. "Home With You"
2. "Numbers"
3. "Water Me"
4. "Two Weeks"
5. "Cellophane"

== Tour dates ==
List of concerts, showing date, city, country, venue and opening acts
Date (2025)	City	Country	Venue	Opening act
13 March	Paris	France	Zénith Paris	Koreless
15 March	Brussels	Belgium	Halles de Schaerbeek/Hallen van Schaarbeek	Koreless
18 March	Manchester	England	Factory International	Koreless
21 March	London	England	Magazine	Koreless
22 March	London	England	Magazine	Koreless
30 May (Note: Originally scheduled to take place on 11 March 2025, it was rescheduled due to production issues.)	Berlin	Germany	Uber Eats Music Hall	Koreless
31 May (Note: Originally scheduled to take place on 8 March 2025, it was rescheduled due to production issues.)	Prague	Czech Republic	Forum Karlín	Koreless
5 June (Note: The show on 5 June 2025, is a part of Primavera Sound.)	Barcelona	Spain	Parc del Fòrum	Koreless
8 June (Note: The show on 8 June 2025, is a part of We Love Green.)	Paris	France	Bois de Vincennes	Koreless
20 June (Note: The show on 19–21 June 2025, is a part of MEO Kalorama.)	Lisbon	Portugal	Parque da Bela Vista	Koreless
24 June (Note: Originally scheduled to take place on 26 and 27 March 2025, these were rescheduled due to logistic and production issues.)	Chicago	United States	The Salt Shed	Koreless; DJ Speedsick
25 June	Chicago	United States	The Salt Shed	Koreless; DJ Speedsick
28 June	Brooklyn	United States	Under The K Bridge Park	–
3 July (Note: The show on 3 July 2025, is a part of Roskilde Festival.)	Roskilde	Denmark	Dyrskuepladsen	–
4 July (Note: The show on 4 July 2025, is a part of Open'er Festival.)	Gdynia	Poland	Gdynia-Kosakowo Airport	–
5 July (Note: The show on 5 July 2025, is a part of Down the Rabbit Hole.)	Beuningen	Netherlands	Groene Heuvels	–
13 July	Montreux	Switzerland	Scene Du Lac	–
18 July (Note: The show on 18 July 2025, is a part of Dour Festival.)	Dour	Belgium	Plaine de la Machine à Feu	–
8 August (Note: The show on 8 August 2025, is a part of Flow Festival.)	Helsinki	Finland	Suvilahti	–
9 August (Note: The show on 9 August 2025, is a part of Sziget Festival.)	Budapest	Hungary	Obudai-sziget	–
16 August	Biddinghuizen	Netherlands	Evenemententerrein Walibi Holland	–
23 August	London	England	Victoria Park	–

=== Cancelled shows ===
List of cancelled concerts
Date	City	Country	Venue	Reason
6 April (Note: The show on 6 April 2025, was set to be a part of AXE Ceremonia.)	Mexico City	Mexico	Parque Bicentenario	Logistic and production issues
11 April (Note: The concerts on 11 and 18 April 2025, were set to be part of Coachella Valley Music and Arts Festival.)	Indio	United States	Empire Polo Club	Logistic and production issues
18 April	Indio	United States	Empire Polo Club	Logistic and production issues
19 April	San Francisco	United States	Bill Graham Civic Auditorium	Logistic and production issues
23 April (Note: Originally scheduled to take place on 3 and 4 April 2025, these were rescheduled due to logistic and production issues.)	New York City	United States	Knockdown Center	Logistic and production issues
24 April	New York City	United States	Knockdown Center	Logistic and production issues
30 March	Toronto	Canada	History	No reason provided
31 March	Toronto	Canada	History	No reason provided

== Footnotes ==
Festivals

Others
