= Sum Bout U =

Single by 645AR featuring FKA Twigs
- Released: August 4, 2020
- Genre: Squeak rap; R&B
- Length: 2:13
- Label: Columbia
- Songwriters: SenseiATL; 645AR; El Guincho; FKA Twigs
- Producers: SenseiATL; El Guincho (co.)

645AR singles chronology
"Itchy Fingers" (2020)	"Sum Bout U" (2020)	"4 da Trap (Fine Tuned Version)" (2020)

FKA Twigs singles chronology
"Ego Death" (2020)	"Sum Bout U" (2020)	"Don't Judge Me" (2021)

Music video
- "Sum Bout U" on YouTube

"Sum Bout U" is a song by American rapper 645AR featuring English singer-songwriter FKA Twigs, released on August 4, 2020, by Columbia Records. The song was written alongside producer SenseiATL and co-producer El Guincho, and came with a music video directed by Aidan Zamiri.

== Promotion ==
Twigs teased the cover art for the single on August 1.

== Style and reception ==
Pitchfork's Alphonse Pierre notes that while the two artists seem very different, Twigs' distinct falsetto and 645AR's signature squeaky rap style are surprisingly similar. Calling their respective vocals "the highbrow and lowbrow versions of similar styles" and the song an "unhinged duet", Pierre praises the two as "angelic and sweet" and "bizarre, but somehow kind of gentle" respectively. He compares their romantic back-and-forth to that of Usher and Alicia Keys on the chorus of their 2004 duet "My Boo", with "the most romantic squeaks you'll come across" and SenseiATL's colorful '90s R&B-influenced production elevating the lovestruck mood. Consequence of Sound's Lake Schatz notes 645AR as bringing his typical squeak rap style to the song, but with "a more steady R&B vibe" than his other hit songs.

== Music video ==
The music video, directed by Aidan Zamiri, features 645AR at a computer watching videos on a fictional OnlyFans-styled website called Onlycamzzz, where Twigs dances and poses suggestively while dressed in various anime-inspired costumes, high-end fashion outfits, and a rabbit mask. The video is said to explore digital intimacy and demonstrate the artistic nature of sex work. The video concept was conceived by Twigs and its release coincided with her launching a charitable fundraiser for sex workers. Pitchfork called the video the fourth-best of August 2020 and among the 20 best of the whole year.

Twigs' look in the video was frequently noted for involving very thin eyebrows, part of an ongoing fashion trend that had been revived around the time after having been popular in the late 1990s and early 2000s.

== Personnel ==
- 645AR – vocals, songwriter
- FKA Twigs – vocals, songwriter
- SenseiATL – producer, songwriter, recording engineer, mastering engineer
- El Guincho – co-producer, songwriter
- Alex Tumay – mixing engineer
- Christal Jerez and Nathan Miller – assistant engineers
