= Izzy Spears =

American musician

- Born: Isaac Benyamin; Atlanta, Georgia, U.S.
- Origin: Atlanta, Georgia, U.S.
- Genres: Rock; Punk; Hip-hop; Grunge; Horrorcore
- Occupations: singer, songwriter, composer
- Instrument: Vocals
- Years active: 2019–present
- Label: KRS Records
- Formerly of: Deaddogs, Anonymous Club
- Awards: Design and Art Direction Award, Clio Music Award, Berlin Music Video Award, Berlin Commercial Award

Isaac Benyamin, known professionally as Izzy Spears, is an American singer, songwriter, and composer from Atlanta, Georgia. He has released multiple EPs, including Monstar (2022), M*A*D (2023), and Blood, Sweat and Damnation (2024). His work also includes the short film and music video for his single "Burn" featuring Leya, which earned him a Design and Art Direction Award for Music Video, a Clio Music Award for Music Film and Video Craft, and a Berlin Music Video Award for Best VFX.

== Early life ==
Spears grew up in Atlanta, Georgia. He was raised Jewish in a household led by his mother, who supported eight children. He has described music as a formative influence from an early age, noting his brother's rap group and his own attempts at writing raps with the hope of joining the group.

Spears began making his own music while in high school. He has stated that he largely disengaged from formal education by the seventh grade and left school after completing the tenth grade.

== Career ==
In 2019, Spears began his music career as one half of punk duo Deaddogs with musician, and boyfriend at the time, Nigel Mackenzie. The duo later gained wider attention within Atlanta's underground music scene. In August, 2019, Deaddogs released their first song, "Regina", and opened for Upchuck during their Afropunk shows in Brooklyn and Atlanta. Later in 2019, Spears was introduced to Shayne Oliver and joined his musical collective Anonymous Club.

In August 2022, Spears released the single "FIST" after opening for Yves Tumor on the European stretch of his tour. In late 2022, he released his debut EP, Monstar. The following year, he was a supporting act for Tumor on select North American dates of his tour. Spears then released his second EP, M*A*D in December 2023. In October 2024, he collaborated with Jack Powers for the song "Hey There". That same year, he released his third EP, Blood, Sweat and Damnation.

Image of scene in "Burn" music video which features Izzy Spears with living mannequins.

Spears released the single "Burn" featuring Leya in 2025. The short film and music video for the single was directed by the collective Ataka51. The project was inspired by The Wizard of Oz, and was highlighted for its multidisciplinary use of music video, fashion, and short film. The film features imagery where "dolls come to life" in a city that is "filled with living mannequins."

"Burn" was shortlisted for Best Production Design at the Kinsale Shark Awards and nominated for Best Visual Effects in a Video at the UK Music Video Awards. It went on to win a Design and Art Direction Award for Music Video and a Berlin Music Video Award for Best VFX.

In January 2026, "Burn" won a Clio Music Award for Music Film and Video Craft.

== Artistic style and influences ==
Spears's musical style draws on aspects of rock, punk, hip hop and grunge. One critic described him as making "sweaty gay electro-punk with a cynical sneer". Another critic described his work as "raw and uncensored", calling his songwriting "autobiographical". George Clinton, André 3000, and Yves Tumor have been cited as influences on his work.

== Personal life ==
Spears resides in Los Angeles. He identifies as gay.

== Discography ==
=== Extended plays ===
- Monstar (2022)
- M*A*D (Miss American Dream) (2023)
- Blood, Sweat and Damnation (2024)

=== Singles ===
- "FIST" (2022)
- "Freaks" (2022)
- "Serena" (2023)
- "Hey There" ft. Jack Powers (2024)
- "Burn" ft. Leya (2025)

== Videography ==
=== Music videos ===
- "Serena" (2023)
- "Burn" (2025)

== Awards and nominations ==
=== Music, video, and media awards ===
Year	Organization	Category	Work	Result	Ref.
2025	Berlin Commercial Festival	New Generation Award	Burn	Won	
2025	Berlin Music Video Awards	Best VFX	Burn	2nd Place	
2025	Ciclope Festival	Music Videos: VFX	Burn	Bronze	
2025	Design and Art Direction Awards	Music Videos: Visual Effects	Burn	Wood Pencil	
2025	Kinsale Shark Awards	Music Video - International: Best Production Design	Burn	Shortlisted	
2025	Prix Club des Directeurs Artistiques (Club des DA)	Art Direction	Burn	Silver	
2025	Prix Club des Directeurs Artistiques (Club des DA)	Design & Production	Burn	Silver	
2025	UK Music Video Awards	Best Visual Effects in a Video	Burn	Nominated	
2026	Clio Music Awards	Music Film & Video Craft: Animation	Burn	Bronze	

=== Listicles ===
Publisher	Year	Listicle	Result	Ref.
Them	2022	Our 24 Favorite Songs by LGBTQ+ Artists in 2022	Placed	
The Face	2022	2022’s Sexiest, Silliest and Most Brilliantly Strange Musicians	Placed	
The Guardian	2023	2023’s Most Promising Musical Newcomers	Placed	
Alternative Press	2024	24 of the Most Exciting Rising Artists to Watch in 2024	Placed	
