= 645AR =

American rapper (born 1997)

- Born: Austin Alan Rochez; September 2, 1997 (age 29); South Bronx, New York City
- Origin: Atlanta, Georgia
- Genres: Squeak rap; hyperpop
- Occupation: Rapper
- Years active: 2016–present
- Label: Columbia (former)

Austin Alan Rochez (born September 2, 1997), known professionally as 645AR, is an American rapper. Best known for his use of a high-pitched voice, a hallmark of the hip hop style dubbed "squeak rap", he has released singles with artists such as Danny Brown, Tyga, FKA Twigs, Tony Shhnow, BabyTron, Tommy Cash, Valee, and Dorian Electra. 645AR first gained recognition after his 2018 single "Crack" went viral, and he further solidified his success with the release of "4 da Trap" the following year. He subsequently signed with Columbia Records.

== Life and career ==
Rochez was born in the South Bronx region of New York City on September 2, 1997. He is of Honduran descent. At age 11, he moved with his family to the Southern United States, living in Florida for about a year before settling in Smyrna, Georgia, a city just outside of Atlanta. While there, he made connections with local rappers such as Lil Yachty through his friendships with JWitDaBeam and Slimesito. He returned to New York in 2016 to attend Hostos Community College, playing basketball for the school's team, but his interest in music led him to return to Atlanta that same year where the hip hop scene had been heating up with the advent of trap's rise in popularity. The numbers in his name came from his building number in the Bronx, while the letters are his first and last initials.

After producing several songs, Rochez recognized the importance of distinguishing himself. He first employed his signature squeaky voice in the 2018 single "Crack". The song garnered attention, including from the music industry, when its video was reposted by fellow New Yorker Lil Tecca. This led to the release of his self-titled debut album in 2019, and the single "4 da Trap" later in the year. "4 da Trap" spread rapidly across the internet, to the extent that Twitter suspended 645AR's account, mistaking it for spam. The momentum led the rapper to sign a record deal with Columbia Records.

== Style and reception ==
645AR is best known for popularizing the hip hop subgenre known as "squeak rap". Building off of the experimental vocal styles of rappers such as Future, Playboi Carti, and Young Thug (645AR has stated that he has heard comparisons of his work to Carti, Thug, and hyperpop duo 100 gecs), squeaking revolves around high-pitched vocalizations delivered through an "otherworldly curvature of the voice". These vocal distortions are said to replace lyrics in delivering the meaning of the songs, with said lyrics becoming "virtually indecipherable", according to AV Club. Other names for the style include "baby voice rap", "chipmunk rap", and "fetus vocal rap". 645AR has said he intends for his music to make listeners have out-of-body experiences, "like they're in another world." Though often suspected of being achieved artificially with tools such as pitch correction, 645AR has stated that his squeak is entirely natural, and even demonstrated it live in a video for Genius. His natural voice is a baritone. Dr. Calbert Graham of the University of Cambridge Language Sciences Centre said 645AR's voice sounded like a human synthesizer, and that it sounded like he was tensing his thyrohyoid muscle to achieve his falsetto. Graham said he "wouldn't imagine a musician would say that's the proper way of producing a falsetto", calling it innovative and saying 645AR is "testing the boundaries of what constitutes rap".

Squeak rap is often described as a musical internet meme, something which 645AR is noted as embracing, up to and including a video he made in which he jokingly claims that his voice originated from having been possessed by Mickey Mouse. He is also frequently compared to fictional characters with high-pitched voices such as Mickey Mouse, Alvin and the Chipmunks, Elmo, Pikachu, and Isabelle from the video game series Animal Crossing, as well as animals such as mosquitoes, mice, and bedbugs. Despite this, 645AR is also considered to be sincere about his work, saying he finds his lyrics to be important and that he takes more time writing them than other artists. According to HotNewHipHop, he "speaks to the streets with harrowing tales".

645AR's style has been compared to hyperpop, with the rapper even being outright called a hyperpop artist. He has made songs with hyperpop artists such as Dorian Electra, Isomonstrosity, and Umru. The latter song was featured on hyperpop pioneer record label PC Music's compilation album PC Music, Vol. 3.

Multiple artists have had their own use of falsetto compared to 645AR, such as Adam Levine, Baby Keem, FKA Twigs, and Fousheé.

=== Influences ===
While growing up in the Bronx, 645AR listened to New York rappers 50 Cent and Jay-Z. After moving south, he incorporated Southern rappers T-Pain and Lil Wayne into his listening.

== Discography ==
=== Albums ===
- 645AR (2019, self-released)
- In Dat Mode (2024)
- Most Hated (2025)

=== Mixtapes ===
- 96 Problemz (2017)
- Fix da Rap Game (2018)
- SOS 5 (2018)
- Sink or Swim (2022)

=== EPs ===
- Sink or Swim (2017)
- Stack or Starve (2018)
- S.O.S III (2018)
- S.O.S IV (2018)
- Get Rich or Die Drowning (2018, with 10kDunkin and JWitDaBeam)
- 2 Train 2 Foreigns (2018)
- Rags 2 Expensive Rags (2019)
- 2 Train 2 Foreigns 2 (2019)
- No Label (2020)
- Most Hated (2021)
- Unorthodox (2022, with SenseiATL)
- New Beginnings (2022, with Lil Crank)
- Unstoppable (2022)
- S.O.S Vol. 1 (2024)
- Space AR Star (2024)
- 645AR&B (2024)

=== Singles ===
645AR singles
Year	Title	Other artists	Release
2017	"Hollywood Road"	Larry League, Reddo, 10kDunkin, Tony Shhnow	Non-album single
2017	"Workin"	10kDunkin, FastATL	96 Problemz
2017	"NoProblems"		96 Problemz
2018	"Out of Boundz"		Non-album singles
2018	"End of the Day"	Slimesito	Non-album singles
2018	"True 2 Dat"	JWitDaBeam	S.O.S III
2018	"Copy"	10kDunkin	Non-album singles
2018	"#FreeTony Freestyle"	10kDunkin	Non-album singles
2018	"Monster"	Reddo, Tony Shhnow, 10kDunkin, Larry League	Non-album singles
2018	"Day Day Bishop"		Non-album singles
2018	"Itch"		Non-album singles
2018	"Knicks"	Texako	Non-album singles
2018	"Money in There"	Larry Loudpack	Non-album singles
2018	"Zoo"	Tony Shhnow	Non-album singles
2018	"Crack"	Tony Shhnow, Bag Ty	645AR
2019	"SOS da Gang"	Tony Shhnow	Non-album singles
2019	"Militant"	Lil Xelly, 10kDunkin, Bag Ty	Non-album singles
2019	"Dat Guy"		Non-album singles
2019	"Notta Rapper"	JWitDaBeam, 10kDunkin	Non-album singles
2019	"Zion"		Non-album singles
2019	"Salute"		Non-album singles
2019	"Up"	JWitDaBeam, Tony Shhnow	Non-album singles
2019	"Aint Tryna Kick It"	Hate	Non-album singles
2019	"Bible and a K"		645AR
2019	"Plan"	Reddo	Non-album singles
2019	"Beef It Up"		Non-album singles
2019	"Check Off a Voice"	10kDunkin	Non-album singles
2019	"Momma Beat Me I Beat Dat Block"	JWitDaBeam, 10kDunkin, Tony Shhnow	Non-album singles
2019	"Like Mike"	NGeeYL	Non-album singles
2019	"Yoga"		Non-album singles
2019	"Rundown"	DoobieRockStar, 3AGPilot, JWitDaBeam	Non-album singles
2019	"4 da Trap"		Most Hated
2020	"Ready Set Go"	JWitDaBeam, 10kDunkin	Non-album singles
2020	"Beat It"	BabyTron	Non-album singles
2020	"Flight to LA"	Bouba Savage	Non-album singles
2020	"In Love With a Stripper"		Non-album singles
2020	"Juggin Got Me Rich"	DQTheGawd	Non-album singles
2020	"Finger Roll"		Non-album singles
2020	"Dash"		Non-album singles
2020	"Made a Way"		Non-album singles
2020	"Itchy Fingers"		Non-album singles
2020	"Sum Bout U"	FKA Twigs	Non-album singles
2020	"4 da Trap (Fine Tuned Version)"		Non-album singles
2020	"Ride 4 You"		Non-album singles
2020	"After L Come M"		2 Train 2 Foreigns 2
2021	"Aint No Rule"	10kDunkin	Non-album singles
2021	"Chirpin"		Non-album singles
2021	"Count On"		Non-album singles
2021	"Happy"	Dorian Electra	Non-album singles
2021	"Rental"	Lil Reek	Non-album singles
2021	"Check1"	Umru, Tommy Cash	Non-album singles
2021	"On My Back"		Non-album singles
2022	"God Chose Me"	Tyga	Non-album singles
2022	"Never That"	MVW, Valee	Non-album singles
2022	"Check1 (Six Impala remix)"	Umru, Tommy Cash	Non-album singles
2022	"Careful What You Wish For"	Isomonstrosity, Danny Brown	Non-album singles
2023	"MS20"	Lapsung	Non-album singles
2023	"Got 2 Kno"		Non-album singles
2023	"Shot 4 Shot"	Yuno Miles	Non-album singles
2024	"Get Thru"		Non-album singles
2024	"S10T"	Xato	Non-album singles
2024	"Midnight"		Non-album singles
