= FKA Twigs =

English singer, songwriter, and dancer (born 1988)

- FKA Twigs in 2025

Background information
- Born: Tahliah Debrett Barnett; 17 January 1988 (age 38); Cheltenham, Gloucestershire, England
- Genres: Avant-pop; electronic; art pop; R&B; trip hop; techno
- Occupations: Singer; songwriter; record producer; dancer; actress
- Instrument: Vocals • Keyboards • Drums
- Works: Discography
- Years active: 2004–present
- Labels: Young; XL; Atlantic
- Awards: Full list
- Website: fkatwigsofficial.com

Tahliah Debrett Barnett (born 17 January 1988), known professionally as FKA Twigs (stylised as FKA twigs), is an English singer, songwriter, record producer, actress, and dancer. She was a backup dancer for numerous musicians, and made her musical debut with EP1 (2012), following a year later with EP2 (2013). Barnett's debut studio album, LP1 (2014), reached number 16 on the UK Albums Chart and number 30 on the US Billboard 200, and received a nomination for that year's Mercury Prize. She then released her third EP, M3LL155X (2015).

Barnett took a four-year hiatus before releasing her second studio album, Magdalene (2019). After signing with Atlantic Records, she released her debut mixtape, Caprisongs (2022). Her third and fourth studio albums, Eusexua and Eusexua Afterglow, were released in 2025, with the former receiving the Grammy Award for Best Dance/Electronic Album. Her work has garnered critical acclaim and has been described as "genre-bending", drawing on various genres including electronic music, trip hop, R&B, hyperpop, and the avant-garde.

== Early life and education ==
Tahliah Debrett Barnett was born on 17 January 1988 in Cheltenham, Gloucestershire, the only child of an English mother who was a dancer and gymnast and a Jamaican father who was a musician. She is related to fellow English singer Jorja Smith as cousins through her paternal side. She has Spanish ancestry from her mother's side of the family. She was raised by her mother and stepfather, whom she described as a "jazz fanatic of Bajan descent", and did not meet her biological father until she was 18. Barnett grew up in Cheltenham, a spa town she described as being "kind of in the middle of nowhere". She attended St Edward's School, a private co-educational Catholic school. Her education at the school was funded by a scholarship award. From a young age, she undertook opera and ballet lessons and took part in several St Edward's School productions.

At age 16, Barnett started making music in youth clubs. At age 17, she moved to South London to pursue a career as a dancer, and enrolled at the BRIT School. At age 18, she began working with local record producers to try to find her own musical sound. Around this time, she wrote the song "I'm Your Doll" and ended up producing a lot of what she considers to be "really bad demos". After changing her focus from dance to music, she transferred to Croydon College to pursue an education in fine arts. She worked as a backup dancer in music videos by artists such as Kylie Minogue, Plan B, Ed Sheeran, Taio Cruz, Dionne Bromfield, Jessie J, and Wretch 32. She was a backup dancer for Jessie J in her 2010 video for "Do It like a Dude", and appeared again in her 2011 video for "Price Tag". For a time, she worked as a hostess in a strip club and sang periodically at the Box Soho in Soho, City of Westminster.

== Career ==
=== 2012–2013: Career beginnings ===
In 2012, Barnett was photographed for the cover of i-D magazine. She became known as Twigs for the way her joints crack. She added the letters FKA to her name when another act called the Twigs – twin sisters active and recording since 1994 – asked her to change her stage name. It was believed or assumed that the "FKA" stood for the business abbreviation "formerly known as", but Barnett has said in multiple interviews that the letters do not stand for anything in particular: "[I]t's just a collection of letters. I was gonna be like FK1 Twigs ... or AFK Twigs ... I just wanted a selection of letters that sounded quite kind of masculine and strong. FKA just worked. It doesn't stand for anything, it's just capital letters."

Barnett self-released her music debut, EP1, on Bandcamp on 4 December 2012. She posted a video for each song on her YouTube channel. In August 2013, she released the video for her first single, "Water Me", directed by Jesse Kanda. That same month The Guardian profiled Barnett for their "New Band of the Day" feature, describing her as "the UK's best example to date of ethereal, twisted R&B". Barnett's second extended play, EP2, was released through the Young Turks record label in September. It was produced by Barnett and Arca. Pitchfork gave EP2 a rating of 8/10. In December, she was nominated for the BBC's Sound of 2014 prize, and was chosen by Spotify for their Spotlight on 2014 list. Barnett was then featured on Billboard's 14 Artists to Watch in 2014.

=== 2014–2017: LP1 and M3LL155X ===
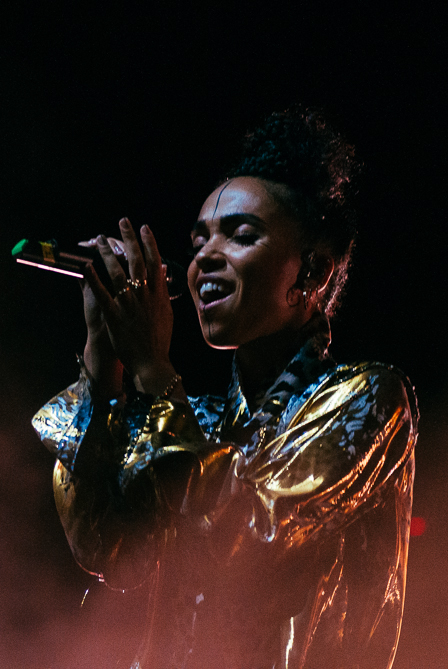
FKA Twigs performing live in Berlin (March 2015)

In April 2014, Barnett appeared on the cover of The Fader for its 91st issue. She began writing for her first studio album during a period of "self-hatred", which she considers "quite normal" for a young person. On 24 June, she released "Two Weeks", the lead single from her forthcoming album, alongside a video. Barnett directed and guest-starred in the music video for "Ouch Ouch" by rapper Lucki Eck$; she produced the track. The second single, "Pendulum", was released on 29 July.

Her debut studio album, LP1, was released on 6 August through the record label Young Turks. The album received widespread critical acclaim and placed high on several year-end critics' lists. Time gave a positive review, saying that Barnett has "made that transition to one of the most compelling and complex acts in R&B", and later ranked it, as did Clash, No. 1 album of the year. She then announced a world tour starting on 2 October at The Dome in Brighton, East Sussex and ending on 3 December in Orlando, Florida at The Social. That same August, Barnett was signed to London-based production company Academy Films. On 20 August, she uploaded three videos to her YouTube channel which she directed: a video titled "Wet Wipez", starring the London dance crew of the same name; a video titled "tw-ache", which is a remix of the EP1 song "Ache"; and a video for the Lucki Eck$ track "Ouch Ouch", which she produced. In September, LP1 was revealed as one of the nominees for the 2014 Mercury Prize. The same month, Barnett performed on BBC's Later... with Jools Holland. In October, "Video Girl", the third and last single from the album, was released alongside a video a few days later, as well as an advert for Google Glass which Barnett directed. She made her US television debut on The Tonight Show Starring Jimmy Fallon on 4 November.

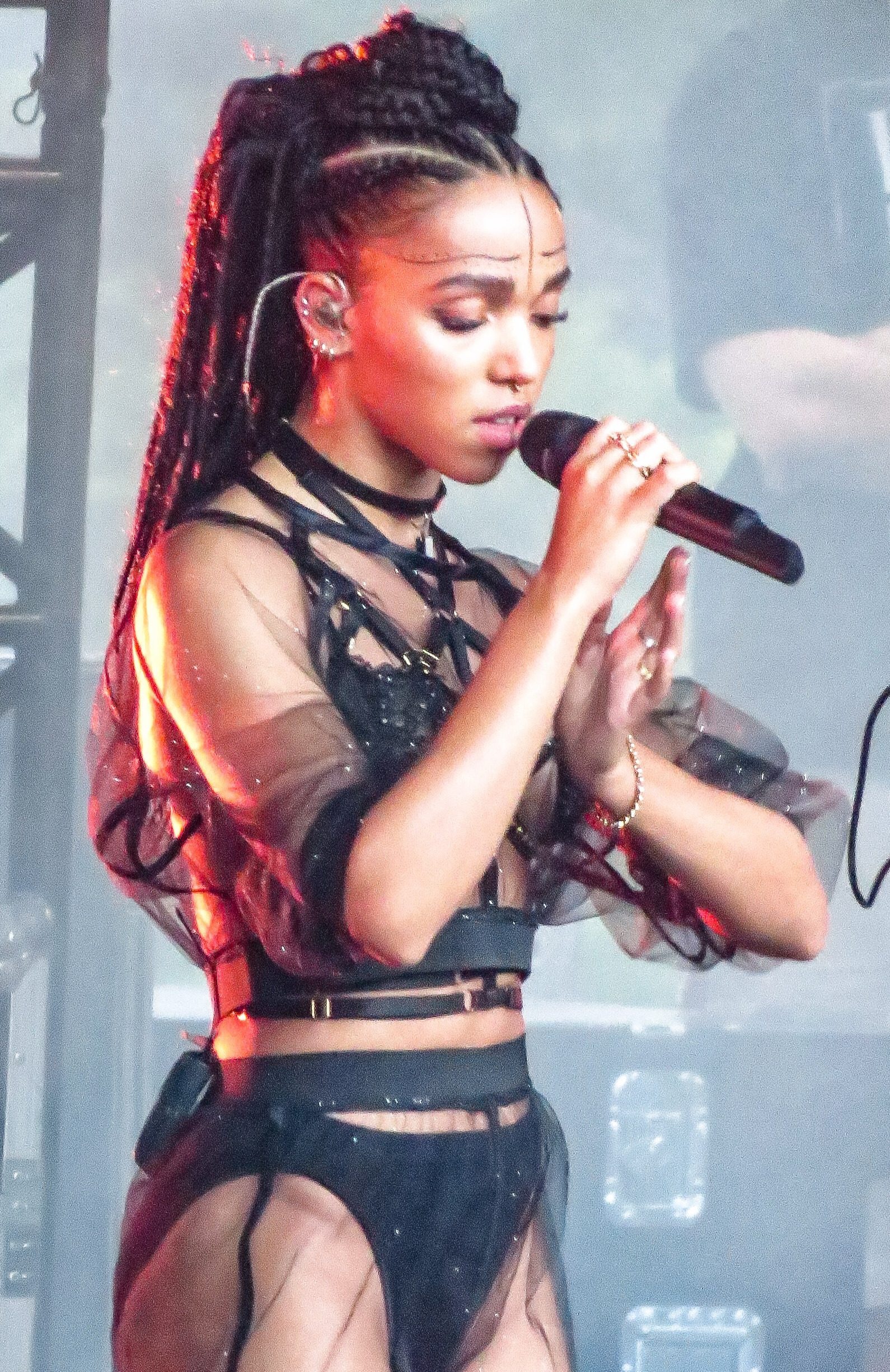
FKA Twigs performing at the Laneway Festival in Sydney (2015)

In 2014, producer Boots announced he was working with Barnett on her third EP. The video for "Glass & Patron", the first song released from this EP, was posted on her YouTube channel on 23 March 2015; it was directed by Barnett. In February 2015, she performed Congregata, a theatrical "coming together" and choreographed performance that visualised "the story of my life while making this album" at the Roundhouse in Camden, London. On 15 May, on her Instagram account, she posted a picture of men posing with jackets on that had an image of Barnett's face from the "Papi Pacify" video with Barnett captioning the pic "coming soon... <3", hinting at either merchandise or EP3's alleged release in the summer. During an interview with Complex released in June, she stated that she had changed the title of the EP to Melissa, and that it would be released within two months. She confirmed it would include the songs "Glass & Patron", "Mothercreep", "I'm Your Doll", "Figure 8", and "In Time". The EP, stylised as M3LL155X, was released in 2015, containing all five announced tracks and accompanied by four videos, which were directed by Barnett, featuring pregnancy, sex dolls, vogueing and Michèle Lamy.

In 2016, Barnett debuted a new song and music video titled "Good to Love". The song premiered earlier at Soundtrack 7, her seven-day residency at Manchester International Festival that took place in July 2015. She performed the song on The Tonight Show Starring Jimmy Fallon on 24 February. On 9 July, Barnett debuted a new stage show called Radiant Me² at Moscow's Lastochka Festival, where she unveiled three previously unheard songs. In 2016 the dance film Soundtrack 7 was premiered. Directed by Barnett, the film was created, performed and filmed on-site across seven days at Manchester International Festival in 2015. She did advertising work directing, narrating and starring in a television ad for Nike, and dancing in Apple's advertisement for HomePod.

=== 2018–2022: Magdalene and Caprisongs ===
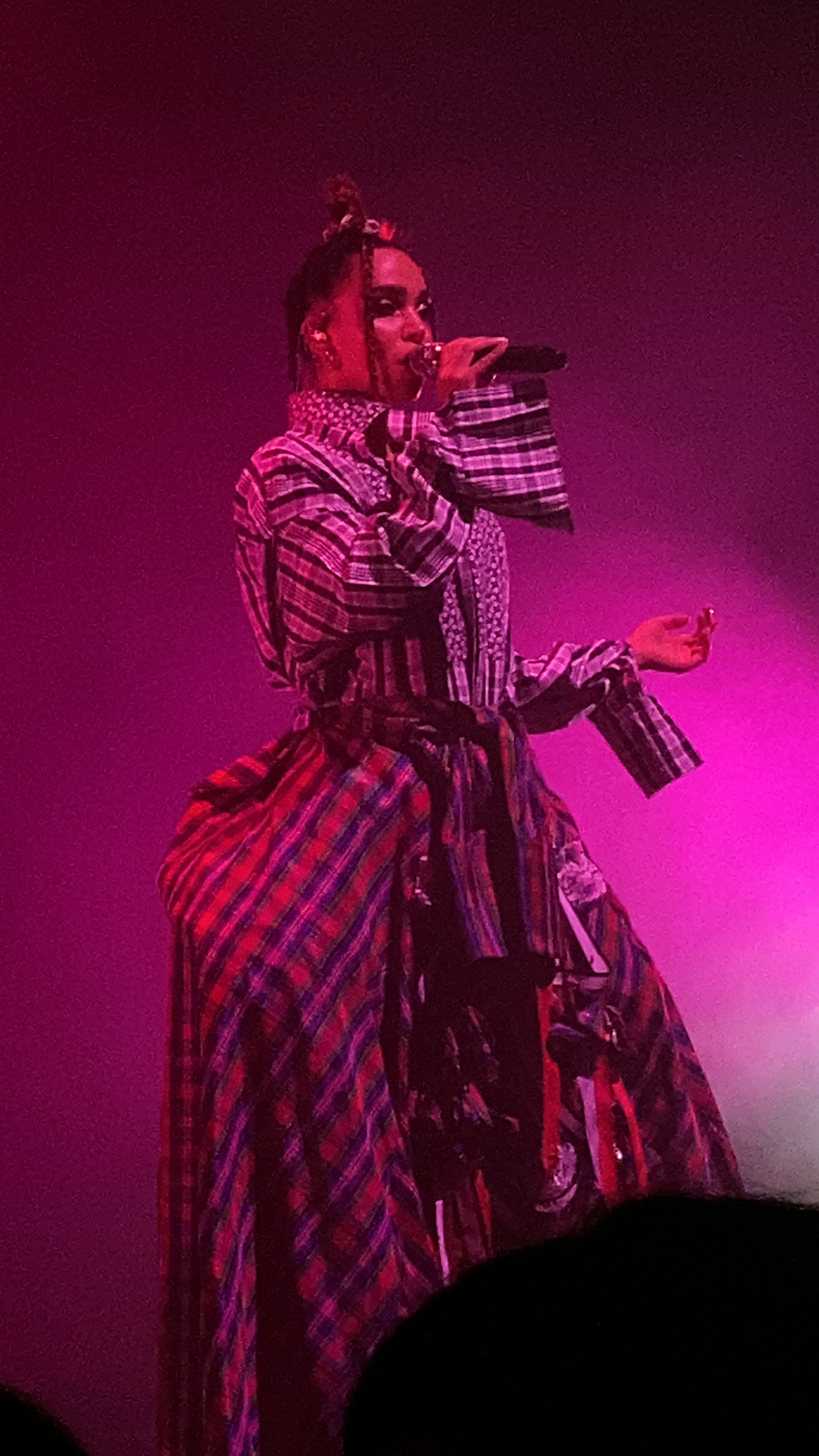
FKA Twigs performing in 2019

Barnett appeared on ASAP Rocky's album Testing in 2018, featuring on the track "Fukk Sleep". On 24 April 2019, she released the single "Cellophane", her first release since "Good to Love" in 2016. In September, Barnett announced that her second album, co-produced with Nicolas Jaar among others, would be titled Magdalene, supported by second single "Holy Terrain" (featuring Future) on 9 September. On 7 October, she released the third single, "Home with You", and announced that the album would be delayed until 8 November. The fourth single, "Sad Day", was released on 4 November.

Magdalene was released in November 2019. It received universal critical acclaim. The album ranked No. 1 on four year-end lists (The A.V. Club, Clash, Now, and Time) and in top-five of seven other lists. The same day, the film Honey Boy, in which Barnett played Shy Girl, had a commercial premiere. The film received positive reviews from critics. In 2020 she appeared in an OnlyFans-inspired music video for the song "Sum Bout U" with rapper 645AR. The video for "Sad Day", directed by Hiro Murai, premiered on 28 August. In September, Barnett received four nominations for the 2020 UK Music Video Awards, "Sad Day" won later the best cinematography in a video.

In October, Barnett took part in a virtual chat on the Grammy Museum's Programs at Home series. During the chat, she revealed that she was "just finishing" a new album that she made largely in collaboration with Spanish musician and producer el Guincho, and with other collaborators, many of whom she met for the first time via FaceTime calls. In November, British singer Dua Lipa hosted a live stream concert, titled Studio 2054, in which Barnett was invited to play as a guest. The two teased an upcoming collaboration, titled "Why Don't You Love Me", during Barnett's performance.

On 25 January 2021, Barnett announced the single "Don't Judge Me", featuring rapper Headie One and producer Fred Again, to be released the next day alongside a video co-directed by director Emmanuel Adjei and herself. The same day, she took part in a podcast episode with Louis Theroux and discussed her previous known relationships and an upcoming album, stating "It was all via the internet... I have more collaborations and features on this album than I ever had before." In February, she described the album as a "going out" record, and revealed it would feature collaborations with Nigerian Afrobeats musician Rema, British rapper Pa Salieu. A few days later, Barnett, interviewed by British actress and screenwriter Michaela Coel, revealed that she had changed the undisclosed, original title of the upcoming record due to a well-known artist titling a non-musical project the same thing. In an interview with Vogue in May, Barnett revealed the album does not have a set release date, but wanted to release it in the northern summer of 2021. In July 2021, Barnett directed the music video for Koreless' "White Picket Fence" single.

Barnett joined the FKA Twigs Discord server in September 2021 and shared details about the upcoming record. Barnett confirmed the project to be a mixtape, and listed el Guincho, Koreless, and Arca, as well as new collaborators American hip-hop producer Mike Dean and Canadian pop producer Cirkut, as producers for the project. She additionally teased a collaboration with Swedish rapper Yung Lean on Instagram.

Barnett released the single "Measure of a Man", featuring British rapper Central Cee, in November 2021, which appears as part of the film soundtrack for The King's Man. "Tears in the Club" featuring Canadian singer the Weeknd was released on 16 December. The song was her first release under Atlantic Records and served as the lead single from her mixtape, titled Caprisongs, which was released on 14 January 2022. Caprisongs also includes appearances from Pa Salieu, Daniel Caesar, Rema, Jorja Smith, Unknown T, Dystopia and Shygirl. Barnett was awarded Godlike Genius at the 2022 BandLab NME Awards in March, where she also performed "Meta Angel", and "Tears in the Club". She additionally featured on Yung Lean's Stardust album in April.

=== 2022–present: Eusexua and Eusexua Afterglow ===
FKA twigs performing at The LadyLand Festival, 2025

In June 2022 Barnett released "Killer". The song is about "the risks that you take for love" and how "the effects of heart break can define one's trajectory much more than the beauty of the love itself". Barnett debuted the song live during an NPR Tiny Desk Concert. The "Killer" music video, featuring Barnett performing choreography with Arón Piper on a beach in Portugal, was directed by Yoann Lemoine and released on 20 July 2022.

On 14 September 2023, Barnett performed a cover of Opus III's "It's a Fine Day" at Vogue World: London 2023, accompanied on stage by Cara Delevingne, whom she kissed, and members of the Rambert Dance Company. On 1 October, she introduced a new song titled "Unearth Her" with Koreless as part of a performance at the 2023 Valentino Women's Wear Spring/Summer 2024 Paris Fashion Week show. On 15 October, in a series of Instagram stories, the artist announced that eighty-five of her demo tracks had been leaked. She declared there would be "no new music for a while", postponing her third studio album. In January 2024, the UK Advertising Standards Authority banned a Calvin Klein advertisement that featured Barnett posing semi-nude, on the grounds that it framed her as a "stereotypical sexual object". Barnett defended the ad, saying that she is "proud of [her] physicality". In March 2024, the ASA revoked their ban, referencing the views of Barnett and the public, and "concern that our rationale for banning the ad was substantially flawed".

The title track for her third studio album, Eusexua, was released 13 September 2024. On 17 October, "Perfect Stranger" was released as the second single. A third single, "Drums of Death", released on 14 November with Koreless, with an accompanying highly choreographed music video in an office setting.

The lead single "Cheap Hotel", from the follow-up album Eusexua Afterglow was released on 26 September 2025 The album's second single, "Predictable Girl" was released on 11 November 2025. It was accompanied by a music video starring Barnett and Shivawn Joubert, directed by Jordan Hemingway.

Eusexua: Afterglow was released on 14 November 2025 through Young and Atlantic Records. The music video for the track "Hard", directed by Jordan Hemingway, was released on the same day.

== Musical style and influences ==
"Pendulum"
A 30-second sample of "Pendulum", displaying Twigs' art pop and R&B with snare rhythm and piano

Possessing a soprano vocal range, Barnett's music has been described as "genre-bending", drawing on a variety of styles, including electronic music, R&B, trip hop, choral music, industrial, and avant-garde. In her songs and music videos she incorporates elements of afrofuturism.

Her work has been compared to that of Tricky as well as Kate Bush, Janet Jackson, the xx, Massive Attack, and Madonna. Pitchfork writer Philip Sherburne compared her breathy vocals and the electronic production style of LP1 to Ciara, the Weeknd and Beyoncé. The Wall Street Journal described her as "an heir to futuristic R&B muses like Aaliyah, Missy Elliott and others under the progressive sway of producer Timbaland." Variety wrote that her music was "darkly avant-garde, aggressive and atmospheric", adding that her "scorched earth-soul of 2014's LP1 and 2019's Magdalene positioned her as a cross between Billie Holiday and Siouxsie and the Banshees", with a production style like Lee Scratch Perry's.

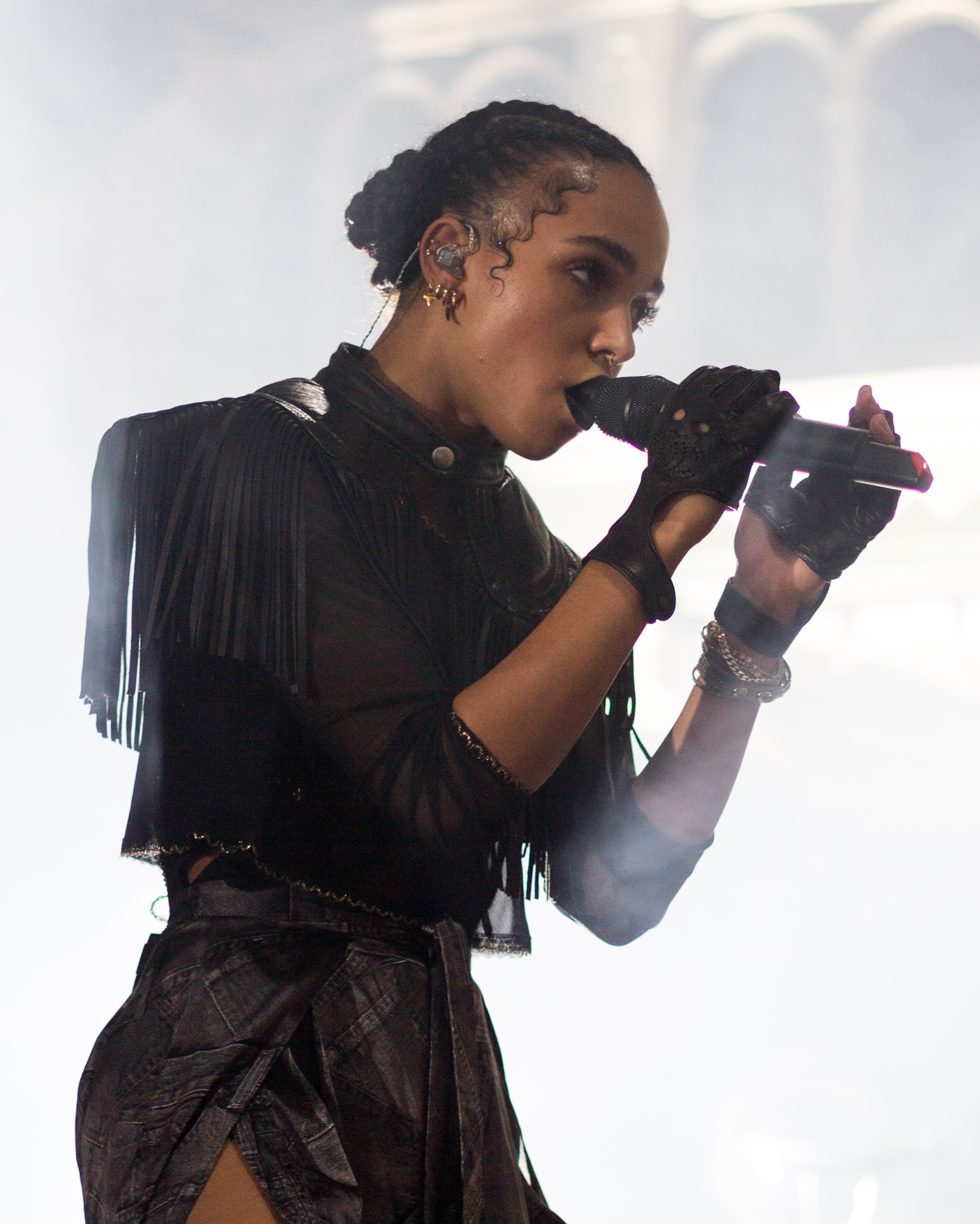
FKA Twigs performing in Paradiso, Amsterdam (2015)

According to Slate, "her sound is uniquely her own – melismatic falsetto over beats that are equal parts spooky and soothing". In 2020, The New York Times noted: "in recent years, Twigs, now 32, has begun to harness her pursuit of avant-garde innovation and technical virtuosity toward a deeper exploration of pain and insecurity", making wider comparisons to Janelle Monáe, Fiona Apple, Solange, and Lana Del Rey. In terms of her relationship to fame and adoption of different personae on the stage and in her music, Simon Critchley aligned her alongside David Bowie. Barnett said: "I am not restricted by any musical genre. I like to experiment with sounds, generating emotions while putting my voice on certain atmospheres ... I found my own way of playing punk. I like industrial sounds and incorporating everyday life's sounds like a car alarm." She has been associated with the alternative R&B tag, though she herself has rejected the R&B label as related to her race:

It's just because I'm mixed race. When I first released music and no one knew what I looked like, I would read comments like: 'I've never heard anything like this before, it's not in a genre.' And then my picture came out six months later, now she's an R&B singer. I share certain sonic threads with classical music; my song 'Preface' is like a hymn. So let's talk about that. If I was white and blonde and said I went to church all the time, you'd be talking about the 'choral aspect'. But you're not talking about that because I'm a mixed-race girl from south London.

The first singers who influenced Barnett were Billie Holiday, Ella Fitzgerald, and Marvin Gaye. When she started composing songs, she wanted to reproduce music she liked: "every bit of music that I made sounded like a pastiche of Siouxsie and the Banshees or Adam Ant. But through that I discovered myself." In an interview after being shortlisted for the 2014 Mercury Prize, Barnett cited Germfree Adolescents by X-Ray Spex as her favourite album of all time.

== Personal life ==
=== Health ===
Barnett had surgery to remove fibroid tumours from her uterus in December 2017. She described her experience as "living with a fruit bowl of pain every day" and saluted the bravery of other women living with the condition. In 2020, she adopted a vegan diet after discovering the consumption of animal products was likely exacerbating the symptoms of her condition.

=== Relationships ===
Barnett began dating English actor Robert Pattinson in 2014, and they became engaged before ending their relationship in mid-2017. After her interracial relationship with Robert Pattinson became public in 2014, Barnett denounced the hate speech and racist comments reportedly written by Pattinson's fans on her Twitter profile, stating in September of the same year that she felt "genuinely shocked and disgusted at the amount of racism that has been infecting my [Twitter] account".

Barnett met American actor Shia LaBeouf on the set of the film Honey Boy, and they dated from mid-2018 to mid-2019. She filed a lawsuit against him at Los Angeles Superior Court in December 2020, accusing him of sexual battery, assault, and infliction of emotional distress during their relationship. In his response, LaBeouf stated he had been "abusive" to himself and those around him "for years" and that he was "ashamed" and "sorry to those [he] hurt". He later denied all allegations made by Barnett. The lawsuit was expected to proceed to trial in September 2025. A joint settlement was reached in July 2025, and lawyers maintained that details would be confidential.

From 2020 to 2022, Barnett was in a relationship with English musician Matty Healy of the band the 1975. She provided the background vocals for the 1975's song "If You're Too Shy (Let Me Know)", and their relationship inspired Healy to write the song "I'm in Love with You".

As of 2023, Barnett is in a relationship with director and photographer Jordan Hemingway.

=== Activism ===
In 2022, Barnett signed the Musicians For Palestine pledge, refusing to perform in Israel following the 2021 Israel–Palestine crisis.

Barnett promoted a campaign by Sistah Space encouraging people to lobby their local MP to support Valerie's Law, which would introduce mandatory training for the police and other agencies when dealing with domestic abuse against Black women and girls.

In April 2024, Barnett testified before the United States Senate Judiciary Subcommittee on Intellectual Property, calling for regulations on deepfakes and artificial intelligence.

In July 2024, Barnett was one of the performers for the Artists for Aid Benefit Concert in London which raised funds for the Gaza Strip and Sudan.

== Discography ==
- LP1 (2014)
- Magdalene (2019)
- Eusexua (2025)
- Eusexua Afterglow (2025)

== Tours ==
- Magdalene Tour (2019)
- Eusexua Tour (2025)
- Body High Tour (2026)

== Filmography ==
Key
†	Denotes productions that have not yet been released

=== Film ===
Year	Title	Role	Notes
2015	M3LL155X	Director	Short film
2019	Honey Boy	Shy Girl	
2020	Sad Day	Swordswoman	Short film
2024	The Crow	Shelly Webster	
2025	The Carpenter's Son	The Mother	
2026	Mother Mary	Imogen	
2026	The Lonely Woman †		
TBA	Brighton Beach †	M	Post-production
TBA	Josephine Baker †	Josephine Baker	Filming

=== Television ===
Year	Title	Role	Notes
2022	RuPaul's Drag Race UK	Herself	Guest judge Series 4; Episode: "Yass-tonbury Festival"

=== Music videos ===
Title	Year	Artist(s)	Director(s)	Ref.
"Traktor"	2010	Wretch 32	Ben Newman	
"Do It like a Dude"	2010	Jessie J	Emil Nava	
"Price Tag"	2011	Jessie J	Emil Nava	
"You Need Me, I Don't Need You"	2011	Ed Sheeran	Emil Nava	
"Yeah Right"	2011	Dionne Bromfield	Emil Nava	
"Time to Dance"	2012	The Shoes	Daniel Wolfe	
