= Tears in the Club =

2021 single by FKA Twigs featuring the Weeknd

Single by FKA Twigs featuring the Weeknd

from the album Caprisongs
- Released: 16 December 2021
- Genre: R&B-pop; pop-trap
- Length: 3:16
- Label: Atlantic; Young
- Songwriters: Tahliah Barnett; Abel Tesfaye; Ali Tamposi; Henry Walter; Alejandra Ghersi; Pablo Díaz-Reixa
- Producers: Cirkut; Arca; El Guincho

FKA Twigs singles chronology
"Measure of a Man" (2021)	"Tears in the Club" (2021)	"Killer" (2022)

The Weeknd singles chronology
"La Fama" (2021)	"Tears in the Club" (2021)	"Poison" (2021)

Music video
- "Tears in the Club" on YouTube

"Tears in the Club" is a song by English singer-songwriter FKA Twigs featuring Canadian singer-songwriter the Weeknd. It was released on 16 December 2021, as the lead single from the former's first mixtape, Caprisongs (2022). The two artists wrote the song alongside Ali Tamposi and producers Cirkut, Arca, and el Guincho.

== Background and composition ==
"Tears in the Club" leans towards a more contemporary pop sound that strays away from the type of FKA Twigs' regular music, but "maintains the etherealness and distortion for which she's become known". The song has been described as a pop-trap and R&B-pop track that pairs "a booming dance floor beat and atmospheric synths" with Twigs and the Weeknd belting out lyrics "that are packed with heartache and angst". It interpolates the section of "@@@@@" known as "Phantasy", composed and performed by Arca. Twigs announced the release date of the single alongside a trailer video on 13 December 2021.

== Music video ==
A music video for the song premiered on 16 December 2021. It was directed by Amber Grace Johnson. It starts with FKA Twigs dancing in a nightclub with bright lights. Twigs walks down the street crying and is subsequently picked up by a group of dancers. She is then joined by the Weeknd and performs for him in a fish tank, who watches her in tears.

== Charts ==
Chart performance for "Tears in the Club"
Chart (2021–2022)	Peak position
Canada Hot 100 (Billboard)	79
New Zealand Hot Singles (RMNZ)	12
Portugal (AFP)	168
