= Caprisongs =

2022 mixtape by FKA Twigs

Mixtape by FKA Twigs
- Released: 14 January 2022
- Recorded: 2020–2021
- Genres: Pop; avant-pop
- Length: 48:10
- Labels: Young; Atlantic
- Producers: AoD; Arca; Bkay; Cirkut; Jonathan Coffer; Mike Dean; El Guincho; Warren Ellis; Fakeguido; FKA Twigs; Fred; Teo Halm; Jasper Harris; Felix Joseph; Koreless; Jonny Leslie; P2J; Psymun; JJ Scheff

FKA Twigs chronology
Magdalene (2019)	Caprisongs (2022)	Eusexua (2025)

Singles from Caprisongs
- 1. "Tears in the Club" Released: 16 December 2021

Caprisongs (stylised in all caps) is the debut mixtape by English singer-songwriter FKA Twigs. It was released on 14 January 2022 through Young and Atlantic Records. The mixtape features guest appearances from Pa Salieu, the Weeknd, Shygirl, Dystopia, Rema, Daniel Caesar, Jorja Smith, and Unknown T. The production is handled by el Guincho, who co-executive produced the mixtape alongside Twigs, as well as Arca, Cirkut, and Mike Dean, among others.

The mixtape was supported by one single, "Tears in the Club", which features The Weeknd, and one promotional single, "Jealousy", which features Rema.

== Background and promotion ==
In October 2020, FKA Twigs took part in a virtual chat on the Grammy Museum's Programs at Home series. During the chat, she revealed that she was "just finishing" a new album that she made largely in collaboration with el Guincho, and with other collaborators, many of whom she met for the first time via FaceTime calls. Later in November 2020, British singer Dua Lipa hosted a livestream concert, titled Studio 2054, in which Twigs was invited to play as a guest. The two teased an upcoming collaboration, titled "Why Don't You Love Me", during Twigs' performance.

On 25 January 2021, Twigs took part in a podcast episode with Louis Theroux and discussed her previous known relationships and an upcoming album, stating "It was all via the internet...I have more collaborations and features on this album than I ever had before." In February, she described the album as a "going out" record, and revealed it would feature collaborations with Nigerian Afrobeats star Rema, British hip-hop up-and-comer Pa Salieu. A few days later, Twigs, interviewed by British actress and screenwriter Michaela Coel, revealed that she had changed the undisclosed, original title of the upcoming record due to a well-known artist titling a non-musical project the same thing. In an interview with Vogue in May, Twigs revealed the album does not have a set release date, but wanted to release it in the northern summer of 2021.

Twigs joined the official FKA Twigs Discord server in September 2021, and shared details about the upcoming record. Twigs confirmed the project to be a mixtape, and listed el Guincho, Koreless, and Arca, as well as new collaborators, such as Cirkut, Mike Dean, as producers for the project. She additionally teased a collaboration with Swedish rapper Yung Lean on Instagram.

The lead single of the mixtape, "Tears in the Club", which features Canadian singer-songwriter the Weeknd, was released with a music video on 16 December 2021. The sole promotional single, "Jealousy", which features Nigerian singer Rema, was released on 13 January 2022, only one day prior to the release of the project. The mixtape marked her first release under Atlantic Records. The mixtape was officially announced on 7 January 2022, a week before the scheduled release date. Coinciding with the release of the mixtape on 14 January 2022, Twigs released a music video for "Ride the Dragon", which was a guerrilla dance video shot in Hackney, London. A number of other 'Caprivids' were released after this in the same style.

== Composition ==
Caprisongs is seen as a departure from Twigs' previous work and a shift towards less experimental and more mainstream sound. It is described as a pop and "unbridled" avant-pop music. Its lyrics are influenced by R&B and hip-hop, while its beats are influenced by trap, drum'n'bass, and dancehall. "Darjeeling" features "a skittering harp" which "becomes the basis for a banging grime beat". "Jealousy" contains elements of Afrobeats. The album features spoken word interludes from Twigs' friends and collaborators, and one featuring a fan ask about her unreleased Dua Lipa duet, "Why Don't You Love Me?"

== Critical reception ==
Professional ratings
Aggregate scores
Source	Rating
AnyDecentMusic?	7.7/10
Metacritic	80/100
Review scores
Source	Rating
AllMusic	4/5 stars
Clash	7/10
Evening Standard	4/5 stars
The Guardian	3/5 stars
The Independent	4/5 stars
The Line of Best Fit	7/10
NME	4/5 stars
The Observer	4/5 stars
Pitchfork	7.8/10
Rolling Stone	4/5 stars

Caprisongs was met with generally positive reviews from music critics. At Metacritic, which assigns a normalized rating out of 100 to reviews from professional publications, the album received an average score of 80, based on 17 reviews. Aggregator AnyDecentMusic? gave it 7.7 out of 10, based on their assessment of the critical consensus.

Helen Brown for The Independent called the mixtape "an often exquisitely crafted sequence of grooves" that's "elegantly laced together by [T]wigs's sad angel voice". Julyssa Lopez of Rolling Stone wrote, "The rawness of her previous work is part of what makes the unbridled avant pop on her new mixtape, Caprisongs, such an epic thrill. [...] Throughout her career, Twigs has morphed R&B wisps and electronic abstractions into highly visual concept art, and although the music on Caprisongs is her most buoyant, she doesn't sacrifice her creative nonconformity or intimacy." David Smyth of Evening Standard stated that "the tone on Caprisongs is predominantly bright and relaxed" and eventually concluded that, even though "she's closer to the mainstream pop world than ever before here", "it doesn't sound like a compromise. There's still plenty of sonic weirdness in the corners, and she's surely earned some time in the sun." Cat Zhang of Pitchfork thought the mixtape is a "playful and adventurous flex", writing that Caprisongs is the "sound of [T]wigs in the driver's seat as she traverses her own curiosities and instincts; [...] It is intrepid and light, the image of a woman attuned to planetary alignments but casting her own fate." Heather Phares from AllMusic claimed that, "Though Caprisongs nods to more mainstream sounds than her previous work, Barnett can still make any trend or genre her own."

Film producer and Sony studio executive Daniel de Boulay identified “minds of men” as a particular highlight, writing, “ Patriarchal culture teaches us to see sex as conquest, and for seventy years popular music has sung that lesson back to us. This song refuses it. Here sex is the place where a man is most exposed. I am moved by the honesty of that vulnerability, because as I grow older sex often frightens me far more than it excites me. So much can go wrong. Most of us were raised with wounded ideas about love and desire, and we carry those ideas into our most intimate moments. Too often we end up hurting the very people we most want to cherish.”

LaTesha Harris of NPR called the mixtape a "[t]riumphant and external [...] milestone of significant personal and professional transformation", but criticized the vocal manipulation as "too robotic", "specifically on 'Minds of Men' and 'Pamplemousse', [which sound] as if Amazon's Alexa downloaded poetry software and delivered the result on loop." Alex Rigotti of Clash highlighted the influence of Björk's 2001 album Vespertine, "whose microbeats, plucky harps and music boxes are scattered over various tracks", concluding that, "[w]hilst it's nice to hear a change of pace for [T]wigs (and to, on occasion, genuinely hear her laugh), there's not as much focus on experimentation and expression, which could disappoint some exacting fans." Alexis Petridis of The Guardian opined, "There's a lot that's laudable about Caprisongs. [...] But equally, it's something that ultimately impedes your enjoyment of the album. As a soundtrack for the start of a night, it doesn't quite pan out as you might hope."

Year-end lists
Publication	List	Rank	Ref.
A.V. Club	The 25 Best Albums of 2022	—N/a	
Billboard	The 50 Best Albums of 2022	25	
Clash	Clash's Albums of The Year	42	
Entertainment Weekly	The 10 Best Albums of 2022	3	
Esquire	The 25 Best Albums of 2022	—N/a	
Flood Magazine	The Best Albums of 2022	15	
GQ	The Best Albums of 2022	—N/a	
NPR	The 50 Best Albums of 2022	17	
Paste	The 50 Best Albums of 2022	43	
Pitchfork	The 50 Best Albums of 2022	24	
Rolling Stone	The 100 Best Albums of 2022	8	
Slant Magazine	The 50 Best Albums of 2022	4	

== Track listing ==
Caprisongs track listing
No.	Title	Writer(s)	Producer(s)	Length
1.	"Ride the Dragon"	FKA Twigs; Pablo Díaz-Reixa; Lewis Roberts; Mark Anthony Spears; Jeff Kleinman	El Guincho; Koreless; FKA Twigs^{[a]}; Sounwave^{[a]}; Kleinman^{[a]}	3:08
2.	"Honda" (featuring Pa Salieu)	FKA Twigs; Díaz-Reixa; Felix Joseph; Alastair O'Donnell; Pa Salieu Gaye; Colin Towns	El Guincho; AoD; Joseph	3:21
3.	"Meta Angel"	FKA Twigs; Díaz-Reixa; Roberts; Teo Lucas Halm	El Guincho; Halm; Koreless^{[a]}; FKA Twigs^{[a]}	4:19
4.	"Tears in the Club" (featuring the Weeknd)	FKA Twigs; Henry Russell Walter; Alejandra Ghersi; Díaz-Reixa; Ali Tamposi; Abel Tesfaye	Cirkut; Arca; El Guincho	3:16
5.	"Oh My Love"	FKA Twigs; Díaz-Reixa; Jason Jerry Scheff; Billy Walsh	JJ Scheff; El Guincho; Pau Riutort^{[b]}	3:45
6.	"Pamplemousse"	FKA Twigs; Díaz-Reixa; Halm	El Guincho; Halm^{[b]}; Koreless^{[b]}	1:38
7.	"Caprisongs Interlude" (featuring Solo)	FKA Twigs	Jonny Leslie; FKA Twigs	0:25
8.	"Lightbeamers"	FKA Twigs; Díaz-Reixa; Jasper Lee Harris	El Guincho; Harris; Marius de Vries^{[a]}; Koreless^{[b]}	3:31
9.	"Papi Bones" (featuring Shygirl)	FKA Twigs; Díaz-Reixa; Pablo Martinez Albroch; Jonathan Coffer; Amanda Ghost; Blane Muise	FKA Twigs; El Guincho; Fakeguido; Coffer; Koreless^{[b]}; Sega Bodega^{[c]}	3:40
10.	"Which Way" (featuring Dystopia)	FKA Twigs; Mike Dean; Tobias Jesso Jr.	Dean; Koreless^{[b]}	2:02
11.	"Jealousy" (featuring Rema)	FKA Twigs; Díaz-Reixa; Frederick John Philip Gibson; Divine Ikubor; Richard Isong	Fred; El Guincho; P2J; FKA Twigs^{[a]}; Koreless^{[b]}	2:39
12.	"Careless" (featuring Daniel Caesar)	FKA Twigs; Jesso; Simon Christiansen; Daniel Caesar	Psymun; El Guincho	3:36
13.	"Minds of Men"	FKA Twigs; Díaz-Reixa; Harris; Alexander Walter Bak	El Guincho; Harris; Bak^{[a]}; Fakeguido^{[b]}	3:24
14.	"Track Girl Interlude"	FKA Twigs; Warren Ellis; Roberts	Koreless; Ellis	1:42
15.	"Darjeeling" (featuring Jorja Smith and Unknown T)	FKA Twigs; Díaz-Reixa; Christiansen; Bryan Kabengele; Daniel Lena; Jorja Alice Smith; Timothy Kellet; Robin Taylor-Firth	El Guincho; Bkay; Psymun	3:03
16.	"Christi Interlude"	Roberts; Christi Meshell	Koreless	1:04
17.	"Thank You Song"	FKA Twigs; Ghersi; Jesso	Arca	3:28
Total length:				48:10

=== Notes ===
- ^{^[a]} signifies a co-producer
- ^{^[b]} signifies an additional producer
- ^{^[c]} signifies a drum producer
- All tracks are stylised in all lowercase.

=== Sample credits ===
- "Honda" contains elements from "Requiem" performed by Colin Towns.
- "Tears in the Club" contains elements of "Dawn" and "Phantasy", both composed and performed by Arca.
- "Darjeeling" contains an interpolation of "You're Not Alone", composed by Tim Kellett and Robin Taylor-Firth.

== Personnel ==
Credits are adapted from the album's liner notes and Tidal.

=== Musicians ===
- FKA Twigs – vocals (tracks 1–15, 17)
- Pa Salieu – featured vocals (2)
- Teo Halm – guitar, synthesizer (3, 6)
- Rob Moose – strings (3)
- Cirkut – drums, keyboards, programming, synthesizer (4)
- The Weeknd – featured vocals (4)
- Lous & The Yakuza – background vocals (5)
- Jemma Mayo – background vocals (5)
- Abigail Sakari – background vocals (5)
- Suzannah Pettigrew – background vocals (5)
- Sara El Dabi – background vocals (5)
- Alejandra Luisa Smits – background vocals (5)
- Matthew Healy – additional vocals (6)
- Louis – additional vocals (6)
- Solo – vocals (7)
- Dystopia – additional vocals (9), featured vocals (10)
- Kaner Flex – additional vocals (9)
- Movie Star Johnny – additional vocals (9)
- Sega Bodega – drum programming (9)
- Shygirl – featured vocals (9)
- Fred Again – drums, keyboards, bass, guitar, programming (11)
- Pau Riutort – guitar (12)
- Daniel Caesar – featured vocals (12)
- Fakeguido – bass (13)
- Irene Agbontean – vocals (14)
- Kash Powell – vocals (14)
- Roxy Lee – additional vocals (14)
- Tolani Shoneye – vocals (14)
- Jorja Smith – featured vocals (15)
- Unknown T – featured vocals (15)
- Christi Meshell – vocals (16)

=== Technical ===
- FKA Twigs – executive production
- El Guincho – executive production
- Jonny Leslie – engineering
- Shin Kamiyama – The Weeknd vocal engineering (4)
- Rob Drauden – Rema vocal recording (4)
- Riccardo Damian – Jorja Smith vocal recording (15)
- Joe LaPorta – mastering
- Mike Dean – mastering, mixing (1–3, 6–8, 10, 12–17)
- Serban Ghenea – mixing (4)
- Jaycen Joshua – mixing (5, 9, 11)
- Bryce Bordone – mix engineering (4)
- Jacob Richards – mixing assistance (5, 9, 11)
- Mike Seaberg – mixing assistance (5, 9, 11)
- DJ Riggins – mixing assistance (5, 9, 11)

== Charts ==
Chart performance for Caprisongs
Chart (2022)	Peak position
Australian Albums (ARIA)	65
Belgian Albums (Ultratop Flanders)	30
Belgian Albums (Ultratop Wallonia)	124
Canadian Albums (Billboard)	48
French Albums (SNEP)	126
Irish Albums (IRMA)	82
New Zealand Albums (RMNZ)	37
Scottish Albums (Official Charts)	23
Spanish Albums (Promusicae)	64
Swiss Albums (Schweizer Hitparade)	30
UK Albums (Official Charts)	42
UK Independent Albums (Official Charts)	8
US Billboard 200	91
US Top Alternative Albums (Billboard)	9
US Top Dance Albums (Billboard)	1
