= Eusexua =

Studio album by FKA Twigs
- Released: 24 January 2025
- Recorded: 2022–2024
- Genres: Avant-pop; club pop; techno
- Length: 42:58
- Language: English • Japanese
- Labels: Young; Atlantic
- Producers: Aod; Jeff Bhasker; Marius de Vries; Eartheater; FKA Twigs; Felix Joseph; Koreless; Ojivolta; Stuart Price; Sasha; Stargate; Tic

FKA Twigs chronology
Caprisongs (2022)	Eusexua (2025)	Eusexua Afterglow (2025)

Alternative cover
- Cover art for the November 2025 reissue

Singles from Eusexua
- 1. "Eusexua" Released: 13 September 2024; 2. "Perfect Stranger" Released: 17 October 2024; 3. "Drums of Death" Released: 14 November 2024; 4. "Childlike Things" Released: 27 March 2025; 5. "Perfectly" Released: 9 July 2025

Eusexua (/juːˈsɛk.ʃuː.ə/ yew-SEK-shoo-ə, stylised in all caps) is the third studio album by English singer FKA Twigs, released on 24 January 2025 through Young and Atlantic Records. It marks her first studio album in six years, following Magdalene (2019), and her first full body of work in over three years, following the mixtape Caprisongs (2022). It contains guest appearances from Koreless and North West; the latter performs in Japanese.

The album has received acclaim from music critics praising the production style, vocal performances, and songwriting. "Eusexua" is also the title track and lead single off the album, released 13 September 2024. "Perfect Stranger" and "Drums of Death" were the other two singles, released roughly a month apart. To promote the album, Twigs embarked on the Eusexua Tour in 2025. Eusexua earned her first Grammy Award for Best Dance/Electronic Album and received a nomination for the Mercury Prize.

The album was followed by a sequel, Eusexua Afterglow, on 14 November 2025. Afterglow was released alongside a reissue of Eusexua, which replaces four tracks with new recordings, including the single "Perfectly", and also includes a new version of the track "Striptease" featuring Eartheater.

== Background ==
On 15 March 2023, the then-unnamed track "Striptease" was used in a Calvin Klein advertising campaign, in which Twigs also appeared. On 1 October 2023, she performed in Valentino's show at Paris Fashion Week; the performance, entitled Unearth Her, included tracks recorded with longtime collaborator and producer Koreless for her then-upcoming album. According to Alex Rigotti of NME, the previewed songs "seemed to be influenced by thrumming techno and dreamy trance instrumentals".

Twigs first began teasing the album in January 2024 through a string of posts on her Discord. Having relocated to Prague "a couple summers" prior to work on The Crow (2024), she fell in love with techno; while she explained that the album would not consist of that genre but would bear its "spirit", and she described it as "deep but not sad". She further revealed that she had teamed up with electronic duo Two Shell who helped her craft the era from scratch after 85 of her demos were leaked in October 2023. In an interview with British Vogue in March 2024, she explained the meaning behind the word "eusexua", saying that she came up with it to describe the "sensation of being so euphoric" that one could "transcend human form". On 22 August 2024 on Jimmy Kimmel Live!, Twigs told the guest host RuPaul: "I'm obsessed with alternative cultures and subcultures, so to be somewhere brand new that I'd never been, that kind of amazing East Bloc techno warehouse raves, techno kids, I just couldn't resist."

North West features as a rapper on the track "Childlike Things", performing in English and Japanese.

== Release and promotion ==
Twigs premiered the "techno-inspired" album in its entirety at a New York City listening party on 20 August 2024. The intimate listening party took place on the Lower East Side of Manhattan that saw the singer wearing a brown corset top with brown boots and a brown wig in her hand. On 31 August, she shared a picture of a poster asking "Have you experienced eusexua?" with the title track released as the lead single on 13 September 2024. The album was set to be released on 24 January 2025 and it would contain 11 tracks. The "Eusexua" music video, directed by Jordan Hemingway, was released the same day as the single. The prelude of the video features a preview of another album track, "Drums of Death".

Soon after announcing the album, Twigs performed two unreleased tracks, entitled "Room of Fools" and "Girl Feels Good", live at an event hosted by On Running during London Fashion Week. On 17 October 2024, she released "Perfect Stranger" as the second single from the album. Its accompanying music video was released the same day; it was directed by Hemingway, and featured appearances from actress/writer Phoebe Waller-Bridge, fashion designer Mowalola Ogunlesi and musician Yves Tumor, among others. Twigs also threw 2 sets of Eusexua raves in promotion of her album. The first Eusexua raves happened in Los Angeles (partnering with Tunnel) and New York (partnering with Fantasy) in October 2024. "Drums of Death" was released as the third single on 14 November. Its instrumental was conceived by Koreless, who is featured on the song, on a flight to Berlin ahead of his performance at Berghain.

On 6 December, Anyma released his remix of "Eusexua". On 28 December, Twigs joined him on stage at the Sphere to perform the remix, while a video of herself dancing displayed on the LED screen above her. To support the album, the Eusexua Tour was announced on 16 January 2025. Twigs threw the second set of Eusexua raves in the weeks before and immediately after the release of her album, this time hosting the Eusexua raves in Los Angeles (partnering again with Tunnel), New York (partnering again with Fantasy), London (partnering with Wraith), Glasgow (partnering with Pony Boy), and Paris (partnering with Wraith).

=== Reissue ===
On 14 November 2025, alongside the release of the sequel album Eusexua: Afterglow, Twigs surprise released a reissue of the record, which includes the single "Perfectly" alongside a version of "Striptease" featuring Eartheater and three new tracks: "The Dare", "Got to Feel" and "Lonely but Exciting Road". "Girl Feels Good", "Perfect Stranger", "Wanderlust" and "Childlike Things" are omitted.

== Critical reception ==
Professional ratings
Aggregate scores
Source	Rating
AnyDecentMusic?	8.4/10
Metacritic	87/100
Review scores
Source	Rating
AllMusic	4.5/5 stars
The Arts Desk	3/5 stars
Consequence	A−
DIY	5/5 stars
The Independent	4/5 stars
The Line of Best Fit	8/10
NME	5/5 stars
Pitchfork	9.1/10; 8.0/10 (reissue)
Rolling Stone	4/5 stars
The Skinny	5/5 stars

Upon release, Eusexua was met with critical acclaim from music critics. According to the review aggregator Metacritic, Eusexua received "universal acclaim" based on a weighted average score of 87 out of 100 from 23 critic scores. Aggregator AnyDecentMusic? gave it 8.4 out of 10, based on their assessment of the critical consensus.

Reviewing the album for AllMusic, Heather Phares called it a collection "some of [FKA Twigs'] most physical, confessional, and empowering songs" and wrote that Twigs, "has guided listeners through a remarkably honest song cycle. The complexities are where her music thrives, and Eusexua abounds with them." In a five star review for The Skinny by Rhys Morgan, Eusexua was applauded for its concept demanding "both surrender and celebration; it doesn't just embrace the thrust of commercial dance, it subsumes it into the chromatic, honed prism of Twigs' artistry". Pitchfork's Rich Juzwiak gave the album notable praise, calling it a "masterful pop-star moment" and drawing comparisons to Madonna's Ray of Light and Disclosure's "You & Me".

Writing for NME, Aneesa Ahmed lauded Eusexua for being a "cohesive and transcendent artistic experience", while additionally noting that the production "rawly explores eroticism and the power of submission". A four star review by Julyssa Lopez in Rolling Stone noted a mashup of "techno beats, house production, and unforgiving industrial tones" on the album, and highlighted the track "Sticky" as a standout due to its similarities to Björk and Kate Bush vocal performances. Similarly, Helen Brown of The Independent commended the record's complexity, saying it is "a dialled-down bed of house beats, delicate synths and shimmering harps".

== Commercial performance ==
Eusexua debuted at number 24 on the US Billboard 200 and atop the Top Dance Albums selling 21,000 album-equivalent units in its first week.

== Accolades ==
On 10 September 2025, Eusexua was announced as one of 12 nominees for the 2025 Mercury Prize. It ultimately lost to Sam Fender's People Watching. Eusexua won Best Dance/Electronic Album at the 68th Annual Grammy Awards.

== Track listing ==
Standard edition
No.	Title	Lyrics	Music	Producer(s)	Length
1.	"Eusexua"	Tahliah Barnett; F. R. David	Barnett; Lewis Roberts; Alexandra Drewchin; Ethan P. Flynn	Koreless; FKA Twigs; Eartheater; Sasha^{[a]}; Bapari^{[a]}; Two Shell^{[a]}^{[b]}	4:24
2.	"Girl Feels Good"	Barnett; Fitoussi	Barnett; Roberts; Dougie F. Mark Williams; Raul Cubina; Alastair O'Donnell	Aod; FKA Twigs; Felix Joseph; Koreless; Marius de Vries; Ojivolta	3:56
3.	"Perfect Stranger"	Barnett	Barnett; Roberts; Williams; Mikkel S. Eriksen; Cubina; Tor Erik Hermansen	Koreless; Stargate; Ojivolta; FKA Twigs; Stuart Price^{[a]}	3:17
4.	"Drums of Death" (with Koreless)	Barnett	Tintin Freeman; Roberts; Kwon Ji-yong; Robin L. Cho	Koreless	3:11
5.	"Room of Fools"	Barnett	Barnett; Roberts; De Vries	FKA Twigs; Koreless	4:25
6.	"Sticky"	Barnett	Barnett; Roberts; Williams; Cubina; Jimmy Napes	FKA Twigs; Koreless; Jonny Leslie^{[a]}; Joseph^{[a]}; Ojivolta^{[a]}	2:57
7.	"Keep It, Hold It"	Barnett	Barnett; Roberts; Nico Jaar; De Vries	FKA Twigs; Koreless; De Vries^{[a]}; Jaar^{[a]}	4:32
8.	"Childlike Things" (with North West)	Barnett; West; Mike Chapman	Barnett; Simon Pilton; Jeff Bhasker; Roberts; De Vries; Williams; Cubina; Matteo Santini; Jack Benson; Patrick Lewis; Mikako "Meeka" Livingston	Koreless; Ojivolta; Bhasker^{[c]}; Korpse^{[a]}; Two Shell^{[a]}	2:30
9.	"Striptease"	Barnett	Barnett; Dylan Brady; Roberts; De Vries; Williams; Cubina	FKA Twigs; Koreless; De Vries; Ojivolta; Brady^{[a]}; Joseph^{[a]}	4:43
10.	"24hr Dog"	Barnett	Barnett; Flynn; Roberts; Williams; Cubina	Koreless; De Vries^{[a]}	4:41
11.	"Wanderlust"	Barnett; Amanda Ghost	Barnett; Roberts; Timmaz Zolleyn; Emile Haynie; Price; Williams; Cubina; Ed Thomas	FKA Twigs; Koreless; De Vries; Ojivolta; Price; Tic	4:17
Total length:					42:53

The Eleven edition
No.	Title	Length
12.	"The Eleven"	11:11
Total length:		54:04

Reissue
No.	Title	Lyrics	Music	Producer(s)	Length
1.	"Eusexua"	Tahliah Barnett; F. R. David	Barnett; Lewis Roberts; Alexandra Drewchin; Ethan P. Flynn	Koreless; FKA Twigs; Eartheater; Sasha^{[a]}; Bapari^{[a]}; Two Shell^{[a]}^{[b]}	4:24
2.	"Perfectly"	Barnett	Barnett; Amy Wadge; Flynn; Roberts; Xquisite Korpse	FKA Twigs; Maxx Morando; Xquisite Korpse; Koreless; Batu^{[a]}	3:51
3.	"The Dare"	Barnett	Barnett; Keith Tenniswood; Roberts; Sasha Skarbeck	FKA Twigs; Koreless; Leslie^{[a]}; Manni Dee^{[a]}; Yves Rothman^{[a]}	3:28
4.	"Drums of Death" (with Koreless)	Barnett	Tintin Freeman; Roberts; Kwon; Cho	Koreless	3:11
5.	"Room of Fools"	Barnett	Barnett; Roberts; De Vries	FKA Twigs; Koreless	4:25
6.	"Sticky"	Barnett	Barnett; Roberts; Williams; Cubina; Napes	FKA Twigs; Koreless; Leslie^{[a]}; Joseph^{[a]}; Ojivolta^{[a]}	2:57
7.	"Keep It, Hold It"	Barnett	Barnett; Roberts; Jaar; De Vries	FKA Twigs; Koreless; De Vries^{[a]}; Jaar^{[a]}	4:32
8.	"Got to Feel"	Barnett	Barnett; Joy Henson; Roberts; De Vries; Petra Levitt	FKA Twigs; Henson; Koreless; Levitt	3:31
9.	"Striptease" (featuring Eartheater)	Barnett	Barnett; Brady; Roberts; De Vries; Williams; Cubina	Eartheater; FKA Twigs; Koreless; De Vries; Ojivolta; Aod^{[a]}; Brady^{[a]}; Joseph^{[a]}	4:43
10.	"24hr Dog"	Barnett	Barnett; Flynn; Roberts; Williams; Cubina	Koreless; De Vries^{[a]}	4:41
11.	"Lonely but Exciting Road"	Barnett	Barnett; Roberts; Eriksen; Hermansen; Wesley Tyler Glass	FKA Twigs; Koreless; Stargate; Leslie^{[a]}; Dee^{[a]}	3:31
Total length:					43:14

Notes

- ^{^[a]} signifies an additional producer
- ^{^[c]} signifies a co-producer
- ^{^[b]} Two Shell is also credited as Joy Henson and Petra Levitt on different tracks.
- The version of "Striptease" that appears on vinyl and CD editions of the album has a different outro than that of the digital version.

Samples

- "Drums of Death" contains elements from "One of a Kind", composed by Kwon Ji-yong and Robin L. Cho, and performed by G-Dragon.

== Personnel ==
=== Musicians ===
- FKA Twigs – vocals
- Sasha - production (track 1)
- Tic – guitar (tracks 1, 3, 11)
- Eartheater – background vocals and guitar (track 1)
- Aod – guitar (track 3)
- TinTin – background vocals (track 4)
- Marius de Vries – strings arrangement, conductor (tracks 5, 9)
- Jonny Leslie – drums (track 6)
- Ben de Vries – additional drums (track 7)
- Nadine Marshall – choir, choir director (track 7)
- J'Danah Marshall – choir (track 7)
- Nathan Palmer – choir (track 7)
- Ruth Adebiyi – choir (track 7)
- Ryan Carty – choir (track 7)
- Kelly Moran – piano (track 7)
- Chris Ahn – cello (track 9)
- David Low – cello (track 9)
- Julie Jung – cello (track 9)
- Vanessa Freebairn-Smith – cello (track 9)
- Clemants – programming (track 9)
- Ben Jacobson – violin (track 9)
- Christian Hebel – violin (track 9)
- Eric Gorfain – violin (track 9)
- Eugenia Choi – violin (track 9)
- Luanne Homzy – violin (track 9)
- Mark Robertson – strings contractor & violin (track 9)
- Mina Hong – violin (track 9)
- Radu Pieptea – violin (track 9)
- Ethan P. Flynn – guitar (track 10)

=== Technical ===
- Dale Becker – mastering
- Manny Marroquin – mixing (tracks 1, 6, 7, 10, 11)
- Jon Castelli – mixing (tracks 2–5, 8, 9)
- Jonny Leslie – engineering (tracks 1, 5, 8–11)
- Joseph Hartwell Jones – engineering (tracks 1, 6, 7)
- Lewis Roberts – engineering (track 4)
- Falko Duczmal – engineering (track 5)
- Peter Walsh – engineering (track 7)
- Noah Madrid – engineering (track 8)
- Brad Lauchert – mix engineering (tracks 2–5, 8, 9)
- Katie Harvey – mastering assistance
- Noah McCorkle – mastering assistance
- Anthony Vilchis – mixing assistance (tracks 1, 6, 7, 10, 11)
- Trey Station – mixing assistance (tracks 1, 6, 7, 10, 11)
- Zach Pereyra – mixing assistance (tracks 1, 6, 7, 10, 11)

== Charts ==
Chart performance for Eusexua
Chart (2025)	Peak position
Australian Albums (ARIA)	59
Austrian Albums (Ö3 Austria)	20
Belgian Albums (Ultratop Flanders)	16
Belgian Albums (Ultratop Wallonia)	22
Canadian Albums (Billboard)	42
Croatian International Albums (HDU)	8
Dutch Albums (Album Top 100)	32
Finnish Albums (Suomen virallinen lista)	34
French Albums (SNEP)	67
German Albums (Offizielle Top 100)	37
Greek Albums (IFPI)	78
Hungarian Albums (MAHASZ)	29
Irish Albums (Official Charts)	28
Irish Independent Albums (IRMA)	4
Japanese Digital Albums (Oricon)	44
Lithuanian Albums (AGATA)	36
New Zealand Albums (RMNZ)	21
Polish Albums (ZPAV)	52
Scottish Albums (Official Charts)	4
Swiss Albums (Schweizer Hitparade)	13
UK Albums (Official Charts)	3
UK Dance Albums (Official Charts)	1
UK Independent Albums (Official Charts)	1
US Billboard 200	24
US Top Dance Albums (Billboard)	1

== See also ==
- List of 2025 albums
- List of UK Dance Albums Chart number ones of 2025
- List of UK Independent Albums Chart number ones of 2025
- List of UK top-ten albums in 2025
