= Koreless =

British electronic musician

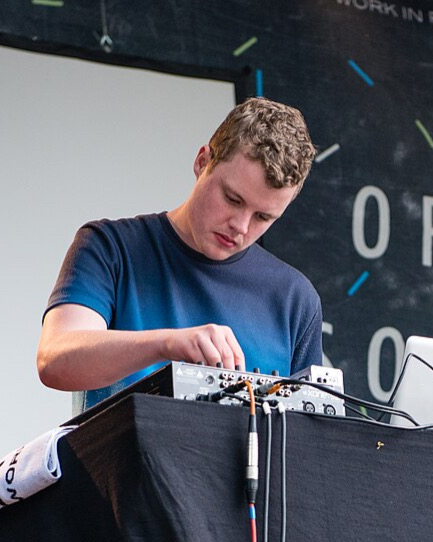
- Roberts in 2014

Background information
- Born: Lewis John Aelwyn Roberts; 1993 or 1994 (age 32–33)
- Origin: Bangor, Wales
- Genres: Electronic
- Occupations: Electronic music producer; DJ
- Years active: 2010–present
- Labels: Young; XL; VASE; Pictures

Lewis John Aelwyn Roberts (born 1993 or 1994), better known by the stage name Koreless, is a Welsh electronic musician, DJ and producer. He released his debut album, Agor, in 2021. He won the Grammy Award for Best Dance/Electronic Album as a producer of FKA Twigs' album Eusexua.

== History ==
Roberts was born in Wales and spends the majority of his time in Glasgow. In 2011, Koreless released his debut EP, 4D, on Pictures Music as a limited edition 12-inch single. In July 2012, he released single "Lost In Tokyo" on Jacques Greene's record label, Vase Records. He was invited to participate in the 2012 Red Bull Music Academy Summit in New York City.

Koreless worked with London-based producer and vocalist Sampha in 2012 to form collaborative works under the name of Short Stories. The pair premiered their track "Let It Go" in a short DJ set for Boiler Room TV in December of that year. This was released with second track, "On The Way", in January 2013 on Young Turks (now known simply as Young). Koreless' second EP, Yügen, was released in 2013 on Young Turks. The original EP announcement was accompanied by the release of supporting single, "Sun". Another track from this EP, "Never", was featured in director Jason Reitman's 2014 film, Men, Women & Children.

In December 2013, Koreless officially signed to Young Turks. He later appeared on a track from labelmate SBTRKT's second studio album, Wonder Where We Land.

== Live ==
After signing for Young Turks, Koreless was featured in a label showcase on BBC Radio 1 broadcast live at Maida Vale Studios in London with a live string quartet. During January 2014, Koreless supported Scottish band Mogwai during UK dates at the Royal Festival Hall at the Southbank Centre in London. Koreless performed his set with a string trio composed of double bass, cello and violin. Koreless had his live Australian debut in May 2014 as part of a line up for Sydney record label Future Classic's now yearly studio party at Sydney's Vivid Festival.

He supported Caribou on his 2015 European and North American live tour. On 9 April 2015, Koreless played alongside fellow electronic artists and composers James Holden and Luke Abbott in a show at the Barbican Centre to pay homage to the work and influence of electronic pioneer and minimalist composer Terry Riley. In 2023, Koreless produced the music for Sharon Eyal, in her piece Into the Hairy.

== Discography ==
=== Studio albums ===
- Agor (2021)

=== EPs ===
- 4D (2011)
- Yügen (2013)

=== Singles ===
- "Up Down Up Down" (2011)
- "Lost in Tokyo" (2012)
- "On the Way / Let It Go" (2013 as Short Stories with Sampha)
- "Sun" (2013)
- "TT / Love" (2015)
- "Black Rainbow / Moonlight" (2021)
- "Seven" (2024)

=== Production discography and credits ===
| Title | Year | Artist(s) | Album | Role | Co-writer(s) | Co-producer(s) |
|---|---|---|---|---|---|---|
| "On The Way" | 2012 | Short Stories | On The Way / Let It Go | Main artist/Co-writer/Co-producer | Sampha | Sampha |
| "Let It Go" | 2012 | Short Stories | On The Way / Let It Go | Main artist/Co-writer/Co-producer | Sampha | Sampha |
| "Arrow(s)" | 2013 | Szjerdene | Non-album single | Producer | — | Jacques Greene |
| "I Dated a Ghost 1nce" | 2013 | Super Helpful Kwame | SoBer | Co-writer/producer | Kwame Edwards | — |
| "The Exception to the Rule Has Taken Offense" | 2013 | Super Helpful Kwame | SoBer | Co-writer/producer | Kwame Edwards | — |
| "Osea" | 2014 | SBTRKT | Wonder Where We Land | Featured artist/Co-writer/Synthesizers | SBTRKT | — |
| "Every Day Is a Miracle" | 2018 | David Byrne | American Utopia | Drums | — | — |
| "Sad Day" | 2019 | FKA Twigs | Magdalene | Co-writer/additional producer | FKA Twigs, Benny Blanco, Cashmere Cat, Nicolas Jaar, Skrillex, Noah Goldstein | FKA Twigs, Benny Blanco, Nicolas Jaar, Skrillex, Cashmere Cat (add.), Noah Goldstein (add.) |
| "Holy Terrain" (featuring Future) | 2019 | FKA Twigs | Magdalene | Co-writer/additional producer | FKA Twigs, Future, Jack Antonoff, Sounwave, Skrillex, Poo Bear, Petar Lyondev | FKA Twigs, Jack Antonoff, Skrillex, Sounwave (add.), Kenny Beats (add.) |
| "Mary Magdalene" | 2019 | FKA Twigs | Magdalene | Additional producer | — | FKA Twigs, Benny Blanco, Nicolas Jaar, Cashmere Cat (add.), Noah Goldstein (add.) |
| "Mirrored Heart" | 2019 | FKA Twigs | Magdalene | Co-writer/producer | FKA Twigs, Ethan P. Flynn, Cy An | FKA Twigs |
| "No Kink In the Wire" | 2021 | Cosha | Mt. Pleasant | Producer | — | Cosha, JATA, Johan Hugo |
| "Lapdance from Asia" (featuring Shygirl) | 2021 | Cosha | Mt. Pleasant | Producer | — | Cosha, Mura Masa, Brett "123" Shaw, Zack Sekuler |
| all tracks | 2021 | Koreless | Agor | Main artist/writer/producer | — | Rodaidh McDonald (add.) |
| "Ride the Dragon" | 2022 | FKA Twigs | Caprisongs | Co-writer/producer | FKA Twigs, El Guincho, Sounwave, Jeff Kleinman | El Guincho, FKA Twigs (co.), Sounwave (co.), Jeff Kleinman (co.) |
| "Meta Angel" | 2022 | FKA Twigs | Caprisongs | Co-writer/co-producer | FKA Twigs, El Guincho, Teo Halm | El Guincho, Teo Halm, FKA Twigs (co.) |
| "Pamplemousse" | 2022 | FKA Twigs | Caprisongs | Additional producer | — | El Guincho, Teo Halm (add.) |
| "Lightbeamers" | 2022 | FKA Twigs | Caprisongs | Additional producer | — | El Guincho, Jasper Lee Harris, Marius de Vries (co.) |
| "Papi Bones" (featuring Shygirl) | 2022 | FKA Twigs | Caprisongs | Additional producer | — | FKA Twigs, El Guincho, Fakeguido, Jonny Coffer, Sega Bodega (drum) |
| "Which Way" (featuring Dystopia) | 2022 | FKA Twigs | Caprisongs | Additional producer | — | Mike Dean |
| "Jealousy" (featuring Rema) | 2022 | FKA Twigs | Caprisongs | Additional producer | — | FRED, El Guincho, P2J, FKA Twigs (co.) |
| "Track Girl Interlude" | 2022 | FKA Twigs | Caprisongs | Co-writer/producer | FKA Twigs, Warren Ellis | Warren Ellis |
| "Christi Interlude" | 2022 | FKA Twigs | Caprisongs | Co-writer/producer | Christi Meshell | — |
| "Eusexua" | 2024 | FKA Twigs | Eusexua | Producer | — | FKA Twigs, Eartheater, Sasha (add.), Bapari (add.), Two Shell (add.) |
| "Perfect Stranger" | 2024 | FKA Twigs | Eusexua | Producer | — | Stargate, Ojivolta, FKA Twigs, Stuart Price (add.) |
| "Drums of Death" | 2024 | FKA Twigs | Eusexua | Producer | — | — |
| "Girl Feels Good" | 2025 | FKA Twigs | Eusexua | Producer | — | Aod, FKA Twigs, Felix Joseph, Marius de Vries, Ojivolta |
| "Perfect Stranger" | 2025 | FKA Twigs | Eusexua | Producer | — | Stargate, Ojivolta, FKA Twigs, Stuart Price (add.) |
| "Room of Fools" | 2025 | FKA Twigs | Eusexua | Producer | — | FKA Twigs |
| "Sticky" | 2025 | FKA Twigs | Eusexua | Producer | — | FKA Twigs, Jonny Leslie (add.), Joseph (add.), Ojivolta (add.) |
| "Keep It, Hold It" | 2025 | FKA Twigs | Eusexua | Producer | — | FKA Twigs, De Vries (add.), Jaar (add.) |
| "Childlike Things" (with North West) | 2025 | FKA Twigs | Eusexua | Producer | — | Bhasker, Ojivolta, Korpse (add.) |
| "Striptease" | 2025 | FKA Twigs | Eusexua | Producer | — | FKA Twigs, De Vries, Ojivolta, Brady (add.), Joseph (add.) |
| "24hr Dog" | 2025 | FKA Twigs | Eusexua | Producer | — | De Vries |
| "Wanderlust" | 2025 | FKA Twigs | Eusexua | Producer | — | FKA Twigs, De Vries, Ojivolta, Price, Tic |
| "Perfectly" | 2025 | FKA Twigs | Eusexua | Producer | — | FKA Twigs, Maxx Morando, Xquisite Korpse, Batu (add.) |
| "The Dare" | 2025 | FKA Twigs | Eusexua | Producer | — | FKA Twigs, Leslie (add.), Manni Dee (add.), Yves Rothman (add.) |
| "Got to Feel" | 2025 | FKA Twigs | Eusexua | Producer | — | FKA Twigs, Henson, Levitt |
| "Striptease" (featuring Eartheater) | 2025 | FKA Twigs | Eusexua | Producer | — | Eartheater, FKA Twigs, De Vries, Ojivolta, Aod (add.), Brady (add.), Joseph (add.) |
| "Lonely but Exciting Road" | 2025 | FKA Twigs | Eusexua | Producer | — | FKA Twigs, Stargate, Leslie (add.), Dee (add.) |
