= Young (record label) =

British independent record label

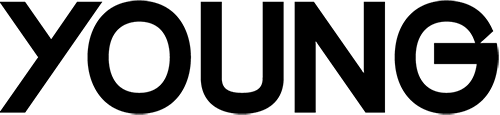
- Parent company: Beggars Group
- Founded: 2006
- Founder: Caius Pawson
- Distributors: Beggars Group via; Redeye Distribution (USA); PIAS (Europe); Atlantic Records (FKA twigs releases); Beat Records (Japan)
- Country of origin: United Kingdom
- Location: East London, England
- Official website: y-o-u-n-g.com

Young (formerly known as Young Turks) is a British independent record label that sits in the Beggars Group of labels launched by Caius Pawson in 2006. It has grown from an imprint of XL Recordings into a successful and influential label now partnered with XL and operates across a range of genres. The label's current roster includes the xx, FKA twigs, Sampha, Jamie xx, Koreless, Kamasi Washington, and John Maus.

== History ==
In 2004, Caius Pawson supplied DJs and sound equipment for a series of all-night dance parties he called Young Turks. He enjoyed growing celebrity, until the police raided one of his parties and seized his gear. Pawson, then nineteen, took a job in A&R at XL Recordings, and quickly established his own small label within the company in 2006, also called Young Turks with Katie O'Neill and Tic.

Eventually, Young became a 50/50 venture with XL Recordings. Young has now expanded to include an artist management company (Young Artists) and a publishing company (Young Songs).

In 2009, Young Turks released the xx's debut album, xx, which was awarded the Mercury Prize in 2010.

=== Name change ===
Pawson changed the name of the label from Young Turks to simply Young in April 2021. Pawson said he had named the label after the 1981 Rod Stewart song "Young Turks" and a British slang term for rebellious youth, but had been unaware of the early 20th century political movement that had originated the term and which had been involved with the Armenian genocide. Pawson wrote on Instagram "Through ongoing conversations and messages that have developed our own knowledge around the subject, it's become apparent that the name is a source of hurt and confusion for people. We loved the name for what it meant to us, but in retrospect should have listened more carefully to other voices and acted more quickly. We have always tried to affect positive change and knowing what we do now, it's only right that we change our name." Young announced they had made a donation of an undisclosed sum to the Armenian Institute in London in conjunction with the name change.

== Alumni ==
=== Current ===
==== Young Recordings ====
- Daniela Lalita
- Erykah Badu & The Alchemist
- Ethan P. Flynn
- FKA twigs
- Jamie xx
- John Glacier
- John Maus
- Kamasi Washington
- Koreless
- Mechatok
- Oliver Sim
- Robyn
- Romy
- Sampha
- The xx

==== Young Artists ====
- Ethan P. Flynn
- James William Blades
- Jamie xx
- Koreless
- Oliver Sim
- Robyn
- Romy
- Sampha
- The xx

==== Young Songs ====
- Arlo Parks
- Bkay
- Cadenza
- Dean Blunt
- Dove Ellis
- Fred Macpherson
- Holly Fletcher (Låpsley)
- Koreless
- Kwes Darko
- Oscar Scheller
- Sampha
- Taylor Skye

=== Former ===
- 1010 Benja SL
- Amnesia Scanner
- The Barker Band
- Broken Records
- Bullion
- Celebration
- Chairlift
- Creep
- Dog Bite
- El Guincho
- Gang Gang Dance
- Ging
- Glasser
- Holy Fuck
- Illum Sphere
- Jack Peñate
- Jessie Ware
- John Talabot
- Kid Harpoon
- Kwes
- Mustafa
- NoLife
- Pional
- Quirke
- Sbtrkt
- Short Stories (Koreless and Sampha)
- South Central
- Spacek
- Tanlines
- The Haxan Cloak
- Treanne
- TTY
- Wavves
- White Rabbits

== AD 93 ==
AD 93 is a record label affiliated with Beggars Group, headed by DJ Nic Tasker. Originally formed as a white label imprint for artists on Young (formerly Young Turks, YT) under the name 'Whities', this imprint grown into a label initially focusing on club and techno music to alternative and experimental music. in June 2020, this label's name changed to 'AD 93' in light of the 2020 Black Lives Matter uprisings. The label also launched a sub-label in 2021 named Lith Dolina.

=== Notable artists ===
- TSVI aka Annunaku
- Avalon Emerson
- Biosphere
- Christoph De Babalon
- Coby Sey
- Damsel Elysium
- IVVVO
- feeo
- james K
- Joanne Robertson
- Lanark Artefax
- Loraine James
- Minor Science
- Martha Skye Murphy
- Olof Dreijer
- Overmono
- Purple Pilgrims
- Quirke
- Moin (Raime & Valentina Magaletti)
- Reckonwrong
- Venux Ex Machina
- Wojciech Rusin
- YHWH Nailgun

== Discography ==
=== Selected releases on Young ===
- YT001: Jack Penate – Second, Minute or Hour (2006)
- YT006: Holy Fuck – LP (2007)
- YT013: El Guincho – Alegranza (2008)
- YT031: The xx – xx (2009)
- YT033: Holy Fuck – Latin (2010)
- YT045: Kwes – No Need To Run (2010)
- YT047: El Guincho – Pop Negro (2010)
- YT060: SBTRKT – SBTRKT (2011)
- YT072: Chairlift – Something (2012)
- YT080: The xx – Coexist (2012)
- YT087: Sampha – Dual (2013)
- YT088: Koreless – Yügen (2013)
- YT098: FKA twigs – EP2 (2013)
- YT109: Sampha – Too Much / Happens (2013)
- YT118: FKA twigs – LP1 (2014)
- YT120: SBTRKT – Wonder Where We Land (2014)
- YT122: Jamie xx – In Colour (2015)
- YT141: FKA twigs – M3LL155X (2015)
- YT158: Sampha – Process (2017)
- YT161: The xx – I See You (2017)
- YT171: Kamasi Washington – Harmony of Difference (2017)
- YT176: Kamasi Washington – Heaven and Earth (2018)
- YT191: FKA twigs – MAGDALENE (2019)
- YT214: Koreless – Agor (2021)
- YO258: Daniela Lalita – Trececerotres (2022)
- YO260: Ethan P. Flynn – Universal Deluge (2022)
- YO274: FKA twigs – Caprisongs (2022)
- YO283: Oliver Sim – Hideous Bastard (2022)
- YO312: Sampha – Lahai (2022)
- YO320: Romy – Mid Air (2022)
- YO322: Ethan P. Flynn – Abandon All Hope (2022)
- YO350: Kamasi Washington – Fearless Movement (2024)
- YO356: Jamie xx – In Waves (2024)
- YO381: FKA twigs – EUSEXUA (2025)
- YO387: John Glacier – Like A Ribbon (2025)
- YO429: Mechatok - Wide Awake (2025)

== See also ==
- XL Recordings
- List of record labels
- List of electronic music record labels
- List of independent UK record labels
