= List of music artists and bands from London =

London has contributed much to the history and development of popular music, from the British Rock revolution of the 1960s to the punk rock explosion of the 1970s to the underground electronic and dance sounds of recent years. The city is often cited as the birthplace of classic rock and the popular music industry. Several genres of rock and pop originated in London throughout the 1960s to the 1990s including British blues, psychedelia, mod, prog, glam, hard rock, punk rock, New Romantic and Britpop. This page includes bands formed and based in London. Below is a list of music artists and bands from London. These are separated by genre. For Drum and Bass and UK Funky House, there are separate entries on Wikipedia.

== Pop ==
- Adele
- Zak Abel
- Adam Ant
- All Saints
- Another Level
- Bananarama
- Breathe
- Chad and Jeremy
- Chas & Dave
- Childhood
- Phil Collins
- Culture Club
- The Dream Academy
- East 17
- David Essex
- Adam Faith
- Climie Fisher
- Five (stylised as 5ive)
- Five Star
- Samantha Fox
- Nick Gilder
- Girls Aloud
- Haircut 100
- Hot Chocolate
- Murray Head
- Elton John
- Jonathan King
- Level 42
- Leona Lewis
- Liberty X
- Dua Lipa
- Laurie London
- George Michael
- Hayley Mills
- Matt Monro
- Naked Eyes
- The New Vaudeville Band
- One Direction
- Peter and Gordon
- Cliff Richard (born in India)
- Julie Rogers
- The Rubettes
- Hurricane Smith
- Spandau Ballet
- Spice Girls
- Steps
- The Style Council
- The Tourists
- Wham!
- Wang Chung
- Jessie Ware
- Kim Wilde
- Zola Blood

== Rock ==
- AC/DC (Formed in 1973 in Sydney, Australia, they were largely based in London from 1976)
- Ace
- After the Fire
- America (members from America, band formed in London)
- The Animals (originally formed in Newcastle in 1962, relocated to London in 1964)
- Argent
- Asia
- Atomic Rooster
- The Beatles (formed in Liverpool in 1960, relocated to London in 1963, helped establish the city's early rock sound)
- David Bowie
- The Crazy World Of Arthur Brown
- Bad Company
- The Blockheads (also known as Ian Dury & The Blockheads)
- The Boomtown Rats (originally formed in Dublin in 1975, relocated to London in 1976)
- Bush
- Dave Clark Five
- Coldplay
- Cream
- Curved Air
- Cutting Crew
- Deep Purple
- Derek And The Dominos (with American members)
- Dire Straits
- Doctor And The Medics
- Emerson, Lake & Palmer
- Faces
- Fairport Convention
- Foghat
- Foreigner (partly formed in London, founded by English musicians with American members)
- Marianne Faithfull
- Fleetwood Mac (with American members)
- Free
- Genesis
- The Groundhogs
- Gryphon
- Hawkwind
- The Honeycombs
- Iron Maiden
- Island of Love
- The Jeff Beck Group
- Jethro Tull (originally formed in Blackpool in 1967 and relocated to London the same year)
- The Jimi Hendrix Experience (English-American band)
- King Crimson
- The Kinks
- Led Zeppelin
- Manfred Mann
- Marillion
- John Mayall & the Bluesbreakers
- The Moody Blues (formed in Birmingham in 1964, based in London)
- Motörhead
- Mott The Hoople (formed in Hereford in 1969, based in London)
- Mud
- The Outfield
- The Alan Parsons Project
- The Kut
- Pink Fairies
- Pink Floyd
- The Police
- The Pretenders (English-American rock band, Chrissie Hynde born in Akron, Ohio)
- Pretty Things
- Procol Harum
- The Quireboys
- Queen
- The Rolling Stones
- Skunk Anansie
- Small Faces
- Status Quo
- Strawbs
- Squeeze
- Rainbow
- Rod Stewart
- Roxy Music
- The Shadows
- Slash (born in London)
- Supertramp
- The Sweet (also known as Sweet)
- T. Rex
- Thin Lizzy (originally formed in Dublin in 1969, relocated to London in 1970)
- Tom Robinson Band
- Thunder
- UFO
- Uriah Heep
- Whitesnake
- Paul Weller
- The Who
- The Yardbirds
- Yes
- Young Guns
- The Zombies

== Famous London-born or -based guitarists ==
- Jeff Beck (member of The Yardbirds, Beck was the founder of the London rock band, The Jeff Beck Group)
- Ritchie Blackmore (grew up in Heston, Blackmore was a London-based session guitarist and co-founder and lead guitarist of the rock bands Deep Purple and Rainbow)
- Marc Bolan (founding member of the London band, T. Rex and pioneer of the glam rock movement)
- David Bowie (guitarist, singer-songwriter and pioneer of the glam rock and punk movements)
- Jonny Buckland (guitarist, songwriter and co-founder of Coldplay, born in Islington and raised in Pantymwyn, Wales)
- Eric Clapton (member of the London rock bands Cream, The Yardbirds and Derek And The Dominos)
- Ray Davies (lead guitarist of the London rock band, The Kinks)
- Peter Frampton (Guitarist, singer and songwriter born in London)
- David Gilmour (lead guitarist of Pink Floyd, born in Cambridge)
- Peter Green (blues guitarist born in London and co-founder of London band, Fleetwood Mac)
- Steve Hackett (lead guitarist of Genesis from 1971-1977)
- Jimi Hendrix (born in Seattle, career took off in London and he founded the London-based rock band, The Jimi Hendrix Experience)
- Steve Howe (lead guitarist of the London progressive rock band, Yes)
- Mick Jones (lead guitarist of the London punk band, The Clash)
- Mick Jones (founder and lead guitarist of the rock band, Foreigner)
- Steve Jones (lead guitarist of the London punk band, The Sex Pistols)
- Mark Knopfler (lead guitarist of London rock band, Dire Straits)
- Paul Kossoff (lead guitarist of the London hard rock band, Free)
- Hank Marvin (lead guitarist of the London rock band, The Shadows)
- Brian May (lead guitarist and founding member of London rock band, Queen)
- Jimmy Page (London born and based guitarist and member of London blues rock group, The Yardbirds and founding member of the rock band, Led Zeppelin)
- Andy Powell (Guitarist and founder of 70's hard rock band, Wishbone Ash)
- Slash (lead guitarist of American rock band, Guns 'N' Roses, born in London)
- Steve Marriott (London born and based guitarist of rock bands Small Faces and Humble Pie)
- Keith Richards (lead guitarist of London rock band, The Rolling Stones)
- Mike Rutherford (guitarist and founding member of the London rock band, Genesis)
- Pete Townshend (lead guitarist of London rock band, The Who)
- Paul Weller (guitarist and founding member of the bands, The Jam and the Style Council)
- Ronnie Wood (member of The Rolling Stones, The Faces and the Jeff Beck Group)

== Alternative rock ==
- Antlered Man
- Bastille
- Beady Eye
- Big Audio Dynamite
- The Big Moon
- Bloc Party
- The Bluetones
- Blur
- Kate Bush
- Elvis Costello
- Dodgy
- Elastica
- The Escape Club
- Fightstar
- The Fixx
- Florence and the Machine
- Gay Dad
- Ian Gomm
- Jamie T
- Jesus Jones
- JoBoxers
- Klaxons
- Kula Shaker
- The Last Dinner Party
- The Libertines
- Little Grandad
- Mary in the Junkyard
- Miranda Sex Garden
- Gary Numan
- Placebo
- The Psychedelic Furs
- Razorlight
- Saint Etienne
- Shakespears Sister
- The Skinner Brothers
- Sleeper
- Suede
- Talk Talk
- Then Jerico
- Simon Warner
- White Lies
- Wolf Alice
- The xx
- Yuck

== Punk and ska ==
- Amazulu
- Bad Manners
- The Belle Stars
- Billy Idol
- Bow Wow Wow
- The Clash
- Conflict
- Crass
- The Damned
- Generation X
- The Jam
- Killing Joke
- Madness
- The Passions
- Public Image Ltd
- Rubella Ballet
- The Ruts
- Sex Pistols
- Sham 69
- Sigue Sigue Sputnik
- Siouxsie and the Banshees
- The Slits
- The Stranglers
- The The
- Transvision Vamp
- Towers of London
- Toyah
- U.K. Subs
- Jah Wobble
- X-Ray Spex

== Metal ==
- Akercocke
- Angel Witch
- Charlie 'Ungry
- Deep Machine
- DragonForce
- Gillan
- Girlschool
- Green Lung
- Grim Reaper
- Iron Maiden
- Mournblade
- Orange Goblin
- Praying Mantis
- Samson
- Tank

== R&B, soul and reggae ==
- Adele
- Architechs
- Aswad
- Black Slate
- Brand New Heavies
- Alexandra Burke
- Des'ree
- The Foundations
- Eruption
- Estelle
- Eternal
- Paloma Faith
- Gabrielle
- Eddy Grant (born in Guyana raised in London)
- Janet Kay
- Jean Adebambo
- Junior
- Heartless Crew
- Hot Chocolate
- Dee C Lee
- C.J. Lewis
- Loose Ends
- Louisa Marks
- Mis-Teeq
- Moko
- Maxi Priest
- Billy Ocean
- Sade
- Seal
- Smiley Culture
- Soul II Soul
- Dusty Springfield
- Sugababes
- Amy Winehouse

== Dance ==
- Audio Bullys
- Basement Jaxx
- The Beloved
- Clean Bandit
- Coldcut
- DJ Luck & MC Neat
- Dreadzone
- Faithless
- Fatboy Slim
- Jess Glynne
- Gonzalez
- The Grid
- Groove Armada
- Jamiroquai
- The KLF
- Leftfield
- M.A.R.R.S.
- Morcheeba
- Olive
- The Orb
- Real Lies
- Rudimental
- SL2
- So Solid Crew
- Soho
- Sonique
- Undercover

== Rap ==
- AJ Tracey
- Cookie Crew

Central Cee Dave

- Devilman (D-E-Velopment)
- Dizzee Rascal
- Ghetts
- Giggs
- JME
- Lethal Bizzle
- Lil Simz
- London Posse
- MF Doom
- Monie Love
- Nadia Rose
- Paigey Cakey
- Plan B
- Professor Green
- Roll Deep
- Roots Manuva
- Skepta
- Slick Rick
- Stormzy
- Sway
- Tinie Tempah
- Wee Papa Girl Rappers
- Wretch 32
- Wiley

== Folk and singer-songwriter ==
- Martin Briley
- Albert Hammond
- Elton John
- Kirsty MacColl
- Mumford & Sons
- Noah and the Whale
- Pentangle
- Skinny Lister
- Bear's Den
- Sandy Denny

== House and electronic ==
- Audio Bullys
- Alunageorge
- Art of Trance
- Basement Jaxx
- Bomb The Bass
- Crim3s
- Disclosure
- Maya Jane Coles
- Sounds from the Ground
- S-Express
- The Orb
- Mat Zo

== Synth-pop ==
- Art of Noise
- Belouis Some
- Blancmange
- Bronski Beat
- The Buggles
- Classix Nouveaux
- The Communards
- Thomas Dolby
- Eighth Wonder
- Erasure
- Eurythmics
- Fad Gadget
- Frankmusik
- Freeez
- Goldfrapp
- Go West
- Haysi Fantayzee
- Hot Chip
- Landscape
- La Roux
- M
- New Musik
- Gary Numan
- Paul Hardcastle
- Imagination
- Japan
- Pet Shop Boys
- Tubeway Army
- Ultravox
- Visage
- Years & Years
