= Temporary (album) =

Studio album by Everything Is Recorded
- Released: 28 February 2025
- Length: 46:58
- Label: XL
- Producer: Richard Russell

Everything Is Recorded chronology
Friday Forever (2020)	Temporary (2025)

Temporary is the third studio album by Everything Is Recorded, a project of British record producer Richard Russell. It was released on 28 February 2025 through his record label XL Recordings. It received generally favorable reviews from critics.

== Background ==
Temporary is Everything Is Recorded's third studio album, following Everything Is Recorded by Richard Russell (2018) and Friday Forever (2020). It features guest appearances from Sampha, Laura Groves, Rickey Washington, Alabaster DePlume, Noah Cyrus, Bill Callahan, Florence Welch, Maddy Prior, Jah Wobble, Yazz Ahmed, Berwyn, Roses Gabor, Jack Peñate, Samantha Morton, Mary in the Junkyard, Kamasi Washington, and Nourished by Time. It was created over the span of four years.

Music videos were released for "Porcupine Tattoo", "Losing You", "Swamp Dream #3", and "Never Felt Better".

== Critical reception ==
Professional ratings
Aggregate scores
Source	Rating
Metacritic	74/100
Review scores
Source	Rating
AllMusic	4/5 stars
Clash	8/10
Far Out	4.5/5 stars

According to the review aggregator Metacritic, Temporary received "generally favorable reviews" based on a weighted average score of 74 out of 100 from 4 critic scores.

Andy Kellman of AllMusic stated, "Wholly contemporary with apparitional qualities, its production is an electronic-acoustic synthesis with everything from subtle drum programming and sensitively played keyboards to foot percussion, slide guitar, and strings." Josh Crowe of Clash commented that "Russell's decision to prioritise melody over rhythm results in an album that feels weightless yet deeply affecting, like sunlight filtering through the cracks of a long-lost memory."

=== Accolades ===
Year-end lists for Temporary
Publication	List	Rank	Ref.
AllMusic	AllMusic Best of 2025	—	

== Track listing ==
Temporary track listing
No.	Title	Writer(s)	Length
1.	"October"	Richard Russell; Jackson C. Frank	1:13
2.	"My and Me" (featuring Sampha, Laura Groves, Rickey Washington, and Alabaster DePlume)	Russell; Ben Baptie; Camille Yarbrough	3:31
3.	"Porcupine Tattoo" (featuring Noah Cyrus and Bill Callahan)	Bill Callahan	3:26
4.	"Never Felt Better" (featuring Sampha and Florence Welch)	Russell; Sampha Sisay; Florence Welch	4:27
5.	"Ether" (featuring Maddy Prior)	Russell; Ezra Koenig	3:19
6.	"Losing You" (featuring Sampha, Laura Groves, Jah Wobble, and Yazz Ahmed)	Russell; Laura Groves; Sisay; John Wardle	3:11
7.	"Firelight" (featuring Florence Welch, Berwyn, and Alabaster DePlume)	Russell; Berwyn Du Bois; Molly Drake; Welch	3:22
8.	"The Summons"	Russell	1:28
9.	"No More Rehearsals" (featuring Jah Wobble, Roses Gabor, Jack Peñate, and Yazz Ahmed)	Russell; Roses Gabor; Shawn Smith; Wardle	3:13
10.	"You Were Smiling" (featuring Samantha Morton)	Russell; Edna Gallmon Cooke; Samantha Morton; Jack Peñate	3:53
11.	"Norm" (featuring Bill Callahan)	Russell; Callahan	2:59
12.	"Swamp Dream #3" (featuring Mary in the Junkyard)	Russell; Clari Freeman-Taylor	4:29
13.	"The Meadows" (featuring Roses Gabor, Kamasi Washington, and Rickey Washington)	Russell; Peñate; Sisay	4:49
14.	"Goodbye (Hell of a Ride)" (featuring Nourished by Time)	Russell; Gil Scott-Heron	3:37
Total length:			46:58

== Personnel ==
Credits adapted from Tidal.

=== Musicians ===
- Richard Russell – programming (tracks 1, 2, 4–8, 11, 13), sampler (1), bass guitar (2, 10, 11), percussion (3), guitar (4, 8, 9), accordion (5), drums (6, 7, 12), synthesizer (14)
- Alabaster DePlume – saxophone (tracks 1, 2, 7, 9, 10)
- Sampha – vocals (tracks 2, 4, 6), piano (2, 4, 13)
- Laura Groves – vocals (track 2), piano (6, 9), synthesizer (13)
- Rickey Washington – flute (tracks 2, 13)
- Raven Bush – strings (tracks 2, 13)
- Jack Peñate – piano (tracks 3, 10), bass guitar (4), vocals (5, 9), guitar (7, 13)
- Bill Callahan – vocals (tracks 3, 11), guitar (3)
- Dan Kalisher – Dobro guitar (track 3)
- Noah Cyrus – vocals, percussion (track 3)
- Florence Welch – vocals (tracks 4, 7), percussion (4)
- Andrew Sinclair – guitar (track 5)
- Kirkis – organ (track 5)
- Ezra Koenig – piano (track 5)
- Maddy Prior – vocals (track 5)
- Jah Wobble – bass guitar (tracks 6, 9)
- Yazz Ahmed – trumpet (tracks 6, 9)
- Berwyn Du Bois – vocals (track 7)
- Sonny Russell – drums (track 9)
- Roses Gabor – vocals (tracks 9, 13)
- Maxwell Sterling – electric upright bass (track 10)
- Samantha Morton – vocals (track 10)
- Joe Brown – piano (track 11)
- Lisa Diaz – vocals (track 11)
- Clari FT – piano (track 12)
- Mary in the Junkyard – vocals (track 12)
- Kamasi Washington – saxophone (track 13)
- Danielle Ponder – vocals (track 13)
- Marcus Brown – guitar (track 14)

=== Technical ===
- Richard Russell – production (all tracks), mixing (tracks 1–3, 5–14), engineering (1, 6–11, 13, 14)
- Marcus Brown – production, engineering (track 14)
- Matt Colton – mastering
- Ben Baptie – mixing (tracks 1–9, 13, 14)
- Jack Peñate – engineering (tracks 2–5, 7)
- Joe Brown – engineering (tracks 2, 4, 9)
- Liam Larkin – engineering (track 4)
- Chloe Beth Smith – engineering (track 5)
- Kirkis – engineering (track 5)
- Andrea Cozzaglio – engineering (tracks 9, 12)
- Matt Jagger – engineering (track 9)

== Charts ==
Chart performance for Temporary
Chart (2025)	Peak position
UK Album Downloads (OCC)	67
UK Independent Albums (OCC)	47
