= Friday Forever =

Friday Forever may refer to:

- "Friday Forever", a 2018 single by Trophy Eyes
- Friday Forever (album), a 2020 studio album by Everything Is Recorded
