= Mike Catalano (musician) =

American jazz composer and musician

- Occupations: Jazz pianist, composer, producer
- Known for: A Rio Affair (1989), A Manhattan Affair (2007), and Themes and Dreams, Cinematic Music Vol. 1 (2025).

Mike Catalano is an American contemporary jazz pianist, composer, and producer who has worked and recorded with many artists in the contemporary and Brazilian jazz genres. He is known for his work composing original music for Fox Television programs and his "affair" jazz albums, including A Rio Affair (1989), A Manhattan Affair (2007), and Themes and Dreams, Cinematic Music Vol. 1 (2025). He has also composed music for various television and stage productions.

== Career ==
Catalano began composing and performing in his late teens, collaborating with established New York City session musicians. His early work was produced and engineered by guitarist Dean Bailin, whose credits included Rupert Holmes. These sessions, initially titled Good Neighbors, featured contributions from saxophonist Lou Marini, trumpeter Alan Rubin, and drummer Steve Gadd.

=== A Rio Affair (1989) ===
Those sessions eventually evolved into Catalano's debut album, A Rio Affair (1989). Influenced by Antônio Carlos Jobim, Catalano expanded the recordings to include Brazilian studio musicians. While the New York sessions featured Mark Egan and Randy Brecker, the Rio de Janeiro sessions included collaborations with bassist Nico Assumpção, guitarist Ricardo Silveira, and percussionist Armando Marçal. The album was released by Maracujazz and distributed by Polygram in Brazil.

=== A Manhattan Affair (2007) ===
Catalano’s follow-up album, A Manhattan Affair, was co-produced by bassist Will Lee. The album consists of thirteen tracks, including Catalano originals and jazz standards such as "The Fool on the Hill" and "Beauty and the Beast". The project featured guest appearances by pianist Bob James, guitarist Chuck Loeb, and Brazilian singer-songwriter Ivan Lins. Lins provided vocals for two versions of the Antônio Carlos Jobim classic "Dindi"—one in English and one in Portuguese.

Matt Collar, reviewing the album for AllMusic, wrote that A Manhattan Affair features "crisp and breezy smooth jazz that touches on melodic rock, lightly funky R&B and bossa nova... refreshing, often lushly arranged and endlessly melodic cuts that make the most of Catalano's tasteful keyboard chops." The album was released on the Catman Records label.

In 2009, Catalano made his international jazz festival debut performing at the 8th edition of the Rochester International Jazz Festival.

=== Themes and Dreams (2025) ===
Catalano’s third album, Themes and Dreams: Cinematic Music, Vol. 1, was released in December 2025.

=== Other recordings ===
In 2002, Catalano served as executive producer, alongside bassist Will Lee, for Brazilian singer Jane Duboc's album Sweet Lady Jane. The project was produced by Ivan Lins and featured arrangements by Rob Mounsey, incorporating a full orchestra and jazz ensemble.

== Television and stage ==
In the mid-1980s, Catalano began a professional collaboration with journalist Steve Dunleavy, who was then a lead reporter for the Fox TV newsmagazine series A Current Affair. Catalano composed the original theme and various musical segments for the program, and subsequently provided theme and underscore music for other Fox Television properties, including The Reporters, Good Day New York, and Fox News. Dunleavy wrote the liner notes for Catalano's 2007 album, A Manhattan Affair.

In 2010, Catalano composed and orchestrated the music for a revival of the 1940 play Brooklyn USA at the Write Act Theatre in Los Angeles.

== Awards ==
Catalano's song "Smooth as Silk," from the album A Manhattan Affair, was awarded First Place in the instrumental category of the 19th Annual Great American Song Contest in 2017.
