= Spell 31 =

Studio album by Ibeyi
- Released: 6 May 2022
- Length: 25:53
- Label: XL
- Producer: Richard Russell

Ibeyi chronology
Ash (2017)	Spell 31 (2022)	Offering (2026)

Singles from Spell 31
- 1. "Made of Gold" Released: 18 November 2021; 2. "Sister 2 Sister" Released: 10 February 2022; 3. "Lavender & Red Roses" Released: 1 April 2022

Spell 31 ratings
Aggregate scores
Source	Rating
Metacritic	80/100
Review scores
Source	Rating
AllMusic	4/5 stars
Clash	8/10
DIY	4/5 stars
The Line of Best Fit	8/10
Loud and Quiet	7/10
Uncut	7/10

Spell 31 is the third studio album by Afro-French Cuban sibling duo Ibeyi, released on 6 May 2022, by XL Recordings.

== Track listing ==
All tracks are written by Lisa-Kaïndé Diaz except track 2, with other writers noted.

Spell 31 track listing
No.	Title	Writer(s)	Length
1.	"Sangoma"	Naomi Diaz	2:45
2.	"O Inle"	Traditional	0:33
3.	"Made of Gold" (with Pa Salieu)	Salieu	3:48
4.	"Sister 2 Sister"	Eg White	3:15
5.	"Creature (Perfect)"	White	3:31
6.	"Tears Are Our Medicine"		2:37
7.	"Foreign Country"	Salieu	1:40
8.	"Lavender & Red Roses" (with Jorja Smith)	Cornelius Cameron; Noel Earl Davey; Richard Russell	2:54
9.	"Rise Above" (featuring Berwyn)	Angá Díaz; Berwyn; Greg Ginn	3:31
10.	"Los Muertos"	N. Diaz; A. Diaz; Joel Hierrezuelo Belart	1:19
Total length:			25:53

== Personnel ==
- Lisa-Kaïndé Diaz – vocals
- Naomi Diaz – vocals, percussion, arranger (1, 4–10)
- Richard Russell – producer, arranger (4, 6–8)
- Pa Salieu – vocals (3, 7)
- Jorja Smith – vocals (8)
- Berwyn – vocals (9)
- Joe Brown – recording engineer, instrumental performance (7, 8)
- Ricky Damian – mixing engineer
- Eg White – instrumental performance (5)
- Owen Pallett – arranger, instrumental performance (5)
- Ben Reed – arranger (6), instrumental performance (4–7)
- Dave Okumu – instrumental performance (4)
- Maya Dagnino – instrumental performance (7)
- Casisdead – instrumental performance (9)
