= Jennifer Marks =

American singer-songwriter

- Born: Long Island, New York, U.S.
- Occupations: Singer; songwriter; musician
- Years active: 1994–present
- Spouse: Josh Golden (m. 2000)
- Children: 2
- Musical career
- Genres: Pop; Rock; Adult Contemporary
- Instruments: Vocals; guitar
- Labels: Bardic Records; Red Kurl

Jennifer Marks is an American singer, songwriter, and musician. Her single, "Fragile," won the Grand Prize in the Great American Song Contest and her single, "Thick," won first place in the US Songwriting Contest in 2000. Her song, "Live," received a fair amount of national airplay on Adult Top 40 radio stations and she was the opening act on Cyndi Lauper's 16-city US tour in 2004.

== Early life and education ==
Jennifer Marks was born on Long Island, New York to parents Michael Schonberg and Helena Marksohn. She moved to NYC to attend NYU Stern where she graduated with a bachelor's degree in Music Business. After Marks moved to New York she learned to play guitar.

== Career ==
Jennifer Marks is a singer, songwriter, guitarist, and author. She has released four studio albums, Pizza (1997), My Name's Not Red (2000), It Turned Me On (2002), Jennifer Marks (2004), and Tornadoes and Rollercoasters (2023). She was the opening act for Cyndi Lauper's 2008 tour and has performed with Carrie Newcomer, Jenny Bruce, Rachael Sage, and others. She won 1st place in the Great American Songwriting Competition, USA Songwriting Contest, and was an American Music Award Top 10 finalist (out of 800 entries).

Shortly after graduating from NYU Stern Marks was signed to a major publishing deal. She recorded nine demo recordings and released them on her debut album, Pizza.

In 2000, Marks released her sophomore album, My Name's Not Red, which received favorable reviews. "Thick" won Best Rock Song and Second Overall Grand Prize out of 33,000 entries which were judged by representatives from Warner/Reprise Records, Walt Disney Music Publishing, and Sony Music. "Fragile" won first place in the Great American Song Contest and she was inducted into GASC hall of fame, as well. Marks is the owner of Red Kurl Records.

Singles from the album received college airplay and WLIR named her "Independent Artist of the Week." Martha Byrne performed several of Marks' songs on As the World Turns, and her songs have been featured in independent films, Jane Doe (Calista Flockhart), Let it Snow (Bernadette Peters).

In 2002, she released her third album, It Turned Me On, and began touring as a solo artist. The single performed well, garnering college radio airplay and appearing in independent films and the daytime soap opera, As The World Turns.

In 2004, Marks signed with Bardic Records and released Jennifer Marks (self-titled). The album's single, "Live," received favorable reviews and garnered national airplay throughout 2004. Billboard magazine said, "Marks delivery is lively and fun." "Live," was featured in Mattel's My Scene: Masquerade Madness and on Hello Kitty's album Hello World. Marks was the opening act on Cyndi Lauper's 2004 16-city national tour.

In 2009, Marks teamed up with artists Jessica Hoffman, Maya Churi, and Heather Staples to write the music for, My Changing Planet, a children's music album which included performances by Joan Osborne, Noah Emmerich, and Toby Lightman, among others.

== Discography ==
- 1997 - Pizza
- 2000 - My Name's Not Red
- 2002 - It Turned me On
- 2004 - Jennifer Marks
- 2009 - My Changing Planet
- 2023 - Tornadoes and Rollercoasters
