= The Passionate Ones =

2025 studio album by Nourished by Time

Studio album by Nourished by Time
- Released: August 22, 2025
- Recorded: 2024–2025
- Genres: Pop, R&B
- Length: 44:58
- Label: XL
- Producer: Nourished by Time

Nourished by Time chronology
Catching Chickens (2024)	The Passionate Ones (2025)

Singles from The Passionate Ones
- 1. "Max Potential" Released: May 7, 2025; 2. "9 2 5" Released: June 17, 2025; 3. "Baby Baby" Released: July 29, 2025

The Passionate Ones is the second studio album by American musician Nourished by Time. It was released on August 22, 2025, by XL Recordings. The album follows his 2023 debut album Erotic Probiotic 2 and his 2024 EP Catching Chickens.

== Background and recording ==
XL describes the record as a "twelve-track catharsis" and Nourished by Time's first full-length release for the label. The project was crafted between Baltimore, London and New York. Early coverage that frames the album's themes around love, labor and everyday existential pressure, "howled from the underbelly of late-stage capitalism."

== Release and promotion ==
The Passionate Ones was announced alongside the lead single "Max Potential" on May 7, 2025, with an accompanying music video. The second single, "9 2 5," followed on June 17, 2025. The album's third single, "Baby Baby", was released on July 29, 2025 with a video. The album was released on August 22, 2025, via XL Recordings in multiple formats.

== Critical reception ==
Professional ratings
Aggregate scores
Source	Rating
AnyDecentMusic?	8.4/10
Metacritic	89/100
Review scores
Source	Rating
AllMusic	4.5/5 stars
The A.V. Club	A
Beats Per Minute	86%
The Guardian	4/5 stars
The Line of Best Fit	9/10
Mojo	4/5 stars
NME	4/5 stars
Pitchfork	8.4/10
The Skinny	4/5 stars
Slant Magazine	4/5 stars

According to Metacritic, The Passionate Ones has a weighted average score of 89 out of 100, based on fifteen reviews. Pitchfork gave the album a score of 8.4/10, highlighting it as Best New Music. Writing for The Guardian, Katie Hawthorne described the album as "committed" and "full-hearted," highlighting "9 2 5" as a "song of the summer" contender. NME also reviewed the record under the headline "welcoming and deservedly self-assured." In December 2025, Paste Magazine named The Passionate Ones the best album of 2025.

== Track listing ==
All tracks are written by Nourished by Time.

The Passionate Ones track listing
No.	Title	Length
1.	"Automatic Love"	4:02
2.	"Idiot in the Park"	3:19
3.	"Max Potential"	3:52
4.	"It's Time"	3:52
5.	"Cult Interlude"	2:00
6.	"9 2 5"	4:29
7.	"Crazy People"	3:46
8.	"Jojo" (featuring Tony Bontana)	3:36
9.	"Baby Baby"	3:17
10.	"Tossed Away"	4:50
11.	"When the War Is Over"	3:29
12.	"The Passionate Ones"	4:26
Total length:		44:58

=== Sample credits ===
- "Max Potential" contains a sample of "Saved", written and performed by Labi Siffre.
- "Crazy People" contains a sample of the Dear Mr. President collection, courtesy of the Library of Congress.

== Personnel ==
Credits adapted from the album's liner notes and Tidal.

- Nourished by Time – vocals, piano, programming, production, mixing, engineering
- Frank the Carvery – mastering
- Caroline Waxse – images
- Jake Simmonds – design
- Tony Bontana – additional vocals on "Jojo"

== Charts ==
Chart performance for The Passionate Ones
Chart (2025)	Peak position
UK Independent Albums Breakers (OCC)	17
UK R&B Albums (Official Charts)	9

== Release history ==
Release dates and formats for The Passionate Ones
Region	Date	Format	Label	Ref.
Various	August 22, 2025	CD; LP; digital download; streaming	XL	
