= Ibeyi (album) =

Studio album by Ibeyi
- Released: 17 February 2015
- Recorded: March–August 2014
- Studio: Studio RLR (London)
- Genre: Downtempo, neo soul, ethnic fusion, avant garde, art pop, experimental
- Length: 45:57
- Label: XL
- Producer: Richard Russell

Ibeyi chronology
Ibeyi (2015)	Ash (2017)

Professional ratings
Aggregate scores
Source	Rating
Metacritic	78/100
Review scores
Source	Rating
DIY	3/5 stars
Exclaim!	9/10
The Guardian	3/5 stars
MusicOMH	4/5 stars
NME	8/10
Now	NN
The Observer	3/5 stars
The Skinny	5/5 stars

Ibeyi is the debut album of Ibeyi, released in February 2015. The album is a series of reflections on love, death and family that spans countries as well as genres. The album pays tribute to the duo's deceased father, Anga Díaz, and the track Yanira immortalizes the duo's older sister, who died several years ago.

The first single released was "Oya".

The video for their album's second single, "River", received attention for its stark minimalism. The twin sisters, Lisa-Kainde and Naomi Diaz, appear in a closeup shot throughout, taking turns having their heads forced underwater while the other sings.

== Track listing ==
All music is composed by Lisa Kaindé Diaz.

Ibeyi track listing
No.	Title	Lyrics	Length
1.	"Eleggua" (Intro)	Traditional	1:16
2.	"Oya"	Lisa Kaindé Diaz	3:52
3.	"Ghosts"	Diaz; Bird Paula; Maya Dagnino	3:31
4.	"River"	Diaz; Eric Collins	4:12
5.	"Think of You"	Diaz; Dagnino; Richard Russell^{[a]}	3:40
6.	"Behind the Curtain"	Collins	4:13
7.	"Stranger/ Lover"	Dagnino	4:11
8.	"Mama Says"	Diaz	4:09
9.	"Weatherman"	Diaz; Dagnino	4:02
10.	"Faithful"	Diaz	3:27
11.	"Yanira"	Diaz; Collins	3:37
12.	"Singles"	Diaz; Collins	3:59
13.	"Ibeyi"	Traditional	1:48
Total length:			45:57

Japanese edition bonus tracks
No.	Title	Length
14.	"Fly"	3:32
15.	"Chains"	3:01

== Personnel ==
Ibeyi

- Lisa Kaindé Diaz – vocals, bass guitar, piano, synthesizer, vocal arrangement (all tracks); arrangement (tracks 1, 13)
- Naomi Diaz – vocals, drums, percussion, vocal arrangement (all tracks); arrangement (1, 13), programming (2, 4, 5, 8, 9, 11)

Other contributors

- Richard Russell – production, engineering, mixing, additional instrumentation, additional programming
- John Foyle – mixing, engineering, additional programming
- Vlado Meller – mastering
- Miguel Ballumbrosio – percussion pre-producer
- Benjamin Constant – pre-producer
- Phil Lee – art direction, design
- Maya Dagnino – cover photography
- Sadika Moussous – cover photography
- Gabriel Jourde – programming (5)

== Charts ==
=== Weekly charts ===
Chart (2015)	Peak position
Belgian Albums (Ultratop Flanders)	28
Belgian Albums (Ultratop Wallonia)	35
Dutch Albums (Album Top 100)	52
French Albums (SNEP)	14
German Albums (Offizielle Top 100)	58
Swiss Albums (Schweizer Hitparade)	20
UK Albums (OCC)	36
US Billboard 200	166

=== Year-end charts ===
Chart (2015)	Position
Belgian Albums (Ultratop Flanders)	144
French Albums (SNEP)	86

== Notes ==
- ^{^[a]} "Think of You" contains a sample of "Winter Is Coming" written by Gabriel Jourde and performed by Kid Atlaas; and a sample of "'Round Midnight" composed by Thelonious Monk, Bernard Hanighen, and Cootie Williams and performed by Angá Díaz.
