= Nourished by Time =

American singer, songwriter and producer

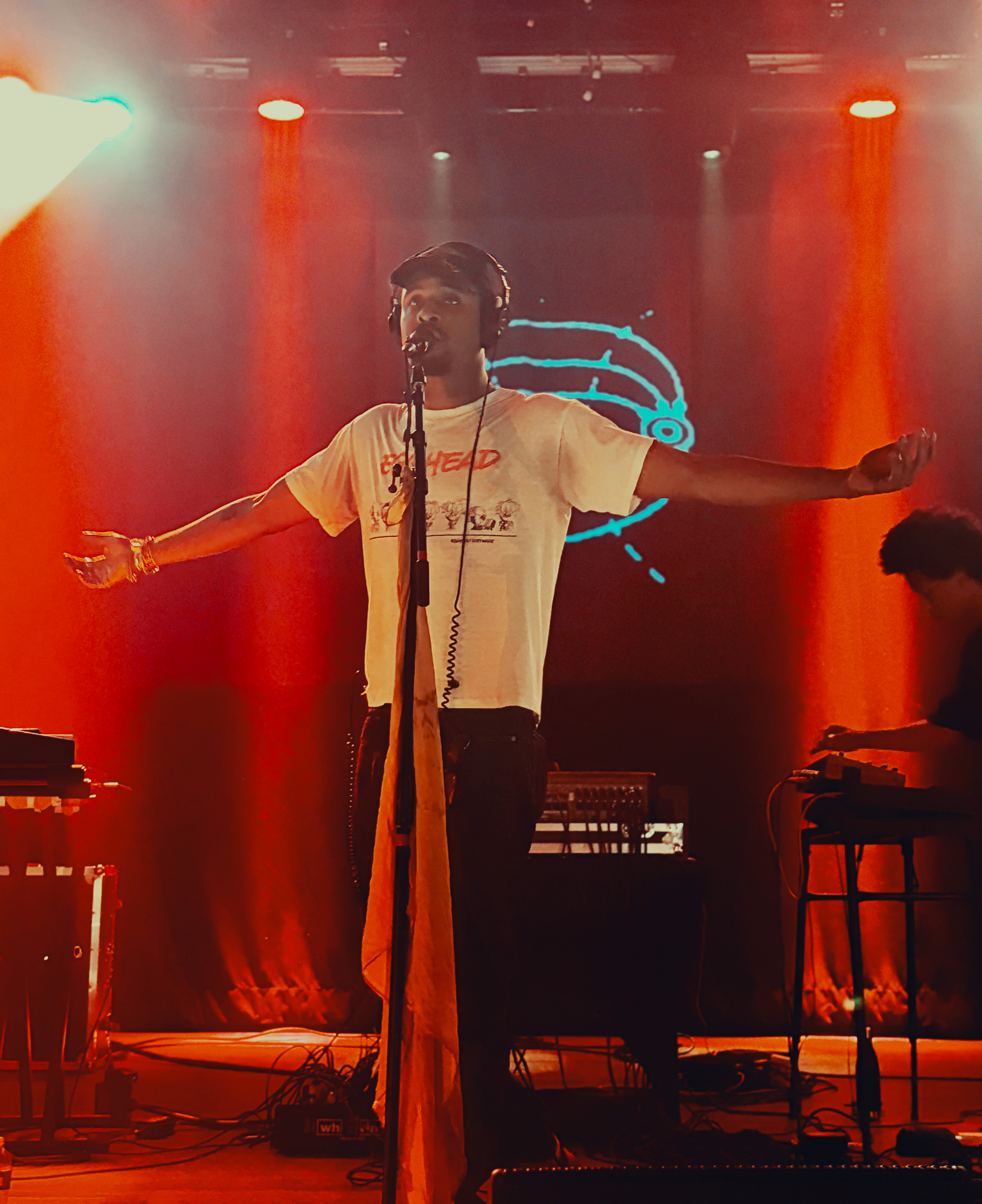
- Brown in 2025

Background information
- Also known as: Riley With Fire; Mother Marcus
- Born: Marcus Elliot Brown; Baltimore, Maryland, U.S.
- Genres: Alternative R&B; synth-pop; indie electronic
- Occupations: Singer; songwriter; producer
- Years active: 2020–present
- Labels: Scenic Route; XL

Marcus Elliot Brown, known professionally as Nourished by Time, is an American singer, songwriter, and record producer from Baltimore, Maryland. Blending lo-fi synth-pop, post-punk textures and early-'90s R&B, Brown received widespread critical notice for his 2023 debut album Erotic Probiotic 2, which was awarded Best New Music by Pitchfork. Follow-up releases—the Catching Chickens EP (2024) and album The Passionate Ones (2025)—mark his move to XL Recordings and have cemented his reputation as "a DIY pop star who turns every limitation into an asset."

== Early life and education ==
Brown grew up in Baltimore, listening to his parents' hip-hop, jazz and '90s R&B collection. At age 15 he began playing guitar after seeing Slash perform with Michael Jackson, later citing Jimi Hendrix as an early influence. He played trombone and percussion in his high-school marching and jazz bands before enrolling at the Berklee College of Music at 17. Brown has said songwriter-in-residence Pat Pattison was "the only professor who let me be weird."

== Career ==
=== 2019–2022: Early projects ===
While living in Los Angeles' Koreatown, Brown self-released music under the aliases Riley With Fire and Mother Marcus. He adopted Nourished by Time in 2020, describing it as "a mantra about staying consistent." Brown said, "I just never wanted to use my name. I always thought my name was boring as hell."

=== 2023: Erotic Probiotic 2 ===
Recorded in his parents' basement during COVID-19 lockdowns, Erotic Probiotic 2 mixed freestyle, dream-pop and Baltimore club. The record earned Best New Music from Pitchfork (score 8.2) and appeared in year-end lists by Paste, The Guardian and Gorilla vs. Bear.

Brown spent much of 2023 on tour, supporting London post-punk band Dry Cleaning across North America and remixing their single "Gary Ashby." He also appeared on "Happy," a track from Yaeji's debut album With a Hammer.

=== 2024: Catching Chickens EP ===
In February 2024 Brown signed to XL Recordings, announcing the five-track EP Catching Chickens and sharing the single "Hand on Me." The EP, named after a scene in Rocky II, was released digitally on March 22, 2024, and on vinyl that May.

=== 2025: The Passionate Ones ===
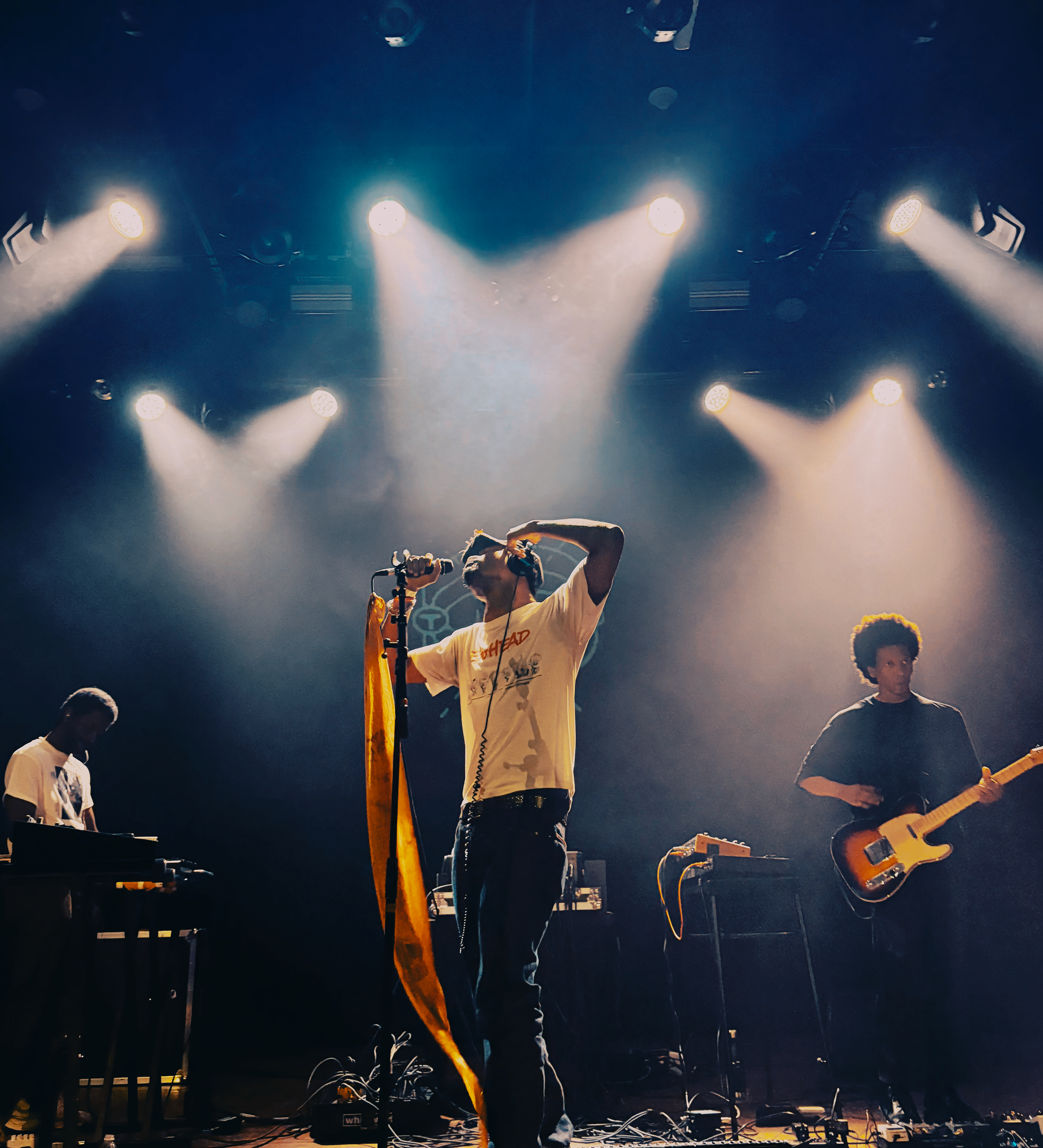
Nourished by Time performing at Irving Plaza in 2025 for The Passionate Ones tour

Brown's second full-length album, The Passionate Ones, was released on August 22, 2025 via XL, preceded by the singles "Max Potential" and "9 2 5." A 25-date North-American and European tour in support of the album began in September 2025.

== Musical style and influences ==
Critics describe Brown's music as "genre-bending" and "metamodernist," merging lo-fi indie pop, hip-hop, synthy post-punk and '90s new jack swing. His cited influences include Arthur Russell, Tony! Toni! Toné!, Prince, SWV and producer PM Dawn. Brown's stage name is an allusion to indie rock band Guided by Voices.

Lyrically, Brown often addresses class politics and late-stage capitalism. About his politics, Brown said: "Name one socialist pop star – it doesn’t exist. I can be a socialist rock star or something like that. But I can’t be a socialist pop star."

== Personal life ==
As of August 2025, Brown lives in New York City.

== Discography ==
=== Studio albums ===
- Erotic Probiotic 2 (2023, Scenic Route)
- The Passionate Ones (2025, XL)

=== EPs ===
- Catching Chickens (2024, XL)

=== Selected singles ===
- "The Fields" (2023)
- "Hand on Me" (2024)
- "9 2 5" (2025)

=== Guest appearances ===
- Yaeji – "Happy" on With a Hammer (2023)
- Metronomy – "Metronomy x Nourished by Time - My Love" (2024)
- Kacy Hill – "My Day Off" on Bug (2024)

=== Remixes ===
- Dry Cleaning – "Gary Ashby (Nourished by Time Remix)" (2023)
- Water from Your Eyes - "True Life (Nourished by Time Version)" (2023)

=== Music videos ===
List of music videos, showing year released and director
Title	Year	Director
"Came & Went"	2020	Nourished by Time
"Sharing"	2020	Nourished by Time
"The Fields"	2021	Nourished by Time
"The Wall"	2022	Nourished by Time
"Staring into the Fireplace"	2022	Nourished by Time
"Catharsis"	2022	Nourished by Time
"Quantum Suicide"	2023	Nourished by Time
"Daddy"	2023	Nourished by Time
"The Fields"	2023	Nourished by Time
"Hand On Me"	2024	Nourished by Time
"Hell of a Ride"	2024	Nourished by Time
"Romance In Me"	2024	Aslı Baykal
"Max Potential"	2025	Nourished by Time
"9 2 5"	2025	Cody Marian
"Baby Baby"	2025	Caroline Waxse
