= Role Model Hermit =

Studio album by mary in the junkyard
- Released: 3 July 2026
- Length: 45:10
- Label: AMF Records

Singles from Role Model Hermit
- 1. "Crash Landing" Released: 24 March 2026; 2. "Candelabra" Released: 21 April 2026; 3. "New Muscles" Released: 18 May 2026; 4. "Mouse" Released: 9 June 2026; 5. "Blood" Released: 30 June 2026

Role Model Hermit is the debut album by the English band mary in the junkyard, released on 3 July 2026 through AMF Records.

== Release ==
On 24 March 2026, the band announced the album with the release of the first single "Crash Landing". The track has a music video that was created by Maisy Banks and Jacob Ray.

On 21 April 2026, the band released the second single "Candelabra". The single is accompanied by a video of Freeman-Taylor's solo-acoustic version of the song, which shows her playing the song whilst walking along the banks of the Thames.

On 18 May 2026, the band released the third single "New Muscles". The song was originally written on the accordion and is reportedly "about David [Addison] joining a gym". It is accompanied by a music video, directed by Barbaglia, Daisy Ayscough, and Luke Grieve, and depicts a fight between Barbaglia and Freeman-Taylor.

On 9 June 2026, the band released the fourth single "Mouse", which is the inspiration for the album's cover.

On 30 June 2026, the band released the fifth and final single "Blood", which is accompanied by a music video.

Role Model Hermit was released on 3 July 2026 through AMF Records. Different versions of the album were released, including a Rough Trade exclusive version of the album that contained a bonus CD with 4 extra tracks. The release of the album was supported by an UK in-store tour, originally planned to start on 2 July in Kingston upon Thames, and conclude on 10 July in Glasgow; an UK and European headline tour, planned to start on 11 September in Groningen, and conclude on 8 October in Amsterdam; and an US headline tour, planned to start on 2 November in Los Angeles, and conclude 21 November in Philadelphia.

== Critical reception ==
Professional ratings
Aggregate scores
Source	Rating
AnyDecentMusic?	8.0/10
Metacritic	82/100
Review scores
Source	Rating
Clash	8/10
Far Out	4.5/5 stars
NME	3.5/5 stars
Northern Transmissions	8.3/10
Pitchfork	7.6/10
The Skinny	5/5 stars

Role Model Hermit has received acclaim from critics. At Metacritic, which assigns a weighted average rating out of 100 to reviews from mainstream critics, Role Model Hermit received a rating of 82 out of 100 based on 10 critic reviews, indicating "universal acclaim". Similarly, on AnyDecentMusic?, it received a rating of 8.0 out of 10, based on 13 reviews.

Writing for NME, JX Soo wrote that the band have "an intricate magic weaved from ... Freeman-Taylor's poetic, observational eye and freewheeling arrangements, equally informed by wiry math-laden contemporaries and elegant classical stylings." Clash wrote of the album that "you feel lost in thecentre [sic] of a dream-like sonic swell". Sadie Sartini Garner wrote in Pitchfork that the band "updates the naive humanism of 2000s indie-folk with modern dread and restless experimentation", and noted that the album is "clearly the work of a band who knows exactly who they are". Billie Estrine wrote that the album is "magnificent feat in angry, sad and fantastical folk-rock" in The Skinny. Dale Maplethorpe of Far Out wrote that "it's rare that you hear a debut album sound so perfectly fleshed out and put together", adding that "it's about as perfect as a debut album gets".

== Track listing and personnel ==
All tracks are written by Clari Freeman-Taylor, Saya Barbagli, and David Addison.

Role Model Hermit track listing
No.	Title	Length
1.	"Mantra III"	2:41
2.	"Blood"	3:56
3.	"Seek And Destroy"	4:36
4.	"New Muscles"	3:54
5.	"Myrtle"	4:22
6.	"Peter The Dog"	2:29
7.	"Crash Landing"	5:34
8.	"Welcome Break"	3:37
9.	"Candelabra"	3:28
10.	"Thou Shalt Sprout"	5:32
11.	"Mouse"	4:57
Total length:		45:10

Rough Trade bonus CD
No.	Title	Length
1.	"Mantra III" (extended version)
2.	"Jane"
3.	"The Old Tongue"
4.	"Mouse" (demo version)

The album was produced by Oli Bayston, in his studio during the summer of 2025; engineered by Tommy Bosustow and Animesh Raval, with additional vocal engineering by Simon Bloor; mixed by Ben Baptie; and mastered by Matt Colton. The cover for the album was born by a collaboration with creative director Daisy Ayscough and it features Freeman-Taylor wearing prosthetics in order to resemble the character from their song "Mouse". Other art direction and design was done by Daisy Ayscough, Tess Duffin, and Freeman-Taylor, and album photographs were taken by Luke Grieve and Daisy Ayscough.

== Charts ==
Weekly chart performance for Role Model Hermit
Chart (2010)	Peak position
UK Albums (Official Charts)	30
UK Album Downloads (Official Charts)	9
UK Independent Albums (Official Charts)	2
Scottish Albums (Official Charts)	8
