= Great American Song Contest =

Annual international music competition

The Great American Song Contest is an international music competition run annually by Songwriters Resource Network since 2000.

== Overview ==
The contest runs annually, organised by Songwriters Resource Network, an educational resource for songwriters, lyricists and composers. According to the book 2015 Songwriter's Market, the purpose of the contest includes helping songwriters develop their craft, market their songs and learn about songwriting opportunities It judges works from songwriters and lyricists, performance and production quality is not weighted.

It is notable because it is a long running competition run by songwriters for songwriters, composers and lyricists, it is facilitated by high profile industry players and is responsible for discovering, promoting and preserving important works, some examples:

- It recognised a song which now forms part of the Nelson Mandela Memorial Collection and another that went on to be used in Idols as well as in films,
- Judging and reviews are by people in the music industry like Pat Pattison, whose students have won Grammys, including John Mayer and Gillian Welch and Robin Frederick, former Director of A&R for Rhino Records, past president of Los Angeles Women In Music and co-founder of the Indie Nation Music Conference.
- John Stano's This Old Guitar from his Digging Out in the Heartland album that made the finals of “The Great American Song Contest.” charted on a Folk DJ list at #2 out of 100

Importantly, it offers the chance to co-write with top artists that have included Rodney Crowell, Ashley Monroe, Chris Stapleton, Bobby Braddock, Lee Brice and Mary Gauthier.

== Contest ==
Entries are limited to 5,000 per contest.

The stated aim is to identify and develop songwriting talent. Each entry receives feedback on the submitted work.

Artists submit work from a number of categories: Pop, Adult Contemporary, Folk/Americana, Singer/Songwriter, Country, Rock/Alt, Special, R&B/Hip Hop, Christian/Inspirational, Instrumental, Lyric Writing.

=== Prizes ===
Cash prizes on offer to winners are modest. Instead, winners are rewarded with memberships, access to CD services, songwriting software and other tools and information that may be useful for developing and marketing works, like a demo recording package and a co-write opportunity.

Grand and First Prize winners are listed on the Great American Song Hall of Fame to promote their songs to record labels, music publishers, producers and music media. The top 5 in each category are awarded an Outstanding Achievement in Songwriting Award.

=== Judging ===
Judging consists of three rounds:

Level One - All categories are judged by music-industry professionals selected for his or her expertise in specific style categories (Pop, Country, Folk, etc...)

Level Two - 100 songs (top 10 songs in each category) move to Level Two.

- Five songs from each are selected to receive Outstanding Achievement In Songwriting awards.
- Top song in each category wins a First Place Award and advances to compete for the Grand Prize.

Level Three - Grand Prize Winner is selected from the First Place category winners

== Winners ==
Notably, South African songwriters Kalla Bremer and Don Clarke won the Grand Prize in this competition in 2013 with "The Long Walk is Over/Ode to Nelson Mandela". A copy of the song is stored on CD and is now part of the Nelson Mandela Memorial Collection. Previously, This Is Our Time, a song that won the adult contemporary category became the official graduation song for UCLA Extension and was the debut single for the 2014 winner of Ottawa Idol, Bernice Reyes It was used in the films, like A Sunday Horse.

== Grand Prize winners ==
Year	Artist	Work	Country
2019	John Cirillo, Sarah Spencer & Troy Castellano	Lost Amen	US
2018	Ceri Earle & Chelsey Satterlee	In His Shirt	US
2017	Ruth Hill	Oh, Brother Mine	US
2016	Lisa Bastoni	Rabbit Hole	US
2015	J'Chelle	Mosaic	US
2014	Kevin Beadles	This Might Get Loud	US
2013	Don Clarke & Kalla Bremer	Long Walk is Over	South Africa
2012	Ed Romanoff, Crit Harmon & Josh Ritter	St Vincent de Paul	US
2011	Johnsmith	From his Window	US
2010	Michael McGarrah	Dancin' in the Boneyard	US
2009	essence / Jeffrey Pease	Feels like the Future	US
2008	Rachael Sage	Hunger in John	US
2007	Marla Lewis & Les Julian	Mighty Jackie (The Strikeout Queen)	US
2006	Kathy Hussey	The Same Mary	US
2005	Vougeot & Dave Pickell	Let it Burn	Canada
2004	Jenna Drey & Kevin Churko	Impossibility	US
2003	Shawn Vougeot & Dave Pickell	Walls of Glass	Canada
2002	Jim Bizer	We Are All Connected	US
2001	Devon Copley	The Wreck of You and Me	US
2000	Jennifer Marks	Fragile	US
1999	Patti Witten	Change Of Heart Church Choir	US

== Additional information ==
A music competition review rates the competition in the Top 5 Best (Legit) Songwriting Competitions.
