= Duncan Archibald Bruce =

American novelist

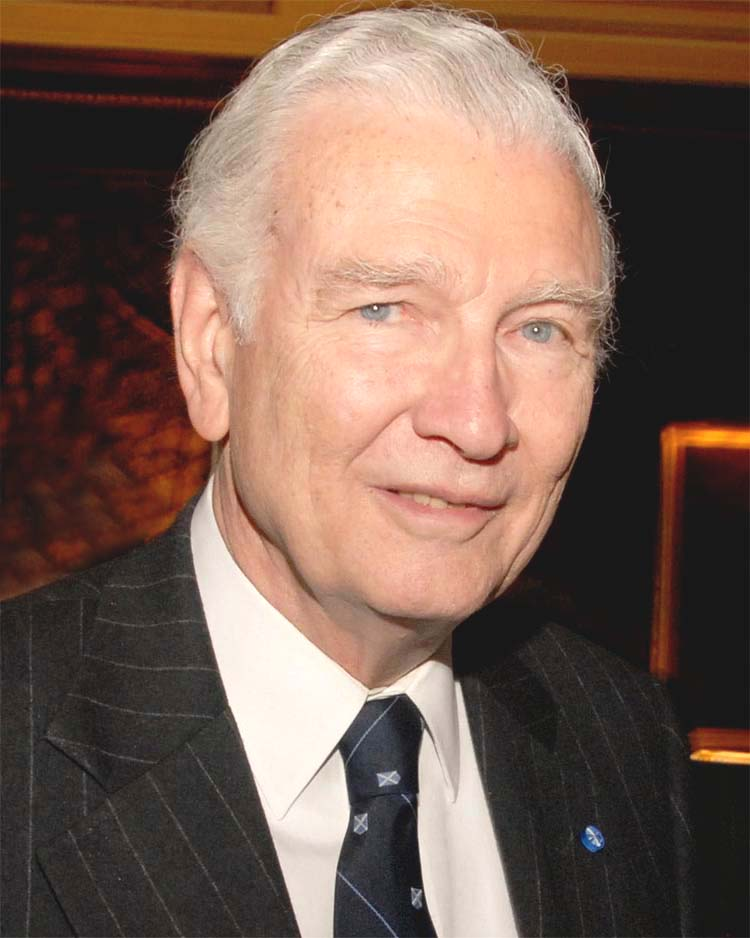
- Bruce in 2015
- Born: Duncan Archibald Bruce; February 19, 1932; Pittsburgh, Pennsylvania, U.S.
- Died: November 22, 2019 (aged 87); New York City, U.S.
- Education: Wharton School of the University of Pennsylvania
- Occupations: Author, Scottish historian
- Spouse: Tamara (née Kahan) Bruce (m. 1965; d. 2005)
- Children: Jenny Bruce, Elizabeth Bruce

Duncan Archibald Bruce (February 19, 1932 – November 22, 2019) was an American author of fiction and non-fiction novels, best known for his historical contribution to the history of Scotland and the Scots. He authored and published four books, The Mark of the Scots (1996), The Scottish 100 (2000), The Great Scot (2004) and Two Hundred Fifty Years; The History of St. Andrew’s Society of the State of New York, 1756-2006. He received a number of awards for his research and for sharing the historical accomplishments of the Scottish people. He was the father to daughters Jenny Bruce and Elizabeth Bruce.

== Early life ==
Bruce was born (February 19, 1932) in Pittsburgh, Pennsylvania to Archibald and Marian (née Colley) Bruce. He was the eldest of four siblings. He graduated from Edgewood High School near Pittsburgh and was class president and captain of the baseball team. In 1954, he graduated from the Wharton School of the University of Pennsylvania, and was a member of the Friars Senior Society, Alpha Tao Omega Fraternity, and The Mask and Wig Club.

Bruce's grandparents were Scottish Highland immigrants. His grandmother and grandfather founded a Presbyterian church in Johnstown, Pennsylvania. While being interviewed on his book, The Scottish 100, Duncan said, "I call my grandmother the only true Christian I have ever known and she taught me, on her knee, about what good the Jews had done and how wrong the Nazi persecution was... but the main point is that The National Covenant made the Scots a covenanted people like the Jews".

== Career ==
Bruce was affiliated with many Scottish American organizations and groups and was a recognized historian, author, and educator on the subject.

In 1998, he was awarded the Ellis Island Medal of Honor by the National Ethnic Coalition Organization for his research and contributions in documenting Scottish history in the United States. He was awarded the Wallace Award in 2011 by the American Scottish Foundation. Noted ASF chairman, Kenneth Donnelly said of Bruce, "Through his dedicated research and love for Scotland, Duncan educated us all on the real and meaningful contributions the Scots have made to America".

Bruce was the President of Edgewood Holdings, Inc. in New York City from 1989 to 2002, and then of Normandie Holdings, Ltd., in New York City from 1996 to 2008.

== Personal life ==
Bruce was married to his wife, Tamara, from December 4, 1965 until her death in April, 2005. They had two daughters, Jenny and Elizabeth. He resided in New York City until he died from complications related to Parkinson's disease on November 22, 2019.

== Publications ==
=== Books ===
- 1996 - The Mark of the Scots: Their Astonishing Contributions to History, Science, Democracy, Literature, and the Arts
- 2000 - The Scottish 100
- 2004 - The Great Scot: A Novel of Robert the Bruce, Scotland's Legendary Warrior King
- 2008 - Two Hundred Fifty Years; The History of St. Andrew’s Society of the State of New York, 1756-2006

=== Awards and recognition ===
- 1998 - Ellis Island Medal of Honor - National Ethnic Coalition Organization
- Commendation Award - the Scottish Parliament
- 2011 - Wallace Award - the American Scottish Foundation
- Scottish Heritage Award - St. Andrew's Society of New York
- National Tartan Day Award - the Scottish Coalition
- Listed as a Notable Investor and Writer by Marquis Who's Who

=== Affiliations ===
- 95th President of The Saint Andrew's Society New York
- Fellow Society Antiquaries of Scotland
- Member American Scottish Foundation (board of directors)
- Scottish Heritage United States of America (board of directors)
- 1990 - Honorary Chieftain, Bonnie Brae Scottish Games, Millington, New Jersey
- Mask and Wig Club

=== The Tartan Apple ===
Bruce contributed historical commentary in the TV movie The Tartan Apple.
