= Ash (album) =

Studio album by Ibeyi
- Released: 29 September 2017
- Recorded: November 2016
- Studios: The Copper House, London
- Genres: Alternative R&B; hip-hop; electronic pop; jazz; Yoruba; electrosoul; dancehall; minimal
- Length: 39:39
- Label: XL
- Producer: Richard Russell

Ibeyi chronology
Ibeyi (2015)	Ash (2017)	Spell 31 (2022)

Singles from Ash
- 1. "Away Away" Released: 9 June 2017; 2. "Deathless" Released: 31 August 2017; 3. "Me Voy" Released: 14 September 2017

Ash is the second studio album of French-Cuban R&B duo Ibeyi, consisting of twin sisters Lisa-Kaindé Diaz and Naomi Diaz. It was recorded in November 2016 and produced by Richard Russell. Ash differs from their self-titled first album for its more societal themes, features from high-profile artists such as Kamasi Washington, Meshell Ndegeocello, and Chilly Gonzales, and its upbeat tone. Ash has themes similar to those on Beyoncé's Lemonade (2016) and Solange's A Seat at the Table (2016) regarding racism, empowerment, and female problems. In presenting them, it uses samples from writings such as Claudia Rankine's Citizen: An American Lyric (2014), a diary by Frida Kahlo, and Michelle Obama's speech about Donald Trump and his sexual misconduct.

Ash was released on 29 September 2017 by XL Recordings and was critically well received in general. Multiple reviewers highlighted its uplifting take on political issues and its dynamic sound and style. However, some critics disliked the addition of electronic processing such as auto-tune as well as the preachy way it presented it messages. The album landed on the year-end lists of publications such as Pitchfork, Rolling Stone, Clash, and Exclaim!. Commercially, it peaked at number 19 on the French Albums Chart, and two of its songs, "Away Away" and "Deathless", reached number 175 and 190 on the French Singles Chart respectively.

== Production ==
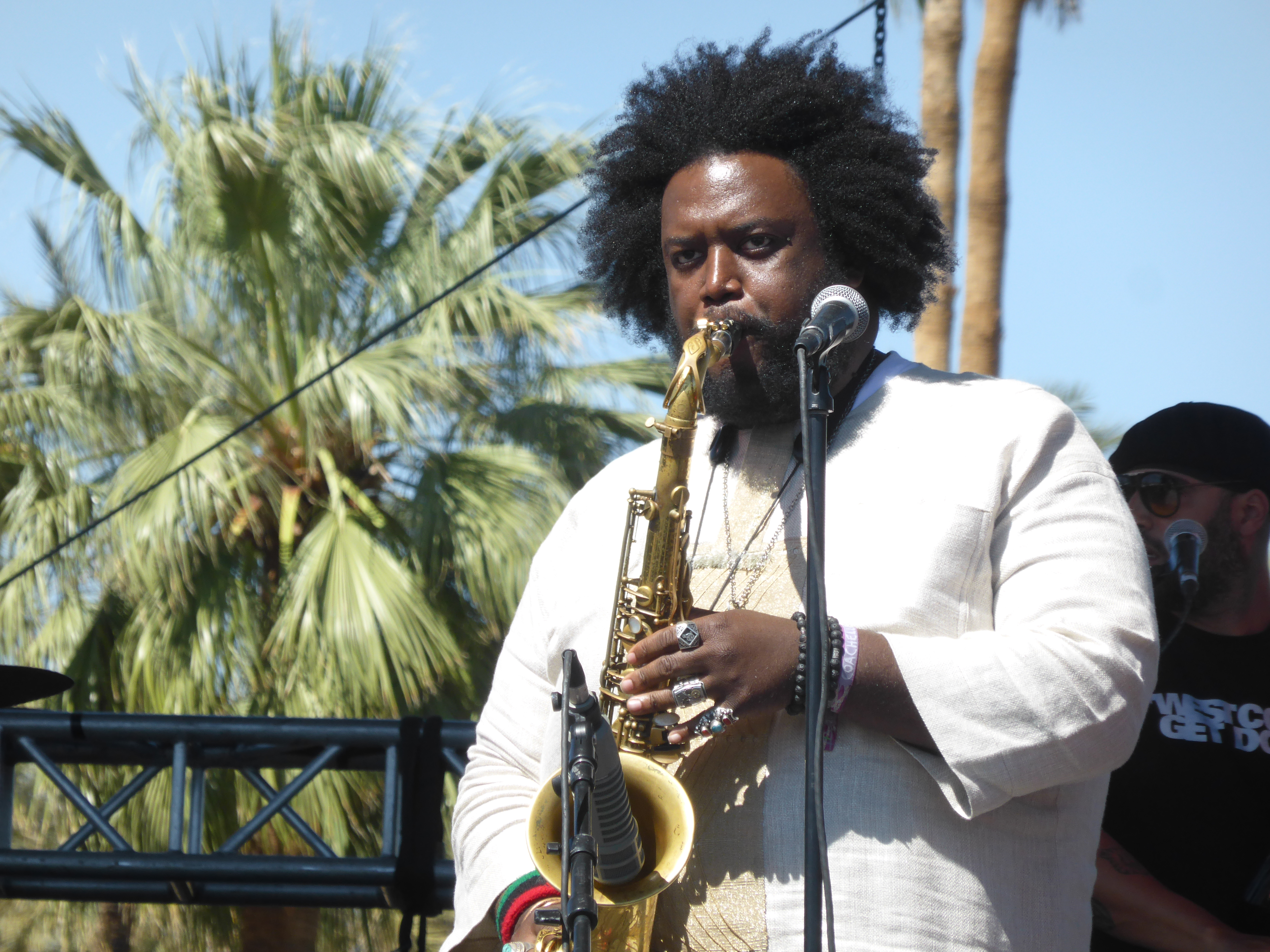
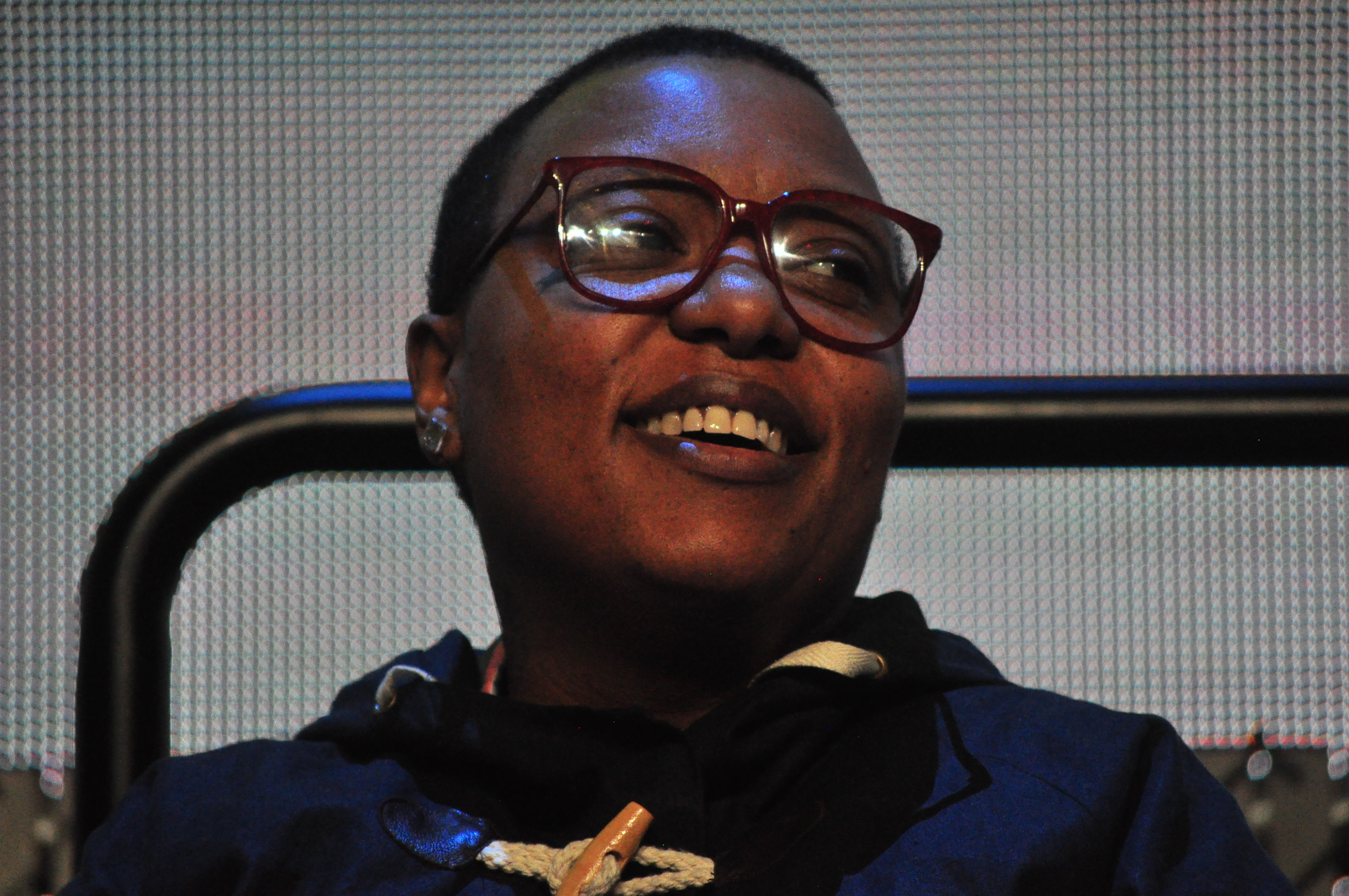
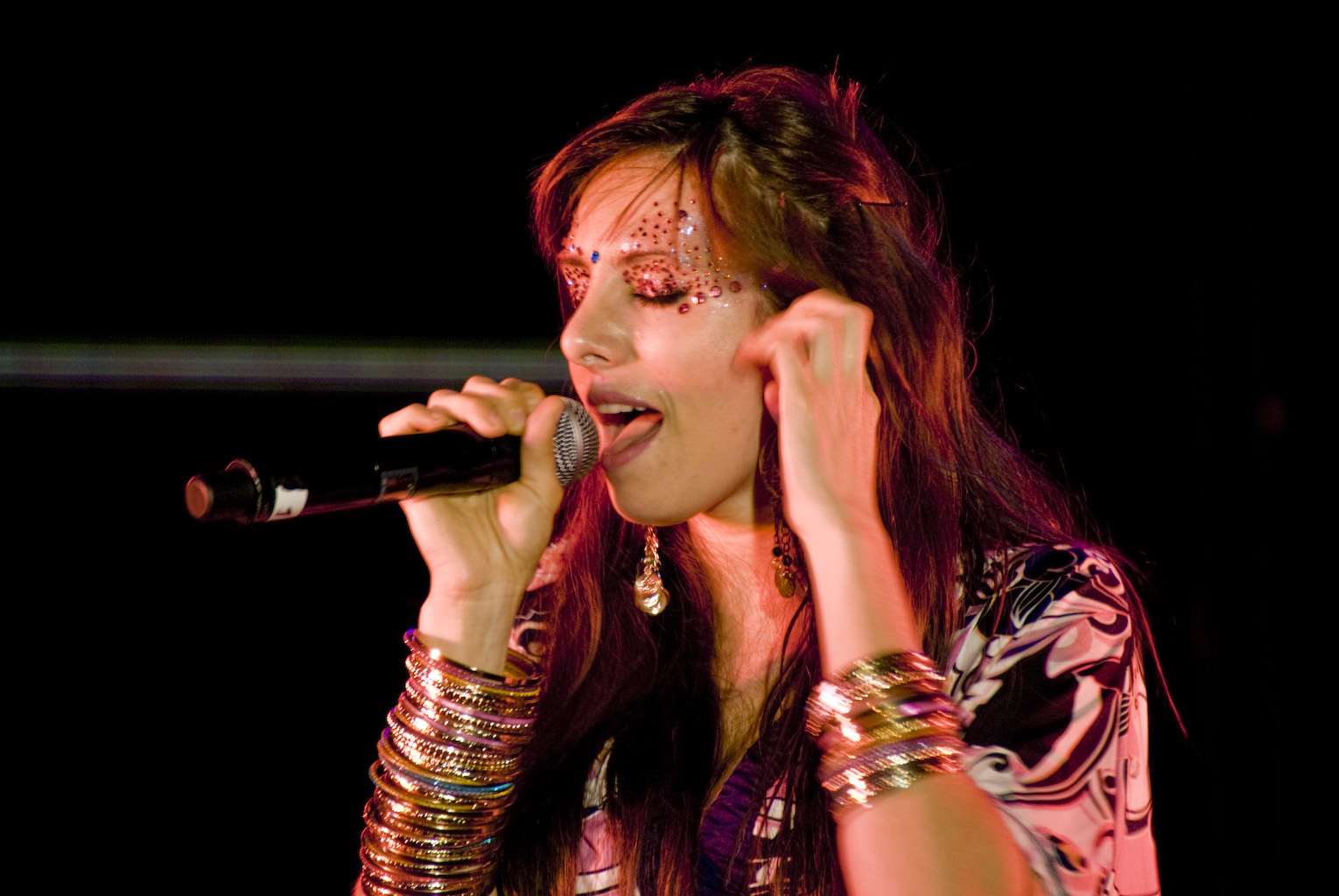
Kamasi Washington (left), Meshell Ndegeocello (center), and Mala Rodríguez (right) contributed to Ash.

Ibeyi wrote most of Ash while touring, one song, "I Wanna Be Like You", "written a long time ago", Ibeyi stated. "Numb" was originally made for an American television series, but Ibeyi claimed that it "didn't quite fit in the end" and landed on Ash's track listing. Produced by XL Recordings founder Richard Russel, Ash was tracked in November 2016 at his private London studio The Copper House.

Ash differs from Ibeyi's previous self-titled album for its use of auto-tune processing, its increased amount of lead vocal parts performed by Naomi, and performances from other well-known musicians. Lisa explained in a Stereogum interview that they used auto-tune because it was "really organic", "a way to lighten some words and leave some others in the shadows." Artists such as Spanish rapper Mala Rodríguez, American saxophonist Kamasi Washington, bassist Meshell Ndegeocello, and pianist Chilly Gonzales, one of Ibeyi's favorite artists, contributed to Ash. As Lisa stated in regards to Ndegeocello's work on the song "Transmission", "We couldn’t even really believe it and the fact that she’s on that song called Transmission, when we feel like she transmitted so much to us through her albums, we were absolutely delighted."

== Composition ==
"We know we can't change the world, but we do believe that our music brings hope, and that's the energy we transmit when we perform. For that hour and a half, we come together with our audience; we are one."

— Ibeyi on the purpose of Ash

While continuing the musical stylings of Ibeyi's self-titled LP, Ash has a brighter tone, and Lisa stated, "We made this album thinking about people at our shows, thinking about how to make them move, and how to make them sing loud and how to give them energy." As with the duo's first album, Ash features lyrics that are in the English and Yoruba languages and a Spanish song titled "Me Voy." The Skinny noted its use of "contrast and duality", in particular the differences between the timbre of the two Dias sisters, the variety of languages and tempos. The magazine used "Away Away" as an example, which has a dark instrumental that plays with an otherwise bright lead riff.

Ash also follows more societal topics than the personal themes on Ibeyi's previous record. Recorded during the 2016 presidential election and described by Vogue magazine as a "sounding board for global resistance," Ash deals with themes of racism, empowerment, and conditions related to being a female. The lyrical themes were compared to the works of Beyoncé, Solange, and Dev Hynes, "other artists who have met today’s emboldened hate with meditations on resilience and mindful resistance," Stacey Anderson wrote in a 2017 review. More specifically, the LP is similar to Beyoncé's Lemonade (2016) and Solange's A Seat at the Table (2016) for its method of combining personal emotions with political aspects. Anderson also analyzed, "At first, Ibeyi’s bright rhythms can feel deceptively stable, their harmonies uninhibited as they dip into dissonance, but they are deliberate in revealing the depth of their sadness." Writer Nadia Younes states that on Ash, "there’s a sense of grieving for humanity and society and they express an anger towards the way we treat each other while ultimately trying to remain hopeful for the future."

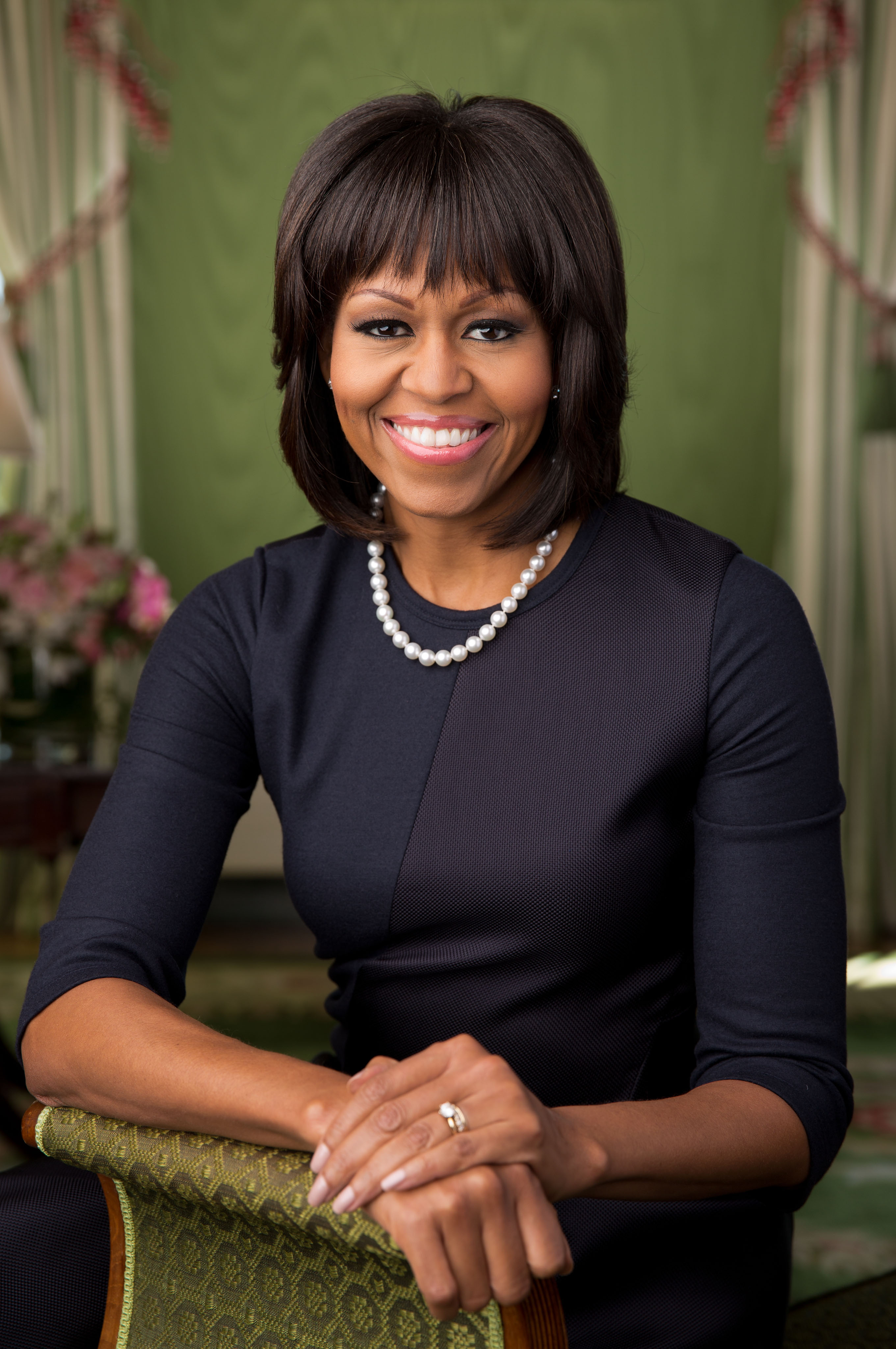
Michelle Obama's speech about Donald Trump and his behavior towards females is featured on "No Man Is Big Enough for My Arms."

Several of Ash's themes are presented via the use of references and samples to other works. The title of "No Man is Big Enough for My Arms" is a line Lisa read in Jennifer Clement's book Widow Basquiat: A Memoir (2000). Suzanne Mallouk says the line in the part of the novel where she's seven years old talking to an old man. The track includes audio snippets of a speech by Michelle Obama criticizing Donald Trump's misbehavior towards other women. The start and end of the song depicts Obama saying "The measure of any society is how it treats its women and girls," and original lyrics and more lines from the speech are performed together in the middle of the song. Naomi explained that "it was a powerful speech because it was not politics anymore. It was a woman talking to other women."

""Deathless" was inspired by me meeting a racist policeman when I was 16. I got arrested by this policeman and he said, "Do you smoke?" And I said, "No." And he said, "Do you drink?" And he would come closer after every question, and I said, "No." And he said, "Do you use drugs?" And I said, "No." And he said, "Are you f****** kidding me?" And then he took my bag and he threw it, and all my things were on the floor. And he froze for a second because he saw that I had a book. I think I was reading War and Peace, and I had Chopin. And I think he thought, "Oh, she might be intelligent and have something in her head." So he just gave me my empty bag and left."

— Lisa on the incident that inspired "Deathless"

"Deathless" is a song about racial profiling and is based on a time when Lisa Dias was searched by a policeman in Paris Metro at the age of 16. She sings, "He said, he said / You’re not clean / You might deal / All the same with that skin." The producer of Ash, XL owner Richard Russell, recommended Lisa to write a song based on the experience, but she was reluctant to do so at first, feeling it wasn't as "brutal or disturbing" as worse events she had seen reported in the news. However, Naomi then told her, "You don’t have to be raped or killed or pushed in order to say something, what happened to you is already wrong and enough," which influenced both sisters to write "Deathless."

The choir-heavy rumba song "Transmission" include samples of Claudia Rankine reading parts of her novel Citizen: An American Lyric (2014) and Naomi and Lisa-Kaindé Diaz's mother Maya Dagnino reading lines from a diary by Frida Kahlo. Lisa felt it was one of Ash's most "important" cuts, claiming that it's "about everything we believe in. We believe in transmission. We believe in saying to people this is how I felt, this is me. Thank God I have music! Thank God!" She also said that it regarded "Not only saying how you feel, but looking at how people are feeling around you and trying to understand them; finding what links us more than what divides us. Then, learning from our past and learning from other people’s past and learning from history, which is really hard." Noisey states that "Vale", a "lullaby" for a daughter of the duo's deceased sister Yanira, is meant to "offer hope to a younger generation of women. Women who have to grow up in the tumultuous current times that have shaped much of this album."

== Release and promotion ==
In an article for The Fader published on 4 May 2017, Anupa Mistry revealed that she listened to a rough mix of the yet-untitled second Ibeyi album while interviewing the duo at their Havana home. She noted that it consisted of "crystalline parallel harmonies and minimalist Latin percussion that Russell embellishes with drum machines and twinkling synth lines" and also announced the musicians featured on it. It was also revealed that it was going to be more "playful" and less "emotional" than Ibeyi's self-titled debut. The lead single of Ibeyi's second album, "Away Away" (which a snippet of was released on Ibeyi's Instagram on 7 June 2017) was issued on 9 June 2017. The Fader premiered its video, which depicts Ibeyi singing and dancing in a recording studio, the same day.

On 31 August 2017, the title of the album was announced as Ash and "Deathless" and its music video were released. The video, directed by Ed Morris, is a surrealistic depiction of a woman giving birth to a child. The third single and video from Ash, "Me Voy", was released on 14 September 2017. The video depicts Ibeyi and Mala Rodríguez dancing on colorful stages. A video for "I Wanna Be Like You", directed by Remi Besse, was released 28 September 2017 and depicts the Dias sisters "as each other's opposite", Under the Rader magazine stated. XL Recordings finally distributed Ash on 29 September 2017.

== Reception ==
Professional ratings
Aggregate scores
Source	Rating
AnyDecentMusic?	7.6/10
Metacritic	78/100
Review scores
Source	Rating
AllMusic	4/5 stars
Clash	8/10
Drowned in Sound	8/10
Exclaim!	7/10
The Observer	3/5 stars
Pitchfork	8.3/10
PopMatters	9/10
Q	3/5 stars
The Skinny	4/5 stars
The Times	3/5 stars

Many critics praised how Ash handled its political themes, more specifically its uplifting tone in doing so. Adriane Pontecorvo of Popmatters was enthusiastic towards Ibeyi's "unquestionable virtuosity" in presenting its messages, also claiming that they "show far older, wiser souls than most of their peers." The album garnered a "Best New Music" label from Pitchfork, where Anderson claimed, "Ibeyi could have laid down, many times over, in the ashes of their idealism. Instead, with the same ascendant spirit, with soaring harmonies and conviction, they continue to smile, and they defy. They rise."

An AllMusic journalist praised Ash for being "many things: militant, vulnerable, and tender; it is urgent yet unhurried, its sharp edges unapologetically exposed. It is rooted in struggles and seeks victory, not deliverance. It is not only memorable, but indomitable and beautiful." Drowned in Sound applauded the LP for being "characterised by defiance: rather than wallowing, it soberly reflects; rather than crying it howls." He also praised it for having "a true sense of journey through its beginning, middle and end, an element often disregarded in an industry gluttonously obsessed with hit singles."

Another common praise was Ash's dynamic sound and style. Houston Chronicle writer Andrew Dansby called it his third favorite album of 2017, reasoning that it was "more striking and assertive in establishing a sonic identity that pulls from points near, far and further" than Ibeyi's first album. Now critic Chaka V. Grier called Ash a "dynamic experience", also claiming it "can only emerge from the souls and mouths of these two sisters, an organic extension of their lives, beliefs and traditions." However, she found it "preachy" and "heavy-handed" in a few moments. Q magazine also felt the record's themes were "glib" and "never quite strikes the right note."

Critic Kitty Empire felt Ash was weaker than Ibeyi's self-titled record in that it sacrificed the Yoruba element of it for "just-so production", unoriginal political themes, and performances from guest musicians. God is in the TV panned the use of auto-tune of the album, reasoning that it "devalues the beauty of [the duo's] pure and humble personalities," "takes away their harmonic uniqueness and replaces it with a sound that threatens to blend in with chart-topping radio-friendly credentials." The Times also disliked the addition of more electronic processing in Ibeyi's style, reasoning that the album does not have "enough of the elegantly soulful Cuban lightness the twins evoked so well."

== Year-end list rankings ==
Ash

In The Village Voice's Pazz & Jop, an poll regarding the best albums of the year as voted by more than 400 American music critics, Ash tied with Beach House 3 (2017) by Ty Dolla Sign at number 87, garnering 85 points.

Publication	Rank
AllMusic (R&B)	*
Clash	20
Exclaim! (Soul and R&B)	8
Les Inrockuptibles	36
Mashable	10
Pazz & Jop	87
Piccadilly Records	77
Pitchfork	28
Pitchfork (Pop and R&B)	6
The Quietus (Pop)	*
Rolling Stone (Latin)	*
"*" indicates an unordered list.

"Me Voy"

Publication	Rank
Billboard (Latin)	16

== Track listing ==
Track lengths derived from Apple Music.

No.	Title	Writer(s)	Length
1.	"I Carried This for Years"	Lisa Kainde Diaz, Mariyka Va Kuteva, Philip Kutev	1:34
2.	"Away Away"	Lisa Kainde Diaz, Maya Dagnino	2:59
3.	"Deathless" (featuring Kamasi Washington)	Lisa Kainde Diaz	3:11
4.	"I Wanna Be Like You"	Lisa Kainde Diaz, Maya Dagnino	2:37
5.	"No Man Is Big Enough for My Arms"	Bruce Gray, Bruce Hawes, Lisa Kainde Diaz, Maya Dagnino	2:26
6.	"Valé"	Lisa Kainde Diaz	3:26
7.	"Waves"	Lisa Kainde Diaz, Naomi Diaz, Richard Russell	3:14
8.	"Transmission" / "Michaelion" (featuring Meshell Ndegeocello)	Claudia Rankine, Lisa Kainde Diaz, Maya Dagnino	6:30
9.	"Me Voy" (featuring Mala Rodríguez)	Mala Rodríguez, Lisa Kainde Diaz, Maria Rodriguez	3:07
10.	"When Will I Learn" (featuring Chilly Gonzales)	Lisa Kainde Diaz, Maya Dagnino	3:00
11.	"Numb"	Lisa Kainde Diaz	3:47
12.	"Ash"	Lisa Kainde Diaz	3:48
Total length:			39:39

Sample credits

- "I Carried This for Years" samples "Dragan I Slavei" by the Bulgarian State Television Female Vocal Choir.
- The name is "No Man Is Big Enough for My Arms" a line from Jennifer Clement's Widow Basquiat: A Memoir (2000).
- "Transmission" include audio snippets of Claudia Rankine reading parts of her novel Citizen: An American Lyric (2014) and Naomi and Lisa-Kaindé Diaz's mother Maya Dagnino reading lines from a diary by Frida Kahlo.
- "No Man Is Big Enough for My Arms" samples an October 2016 speech by Michelle Obama criticizing Donald Trump's misbehavior towards other women.
- "Ash" samples lyrics of a prayer to Elegua from another Ibeyi track named "Eleggua."

== Personnel ==
Derived from the liner notes of Ash.

- Written and composed by Lisa-Kaindé Diaz
- Arranged by Naomi Diaz
- Produced and mixed by Richard Russell
- Engineered and mixed by John Foyle
- Choir on "Deathless", "No Man Is Big Enough for My Arms", "Waves", "Transmission", and "Michaelion" by the IDMC Gospel Choir
- Piano on "I Wanna Be Like You", "Me Voy", and "When Will I Learn" by Chilly Gonzales
- Saxophone on "Deathless" by Kamasi Washington
- Bass on "Transmission" and "Michaelion" by Meshell Ndegeocello
- Rap on "Me Voy" by Mala Rodriguez
- Mastered by Chris Allgood and Emily Lazar

== Charts ==
=== Album ===
Chart (2017)	Peak position
Belgian Albums (Ultratop Flanders)	48
Belgian Albums (Ultratop Wallonia)	73
French Albums (SNEP)	19
Swiss Albums (Schweizer Hitparade)	47
UK Official Record Store Chart (OCC)	36
US Heatseekers Albums (Billboard)	13
US Independent Albums (Billboard)	40

=== Singles ===
Title	Year	Peak chart positions		
Title	Year	FRA	BEL (Fl) Tip	BEL (Wa) Tip
"Away Away"	2017	175	48	—
"Deathless" (featuring Kamasi Washington)	2017	190	—^{[a]}	—^{[b]}

Notes

- a "Deathless" entered the Flanders Ultratip chart as one of the non-ranked 50 below the ranked top 50.
- b "Deathless" entered the Wallonia Ultratip chart as one of the non-ranked 50 below the ranked top 50.
