= Everything Is Recorded by Richard Russell =

Studio album by Everything Is Recorded
- Released: 16 February 2018
- Length: 37:59
- Label: XL
- Producer: Richard Russell

Everything Is Recorded chronology
| Everything Is Recorded by Richard Russell (2018) | Friday Forever (2020) |

Everything Is Recorded by Richard Russell is the debut studio album by Everything Is Recorded, a project of British record producer Richard Russell. It was released on 16 February 2018 through his record label XL Recordings. It received generally favorable reviews from critics.

== Background ==
Everything Is Recorded by Richard Russell is Everything Is Recorded's debut studio album. It features guest appearances from Sampha, Obongjayar, Kamasi Washington, Giggs, Ibeyi, Wiki, Syd, Rachel Zeffira, Infinite Coles, Green Gartside, Peter Gabriel, and Owen Pallett. It was recorded at Richard Russell's West London studio, the Copper House. In a 2018 interview, when asked about the inspiration behind the album, Russell stated, "I think the Soul II Soul and Massive Attack thing is absolutely relevant, yes."

== Critical reception ==
Professional ratings
Aggregate scores
| Source | Rating |
|---|---|
| Metacritic | 75/100 |
Review scores
| Source | Rating |
| AllMusic | 3.5/5 stars |
| Clash | 8/10 |
| Exclaim! | 8/10 |
| The Observer | 3/5 stars |
| Pitchfork | 7.2/10 |
| Record Collector | 4/5 stars |
| Under the Radar | 8/10 stars |

According to the review aggregator Metacritic, Everything Is Recorded by Richard Russell received "generally favorable reviews" based on a weighted average score of 75 out of 100 from 10 critic scores.

Ian Gormely of Exclaim! stated, "Fitting XL's eclectic roster, Everything Is Recorded by Richard Russell touches on dub, soul, UK garage and bass music, among many other sounds." He added, "Even if at times he's somewhat overshadowed by his collaborators, Russell manages to have his voice shine through." Gareth James of Clash commented that "Diverse talents are woven together with ease by a man with an encyclopaedic knowledge of how music can affect us." Michael Watkins of Under the Radar called the album "a mixture of 12 tracks that are warm, vibrant, and surprisingly cohesive."

The album was shortlisted for the 2018 Mercury Prize.

=== Accolades ===
Year-end lists for Everything Is Recorded by Richard Russell
| Publication | List | Rank | Ref. |
|---|---|---|---|
| Q | Top 50 Albums of 2018 | 43 | |
| Rough Trade | Albums of the Year 2018 | 2 | |

== Track listing ==
Everything Is Recorded by Richard Russell track listing
| No. | Title | Length |
|---|---|---|
| 1. | "Intro" | 1:44 |
| 2. | "Close but Not Quite" (featuring Sampha) | 3:25 |
| 3. | "She Said" (featuring Obongjayar and Kamasi Washington) | 3:15 |
| 4. | "Wet Looking Road" (featuring Giggs) | 2:52 |
| 5. | "Mountains of Gold" (featuring Sampha, Ibeyi, Wiki, and Kamasi Washington) | 3:55 |
| 6. | "Show Love" (featuring Syd and Sampha) | 3:17 |
| 7. | "Echoes in the Bone (Interlude)" (featuring Rachel Zeffira) | 1:00 |
| 8. | "Bloodshot Red Eyes" (featuring Infinite Coles and Green Gartside) | 3:57 |
| 9. | "Cane" (featuring Ibeyi) | 3:33 |
| 10. | "Purify (Interlude)" (featuring Infinite Coles and Peter Gabriel) | 1:35 |
| 11. | "Be My Friend" (featuring Infinite Coles) | 4:19 |
| 12. | "Everything Is Recorded" (featuring Sampha and Owen Pallett) | 5:07 |
| Total length: | | 37:59 |

== Charts ==
Chart performance for Everything Is Recorded by Richard Russell
| Chart (2018) | Peak position |
|---|---|
| UK Albums (OCC) | 66 |
| UK Independent Albums (OCC) | 8 |
