= Mary in the Junkyard =

British rock band

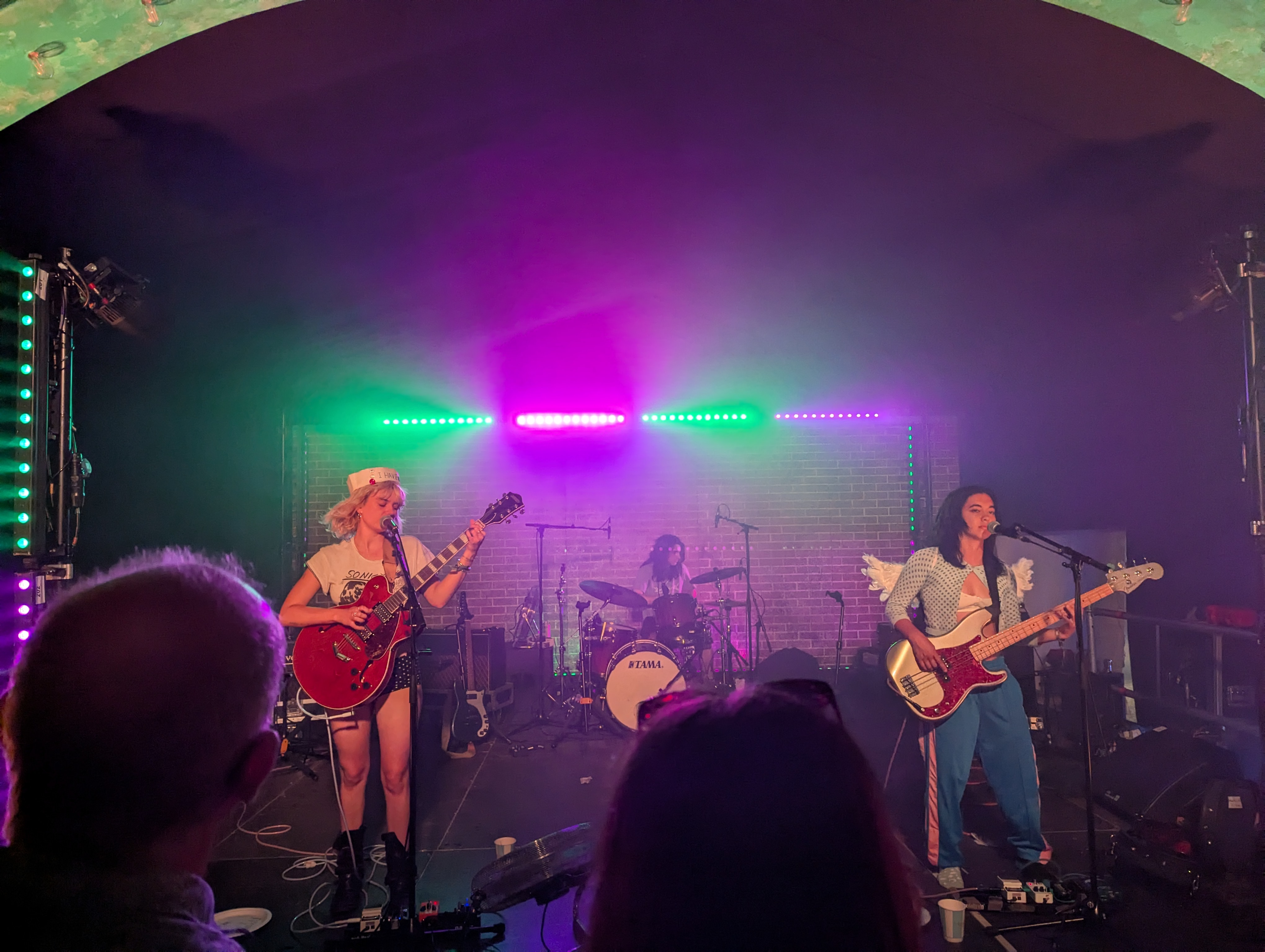
- Performing at Wilderness Festival in 2025.

Background information
- Origin: London, England
- Genres: Indie rock; art rock
- Years active: 2022–present
- Label: AMF Records
- Members: Clari Freeman-Taylor; Saya Barbaglia; David Addison
- Website: maryinthejunkyard.tmstor.es

Mary in the Junkyard (stylized in all lowercase) are a British band from London. The band consists of vocalist and guitarist Clari Freeman-Taylor, viola and bass player Saya Barbaglia and drummer David Addison. The band are signed with All My Friends (AMF) Records. They have been compared to Adrianne Lenker and Wolf Alice.

== History ==
The band began while all three members were teenagers. Freeman-Taylor and Barbaglia first met at a classical music summer camp, aged 14, when they were assigned by a camp counsellor to perform a piece together. Freeman-Taylor and Addison knew each other from their time as part of the band Second Thoughts.

In 2022, Freeman-Taylor managed to get a gig at the Cavendish Arms in Stockwell, for which she enlisted Barbaglia and Addison to be a part of her band; this effectively became the first Mary in the Junkyard performance. Following this, the band soon became a regular name on the billing at The Windmill, Brixton.

When the band was still new, they all lived together, along with the Little Grandad guitarist Ned Ashcroft.

Before forming Little Grandad, Jack Lower, the lead singer and bassist of the band, was their tour manager.

In 2024, during a show in New York they mentioned on stage that they were in need of a place to stay. The band ended up staying with Todd Eckert, who attended the show, and his partner Marina Abramović. Since then the band have played a private show for them and their peers, and become "firm friends" with Abramović.

In 2025, they supported Wet Leg on their "Moisturizer" tour.

=== Releases ===
In October 2023, they released their first single, "Tuesday", alongside a music video. The song was recorded the previous December, and has become a staple ending for the band's live shows.

In February 2024, the 2nd single, "Ghost", was released, followed shortly by a music video directed by Freeman-Taylor and Rhory Danniells. In May, the band released their debut EP titled This Old House—including "Ghost", and "Tuesday" on vinyl—produced by Richard Russell, the head of XL Recordings. Alongside the announcement of their EP in March, the band released the single "Marble Arch".

In November 2024, the band released a new song titled "This Is My California"—produced by Craig Silvey, who has worked with the Rolling Stones and Florence + the Machine—and in December 2024 the band released the song "Bear Walk".

In 2025, Freeman-Taylor was featured on the song "Swamp Dream #3" by Everything Is Recorded, as part of the album Temporary. Later that year, they released the singles "Drains" and "Midori"—both concert staples—followed by music videos for each.

In July 2026, the band released their debut album Role Model Hermit, it featured singles "Crash Landing", "Candelabra", "New Muscles", "Mouse", and "Blood". The album was produced by Oli Bayston, in his studio during the summer of 2025, and by Ben Baptie. The cover for the album was born by a collaboration with creative director Daisy Ayscough and it features Freeman-Taylor wearing prosthetics in order to resemble the character from their song "Mouse". The song "New Muscles" was originally written on the accordion and is reportedly "about David [Addison] joining a gym". The music video for the song was directed by Barbaglia, Daisy Ayscough, and Luke Grieve, and depicts a fight between Barbaglia and Freeman-Taylor. There is also a music video for the song "Blood".

== Discography ==
- This Old House (EP) (2024)
- Role Model Hermit (2026)

=== Singles ===
Title	Year	Album
"Tuesday"	2023	Non-album single
"Ghost"	2024	This Old House
"Marble Arch"	2024	This Old House
"This Is My California"	2024	Non-album singles
"Bear Walk"	2024	Non-album singles
"Drains"	2025	Non-album singles
"Midori	2025	Non-album singles
"Crash Landing"	2026	Role Model Hermit
"Candelabra"	2026	Role Model Hermit
"New Muscles"	2026	Role Model Hermit
"Mouse"	2026	Role Model Hermit
"Blood"	2026	Role Model Hermit
"Jane"	2026	Non-album single
