= Erotic Probiotic 2 =

Studio album by Nourished by Time
- Released: April 21, 2023
- Studio: Brown's parents' basement
- Genre: Freestyle; R&B; bedroom pop
- Length: 34:13
- Language: English
- Label: Scenic Route
- Producer: Marcus Brown

Nourished by Time chronology
Erotic Probiotic EP (2022)	Erotic Probiotic 2 (2023)	Catching Chickens (2024)

Singles from Erotic Probiotic 2
- 1. "Quantum Suicide" Released: February 16, 2023; 2. "Daddy" Released: March 15, 2023; 3. "The Fields" Released: April 12, 2023

Erotic Probiotic 2 is the debut studio album by American singer and record producer Marcus Brown under the alias Nourished by Time, released on April 21, 2023, through Scenic Route Records. The album was written, recorded, and produced by Brown in the basement of his parents' home in Baltimore. Encompassing multiple genres, it explores themes of anti-capitalism, heartbreak, spirituality, and depression. It received acclaim from critics, being ranked on several lists of the best albums of 2023.

== Background and recording ==
Marcus Elliot Brown was born and raised in Baltimore. He learned to play the guitar around the age of 15 after discovering a video of Slash soloing alongside Michael Jackson, and played in his high school's marching band, symphonic band, and jazz band. He entered into the Berklee College of Music at the age of 17. He has stated that the only professor at the college who appreciated his approach to music was Pat Pattison. After graduating, he moved back to Baltimore and worked at Barnes & Noble. He eventually saved enough money to move to Los Angeles, living in the Koreatown neighborhood. While in Los Angeles, he began to release more music under a number of aliases, including Riley With Fire and Mother Marcus, before adopting the name Nourished by Time. Brown moved back to Baltimore in 2023. He opened for Dry Cleaning's 2023 tour in support of Stumpwork and remixed the song “Gary Ashby” from the band's Swampy EP. He also featured on Yaeji's 2023 With a Hammer, on the song "Happy".

Brown recorded the album in the basement of his parents' home in Baltimore. The album was entirely written, mixed, recorded, and produced by Brown with a self-described budget of $0. During the recording of the album, Brown was sick with COVID-19, which led to the album's mixing and singing to be "not up to his standard." He has described the album as "just a ball of emotion", as he had recently ended a relationship and was working at Whole Foods for low pay. Brown is a socialist and his experience with the capitalist 9 to 5 system inspired much of his music. Brown used a Roland Juno-106 synthesizer, which he purchased after an investment in Dogecoin, an Omnisphere synthesizer, and an electric guitar to produce the album. His recording process for most songs starts with writing the songs on the guitar or synthesizer, then putting the recording into Ableton to add drums and harmonies. He originally intended for it to be a visual album. On the album's title, Brown described an "erotic probiotic" as "a beverage you drink when you wanna be reborn and jump timelines, which is what happened to me in a way."

== Composition ==
The album has been described as genre-defying, encompassing elements of genres including: contemporary R&B, bedroom pop, freestyle, soul, new jack swing, post-punk, sophisti-pop, new wave, electro-funk, synth-pop, shoegaze, hip house, Miami bass, deep house, Baltimore club, neo soul, experimental pop, electronica, funk, indie pop, and alternative R&B. Brown sings in a baritone voice on the album.

The opening track, "Quantum Suicide", features Brown singing about fighting depression over a "melancholic guitar fog," "fuzzy shoegaze guitar riffs, glimmering synths," "expressive whispers, shouts, coos, and moans," which Beats per Minute described as "a revalation, a banger and a prayer." "Shed That Fear" is a song about perseverance with a meditative chorus about mortality and a synth-driven bounce. "Daddy" tells the story of Brown losing a partner to a wealthy sugar daddy. The song begins as an uptempo disco-pop song with a synth-driven bounce, "pulsing" drum programming, and ascendant harmonies on a house beat and a "cheery" hip house rap verse. The second part of the song turns "into an icy, Depeche Mode-esque breakdown" with "nocturnal" synths and a "sour" guitar melody with more forlorn lyrics. "The Fields" sees Brown comparing consumerism and capitalism to modern churches with lyrics such as: "Once or twice I prayed to Jesus/Never heard a word back in plain English/More like signs or advertisements/Telling me to keep consumerizing" over "skittering hi-hats, snappy snares, and [a] buoyant bassline." "Rain Water Promise" features lyrics about fighting feelings of resentment and longing after the end of a relationship in a "flurry of synth arpeggios and strings." "Soap Party" is about being afraid to make a move in a relationship and has "misty key melodies and propulsive drums," with Beats per Minute describing it as having a "darker, more introverted vibe." "Workers Interlude" features lyrics about "the personal and historical realities of the oppressed" and "finding freedom in a capitalist society built off the back of enslaved people." "Unbreak My Love" is a "R&B-laced closer" about the end of a relationship.

== Release and promotion ==
On February 16, 2023, Brown announced the album and released its lead single, "Quantum Suicide", along with a self-directed music video for the song. On March 15, 2023, the album's second single, "Daddy", was released. Brown also released a live performance version of the song filmed in his parents' basement. Brown released the album's third and final single, "The Fields", on April 12, 2023, accompanied with a music video for the song. The critical acclaim of Erotic Probiotic 2 helped Brown sign a deal with XL Recordings in 2024, and on January 24, 2025, the album was re-released on vinyl under the label.

After the album's release, he opened for Vagabon's 2023 tour in support of Sorry I Haven't Called. Brown performed at Pitchfork Music Festival 2023 in Union Park, Chicago on July 21, 2023. He performed at Ground Control Touring's annual abortion access benefit concert series in the Bowery Ballroom in Manhattan, New York City on January 20, 2024.

== Critical reception ==
Professional ratings
Review scores
Source	Rating
The Guardian	5/5 stars
Pitchfork	8.2/10

Pitchfork named it "Best New Music", with the site's Stephen Kearse describing it as playing like "a sampler of a time-warped '80s that took place entirely in Brown's head" as well as "freestyle through a buoyant, time-warped haze" and "both captivating and elusive." Exclaim!'s staff named it a pick upon release and called it "a wonderland, a lushly and unselfconsciously rendered world of deep blues and purples" with Brown combining "glittery freestyle, lean post-punk and sweeping Blue Nile-esque sophistipop into his own potent blend." The publication also ranked "Daddy" as the 23rd best song of 2023. Chris Richards of The Washington Post described it as a "strange and superb debut album" influenced by "early '90s R&B, the outsider pop of Arthur Russell, house music, club music, his studies at Berklee College of Music and the singular weirdo ambiance of Baltimore itself." Laura Snapes of The Guardian wrote that the album's "themes of sex, socialism and subjugation hit hard but never weigh heavy, couched in fuzzily buoyant, earwormy choruses that are almost as affirming as classic Lionel Richie or Barry White refrains."

Pitchfork ranked it the fifth best album of 2023, writing that its "anti-heartbreak, pro-labor, loosely spiritual jams are made for the softest, loungiest club or doing the wavy-arm dance on your couch." Paste ranked it the 17th best album of 2023, writing that its "blend of '90s R&B and '80s freestyle is so impressive because it appears to have arrived fully formed. For such a bare-bones operation, its fruits overwhelm." Gorilla vs. Bear ranked it the best album of 2023, calling it "a refreshing, genre-defying outlier" that "sounds like no one but Nourished by Time, as Brown conjures a magical, one-of-a-kind modern synthesis of '90s R&B, '80s freestyle, bedroom pop, and soul that transcends any and all of his myriad influences." The A.V. Club ranked it the 14th best album of 2023, with Drew Gillis writing that "it often conjures the feeling of staying up too late, too young, when the cartoons on TV turn from innocent to frightening." Dash Lewis of Bandcamp Daily praised the album as "a beautifully timely record, managing to feel both alien and relatable, a nostalgia-tinted pop record that could only have come from right now." Beats Per Minute ranked it the 37th best album of 2023, with Ethan Reis writing that Brown "averts current pop's too-many-cooks syndrome, while still containing songs as catchy and hummable as any pop artist." The Fader ranked it the 43rd best album of 2023, with David Renshaw writing that it blends its different sounds "into something you can always dance to." Piccadilly Records ranked the album as the 11th best of 2023, writing that it "offers inspired commentary on consumerism and capitalism as the modern churches of religion, [...] whilst also covering more intangible and existential subjects such as break-ups, longing and fighting despair." Tobias Hess of Paper praised the album's themes of "romantic yearning, being broke, fear of death, capitalism" as "both expansive and intimate" and that Brown's "wry lyricism and warbling baritone delivers lines that hit like a soft punch, harsh but sweet." Stereogum ranked it the 34th best album of 2023, with Arielle Gordon describing it as Brown's "version of Sam Cooke's protest anthem, sneaking capitalist critiques and existential longing into the peak-time energy of freestyle and Baltimore club" and that his "baritone cloaks the album in warmth without veering into sentimentality, like a roller rink DJ performing in your dreams. The Vinyl Factory described the album as "a magnificent slice of outsider pop" that is "awash with noir hues."

=== Year-end lists ===
Select year-end rankings of Erotic Probiotic 2
Critic/Publication	List	Rank	Ref.
The A.V. Club	The 27 best albums of 2023	14	
Bandcamp Daily	The Best Albums of 2023	—N/a	
Beats Per Minute	BPM's Top 50 Albums of 2023	37	
The Fader	The 50 best albums of 2023	43	
Gorilla vs. Bear	Gorilla vs. Bear's Albums of 2023	1	
Loud and Quiet	Albums of the Year 2023	39	
Paper	Favorite Albums of 2023	—N/a	
Paste	The 50 Best Albums of 2023	17	
Paste	The 30 Best Debut Albums of 2023	2	
Paste	The 30 Best Pop Albums of 2023	—N/a	
Piccadilly Records	End of Year Review Top 100 Albums	11	
Pitchfork	The 50 Best Albums of 2023	5	
Pitchfork	The Best Pop Music of 2023	—N/a	
Stereogum	The 50 Best Albums Of 2023	34	
The Vinyl Factory	Our favourite albums of 2023	—N/a	
The Washington Post	The best albums of 2023	7	

== Track listing ==
All lyrics are written by Marcus Brown; all music is composed by Marcus Brown.

Erotic Probiotic 2 track listing
No.	Title	Length
1.	"Quantum Suicide"	3:45
2.	"Shed That Fear"	3:23
3.	"Daddy"	4:06
4.	"Interlude"	0:58
5.	"The Fields"	3:52
6.	"Rain Water Promise"	5:07
7.	"Soap Party"	5:43
8.	"Workers Interlude"	2:11
9.	"Unbreak My Love"	5:08
Total length:		34:13

== Release history ==
Release history for Erotic Probiotic 2
Region	Date	Label(s)	Format(s)	Edition	Ref.
Various	April 21, 2023	Scenic Route	Digital download; streaming	Standard	
Various	April 21, 2023	Scenic Route	LP	Standard	
Various	January 24, 2025	XL	LP	Standard	
