= Ibeyi =

French musical duo

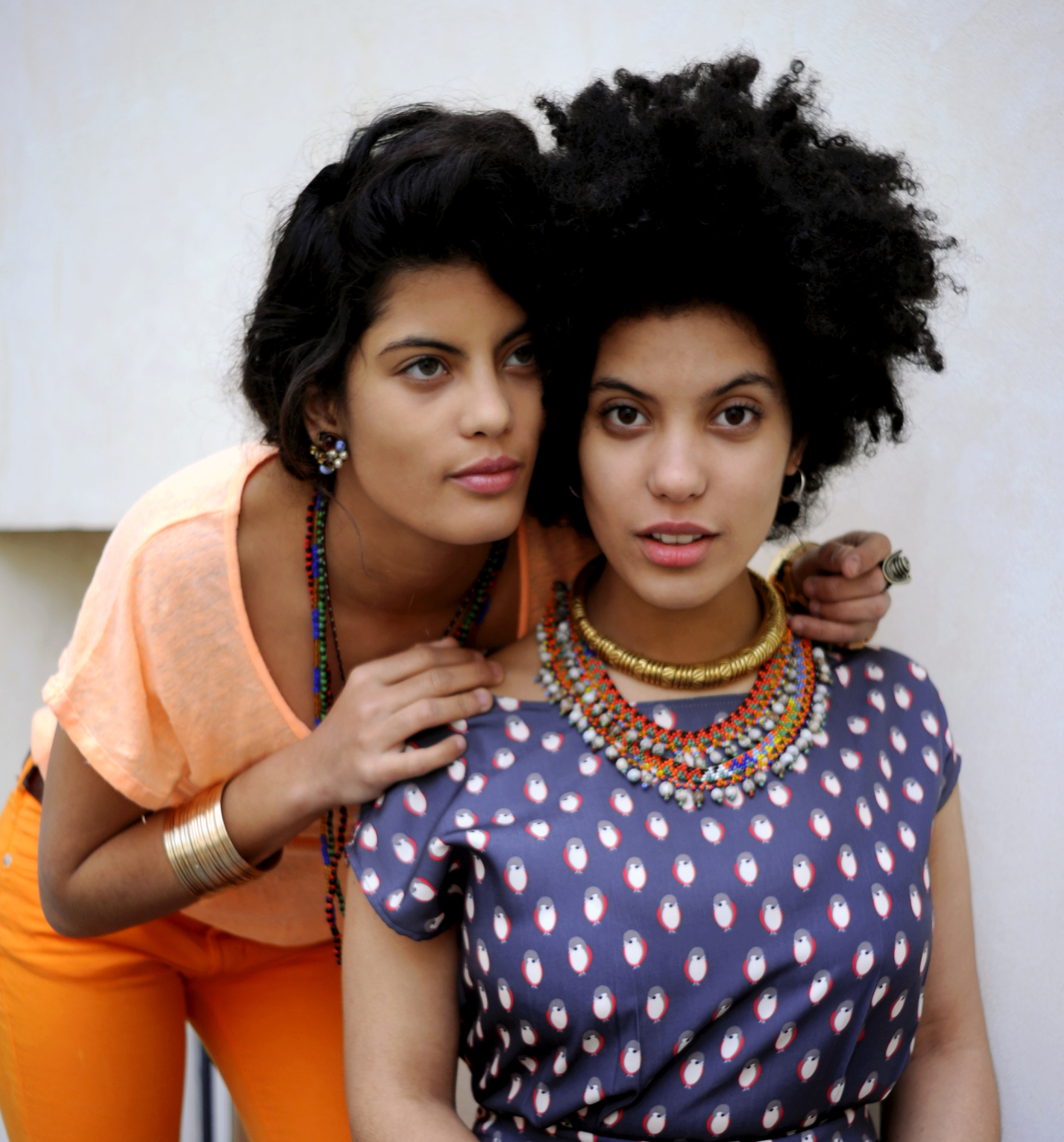
- Naomi (left) and Lisa-Kaindé Diaz

Background information
- Born: 13 December 1994 (age 31); Paris, France
- Genres: Soul; R&B; downtempo; electronic; experimental; trip hop
- Years active: 2013–present
- Label: XL
- Members: Lisa-Kaindé Diaz; Naomi Diaz
- Website: ibeyimusic.com

Ibeyi is a French musical duo consisting of twin sisters Lisa-Kaindé Diaz and Naomi Diaz. The duo sings in English, French, Spanish and Yoruba, In Yoruba, Ibeyi (Ìbejì) means "twins".

Their music has elements of Yoruba, French and Afro-Cuban, and fuses jazz with beats, samples with traditional instruments., Lisa, the lead singer, plays the piano; Naomi plays the traditional Peruvian/Cuban percussion instruments cajón and Batá drum.

== Early life and career ==
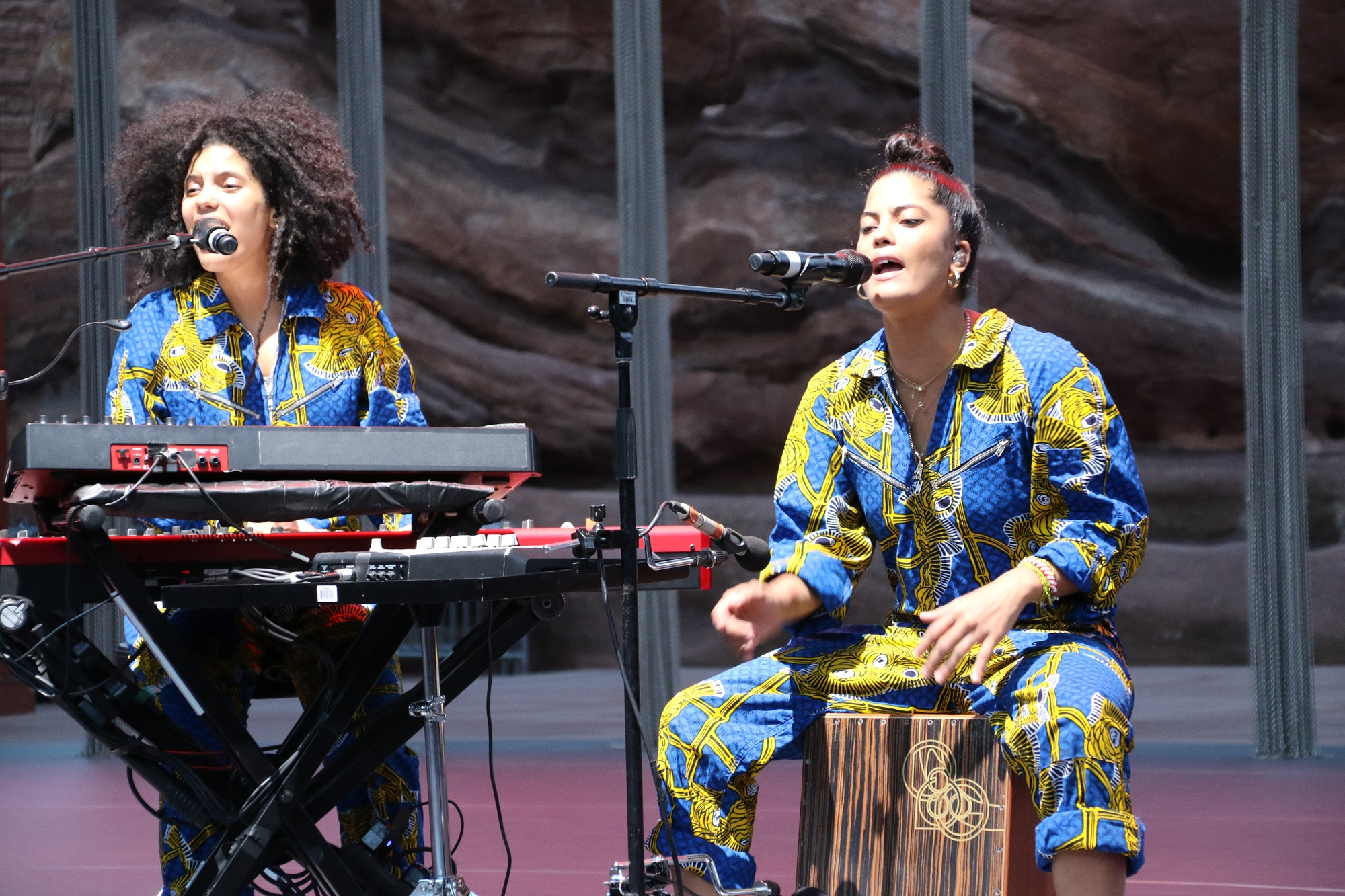
Ibeyi in concert in 2018

The fraternal twins (born 13 December 1994, in Paris) lived in Havana for the first two years of their lives, then moved to Paris, where they were educated. They visited Cuba yearly on holiday, but were primarily raised in Paris, where they currently reside.

Their father was the famed Cuban percussionist Anga Díaz, who has received a Grammy Award for his work with the Latin jazz band Irakere, and was also a member of Buena Vista Social Club ensemble, playing with Ibrahim Ferrer, Rubén González and Máximo Francisco Repilado Muñoz aka Compay Segundo. On his death in 2006, Naomi, then aged 11, learned to play his signature instrument, the cajón. Together the sisters studied Yoruba folk songs. Their mother is French-Venezuelan singer Maya Dagnino, who serves as their manager and encouraged Lisa-Kainde's songwriting.

In 2013, they signed to the record label, XL Recordings. Label owner Richard Russell is the only other contributor to their self-titled debut album, released in 2015. Released when they were 20, the album pays tribute to their deceased father and the track Yanira immortalizes the duo's older sister, who died in 2013. The song ends with a synth that sounds like a life-support monitor.

In 2014, they received attention for the video for their album's second single, "River". The twins appear in a closeup shot throughout, taking turns having their heads forced underwater while the other sings.

In 2016, the twins appeared in the short film for Beyoncé's album Lemonade as members of Beyonce's farm utopia that offers a safe space for black women. In May 2016, Ibeyi returned to Havana for live performances at the CHANEL 2016 Cruise collection in Cuba and the international music festival MUSICABANA.

Their 2017 album Ash was nominated for IMPALA's European Album of the Year Award.

In 2021, Ibeyi released a song for the soundtrack of the film How to Stop a Recurring Dream.

In March 2026, the duo released the single "Aset" as the lead single to their album Offering. The album is scheduled to release on July 26, 2026.

== Influences ==
As well as their father Anga Díaz, the duo claims Frank Ocean, James Blake, and King Krule among their influences.In live shows, they have covered rapper Jay Electronica's Better in Tune with the Infinite and others. Their recordings also show a strong and spiritual connection to their Yoruba roots, as do the name and themes. They also pay tribute to Santería, a syncretism practiced by many Afro-Cubans, and many Cubans in general.

== Discography ==
=== Albums ===
List of studio albums, with selected details
Title	Album details	Peak chart positions									
Title	Album details	FRA	BEL (Fl)	BEL (Wa)	GER	NED	SWI	UK	UK Ind.	US	US Heat.
Ibeyi	Released: 17 February 2015; Label: XL Recordings; Format: CD, DL, LP, streaming	15	28	35	58	52	20	36	9	166	1
Ash	Released: 29 September 2017; Label: XL Recordings; Format: CD, DL, LP, streaming	26	48	73	—	—	47	—	49	—	13
Spell 31	Released: 6 May 2022; Label: XL Recordings; Format: CD, DL, LP, streaming	98	—	—	—	—	—	—	37	—	—
Offering	Released: 26 June 2026; Label: AWAL Recordings; Format: CD, DL, LP, streaming	—	—	—	—	—	—	—	—	—	—
"—" denotes a recording that did not chart or was not released in that territory.

=== EPs ===
Title
Oya EP
Details
- Released: 7 August 2014
- Label: XL Recordings
- Format: DL
Notes

No.	Title	Length
1.	""Oya""
2.	""River""
3.	""Oya"" (Oya Capella)
4.	""River"" (Oshun Dub)

=== Singles ===
List of singles by main artist
Title	Year	Peak chart positions			Album
Title	Year	FRA	BEL (Fl) Tip	BEL (Wa) Tip	Album
"River"	2014	66	84	49	Ibeyi
"Stranger / Lover"	2015	—	15	34	Ibeyi
"Exhibit Diaz"	2015	—	—	—	Non-album single
"Lost in My Mind"	2017	—	—	—	Non-album single
"Away Away"	2017	174	48	—	Ash
"Deathless" (featuring Kamasi Washington)	2017	188	—	—	Ash
"Me Voy" (featuring Mala Rodriguez)	2017	—	—	—	Ash
"Recurring Dream"	2021	—	—	—	Music from the film How to Stop a Recurring Dream
"Made of Gold" (with Pa Salieu)	2021	—	—	—	Spell 31
"Sister 2 Sister"	2022	—	—	—	Spell 31
"Lavender & Red Roses" (with Jorja Smith)	2022	—	—	—	Spell 31
"Aset"	2026	—	—	—	Offering
"Offerings"	2026	—	—	—	Offering
"—" denotes a recording that did not chart
