= Little Grandad =

English rock band

- Origin: London, England
- Genres: Americana; Slacker rock; Indie rock
- Years active: 2025–present
- Label: Communion Music
- Members: Harry Lower; Jack Lower; Ned Ashcroft; James Brennan
- Website: little-grandad.com

Little Grandad are an English rock band. The band consists of brothers Harry and Jack Lower, Ned Ashcroft, and James "Jimmy" Brennan. The band are signed with the record label Communion Music. Their sound has been described as a mix of Americana, slacker rock and indie rock.

== Members ==
- Harry Lower—guitar, lead vocals
- Jack Lower—bass guitar, lead vocals
- Ned Ashcroft—guitar, trumpet, backing vocals
- James Brennan—drums, guitar, backing vocals

== History ==
The four members of Little Grandad "properly met for the first time" at an open mic night at Haggerston Signature Brew. Jack Lower had previously encountered Ashcroft through Mary in the Junkyard, for whom he had worked as a tour manager; Ashcroft shared a flat with the band at the time. After the open mic, Harry Lower developed demos for what became the group's first songs, which he shared with Jack, Ashcroft and Brennan.

Before releasing any music, the band supported Man/Woman/Chainsaw, Cardinals, and The Orchestra (For Now) on tour.

In May 2026, they released their debut singles, "Unmasked" and "Sleepwalking", on the label Communion Music, which were produced by Kev Jones at The Church and The Communion Studios.

In July 2026, they released the single "Babe, We've Run Out of Time".

In September 2026, they released the single "Tiny Feet" and announced their debut album, "Speak Softly, Son".
