= Antlered Man =

UK musical group

2003–2009: Metro Riots; 2009–present: Antlered Man
- Origin: London, UK
- Genres: Alternative rock; indie rock
- Years active: Metro Riots: 2003–2009; Antlered Man: 2009–present
- Labels: Eleven78; New Heavy Sounds
- Members: Damo Ezekiel (vocal); Danny Fury (guitar); Sammy Ray (bass); Oliver Parker (drum)
- Website: www.metroriots.com

Antlered Man is a four-piece alternative rock group from London, England. The band members had previously performed as Metro Riots before changing their band name and style in 2009.

== History ==
=== Metro Riots ===
Metro Riots formed in 2003 and began performing in small venues.

The band released an EP in 2004, titled And So...the Tyrants were Loose. In 2006, their single "When You're Gone", was released under the label Eleven78 Records. "When You're Gone" earned Single of the week in The Sun newspaper and was played on Xfm Radio London 104.9fm on the John Kennedy Show. Metro Riots then toured the UK twice with Dirty Pretty Things, followed by a European tour with Juliette Lewis and the Licks. They returned to England for a solo tour, and recorded an album, Night Time Angel Candy at Rockfields Studios with producer Pedro Ferreira.

Metro Riots' songs "Modern Romance" and "Hazchem Remedy" were featured in the 2006 video game Urban Chaos: Riot Response for Xbox and PlayStation 2. "Thee Small Faces" was featured in the playlist for the video game 'Need For Speed: Carbon' (2006).

In 2007 the band released a single, "New Epidemic" and performed at the SXSW festival in Texas. They followed this with another tour of Europe with Juliette Lewis and the Licks. The second single "Poison the Bride" was accompanied by a music video which was refused play by music video networks. In August 2007, Metro Riots released their debut album Night Time Angel Candy.

=== Antlered Man ===
In 2009 the members of Metro Riots stopped recording and playing under that name, and after recording new demos, relaunched as "Antlered Man", with a heavier, darker and psychedelic-influenced sound.

Antlered Man released an album titled Giftes 1&2 on their own imprint 'Goo Grrrl Records' and subsequently licensed it to Noisolution in GSA. The album gained favourable reviews in Classic Rock, Artrocker, Rock Sound, Drowned In Sound and Germany's Visions magazine. Lead single, "Surrounded By White Men" was playlisted on Xfm and featured feature in Kerrang.

Antlered Man's energetic live performances led to them being nominated for 'Live Band Of The Year' at the 2012 Artrocker awards. They have played a variety of festivals including The Great Escape, Camden Crawl, 2000trees, 1234 Festival, Eire Mit Speck and Krach am Bach.

In 2013 the band released the album This Devil is Them.

In 2014 Antlered Man is signed to London label New Heavy Sounds.
