= Friday Forever (album) =

Studio album by Everything Is Recorded
- Released: 3 April 2020
- Length: 37:18
- Label: XL
- Producer: Richard Russell

Everything Is Recorded chronology
Everything Is Recorded by Richard Russell (2018)	Friday Forever (2020)	Temporary (2025)

Friday Forever is the second studio album by Everything Is Recorded, a project of British record producer Richard Russell. It was released on 3 April 2020 through his record label XL Recordings. It received generally favorable reviews from critics.

== Background ==
Friday Forever is Everything Is Recorded's second studio album, following Everything Is Recorded by Richard Russell (2018). It features guest appearances from Berwyn, Maria Somerville, Aitch, Infinite Coles, Flohio, Ghostface Killah, James Massiah, A. K. Paul, Kean Kavanagh, and Penny Rimbaud. It tells a story that begins at 9:46 PM on a Friday night and ends at 11:59 AM the next day.

== Release ==
Friday Forever was released on 3 April 2020 through XL Recordings, the day after Richard Russell's autobiography Liberation Through Hearing was published through White Rabbit.

Clipz released a remix version of Friday Forever, titled Saturday Specials: The Clipz Remixes, on 29 January 2021.

== Critical reception ==
Professional ratings
Aggregate scores
Source	Rating
Metacritic	75/100
Review scores
Source	Rating
AllMusic	4/5 stars
DIY	3.5/5 stars
Loud and Quiet	4/10
Pitchfork	6.1/10

According to the review aggregator Metacritic, Friday Forever received "generally favorable reviews" based on a weighted average score of 75 out of 100 from 5 critic scores.

Sean Kerwick of DIY described the album as "a solid record with an intriguing concept that unravels fantastically under Russell's loosened leash." Paul Simpson of AllMusic praised Maria Somerville's contributions to the album. He commented that "Her plaintive and enchanting voice appears at the beginning, in the middle, and toward the end, surrounding the graphic lyricism of her duet partners with wraith-like poeticisms." Oskar Jeff of Loud and Quiet stated, "Many passages of the album are perfectly passable, yet it is greatly disappointing considering the level of talent involved here."

The album was nominated for the Best Independent Album award at the 2020 AIM Independent Music Awards.

=== Accolades ===
Year-end lists for Friday Forever
Publication	List	Rank	Ref.
Rough Trade	Albums of the Year 2020	60	

== Track listing ==
Friday Forever track listing
No.	Title	Length
1.	"09:46 PM / Every Friday Thereafter" (featuring Berwyn and Maria Somerville)	1:12
2.	"10:51 PM / The Night" (featuring Berwyn and Maria Somerville)	3:22
3.	"12:12 AM / Patients (Fucking Up a Friday)" (featuring Aitch and Infinite Coles)	2:17
4.	"01:32 AM / Walk Alone" (featuring Berwyn and Infinite Coles)	3:27
5.	"02:56 AM / I Don't Want This Feeling to Stop" (featuring Flohio)	2:36
6.	"03:15 AM / Caviar" (featuring Ghostface Killah and Infinite Coles)	3:58
7.	"04:21 AM / That Sky" (featuring James Massiah and Maria Somerville)	3:58
8.	"05:10 AM / Dream I Never Had" (featuring A. K. Paul)	4:38
9.	"09:35 AM / Pretending Nothing's Wrong" (featuring Kean Kavanagh)	2:51
10.	"10:02 AM / Burnt Toast" (featuring A. K. Paul and Berwyn)	3:14
11.	"11:55 AM / This World" (featuring Infinite Coles and Maria Somerville)	3:59
12.	"11:59 AM / Circles" (featuring Penny Rimbaud)	1:46
Total length:		37:18

== Charts ==
Chart performance for Friday Forever
Chart (2020)	Peak position
UK Official Record Store (OCC)	29
