= Jenny Bruce =

American singer-songwriter

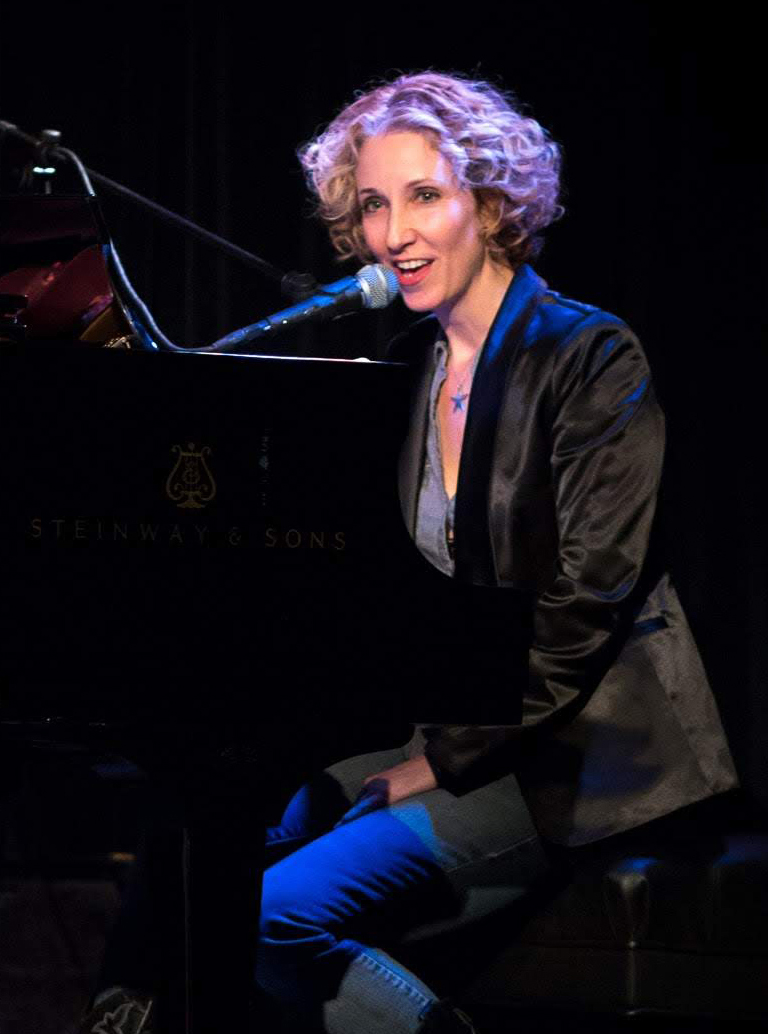
- Bruce in 2015
- Born: November 14, 1966 (age 59); New York City, U.S.
- Other name: Ghoste
- Occupations: Singer; Songwriter; Musician; French Literature Translator
- Years active: 1988–present
- Spouse: Bernard Adnet (m. 1991)
- Children: 2
- Musical career
- Genres: Pop; Rock; Folk; Adult Contemporary
- Instruments: Vocals; Piano; Guitar
- Labels: Atlantic; Mercury; Virgin
- Website: jennybruce.com ghostenyc.com

Jenny Bruce (also known as Ghoste) is an American singer, songwriter, and musician. She has shared the stage with John Oates, Sophie B. Hawkins, Vanessa Carlton, and Avril Lavigne, among others. Her songs have been featured in The Ghost Whisperer, Six Degrees, King of the Hill, Meet My Folks, and Dawson's Creek, among others. In 2001 her song, Amsterdam, won first place for Best Pop Song, in The Billboard Songwriting Contest.

== Early life and education ==
Jenny Bruce was born in New York, New York (November 14, 1966) to parents Duncan and Tamara (née Kahan) Bruce. Her father, Duncan Archibald Bruce, was an author and her mother was a writer.

Bruce taught herself to play the piano at age five when she wrote her first song, and later taught herself to play the guitar in her early twenties. She attended the all-girls Chapin School in New York, New York from grades 1-12. During high school she became the class pianist and also performed in musical theater.

She attended Barnard College in New York, New York and completed her junior year in Paris, as part of Columbia University’s Reid Hall program where she also began working as a jazz singer and waitress at The Hollywood Savoy. She joined the band, SAY which received radio airplay and had a local following. In 1990, Bruce returned to New York and finished her senior year at Barnard College, and holds a bachelor's degree in European History and a minor in French Translation. Bruce is fluent in French and English.

== Music career ==
During her junior year in college in 1987, while studying abroad in Paris, Bruce began performing in nightclubs and restaurants. She joined the French band, SAY which garnered airplay and had a local following. Upon returning to New York, New York, she began performing in clubs and festivals and started writing songs for her first album titled, Jenny Bruce.

=== 1990s ===
Bruce released her debut, self-titled album, Jenny Bruce in 1997. Tracks, "Music to My Ears", was featured in Dawson's Creek.

=== 2000s ===
Bruce created a local following in New York and performed at clubs and festivals as well as opening concerts for Sophie B. Hawkins, Gavin Degraw, and Avril Lavigne, among others. She garnered a following and continued writing songs and released four more albums.

In 2001, she released, Soul on Fire and she was approached by a Los Angeles publishing company to license her songs in film and television which successfully placed many of her songs in major network television shows.

In 2006, Bruce released, Left of July.

=== 2010s ===
Bruce took a break from her music career beginning in 2005 citing,

“It's such a long story.  To sum it up, I didn't write for myself for over a decade.  I Bottled everything up and  locked it up in a jar.  Especially the feelings of loss after my mother died.  That loss broke my heart and hurt so much that I kind of shut down.  Thing is, I became a mother around the same time. It was a very confusing period in my life.  These songs are little life rafts that I wrote to pull myself up and out of a numbing sea"[10][11]

Bruce released, Firefly in a Jar in 2015.

=== 2020s ===
In January, 2020, Bruce released the album, Ghoste.

=== Awards ===
In 2001, Bruce won 1st place for Best Pop Song in the Billboard International Songwriting Contest. She was invited to perform and accept her award at Nashville's Bluebird Cafe where she was awarded an arch top guitar.

Year	Nominee / work	Award	Result
2020	Deep Water	CCVM Best New Song Scholarship	Won
2002	Make It Right	Songwriters Hall of Fame Award	Won
2001	Amsterdam	Billboard Songwriting Contest	Won

=== Songs in film and television ===
Year	Production	Title	Role	Network
2011	Childrens Hospital	Restless Heart	Writer, Performer	Adult Swim
2009	All My Children	Room In My Heart	Writer, Performer	ABC
2009	All My Children	Cross My Heart	Writer, Performer	ABC
2009	All My Children	Home	Writer, Performer	ABC
2008	All My Children	Running	Writer, Performer	ABC
2007	Six Degrees	Cross My Heart	Writer, Performer	ABC
2007	Six Degrees	Saint Cloud	Writer, Performer	ABC
2007	Six Degrees	Alive and Wide Awake	Writer, Performer	ABC
2005	Ghost Whisperer	Home	Writer, Performer	CBS
2003	King of the Hill	Home	Writer, Performer	Fox TV
2003	Meet My Folks	Music To My Ears	Writer, Performer	NBC
2003	Meet My Folks	Amen	Writer, Performer	NBC
2003	Jake 2.0	Anybody Out There	Writer, Performer	UPN
2003	Jake 2.0	Music To My Ears	Writer, Performer	UPN
2002	Glory Days (2002 TV series)	Music To My Ears	Writer, Performer	The WB
2000	Dawson's Creek	Music To My Ears	Writer, Performer	The WB
1999	30 Days (1999 film)	Freddy	Writer, Performer	Film
1999	30 Days (1999 film)	Uptown	Writer, Performer	Film
1995	Sex and the Other Man	Captive Heart	Writer, Performer	Film

== Discography ==
- 1997 - Jenny Bruce
- 2001 - Soul on Fire
- 2006 - Left of July
- 2015 - Firefly in a Jar
- 2020 - Ghoste
