= Richard Russell (music producer) =

British record producer and music executive

- Also known as: Everything Is Recorded; rLr
- Born: 18 March 1971 (age 55); Dollis Hill, London, England
- Genres: Electronic; downtempo; soul; trip hop
- Occupations: Record label executive; record producer
- Instruments: Programming; keyboards
- Label: XL
- Member of: Everything Is Recorded; Kicks Like a Mule; Sam Morton
- Website: XL Recordings

Richard Russell (born 18 March 1971) is an English record producer and the owner of British record label XL Recordings.

== Career ==
XL Recordings was founded in 1989 by Tim Palmer and Nick Halkes to release dance music. Richard Russell joined XL as an A & R scout in 1991.

In 1992, Russell released a single titled "The Bouncer" as part of a duo named Kicks Like a Mule. The Guardian described the song as rave music that was "knocked into shape in about five hours" which "crossed over from pirate radio to reach number seven in the charts." Russell appeared on Top of the Pops and was initially signed to London Records for an album but was dropped from London before its completion.

By 2007, Russell was a chairman and half owner of the record label XL Recordings, which had released albums by groups such as the White Stripes, Dizzee Rascal, Thom Yorke and MIA.

Between 2007 and 2009, Russell worked with the American musician and lyricist Gil Scott-Heron to produce the album I'm New Here, released in 2010. He also conceived the reworking of the original album, We're New Here, remixed by Jamie xx and released in 2011.

In 2011, Russell joined Damon Albarn and several other producers on a trip to Congo where they recorded the album Kinshasa One Two as the newly established DRC Music (Democratic Republic of the Congo Music) group. The album features various producers including Russell, Dan the Automator, Jneiro Jarel, T-E-E-D, Rodaidh McDonald and Kwes alongside various local musicians from Congo. It was released on 7 November 2011 on CD and LP, following a digital release the previous month.

In 2012, Russell and Damon Albarn co-produced The Bravest Man in the Universe, the new studio album from Bobby Womack. In April 2012, Russell became the youngest ever recipient of the prestigious Strat Award, named after music manager Tony Stratton Smith, at the Music Week Awards in London. Russell's label, XL Recordings was named Label of the Year at the ceremony.

In April 2020, Russell released his autobiography Liberation Through Hearing through publishing house White Rabbit.

He has spearheaded the music project Everything Is Recorded. It has released three studio albums: Everything Is Recorded by Richard Russell (2018), Friday Forever (2020), and Temporary (2025). Everything Is Recorded released a song called "Never Felt Better" in 2025, featuring Florence Welch (of the indie rock/pop band Florence and the Machine) and Sampha.

He is also a member of the duo Sam Morton, along with Samantha Morton. The duo's debut studio album, Daffodils & Dirt, was released in 2024.

== Discography ==
=== Studio albums ===
- Everything Is Recorded by Richard Russell (as Everything Is Recorded, 2018)
- Friday Forever (as Everything Is Recorded, 2020)
- Daffodils & Dirt (as Sam Morton, 2024)
- Temporary (as Everything Is Recorded, 2025)

=== EPs ===
- Close but Not Quite EP (as Everything Is Recorded, 2017)

=== Production ===
- Gil Scott-Heron – I'm New Here (2010)
- Gil Scott-Heron & Jamie xx – We're New Here (2011)
- DRC Music – Kinshasa One Two (2011)
- Bobby Womack – The Bravest Man in the Universe (2012)
- Damon Albarn – Everyday Robots (2014)
- Ibeyi – Ibeyi (2015)
- Ibeyi – Ash (2017)
- Ibeyi – Spell 31 (2022)
- Peter Gabriel – I/O (2023)
