= Miguel "Angá" Díaz =

Cuban musician (1961–2006)

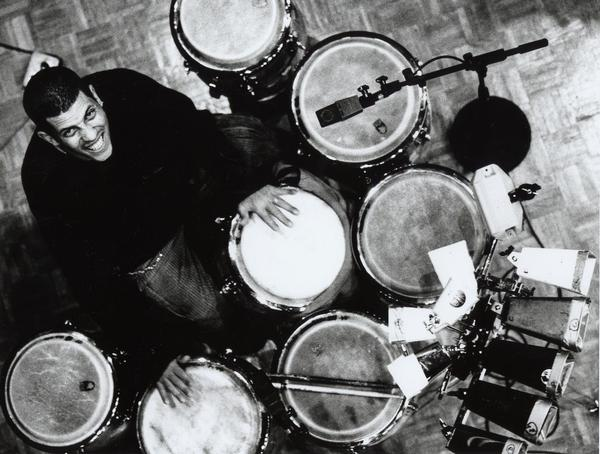

Background information
- Born: Miguel Aurelio Díaz Zayas; June 15, 1961; San Juan y Martínez, Pinar del Río, Cuba
- Died: August 9, 2006 (aged 45) Sant Sadurní d'Anoia, Spain
- Genres: Afro-Cuban jazz, songo, son cubano, Cuban rumba, conga, Santería music
- Occupation: Musician
- Instruments: Conga, cajón, güiro, timbales
- Label: World Circuit
- Formerly of: Irakere

Miguel Aurelio "Angá" Díaz Zayas (June 15, 1961 – August 9, 2006) was a Cuban percussionist. He was a well-known conguero who also played the cajón, güiro and timbales.

== Life and career ==
Miguel Aurelio Díaz Zayas was born in San Juan y Martínez in the Pinar del Río Province in Cuba. Angá is a nickname he shared with his father. He began playing early, performing and recording professionally whilst still at college. In 1987, he made his name as a member of the pioneering Latin jazz Grammy award-winning group Irakere and it was with them he perfected his five drum technique.

He played with various Cuban artists including Afro-Cuban All Stars, Buena Vista Social Club, Omar Sosa, Omara Portuondo and Orishas. He recorded and toured with international musicians such as Steve Coleman, Baba Sissoko, Ry Cooder, Pascal Coulon, Malik Mezzadri, Buddy Montgomery and John Patitucci.

In 1994, he recorded Pasaporte with Tata Güines, winning in 1995 the EGREM Album of the Year award. Two years later Angá joined the American trumpeter Roy Hargrove with whom he released the Grammy-winning Cristol Habana. In 2000 he recorded with Rubén González the Grammy-nominated Chanchullo and in that same year he collaborated with Pascal Coulon on the CD Arpa Fusion.

Angá taught master classes at various schools and universities across North America and Europe. For this purpose he released Anga Mania!, a tuition video which explained many of his techniques and his philosophy behind playing; it won in 2000 the Percussion Video of Drum Magazine.

In 2005, Angá recorded Echu Mingua and in 2006 he embarked on a world tour by the same name. He died unexpectedly of a heart attack at his home in Sant Sadurní d'Anoia, Spain, on August 9, 2006.

== Family ==
Díaz was twice married. His second wife was the French-Venezuelan singer and photographer Maya Dagnino. They had twin daughters Lisa-Kaindé and Naomi, and later separated but remained friends.

On Díaz's death, his daughter Naomi, then aged 11, learned to play the signature instrument of her father, the cajón. Both his daughters studied Yoruba folk songs, and in 2013, aged 19, formed the musical duo, Ibeyi. They signed to the record label XL Recordings and recorded their debut album. Maya Dagnino serves as their manager. Ibeyi pays tribute to both their late father and sister in their music.
