= Pat Pattison =

American educator

Pat Pattison is an American educator who is a professor at Berklee College of Music in Boston, Massachusetts.

== Education ==
Pattison completed his undergraduate degree in Philosophy at the University of Minnesota in 1964, and graduate work in Philosophy at Indiana University Bloomington. He earned a second Master's degree in Literary Criticism at the Kenyon School of Letters in 1968.

== Career ==
Pattison taught Philosophy and Logic at the University of Notre Dame for two years before leaving that position to tour with his band, featherrain.

Pattison began teaching at Berklee College of Music in 1975, first as an English instructor, then as the developer of Berklee's philosophy and poetry electives. He offered a course in literary criticism, and added song lyrics to create the course: Analysis of Song Lyrics. That course aided in the development in Berklee College of Music's songwriting major.

Pattison has published in Home and Studio Recording Magazine and written two books, The Essential Guide to Rhyming, now in a revised second edition in 2014, and The Essential Guide to Lyric Form and Structure. He published his third book, Writing Better Lyrics, in 1995 and an expanded second edition in 2009. Pattison's fourth book, Songwriting without Boundaries: A Lyricist's Guide to Finding Your Voice (2012), is an interactive book of four fourteen-day challenges, and focuses on the creative process through Object Writing and Metaphor.

In 2013 Pattison wrote and began instruction of a Songwriting Massive Open Online Course (MOOC) through Coursera. The course has now had over 700,000 registrants in its several offerings.

He authored a 2015 piece: "Co-Writing: The No-Free Zone" for American Songwriter.
