= Sampha discography =

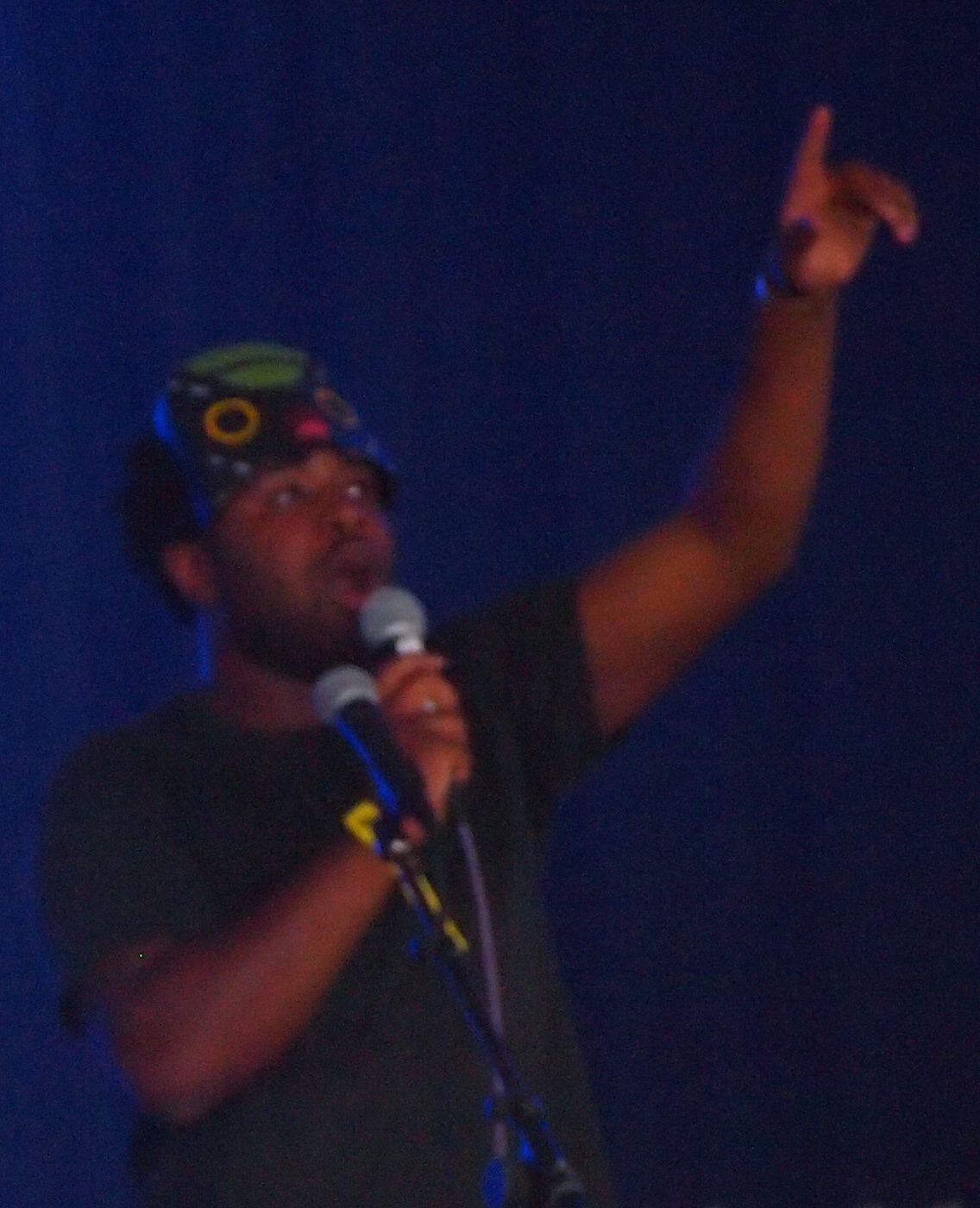
- Studio albums: 2
- EPs: 2
- Singles: 6

English singer, songwriter, musician and record producer Sampha has released two studio albums, two extended plays, and six singles. He joined label Young in 2009 as an intern, which led to his signing. He released his EPs Sundanza and Dual in 2010 and 2013, respectively. He released his debut album Process in 2017 and was met with critical acclaim, eventually winning the 2017 Mercury Prize.

Sampha is also known for his collaborative work with other artists, as a producer, vocalist and musician. He has appeared on recordings by Beyoncé, Drake, Florence + the Machine, Frank Ocean, Ye, Kendrick Lamar, Robyn, Daniel Caesar, Solange, and among many others. He is also known for frequently collaborating with English musician and producer Sbtrkt.

== Albums ==
Title	Details	Peak chart positions										Certifications
Title	Details	UK	UK Indie	AUS	BEL (FL)	CAN	GER	NLD	NZ	SWI	US	Certifications
Process	Released: 3 February 2017; Label: Young Turks; Format: CD, LP, digital download	7	2	28	28	35	46	38	40	34	51	BPI: Silver
Lahai	Released: 20 October 2023; Label: Young	21	4	—	60	—	98	98	40	67	—	

== Extended plays ==
Title	Details	Peak chart positions
Title	Details	UK Indie
Sundanza	Released: 21 June 2010; Label: Young Turks; Format: CD-R	—
Dual	Released: 29 July 2013; Label: Young Turks; Format: CD, 12", digital download	24
Process Remixes	Released: 15 December 2017; Label: Young Turks; Format: 12"	—

== Singles ==
=== As lead artist ===
Title	Year	Peak chart positions			Certifications	Album
Title	Year	UK	UK Indie	FRA	Certifications	Album
"Valentine" (with Jessie Ware)	2011	—	—	—		Non-album singles
"Too Much"	2013	—	7	—		Non-album singles
"Happens"	2013	—	49	—		Non-album singles
"Timmy's Prayer"	2016	—	—	—		Process
"Blood on Me"	2016	—	36	—		Process
"(No One Knows Me) Like the Piano"	2017	92	7	183	BPI: Silver; MC: Gold	Process
"Spirit 2.0"	2023	—	—	—		Lahai
"Only"	2023	—	—	—		Lahai
"Satellite Business 2.0" (with Little Simz)	2024	—	—	—		Lahai (Deluxe)
"I'm on your team" (with Romy)	2024	—	—	—		Non-album singles
"Cumulus / Memory"	2025	—	—	—		Non-album singles
"—" denotes a recording that did not chart or was not released in that territory.

=== As featured artist ===
Title	Year	Peak chart positions								Certifications	Album
Title	Year	US	US R&B/Hip-Hop	US Rap	UK	UK R&B	UK Indie	AUS	NZ	Certifications	Album
"On Your Own" (Lil Silva featuring Sampha)	2011	—	—	—	—	—	—	—	—		The Patience EP
"Hold On" (Sbtrkt featuring Sampha)	2012	—	—	—	—	—	38	—	—		Sbtrkt
"Too Much" (Drake featuring Sampha)	2013	64	23	16	86	14	—	—	—	BPI: Silver; ARIA: Gold; RIAA: Platinum; RMNZ: Gold	Nothing Was the Same
"Temporary View" (Sbtrkt featuring Sampha)	2014	—	—	—	—	—	—	—	—		Wonder Where We Land
"Don't Touch My Hair" (Solange featuring Sampha)	2016	91	38	—	—	—	—	—	—		A Seat at the Table
"Close But Not Quite" (Everything is Recorded featuring Sampha)	2017	—	—	—	—	—	—	—	—		Everything is Recorded by Richard Russell
"Mountains of Gold" (Everything is Recorded featuring Sampha, Ibeyi, Wiki, and Kamasi Washington)	2017	—	—	—	—	—	60	—	—		Everything is Recorded by Richard Russell
"Show Love" (Everything is Recorded featuring Syd and Sampha)	2017	—	—	—	—	—	—	—	—		Everything is Recorded by Richard Russell
"Illusions" (Roses Gabor featuring Sampha)	2018	—	—	—	—	—	—	—	—		Fantasy & Facts
"Soldiers" (Headie One and Fred Again featuring Sampha)	2020	—	—	—	—	—	—	—	—		Gang
"Walking Flames" (Actress featuring Sampha)	2020	—	—	—	—	—	—	—	—		Karma & Desire
"Backwards" (Lil Silva featuring Sampha)	2022	—	—	—	—	—	—	—	—		Yesterday Is Heavy
"What If?" (Lil Silva featuring Skiifall and Sampha)	2022	—	—	—	—	—	—	—	—		Yesterday Is Heavy
"Can We Do This?" (Speakers Corner Quartet featuring Sampha)	2023	—	—	—	—	—	—	—	—		Further Out Than the Edge
"L.F.O." (Sbtrkt featuring Sampha and George Riley)	2023	—	—	—	—	—	—	—	—		The Rat Road
"Open Up" (Kwes featuring Sampha and Tirzah)	2023	—	—	—	—	—	—	—	—		Rye Lane (Original Score)
"Losing You" (Everything Is Recorded featuring Sampha, Laura Groves, Jah Wobble, and Yazz Ahmed)	2024	—	—	—	—	—	—	—	—		Temporary
"Never Felt Better" (Everything Is Recorded featuring Sampha and Florence Welch)	2025	—	—	—	—	—	—	—	—		Temporary
"—" denotes a recording that did not chart or was not released in that territory.

== Other charted and certified songs ==
=== As lead artist ===
Title	Year	Peak chart positions	Album
Title	Year	UK Indie	Album
"Plastic 100°C"	2017	37	Process
"Under"	2017	44	Process

=== As featured artist ===
Title	Year	Peak chart positions						Certifications	Album
Title	Year	UK	US	US R&B/HH	CAN	AUS	NZ	Certifications	Album
"The Motion" (Drake featuring Sampha)	2013	93	61	—	52	—	—	BPI: Silver; ARIA: Gold	Nothing Was the Same and Care Package
"Saint Pablo" (Ye featuring Sampha)	2016	—	—	—	—	—	—	RIAA: Gold; BPI: Silver; RMNZ: Gold	The Life of Pablo
"4422" (Drake featuring Sampha)	2017	50	50	28	27	—	—	BPI: Silver	More Life
"Let It All Work Out" (Lil Wayne featuring Sampha)	2018	—	75	41	—	—	—	BPI: Silver; RMNZ: Gold	Tha Carter V
"Desoleil (Brilliant Corners)" (Loyle Carner featuring Sampha)	2019	—	—	—	—	—	—	BPI: Silver	Not Waving, but Drowning
"Father Time" (Kendrick Lamar featuring Sampha)	2022	39	11	9	10	11	8	BPI: Silver; ARIA: Gold; RMNZ: Gold	Mr. Morale & the Big Steppers
"—" denotes a recording that did not chart or was not released in that territory.

== Guest appearances ==
Title	Year	Other artist(s)	Album
"Neon Blue"	2009	—N/a	251109 EP
"Break Off"	2010	SBTRKT	Break Off EP
"Evening Glow"	2010	SBTRKT	Break Off EP
"Evening Glow (reprise)"	2010	SBTRKT	Break Off EP
"Living Like I Do"	2011	SBTRKT	Non-album single
"Sanctuary"	2011	SBTRKT, Jessie Ware	SBTRKT
"Trials of the Past"	2011	SBTRKT	SBTRKT
"Something Goes Right"	2011	SBTRKT	SBTRKT
"Never Never"	2011	SBTRKT	SBTRKT
"Salient Sarah"	2013	Lil Silva	The Distance EP
"The Motion"	2013	Drake	Nothing Was the Same
"Play"	2014	Katy B	Little Red
"Wonder Where We Land"	2014	SBTRKT	Wonder Where We Land
"If It Happens"	2014	SBTRKT	Wonder Where We Land
"Gon Stay"	2014	SBTRKT	Wonder Where We Land
"Maybe"	2014	SBTRKT, Andrew Ashong	Wonder Where We Land
"Answer	2014	—N/a	Young Turks 2014
"A Kiss Goodbye"	2015	Emile Haynie, Charlotte Gainsbourg, Dev Hynes	We Fall
"Dolphy"	2015	CKtrl	Forest EP
"Saint Pablo"	2016	Ye	The Life of Pablo
"TBD"	2016	SBTRKT	Save Yourself
"Close But Not Quite"	2017	Everything Is Recorded	Close But Not Quite EP and Everything Is Recorded by Richard Russell
"All These Words (A Close But Not Quite Reprise)"	2017	Everything Is Recorded	Close But Not Quite EP
"Mountains of Dub"	2017	Everything Is Recorded, Kamasi Washington	Non-album single
"Everything Is Recorded"	2018	Everything Is Recorded, Owen Pallett	Everything Is Recorded by Richard Russell
"Treasure"	2018	—N/a	Beautiful Boy (Original Motion Picture Soundtrack)
"Desoleil (Brilliant Corners)"	2019	Loyle Carner	Not Waving, but Drowning
"3 Hour Drive"	2020	Alicia Keys	Alicia
"VVY"	2020	Actress	Karma & Desire
"Many Seas, Many Rivers"	2020	Actress	Karma & Desire
"Capo"	2021	Mustafa	When Smoke Rises
"Father Time"	2022	Kendrick Lamar	Mr. Morale & the Big Steppers
"Still"	2022	Lil Silva, Ghetts	Yesterday Was Heavy
"Limitless"	2023	SBTRKT, Leilah	The Rat Road
"LGOYH (Let Go of Your Hurt)"	2023	Kwes, Tirzah	Rye Lane (Original Score)
"Double Standards"	2024	Ghetts	On Purpose, With Purpose
"Memories"	2024	Headie One	The Last One
"Fear less"	2024	Fred again	Ten Days
"Ocean Steppin'"	2025	John Glacier	Like a Ribbon
"Make It Up"	2025	Banks	Off with Her Head
"Blue"	2025	Little Simz	Lotus
"My and Me"	2025	Everything Is Recorded, Laura Groves, Rickey Washington, and Alabaster DePlume	Temporary
"Rain Down"	2025	Daniel Caesar	Son of Spergy
"Tender"	2026	Nia Archives	Emotional Junglist

== Remixes ==
Title	Year	Artist(s)
"Spoiled by Sampha"	2008	Palmstruck
"Basic Space"	2009	The xx
"Sick Tonight"	2010	Dan Le Sac vs Scroobius Pip
"Doorstep"	2010	Othello Wolf
"Sidewalk Safari"	2011	Chairlift
"Minata Waraba"	2018	Oumou Sangare
"Midnight Sun"	2022	Nilüfer Yanya

== Other appearances ==
List of songs co-written, featuring production involvement, instrumentation, vocals, arrangement, engineering, and/or mixing for other artists, showing year released and album name
Title	Year	Lead artist	Album	Credit(s)						
Title	Year	Lead artist	Album	Writing	Production	Instrumentation	Vocals	Arrangement	Engineering	Mixing
"Break Off"	2010	SBTRKT	Break Off EP	Yes	Co		Yes	Yes		
"Evening Glow"	2010	SBTRKT	Break Off EP	Yes	Co		Yes	Yes		
"Evening Glow (reprise)"	2010	SBTRKT	Break Off EP	Yes	Co		Yes	Yes		
"Wonderland"	2010	H.A.S	The Unconscious State EP		Yes					
"Impossible"	2010	H.A.S	The Unconscious State EP		Yes					
"Nervous"	2010	Jessie Ware & SBTRKT	Non-album single				Yes			
"Look At Stars"	2011	SBTRKT	Step In Shadows EP	Yes			Yes			
"Living Like I Do"	2011	SBTRKT	Non-album single	Yes			Yes			
"On Your Own" (feat. Sampha)	2011	Lil Silva	The Patience EP	Yes	Co		Featured			
"Heatwave"	2011	SBTRKT	SBTRKT	Yes	Co		Yes			
"Never Never" (feat. Sampha)	2011	SBTRKT	SBTRKT	Yes	Co		Featured			
"On The Way"	2013	Short Stories	Non-album single	Yes	Co		Yes			
"Let It Go"	2013	Short Stories	Non-album single	Yes	Co		Yes			
"Too Much" (feat. Sampha)	2013	Drake	Nothing Was the Same	Yes		Yes	Featured			
"The Motion" (feat. Sampha)	2013	Drake	Nothing Was the Same	Yes			Featured			
"Mine" (feat. Drake)	2013	Beyoncé	BEYONCÉ				Additional			
"Find U"	2014	Jean Deaux	Non-album single		Yes					
"Play" (feat. Sampha)	2014	Katy B	Little Red	Yes	Yes		Featured			
"Freedom of the Floor"	2014	Nautic	Navy Blue EP			Additional playing				
"Numbers"	2014	FKA twigs	LP1	Yes	Co	Drums, synths, piano				
"For You"	2014	Fabiana Palladino	Non-album single		Co					
"Look Away"	2014	SBTRKT	Wonder Where We Land			Additional programming			Yes	
"Problem (Solved)" (feat. Jessie Ware)	2014	SBTRKT	Wonder Where We Land	Yes		Piano				
"You & I (Forever)"	2014	Jessie Ware	Tough Love				Backing			
"A Kiss Goodbye" (feat. Charlotte Gainsbourg, Sampha & Dev Hynes)	2015	Emile Haynie	We Fall	Yes		Piano	Featured			
"Alabama"	2016	Frank Ocean	Endless				Additional			
"Don't You Wait"	2016	Solange	A Seat at the Table		Co					
"Interlude: Tina Taught Me"	2016	Solange	A Seat at the Table		Co					
"Don't Touch My Hair" (feat. Sampha)	2016	Solange	A Seat at the Table	Yes	Co		Featured			
"Interlude: This Moment"	2016	Solange	A Seat at the Table				Yes			
"Don't Wish Me Well"	2016	Solange	A Seat at the Table		Co					
"Everybody's Coming to My House"	2018	David Byrne	American Utopia			Piano				
"Darth Vader"	2018	Chip	TEN10		Co					Yes
"Grace"	2018	Florence + the Machine	High as Hope	Yes		Piano				
"Let It All Work Out"	2018	Lil Wayne	Tha Carter V	Yes			Sampled			
"Send to Robin Immediately"	2018	Robyn	Honey			Bass synthesizer				
"Softness As A Weapon"	2018	Kindness	Something Like a War			Synth				
"Hard To Believe" (feat. Jazmine Sullivan)	2018	Kindness	Something Like a War	Yes		Synth	Backing			
"Something Like a War" (feat. Bahamadia)	2018	Kindness	Something Like a War				Backing			
"Time (is)"	2019	Solange	When I Get Home	Yes			Additional			
"05:10 AM / Dream I Never Had" (feat. A. K. Paul)	2020	Everything Is Recorded	FRIDAY FOREVER			Synths, piano				
"Soldiers" (feat. Sampha)	2020	Headie One & Fred again..	GANG	Yes		Piano, programming	Featured		Vocal	
"3 Hour Drive" (feat. Sampha)	2020	Alicia Keys	ALICIA	Yes	Co	Keyboards, piano	Featured			
"Amir"	2021	serpentwithfeet	DEACON	Yes	Co					
"Wood Boy"	2021	serpentwithfeet	DEACON	Yes	Co					
"Fellowship"	2021	serpentwithfeet	DEACON	Yes	Co		Additional			
"Stay Alive"	2021	Mustafa	When Smoke Rises				Backing			
"Capo" (feat. Sampha)	2021	Mustafa	When Smoke Rises	Yes		Piano	Featured			
"What About Heaven"	2021	Mustafa	When Smoke Rises			Bongos	Backing			
"Amir (Reprise)"	2021	serpentwithfeet	DEACON's Grove	Yes	Co					
"Fellowship (Remix)" (feat. Ambré and Alex Isley)	2021	serpentwithfeet	DEACON's Grove	Yes	Co		Additional			
"Rich (Interlude)"	2022	Kendrick Lamar	Mr. Morale & the Big Steppers				Additional			
"dvd" (feat. Choker)	2022	Mount Kimbie	MK 3.5: Die Cuts | City Planning	Yes		Piano				
"Fire + Water"	2022	Stormzy	This Is What I Mean				Additional			
"Firebabe"	2022	Stormzy	This Is What I Mean				Additional			
"Sampha's Plea"	2022	Stormzy	This Is What I Mean				Yes			
"Drew a Picasso"	2023	Drake	For All the Dogs	Yes			Sampled			
"My Eyes"	2023	Travis Scott	Utopia	Yes			Yes			
"Memories"	2024	Headie One	The Last One	Yes	Yes	Piano, programming, synthesizer				
"Rain Down"	2025	Daniel Caesar	Son of Spergy	Yes			Yes			
