= Lahai =

Studio album by Sampha
- Released: 20 October 2023
- Genre: Alternative R&B; soul; electronic; jazz; indie; jungle
- Length: 40:53
- Label: Young
- Producer: Ricky Damian; El Guincho; Kwake Bass; Kwes; Teo Halm; Sampha

Sampha chronology
Process (2017)	Lahai (2023)

Singles from Lahai
- 1. "Spirit 2.0" Released: 28 June 2023; 2. "Only" Released: 6 September 2023; 3. "Can't Go Back" Released: 6 December 2023; 4. "Satellite Business 2.0" Released: 16 July 2024

Lahai is the second studio album by English musician Sampha, released on 20 October 2023 through Young, after a six year hiatus. The album is named after Sampha's paternal grandfather. The album features contributions from Yaeji, Léa Sen, Sheila Maurice Grey, Ibeyi, Morgan Simpson, Yussef Dayes, Laura Groves, Kwake Bass, and Little Simz. Lahai was released to widespread critical acclaim. In the United Kingdom, the album debuted at number 21 on the UK Albums chart and number 1 on the UK R&B Albums chart.

== Background ==
On 28 June 2023, Sampha released "Spirit 2.0" as the album's lead single, his first solo track in over six years. On 24 August, he announced the album and its title. He explained the album's title, writing:

Lahai

My grandfather's name

My middle name

My next musical chapter

My next album

Fever Dreams. Continuums. Dancing. Generations. Syncopation. Bridges. Grief. Motherlands. Love. Spirit. Fear. Flesh. Flight.

On 6 September, he released the album's second single, "Only". In September 2023, the Lahai Tour was announced in support of the album, beginning on 29 October 2023 in San Francisco and ending on 7 December 2023 in Paris. In January 2024, Sampha announced an extension of the tour, set to begin on 23 February 2024 in Auckland and end on 26 April 2024 in London.

== Themes and composition ==
Following the critical success of his debut, Process, which explored themes of loss, Lahai marks a shift to a more optimistic space inspired by fatherhood.

Raised in a family with Sierra Leonean roots, Sampha's musical influences range from Todd Edwards to Groove Armada. In describing his creative process, he speaks of drawing out "the general idea [he's] angling at" and "circling back to add color and texture." 2017's Process showcased a global sound palette, blending grime, African folk, jazz, and R&B. In Lahai, Sampha refines this fusion, seamlessly merging live soul music with synthesizers and drum machines. He explains, "I wanted to create a space that felt free, to try stuff out without the expectations of a huge headline show."

The album revolves around Sampha's reflections on human connection as a son who lost his parents and is now a father. Songs such as "Can't Go Back" and "Spirit 2.0" highlight his exploration of orchestral jungle and technical sophistication, while maintaining the gossamer vocals that have made him a sought-after collaborator. He reveals, "The hurt and anxiety shifts a little bit, from being worried about your own point of view to, 'How many years am I going to be around?' I want to help [my daughter] survive through life."

Collaborating with Kwake Bass, Sampha sought to blur the lines between natural and mechanized playing, experimenting with live and electronic drums. The album delves into his broader interests, referencing subjects like Afrofuturism and particle physics. He mentions watching a documentary from which he drew inspiration, saying, "There's this astrophysicist Brian Cox talking about entropy and the reasons why traveling backward in time is much more difficult than how you can travel forward in time."

As Sampha explains in an interview with Vulture, Lahai serves as an encapsulation of his growth from the "tape-hiss symphonies" of 2013's Dual to the "polyrhythmic odysseys" of 2017's Process, highlighting his commitment to personal growth, both physically and intellectually.

== Critical reception ==
Professional ratings
Aggregate scores
Source	Rating
AnyDecentMusic?	8.6/10
Metacritic	87/100
Review scores
Source	Rating
AllMusic	4.5/5 stars
The Arts Desk	5/5 stars
DIY	5/5 stars
The Guardian	4/5 stars
The Line of Best Fit	9/10
Mojo	4/5 stars
MusicOMH	4/5 stars
Paste	8.3/10
Pitchfork	7.0/10
Under the Radar	8/10

Upon release, Lahai received widespread acclaim from music critics. At Metacritic, which assigns a normalised rating out of 100 to mainstream critic reviews, the album received a score of 87 out of 100 based on 12 reviews, indicating "universal acclaim". Aggregator AnyDecentMusic? gave the album an 8.6 out of 10, based on their assessment of the critical consensus. The Guardian's Alexis Petridis named it his album of the week and called it "jittery with anxiety and indecision, yet poised and luscious". Petridis wrote that the fact Sampha made another album instead of sticking to songwriting and "made an album as intriguing and affecting as Lahai – is worth celebrating". Mojo described it as "less introspective and far from lonely, its persuasive positivity carried by a contained riot of euphoric synths, swelling violins, Chic guitars and skittering percussion".

Reviewing the album for The Line of Best Fit, Riley Moquin called Sampha "a generational talent who has once again delivered a rich, emotional work for us to process" and described the album as "phenomenal" as its "remarkable second half pulls together the record as an expressionist painting of life's cyclical nature". Elizabeth Braaten of Paste summarised Lahai as "a transformative album that explores themes like afrofuturism and magical realism across 14 tracks that span a multitude of genres", also finding it to be "as intimate as it is imaginative". Rob Hakimian of Beats Per Minute praised the "dueling forces" in the album's themes, ranging from freedom, time, memory and grief. Ben Jardine of Under the Radar praised the album's thematic inspiration from the novella Jonathan Livingston Seagull, writing that "The tale is an allegory for Sampha's own journey of self-discovery, of the initial limitations the world may place upon us, and how our tireless efforts to push those limitations may earn us criticism and self-doubt, but eventually, belonging, peace, and understanding."

Writing for DIY, Chris Taylor concludes writing "Sampha's voice might be the most instantly recognizable piece of magic in his arsenal, but it's his patience and craft that makes Lahai such a stunning experience." Cameron Cook of Pitchfork found the album to be "thematically dense, but never heavy", calling it "the cleansing shower that comes when it's finally time to wash all the dirt off, shedding layer after layer until all that's left is air".

=== Accolades ===
Publication	Accolade	Rank	Ref.
AllMusic	Best of 2023	—N/a	
Beats Per Minute	Top 50 Albums of 2023	30	
Clash	Albums Of The Year 2023	1	
Complex	The 50 Best Albums Of 2023	47	
Complex UK	Best Albums Of 2023	11	
DJ Mag	Top albums of 2023	—N/a	
Dork	Top 50 Albums of 2023	34	
Double J	The 50 best albums of 2023	8	
God Is in the TV	Albums of the Year for 2023	80	
HuffPost	The Best Albums Of 2023	—N/a	
The Guardian	The 50 best albums of 2023	26	
KCRW	The 23 Best Albums of 2023	12	
The Line of Best Fit	Albums of the year	22	
Mondo Sonoro	Lo mejor de 2023	45	
MusicOMH	Top 50 Albums Of 2023	33	
NPR Music	The 50 Best Albums of 2023	—N/a	
Oor	Eindlijst 2023	18	
PopMatters	The 80 Best Albums of 2023	33	
The Ringer	The 27 Best Albums of 2023	9	
Rolling Stone	The 100 Best Albums of 2023	76	
The Skinny	Albums of 2023	18	
Sputnikmusic	Top 50 Albums of 2023	16	
Under the Radar	Top 100 Albums of 2023	47	
Uproxx	The Best Albums Of 2023	—N/a	
Vulture	The Best Albums of 2023	1	

=== Awards ===
Awards and nominations for Lahai
Ceremony	Category	Result	Ref.
2024 Ivor Novello Awards	Best Album	Nominated	

== Track listing ==
Lahai standard edition track listing
No.	Title	Lyrics	Music	Producer(s)	Length
1.	"Stereo Colour Cloud (Shaman's Dream)"	Sampha Sisay	Sisay; Giles Kwakeulati King-Ashong	Sampha; Kwake Bass^{[a]}; Ricky Damian^{[a]}	2:57
2.	"Spirit 2.0"	Sisay; Kathy Yaeji Lee	Sisay; Yussef Dayes; Pablo Díaz-Reixa; Lee	Sampha; El Guincho^{[c]}; Damian^{[a]}	4:49
3.	"Dancing Circles"	Sisay	Sisay; Díaz-Reixa	Sampha; El Guincho; Damian^{[a]}	3:53
4.	"Suspended"	Sisay	Sisay	Sampha	3:05
5.	"Satellite Business"	Sisay	Sisay	Sampha	1:24
6.	"Jonathan L. Seagull"	Sisay	Sisay; Mansur Brown; Laura Groves; Ben Reed; Morgan Simpson	Sampha; El Guincho^{[a]}	4:34
7.	"Inclination Compass (Tenderness)"	Sisay	Sisay	Sampha; El Guincho^{[a]}; Teo Halm^{[a]}	3:08
8.	"Only"	Sisay	Sisay; Díaz-Reixa	Sampha; El Guincho	2:49
9.	"Time Piece"	Sisay; Lisa-Kaindé Diaz; Naomi Diaz	Sisay; L. Diaz; N. Diaz	Sampha	0:20
10.	"Can't Go Back"	Sisay; L. Diaz; N. Diaz	Sisay; L. Diaz; N. Diaz; King-Ashong; Sheila Maurice-Grey	Sampha; Kwes^{[a]}; El Guincho^{[a]}	3:41
11.	"Evidence"	Sisay	Sisay; Díaz-Reixa	Sampha; El Guincho	3:17
12.	"Wave Therapy"	Sisay	Sisay	Sampha	0:32
13.	"What If You Hypnotise Me?" (featuring Léa Sen)	Sisay; Léa Sen	Sisay; Sen	Sampha	3:38
14.	"Rose Tint"	Sisay	Sisay; Jonathan Geyevu	Sampha; Damian^{[c]}; El Guincho^{[a]}	2:46
Total length:					40:53

Lahai deluxe edition
No.	Title	Lyrics	Music	Producer(s)	Length
15.	"Satellite Business 2.0" (with Little Simz)	Sisay	Sisay; Rosetta Carr; Blake Cascoe; Elsa Hackett; Sean Ruthven Nelson; Simbiata Abiola Abisola Ajikawo	Sampha; Kwake Bass^{[c]}	3:46
16.	"Dancing Circles 2.0"	Sisay	Sisay; Carr; Cascoe; Díaz-Reixa; Hackett	Sampha; Kwake Bass^{[c]}	3:46
17.	"Re-Entry"	Sisay	Sisay	Sampha; El Guincho^{[c]}	5:13
18.	"Sensory Nectar"	Sisay	Sisay; Dayes	Sampha; El Guincho^{[a]}	4:04
Total length:					58:57

Notes

- ^{^[c]} signifies a co-producer.
- ^{^[a]} signifies an additional producer.

== Personnel ==
Musicians

- Sampha – primary artist, vocals, backing vocals, piano, synthesizer, spoken word, Rhodes, gong, drum programming
- Owen Pallett – string arrangements
- Kwake Bass – drums (tracks 1, 4, 10), spoken word (1)
- Sheila Maurice Grey – spoken word (1, 10), trumpet (10, 11)
- Fame's Skopja Studio Orchestra – strings (2, 6, 10, 12, 13, 17)
- Yaeji – vocals (2)
- El Guincho – bass (3, 14), programming (8, 11, 17), bongos (11)
- Ben Reed – bass (3, 7, 11), backing vocals, acoustic guitar, six-string bass, vibraphone (6), electric guitar (11)
- Fabiana Palladino – backing vocals (6, 10, 17)
- Georgia Duncan – backing vocals (6, 10, 17)
- Katie Duncan – backing vocals (6, 10, 17)
- Laura Groves – backing vocals, Rhodes, vibraphone (6)
- Mansur Brown - backing vocals (6), electric guitar (6)
- Teo Halm – bass, drums (7)
- Ibeyi – vocals (9), spoken word (10)
- David Wrench – additional programming (10)
- Léa Sen – vocals (13)
- Ricky Damian – 808 (13)
- Ben Walker – backing vocals (14)
- Jonathan Geyevu – backing vocals (14)
- Pauli the PSM – backing vocals (14)
- Yussef Dayes – drums (2, 18)
- Little Simz – vocals (15)
- Rosetta Carr – bass guitar (15, 16), backing vocals (15, 16)
- Blake Cascoe – drums (15, 16), percussion (15, 16), backing vocals (15, 16)
- ELSAS – backing vocals (15, 16), piano (15, 16), synth (15, 16)
- Ruthven – backing vocals (15, 16), percussion (15, 16), sampler (15, 16)

Technical

- Sampha - production
- El Guincho - production (3, 8, 11), co-production (2, 17), additional production (6, 7, 14, 18)
- Kwake Bass - additional production (1)
- Ricky Damian - additional production (1, 2, 3, 14), engineering
- Teo Halm - additional production (7)
- Kwes - additional production (10)
- Matt Colton – mastering
- David Wrench – mixing
- Ben Baptie – engineering
- Billy Halliday – engineering
- Chloe Beth Smith – engineering
- David Rodriguez – engineering
- Jamie McElvoy – engineering
- Kirkis – engineering
- Andrea Mastroiacovo – engineering assistance
- Ben Loveland – engineering assistance
- Claude Vause – engineering assistance

== Charts ==
Chart performance for Lahai
Chart (2023)	Peak position
Belgian Albums (Ultratop Flanders)	60
Irish Independent Albums (IRMA)	17
Dutch Albums (Album Top 100)	98
French Albums (SNEP)	197
German Albums (Offizielle Top 100)	98
New Zealand Albums (RMNZ)	40
Scottish Albums (OCC)	14
Swiss Albums (Schweizer Hitparade)	67
UK Albums (OCC)	21
UK Independent Albums (OCC)	4
UK R&B Albums (OCC)	1
US Independent Albums (Billboard)	34
US Top R&B Albums (Billboard)	25

== See also ==
- List of UK R&B Albums Chart number ones of 2023
