= Blue Rose (disambiguation) =

Blue rose is a colored flower.

Blue Rose may refer to:

== Art ==
- Blue Rose (art group), a symbolist artist association in Moscow from 1906 to 1908
- The Blue Rose, a psychedelic poster for a Grateful Dead concert in 1979

== Biology ==
- Blue Rose rice, a Louisiana cultivar that was later developed into Calrose rice.

== Literature ==
- The Blue Rose Trilogy by Peter Straub, consisting of the novels Koko, Mystery, and The Throat

== Music ==
- Blue Rose (album), a 1956 album by Rosemary Clooney, accompanied by the Duke Ellington orchestra
- "Blue Rose" (song), a 1994 song by Shizuka Kudō
- Blue Rose (band), an all-female bluegrass music band
- UK folk musician Laura Groves, who formerly recorded as Blue Roses
  - Blue Roses (Blue Roses album), her debut album released in 2009
- Blue Roses (Rachael Sage album), 2014
- Blue Roses (Runaway June album), 2019
- Blue Rose, song by Duke Ellington

== Television ==
- The Blue Rose, a 2012 investigative television drama produced by South Pacific Pictures in New Zealand

== Other uses ==
- Supreme: Blue Rose, a comic book miniseries by Warren Ellis.
- Blue Rose (role-playing game), a role-playing game

== See also ==
- Blue flower (disambiguation)
- "Blue Rose Is", a song by Pam Tillis
