= 2017 Soul Train Music Awards =

Music awards ceremony in Las Vegas, US

Soul Train Music Awards
- Date: November 5, 2017
- Location: Orleans Arena, Las Vegas, Nevada
- Country: United States
- Hosted by: Erykah Badu
- Most awards: Bruno Mars (5)
- Most nominations: Solange (7)
- Website: soultrain.com

Television/radio coverage
- Network: BET, BET Her

The 2017 Soul Train Music Awards took place on November 5, 2017, at the Orleans Arena in Las Vegas, Nevada, and aired on BET Her and BET on November 26, 2017. American singer and songwriter Toni Braxton was honored with the Legend Award for her contributions to the music industry, while the R&B girl group SWV received the Lady of Soul Award.

== Special awards ==
=== Legend Award ===
- Toni Braxton

=== Lady of Soul Award ===
- SWV

== Winners and Nominees ==
Winners are listed first and highlighted in bold.

=== Best New Artist ===
- 6LACK
- H.E.R.
- Kevin Ross
- Khalid
- **SZA**

=== Best R&B/Soul Male Artist ===
- **Bruno Mars**
- Bryson Tiller
- Chris Brown
- Khalid
- The Weeknd

=== Best R&B/Soul Female Artist ===
- Kehlani
- Lalah Hathaway
- Ledisi
- Mary J. Blige
- Solange
- **SZA**

=== Soul Train Certified Award ===
- **Bell Biv Devoe**
- Johnny Gill
- Lalah Hathaway
- **Ledisi**
- Mack Wilds

=== Video of the Year ===
- Beyoncé – "All Night"
- **Bruno Mars – "24K Magic"**
- Chris Brown featuring Usher and Gucci Mane – "Party"
- DJ Khaled featuring Rihanna and Bryson Tiller – "Wild Thoughts"
- Solange – "Cranes in the Sky"

=== Best Gospel/Inspirational Award ===
- Chance the Rapper
- Charlie Wilson
- Kirk Franklin
- **Lecrae**
- Tamela Mann

=== Album/Mixtape of the Year ===
- **Bruno Mars – 24K Magic**
- Mary J. Blige – Strength of a Woman
- Solange – A Seat at the Table
- SZA – Ctrl
- The Weeknd – Starboy

=== Rhythm & Bars Award ===
- **Cardi B – "Bodak Yellow"**
- DJ Khaled featuring Rihanna and Bryson Tiller – "Wild Thoughts"
- French Montana featuring Swae Lee – "Unforgettable"
- Kendrick Lamar – "Humble."
- Yo Gotti featuring Nicki Minaj – "Rake It Up"

=== Song Of The Year ===
- **Bruno Mars – "That's What I Like"**
- Childish Gambino – "Redbone"
- DJ Khaled featuring Rihanna and Bryson Tiller – "Wild Thoughts"
- Khalid – "Location"
- Solange – "Cranes in the Sky"

=== The Ashford & Simpson Songwriter's Award ===
- **"Cranes in the Sky"**
  - Written By: Troy L. John, Solange Knowles, Raphael Saadiq (Solange)
- "Location"
  - Written By: Alfredo Emmanuel Gonzalez, Olatunji Olutomiwa, Samuel David Jimenez, Khalid Robinson, Joshua Scruggs (Khalid)
- "Love Me Now"
  - Written By: Blake Matthew Simon Mills, John Henry Ryan, John Roger Stephens (John Legend)
- "Redbone"
  - Written By: George Clinton, William Earl Collins, Gary Lee Cooer, Donald McKinley Glover II, Ludwig Emil Tomas Göransson (Childish Gambino)
- "Versace on the Floor"
  - Written By: Christopher Steven Brown, James Edward Fauntleroy, Bruno Mars, Philip Martin Lawrence (Bruno Mars)

=== Best Dance Performance ===
- **Bruno Mars – "24K Magic"**
- Chris Brown featuring Usher and Gucci Mane – "Party"
- DJ Khaled featuring Rihanna and Bryson Tiller – "Wild Thoughts"
- Solange featuring Sampha – "Don't Touch My Hair"
- Wizkid featuring Drake – "Come Closer"

=== Best Collaboration ===
- **DJ Khaled featuring Rihanna and Bryson Tiller – "Wild Thoughts"**
- Jazmine Sullivan and Bryson Tiller – "Insecure"
- Mary J. Blige featuring Kanye West – "Love Yourself"
- Solange featuring Sampha – "Don't Touch My Hair"
- SZA featuring Travis Scott – "Love Galore"
