= Radio Red =

Studio album by Laura Groves
- Released: 11 August 2023
- Genre: Pop
- Length: 44:19
- Label: Bella Union
- Producer: Laura Groves

Laura Groves chronology
Blue Roses (2009)	Radio Red (2023)

Radio Red is the second album by British singer-songwriter Laura Groves, and her first under her own name. It was released on 11 August 2023 through Bella Union, and features a sole guest appearance by Sampha. The album received positive reviews from critics.

== Critical reception ==
Professional ratings
Aggregate scores
Source	Rating
Metacritic	84/100
Review scores
Source	Rating
Paste	8.3/10
The Skinny	4/5 stars
Beats Per Minute	77%

Radio Red received a score of 84 out of 100 on review aggregator Metacritic based on four critics' reviews, indicating "universal acclaim". Mojo called it "expansive, restless, subtly volatile, [and] intriguing enough to keep it locked", while Uncut highlighted "the tracks that dispense with the drums and move into woozy, beatless territory, using choral harmonies and FX-laden electric pianos".

Paste's Matt Mitchell described it as "a triumphant display of how wide a creative palette can stretch" and "a pop record through and through", concluding that it is also a "crystalline, shimmering pop enterprise that dares to ask what a project might look like when a synthesizer takes a backseat to a career-defining vocal performance". Joe Goggins of The Skinny wrote that Groves's "cleverly layered vocals do much of the heavy lifting" and that the album "bears all the hallmarks of a carefully constructed labour of love, one rendered all the more elegant by the glacial pace of its gestation".

== Track listing ==
Radio Red track listing
No.	Title	Length
1.	"Sky at Night"	4:31
2.	"Good Intention"	3:42
3.	"Synchronicity"	4:32
4.	"D 4 N" (featuring Sampha)	5:25
5.	"I'm Not Crying"	4:30
6.	"Any Day Now"	4:05
7.	"Time"	4:57
8.	"Sarah"	4:19
9.	"Make a Start"	3:46
10.	"Silver Lining"	4:32
Total length:		44:19

== Charts ==
Chart performance for Radio Red
Chart (2023)	Peak position
UK Album Downloads (OCC)	44
