= Sierra Leoneans in the United Kingdom =

Sierra Leonean diaspora in the UK

Total population
- 17,048 Sierra Leonean born (2001); Ancestral Numbers Unknown

Regions with significant populations
- London, Sheffield, Liverpool, Cardiff, Birmingham, Manchester, Leicester and Bristol

Languages
- Krio, English, Mende, Temne, Mandingo

Religion
- Christianity · Sunni Islam · Atheism

Sierra Leoneans in the United Kingdom are citizens or residents of the United Kingdom who are of Sierra Leonean descent. In 2001, there were 17,048 Sierra Leonean-born residents of the UK.

== Background ==
Sierra Leonean migration to the UK has a long history, with traders, chiefs, doctors and lawyers sending their children to be educated in Britain in increasing numbers from the mid-19th century. In the late 18th century, the settlement of Freetown, Sierra Leone was established by freed African Americans, Afro Caribbeans, and Black Britons who were evacuated to Sierra Leone. The Province of Freedom was founded with the support of the Committee for the Relief of the Black Poor. This settlement lasted from 1787 to 1789 when it was destroyed by indigenous tribesmen. The city of Freetown was founded in 1792 by Black Nova Scotians who were later joined by Jamaican Maroon freedmen in 1900. Today, their descendants are the Sierra Leone Creole people.

== Migration in the 20th century ==
There was a small Sierra Leonean population in the UK in the early part of the 20th century and Sierra Leoneans served in the British Armed Forces during World War II. More recent migration from Sierra Leone to the UK has included refugees fleeing the Sierra Leone Civil War. One author states that some 17,000 Sierra Leonean refugees arrived in the UK between 1992 and 2003. Prior to the war, starting in the 1960s, smaller numbers of refugees arrived in the UK. The Sierra Leonean migrant population includes numerous ethnic groups, including Sierra Leonean-Lebanese. Most Sierra Leonean refugees in the UK live in London, with smaller numbers found in Manchester and other major cities.

== Migration in the 21st century ==
The UK Office of National Statistics recorded 23,000 Sierra Leoneans living in England and Wales in 2011.

== Diaspora organisations in the UK ==
- Krio Descendants Union London

== Notable individuals ==
- Michelle Ackerley – Television presenter
- Alberta – Singer
- Paul Barber – Actor, known for playing Denzil in Only Fools and Horses
- Sylvia Barrie – Contestant on Big Brother 9
- Chris Bart-Williams – Former footballer
- Tiana Benjamin — Actor in EastEnders
- Billy Boston – Former Welsh rugby player
- James Cleverly – Politician
- Carlton Cole – Footballer
- Samuel Coleridge-Taylor – British composer
- John Conteh – Former British boxer
- Curtis Davies – Footballer
- Lamin Deen - Bobsledder
- The Dualers – Busking duo
- Idris Elba – Film actor
- Ryan Giggs – Footballer, holds most appearances for Manchester United
- Michael Harvey – Musician, former member of So Solid Crew
- Albert Jarrett – Footballer
- Len Johnson - Boxer of the 1920s and 1930s
- Steve Kabba – Footballer
- Chris Kamara – Former footballer, currently a broadcaster
- Malvin Kamara – Footballer
- Sheku Kamara – Former footballer
- John Keister – Former footballer
- Amanda Mealing – Actor
- Nigel Reo-Coker – Footballer
- Leroy Rosenior – Former footballer
- Liam Rosenior – Footballer
- Sampha - Singer and songwriter
- Isha Sesay – News anchor on CNN International
- Kadija Sesay – Literary activist, short story writer and poet
- Danny Wilson – Former Welsh rugby player
- Ib Kamara - Fashion journalist and stylist

== See also ==
- Sierra Leone–United Kingdom relations
