= Satellite Business 2.0 =

2024 single by Sampha and Little Simz

Single by Sampha and Little Simz

from the album Lahai (Deluxe)
- Released: 16 July 2024
- Recorded: 2024
- Genre: Electronic; soul; hip hop
- Length: 4:53
- Label: Young
- Songwriters: Sampha Sisay; Rosetta Carr; Blake Cascoe; Elsa Hackett; Sean Ruthven Nelson; Simbiatu Abisola Abiola Ajikawo
- Producers: Sampha; Kwake Bass

Sampha singles chronology
"Can't Go Back" (2023)	"Satellite Business 2.0" (2024)	"I'm on Your Team" (2024)

Little Simz singles chronology
"Gorilla" (2023)	"Satellite Business 2.0" (2024)	"We Pray" (2024)

Music video
- Satellite Business 2.0 on YouTube

"Satellite Business 2.0" is a song by the British musicians Sampha and Little Simz, which was released on 16 July 2024 as the first single from the deluxe edition of Sampha's Lahai album. It is a reworking of the Lahai track "Satellite Business", and was first performed with Little Simz at Sampha's sold-out Alexandra Palace shows in April 2024.

Speaking about the collaboration with Simz, Sampha said "Satellite Business was one of the last tracks to be recorded for Lahai and I'd always imagined a guest verse to expand on it. Simz's music has been close to my heart and ears for sometime now which makes her being on this song that more special. She’s one of my favourite artists."

Little Simz added that she was "so honoured to be a part of this record with Sampha", labeling him "one of the most important voices in music today". She added: "We have great musical chemistry and respect of each other's process. Glad I got to stand alongside him on this."

== Reception ==
The track has been met with positive reviews by music critics such as Pitchfork and Stereogum.

== Commercial performance ==
The single peaked at 6 on the UK's Official Physical Singles Chart on 17 October 2024.

== Music video ==
The music video for "Satellite Business 2.0" was released on 16 July 2024. It was directed by Max Friedman & Caleb Femi and produced by Hannah Partington.

== Track listing ==
12" vinyl and digital download
No.	Title	Length
1.	"Satellite Business 2.0" (featuring Little Simz)	4:53
2.	"Dancing Circles 2.0"	3:46

== Personnel ==
- Sampha – primary artist, vocals, piano, synth, production
- Little Simz – primary artist, vocals
- Rosetta Carr – bass guitar, backing vocals
- Blake Cascoe – drums, percussion, backing vocals
- ELSAS – backing vocals, piano, synth
- Ruthven – backing vocals, percussion, sampler
- Kwake Bass – production
