= Blue flower (disambiguation) =

A blue flower is the symbol of Romanticism.

Blue flower may also refer to:

- Blue flower (Novalis), a poem by the German poet Novalis
- Blue flower (Eminescu), a poem by the Romanian poet Mihai Eminescu
- The Blue Flower, a 1995 novel by Penelope Fitzgerald

== See also ==
- Blue rose (disambiguation)
