= Rain Down (Daniel Caesar and Sampha song) =

Song by Daniel Caesar featuring Sampha

from the album Son of Spergy
- Released: 24 October 2025
- Genre: Gospel
- Length: 3:08
- Label: Republic
- Songwriters: Caesar; Sampha; Billy Ray Schlag; Dylan Wiggins
- Producers: Aver Ray; Wiggins; Tiana Kruškić

Music video
- "Rain Down" (lyrics) on YouTube

"Rain Down" is a song recorded by Canadian singer-songwriter Daniel Caesar featuring English musician Sampha. The song was released on 24 October 2025, via Republic Records, appearing as the opening track to Caesar's fourth studio album, Son of Spergy (2025). The song was written by Caesar, Sampha, Billy Ray Schlag, and Dylan Wiggins. Production was handled by Aver Ray, Wiggins, and Tiana Kruškić.

== Release and promotion ==
"Rain Down" was released as the opener to Son of Spergy. Alongside its release, it was supported by a lyric video.

== Writing and composition ==
"Rain Down" demonstrates the genre of gospel. The song has the sound of rainfall as a background. It has been recorded using piano and a supporting choir. The song's lyrics demonstrate a prayer to the Christian God, opening with the lyrics, "Lord, let your blessings rain down on me". The Daily Targum observed "Rain Down" to have a "hymn-like tone", remaining "calm and relaxed", "ripe with emotional vulnerability", and "layered with harmonies". According to NME, the song differs from the rest of Son of Spergy due to being "more abstract" and lacking rhythmic beats.

The song composed is in the key of A♭, with a speed of 86 beats per minute and a time signature of 4/4. It was written by Caesar, Sampha, Schlag, and Wiggins.

== Recording and production ==
Caesar and Sampha each recorded lead vocals, while Kruškić contributed background vocals. Schlag performed piano and Wiggins performed bass. Schlag and Migui Maloles contributed as recording engineers. "Rain Down" was produced by Ray, Wiggins, and Kruškić. Wiggins programmed, and Heba Kadry and Jordan Evans mastered. Patrick Gardner engineered.

== Critical reception ==
Speaking for Pitchfork, Stephen Kearse appraised the song to be a "gorgeous gospel arrangement", which "feels like a reclamation". Her Campus compared "Rain Down" to the rest of its album, describing the song as "the perfect opener for such an emotional album".

== Commercial performance ==
"Rain Down" was commercially successful upon release. Within its first charting week, the song debuted at No. 15 on the Recorded Music NZ Hot Singles chart. In the United States, the song debuted at No. 24 on the Billboard Bubbling Under Hot 100 Singles chart. On the Hot R&B Songs chart, "Rain Down" hit No. 14, and on the Hot R&B/Hip-Hop Songs chart, it hit No. 38. The song topped the Hot Gospel Songs chart, supported by an entry from the Gospel Streaming Songs chart, which it also led. It marks Caesar's first and only entry into a Christian or gospel music chart.

== Personnel ==
Credits adapted from Tidal Music.

- Ashton Simmonds – writer, vocalist
- Aver Ray – producer
- Billy Ray Schlag – writer, piano, recording engineer
- Dylan Wiggins – producer, writer, bass, programmer
- Heba Kadry – masterer
- Jacob Clements – masterer
- Jordan Evans – mixer
- Migui Maloles – mixer, recording engineer
- Patrick Gardner – engineer
- Sampha Lahai Sisay – writer, vocalist
- Tiana Kruškić – producer, background vocalist

== Charts ==
Chart performance for "Rain Down"
Chart (2025)	Peak position
New Zealand Hot Singles (RMNZ)	15
US Bubbling Under Hot 100 (Billboard)	24
US Hot Gospel Songs (Billboard)	1
US Hot R&B Songs (Billboard)	14
US Hot R&B/Hip-Hop Songs (Billboard)	38
