= Process (Sampha album) =

Studio album by Sampha
- Released: 3 February 2017
- Studios: Miloco the Square (London); RAK (London); Sarm (London); Strongroom (London); Westpoint (London); XL (London); Zelig (London); Ocean Sound (Giske)
- Genres: Electronic; alternative R&B; neo soul
- Length: 40:17
- Label: Young Turks
- Producers: Rodaidh McDonald; Sampha

Sampha chronology
Dual (2013)	Process (2017)	Lahai (2023)

Singles from Process
- 1. "Timmy's Prayer" Released: 17 May 2016; 2. "Blood on Me" Released: 26 August 2016; 3. "(No One Knows Me) Like the Piano" Released: 12 January 2017

Process is the debut studio album by English singer Sampha, released on 3 February 2017 by Young Turks. The album was co-produced by Sampha and Scottish music producer Rodaidh McDonald. It won the Mercury Prize for 2017.

== Recording ==
As compared to Sampha's characteristic bedroom recording style, Process was recorded in professional recording studios. The album was primarily recorded in studios across Sampha's native city of London, although it was also partially recorded at Ocean Sound Recordings on the Norwegian island Giske.

== Release and promotion ==
"Timmy's Prayer" was released on 17 May 2016 as a single. The album's title was revealed alongside the release of "Blood on Me" on 26 August 2016 as Process' lead single. The video for the song was released on 16 September 2016 and was directed by Alex Lill. Sampha performed the song in his network television debut as a solo artist on The Late Show with Stephen Colbert on 1 September 2016. The album's track listing, artwork, and release date were revealed on 3 November 2016 with the announcement of a 2017 tour. "(No One Knows Me) Like the Piano" was released as the album's third single on 12 January 2017. Sampha performed the song on The Tonight Show Starring Jimmy Fallon the following day on 13 January 2017. A video for "(No One Knows Me) Like the Piano" directed by Jamie-James Medina was released on 31 January 2017 in standard format and in virtual reality.

In a cover story with The Fader in June 2016, Sampha premiered "Plastic 100°C" in a solo piano performance on the rooftop of Young Turks' London office.

== Critical reception ==
Professional ratings
Aggregate scores
Source	Rating
AnyDecentMusic?	8.1/10
Metacritic	86/100
Review scores
Source	Rating
AllMusic	4.5/5 stars
The A.V. Club	A−
Entertainment Weekly	B+
The Guardian	4/5 stars
The Independent	4/5 stars
Mojo	4/5 stars
NME	4/5 stars
The Observer	4/5 stars
Pitchfork	8.6/10
Rolling Stone	4/5 stars

Process was met with widespread critical acclaim. At Metacritic, which assigns a normalized rating out of 100 to reviews from mainstream publications, the album received an average score of 86, based on 28 reviews. Aggregator AnyDecentMusic? gave it 8.1 out of 10, based on their assessment of the critical consensus.

Alexis Petridis from The Guardian wrote, "Sisay shows off a genuinely individualistic approach to arrangement. The panic of "Plastic 100°C" floats along on a gentle wave of what sounds like harp or maybe koto. "Kora Sings" features a thrilling patchwork of scampering percussion, electronic noise and field recordings of rain and children speaking. The samples on "Reverse Faults" are melded into an insistent, slightly groggy pulse that's both compelling and unsettling. Nothing feels in thrall to current trends in R&B, either sonically or emotionally: Sisay may have been a constant, quiet presence on other people's records last year, but Process doesn't sound much like any of them. Instead, it's a weighty, powerful album with an identity entirely of its own. And while clearly not constructed with commercial ambition at the forefront of its mind, it's certainly good enough to make an unlikely star of the man behind it".

In NME, Jonny Ensall described the album as a "finely crafted and devastating take on the loss of his mother to cancer, as well as his inner turmoil at how success has dragged him away from his roots". Entertainment Weekly critic Eric Renner Brown said, "Sampha executes a sonically adventurous vision that's entirely his own and builds on his enormous potential". Marcus J. Moore from Pitchfork said that "it's a remarkable, meditative work, as he processes grief and navigates self-discovery". Clayton Purdom from The A.V. Club wrote: "Process is an exercise in finding beauty in even the tragedy of a parent's death, a record of singular probity and hard-earned optimism. It's the best R&B debut since FKA Twigs' LP1." Alexander Smail from The Skinny gave the album a perfect score, stating: "Process is an exercise in catharsis, a deep breath in that lays Sampha's soul bare through gorgeous vignettes of his life. He worries, he regrets, he aches. He's human."

=== Accolades ===
Process won the 2017 Mercury Prize. In 2019, Pitchfork included the single "(No One Knows Me) Like the Piano" on their list of the 200 Best Songs of the 2010s.

Select rankings of Process
Publication	List	Rank	Ref.
BBC Radio 6 Music	Top 10 Albums of 2017	3	
Clash	Top 50 Albums of 2017	3	
Complex UK	Top 15 Albums of 2017	4	
Double J	Top 50 Albums of 2017	4	
Drowned in Sound	Favourite Albums of 2017	90	
Exclaim!	Top 10 Soul and R&B Albums of 2017	2	
NME	NME's Albums of the Year 2017	23	
Pitchfork	The 50 Best Albums of 2017	15	
Pitchfork	The 200 Best Albums of the 2010s	114	
PopMatters	Top 60 Albums of 2017	6	
The Skinny	Top 50 Albums of 2017	5	

== Track listing ==
All tracks are written by Sampha Sisay; track 8 additional writing by Kanye West.

Process track listing
No.	Title	Length
1.	"Plastic 100°C"	5:16
2.	"Blood on Me"	4:06
3.	"Kora Sings"	4:17
4.	"(No One Knows Me) Like the Piano"	3:38
5.	"Take Me Inside"	2:18
6.	"Reverse Faults"	4:13
7.	"Under"	4:41
8.	"Timmy's Prayer"	4:23
9.	"Incomplete Kisses"	3:53
10.	"What Shouldn't I Be?"	3:32
Total length:		40:17

Japanese bonus tracks
No.	Title	Length
11.	"In-Between and Overseas"	3:27
12.	"Answer"	4:27
13.	"Too Much"	3:01
14.	"Happens"	5:07
15.	"Without"	3:47
16.	"Indecision"	4:24
Total length:		64:30

International bonus tracks
No.	Title	Length
11.	"In-Between and Overseas"	3:25
12.	"Answer"	4:24
Total length:		48:13

Sample credits

- "Plastic 100°C" contains samples of Neil Armstrong talking with mission control after taking his first steps on the moon.
- "Under" contains a sample from "I Can Feel Your Love Slipping Away" performed by Samson and Delilah, written by Bruce Nazarian and Jerry Jones.
- "Timmy's Prayer" features samples from the Timmy Thomas recording "The Coldest Days of My Life", written by Eugene Booker Record and Carl H. Davis.

== Personnel ==
Credits adapted from Process album liner notes.

- Sampha Sisay – writing, performing, production
- Rodaidh McDonald – production
- David Wrench – mixer
- Matt Colton – mastering
- Riccardo Damian – engineer
- John Foyle – additional vocal engineer (track 2)
- Josh Doughty – kora (track 3)
- Laura Groves – backing vocals (track 3)
- Pauli "The PSM" Stanley-McKenzie – drums and percussion (track 3)
- Ben Walker – artwork and photography (cover)
- Kanye West – writing (track 8)

== Charts ==
Chart performance for Process
Chart (2017)	Peak position
Australian Albums (ARIA)	28
Belgian Albums (Ultratop Flanders)	28
Belgian Albums (Ultratop Wallonia)	144
Canadian Albums (Billboard)	35
Dutch Albums (Album Top 100)	38
French Albums (SNEP)	117
German Albums (Offizielle Top 100)	46
Irish Albums (IRMA)	98
Japanese Albums (Oricon)	155
New Zealand Albums (RMNZ)	40
Portuguese Albums (AFP)	44
Scottish Albums (Official Charts)	34
Swiss Albums (Schweizer Hitparade)	34
UK Albums (Official Charts)	7
UK Independent Albums (Official Charts)	3
US Billboard 200	51
US Top R&B/Hip-Hop Albums (Billboard)	21

== Certifications ==
Certifications for Process
Region	Certification	Certified units/sales
United Kingdom (BPI)	Silver	60,000^{‡}
^{‡} Sales+streaming figures based on certification alone.
