= Son of Spergy =

Studio album by Daniel Caesar
- Released: October 24, 2025
- Recorded: 2021–2025
- Studio: Rue Boyer (Paris); Westlake (Los Angeles); Black Rock (Santorini); Electric Lady (New York); Caesar's Palace (New York); GoldenEye (Ocho Rios); Arnwood Ranch (Los Angeles); Phase One (Toronto); Sleeper Sounds (London); HardPink (Los Angeles); Real World (Bath); Chalice (Los Angeles)
- Genre: R&B
- Length: 51:44
- Label: Republic
- Producer: Matthew Burnett; Daniel Caesar; Rami Dawod; Jordan Evans; Teo Halm; Romil Hemnani; Simon Hessman; Tiana Kruškić; Sean Leon; Aver Ray; Rex Orange County; Zachary Simmonds; Dylan Wiggins

Daniel Caesar chronology
Never Enough (2023)	Son of Spergy (2025)

Singles from Son of Spergy
- 1. "Have a Baby (With Me)" Released: July 25, 2025; 2. "Call on Me" Released: August 22, 2025; 3. "Moon" Released: September 23, 2025; 4. "Who Knows" Released: February 6, 2026

Son of Spergy is the fourth studio album by Canadian singer-songwriter Daniel Caesar. It was released through Republic Records on October 24, 2025. Caesar's reconciliation with his parents inspired the album; "Spergy" is his father's nickname. The album's themes include masculinity, faith, and the sense of self-importance. At the Juno Awards of 2026, the album was nominated for Contemporary R&B/Soul Recording of the Year.

The album charted in several international charts, debuting on the top ten of the Billboard Canadian Albums and US Billboard 200, becoming his highest debut on the latter. The album also topped the US Top R&B/Hip-Hop Albums. Four singles supported the album: "Have a Baby (With Me)", "Call on Me", "Moon" featuring Bon Iver, and "Who Knows".

== Composition ==
The album was executively produced by frequent collaborator Jordan Evans and Mustafa. Production credits on the album includes Caesar himself, Evans, Matthew Burnett, Rami Dawod, Simon Hessman, Dylan Wiggins, Aver Ray, Tiana Kruškić, Rex Orange County, Teo Halm, Romil Hemnani, Sean Leon, and Zachary Simmonds. The album also features collaborations with Sampha, Bon Iver, Yebba, Blood Orange, his brother 646yf4t (Zachary Simmonds), and his own father Norwill Simmonds, who is a gospel singer.

== Critical reception ==
Professional ratings
Aggregate scores
Source	Rating
Metacritic	61/100
Review scores
Source	Rating
AllMusic	3/5 stars
Clash	7/10
NME	3/5 stars
Pitchfork	5.6/10

On Metacritic, which assigns a normalized rating out of 100 to reviews from professional publications, the album received an average score of 61 based on four reviews, indicating "generally favorable reviews". Andy Kellman of AllMusic described the songs as "spare and finely textured with the exception of 'Call on Me,' a sauntering, slightly ragged rocker offering assurance." Kellman added, "The surplus of ambling ballads, especially during a stretch in the latter half that features the soft voices of Justin Vernon, Yebba, and Hynes, blurs the line between pleasantly languid and laborious. Near the end, there's a slight uptick in intensity." He believed the final track, "Sins of the Father", was "a startling way to finish an album that contains signs of father-son reconciliation. Instead of tying it with a bow, Caesar flings it to the ground." Fred Garratt-Stanley of NME wrote "Sometimes the introspection is a touch overcooked, the lyricism stumbling into platitude. But the honesty and self-interrogation should be applauded, and the powerful, richly textured soundscapes behind it all show why Daniel Caesar is revered as one of the most important artists in modern R&B and soul."

Some music critics offered more critical perspectives. Stephen Kearse of Pitchfork opined that the music following the opening track "Rain Down" was "directionless", stating "Caesar sings often of wanting to become a father, but the theme is muddled by his clumsy writing." He commented that Caesar had "more platitudes than testimonies" and called the songwriting "sophomoric", adding that he "shows no interest in the melodrama that can elevate R&B songs about love and its complications into the sublime, the singular. Whatever story he aims to tell about faith, it's not in the music." Irene Monokandilos of Clash wrote "Yet for all its thematic daring, 'Son of Spergy' ultimately falters into inertia. This is diet Daniel Caesar at best. The production is a circling of the rhythmic drain – settling too often into a homogenous mid-tempo blur that once felt meditative but now risks monotony. Lyrics feel more like the stream-of-consciousness journaling my therapists orders me to do each morning, rather than the timeless, poetic ingenuity we've come to expect. Caesar wants 'Son of Spergy' to sound like the Montana sky where much of it was conceived: endless, open, warm, quietly divine. But wide-open landscapes can feel empty and tedious when you don't fill them with movement. Still, there's power in imperfection. 'Son of Spergy' won't restore Caesar's sonic crown, nor does it try to. He's an artist mid-molt, shedding the reflexive need to please, learning how to sit with the awkward silences. The result isn't always beautiful, but it's rarely dishonest."

== Commercial performance ==
In Canada, Son of Spergy debuted at number eight on the Billboard Canadian Albums, becoming Caesar's third consecutive top ten album on the chart. In the United States, the album became Caesar's first top ten debut on the Billboard 200, placing at four with 43,000 equivalent album units. The album also debuted at number one on the US Top R&B/Hip-Hop Albums, becoming his first to do so.

== Track listing ==
Son of Spergy track listing
No.	Title	Writer(s)	Producer(s)	Length
1.	"Rain Down" (featuring Sampha)	Ashton Simmonds; Sampha Lahai Sisay; Billy Ray Schlag; Dylan Wiggins	Aver Ray; Wiggins; Tiana Kruškić	3:07
2.	"Have a Baby (With Me)"	A. Simmonds; Mustafa Ahmed; Jordan Evans; Teo Halm	Simon Hessman; Evans; Halm; Wiggins; Ray^{[a]}	3:45
3.	"Call on Me"	A. Simmonds; Matthew Burnett; Evans; Isaac Stalling; Rami Dawod	Evans; Burnett; Daniel Caesar; Dawod	2:49
4.	"Baby Blue" (featuring Norwill Simmonds)	A. Simmonds; Norwill Simmonds; Wiggins; Schlag; Hessman; Richard Uglow; Devonté Hynes	Wiggins; Caesar; Ray^{[a]}; Dev Hynes^{[a]}; Hessman^{[a]}; Uglow^{[a]}; Evans^{[a]}; Burnett^{[a]}	5:57
5.	"Root of All Evil"	A. Simmonds; Schlag; Claire Cottrill; Ahmed; Wiggins; Hessman	Wiggins; Caesar; Hessman^{[a]}; Ray^{[a]}	4:25
6.	"Who Knows"	A. Simmonds; Burnett; Wiggins; Alex O'Connor; Romil Hemnani; Ahmed; Justin Vernon	Caesar; Burnett; Rex Orange County^{[a]}; Hemnani^{[a]}	3:50
7.	"Moon" (featuring Bon Iver)	A. Simmonds; Burnett; Stalling; Hessman; Wiggins; Vernon; Dawod	Caesar; Hessman; Dawod; Wiggins; Burnett^{[a]}; Hemnani^{[a]}; Vernon^{[a]}	5:17
8.	"Touching God" (featuring Yebba and Blood Orange)	A. Simmonds; Ahmed; Abigail Smith; Hynes; O'Connor; Wiggins; Kruškić; Schlag; Hemnani	Caesar; Rex Orange County; Ray; Hemnani; Wiggins; Kruškić; Hynes^{[a]}	4:41
9.	"Sign of the Times"	A. Simmonds; Schlag; Wiggins; Burnett; Dawod; Hemnani	Caesar; Hemnani; Dawod; Wiggins; Burnett^{[a]}; Ray^{[a]}	3:51
10.	"Emily's Song"	A. Simmonds; Matthew Sean Leon; Wiggins; Axel Benamar	Caesar; Wiggins; Sean Leon; Benamar^{[a]}	2:54
11.	"No More Loving (On Women I Don't Love)" (featuring 646yf4t)	A. Simmonds; Zachary Simmonds; Wiggins	Zachary Simmonds; Wiggins	3:18
12.	"Sins of the Father" (featuring Bon Iver)	A. Simmonds; Schlag; Vernon	Caesar; Kruškić; Ray; Burnett^{[a]}; Evans^{[a]}	7:50
Total length:				51:44

=== Note and sample credits ===
- ^{^[a]} indicates an additional producer
- "Have a Baby (With Me)" contains samples of:
  - "Sometimes I Cry", written and performed by Les McCann
  - "Woman I Need You", written by Bradley Brown, Dave Richards, Bobby Dixon, Dalton Brown, Paul A. Heaton, and Miguel Orlanda Collins, and performed by Sizzla
- "Call on Me" contains samples of:
  - "You're Getting a Little Too Smart", written by Abrim Tilmon and performed by Detroit Emeralds
  - "Cherry Oh Baby" written and performed by Eric Donaldson

== Personnel ==
Credits adapted from the album's liner notes.

=== Musicians ===
- Daniel Caesar – vocals (all tracks), bass (tracks 2–10, 12), background vocals (2, 4, 8), guitar (3–6, 8–10, 12), synthesizers (3, 5–8, 12), piano (8, 12)
- Dylan Wiggins – programming (1, 4, 5, 10, 11), bass (1, 5, 11), keyboards (2, 5, 10), synthesizers (2, 7, 8, 10, 11), drums (5, 9); background vocals, percussion (5)
- Tiana Kruškić – background vocals (1, 2, 4, 5, 8, 12)
- Billy Ray Schlag – piano (1, 8, 12), background vocals (2, 4, 5, 12), programming (2, 4, 5), percussion (2), string composition (4, 9); guitar, sitar (5, 8, 12); bass, glockenspiel (8, 12); drums, synthesizers, keyboards (12)
- Sampha – vocals (1)
- Jordan Evans – programming (2–4, 12), drums (2, 3)
- Simon Hessman – guitar (2, 4, 5, 7), programming (2, 4, 5), percussion (2, 4), synthesizers (2)
- Matthew Burnett – piano, organ (3); percussion (4), drums (6, 7, 9); bass, keyboards, synthesizers (6); programming, horn composition (9)
- Isaac Stalling – lap steel (3, 7)
- Rami Dawod – programming (3, 7), synthesizers (3); piano, tambourine, percussion, vibraphone (7)
- Antoine Silverman – violin (4, 5, 9)
- Emily Yarbrough – violin (4, 5, 9)
- Lady Jess – violin (4, 5, 9)
- Jonathan Dinklage – viola (4, 5, 9)
- Yuka Kaito – viola (4, 5, 9)
- Peter Sachon – cello (4, 5, 9)
- Dev Hynes – bass (4, 8); drums, programming (4); vocals (8)
- Norwill Simmonds – vocals (4)
- Clairo – background vocals (5)
- Alex O'Connor – synthesizers (6), guitar (8)
- Romil Hemnani – programming, synthesizers (6); guitar (9)
- Justin Vernon – background vocals, guitar; vocals (12)
- Yebba – vocals (8)
- Brandon Volel – trumpet, flugelhorn (9)
- Nasir Dickerson – sousaphone (9)
- Axel Benamar – guitar, piano (10)
- Zachary Simmonds – vocals, background vocals, synthesizers, bass, drums, programming (11)
- Olivia Walker – choir vocals (12)
- Alana Linsey – choir vocals (12)
- Alayna Rodgers – choir vocals (12)
- Cameron Wright – choir vocals (12)
- Charles Henderson – choir vocals (12)

=== Technical and visuals ===
- Migui Maloles – engineering, mixing
- Billy Ray Schlag – engineering (1, 8)
- Eric Fuller – engineering (3)
- Romil Hemnani – engineering (9)
- John Muller – engineering (11), engineering assistance (3)
- Josh Sellers – engineering (12)
- Patrick Gardner – engineering assistance (1, 8)
- Kostas Kalimeris – engineering assistance (2, 4, 5)
- Michael Deano – engineering assistance (4–11)
- Dani Perez – engineering assistance (4)
- Bob Mackenzie – engineering assistance (5, 10)
- Philemon "Sammy Sosa" Joseph – engineering assistance (7, 12)
- Don "Hulio" Outten – engineering assistance (8)
- Rémy Dumelz – engineering assistance (9)
- Austin Christy – engineering assistance (12)
- Jordan Evans – mixing (1–9, 11, 12), executive production
- Heba Kadry – mastering
- Jacob Clements – mastering assistance
- Daniel Caesar – executive production
- Matthew Burnett – executive production
- Mustafa Ahmed – executive production
- Trent Munson – creative direction
- Eddie Mandell – design
- Chase Shewbridge – design
- Nicholas D'Apolito – design

== Charts ==
Chart performance for Son of Spergy
Chart (2025)	Peak position
Australian Albums (ARIA)	16
Belgian Albums (Ultratop Flanders)	47
Belgian Albums (Ultratop Wallonia)	188
Canadian Albums (Billboard)	8
Dutch Albums (Album Top 100)	25
French Albums (SNEP)	188
Japanese Dance & Soul Albums (Oricon)	12
New Zealand Albums (RMNZ)	8
Nigerian Albums (TurnTable)	96
Portuguese Albums (AFP)	11
Scottish Albums (OCC)	72
Swiss Albums (Schweizer Hitparade)	44
UK Albums (OCC)	44
UK R&B Albums (OCC)	5
US Billboard 200	4
US Top R&B/Hip-Hop Albums (Billboard)	1
