= Sbtrkt (album) =

Studio album by Sbtrkt
- Released: 27 June 2011
- Genre: Electronic; future garage; dubstep; breakbeat; soul; UK garage
- Length: 40:28
- Label: Young Turks
- Producer: Sbtrkt; Sampha

Sbtrkt chronology
Sbtrkt (2011)	Wonder Where We Land (2014)

Singles from SBTRKT
- 1. "Living Like I Do" Released: 11 April 2011; 2. "Wildfire" Released: 23 May 2011; 3. "Pharaohs" Released: 5 September 2011; 4. "Hold On" Released: 19 March 2012

Sbtrkt (stylised as SBTRKT) is the debut studio album by English musician Sbtrkt. Pitchfork placed the album at number 42 on its list of the "Top 50 albums of 2011".

== Reception ==
Professional ratings
Aggregate scores
Source	Rating
AnyDecentMusic?	7.7/10
Metacritic	76/100
Review scores
Source	Rating
AllMusic	4/5 stars
The A.V. Club	B
The Guardian	3/5 stars
The Irish Times	5/5 stars
NME	6/10
Pitchfork	8.1/10
Q	4/5 stars
Rolling Stone	3.5/5 stars
Spin	8/10
XLR8R	8.5/10

At Metacritic, Sbtrkt holds an average score of 76 out of 100, based on 21 reviews, which indicates "generally favorable reviews". It won DJ Magazine album of the year and came #49 in the NME albums of 2011.

== Singles ==
- "Living Like I Do" ft. Sampha was the first single which was released on 11 April 2011 on vinyl and as a download. The B-side being a Machinedrum remix of "Look at Stars".

The instrumental version was released previously, entitled 'Colonise' from the Step In Shadows - EP.

- "Wildfire" ft. Little Dragon was the second single which was released on 23 May 2011. The remix of Wildfire featuring Drake was released for this single's B-side.
- "Pharaohs" ft. Roses Gabor was the third single which was released on 5 September 2011. The official video was released on 7 September 2011.
- "Hold On" ft. Sampha was the fourth single which was released on 19 March 2012. The official video was released on 21 March 2012. Hold On includes "Ride to Freedom" as a B-side.

== Track listing ==
No.	Title	Writer(s)	Producer(s)	Length
1.	"Heatwave"	Aaron Jerome; Sampha Sisay	Jerome; Sisay	2:54
2.	"Hold On" (featuring Sampha)	Jerome; Sisay; Tic	Jerome	3:27
3.	"Wildfire" (featuring Little Dragon)	Jerome; Yukimi Nagano; Erik Bodin; Fredrik Källgren Wallin; Arild Werling	Jerome	3:21
4.	"Sanctuary" (featuring Sampha and Jessie Ware)	Jerome	Jerome	3:52
5.	"Trials of the Past" (featuring Sampha)	Jerome; Sisay	Jerome	4:24
6.	"Right Thing to Do" (featuring Jessie Ware)	Jerome; Jessie Ware; Sisay	Jerome	3:23
7.	"Something Goes Right" (featuring Sampha)	Jerome; Sisay	Jerome	5:00
8.	"Pharaohs" (featuring Roses Gabor)	Jerome; Roses Gabor	Jerome	3:38
9.	"Ready Set Loop"	Jerome	Jerome	3:06
10.	"Never Never" (featuring Sampha)	Jerome; Sisay	Jerome; Sisay	3:57
11.	"Go Bang"	Jerome	Jerome	3:32
Total length:				40:28

iTunes bonus tracks
No.	Title	Writer(s)	Producer(s)	Length
12.	"Living Like I Do" (featuring Sampha)	Jerome; Sisay	Jerome	2:53
13.	"Look at Stars" (featuring Sampha)	Jerome; Sisay	Jerome	4:01
Total length:				47:22

== Charts ==
Chart (2011)	Peak position
Belgian Albums (Ultratop Flanders)	182
Belgian Alternative Albums (Ultratop Flanders)	15
Belgian Heatseekers (Ultratop Flanders)	1
UK Albums (OCC)	93
UK Album Downloads (OCC)	56
UK Dance Albums (OCC)	8
UK Independent Albums (OCC)	8

== Certifications ==
Region	Certification	Certified units/sales
United Kingdom (BPI)	Silver	60,000^{*}
^{*} Sales figures based on certification alone.
