= Nikki Nelms =

American hairdresser

- Occupation: Hairdresser
- Years active: 2004–present
- Known for: "Don't Touch My Hair" (hairstyling)

Nikki Nelms is an American hairdresser. She has worked with celebrities including Solange, Janelle Monáe, Zoë Kravitz, and Yara Shahidi. Her best known work includes the hair styling in Solange's "Don't Touch My Hair" and Janelle Monáe's hair in "Pynk". Nelms is known for using non-traditional materials and bold silhouettes in her styling.

== Career ==
Nelms was raised in St. Petersburg, Florida. She self-taught hairstyling as a teenager and honed her skills by doing hair for her classmates and her eight aunts. She attended a few years of college at Florida State University before leaving to pursue a career in hairstyling, and later attended beauty school. Nelms broke into styling for celebrities in 2004 after she met Lil Wayne at Club 360 in New Orleans. This led to later collaborations and helped her gain footing in the entertainment industry. Some of her earliest work was hair styling on music videos for artists such as Kanye West and Timbaland.

Doreen St. Félix of Vogue described Nelms' approach to hairstyling as "mixing avant-garde ideas with more traditional techniques." Nelms is known for including everyday objects as accessories in her styles, like sticking several combs on a high vertical ponytail. She also uses non-traditional materials like wire to create structural, sculpted looks. Nelms buys many of her accessories from Home Depot, as well as craft stores, thrift shops, and beauty supply stores.

Nelms uses the term "collaborate" to discuss how she works with clients and how she decides on styling. She has discussed the versatility of Black hair and how styling natural Black hair is sometimes interpreted as radical regardless of her intentions.

== Clients ==
Nelms' clients include La La Anthony, Beyoncé, Serena Williams, Bianca Lawson, and Jurnee Smollett. She is Zoë Kravitz's key hairstylist. She styled Yara Shahidi's hair for the 2019 CFDA Awards in a braided chignon inspired by a look worn by Diana Ross in the 1975 film Mahogany.

Nelms has been styling Solange Knowles' hair since as early as 2006 after they were introduced by a mutual friend. The first look she executed for Solange included bangs inspired by singer Shareefa Faradah Cooper, to cover a case of pinkeye Solange was dealing with. In 2014, Nelms styled Solange's bridal hair for her wedding day with baby's breath in her afro. She did extensive styling for Solange's A Seat At the Table (2016) album, including every look for the "Don't Touch My Hair" video. The beaded braids Solange wore in the video went viral, with fans replicating the braids across social media. The look was inspired by jazz singer Patrice Rushen.

Nelms collaborates frequently with Janelle Monáe, and first worked with her at the 2016 Toronto International Film Festival. She styled Monáe's hair at the 2019 Met Gala and the 2020 Academy Awards. She also styled Monáe's hair for the music video "Pynk" in a look with bright pink pompoms attached to a top bun.

== Personal life ==
Nelms resides in Brooklyn, New York City.

== Accolades ==
- 2020 – Make-Up Artists and Hair Stylists Guild Award for Best Contemporary Hair Styling in a Feature-Length Motion Picture (for Birds of Prey)
