= Saint Pablo =

2016 song by Kanye West and Sampha

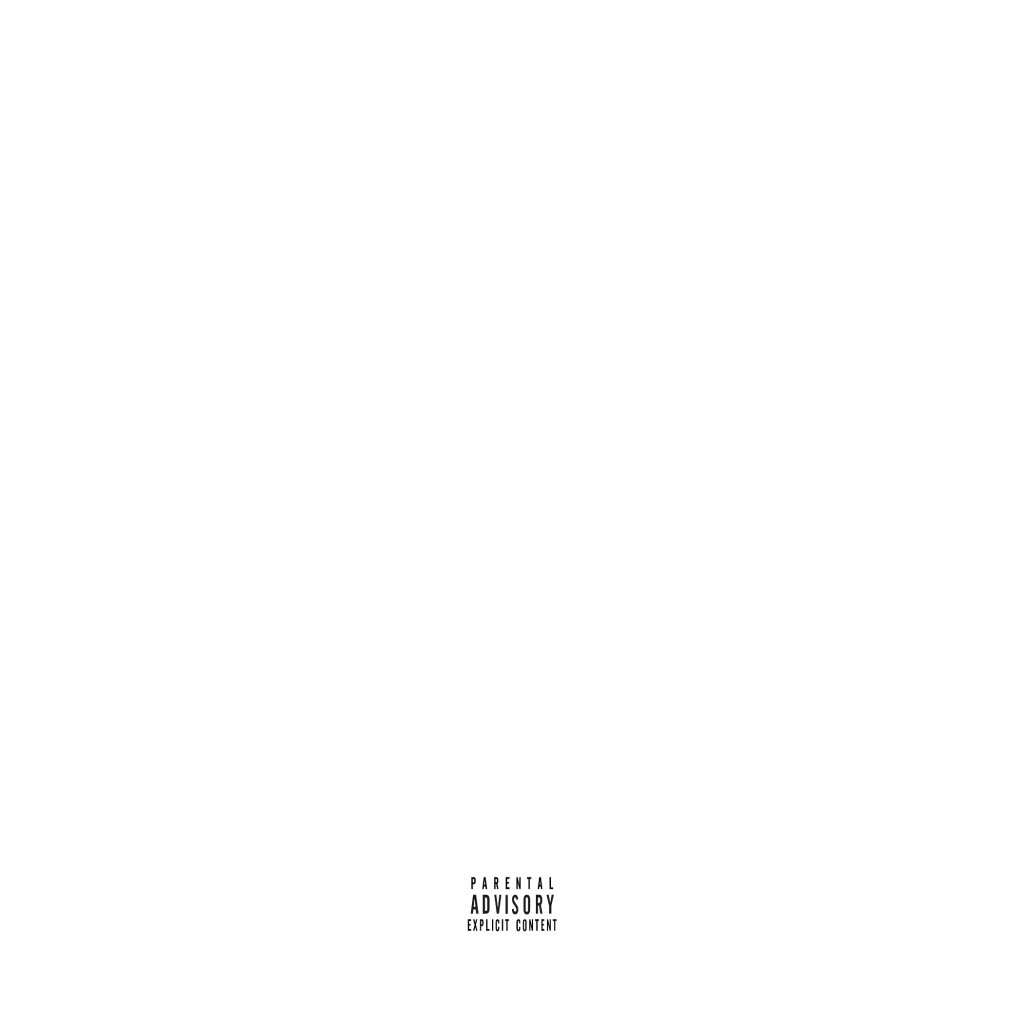

Song by Kanye West

from the album The Life of Pablo
- Released: June 14, 2016
- Recorded: 2016
- Genre: Hip-hop
- Length: 6:12
- Label: GOOD; Def Jam
- Songwriters: Kanye West; Sampha Sisay; Michael Dean; Allen Ritter; Shawn Carter; Deric Angelettie; Ronald Lawrence; Norman Whitfield; Noah Goldstein
- Producers: Kanye West; Mike Dean; Allen Ritter; Noah Goldstein

"Saint Pablo" is a song by American rapper Kanye West, featuring prominent vocals by British singer Sampha. It originally surfaced online on March 31, 2016, after it had been leaked onto Apple Music for a few hours. The song was later added to West's seventh studio album, The Life of Pablo (2016) on June 14, 2016.

== Composition ==
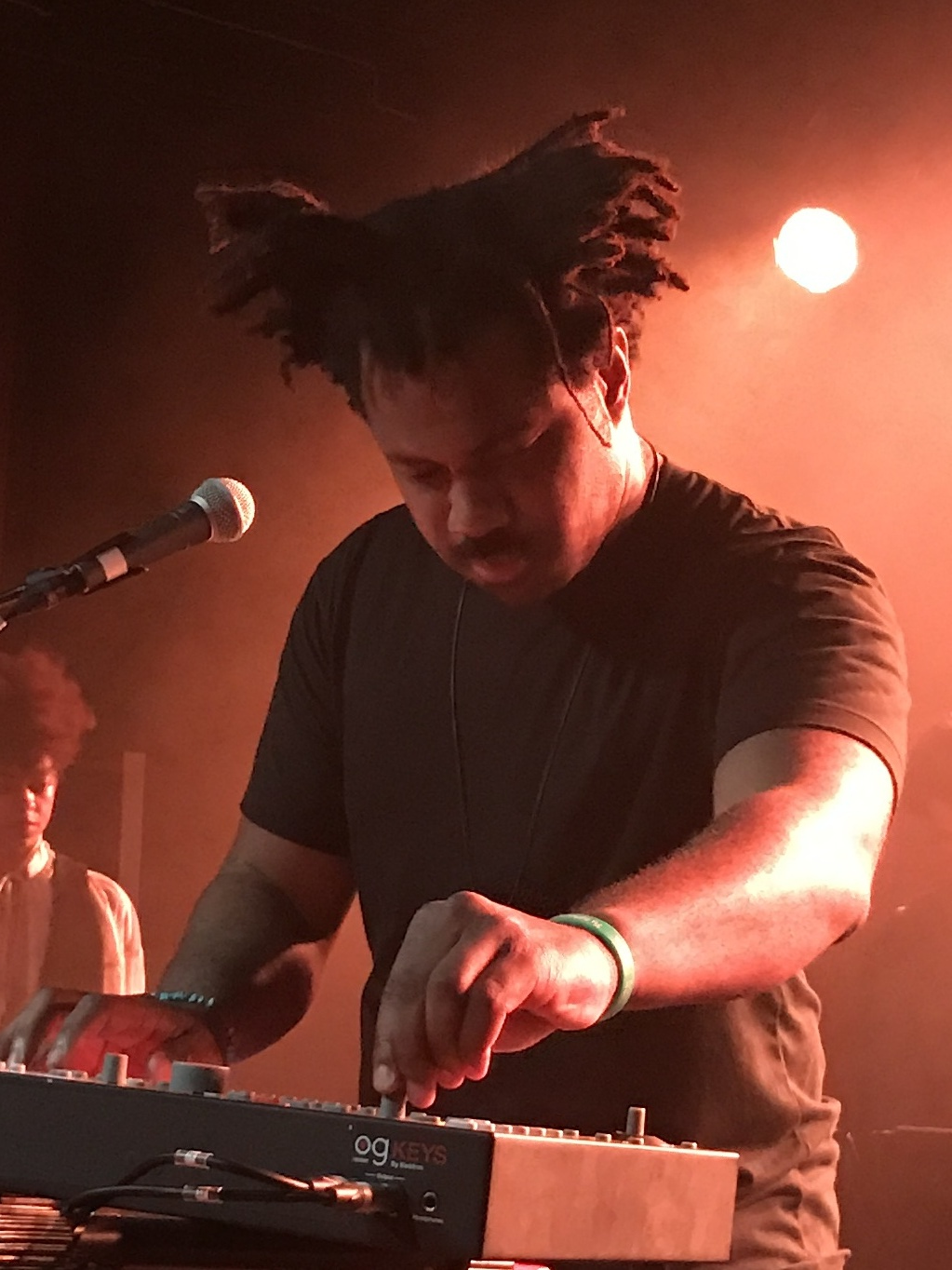
Sampha sings the hook and third verse of the song

The song addresses West's thoughts and insecurities, including multiple Twitter controversies and a debt he had of $53 million.

"Saint Pablo" was produced by West himself and Mike Dean, with co-production from Allen Ritter and additional production from Noah Goldstein. It features vocals from Sampha, who sings the hook and the third verse. The song contains samples of "Where I'm From", written by Jay-Z, Deric Angelettie, Ronald Lawrence and Norman Whitfield, and performed by Jay-Z. The piano sample also pays homage to Frédéric Chopin's "Funeral March".

=== Production ===
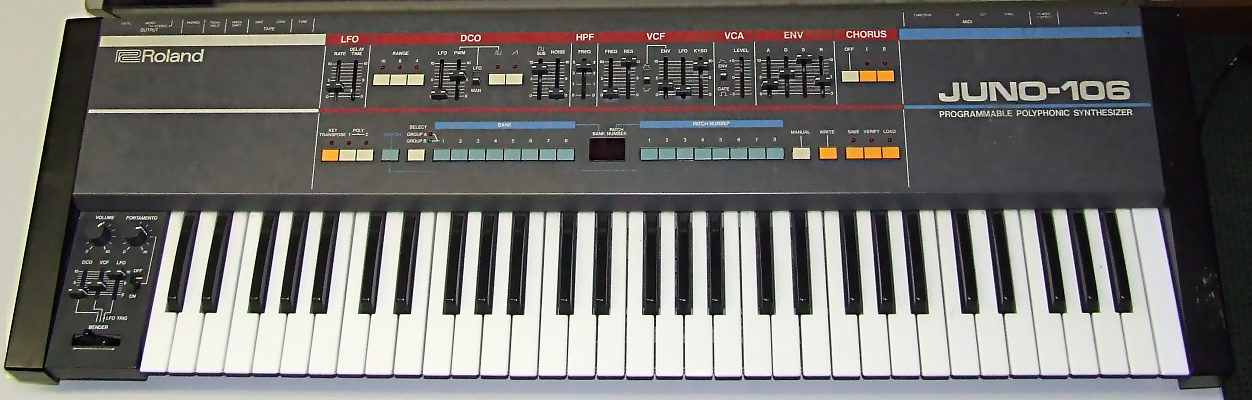
The Roland Juno-106 was used to create the song's main synth chords

Co-producer Mike Dean used several different synths when producing the song. The main synth used during West's verse was created using a Roland Juno-106. Moog synthesizers were used for an additional layer of melody, as well as the synth solo that occurs at 3:53.

== Release ==
"Saint Pablo" first premiered at Yo Gotti's The Art of Hustle release party. On March 31, 2016, the track was leaked online and appeared on Apple Music for several hours. On June 15, 2016, West temporarily removed The Life of Pablo from Tidal because he wanted to put the song into the album. The track has been made widely available on Tidal, Apple Music, Google Play Music and Spotify since this removal.

== Critical reception ==
"Saint Pablo" was met with critical acclaim. NME author Richard Owain Roberts praised the track, describing it as West being "in classically confident mode, despite the fact he opens up the epic track by admitting that he's in debt."

== Certifications ==
Region	Certification	Certified units/sales
New Zealand (RMNZ)	Gold	15,000^{‡}
United Kingdom (BPI)	Silver	200,000^{‡}
United States (RIAA)	Platinum	1,000,000^{‡}
^{‡} Sales+streaming figures based on certification alone.
