= (No One Knows Me) Like the Piano =

2016 song by Sampha

Single by Sampha

from the album Process
- Released: 12 January 2017
- Recorded: 2017
- Length: 3:38
- Label: Young Turks
- Songwriter: Sampha Sisay
- Producers: Sampha; Rodaidh McDonald

Sampha singles chronology
"Don't Touch My Hair (w/ Solange)" (2016)	"(No One Knows Me) Like the Piano" (2017)	"Close But Not Quite (w/ Everything Is Recorded)" (2017)

"(No One Knows Me) Like the Piano" is a song by British musician Sampha. The single was released on 12 January 2017 and is the third single from Sampha's debut album Process.

== Reception ==
The song is an ode to his mother and to the piano that Sampha grew up with in his family home in South London. The singer revealed in a June 2016 Fader interview that he wrote this track after moving back in with his mother in late 2014 when she was diagnosed with cancer for the second time. She died a few months later. The track has been met with positive reviews by music critics such as Pitchfork and Rolling Stone, noting that it works well with the rest of the album, and many reviewers noting it as a "highlight" of the album.

== Music video ==
The music video for "(No One Knows Me) Like the Piano" was released on 31 January 2017 in standard format and in virtual reality. It was directed by Jamie-James Medina and stars Sampha and model/actress Adwoa Aboah.

== Track listing ==
Digital download
No.	Title	Length
1.	"(No One Knows Me) Like the Piano"	3:38

== Charts ==
Chart (2017)	Peak position
France (SNEP)	183
UK Singles (OCC)	92
UK Indie (OCC)	7

== Certifications ==
Region	Certification	Certified units/sales
Canada (Music Canada)	Gold	40,000^{‡}
New Zealand (RMNZ)	Gold	15,000^{‡}
United Kingdom (BPI)	Silver	200,000^{‡}
^{‡} Sales+streaming figures based on certification alone.
