= Hold On (Sbtrkt song) =

2012 song by Sbtrkt

Single by Sbtrkt featuring Sampha

from the album Sbtrkt
- Released: 21 February 2012
- Recorded: 2011
- Genre: Electronic; UK garage; ambient house
- Length: 3:31
- Label: Young Turks
- Songwriters: Aaron Jerome; Sampha Sisay; Timmaz "Tic" Zolleyn
- Producer: SBTRKT

Sbtrkt featuring Sampha singles chronology
"Pharaohs" (2011)	"Hold On" (2012)

"Hold On" is a song by British musician Sbtrkt; the stage name of Aaron Jerome. It features on vocals Sbtrkt's main collaborator and live bandmate, Sampha. The single was released on 21 February 2012.

A cover has been recorded by Solveig Heilo from the Norwegian band Katzenjammer.

== Reception ==
The track has been met with positive reviews by music critics such as Pitchfork and AllMusic, noting that it works well with the rest of the album, and many reviewers noting it as a "highlight" of the album.

== Music video ==
The music video for "Hold On" was released on 29 March 2012. It was directed by Sam Pilling and produced by Jo-Jo Ellison.

== Track listing ==
12" vinyl and digital download
No.	Title	Length
1.	"Hold On" (featuring Sampha)	3:29
2.	"Ride to Freedom"	2:53
3.	"Hold On" (SiSi Bak Bak remix) (featuring Sampha)	6:32

US promo CD
No.	Title	Length
1.	"Hold On" (radio edit) (featuring Sampha)	3:13
2.	"Hold On" (SiSi Bak Bak remix) (featuring Sampha)	6:30

UK CD
No.	Title	Length
1.	"Hold On" (radio edit) (featuring Sampha)	3:13
2.	"Hold On" (album version) (featuring Sampha)	3:30
3.	"Hold On" (SiSi Bak Bak remix) (featuring Sampha)	6:31
4.	"Ride to Freedom"	2:54

== Charts ==
Chart (2012)	Peak position
UK Indie (OCC)	38
UK Independent Singles Breakers Chart (OCC)	8
