= Who Knows (song) =

2026 single by Daniel Caesar

Single by Daniel Caesar

from the album Son of Spergy
- Released: February 6, 2026
- Genre: Soul
- Length: 3:46
- Label: Republic
- Songwriters: Ashton Simmonds; Matthew Burnett; Dylan Wiggins; Alex O'Connor; Romil Hemnani; Mustafa Ahmed; Justin Vernon
- Producers: Daniel Caesar; Matthew Burnett; Rex Orange County; Romil Hemnani

Daniel Caesar singles chronology
"Moon" (2025)	"Who Knows" (2026)

Lyric video
- "Who Knows" on YouTube

"Who Knows" is a song by Canadian singer-songwriter Daniel Caesar. The song was released on October 24, 2025, from his fourth studio album, Son of Spergy. It was produced by Caesar himself and Matthew Burnett, with additional production from Rex Orange County and Romil Hemnani. The song was released to Italian radio stations on February 6, 2026, as the album's fourth single.

== Content ==
Critics identified "Who Knows" as one of the album's most explicit examples of Caesar's self‑interrogation and his attempt to reconcile personal history with spiritual aspiration. The song was considered as an example of Caesar's intensified focus on accountability, masculinity, and inherited patterns of behavior. Fred Garrett‑Stanley of NME described the track as part of a broader moment in which Caesar "takes accountability for the character he has become." In the song, Caesar is critical of himself regarding his own character: "Lately, I've been thinking that perhaps I am a coward / Hiding in a disguise of an ever-giving flower," an example of the album's "slightly uncomfortable masochism." It was observed that "Who Knows" contained a "self‑lacerating" tone. Irene Monokandilos of Clash noted that Caesar's reflections on manhood and emotional inadequacy form part of the album's larger confrontation with "masculinity, with faith, and with the rot of self‑importance."

== Live performances ==
Daniel Caesar performed the song on The Tonight Show Starring Jimmy Fallon on November 6, 2025.

== Charts ==
Chart performance for "Who Knows"
Chart (2025–2026)	Peak position
Canada Hot 100 (Billboard)	50
Global 200 (Billboard)	106
Indonesia (IFPI)	17
Malaysia International (RIM)	16
New Zealand Hot Singles (RMNZ)	8
Philippines (IFPI)	10
Philippines Hot 100 (Billboard Philippines)	11
Singapore (RIAS)	13
US Billboard Hot 100	52
US Hot R&B/Hip-Hop Songs (Billboard)	13

== Certifications ==
Certifications for "Who Knows"
Region	Certification	Certified units/sales
Brazil (Pro-Música Brasil)	Gold	20,000^{‡}
New Zealand (RMNZ)	Gold	15,000^{‡}
^{‡} Sales+streaming figures based on certification alone.

== Release history ==
Release history for "Who Knows"
Region	Date	Format	Label	Ref.
Various	October 24, 2025	CD; LP; digital download; streaming	Republic Records	
Italy	February 6, 2026	Radio airplay	Island	
