= Sbtrkt =

British musician and producer

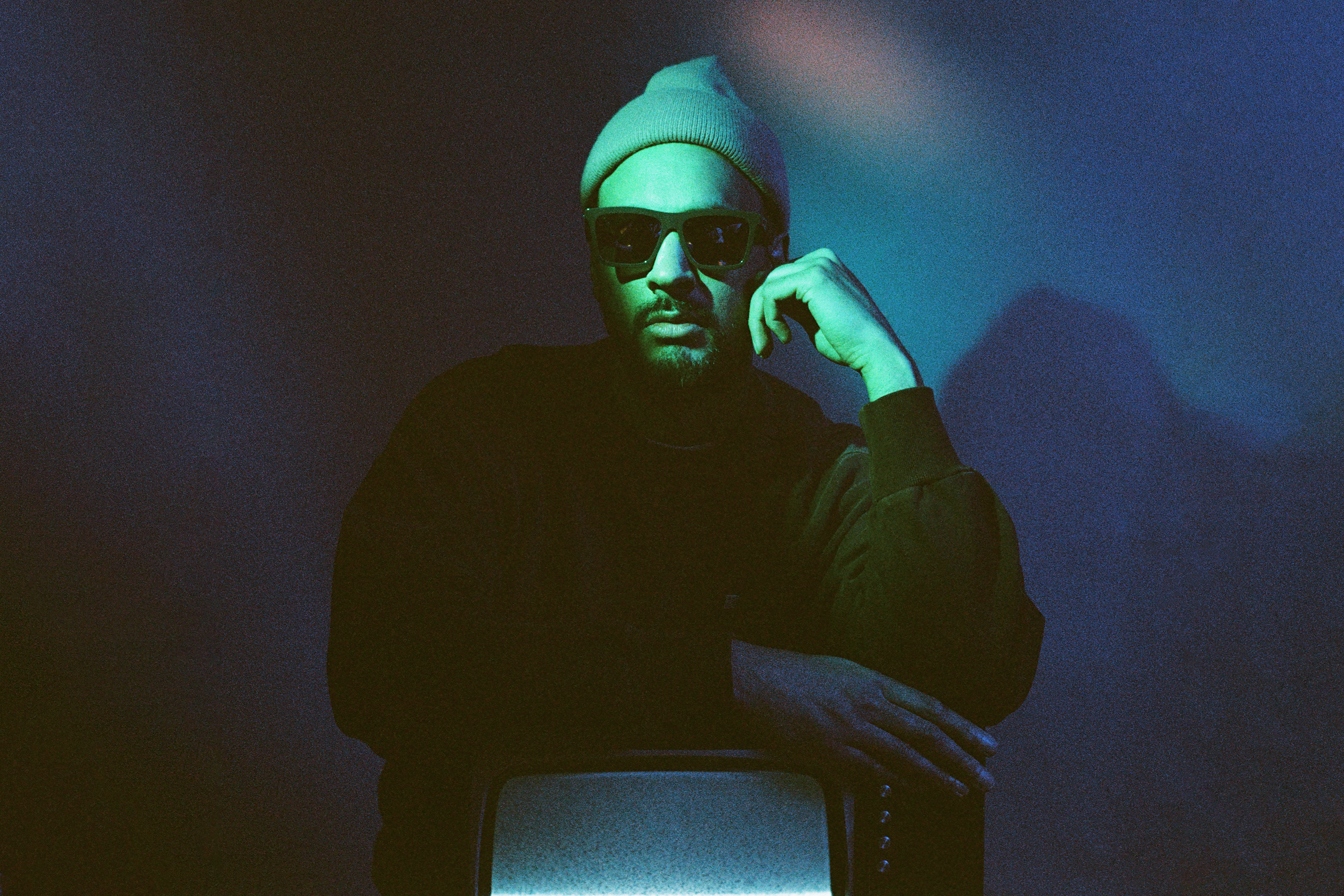
- Sbtrkt in 2023

Background information
- Born: Aaron Jerome Foulds
- Origin: Cambridgeshire, England
- Genres: indie pop; house; post-dubstep; UK garage; electronic
- Occupations: Musician; songwriter; record producer
- Years active: 2008-present
- Labels: Save Yourself; AWAL; Young; XL
- Website: www.saveyourself.tv

Aaron Jerome Foulds, known professionally as Sbtrkt (stylised as SBTRKT; disemvowelment of "subtract"), is an English musician, songwriter and record producer. Jerome has remixed songs by artists such as M.I.A, Radiohead, Modeselektor, Basement Jaxx, Mark Ronson, and Underworld, and has released singles, EPs, and four albums. His music has been playlisted by BBC Radio 1 and BBC Radio 6 Music.

Jerome also has performed live with frequent collaborator Sampha. The live show from 2010 to 2012 consisted of Jerome utilizing synthesisers, keyboards, drums and drum programming with Sampha on vocals and keyboards.

Jerome described his racial and ethnic background as "mixed-race" South Asian (Kenyan Goan and Scottish heritage). Jerome used the project's title rather than his own name in the past in order to support the concept of anonymity. Jerome previously explained "[I'd] rather not talk about myself as a person, and let the music speak for itself. The name SBTRKT is me taking myself away from that whole process. I'm not a social person, so having to talk to DJs to make them play a record is not something I want to do. It's more about giving them a record as an anonymous person and seeing whether they like it or not. If they play it, they play it." Jerome used to wear masks inspired by ceremonial masks from South America and South Asia, using nature as an inspiration, designed by the anonymous designer "A Hidden Place".

In March 2016, Jerome announced a new project described as a 'non album'. The collection of songs and project is designed to bring new tracks to fans sooner than album cycles and also be a continuous ongoing experience. In June 2022, Jerome announced that new music would be released later in the year. He released The Rat Road, his first album in nine years, in May 2023.

== Sbtrkt live members ==
- Sbtrkt – composer, synths, keyboards, drum machines, drums, backing vocals (2010–present)
- Sampha – vocals, keyboards, percussion (2010–2013), guest vocalist (2014–2015)
- Jimmy Holdom – drums (2014–2015, 2023-present)
- Fabiana Palladino – synths, keyboards, percussion (2014–2015)
- Tev'n – vocals, synths, keyboards, percussion (2015, 2023–present)
- Leilah – vocals (2023–present)

== Discography ==
=== Studio albums ===
- Sbtrkt (2011)
- Wonder Where We Land (2014)
- The Rat Road (2023)

=== Mixtapes ===
- Save Yourself (2016)

=== EPs ===
- 2020 (2010)
- Step in Shadows (2010)
- Transitions I (2014)
- Transitions II (2014)
- Transitions III (2014)
- L.F.O. (2023)
- OUTSPOKEN (2024)
- All the Time (2024)

=== Other ===
- "Laika" (Brainmath Records, 2009)
- Live 2013 – live album of SBTRKT's self-titled album
- IMO (2013) – taken from the Young Turks 2013 compilation

=== Singles ===
- "Break Off/Evening Glow" (with Sampha) (2010) – Ramp Recordings
- "Midnight Marauder" (with Sinden) (2010) – Grizzly
- "Soundboy Shift" (2010)
- "Nervous" (with Jessie Ware) (2010) – Numbers
- "Living Like I Do" (feat. Sampha) (2011, 12" Ltd)
- "Ready Set Loop / Twice Bitten" (2011, 12" Ltd, Gre) – SBTRKT
- "Wildfire" (feat. Little Dragon and Drake) (2011, 12" Ltd)
- "Pharaohs" (feat. Roses Gabor) (2011)
- "Hold On" (feat. Sampha) (2012, 12" Ltd)
- '"Temporary View" (feat. Sampha) (2014)
- "New Dorp. New York." (feat. Ezra Koenig) (2014)
- "I Feel Your Pain" (feat. DRAM and Mabel) (2016)
- "Bodmin Moor" (2022)
- "Miss the Days" (2022)
- "Ghost" (feat. Leilah) (2022)
- "Forward" (feat. Leilah) (2022)
- "Waiting" (feat. Teezo Touchdown) (2023)
- "Days Go By" (feat. Toro y Moi) (2023)
- "L.F.O." (feat. Sampha and George Riley) (2023)
- "No Intention" (feat. Leilah) (2023)
- "Bet You Never" (2024)
- "Volca" (2024)
- "Back On" (2024)
- "Classic Theme" (2024)
- "Outspoken" (2024)
- "Turn Your Heart Around" (2024)
