= Blue Roses (Blue Roses album) =

Studio album by Blue Roses
- Released: 27 April 2009
- Length: 45:13
- Label: XL
- Producer: Laura Groves

Laura Groves chronology
Blue Roses (2009)	Radio Red (2023)

Blue Roses is the debut studio album by Laura Groves under the pseudonym Blue Roses, released on 27 April 2009 through XL Recordings. It received generally positive reviews from critics.

== Critical reception ==
Professional ratings
Aggregate scores
Source	Rating
Metacritic	73/100
Review scores
Source	Rating
AllMusic	3/5 stars
The Guardian	3/5 stars
MusicOMH	4/5 stars
NME	4/5 stars
Pitchfork	7.8/10
PopMatters	6/10

Blue Roses received a score of 73 out of 100 on review aggregator Metacritic based on seven critics' reviews, indicating "generally favorable" reception. Rob Webb of NME found it to be "a dizzyingly beautiful set of delicate folk songs that sound like they've been sprinkled with pixie dust and reincarnated from some perfect bygone age". MusicOMH's Michael Cragg described it as "a startling debut, a record that oozes warmth and charm whilst revealing itself slowly and patiently. It's the kind of album that you’ll want to recommend and that suits a word-of-mouth popularity".

Grayson Haver Currin of Pitchfork felt that the album "makes it clear that Groves is inordinately talented and working with big portions of audacity and acumen. It's the sort of debut that puts Groves in the company of recent giants, both with its dramatic compositional flair and in its mix of homemade humility and major accomplishment". Reviewing the album for PopMatters, John Bergstrom called it "alternately impressive, surprising, aloof, and exhausting" and "when it succeeds it sounds like the work of someone who could leave a lasting mark".

Michael Hann of The Guardian wrote that "the 10 songs here tend towards the emotionally overwrought" and "those with a low tolerance for navel-gazing are advised to steer clear, but there's plenty to cherish here". James Christopher Monger of AllMusic complimented its "earnest yet elusive wordplay, serpentine melodies, and minimal arrangements lithely follow the trail blazed by the current crop of postmillennial retro fairy tale crooners like Joanna Newsom, Tiny Vipers, and Laura Barrett" but noted that "the pace is sluggish at best, resulting in a collection of songs best listened to in threes".

== Track listing ==
Blue Roses track listing
No.	Title	Length
1.	"Greatest Thoughts"	4:02
2.	"Cover Your Tracks"	5:00
3.	"I Am Leaving"	3:26
4.	"Can't Sleep"	5:17
5.	"I Wish I..."	6:53
6.	"Coast"	4:06
7.	"Does Anyone Love Me Now?"	4:08
8.	"Doubtful Comforts"	4:09
9.	"Rebecca"	4:20
10.	"Imaginary Fights"	3:52
Total length:		45:13

== Charts ==
Chart performance for Blue Roses
Chart (2009)	Peak position
UK Independent Albums (OCC)	29
