= Sierra Leone–United Kingdom relations =

- Sierra Leone: United Kingdom

Diplomatic mission
- Sierra Leone High Commission London: British High Commission Freetown

Envoy
- High Commissioner Morie Komba Manyeh: High Commissioner Josephine Gauld LVO

== Embassy ==
Josephine Gauld was appointed British High Commissioner to Sierra Leone in September 2024, in succession to Lisa Chesney.

== Trade ==
In 2024, Sierra Leone was the UK's 148th largest trading partner accounting for less than 0.1% of total UK trade. Total trade in goods and services (exports plus imports) between the two countries was £99 million, an increase of 22.2% or £18 million from 2023.

== See also ==
- Foreign relations of Sierra Leone
- Foreign relations of the United Kingdom
- Sierra Leone Colony and Protectorate (1808–1961)
