= Don't Touch My Hair =

Song by Solange featuring Sampha

from the album A Seat at the Table
- Released: September 30, 2016
- Genre: Alternative R&B
- Length: 4:17
- Label: Saint; Columbia
- Songwriters: Solange Knowles; Sampha
- Producers: Solange Knowles; Sampha; Dave Andrew Sitek; Patrick Wimberly; Bryndon Cook

Solange chronology
"Cranes in the Sky" (2016)	"Don't Touch My Hair" (2016)

Sampha singles chronology
"Blood On Me" (2016)	"Don't Touch My Hair" (2011)	"(No One Knows Me) Like the Piano" (2017)

"Don't Touch My Hair" is the ninth track on American singer and songwriter Solange Knowles' third studio album, A Seat at the Table. It was released by Saint Records and Columbia Records on September 30, 2016, with its music video being released the following week. It was written by Knowles and Sampha Sisay.

== Background and writing ==
Knowles spent four years working on the album, including the track "Don't Touch My Hair". During the writing of "Don't Touch My Hair" and the creation of the full album, she has posted personal essays on her website, Saint Heron, linking the ideas of these personal essays with messages in the album. One essay that has been linked to the creation and writing of "Don't Touch My Hair" would be ""And Do You Belong? I Do." In this she says "You and your friends have been called the N-word, been approached as prostitutes, and have had your hair touched in a predominantly white bar just around the corner from the same venue."

== Music video ==
Solange Knowles debuted the music video for "Don't Touch My Hair" on October 2, 2016, on YouTube. It was directed by Alan Ferguson. In the music video there are an abundance of different hairstyles like Marcel waves, brushed out curls, beaded braids, afros, and then a crown of looped braids. It shows Knowles and cast of dancers swaying back and forth between frames, all moving in soft and elegant steps with the warm harmonies and falsetto, giving the music video a very gentle, yet strong tone because of the overall message and the facial expressions shown on Knowles and the dancers. The hair styling for the video was done by Nikki Nelms.

== Reception ==
Rolling Stone said the track "uses sparkling synths and drowsy horns as broadsides against those who might deny Knowles and other black women their bodily autonomy", conveying a message of brutal honesty in tender and rich harmonies. Pitchfork's Sheldon Pearce wrote that "'Don’t Touch My Hair' moves at a heartbeat’s pulse, subtle and steady, yet vibrant" and "can be read as an explicit rejection of this behavior (the devalue and alienation of black spaces), as a simple establishment of boundaries, or as a powerful pledge of personal identity."

Natelegé Whaley, writing for The Huffington Post, gave the song a positive review, highlighting in particular the importance of its message of praising black women's hair during such a socially volatile period: "Hair is used as a metaphor for our entire essence on this track and is the perfect symbol, as our hair is one thing that has always been policed throughout history and into the present." Writing for Vogue, Eviana Hartman found the song to be an uplifting message about hair, and noted how its message relates to a specific community while also being accessible and relevant to the broader community of women in general.

Despite it not being released as a single, "Don't Touch My Hair" debuted and peaked, at 91 on the Billboard Hot 100 chart, on the week ending October 22, 2016, dropping off the chart the next week.

== Charts ==
Chart (2016)	Peak position
US Billboard Hot 100	91
US Hot R&B/Hip-Hop Songs (Billboard)	38
