= Blood on Me =

2016 song by Sampha

Single by Sampha

from the album Process
- Released: 25 August 2016
- Recorded: 2016
- Length: 4:06
- Label: Young Turks
- Songwriter(s): Sampha Sisay
- Producer(s): Sampha; Rodaidh McDonald

Sampha singles chronology
"Timmy's Prayer" (2016)	"Blood on Me" (2016)	"(No One Knows Me) Like The Piano" (2017)

"Blood on Me" is a song by British musician Sampha. The single was released on 25 August 2016.

== Reception ==
The track has been met with positive reviews by music critics such as Pitchfork and AllMusic, noting that it works well with the rest of the album, and many reviewers noting it as a "highlight" of the album.

== Music video ==
The music video for "Blood on Me" was released on 16 September 2016. It was directed by Alex Lill.

== Track listing ==
Digital download
No.	Title	Length
1.	"Blood on Me"	4:06

== Charts ==
Chart (2017)	Peak position
UK Indie (OCC)	36
