= Further Out Than the Edge =

2023 album by Speakers Corner Quartet

Studio album by Speakers Corner Quartet
- Released: 2 June 2023
- Recorded: 2016–2023
- Genres: Jazz; electronica; soul; R&B; hip hop
- Length: 49:18
- Label: OTIH
- Producer: Speakers Cornet Quartet

Speakers Corner Quartet chronology
Further Out Than the Edge (2023)	Mr Loverman (Original Score) (2024)

Singles from Further Out Than the Edge
- 1. "Can We Do This?" Released: 15 February 2023; 2. "Fix" Released: 22 March 2023; 3. "On Grounds" Released: 12 April 2023; 4. "Geronimo Blues" Released: 3 May 2023; 5. "Soapbox Soliloquy" Released: 24 May 2023

Further Out Than the Edge is the debut studio album by South London jazz band Speakers Corner Quartet, released on 2 June 2023, by OTIH Records. The album features guest appearances from Coby Sey, Kelsey Lu, Tirzah, Confucius MC, Joe Armon-Jones, Léa Sen, Kae Tempest, Sampha, Leilah, James Massiah, Tawiah, Lafawndah, Trustfall, Shabaka Hutchings, and Mica Levi. It received positive reviews.

== Background ==
Speakers Corner Quartet was formed in 2006. The group derived their name from the open mic spoken word and hip-hop jam night at the Brixton Jamm nightclub where they performed as the house band. Since forming, the group has worked with artists including Sampha, Kae Tempest, Tirzah, Dean Blunt, MF Doom, Lianne La Havas, Mica Levi, Chris Ofili and Herbie Hancock. The group consists of Alan Ross "Biscuit" Harris on flute, Giles Kwakeulati "Kwake Bass" King-Ashong on drums & percussion, Peter Bennie on bass, and Raven Bush on violin.

The album began production in 2016 when Biscuit started editing recordings of the band's jam sessions, splicing, chopping, looping, and self-sampling the band's instrumentals. Over the next seven years, the group worked with various London musicians that they had previously collaborated with to bring vocal performances and additional instrumentation to the album. All vocals on the album are from guest features.

== Release ==
On 15 February 2023, Speakers Corner Quartet released the album's first single "Can We Do This?" featuring English singer Sampha. On 22 March 2023, the album's second single "Fix" featuring English singer Tirzah was released. The album's third single, "On Grounds" featuring English singer Coby Sey, was released on 12 April 2023. On 3 May 2023, the album's fourth single "Geronimo Blues" featuring English poet Kae Tempest was released. The album's fifth single, "Soapbox Soliloquy" featuring British singer Leilah, was released on 24 May 2023. The album released on 2 June 2023. A deluxe edition of the album was released on 10 November 2023.

== Critical reception ==
Professional ratings
Aggregate scores
Source	Rating
Metacritic	68/100
Review scores
Source	Rating
Clash Magazine	8/10
Loud and Quiet	9/10
The Observer	5/5 stars
Pitchfork	7.1/10

According to the review aggregator Metacritic, Further Out Than The Edge received "generally favorable reviews" based on a weighted average score of 68 out of 100 from 5 critic scores.

Ammar Kalia of The Observer praised the album's instrumentation as "remarkably cohesive" with "dark, downbeat textures" that support the album's features. Writing for Resident Advisor, Fred Garratt-Stanley praised the album's instrumentation as a mix of "sparse, hip-hop-speckled rhythm sections with expressive jazz melodies and flashes of abstract orchestral instrumentation." He also praised the writing from the album's guest appearances for its "politically conscious storytelling, exposing social dilemmas and inequalities with clarity and grit." Clash Magazine's Ana Lamond praised the album's instrumentation, writing: "Melding together the freeing elements of jazz with subtle electronics and poetry, the group’s succinct instrumentation ties everything together into one, cohesive body of work." Philip Sherburne of Pitchfork describes the album as "elegant, reflective, and immaculately constructed" and "reflects the group’s open-mic origins." Writing for Loud and Quiet, Dhruva Balram praised the album's production as "making each of the individual guests’ talents shine even brighter." Ammar Kalia of Crack described the album as "remarkably precise yet genre-fluid".

=== Accolades ===
Publication	Accolade	Rank	Ref.
Clash	Albums Of The Year 2023	51	
Crack	The Top 50 Albums of the Year	28	

== Track listing ==
All tracks are written by Alan Ross Harris, Giles Kwakeulati King-Ashong, Peter Bennie, and Raven Bush.

Further Out Than the Edge track listing
No.	Title	Length
1.	"On Grounds" (with Coby Sey)	3:10
2.	"Acute Truth" (with Kelsey Lu)	3:41
3.	"Fix" (with Tirzah)	2:39
4.	"Wavelet" (with Confucius MC and Joe Armon-Jones)	3:25
5.	"Dreaded!" (with Léa Sen)	4:03
6.	"Geronimo Blues" (with Kae Tempest)	4:26
7.	"Can We Do This?" (with Sampha)	2:57
8.	"Soapbox Soliloquy" (with LEILAH)	3:58
9.	"Hither Green" (with James Massiah)	2:42
10.	"Round Again" (with Tawiah)	4:45
11.	"Behind The Sun" (with Lafawndah and Trustfall)	6:40
12.	"Shabz Needs Sun" (with Shabaka Hutchings)	1:45
13.	"Karainagar" (with Mica Levi)	5:21
Total length:		49:18

Deluxe edition (bonus tracks)
No.	Title	Length
1.	"Can We Do This? - Original Demo" (with Sampha)	1:31
2.	"Take Your Dreams Off Of The Shelf" (with Laraaji)	4:21
3.	"Scorpion Yard" (with Mica Levi)	6:14
4.	"Wavelet - Live at The Portico" (with Confucius MC and Joe Armon-Jones)	3:53
5.	"Fix - Live at The Portico" (with Tirzah)	2:50
6.	"Geronimo Blues - Live at The Portico" (with Kae Tempest)	5:20
7.	"On Grounds - Live at The Portico" (with Coby Sey)	4:44
8.	"Can We Do This? - Instrumental"	2:58
9.	"On Grounds - Instrumental"	3:14
10.	"Soapbox Soliloquy - Instrumental"	3:40
Total length:		88:03
