= Dual (EP) =

EP by Sampha
- Released: 29 July 2013
- Length: 17:22
- Label: Young Turks
- Producer: Sampha

Sampha chronology
Sundanza (2010)	Dual (2013)	Process (2017)

Dual is an EP released in July 2013 by British electronic music singer, songwriter and producer Sampha from Morden, South London, United Kingdom.

== Critical reception ==
Professional ratings
Review scores
Source	Rating
NME	7/10 stars
Pitchfork	7.4/10

Dual received positive reviews from most music critics. Zach Kelly of Pitchfork Media stated, "For someone so willing to lay himself this bare as a first impression is rare, but in terms of the music found on 'Dual', nothing could be more natural."

== Track listing ==
All tracks are written by Sampha.

No.	Title	Length
1.	"Demons"	0:54
2.	"Beneath the Tree"	4:00
3.	"Without"	3:46
4.	"Hesitant Oath"	0:36
5.	"Indecision"	4:28
6.	"Can't Get Close"	3:38
Total length:		17:22

== Personnel ==
- Sampha - Composer, Mixing, Primary Artist, Producer
- Ben Walker - Artwork

== Charts ==
Original release

Chart (2013)	Peak position
UK Independent Albums (OCC)	34
UK Dance Albums (OCC)	17
UK Independent Albums Breakers Chart (OCC)	5

2024 re-issue

Chart (2024)	Peak position
UK Official Record Store Chart (OCC)	19
