= Laura Groves =

English musician

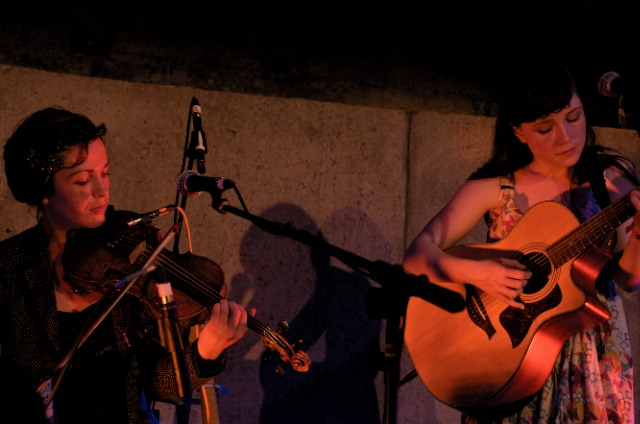
- Laura Groves as Blue Roses at The Great Escape Festival in 2009

Background information
- Also known as: Blue Roses
- Born: Laura Margaret Groves; 1987 (age 38–39)
- Origin: Shipley, West Yorkshire, England
- Genres: Alternative pop; avant-pop; soul; folk
- Occupations: Singer; songwriter; musician; producer
- Instruments: Vocals; keyboards; guitar
- Years active: 2009–present
- Labels: Bella Union; DEEK; XL
- Website: Official website

Laura Groves (born 1987) is an English musician originally from Shipley, West Yorkshire, England. Her debut album, Blue Roses, was released in 2009 on XL Recordings under the alias Blue Roses. Groves now lives in London and is releasing music under her own name. The Thinking about Thinking EP came out in 2013, followed by the Committed Language EP in February 2015 and the EP A Private Road in 2020. Laura Groves and her band played a string of dates in support of Elbow and Glass Animals.

== Discography ==
=== Studio albums ===
- Blue Roses as Blue Roses (XL/Salvia, 2009)
- Radio Red (Bella Union Records, 2023)

=== EPs ===
- Doubtful Comforts (XL, 2009)
- Does Anyone Love Me Now? (XL, 2009)
- Thinking About Thinking (DEEK, 2013)
- Committed Language (DEEK, 2015)
- A Private Road (Bella Union, 2020)
- Yes (Bella Union, 2025)

=== Singles ===
- "I Am Leaving" (XL/Salvia, 2007)
- "Courtyard" (self-released, 2020)
- "Friday" (live) (self-released, 2020)
- "Inky Sea" (live) (self-released, 2020)
- "Sky at Night" (Bella Union Records, 2023)
- "Yes" (2026), featuring Joviale and Fabiana Palladino
