= Sampha =

English singer and musician

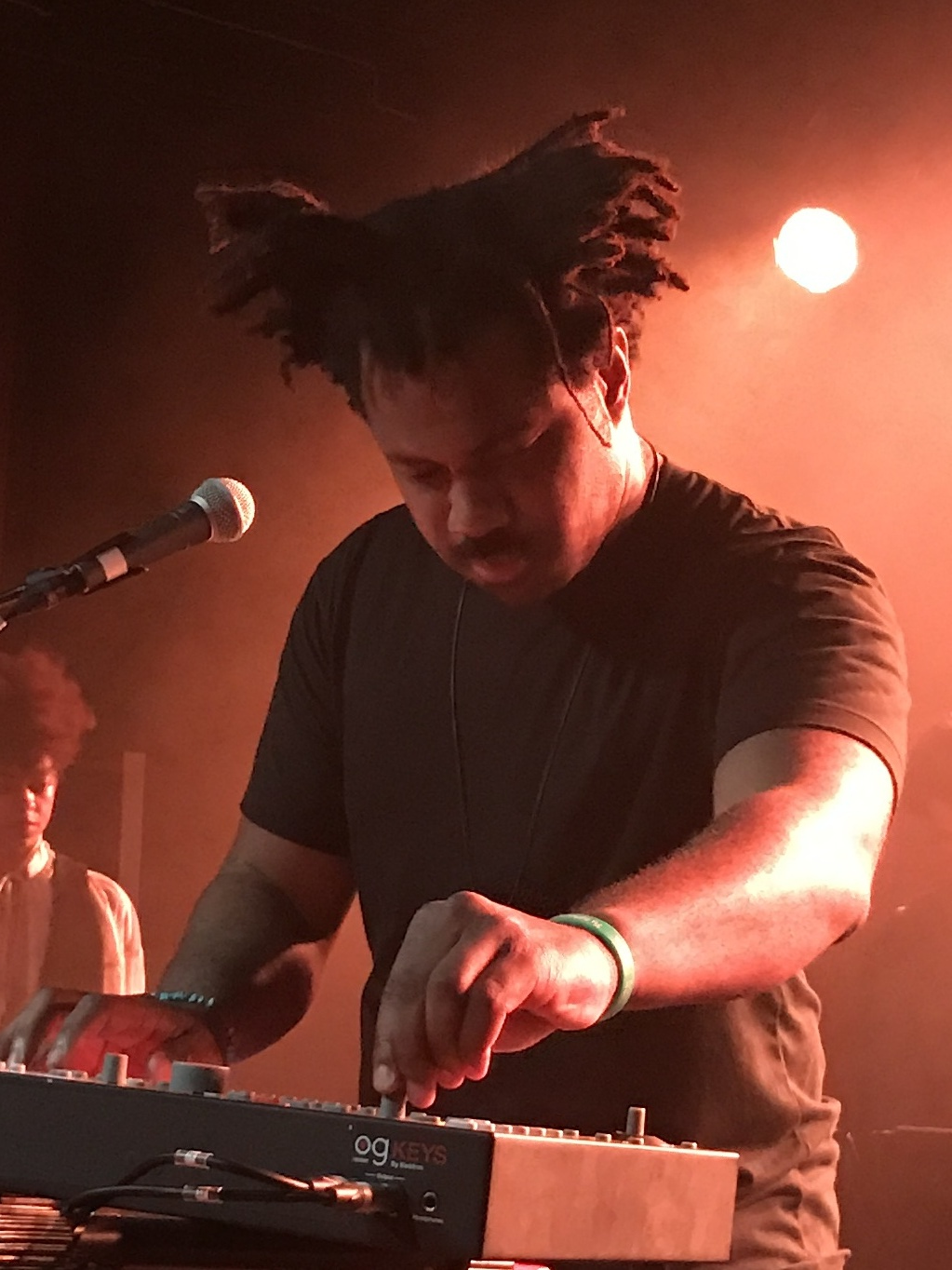
- Sampha performing in 2016

Background information
- Born: Sampha Lahai Sisay; 16 November 1988 (age 38); Morden, London, England
- Genres: Electronic; neo soul; alternative R&B
- Occupations: Singer; songwriter; musician; record producer
- Children: 1
- Instruments: Vocals; keyboards; percussion
- Works: Sampha discography
- Years active: 2009–present
- Labels: Young; XL
- Website: sampha.com

Sampha Lahai Sisay (born 16 November 1988) is a British singer, songwriter, musician and record producer from Morden, South London. Sampha has collaborated with Drake, Kendrick Lamar, Frank Ocean, SBTRKT, Jessie Ware, Alicia Keys, Gorillaz, Florence + the Machine, Travis Scott, Kanye West, Daniel Caesar, Solange and others. Sampha has released two solo EPs: Sundanza (2010) and Dual (2013). Sampha's debut album, Process, was released on 3 February 2017 by Young and won the 2017 Mercury Prize. His second album, Lahai, was released on 20 October 2023.

== Early years ==
Sampha was born in Morden, South London to Sierra Leonean parents and is the youngest of five brothers. His introduction to music began with learning to play on the piano at his parents' home in Morden and listening to records given to him by his older siblings. As a teenager he discovered music production after his older brother, Sanie, built himself a makeshift home studio. He went to Ewell Castle School, studying A-Level music; in 2017 he returned to open a new music studio building. Sampha briefly attended Chester University.

== Career ==
In 2007, Sampha met London producer Kwes, whose music Sampha said changed his life, through Myspace. Kwes guided him and introduced him to musicians, Mica "Micachu" Levi, Ghostpoet, and Dels as well as his future record label Young (known then as Young Turks). In 2009 Sampha interned at the label. Also through Young, Sampha remixed "Basic Space" by The xx and met his earliest collaborators: SBTRKT, Jessie Ware, Bullion and Lil Silva. Sampha is also the cousin of grime artist Flirta D from the grime music group SLK.

In 2017, Sampha released his first album, Process, to critical acclaim. The album won Sampha the Mercury Prize for best album of the year. He released his second album Lahai in 2023, also to critical acclaim.

== Personal life ==
Sampha's first child, a daughter, was born in the spring of 2020.

== Discography ==
- Process (2017)
- Lahai (2023)

== Awards and nominations ==
Year	Organisation	Award	Work	Result
2013	BBC	Sound of 2014	Himself	Fourth
2017	Mercury Prize	Album of the Year	Process	Won
2017	Soul Train Music Awards	Best Collaboration	"Don't Touch My Hair" (with Solange Knowles)	Nominated
2017	Soul Train Music Awards	Best Dance Performance	"Don't Touch My Hair" (with Solange Knowles)	Nominated
2018	Worldwide Awards	Album of the Year	Process	Won
2018	BRIT Awards	Brit Award for British Breakthrough Act	Himself	Nominated
2018	Ivor Novello Awards	Best Song, Musically and Lyrically	"No One Knows Me (Like the Piano)"	Nominated
2023	Grammy Awards	Album of the Year	Mr. Morale & the Big Steppers (as a featured artist and songwriter)	Nominated
2024	Ivor Novello Award	Best Album	Lahai	Nominated
2024	Ivor Novello Award	Best Song, Musically and Lyrically	"Spirit 2.0"	Nominated
2024	American Association of Independent Music Libera Awards	Best R&B Record	Lahai	Won
2024	AIM Independent Music Awards	Best Independent Track	"Spirit 2.0"	Won
2024	AIM Independent Music Awards	Best Independent Video	"Only" (directed by Dexter Navy)	Won
