= List of awards and nominations received by FKA Twigs =

FKA Twigs awards and nominations
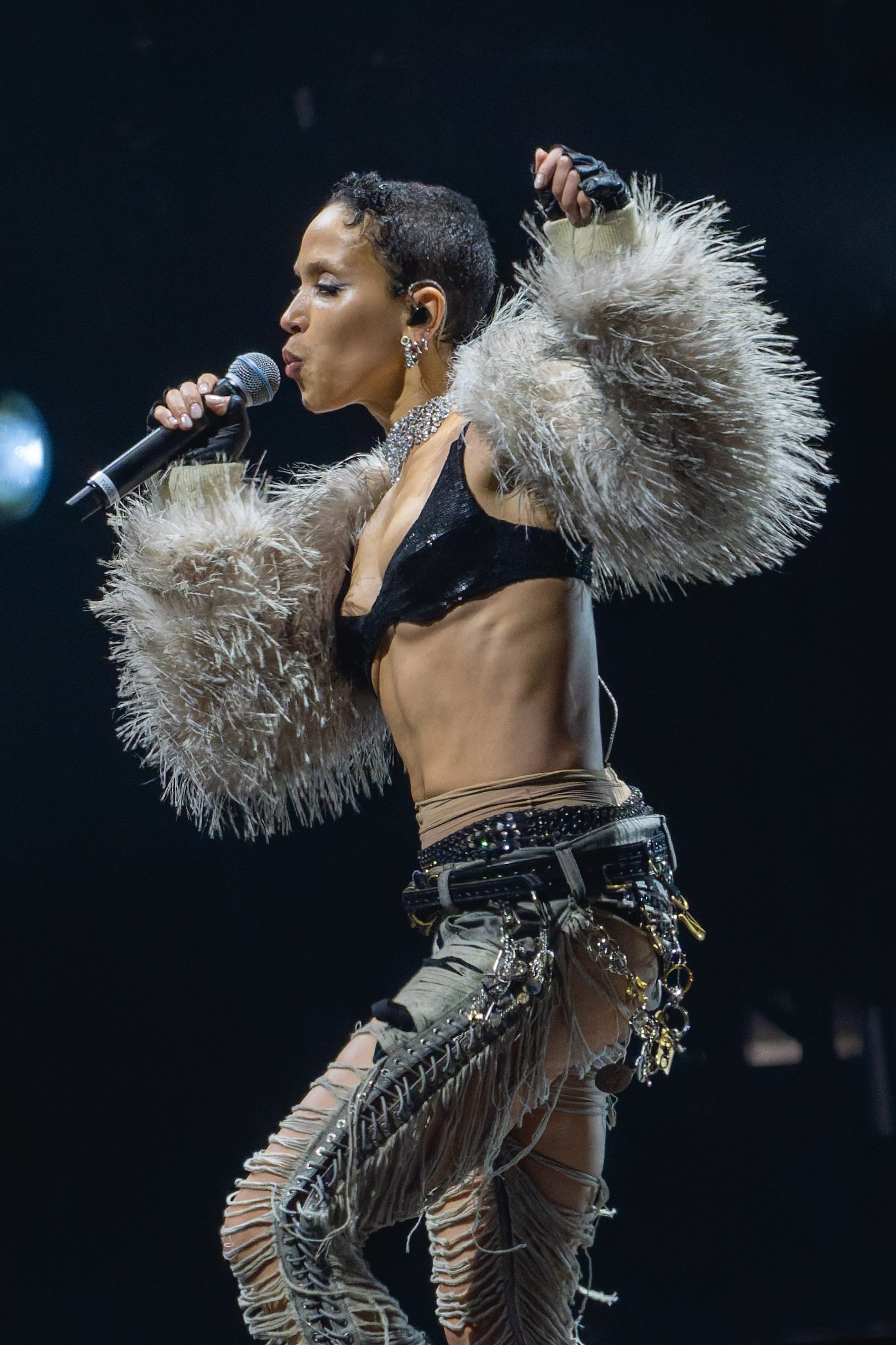
- FKA Twigs performing in 2025
Awards and nominations
Award	Wins	Nominations
Grammy	1	2
Libera Award	2	10
BET Award	0	1
Brit Awards	0	3
MTV Europe Music Awards	1	1
MTV Video Music Awards	0	8
MOBO Awards	1	3
Music Producers Guild Awards	2	3
UK Music Video Awards	7	16
YouTube Music Awards	1	1

Totals (Note: Certain award groups do not simply award one winner. They acknowledge several different recipients, have runners-up, and have third place. Since this is a specific recognition and is different from losing an award, runner-up mentions are considered wins in this award tally. For simplification and to avoid errors, each award in this list has been presumed to have had a prior nomination.)
- Wins: 24
- Nominations: 42

English singer FKA Twigs has a total of 23 awards and 42 nominations.

She has won a Grammy Award, a MOBO Award, two UK Music Video Awards, two Music Producers Guild Awards, one YouTube Music Awards, a The South Bank Sky Arts Awards and an AIM Independent Music Awards. In addition to her wins, FKA Twigs has been nominated for three Brit Awards, eight MTV Video Music Awards, one Billboard Music Award and one BET Award. Her single "Cellophane" received a Grammy Award nomination for Best Music Video.

== A2IM Libera Awards ==
The A2IM Libera Awards is an annual music awards show created by the American Association of Independent Music.

Year	Category	Nominated work	Result	Ref.
2015	Album of the Year	LP1	Nominated	
2015	Groundbreaking Album of the Year	LP1	Nominated	
2015	Video of the Year	"Two Weeks"	Won	
2015	Best Sync Usage	"Video Girl" in Google Glass commercial	Nominated	
2016	Video of the Year	M3LL155X	Nominated	
2020	Album of the Year	Magdalene	Nominated	
2020	Best R&B Album	Magdalene	Nominated	
2020	Marketing Genius	Magdalene	Nominated	
2020	Video of the Year	"Cellophane"	Won	
2021	Video of the Year	"sad day"	Won	

== AIM Independent Music Awards ==
The AIM Independent Music Awards, hosted by the Association of Independent Music (AIM), were established in 2011 to recognise artists signed to independent record labels in the United Kingdom. Most of the categories and nominations are selected by an independent judging panel, though some are decided by the public.

Year	Category	Nominated work	Result	Ref.
2014	Independent Video of the Year	"Water Me"	Nominated	
2014	Independent Track of the Year	"Water Me"	Nominated	
2015	Independent Track of the Year	"Two Weeks"	Won	
2015	Independent Breakthrough of the year	Herself	Nominated	
2015	Most Played Independent Act	Herself	Nominated	
2019	Independent Track of the Year	"Cellophane"	Nominated	
2019	Independent Video of the Year	"Cellophane"	Nominated	
2020	Best Second Album	Magdalene	Won	
2022	Independent Track of the Year	"Tears in the Club" (featuring The Weeknd)	Nominated	
2022	Independent Video of the Year	"Tears in the Club" (featuring The Weeknd)	Nominated	
2022	Best Independent EP/Mixtape	Caprisongs	Nominated	

== BBC Sound of... ==
The Sound of... is an annual BBC poll of music critics and industry figures to find the most promising new music talent.

Year	Category	Nominated work	Result	Ref.
2014	Sound of 2014	Herself	Nominated	

== Berlin Music Video Awards ==
The Berlin Music Video Awards is an international festival that promotes the art of music videos.

Year	Category	Nominated work	Result	R
2021	Best Visual Effects	Sad Day	3rd Place	
2022	Best Editor	Tears in the Club FT. THE WEEKND	Nominated	
2025	Best Editor	Eusexua	Won	

== BET Award ==
The BET Awards were established in 2001 by the Black Entertainment Television network to celebrate African Americans and other minorities in music, acting, sports, and other fields of entertainment.

Year	Category	Nominated work	Result	Ref.
2015	Best International Act: UK	Herself	Nominated	

== Billboard Music Awards ==
The Billboard Music Awards are held to honor artists for commercial performance in the U.S., based on record charts published by Billboard magazine.

Year	Category	Nominated work	Result	Ref.
2022	Top Dance/Electronic Album	Caprisongs	Nominated	

== Brit Award ==
The Brit Awards are the British Phonographic Industry's (BPI) annual pop music awards.

Year	Category	Nominated work	Result	Ref.
2015	British Breakthrough Act	Herself	Nominated	
2015	British Female Solo Artist	Herself	Nominated	
2020	British Female Solo Artist	Herself	Nominated	
2026	British Dance Act	Herself	Nominated	

== British Fashion Awards ==
The Fashion Awards is a ceremony held annually in the United Kingdom since 1989 to showcase both British and international individuals and businesses who have made the most outstanding contributions to the fashion industry during the year.

Year	Category	Nominated work	Result	Ref.
2015	Fashion Innovator	Herself	Won	

== Glamour Awards ==
The Glamour Awards are presented annually by the Glamour magazine to women in a variety of fields.

Year	Category	Nominated work	Result	Ref.
2016	Cointreau British Solo Artist	Herself	Nominated	

== Golden Raspberry Awards ==
The Golden Raspberry Awards are awarded annually by the Golden Raspberry Foundation to honor the worst of cinematic failures.

Year	Category	Nominated work	Result	Ref.
2025	Worst Supporting Actress	The Crow	Nominated	

== Grammy Awards ==
The Grammy Awards are awarded annually by the National Academy of Recording Arts and Sciences of the United States to recognize outstanding achievement in the music industry.

Year	Category	Nominated work	Result	Ref.
2020	Best Music Video	"Cellophane"	Nominated	
2026	Best Dance/Electronic Album	Eusexua	Won	

Note: Jesse Kanda, the art director of LP1 was nominated for Best Recording Package at the 57th Annual Grammy Awards.

== Ivor Novello Awards ==
The Ivor Novello Awards are given by the Ivors Academy to recognize the best in songwriting and composing.

Year	Category	Nominated work	Result	Ref.
2015	Best Contemporary Song	"Two Weeks"	Nominated	
2022	Best Contemporary Song	"Don't Judge Me" (with Fred again.. and Headie One)	Nominated	

== IMPALA Awards ==
The Independent Music Companies Association (IMPALA), originally the Independent Music Publishers and Labels Association, is a non-profit trade association established in April 2000 to help European independent record labels represent their agenda and promote independent music. The European Independent Album of the Year Award winner is selected annually by a jury based on artistic merit alone from a nominated shortlist of albums released by a European independent label in the relevant year.

Year	Category	Nominated work	Result	Ref.
2015	European Independent Album of the Year	LP1	Nominated	

== Mercury Prize ==
The Mercury Prize, formerly the Mercury Music Prize, is an annual music prize awarded for the best album from the United Kingdom or Ireland.

Year	Category	Nominated work	Result	Ref.
2014	Best Album	LP1	Nominated	
2025	Best Album	Eusexua	Nominated	

== MTV European Music Awards ==
The MTV Europe Music Award (MTV EMA) is an award presented by Viacom International Media Networks to honour artists and music in pop culture. It was originally conceived as an alternative to the MTV Video Music Awards, which are hosted annually in the United States.

Year	Category	Nominated work	Result	Ref.
2019	Best Alternative	Herself	Won	
2020	Best Alternative	Herself	Nominated	

== MTV Video Music Awards ==
The MTV Video Music Awards were established in the end of the summer of 1984 by MTV to celebrate the top music videos of the year.

Year	Category	Nominated work	Result	Ref.
2015	Best New Artist	"Pendulum"	Nominated	
2015	Best Visual Effects	"Two Weeks"	Nominated	
2015	Best Cinematography	"Two Weeks"	Nominated	
2016	Best Visual Effects	"M3LL155X"	Nominated	
2016	Best Choreography	"M3LL155X"	Nominated	
2019	Best Choreography	"Cellophane"	Nominated	
2019	Best Visual Effects	"Cellophane"	Nominated	
2019	Best Direction	"Cellophane"	Nominated	
2022	Best Choreography	"Tears in the Club" (featuring The Weeknd)	Nominated	
2025	Best Choreography	"Eusexua"	Nominated	

== MTV Japan Video Music Awards ==
The MTV Video Music Awards Japan are the Japanese version of the MTV Video Music Awards. Like the MTV Video Music Awards in the United States, in this event artists are awarded for their songs and videos through online voting from the same channel viewers.

Year	Category	Nominated work	Result	Ref.
2015	Best New Artist International	Herself	Nominated	

== mtvU Woodie Awards ==
The mtvU, a division of MTV Networks owned by Viacom, broadcasts a 24-hour television channel available on more than 750 college and university campuses across the United States.

Year	Category	Nominated work	Result	Ref.
2015	Woodie Of The Year	Herself	Nominated	
2015	Best Video Woodie	"Pendulum"	Nominated	

== MOBO Awards ==
The Music of Black Origin Awards (MOBO), first presented in 1996, are held annually in the United Kingdom to recognise artists of any race or nationality who perform black music and "recognise the outstanding achievements of artists who perform music in genres ranging from Gospel, Jazz, RnB, Soul, Reggae to Hip Hop".

Year	Category	Nominated work	Result	Ref.
2015	Best Video	"Glass & Patron"	Nominated	
2015	Best Video	"Pendulum"	Won	
2015	Best Female Act	Herself	Nominated	
2022	Best Electronic/Dance Act	Herself	Nominated	
2026	Best Electronic Act	Herself	Nominated	
2026	Video of the Year	"Eusexua"	Nominated	

== Music Producers Guild Awards ==
Year	Category	Nominated work	Result	Ref.
2016	UK Single Song of the Year	"Pendulum"	Won	
2016	UK Album of the Year	LP1	Won	

== Music Week Awards ==
Year	Nominee / work	Award	Result	Ref.
2026	H&M's Spring 2025 Global Campaign	Music & Brand Partnership	Pending	

== NME Award ==
Year	Category	Nominated work	Result	Ref.
2015	Best New Artist	Herself	Nominated	
2015	Best Video	"Two Weeks"	Nominated	
2020	Best British Album	Magdalene	Nominated	
2020	Best Album in the World	Magdalene	Nominated	
2020	Best British Solo Act	Herself	Won	
2020	Best Solo Act in the World	Herself	Nominated	
2022	Best Mixtape	Caprisongs	Nominated	
2022	Best Collaboration	"Tears in the Club" (with The Weeknd)	Nominated	
2022	Godlike Genius Award	Herself	Won	

== Q Awards ==
Year	Category	Nominated work	Result	Ref.
2019	Best Track	"Cellophane"	Nominated	

== RTHK International Pop Poll Awards ==
Year	Category	Nominated work	Result	Ref.
2022	Top Female Artist	FKA Twigs	Nominated	
2022	Top Ten International Gold Songs	"Tears in the Club" (with The Weeknd)	Nominated	

== Raindance Film Festival ==
Year	Category	Nominated work	Result	Ref.
2021	Best Music Video	"Don't Judge Me" (with Fred again.. and Headie One) (video directed by Emmanuel Adjei and FKA twigs)	Won	

== UK Music Video Awards ==
Year	Category	Nominated work	Result	Ref.
2014	Best Alternative Video – Budget	"Papi Pacify"	Won	
2014	Best Alternative Video – Budget	"Tw-ache"	Nominated	
2014	Best Choreography in a Video	"Tw-ache"	Nominated	
2014	Best Choreography in a Video	"Wet Wipez"	Nominated	
2014	Best Video Artist	Herself	Won	
2015	Best Alternative Video - UK	"Pendulum"	Nominated	
2015	Best Styling in a Video	"Glass & Patron"	Nominated	
2015	Best Choreography in a Video	"Glass & Patron"	Nominated	
2015	Best Colour Grade in a Video	"M3LL155X"	Nominated	
2019	Best Artist	Herself	Won	
2019	Best Alternative Video - UK	"Cellophane"	Won	
2019	Best Choreography in a Video	"Cellophane"	Nominated	
2019	Best Cinematography in a Video	"Cellophane"	Won	
2019	Best Editing in a Video	"Cellophane"	Won	
2019	Best Visual Effects in a Video	"Cellophane"	Won	
2019	Best Styling in a Video	"Fukk Sleep" (with A$AP Rocky)	Nominated	
2020	Best Alternative Video - UK	"sad day"	Nominated	
2020	Best Cinematography in a Video	"sad day"	Won	
2020	Best Visual Effects in a Video	"sad day"	Nominated	
2020	Best R&B/Soul Video - UK	"holy terrain"	Nominated	
2021	Best Choreography in a Video	"Don't Judge Me" (with Headie One and Fred again..)	Nominated	
2022	Best R&B/Soul Video - UK	"jealousy"	Nominated	
2022	Best R&B/Soul Video - UK	"Tears in the Club" (featuring The Weeknd)	Nominated	
2022	Best Wardrobe Styling in a Video	"Tears in the Club" (featuring The Weeknd)	Nominated	
2022	Best Hair & Make-up in a Video	"Tears in the Club" (featuring The Weeknd)	Nominated	
2022	Best Editing in a Video	"Tears in the Club" (featuring The Weeknd)	Nominated	
2022	Best Choreography in a Video	"Tears in the Club" (featuring The Weeknd)	Nominated	
2022	Best Choreography in a Video	"ride the dragon"	Nominated	
2022	Best Special Video Project	Caprisongs	Nominated	
2025	Best Pop Video – UK	"Perfect Stranger"	Nominated	
2025	Best Pop Video – UK	"Eusexua"	Won	
2025	Best Performance in a Video	"Eusexua"	Nominated	
2025	Best Styling in a Video	"Eusexua"	Nominated	
2025	Best Cinematography in a Video	"Eusexua"	Nominated	
2025	Best Editing in a Video	"Eusexua"	Won	
2025	Best Choreography in a Video	"Eusexua"	Won	
2025	Best Choreography in a Video	"Childlike Things"	Nominated	
2025	Best Alternative Video – UK	"Striptease"	Won	

== Urban Music Awards ==
Year	Category	Nominated work	Result	Ref.
2015	Best Video	"Glass & Patron"	Nominated	
2015	Best Female Act	Herself	Nominated	

== YouTube Music Awards ==
Year	Category	Nominated work	Result	Ref.
2015	50 greatest artists and YouTube performances	Herself	Won	

== The Webby Awards ==
Year	Category	Nominated work	Result	Ref.
2016	Online Film & Video - Best Music Video	"Glass & Patron"	Nominated	
2018	Webby Special Achievement	Herself	Won	
2020	Best Music Video	"Cellophane"	Won	
2020	Best Individual Performance	Herself	Won	

== The South Bank Sky Arts Awards ==
Year	Category	Nominated work	Result	Ref.
2015	Best Pop Artist	Herself	Won	
