= M3LL155X =

EP by FKA Twigs
- Released: 13 August 2015
- Recorded: 2014
- Genres: Art pop; glitch; post-dubstep; UK bass
- Length: 18:44
- Label: Young Turks
- Producers: Boots; FKA Twigs; Tic

FKA Twigs chronology
LP1 (2014)	M3LL155X (2015)	Magdalene (2019)

Singles from M3LL155X
- 1. "In Time" Released: 31 August 2015

M3LL155X (pronounced "Melissa") is the third extended play (EP) by English singer and songwriter FKA Twigs, released on 13 August 2015 by Young Turks. The EP was lauded by music critics after its release and peaked at number 63 on the Billboard 200 becoming her second entry on the chart.

== Background ==
In November 2014, producer Boots, whose work includes producing music on Beyoncé's 2013 eponymous album, announced he was working on Twigs' third extended play.

M3LL155X was completed by November 2014, and she was waiting for the end of her LP1 tour before releasing any material. She had also been working on a music video for every song, which delayed the release.

When Twigs was 18, she began working with local London producers to try to find "her sound". Around the time is when she wrote "I'm Your Doll". She ended up producing a lot of what she calls "really bad demos." In an interview with Complex, Twigs admitted that she had a self-hatred while writing her debut studio album LP1, which she considers "quite normal" for a young person.

Before M3LL155X had a title, fans and reporters referred to the extended play as EP3, as a continuation of the pattern started by EP1 and EP2. In June 2015, she announced the name of the EP to be Melissa. "Melissa" is the name of Twigs's personal female energy. She explains that Melissa is not an alter ego, and clarifies that her female energy never had a name until the EP was being finalised. She named the extended play M3LL155X as a way of separating it from herself. It was this energy that made her want to appear pregnant in the "Glass & Patron" music video and the videos that follow.

== Release and promotion ==
The music video for "Glass & Patron", directed by Twigs herself, debuted on 23 March 2015 as part of the 2015 YouTube Music Awards. The song "Figure 8" premiered on Zane Lowe's radio show Beats 1 on 3 August 2015. The song "In Time" premiered on Annie Mac's radio show on BBC Radio 1 as well as on Sirius XMU an hour before the extended play's release. On 31 August 2015, "In Time" impacted contemporary hit radio in the United Kingdom as the lead single from the EP.

The extended play was released on 13 August 2015 as a digital download. Twigs unveiled the album artwork on her Instagram account. It was shot and edited by artist Matthew Stone.

=== M3LL155X short film ===
A short film was released simultaneously with the EP's release. The self-directed 16-minute video features four of the songs: "Figure 8", "I'm Your Doll", "In Time" and the previously released video for "Glass & Patron".

The video begins with the song "Figure 8", and features a cameo of fashion icon Michèle Lamy dressed as an anglerfish. Her hands and arms are entirely ornamented in jewelry. Near the end of the song, Lamy inserts the esca into her mouth. She opens her mouth to reveal a luminescent ball floating from her mouth. The song "I'm Your Doll" begins with a CGI animation of a nude woman inflating created by digital artist Jihoon Yoo. The video then cuts to a scene of Twigs, with the body of a blow-up doll, lying in a bed. A man lusts over her and proceeds to have sex with her plastic body. The doll body is deflated after he impregnated her. The song "In Time" begins and shows a pregnant Twigs, as well as a normal Twigs dancing for a man in a jewel (the man was previously featured in her video for "Papi Pacify" from EP2). As the song ends, Twigs's water breaks, and pastel paint drips down her legs and forms a puddle around her feet. A white van with pink and blue handprints flashes on the screen as the music video for "Glass & Patron" begins. A sample of "Mothercreep" begins as Twigs prepares to give birth to dancers and coloured mesh. The scene cuts to a vogue battle on a runway as "Glass & Patron" plays. Twigs begins as a judge of the battle but then participates near the end.

Billboard described the video as "jaw-dropping" and a "video statement". Rolling Stone compared the music video to the work of director David Lynch. The music video also received two nominations from 2016 MTV Video Music Awards for Best Visual Effects and Best Choreography.

== Critical reception ==
Professional ratings
Aggregate scores
Source	Rating
Metacritic	89/100
Review scores
Source	Rating
Billboard	4/5 stars
Consequence of Sound	B
DIY	4/5 stars
Drowned in Sound	9/10
The Independent	5/5 stars
Now Magazine	4/5 stars
Pitchfork	8.6/10
PopMatters	8/10
Spin	8/10

M3LL155X received widespread acclaim from contemporary music critics upon its release. At Metacritic, which assigns a normalized rating out of 100 to reviews from mainstream critics, the album received an average score of 89, based on 12 reviews, which indicates "universal acclaim". Kris Ex from Billboard described the extended play as "spacious, paranoid, and sultry," but stated that the songs lacked hooks. Ex commented that even though the EP makes a statement, it also leaves unanswered questions. Adam Kivel from Consequence of Sound compares the EP to the uncanny valley, stating that the music is similar to R&B and pop, but it still pulls the listener out of their comfort zone. Andy Gill from The Independent stated that the music is more focused and coherent than LP1. Gill also commented that Twigs's art is so unique, she's "staring stardom in the face." Anupa Mistry from Pitchfork stated that M3LL155X builds on Twigs's previous work, and her voice "prowls" over the music, compared to her previously soft voice. Mistry also declares Twigs to be the feminist pop star that we need. Harley Brown from Spin stated that Twigs seems to be "growing stronger," and described the sound of the extended play as "futuristic" and "nostalgic."

== Track listing ==
All tracks written and produced by FKA Twigs and Boots, except where noted.

M3LL155X track listing
No.	Title	Writer(s)	Producer(s)	Length
1.	"Figure 8"			3:03
2.	"I'm Your Doll"	FKA Twigs; Seiji; Tic		3:11
3.	"In Time"	FKA Twigs; Tic; Joel Compass	FKA Twigs; Tic	4:35
4.	"Glass & Patron"			4:19
5.	"Mothercreep"			3:36
Total length:				18:44

== Personnel ==
Credits adapted from the liner notes of M3LL155X.

- FKA Twigs – vocals, production, vocal arrangements, drums, programming, keyboards, synthesizer (all tracks)
- Jordan "Boots" Asher – production, vocal arrangements, percussion, drums, programming, keyboards, synthesizer (tracks 1, 2, 4, 5)
- Tic – production (tracks 3)
- Cy An – additional keyboards, drums, vocals, programming, edits (track 2)
- John Davis – mastering (all tracks)
- Happa – additional programming (track 3)
- Marco Pasquariello – additional engineering (track 3)
- Mark "Spike" Stent – mixing (track 3)
- Matthew Stone – photography
- Geoff Swan – additional mixing (track 3)
- David Wrench – mixing (tracks 2, 4); vocal mixing (track 3)
- Stuart Write – mixing (tracks 1, 5)

== Charts ==
Chart performance for M3LL155X
Chart (2015)	Peak position
Belgian Albums (Ultratop Flanders)	193
France (SNEP)	184
New Zealand Albums (RMNZ)	30
US Billboard 200	63
US Top Dance Albums (Billboard)	2
US Independent Albums (Billboard)	5

== Release history ==
Release history and formats for M3LL155X
Date	Format	Label	Ref.
13 August 2015	Digital download	Young Turks	
4 December 2015	EP	Young Turks	
