= Sad Day =

Sad Day may refer to:

- "Sad Day", a 1966 song by The Rolling Stones from "19th Nervous Breakdown"
- "Sad Day", a 2019 song by FKA Twigs from Magdalene
- "Sad Day", a song by Blancmange
