= Mood 4 Eva =

Promotional single by Beyoncé featuring Jay-Z, Childish Gambino & Oumou Sangaré

from the album The Lion King: The Gift
- Released: July 19, 2019
- Recorded: 2018–2019
- Studio: NRG Recording Studios
- Genre: Afrobeat; pop; hip hop
- Length: 4:32 (original version); 5:15 (extended version)
- Label: Parkwood; Columbia
- Songwriters: Denisia Andrews; Brittany Coney; Beyoncé; Shawn Carter; Donald Glover; Oumou Sangaré; Khaled Khaled; Floyd Nathaniel Hills; Michael Uzowuru; Teo Halm; Jeff Kleinman; Ant Clemons; Anathi Bhongo Mnyango
- Producers: Danja; Beyoncé; DJ Khaled; Michael Uzowuru; Teo Halm; Jeff Kleinman

Music video
- "Mood 4 Eva" on YouTube

"Mood 4 Eva" is a song recorded by American singer Beyoncé featuring Jay-Z, Childish Gambino & Oumou Sangaré, and was chosen as a promotional single for her 2019 curated soundtrack album The Lion King: The Gift.

== Background and composition ==
“Mood 4 Eva” was written by Knowles, Denisia Andrews, Brittany Coney, Shawn Carter, Donald Glover, Khaled Khaled, Floyd Nathaniel Hills, Michael Uzowuru, Teo Halm, Jeff Kleinman, Ant Clemons, and Anathi Bhongo Mnyango. The song also contains elements of "Diaraby Nene" written and performed by Oumou Sangaré, an interpolation of "Sweet Green Fields" written by Jimmy Seals, as well as an interpolation of "(Think) About It" written by James Brown.

Beyonce and Jay-Z lyrically pay homage to Yoruba deity Oshun, Queen of Sheba, Mansa Musa, Muhammad Ali, Nas, and The Notorious B.I.G., among others.

== Reception ==
On Rolling Stone's "List of the 70 Greatest Beyoncé Songs", "Mood 4 Eva" was described as the "standout of Black Is King". Ranked at #65 on the list, it was celebrated for being "effortlessly powerful, despite the smooth tempo." Hunter Harris of Vulture crowned the song as "near-perfect" and "the Best Song on Beyoncé’s New Lion King Album", noting that "Beyoncé chews us up, spits us out, and reminds us that if we need to recover, maybe the Ramada Inn has a vacancy?" Rap-Up described the song as a "triumphant [standout of the album]", while Eric Deggans of NPR Music echoed a similar sentiment.

== Visual ==
The visual was met with critical acclaim, lauded for its "colorful, lavish display[s] featuring designer looks, vibrant scenery, high-class jewels, and top-shelf champagne." Directed by Dikayl Rimmasch, cinematographer Santiago Gonzalez described the idea for the video as "portraying a carefree lifestyle with a dreamscape harkening back to old Hollywood... culminating in a Busby Berkeley-style aqua-musical fantasy" in an interview with Variety. Both Kelly Rowland and Tina Knowles-Lawson make cameo appearances.

The video was officially uploaded to YouTube on July 31, 2021, alongside "Otherside", to celebrate the first anniversary of the release of Black Is King.

== Personnel ==
- Beyoncé Giselle Knowles-Carter – producer, composer, lyricist, lead vocals, background vocals, vocal producer, performer
- Shawn Carter - composer, lyricist, vocals, performer
- Childish Gambino - composer, lyricist, vocals, performer
- Oumou Sangaré - composer, lyricist, vocals
- DJ Khaled - composer, producer
- Danja - composer, producer
- Michael Uzowuru - composer, additional producer
- Teo Halm - composer, additional producer
- Jeff Kleinman - composer, additional producer
- Stuart White – recording engineer, mixing engineer
- Riley Mackin - recording engineer
- John Cranfield - assistant engineer
- Jenna Felsenthal - assistant engineer
- Colin Leonard - mastering engineer

== Charts ==
Weekly chart performance for "Mood 4 Eva"
| Chart (2019) | Peak position |
|---|---|
| Australia (ARIA) | 48 |
| Canada Hot 100 (Billboard) | 64 |
| Ireland (IRMA) | 54 |
| UK Singles Chart (OCC) | 56 |
| US Hot 100 (Billboard) | 90 |
| US Hot R&B/Hip-Hop Songs (Billboard) | 33 |

== Release history ==
"Mood 4 Eva" release history
| Region | Date | Format(s) | Version | Label(s) | Ref. |
|---|---|---|---|---|---|
| Various | July 19, 2019 | Digital download; streaming | Original Version | Parkwood Entertainment; Columbia Records | |
| Various | July 19, 2019 | Streaming | Tidal Exclusive Extended Version | Parkwood Entertainment; Columbia Records | |
| Various | July 31, 2020 | Black Is King | Extended version | Parkwood; Columbia; Disney | |
