= Magdalene (album) =

2019 studio album by FKA Twigs

Studio album by FKA Twigs
- Released: 8 November 2019
- Recorded: 2016–2019
- Studios: Electric Lady (New York City); Private (Los Angeles and United Kingdom); Sound Factory (Los Angeles); XL (New York City) (Note: Except "Holy Terrain", recorded at Henson and Conway in Los Angeles)
- Genres: Art pop; electronic
- Length: 38:48
- Label: Young Turks
- Producers: Benny Blanco; Daniel Lopatin; FKA Twigs; Jack Antonoff; Jeff Kleinman; Koreless; Michael Uzowuru; Nicolas Jaar; Noah Goldstein; Skrillex

FKA Twigs chronology
M3LL155X (2015)	Magdalene (2019)	Caprisongs (2022)

Singles from Magdalene
- 1. "Cellophane" Released: 24 April 2019; 2. "Holy Terrain" Released: 9 September 2019; 3. "Home with You" Released: 7 October 2019; 4. "Sad Day" Released: 4 November 2019

Magdalene (stylised in all caps) is the second studio album by English singer-songwriter FKA Twigs. Released on 8 November 2019, by Young Turks, it is her first project since her EP M3LL155X (2015), and first full-length record since LP1 (2014). The album features a sole guest appearance from American rapper Future. FKA Twigs produced the album herself, with a wide range of co-producers including Nicolas Jaar, Koreless, Daniel Lopatin, Skrillex, Benny Blanco, Michael Uzowuru and Noah Goldstein, who also served as executive producer alongside Twigs.

The singles "Cellophane", "Holy Terrain", "Home with You", and "Sad Day" were released on 24 April, 9 September, 7 October, and 4 November, respectively. The album was supported by the Magdalene Tour.

== Background ==
On 9 September 2019, FKA Twigs announced that her second studio album Magdalene would be released on 25 October; the album preorder and track listing were made available the same day. The album cover was designed by English artist Matthew Stone.

Barnett wrote in a press release announcing her second studio album:

I never thought heartbreak could be so all-encompassing. I never thought that my body could stop working to the point that I couldn't express myself physically in the ways that I have always loved and found so much solace. I have always practiced my way into being the best I could be, but I couldn't do that this time, I was left with no option but to tear every process down. But the process of making this album has allowed me for the first time, and in the most real way, to find compassion when I have been at my most ungraceful, confused and fractured. I stopped judging myself and at that moment found hope in Magdalene. To her I am forever grateful.

The album was inspired by her 2017 breakup with actor Robert Pattinson.

== Musical style ==
On Magdalene, Twigs crafts electronic art pop, fusing it with "lurid" modern dance and "carnal" soul music. However, it is also described as "[defying] both genre and classification". This embrace of "adventurous" experimentation echoes musicians like Björk and Kate Bush. It features elements of pop, avant-garde, R&B, trap, hip hop, trip hop, alt-pop, punk rock, industrial, opera, chamber pop, and Bulgarian folk.

== Promotion ==
=== Singles ===
The lead single "Cellophane" was released on 24 April 2019. The second single "Holy Terrain" featuring American rapper Future was released on 9 September. "Home with You" was released on 7 October after the album's release date was pushed from 25 October to 8 November. "Sad Day" was released on 4 November.

=== Tour ===
For the Magdalene album tour, FKA Twigs learned pole dancing and wushu.

== Critical reception ==
Professional ratings
Aggregate scores
Source	Rating
AnyDecentMusic?	8.5/10
Metacritic	88/100
Review scores
Source	Rating
AllMusic	4.5/5 stars
The Daily Telegraph	5/5 stars
The Guardian	3/5 stars
The Independent	4/5 stars
NME	5/5 stars
The Observer	4/5 stars
Pitchfork	9.4/10
Q	4/5 stars
Rolling Stone	4/5 stars
The Times	4/5 stars

Magdalene was met with widespread critical acclaim. At Metacritic, which assigns a normalised rating out of 100 to reviews from mainstream publications, the album received an average score of 88, based on 28 reviews. Aggregator AnyDecentMusic? gave it 8.5 out of 10, based on their assessment of the critical consensus.

Heather Phares of AllMusic gave a positive review, stating "At once more delicate and more concentrated than any of her previous work, Magdalene is a testament to the strength and skill it takes to make music this fragile and revealing. Like the dancer she is, Barnett pushes through pain in pursuit of beauty and truth, and the leaps she makes are breathtaking". Alexandra Pollard of The Independent said, "The follow-up to 2014's LP1 is the sound of a woman teetering on the brink of collapse, gathering herself, and then erupting into a kind of defiance". Magdalene was named "Album of the Week" by The Line of Best Fit, and reviewer Jack Bray called it the "fullest and most developed work from FKA Twigs to date", writing that Barnett "comprehensively opens herself up to consider the traumas of her past. It is an unsparing, anguished release in which we see an artist laid bare and tapping into a more natural and resonant version of her sound and self". Reviewing the album for NME, El Hunt stated: "Tahliah Barnett's been to tabloid hell and back and experienced gruelling ill-health, all of which is explored on her huge, panoramic second album." The Daily Telegraph's Neil McCormick wrote, "Magdalene is a magnificently twisted sci-fi torch album, an enthralling account of love, loss, heartbreak and recovery. It is erotic and neurotic, confounding and revelatory, summoning the spirits of such iconoclastic talents as David Bowie, Kate Bush and Björk while affirming its own unique personality". Exclaim! critic Ryan B. Patrick said, "The intent, execution and expression is pure. But the ominous feel of the entire project overwhelms, in parts, with a forlorn sense of distance and dread – which appears to be the point – yet its subsuming sense of femininity, sexuality, free will and determinism paradoxically draws us in".

Josh Gray from Clash enjoyed the album, saying, "Almost every track on Magdalene is built upwards from a simple piano line, hammering home the impression of someone delicately yet decisively knitting themselves back together after coming undone". Emily Mackay of The Observer saying "Magdalene is a much starker, more emotionally direct album than 2014's LP1, most noticeably in twigs's voice, which moves with sleek power from delicate operatic acrobatics to muscular intimacy. It's also bracingly frank". Pitchfork awarded Magdalene the distinction of "Best New Music", with Julianne Escobedo Shepherd describing it as "her best album so far", saying that it "is as introspective as anything she's written, but more obviously centers her voice as a conduit for plain emotion". In a mixed review, The Guardian's Alexis Petridis stated: "Sometimes the results are stunning ... Sometimes, however, the songs are weirdly stifling."

=== Year-end lists ===
Select year-end rankings of Magdalene
Publication	List	Rank	Ref.
The A.V. Club	The 20 Best Albums of 2019	1	
Billboard	50 Best Albums of 2019	19	
Complex	Best Albums of 2019	39	
The Guardian	The 50 Best Albums of 2019	7	
The Independent	The 50 Best Albums of 2019	31	
NME	The 50 Best Albums of 2019	6	
Pitchfork	The 50 Best Albums of 2019	2	
Rolling Stone	50 Best Albums of 2019	36	
Spin	10 Best Albums of 2019	5	
Time	The 10 Best Albums of 2019	1	

== Track listing ==
Magdalene track listing
No.	Title	Writer(s)	Producer(s)	Length
1.	"Thousand Eyes"	FKA Twigs; Nicolas Jaar	Jaar	5:00
2.	"Home with You"	Twigs; Ethan P. Flynn	Twigs; Jaar^{[a]}^{[b]}; Noah Goldstein^{[b]}	3:44
3.	"Sad Day"	Twigs; Lewis Roberts; Benny Blanco; Magnus Høiberg; Jaar; Skrillex; Goldstein	Twigs; Blanco; Jaar; Skrillex; Koreless^{[a]}; Cashmere Cat^{[a]}; Goldstein^{[a]}	4:15
4.	"Holy Terrain" (featuring Future)	Twigs; Nayvadius Wilburn; Roberts; Jack Antonoff; Sounwave; Skrillex; Jason Boyd; Petar Lyondev	Twigs; Antonoff; Skrillex; Sounwave^{[a]}; Koreless^{[a]}; Kenny Beats^{[a]}	4:03
5.	"Mary Magdalene"	Twigs; Blanco; Jaar; Høiberg	Twigs; Blanco; Jaar; Koreless^{[a]}; Cashmere Cat^{[a]}; Goldstein^{[a]}	5:21
6.	"Fallen Alien"	Twigs; Flynn; Cy An; Jaar; Arthur Timothy Jones; Milton Ray Biggham	Twigs; Jaar	3:58
7.	"Mirrored Heart"	Twigs; Flynn; Cy An; Roberts	Twigs; Koreless	4:32
8.	"Daybed"	Twigs; Daniel Lopatin	Lopatin	4:31
9.	"Cellophane"	Twigs; Jeff Kleinman; Michael Uzowuru	Twigs; Kleinman; Uzowuru	3:24
Total length:				38:48

Japanese bonus track
No.	Title	Length
10.	"Cellophane" (live at the Wallace Collection)	3:56
Total length:		42:44

Notes

- ^{^[a]} signifies an additional producer
- ^{^[b]} signifies a vocal producer
- All tracks are stylized in lower case.

Samples

- "Holy Terrain" contains a sample from "Moma Hubava", composed by Petar Lyondev, performed by Le Mystère des Voix Bulgares, conducted by Prof. Dora Hristova and recorded by KEXP.
- "Fallen Alien" contains a sample from "Storm Clouds Rising" by the Florida Mass Choir.

== Personnel ==
Credits are adapted from the album's liner notes.

Musicians

- FKA Twigs – vocals, Tempest (1, 3), drums (5, 7, 8), voice synth (5), additional programming (8)
- Nicolas Jaar – programming (2, 6, 9), synths (3), drums (3, 5–7), piano (5), additional percussion (9)
- Ethan P. Flynn – piano (2, 6), clarinet (2, 6), keyboards (2, 7)
- Cy An – keyboards (2), programming (2, 6), drums (2, 6), guitar (6, 7), percussion loop (6)
- Noah Goldstein – programming (2), drums (2, 3, 5)
- Koreless – synths (3, 7), synth strings (3), keyboards (4), programming (4), drums (5)
- Benny Blanco – synths (3), drums (3, 5)
- Hudson Mohawke – drums (3)
- Skrillex – drums (3, 4), programming (4)
- Future – vocals (4)
- Jack Antonoff – keyboards (4), drums (4), programming (4)
- Sounwave – drums (4), programming (4)
- Arca – vocal processing (4), synth programming (4)
- Andrés Osorio – guitar (5)
- Rick Nowels – synths (7)
- Motion Graphics – additional programming (8), woodwind programming (8), samples (8)
- Alex Epton – drums (8)
- Jeff Kleinman – piano (9), synths (9)
- Michael Uzowuru – drums (9), vocal percussion (9)
- Rob Moose – strings (9)

Technical

- Michael Peterson – engineering
- Noah Goldstein – engineering (2, 3, 5, 9)
- Lee Avant – engineering
- Dean Reid – engineering
- Rick Nowels – engineering
- Alex Epton – engineering
- John Foyle – engineering, vocal recording (8)
- Laura Sisk – engineering (4)
- Jon Sher – assistant engineering (4)
- Tate McDowell – assistant engineering (4)
- Chris Wang – additional engineering (8)
- Manny Marroquin – mixing (1–3, 5–9)
- Nicolas Jaar – mixing (1)
- Skrillex – mixing (4)
- Chris Galland – mix engineering (1–3, 5–9)
- Robin Florent – mix assistance (1–3, 5–9)
- Scott Desmarais – mix assistance (1–3, 5–9)
- Joe LaPorta – mastering

Artwork

- Matthew Stone – artwork
- Matthew Josephs – creative direction
- Brodie Kaman – design

== Charts ==
2019 chart performance for Magdalene
Chart (2019)	Peak position
Australian Albums (ARIA)	22
Austrian Albums (Ö3 Austria)	56
Belgian Albums (Ultratop Flanders)	23
Belgian Albums (Ultratop Wallonia)	76
Canadian Albums (Billboard)	57
Dutch Albums (Album Top 100)	55
French Albums (SNEP)	113
German Albums (Offizielle Top 100)	78
Irish Albums (IRMA)	39
Italian Albums (FIMI)	76
Japanese Albums (Oricon)	118
Lithuanian Albums (AGATA)	19
New Zealand Albums (RMNZ)	27
Portuguese Albums (AFP)	8
Scottish Albums (Official Charts)	28
Swiss Albums (Schweizer Hitparade)	60
UK Albums (Official Charts)	21
US Billboard 200	54
US Top Dance Albums (Billboard)	1

2025 chart performance for Magdalene
Chart (2025)	Peak position
Croatian International Albums (HDU)	16

== Release history ==
Release dates and formats for Magdalene
Country	Date	Label	Format	Ref.
Various	8 November 2019	Young Turks	CD; digital download; LP; streaming	

== See also ==
- List of 2019 albums
- List of Billboard number-one electronic albums of 2019
