= List of Billboard number-one electronic albums of 2019 =

These are the albums that reached number one on the Billboard Dance/Electronic Albums chart in 2019.

== Chart history ==
Key
†	Indicates best-performing album of 2019

Issue date	Album	Artist	Reference
January 5	Sick Boy	The Chainsmokers	
January 12	Sick Boy	The Chainsmokers	
January 19	Sick Boy	The Chainsmokers	
January 26	Sick Boy	The Chainsmokers	
February 2	Assume Form	James Blake	
February 9	Sick Boy	The Chainsmokers	
February 16	Fortnite Extended Set †	Marshmello	
February 23	Fortnite Extended Set †	Marshmello	
March 2	Fortnite Extended Set †	Marshmello	
March 9	Fortnite Extended Set †	Marshmello	
March 16	Fortnite Extended Set †	Marshmello	
March 23	Fortnite Extended Set †	Marshmello	
March 30	Fortnite Extended Set †	Marshmello	
April 6	Fortnite Extended Set †	Marshmello	
April 13	Fortnite Extended Set †	Marshmello	
April 20	Fortnite Extended Set †	Marshmello	
April 27	Fortnite Extended Set †	Marshmello	
May 4	Fortnite Extended Set †	Marshmello	
May 11	Fortnite Extended Set †	Marshmello	
May 18	Fortnite Extended Set †	Marshmello	
May 25	Fortnite Extended Set †	Marshmello	
June 1	Fortnite Extended Set †	Marshmello	
June 8	Flamagra	Flying Lotus	
June 15	World War Joy (EP)	The Chainsmokers	
June 22	Tim	Avicii	
June 22	Tim	Avicii	
July 6	Tim	Avicii	
July 13	World War Joy (EP)	The Chainsmokers	
July 20	Joytime III	Marshmello	
July 27	World War Joy (EP)	The Chainsmokers	
August 3	Anima	Thom Yorke	
August 10	Carte Blanche	DJ Snake	
August 17	World War Joy (EP)	The Chainsmokers	
August 24	Carte Blanche	DJ Snake	
August 31	Ascend	Illenium	
September 7	Ascend	Illenium	
September 14	Ascend	Illenium	
September 21	Artemis	Lindsey Stirling	
September 28	Ascend	Illenium	
October 5	Ascend	Illenium	
October 12	Ascend	Illenium	
October 19	Ascend	Illenium	
October 26	Fortnite Extended Set †	Marshmello	
November 2	Ascend	Illenium	
November 9	Gravity	Gryffin	
November 16	Fortnite Extended Set †	Marshmello	
November 23	Magdalene	FKA Twigs	
November 30	Good Faith	Madeon	
December 7	Fortnite Extended Set †	Marshmello	
December 14	Fortnite Extended Set †	Marshmello	
December 21	World War Joy	The Chainsmokers	
December 28	Bubba	Kaytranada	
