= Jeff Kleinman =

American record producer

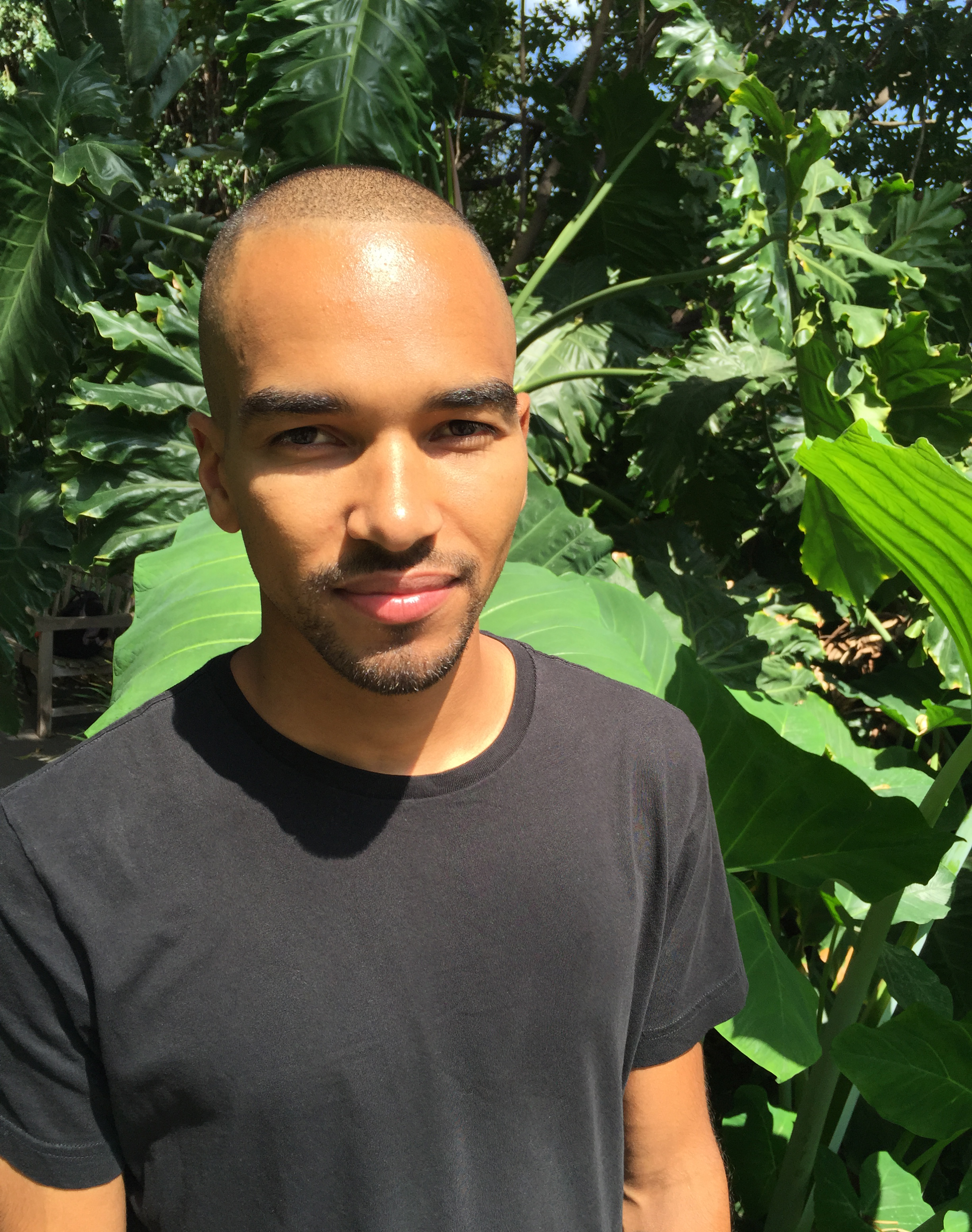

Background information
- Also known as: BLACK MONDAY
- Origin: Los Angeles, California, United States
- Occupations: Record producer; composer; songwriter; musician
- Years active: 2012–present

Jeffrey Kleinman (born September 23, 1988) is an American record producer. He has produced for artists such as Beyoncé, Frank Ocean, FKA Twigs, Kevin Abstract, Anderson .Paak and Baby Keem. His music is featured in Charles Ferguson's documentary film Time To Choose (2016).

== Writing/Production discography ==
Year	Artist	Album	Song
2012	Tyga	Careless World: Rise of the Last King	"I'm Gone"
2015	Cathedrals	Blush EP	"Want My Love (TastyTreat x BLACK MONDAY Remix)"
2016	BROCKHAMPTON	All-American Trash	
2016	BROCKHAMPTON	All-American Trash	"Michigan"
2016	BROCKHAMPTON	All-American Trash	"Breakfast"
2016	Kevin Abstract	American Boyfriend	"Empty"
2016	Kevin Abstract	American Boyfriend	"Seventeen"
2016	Kevin Abstract	American Boyfriend	"Blink"
2016	Kevin Abstract	American Boyfriend	"Tattoo"
2016	Kevin Abstract	American Boyfriend	"Yellow"
2016	Kevin Abstract	American Boyfriend	"Kin"
2016	Kevin Abstract	American Boyfriend	"Runner"
2016	Kevin Abstract	American Boyfriend	"Papercut"
2016	Kevin Abstract	American Boyfriend	"June 29th"
2016	Kevin Abstract	American Boyfriend	"Miserable America"
2016	Kevin Abstract	American Boyfriend	"Echo"
2017	Little Dragon	Single	"High (Michael Uzowuru & Jeff Kleinman Remix)"
2017	Frank Ocean	Single	"Chanel"
2017	Rex Orange County	Apricot Princess	"Waiting Room"
2018	Anderson .Paak	Single	"'Til It's Over"
2018	Jorja Smith	Lost & Found	"February 3rd"
2018	Choker	Honeybloom	"Drift"
2018	Choker	Honeybloom	"Starfruit LA"
2018	Choker	Honeybloom	"Starfruit NYC"
2018	Choker	Honeybloom	"Jet Stereo"
2018	Choker	Honeybloom	"Windbreaker"
2018	Choker	Honeybloom	"Rocket"
2018	Choker	Honeybloom	"Suzuki Peaches"
2018	Choker	Honeybloom	"Fuji Unlimited"
2018	Choker	Honeybloom	"Gusher"
2018	Choker	Honeybloom	"Baby Boy"
2018	Choker	Honeybloom	"Arboretum"
2018	Choker	Honeybloom	"Daisy"
2018	Ludwig Göransson	Black Panther: Wakanda Remixed	"Ancestral Plane (Uzowuru and Kleinman Remix)"
2018	Troye Sivan	Bloom	"Running Shoes"
2018	Kelsey Lu	Blood	"Due West"
2019	FKA Twigs	Magdalene	"Cellophane"
2019	Beyoncé, Jay-Z and Childish Gambino featuring Oumou Sangaré	The Lion King: The Gift	"Mood 4 Eva"
2019	SiR (featuring Kendrick Lamar)	Chasing Summer	"Hair Down"
2020	IDK	IDK & FRIENDS 2	"SQUARE UP (Ft. Juicy J)"
2020	Bea Miller	Elated!	"self crucify"
2021	J Balvin	Jose	"Qué Más Pues?"
2021	Baby Keem	The Melodic Blue	"16"
2022	FKA Twigs	Caprisongs	"Ride The Dragon"
2025	Cardi B Featuring Dougie F.	Am I the Drama?	"Man Of Your Word"

== Music for film/television ==
Year	Film	Song/Credit
2015	The Kennedy Files	Main Theme
2016	Time To Choose	
2016	Time To Choose	"The Price"
2016	Time To Choose	"Info Theme"
2016	Time To Choose	"Coal"
2016	Time To Choose	"The Choice"
2018	Welcome Home (Apple)	"'Til It's Over"
2018	5 Reasons iPad Pro can be your next computer — Apple	"Light The Torch"
2019	Guava Island	Additional Composition
