= Cellophane (FKA Twigs song) =

2019 single by FKA Twigs

Single by FKA Twigs

from the album Magdalene
- Released: 24 April 2019
- Genre: Avant-pop; art pop; chamber pop
- Length: 3:24
- Label: Young
- Songwriters: FKA Twigs; Jeff Kleinman; Michael Uzowuru
- Producers: FKA Twigs; Kleinman; Uzowuru

FKA Twigs singles chronology
"Fukk Sleep" (2018)	"Cellophane" (2019)	"Holy Terrain" (2019)

Music video
- "Cellophane" on YouTube

"Cellophane" is a song by English singer FKA Twigs and the lead single from her second studio album, Magdalene (2019). It was released on 24 April 2019 through the record label Young. Its music video was also released on 24 April. "Cellophane" was met with widespread critical acclaim, with Twigs' vocal performance drawing significant praise.

== Background and recording ==
After the release of her debut album LP1 in 2014, FKA Twigs (real name Tahliah Debrett Barnett) began dating and eventually became engaged to the English actor Robert Pattinson. Their relationship faced significant internet and tabloid attention, and Twigs became subject to racist abuse and hostility from some fans of The Twilight Saga, in which Pattinson played one of the main characters (Edward Cullen), who hoped the actor would rekindle his relationship with his Twilight co-star Kristen Stewart. It was reported by The Sun in October 2017 that the two had ended their engagement. Several publications consider or speculate that "Cellophane"'s subject matter was inspired by this relationship.

In an interview with Double J in June 2019, Twigs revealed that she had begun writing "Cellophane" a little over a year from then, although "the feeling for the song maybe started a year before that," during a period of isolation away from friends and family in Los Angeles. She developed an interest in medieval-inspired Gunne Sax dresses from the 1970s, purchasing a large number of them, and consequently would spend a significant amount of time "just wandering around in these medieval dresses." During this period, she began recording a number of songs for an album, including "Cellophane".

== Composition and lyrics ==
"Cellophane" was written and produced by Twigs alongside Jeff Kleinman and Michael Uzowuru. It is set in common time with a tempo of 107 beats per minute and is composed in the key of D Major, with Twigs' vocals spanning a range of F#_{3} to F#_{5}. The song has been characterised by critics as an avant-pop and art pop piano ballad with additional strings, synths and a minimal beatboxed rhythm. However, at the 1:40 or 2:34 mark "the piano stops and this visceral, electric, metallic-y reverb throws the entire track into free fall before the drum swoops in to lock the tempo back down," as noted by Danielle Cohen of GQ. The A.V. Club's Randall Colburn considered the song to be "all about texture, with round, rippling beats underscoring sharp, shadowy loops and Twigs' crystalline vocals."

The song's lyrics focus on a breakup, where Twigs sings of her unrequited love, desperately trying to salvage her relationship despite public disapproval and the lack of reciprocation from her lover. "Cellophane" has been noted for Twigs' breathy soprano and falsetto vocals, and the singer's technique ranges from "breathy devastation to high notes of carefully controlled keening." Sasha Geffen of Vulture wrote that the singer's voice "cracks and groans and breaks, as if it's dragging more weight than it can bear." Other publications have highlighted how the song's sparse background serves to bring her vocals to its forefront.

== Promotion ==
Twigs mailed out physical copies of the artwork to various fans with a handwritten note that read: "You are one of my more loyal supporters, so I wanted to write to you directly to let you know — it's time. FKA twigs." Tower Records in Shinjuku, Japan tweeted that they would be distributing copies of the artwork that was mailed to fans from 26 April.

The music video was available as a countdown for several hours on 23 April before being taken down; the information in the description listed its director as Andrew Thomas Huang and production company as Object & Animal. Twigs later formally announced its release for 24 April.

== Critical reception ==
"Cellophane" received widespread acclaim from music critics upon its release, with many directing their praise at Twigs' vocal performance. Pitchfork awarded it Best New Track upon its release and named it the best song of 2019, with writer Michelle Kim praising its minimalist and stripped-back production for bringing Twigs' "delicate" and "impossibly moving" voice to the forefront. Raisa Bruner of Time called it a "softly unsettling, devastating tune," while The Guardian's Sam Wolfson described it as "vulnerable, honest and apparently not flogging anything." In his review for NME, Tom Connick dubbed it "a raw-as-you-like taste of FKA Twigs' singular talent"; he also noted the lack of studio manipulation of Twigs' vocals found in her earlier work, which he considered refreshing. Danielle Cohen, writing for GQ, applauded the unpredictability of the track, stating that "when you think you get the gist of its sound, it morphs into something totally new." She further praised its ability to turn its lyrical theme of vulnerability "into something dynamic and textured, not to mention simply stunning."

The 405 named "Cellophane" the day's best track, with Rob Hakimian expressing both surprise and approval at the lack of "erratic beats and bass that has characterised her work thus far" in favour of a "skeletal piano ballad," allowing Twigs to "show off her stunning vocal abilities." Sasha Geffen of Vulture said that "if she sounded aloof on previous records, she sheds that protective layer here," summarising that "this is Twigs at her slowest, most serene, and most painful." Consequence of Sound's Brad Dountz opined that "so much emotional weight haunts every chord of FKA twigs' return single," adding that the singer "shines brightly when she transforms her past into a sharp and self-aware marvel." Philip Cosores of Uproxx praised Twigs' songwriting and singing ability on display on the track, writing that "the dramatic piano-driven piece is as vulnerable as it gets, with her voice quivering with emotional outpouring as the song expands into technicolor."

=== Year-end lists ===
Year-end lists for "Cellophane"
Publication	List	Rank	Ref.
Billboard	The Best Songs of 2019	32	
NME	The 50 Best Songs of 2019	21	
The Guardian	The 20 Best Songs of 2019	6	
Pitchfork	The 100 Best Songs of 2019	1	

=== Awards and nominations ===
Year	Organization	Award	Result	Ref.
2019	MTV Video Music Awards	Best Direction	Nominated	
2019	MTV Video Music Awards	Best Visual Effects	Nominated	
2019	MTV Video Music Awards	Best Choreography	Nominated	
2019	UK Music Video Awards	Best Alternative Video - UK	Won	
2019	UK Music Video Awards	Best Choreography in a Video	Nominated	
2019	UK Music Video Awards	Best Cinematography in a Video	Won	
2019	UK Music Video Awards	Best Editing in a Video	Won	
2019	UK Music Video Awards	Best Visual Effects in a Video	Won	
2020	Grammy Awards	Best Music Video	Nominated	

== Music video ==
The music video was directed by Andrew Thomas Huang and was released on 24 April 2019 via her YouTube channel. It depicts Twigs pole dancing in front of an unseen audience, climbing the pole to meet a large flying creature which wears her face, falling into an "underworld", and then being covered in clay by two female creatures. Huang described the video as "imagery of her ascending and then falling through an image of herself." It was named the best music video of 2019 by Pitchfork.

In May 2018, Twigs disclosed in an Instagram post that she had undergone laparoscopic surgery to have six fibroid tumours removed from her uterus. She described them as "a fruit bowl of pain every day", revealing that her nurse "said that the weight and size was like being six months pregnant". This was accompanied with a video of her practicing pole dancing; she wrote that her "confidence as a woman was knocked" and wondered if her body "would ever feel the same again", but while practicing her dancing at the time of the post, she "felt like [her] strong self again for the first time in a while and it was magical." Until the single's release, she posted more videos displaying her progress in pole dancing in between clips of martial arts training.

In a statement accompanying the release of the "Cellophane", Twigs revealed that she expressly learned to pole dance over a year before the music video was shot in order to realise her vision for it.

== In popular culture ==
In October 2022, a clip from Will Orrick uploaded to YouTube shared audio from a user named "Boyfrienddick" impersonating Miss Piggy from the Muppets singing the first lines of the song in the order to serenade Kermit. The lines were changed from "Didn't I do it for you" to "Let me do it for you" and the last line is replaced with "Kermie".

The audio went viral on TikTok and YouTube after the clip was mixed with the instrumental in January 2023 with visuals of a Borzoi dog.

== Personnel ==
- FKA Twigs – vocals
- Jeff Kleinman – piano, synths
- Michael Uzowuru – drums, vocal percussion
- Rob Moose – strings
- Nicolas Jaar – additional percussion, programming
- Noah Goldstein – engineering
- Manny Marroquin – mixing

== Charts ==
Chart performance for "Cellophane"
Chart (2019)	Peak position
New Zealand Hot Singles (RMNZ)	30
UK Indie (Official Charts)	46

== Release history ==
Region	Date	Format	Label	Ref.
Various	24 April 2019	Digital download	Young	
