= Two Weeks (FKA Twigs song) =

Single by FKA twigs

from the album LP1
- B-side: "Pendulum"
- Released: 24 June 2014
- Recorded: 2014
- Genre: R&B
- Length: 4:08
- Label: Young Turks
- Songwriters: FKA Twigs; Emile Haynie
- Producers: Emile Haynie; FKA Twigs

FKA twigs singles chronology
"FKA x inc." (2014)	"Two Weeks" (2014)	"Pendulum" (2014)

Music video
- "Two Weeks" on YouTube

"Two Weeks" is a song by English singer FKA Twigs from her debut studio album, LP1 (2014). The song was released digitally on 24 June 2014 as the album's lead single. It was also released on 12-inch vinyl on 29 July 2014, featuring the song "Pendulum" as a B-side.

== Critical reception ==
"Two Weeks" was met with acclaim from music critics. The song was chosen upon release as Pitchfork's "Best New Track". Patric Fallon described it as "a beguilingly straight-laced cut of silken R&B" and "a commanding blast of raw sexual power." He also stated, "FKA twigs is larger than life here, knocking on the doors of great contemporary pop singers—Ciara, Mariah, and even Aaliyah, to name a few—with her breathy falsetto and magnetic presence." Pitchfork later placed it at number three on its 100 Best Tracks of 2014 list and at number 64 on its 200 Best Tracks of the Decade So Far list. In January 2015, "Two Weeks" was ranked at number two on The Village Voice's annual year-end Pazz & Jop critics' poll, after Future Islands' "Seasons (Waiting on You)".

"Two Weeks" was also included in the book "1001 Songs You Must Hear Before You Die".

== Music video ==
FKA Twigs' appearance in the video has been compared to that of Aaliyah's character Akasha in the 2002 film Queen of the Damned.

The music video was directed by Nabil Elderkin and premiered on 24 June 2014. In the video, FKA Twigs portrays a giant goddess surrounded by miniature dancers, also played by Twigs. The entire video consists of one long dolly-out shot. The video was nominated for Best Visual Effects and Best Cinematography at the 2015 MTV Video Music Awards. It remains her most viewed video on YouTube, standing at 39 million views as of September 2026.

== In popular culture ==
The song has been featured in the USA Network series Mr. Robot, the CW series The Originals, the Starz series Hightown and Power, and the Apple TV+ series Dark Matter. It serves as the opening theme of the second season of the Brazilian telenovela Hidden Truths.

It was also featured in a Burberry men's fragrance commercial with Adam Driver.

It was covered by #1 Dads featuring Tom Snowdon and Ainslie Wills in a 2015 Triple J Like A Version performance.

== Track listings ==
- Digital download
1. "Two Weeks" – 4:08
- Limited edition 12-inch single

A. "Two Weeks" – 4:08
B. "Pendulum" – 4:59

== Credits and personnel ==
Credits adapted from the liner notes of LP1.

- FKA Twigs – vocals, additional production, Tempest
- Arca – additional programming, synth
- John Davis – mastering
- Emile Haynie – drums, instruments, production, recording
- Joseph Hartwell Jones – vocal recording
- David Wrench – mixing

== Charts ==
Chart (2014–2015)	Peak position
Belgium (Ultratip Bubbling Under Flanders)	54
UK Singles (OCC)	200
UK Indie (Official Charts)	9
US Dance/Electronic Digital Songs (Billboard)	42

== Certifications ==
Certifications and sales for Two Weeks
Region	Certification	Certified units/sales
United Kingdom (BPI)	Silver	200,000^{‡}
United States (RIAA)	Gold	500,000^{‡}
^{‡} Sales+streaming figures based on certification alone.

== Release history ==
Region	Date	Format	Label	Ref.
United Kingdom	24 June 2014	Digital download	Young Turks	
United Kingdom	29 July 2014	12-inch single	Young Turks	
