= Pendulum (song) =

2014 song by FKA Twigs

Single by FKA Twigs

from the album LP1
- A-side: "Two Weeks"
- Released: 29 July 2014
- Recorded: 2014
- Length: 4:58
- Label: Young Turks
- Songwriter(s): FKA Twigs; Paul Epworth
- Producer(s): Paul Epworth; FKA Twigs

FKA Twigs singles chronology
"Two Weeks" (2014)	"Pendulum" (2014)	"Video Girl" (2014)

Music video
- "Pendulum" on YouTube

"Pendulum" is a song by English singer FKA Twigs from her debut studio album, LP1 (2014). The song was released digitally on 30 July 2014 as the album's second single. It was also released on 12-inch vinyl the day before, serving as the B-side to "Two Weeks". "Pendulum" premiered on Zane Lowe's BBC Radio 1 show on 29 July 2014. Upon its premiere, Twigs referred to the track as "one of my favourite songs on my record."

== Critical reception ==
Upon its release, "Pendulum" received acclaim from music critics, who noted its complex production and Twigs's vocals. Patric Fallon of Pitchfork selected it as "Best New Track", writing that "[n]ot since last year's bewitching 'Water Me' [...] has the London singer released a single as dedicated to nuance and will-o'-the-wisp sublimity as [...] 'Pendulum'." However, Fallon also noted the differences between the two tracks, stating: "Where 'Water Me' and 'Pendulum' diverge in their style and substance is in the latter's resounding chorus and bridge, when the music's detached and capricious elements finally converge into a hook that plays like a hymn to the patron saint of melancholic desire."

Brenna Ehrlich of MTV News called the track "a spare kind of thing hung with pattering drums—laid over a deeper, thrumming heartbeat—and laced with her ethereal, overlapping vocals." Chris Coplan of Consequence of Sound was also laudatory, commenting: "Even as the somewhat jarring sounds threaten to consume every drop of your attention, it's damn near impossible to avoid the emotional spell Twigs weaves with each and every revelatory note."

== Music video ==
The music video for "Pendulum" was directed by FKA Twigs herself and premiered on 14 January 2015. A photo from the video set was first released on 29 July 2014, which depicts FKA Twigs hanging from the ceiling by her hair. A second photo from the set was posted to FKA Twigs' Instagram page on 6 October 2014. The video won a MOBO Award for Best Video on 4 November 2015, while earning FKA Twigs a nomination for Artist to Watch at the 2015 MTV Video Music Awards.

== Track listings ==
- Digital download
1. "Pendulum" – 4:58
- Limited edition 12" single

A. "Two Weeks" – 4:08
B. "Pendulum" – 4:58

== Personnel ==
Credits adapted from the liner notes of LP1.

- FKA Twigs – vocals, drums, keyboards, production, songwriting
- Cy An – additional drum edits, keyboards
- John Davis – mastering
- Paul Epworth – drums, guitar, keyboards, piano, production, songwriting
- Joseph Hartwell Jones – engineering

== Release history ==
Region	Date	Format	Label	Ref.
United Kingdom	29 July 2014	12" single	Young Turks	
United Kingdom	30 July 2014	Digital download	Young Turks	
