= EP1 (FKA Twigs EP) =

2012 EP by FKA Twigs

EP by FKA Twigs
- Released: 4 December 2012
- Recorded: 2012
- Genres: Alternative R&B; art pop; glitch; post-dubstep
- Length: 15:59
- Label: Self-released
- Producers: Twigs; Tic

FKA Twigs chronology
EP1 (2012)	EP2 (2013)

EP1 is the debut extended play (EP) by English singer FKA Twigs. It was independently released in vinyl format on 4 December 2012. The EP was re-released under the Young label in Japan packaged with LP1 and as a standalone product in October 2016. On 16 December 2016, EP1 officially became available to stream and buy on all music services. It had also been repressed on 12-inch vinyl and re-released by Young the same day. The vinyl re-issue originally went unavailable on Amazon within less than a month, later coming back in stock on 19 February 2017.

== Music videos ==
EP1 has a music video for every song appearing on the EP. The videos were directed by Grace Ladoja and FKA Twigs and released between July and December 2012.

"Weak Spot" is part one of four music videos. The video was released on 5 December 2012. The music video consists of a computer generated head. The visuals were made by Grace Ladoja, YouTuber rossisbudda, and FKA Twigs.

"Ache" is the part two of four music videos. The video was released on 8 August 2012. The music video consists of a male actor in a head suit.

"Breathe" is part three of four music videos. It was released on 5 December 2012. It was the last music video released from EP1. The video consists of FKA Twigs vandalizing a car, scratching the paint, and smashing the windows.

"Hide" is part four of the four music videos. The video was released on 10 July 2012 and was the first music video to be released from EP1. The video consists of twigs wearing nothing but a mesh bra and a red anthurium flower between her legs. It is age-restricted by YouTube.

== Track listing ==
All tracks are written by FKA Twigs.

No.	Title	Length
1.	"Weak Spot"	3:43
2.	"Ache"	5:00
3.	"Breathe"	4:17
4.	"Hide"	2:59

== Personnel ==
Credits adapted from the liner notes of EP1.

- FKA Twigs – vocals; production
- Tic – production

== Release history ==
Region	Date	Format	Label	Ref.
United Kingdom	4 December 2012	12" vinyl	Independent	
Japan	6 August 2014	CD; digital download (packaged with LP1)	Young Turks	
United States	19 February 2016	12" vinyl	Young Turks	
