= Sad Day (FKA Twigs song) =

2019 song by FKA Twigs

Single by FKA Twigs

from the album Magdalene
- Released: 4 November 2019
- Genre: Art pop
- Length: 4:16
- Label: Young Turks
- Songwriters: FKA Twigs; Lewis Roberts; Benny Blanco; Magnus Høiberg; Nicolas Jaar; Skrillex; Noah Goldstein
- Producers: FKA Twigs; Benny Blanco; Nicolas Jaar; Skrillex

FKA Twigs singles chronology
"Home with You" (2019)	"Sad Day" (2019)	"If You're Too Shy (Let Me Know)" (2020)

Music video
- "Sad Day" on YouTube

"Sad Day" (stylised in all lowercase) is a song by English singer FKA Twigs. Released on 9 November 2019 by Young Turks, it serves as the fourth and final single from Twigs' second studio album, Magdalene. The song was written and produced by Twigs, Koreless, Benny Blanco, Cashmere Cat, Nicolas Jaar, Skrillex, and Noah Goldstein.

== Composition ==
"Sad Day" is a slow art pop track with elements from electronic, pop, R&B, and industrial music. The lyrics of the song are about Twigs calling for her lover as he moves further away. Stacey Anderson of Pitchfork wrote that, on the song, "twigs’ eyes are open and her heart is tired." Rolling Stone's Jon Blistein wrote that the song "finds Twigs caught in the throes of unrequited love, deep passion and heartbreak." Musically, Twigs' vocals on the song are distorted, and the production was described as "shift[ing] between an atmospheric synthscape and industrial stomp," with digital effects that "suggest insistent rain, and a sly, scratchy bass drop [that] pierces the optimistic haze." Charlotte Krol of NME called it an "enciting," and "jittering, intimate track." In an interview with Beats 1, Twigs revealed that she considers the bridge on "Sad Day" to be the most emotional part of Magdalene for her.

== Music video ==
The accompanying music video for "Sad Day" was released on August 28, 2020. The video, which is more than 6 minutes long, was called a short film and was directed by Hiro Murai. In a press statement, Twigs revealed that the video was the culmination of all of her training and dancing, and that she had undergone three years of Wushu training. The video for "Sad Day" was partially inspired by a lyric from another Magdalene single, "Home with You", in which Twigs sings, "never seen a hero like me in a sci-fi."

=== Synopsis ===
In a Pitchfork cover story, Twigs described the concept for the video as that of a "couple whose emotional conflict is represented by a spectacular wushu duel." The video sees Twigs duelling Teake, a dancer Twigs cast over social media, in a swordfight around London. At the end of the video, Teake cuts Twigs in half in an apartment, but instead of flesh and blood, Murai stated that they wanted Twigs' insides to look "ethereal and otherworldly," resulting in something pink that bubbles and blooms inside Twigs' body.

=== Reception ===
The music video was well received. Twigs found praise for her swordsmanship and mastery of Wushu. Tom Breihan of Stereogum wrote, "FKA twigs has always made incredible music videos, and "sad day" ranks right up there with her best." Gregory Lawrence of Collider called the music video "surreal, inventive, and [a] psychologically exacting look at love, obsession, and ennui." and compared it to the works of David Lynch. In reference to the ending of the music video, Emily Lordi, writing for T: The New York Times Style Magazine, said, "the turn to the fantastic is signature Twigs."

== Critical reception ==
Pitchfork gave "Sad Day" "Best New Track" and they described Twigs's vocal as "her own defiance and anger, before she slips effortlessly back into airy entreaties".

=== Year-end lists ===
Year-end lists for "Sad Day"
Publication	List	Rank	Ref.
Pitchfork	The 100 Best Songs of 2019	67	
Rolling Stone	50 Best Songs of 2019	31	

== Personnel ==
- FKA Twigs – vocals
- Koreless – synths, synth strings
- Nicolas Jaar – synths, drums
- Benny Blanco – synths, drums
- Noah Goldstein – drums, engineering
- Hudson Mohawke – drums
- Skrillex – drums
- Manny Marroquin – mixing

== Charts ==
Chart (2019)	Peak position
US Hot Dance/Electronic Songs (Billboard)	16
