= EP2 (FKA Twigs EP) =

2013 EP by FKA Twigs

- Standard cover (Note: There are three different versions of the album cover: the first clearly shows Twigs' necklace, a second where it is blurred, and a third where it has been erased.)

EP by FKA Twigs
- Released: 17 September 2013
- Recorded: 2013
- Genres: Alternative R&B; art pop; post-dubstep
- Length: 15:00
- Label: Young Turks
- Producers: Twigs; Arca

FKA Twigs chronology
| EP1 (2012) | EP2 (2013) | LP1 (2014) |

EP2 is the second extended play (EP) by English singer FKA Twigs, released on 17 September 2013 by Young Turks. The song "Water Me" was released as a promotional single in 2013.

== Music videos ==
EP2 has a music video for every song appearing on the EP. The music videos were released between May and September 2013.

=== "How's That" ===
"How's That" is the first music video released from EP2. The video was released on 3 May 2013. The video depicts a computer generated body falling apart in thin air. The visuals were made by Jesse Kanda.

=== "Water Me" ===
"Water Me" is the second music video released from EP2. The video was released on 1 August 2013. The video consists of a close up of FKA twigs' face, bobbing frantically. She begins to cry and it "waters" her, causing her eyes to grow larger.

"Water Me" was directed by Jesse Kanda and FKA twigs. The executive producer was Juliette Larthe, and the head of production was Margo Mars, both from Prettybird. The producer was Shimmy. The cinematographer was Sy Turnbull. The stylist was Jean Paul Paula, and the makeup was by Bea Sweet.

=== "Papi Pacify" ===
"Papi Pacify" is the third music video released from EP2. The video was released on 13 September 2013. The video consists of FKA twigs and an uncredited male in various poses. The video was directed by Tom Beard and FKA twigs. It was edited by Ben Crook and produced by Cherise Payne. The cinematographer is Katie Swan. The makeup was done by Bea Sweet, the hair was done by Lok Lau, the nails were done by Michelle Humphrey, and the stylist was Jean Paul Paula.

=== "Ultraviolet" ===
"Ultraviolet" is the fourth and last music video released from EP2. The video was released 20 September 2013. Though it is classified as a music video, it is only an image of a kaleidoscope-view of FKA Twigs' mouth.

== Critical Reception ==
Professional ratings
Review scores
| Source | Rating |
|---|---|
| The 405 | 8.5/10 |
| AllMusic | 4/5 stars |
| Consequence | B |
| DIY | 8/10 |
| Dummy | 8/10 |
| The Line of Best Fit | 6/10 |
| The Observer | 3/5 stars |
| Pitchfork | 8/10 |
| Pretty Much Amazing | B+ |
| Tiny Mix Tapes | 4/5 marks |

Heather Phares from AllMusic described EP2 as "haunting, evocative", and "downright lush" compared to its predecessor EP1. Phares also pointed out that "her lyrics are even more revealing." Pitchfork awarded "Water Me" and "Papi Pacify" Best New Track upon the songs' release, while describing EP2 as "a work that bears down on you, barely allowing any room to breathe."

== Track listing ==
All tracks are written by FKA Twigs and Arca.

| No. | Title | Length |
|---|---|---|
| 1. | "How's That" | 3:34 |
| 2. | "Papi Pacify" | 4:54 |
| 3. | "Water Me" | 3:25 |
| 4. | "Ultraviolet" | 3:07 |

== Personnel ==
Credits adapted from the liner notes of EP2.

- Twigs – vocals (all tracks); production (tracks 2–3)
- Arca – production (all tracks); vocal production (tracks 3–4)
- Matt Colton – mastering
- Liam Howe – vocal production (tracks 3–4)

== Charts ==
| Chart (2013) | Peak position |
|---|---|
| US Heatseekers Albums (Billboard) | 13 |
| US Top Dance Albums (Billboard) | 5 |

== Release history ==
| Region | Date | Format(s) | Label | Ref. |
|---|---|---|---|---|
| United Kingdom | 17 September 2013 | 12-inch vinyl; digital download | Young Turks | |
| United States | 17 September 2013 | Digital download | Young Turks | |
| United States | 19 May 2014 | 12-inch vinyl | XL | |
