= LP1 (FKA Twigs album) =

2014 studio album by FKA Twigs

Studio album by FKA Twigs
- Released: 6 August 2014
- Recorded: 2013–2014
- Studio: Emile Haynie's Studio (Note: Tracks 3, 4, 6 and 9)
- Genres: Avant-pop; alternative R&B; electronic; art pop; post-dubstep
- Length: 40:46
- Label: Young Turks
- Producers: Arca; Clams Casino; Cy An; Paul Epworth; FKA Twigs; Emile Haynie; Devonté Hynes; Inc.; Sampha; Tic

FKA Twigs chronology
EP2 (2013)	LP1 (2014)	M3LL155X (2015)

Singles from LP1
- 1. "Two Weeks" Released: 24 June 2014; 2. "Pendulum" Released: 29 July 2014; 3. "Video Girl" Released: 13 October 2014

LP1 is the debut studio album by English singer-songwriter FKA Twigs, released on 6 August 2014 by Young Turks. Production for the album is handled by FKA Twigs herself, alongside Emile Haynie, Arca, Cy An, Devonté Hynes, Clams Casino, Paul Epworth, Sampha and Tic.

Upon release, LP1 received widespread critical acclaim, and placed high on several year-end critics' lists. The album spawned three singles: "Two Weeks", "Pendulum" and "Video Girl". The album was nominated for the 2014 Mercury Prize and the award for Best Recording Package at the 2015 Grammy Awards.

== Background ==
FKA Twigs (then known simply as Twigs) self-released her debut extended play, EP1, on Bandcamp on 4 December 2012. Music videos were filmed for each of the four tracks and released on her YouTube channel. On 6 August 2013, The Guardian profiled FKA Twigs for their "New Band of the Day" feature, describing her as "[t]he UK's best example to date of ethereal, twisted R&B."

FKA Twigs's second extended play, EP2, was released through the Young Turks record label on 17 September 2013. It was produced by FKA Twigs and Arca. In December 2013, she was nominated for the BBC Sound of 2014, and was chosen by Spotify for their Spotlight on 2014 list. FKA Twigs was featured on Billboard's 14 Artists to Watch in 2014.

== Composition and lyrics ==
On LP1, Twigs expands her avant-pop landscape, yielding "boundaries-pushing" pop music. It also dons a large electronic component. Indeed, Entertainment Weekly felt that without Twigs' voice, it would be a work of avant-garde electronics. It is seen for its "glitchy futuristic" take on R&B, casting the genre in "thrilling hyper-real hues". Stereogum saw Twigs' music as "fluid" experimental R&B, while Q saw it as an "uncanny" fusion of indie R&B with "nervy" trip hop.

Lyrically, LP1 deals with themes of sex, sexual relations and intimacy.

== Singles ==
The lead single from LP1, "Two Weeks", was released on 24 June 2014 as a digital download and on 29 July 2014 as a 12-inch single, the latter featuring the song "Pendulum" as a B-side. The music video was directed by Nabil Elderkin and premiered on 24 June 2014. "Pendulum" was released digitally as the album's second single on 30 July 2014. The self-directed music video for the song premiered on 14 January 2015 and depicts FKA Twigs tied up with her own hair.

"Video Girl", a track inspired by Twigs' experiences following her appearance in Jessie J's "Price Tag" music video, was sent to contemporary hit radio in the United Kingdom on 13 October 2014 as the album's third and final single. The accompanying music video was directed by Kahlil Joseph and premiered on 29 October 2014. The black-and-white video sees FKA Twigs dancing for a prisoner on death row, and features a cameo appearance from rapper Travis Scott.

== Critical reception ==
Professional ratings
Aggregate scores
Source	Rating
AnyDecentMusic?	8.5/10
Metacritic	86/100
Review scores
Source	Rating
AllMusic	5/5 stars
The A.V. Club	A−
Entertainment Weekly	A
The Guardian	4/5 stars
The Independent	5/5 stars
NME	8/10
Pitchfork	8.8/10
Q	4/5 stars
Rolling Stone	3.5/5 stars
Spin	9/10

LP1 received widespread acclaim from music critics. At Metacritic, which assigns a normalised rating out of 100 to reviews from mainstream publications, the album received an average score of 86, based on 38 reviews, indicating "universal acclaim". Miles Raymer of Entertainment Weekly stated, "A singular kind of diva who asserts herself subtly, twigs sings in a near whisper that often threatens to blend in with the instruments behind it. But she exerts enough of a magnetic pull to lure listeners into some challenging territory". Christopher Hooton of The Independent wrote that "while sultry, drug-addled R&B is an increasingly crowded genre, Twigs takes a hammer to the kind that The Weeknd made famous and plays in the rubble." Hooton continued, "FKA Twigs emerges the high priestess of R&B's latest corruption, and the world will kneel at the altar." Kyle Fowle of The A.V. Club commended FKA Twigs for "manag[ing] to craft a cohesive aesthetic that draws on modern R&B and electronic while also remaining inventive", concluding, "Few debuts possess such control and ambition all in one; LP1 is the rare album that manages to sound both lived in and completely futuristic." AllMusic's Heather Phares noted the album contains "a lusher sound that's more accessible, and more overtly R&B, than FKA Twigs' earlier work but maintains its ethereal sensuality", adding that "FKA Twigs' music was already so fully realized that LP 1 can't really be called Barnett coming into her own; rather, her music has been tended to since the 'Water Me' days, and now it's flourishing."

Jonathan Zwickel of Spin described the album as "unconventional stuff, drug-like, elemental and extraterrestrial" and opined, "In its menacing incandescence, LP1 sounds like nothing else in the world right now." Pitchfork's Philip Sherburne praised LP1 as a "huge album" and a "monumental debut", while writing that "FKA twigs is not a masterful lyricist, at least not yet; some of her couplets feel clunky, like she's grasping in the dark for rhymes and coming up with the objects closest to hand [...] But when she zeroes in on the essence of a thing, she hits hard." Alexis Petridis of The Guardian viewed the album as "a singular piece of work in an overcrowded market", and expressed that it "has its flaws [...] but you leave it convinced that FKA Twigs is an artist possessed of a genuinely strong and unique vision, one that doesn't need bolstering with an aura of mystique." Hazel Sheffield of NME commented that the album "impresses with its futuristic vision of R&B" and remarked that FKA Twigs's "pervading sense of control and commitment to her art proves that Twigs is set on building the sound of the future all by herself." Felicity Martin of Clash stated, "Fragile, heavenly and utterly compelling; this debut paves the way for boundaries-pushing pop. This is music that shatters you with a single tap." Q praised the music as an "uncanny" hybrid variously recalling "indie R&B... and nervy trip hop". Rolling Stone's Julianne Escobedo Shepherd found the album to be "far more substantial" than FKA Twigs's two previously released EPs, adding that her "deconstructed shards of U.K. grime and garage land heavier, while elegiac vocals soften the songs without blunting their edge."

=== Accolades ===
On 19 August 2014, LP1 was included at number 87 on Pitchfork's list of The 100 Best Albums of the Decade So Far. The album was shortlisted for the 2014 Mercury Prize. It was also nominated for Best Recording Package at the 57th Annual Grammy Awards. In late 2014, LP1 was voted the fifth best record of 2014 in the Pazz & Jop, an annual poll of American critics published by The Village Voice.

Year-end rankings of LP1
Publication	List	Rank	Ref.
The A.V. Club	The 20 Best Albums of 2014	6	
Clash	Top 40 Albums of 2014	1	
CMJ	The 30 Best Albums of 2014	2	
Complex	The 50 Best Albums of 2014	10	
Cosmopolitan	The 20 Best Albums of 2014	18	
The Daily Telegraph	Best 50 Albums of 2014	17	
Drowned in Sound	50 Favourite Albums of 2014	15	
Entertainment Weekly	10 Best Albums of 2014	9	
Fact	The 50 Best Albums of 2014	16	
The Guardian	The Best Albums of 2014	3	
The Huffington Post	The 23 Best Albums of 2014	Unranked	
Mojo	50 Best Albums of 2014	9	
musicOMH	Top 100 Albums of 2014	5	
NME	Top 50 Albums of 2014	21	
Paste	The 50 Best Albums of 2014	35	
Pitchfork	The 50 Best Albums of 2014	2	
PopMatters	The 80 Best Albums of 2014	8	
Q	Top 50 Albums of 2014	8	
The Quietus	Albums of the Year 2014	11	
Rolling Stone	50 Best Albums of 2014	16	
Slant Magazine	The 25 Best Albums of 2014	7	
Spin	The 50 Best Albums of 2014	21	
Stereogum	The 50 Best Albums of 2014	9	
Time	Top 10 Best Albums of 2014	1	
Time Out London	The 30 Best Albums of 2014	7	
Uncut	The Top 75 Albums of the Year	4	
Under the Radar	Top 140 Albums of 2014	13	
Vulture	The 32 Best Pop Albums of 2014	15	

Decade-end rankings of LP1
Publication	List	Rank	Ref.
AllMusic	The AllMusic Decade in Review	—	
The A.V. Club	The 50 best albums of the 2010s	7	
Beats Per Minute	BPM's Top 50 Albums of the 2010s	8	
Consequence	The Top 100 Albums of the 2010s	73	
Crack Magazine	The top 100 albums of the decade	10	
Mixmag	The 72 best albums of the decade 2010–2019	—	
Paper	PAPER's Top 10 Albums of the '10s	—	
Paste	The 100 Best Albums of the 2010s	62	
Pitchfork	The 200 Best Albums of the 2010s	28	
Resident Advisor	2010-19: Albums Of The Decade	—	
Slant Magazine	The 100 Best Albums of the 2010s	19	
Stereogum	The 100 Best Albums Of The 2010s	36	
Uproxx	All The Best Albums Of The 2010s, Ranked	60	
Vice	The 100 Best Albums of the 2010s	86	

== Commercial performance ==
LP1 debuted at number 16 on the UK Albums Chart, selling 4,051 copies in its first week. In the United States, the album debuted at number 30 on the Billboard 200 with first-week sales of 10,370 copies. As of August 2015, the album had sold 77,000 copies in the United States.

== Track listing ==
No.	Title	Writer(s)	Producer(s)	Length
1.	"Preface"	FKA Twigs; Lucki	FKA Twigs	1:46
2.	"Lights On"	FKA Twigs; Arca; Tic	Arca	4:24
3.	"Two Weeks"	FKA Twigs; Emile Haynie	Haynie; FKA Twigs^{[a]}	4:07
4.	"Hours"	FKA Twigs; Haynie; Devonté Hynes; Michael Volpe; Arca	Haynie; Hynes; Clams Casino; Arca	4:35
5.	"Pendulum"	FKA Twigs; Paul Epworth	Epworth; FKA Twigs	4:58
6.	"Video Girl"	FKA Twigs; Haynie	Haynie; FKA Twigs^{[a]}	3:47
7.	"Numbers"	FKA Twigs; Sampha	FKA Twigs; Sampha	3:43
8.	"Closer"	FKA Twigs; Tic	FKA Twigs; Cy An^{[a]}; Tic^{[a]}	3:45
9.	"Give Up"	FKA Twigs; Haynie	Haynie; Arca^{[a]}	4:17
10.	"Kicks"	FKA Twigs; Joel Compass	FKA Twigs; Cy An^{[a]}	5:24
Total length:				40:46

Japanese edition bonus tracks (EP1)
No.	Title	Writer(s)	Producer(s)	Length
11.	"Weak Spot"	FKA Twigs	FKA Twigs; Tic	3:43
12.	"Ache"	FKA Twigs	FKA Twigs; Tic	5:00
13.	"Breathe"	FKA Twigs	FKA Twigs; Tic	4:16
14.	"Hide"	FKA Twigs	FKA Twigs; Tic	2:59

Limited deluxe edition bonus 7-inch vinyl
No.	Title	Writer(s)	Producer(s)	Length
1.	"One Time"	FKA Twigs; Inc.	Inc.; FKA Twigs	4:16

=== Notes ===
- ^{^[a]} signifies an additional producer

== Personnel ==
Credits adapted from the liner notes of LP1.

=== Musicians ===
- FKA Twigs – vocals (all tracks); instruments (track 1); string arrangements, bass arrangement (track 2); additional drums (tracks 2, 6); Tempest (tracks 3, 7); drums (tracks 5, 8, 10); keyboards (track 5); bass (track 7); synths (track 10)
- Lucki Eck$ – demon voice (track 1)
- Arca – additional vocals (track 2); additional programming (tracks 3, 4); synth (track 3); instruments (track 4); additional sounds, programming (track 9)
- Andrew Aged – guitar (track 2)
- Tic – guitar (tracks 2, 8); additional drums (track 2); drums (track 8)
- Daniel Aged – upright bass (track 2); additional keyboards (track 10)
- Emile Haynie – instruments, drums (tracks 3, 9); synths, Mellotron, additional drums (track 4)
- Devonté Hynes – guitar (track 4)
- Paul Epworth – drums, guitar, keyboards, piano (track 5)
- Cy An – keyboards, additional drum edits (track 5); additional programming (track 6); piano (tracks 6, 10); drums (tracks 8, 10); synths (track 10)
- LJ Howe – bass guitar (track 6)
- Sampha – drums, synths, piano (track 7)

=== Technical ===
- FKA Twigs – production (tracks 1, 5, 7, 8, 10); additional production (tracks 3, 6)
- Joseph Hartwell Jones – vocal recording (tracks 2, 3, 9, 10); additional vocal recording (track 4); engineering (track 5); additional engineering (track 6)
- Arca – production (tracks 2, 4); additional production (track 9)
- Emile Haynie – production, recording (tracks 3, 4, 6, 9)
- Devonté Hynes – production (track 4)
- Clams Casino – production (track 4)
- Paul Epworth – production (track 5)
- Sampha – production (track 7)
- Cy An – additional production (tracks 8, 10)
- Tic – additional production (track 8)
- David Wrench – mixing
- John Davis – mastering at Metropolis Mastering (London)

=== Artwork ===
- Jesse Kanda – imagery
- FKA Twigs – design
- Phil Lee – design

== Charts ==
=== Weekly charts ===
Weekly chart performance for LP1
Chart (2014–2015)	Peak position
Australian Albums (ARIA)	30
Austrian Albums (Ö3 Austria)	42
Belgian Albums (Ultratop Flanders)	16
Belgian Albums (Ultratop Wallonia)	46
Danish Albums (Hitlisten)	14
Dutch Albums (Album Top 100)	60
French Albums (SNEP)	94
German Albums (Offizielle Top 100)	50
Irish Albums (IRMA)	33
Irish Independent Albums (IRMA)	6
Japanese Albums (Oricon)	109
New Zealand Albums (RMNZ)	38
Scottish Albums (Official Charts)	34
Swiss Albums (Schweizer Hitparade)	43
UK Albums (Official Charts)	16
UK Independent Albums (Official Charts)	1
US Billboard 200	30
US Independent Albums (Billboard)	3
US Top Dance Albums (Billboard)	1

=== Year-end charts ===
2014 year-end chart performance for LP1
Chart (2014)	Position
US Top Dance/Electronic Albums (Billboard)	17

2015 year-end chart performance for LP1
Chart (2015)	Position
US Top Dance/Electronic Albums (Billboard)	10

== Release history ==
Release dates and formats for LP1
Region	Date	Format	Edition	Label	Ref(s)
Japan	6 August 2014	CD	Standard	Hostess	
Australia	8 August 2014	CD; digital download	Standard	Young Turks	
Germany	8 August 2014	CD; LP; digital download	Standard	Young Turks; XL	
Germany	8 August 2014	LP + 7-inch	Limited deluxe	Young Turks; XL	
Ireland	8 August 2014	CD; digital download	Standard	Young Turks	
France	11 August 2014	CD; digital download	Standard	Young Turks	
United Kingdom	11 August 2014	CD; LP; digital download	Standard	Young Turks	
United Kingdom	11 August 2014	LP + 7-inch	Limited deluxe	Young Turks	
United States	12 August 2014	CD; digital download	Standard	XL	
Australia	15 August 2014	LP	Standard	Young Turks	
France	18 August 2014	LP	Standard	Young Turks	
France	18 August 2014	LP + 7-inch	Limited deluxe	Young Turks	
United States	25 August 2014	LP	Standard	XL	
United States	25 August 2014	LP + 7-inch	Limited deluxe	XL	

== See also ==
- List of 2014 albums
- List of Billboard number-one electronic albums of 2014
- List of UK Independent Albums Chart number ones of 2014
