= Koop Islands =

Studio album by Koop
- Released: Sep. 27, 2006
- Studio: Koopland Studio
- Genres: Electronic; lounge; jazz; downtempo
- Label: !K7
- Producers: Magnus Zingmark; Oscar Simonsson

Koop chronology
Waltz for Koop (2001)	Koop Islands (2006)	Coup de Grâce (Best of Koop 1997–2007) (2010)

Professional ratings
Review scores
Source	Rating
Allmusic	4/5 stars

Koop Islands is the third and final studio album by the Stockholm-based electronic music duo Koop, released on September 27, 2006, two years prior to their disbanding in 2008. Compared to their last success Waltz for Koop, Koop Islands combines inspiration by 1930's swing with an exotic Caribbean touch. Collaborators include Yukimi Nagano (of Little Dragon), Ane Brun, Rob Gallagher, and others.

== Track listing ==
1. "Koop Island Blues " – 4:34
2. "Come to Me" – 2:51
3. "Forces....Darling" – 5:03
4. "I See a Different You" – 3:16
5. "Let's Elope" – 3:14
6. "The Moonbounce" – 2:46
7. "Beyond the Son" – 4:53
8. "Whenever There Is You" – 4:01
9. "Drum Rhythm A (Music for Ballet Exercises)" – 2:14

Some editions include a bonus track: "I See a Different You (Marcus Enochson Remix)"

== In popular culture ==
- "Koop Island Blues" can be heard in the Season 1 Episode 7 of Intergalactic
- "Koop Island Blues" can be heard in the 2009 video game, The Saboteur
- "Koop Island Blues" was used in a routine by Mia Michaels for Evan Kasprzak and Randi Evans during the fifth season of So You Think You Can Dance.
- "Koop Island Blues" can be heard in the background of the 6th cinematic clip in the game World in Conflict.
- "Koop Island Blues" can also be heard in the twenty-fifth episode of season two of 90210.
- "Koop Island Blues" can also be heard in the fifth episode of season one of Breaking Bad.
- "Koop Island Blues" can also be heard in the twelfth episode of the fifth season of The L Word.
- "Koop Island Blues" can also be heard in the movie Patong Girl (2014).
- "Koop Island Blues" (French version) can also be heard in the movie Bravo Virtuoso (2017), an Armenian-French-Belgian black comedy by Levon Minasian.
- "Koop Island Blues" can also be heard in the movie A Hairy Tale (2019).

== Credits ==
- Bass [Walking] – Dan Berglund (tracks: 2 3)
- Double bass – Martin Höper (tracks: 1 4 5 6 8)
- Percussion – Ola Bothzén (tracks: 5 6 7)
- Vibraphone – Mattias Ståhl (tracks: 3 4 7)
- Vocals – Ane Brun (track: 1), Yukimi Nagano (tracks: 2 4 8)

== Certifications ==
The album was awarded a silver certification from the Independent Music Companies Association which indicated sales of at least 30,000 copies throughout Europe.

Region	Certification	Certified units/sales
Sweden (GLF)	Gold	30,000^{^}
^{^} Shipments figures based on certification alone.
