= Ritual Union =

Studio album by Little Dragon
- Released: 21 July 2011
- Recorded: 2007–2011
- Genre: Electropop; synth-pop; R&B
- Length: 43:17
- Label: Peacefrog
- Producer: Little Dragon

Little Dragon chronology
Machine Dreams (2009)	Ritual Union (2011)	Nabuma Rubberband (2014)

Singles from Ritual Union
- 1. "Nightlight" Released: 12 April 2011; 2. "Ritual Union" Released: 25 July 2011; 3. "Little Man" Released: 31 October 2011

Ritual Union is the third studio album by Swedish electronic music band Little Dragon. It was released initially on 21 July 2011 in the Netherlands on Century Media Records, then on a rolling release schedule from 22-29 July 2011 by Peacefrog Records. The album reached number 47 in the band's native Sweden, as well as number 28 on the UK Albums Chart and number 78 on the US Billboard 200. The album's second single, "Ritual Union", peaked at number 76 on the UK Singles Chart. Ritual Union received generally positive reviews from music critics.

== Cover art ==
The album cover consists of a montage of newly married couples. In an interview with website BrightestYoungThings, lead singer Yukimi Nagano said, "It's a bunch of pics of our parents and relatives so there's that obvious connection [the overt idea of marriage]. But it's basically one perspective on the whole 'Ritual Union' theme which is pretty ambiguous. It can represent a band, a marriage, humanity, the universe... what ever you feel connected to." Speaking to Canadian music magazine Exclaim!, drummer Erik Bodin elaborated on the album cover's concept:

We thought that we would break out from the paint world [of previous album covers] into the photographic world [...] Everything was done musically and we'd mastered mostly everything and we needed a cover ASAP. And we came up with the idea, why don't we just put wedding pictures of our parents and at first we thought that maybe that's just a little too obvious. But then, the way it looked, we started loving it, because it has this sort of... I don't know wedding pictures, they capture that weird expectation in life that you've made the right move, this is the beginning of something new. Sadly, most of those people are divorced. It's one of the many references to the ritual union. I think the wedding and those things are one thing of the ritual unions, but also I think we are also referring to music as a ritual union. Live performance is a ritual union, one of the few that still exists in the Western world. And yeah, we like it.

== Release and promotion ==
The band made their television debut on Late Night with Jimmy Fallon on 21 March 2011, performing "Ritual Union". "Nightlight" was released on 12 April 2011 as the album's lead single. The title track was released as the album's second single on 25 July 2011. On the same day, an animated video for "When I Go Out", directed by Italian artist Emanuele Kabu, was released. The third and final single, "Little Man", was released on 31 October 2011.

The song "Shuffle a Dream" was used in the fifth season premiere episode of Gossip Girl, "Yes, Then Zero", originally aired 26 September 2011. "Nightlight" was included on the soundtrack to the 2011 video game FIFA 12. "Crystalfilm" was featured in the PlayStation 4, Xbox One and Microsoft Windows versions of Grand Theft Auto V.

"Seconds" was sampled by Eminem on the track "Normal" from 2018's Kamikaze.

== Critical reception ==
Professional ratings
Aggregate scores
Source	Rating
AnyDecentMusic?	7.2/10
Metacritic	78/100
Review scores
Source	Rating
AllMusic	4/5 stars
The Daily Telegraph	5/5 stars
Entertainment Weekly	B+
The Guardian	4/5 stars
The Independent	4/5 stars
Mojo	4/5 stars
NME	7/10
Pitchfork	6.7/10
Rolling Stone	4/5 stars
Spin	7/10

Ritual Union received generally positive reviews from music critics. At Metacritic, which assigns a normalised rating out of 100 to reviews from mainstream publications, the album received an average score of 78, based on 30 reviews. The Daily Telegraph's Andrew Perry described the album as a "spellbinding collection of digital exotica", concluding, "Though consistently ground-breaking and lyrically challenging, Ritual Union never feels like hard work." Slant Magazine's Kevin Liedel noted that the band "often places rhythm and texture at the forefront of their songs, but as on Machine Dreams, gifted lead singer Yukimi Nagano continues to be the greatest facet of the band's style-spanning sound—a husky, beguiling force that seamlessly swaps power and sexuality for aloofness and anguish from track to track". Will Hermes of Rolling Stone stated that the album "hits a sweet spot between the futuristic soul of their debut and the synth pop of 2009's Machine Dreams". Joe Lynch of Entertainment Weekly wrote, "Straddling the line between slinky funk and outsider electronica, [Ritual Union] is full of pheromone-drenched surprises: It's ambient R&B for restless nights." Andy Kellman of AllMusic opined that while Ritual Union "represents a fusion and refinement of the group's first two albums", the group "puts some twists on its sound, and Yukimi Nagano's lyrical thorns, typically concealed by her subtle approach [...] are sharper than ever".

Maddy Costa of The Guardian commented that Nagano's "impassioned vocals suffuse each song with emotion", adding that "as the album withdraws from the dancefloor to the lonelier darkness of 'Summertearz' and 'Seconds', Nagano lures you to follow". Reef Younis of Clash wrote, "Straightaway Yukimi Nagano's husky-yet-girlish vocal weaves amidst the shape-shifting backdrops of minimal funk, dreamy pop and electro soul, and you're mesmerised." The Independent's Andy Gill complimented Nagano's "bewitching" vocals and stated she is "surely destined to become one of the voices of the year, while her accomplices' subtle confections of minimal electro throbs and stripped-back beats has an alluring simplicity that's like a refreshing, palate-cleansing sorbet". Marc Hogan of Spin praised the album as "another slab of great Scandinavian pop" and expressed that it "deepens the group's down-tempo mix of icy techno and smoldering R&B". At NME, Dan Martin viewed Ritual Union as "a conflicted, confusing album that's as infuriating as it is intermittently enchanting", adding that "on this lovely little patchwork pop record, there's enough going on to make you actually quite scared of what they'd come up with if they had a budget". Matthew Perpetua of Pitchfork felt that "[t]he problem with Ritual Union is that even though every song on the album is built on the foundation of some very good musical ideas and at least one engaging hook, the material nevertheless seems rather under-written [...] This doesn't diminish the charm of the music, per se, but it can be very frustrating to hear songs right on the precipice of greatness".

=== Accolades ===
Publication	Accolade	Rank	Ref.
Beats Per Minute	The Top 50 Albums of 2011	45	
Clash	The Top 40 Albums of 2011	31	
musicOMH	Top 50 Albums of 2011	15	
Rolling Stone	50 Best Albums of 2011	41	
Uncut	Top 50 Albums of 2011	37	

== Track listing ==
All tracks are written by Little Dragon.

No.	Title	Length
1.	"Ritual Union"	3:30
2.	"Little Man"	2:41
3.	"Brush the Heat"	4:10
4.	"Shuffle a Dream"	2:58
5.	"Please Turn"	3:34
6.	"Crystalfilm"	4:49
7.	"Precious"	3:51
8.	"Nightlight"	3:25
9.	"Summertearz"	3:50
10.	"When I Go Out"	5:59
11.	"Seconds"	4:30

== Charts ==
Chart (2011)	Peak position
Australian Albums (ARIA)	91
Scottish Albums (OCC)	61
Swedish Albums (Sverigetopplistan)	47
UK Albums (OCC)	22
UK Independent Albums (OCC)	5
US Billboard 200	78
US Independent Albums (Billboard)	12
US Top Dance Albums (Billboard)	4

== Release history ==
Region	Date	Label	Ref.
Netherlands	21 July 2011	Century Media	
Germany	22 July 2011	Peacefrog	
Ireland	22 July 2011	Peacefrog	
United Kingdom	25 July 2011	Peacefrog	
United States	26 July 2011	Peacefrog	
Sweden	27 July 2011	Peacefrog	
Australia	29 July 2011	Peacefrog	
France	5 September 2011	EMI	
