= Nabuma Rubberband =

Studio album by Little Dragon
- Released: 9 May 2014
- Recorded: 2013–2014
- Genre: Trip hop; soul; pop
- Length: 42:50
- Label: Because
- Producer: Little Dragon; Robin Hannibal

Little Dragon chronology
Ritual Union (2011)	Nabuma Rubberband (2014)	Season High (2017)

Singles from Nabuma Rubberband
- 1. "Klapp Klapp" Released: 14 February 2014; 2. "Paris" Released: 10 April 2014; 3. "Let Go" Released: 22 April 2014

Nabuma Rubberband is the fourth studio album by Swedish electronic music band Little Dragon, released on 9 May 2014 by Because Music. It features collaborations with Dave from De La Soul and Robin Hannibal. The album spawned three singles: "Klapp Klapp", "Paris" and "Let Go". Nabuma Rubberband was nominated for Best Dance/Electronic Album at the 57th Annual Grammy Awards.

== Background ==
Little Dragon started working on their fourth studio album in early 2013 in their hometown of Gothenburg, Sweden, after extensively touring in support of their 2011 album Ritual Union. "I think when we started we had no vision whatsoever", singer Yukimi Nagano said. "We just wanted to make the ball start rolling and just brainstorm ideas and see what comes up and then make plans thereafter. I think a lot of visions came through. Our sound is wide—it's not just one particular style—so we dove into different worlds. New worlds, new spaces we haven't been to before. There definitely are elements of sonically romantic tracks. It feels like there are different moods and we're exploring ourselves a bit." By October 2013, the band had finished most of the work on the album.

String players from the Gothenburg Symphony Orchestra are featured on a few songs from the album, marking the first time Little Dragon have collaborated with outside musicians. "It's nice to see your music reflected on another musician", drummer Erik Bodin said. "Especially when they come from the outside and you can see how they interpret it. It's an honor." Other collaborators include Dave of De La Soul, who co-wrote the songs "Mirror" and "Killing Me", and Robin Hannibal, who co-produced "Killing Me" and "Let Go".

Nagano cited Janet Jackson as an influence on Nabuma Rubberband, particularly her song "Any Time, Any Place" (1993). "When you put some of Janet's really slow stuff on you feel like you're floating", Nagano said. "That feeling really influenced me and maybe that's why there are quite a lot of slow jams on the record. In the past we've been a bit self-conscious about making slow jams after 'Twice.' Then we wanted to make dance music which we did with Machine Dreams and then Ritual Union still had a dance vibe, but with this album it wasn't about that. The intention was about whatever we felt strongly about."

== Promotion and release ==
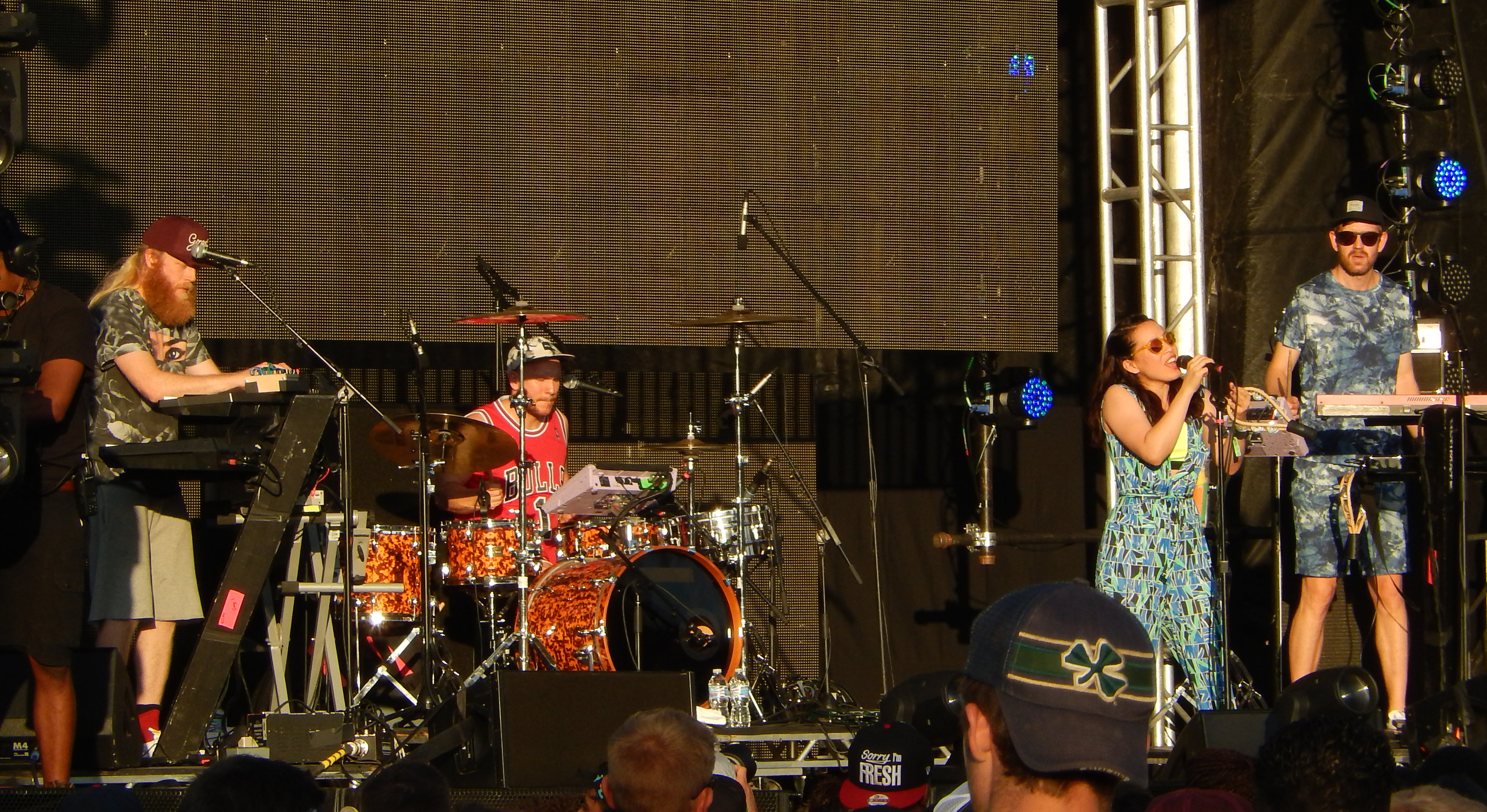
Little Dragon performing in Chicago in 2014

The album's title was revealed to be Nabuma Rubberband on 28 January 2014, when a 28-second trailer for the album containing the title track premiered online. According to Nagano, Nabuma is a river in the Congo, as well as the name of the sister of Ugandan reggae artist Madoxx, with whom the other three members of Little Dragon toured in Uganda around 2003, while performing as a reggae group. Her name came up while the band were working on the beat for the album's title track, on which Nagano sings about being "blinded by a rubberband". "We have a track on the album called 'Nabuma Rubberband' and on the cover there's a picture of a girl jumping so I liked the idea of it being her name. It seems quite awkward to have a little Chinese girl with a Ugandan name and Rubberband as a last name", Nagano added.

The cover art, release date and track listing were unveiled on 13 February 2014. Following the album's announcement, Little Dragon played a six-date European tour from 20 February to 5 March, including shows in Amsterdam, Hamburg, Berlin, London, Stockholm and Paris. On 27 March 2014, the band announced a North American spring tour, which kicked off at the Soul'd Out Music Festival in Portland, Oregon, on 10 April. Additional dates in Europe, North America and Japan were announced on 27 May, beginning at the We Love Green festival in Paris on 31 May, and wrapping up the tour with a string of eight shows across the United Kingdom in November. On 9 May 2014, the album was exclusively streamed on The Guardian's website.

A remix version of the album by OG Ron C and DJ Candlestick of The Chopstars, titled Nabuma Purple Rubberband, was made available for download and streaming via Adult Swim's website on 27 January 2015. "Pink Cloud" was released on 18 April 2015 as a limited-edition pink marbled 12-inch vinyl for Record Store Day.

=== Singles ===
"Klapp Klapp" was released on 14 February 2014 as the album's lead single. The accompanying music video was directed by Taylor Cohen and debuted on the same day. On 19 February, Little Dragon performed "Klapp Klapp" on Late Show with David Letterman. The band also performed the single on Later... with Jools Holland on 6 May.

The album's second single, "Paris", was released on 10 April 2014, followed by its Trevor Kane-directed video, which premiered on 2 May. Little Dragon performed "Paris" on The Queen Latifah Show on 23 April, and on 22 May, the band performed "Klapp Klapp" and "Killing Me" on Jimmy Kimmel Live! "Let Go" was released on 22 April 2014 as the third single from the album.

== Critical reception ==
Professional ratings
Aggregate scores
Source	Rating
AnyDecentMusic?	7.0/10
Metacritic	77/100
Review scores
Source	Rating
AllMusic	4.5/5 stars
Financial Times	4/5 stars
The Irish Times	4/5 stars
Mojo	4/5 stars
NME	7/10
The Observer	3/5 stars
Pitchfork	6.8/10
Q	4/5 stars
Slant Magazine	4/5 stars
Uncut	7/10

Nabuma Rubberband received generally positive reviews from music critics. At Metacritic, which assigns a normalised rating out of 100 to reviews from mainstream publications, the album received an average score of 77, based on 21 reviews. Will Salmon of Clash wrote that "[t]he production is shimmering and spacious, Yukimi Nagano's vocals the centre of a cat's cradle of glittering synths and down-tempo beats." He added that the album is "altogether more assured" and "match[es] the brilliance" of the band's live sets". Regarding the contributions from Dave of De La Soul and Robin Hannibal ("Mirror", "Killing Me" and "Let Go"), Andy Kellman of AllMusic stated, "Subtract those contributions and [Nabuma Rubberband] would still be the group's most accomplished work." Nathan Stevens of PopMatters expressed that "Nagano has plenty of stunning moments on Nabuma Rubberband, but it's clear this is a full band enterprise", noting that "[t]he dynamic chemistry between [Fredrik Källgren Wallin and Erik Bodin] drives a majority of these songs along." Huw Oliver of DIY commented that on Nabuma Rubberband, the band's "drum-and-synths minimalism is more refined, the bass-lines more prominent, the hooks almost embarrassingly memorable", and that Nagano's "effortless vocal is staggering." Slant Magazine's Kevin Liedel opined that "Nabuma Rubberband's triumph doesn't stem merely from its creators' newfound confidence. Rather, the album often serves as a paradigm of expertly managed complexity, each track balancing dozens of moving parts and teeming with melodic percolation."

John Murphy of musicOMH concluded, "While Nabuma Rubberband may not be the commercial breakthrough that some may have expected, it's still a largely enjoyable record and, together with fellow Swede Lykke Li's new album, proves once again that nobody does swooningly melancholic pop quite like the Scandanavians [sic]." Alex Denney of NME felt that the album "isn't quite the home run it should have been, chiefly because the songwriting can't always keep pace with the band's vaulting ambition", but wrote that "when they get it right—'Let Go' is precisely the sort of arthouse R&B blockbuster they could've done with more of—they flirt with perfection." Zander Porter of Consequence of Sound described Nabuma Rubberband as "Little Dragon's selfish record, and splendidly so. Some of the sweet moments in its strongest tracks, however, are lost in others, as is the nature of an album with standout tracks. Even yet, Little Dragon ended Nabuma on a note of tastefulness that shows their confidence has been a positive development." Pitchfork's Harley Brown found that the album's "slow jams are perfectly sexy, but they lack originality", while remarking, "It's great the band was able to find a throughline between the comfortable and the experimental this time around, but on Nabuma Rubberband they let go of a little too much of themselves in the process." Uncut's Sam Richards commented that "the likes of 'Mirror' and 'Paris' are melodically and emotionally direct but with plenty going on beneath the surface, while the restrained tempos serve to show off Nagano's nicely maturing voice." Richards continued, "There's nothing here that is likely to offend or amaze but it's a classy affair from start to finish." Kitty Empire of The Observer viewed the album as "another fine entry into [the band's] parallel universe", but felt that "[i]t's not the break-out record that they might have gone for".

== Commercial performance ==
Nabuma Rubberband debuted at number 14 on the UK Albums Chart with first-week sales of 4,203 copies, becoming Little Dragon's highest-peaking album on the chart to date.

== Track listing ==
All tracks are written by Little Dragon, except where noted.

No.	Title	Writer(s)	Length
1.	"Mirror"	Little Dragon, Dave Jolicoeur	3:25
2.	"Klapp Klapp"		3:37
3.	"Pretty Girls"		3:43
4.	"Underbart"		4:05
5.	"Cat Rider"		4:33
6.	"Paris"		3:24
7.	"Lurad"		0:08
8.	"Nabuma Rubberband"		3:15
9.	"Only One"		4:06
10.	"Killing Me"	Little Dragon, Jolicoeur	3:44
11.	"Pink Cloud"		4:46
12.	"Let Go"		4:04

Japanese edition bonus tracks
No.	Title	Length
13.	"Winners"	3:33
14.	"Klapp Klapp" (Girl Unit Remix)	4:27
15.	"Paris" (The Flexican Remix)	4:23

== Personnel ==
Credits adapted from the liner notes of Nabuma Rubberband.

- Little Dragon – production
- Robin Hannibal – production on "Killing Me" and "Let Go"
- Jaycen Joshua – mixing
- Ryan Kaul – mixing assistance
- Dave Kutch – mastering
- Li Wei – cover image
- Matt de Jong – design

== Charts ==
=== Weekly charts ===
Chart (2014)	Peak position
Australian Albums (ARIA)	44
Australian Dance Albums (ARIA)	6
Belgian Albums (Ultratop Flanders)	125
Belgian Albums (Ultratop Wallonia)	145
French Albums (SNEP)	118
Irish Albums (IRMA)	84
Irish Independent Albums (IRMA)	15
New Zealand Albums (RMNZ)	33
Scottish Albums (OCC)	46
Swiss Albums (Schweizer Hitparade)	61
UK Albums (OCC)	14
UK Independent Albums (OCC)	1
US Billboard 200	24
US Top Alternative Albums (Billboard)	5
US Top Dance Albums (Billboard)	2

=== Year-end charts ===
Chart (2014)	Position
Australian Dance Albums (ARIA)	50

== Release history ==
Region	Date	Format	Label	Ref.
Australia	9 May 2014	CD; digital download	Warner	
Germany	9 May 2014	CD; digital download	Warner	
France	12 May 2014	CD; LP + CD; digital download	Because	
Sweden	12 May 2014	Digital download	Because	
United Kingdom	12 May 2014	CD; LP; digital download	Because	
United States	13 May 2014	CD; LP	Loma Vista; Republic	
United States	13 May 2014	Digital download	Seven Four Entertainment; Republic	
Germany	20 May 2014	LP	Warner	
Sweden	28 May 2014	CD	Because	
Australia	6 June 2014	LP	Warner	
Sweden	11 June 2014	LP	Because	
Japan	23 July 2014	CD; digital download	Warner	
