= Waltz for Koop =

Studio album by Koop
- Released: 21 Nov 2001
- Genre: Electronic; acid jazz; downtempo
- Length: 34:52
- Label: Sony Music Entertainment (Sweden) 505426 2
- Producer: Oscar Simonsson; Magnus Zingmark

Koop chronology
Sons of Koop (1997)	Waltz for Koop (2001)	Koop Islands (2006)

Professional ratings
Review scores
Source	Rating
Allmusic	4.5/5 stars
PopMatters	(not rated)

Waltz for Koop is the second studio album by the Swedish electronic music duo Koop. It was their first album to hit a U.S. Billboard chart, peaking at number seventeen on Top Electronic Albums. The compositions were recorded and mixed by Mats "Limpan" Lindfors. Two years after its release, a remix album was issued with the title Waltz for Koop: Alternative Takes.

== Track listing ==
No.	Title	Writer(s)	Length
1.	"Waltz for Koop" (featuring Cecilia Stalin)	Oscar Simonsson; Magnus Zingmark	3:06
2.	"Tonight" (featuring Mikael Sundin)	Simonsson; Zingmark	2:54
3.	"Baby" (featuring Cecilia Stalin)	Simonsson; Zingmark	3:47
4.	"Summer Sun" (featuring Yukimi Nagano)	Simonsson; Zingmark	3:47
5.	"Soul for Sahib"	Simonsson; Zingmark	3:37
6.	"Modal Mile" (featuring Earl Zinger)	Simonsson; Earl Zinger; Zingmark	4:21
7.	"In a Heartbeat" (featuring Terry Callier)	Terry Callier; Simonsson; Zingmark	5:10
8.	"Relaxin' at Club Fusion"	Simonsson; Zingmark	4:15
9.	"Bright Nights" (featuring Yukimi Nagano)	Simonsson; Zingmark	3:55
Total length:			34:52

== Credits ==
- Bass – Dan Berglund (tracks: 1 2 4 5 6 7 8 9)
- Bongos – Ola Bothzén
- Engineer (co-engineered) – Limpan
- Flute, brass (reeds) – Magnus Lindgren
- Mastered by – Bo Kondren
- Producer, written by – Magnus Zingmark, Oscar Simonsson
- Recorded by, mixed by – Koop
- Vibraphone – Mattias Ståhl

== Sales ==
Region	Certification	Certified units/sales
Italy	—	18,000
United States	—	44,000
Summaries
Worldwide	—	160,000

== Legacy ==
- "Summer Sun" is featured during a ballroom dance segment in the 2004 animated teen sitcom O'Grady.
- "Waltz for Koop" was featured in the theatrical trailer for the 2005 film Match Point.
