= Slugs of Love =

Studio album by Little Dragon
- Released: 7 July 2023
- Genre: R&B; trip hop
- Length: 41:34
- Label: Ninja Tune
- Producer: Little Dragon

Little Dragon chronology
New Me, Same Us (2020)	Slugs of Love (2023)

Singles from Slugs of Love
- 1. "Slugs of Love" Released: 5 April 2023; 2. "Kenneth" Released: 3 May 2023; 3. "Gold" Released: 24 May 2023; 4. "Tumbling Dice" Released: 21 June 2023

Slugs of Love is the seventh studio album by Swedish band Little Dragon, released through Ninja Tune on 7 July 2023. It includes collaborations with JID and Damon Albarn, and was preceded by the singles "Slugs of Love", "Kenneth", "Gold" and "Tumbling Dice". The band will tour North America and Europe in late 2023 in support of the album.

== Background ==
In a statement, the band said: "Together we have developed, replayed, danced to, cried and laughed to this music as it has evolved forwards, backwards, sideways and all around, but now finally as a complete masterpiece. This feels like our finest work yet. We are very proud."

== Critical reception ==
Professional ratings
Aggregate scores
Source	Rating
Metacritic	76/100
Review scores
Source	Rating
Clash	7/10
Exclaim!	7/10
MusicOMH	4/5 stars
Pitchfork	7.1/10

Slugs of Love received a score of 76 out of 100 on review aggregator Metacritic based on seven critics' reviews, indicating "generally favorable" reception. Uncut felt that "in a single sitting it can tend toward the soporific, but there's unforced sweetness in this groovy drifting off". Clash's Maddy Smith described it as "a relaxed and dreamy blend of R&B and trip-hop" that "serves as a gentle and beautiful reminder of the importance and strength of minimalism". Emilie Richardson-Dupuis of Exclaim! stated that Slugs of Love "certainly proves that Little Dragon have a lot left to give" and the album "finds Little Dragon allowing themselves to be playful—a welcome place for this group". Ben Hogwood, reviewing the album for MusicOMH called it "an upfront experience from beginning to end. Here is an airy album not afraid to fully let itself go and experiment, rarely holding back, and encouraging flights of fancy". Eric Torres of Pitchfork remarked that the album "glows with carefree, mosaic pop arrangements" and Little Dragon "sound looser and freer than ever".

== Track listing ==
All lyrics and music written by Erik Bodin, Yukimi Nagano, Fredrik Wallin, and Håkan Wirenstrand, except where noted.

Slugs of Love track listing
No.	Title	Lyrics	Music	Length
1.	"Amöban"			3:15
2.	"Frisco"			3:42
3.	"Slugs of Love"			4:07
4.	"Disco Dangerous"			2:46
5.	"Lily's Call"			4:04
6.	"Stay" (featuring JID)	Bodin; Nagano; Wallin; Wirenstrand; Destin Route	Bodin; Wallin; Wirenstrand	3:48
7.	"Gold"	Bodin; Nagano; Wallin; Wirenstrand; Durand Bernarr	Bodin; Nagano; Wallin; Wirenstrand; Bernarr	3:12
8.	"Kenneth"			3:49
9.	"Glow" (featuring Damon Albarn)	Bodin; Nagano; Wallin; Wirenstrand; Damon Albarn	Bodin; Nagano; Wallin; Wirenstrand; Albarn	6:00
10.	"Tumbling Dice"			2:55
11.	"Easy Falling"			3:56
Total length:				41:34

== Personnel ==
Little Dragon

- Yukimi Nagano – production
- Erik Bodin – production
- Fredrik Wallin – production
- Håkan Wirenstrand – production

Additional contributors

- Max Gilkes – mastering
- Dilip Harris – mixing
- Sam Egglenton – engineering
- Alice Winroth – graphic design
- Yusuke Nagano – paintings
- Jakob Ekvall – photography
- JID – vocals on "Stay"
- Damon Albarn – vocals and synthesizer on "Glow"

== Charts ==
Chart performance for Slugs of Love
Chart (2023)	Peak position
UK Album Downloads (OCC)	62
UK Independent Albums (OCC)	26
