= Coup de Grâce (Best of Koop 1997–2007) =

2010 compilation album by Koop

Greatest hits album by Koop
- Released: 2010
- Genre: Electronic; jazz; downtempo
- Label: !K7

Koop chronology
Koop Islands (2006)	Coup de Grâce (Best of Koop 1997–2007) (2010)

Coup de Grâce (Best of Koop 1997–2007) is a 'best of' compilation album by electronic music duo Koop. The album comprises a selection of songs taken from the band's previous three albums. It also includes the unreleased song "Strange Love".

== Track listing ==
1. "Koop Island Blues"
2. "Waltz for Koop"
3. "Come to Me"
4. "Forces... Darling"
5. "Summer Sun"
6. "Let's Elope"
7. "Tonight"
8. "Strange Love"
9. "Glomd"
10. "Baby"
11. "I See a Different You"

== Notes ==
- Song "Strange Love" is available on the North American release of "Koop Islands". This is the first time it has been available on an album in Europe.
