= New Me, Same Us =

Studio album by Little Dragon
- Released: 27 March 2020
- Recorded: Gothenburg, Sweden
- Label: Ninja Tune
- Producer: Little Dragon

Little Dragon chronology
Season High (2017)	New Me, Same Us (2020)	Slugs of Love (2023)

Singles from New Me, Same Us
- 1. "Hold On" Released: 28 January 2020; 2. "Are You Feeling Sad?" Released: 4 March 2020

New Me, Same Us is the sixth studio album by Swedish electronic music band Little Dragon. It was released on 27 March 2020.

== Background ==
The album is their first release through a new record deal with label Ninja Tune.

== Singles ==
"Hold On" was the first single to be released from the album, with a remixed version of the track by Poté released on 28 January 2020. The second single from the album, "Are You Feeling Sad?", featuring Kali Uchis, was released on 4 March 2020.

== Critical reception ==
Professional ratings
Aggregate scores
Source	Rating
AnyDecentMusic?	7.2/10
Metacritic	73/100
Review scores
Source	Rating
AllMusic	4/5 stars
Exclaim!	8/10
The Line of Best Fit	8/10
Mojo	4/5 stars
MusicOMH	3/5 stars
Paste	7.5/10
Pitchfork	7.0/10
Q	3/5 stars
The Skinny	3/5 stars
Uncut	3/5 stars

The album received generally favourable reviews upon its release.

== Promotion ==
The band first released a new track called "Tongue Kissing" in November 2019 and confirmed a tour of Europe, Canada and US to take place from March 2020. However, by early spring 2020 the tour had to be postponed due to the outbreak of COVID-19 across Europe and North America. Despite the postponement of these dates, the band confirmed further tour dates for Europe in autumn 2020. Upon the release of the album on 27 March 2020, the band performed a special live show on YouTube from Gothenburg, Sweden.

== Track listing ==
New Me, Same Us track listing
No.	Title	Length
1.	"Hold On"	3:30
2.	"Rush"	3:29
3.	"Another Lover"	4:26
4.	"Kids"	4:31
5.	"Every Rain"	4:24
6.	"New Fiction"	4:19
7.	"Sadness"	3:28
8.	"Are You Feeling Sad?"	2:37
9.	"Where You Belong"	3:27
10.	"Stay Right Here"	6:15
11.	"Water"	4:15

== Charts ==
Chart performance for New Me, Same Us
Chart (2020)	Peak position
US Top Album Sales (Billboard)	55
US Top Dance Albums (Billboard)	5
