= Sons of Koop =

Studio album by Koop
- Released: July 21, 1997
- Genre: Jazz, electronic
- Length: 44:40
- Label: Superstudio Grå

Koop chronology
Sons of Koop (1997)	Waltz for Koop (2001)

Sons of Koop is the debut studio album by Swedish electronic jazz group Koop. It was released on July 21, 1997 via Super Records

== Track listing ==
1. "Introduktion" – 1:46
2. "Glömd" – 4:50
3. "Psalm" – 4:37
4. "Bjarne Riis" – 2:43
5. "Absolute Space" – 5:05
6. "Words of Tranquility" – 5:13
7. "Salvation" – 5:04
8. "Jellyfishes" – 6:51
9. "Once Britten" – 4:06
10. "Hellsbells" – 4:03

== Credits ==
- Artwork by (cover) – Acne & Bisse
- Mastered by – Kaj Erixon
- Mixed by – Kaj Erixon, Koop
- Written by, producer – Koop
