= Season High =

Studio album by Little Dragon
- Released: 14 April 2017
- Recorded: Gothenburg, Sweden
- Genre: Experimental pop
- Length: 43:09
- Label: Because
- Producer: Little Dragon

Little Dragon chronology
Nabuma Rubberband (2014)	Season High (2017)	New Me, Same Us (2020)

Singles from Season High
- 1. "High" Released: 16 February 2017; 2. "Sweet" Released: 8 March 2017; 3. "Celebrate" Released: April 27, 2017; 4. "Strobe Light" Released: July 19, 2017

Professional ratings
Aggregate scores
Source	Rating
AnyDecentMusic?	6.5/10
Metacritic	67/100
Review scores
Source	Rating
AllMusic	2.5/5 stars
The A.V. Club	B−
The Guardian	3/5 stars
The Independent	3/5 stars
Mixmag	9/10
Mojo	4/5 stars
NME	4/5 stars
Pitchfork	5.6/10
Q	3/5 stars
The Times	4/5 stars

Season High is the fifth studio album by Swedish electronic music band Little Dragon, released on 14 April 2017 by Because Music. The song "High" was released as the first single.

== Singles ==
"High" was released on 14 February 2017 as the album's lead single. The accompanying music video debuted on YouTube a day prior the single release.

A music video for the song "Sweet" was released on 8 March 2017.

A version of "High", remixed by Michael Uzowuru and Jeff Kleinman and featuring Denzel Curry and Twelve'len, was released on 4 April 2017.

== Track listing ==
All tracks are written by Little Dragon

No.	Title	Length
1.	"Celebrate" (featuring Agge)	3:56
2.	"High"	4:16
3.	"The Pop Life"	3:37
4.	"Sweet"	3:31
5.	"Butterflies"	6:06
6.	"Should I"	2:58
7.	"Don't Cry"	4:14
8.	"Strobe Light"	3:43
9.	"Push"	3:06
10.	"Gravity"	7:38

== Personnel ==
Little Dragon

- Yukimi Nagano – vocals, production, cover image
- Fredrik Wallin – bass, keyboards, production, cover image
- Håkan Wirenstrand – keyboards, production, cover image
- Erik Bodin – drums, keyboards, production, cover image

Additional personnel

- James Ford – additional production, mixing
- Joe LaPorta – mastering
- Ibrahim Kamara – artwork
- Matt de Jong – design, layout

== Charts ==
Chart (2017)	Peak position
New Zealand Heatseeker Albums (RMNZ)	3
US Billboard 200	173
US Top Alternative Albums (Billboard)	20
US Top Dance/Electronic Albums (Billboard)	5
