= Koop (band) =

Swedish electronic jazz duo

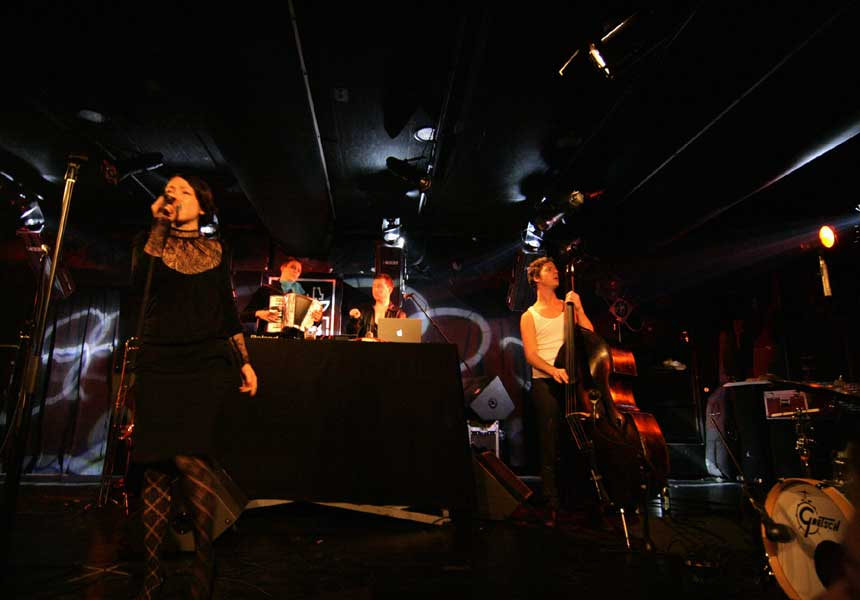
- Koop

Background information
- Origin: Uppsala, Sweden
- Genres: Electronica; jazz; chill-out; acid jazz; nu jazz; lounge
- Years active: 1995–2008
- Labels: Playground Music Scandinavia; !K7; Atlantic
- Past members: Oscar Simonsson; Magnus Zingmark

Koop was an electronic jazz duo from Sweden, consisting of Magnus Zingmark and Oscar Simonsson. Their music consists of mostly vocal jazz created by putting together thousands of different song samples and has been described as a blend between 1960s jazz, swing and Caribbean music.

Koop ended their collaboration in 2008, with Simonsson continuing to compose and tour under the name Koop Oscar Orchestra.

== History ==
Zingmark and Simonsson met while attending university in Uppsala and formed the band in 1995, before moving to Stockholm. According to Simonsson, his passion for the genre came about by growing up in a house where jazz was frequently played, with his father playing jazz drums in his youth. The name Koop is a shortened version of a Swedish word meaning "cooperation".

Koop released their first album, Sons of Koop, in 1997, which featured a sound that made heavy use of loops and a more electronic direction than their future releases.

In 2001, they released their second album, Waltz for Koop, which won a Swedish Grammy Award two years later for "Best Club/Dance Album".

Their biggest success came in 2006 with the album Koop Islands, which was certified Gold in Sweden. Described as "supremely melodic" by The Washington Post, the album received an expanded release in the United States the following year, further increasing the band's exposure.

Despite announcing work on a new album, Koop broke up in late 2008, playing their last show at Sala Palatului in Bucharest. In a later blog post, Simonsson explained that the Bucharest show felt like it "could be a perfect ending", but also that non-musical interests, such as children, began to increasingly come into play.

=== Koop Oscar Orchestra ===
In 2015, Oscar Simonsson formed a successor band called the Koop Oscar Orchestra, co-opting Lithuanian singer Jazzu. In 2015 KOO played its first concert, in Italy, and in 2018 they played a gig at the Koktebel Jazz Festival.

== Style ==
Their orchestrated sound is achieved by slowly putting together thousands of small clips from records until the songs are ready. Their live shows are a combination of a live band and pre-recorded samples. Their music takes inspiration from 1930s swing, 1960s jazz, Big Band, classical vocal jazz, Caribbean rhythms and even hip-hop. The duo occasionally used the term "swingtronica" to refer to their music.

Vocals have been provided by singers such as Ane Brun, Yukimi Nagano, Hilde Louise Asbjørnsen, Rob Gallagher, Cecilia Stalin and Mikael Sundin.

== In popular culture ==
In 2007, their most successful song, "Koop Island Blues" was featured in a trailer for the videogame World in Conflict called "Destruction Blues". It was later featured as the loading screen music in game.

In 2008, "Koop Island Blues" was featured in the fifth episode of the television show Breaking Bad titled "Gray Matter".

In 2009, it made its return in World in Conflict: Soviet Assault trailer called "Destruction Blues II".

In 2009, "Koop Island Blues" was featured in American TV show So You Think You Can Dance. The song "Strange Love" was also featured in a commercial for Coca-Cola. That same year, "Koop Island Blues" was featured as the intro music for the 2009 video game The Saboteur.

Turkish television channel TV8 use "Koop Island Blues" in commercial breaks.

In 2022, Koop Island Blues, appeared in the 4° episode of the Italian TV series Everything Calls for Salvation broadcast on Netflix.

== Discography ==
- Sons of Koop, 1997
- Waltz for Koop, 2001
- Koop Islands, 2006
- Coup de Grâce (Best of Koop 1997–2007), 2010

== Also appear on ==
- Beginner's Guide to Scandinavia, 2011 (Nascente/Demon Music Group)
