= Yukimi Nagano =

Japanese-Swedish singer and musician (born 1982)

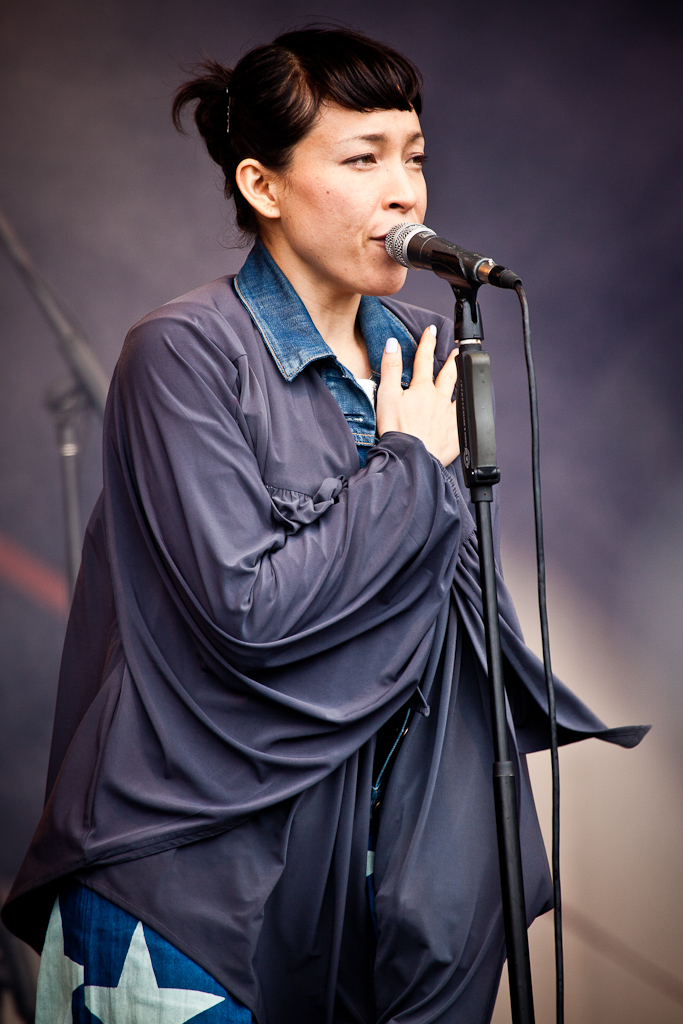
- Nagano performing with Little Dragon at Parklife festival in Sydney, October 2011

Background information
- Born: Yukimi Eleanora Nagano; 31 January 1982 (age 44); Gothenburg, Sweden
- Genres: Dance; synth-pop; electronica; soul; jazz; chill-out
- Occupations: Singer; songwriter
- Instruments: Vocals; percussion; drums
- Years active: 1996–present
- Member of: Little Dragon
- Website: little-dragon.net

Yukimi Eleanora Nagano (born 31 January 1982), sometimes known mononymously as Yukimi, is a Swedish singer and songwriter. She is the vocalist for the Swedish electronic group Little Dragon.

== Career ==
=== Early career ===
Nagano first made a record at the age of 18 with Andreas Saag (Swell Session). She then worked with Swedish nu jazz duo Koop on the songs "Summer Sun" and "Bright Nights" (both from 2001's Waltz for Koop) and joined the duo on tour, which she says "opened a lot of doors for me both life and collaboration wise". She collaborated with Koop again on "Come to Me", "I See a Different You", and "Whenever There Is You" for the 2006 release Koop Islands. Nagano also contributed significant vocal work to the 2004 album Moving On by Hird, including the song "Keep You Kimi" and the title track "Moving On".

=== Little Dragon ===
Nagano is the vocalist of Gothenburg-based electronic band Little Dragon, which she established with her close high school friends Erik Bodin (drums) and Fredrik Wallin (bass) in 1996 while they were in high school. Håkan Wirenstrand (keyboards) joined the group later. Nagano and her bandmates each applied to music college but were denied entrance, and instead continued to make music together while working side jobs. In 2007, Little Dragon released their first single, "Twice", which led to the group being signed to the record label Peacefrog Records. The band released their self-titled debut album on September 3, 2007, to favorable reception. This was followed by Machine Dreams in 2009.

Little Dragon was featured on Gorillaz's 2010 album Plastic Beach on the songs "Empire Ants" and "To Binge", both of which Nagano co-wrote, and she performed in the "Escape to Plastic Beach Tour" the same year.

Little Dragon's third studio album, Ritual Union, was released in July 2011 and the band went on tour in North America, Europe, and Australia. The band's fourth studio album, Nabuma Rubberband, was released in May 2014 in the United Kingdom via Because Music and in the United States via Loma Vista Recordings. It received a nomination for Best Dance/Electronic Album at the 57th Annual Grammy Awards. The album was supported by tours in Europe and North America.

In 2015, Nagano was featured, along with Little Dragon, on electronic music duo ODESZA's 2015 single "Light". Also in 2015, Nagano and Little Dragon were featured on Mac Miller's album GO:OD AM on the last track, titled "The Festival".

In 2016, Little Dragon collaborated with De La Soul on the track "Drawn", and a music video for the song was released in 2017. Season High, Little Dragon's fifth studio album, was also released in 2017.

=== Other collaborations ===
She and Erik Bodin have played live with fellow Gothenburg artist, José González.

In 2011, Nagano was featured on SBTRKT's eponymous debut album with her vocals on the song "Wildfire". She is also featured on Raphael Saadiq's 2011 album Stone Rollin' on the song "Just Don't".

She also provided vocals for "Scale It Back" on DJ Shadow's 2011 album The Less You Know, the Better and for "Descending", "Higher Res", and "Thom Pettie" from Big Boi's 2012 album Vicious Lies and Dangerous Rumors. Nagano additionally co-wrote "Mama Told Me" and sang on the song's original version.

=== Solo work ===
Nagano, using the mononym Yukimi, released her debut solo album, For You, on March 28, 2025.

== Personal life ==
Nagano was born and raised in Gothenburg, Sweden, to Japanese father Yusuke Nagano and Swedish-American mother Joanne Brown. She has a son, Jaxon, who was born in 2016. Nagano's sister is the musician Sandra Sumie Nagano, whose eponymous album was released by Bella Union in December 2013.
