= Little Dragon =

Swedish electronic band

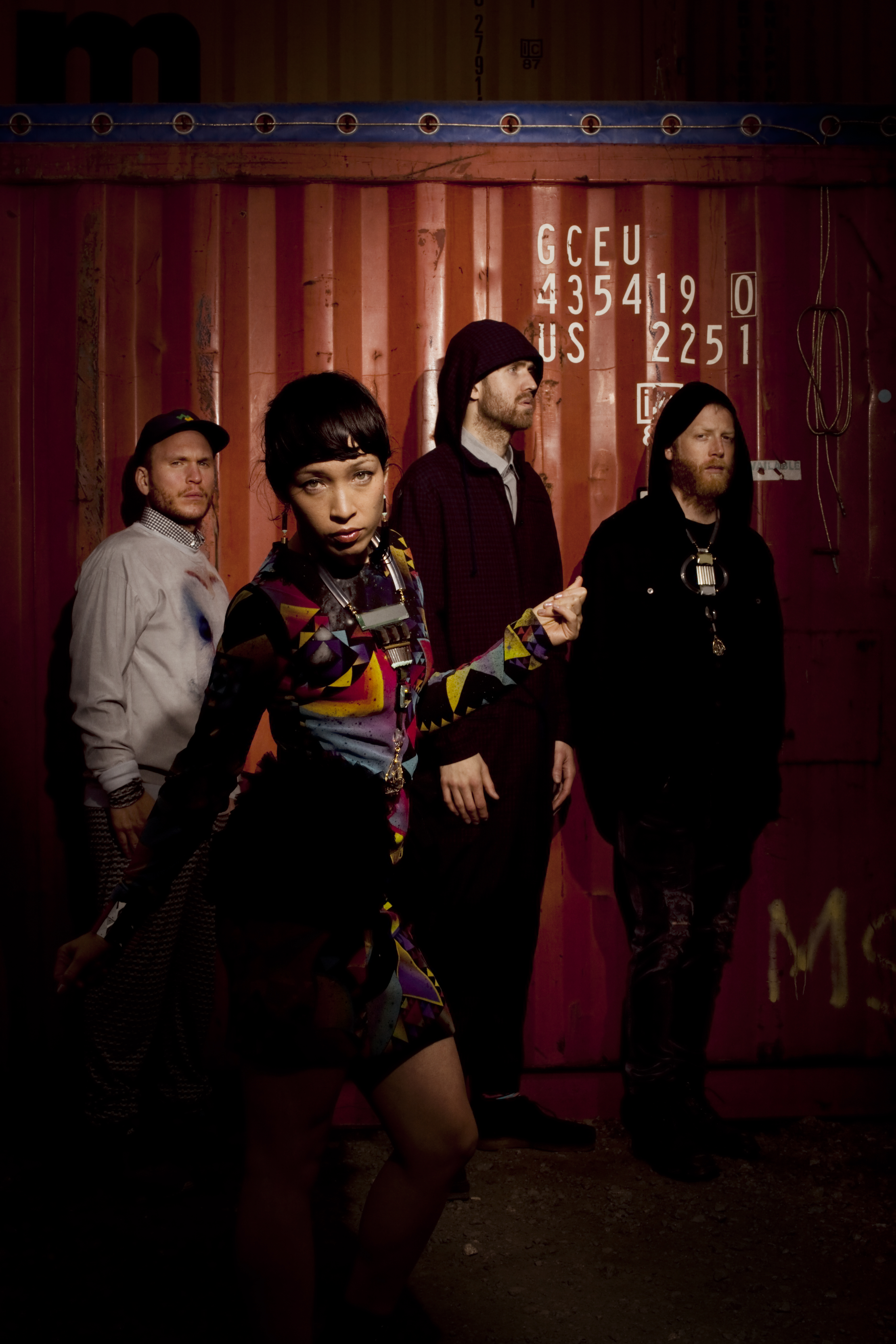
- Little Dragon in 2010. From left to right: Erik Bodin, Yukimi Nagano, Fredrik Wallin, Håkan Wirenstrand

Background information
- Origin: Gothenburg, Sweden
- Genres: Trip hop; downtempo; synth-pop; electro-indie; dream pop; soul; alternative R&B
- Years active: 1996–present
- Labels: Off the Wall; Peacefrog; JVC Victor; Because; Loma Vista; Republic; Ninja Tune
- Members: Yukimi Nagano; Erik Bodin; Fredrik Wallin; Håkan Wirenstrand
- Website: little-dragon.net

Little Dragon are a Swedish electronic music band from Gothenburg, Sweden, formed in 1996. The band consists of Yukimi Nagano (vocals, percussion), Erik Bodin (drums), Fredrik Wallin (bass) and Håkan Wirenstrand (keyboards).

Little Dragon's first release was the double A-side seven-inch vinyl single "Test"/"4ever", released on the Off the Wall label in 2006. The following year, the band signed with the larger British independent label Peacefrog Records and released their debut album Little Dragon in August 2007. Their second album, Machine Dreams, was released in August 2009, and gathered favourable reviews. The third album, Ritual Union, was released in July 2011 and was ranked at number 41 on Rolling Stone list of the 50 Best Albums of 2011. Clash placed it at number 31 on its list of The Top 40 Albums of 2011.

The band's fourth studio album, Nabuma Rubberband, was released in May 2014 by Because Music and was met with critical acclaim. It received a nomination for Best Dance/Electronic Album at the 57th Annual Grammy Awards. The band's fifth studio album, Season High, was released on 14 April 2017. New Me, Same Us, the band's sixth studio album, was released on 27 March 2020. Their most recent album, Slugs of Love, was released on 7 July 2023.

== History ==
Little Dragon formed in 1996 in Gothenburg, Sweden. Yukimi Nagano was in her first year in high school when she met seniors Fredrik Wallin and Erik Bodin. The three of them would meet up after school to jam and play records by De La Soul, A Tribe Called Quest and Alice Coltrane. The band's name was inspired by the "Little Dragon" nickname Nagano earned due to the "fuming tantrums" she used to throw while recording in the studio. "It's a little exaggerated, but there is some truth in it", Nagano said. "But we've grown up a bit, and I realised you can't have a fit every day because otherwise you won't be able to stand each other."

Little Dragon have toured throughout Europe and has also made music videos for the songs "Test", "Twice", "Constant Surprises", "After the Rain" and "Fortune". The video for "Twice" was directed by award-winning Swedish filmmaker Johannes Nyholm. The double A-side single "Fortune"/"Blinking Pigs" was released in the UK on 26 January 2009.

Little Dragon were chosen as one of Beyond Race Magazine's "50 Emerging Artists" in late 2009, resulting in a spot in the publication's 11th issue as well as an exclusive online Q&A on the magazine's site. On the recommendation of his wife, Damon Albarn invited Nagano and her bandmates to feature on Gorillaz's 2010 album Plastic Beach, appearing on the tracks "Empire Ants" and "To Binge". Albarn then asked Little Dragon to join Gorillaz on their Escape to Plastic Beach Tour. In September 2011, former keyboardist Arild Werling rejoined the group on support keys during live performances.

Little Dragon's fourth studio album, Nabuma Rubberband, was released on 12 May 2014 in the United Kingdom via Because Music and on 13 May in the United States via Loma Vista Recordings. The album was inspired by Janet Jackson's slow jams. "Klapp Klapp" was released as the album's lead single. The second single, "Paris", debuted on Zane Lowe's BBC Radio 1 programme on 8 April 2014. Nabuma Rubberband received a nomination for Best Dance/Electronic Album at the 57th Annual Grammy Awards.

The band's fifth studio album, Season High, was released on 14 April 2017 by Loma Vista Recordings. It has spawned the singles "High" and "Sweet".

== Members ==
- Yukimi Nagano – vocals, percussion
- Fredrik Wallin – keyboards, synth, bass guitar
- Håkan Wirenstrand – keyboards
- Erik Bodin – drums

== Discography ==
=== Studio albums ===
List of studio albums, with selected chart positions
Title	Details	Peak chart positions									
Title	Details	SWE	AUS	BEL (FL)	IRE	FRA	NZ	SCO	SWI	UK	US
Little Dragon	Released: 15 August 2007; Label: Peacefrog; Formats: CD, LP, digital download	—	—	—	—	—	—	—	—	—	—
Machine Dreams	Released: 17 August 2009; Label: Peacefrog; Formats: CD, LP, digital download	—	— (Note: Machine Dreams did not enter the Australian ARIA Albums Chart but peaked at number five on the ARIA Hitseekers Chart.)	—	—	—	—	—	—	—	—
Ritual Union	Released: 21 July 2011; Label: Peacefrog; Formats: CD, LP, digital download	47	91	— (Note: Ritual Union did not enter the Ultratop 200 Albums chart, but peaked at number seven on the Flemish Heatseekers chart.)	—	—	—	61	—	22	78
Nabuma Rubberband	Released: 9 May 2014; Label: Because; Formats: CD, LP, digital download	—	44	125	84	118	33	46	61	14	24
Season High	Released: 14 April 2017; Label: Because; Formats: CD, LP, digital download	—	—	—	—	—	— (Note: Season High did not enter the NZ Top 40 Albums Chart, but peaked at number three on the NZ Heatseekers Singles Chart.)	—	—	— (Note: Season High did not enter the UK Albums Chart, but peaked at number 71 on the UK Album Sales Chart.)	173
New Me, Same Us	Released: 27 March 2020; Label: Ninja Tune; Formats: CD, LP, digital download	—	—	—	—	—	—	—	—	— (Note: New Me, Same Us did not enter the UK Albums Chart, but peaked at number 37 on the UK Album Sales Chart.)	— (Note: New Me, Same Us did not enter the Billboard 200, but peaked at number 55 on the Top Album Sales chart.)
Slugs of Love	Released: 7 July 2023; Label: Ninja Tune; Formats: CD, LP, digital download	—	—	—	—	—	—	—	—	— (Note: Slugs of Love did not enter the UK Albums Chart, but peaked at number 88 on the UK Album Sales Chart.)	—
"—" denotes a recording that did not chart or was not released in that territory.

=== Remix albums ===
- Nabuma Purple Rubberband (2015)
- New Me, Same Us Remix (2021)

=== Compilation albums ===
- Best Of (2014)

=== Extended plays ===
- Twice Remix EP (2008)
- Blinking Pigs (2010)
- Ritual Union EP (2011)
- Little Man EP (2011)
- Amazon Artist Lounge (2014)
- Klapp Klapp / Paris Remixes (2014)
- Lover Chanting (2018)
- Drifting Out (2021)
- Opening the Door (2022)
- Slipping Into Color (with April + Vista) (2023)

=== Singles ===
==== As lead artist ====
List of singles, with selected chart positions, showing year released and album name
Title	Year	Peak chart positions								Album
Title	Year	AUS Hit.	BEL (FL) Tip	FRA	MEX	UK	UK Indie	US Bub.	US Dance/ Elec.	Album
"Test"/"4ever"	2006	—	—	—	—	—	—	—	—	Little Dragon
"Twice"/"Test"	2007	—	—	—	—	—	—	—	—	Little Dragon
"Constant Surprises"/"Scribbled Paper"	2007	—	—	—	—	—	—	—	—	Little Dragon
"Recommendation"	2008	—	—	—	—	—	—	—	—	Little Dragon
"Fortune"/"Blinking Pigs"	2009	—	—	—	—	—	25	—	—	Machine Dreams
"Feather"/"Stranger"	2009	—	—	—	—	—	—	—	—	Machine Dreams
"My Step"	2009	—	—	—	—	—	—	—	—	Machine Dreams
"Runabout"	2010	—	—	—	—	—	—	—	—	Machine Dreams
"Nightlight"	2011	—	—	—	—	—	—	—	—	Ritual Union
"Ritual Union"	2011	16	22	—	26	76	7	12	— (Note: "Ritual Union" did not enter the Hot Dance/Electronic Songs chart, but peaked at number 11 on the Dance/Electronic Digital Song Sales chart.)	Ritual Union
"Little Man"	2011	—	—	—	—	—	—	—	—	Ritual Union
"Sunshine"	2012	—	—	—	—	—	—	—	—	Non-album single
"Klapp Klapp"	2014	—	—	—	45	— (Note: "Klapp Klapp" did not enter the UK Singles Chart, but peaked at number 73 on the UK Physical Singles Chart.)	—	—	—	Nabuma Rubberband
"Paris"	2014	—	—	—	36	—	—	—	—	Nabuma Rubberband
"Let Go"	2014	—	—	—	—	—	—	—	—	Nabuma Rubberband
"Pretty Girls"	2014	—	—	172	—	—	—	—	—	Nabuma Rubberband
"Pink Cloud"	2015	—	—	—	—	— (Note: "Pink Cloud" did not enter the UK Singles Chart, but peaked at number 88 on the UK Physical Singles Chart.)	—	—	—	Nabuma Rubberband
"High"	2017	—	—	—	—	—	—	—	—	Season High
"Sweet"	2017	—	—	—	—	—	—	—	—	Season High
"Peace of Mind" (featuring Faith Evans)	2017	—	— (Note: "Peace of Mind" did not enter the Flanders Ultratop 50, but charted as an "extra tip" on the Ultratip chart.)	—	—	—	—	—	—	Non-album singles
"Sway Daisy"	2018	—	—	—	—	—	—	—	—	Non-album singles
"Best Friends"	2018	—	—	—	—	—	—	—	—	Non-album singles
"Tried" (with BadBadNotGood)	2018	—	— (Note: "Tried" did not enter the Flanders Ultratop 50, but charted as an "extra tip" on the Ultratip chart.)	—	—	—	—	—	—	Non-album singles
"Lover Chanting"	2018	—	— (Note: "Lover Chanting" did not enter the Flanders Ultratop 50, but charted as an "extra tip" on the Ultratip chart.)	—	—	— (Note: "Lover Chanting" did not enter the UK Singles Chart, but peaked at number 13 on the UK Physical Singles Chart.)	—	—	—	Lover Chanting EP
"Hold On"	2020	—	—	—	—	—	—	—	35	New Me, Same Us
"Are You Feeling Sad?" (featuring Kali Uchis)	2020	—	—	—	—	—	—	—	25	New Me, Same Us
"Where You Belong"	2020	—	—	—	—	—	—	—	33	New Me, Same Us
"The Other Lover" (with Moses Sumney)	2020	—	—	—	—	—	—	—	—	Non-album single
"—" denotes a recording that did not chart or was not released in that territory.

==== As featured artist ====
List of singles, with selected chart positions, showing year released and album name
Title	Year	Peak chart positions			Album
Title	Year	BEL (FL) Tip	MEX	US Dance	Album
"Empire Ants" (Gorillaz featuring Little Dragon)	2010	—	—	—	Plastic Beach
"Wildfire" (SBTRKT featuring Little Dragon)	2011	—	—	—	SBTRKT
"Scale It Back" (DJ Shadow featuring Little Dragon)	2011	43	28	—	The Less You Know, the Better
"Light" (Odesza featuring Little Dragon)	2015	—	—	—	In Return
"Bullets" (Kaytranada featuring Little Dragon)	2016	—	—	—	99.9%
"Spontaneous" (Flying Lotus featuring Little Dragon)	2019	—	—	50	Flamagra
"—" denotes a recording that did not chart or was not released in that territory.

=== Guest appearances ===
Title	Year	Other artist(s)	Album
"Empire Ants"	2010	Gorillaz	Plastic Beach
"To Binge"	2010	Gorillaz	Plastic Beach
"If You Return"	2010	Maximum Balloon	Maximum Balloon
"Thom Pettie"	2012	Big Boi, Killer Mike	Vicious Lies and Dangerous Rumors
"Descending"	2012	Big Boi	Vicious Lies and Dangerous Rumors
"Higher Res"	2012	Big Boi, Jai Paul	Vicious Lies and Dangerous Rumors
"Wanderer"	2015	None	Welcome to Los Santos
"The Festival"	2015	Mac Miller	GO:OD AM
"Mountains Have a Face Too"	2015	Billion One	Minerva
"Bullets"	2016	Kaytranada	99.9%
"Take a Chance"	2016	Flume	Skin
"Drawn"	2016	De La Soul	And the Anonymous Nobody...
"Stuck with Me"	2018	Tinashe	Joyride
"Pressure"	2019	Little Simz	GREY Area
"Spontaneous"	2019	Flying Lotus	Flamagra
"Presence"	2021	Brittany Howard	Jaime (Reimagined)

=== Music videos ===
Title	Year	Director	Ref.
"Twice"	2007	Johannes Nyholm	
"Test"	2007	Unknown	
"Constant Surprises"	2008	Fredrik Egerstrand	
"Fortune"	2008	Hideyuki Katsumata	
"Swimming"	2009	Yusuke Nagano	
"After the Rain"	2009	François Vogel	
"Runabout"	2009	Unknown	
"Looking Glass"	2009	Unknown	
"Never Never"	2010	Ulla Tomtom	
"My Step"	2011	Matthew Scheuerer	
"When I Go Out"	2011	Emanuele Kabu	
"Brush the Heat"	2011	Yusuke Nagano	
"Brush the Heat" (AVA remix)	2011	Eleanor Brown	
"Crystalfilm"	2012	Daniel Wirtberg	
"Sunshine"	2012	Dave Ma	
"Klapp Klapp"	2014	Taylor Cohen	
"Paris"	2014	Trevor Kane	
"Pretty Girls"	2014	Nabil	
"Underbart"	2014	Grant Singer	
"Mirror"	2015	Florian Joahn	
"High"	2017	Ossian Melin	
"Sweet"	2017	Ossian Melin	
"Celebrate" (featuring Agge)	2017	Ossian Melin	
"Strobe Light"	2017	Kristin-Lee Moolman	
"Peace of Mind" (featuring Faith Evans)	2017	Unknown	
"Lover Chanting"	2018	Jack Whiteley & Joe Wills	
"Where You Belong"	2020	Chris Saunders	
"Rush" (Lil Silva Remix)	2021	Timothy O’Driscoll	
"Frisco"	2022	Broken Int	
