= Little Dragon (album) =

Studio album by Little Dragon
- Released: 15 August 2007
- Recorded: 2005–2007
- Genre: Electropop; trip hop; electronica; R&B; soul
- Length: 50:33
- Label: Peacefrog

Little Dragon chronology
Little Dragon (2007)	Machine Dreams (2009)

Singles from Little Dragon
- 1. "Test"/"4ever" Released: 10 July 2006; 2. "Twice"/"Test" Released: 28 August 2007; 3. "Constant Surprises"/"Scribbled Paper" Released: 26 November 2007; 4. "Recommendation" Released: 14 July 2008

Professional ratings
Review scores
Source	Rating
AllMusic	4.5/5 stars

Little Dragon is the debut studio album by Swedish electronic music band Little Dragon. It was first released in Japan on 15 August 2007 by Village Again Records, and subsequently in the United Kingdom on 3 September 2007 by Peacefrog Records.

== Track listing ==
All tracks are written by Little Dragon

No.	Title	Length
1.	"Twice"	3:06
2.	"Turn Left"	4:05
3.	"No Love"	4:26
4.	"Recommendation"	3:52
5.	"Constant Surprises"	4:33
6.	"Forever"	4:31
7.	"After the Rain"	4:04
8.	"Place to Belong"	3:11
9.	"Stormy Weather"	4:27
10.	"Test"	4:28
11.	"Wink"	3:43
12.	"Scribbled Paper"	6:07
Total length:		50:33

Notes

- The Japanese edition includes the bonus track "Fortune" as track 3, between "Turn Left" and "Recommendation".

== Personnel ==
Credits adapted from the liner notes of Little Dragon.

Little Dragon

- Yukimi Nagano – vocals, percussion, keyboards
- Erik Bodin – drums, keyboards, vocals
- Fredrik Wallin – bass, keyboards, percussion
- Håkan Wirenstrand – keyboards, drums, vocals

Technical

- Pete Hutchison – mastering

Artwork

- Yusuke Nagano – illustrations, design

Additional musicians

- Kalle Ekström – saxophone (track 10)
- Jens Nilsson – saxophone (track 3)
- Björn Almgren – saxophone (track 3)
- Johan Arias – saxophone (track 3)
- Agge – guitar (track 3)

== Release history ==
Region	Date	Format	Label	Ref.
Japan	15 August 2007	CD	Village Again	
United Kingdom	27 August 2007	LP; digital download	Peacefrog	
United Kingdom	3 September 2007	CD	Peacefrog	
