= Machine Dreams =

Studio album by Little Dragon
- Released: 17 August 2009
- Recorded: 2007–2009 in Gothenburg, Sweden
- Genre: Synth-pop; dream pop; new wave
- Length: 43:52
- Label: Peacefrog
- Producer: Little Dragon

Little Dragon chronology
Little Dragon (2007)	Machine Dreams (2009)	Ritual Union (2011)

Singles from Machine Dreams
- 1. "Fortune"/"Blinking Pigs" Released: 26 January 2009; 2. "Feather"/"Stranger" Released: 9 July 2009; 3. "My Step"/"Looking Glass" Released: 10 August 2009; 4. "Runabout" Released: 7 June 2010

Machine Dreams is the second studio album by Swedish electronic music band Little Dragon. It was released on 17 August 2009 by Peacefrog Records.

== Composition ==
In making Machine Dreams, Little Dragon focused more on making uptempo dance tracks suited for live performances than on ballads like they did on their self-titled debut album. Vocalist Yukimi Nagano described the sound and style of Machine Dreams as more "anonymous" than the "naked" sound of their debut, being influenced by electronic and pop music. The album's title refers to its instrumentation and sound palette, which is a combination of organic and analog sounds with digitally produced sonic textures, "machines that sound human with humans playing machine-like parts" in the words of journalist Tim Chester. AllMusic reviewer Andy Kellman described the LP's instrumentation as consisting of "rubbery rhythms and liquid synthesizer patterns", while Patric Fallon of XLR8R compared it to the works of Prince, The Knife and Tom Tom Club.

== Cover art ==
Japanese artist Hideyuki Katsumata, whom the group met via Myspace, was responsible for making the cover art of Machine Dreams. Nagano explained, "We had a mutual respect for each other's work and we found that his expression really added something to our sound. We love him!"

== Critical reception ==
Professional ratings
Aggregate scores
Source	Rating
AnyDecentMusic?	6.5/10
Metacritic	74/100
Review scores
Source	Rating
AllMusic	4/5 stars
The Boston Phoenix	2.5/4 stars
Drowned in Sound	6/10
The Irish Times	3/5 stars
Mojo	4/5 stars
Pitchfork	7.7/10
PopMatters	7/10
Spin	7/10
URB	4.5/5 stars
XLR8R	7/10

Machine Dreams received generally positive reviews from music critics. At Metacritic, which assigns a normalised rating out of 100 to reviews from mainstream publications, the album received an average score of 74, based on 10 reviews.

Tim Chester of Wondering Sound viewed it as a "more refined version" of Little Dragon's debut album. Andy Kellman of AllMusic praised the album as an "[electric] quiet storm, deceptively intense and even sensual."

In a less enthusiastic review, Loud and Quiet critic Tom Goodwyn described Machines Dream as "slick, efficient pop music", writing that "each song flows beautifully into the next, driven by an equally infectious keyboard groove and comes in a perfect pop song length." However, he also criticized the record for not taking any chances, labeling the lyrical content as "throwaway" and overall calling the album "cold, vacuum packed and devoid of heart and soul."

== Track listing ==
All tracks are written by Little Dragon.

No.	Title	Length
1.	"A New"	4:02
2.	"Looking Glass"	4:55
3.	"My Step"	3:27
4.	"Feather"	4:53
5.	"Thunder Love"	3:54
6.	"Never Never"	3:37
7.	"Runabout"	4:22
8.	"Swimming"	3:38
9.	"Blinking Pigs"	3:39
10.	"Come Home"	4:13
11.	"Fortune"	3:12

European iTunes bonus track
No.	Title	Length
12.	"Tendencies"	4:06
Total length:		47:58

US iTunes bonus tracks
No.	Title	Length
12.	"Feather" (Dimman Remix)	6:55
13.	"My Step" (IndieAnimalJones Remix)	9:07
14.	"Runabout" (Zick Remix)	6:58
15.	"Swimming" (Zick Remix)	6:31
Total length:		65:23

== Personnel ==
Credits adapted from the liner notes of Machine Dreams.

- Little Dragon – production, mixing
- Guy Davie – mastering
- Dimman – backing vocals (track 4)
- Hideyuki Katsumata – illustration
- Harry Lindgård – mixing
- Petter Lindgård – mixing
- SEEK – photography
- La Skrocka – timbales (track 7)

== Release history ==
Region	Date	Format	Label	Ref.
United Kingdom	17 August 2009	LP; digital download	Peacefrog	
United Kingdom	31 August 2009	CD	Peacefrog	
Sweden	9 September 2009	CD; digital download	Peacefrog	
Germany	16 October 2009	CD; LP; digital download	Peacefrog	
Japan	28 October 2009	CD; digital download	Village Again	
United States	3 November 2009	CD; LP; digital download	Peacefrog	
Australia	26 November 2010	CD; digital download	EMI	
