= Mattias Ståhl =

Swedish jazz vibraphonist and composer (born 1971)

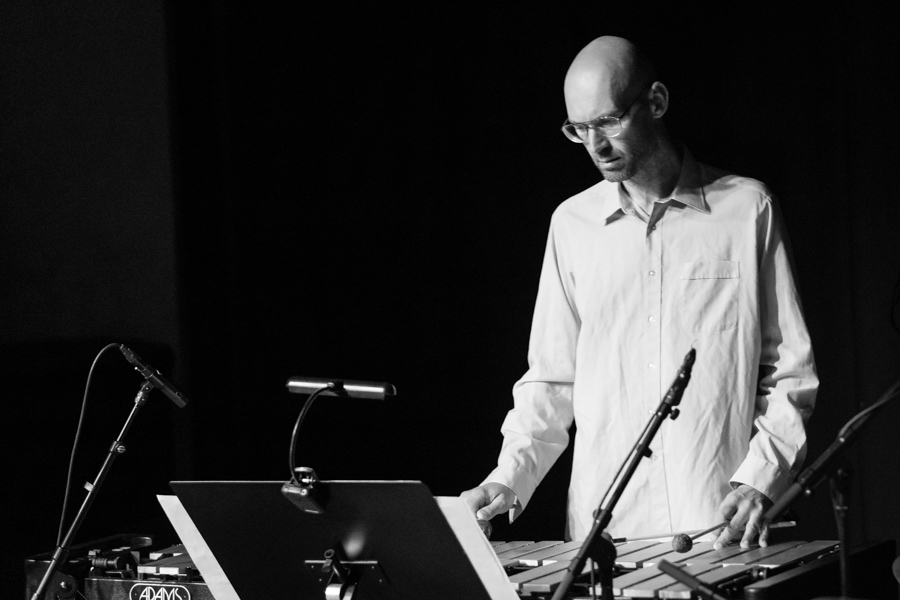
Mattias Ståhl performing in 2019

Mattias Ståhl (born 11 December 1971 in Oskarshamn, Sweden) is a Swedish jazz vibraphonist (also marimba, glockenspiel, clarinet, harmonica, synthesizer, percussion) and composer.

== Biography ==
Ståhl plays with Eirik Hegdal's Team Hegdal, Cecilia Persson, and the Trondheim Jazz Orchestra among others. He was involved in 33 jazz recording sessions between 1999 and 2012, including with Lennart Åberg, Bengt Berger, Fredrik Nordström, Lina Nyberg, Alberto Pinton and Per Tjernberg among others.

In 2001 he presented the trio album Ståhl's Blå, with Joakim Milder, Filip Augustson and Thomas Strønen. Since the beginning of the 2010s he has played in the band Angles, with Martin Kitchens, Magnus Broo, Mats Äleklint, Johan Berthling, Kjell Nordeson. He also formed a trio with bassist Joe Williamson and drummer Christopher Cantillo, for whom he also composes.

Ståhl resides in Stockholm.

== Honors ==
- 2002: Swedish Radio Award as Newcomer of the Year for the album Ståhls blå

== Discography ==
=== Solo albums ===
With Ståhls Blå (Joakim Milder, Håkon Kornstad, Filip Augustson, Thomas Strønen)

- 2001: Ståhls Blå (Dragon Records)
- 2004: Schlachtplatte (Moserobie Music Production)

With Ståhls Trio (Christopher Cantillo, Joe Williamson)

- 2014: Jag Skulle Bara Gå Ut (Moserobie Music Production)

=== Collaborations ===
With Berger, Knutsson, Spering, Bobo Stenson and special guest Mattias Ståhl

- 2001: Live Vol 2 - At Mosebacke (Amigo)

With Alberto Pinton Quintet (Jon Fält, Mats Äleklint, Torbjörn Zetterberg)

- 2004: The Visible (Moserobie Music Production)
- 2005: Motionemotion (Moserobie Music Production)
- 2007: Vita Pratica (Moserobie Music Production)

With Fredrik Nordström Quintet (Fredrik Nordström, Fredrik Rundqvist, Mats Äleklint, Torbjörn Zetterberg)

- 2004: Moment (Moserobie Music Production), with Filip Augustson, Magnus Broo
- 2005: No Sooner Said Than Done (Moserobie Music Production), with Ingebrigt Håker Flaten, Magnus Broo
- 2008: Live In Coimbra (Clean Feed)

With Sten Sandell/Mattias Ståhl

- 2007: Grann Musik (Neighbour Music) (Clean Feed Records)

With Klaus Holm Kollektif (Ole Morten Vågan, Ole Thomas Kolberg)

- 2007: What Was That You Said? (Jazzaway)

With Angles (Johan Berthling, Kjell Nordeson, Magnus Broo, Martin Küchen, Mats Äleklint)

- 2008: Every Woman is a Tree (Clean Feed)
- 2010: Epileptical West: Live In Coimbra (Clean Feed)

With Angles 8 (Goran Kajfes, Mats Äleklint, Martin Küchen, Eirik Hegdal, Alexander Zethson, Johan Berthling, Kjell Nordeson)

- 2011: By Way of Deception (Clean Feed)

With Två För Tommy (Fredrik Ljungkvist, Patric Thorman)

- 2012: Två För Tommy (Found You Recordings)

With Formo Tre & Metall

- 2013: Amor & Labor (Particular Recordings)

With Trondheim Jazz Orchestra & Eirik Hegdal

- 2013: Sidewalk Comedy (MNJ Records)

With Angles 9 (Alexander Zethson, Andreas Werliin, Eirik Hegdal, Goran Kajfes, Johan Berthling, Magnus Broo, Martin Küchen, Mats Äleklint)

- 2013: In Our Midst (Clean Feed)
- 2014: Injuries (Clean Feed)
- 2017: Disappeared Behind The Sun (Clean Feed)

With RED Trio & Mattias Ståhl

- 2014: North And The Red Stream (NoBusiness Records)
