= In Colour (Jamie xx album) =

Studio album by Jamie xx
- Released: 29 May 2015
- Recorded: 2012–2014
- Studios: Fortress, London; Marfa, Marfa, Texas ("Stranger in a Room")
- Genres: Electronic; house; future garage
- Length: 42:44
- Label: Young Turks
- Producers: Jamie xx, Four Tet

Jamie xx chronology
We're New Here (2011)	In Colour (2015)	In Waves (2024)

Singles from In Colour
- 1. "Girl"/"Sleep Sound" Released: 5 May 2014; 2. "Loud Places" Released: 27 March 2015; 3. "Gosh" Released: 4 May 2015; 4. "I Know There's Gonna Be (Good Times)" Released: 22 May 2015

In Colour is the debut studio album by English producer Jamie xx, released on 29 May 2015 by Young Turks. The album was composed during a five-year period while a member of the indie pop band the xx, starting with his production on xx in 2009. After starting his solo career with the remix album We're New Here (2011) and singles like "All Under One Roof Raving" (2014), he was intent on making the album something of a departure from his previous work and genre. The album features guest vocals from fellow the xx members Romy and Oliver Sim, as well as from Young Thug and Popcaan. The album produced five singles: "Girl" and "Sleep Sound" as a double-single on 5 May 2014, "Loud Places" on 27 March 2015, "Gosh" on 4 May, and "I Know There's Gonna Be (Good Times)" on 22 May.

In Colour received widespread acclaim from critics. It debuted at number three on the UK Albums Chart, selling 19,255 copies in its first week. In the United States, the album entered the Billboard 200 at number 21 and topped the Dance/Electronic Albums, with first-week sales of 19,000 copies. It was nominated for the 2015 Mercury Prize, MasterCard British Album of the Year at the 2016 Brit Awards and Best Dance/Electronic Album at the 58th Grammy Awards.

== Background and composition ==
Smith produced the xx's debut album, xx (2009), "by accident" after sessions with other producers including Diplo were unsuccessful. Later in 2009, Smith began his solo career when he remixed Florence and the Machine's "You've Got the Love". Smith was invited by XL Recordings owner Richard Russell to remix Gil Scott-Heron's 2010 album I'm New Here in its entirety. The resulting album, the electronic-based We're New Here, was released in 2011. He released his debut single, the double A-side "Far Nearer" / "Beat For" in June 2011. The following year, Smith used samples from We're New Here on Drake's "Take Care", which became a US top-10 hit. In Colour was announced on 23 March 2015.

The album was composed over five years, with Smith struggling to finish the music once he had started making it. Smith wanted to make an album that sounded like it did not come from any particular era. It is an electronica and dance record, blending styles of UK garage, house and rave. Smith used vocal samples from British media sources that he had encountered while away on tour. The vocal sample at the beginning of "Girl" is taken from an episode of the British drama television series Top Boy, and "Gosh" features a clip from a BBC Radio 1 programme called One in the Jungle that was never aired. "Seesaw" was recorded in collaboration with Kieran Hebden. "I Know There's Gonna Be (Good Times)" is based around a sample of The Persuasions' 1971 song "Good Times" from their album Street Corner Symphony, which Smith had bought in Detroit. The song features vocals by American rapper Young Thug and Jamaican musician Popcaan, which were recorded separately and spliced together by Smith.

== Promotion ==
=== Singles ===
The first single from the album, "Sleep Sound", premiered on 27 March 2014. A music video for "Sleep Sound", directed by Sofia Mattioli and featuring 13 members of the Manchester Deaf Centre, was released on 10 April 2014. The second single from the album, "Girl", was released on 18 April 2014. "Girl" and "Sleep Sound" were later released as a double A-side on 5 May 2014. On 25 March 2015, the tracks "Gosh" and "Loud Places" premiered on Annie Mac.

=== Music videos ===
On 27 March, a music video for "Loud Places", featuring Jamie xx and the xx bandmate Romy Madley Croft skateboarding at night in London, was released. On 27 April 2015, a music video for "Gosh" was released. On 11 May 2015, the song "I Know There's Gonna Be (Good Times)", featuring Young Thug and Popcaan, was released.

== Release ==
On 26 May 2015, In Colour was streamed in its entirety on iTunes. In Colour was released on 29 May 2015 in digital, CD, LP and a limited deluxe triple-LP edition. The deluxe edition of the album, cut on coloured vinyl, featured two exclusive instrumental tracks.

In 2016, it was awarded a gold certification from the Independent Music Companies Association, indicating sales of at least 75,000 copies throughout Europe.

== Critical reception ==
Professional ratings
Aggregate scores
Source	Rating
AnyDecentMusic?	8.2/10
Metacritic	87/100
Review scores
Source	Rating
AllMusic	5/5 stars
The A.V. Club	B
Financial Times	4/5 stars
The Guardian	4/5 stars
NME	9/10
Pitchfork	9.3/10
Q	5/5 stars
Rolling Stone	4/5 stars
Spin	9/10
Vice (Expert Witness)	A−

In Colour received widespread acclaim from critics. At Metacritic, which assigns a weighted mean rating out of 100 top reviews from mainstream publications, the album received an average score of 87, based on 39 reviews. Q magazine praised it as "an album so rich, complex and dazzlingly fluid" in a rave review, while Pitchfork's Mark Richardson called it a "dazzling culmination of Jamie xx's last six years of work, gathering up elements of everything he’s done—moody ballads, floor-filling bangers, expansive and off-kilter collaborations with vocalists—and packing them tightly into a glittering ball that reflects spinning fragments of feeling back at us." Nina Corcoran of Consequence of Sound gave the album a grade of A, writing "Each song grows richer the more you explore its open space. Its minimalism breathes buckets of color. After one listen or 10, In Colour reflects brightly, a phenomenally poised and universally approachable solo debut." In another positive review, Phil Hebblethwaite of NME wrote "[O]n an album defined by its creator making perfect choices, it fits, and you'd never know that Jamie cobbled ‘In Colour’ together on downtime over the last seven year." Gareth James of Clash called the album "an emotive, emphatic and often joyous collection of music that plays equally for the head and the heart." Robert Christgau wrote in Noisey that while the music functioned poorly as background music, listening to the record in the foreground left him captivated by the music's "glimmers of beat, snatches of melody, trick sounds, and fluctuating dynamics as well as the hooks with which most tracks are equipped and around which few are structured".

In a less enthusiastic review, Andrew Ryce from Resident Advisor remarks that In Colour is an "uneven album that's rarely as profound or as meaningful as it tries to be". In another mixed review, The Quietus's Christian Eede called the album "a collection of sexless, sonically conservative tracks overwrought in bass and nostalgia, and largely void of personality – club music for the neoliberal age."

== Accolades ==
The album was nominated for the 2015 Mercury Music Prize and Best Dance/Electronic Album at the 58th Grammy Awards.

In 2019, Pitchfork ranked the album at number 25 in their list of "The 200 Best Albums of the 2010s"; editor Puja Patel wrote: "In Colour was the result of [Jamie xx's] self-directed club education, a collection of influences—’90s jungle, swaggy doo-wop, the exaltation of trance, and the tension of two-step—that were reverent of the past but wary of nostalgia. It’s the sound of longing and loneliness mixed with the joyful relief of discovering that you've been among friends all along."

Year-end lists
Publication	Accolade	Rank	Ref.
Billboard	25 Best Albums of 2015	6	
Complex	Best Albums of 2015	15	
Consequence of Sound	Top 50 Albums of 2015	6	
Entertainment Weekly	The 40 Best Albums of 2015	4	
The Guardian	The Best Albums of 2015	17	
NME	NME's Albums of the Year 2015	3	
Pitchfork	The 50 Best Albums of 2015	2	
Pitchfork	Readers' Top 50 Albums	4	
Rough Trade	Albums of the Year 2015	10	
Stereogum	The 50 Best Albums of 2015	11	
Time	Top 10 Best Albums	9	
Vulture	The 10 Best Albums of 2015	2	

Decade-end lists
Publication	Accolade	Rank	Ref.
The A.V. Club	The 50 Best Albums of the 2010s	31	
Consequence of Sound	The 100 Top Albums of the 2010s	26	
NME	Greatest Albums of the 2010s	27	
Paste	The 100 Best Albums of the 2010s	56	
Pitchfork	The 200 Best Albums of the 2010s	25	
Rolling Stone	100 Best Albums of the 2010s	84	
Uproxx	100 Best Albums of the 2010s	51	

== Track listing ==
All tracks produced by Jamie Smith, except "SeeSaw", produced by Smith and Kieran Hebden.

No.	Title	Writer(s)	Length
1.	"Gosh"	Jamie Smith	4:51
2.	"Sleep Sound"	Smith; Taneisha Smith; Kerry Brothers; Alicia Augello-Cook; Bob Wright; Chett Forrest	3:52
3.	"SeeSaw" (featuring Romy)	J. Smith; Kieran Hebden; Romy Madley Croft; Peter Buffett; Mary Buffett; Jeff Mehl; Billy Guy; Sylvia Robinson	4:28
4.	"Obvs"	J. Smith; Haruko Mizoguchi; Hugh Masekela	3:51
5.	"Just Saying"	J. Smith	1:23
6.	"Stranger in a Room" (featuring Oliver Sim)	J. Smith; Oliver Sim; Croft	2:57
7.	"Hold Tight"	J. Smith	4:03
8.	"Loud Places" (featuring Romy)	J. Smith; Croft; Rick Nowels; Dave Matthews; Anthony Sarafino	4:43
9.	"I Know There's Gonna Be (Good Times)" (featuring Young Thug and Popcaan)	J. Smith; Andrae Jay Sutherland; Jeffery Lamar Williams; Daryll	3:33
10.	"The Rest Is Noise"	J. Smith	4:58
11.	"Girl"	J. Smith	4:02

Japanese edition bonus tracks
No.	Title	Length
12.	"Stranger in a Room" (instrumental)	3:03
13.	"Loud Places" (instrumental)	4:51
14.	"All Under One Roof Raving" (instrumental)	5:55
15.	"All Under One Roof Raving"	5:59

Sample credits

- "Gosh" includes samples of BBC Radio 1's One in the Jungle.
- "Sleep Sound" contains elements from "Karma" written by Taneisha Smith, Kerry Brothers and Alicia Augello-Cook; and "It's a Blue World" written by Bob Wright and Chett Forrest.
- "SeeSaw" contains an interpolation of "See Saw", written by Peter Buffett, Mary Buffett, Jeff Mehl, Billy Guy and Sylvia Robinson; and elements from Mark Leckey's video Fiorucci Made Me Hardcore (1999).
- "Obvs" contains samples from "Paradise of Replica" by After Dinner; and "Stimela (Cool Train)", as performed by Hugh Masekela.
- "Hold Tight" contains a sample from "Sun City – The UK Garage Innovators", as featured in the documentary Rewind 4Ever: The History of UK Garage, directed by Alex Lawton.
- "Loud Places" contains a sample of "Could Heaven Ever Be Like This" by Idris Muhammad.
- "I Know There's Gonna Be (Good Times)" contains a sample of the recording "Good Times" as performed by The Persuasions; and All Junglists – A London Somet'ing Dis'.
- "Girl" contains an extract from Top Boy; a portion of "Burning" as written by Sebastian Maschat, Erlend Oeye and Marcin Öz, and performed and recorded by The Whitest Boy Alive; also samples "Our Prayer" written by Brian Wilson; "Out There" recorded by Studio, written by Rasmus Hägg and Dan Lissvik and produced by Lissvik; and "I.O.U" performed by Freeez and written by Arthur Baker and John Robie.

== Personnel ==
Credits adapted from the liner notes of In Colour.

- Jamie Smith – performance; production, recording (all tracks); mixing (tracks 1–8, 10, 11); artwork
- Romy – vocals (tracks 3, 8); guitar (tracks 6, 8); vocal samples (track 5)
- Oliver Sim – vocals (track 6)
- Young Thug – vocals (track 9)
- Popcaan – vocals (track 9)
- Novelist – additional background sample (track 9)
- Four Tet – production (track 3)
- Rodaidh McDonald – engineering (track 6)
- Tom Elmhirst – mixing (tracks 2–11)
- David Wrench – mixing (track 1)
- Joe Visciano – additional engineering (track 8); mixing assistance (all tracks)
- Mandy Parnell – mastering
- Phil Lee – artwork

== Charts ==
=== Weekly charts ===
Weekly chart performance for In Colour
Chart (2015)	Peak position
Australian Albums (ARIA)	2
Australian Dance Albums (ARIA)	1
Austrian Albums (Ö3 Austria)	13
Belgian Albums (Ultratop Flanders)	4
Belgian Albums (Ultratop Wallonia)	18
Danish Albums (Hitlisten)	17
Dutch Albums (Album Top 100)	4
French Albums (SNEP)	26
German Albums (Offizielle Top 100)	15
Greek Albums (IFPI)	23
Irish Albums (IRMA)	5
Irish Independent Albums (IRMA)	1
Italian Albums (FIMI)	39
Japanese Albums (Oricon)	50
New Zealand Albums (RMNZ)	7
Norwegian Albums (VG-lista)	10
Portuguese Albums (AFP)	9
Scottish Albums (Official Charts)	3
Spanish Albums (Promusicae)	37
Swedish Albums (Sverigetopplistan)	24
Swiss Albums (Schweizer Hitparade)	8
UK Albums (Official Charts)	3
UK Dance Albums (Official Charts)	1
UK Independent Albums (Official Charts)	1
US Billboard 200	21
US Top Dance Albums (Billboard)	1
US Independent Albums (Billboard)	2
US Indie Store Album Sales (Billboard)	2

=== Monthly charts ===
Monthly chart performance for In Colour
Chart (2025)	Peak position
German Classical Albums (Offizielle Top 100)	8

=== Year-end charts ===
2015 year-end chart performance for In Colour
Chart (2015)	Position
Australian Dance Albums (ARIA)	16
Belgian Albums (Ultratop Flanders)	47
Belgian Albums (Ultratop Wallonia)	189
UK Albums (OCC)	95
US Dance/Electronic Albums (Billboard)	8

2016 year-end chart performance for In Colour
Chart (2016)	Position
Belgian Albums (Ultratop Flanders)	191
US Dance/Electronic Albums (Billboard)	15

== Certifications ==
Certifications for In Colour
Region	Certification	Certified units/sales
Canada (Music Canada)	Gold	40,000^{‡}
United Kingdom (BPI)	Gold	100,000^{‡}
^{‡} Sales+streaming figures based on certification alone.

== Release history ==
Release history and formats for In Colour
Region	Date	Format	Edition	Label	Ref.
Australia	29 May 2015	CD; LP; digital download	Standard	Young Turks; Remote Control	
Germany	29 May 2015	CD; digital download	Standard	Young Turks; XL	
Germany	29 May 2015	LP	Standard; deluxe	Young Turks; XL	
Ireland	29 May 2015	CD; LP; digital download	Standard	Young Turks	
France	1 June 2015	CD; LP; digital download	Standard	Young Turks	
United Kingdom	1 June 2015	CD; digital download	Standard	Young Turks	
United Kingdom	1 June 2015	LP	Standard; deluxe	Young Turks	
United States	2 June 2015	CD; LP; digital download	Standard	XL	
Japan	3 June 2015	CD; digital download	Standard	Hostess	
