= Fiorucci Made Me Hardcore =

- Screenshot from the film
- Directed by: Mark Leckey
- Produced by: Mark Leckey
- Release date: 1999
- Running time: 15 minutes
- Country: United Kingdom
- Language: English

Fiorucci Made Me Hardcore is a 1999 video (Note: Leckey remarked "It's not a film, it's a video." in his Liverpool John Moores University masters lecture.) by British contemporary artist Mark Leckey.

== Background ==
Fiorucci Made Me Hardcore came out of a discussion between Gavin Brown, Martin McGeown and Leckey. They were at a gallery private view in London, and Emma Dexter, then a curator at the Institute of Contemporary Arts (ICA), talked to Leckey. He argued that the most exciting art form of the time was the music video, and intrigued, Dexter invited him to make a work demonstrating it. It was later first screened at the ICA.

The title, Leckey said, was about the notion that "something as trite and throwaway and exploitative as a jeans manufacturer (Fiorucci) can be taken by a group of people and made into something totemic, and powerful, and life-affirming."

== Synopsis ==
Fiorucci Made Me Hardcore is collaged from tape footage from 70s, 80s and 90s underground dance scene in the UK, including portions of footage from the 1977 Tony Palmer film The Wigan Casino. It starts with the disco scene of the 1970s, touches upon the Northern soul of the late 1970s and early 1980s and climaxes with the rave scene of the 1990s; the mashup soundtrack Leckey created for the film follows the same temporal structure as a soundscape, with him occasionally interjecting dialogue. Notably, at one point, an animated element - a bird tattoo image - appears as if released from the hand of a dancer, then carried into the next shot finds its place on the arm of another of the film's nightclubbing subjects. The film follows a looping structure, bookending itself with a low frame rate time-lapse shot of clouds.

== Legacy ==
Charlotte Higgins, writing for The Guardian, remarked that "Fiorucci changed the game." Jamie xx sampled dialogue from the film, including Leckey reciting the names of fashion brands, on "All Under One Roof Raving". The Avalanches also sampled dialogue on "Overcome" from their 2020 album We Will Always Love You.

In July 2018, Leckey's YouTube upload of Fiorucci Made Me Hardcore was temporarily taken down by FremantleMedia, but was reactivated two days later.

On October 4, 2019, Leckey created a "ghosted" version of Fiorucci Made Me Hardcore to mark its 20th anniversary.
