= Far Nearer / Beat For =

"Far Nearer" / "Beat For"

Single by Jamie xx
- Released: 6 June 2011
- Recorded: 2011
- Genre: Post-dubstep; trip hop
- Length: 6:50 ("Far Nearer"); 5:45 ("Beat For")
- Label: Numbers; XL
- Songwriter: Jamie Smith
- Producer: Jamie xx

Jamie xx singles chronology
| "I'll Take Care of U" (2011) | "Far Nearer" / "Beat For" (2011) | "Take Care" (2012) |

"Far Nearer" / "Beat For" is the debut solo single of English producer Jamie xx, who rose to fame as being a member of the indie pop band the xx. The double A-side single was released on 6 June 2011 through Numbers under license from XL Recordings.

== Composition ==
The single features two songs, "Far Nearer", a downtempo song with steel pan drums and Caribbean rhythms and tones, and "Beat For", a post-dubstep song with pitch shifted, distorted vocals and a heavy bassline.

== Reception ==
The single received positive reception upon release. Larry Fitzmaurice of Pitchfork Media named the track "Far Nearer" as "Best New Track" for the week of 6 June 2011. Reviewing the single, Fitzmaurice said:

While the downcast bleeps of "Beat For" sound similar to the moody, melodic strain of vocal-abstracted bass music that's become so prevalent over the last year, "Far Nearer" is another thing entirely-- a bright, steel-drum laden burst of euphoria that sounds better suited for beach umbrellas than dark clubs, melodically recalling the Tough Alliance at their bounciest. Crisp drum tracks ping-pong across "Far Nearer"'s wide span, clapping and retreating around the song's dramatic, pitch-fucked vocal sample: "I feel better when I have you near me". After all that waiting, "Far Nearer" is finally something you can keep close; forget "better," it feels great.

— Larry Fitzmaurice for Pitchfork Media

The single reached a peak of No. 128 on the UK Singles Chart.

== Track listing ==
All songs written and produced by Jamie Smith.

| No. | Title | Length |
|---|---|---|
| 1. | "Far Nearer" | 6:50 |
| 2. | "Beat For" | 5:45 |
| Total length: | | 12:35 |

== Chart positions ==
| Chart (2011) | Peak position |
|---|---|
| UK Singles Chart | 128 |
