= Drunken Bakers =

Publication information
- Publisher: Viz
- First appearance: 2003
- Created by: Barney Farmer and Lee Healey

The Drunken Bakers is a strip cartoon in the British adult humour magazine Viz created by writer Barney Farmer and artist Lee Healey. It depicts the alcohol-dominated lives of two forlorn bakers who attempt to run a small bakery. The strip was adapted into a video-art installation piece by the artist Mark Leckey in 2006, and a novel 'Drunken Baker' by Barney Farmer in 2018.

The strip has been compared to the work of Samuel Beckett. Its nihilistic aspects have impressed critics. Roberta Smith, in The New York Times said "The aesthetic compression of Mr Farmer's dialogue and Mr Healey's line...convey an oppressive sense of the drinker's irresistible drive for oblivion."

== Premise ==
The two bakers attempt to run a bakery together. Their names have never been mentioned; one has sparse black hair, the other has a bulbous nose and large phiz of white hair (in flashbacks he is shown to have had dark hair when younger), bearing a passing resemblance to Harpo Marx. They are drawn as - and have the personalities of - a pair of classic clown archetypes, an odd couple: the curly haired but balding one being short and aggressive, the taller being doleful. In one episode, a funeral, they were drawn as wearing suits that were for the curly-haired one much too small, and for the taller one much too big - another classic clown type. According to Roberta Smith, the characters are "two middle-aged Bumstead-like alcoholics haplessly lurching from one disaster and one drink to the next as they attempt to run a bakery."

Both bakers suffer from severe alcoholism, and every strip shows them drinking strong alcoholic beverages such as various liqueurs. Their idea of a Wednesday half-closing is to sit on a public seat in front of a local off-licence, enjoying the 'view'. The black-haired one has an estranged daughter as his wife left him on a Christmas Eve. Occasionally the curly haired one will remind him of this, usually due to the black haired one offending the curly haired one. They try their best to bake something every night, but because of their inebriation, the results are always hopeless. As critic Steve Lowe says,

Before long, they're both staggering round a smoke-filled bakery surrounded by empty spirits bottles. Again. It's tricky to say what's so appealing about their slide from being worthy citizens to utterly wrecked lost souls. Writer Barney Farmer and artist Lee Healey imbue the strips with a real sense of despondency; these aren't drunks who have convivial escapades or adventures - they are drunks who drink, get drunk, pass out and burn the cakes. And being bakers somehow makes it worse: it seems such a wholesome occupation.

Their shop is run down, and has few customers; the pair sometimes look back to more prosperous, happier times, but are always brought back to their dismal present-day reality. If they even manage to bake something, it is often inedible, sometimes even toxic. For instance in one episode they baked cakes made with paraffin instead of milk - "This milk is blue and it tastes funny". The only exception to this is the 25th anniversary of the opening of the bakery, when the black-haired one decides to bake twin cakes in the form of the number 25. He succeeds, producing the number 25 in cake form, while his partner drinks mulled wine made in the kettle, which has held something nasty. In the final frame the inevitable happens - the fellow vomits up his stomach contents all over the anniversary cakes, and so their only success is utterly ruined.

Customers sometimes arrive at the baker's shop, asking for various breads or pastries, at Christmas, a whole lot of Christmas cakes, and once even a five-tiered wedding cake. The bakers promise they'll bake it for them, but always fail to fulfil their promise. Recent strips have featured one of the protagonists being hospitalised with renal failure while the other drinks rum at his bedside. Their shop, which is almost perpetually empty of produce, especially the front window, has been vandalized many times, and has burnt down several times, generally due to them leaving the oven on and falling into a drunken stupor.

The strip is fatalistic; the bakers will never reform, their customers will never get proper service, and nobody is doing a thing about it. Nevertheless, they carry on. As art critic Emily Mears remarks, "somehow, with the remarkable fortitude of true career drunks and in a rather sweet depiction of brotherly love, they prop each other up and return, strip after strip, to bake again." Some storylines fail to resolve themselves and end indeterminately, reinforcing the character's cyclical and depressing existence. In one strip, one of the bakers is bitten by a stray dog he has befriended, but he doesn't notice. "Your mouth is pissing blood" remarks the other baker in the final frame.

Whereas most of the comics in Viz have traditional hand-lettered captions and dialogue, the Drunken Bakers strip instalments (and other, less regular strips by Farmer and Healey) have typeset speech balloons. This gives Farmer and Healey's work a significantly different appearance from other Viz material.

== Leckey exhibition ==
In 2006 The Drunken Bakers were the subject of an exhibition by Mark Leckey at Tate Britain. Leckey created a film using frames from the original strips to construct a narrative and added a soundtrack spoken by himself and his colleague Steve Claydon in Liverpudlian accents. According to Emily Mears,

By fading the screen to black between episodes, Leckey constructs an elliptical narrative that mirrors the sense of time lost by the drinkers and the viewer. The video plays in a white box with a white carpet; a clock projected onto the outside of the box tells a stuck time, the hour hand slipping back to three each time it manages to reach four.

In Roberta Smith's words, Leckey constructs "dreamy, druggy, disjointed variants on music videos...He has ingeniously filmed the comic strip with close-ups and jump-cuts, creating a kind of stop-action animation, and added a skillfully explicit soundtrack replete with convincing belches, slurps, breaking glass and vomiting." Smith says that Leckey's artwork is less an original work than an "adaptation or an homage" of the original cartoon.

Lecky also created models of the bakers, exhibited as Drunken Bakers Dozen in 2007.

== Critical acclaim ==
The strip and the Tate Britain exhibition have received wide critical acclaim from both the art and literary worlds. Alan Moore has said, "I think the Drunken Bakers is like Samuel fucking Beckett or something. It's horrible and really funny." Steve Lowe in The Guardian says that "Comedy drunks have been around since drinks first began, but few have been so utterly forlorn as the Drunken Bakers." Christopher Howse compares it to the animated sketch show Monkey Dust, describing "another episode of 'Drunken Bakers', in which one alcoholic baker succumbs to internal bleeding to the complete indifference of his drinking companion. It's brilliant."

== Book ==
The characters from the Viz cartoon also feature in a standalone novel, Drunken Baker, written by Barney Farmer and published by Wrecking Ball Press on 26 April 2018.
