= Mid Air (Romy album) =

2023 studio album

Studio album by Romy
- Released: 8 September 2023
- Studios: Promised Land, Start Here (London); Can Jay (Ibiza)
- Genre: Dance-pop
- Length: 34:18
- Label: Young
- Producers: Romy; Fred Again; Stuart Price; Francine; Koreless; Brian Eno; Jamie xx; Avalon Emerson

Singles from Mid Air
- 1. "Strong" Released: 14 November 2022; 2. "Enjoy Your Life" Released: 11 April 2023; 3. "Loveher" Released: 7 June 2023; 4. "The Sea" Released: 25 July 2023; 5. "She's on My Mind" Released: 11 December 2023

Mid Air is the debut solo album by the xx member Romy Madley Croft, released mononymously as Romy. The album was released on 8 September 2023 by the record label Young. The album was primarily produced by Romy in collaboration with Fred Again and Stuart Price, and consists of dance-pop influenced by the likes of Everything but the Girl and Calvin Harris. Regarded by Romy as a love letter to the gay clubs she attended growing up, the album themes include love, grief, and mental health. The album was received positively by critics, and appeared on record charts from numerous countries. "Strong" was nominated for Best Dance/Electronic Recording at the 66th Annual Grammy Awards.

== Background and recording ==
Romy first met Fred Again in 2018, after she finished touring for the xx's album I See You. The two hit it off and started writing together, with the intent of sending songs to other artists, but when they wrote "Loveher" in those sessions, Romy decided the song should be hers.

Romy first announced that she was working on the album during an Instagram Live set on 19 April 2020, where she also debuted the song "Weightless". On 29 September that year, she released her solo debut single, "Lifetime", which was produced by Fred Again and Marta Salogni. During an appearance on the BBC Radio 1 Live Lounge on 17 January 2023, Romy said the album was "very close to being finished."

The album was mostly written during the COVID-19 lockdown, when Romy was missing nightclubs. Romy collaborated with Stuart Price on the suggestion of Young founder Caius Pawson. Romy described the writing process as her and Fred Again writing and, "in terms of the evolution, the sonics and the finishing of it. that's [Price]." "The Sea" was partly written during a trip to Ibiza for the xx bandmate Oliver Sim's 30th birthday.

== Release ==
Prior to the album's announcement, Romy released two singles. The lead single, "Strong", was released on 14 November 2022, and features Fred Again, who also produced with Romy and Stuart Price. The second single, "Enjoy Your Life", was released on 11 April 2023, features a sample of American singer-songwriter Beverly Glenn-Copeland, and was produced by Romy, Fred Again, Price, and Romy's bandmate Jamie xx.

The album was announced on 7 June 2023, and set for release on 8 September, by the record label Young. Young, known as Young Turks until 2021, had previously released albums by the xx. The album announcement came along with a third single, "Loveher", which also samples Glenn-Copeland and was produced by Fred Again. The fourth single, "The Sea", was released on 25 July 2023. On 11 December, a music video was released for "She's on My Mind" starring Maisie Williams and directed by Vic Lentaigne, and four tour dates were announced in 2024 for Los Angeles, New York City, Buenos Aires and Santiago.

== Style and influence ==
Mid Air is considered dance-pop, with The Guardian's Alexis Petridis saying it "sets out its stall at the point where pop meets the dancefloor." Petridis described the album as "driven almost exclusively by four-to-the-floor beats, and featuring a voice that sounds ineffably melancholy even when singing about happiness", comparing it to Everything but the Girl's 1996 album Walking Wounded. He also noted "hints of Daft Punk's filtered French house", said the song "She's on My Mind" contained "breezy Euro-disco", and that the album "most frequently evokes [...] the early 00s wave of ultra-commercial trance hits."

In an interview, Romy said she was intentionally referencing 2000s dance-pop and trance pop. She also mentioned the influence of the Calvin Harris and Dua Lipa song "One Kiss", Tiësto's remix of the Delerium song "Silence", and English music duo Everything but the Girl. She called the album a "collection of songs celebrating love, navigating loss and exploring identity", "musically inspired by dance music and a love letter to the queer clubs I first went to when I was growing up and the people I met there. The music I heard that made me feel more alive and less alone", as well as "a diary of our [Romy and her wife, Vic Lentaine's] relationship" and about "grief, mental health and processing".

== Reception ==
Mid Air ratings
Aggregate scores
Source	Rating
AnyDecentMusic?	7.9/10
Metacritic	82/100
Review scores
Source	Rating
AllMusic	4/5 stars
DIY	4.5/5 stars
Exclaim!	8/10
The Guardian	4/5 stars
The Irish Times	3/5 stars
Mojo	4/5 stars
NME	5/5 stars
The Skinny	4/5 stars
Uncut	7/10

According to the review aggregator Metacritic, Mid Air received "universal acclaim" based on a weighted average score of 82 out of 100 from 9 critic scores. Uncut felt that while it is "an album occasionally rooted in grief following the loss of Romy's parents, it seeks to take those moments of joy and dancefloor elation". Mojo described the album as "an ecstatic love letter to love, but also the queer clubs where Romy found validation and her soundtrack to liberation". Alexis Petridis of The Guardian wrote that Romy "tops off vivid house and trance tunes with pop smarts and personal lyrics" and found that it is "musically far more neon-hued than the xx" although "its brightness is harnessed to lyrics that look inwards, sounding authentically personal".

=== Awards and nominations ===
Mid Air awards and nominations
Year	Organisation	Award	Recipient	Status	Ref.
2023	Grammy Awards	Best Dance/Electronic Recording	"Strong"	Nominated	
2024	Brit Awards	British Dance Act	Romy	Nominated	

=== Year-end lists ===
Mid Air on year-end lists
Publication	#	Ref.
Billboard	25	
Clash	48	
DIY Magazine	20	
Double J	19	
The Guardian	49	
Mondo Sonoro	4	
NME	13	
Oor	11	
Rolling Stone UK	—N/a	
The Standard	11	

== Track listing ==
All lyrics are written by Romy Madley Croft with others noted; all music is composed by Madley Croft with others noted. All tracks are produced by Madley Croft with others noted.

Mid Air track listing
No.	Title	Lyrics	Music	Producers	Length
1.	"Loveher"		Fred Gibson	Fred Again	3:49
2.	"Weightless"		Gibson; Stuart Price	Fred Again; Price; Francine	4:29
3.	"The Sea"		Gibson	Fred Again; Price	3:10
4.	"One Last Try"		Price	Price	2:41
5.	"DMC"		Lewis Roberts	Koreless	0:33
6.	"Strong" (featuring Fred Again)		Gibson; Price	Fred Again; Price	3:54
7.	"Twice"	Ilsey Juber	Juber; Price	Price	3:55
8.	"Did I"		Gibson; Price	Fred Again; Price	3:10
9.	"Mid Air" (featuring Beverly Glenn-Copeland)	Glenn-Copeland	Glenn-Copeland	Fred Again; Price; Brian Eno	1:36
10.	"Enjoy Your Life"	Glenn-Copeland	Gibson; Price; Jamie Smith; Oby Onyioha	Fred Again; Price; Jamie xx	4:00
11.	"She's on My Mind"		Gibson; Price; Kahley Avalon Emerson	Fred Again; Price; Avalon Emerson	3:01
Total length:					34:18

== Personnel ==
- Romy Madley Croft – vocals, creative director
- Fred Again – programmer (1–3, 6, 8–11), mixing engineer (2)
- Stuart Price – mixing engineer (3, 4, 6–11), programmer (2, 4, 6–11)
- Koreless – mixing engineer (5), programmer (5)
- Francine Perry – programmer (2)
- Teneil Throssell – programmer (6)
- Jamie xx – programmer (10)
- Emily Lazar – audio engineer, mastering engineer
- Chris Allgood – mastering engineer
- Vic Lentaigne – creative director, photography, album cover, art director
- Texas Maragh – design
- Rose Pilkington – art director, 3D logo
- River Cousin – logo design

== Charts ==
Chart performance for Mid Air
Chart (2023)	Peak position
Belgian Albums (Ultratop Flanders)	28
Belgian Albums (Ultratop Wallonia)	171
German Albums (Offizielle Top 100)	53
Scottish Albums (Official Charts)	7
Swiss Albums (Schweizer Hitparade)	79
UK Albums (Official Charts)	15
UK Dance Albums (Official Charts)	3
UK Independent Albums (Official Charts)	2
US Heatseekers Albums (Billboard)	13
US Top Album Sales (Billboard)	41
US Top Dance/Electronic Albums (Billboard)	8
