= I Know There's Gonna Be (Good Times) =

- UK and remix EP release cover art

Single by Jamie xx featuring Young Thug and Popcaan

from the album In Colour
- Released: May 22, 2015
- Studio: Fortress Studios (London, England)
- Genre: UK funky; hip hop; dancehall; pop
- Length: 3:33
- Label: Young Turks
- Songwriters: Jamie Smith; Andre Sutherland; Jeffery Williams; Ted Daryll
- Producer: Jamie xx

Jamie xx singles chronology
"Gosh" (2015)	"I Know There's Gonna Be (Good Times)" (2015)	"Idontknow" (2020)

Young Thug singles chronology
"Check" (2015)	"I Know There's Gonna Be (Good Times)" (2015)	"Rihanna" (2015)

Popcaan singles chronology
"Unruly Prayer" (2015)	"I Know There's Gonna Be (Good Times)" (2015)	"Way Up" (2015)

Music video
- "I Know There's Gonna Be (Good Times)" on YouTube

"I Know There's Gonna Be (Good Times)" is a song by English music producer Jamie xx, with featured vocals from American rapper Young Thug and Jamaican musician Popcaan. The song was released as the third single from Jamie xx's debut studio album, In Colour, on 22 May 2015 in the UK and 28 August in the U.S. The official music video for the song was uploaded to YouTube on 28 September 2015. "I Know There's Gonna Be (Good Times)" peaked at number 115 on the UK Singles Chart and number 90 on the Australian ARIA Charts.

It also appears on the soundtrack for the video game NBA Live 16 and NBA 2K17 while also appearing in the Pilot episode of Euphoria. English rapper Skepta's grime-influenced remix of the song made its debut on Drake's OVO Sound Radio on Apple Music's Beats 1 radio station. On March 3, 2021, the song was certified gold by the Recording Industry Association of America (RIAA) for combined sales and streaming data of over 500,000 units in the United States.

== Production ==
In an interview with The Fader, Jamie Smith stated "I don't feel like I'm very good at making music, in terms of like the technical side of it—it's more like trying stuff out until something that I love happens. Sometimes I'll be quite good at the first 10 seconds of a song, then I'm lost. "I Know There's Gonna Be (Good Times)" was like that."

The song started with a sample from "Good Times" from The Persuasions. "It's an a cappella record where they are doing barbershop-style backing, and there's a beautiful soul song over the top," Smith stated. This record was found by Smith while he was living in Detroit and "had time to kill" before his tour started. "The day after I bought it, I immediately got that feeling and wanted to get to work right away on making something out of it." While "messing around" with the track for a little while, he then went to New York City and was listening to Hot 97 driving over a bridge; this experience was described by him as "a real catalyst in terms of what direction [he] wanted to take the song." "I was listening to hip-hop radio all the time while I was there; and I thought I’d have a go at trying to make a song that would get played on one of those kind of stations."

Afterward, Smith asked various artists to create their own versions of the song, including separate versions from American rapper Young Thug and Jamaican singer Popcaan, and decided to "[splice] the two of them together [for the song] because their voices work really well together." This collaboration was turned out to be the version that Smith he and his team liked for the album. There was also an alternate take of the song which revolves around Persuasions' sample that he played for an interviewer from Pitchfork.

== Composition ==
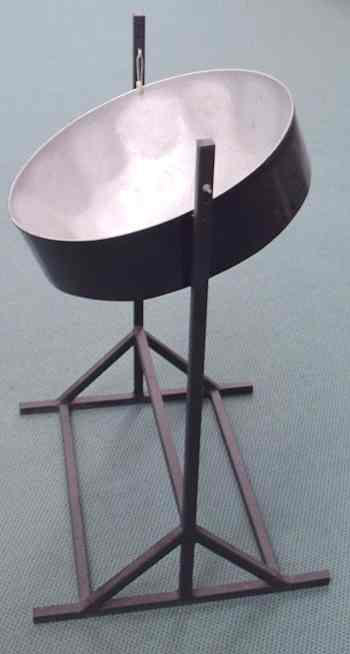
A child-size version of a steelpan was being used as an instrument on the track.

Many journalists noticed the soul, blues and Caribbean vibe from the song appeared on many other of Smith's records. Nick Murray from Rolling Stone called the song the "drinking-in-the-sun type vibe" cut of the album. "I like the contrast in making something that sounds sunny but also has an element of melancholy to it," he explains, discussing again those who mistake the xx as dour. "I think there has always been sort of an element of that brighter side when I make music, just because it's when I'm happiest."

The song was described as a "big, fat, generous morsel of R&B goes to the heart of the way Smith treats his inspirations," with "the subtle Caribbean vibe of so many Jamie xx records", "omnipresent steel drums, exploding with overtones." On the song, Smith used steelpans which he discovered while recording The xx' first album. Later while on tour in the United States, he ended up buying a child-size version of the instrument, which he describes in rapturous terms. "You can make it sound quite melancholy," he says. "But at the same time, it reminds me of paradise.”

== Critical reception ==
"I Know There's Gonna Be (Good Times)" was ranked at number 10 on the Pazz & Jop annual year-end critics' poll distributed by The Village Voice. The song also came in at #26 on the annual Triple J Hottest 100 for 2015.

Pitchfork named the song as the third best track of 2015, adding: "Profane instead of reverent, sun-bright instead of club-dark, drunk instead of ecstatic, "I Know There’s Gonna Be (Good Times)" is about getting low instead of climbing high. Built from little more than a snare roll, finger snaps, and chimes, Jamie xx made a breezy pop confection that alights on dancehall, trap, as well as doo-wop without ever settling on any one sound." In 2019, Uproxx, Stereogum, and Pitchfork ranked the song as the 11th, 65th, and 100th best song of the 2010s respectively.

== Music video ==
The official music video for "I Know There's Gonna Be (Good Times)", lasting three minutes and thirty seconds, was uploaded on 28 September 2015 to Jamie xx's Vevo channel on YouTube. The video was directed by Rollo Jackson.

== Track listing ==
iTunes Remixes EP
No.	Title	Length
1.	"I Know There's Gonna Be (Good Times)" (featuring Young Thug and Popcaan)	3:33
2.	"I Know There's Gonna Be (Good Times)" (Skepta Remix) (featuring Frisco and Popcaan)	3:43
3.	"I Know There's Gonna Be (Good Times)" (Dre Skull Remix) (featuring Assassin, Konshens, Kranium and Popcaan)	4:32
4.	"I Know There's Gonna Be (Good Times)" (Instrumental)	3:39

== Charts ==
Chart (2015)	Peak position
Australia (ARIA)	90
Belgium (Ultratip Bubbling Under Flanders)	5
Belgium (Ultratip Bubbling Under Wallonia)	35
Netherlands Single Tip (Single Top 100)	1
Netherlands (Dutch Dance Top 30)	30
UK Singles (Official Charts Company)	115
UK Indie (Official Charts)	7

== Certifications ==
Region	Certification	Certified units/sales
Canada (Music Canada)	Platinum	80,000^{‡}
United Kingdom (BPI)	Gold	400,000^{‡}
United States (RIAA)	Gold	500,000^{‡}
^{‡} Sales+streaming figures based on certification alone.

== Release history ==
Region	Date	Label	Format	Ref.
United Kingdom	22 May 2015	Young Turks	Digital download	
United States	28 August 2015	Young Turks; 300	Digital download	
