= We're New Here =

Remix album by Gil Scott-Heron and Jamie xx
- Released: February 21, 2011
- Recorded: 2010
- Studio: XL Studio (London)
- Genre: Post-dubstep
- Length: 35:35
- Labels: Young Turks; XL
- Producers: Malcolm Cecil; Jamie xx; Richard Russell; Gil Scott-Heron

Gil Scott-Heron chronology
I'm New Here (2010)	We're New Here (2011)	Nothing New (2014)

Jamie xx chronology
We're New Here (2011)	In Colour (2015)

Singles from We're New Here
- 1. "NY Is Killing Me" Released: November 30, 2010; 2. "I'll Take Care of U" Released: January 6, 2011

We're New Here is a remix album by American vocalist Gil Scott-Heron and English music producer Jamie xx, released on February 21, 2011, by Young Turks and XL Recordings. A longtime fan of Scott-Heron, Jamie xx was approached by XL label head Richard Russell to remix Scott-Heron's 2010 studio album I'm New Here. He worked on the album while touring with his band The xx in 2010 and occasionally communicated with Scott-Heron through letters for his approval to rework certain material.

Incorporating dubstep and UK garage styles, Jamie xx applied electronic music techniques in his production to remix Scott-Heron's vocals from the original album over his own instrumentals. Although it is structured similarly, We're New Here eschews the original album's stark style and lo-fi production for bass-driven, musically varied production and sonical illumination of Scott-Heron's vocals. It has been noted by music writers for recontextualizing Scott-Heron's narratives in Jamie xx's own musical influences and tastes.

The album did not chart in the United States, but debuted at number 33 on the UK Albums Chart, on which it spent two weeks. It was promoted with a multi-format release, including a limited edition box set, and the release of two singles, "NY Is Killing Me" and "I'll Take Care of U". We're New Here received universal acclaim from critics upon its release.

== Background ==
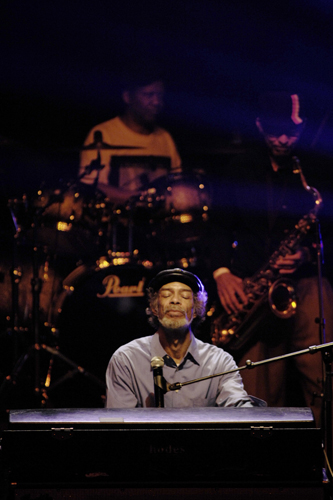
Gil Scott-Heron in 2009

Following a period of personal and legal troubles with drug addiction, Gil Scott-Heron recorded and released his first album of original material in sixteen years, I'm New Here (2010), with the assistance of XL Recordings-label head Richard Russell. Produced by Russell, the album served as a departure from Scott-Heron's earlier work, both musically and thematically, eschewing its soul, jazz, and funk styles and social commentary for more personal, reflective lyrics with ruminations on love, loss, and identity, set to contemporary electronic music. It was well received by fans and music critics, who viewed it as a comeback for Scott-Heron.

Russell, a fan of English indie pop band The xx, proposed the idea of remixing I'm New Here to the band's percussionist and producer Jamie xx. Russell's production on I'm New Here was heavily influenced by the xx's self-titled debut album, which showcased Jamie xx's bassy, beat-oriented and minimalist production. After its success, Jamie xx had occupied himself with solo production work, remixing other artists, and DJing in clubs in the United Kingdom and Europe.

Jamie xx was a longtime fan of Scott-Heron's music, which had been introduced to him by his parents as a youth. Russell later said of his decision to enlist him, "We didn't want lots of remixes by different people. That can be confusing. Gil was open to Jamie re-interpreting the whole album". According to Jamie xx, he himself had no point of reference in remixing another artist's album, and later said of taking on the project:

It was a bit nerve-wracking because this is the first time I've ever done an album on my own. But I was really just eager to get at it and I knew exactly what I wanted to do.

== Production ==
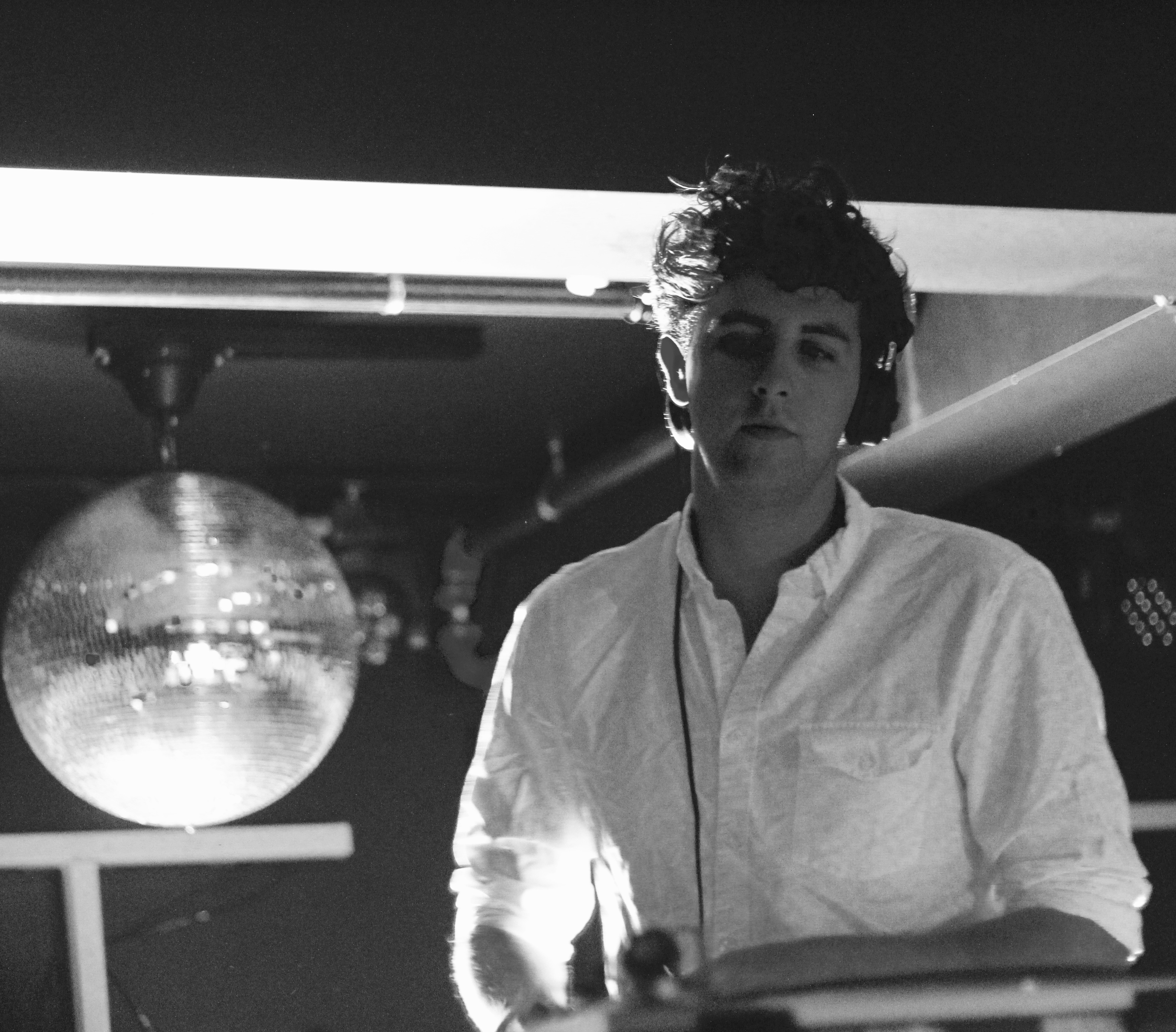
Jamie xx in 2015

Although Scott-Heron received top-billing for the release, Jamie xx worked solely on the remix project. For We're New Here, he remixed 13 of the original album's 15 songs, including its "interlude" cuts, mixing Scott-Heron's vocal tracks from the original recording sessions over his own beats and instrumentals, rather than the original music. Many of the remixes were created by Jamie xx on his laptop, while on tour with The xx. He also used an Akai MPC500 to produce beats for the album.

In a March 2010 interview, Jamie xx explained that the label "gave me the parts and let me do whatever I want, so I've been doing it on my laptop on tour. [I'm] only using [Gil's] vocals, I'm not using any of the original music from it, which is very freeing". On his intentions for the album's music, he explained in an interview for The Irish Times, "I wanted it to sound like everything I had been listening to in London. I wanted it to sound like something you’d hear on pirate radio. You hear so many different genres, and it’s all so convoluted and mixed-up, but it makes sense when you turn on the station".

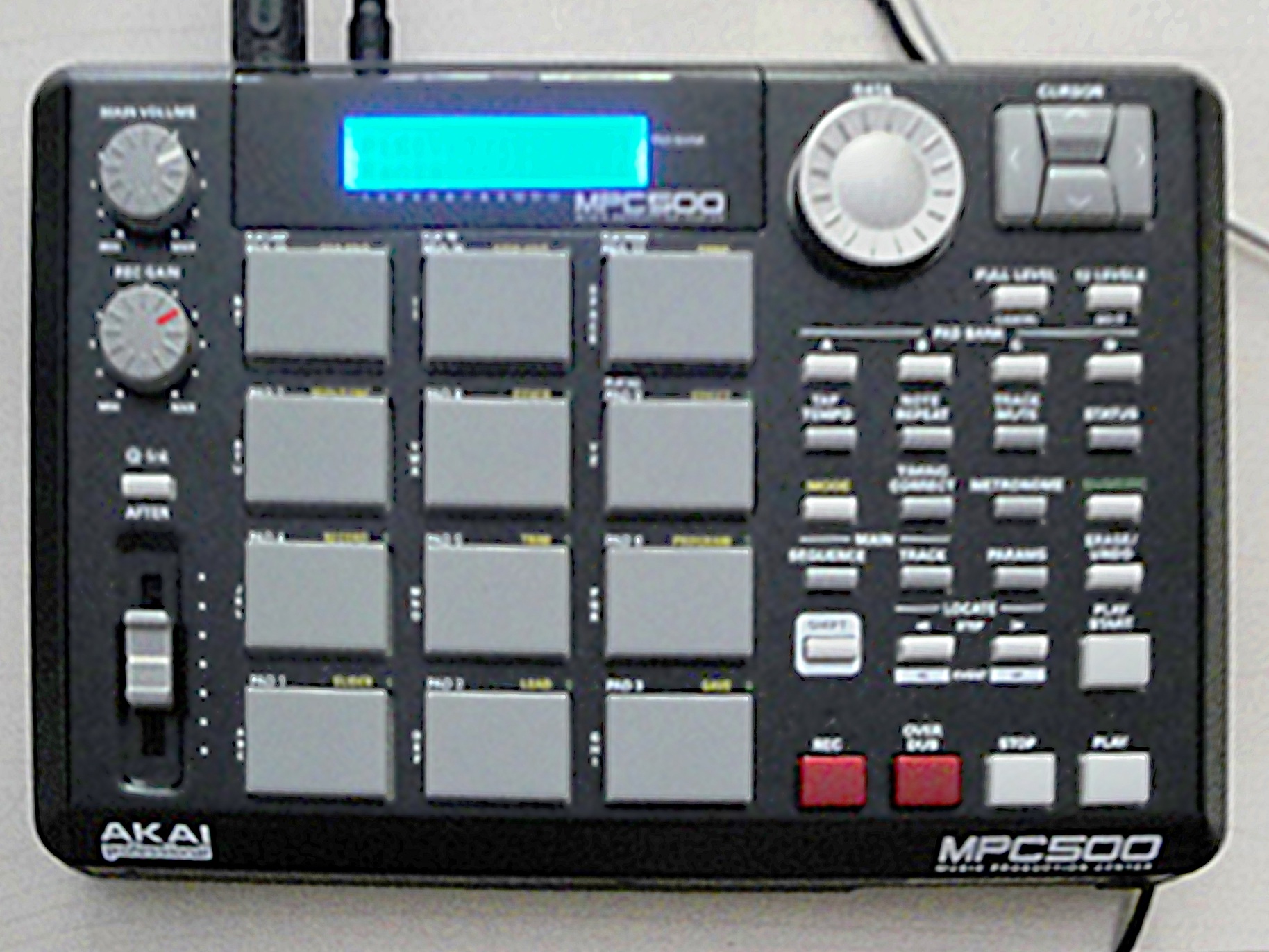
The Akai MPC500

In addition to vocal tracks from I'm New Here, Jamie xx mixed vocals from Scott-Heron's 1970s work. In an interview for Pitchfork, he explained his incorporation of these vocals and its meaning to the work as a whole, stating:

I wanted to show the difference between him then and now as well as the difference between my taste then and now. The songs that use his voice from older records are influenced by the stuff I liked 10 or 15 years ago, mostly sample-based productions like RJD2. And I wanted the album to explain itself, like a DJ set. I wanted to represent Gil well, but also use his voice as my own.

Although he was permitted by XL to remix I'm New Here, Jamie xx wrote longhand letters to Scott-Heron for his approval to rework the other vocal material: "Originally, I sent him the album and there were a couple of tracks he wasn't sure about. I had to write to him—he does handwritten letters, not e-mail—and explain why I wanted to use some of his older vocal tracks on the album ... So after I wrote him the letter, he said I was free to do whatever because he knew what I was doing". Scott-Heron was credited as a producer for the album, along with Russell and Malcolm Cecil, a producer and engineer on Scott-Heron's past work. The original vocals had been produced and engineered at Clinton Studios and Looking Glass Studios in New York. We're New Here was mixed at London's XL Studio, where additional recording also took place.

== Musical style ==
"The Crutch"
Jamie xx incorporates high-pitched vocal samples, frenetic drum and bass beats, and thick synth washes to the original recording of "The Crutch", which was a fervent poem about a junkie's life.

Similar to I'm New Here, We're New Here features 13 songs that include four interludes and is rhythmically stressed in sound. However, it contrasts the original album's stark style and lo-fi production with bass-driven, musically varied production and sonical illumination of Scott-Heron's vocals. We're New Here is considered a post-dubstep work. In remixing the album, Jamie xx incorporated dubstep tones, dance-influenced tempos, pitch-shifted and sped-up samples, wobble, sub-bass, and drum 'n' bass beats into the music. We're New Here also contains elements of trance, house, techno, hip-hop breakbeats, and electro music. Dan Hancox of The National noted in its sound "a melange of creaking bass hums, cascading UK garage drums and washes of electronic noise".

According to Thom Jurek of AllMusic, "Richard Russell's production on I'm New Here kept Scott-Heron's voice front and center; [Jamie xx] displaces it often, all but covering it with effects, beats, and pitched vocals in styles that cross the electronic music gamut". Tim Noakes of Dazed & Confused describes the album as "[his] love letter to sample culture and the history of the UK electronic underground. Against [Jamie xx]'s booming backdrop of sub bass breakdowns, obscure samples and two-step rhythms, Scott-Heron’s scarred poetic missives take on a more sinister edge". Ian Maleney of Slate comments on the album's music, "The beats and bass are classic dub [...] and the use of stretched and pitched vocal samples cement the albums place in the ever-developing dubstep cannon". Music critic Max Feldman notes "smothering" bass lines and "robust" beats, and writes that the album performs a "balancing act between the avant-garde end of the dubstep fallout" and "dance-ability".

The title track incorporates a sped-up sample of Gloria Gaynor's "Casanova Brown", with an emphasis on the line "I was lonely and naïve" from the sample. "Running" has Scott-Heron's spoken word vocals scattered and repeated. "Ur Soul and Mine" samples the vocals from Rui da Silva's house classic "Touch Me", distorting the vocals in the song's verse, but retaining its refrain. The densely produced "Home" features clattering snares, a heavily reverbed keyboard sample, a drum loop, and a vocal sample of Scott-Heron singing the line "home is where the hatred is...", taken from the song of the same name from his 1971 album Pieces of a Man. BBC Online's Ele Beattie said that Jamie xx's sampling "tunes the listener in and out of his musical predecessors. He rewires a personal musical canon into something utterly contemporary". Robert Christgau characterizes Scott-Heron's original narratives as those of "a drug fiend of considerable perversity and tremendous intelligence who's gonna be dead soon", and comments that Jamie xx "hears in [Scott-Heron's] last testament an irreversible disintegration that he translates into heavily sampled minimalist electro marked indelibly by Scott-Heron's weariness, arrogance, and wit."

== Release and promotion ==
We're New Here was released by Young Turks and XL Recordings on February 21, 2011, in the United Kingdom, and on February 22, 2011, in the United States. It was released on multiple formats, including CD, vinyl LP, vinyl box set, and digital download. Its limited edition box set release was made available via the album's official website and included the LP on pink heavyweight vinyl, an LP of instrumentals on green heavyweight vinyl, CDs of both the standard and instrumental album, and two photographic prints. Prior to its release, We're New Here had been made available for streaming via The Guardian website on February 14.

The album's first single, "NY Is Killing Me", was released digitally on November 30, 2010, and on January 10, 2011, as a limited edition one-sided 12-inch single. Sean Michaels of The Guardian wrote of the song, "Ghostly samples rise around Scott-Heron's vocals, combining the poet's inner-city canvas with [Jamie xx]'s dubstep roots. It's as good as anything the DJ has produced". The second single "I'll Take Care of U" was released on January 6, 2011. It features euphoric, house-inspired piano hooks and echoing guitar riffs. A music video for the single was directed by photographer Jamie-James Medina and AG Rojas, and it was released on March 4, 2011. Set in New York City, the video's plot follows a female boxer as she takes care of her child and trains for a fight.

We're New Here debuted at number 33 on the UK Albums Chart in the week ending March 5, 2011. It also entered at number four on the UK Indie Chart and at number 18 on the Digital Chart. The album dropped to number 60 on the UK Albums Chart in its second week, and fell off the chart in its third week of release. We're New Here did not chart in the United States. In Belgium, the album debuted at number 44 and subsequently spent five weeks on the Ultratop 50 Albums chart.

== Critical reception ==
Professional ratings
Aggregate scores
Source	Rating
AnyDecentMusic?	7.6/10
Metacritic	83/100
Review scores
Source	Rating
AllMusic	4/5 stars
The A.V. Club	A
Entertainment Weekly	B+
The Guardian	4/5 stars
MSN Music (Expert Witness)	A−
NME	7/10
Pitchfork	7.8/10
Q	4/5 stars
Spin	7/10
Uncut	4/5 stars

We're New Here was met with widespread critical acclaim. At Metacritic, which assigns a normalized rating out of 100 to reviews from mainstream publications, the album received an average score of 83, based on 28 reviews.

Reviewing for The New York Times, Ben Ratliff said the album is an improvement over "the bummed-out original" with "patience and breadth and almost zero pretension". AllMusic's Thom Jurek called it "a mercurial collaboration ... full of nods to other club styles and eras", and praised Jamie xx for "successfully (re)presenting Scott-Heron's music — integrity intact — in the present tense to a fickle yet discerning groove-centric culture without kitsch or excess". Chris Martins from The A.V. Club praised "the everlasting gravity of [Scott-Heron]’s words and wisdom", writing that "his pained, bluesy musings are as universally human as they are perennially pertinent". Pitchfork critic Sean Fennessey commended Jamie xx for being bold with Scott-Heron's material with a "finicky, hard-charging production [that] trumps Scott-Heron's voice, overpowering it with ideas, if not focus". Louise Brailey of NME wrote that he "coaxes fresh narratives from the source material" and that it "isn’t exactly groundbreaking, but it showcases a producer so in love with the music of now that he not only preserves the power of his source material, but makes it more relevant". In MSN Music, Christgau called the record "a young man's bad dream about mortality, and of interest as such", and wrote of the source material's importance to Jamie xx's remix, "the snatches of Scott-Heron's voice, cracked for sure but deeper than night nonetheless, delivers it from callow generalization and foregone conclusion." In The Wire, Joe Muggs found the recontextualization of Scott-Heron's words "impressionistic", and concluded, "there's a great danger in finding beauty in suffering, but this album takes that risk and reaps great dividends."

Some reviewers were more qualified in their praise. In The Observer, Kitty Empire said, while Jamie xx's productions are "consistently excellent, they aren't really there to augment Scott-Heron's words". Andy Gill of The Independent believed the remixing techniques "only occasionally work in its favour".

At the end of 2011, Uncut magazine named We're New Here the 32nd best album of the year. Christgau ranked it 20th on his list of the year's best albums for The Barnes & Noble Review.

== Track listing ==
Credits are adapted from the album's liner notes.

No.	Title	Writer(s)	Length
1.	"I'm New Here"	Bill Callahan, Jimmy Roach, Jamie Smith	3:26
2.	"Home"	Gil Scott-Heron, Smith	3:11
3.	"I've Been Me (Interlude)"	Scott-Heron	0:27
4.	"Running"	Scott-Heron, Smith	3:31
5.	"My Cloud"	Scott-Heron, Smith	4:27
6.	"Certain Things (Interlude)"	Scott-Heron, Giuliano Sorgini	0:09
7.	"The Crutch"	Bob Halley, Ben Raleigh, Scott-Heron, Smith	3:09
8.	"Ur Soul and Mine"	Rui da Silva, Cassandra Fox, Scott-Heron, Smith	4:17
9.	"Parents (Interlude)"	Bernard Purdie, Scott-Heron	0:28
10.	"Piano Player"	Scott-Heron, Smith	1:16
11.	"NY Is Killing Me"	Scott-Heron, Smith	5:43
12.	"Jazz (Interlude)"	Scott-Heron, Paul Simon, Smith	0:49
13.	"I'll Take Care of U"	Brook Benton, Smith	4:42

=== Sample credits ===
- "I'm New Here" contains a sample of the recording "Casanova Brown" as performed by Gloria Gaynor.
- "I've Been Me (Interlude)" contains a sample of "Boxcar Hobo" by Sassafrass.
- "Certain Things (Interlude)" contains a sample of the recording "Slaves" as performed by Giuliano Sorgini.
- "The Crutch" contains excerpts from "That's How Heartaches Are Made" as performed by Baby Washington.
- "Ur Soul and Mine" contains a sample of "Touch Me" by Rui da Silva.
- "Parents (Interlude)" contains a sample of "Hap'nin'", written by Bernard Purdie.
- "Jazz (Interlude)" contains a sample of the recording "Sixty-Eight Ways".

== Personnel ==
- Gil Scott-Heron – vocal producer, vocals
- Jamie xx – additional production, design, musician, remixing
- Malcolm Cecil – engineer, producer, synthesizer programming
- Romy Madley Croft – guitar
- Royce Jeffries – assistant
- Phil Lee – design
- Rodaidh McDonald – engineer, mixing
- Ichiho Nishiki – engineer, mixing
- Mandy Parnell – mastering
- Mischa Richter – photography
- Richard Russell – vocal producer
- Lawson White – engineer, mixing

== Charts ==
Chart (2011–14)	Peak position
Belgian Albums (Ultratop Flanders)	44
French Albums (SNEP)	38
Irish Albums (IRMA)	42
Scottish Albums (Official Charts)	45
UK Albums (Official Charts)	33
UK Independent Albums (Official Charts)	4

== See also ==
- "Take Care" (song)
