= Honey Dijon =

American DJ, producer and trans activist

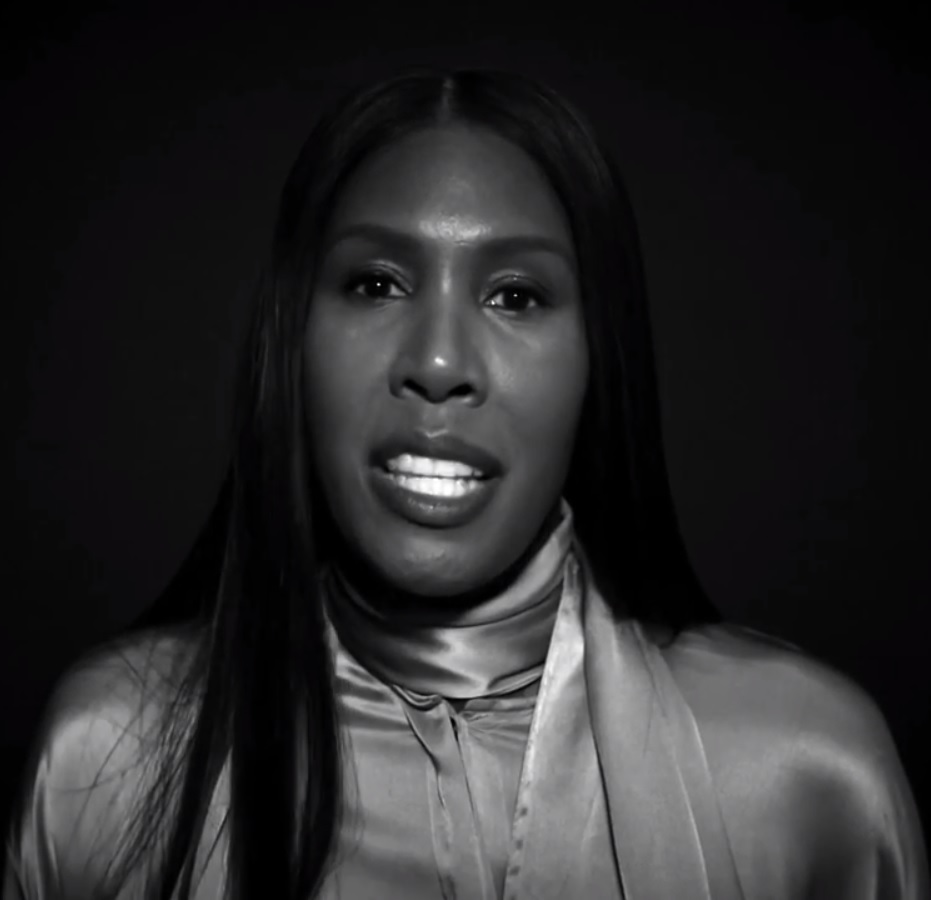
- Honey Dijon at an event hosted by Love magazine, 2018.

Background information
- Born: 1968 (age 57–58); Chicago, Illinois, U.S.
- Genres: House music
- Occupations: DJ; electronic musician; producer

Honey Redmond, (born in 1968), known professionally as Honey Dijon, is an American DJ, producer, and electronic musician. She was born in Chicago and is based in New York City and Berlin.

She has performed at clubs, festivals, art fairs, galleries and fashion events internationally.

== Biography ==
Honey Dijon grew up in the 1970s on the south side of Chicago, in what she has described as a "very middle-class, loving African-American family" that was very musical. She began clubbing during her mid-teens with her parents' acceptance as long as her academics did not suffer. In the 1990s, she began to perform as a DJ. Around 2000, she also became active as a producer.

During her time in Chicago, she met and was mentored by DJs and producers such as Derrick Carter, Mark Farina and Greenskeepers. In the late 1990s, Honey Dijon moved to New York, where she was introduced to Maxi Records and Danny Tenaglia. After first being exposed to techno in Chicago's house scene, she performed on New York City's underground club circuit and played sets at fashion shows.

In 2017, Dijon released her debut album, titled The Best of Both Worlds.

Dijon has collaborated with Louis Vuitton and Dior for several years, providing soundtracks for their runway presentations.

Dijon was described as a "popular house-music DJ" by the New York Times in 2013. In 2018, Resident Advisor stated that she had popularized "a rambunctious DJ style that leans heavily on golden-era disco, techno and house", while Dijon herself acknowledged that "a lot of people still associate me with swingy Chicago and classic house and disco, but I can rock dirty rhythmic techno as well."

In 2023 , Dijon won a Grammy award for best dance album for her work on Beyoncé's "Renaissance".

Dijon is featured in the BBC documentary series Disco: Soundtrack of a Revolution.

== Activism and public image ==
Redmond is transgender, and came out publicly shortly after moving to New York in the late 1990s. She has been a vocal advocate for trans rights and awareness, speaking from her experience as a black trans woman DJ in dance music. In 2016, she was interviewed by the British television channel Channel 4 on the issue of trans visibility. At a 2017 event hosted by the MoMA PS1 museum in New York City, she led a roundtable discussion "focused on those who have, like her, found safety and creative expression within the New York club scene."

While accepting her British Dance Act award at the Brit Awards 2025, Charli XCX shouted Honey Dijon out in her speech, among other dance acts she had been influenced by.

== Discography ==
=== Albums ===
- The Best of Both Worlds, Classic Music, 2017
- Black Girl Magic, Classic Music, 2022
- The Nightlife, SOS, 2026

=== Extended plays ===
- Xtra, Classic Music, 2018.
- Slap! EP, Classic Music, 2023.

=== Compilations ===
- Classic Through the Eyes Of: Honey Dijon, Classic Music, 2013.
- DJ-Kicks: Honey Dijon, !K7 Records, 2024.

=== Remixes ===
- Christine and the Queens – "Comme si" (Honey Dijon Remix) (2019)
- Harry Romero – "Tania" (Honey Dijon Remix) (2019)
- Madonna – "I Don't Search I Find" (Honey Dijon Remix) (2019)
- Neneh Cherry – "Buddy X" (Honey Dijon Remix) (2020)
- Blancmange – "Blind Vision" (Honey Dijon Remix) (2020)
- Aline Mayne – "Princess Boy" (Honey Dijon Remix) (2020)
- Jessie Ware – "Ooh La La" (Honey Dijon Remix) (2020)
- Alewya – "Sweating" (Honey Dijon Remix) (2020)
- Mike Dunn and Ruff N'Stuff – "Strike It" (Honey Dijon Re-Edit) (2020)
- Kiddy Smile – "Let a Bitch Know" (Honey Dijon's That Bitch Knew Extended Remix) (2020)
- Lady Gaga – "Free Woman" (Honey Dijon Realness Remix) (2020)
- Cakes da Killa and Proper Villains – "Don Dada" (Honey Dijon & Luke Solomon's Alcazar Remix) (2020)
- 702 – "Where My Girls At?" (Honey Dijon Remix) (2021)
- Ashnikko featuring Princess Nokia – "Slumber Party" (Honey Dijon Remix) (2021)
- DJ Minx – "Do It All Night" (Honey Dijon Remix) (2022)
- Beyoncé – "Break My Soul" (Honey Dijon Remix) (2022)
- David Bowie – "Let's Dance" (Honey Dijon Moonlight Remix) (2023)
- Dua Lipa - "Illusion" (Honey Dijon Remix) (2024)
- "The Power" (Honey Dijon Remix) – SNAP! (2025)
- Madonna - "Bring Your Love" (Peaktime Dub Remix) (2026)
- Madonna - "Bring Your Love" (Twilight Mix) (2026)

=== Songwriting and production credits ===
Credits are courtesy of Spotify and Tidal.

Title	Year	Artist	Album
"Cozy"	2022	Beyoncé	Renaissance
"Alien Superstar"	2022	Beyoncé	Renaissance
"Baddy On The Floor"	2024	Jamie XX	In Waves

== Awards ==
Year	Association	Category	Nominated work	Result	Ref.
2018	GLAAD Media Award	Outstanding Music Artist	The Best of Both Worlds	Nominated	
2018	DJ Award	Best House Artist	Herself	Nominated	
2019	DJ Award	House Master	Herself	Nominated	
2019	DJ Mag Best of North America Awards	Best DJ	Herself	Won	
2023	65th Annual Grammy Awards	Album of the Year	Renaissance	Nominated	
2023	65th Annual Grammy Awards	Best Dance/Electronic Album ^{[A]}	Renaissance	Won	
2023	GLAAD Media Awards	Outstanding Music Artist	Black Girl Magic	Nominated	
2026	Drama League Award	Outstanding Production of a Musical	Saturday Church	Pending	
2026	Lucille Lortel Award	Outstanding Musical	Saturday Church	Pending	

=== Notes ===
^{[A]} Winning producers in this category with less than a 50% album contribution are awarded with a Winner's Certificate.
