= Loud Places =

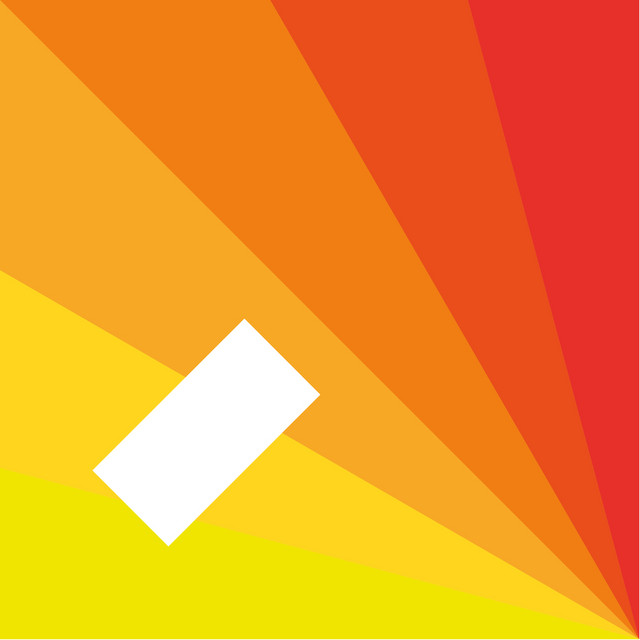
- Remixes cover

Single by Jamie xx featuring Romy

from the album In Colour
- B-side: Remixes (12")
- Released: 27 March 2015
- Studio: Fortress Studios (London, England)
- Genre: Post-dubstep; future garage; deep house; alternative R&B
- Length: 4:43
- Label: Young Turks
- Songwriters: Romy Madley Croft; Rick Nowels; Tony Sarafino; Jamie Smith; David Matthews
- Producer: Jamie xx

Jamie xx singles chronology
"All Under One Roof Raving" (2014)	"Loud Places" (2015)	"Gosh" (2015)

Music video
- "Loud Places" on YouTube

"Loud Places" is a song by English electronic music producer Jamie xx, with featured vocals from Romy Madley Croft, his bandmate in the xx. It is the eighth track on Jamie xx's album In Colour and was released as one of its singles on 27 March 2015. A music video for the song was released on the same day through YouTube. The song peaked at number 55 on the French Singles Chart and number 62 on the UK Singles Chart.

== Composition ==
Tracks from In Colour spans across different years in Smith's life, with "Gosh" and "Loud Places" representing where he was at the moment. The chorus sampled American jazz drummer Idris Muhammad's 1977 song "Could Heaven Ever Be like This". This use of sample was said by Thump's Angus Harrison as "particularly poignant" when Muhammad's death was less than a year before.

== Release ==
On 25 March 2015, Smith premiered "Gosh" and "Loud Places" on Annie Mac's BBC Radio 1 show.

== Music video ==
The official music video for "Loud Places", lasting five minutes and four seconds, was uploaded onto Jamie xx's YouTube channel on 27 March 2015. It was directed by Simon Halsall with JB Babenhausen and produced by Craig Dixon.

In the video, Smith and Croft can be seen riding skateboards while getting covered in confetti. Smith shared: “Before we made music together, from the age of like 13, Romy and I used to go out and skate."

== Track listing ==
- Young Turks — YT141

Side A
No.	Title	Length
1.	"Loud Places" (John Talabot's Loud Synths Reconstruction)	7:14
2.	"Loud Places" (Tessela Remix)	5:30

Side B
No.	Title	Length
1.	"Loud Places" (Barnt E-Mix)	7:05
2.	"Loud Places" (Herbert's Louder Dub)	5:27

== Charts ==
Chart (2015)	Peak position
Australia (ARIA)	103
Belgium (Ultratip Bubbling Under Flanders)	3
Belgium (Ultratip Bubbling Under Wallonia)	36
France (SNEP)	55
Scotland Singles (OCC)	41
UK Singles (OCC)	62
UK Indie (OCC)	3

== Certifications ==
Region	Certification	Certified units/sales
Canada (Music Canada)	Gold	40,000^{‡}
New Zealand (RMNZ)	Platinum	30,000^{‡}
United Kingdom (BPI)	Gold	400,000^{‡}
^{‡} Sales+streaming figures based on certification alone.

== Release history ==
Region	Date	Label	Format	Catalogue no.
United Kingdom	27 March 2015	Young Turks	Digital download; radio airplay	—
United Kingdom	28 August 2015	Young Turks	12"; digital download	YT141
