= Strong (Romy song) =

2022 song

Single by Romy featuring Fred Again

from the album Mid Air
- Released: 14 November 2022
- Genre: Trance
- Length: 3:54
- Label: Young
- Composer(s): Romy Madley Croft; Fred Gibson; Stuart Price
- Lyricist(s): Madley Croft
- Producer(s): Romy; Fred Again; Price

Romy singles chronology
"Lights Out" (2022)	"Strong" (2022)	"Enjoy Your Life" (2023)

Fred Again singles chronology
"Turn On the Lights Again" (2022)	"Strong" (2022)	"Rumble" (2023)

"Strong" is a song by the xx member Romy Madley Croft, released mononymously as Romy, featuring Fred Again. It was released on 14 November 2022 by Young, as the lead single to her debut album Mid Air. The trance song was written and produced by Romy, Fred Again, and Stuart Price.

The song is about grief, and was inspired by the death of Romy's parents. It was released with a music video directed by Romy's wife Vic Lentaigne, and stars Romy and her cousin Luis. It was nominated for Best Dance/Electronic Recording at the 66th Annual Grammy Awards, the first Grammy nomination of Romy's career.

== Writing ==
Romy initially paired up with Fred Again to write songs for other artists at a point where neither had yet to release any solo music. "Strong" came out of those early sessions, with the track inspired by Eurodance and trance music which Romy described as "emotional music to dance to". Stuart Price, who Romy started collaborating with on the suggestion of Young founder Caius Pawson, was brought in to finish the track. The song went through multiple iterations, including one change to the bassline inspired by Romy performing the song at a festival and noticing the crowd dancing with their chests rather than their hips as she preferred.

The song is about grief, and was inspired by the death of Romy's parents. Per Romy, the song "is an invitation to the listener and to myself to open up about difficult emotions and connect. It's about vulnerability, and the lyric 'You don't have to be so strong' is about it being OK to be vulnerable."

== Release ==
The song was first teased during Fred Again's Boiler Room set, and later given its live debut at a Fred Again concert in Amsterdam on 25 November. The single was released on 14 November 2022 by Young, as the lead single to her debut album Mid Air. With the release, Romy shared a statement saying:

"Strong" came from a moment in my life when I was processing past grief. Whilst writing the lyrics I was thinking about my cousin Luis, we both have the shared experience of our mums passing away when we were young. I recognise in him the same trait I have which is to try and hold emotions down and put on a brave face. The song was a way to connect with these feelings, offer support and ultimately find a sense of release in the euphoria of music. Luis is with me on the single cover and in the music video too which was really special.

My friendship with Fred [Again] means a lot to me, our closeness helps me to feel safe to be honest and vulnerable lyrically and we definitely connect over our love of songwriting and emotions in dance music. It's amazing and inspiring seeing and hearing what Fred is doing in his solo work and I'm very excited to be releasing this song together.

"Strong" is Romy's second solo single, after she debuted with "Lifetime" in 2020. She also previously appeared on the single "Lights Out", alongside Fred Again and HAAi, which was released in January 2022.

== Remixes ==
In December 2022, in sessions recorded at the BBC's Maida Vale Studios, Romy's bandmate Oliver Sim performed a mashup of "Strong" and the Verve's "Bitter Sweet Symphony", backed by a "Queer choir" consisting of Romy, Låpsley, Marika Hackman, Katie Gavin, and Casey MQ.

Two remixes of the song, one by I. Jordan and the other by Pretty Girl, were released on 2 February 2023.

== Music video ==
The song came with a music video directed by Romy's wife Vic Lentaigne. It stars Romy and her cousin Luis hugging each other in the middle of a dancefloor while the camera circles around them. The idea of the video was Romy's, while casting Luis came from Lentaigne.

== Reception ==
DIY's Ben Tipple called the song "euphoric". The Irish Times's Siobhán Kane called it "surprising in its weird mixture of earnest lyrics and frantic tempo". Kane and The Guardian's Alexis Petridis both compared it to the music of Faithless. NME's Nick Levine wrote that Romy singing the line "You don't have to be so strong" felt "both cathartic and uplifting." The Skinny's said it had "an upbeat energy, encouraging vulnerability and the blissful feeling of euphoria when you're able to truly let go in love." Rolling Stone UK's Hollie Geraghty called it "as much a maximalist trance banger as it is a powerful comment on grief."

"Strong" was nominated for Best Dance/Electronic Recording at the 66th Annual Grammy Awards, losing to Skrillex, Fred Again, and Flowdan's "Rumble". It was the first Grammy nomination of Romy's career, about which she said "The fact that this song could reach more people ... and hopefully encourage more people to open up about their feelings is really special to me."

== Personnel ==
- Romy – vocals, lyrics, composer, producer
- Fred Again – composer, producer, programmer
- Stuart Price – composer, producer, mixing engineer, programmer
- Teneil Throssell – programmer
- Emily Lazar – recording and mastering engineer
- Chris Allgood – mastering engineer

== Charts ==
Chart performance for "Strong"
Chart (2022)	Peak position
UK Dance (OCC)	25
UK Indie (OCC)	27
