= All Under One Roof Raving =

Single by Jamie xx
- Released: 23 June 2014
- Recorded: 2014
- Genre: Post-dubstep; trip hop
- Length: 5:59
- Label: Young Turks
- Songwriter(s): Jamie Smith
- Producer(s): Jamie xx

Jamie xx singles chronology
"Girl / Sleep Sound" (2014)	"All Under One Roof Raving" (2014)	"Loud Places" (2015)

"All Under One Roof Raving" is a song by English electronic music producer Jamie xx. It was released as a single on 23 June 2014. He created it during the end of The xx's Coexist Tour after he was "missing life in London and trawling through any music and videos that reminded me of home", adding "It serves as a reminder, not to take any time for granted at home or away".

It contains crowd noise and vocal samples from 90s rave film footage like "Fiorucci Made Me Hardcore" (1999) and "All Junglists! A London Somet'ing Dis" (1994).

== Commercial performance ==
The single peaked at 3 on the UK's Official Physical Singles Chart on 6 September 2014.
