= Gosh (song) =

Single by Jamie xx

from the album In Colour
- Released: 4 May 2015
- Studio: Fortress Studios (London, England)
- Genre: Post-dubstep; future garage; deep house; gqom
- Length: 4:51
- Label: Young Turks
- Songwriter: Jamie Smith
- Producer: Jamie xx

Jamie xx singles chronology
"Loud Places" (2015)	"Gosh" (2015)	"I Know There's Gonna Be (Good Times)" (2015)

Music video
- "Gosh" on YouTube

"Gosh" is a song by English electronic music producer Jamie xx, released as a single on 4 May 2015.

== Release ==
On 25 March 2015, Jamie xx premiered "Gosh" and "Loud Places" on Annie Mac's BBC Radio 1 show.

== Music videos ==
The official music video for "Gosh" was released on 27 April 2015 through YouTube. It was directed by Erik Wernquist. The music video depicts the terraforming and colonization of Mars over the course of time, ending on a fully terraformed planet.

=== Second music video ===
A second music video, directed by Romain Gavras, was released on 1 July 2016 on Apple Music. It was uploaded to YouTube on 4 October 2016. The video was filmed around the Eiffel Tower replica of the Tianducheng housing estate in the city of Hangzhou, Zhejiang Province in China, and it features the actor Hassan Koné and 400 pupils from the Xiaolong Martial Arts School. The video was met with acclaim.

==== Accolades ====
Year	Award	Category	Result
2016	UK Music Video Awards	Video of the Year	Won
2016	UK Music Video Awards	Best Alternative Video	Won
2016	UK Music Video Awards	Best Color Grade	Won
2016	UK Music Video Awards	Best Styling	Nominated
2016	UK Music Video Awards	Best Cinematography	Nominated
2016	Camerimage	Best Music Video	Nominated
2016	Rober Awards Music Poll	Best Promo Video	Nominated
2017	Berlin Music Video Awards	Best Cinematography	Won
2017	Cannes Lions International Festival of Creativity	Gold Lion for Cinematography	Won
2017	Cannes Lions International Festival of Creativity	Silver Lion for Production Design / Art Direction	Won
2017	Cannes Lions International Festival of Creativity	Silver Lion for Direction	Won
2017	D&AD Awards	Best Music Video	Yellow Pencil
2017	D&AD Awards	Best Direction	Graphite Pencil
2017	D&AD Awards	Best Cinematography	Graphite Pencil
2017	Grammy Awards	Best Music Video	Nominated

== Release history ==
Region	Date	Label	Format
Various	4 May 2015	Young Turks	Digital download
Various	28 August 2015	Young Turks	12"
