= In Waves (Jamie xx album) =

Studio album by Jamie xx
- Released: 20 September 2024
- Length: 44:44
- Label: Young
- Producers: The Avalanches; Honey Dijon; Jamie xx; Rodaidh McDonald; Luke Solomon

Jamie xx chronology
In Colour (2015)	In Waves (2024)

Singles from In Waves
- 1. "Baddy on the Floor" Released: 15 April 2024; 2. "Treat Each Other Right" Released: 4 June 2024; 3. "Life" Released: 17 June 2024; 4. "All You Children" Released: 30 July 2024; 5. "Dafodil" Released: 29 August 2024; 6. "Waited All Night" Released: 18 September 2024

In Waves is the second studio album by English producer Jamie xx, released on 20 September 2024 through Young. It was preceded by the singles "Baddy on the Floor" featuring Honey Dijon and "Treat Each Other Right", and is his first album in nine years, following In Colour (2015). The album also includes collaborations with Jamie xx's xx bandmates Romy and Oliver Sim, as well as Honey Dijon, Kelsey Lu, John Glacier, Panda Bear, Robyn, the Avalanches, and Oona Doherty. An additional collaboration with Erykah Badu features on the deluxe vinyl, later made available on streaming platforms.

== Background ==
The album was recorded over a period of four years. In a statement, Jamie xx likened his experiences since releasing his previous album to "waves that we have all experienced together and alone", and said that he wanted to "make something fun, joyful and introspective all at once" as "the best moments on a dance floor are usually that" for him.

From 2020 to early 2024, Jamie xx released the standalone singles "Idontknow", "Let's Do It Again", "Kill Dem", and "It's So Good"; the latter was made for a Chanel ad campaign. All of the singles were included on the deluxe vinyl edition of the album, in addition to the new track "F U" featuring Badu.

The track "Wanna" contains samples of "RipGroove" by Double 99, and "Never Gonna Let You Go" by Tina Moore. The track "Still Summer" contains interpolations of "Nights in White Satin" by the Moody Blues.

== Promotion ==
The first single, "Baddy on the Floor", was released in April 2024, while the second single "Treat Each Other Right" was released alongside the album announcement on 4 June. The third single, "Life", was released on 17 June. The album was promoted with a residency at Venue MOT in London called "The Floor", which was held from 16 to 25 May and was described as a series of ten consecutive parties with surprise guests.

On 28 June, Jamie xx headlined the Woodsies Stage at the 2024 Glastonbury Festival and performed several tracks from In Waves among other songs. Romy, Oliver Sim, and Robyn joined him during the set to perform their collaborations from the album.

The release of In Waves was marked with a tour of intimate record store performances in Liverpool, Manchester, Brighton, and Bristol between 20th and 23rd September 2024. Following this was two sold-out shows at Alexandra Palace on 25th and 26th September 2024, one of which was added due to "phenomenal demand".

== Critical reception ==
Professional ratings
Aggregate scores
Source	Rating
AnyDecentMusic?	7.9/10
Metacritic	84/100
Review scores
Source	Rating
AllMusic	4.5/5 stars
The Arts Desk	4/5 stars
Clash	9/10
The Line of Best Fit	8/10
The Guardian	4/5 stars
Mojo	4/5 stars
MusicOMH	5/5 stars
NME	4/5 stars
Pitchfork	7.3/10
PopMatters	8/10

In Waves received a score of 84 out of 100 on review aggregator Metacritic based on 18 critics' reviews, which the website categorised as "universal acclaim". For Alexis Petridis of The Guardian, "there are noticeably more tracks on In Waves [than on In Colour] that are evidently designed to be heard through big speakers at 3am. [...] The work of a smart, skilled producer that never seems to betray its lengthy and apparently anguished gestation, In Waves hits the target far more often than it misses, and when it does miss, it's not by far." Jessie Dorris of Pitchfork described it as "a well-polished record animated by the ecstatic and easy pleasures of the dancefloor" that "generally plays to [Jamie xx's] strengths".

=== Year-end lists ===
Select year-end rankings for In Waves
Publication/critic	Rank	Ref.
Exclaim!	50	
Rough Trade UK	22	
Time Out	6	
Variety	2	
GQ	—	

== Track listing ==
In Waves track listing
No.	Title	Lyrics	Music	Producer(s)	Length
1.	"Wanna"		James Smith; Omar Adimora; Tommie Ford; Tina Moore; Timothy Liken; Andy Quin	Jamie xx	2:15
2.	"Treat Each Other Right"	Almeta Latimer	Smith; Latimer; Rodaidh McDonald	Jamie xx; McDonald	4:00
3.	"Waited All Night" (featuring Romy and Oliver Sim)	Ilsey Juber; Romy Madley-Croft; Oliver Sim	Smith; David Brandt; Alesha Dixon; Alan Glass; Juber; Madley-Croft; Mary Ann Morgan; Sim	Jamie xx	3:28
4.	"Baddy on the Floor" (featuring Honey Dijon)	Smith; Honey Redmond	Smith; Balal Bashir; Kenneth Burke; Mikal Safiyullah; Luke Solomon; Redmond	Jamie xx; Honey Dijon; Solomon	3:42
5.	"Dafodil" (featuring Kelsey Lu, John Glacier, and Panda Bear)	Patrick Adams; John Glacier; David Jordan Jr.; Benjamin Lennox; Kelsey McJunkins	Smith; Adams; Glacier; Jordan; McJunkins; Lennox	Jamie xx; McDonald	3:32
6.	"Still Summer"		Smith; Justin Hayward	Jamie xx	3:25
7.	"Life" (with Robyn)	Robin Carlsson	Smith; Klas Åhlund; Carlsson; Marc Cerrone; Raymond Donnez	Jamie xx	3:22
8.	"The Feeling I Get from You"	Edward Nelson	Smith; McDonald; Nelson	Jamie xx	3:42
9.	"Breather"		Smith	Jamie xx	6:16
10.	"All You Children" (featuring the Avalanches)	Nikki Giovanni	Smith; Robert Chater; Anthony Di Blasi; Giovanni; Andy Szekeres	Jamie xx; The Avalanches	4:14
11.	"Every Single Weekend" (Interlude)	Howard Harris	Smith; Chater; DiBlasi; Harris; Szekeres	Jamie xx; The Avalanches	1:11
12.	"Falling Together" (featuring Oona Doherty)	Oona Doherty	Smith	Jamie xx	5:37
Total length:					44:44

Japanese bonus track
No.	Title	Length
13.	"It's So Good"	4:39

Deluxe 3×LP/digital bonus tracks
No.	Title	Length
13.	"F U" (featuring Erykah Badu)	3:34
14.	"It's So Good"	4:39
15.	"Do Something"	2:20
16.	"Let's Do It Again"	7:19
17.	"Kill Dem"	3:43

== Personnel ==
- Jamie xx – programming, engineering
- Matt Colton – mastering
- David Wrench – mixing (tracks 1, 2, 4, 5, 10, 11)
- Rodaidh McDonald – mixing (tracks 3, 6, 8, 12), instrumentation (8)
- Tom Norris – mixing (track 7)
- Amy Ratcliffe – studio personnel (tracks 1–5, 9–11)
- Grace Banks – studio personnel (tracks 1–5, 9–11)
- Hal Ritson – programming (track 4)
- Honey Dijon – programming (track 4)
- Richard Adlam – programming (track 4)
- James Anderson – instrumentation (track 4)
- Klas Åhlund – instrumentation (track 7)
- The Avalanches – programming (tracks 10, 11)

== Charts ==
=== Weekly charts ===
Weekly chart performance for In Waves
Chart (2024)	Peak position
Australian Albums (ARIA)	10
Austrian Albums (Ö3 Austria)	18
Belgian Albums (Ultratop Flanders)	2
Belgian Albums (Ultratop Wallonia)	40
Dutch Albums (Album Top 100)	22
French Albums (SNEP)	54
German Albums (Offizielle Top 100)	17
Irish Albums (Official Charts)	26
Japanese Hot Albums (Billboard Japan)	85
New Zealand Albums (RMNZ)	11
Portuguese Albums (AFP)	45
Scottish Albums (Official Charts)	5
Swedish Albums (Sverigetopplistan)	60
Swiss Albums (Schweizer Hitparade)	15
UK Albums (Official Charts)	5
UK Dance Albums (Official Charts)	1
UK Independent Albums (Official Charts)	2
US Billboard 200	146
US Independent Albums (Billboard)	26
US Top Dance Albums (Billboard)	3

=== Year-end charts ===
Year-end chart performance for In Waves
Chart (2024)	Position
Australian Dance Albums (ARIA)	27
