= Romy Madley Croft =

English singer-songwriter (born 1989)

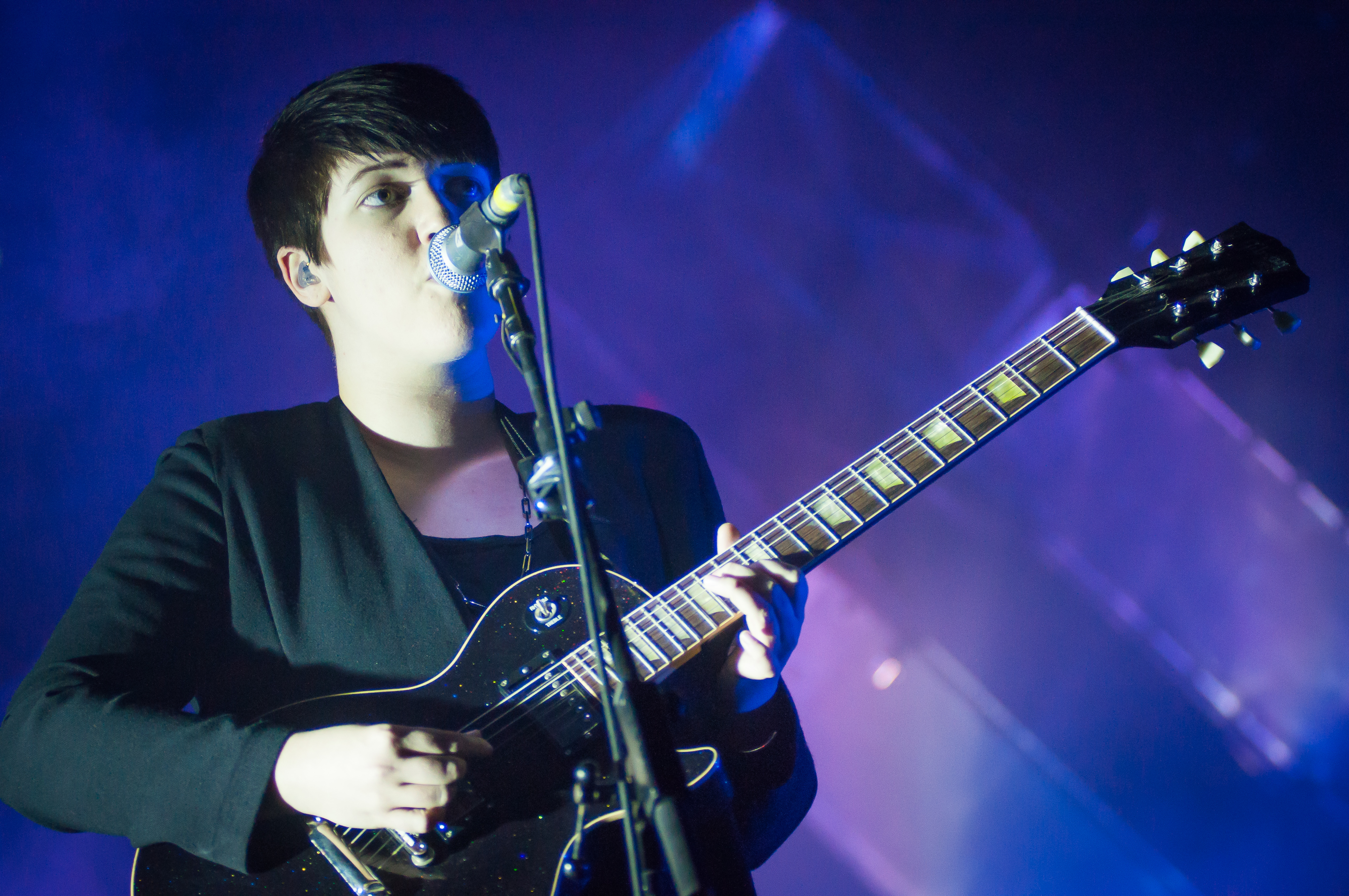
- Madley Croft in 2012

Background information
- Also known as: Romy
- Born: 18 August 1989 (age 37); London, England
- Genres: Dance; pop
- Occupations: Musician; singer; songwriter
- Instruments: Vocals; guitar; keyboards
- Years active: 2005–present
- Spouse: Vic Lentaigne

Romy Madley Croft (/ˈrɒmiː/ ROM-ee, born 18 August 1989), also known mononymously as Romy, is an English musician. She is the guitarist and co-vocalist of the xx, who won the Mercury Music Prize. In 2023, she released her first solo album, Mid Air, which peaked at No.15 on the UK Albums Chart. She was nominated for the Brit Award for British Dance Act at the 2024 Brit Awards.

== Early life ==
The only child of a primary school teacher mother and a father who worked in a library, Romy grew up in Putney. Her mother died when she was 11 of a brain haemorrhage. Her father died nine years later from complications due to alcoholism. Romy describes these events saying: "It's been horrible, but it's made me who I am and made me stronger. I think I take that experience with me."

Romy started to play in a band aged 15, and began to play gigs aged 17. Her interest in clubbing began when she went to the gay club, Ghetto, in Soho, London, every Thursday with future bandmate Oliver Sim when they were 16 and 17. The manager of the Ghetto later asked her to DJ at the club.

The first gig Romy saw was Peaches, who she sees as an inspiration, supporting The Distillers. She also cites Madonna as an influence.

== Music ==
=== The xx ===
Romy met Oliver Sim at nursery school in London when they were 3, and they lived 5 minutes away from each other. They attended the same primary school and then met Jamie Smith (Jamie xx) and Baria Qureshi when they were 11 at the induction day for Elliott School, the secondary school they all attended. They all studied GCSE Music together. Romy played guitar and had drum lessons for a short period. Whilst Romy, Sim, and Qureshi knew Smith, and Romy used to go skateboarding with him, Smith did not join the band until after being formally introduced by their label, Young Turks (now Young).

The band released their debut album xx in 2009, their second album Coexist in 2012, and their third album I See You in 2017.

Romy used to DJ at the afterparties for the xx, but stopped when someone asked if she was being ironic, as she didn't want to risk compromising the band's reputation.

=== Mid Air ===
Romy's album Mid Air (2023) makes her the last member of The xx to release solo material, following Jamie xx's "In Colour" (2015) and Oliver Sim's "Hideous Bastard" (2022). It was released on 8 September 2023.

Romy said she wanted to make an upbeat pop album for queer women, which she would have wanted growing up. She cited Peaches as an influence for this album and new phase of her work. Many of the songs are inspired by her relationship with her wife, Vic Lentaigne. Lentaigne also worked with Romy to produce photography and direct videos for the album, as well as encouraging Romy to cast her cousin Louis in the video for "Strong".

The album was coproduced by Jamie xx, Stuart Price and Fred Again. Jamie xx said of her, "She makes very catchy melodies. That's the thing that always gets me."

The video for "She's On My Mind" was directed by Vic Lentaigne and features actor Maisie Williams.

The song "Enjoy Your Life" features a sample from Beverley Glenn-Copeland's song "La Vita".

Nick Levine gave the album 5 stars in the NME, describing it as "a nostalgic but box-fresh dance album that taps into a deep well of feeling." Giving the album four stars, Alexis Petridis of the Guardian described the album as "Driven almost exclusively by four-to-the-floor beats, and featuring a voice that sounds ineffably melancholy even when singing about happiness".

=== Singles ===
In September 2020, three years prior to her release of Mid Air, Romy released the single "Lifetime". Sea Griffiths, in Mixmag, described the single as "A joyous exultation of a record, it has that unique blend of euphoria and melancholia so often found in timeless dancefloor records...Both lyrically and sonically the record feels like the valve being released on a canister of pent up emotion and speaks to an internal craving to simply ‘have some fun’ that so many of us are feeling right now.". Romy purposely chose to only employ women and non-binary artists to work on the remix package for the single. It featured Anz, Planningtorock, Jayda G and HAAi.

In May 2024, Romy released the single "Always forever". It was co-written and co-produced with Fred Again. Joy Anonymous are also credited as producers. The song samples Donna Lewis' 1996 single "I Love You Always Forever". The video for the single was directed by writer and director Charlotte Wells.

=== Other collaborations ===
Romy has worked with Fred Gibson, also known as Fred Again, Sampha, Jessie Ware. Romy has also written for Dua Lipa, King Princess and Kelela.

== Personal life ==
Romy came out as gay to her dad when she was 15, but did not come out publicly in the xx during the first two album releases due to fears of negative response. She said that "I didn’t want to jeopardize anything with the band. And genuinely that makes me feel really sad now...When I look back at that time, I definitely think I kept some things back on those first two albums. That’s just the reality."

Romy married photographer and filmmaker Vic Lentaigne in 2021. They live in East Sussex.

Romy previously dated, and was engaged to visual artist, Hannah Marshall.

Romy started a club night called "Feelings Café" held weekly at Hackney cocktail bar Behind This Wall, where she DJ'ed alongside her friends, including Kim Ann Foxman and Pandora's Jukebox, as well as those who had never DJ'ed before, for three months before she said the night club "imploded on itself".

Romy is a self-described introvert.

== Discography ==
=== Studio albums ===
List of studio albums, with selected details and peak chart positions
Title	Album details	Peak chart positions
Title	Album details	UK
Mid Air	Released: 8 September 2023; Label: Young; Format: digital download, streaming, vinyl, CD	15

=== Singles ===
List of singles, with year, album and chart positions
Title	Year	Peak chart positions	Album
Title	Year	LAT Air.	Album
"Lifetime"	2020	—	Non-album single
"Lights Out" (with Fred Again and HAAi)	2022	—	USB
"Strong" (with Fred Again)	2022	—	Mid Air
"Enjoy Your Life"	2023	—	Mid Air
"Loveher"	2023	—	Mid Air
"The Sea"	2023	—	Mid Air
"Always Forever"	2024	—	TBA
"Lift You Up" (with Jessie Ware)	2024	—	TBA
"I'm on Your Team" (with Sampha)	2024	—	TBA
"Love Who You Love"	2025	43	TBA
"—" denotes items which were not released in that country or failed to chart.

=== Other appearances ===
Title	Year	Other artist(s)	Album
"SeeSaw"	2015	Jamie xx	In Colour
"Loud Places"	2015	Jamie xx	In Colour
"Come Find Me"	2015	Emile Haynie, Lykke Li	We Fall
"We Will Sin Together"	2020	Jehnny Beth	To Love Is to Live
"Liar" (Re: Romy)	2023	Paramore	Re: This Is Why
"Waited All Night"	2024	Jamie xx, Oliver Sim, The xx	In Waves

=== Songwriting discography ===
List of songs written or co-written for other artists, showing year released and album name
Title	Year	Artist	Album
"Share It All"	2014	Jessie Ware	Tough Love
"Stranger in a Room" (featuring Oliver Sim)	2015	Jamie xx	In Colour
"Fingertips"	2016	OneRepublic	Oh My My
"Jupiter"	2017	Kelela	Take Me Apart
"Better"	2017	Kelela	Take Me Apart
"Turn to Dust"	2017	Kelela	Take Me Apart
"Buttcheeks"	2018	6 Dogs	Non-album singles
"Electricity"	2018	Silk City and Dua Lipa	Non-album singles
"More / Diamond Ring" (featuring Ty Dolla Sign and 6lack)	2018	Benny Blanco	Friends Keep Secrets
"Why Hide" (featuring Diana Gordon)	2019	Mark Ronson	Late Night Feelings
"Homegirl"	2019	King Princess	Cheap Queen
"Still Learning"	2020	Halsey	Manic
"Heroine"	2020	Jehnny Beth	To Love Is to Live
"French Countryside"	2020	Jehnny Beth	To Love Is to Live

== Awards and nominations ==
Year	Awards	Work	Category	Result	Ref.
2024	Grammy Awards	"Strong" (with Fred again..)	Best Dance/Electronic Recording	Nominated	
2024	Brit Awards	Herself	Best Dance Act	Nominated	
