= Mark Leckey =

British artist (born 1964)

- Born: 1964 (age 61–62); Birkenhead, Wirral, England
- Education: Northumbria University (then Newcastle Polytechnic)
- Known for: Fiorucci Made Me Hardcore (1999); Industrial Light and Magic (2008)
- Style: Video
- Spouse: Lizzie Carey-Thomas
- Awards: Turner Prize; 2008

Mark Leckey (born 1964) is a British contemporary artist. His found object art and video pieces, which incorporate themes of nostalgia and anxiety, and draw on elements of pop culture, span several works and exhibitions. In particular, he is known for Fiorucci Made Me Hardcore (1999) and Industrial Light and Magic (2008), for which he won the 2008 Turner Prize.

His work has been widely exhibited internationally, including solo exhibitions at Kölnischer Kunstverein, Cologne, in 2008 and at Le Consortium, Dijon, in 2007. His performances have been presented in New York City at the Museum of Modern Art, Abrons Arts Center; at the Institute of Contemporary Arts, London, both in 2009; and at the Solomon R. Guggenheim Museum, New York City, in 2008. His works are held in the collections of the Tate and the Centre Pompidou.

== Life and career ==
Leckey was born in Birkenhead, Wirral, near Liverpool, England, in 1964. In a 2008 interview in The Guardian, he described how he grew up in a working-class family and became a "casual" in his youth. His parents both worked for Littlewoods, the clothes store and betting company based in Liverpool. School, at a comprehensive in Ellesmere Port in Cheshire, was not a happy experience for Leckey. He left school at 15 with one O Level, in art, and at 19 became obsessed with learning about ancient civilizations. He has described himself as an autodidact, "That's why I use bigger words than I should. It's a classic sign." Following a conversation with his stepfather, he took his A Levels and went to an art college in Newcastle from 1987 to 1990, but didn't enjoy it.

Leckey moved to New York in late 1995 and first returned to London in 1997, where he worked for web design agency Online Magic. When he made the video Fiorucci Made Me Hardcore in 1999, he was living in a tiny flat in Windmill Street, in Fitzrovia. He formed the band donAteller with Ed Laliq, and had the first gig at the 414 Club in Brixton. Later band members include Enrico David and Bonnie Camplin. He served as professor of film studies at the Städelschule, Frankfurt-am-Main, Germany from 2005 to 2009.

He lives in North London with his wife, Lizzie Carey-Thomas, a curator of contemporary art at the Serpentine Gallery, and their daughter.

=== Art career ===
Leckey's video work has as its subject the "tawdry but somehow romantic elegance of certain aspects of British culture," He likes the idea of letting "culture use you as an instrument." but adds that the pretentiousness that artists sometimes fall into is destructive to the artistic process: "What gets in the way is being too clever, or worrying about how something is going to function, or where it's going to be. When you start thinking of something as art, you're fucked: you're never going to advance." Matthew Higgs has described his work as “possess[ing] a strange nonartlike quality, operating, as it does, on the knife's edge where art and life meet." Leckey cited Erik Davis, the Californian cultural critic as a big influence. He classified himself as a pop artist.

He exhibited alongside Damien Hirst in the 1990 New Contemporaries exhibition at the ICA but afterwards dropped from view, before making a "comeback" with Fiorucci Made Me Hardcore in 1999. In 2004, he participated in Manifesta 5, The European Biennial of Contemporary Art. In 2006 he participated in the Tate Triennial. In 2013, Leckey toured the UK for his curatorial project, The Universal Addressability of Dumb Things, commissioned by the Hayward Gallery. In the autumn of 2014, the Wiels contemporary art centre in Brussels staged a mid-career retrospective devoted to Leckey. The exhibition, named Lending Enchantment to Vulgar Materials, is Leckey’s largest exhibition to date. The title comes from a letter by Guillaume Apollinaire, in which he claims that what he and filmmaker Georges Méliès do is "lend enchantment to vulgar materials".

In 2019 Leckey exhibited O' Magic Power of Bleakness at Tate Britain, London.

== Notable works ==
=== Fiorucci Made Me Hardcore (1999) ===
One evening in 1999, Gavin Brown, Martin McGeown and Leckey were at a gallery private view in London. Emma Dexter, then a curator at the Institute of Contemporary Arts (ICA), talked to Leckey, who argued that the most exciting art form of the time was music video. Intrigued, Dexter invited him to make a work. Leckey produced a 15-minute film that he called Fiorucci Made Me Hardcore. The work was first screened at the ICA.

The work is a compilation of found footage from the 1970s, 1980s and 1990s underground music and dance scene in the UK. It starts with the disco scene of the 1970s, touches upon the Northern soul of the late 1970s and early 1980s and climaxes with the rave scene of the 1990s. Mash-ups of a single soundtrack play during the whole video, giving a sense of unity and narrative to the video. However, there are moments of spoken text. At one point an animated element - a bird tattoo image - appears as if released from the hand of a dancer, then carried into the next shot finds its place on the arm of another of the film's nightclubbing subjects. Some dance moves are played on loop for a few seconds, some are played in slow motion.

A significant portion of the footage is taken from the 1977 Tony Palmer film The Wigan Casino made for Granada TV. It follows on the path of several previous appropriative art video artists and critics have remarked on its similarities with William S. Burroughs' technique of cut-ups, a literary technique whereupon a text's sentences or words are cut up and later randomly rehashed into a new text.

Writing about Leckey’s first few video pieces, which in addition to Fiorucci… include We Are (Untitled) (2000) and Parade (2003), the art critic Catherine Wood said that they "represent the human subject striving to spread itself out into a reduced dimensionality. His subjects dance, take drugs and dress up in their attempts to transcend the obstinate physicality of the body and disappear in abstract identification with the ecstasy of music, or the seamlessness of the image."

The title, Leckey said, was about the notion that "something as trite and throwaway and exploitative as a jeans manufacturer can be taken by a group of people and made into something totemic, and powerful, and life-affirming." Leckey admitted that he cried during the making of the video.

=== Sound System (2002) ===
Leckey has made ‘immersion’ pieces that offer aural and visual stimuli to the audience, such as Sound System (2002).

=== Made in 'Eaven (2004) ===
This video takes place in Leckey’s empty London studio. The camera rotates around Jeff Koons’ Rabbit (1986), which is placed in the center of the empty room, Leckey's London flat. The video was transferred to 16 mm film and "is presented on a pedestal, like a sculpture." The shiny surface of the sculpture reflects the room clearly, but there is no reflection of the camera, after a while the viewer realizes that there was never a bunny in the studio; it was a computer-generated image of Koons' work.

Leckey is an admirer of Koons and has talked about what it is that attracts him to his work: "I like the idea of something that's almost inhuman in its perfection, like Bunny. It's as if it just appeared in the world, as if Koons just imagined it and it appeared. I always get too involved in the work."

=== Drunken Bakers (2006) ===
In this video Leckey appropriates the Drunken Bakers comic strip from Viz, written by Barney Farmer and illustrated by Lee Healey. Leckey filmed the comic strip, added close-ups and jump-cuts reworked into a stop-motion-like video. Leckey has removed all the speech bubbles and replaced them with a dialogue read verbatim from the comic by himself and Steven Claydon, a member of his band JackTooJack. He also added aural effects with burping, vomiting, slurping, among others and fades to black between episodes.

The piece is projected on a white wall in a completely white room, a clock projected in the outside of the room moves from three to four, before returning to three and repeating the cycle. The comic and video itself lack colour, so the only two colours in the room are black and white. As with some of his previous work, it deals "with hedonistic time-wasting as a means of (temporary) escape from the strictures of capitalism and adult responsibility." Roberta Smith noted "Mr. Leckey conveys an oppressive sense of the drinker's irresistible drive for oblivion, excavating the painful realities that often spur comedy." In this act of appropriation, Leckey did not get official permission to use the material from Viz, "which, in a rare instance of corporate enlightenment, granted him permission retroactively."

=== Felix Gets Broadcast (2007) ===
In Felix Gets Broadcast (2007), Leckey features one of the earlier figures of Felix The Cat.

=== Industrial Light and Magic (2008) ===
He won the 2008 Turner Prize for his exhibition Industrial Light and Magic. It included the piece Cinema-in-the-Round a video lecture where "the artist offers a compilation of his talks on film, television and video about the relationship between object and image."

=== GreenScreenRefrigeratorAction (2010) ===
This performance work began with his inhaling the gases used as coolant for a Samsung fridge. Leckey voices, through digital modulation, the inner monologue of a black Samsung fridge-freezer, as it tries to explain itself to itself and the world around it. The work, Leckey said, is a kind of fantasy: that he could bring himself into "a state outside of myself, fridge-like, less-human, feeling like an image".

=== BigBoxStatueAction (2003–2011) ===
For BigBoxStatueAction, Leckey places one of his sound systems "in conversation" with icons of British modernist sculptures, such as Jacob Epstein's Jacob and the Angel and Henry Moore's sculpture. In order to elicit a response from the sculpture, he serenades it with a sound piece created from sampled music and archive material.

=== The Universal Addressability of Dumb Things / UniAddDumThs (2013–2015) ===
The Universal Addressability of Dumb Things was a curated exhibition held at the Bluecoat Gallery, Liverpool, then at Nottingham Contemporary. It took its title from a supposed concept in computing that refers to "the possibility of a network of objects communicating with each other like sentient agents", and featured three galleries presenting different collections of artifacts and art pieces from a wide range of history. Leckey imagined it as a work of fiction, in his own words a "non-realist, anti-realist, magic-realist, speculative, slipstream fiction, a sort of sci-fi show". He also sought to evoke techno-animism.

In 2015, Leckey exhibited UniAddDumThs, a "replication" of The Universal Addressability of Dumb Things, at Kunsthalle Basel. It featured entirely reproduced versions of the objects in the original exhibition via 3D printing and cardboard cutouts.

=== Dream English Kid, 1964 – 1999 AD (2015) ===
Leckey created Dream English Kid, 1964 – 1999 AD, a collage film with a coming-of-age theme created as an attempt to capture "found memories" of his life from the early 1960s to the late 1990s, which gradually builds up in anxiety and suspension. Harry Thorne, writing for Frieze, commented that elements of the film, such as recurring references to solar and lunar eclipses (which Leckey has attributed to himself astrologically being a Cancerian or a "moonchild"), and countdowns, "communicate a desire to comprehend the greater universe that is specific to both a particular era and to the artist himself".

== Collections ==
Leckey's work is held in the following permanent collections:

- Tate, London
- Centre Georges Pompidou, Paris
