= Jamie xx =

British DJ and producer (born 1988)

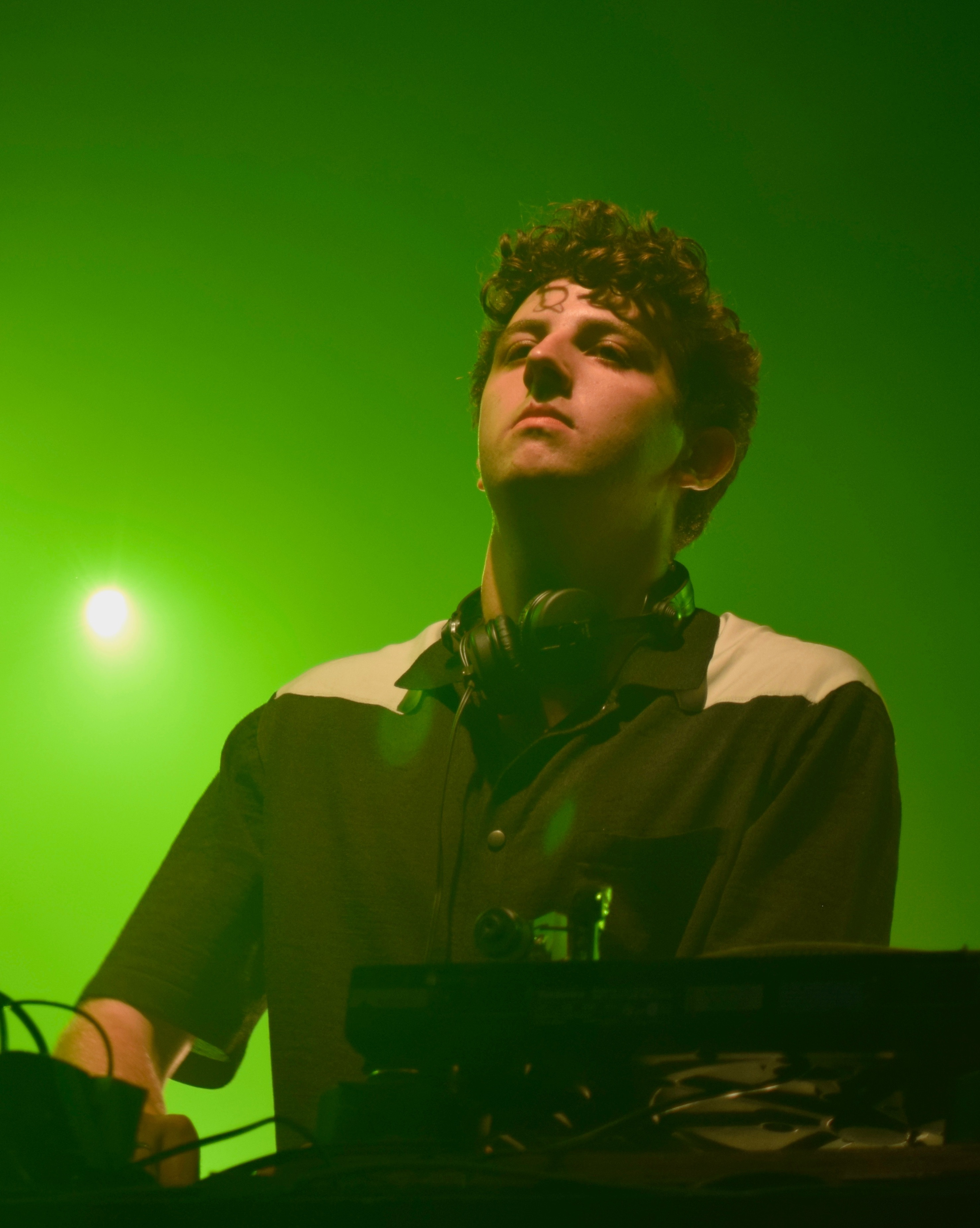
- Jamie xx in 2016

Background information
- Born: James Thomas Smith; 28 October 1988 (age 37); London, England
- Genres: Electronic; indie pop
- Occupations: Musician; DJ; record producer; remixer
- Instruments: Sampler; turntables; drums; keyboards
- Years active: 2006–present
- Labels: Young; XL
- Member of: The xx
- Website: jamiexx.com

James Thomas Smith (born 28 October 1988), known professionally as Jamie xx, is an English musician, DJ, record producer, and remixer. He is known for both his solo work and as a member of the indie pop band the xx.

He has been described as a "driving force" behind the xx, contributing to the group's significant commercial and critical success. As a solo artist, he has been recognised with a 2015 Mercury Prize nomination, and a 2016 Grammy Award for Best Dance/Electronic Album nomination for In Colour.

== Career ==
=== 2006–2009 ===
Smith was born in London on 28 October 1988. His musical career began in 2006 when he joined the xx accompanying old schoolmates Romy Madley Croft, Oliver Sim, and Baria Qureshi of the Elliott School in London, notable for alumni including Hot Chip, Burial, and Four Tet. He was given a MPC for his 18th birthday, which he used in the xx. Smith joined the xx in 2006, a year after the band formed.

Smith first used the stage name Jamie xx in July 2009 in a promotional mix for the band's debut album xx released on the FACT magazine mix series. The mixtape was compiled by Jamie Smith and featured, amongst others, four tracks credited to Jamie xx – one self-production and three remixes. The xx album went on to become platinum in the UK. Afterward, Smith went on to do more remix work for artists like Florence + The Machine, Adele, Jack Peñate and Glasser.

=== 2010–present ===
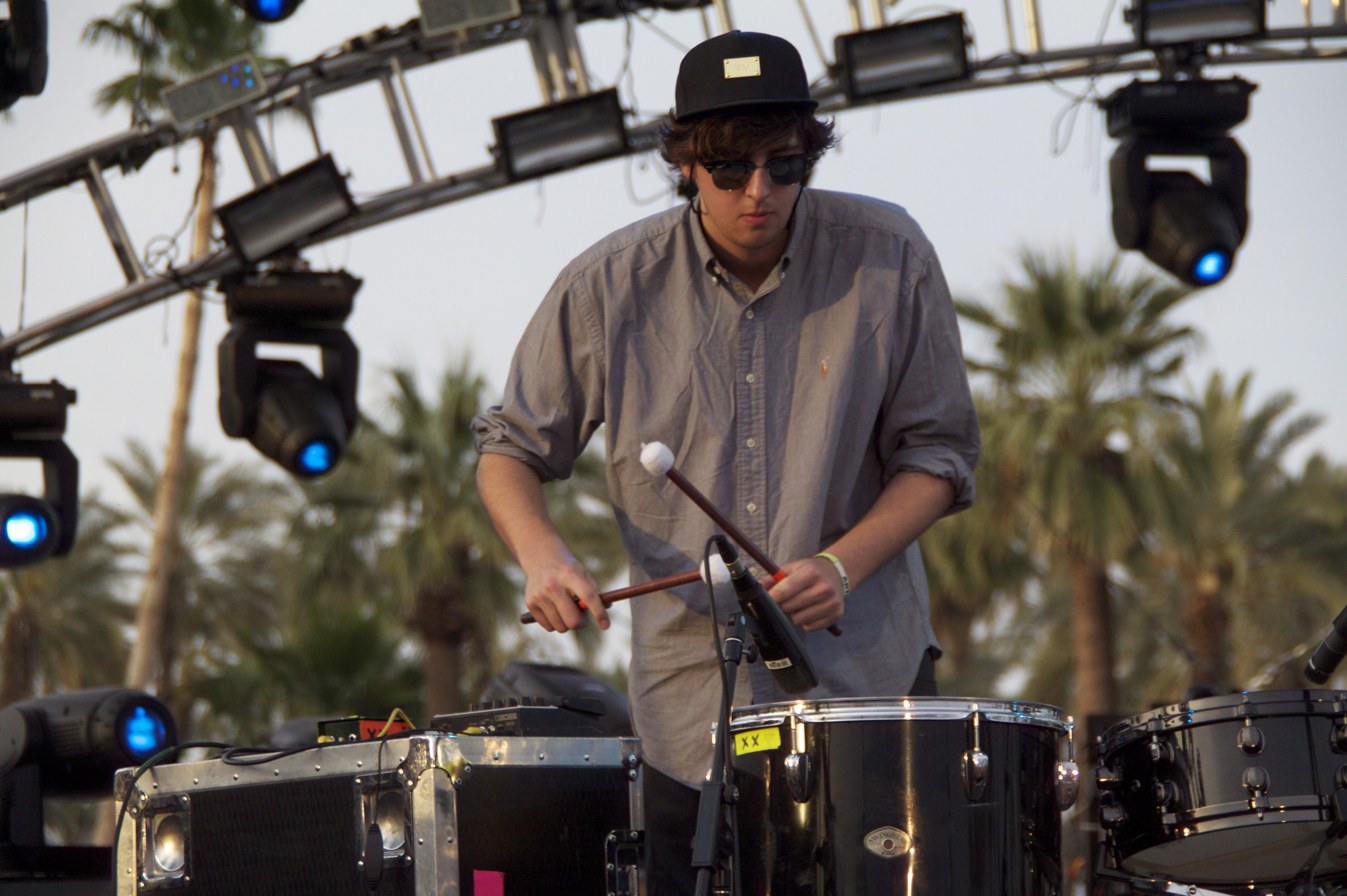
Jamie xx with the xx at Coachella 2010

In late 2010, a Jamie xx remix of the song "NY Is Killing Me" from Gil Scott-Heron's last album I'm New Here aired on radio stations across the UK and Europe. The remix of "I'll Take Care of U" followed in January 2011. Both singles drew the attention of the general public and the critics. They set the way for a 13-track remix album entitled We're New Here, produced entirely by Jamie xx and credited to "Gil Scott-Heron and Jamie xx". The album was released on 21 February 2011 on the XL Recordings label, but a full-album preview could be streamed on the website of The Guardian as early as 14 February. We're New Here received critical acclaim and was named "a cohesive, considered masterpiece in its own right" by BBC's Ele Beattie.

On 6 June 2011, the two-track self-produced single "Far Nearer / Beat For" was released. The song "Far Nearer" was selected Best New Track by Pitchfork, and the double A-side single charted at number 128 on the UK Singles Chart. Later the same year, Smith produced the title track off Drake's second album, Take Care, which features Rihanna. In addition, Smith helped create several reworks for Radiohead's song "Bloom" which were released on a remix album entitled TKOL RMX 1234567. He also co-produced the song "When It's All Over" with Alicia Keys on her Girl on Fire album. In 2014, he announced an upcoming collaboration with John Talabot on Tim Sweeney's Beats in Space online radio show. In 2014, he released the singles "Girl/Sleep Sound" and "All Under One Roof Raving".

On 27 March 2015, he released two singles: "Loud Places", featuring the xx's Romy Madley Croft, and "Gosh". On the same day he also announced that his debut album, In Colour, would be out on 1 June 2015. Ahead of its release, In Colour was streamed on iTunes as a preview with album-spanning visuals that 'reacted' to each sound. It was ultimately released on 29 May 2015 to widespread critical acclaim, debuting at number three on the UK Albums Chart and receiving nominations for the 2015 Mercury Prize and for Best Dance/Electronic Album at the 58th Grammy Awards.

Jamie xx composed the score for a ballet, Tree of Codes, commissioned by Manchester International Festival for its 2015 edition. Based on a novel of the same name by Jonathan Safran Foer, the ballet was choreographed by Wayne McGregor and had a set created by Olafur Eliasson.

In 2020, he released his first single in five years, "Idontknow", which received positive to lukewarm reception from critics. He was credited on Tyler, the Creator's 2021 album Call Me If You Get Lost as a co-producer on the track "RISE!".

Jamie xx has worked on each of his The xx bandmates' respective solo albums: he produced Oliver Sim's Hideous Bastard (2022), and co-produced Romy's Mid Air (2023).

On 20 September 2024, Jamie xx released his second album In Waves on the independent Young record label. The album featured a collaboration with his bandmates Romy and Oliver Sim, "Waited All Night", which had been tease in Jamie xx's set at Glastonbury prior to its release. Other notable tracks from the album include "Baddy on the Floor" featuring Honey Dijon, "All You Children" featuring The Avalanches, and "Life" featuring Robyn (who had also joined Jamie on stage in his Glastonbury set). In Waves was highly rated by critics, scoring 84 out of 100 on Metacritics based on 18 critics' reviews.

The release of In Waves was marked with a tour of intimate record store performances in Liverpool, Manchester, Brighton, and Bristol between 20th and 23rd September 2024. Following this was two sold-out shows at Alexandra Palace on 25th and 26th September 2024, one of which was added due to "phenomenal demand".

== Personal life ==
Jamie xx has previously attributed his interest in dance music to his two uncles who worked as DJs. Within his immediate family, his mother was a fan of Stax Records and his father was a folk-rock drummer in the 1970s.

=== Philanthropy ===
Jamie xx has supported a number of charitable causes, especially through performing fundraising gigs.

In 2016, Jamie xx headlined a benefit concert organised by One for the Boys, a male cancer charity co-founded by Sofia David and Samuel L. Jackson.

In 2019, Jamie xx played a charity gig at The Cause to raise money for mental health charities Mind in Haringey and CALM.

In January 2025, Jamie xx performed a special matinée concert to raise funds for California wildfires' relief efforts. Proceeds from the gig, held at The Shrine Expo Hall, were split between ClientEarth, California Fire Foundation and Extreme Weather Survivors.

In September 2025, Jamie xx performed at the Together for Palestine benefit concert organised by Brian Eno at Wembley arena. Jamie xx opened the concert with a back-to-back set with Samaʼ Abdulhadi, a Palestinian techno DJ. The concert was sold out and reportedly raised over £1.4 million (excluding money raised following the conclusion of the event). Proceeds of the concert were donated to Palestinian-led organisations that provide front-line aid, namely Taawon, Palestine Children’s Relief Fund and Palestinian Medical Relief Society.

== Discography ==
=== Studio albums ===
| Title | Album details | Peak chart positions | | | | | | | | | | Certifications |
| Title | Album details | UK | AUS | BEL (FL) | CAN | FRA | GER | IRE | NED | NZ | US | Certifications |
|---|---|---|---|---|---|---|---|---|---|---|---|---|
| We're New Here (with Gil-Scott Heron) | Released: 21 February 2011; Label: XL, Young Turks; Formats: CD, LP, digital download | 33 | — (Note: We're New Here did not enter the Australian ARIA Albums Chart but peaked at number seven on the ARIA Hitseekers Chart.) | 44 | — | 38 | — | 42 | — | — | — | |
| In Colour | Released: 29 May 2015; Label: Young Turks; Formats: CD, LP, digital download | 3 | 2 | 4 | 9 | 26 | 15 | 5 | 4 | 7 | 21 | BPI: Gold; MC: Gold; RMNZ: Gold |
| In Waves | Released: 20 September 2024; Label: Young; Format: CD, LP, digital download, streaming | 5 | 10 | 2 | — | 54 | 17 | 26 | 22 | 11 | 146 | |
"—" denotes a recording that did not chart or was not released in that territory.

=== Singles ===
| Title | Year | Peak chart positions | | | | | | | | | | Certifications | Album |
| Title | Year | UK | AUS | BEL (FL) Tip | BEL (WA) Tip | FIN Air. | FRA | NED Tip | NZ Hot | SCO | US Dance | Certifications | Album |
|---|---|---|---|---|---|---|---|---|---|---|---|---|---|
| "NY Is Killing Me" | 2010 | — | — | — | — | — | — | — | — | — | — | | We're New Here (with Gil-Scott Heron) |
| "I'll Take Care of U" | 2011 | — | — | — | — | — | — | — | — | — | — | | We're New Here (with Gil-Scott Heron) |
| "Far Nearer / Beat For" | 2011 | 128 | — | — | — | — | — | — | — | — | — | | Non-album single |
| "Girl / Sleep Sound" | 2014 | 152 | — | — | — | — | — | — | — | — | — | | In Colour |
| "All Under One Roof Raving" | 2014 | 123 | — | — | — | — | 199 | — | — | — | — | | Non-album single |
| "Loud Places" (featuring Romy) | 2015 | 62 | 103 | 3 | 36 | — | 55 | — | — | 41 | — | BPI: Gold; MC: Gold; RMNZ: Gold | In Colour |
| "Gosh" | 2015 | — | — | — | — | — | — | — | — | — | 46 | | In Colour |
| "I Know There's Gonna Be (Good Times)" (featuring Young Thug and Popcaan) | 2015 | 115 | 90 | 5 | 35 | 65 | — | 1 | — | — | — | BPI: Gold; MC: Platinum; RIAA: Gold; RMNZ: Gold | In Colour |
| "Idontknow" | 2020 | — (Note: "Idontknow" did not enter the UK Singles Chart, but peaked at number 48 on the UK Singles Sales Chart Top 100.) | — | — (Note: "Idontknow" did not enter the Flanders Ultratop 50, but charted as an "extra tip" on the Ultratip chart.) | — | — | — | — | — | 60 | 26 | | Non-album singles |
| "Let's Do It Again" | 2022 | — (Note: "Let's Do It Again" did not enter the UK Singles Chart, but peaked at number 94 on the UK Singles Sales Chart Top 100.) | — | — | — | — | — | — | — | — | 31 | | Non-album singles |
| "Kill Dem" | 2022 | — (Note: "Kill Dem" did not enter the UK Singles Chart, but peaked at number 84 on the UK Singles Sales Chart Top 100.) | — | — | — | — | — | — | — | — | — | | Non-album singles |
| "It's So Good" | 2024 | — (Note: "It's So Good" did not enter the UK Singles Chart, but peaked at number 93 on the UK Singles Sales Chart Top 100.) | — | — | — | — | — | — | 39 | — | — | | Non-album singles |
| "Baddy on the Floor" (featuring Honey Dijon) | 2024 | — (Note: "Baddy on the Floor" did not enter the UK Singles Chart, but peaked at number 88 on the UK Singles Downloads Chart.) | — | — | — | — | — | — | 31 | — | 40 | | In Waves |
| "Treat Each Other Right" | 2024 | — | — | — | — | — | — | — | — | — | — | | In Waves |
| "Life" (with Robyn) | 2024 | — | — | — | — | — | — | — | — | — | — | | In Waves |
| "All You Children" (featuring The Avalanches) | 2024 | — | — | — | — | — | — | — | — | — | — | | In Waves |
| "Dafodil" (with Kelsey Lu, John Glacier and Panda Bear) | 2024 | — | — | — | — | — | — | — | — | — | — | | In Waves |
| "Waited All Night" (featuring Romy and Oliver Sim) | 2024 | — (Note: "Waited All Night" did not enter the UK Singles Chart, but peaked at number 88 on the UK Singles Update Chart.) | — | — | — | — | — | — | 18 | — | 24 | | In Waves |
| "Dream Night" | 2025 | — | — | — | — | — | — | — | — | — | — | | Non-album single |
"—" denotes a recording that did not chart or was not released in that territory.

=== Other charted songs ===
| Title | Year | Peak chart positions | | | Album |
| Title | Year | UK Indie | BEL (FL) Tip | NZ Hot | Album |
|---|---|---|---|---|---|
| "SeeSaw" (featuring Romy) | 2015 | 21 | — | — | In Colour |
| "Obvs" | 2015 | 25 | — | — | In Colour |
| "Just Saying" | 2015 | 42 | — | — | In Colour |
| "Stranger in a Room" (featuring Oliver Sim) | 2015 | 29 | 10 | — | In Colour |
| "Hold Tight" | 2015 | 38 | — | — | In Colour |
| "The Rest Is Noise" | 2015 | 35 | — | — | In Colour |
| "Wanna" | 2024 | — | — | 31 | In Waves |
| "Still Summer" | 2024 | — | — | 39 | In Waves |
"—" denotes a recording that did not chart or was not released in that territory.

=== Other tracks ===
| Year | Title | Date | Info |
|---|---|---|---|
| 2011 | "Progress" | 7 October 2011 | RizLab Permance live |
| 2011 | "Touch Me" (with Yasmin) | 20 February 2011 | Jamie XX mix on BBC 6 Music |
| 2012 | "Touch Me" (Instrumental) | 31 January 2012 | Young Turks Takeover on FBi Radio |
| 2014 | "Continuum" (with Four Tet, Koreless and John Talabot) | 22 November 2014 | Continuum (Soundtrack) |
| 2014 | "Sunrise" | 22 November 2014 | Continuum (Soundtrack) |
| 2016 | "Oh Gosh" (with Elf Kid) | 13 May 2016 | Vocal version of "Gosh" |
| 2020 | "Idontpiano" | 25 April 2020 | Piano version of "Idontknow" |

=== Remixes ===
| Year | Artist | Song | Title |
|---|---|---|---|
| 2009 | Florence and the Machine | "You've Got the Love" | Jamie xx Re-work featuring the xx |
| 2009 | Jack Penate | "Pull My Heart Away" | Jamie xx Remix |
| 2009 | The xx | "Basic Space" | Jamie xx Space Bass Mix |
| 2009 | The xx | "Blood Red Moon" | Jamie xx Bootleg |
| 2009 | The xx | "Hot Like Fire" | Jamie xx Edit |
| 2009 | The xx | "Islands" | Jamie xx Remix |
| 2010 | Eliza Doolittle | "Moneybox" | Jamie xx Remix |
| 2010 | Glasser | "Tremel" | Jamie xx Remix |
| 2010 | Nosaj Thing | "Fog" | Jamie xx Remix |
| 2011 | Adele | "Rolling in the Deep" | Jamie xx Shuffle |
| 2011 | FaltyDL | "Hip Love" | Jamie xx Rework |
| 2011 | Holly Miranda | "Slow Burn Treason" | Jamie xx Remix |
| 2011 | Radiohead | "Bloom" | Jamie xx Rework; Jamie xx Rework Pt. 3 |
| 2011 | Rui da Silva | "Touch Me" | Jamie xx Remix |
| 2012 | Four Tet | "Lion" | Jamie xx Remix |
| 2012 | The xx | "Reconsider" | Jamie xx Remix |
| 2012 | The xx | "Sunset" | Jamie xx Edit |
| 2013 | The xx | "Missing" | Jamie xx Remix |
| 2017 | The xx | "On Hold" | Jamie xx Remix |
| 2022 | Oliver Sim | "GMT" | Jamie xx Remix |
| 2026 | Robyn | "Dopamine" | Jamie xx Remix |

== Awards and nominations ==
| Year | Awards | Work | Category | Result |
|---|---|---|---|---|
| 2011 | BT Digital Music Awards | Gil Scott-Heron & Jamie xx: Album Transmitter | Best Artist Promotion | Nominated |
| 2011 | Rober Awards Music Prize | Gil Scott-Heron & Jamie xx | Best Soul/R&B | Nominated |
| 2012 | The Music Producers Guild Awards | Himself | Remixer of the Year | Won |
| 2013 | The Music Producers Guild Awards | Himself | Remixer of the Year | Nominated |
| 2014 | Q Awards | "Sleep Sound" | Best Video | Won |
| 2015 | Q Awards | In Colour | Best Album | Nominated |
| 2015 | MOBO Awards | In Colour | Best Album | Nominated |
| 2015 | Rober Awards Music Poll | Himself | Best Male Artist | Nominated |
| 2015 | Rober Awards Music Poll | Himself | Best Electronica | Nominated |
| 2015 | Rober Awards Music Poll | "I Know There's Gonna Be (Good Times)" (featuring Young Thug and Popcaan) | Song of the Year | Nominated |
| 2015 | Rober Awards Music Poll | "I Know There's Gonna Be (Good Times)" (featuring Young Thug and Popcaan) | Floorfiller of the Year | Nominated |
| 2015 | AIM Independent Music Awards | "Loud Places" | Independent Video of the Year | Nominated |
| 2015 | International Dance Music Awards | Himself | Best Indie Dance/Underground DJ | Nominated |
| 2015 | Mercury Prize | In Colour | Album of the Year | Shortlisted |
| 2016 | Grammy Awards | In Colour | Best Dance/Electronic Album | Nominated |
| 2016 | Ivor Novello Awards | In Colour | Album Award | Nominated |
| 2016 | Elle Style Awards | In Colour | Album of the Year | Won |
| 2016 | Brit Awards | In Colour | British Album of the Year | Nominated |
| 2016 | Brit Awards | Himself | British Male Solo Artist | Nominated |
| 2016 | International Dance Music Awards | Himself | Best Indie Dance/Underground DJ | Won |
| 2016 | International Dance Music Awards | "Loud Places" | Best Alternative/Indie Rock Dance Track | Nominated |
| 2016 | UK Music Video Awards | "Gosh" | Video of the Year | Won |
| 2016 | UK Music Video Awards | "Gosh" | Best Alternative Video – UK | Won |
| 2016 | Camerimage | "Gosh" | Best Music Video | Nominated |
| 2016 | Rober Awards Music Poll | "Gosh" | Best Promo Video | Nominated |
| 2017 | D&AD Awards | "Gosh" | Best Music Video | Yellow Pencil |
| 2017 | Grammy Awards | "Gosh" | Best Music Video | Nominated |
| 2023 | Hungarian Music Awards | "Kill Dem"/"Let's Do It Again" | Foreign Electronic Music Album or Recording of the Year | Nominated |
| 2025 | Hungarian Music Awards | In Waves | Foreign Electronic Album or Recording of the Year | Nominated |
| 2025 | Clio Awards | In Waves | Mixed Campaign | Bronze |
| 2025 | BRIT Awards | Himself | British Artist of the Year | Nominated |
| 2026 | Hungarian Music Awards | "Dream Night" / "Waited All Night" (Solomun Remixes) | Foreign Electronic Album or Recording of the Year | Nominated |
