= I'm New Here =

Album by Gil Scott-Heron

Studio album by Gil Scott-Heron
- Released: February 8, 2010
- Studios: XL, London
- Genres: Blues; electronica; post-industrial; spoken word; folk; trip hop
- Length: 28:25
- Label: XL
- Producer: Richard Russell

Gil Scott-Heron chronology
Spirits (1994)	I'm New Here (2010)	We're New Here (2011)

Singles from I'm New Here
- 1. "Me and the Devil" Released: February 22, 2010; 2. "New York Is Killing Me" Released: April 26, 2010; 3. "I'm New Here" Released: July 19, 2010

I'm New Here is the 15th and final studio album by American vocalist and pianist Gil Scott-Heron. It was released on February 8, 2010, by XL Recordings and was his first release of original music in 16 years, following a period of personal and legal troubles with drug addiction.

The record was produced by XL owner Richard Russell, who was influenced by the 2009 self-titled debut album of English band the xx. I'm New Here is a post-industrial blues album, with spoken word folk songs and trip hop interludes.

I'm New Here received positive reviews from most critics and sold 3,700 copies in the US in its first week. It was promoted with the single "Me and the Devil", an adaptation of blues musician Robert Johnson's "Me and the Devil Blues" (1937). A remix of the album, titled We're New Here, was produced by the xx's Jamie xx and released by XL in 2011.

== Musical style ==
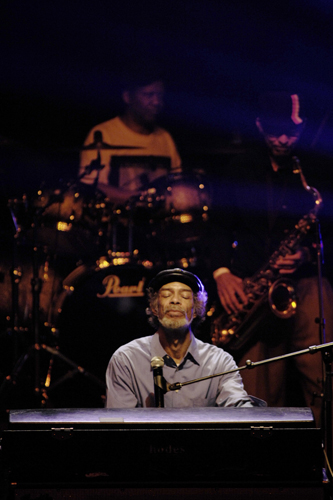
Scott-Heron sang and played piano on the album.

I'm New Here is a departure from the rhythmic, jazz-funk and soul style of Scott-Heron's previous work, and embraces an acoustic and electronic minimal sound. Musically, I'm New Here incorporates blues, folk, trip hop, and electronica styles. Music writer Patrick Taylor notes of the album's style, "It's the ragged, warts-and-all approach of the blues versus the more refined jazz soul style he favored in the seventies". It also contains some musical elements of dubstep, electro, and ambient music. Greg Kot from the Chicago Tribune called it a "post-modern" blues album, while Rolling Stone magazine's Will Hermes described it as "a steely blues record at heart — the sound of a damaged man staring in the mirror without self-pity but not without hope". City Pages critic Rick Mason deemed the music "hard-edged post-industrial blues".

The album contains a sonically dark and gritty soundscape characterized by low-tone synths and spatial beats. Due to its sparse sound and minimalist production, music writers have compared it to singer-songwriter Johnny Cash's American Recordings albums with producer Rick Rubin. Crawdaddy!'s David MacFadden-Elliott wrote that Richard Russell's production finds "deep electronic grooves that still contain hints of soul and gospel music", while critic Neil McCormick noted that the album's musical setting produced by Russell "blends dubby beats with spoken word and raw, confessional blues", describing the musical fusion as "like Massive Attack jamming with Robert Johnson and Allen Ginsberg".

Scott-Heron's baritone vocals on the album stylistically range from spoken word to blues-oriented crooning. Music writers have noted that Scott-Heron's vocal ability has changed, perceiving it as rougher, slurred, and aged. Simon Price of The Independent described his voice on the album as "bourbon-soaked".

== Themes ==
I'm New Here features introspective, confessional lyrics expressing themes of regret, reconciliation, and redemption, which deviate from his earlier music's agitprop lyrics and social, political themes. On Scott-Heron's thematic departure, critic Paul Trynka wrote "The man who depicted Winter in America is now in his own autumn; a season replete with both beauty and sadness". The Skinny's Bram Gieben perceived "flashes of Burroughs-like darkness, the wry humour of post-addiction Richard Pryor" in Scott-Heron's performance. Although Scott-Heron's lyrics concerning his bleak life experiences are understated and reflective, they express pride, dignity, defiance, and unapologetic confession. According to Robert Ferguson of Drowned in Sound, Scott-Heron expresses "confession, but no apology" to "pick over the bones of his life, acknowledging the hard times and his own mistakes, but standing proud of all they have led him to become".

"Your Soul and Mine"
The spoken word piece based on Scott-Heron's 1970 poem "The Vulture" features dubstep-styled sonics over a cello loop.

"New York Is Killing Me"
Written as a 12-bar blues, the song is about alienation in New York City and is built around handclaps and distorted bass.

The album's bookending and two-part poem "On Coming from a Broken Home" features piano and a sampled string loop from Kanye West's "Flashing Lights" (2007). It is a tribute to the women in his family, particularly Scott-Heron's grandmother Lily Scott, with whom he was sent to live as a child in Tennessee. The song reflects on his upbringing around strong female figures and challenges the sociological perception of a broken home: "Womenfolk raised me, and I was full-grown before I knew I came from a broken home". It defends Scott-Heron's upbringing and arguing that his grandmother's love and devotion taught him passionate humanity, despite lacking of a positive male figure. According to music writers, "On Coming from a Broken Home" introduces and concludes the album's prominent theme of unapologetic confession.

"Your Soul and Mine" adapts lyrics from Scott-Heron's spoken word piece "The Vulture", originally featured on Small Talk at 125th and Lenox (1970). It contains a dubstep-styled collage of effects over a cello loop similar to the style of Burial and Massive Attack. The song's blank verse recitation discusses the evils, represented as a metaphorical vulture, that inhabit and destroy African-American ghettos. The "vulture" also represents death from Scott-Heron's point of view, who concludes the song with the theme of defiance.

== Release and promotion ==
I'm New Here was released by XL Recordings on February 8, 2010, in the United Kingdom and the following day in the United States. It had first-week sales of 3,700 copies in the US. It entered at number 28 on Billboard's Top Independent Albums, at number 6 on its Top Jazz Albums, and at number 38 on its Top R&B/Hip-Hop Albums chart. The album also entered at number 35 in Ireland and at number 39 in the United Kingdom. It also debuted at number six on the UK R&B Chart. It spent two to three weeks on most international charts. In 2010, it was awarded a silver certification from the Independent Music Companies Association, which indicated sales of at least 30,000 copies throughout Europe.

The album's lead single, "Me and the Devil", was released on February 22, 2010, as a 7" and music download. It did not chart as a single on the Billboard charts. On September 26, British director Chris Cunningham premiered the 10-minute film New York Is Killing Me at the Museum of Modern Art, projected on three screens side by side. For this "audio-visual remix" he replaced 90% of Scott-Heron's musical track with train sounds and environmental recordings to create a "musique concrète" version of the original composition.

== Critical reception ==
Professional ratings
Aggregate scores
Source	Rating
AnyDecentMusic?	7.8/10
Metacritic	78/100
Review scores
Source	Rating
AllMusic	4/5 stars
The Daily Telegraph	4/5 stars
The Guardian	4/5 stars
The Independent	4/5 stars
Mojo	4/5 stars
NME	9/10
Pitchfork	8.5/10
Q	4/5 stars
Rolling Stone	3/5 stars
Spin	7/10

I'm New Here was met with mostly positive reviews from critics. At Metacritic, which assigns a normalized rating out of 100 to reviews from mainstream publications, the album received an average score of 78, based on 28 reviews.

Reviewing the album for Slant Magazine, Jesse Cataldo called it "post-structural, indefinably plotted" and "masterfully stark", while Dan Cairns of The Sunday Times regarded it as "an extraordinarily powerful album" featuring "superb Scott-Heron originals". AllMusic's Thom Jurek said it "contains the artful immediacy that distinguishes Scott-Heron’s best art". Siddharta Mitter from The Boston Globe believed Russell's "swirling miasma of sound wholly suits Scott-Heron’s mood, which is angry yet humble, and even more his voice, which is rich and intent as ever". In The Daily Telegraph, Neil McCormick found the lyrics to be of "depth, wisdom and experience", delivered in "a voice rich with musicality, all set in a sonic context that locates him in the present moment". Rupert Howe of Q said Russell's arrangements "brilliantly frame [Scott-Heron]'s rich burr and terse street poetry with brooding electronica and stark blues handclaps". In the opinion of The Village Voice's Stacey Anderson, "it's more emotional, more optimistic, than his past political provocations, and he hasn't sounded this lively in ages". Pitchfork ranked I'm New Here number 45 on its list of the Top 50 Albums of 2010, and number 176 on its list of the 200 Best Albums of the 2010s. It also placed "New York Is Killing Me" at number 141 on its list of "The 200 Best Songs of the 2010s."

Some reviewers were less enthusiastic. Writing for Chicago Sun-Times, Jim DeRogatis deemed the album's sound "alien and unsuccessful" while describing Scott-Heron's performance as "bland philosophizing and surprisingly hollow personal reflections". Will Layman from PopMatters said it was "a thin affair—musically weak and lyrically narrow" while finding its material "unimaginative".

== Reworkings ==
The entire album has been reworked twice: as We're New Here by Jamie xx, released in 2011, and as We're New Again: A Reimagining by Makaya McCraven, released in 2020.

== Track listing ==
All tracks are written by Gil Scott-Heron, except where noted.

No.	Title	Writer(s)	Length
1.	"On Coming from a Broken Home (Part 1)"		2:20
2.	"Me and the Devil"	Robert Johnson	3:33
3.	"I'm New Here"	Bill Callahan (album track from A River Ain't Too Much to Love)	3:33
4.	"Your Soul and Mine"	Richard Russell, Scott-Heron	2:02
5.	"Parents" (Interlude)		0:18
6.	"I'll Take Care of You"	Brook Benton	2:58
7.	"Being Blessed" (Interlude)		0:12
8.	"Where Did the Night Go"		1:14
9.	"I Was Guided" (Interlude)		0:14
10.	"New York Is Killing Me"		4:29
11.	"Certain Things" (Interlude)		0:08
12.	"Running"	Russell, Scott-Heron	2:00
13.	"The Crutch"	Russell, Scott-Heron	2:44
14.	"I've Been Me" (Interlude)		0:16
15.	"On Coming from a Broken Home (Part 2)"		2:15

Limited edition bonus tracks
No.	Title	Length
16.	"Piano Player" (Intro)	0:24
17.	"Home Is Where the Hatred Is"	3:20
18.	"Winter in America"	5:33
19.	"Jazz" (Interlude)	3:24
20.	"Is That Jazz"	4:35
21.	"A Place to Go" (Interlude)	0:49
22.	"My Cloud"	3:55

- Tracks 1 and 15 contain a sample from "Flashing Lights" by Kanye West.

== Personnel ==
Credits for I'm New Here adapted from liner notes.

- Gil Scott-Heron – piano, vocals
- Damon Albarn – keyboards
- Mike Block – strings
- Chris Cunningham – guitar, synthesizer
- Tiona Hall – backing vocals
- Michelle Hutcherson – backing vocals
- Kim Jordan – backing vocals, piano
- Phil Lee – artwork
- Christiana Liberis – strings

- Rodaidh McDonald – additional recording and mixing
- Ichiho Nishiki – engineer
- Mischa Richter – artwork
- Richard Russell – producer, cover photo
- Tyria Stokes – backing vocals
- Mary Jo Stilp – strings
- Pat Sullivan – guitar
- Una Tone – strings
- Lawson White – engineer, string arrangements

== Charts ==
Chart performance for I'm New Here
Chart (2010)	Peak position
Belgian Albums (Ultratop Flanders)	62
Dutch Albums (Album Top 100)	88
French Albums (SNEP)	100
Greek Albums (IFPI)	19
Irish Albums (IRMA)	30
Swiss Albums (Schweizer Hitparade)	97
UK Albums (Official Charts)	39
UK R&B Albums (Official Charts)	6
US Independent Albums (Billboard)	28
US Top Jazz Albums (Billboard)	5
US Top R&B/Hip-Hop Albums (Billboard)	38
