= The xx discography =

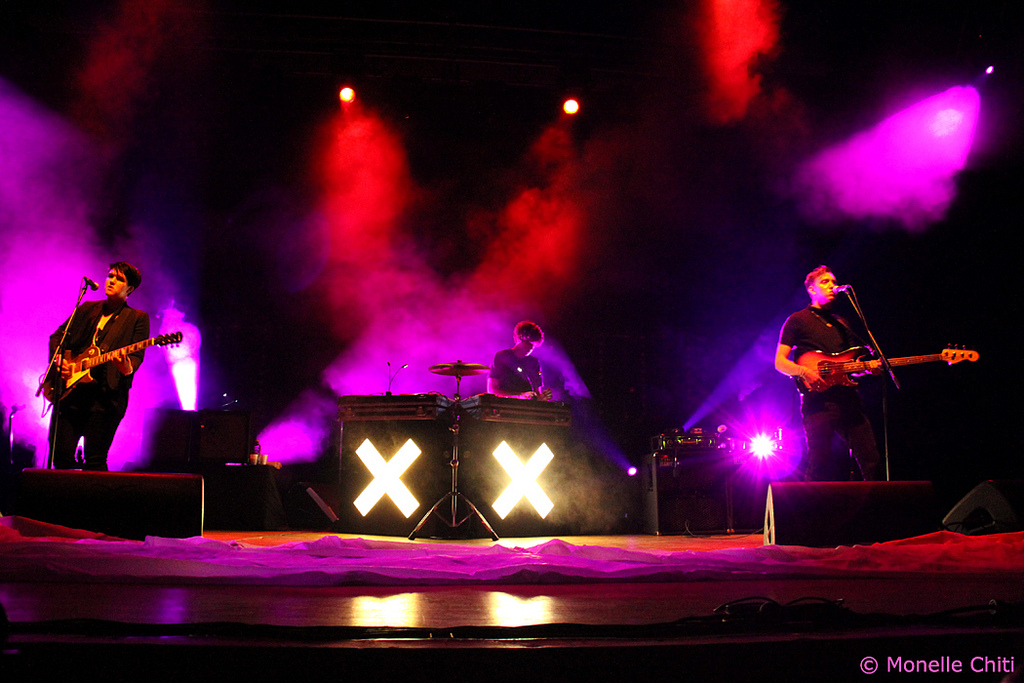
- The xx performing at the Alcatraz in Milan, Italy, in July 2010
- Studio albums: 3
- Extended plays: 5
- Singles: 12
- Music videos: 10

The xx, an English indie pop band, have released three studio albums, one remix album, five extended plays, 12 singles and 10 music videos.

== Albums ==
=== Studio albums ===
List of studio albums, with selected chart positions, sales figures and certifications
Title	Details	Peak chart positions										Sales	Certifications
Title	Details	UK	AUS	BEL (FL)	CAN	FRA	GER	IRE	NZ	SWI	US	Sales	Certifications
xx	Released: 14 August 2009; Label: Young Turks; Formats: CD, LP, digital download	3	40	9	91	35	54	14	13	43	92	UK: 565,934; US: 350,000	BPI: 2× Platinum; ARIA: Gold; BEA: Gold; BVMI: Gold; MC: Platinum; RIAA: Gold; RMNZ: Platinum
Coexist	Released: 5 September 2012; Label: Young Turks; Formats: CD, LP, digital download	1	2	1	2	2	3	3	1	1	5	UK: 268,381	BPI: Platinum; BEA: Gold; BVMI: Gold; MC: Gold; RMNZ: Gold
I See You	Released: 13 January 2017; Label: Young Turks; Formats: CD, LP, digital download	1	1	1	2	5	1	1	3	2	2	UK: 52,148; US: 36,000	BPI: Gold; RMNZ: Gold

=== Remix albums ===
List of remix albums, with selected chart positions
Title	Details	Peak chart positions
Title	Details	JPN
Remixes	Released: 19 January 2018; Label: Young Turks; Format: CD	125

== Extended plays ==
Title	Details
Tour Only EP	Released: 12 January 2010; Label: Young Turks; Format: 7-inch vinyl
iTunes Live from SoHo	Released: 9 March 2010; Label: XL; Format: Digital download
iTunes Festival: London 2010	Released: 20 July 2010; Label: Young Turks; Format: Digital download
The xxmas	Released: 3 January 2013; Label: Young Turks; Format: Digital download
Hivern Remixes	Released: 11 November 2013; Label: Young Turks; Formats: 12-inch vinyl, digital download

== Singles ==
List of singles, with selected chart positions, showing year released and album name
Title	Year	Peak chart positions										Certifications	Album
Title	Year	UK	AUS	BEL (FL)	FRA	IRE	ITA	MEX	POR	SWI	US Bub.	Certifications	Album
"Crystalised"	2009	108	—	— (Note: "Crystalised" did not enter the Ultratop 50, but peaked at number 17 on the Flemish Back Catalogue Singles chart.)	—	—	93	— (Note: "Crystalised" did not enter the Mexico Airplay chart, but peaked at number 46 on the Mexico Ingles Airplay chart.)	—	—	—	BPI: Gold; FIMI: Gold; MC: Gold	xx
"Basic Space"	2009	—	—	—	—	—	—	— (Note: "Basic Space" did not enter the Mexico Airplay chart, but peaked at number 15 on the Mexico Ingles Airplay chart.)	—	—	—		xx
"Islands"	2009	34	—	16	90	—	—	— (Note: "Islands" did not enter the Mexico Airplay chart, but peaked at number 44 on the Mexico Ingles Airplay chart.)	45	—	—	BPI: Gold; MC: Gold	xx
"VCR"	2010	132	—	—	—	—	—	— (Note: "VCR" did not enter the Mexico Airplay chart, but peaked at number 8 on the Mexico Ingles Airplay chart.)	—	—	—	BPI: Silver	xx
"Angels"	2012	43	46	29	102	70	—	— (Note: "Angels" did not enter the Mexico Airplay chart, but peaked at number 36 on the Mexico Ingles Airplay chart.)	26	—	3	BPI: Gold; MC: Gold	Coexist
"Chained"	2012	— (Note: "Chained" did not enter the UK Singles Chart, but peaked at number 20 on the UK Physical Singles Chart.)	—	47	—	—	—	— (Note: "Chained" did not enter the Mexico Airplay chart, but peaked at number 42 on the Mexico Ingles Airplay chart.)	—	—	—		Coexist
"Sunset"	2013	— (Note: "Sunset" did not enter the UK Singles Chart, but peaked at number 45 on the UK Streaming Chart.)	—	—	75	—	—	— (Note: "Sunset" did not enter the Mexico Airplay chart, but peaked at number 40 on the Mexico Ingles Airplay chart.)	19	—	19		Coexist
"Fiction"	2013	— (Note: "Fiction" did not enter the UK Singles Chart, but peaked at number 8 on the UK Physical Singles Chart.)	—	— (Note: "Fiction" did not enter the Ultratop 50, but peaked at number 42 on the Flemish Ultratip chart.)	—	—	—	—	—	—	—		Coexist
"On Hold"	2016	34	45	11	52	50	55	44	49	50	2	BPI: Gold; ARIA: Gold; BEA: Gold; FIMI: Gold; MC: Gold	I See You
"Say Something Loving"	2017	60	—	— (Note: "Say Something Loving" did not enter the Ultratop 50, but peaked at number four on the Flemish Ultratip chart.)	130	70	—	—	42	77	—		I See You
"I Dare You"	2017	100	—	— (Note: "I Dare You" did not enter the Ultratop 50, but peaked at number five on the Flemish Ultratip chart.)	142	—	—	— (Note: "I Dare You" did not enter the Mexico Airplay chart, but peaked at number 16 on the Mexico Ingles Airplay chart.)	60	—	—		I See You
"Dangerous"	2017	75	—	— (Note: "Dangerous" did not enter the Ultratop 50, but peaked at number 26 on the Flemish Ultratip chart.)	—	82	—	— (Note: "Dangerous" did not enter the Mexico Airplay chart, but peaked at number 39 on the Mexico Ingles Airplay chart.)	57	91	—		I See You
"—" denotes a recording that did not chart or was not released in that territory.

== Other charted songs ==
List of other charted songs, with selected chart positions, showing year released and album name
Title	Year	Peak chart positions										Certifications	Album
Title	Year	UK	UK Indie	BEL (FL)	FRA	HUN	IRE	ITA	POR	SPA	US Rock	Certifications	Album
"Intro"	2010	129	11	— (Note: "Intro" did not enter the Ultratop 50, but peaked at number one on the Flemish Back Catalogue Singles chart.)	96	34	62	59	88	50	— (Note: "Intro" did not chart on the Hot Rock Songs chart, but peaked at number 32 on the Rock Digital Songs chart.)	BPI: Platinum; FIMI: Platinum; MC: 2× Platinum; RIAA: Platinum	xx
"Heart Skipped a Beat"	2010	—	29	—	—	—	—	—	—	—	—		xx
"Try"	2012	— (Note: "Try" did not enter the UK Singles Chart, but peaked at number 40 on the UK Streaming Chart.)	—	—	—	—	—	—	—	—	—		Coexist
"Reunion"	2012	— (Note: "Reunion" did not enter the UK Singles Chart, but peaked at number 44 on the UK Streaming Chart.)	—	— (Note: "Reunion" did not enter the Ultratop 50, but peaked at number 30 on the Flemish Ultratip chart.)	—	—	—	—	—	—	—		Coexist
"Missing"	2012	— (Note: "Missing" did not enter the UK Singles Chart, but peaked at number 47 on the UK Streaming Chart.)	—	—	—	—	—	—	—	—	—		Coexist
"Tides"	2012	— (Note: "Tides" did not enter the UK Singles Chart, but peaked at number 58 on the UK Streaming Chart.)	—	—	—	—	—	—	—	—	—		Coexist
"Unfold"	2012	— (Note: "Unfold" did not enter the UK Singles Chart, but peaked at number 65 on the UK Streaming Chart.)	—	—	—	—	—	—	—	—	—		Coexist
"Swept Away"	2012	— (Note: "Swept Away" did not enter the UK Singles Chart, but peaked at number 70 on the UK Streaming Chart.)	—	—	—	—	—	—	—	—	—		Coexist
"Our Song"	2012	— (Note: "Our Song" did not enter the UK Singles Chart, but peaked at number 78 on the UK Streaming Chart.)	—	—	—	—	—	—	—	—	—		Coexist
"Lips"	2017	93	9	—	165	—	—	—	56	—	25		I See You
"A Violent Noise"	2017	94	10	—	192	—	—	—	62	—	32		I See You
"Brave for You"	2017	— (Note: "Brave for You" did not enter the UK Singles Chart, but peaked at number 85 on the UK Streaming Chart.)	12	—	—	—	—	—	74	—	41		I See You
"Performance"	2017	— (Note: "Performance" did not enter the UK Singles Chart, but peaked at number 88 on the UK Streaming Chart.)	13	—	—	—	—	—	79	—	37		I See You
"Replica"	2017	— (Note: "Replica" did not enter the UK Singles Chart, but peaked at number 92 on the UK Streaming Chart.)	14	—	—	—	—	—	80	—	36		I See You
"Test Me"	2017	—	21	—	—	—	—	—	—	—	—		I See You
"—" denotes a recording that did not chart or was not released in that territory.

== Guest appearances ==
List of non-single guest appearances, showing year released and album name
Title	Year	Album
"Closer"	2009	Kwesachu Mixtape Vol.1
"Together"	2013	The Great Gatsby: Music from Baz Luhrmann's Film

=== Remixes ===
Song	Year	Artist	Title
"Warrior"	2009	Magic Wands	The xx Remix
"You've Got the Love"	2009	Florence and the Machine	Jamie xx Re-work featuring The xx
"The Afterlife"	2010	Yacht	The xx Remix

== Songwriting and production credits ==
Title	Year	Artist(s)	Album	Contributing member(s)	Credits	Written with	Produced with
"Take Care"	2011	Drake featuring Rihanna	Take Care	Jamie Smith	Co-writer, producer	Aubrey Graham, Noah "40" Shebib, Anthony Palman	40
"Drunk on Love"	2011	Rihanna	Talk That Talk	Jamie Smith, Romy Madley Croft, Oliver Sim, Baria Qureshi	Co-writer	Ester Dean, Mikkel Eriksen, Tor Hermansen	—
"When It's All Over"	2012	Alicia Keys	Girl on Fire	Jamie Smith	Producer	—	Alicia Keys
"REmember"	2013	Mac Miller	Watching Movies with the Sound Off	Oliver Sim	Co-writer	Malcolm McCormick	—
"Share It All"	2014	Jessie Ware	Tough Love	Romy Madley Croft	Co-writer	Jessica Ware	—
"Come We Go"	2016	DJ Koze	Pampa, Vol. I	Jamie Smith	Co-writer, producer	Stefan Kozalla	DJ Koze
"Fingertips"	2016	OneRepublic	Oh My My	Romy Madley Croft	Co-writer	Ryan Tedder, Noel Zancanella, Benjamin Levin	—
"Jupiter"	2017	Kelela	Take Me Apart	Romy Madley Croft	Co-writer	Kelela Mizanekristos	—
"Better"	2017	Kelela	Take Me Apart	Romy Madley Croft	Co-writer	Kelela Mizanekristos, Dominic Salole	—
"Turn to Dust"	2017	Kelela	Take Me Apart	Romy Madley Croft	Co-writer	Kelela Mizanekristos, Alejandro Ghersi, Jack Latham	—
"Big God"	2018	Florence and the Machine	High as Hope	Jamie Smith	Co-writer	Florence Welch	—
"Electricity"	2018	Silk City and Dua Lipa featuring Diplo and Mark Ronson	Non-album single	Romy Madley Croft	Co-writer	Mark Ronson, Thomas Wesley Pentz, Diana Gordon, Dua Lipa, Philip Meckseper, Jacob Olofsson, Rami Dawood, Maxime Picard, Clément Picard	—
"Nothing Breaks Like a Heart"	2018	Mark Ronson featuring Miley Cyrus	Late Night Feelings	Jamie Smith	Producer	—	Mark Ronson, The Picard Brothers
"More / Diamond Ring"	2018	Benny Blanco featuring Ty Dolla Sign and 6lack	Friends Keep Secrets	Romy Madley Croft	Co-writer	Benjamin Levin, Magnus August Hoiberg, Nathan Perez, Jesse Rutherford, Ricardo Valentine, Tyrone Griffin Jr.	—
"Why Hide"	2019	Mark Ronson featuring Diana Gordon	Late Night Feelings	Romy Madley Croft	Co-writer	Mark Ronson, Diana Gordon, Homer Steinweiss, Leon Michels, Nick Movshon	—
"Homegirl"	2019	King Princess	Cheap Queen	Romy Madley Croft	Co-writer	Mikaela Straus, Nick Long	—
"Foreign Car"	2019	Kelsey Lu	Blood	Jamie Smith	Co-producer	—	Rodaidh McDonald
"Why Knock For You"	2019	Kelsey Lu	Blood	Jamie Smith	Co-producer	—	Rodaidh McDonald
"Still Learning"	2020	Halsey	Manic	Romy Madley Croft	Co-writer	Ashley Frangipane, Fred Gibson, Ed Sheeran, Louis Bell	—

== Music videos ==
List of music videos, showing year released and directors
Title	Year	Director(s)	Ref.
"Crystalised"	2009	Alex Flick and Masato Riesser	
"Basic Space"	2009	Anthony Dickenson	
"VCR"	2010	Marcus Söderlund	
"Islands"	2010	Saam Farahmand	
"Angels" (live in Tokyo)	2012	Jamie-James Medina	
"Chained"	2012	Young Replicant	
"Fiction"	2013	Young Replicant	
"On Hold"	2016	Alasdair McLellan	
"Say Something Loving"	2017	Alasdair McLellan	
"I Dare You"	2017	Alasdair McLellan	
