= I See You Tour =

2017–18 concert tour by the xx

- Tour by the xx
- Associated album: I See You
- Start date: February 8, 2017
- End date: July 29, 2018
- Legs: 16
- No. of shows: 59 in Europe; 7 in Latin America; 52 in North America; 13 in Asia; 6 in Oceania; 137 in Total

the xx concert chronology
- Coexist Tour (2012-2013); I See You Tour (2017-2018)

The I See You Tour was the third concert tour by English indie band the xx, in support of their third studio album I See You (2017). The European leg of the tour began in Sweden on 8 February 2017 and concluded on 17 March 2017. The North American leg began on 14 April 2017, as part of Coachella in Indio, California, and continued until 27 May 2017.

== Set list ==
This set list is representative of the performance on 8 March 2017 at the O_{2} Academy Brixton in London, England. It does not represent the set list at all concerts for the duration of the tour.

1. "Say Something Loving"
2. "Crystalised"
3. "Islands"
4. "Lips"
5. "Sunset"
6. "Basic Space"
7. "Performance"
8. "Brave for You"
9. "Infinity"
10. "VCR"
11. "I Dare You"
12. "Dangerous"
13. "Chained"
14. "A Violent Noise"
15. "Fiction"
16. "Shelter"
17. "Loud Places" (Jamie xx cover)
18. "On Hold" (Encore)
19. "Intro" (Encore)
20. "Angels" (Encore)

== Tour dates ==
Date	City	Country	Venue
Part 1 - Europe
February 8, 2017	Stockholm	Sweden	Hovet
February 10, 2017	Copenhagen	Denmark	Forum Copenhagen
February 12, 2017	Hamburg	Germany	Alsterdorfer Sporthalle
February 13, 2017	Amsterdam	Netherlands	AFAS Live
February 14, 2017	Paris	France	Zénith Paris
February 15, 2017	Paris	France	Zénith Paris
February 17, 2017	Strasbourg	France	Zénith de Strasbourg
February 18, 2017	Basel	Switzerland	St. Jakobshalle
February 20, 2017	Milan	Italy	Mediolanum Forum
February 21, 2017	Lyon	France	Halle Tony Garnier
February 23, 2017	Vienna	Austria	Marx Halle
February 24, 2017	Munich	Germany	Zenith
February 25, 2017	Berlin	Germany	Arena Berlin
February 26, 2017	Frankfurt	Germany	Jahrhunderthalle
February 28, 2017	Düsseldorf	Germany	Mitsubishi Electric Halle
March 1, 2017	Brussels	Belgium	Forest National
March 2, 2017	Brussels	Belgium	Forest National
March 4, 2017	Nottingham	England	Motorpoint Arena Nottingham
March 5, 2017	Manchester	England	O_{2} Apollo Manchester
March 6, 2017	Manchester	England	O_{2} Apollo Manchester
March 8, 2017	London	England	O_{2} Academy Brixton
March 9, 2017	London	England	O_{2} Academy Brixton
March 10, 2017	London	England	O_{2} Academy Brixton
March 11, 2017	London	England	O_{2} Academy Brixton
March 13, 2017	London	England	O_{2} Academy Brixton
March 14, 2017	London	England	O_{2} Academy Brixton
March 15, 2017	London	England	O_{2} Academy Brixton
March 17, 2017	Cardiff	Wales	Motorpoint Arena Cardiff
Part 2 - Latin America
March 23, 2017 (Note: The 23 March 2017 concert in Bogotá, Colombia at Parque Deportivo 222 is a part of Estéreo Picnic Festival.)	Bogotá	Colombia	Parque Deportivo 222
March 25, 2017 (Note: The 25 March 2017 concert in São Paulo, Brazil at Autódromo José Carlos Pace is a part of Lollapalooza São Paulo.)	São Paulo	Brazil	Autódromo José Carlos Pace
March 31, 2017 (Note: The 31 March 2017 concert in Buenos Aires, Argentina at Hipódromo de San Isidro is a part of Lollapalooza Buenos Aires.)	Buenos Aires	Argentina	Hipódromo de San Isidro
April 1, 2017 (Note: The 1 April 2017 concert in Santiago, Chile at O'Higgins Park is a part of Lollapalooza Santiago.)	Santiago	Chile	O'Higgins Park
April 4, 2017	Mexico City	Mexico	Pabellon Cuervo
Part 3 - North America
April 14, 2017 (Note: The 14 April 2017 concert in Indio, United States at Empire Polo Club is a part of Coachella Valley Music and Arts Festival.)	Indio	United States	Empire Polo Club
April 15, 2017	San Francisco	United States	Bill Graham Civic Auditorium
April 16, 2017	San Francisco	United States	Bill Graham Civic Auditorium
April 17, 2017	San Francisco	United States	Bill Graham Civic Auditorium
April 19, 2017	Phoenix	United States	Mesa Amphitheater
April 21, 2017 (Note: The 21 April 2017 concert in Indio, United States at Empire Polo Club is a part of Coachella Valley Music and Arts Festival.)	Indio	United States	Empire Polo Club
April 23, 2017	Portland	United States	Theater of the Clouds
April 24, 2017	Seattle	United States	WaMu Theater
April 25, 2017	Vancouver	Canada	Doug Mitchell Thunderbird Sports Centre
April 28, 2017	St. Paul	United States	Palace Theatre
April 29, 2017	Milwaukee	United States	Eagles Ballroom
May 1, 2017	Chicago	United States	Aragon Ballroom
May 2, 2017	Detroit	United States	Detroit Masonic Temple
May 3, 2017	Cleveland	United States	Jacobs Pavilion
May 5, 2017	Columbus	United States	Express Live!
May 6, 2017	Columbia	United States	Merriweather Post Pavilion
May 8, 2017	Dallas	United States	South Side Ballroom
May 9, 2017	Houston	United States	Revention Music Center
May 10, 2017	Austin	United States	ACL Live at the Moody Theater
May 11, 2017	Austin	United States	ACL Live at the Moody Theater
May 13, 2017 (Note: The 13 May 2017 concert in Atlanta, United States at Centennial Olympic Park is a part of Shaky Knees Music Festival.)	Atlanta	United States	Centennial Olympic Park
May 14, 2017	Raleigh	United States	Red Hat Amphitheater
May 16, 2017	Pittsburgh	United States	Stage AE
May 17, 2017	Philadelphia	United States	Skyline Stage at the Mann
May 19, 2017	New York City	United States	Forest Hills Stadium
May 20, 2017	New York City	United States	Forest Hills Stadium
May 22, 2017	Toronto	Canada	Echo Beach
May 23, 2017	Toronto	Canada	Echo Beach
May 24, 2017	Montreal	Canada	Parc Jean-Drapeau
May 26, 2017	Portland	United States	Thompson's Point
May 27, 2017 (Note: The 27 May 2017 concert in Boston, United States at Boston City Hall Plaza is a part of Boston Calling Music Festival.)	Boston	United States	Boston City Hall Plaza
Part 4 - Europe
2 June 2017 (Note: The 2 June 2017 concert in Barcelona, Spain at Parc del Fòrum is a part of Primavera Sound 2017.)	Barcelona	Spain	Parc del Fòrum
Part 5 - North America
9 June 2017 (Note: The 9 June 2017 concert in Manchester, United States at Great Stage Park is a part of Bonnaroo Music Festival.)	Manchester	United States	Great Stage Park
Part 6 - Europe
20 June 2017	Birmingham	England	O_{2} Academy Birmingham
22 June 2017 (Note: The 22 June 2017 concert in Pilton, England at Worthy Farm is a part of Glastonbury Festival.)	Pilton	England	Worthy Farm
29 June 2017 (Note: The 29 June 2017 concert in Roskilde, Denmark at Festivalpladsen is a part of Roskilde Festival.)	Roskilde	Denmark	Festivalpladsen
1 July 2017 (Note: The 1 July 2017 concert in Gdynia, Poland at Gdynia-Kosakowo Airport is a part of Open'er Festival.)	Gdynia	Poland	Gdynia-Kosakowo Airport
6 July 2017 (Note: The 6 July 2017 concert in Oeiras, Portugal at Passeio Marítimo de Algés is a part of NOS Alive.)	Oeiras	Portugal	Passeio Marítimo de Algés
8 July 2017 (Note: The 8 July 2017 concert in Florence, Italy at Ippodromo delle Cascine is a part of Firenze Summer Festival.)	Florence	Italy	Ippodromo delle Cascine
10 July 2017 (Note: The 10 July 2017 concert in Rome, Italy at Ippodromo delle Capannelle is a part of Rock in Roma.)	Rome	Italy	Ippodromo delle Capannelle
Part 7 - Oceania
21 July 2017 (Note: The 21 July 2017 concert in Byron Bay, Australia at North Byron Parklands is a part of Splendour in the Grass.)	Byron Bay	Australia	North Byron Parklands
Part 8 - Asia
25 July 2017	Singapore	Singapore	Singapore Indoor Stadium
28 July 2017 (Note: The 28 July 2017 concert in Yuzawa, Japan at Naeba Ski Resort is a part of Fuji Rock Festival.)	Yuzawa	Japan	Naeba Ski Resort
30 July 2017 (Note: The 28 July 2017 concert in Seoul, South Korea at Nanji Hangang Park is a part of Holiday Land Festival.)	Seoul	South Korea	Nanji Hangang Park
Part 9 - North America
5 August 2017 (Note: The 5 August 2017 concert in Chicago, United States at Grant Park is a part of Lollapalooza.)	Chicago	United States	Grant Park
Part 10 - Europe
10 August 2017 (Note: The 10 August 2017 concert in Oslo, Norway at Tøyenparken is a part of Øyafestivalen.)	Oslo	Norway	Tøyenparken
11 August 2017 (Note: The 11 August 2017 concert in Gothenburg, Sweden at Slottsskogen is a part of Way Out West.)	Gothenburg	Sweden	Slottsskogen
12 August 2017 (Note: The 12 August 2017 concert in Helsinki, Finland at Suvilahti is a part of Flow Festival.)	Helsinki	Finland	Suvilahti
14 August 2017 (Note: The 14 August 2017 concert in Tallinn, Estonia at Tallinn Song Festival Grounds is a part of Sunset Festival Estonia.)	Tallinn	Estonia	Tallinn Song Festival Grounds
15 August 2017 (Note: The 15 August 2017 concert in Sigulda, Latvia at Sigulda Medieval Castle is a part of Sunset Festival Latvia.)	Sigulda	Latvia	Sigulda Medieval Castle
17 August 2017 (Note: The 17 August 2017 concert in Hasselt, Belgium at Kempische Steenweg is a part of Pukkelpop.)	Hasselt	Belgium	Pukkelpop
18 August 2017 (Note: The tbc concert in Biddinghuizen, Netherlands at Walibi Holland is a part of Lowlands.)	Biddinghuizen	Netherlands	Walibi Holland
25 August 2017 (Note: The 25 August 2017 concert in Rümlag, Switzerland at Festivalgelände is a part of Zurich Openair.)	Rümlang	Switzerland	Festivalgelände
27 August 2017 (Note: The 27 August 2017 concert in Saint-Cloud, France at Château de Saint-Cloud is a part of Rock en Seine.)	Saint-Cloud	France	Château de Saint-Cloud
29 August 2017	Glasgow	Scotland	Glasgow SWG3
30 August 2017	Glasgow	Scotland	Glasgow SWG3
1 September 2017 (Note: The 1 September 2017 concert in Stradbally, Ireland at Stradbally Hall is a part of Electric Picnic.)	Stradbally	Ireland	Stradbally Hall
8 September 2017 (Note: The 8 September 2017 concert in Dorset, England at Lulworth Estate is a part of Bestival.)	Dorset	England	Lulworth Estate
10 September 2017 (Note: The 10 September 2017 concert in Berlin, Germany at Rennbahn Hoppegarten is a part of Lollapalooza Berlin.)	Berlin	Germany	Rennbahn Hoppegarten
Part 11 - North America
23 September 2017	San Diego	United States	The Observatory North Park
24 September 2017 (Note: The 24 September 2017 concert in Las Vegas, United States at Downtown Las Vegas is a part of Life is Beautiful.)	Las Vegas	United States	Downtown Las Vegas
26 September 2017	Sacramento	United States	Golden 1 Center
27 September 2017	Santa Barbara	United States	Santa Barbara Bowl
29 September 2017	Inglewood	United States	The Forum
3 October 2017	Kansas City	United States	Starlight Theatre
4 October 2017	Nashville	United States	Ascend Amphitheater
6 October 2017 (Note: The tbc concert in Austin, United States at Zilker Park is a part of Austin City Limits Music Festival.)	Austin	United States	Zilker Park
9 October 2017 (Note: The show on 9 October 2017 was originally scheduled at the Red Rocks Amphitheatre, but was moved due to snow.)	Broomfield	United States	1stBank Center
10 October 2017	Salt Lake City	United States	The Great Saltair
12 October 2017	Oklahoma City	United States	The Criterion
13 October 2017 (Note: The tbc concert in Austin, United States at Zilker Park is a part of Austin City Limits Music Festival.)	Austin	United States	Zilker Park
15 October 2017 (Note: The tbc concert in Miami, United States at Zilker Park is a part of III Points Festival.)	Miami	United States	Mana Wynwood Convention Center
17 October 2017	Atlanta	United States	Coca-Cola Roxy Theatre
19 October 2017	New Orleans	United States	Champions Square
Part 12 - Latin America
21 October 2017 (Note: The 21 October 2017 concert in Monterrey, Mexico at Parque Fundidora is a part of Live Out Fest.)	Monterrey	Mexico	Parque Fundidora
18 November 2017 (Note: The 18 November 2017 concert in Mexico City, Mexico at Autódromo Hermanos Rodríguez is a part of Festival Corona Capital.)	Mexico City	Mexico	Autódromo Hermanos Rodríguez
Part 13 - Oceania
11 January 2018	Auckland	New Zealand	The Trusts Arena
13 January 2018	Melbourne	Australia	Sidney Myer Music Bowl
14 January 2018	Melbourne	Australia	Forum Theatre
17 January 2018	Brisbane	Australia	Riverstage
20 January 2018	Sydney	Australia	The Domain
Part 14 - Asia
23 January 2018	Jakarta	Indonesia	JIEXPO Kemayoran
25 January 2018	Kuala Lumpur	Malaysia	MITEC
29 January 2018	Bangkok	Thailand	Impact, Muang Thong Thani
1 February 2018	Hong Kong	Hong Kong	AsiaWorld-Expo
3 February 2018	Beijing	China	Beijing Exhibition Center
5 February 2018	Taipei	Taiwan	National Taiwan University Sports Center
7 February 2018	Manila	Philippines	World Trade Center Metro Manila
9 February 2018	Osaka	Japan	Zepp Bayside
11 February 2018	Tokyo	Japan	Makuhari Messe
13 February 2018	Seoul	South Korea	SK Handball Stadium
Part 15 - Europe
May 21, 2018	Belfast	Northern Ireland	Ulster Hall
May 23, 2018	Dublin	Ireland	Tivoli Variety Theatre
May 24, 2018	Dublin	Ireland	Tivoli Variety Theatre
May 26, 2018	London	England	All Points East
June 9, 2018	Manchester	England	Parklife (festival)
July 10, 2018	Bilbao	Spain	Kafe Antzokia
July 13, 2018	Bilbao	Spain	Bilbao BBK Live
July 15, 2018	Ferropolis	Germany	Melt! Festival
July 19, 2018	Lisbon	Portugal	Super Bock Super Rock
Part 16 - North America
July 25, 2018	Washington D.C.	United States	9:30 Club
July 26, 2018	Washington D.C.	United States	9:30 Club
July 27, 2018	Washington D.C.	United States	9:30 Club
July 29, 2018	New York City	United States	Panorama Music Festival

=== Box office score data ===
Venue	City	Tickets sold / available	Gross revenue	Ref.
Forest National	Brussels	16,748 / 16,800 (99%)	$556,526	
Pabellon Cuervo	Mexico City	3,066 / 3,141 (98%)	$164,331	
Bill Graham Civic Auditorium	San Francisco	22,620 / 22,620 (100%)	$1,119,816	
Aragon Ballroom	Chicago	4,701 / 4,873 (96%)	$206,225	
Masonic Temple Theatre	Detroit	3,772 / 4,980 (76%)	$166,982	
Jacobs Pavilion	Cleveland	1,941 / 4,236 (46%)	$65,368	
South Side Ballroom	Dallas	4,000 / 4,079 (98%)	$134,878	
Red Hat Amphitheater	Raleigh	4,261 / 5,801 (73%)	$124,916	
Skyline Stage at the Mann	Philadelphia	5,830 / 6,634 (88%)	$224,185	
Forest Hills Stadium	New York City	21,627 / 25,670 (84%)	$1,290,747	
The Forum	Inglewood	12,305 / 12,305 (100%)	$654,000	
Total		100,871 / 111,139 (91%)	$4,707,974	
