= Crystalised =

2009 song by The xx

Single by The xx

from the album xx
- Released: 27 April 2009
- Genre: Pop
- Length: 3:21
- Label: Young Turks
- Songwriters: Romy Madley Croft; Oliver Sim
- Producer: Jamie xx

The xx singles chronology
"Crystalised" (2009)	"Basic Space" (2009)

"Crystalised" is the debut single by English indie pop band the xx. It was released on 27 April 2009 as the first single from their 2009 self-titled debut album.

== Music and lyrics ==
According to Robert Christgau, "Crystalised" uses a musical structure similar to "VCR", "hooky ostinato riff embellished with a few subtle effects, leading to a soft vocal. The exaggerated drawl of bassist Oliver Sim precedes the more human-scale croon of guitarist Romy Madley Croft." Croft and Sim shared lead vocals, which Rachel Kowal from NPR said are "delivered in a sexy call and response fashion that is reminiscent of the duets" by Canadian indie pop band Stars on their 2004 album Set Yourself on Fire, "minus all the antagonism associated with ex-lovers."

Like most of the other songs on xx, "Crystalised" was based on an imagined romantic scenario, developed from a verse Sim had written thinking about what a fling would be like: "I hadn't really had any relationships to be working off. But I had a huge interest in life, and looking at other people’s relationships around me." He wrote the first lines of the song, including "you applied the pressure / to keep me crystalised", and shared it through iChat with Croft, who responded with her verse, beginning with "I'll forgive and forget / Before I’m paralyzed." John Colapinto of The New Yorker critiqued that "the finished lyrics, some of their best, suggest a twisted love affair, but also hint at drugs and ecological disaster."

== Release and reception ==
"Crystalised" was first released in the UK on 27 April 2009 by Vinyl and on 25 November 2009 by Digital download and then again on 11 October 2010. It has been used in numerous advertisements and TV shows and has over 26 million hits on YouTube as of June 2011. It was sampled in the song "Less Than Zero" by K.Flay and covered by Gorillaz whose version was included in the advertisement for Grey's Anatomy in late 2010. In 2013, it was covered and released as a single by Martina Topley-Bird, Mark Lanegan, and Warpaint.

== Track listing ==
UK iTunes single

1. "Crystalised" – 3:21

UK iTunes EP

1. "Crystalised" (Edu Imbernon Remix) – 7:23
2. "Crystalised" (Dark Sky Remix) – 4:54
3. "Crystalised" (Rory Phillips Remix) – 4:44
4. "Crystalised" (The Neon Lights Remix) – 3:45

== Chart performance ==
Chart (2010–2012)	Peak position
Italy (FIMI)	95
UK Indie (OCC)	14
US Alternative Airplay (Billboard)	37

== Certifications ==
Region	Certification	Certified units/sales
Canada (Music Canada)	Gold	40,000^{‡}
Italy (FIMI)	Gold	25,000^{‡}
New Zealand (RMNZ)	Gold	15,000^{‡}
United Kingdom (BPI)	Gold	400,000^{‡}
United States (RIAA)	Gold	500,000^{‡}
^{‡} Sales+streaming figures based on certification alone.

== Release history ==
Region	Date	Format
United Kingdom	27 April 2009	Vinyl
United Kingdom	25 November 2009	Digital Download
United Kingdom	11 October 2010	Digital Download
