= The xx =

British indie pop band

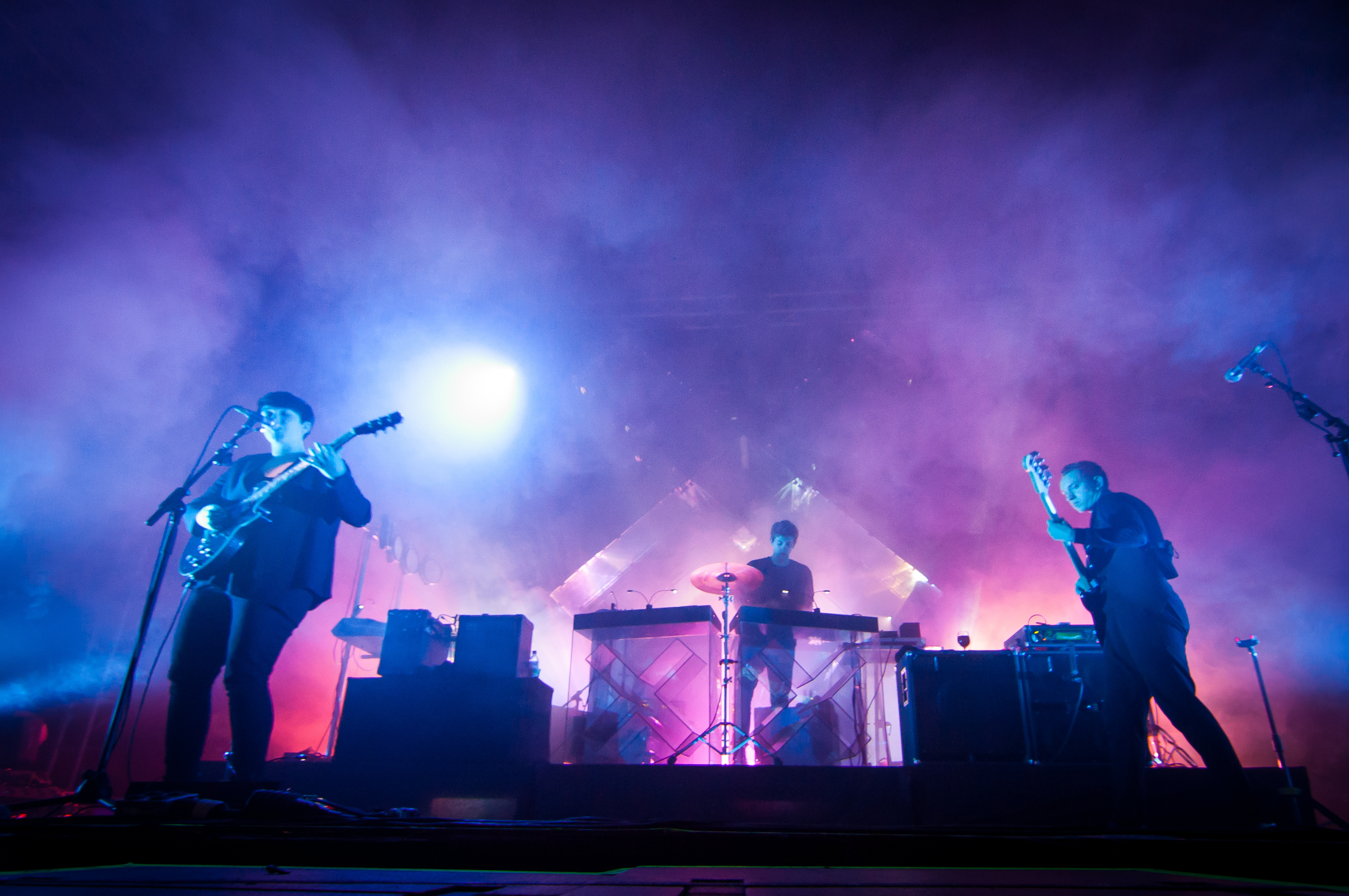
- The xx performing at Ilosaarirock Festival in Joensuu, Finland, in 2012. From left to right: Romy Madley Croft, Jamie xx, and Oliver Sim.

Background information
- Origin: Wandsworth, London, England
- Genres: Indie rock; indie electronic; R&B; indie pop; dream pop; electronic rock
- Years active: 2005–present
- Labels: Young; XL
- Members: Romy Madley Croft; Oliver Sim; Jamie xx
- Past members: Baria Qureshi
- Website: thexx.info

The xx are an English indie pop band from Wandsworth, London, formed in 2005. The band consists of Romy Madley Croft (guitar, vocals), Oliver Sim (bass guitar, vocals), and Jamie Smith, also known as Jamie xx (beats, MPC, record production). They are known for their distinctive minimalist sound blending indie rock, indie electronic, indie pop, dream pop and electro-rock and the dual-vocalist set-up of Madley Croft and Sim. Their music employs soft echoed guitar, prominent bass, light electronic beats and ambient soundscape backgrounds.

The band was formed in 2005 whilst Madley Croft and Sim were students at Elliott School, with Baria Qureshi (keyboard, guitar) and Smith joining in 2006. After posting demos on their Myspace page, the band drew the attention of the Beggars Group-owned label Young Turks (now Young). Working with producer Rodaidh McDonald, the band released their debut album, xx, in August 2009. The album was a commercial and critical success, reaching number three on the UK Albums Chart, ranking first for The Guardian's and second for NME's best of the year lists among others, and winning the Mercury Prize in 2010. After their debut, Qureshi left the group.

Their second album, Coexist, was released on 5 September 2012 to positive reviews, reaching number one in the UK and number five on the Billboard 200. After a four-year lapse between releases, including Smith's solo debut in 2015, In Colour, the band released their third album, I See You, on 13 January 2017, which debuted to critical acclaim and reached number one in the UK and number two on the Billboard 200.

== History ==
=== 2005–2009: Formation ===
The band formed while studying at Elliott School, the same school attended by Hot Chip, Burial, Four Tet, actor Pierce Brosnan, and Fleetwood Mac founder Peter Green. Though Madley Croft and Sim had been friends since the age of 3, meeting at nursery school. Madley Croft downplayed media reports of the school's influence on their careers: "A teacher from Elliott who had never even taught us said how great we were. It's a bit annoying. We were left alone, more than anything — although I'm sure that helped us in its own way." Oliver Sim and Romy Madley Croft (born 1989) started the band as a duo when they were 15. In 2006, guitarist Baria Qureshi joined once they had begun performing, with Jamie Smith, also known as Jamie xx, also joining that year. They all studied GCSE Music together. The band were taken on by Caius Pawson, who founded the label. Young provided the band with a studio in Ladbroke Grove to develop their music. Whilst there has been much speculation over the meaning of the band's name, the band have said they just liked the way "the xx" looked written down.

=== 2009–2011: xx and Qureshi's departure ===
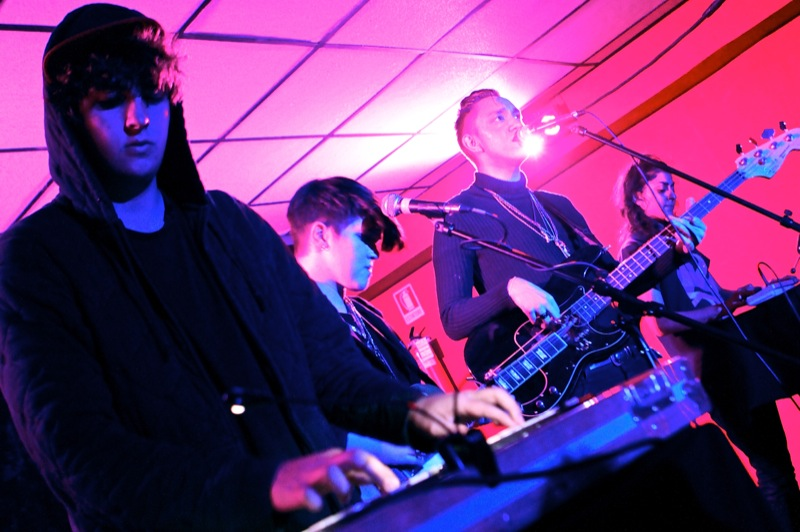
The original line-up performing in October 2009

The xx's debut album xx was released on 14 August 2009 through the British independent record label Young Turks, and was met with critical acclaim. The album ranked on best of the year lists, ranking ninth on the Rolling Stone list and second for NME. In the 2009 NME The Future 50 list, the xx was positioned at number six, and in October 2009, it was named one of MTV Iggy's "Top 10 Bands with Buzz" (at the CMJ Music Marathon 2009). "Crystalised" was featured on iTunes (UK) as Single of the Week, starting from 18 August 2009.

Though the band had previously worked with producers including Diplo and Kwes, Smith produced xx and co-mixed with Rodaidh McDonald. The xx recorded its first album in a small garage that was part of the XL Recordings studio, often at night.

In August 2009, the band headlined their own concert tour. The xx toured with artists including Friendly Fires, The Big Pink, and Micachu. In January 2010, Matt Groening chose the band to play at the All Tomorrow's Parties festival which he curated in Minehead, England. In addition, the band played at five music festivals in the US: Coachella, Sasquatch, Bonnaroo, Lollapalooza and Austin City Limits.

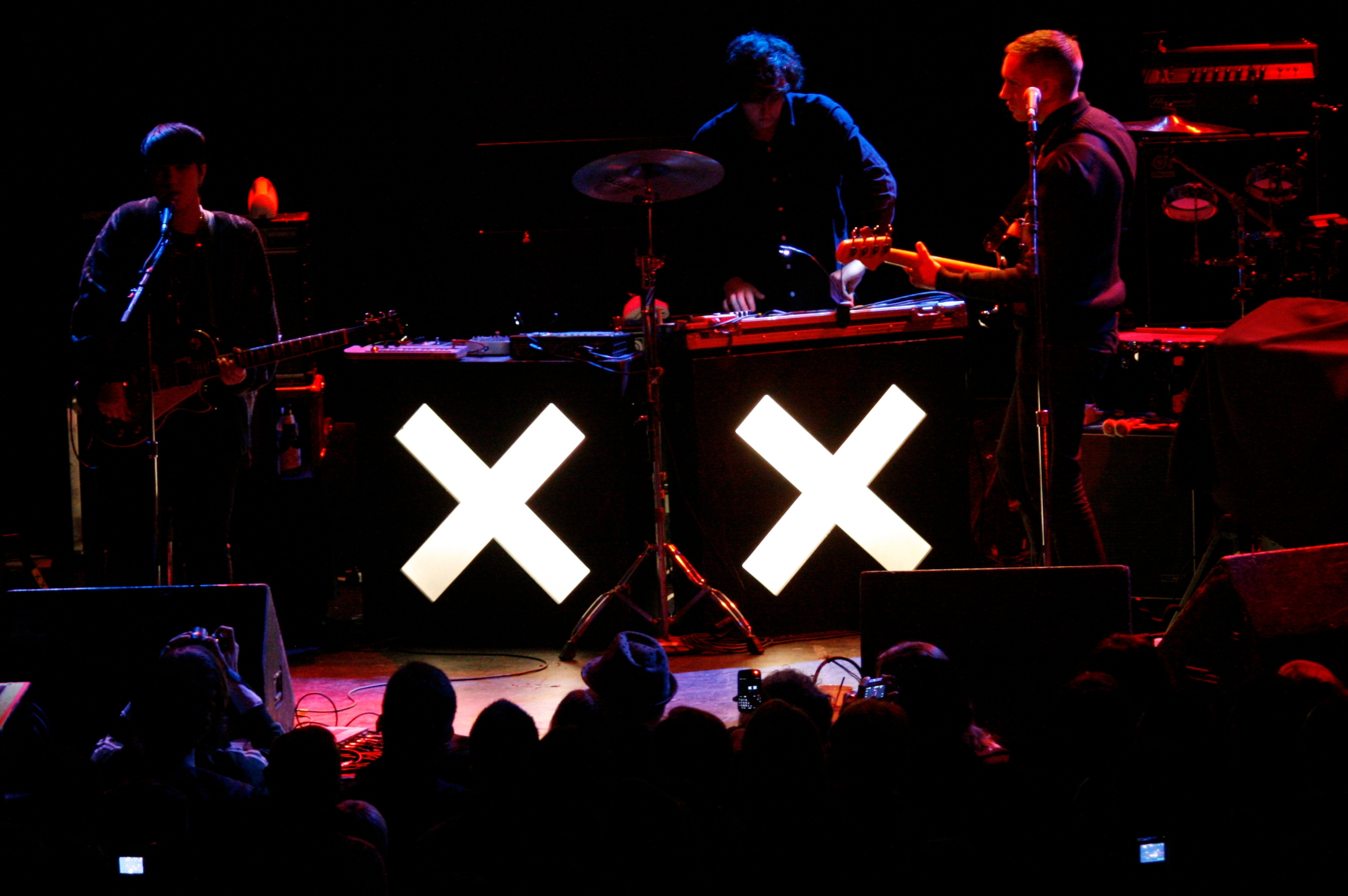
After Qureshi's departure, the xx toured as a trio (pictured in December 2009).

In late 2009, second guitarist and keyboardist Baria Qureshi exited the group. Initial reports stated that this was due to exhaustion, but Oliver Sim later said that the rest of the band had made this decision: "Also to be fair to her, people have an idea about that she left the band. She didn't. It was a decision that me, Romy, and Jamie made. And it had to happen."

The music of their debut album was used extensively on television and in other media, such as 24/7, Person of Interest, NBC's coverage of the 2010 Winter Olympic Games; during the series Cold Case, Suits, Mercy, the Greek version of Next Top Model, Bedlam, Hung, 90210, as well as being the feature song for the March 2010 E4 advert for 90210, Misfits, the Karl Lagerfeld fall/winter 2011 fashion show, Waterloo Road, and the film I Am Number Four. In May 2010, the track "Intro" was used by the BBC in its coverage of the 2010 general election. This led to the band playing the track on an episode of Newsnight. The track was also played before the UEFA Euro 2012 and UEFA Euro 2016 matches at stadiums in Poland, Ukraine, and France and featured during the end of Top Gear season 19 episode 6 "Africa Special Part 1". Dimitri Vegas & Like Mike and Sander van Doorn's 2012 single "Project T", which launched the Tomorrowland 2012 aftermovie, contains samples from "Intro"; van Doorn had earlier released a remix of the song in 2010. The song was also sampled in Rihanna's "Drunk on Love" from her album Talk That Talk and was featured in the films It's Kind of a Funny Story and Project X.

In September 2010, xx won the Mercury Prize. After the live ceremony screening, the album jumped from number 16 to 3 on 12 September edition of the UK Albums Chart, accompanying a 269% sales increase. XL's marketing campaign drastically expanded after this substantial win, with day-time television advertisements and billboard campaigns on some of the UK's highest-profile digital billboards. Thanks to the highlighted publicity, XL Recordings says that it shipped more than 40,000 CDs in the days following the Mercury Prize. XL managing director Ben Beardsworth explained, "Thanks to the Mercury win... things are accelerating dramatically and the band will be reaching a bigger and bigger audience with their music." In another promotional initiative, the label sent out Saam Farahmand's audio/visual sculpture of the album when the band toured at Bestival 2010, as well as to an event at Seoul.

The xx was nominated for 'Best British Album', 'Best British Breakthrough' and 'Best British Band' at the 2011 BRIT Awards held on 15 February 2011 at the O2 Arena in London, although it did not win in any of the categories.

=== 2011–2012: Coexist ===
In December 2011, Smith revealed that he wanted to release the xx's second album ahead of its festival appearances the following year, and that it was inspired by "club music", having all spent more time "partying" since not being on tour, and hoping the album would be released in time to play the summer festivals. The band have spoken about the importance of taking a break from touring before writing another album.

On 1 June 2012, it was announced that the follow-up, Coexist, would be released on 10 September. On 16 July 2012, it announced and released "Angels" as the lead single from Coexist. On 3 September 2012, in a collaboration with Microsoft's Internet Explorer, the xx released Coexist to stream on its website until the worldwide release date on 11 September.

In August 2012, the xx was featured on the cover of issue number 81 of The Fader. The album was voted number 8 on The Guardian's Albums of 2012.

The xx performed at Bestival on 9 September 2012 in front of the festival's largest crowd. The band's first North American tour began 5 October in Vancouver, Canada, with dates throughout the US and Mexico.

=== 2013–2018: Touring and I See You ===
In 2013, the xx held a series of three festival-style concerts, called "Night + Day", in Berlin, Lisbon, and London. The festivals featured performances and DJ sets curated by the band, including Kindness and Mount Kimbie. Each festival culminated in a nighttime concert by the band. The band was nominated for a Brit Award for Best British Group, eventually losing out to Mumford & Sons.

In April 2013, the xx contributed the song "Together" to the official soundtrack to Baz Luhrmann's adaptation of The Great Gatsby. In March 2014, the xx performed a series of shows at the Park Avenue Armory in New York City. The show featured live visual effects and had a limited capacity.

In May 2014, the band revealed that they were working on their third studio album, working with producer Rodaidh McDonald at the Marfa Recording Company studio in Texas. They also worked on their music at Greenhouse Studios, in Reykjavik, in the summer of 2014 whilst holding the Night + Day Iceland Festival.

In May 2015, Jamie xx said that his debut album In Colour "has definitely informed what we're doing for the next album." The band also reported that the record will have "a completely different concept" than their previous records. In November 2015, the band stated that they would continue working on the record through December and it will be released in 2016. On 6 October 2016, it was reported the band was planning to release new music "before the holidays." On 10 October 2016, they announced that they were still working on the third album, but shared a playlist and added tour dates.

In November 2016, the xx announced that the release of their third studio album, I See You, would be on 13 January 2017. They released the album's lead single "On Hold" at the same time. On 19 November 2016, the xx appeared as the musical guest on Saturday Night Live. They performed the songs "On Hold" and "I Dare You". On 2 January 2017, the band released the album's second lead single "Say Something Loving".

The album's title, I See You, came from the lyrics of the Velvet Underground song "I'll Be Your Mirror". After a testing period of being on tour with Coexist, and a much-needed break, Romy stated that this name fitted, as it describes "the way a friend can be a mirror to you, reflect things you can't see yourself, good and bad". The album tracks used samples including those from Hall & Oates on "On Hold", the Alessi Brothers on "Say Something Loving" (which was also a collaboration with Stella Mozgawa from Warpaint), and Drake in "Naive".

In November 2016, UK and European tour dates were announced for the new album. On 25 November 2016 the band announced an extended residency at the O2 Academy, Brixton, adding four additional days to their original tour and setting the record for longest run of sold-out shows in the venue's history.

I See You was nominated for IMPALA's European Album of the Year Award.

=== 2019–present: Side projects and fourth studio album ===
In 2020, Madley Croft recorded backing vocals on the song "We Will Sin Together" on Jehnny Beth's debut solo album, To Love Is to Live, and released her debut single, "Lifetime".

Sim released his debut album, Hideous Bastard, on 9 September 2022 through Young. It was produced by Jamie xx.

Madley Croft's debut solo album Mid Air, produced by Stuart Price, Fred Again, and Jamie xx, was released on 8 September 2023 through Young.

In 2024, Sim and Madley Croft featured on Jamie xx's track "Waited All Night".

The different band members have appeared on stage together as part of their solo projects. Madley Croft and Sim have joined Jamie xx's 2024 set at Glastonbury and 2025 set at LIDO Festival. Sim has joined Romy's set at the Roundhouse in 2024.

In early January 2024, Croft confirmed the band was working on their fourth studio album. In September 2025, it was announced that they would be playing at Coachella 2026. On April 3rd 2026, the band played live for the first time in 8 years in Mexico City, being the first of 3 sold out dates.

== Musical style and influences ==
The xx has been described as various genres, including indie rock, indie pop, indie electronic, R&B, dream pop, and electro-rock, while incorporating elements of post-punk and dance. The band members have cited several artists in their influences. Madley Croft said: "Jamie started out very much into soul and then from there moved into hip-hop and UK-based dance music. He brings some much lower frequencies of bass into the band. And then I've grown up listening to Siouxsie and the Banshees, and the Cure. We're really quite a huge melting pot of different stuff." Sim is a fan of Aaliyah, with the band covering her song "Hot Like Fire".

The xx have also been inspired by CocoRosie, the Kills, Electrelane and OMD. When signing to their label, they discovered bands like Cocteau Twins. The group have expressed an admiration for Beyoncé. Additionally, Madley Croft has noted a personal affection for Jimi Hendrix, the Slits, Joy Division, Yazoo, Eurythmics, New Order and Mariah Carey.

== Band members ==
Current members

- Romy Madley Croft – vocals, guitars, keyboards (2005–present)
- Oliver Sim – vocals, bass, synthesizers (2005–present)
- Jamie xx – synthesizers, drums, keyboards, samplers, sequencers, production (2006–present)

Former members

- Baria Qureshi – keyboards, guitar (2005–2009)

== Awards and nominations ==
Year	Awards	Work	Category	Result	Ref.
2009	Žebřík Music Awards	Themselves	Best International Discovery	Nominated	
2009	Rober Awards Music Poll	Themselves	Breakthrough Artist	Won	
2009	Rober Awards Music Poll	Themselves	Best Pop Artist	Nominated	
2009	Rober Awards Music Poll	xx	Album of the Year	Nominated	
2009	Best Art Vinyl	xx	Best Vinyl Art	Nominated	
2009	UK Music Video Awards	"Basic Space"	Best Visual Effects	Nominated	
2010	UK Music Video Awards	"Islands"	Best Indie/Alternative Video	Nominated	
2010	Mercury Prize	xx	Album of the Year	Won	
2010	UK Festival Awards	Themselves	Best Breakthrough Act	Nominated	
2010	NME Awards	Themselves	Best New Band	Nominated	
2010	Q Awards	Themselves	Best New Act	Nominated	
2010	Q Awards	"VCR"	Best Track	Nominated	
2011	European Festival Awards	Themselves	Best Newcomer	Nominated	
2011	Ivor Novello Awards	"Islands"	Best Contemporary Song	Nominated	
2011	BT Digital Music Awards	The xx iPhone app	Best Music App	Nominated	
2011	International Dance Music Awards	"VCR" (Four Tet Remix)	Best Alternative/Rock Dance Track	Nominated	
2011	Brit Awards	xx	British Album of the Year	Nominated	
2011	Brit Awards	Themselves	British Group	Nominated	
2012	Brit Awards	Themselves	British Group	Nominated	
2013	Independent Music Awards	Coexist	Best 'Difficult' Second Album	Nominated	
2013	A2IM Libera Awards	Coexist	Independent Album of the Year	Nominated	
2013	Brit Awards	Themselves	Best British Group	Nominated	
2013	mtvU Woodie Awards	Themselves	Branching Out Woodie	Nominated	
2014	mtvU Woodie Awards	Themselves	Performing Woodie	Nominated	
2017	A2IM Libera Awards	I See You	Marketing Genius	Won	
2017	AIM Independent Music Awards	"On Hold"	Independent Track of the Year	Won	
2017	Q Awards	Best Album	I See You	Nominated	
2017	Hungarian Music Awards	"On Hold"	Foreign Electronic Music Album or Sound Record	Won	
2018	Hungarian Music Awards	I See You	Foreign Electronic Music Album or Sound Record	Won	
2018	Sweden GAFFA Awards	I See You	Best Foreign Album	Nominated	
2018	Sweden GAFFA Awards	Themselves	Best International Group	Won	
2018	Brit Awards	Themselves	Best British Group	Nominated	

== Discography ==
- xx (2009)
- Coexist (2012)
- I See You (2017)

== Tours ==
- The xx Tour (2009–10)
- Coexist Tour (2012–2014)
- I See You Tour (2017–2018)
