= Intro (The xx song) =

Promotional single by The xx

from the album xx
- Released: 14 August 2009
- Recorded: 2008–2009
- Studio: XL Studio (London, England)
- Genre: Indie pop; trip hop
- Length: 2:08
- Label: Young Turks
- Songwriters: Romy Madley Croft; Oliver Sim; Jamie Smith; Baria Qureshi
- Producer: Jamie xx

"Intro" is the opening song of English indie pop group The xx's debut studio album, xx (2009). It was composed as an instrumental by the group and produced by one of its members, Jamie xx. The song has been positively received, as well as earning comparisons to the works of Casiokids and Interpol. It has been analysed by The Daily Telegraph to have been a "TV favourite", getting play in several television adverts, events, and shows. The track has reached number 129 on the UK Singles Chart, as well as charting in France, Spain and the United States.

== Production ==
"Intro"'s production was handled by Jamie xx, who was also mixer. The recording and mixing was held between December 2008 and May 2009 at XL Studio, a studio by XL Recordings located in London, England. Rodaidh McDonald engineered the track and was also the mixer. Romy Madley Croft and Baria Qureshi played guitar, the latter being a keyboardist for the song, while Oliver Sim was bassist. Finally, the mastering was done by Nilesh Patel at studio The Exchange in Camden Town.

== Composition ==
"Intro" was composed by Baria Qureshi, Jamie xx, Oliver Sim and Romy Madley Croft. It is an instrumental with a duration of approximately two minutes and eight seconds, performed in the key of A minor—with a chord progression of F–Am followed throughout the song—and in common time at a tempo of 100 beats per minute. The instrumentation consists of a "fuzzy keyboard, a simple guitar riff, wordless chanting" and "double-tracked drums", according to The A.V. Club's Vadim Rizov; Chase McMullen from Beats Per Minute described the song as "nearly trip hop". It opens with a riff that BBC Music's Lou Thomas compared to "Fot I Hose" by Casiokids, before the beat drops in which he said was "heavy enough for dubstep". PopMatters journalist Ben Schumer said "Intro" "could almost pass for the score to a scene in a James Bond film. Although, it would have be [sic] some sort of nautical nighttime mission for Mr. Bond." He also compared it to "Untitled" from Interpol's debut album Turn on the Bright Lights, explaining that it "sets the scene [of xx] and gives listeners their first intoxicating taste of the xx's soundworld." AllMusic critic Heather Phares described the sound as "moody" and "monochromatic".

== Reception ==
"Intro" was well received by critics. Bustle journalist Gabrielle Moss called it a "British indie pop gem", and Chase McMullen of Beats per Minute honored the song as "a perfect opening to the greatness that is [xx]". The Observer critic Sarah Boden wrote that "As the languorous swirl of Intro fades in [...] you immediately sense you're listening to something seductively special." Vadim Rizov of The A.V. Club called the arrangement "epic minimalism", while AllMusic's Heather Phares opined it "lovely enough". Commercially, "Intro"'s first appearance on the charts was in 2010, when it hit number 161 on the UK Singles Chart. Between 2012 and 2013, the track reached number 96 in France and number 50 in Spain, as well as earning a new peak on the UK chart at number 129.

== In other media ==
In 2010, Neil McCormick, a writer for The Daily Telegraph, analysed "Intro" to have "become a TV favourite", and has helped the xx develop enough media presence to garner "over half a million sales around the world without ever having anything as vulgar as a hit". BBC used it as the theme for the 2010 United Kingdom general election. It also was used in a commercial starring American speed skater Apolo Ohno for the telecom company AT&T.

Furthermore, the song was featured in the 2010 film It's Kind of a Funny Story and the 2012 film Project X, as well as in an episode of the first season of Person of Interest in October 2011, in episode 3 of the first season of The Magicians, and in episode 7 of the second season of Outer Banks following which the song entered Billboard's Top TV Songs chart at number 4 in August 2021.

Rihanna's song "Drunk on Love", from her sixth studio album Talk That Talk, samples the melody of "Intro", and subsequently, all members of The xx earned writing credits on Talk That Talk.

== Credits and personnel ==
Credits adapted from the liner notes of xx.

- Romy Madley Croft – guitar, wordless vocals
- Oliver Sim – bass, wordless vocals
- Jamie Smith – beats, mixing, MPC, production
- Baria Qureshi – guitar, keyboards
- Rodaidh McDonald – engineering, mixing
- Nilesh Patel – mastering

== Charts ==
Chart performance for "Intro"
Chart (2010–2026)	Peak position
Australia Digital Tracks (ARIA)	45
France (SNEP)	96
Hungary (Single Top 40)	34
Ireland (IRMA)	62
Italy (FIMI)	59
Russia Streaming (TopHit)	100
Spain (Promusicae)	50
UK Singles (Official Charts Company)	129
UK Indie (Official Charts)	11
US Rock Digital Songs (Billboard)	32

== Certifications ==
Certifications for "Intro"
Region	Certification	Certified units/sales
Canada (Music Canada)	2× Platinum	160,000^{‡}
Denmark (IFPI Danmark)	Platinum	90,000^{‡}
Italy (FIMI)	Platinum	50,000^{‡}
New Zealand (RMNZ)	Platinum	30,000^{‡}
Spain (Promusicae)	Gold	30,000^{‡}
United Kingdom (BPI)	Platinum	600,000^{‡}
United States (RIAA)	3× Platinum	3,000,000^{‡}
Streaming
Denmark (IFPI Danmark)	Gold	900,000^{†}
^{‡} Sales+streaming figures based on certification alone.^{†} Streaming-only figures based on certification alone.
