= Islands (The xx song) =

2009 single by the xx

Single by the xx

from the album xx
- Released: 26 October 2009
- Recorded: 2009
- Genre: Indie pop
- Length: 2:44
- Label: Young Turks
- Songwriters: Baria Qureshi; Oliver Sim; Jamie Smith; Romy Madley Croft
- Producer: The xx

The xx singles chronology
"Basic Space" (2009)	"Islands" (2009)	"VCR" (2010)

"Islands" is a song recorded by English indie pop band the xx for their self-titled debut studio album. Written by band-members Jamie Smith, Oliver Sim, Romy Madley Croft and then-member Baria Qureshi, "Islands" is a dark and simple indie pop track. It also contains influences from house music and features instrumentation from guitars and synthesizers. Croft and Sim, who provided vocals in the track, sing about themes related to loyalty and love. "Islands" was released on 26 October 2009 as the third single from the album by Young Turks in 7-inch single and digital download formats. In March 2010, the song was re-released as a 12-inch single.

Critically well received, "Islands" was praised for its melody and the vocal performances of Croft and Sim. It was later ranked at number 28 on NME magazine's list of the "150 Best Tracks of the Past 15 Years". The song became the band's highest-peaking single in the United Kingdom after it reached number 34 on the UK Singles Chart. It also peaked at number three on the UK Indie Chart. An accompanying music video for "Islands" was directed by Saam Farahmand, and consists of numerous tracking shots that show six dancers performing a dance routine around the members of the band. Every different shot features a slight change in the expression, gestures, and movement of the dancers and band-members. Critics complimented the concept of the video, and felt it was representative of the xx's musical style. The band performed the song live at the iTunes Festival in 2010 and it was also included on the set list of their 2010 and 2013 tour.

A cover version of "Islands" was recorded by Colombian singer-songwriter Shakira for inclusion in her ninth studio album Sale el Sol (2010). The cover followed a very similar instrumentation to the original version, but featured a faster tempo and more house elements. Shakira performed the cover live at the 2010 Glastonbury Festival in Pilton, Somerset.

== Background and composition ==
"Islands" (2009)
14 second sample of the chorus of "Islands", which features a simple beat and "girl-boy" vocals.

"Islands" was written by the xx band-members Jamie Smith, Oliver Sim, Romy Madley Croft and then-member Baria Qureshi, for the English indie pop band's self-titled debut album (2009). According to the sheet music published at Musicnotes.com by Universal Music Publishing Group, the song is composed in the key of C♯ minor and has a metronome of 124 beats per minute. Sim and Croft provide vocals in the track, and their range spans from G#3 to E4. Similar to the band's usual style of production, "Islands" is dark and "nocturnal" in nature and follows a "simple, effective" beat. It features instrumentation from guitars which "twirl like dance floor partners in the background" and synthesisers that "play like a musical shadow". According to BBC Music's Lou Thomas, the song features house rhythms and a melody similar to that of Tom Petty's 1989 song "I Won't Back Down". Lyrically, "Islands" is a "psycho-geographical love song" and contains themes of loyalty, which are heard in lines like "I am yours now, so I don’t ever have to leave". The duo's vocals were described as "girl-boy", with Croft's vocal delivery taking on a "pleasant soft-pop vibe". Sim momentarily interrupts the verses with "four short thumbings". A "typically heartfelt and bed-cuddly" refrain "I am yours now" is repeated throughout the song, and UK-based online publication Muso's Guide regarded it as "the closest thing The xx has produced to a hook".

The song was released as the third single from xx on 26 October 2009 by Young Turks in 7-inch single and digital download formats. A minimalistic and "sexy" track named "Do You Mind?" was included as the B-side to "Islands", and is composed of "untypically brash drums". On 15 March 2010, Young Turks released a 12-inch single version "Islands", which contained various remixes of the song.

== Critical reception ==
"Islands" was critically well received. It was called a "top-notch indie pop song" by BBC Music. Lou Thomas, a critic for the website, said there is a "sense of quiet triumph" in what he felt was a musical reference to "I Won't Back Down" by Tom Petty in the song's melody, "despite the incongruity". The Muso's Guide review of "Islands" approved of the song's release as a single and complimented Croft and Sim's vocal delivery, saying they "provide a superb introduction to what the band is all about". They particularly appreciated its "I am yours now" refrain, naming it "a typically heartfelt and bed-cuddly line that makes The xx the perfect alternative lovers band". Emily Mackay from NME called the song "gorgeous" and felt it was "the perfect soundtrack for wandering aimlessly along rainy London streets". Andrew Gaerig from Pitchfork Media chose "Islands" as one of the highlights from the album and complimented Croft's vocals and Sim's involvement. In 2011, NME ranked "Islands" at number 28 on their list of "150 Best Tracks of the Past 15 Years", naming it the band's "finest moment thus far".

== Chart performance ==
In the United Kingdom, "Islands" reached number 34 on the singles chart and is the xx's highest-peaking single in the region to date. Its total stay inside the top 40 of the chart lasted for eight weeks. "Islands" was more successful on the UK Indie chart and peaked at number three. The song also peaked at number 16 on Ultratop chart of the Dutch-speaking Flanders region of Belgium, and stayed on the chart for a total of two weeks.

== Music video ==
=== Development and synopsis ===
The accompanying music video for "Islands" was directed by Saam Farahmand, who had previously worked with artists like Simian Mobile Disco and Klaxons. It premiered on MTV on 21 April 2010. Composed of a series of tracking shots, the video shows Croft, Sim, and Smith "listlessly" sitting on a couch with six dancers performing a choreographed dance routine behind them. The dancers carry out the same routine with every next tracking shot, but a slight change in their expressions, gestures, and movement takes place. Similarly, the band-members repeatedly change their positions and facial expressions "with differing fervour". Near to the end of the video, the pattern begins modifying and "the comfortable habits get broken up/break up" as the dancers and band-members leave one by one. The backdrop, which consists of several small "X" letters, also catches fire.

=== Reception ===
The video received positive reviews from critics. Katie Hasty from HitFix praised the choreography, calling it "eye-popping", and labelled the video as "classy, contained, and borderline claustrophobic". She complimented Farahmand for directing a risky concept and commented that the tracking shots were like "an inhale and exhale with each new take". Furthermore, she felt that the video was representative of the xx's sound, calling it "morose and hypnotic, just like the band, the aural equivalent of a mumblecore movie", and opined that the end of the video showed how "love goes". Chris Ryan from MTV also found the video similar to the band's musical style, and commented that the slight changes in its pattern "suggest unrest under the surface -- much like the band's pristine, subtly menacing sound". He also noted that while "it's often hard to imagine what visuals would go well" with the xx's songs, the music video for "Islands" "trumps anything we could have ever imagined".

== Live performances and usage in media ==
On 2 October 2009, the xx performed "Islands" live on British music television show Later... with Jools Holland, along with "Night Time". The song was included on the set list of their 2010 tour, and was also performed at the ITunes Festival held at The Roundhouse in London in the same year; the band later released a digital EP of their performance. "Islands" was also included on the set list of the band's 2013 tour, and a more rock-oriented version of the song was performed.

"Islands" was played during the closing monologue of the fourteenth episode of the sixth season of American television medical drama Grey's Anatomy, entitled "Valentine's Day Massacre". It was also a part of the soundtrack of the tenth episode of the second season of comedy-drama television series Parenthood, entitled "Happy Thanksgiving".

== Formats and track listing ==
- 7-inch single
1. "Islands" – 2:44
2. "Do You Mind?" – 3:37
- Digital download
1. "Islands" – 2:44
2. "Do You Mind?" – 3:37
- 12-inch single
1. "Islands" (Untold remix) – 4:52
2. "Islands" (The Blue Nile remix) – 2:28
3. "Islands" (Nosaj Thing remix) – 2:25
4. "Islands" (Delorean remix) – 4:40
- Digital EP
1. "Do You Mind?" – 3:37
2. "Islands" (Untold remix) – 5:17
3. "Islands" (The Blue Nile remix) – 2:42
4. "Islands" (Nosaj Thing remix) – 2:36
5. "Islands" (Delorean remix) – 5:05
6. "Islands" (Falty DL remix) – 3:40

== Charts ==
Chart (2009)	Peak position
Belgium (Ultratop 50 Flanders)	16
France (SNEP)	90
UK Singles (OCC)	34
UK Indie (OCC)	3

== Certifications ==
Region	Certification	Certified units/sales
Canada (Music Canada)	Gold	40,000^{‡}
New Zealand (RMNZ)	Gold	15,000^{‡}
United Kingdom (BPI)	Gold	400,000^{‡}
United States (RIAA)	Gold	500,000^{‡}
^{‡} Sales+streaming figures based on certification alone.

== Shakira cover ==
"Islands"

Song by Shakira

from the album Sale el Sol
- Studio: Platinum Sound Studios (New York, NY)
- Genre: Indie pop; house
- Length: 2:43
- Label: Epic
- Songwriters: Baria Qureshi; Oliver Sim; Jamie Smith; Romy Madley Croft
- Producers: Shakira; Lukas Burton

Colombian singer-songwriter Shakira recorded a cover version of "Islands" for inclusion in her ninth studio album Sale el Sol, which was released on October 19, 2010. Although there was initial speculation that the cover would be entitled "Explore", it appeared on the final track list of the album using its original name. In comparison to the original version, Shakira's cover of "Islands" follows a largely similar and "fairly faithful" instrumentation, but features a faster tempo, "hopeful-sounding" vocals, and "pseudo-house" elements. Prior to Shakira recording the cover of "Islands", Croft had briefly met her at the London BBC Studios; the former talked about her meeting, saying "We were sitting on a wall outside the BBC and she came up and her bodyguards parted and it was little Shakira, and she says, "Hi!" And I was like, Wow! I found out recently that she's a big fan of The Cure and stuff".

Shakira's cover of "Islands" drew generally favourable reception from critics. Stephen Thomas Erlewine from AllMusic felt it was a highlight on the album, and commented that Shakira "finds warmth within the art pop of The xx, whose "Islands" is a shimmering peak here". Mikael Wood from Entertainment Weekly appreciated the cover, and opined that "[Shakira] discovers the beating heart inside that band's subdued electro-goth jam". Becky Bain from Idolator called Shakira's version of "Islands" "sunnier than the original" and regarded it as "brilliantly subdued", complimenting the singer's overall reworking of the original track. In 2011, Stereogum included the cover on their list of "The 10 Best xx Covers". Shakira's cover of "Islands" appeared on the US Billboard Latin Digital Songs chart, peaking at number 39 for one week.

In June 2010, Shakira performed the cover live at the Glastonbury Festival in Pilton, Somerset. Alex Needham from The Guardian called the performance "a slinky cover" that "is a nod to the indie kids". Maria Schurr from PopMatters felt the performance was "less intimate than the original", but "managed to amplify the tremendous pop sensibilities embedded beneath Romy Madley Croft"s and Oliver Sim's hushed coos". She concluded by saying that "as great as The xx are, it’s probably safe to say that Shakira can cut a rug better".

=== Weekly charts ===
Weekly chart performance for "Islands"
Chart (2010)	Peak position
US Latin Digital Songs (Billboard)	39
