= Xx (The xx album) =

2009 studio album by the xx

xx

Studio album by the xx
- Released: 14 August 2009
- Recorded: December 2008 – April 2009
- Studio: XL (West London)
- Genres: Indie pop; dream pop; indie rock
- Length: 38:34
- Label: Young Turks
- Producer: Jamie Smith

The xx chronology
xx (2009)	Coexist (2012)

Singles from xx
- 1. "Crystalised" Released: 27 April 2009; 2. "Basic Space" Released: 3 August 2009; 3. "Islands" Released: 26 October 2009; 4. "VCR" Released: 25 January 2010

xx is the debut studio album by the English indie pop band the xx. It was released on 14 August 2009 by Young Turks, then an imprint label of XL Recordings, and recorded from December 2008 to February 2009 at the label's in-house studio in London. Producing the album, Jamie Smith of the xx created electronic beats for the songs on his laptop and mixed them in a detailed process with the audio engineer Rodaidh McDonald, who attempted to reproduce the intimate, unembellished quality of the band's original demos.

Along with the xx's early R&B influences, the album has drawn comparisons from journalists to alternative rock, electronica and post-punk sounds. Its largely melancholic songs feature minimalist arrangements built around Smith's beats and instrumental parts recorded by the other members of the band, including Oliver Sim's basslines and sparse guitar figures by Baria Qureshi and Romy Madley Croft, who employs reverb in her lead guitar playing. Most of the songs are sung as low-key duets by Croft and Sim, both of whom had written emotional lyrics about love, intimacy, loss and desire.

Released to widespread acclaim, xx was named one of 2009's best records and received praise for the band's atmospheric style of indie rock and pop as well as the interpersonal dimension of the performances. Commercially, it performed steadily over its first few years of release, becoming a sleeper hit in the United Kingdom and the United States, and eventually sold one million copies. Although major media outlets had largely ignored the band at first, and none of its singles became hits, xx received greater exposure from the licensing of its songs to television programmes and the band's Mercury Prize win for the album in 2010.

This album is the only one which released as the four-piece band. Shortly after the album's release, and with differences between Qureshi and the rest of the group leading to her dismissal, the xx continued to play as a trio on a protracted concert tour that helped increase their fanbase, reputation in the press and confidence as performers. xx proved highly influential in subsequent years, as its distinctive stylistic elements were incorporated by many indie bands and top-selling pop acts. One of the most acclaimed records of its era, it has been regarded as one of the greatest albums of the 21st century by NME, Rolling Stone and The Guardian.

== Background ==
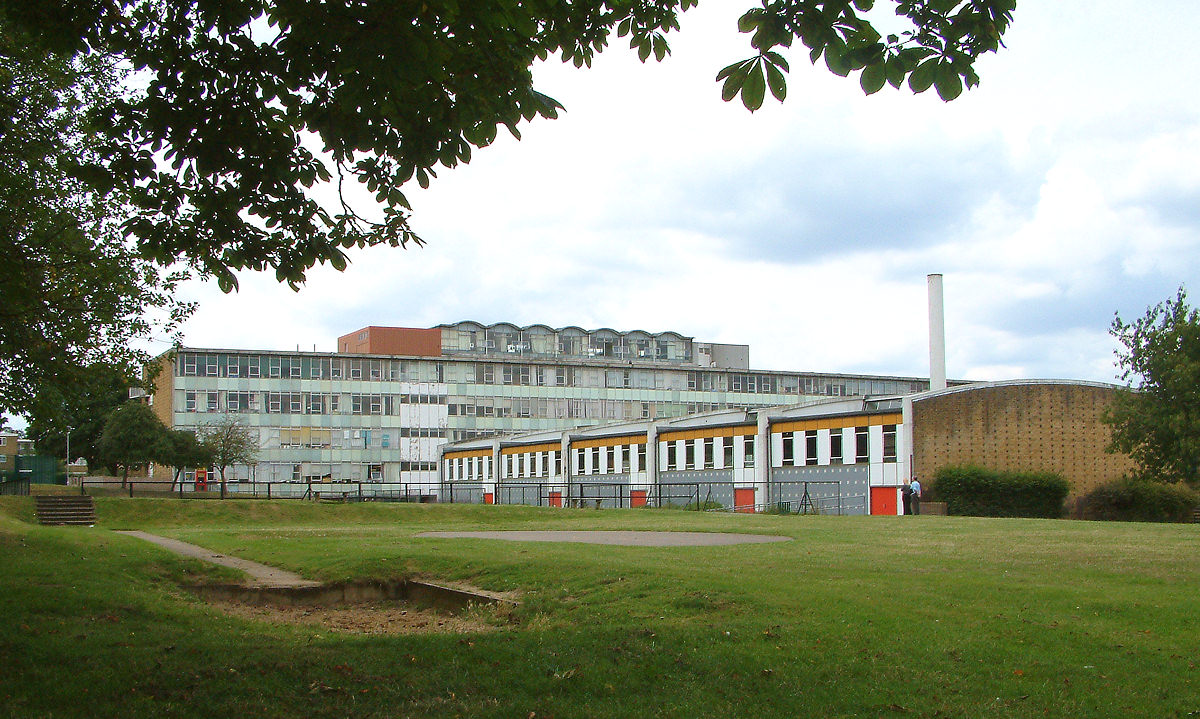
The Elliott School in London, where the xx studied and formed

While students at South London's Elliott School in 2005, childhood friends Romy Madley Croft and Oliver Sim formed the xx with Jamie Smith and Baria Qureshi. Croft and Sim played guitar and bass, respectively, and dueted as the band's vocalists, while Smith programmed electronic beats for their songs and Qureshi doubled as a keyboardist and additional guitarist. During late nights, Croft and Sim either shared lyrics with each other through instant messaging or rehearsed quietly with Smith and Qureshi in their bedrooms so they would not disturb the rest of the household. The xx were greatly influenced by American R&B producers such as The Neptunes and Timbaland, whose minimalist productions incorporated vocal harmonies, clapping percussion, unconventional samples and pronounced beats. The band covered Aaliyah's "Hot Like Fire" (1997), Womack & Womack's "Teardrops" (1988) and other past R&B hits when they performed live and recorded their demos.

After posting the demos on their Myspace page, the xx drew the interest of Young Turks, an imprint label of XL Recordings. They submitted the demos to XL's head office at Ladbroke Grove and were subsequently signed to a recording contract. The group worked with producers such as Diplo and Kwes, to no success before they were introduced to the audio engineer Rodaidh McDonald by the xx's manager Caius Pawson, who gave him three CDs of demos titled "Early Demos", "Recorded in Rehearsal Space" and "What Producers Did Wrong". McDonald was impressed by the intimate quality and use of silence on the demos, which both he and the band felt may have challenged other producers who wanted to incorporate their individual tastes: "They'd worked with about four other producers before then that had – and no discredit to them – I guess they'd seen a lot of space to add a kind of stamp on. There was a lot of empty space in the xx's music, even then, in the 'Early Demos'. But we just found that the best stuff was the most sparse."

== Recording and production ==
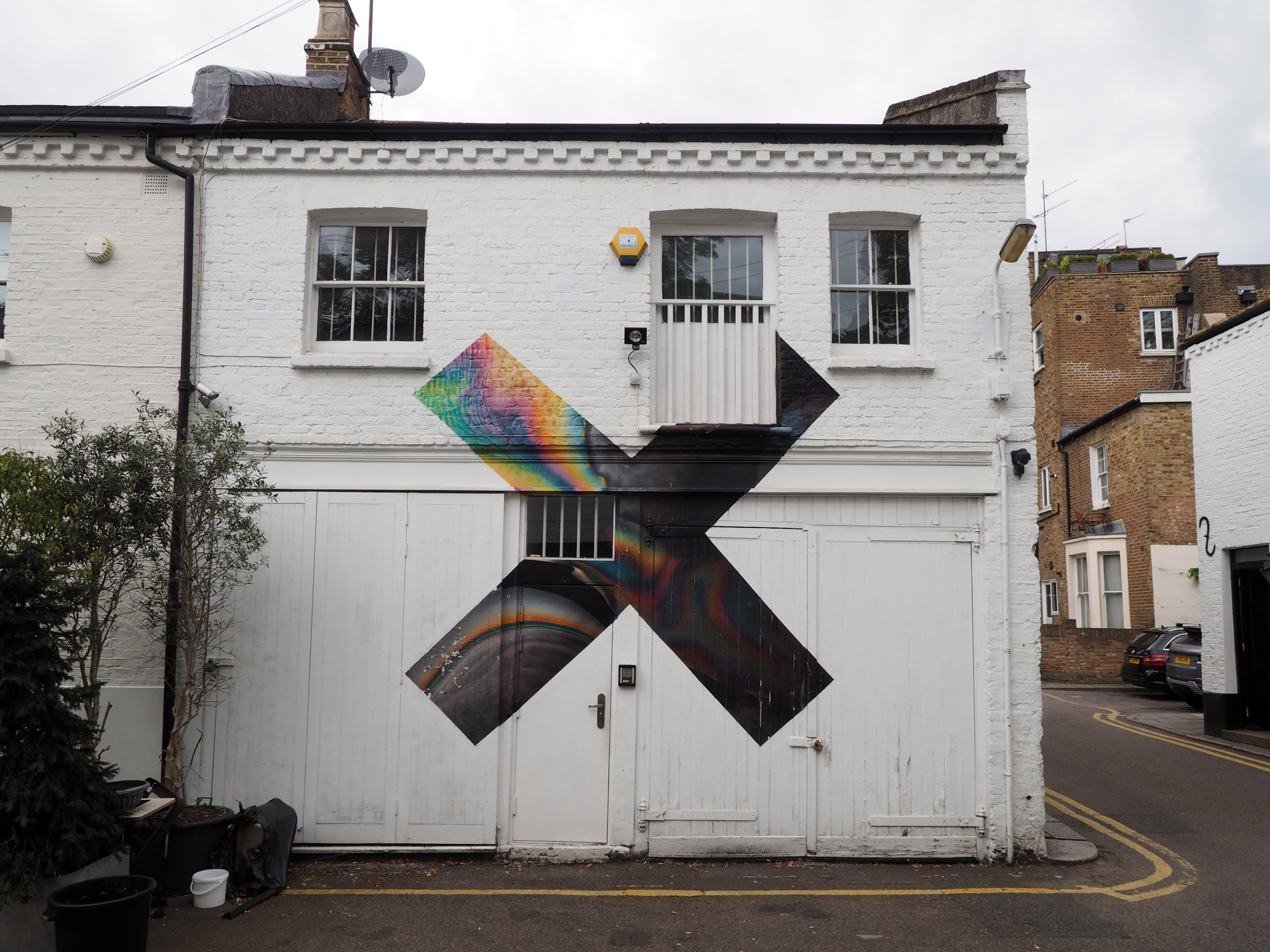
The headquarters of XL Recordings in Ladbroke Grove, London

At the behest of XL's owner Richard Russell, the xx recorded their debut album at the label's small, in-house recording studio – XL Studio – making them the first act to record there. It was once the head office building's rear garage before Russell transformed it at the beginning of 2008 into a makeshift writing, rehearsal and demo space for XL's artists. McDonald was assigned in September to manage and properly equip the room, which he liked because it was soundproof and "isolated from the rest of the office, so it wasn't like you were working in the record company's presence." Croft, on the other hand, called it a "pretty confined space" the size of a bathroom. Over the next few months, McDonald and Pawson prepared a budget for the label to fund the studio's preliminary setup, which would have recording equipment specifically suited for the xx, including a modestly sized soundboard ideal for recording a small group.

The xx started to record the album in December 2008 with McDonald, who engineered the sessions. They would usually record at night after XL's staff had left, which Croft said made it feel "isolated and quite creepy". To reproduce the sound he had heard on the band's demos, McDonald had them write down their instruments' settings and test different areas of the studio to determine where he should record each member. Sim, who played a Precision Bass manufactured in the 1970s, was often recorded in the hallway outside the studio with a Fender Bassman, one of several amplifiers McDonald experimented with for xx. Some of Qureshi and Croft's guitars were also done in the hallway. Qureshi played a Gibson SG with a Fender Hot Rod Deluxe or Blues Deluxe amplifier, while Croft played an Epiphone Les Paul on most of the album and a Gibson ES-335 on a few songs. For her lead guitar parts, Croft used a delay pedal and a Roland Micro Cube amplifier with a reverb setting, which McDonald felt would best replicate her "icy", echo-filled sound on the demos.

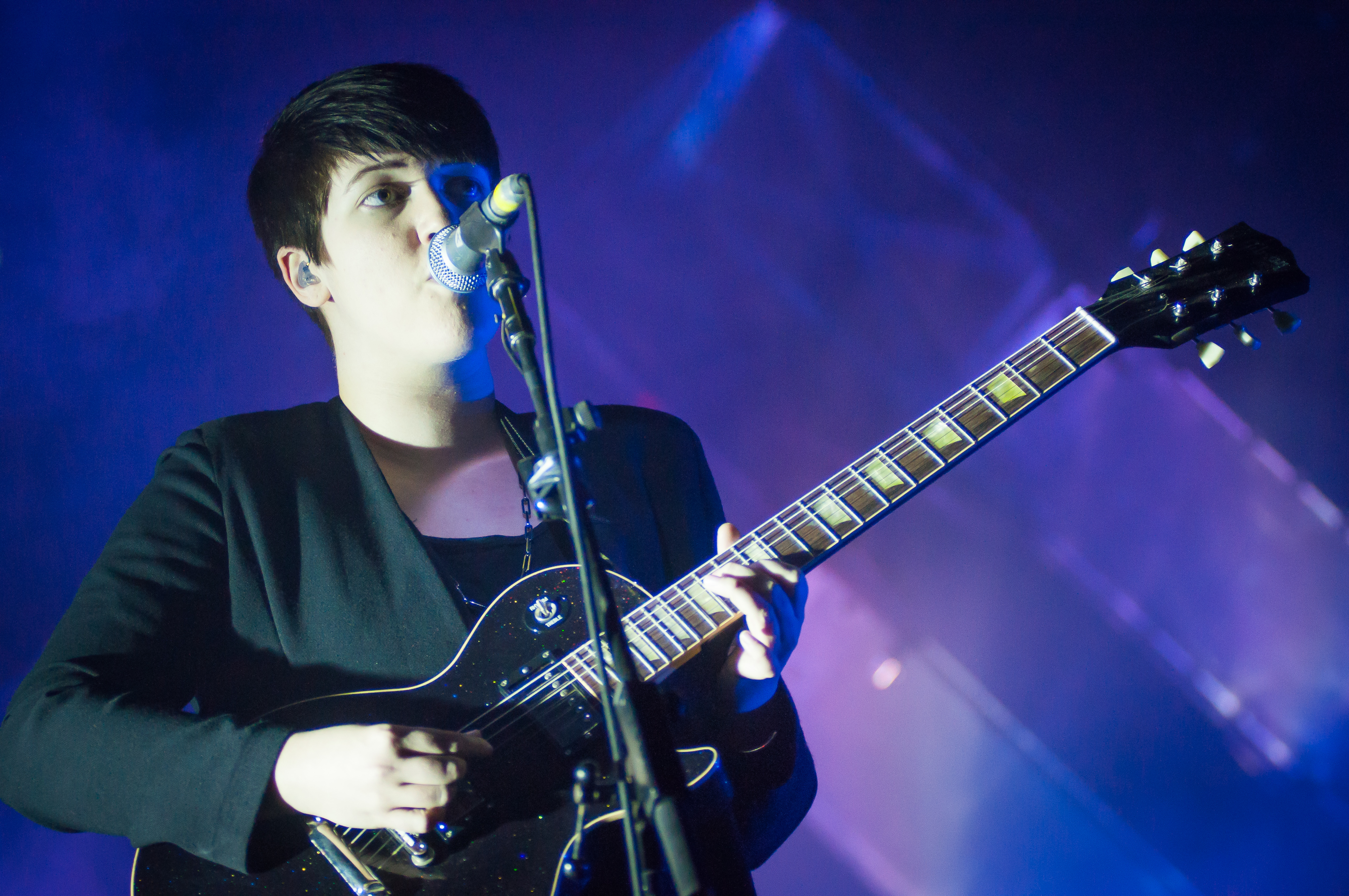
Romy Madley Croft in 2012 with an Epiphone Les Paul, her guitar for xx

After all the instrumental elements had been tracked, Croft and Sim recorded their vocals together, rarely singing backup to one another on any of the songs. McDonald believed it was important for the singers to be "in sync" and share the same mental state or mood when performing full takes of songs, some of which he said benefited from when they were both "quite tired and emotional". He had Croft and Sim sing into Neumann microphones on most of the songs in order to make their vocals sound as "intimate" and conversational as possible. The microphones were among the more expensive items he borrowed for the studio's preliminary setup so XL would not be overwhelmed with a costly budget.

Despite McDonald's close involvement, the xx had been encouraged to self-produce their album by Russell; he believed it would remain faithful to both the band's distinctive live sound and the DIY ethic practised at XL since its beginnings as a rave label. Smith was chosen by the rest of the group to produce xx. He used Logic 8 recording software on his Mac Pro and often worked late nights in a nearby conference room while they recorded in the studio with drafts of his beats. Smith produced rhythm tracks with an Akai MPC sampler, which he occasionally processed through a Roland RE-201 and other effects units. He also created click tracks for the rest of the band to keep timing when they recorded their individual parts. After those parts had been recorded, he refined and incorporated his beats into the songs for three to four weeks. Croft trusted that Smith, who did not want to conceal any imperfections by overproducing xx, would make it practical for them to perform live rather than layer the songs with several guitar or vocal elements.

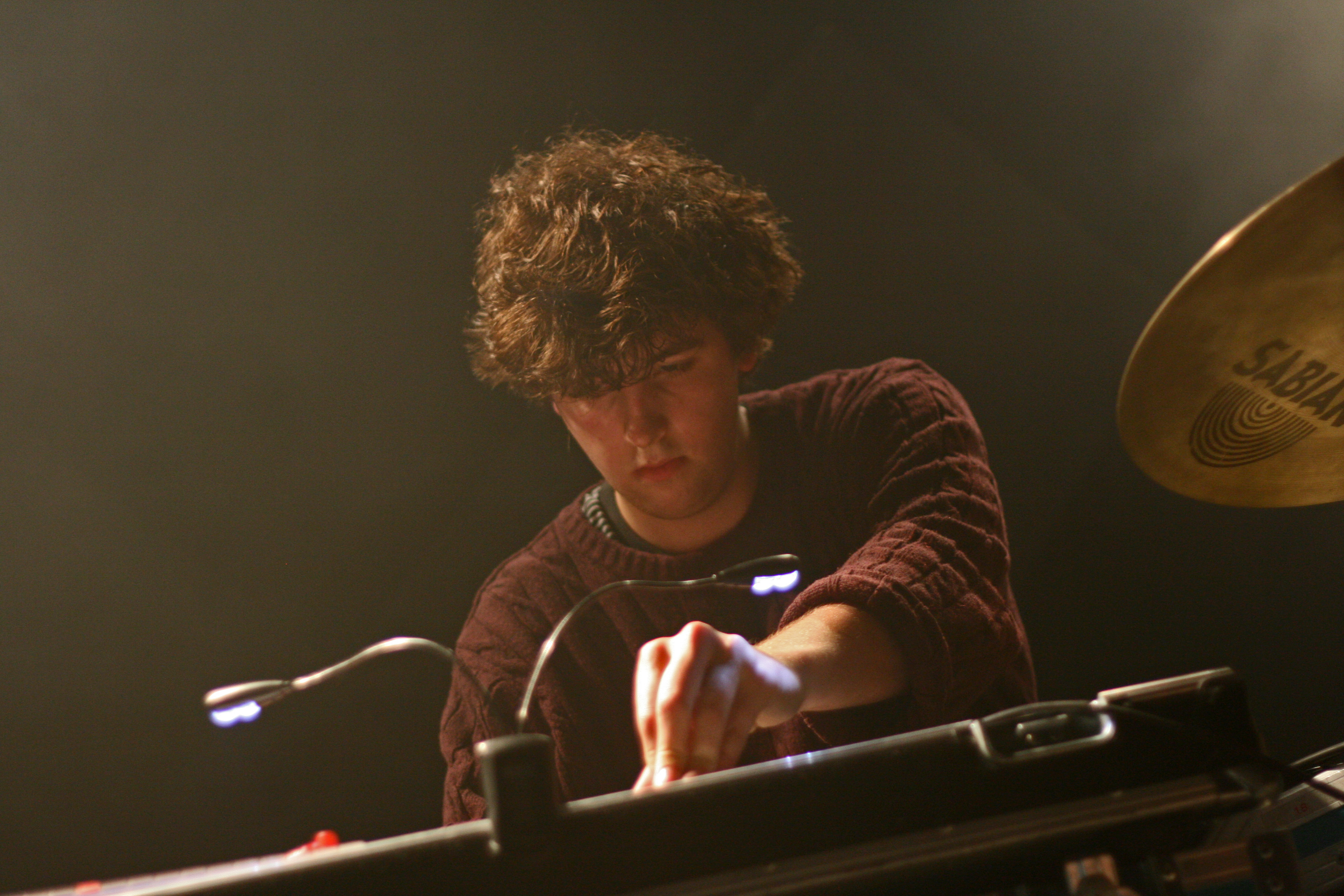
The album was mixed and produced by Jamie Smith (2010).

Most of xx was recorded from late December 2008 to late January 2009 before McDonald and Smith began an exhaustive mixing process, which lasted two weeks. For each song, they mixed one or two tracks of each instrument and used Waves Audio components to equalise the recordings. Having enjoyed how the demos captured unintended background noises such as street sounds, McDonald deliberately left certain sounds that would have otherwise been unwanted in the final mix. "I wanted it to sound like people in a room, rather than this polished kind of perfect crystalline thing", he explained. "It was all the small details that we really liked."

In February 2009, the group wrote and recorded "Fantasy", "Shelter" and "Infinity" before finishing xx, possibly by month's end according to McDonald; the album's liner notes credited the final date of recording as April. Sim sang his vocals for "Infinity" on the side of the studio opposite from Croft after his microphone had been unintentionally moved there, which resulted in a distant-sounding vocal exchange on the song. While recording "Shelter", a mechanical part from the guitar amplifier loosened and caused it to make a clattering sound, which McDonald and the xx chose to retain. "It was just like this missing piece of percussion that the track needed!", McDonald recalled.

== Music ==
"Heart Skipped a Beat"
"Heart Skipped a Beat" ruminates on a lost romantic connection over short guitar figures and a clapping rhythm.

The songs on xx are composed around a framework of basslines and beats, while incorporating simple guitar riffs for melody, rhythm and texture; their melodic notes are separated by rests. Croft said the band's style of instrumentation became defined by the limited equipment they originally used: "My guitar sound pretty much came from discovering there was reverb on my little practice amp and really loving the mood it created." The loudest song, "Intro", is a largely instrumental recording with double-tracked beats, distorted keyboard, non-lexical vocables and a guitar riff. Songs such as "Crystalised" and "VCR" begin with a melodic ostinato and some understated sounds, including a xylophone on the latter, before leading to quietly sung verses. Croft and Sim exchange verses on "Crystalised" while backed by the sound of drum stick clicks and basslines before the beat is heard. On the austerely arranged "Night Time", Croft sings its first two minutes over only guitar and bass before its beat develops. "Fantasy" is highlighted by a shoegazing guitar sound.

While McDonald observes a predominant R&B element, Russell feels the xx's music evokes the early hip hop records he listened to when he was young, as they are often limited to vocals, samples and beats. Music journalists, however, infer from xx that their influences are alternative rock acts such as Portishead, Young Marble Giants and Cocteau Twins, the last of which Croft said she had never heard before the album was released. The Scotsman describes xx as a minimalist, melancholic indie pop record that draws on elements from electronica and R&B, as well as The Cure and other alternative groups. According to Sarah Boden of The Observer, the album's unadorned, dream pop love songs are reminiscent of Cocteau Twins and Mazzy Star, because they feature low tempos, moody melodies and rhythms influenced by R&B and dubstep. Their arrangements have what Neil McCormick calls "a very British, industrial aspect", somewhat similar to the dub-inflected post-punk sound of the English producer Martin Hannett and his work with the band Joy Division. Both Croft and Sim said their combination of seemingly disparate influences could be attributed to the variety in each band member's music collection.

=== Lyrics ===
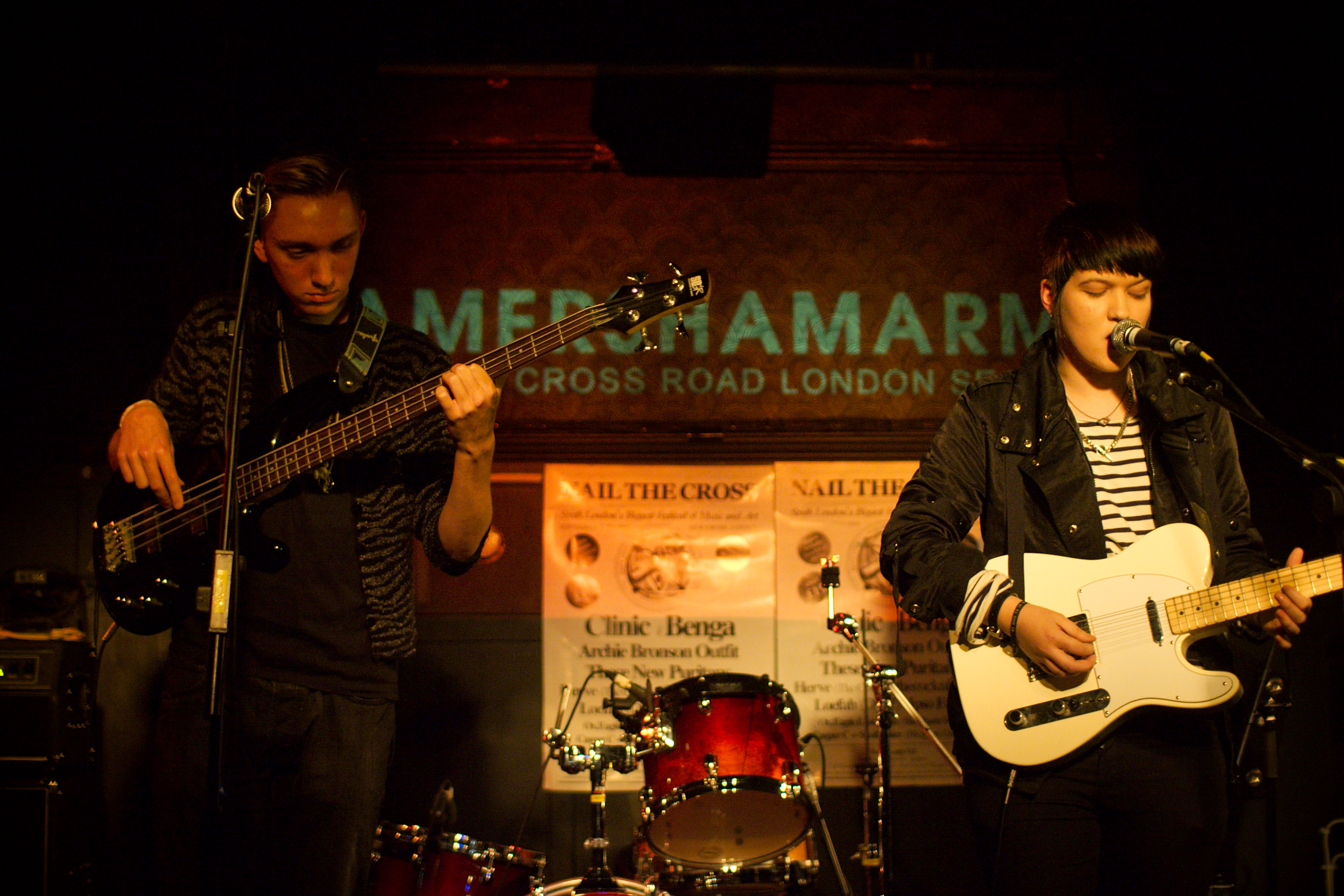
Oliver Sim (left) and Croft (right), the band's lyricists, in 2008

On xx, Croft and Sim touch on themes of love, desire and loss in their songwriting, which Croft said has "always been based around emotions, right from the start. My favourite songs are usually quite sad and I think heartbreak is something that so many people can connect with." Like Croft, Sim said he wrote much of his lyrics at night when his emotions ran "a bit higher". Because of their reserved personalities, Robert Christgau believes they rely on a low-key, vulnerable style and exchange "ideas about intimacy as contemporaries, comrades, prospects, lovers, ex-lovers and friends". According to NME magazine's Emily Mackay, all of the songs deal with the consuming emotions associated with first love, including the tacit intimacy on "VCR", the yearning expressed on "Heart Skipped a Beat" and the premature affection warned of on "Crystalised". Petra Davis from The Quietus argues that the thematic crux of xx is in the succession of songs from "Islands" to "Shelter", each of which sees "a radical shift in perspective on a similar – perhaps a single – love story."

The album's Roman numeral title refers to each of the band members having turned 20 years old by the time xx was released. Because of their age, many critics interpret the songs as nocturnal depictions of adolescent lust. Philip Sherburne writes in Spin that xx brims with a "young lust" often found in rock music, and recordings such as "Fantasy" and "Shelter" express a jaded yearning, particularly in a lyric from the latter song: "Can I make it better with the lights turned on". Croft vehemently denied this: "We were writing these songs when we were 17. I can honestly say I've never thought this is about my sex life." Croft and Sim, who are both gay, did not intend for the songs to be heard as romantic duets; she said they are singing "past each other" rather than to each other. Having combined their individually written lyrics, they could not definitely explain what their songs were about, although Croft said Sim's lyrics resonated with her nonetheless and enjoyed the personal interpretation it offered. "You can put them into your own life", she explained, "like, 'Oh, this is my song.'" The romantic situations Sim wrote of had been inspired by other people. "I hadn't really had any relationships to be working off, but I had a huge interest in life, and looking at other people's relationships around me", he said.

== Marketing ==
Major UK media outlets largely ignored the xx at first, including BBC Radio 1 (logo pictured).

"Crystalised" was released as the xx's debut single on 27 April 2009 and helped build interest in the band among listeners and journalists. It was part of a series of singles from xx, which included "Basic Space" on 3 August, "Islands" on 26 October and "VCR" on 25 January 2010. The band's music was largely ignored by BBC Radio 1 in the United Kingdom, and other major media outlets also believed they did not warrant strong attention; one editor from NME said at the time that the band was not ideal for their magazine's front cover. In the United States, the group benefited from the word-of-mouth marketing of blogs, beginning when they performed six consecutive sold-out shows at New York City clubs such as Pianos and the Mercury Lounge months prior to the album's release.

Several of the songs from xx were licensed by XL to television programmes in the UK and North America. "Intro" became widely used as theme music in television, including sports highlights, episodes of series such as Law & Order and Cold Case, an advertisement for AT&T and BBC's coverage of the 2010 British general election. Along with their placement in television, songs from the record were used by North American chain stores such as Starbucks and Urban Outfitters as background music at their locations. According to McCormick in 2010, these marketing strategies helped the xx develop enough media presence to garner "over half a million sales around the world without ever having anything as vulgar as a hit". Kris Chen, XL's A&R senior vice-president, believed the exposure was desired and necessary for promoting an album that was not "driven by pop radio". Although the band realised their music had to be marketed somehow, Croft expressed reservations about "putting our music on everything, just to put it to anything just for the sake of money".

== Critical reception ==
Professional ratings
Aggregate scores
Source	Rating
AnyDecentMusic?	8.1/10
Metacritic	87/100
Review scores
Source	Rating
AllMusic	5/5 stars
The A.V. Club	A
The Daily Telegraph	4/5 stars
The Guardian	4/5 stars
The Irish Times	4/5 stars
MSN Music (Consumer Guide)	A
NME	8/10
Pitchfork	8.7/10
Rolling Stone	4/5 stars
The Sunday Times	4/5 stars

xx was released by Young Turks in August 2009 to widespread critical acclaim. At Metacritic, which assigns a normalised rating out of 100 to reviews from professional publications, the album received an average score of 87, based on 25 reviews. According to Alexis Petridis, it was the most acclaimed album of the year.

Critics particularly praised the xx's sound on the album; Simon Price wrote in The Independent that they were being universally lauded for their "atmospheric indie rock, and rightly so". The Daily Telegraph's Jack Arnhold regarded xx as "one of this year's most beautiful and original debut albums". Reviewing for The New Yorker, Sasha Frere-Jones remarked that the album rewards repeated listens because of the band's disciplined playing, while Mark Edwards of The Sunday Times said it succeeds with simple but "very near perfect" pop songs. AllMusic's Heather Phares called the instrumentation impeccable and was impressed by how poised and refined such a young group sounds. In The Irish Times, Jim Carroll said the exceptional chemistry behind Croft and Sim's melancholic duets is the highlight of "this drop-dead gorgeous dream-pop symphony". Matthew Cole from Slant Magazine believed their rapport gives an emotional weight to the music, which he said sounds timeless and capable of appealing to both indie and popular tastes. Christgau, writing in MSN Music, was somewhat more impressed by the music than by the lyrics, although he said the underlying force behind the singers' charmingly minimalist songs is a "spiritual dimension" offered by their ability to "shift roles without ever seeming hostile, cold or even unsupportive".

Some reviewers had reservations. Jon Caramanica of The New York Times felt the singers are too disengaged and reticent to reveal any genuine emotion. "Though they're singing to each other, it rarely feels intimate", he wrote, "more like two shy teenagers, eyes cast downward, awkwardly talking to the ground". In the opinion of PopMatters' critic Ben Schumer, the consistent structures and tempos of the songs makes them sound somewhat monotonous on what is an otherwise affecting nocturnal mood piece. Conversely, Joshua Errett from Now found the music and singing mesmerising but lamented the lyrics, which he deemed emotionally immature and "overwrought".

At the end of 2009, xx appeared on several critics' lists of the year's best albums, including rankings of ninth by Rolling Stone, sixth by Uncut, third by Pitchfork, second by NME and fourth by the Chicago Tribune critic Greg Kot. The Guardian named it the year's best record in their annual critics poll and Tim Jonze, the newspaper's editor, hailed it as not only "the sound of 2009, [but also] a distinctive musical statement of the like we may never get to hear again". It also finished seventh in The Village Voice's Pazz & Jop poll of American critics and third in HMV's Poll of Polls, an annual list compiled by the British music retailer HMV and collated from best-album nominations made by journalists in the English and Irish music press. In decade-end lists of the greatest records from the 2000s, The Sunday Times and its sister paper, The Times, ranked xx seventy-seventh and thirtieth, respectively. The record was also included in the 2010 edition of Robert Dimery's music reference book 1001 Albums You Must Hear Before You Die.

== Sales and legacy ==
xx was not an immediate chart success, but eventually became a sleeper hit. It debuted at number 36 on the UK's Official Albums Chart and sold 4,180 copies in the first week after it was released, while in the United States it did not chart higher than number 92 on the Billboard 200. The album sold steadily for the next 44 weeks until July 2010, when it experienced a sharp increase in sales and a jump from number 44 to 16 on the British chart following its announcement as a nominee for the Mercury Prize, an annual award given to the best album from the UK and Ireland. By then, it had sold more than 150,000 copies in the UK and 179,000 copies in the US. Before the nominations shortlist had been announced, bookmakers and critics considered the xx as favourites to win the award over the more high-profile artists Corinne Bailey Rae, Paul Weller and Dizzee Rascal. The album remained in the top 20 of the UK chart in the weeks leading up to the Mercury Prize ceremony in September. Immediately after its win that week, it climbed from number 16 to 3 on its highest weekly sales – 28,666 copies – and reached a total of 212,835 copies sold. McCormick, one of the critics who predicted its victory, explained that it "seemed the record that most represented Britain" with its charmingly intimate style and unique take on modern pop tastes, while citing its win as "a rare example of the Mercury Prize doing music lovers a service".

By December 2010, xx had sold 325,000 copies in the UK and was certified platinum by the British Phonographic Industry. In the US, the album reached 350,000 copies sold by June 2012 with consistent weekly sales during its first two years of release, which Time magazine's Melissa Locker said was "quite a feat" in an era of music piracy, media streaming and YouTube. Adding to its commercial success, songs from the album were covered by a variety of major recording artists, including Shakira, Gorillaz and Orchestral Manoeuvres in the Dark.

The xx's self-titled debut remains one of the great sleeper hits of the last decade. No one – including, it’s fair to say, the xx themselves – expected that their murmuring blend of turn-of-the-millennium R&B and C86 indie pop would go on to sell a million copies and become hugely influential.

— Mark Richardson (Pitchfork, 2017)

Although xx had been highly anticipated by XL, the album's success exceeded expectations in the press. McDonald said their direction and sound would have been entirely different had expectations been higher, while Croft was "baffled" by the acclaim given to what she viewed as an album they had made "for themselves". Sim had mixed feelings about its success, believing it could affect his songwriting in the future: "This album was done with no expectations. No one knew who we were. When I was writing the songs, I didn't think anyone other than Romy or James would ever actually hear them. Now I know so many people will. I might feel I have to be a bit more private."

At the Mercury Prize ceremony, Sim said the time since the album's release had "felt like a haze", but that the event served as "a moment of clarity". In their acceptance speech, the xx announced they would use the £20,000 prize money to build their own studio, where they subsequently wrote and recorded their second album Coexist. When Coexist debuted in September 2012, xx was still on the British chart at number 37 and had sold 446,734 copies in the UK. The following year, it was ranked number 237 on NME's list of the top 500 albums of all time and named the 74th greatest debut record by Rolling Stone, who found its music radical as "an exercise in restraint, in the artful use of space and silence" during popular music's period of maximalism.

In subsequent years, xx proved highly influential as many indie bands and mainstream pop acts incorporated the record's distinctive musical characteristics into their own songs. Petridis later wrote that to his surprise much of 2016's best-selling singles "sounded oddly but irrefutably" like the album: "You can hear its muted, echoing guitars on everything from the Chainsmokers' 'Don't Let Me Down' to Shawn Mendes' 'Stitches' to Zara Larsson's 'Lush Life'." Ryan Tedder, who wrote hit songs for such top-selling singers as Beyoncé, Taylor Swift and Ariana Grande, said the xx's "hauntingness" on the record "gets referenced in at least every other [writing] session".

By January 2017, xx had reached 562,400 copies sold in the UK, and in September 2019, its sales there were reported at 612,000. That same month, it placed 26th on The Guardian's poll of 45 music writers ranking the 100 best albums from the 21st century. In an essay accompanying the list, the newspaper's music editor Ben Beaumont-Thomas said the album features "the most compelling duets of the period: rather than singing to each other, it was as if two people were going through the same thing without the other knowing it – the perfect mood music for the disconnected interconnection of dating apps and social media."

== Touring ==
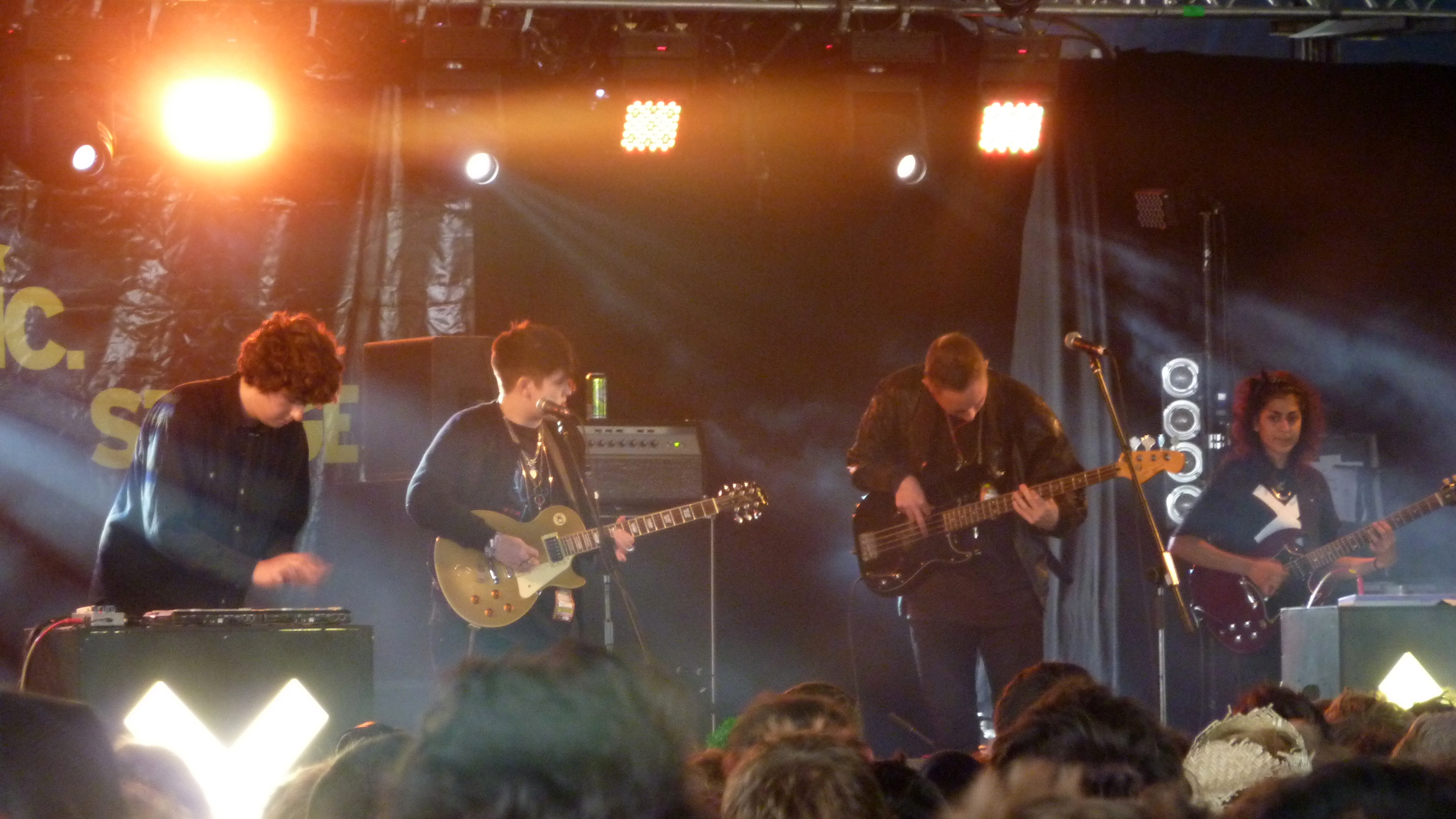
The band performing at the Reading Festival in August 2009

After xx was released, the xx toured Europe and North America through the end of 2009. Their first show in August was at Hoxton Hall in London, which Sim recalled was attended by only 112 people. When Pitchfork's positive review of the album elicited greater interest among American listeners, the xx were booked as the supporting act for the Friendly Fires's tour of larger club venues in the US. The difficulties of touring early on exacerbated the growing tensions between Qureshi and the rest of the group, which culminated in her dismissal after a difficult stay at an October music festival in New York. It was reported that she had become fatigued and left the group after they cancelled several concerts. Sim disputed those reports and said her departure had been the band's decision: "We've grown up to be very different people. It wasn't working any more musically or as a friendship." Croft told NME in November, "I guess 'personal differences' would be the standard way to say it. I guess it's just the intensity of being on tour, things are so much heightened."

Rather than find a replacement for Qureshi, the xx continued to tour as a smaller line-up of guitar, bass and percussion. They also reduced their already minimalist arrangements for songs in concert, although Sim jokingly said Smith "needs another few arms so he can work everything" after Qureshi's departure. In their shows, Croft abandoned playing solos and chords in favour of less defined figures and motifs, while Smith performed beats and ambient sounds from his synth pad as an accompaniment to Croft and Sim's playing. Because their style had been suited to the small venues they first played, the xx focused more on the production value of their concerts and performing for larger audiences while on tour. They dressed in dark clothing and illuminated the stage with light boxes displaying their x-shaped, white-on-black logo.

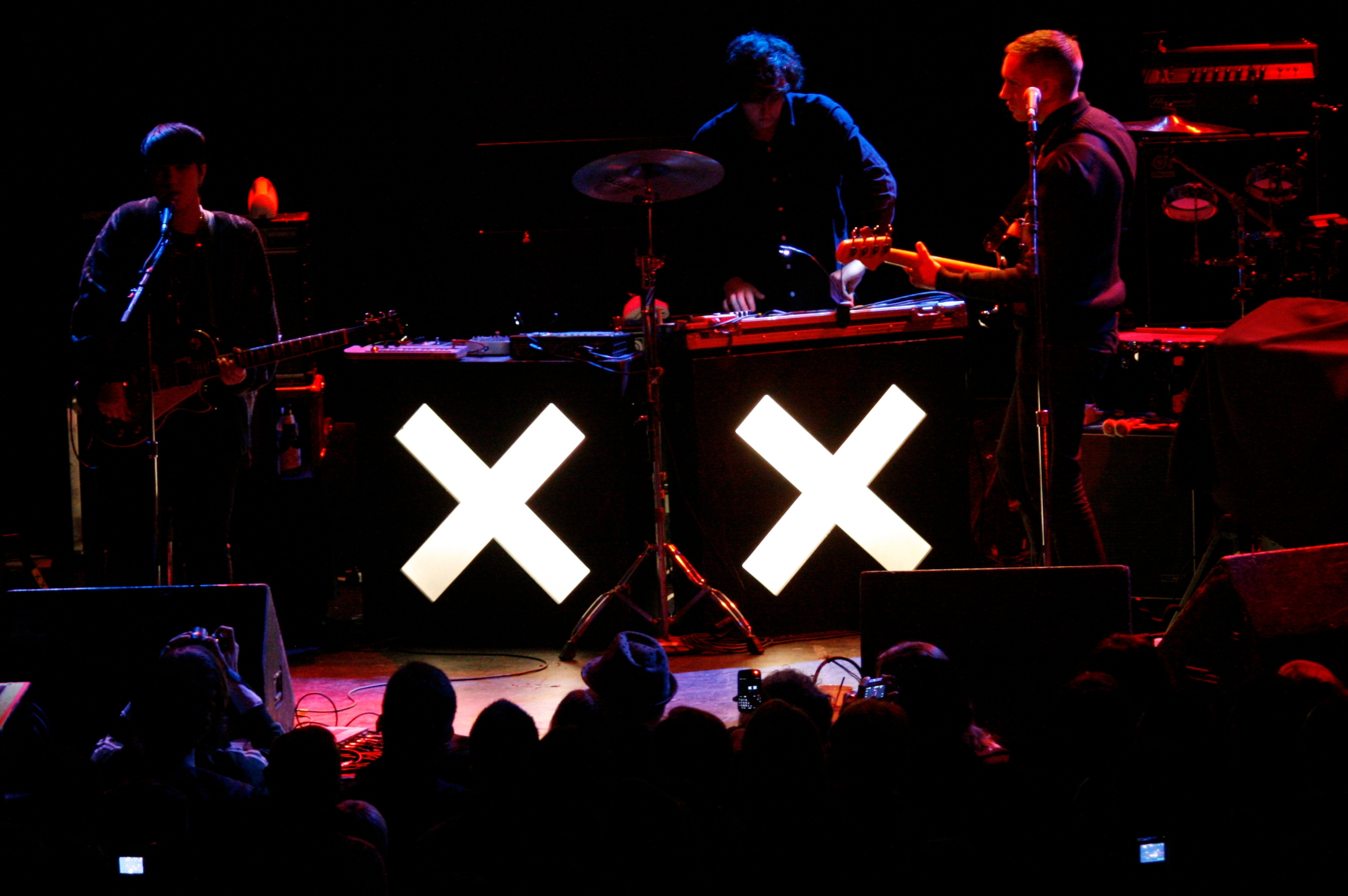
After Baria Qureshi's departure, the xx toured as a trio (at the Phoenix Concert Theatre in December 2009).

With a growing fanbase, the xx made commitments to more concerts and extended their tour for the album. They toured intermittently for 18 months, including most of 2010. That year, they embarked on their first US tour and played high-profile festivals such as South by Southwest, Coachella and Bonnaroo. They were also a supporting act for fellow English group Florence and the Machine. Recalling the xx's show at Coachella, where they performed for 30,000 people, Croft said: "That was the moment when I was, like, Oh, my God, I think people might be into this."

By touring frequently, the xx broadened their reputation among listeners and the press. In March 2010, they played two consecutive nights at the Shepherd's Bush Empire in London to capacity crowds and appeared on the cover of NME, who proclaimed them "the most underrated band in Britain". In April and May, they toured the southern US and Japan, which Croft said was most demanding part of the tour because "none of us had been away from home continuously for so long." They were accompanied during this six-week period by the photographer Jamie-James Medina, who later published his photos of the group in his book The Tourist (2010).

While on tour, the xx acclimated themselves to the increased attention and became considerably more sociable and confident. As Sim recounted, "If you'd have put me onstage at London's Shepherd's Bush Empire a few years ago, I'd have run away. I couldn't have done it. We used to be terrified." In June 2010, the band played the Glastonbury Festival in Somerset and, according to the journalist Jude Rogers, displayed a newfound confidence through the rest of their summer and "post-Mercury [Prize] autumn" concerts: "Croft would sing more boldly, Sim developed an onstage swagger and Smith began experimenting with different rhythms and textures."

== Track listing ==
All lyrics are written by Oliver Sim and Romy Madley Croft, except where noted; all music is composed by Baria Qureshi, Jamie Smith, Sim and Croft, except where noted.

No.	Title	Length
1.	"Intro"	2:07
2.	"VCR"	2:57
3.	"Crystalised"	3:21
4.	"Islands"	2:40
5.	"Heart Skipped a Beat"	4:02
6.	"Fantasy" (lyrics by Sim)	2:38
7.	"Shelter" (lyrics by Croft; music by Smith, Sim and Croft)	4:30
8.	"Basic Space"	3:08
9.	"Infinity"	5:13
10.	"Night Time"	3:36
11.	"Stars"	4:22
Total length:		38:34

iTunes Store bonus track
No.	Title	Length
12.	"Hot Like Fire" (Aaliyah cover)	3:31

Limited deluxe vinyl edition bonus track
No.	Title	Length
12.	"VCR" (Matthew Dear Remix)	4:54

Rough Trade limited edition bonus disc
No.	Title	Length
1.	"Do You Mind?" (Kyla cover)	3:47
2.	"Hot Like Fire" (Aaliyah cover)	3:34
3.	"Teardrops" (Womack & Womack cover)	3:50

Vinyl edition
No.	Title	Length
1.	"Intro"	2:07
2.	"VCR"	2:57
3.	"Crystalised"	3:21
4.	"Islands"	2:40
5.	"Heart Skipped a Beat"	4:02
6.	"Hot Like Fire" (Aaliyah cover)	3:31
7.	"Fantasy"	2:38
8.	"Shelter"	4:30
9.	"Basic Space"	3:08
10.	"Infinity"	5:13
11.	"Night Time"	3:36
12.	"Stars"	4:22

Deluxe edition
No.	Title	Length
12.	"Teardrops"	3:51
13.	"Do You Mind?"	3:37
14.	"Hot Like Fire"	3:32
15.	"Blood Red Moon (Demo)"	2:13
16.	"Insects" (B-Side of "VCR")	2:29

== Personnel ==
Credits are adapted from the album's liner notes.

The xx

- Romy Madley Croft – guitar, vocals
- Oliver Sim – bass, vocals
- Jamie Smith – beats, MPC, production, mixing
- Baria Qureshi – keyboards, guitar
- The xx – photography, design

Additional personnel

- Rodaidh McDonald – mixing, engineering
- Nilesh Patel – mastering
- Phil Lee – art direction, design

== Charts ==
=== Weekly charts ===
Weekly chart performance for xx
Chart (2009–2012)	Peak position
Australian Albums (ARIA)	40
Austrian Albums (Ö3 Austria Top 40)	24
Belgian Albums (Ultratop Flanders)	9
Belgian Albums (Ultratop Wallonia)	41
Canadian Albums (Billboard)	91
Chinese Albums (Sino Chart)	12
Danish Albums (Hitlisten)	32
Dutch Albums (Album Top 100)	29
European Albums (Billboard)	12
Finnish Albums (Suomen virallinen lista)	10
French Albums (SNEP)	35
German Albums (Offizielle Top 100)	54
Greek International Albums (IFPI)	41
Irish Albums (IRMA)	14
Irish Independent Albums (IRMA)	1
New Zealand Albums (RMNZ)	13
Norwegian Albums (VG-lista)	23
Scottish Albums (OCC)	4
Spanish Albums (PROMUSICAE)	73
Swedish Albums (Sverigetopplistan)	39
Swiss Albums (Swiss Hitparade)	52
UK Albums (OCC)	3
UK Independent Albums (OCC)	1
US Billboard 200	92
US Independent Albums (Billboard)	9

=== Year-end charts ===
2009 year-end chart performance for xx
Chart (2009)	Position
Belgian Albums (Ultratop Flanders)	98
French Albums (SNEP)	182

2010 year-end chart performance for xx
Chart (2010)	Position
Belgian Albums (Ultratop Flanders)	18
European Albums (Billboard)	71
French Albums (SNEP)	148
UK Albums (OCC)	36
US Independent Albums (Billboard)	15

== Certifications ==
Certifications for xx
Region	Certification	Certified units/sales
Australia (ARIA)	Gold	35,000^{^}
Belgium (BRMA)	Gold	15,000^{*}
Canada (Music Canada)	Platinum	80,000^{‡}
Denmark (IFPI Danmark)	Platinum	20,000^{‡}
Germany (BVMI)	Gold	100,000^{^}
Italy (FIMI)	Gold	25,000^{‡}
New Zealand (RMNZ)	Platinum	15,000^{‡}
United Kingdom (BPI)	2× Platinum	612,000
United States (RIAA)	Gold	500,000^{^}
^{*} Sales figures based on certification alone.^{^} Shipments figures based on certification alone.^{‡} Sales+streaming figures based on certification alone.

== Release history ==
Release history for xx
Region	Date
Australia	14 August 2009
Germany	14 August 2009
Ireland	14 August 2009
United Kingdom	17 August 2009
United States	6 October 2009

== See also ==
- List of Irish Independent Albums Chart number-one albums of 2010
- List of number-one hits of 2010 (France)
- List of UK Indie Chart number-one albums of 2010

== Bibliography ==
- Anon. (27 December 2009). "Animal Collective Top HMV's Annual Poll of Polls". Hot Press. Dublin. Archived from the original on 6 October 2015.
- Anon. (21 November 2009). "The 100 Best Pop Albums of the Noughties". The Times. London.
- Anon. (13 December 2009). "Top 30 Albums of the 2000s". The Sunday Times. London.
- Anon. (2009). xx (CD liner notes). The xx. London: Young Turks. YT031.
- Anon. (5 March 2010). "Interview: The xx – xx Make Their Mark with XL Records". The Scotsman. Edinburgh. Archived from the original on 6 January 2014.
- Anon. (2010). "Best Albums of 2009". Metacritic. Archived from the original on 7 February 2010.
- Anon. (13 September 2010). "X Factor and xx Impact the Charts". Music Week. London. Archived from the original on 13 April 2014.
- Anon. (26 July 2010). "Eminem Leads Hip Hop Double". Music Week. London. Archived from the original on 25 May 2014.
- Anon. (12 January 2010). "Win Deluxe Vinyl Edition of xx". Fact. London. Archived from the original on 19 December 2014.
- Anon. (20 September 2010). "European Top 20 Charts – Week Commencing 20th September 2010" (PDF). The ARIA Report. No. 1073. Archived from the original (PDF) on 18 October 2010.
- Anon. (2010). "Year End Charts – European Top 100 Albums". Billboard. Archived from the original on 30 September 2011.
- Anon. (2010). "Year End Charts – Independent Albums". Billboard. Archived from the original on 4 October 2012.
- Anon. (31 December 2011). "ARIA Charts – Accreditations – 2011 Albums". Australian Recording Industry Association. Archived from the original on 29 September 2014.
- Anon. (22 March 2013). "'xx' - The 100 Best Debut Albums of All Time". Rolling Stone. New York. Archived from the original on 19 September 2015.
- Beaumont-Thomas, Ben; Snapes, Laura; Curtin, April (13 September 2019). "The 100 Best Albums of the 21st Century". The Guardian.
- Anon.[a] (n.d.). "The xx – Crystalised". Young Turks. Archived from the original on 29 June 2014.
- Anon.[b] (n.d.). "The xx – Basic Space". Young Turks. Archived from the original on 29 June 2014.
- Anon.[c] (n.d.). "The xx – Is lands". Young Turks. Archived from the original on 29 June 2014.
- Anon.[d] (n.d.). "The xx – VCR". Young Turks. Archived from the original on 29 June 2014.
- Anon.[e] (n.d.). "XX by The xx reviews". AnyDecentMusic?. Archived from the original on 1 November 2016.
- Anon.[f] (n.d.). "Reviews for xx by The xx". Metacritic. Archived from the original on 24 March 2014.
- Anon.[g] (n.d.). "New York Pazz and Jop Albums". The Village Voice. New York. Archived from the original on 15 August 2014.
- Anon.[h] (n.d.). "xx by The xx". iTunes Store. Archived from the original on 1 November 2014.
- Anon.[i] (n.d.). "xx – The xx | Release Information, Reviews and Credits". AllMusic. Archived from the original on 11 October 2016.
- Anon.[j] (n.d.). "xx: xx [Vinyl]". Amazon. Archived from the original on 29 November 2014.
- Anon.[k] (n.d.). "The xx – xx". Hung Medien. Archived from the original on 23 October 2014.
- Anon.[l] (n.d.). "The xx – Chart History". Billboard. Archived from the original on 6 July 2015.
- Anon.[m] (n.d.). "综合榜 2014年 第18周" [Comprehensive Chart – Year 2014 Week 18] (in Chinese). Sino Chart. Archived from the original on 25 May 2014.
- Anon.[n] (n.d.). "Top 75 Artist Album, Week Ending 9 September 2010". Chart-Track. Irish Recorded Music Association. Archived from the original on 19 December 2014.
- Anon.[o] (n.d.). "Top 10 Independent Artist Albums, Week Ending 9 September 2010". Chart-Track. Irish Recorded Music Association. Archived from the original on 19 December 2014.
- Anon.[p] (n.d.). "2010–09–18 Top 40 Scottish Albums Archive". Official Charts Company.
- Anon.[q] (n.d.). "2010–10–09 Top 40 Independent Albums Archive". Official Charts Company.
- Anon.[r] (n.d.). "Jaaroverzichten 2009" (in Dutch). Ultratop. Archived from the original on 17 January 2015.
- Anon.[s] (n.d.). "Top Albums annuel (physique + téléchargement + streaming)" (in French). SNEP. Archived from the original on 11 August 2018.
- Anon.[t] (n.d.). "Jaaroverzichten 2010" (in Dutch). Ultratop. Archived from the original on 8 October 2014.
- Anon.[u] (n.d.). "Classement Albums – Année 2010" (in French). SNEP. Archived from the original on 5 October 2013.
- Anon.[v] (n.d.). "Top 40 UK Albums of 2010". BBC Radio 1. Archived from the original on 29 December 2010.
- Anon.[w] (n.d.). "Goud en Platina – 2010" (in Dutch). Ultratop. Archived from the original on 9 August 2014.
- Anon.[x] (29 January 2021). "The xx 'xx'" (in Danish). IFPI Denmark.
- Anon.[y] (n.d.). "Gold–/Platin–Datenbank (The xx)" (in German). Bundesverband Musikindustrie. Archived from the original on 13 December 2014.
- Anon.[z] (23 November 2018). "British Album Certifications – The xx – xx". British Phonographic Industry.
- Anon.[aa] (4 December 2013). "American Album Certifications – The xx – xx". Recording Industry Association of America.
- Anon.[bb] (n.d.). "XX". JB Hi-Fi. Archived from the original on 24 May 2014.
- Anon.[cc] (n.d.). "xx – CD" (in German). Musicline.de. Archived from the original on 13 December 2014.
- Anon.[dd] (n.d.). "xx – xx". Tower Records Ireland. Archived from the original on 24 May 2014.
- Anon.[ee] (n.d.). "Canadian album certifications – The xx – xx". Music Canada.
- Arnhold, Jack (13 August 2009). "Young Turks: The xx, CD review". The Daily Telegraph. London. Archived from the original on 24 September 2015.
- Boden, Sarah (11 July 2009). "CD: Pop review: The xx, xx". The Observer. London. Observer Music Monthly section. Archived from the original on 24 December 2014.
- Caramanica, Jon (12 October 2009). "Critics' Choice – New CDs". The New York Times.
- Carroll, Jim (7 August 2009). "Rock/Pop". The Irish Times. Dublin. Archived from the original on 5 October 2016.
- Christgau, Robert (8 December 2009). "The xx: Switching Roles in Song". NPR. Archived from the original on 6 July 2014.
- Christgau, Robert (December 2009). "Consumer Guide". MSN Music. Archived from the original on 25 March 2014.
- Cochrane, Greg (3 September 2012). "The xx: We're in Our Favourite Band Now". Newsbeat. Archived from the original on 20 November 2012.
- Colapinto, John (30 June 2014). "Shy and Mighty". The New Yorker. Archived from the original on 14 August 2014.
- Cole, Matthew (2 October 2009). "The xx: xx". Slant Magazine. Archived from the original on 25 May 2014.
- Copsey, Rob (19 September 2019). "The biggest selling Mercury Prize-winning albums revealed". Official Charts Company.
- Curran, Shaun (7 May 2010). "Isolation Brings The xx Out to the World". The Japan Times. Tokyo. Archived from the original on 27 April 2015.
- Davis, Petra (14 August 2009). "The xx". The Quietus.
- Dimery, Robert, ed. (2010). 1001 Albums You Must Hear Before You Die (Revised and updated ed.). Universe. ISBN 978-0-7893-2074-2.
- Edwards, Mark (16 August 2009). "The xx: xx Review". The Sunday Times. London.
- Errett, Joshua (4 November 2009). "The xx". Now. Toronto. Archived from the original on 31 August 2010.
- Frere-Jones, Sasha (25 January 2010). "Closer". The New Yorker. Archived from the original on 27 April 2015.
- Frost, Matt (July 2011). "Rodaidh McDonald: Recording The xx". Sound on Sound. Cambridge. Archived from the original on 26 August 2014.
- Gaerig, Andrew (28 August 2009). "The xx: xx". Pitchfork. Archived from the original on 10 August 2014.
- Jones, Alan (17 September 2012). "Official Charts Analysis: The xx's Coexist Sells 58k". Music Week. London.
- Jones, Alan (20 January 2017). "Official Charts Analysis: The xx Claim No.1 Spot with Third Album I See You". Music Week.
- Jones, Douglas (9 April 2010). "Young and Modern: Introducing the xx". CNN. Archived from the original on 24 December 2014.
- Jonze, Tim (18 December 2009). "Albums of 2009, No 1: The xx – xx". The Guardian. London. Archived from the original on 15 February 2015.
- Kaye, Ben (25 October 2013). "The Top 500 Albums of All Time, according to NME". Consequence of Sound.
- Kot, Greg (2 April 2010). "British Buzz Band the xx Speaks". Chicago Tribune. Archived from the original on 29 May 2015.
- Lamont, Tom (4 December 2010). "The xx: The Band with the World at Their Feet". The Observer. London. The New Review section. Archived from the original on 29 May 2015.
- Lamont, Tom (1 September 2012). "The xx: 'It's abnormal for bands to share so much'". The Observer. London. Archived from the original on 6 January 2014.
- Lindsay, Cam (November 2009). "The Nocturnal Emissions of the xx". Exclaim!. Toronto. Archived from the original on 18 April 2014.
- Lipshutz, Jason (1 June 2012). "The xx Announce New Album, 'Coexist'". Billboard. New York. Archived from the original on 21 September 2014.
- Locker, Melissa (5 September 2012). "The xx Take Risks, Succeed on Coexist". Time. New York. Archived from the original on 15 August 2014.
- Mackay, Emily (11 August 2009). "Album review: The xx – 'The xx'". NME. London. Archived from the original on 3 September 2014.
- McCormick, Neil (21 July 2010). "The xx: Never Heard of Them? Actually, You Have". The Daily Telegraph. London. Archived from the original on 24 December 2014.
- McCormick, Neil (8 September 2010). "The xx: Making a Big Noise Is Not Their Style". The Daily Telegraph. London. Archived from the original on 29 May 2015.
- Monger, James Christopher (n.d.). "The xx". AllMusic. Archived from the original on 23 August 2014.
- Murray, Robin (13 November 2009). "Guitarist Departs The xx". Clash. London. Archived from the original on 28 October 2014.
- Park, Dave (12 August 2009). "Album Review: The xx – xx". Prefix. Archived from the original on 29 May 2015.
- Peters, Mitchell (9 January 2010). "The XX Factor". Billboard. New York – via Google Books.
- Petridis, Alexis (9 April 2010). "The xx: 'We're very keen not to be... flash'". The Guardian. London. Archived from the original on 14 December 2014.
- Petridis, Alexis (12 January 2017). "The xx: I See You review – stepping out of their own shadow". The Guardian. London. Archived from the original on 17 January 2017.
- Phares, Heather (n.d.). "xx – The xx". AllMusic. Archived from the original on 19 August 2014.
- Price, Simon (15 August 2009). "Album: The XX, XX (Young Turks/XL)". The Independent. London. Archived from the original on 20 August 2016.
- Reed, James; Rodman, Sarah (8 September 2012). "Critic's Picks: Albums". The Boston Globe. Archived from the original on 27 April 2015.
- Richardson, Mark (12 January 2017). "The xx: I See You Album Review". Pitchfork. Archived from the original on 25 January 2017.
- Rizov, Vadim (5 January 2010). "The xx: xx". The A.V. Club. Chicago. Archived from the original on 24 December 2014.
- Rogers, Jude (29 December 2010). "The Sound of Shyness". New Statesman. London. Archived from the original on 8 November 2014.
- Saxelby, Ruth (14 July 2009). "The xx: 'It started as a joke.'". Dummy. Archived from the original on 4 September 2014.
- Schumer, Ben (7 October 2009). "The xx: xx". PopMatters. Archived from the original on 10 February 2014.
- Sheffield, Rob (13 October 2009). "The xx". Rolling Stone. New York. Archived from the original on 19 October 2009.
- Sherburne, Philip (December 2009). "Reviews". Spin. Vol. 25, no. 12. New York – via Google Books.
- Simpson, Dave (13 August 2009). "The xx: 'xx'". The Guardian. London. Film & music section. Archived from the original on 6 January 2014.
