= VCR (song) =

Single by the xx

from the album xx
- B-side: "Insects"; "You Got the Love"
- Released: 24 January 2010
- Genre: Indie pop
- Length: 2:59
- Label: Young Turks
- Songwriters: Oliver Sim and Romy Madley Croft, Baria Qureshi, Jamie Smith
- Producer: The xx

The xx singles chronology
"Islands" (2009)	"VCR" (2010)	"Angels" (2012)

"VCR" is the fourth single by English indie rock band the xx from their self-titled debut album. The single was first released in the UK on 24 January 2010. The song was also featured on the episode "Black Friday" from the television series Lie to Me. Music critic Robert Christgau named it the tenth best single of the year.

== Track listing ==
UK iTunes single

1. "VCR" – 2:59
2. "Insects" – 2:28

UK vinyl

1. "VCR" – 2:59
2. "Insects" – 2:28

VCR (Four Tet Remix) – Single

1. "VCR" (Four Tet Remix) – 4:52

Digital EP

1. "Insects" – 2:28
2. "VCR" (Four Tet Remix) – 8:40
3. "VCR" (Matthew Dear Remix) – 4:52
4. "Shelter" (John Talabot Feel It Too Remix) – 6:49
5. "Night Time" (Greg Wilson Remix) – 8:33

== Chart performance ==
"VCR'" entered the UK Indie Chart on 31 October 2010 at number 15; as well as the UK Singles Chart at number 132, marking the band's second most successful single behind "Islands", which peaked at number 34 in September 2010.

Chart (2010)	Peak position
UK Indie (OCC)	15
UK Singles (OCC)	132

== Certifications ==
Region	Certification	Certified units/sales
United Kingdom (BPI)	Silver	200,000^{‡}
^{‡} Sales+streaming figures based on certification alone.

== Release history ==
Region	Date	Format
United Kingdom	24 January 2010	Digital download
United Kingdom	25 January 2010	7-inch vinyl
United Kingdom	25 October 2010	Digital download

== Cover versions ==
"VCR" was covered by Orchestral Manoeuvres in the Dark. Their version was published at SoundCloud on 18 November 2010 and released as a B-side to "History of Modern (Part I)" on 28 February 2011.

The Antlers released a cover of the song for their 2011 EP.
