= Oliver Sim =

English singer-songwriter (born 1989)

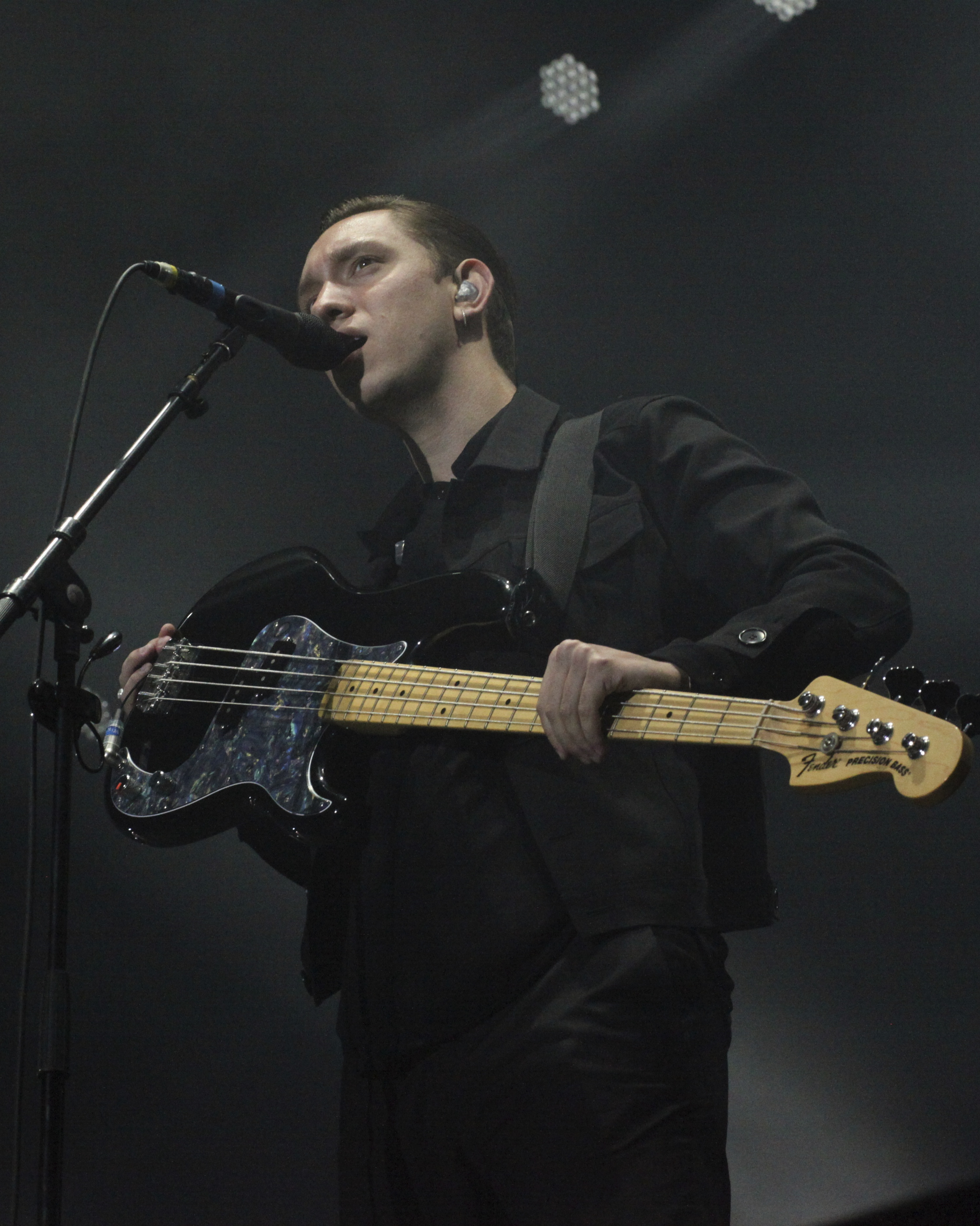
- Sim in 2013

Background information
- Born: 15 June 1989 (age 37); London, England, United Kingdom
- Genres: Indie rock; alternative pop
- Occupations: Musician; singer; songwriter
- Instruments: Vocals; bass; synthesizers
- Years active: 2005–present
- Label: Young
- Member of: The xx
- Website: www.oliver-sim.com

Oliver Sim (born 15 June 1989) is an English singer and bass guitarist. He is a member of the xx and released a solo album, Hideous Bastard, in 2022, which peaked at No. 58 on the UK Albums Chart.

== Music ==
=== The xx ===
Sim met Romy Madley Croft at nursery school in London when they were 3. Sim grew up living in a Fulham council flat with his mother, 5 minutes away from Madley Croft. They attended the same primary school and then met Jamie Smith (Jamie xx) and Baria Qureshi when they were 11, at the induction day for Elliott School, the secondary school they all attended. The future bandmates all studied GCSE Music together. Sim received his first bass guitar on his 14th birthday. Romy and Sim formed the band in 2005, with Qureshi joining in 2006 and Jamie xx shortly thereafter.

The band released their debut album xx in 2009, their second album Coexist in 2012, and their third album I See You in 2017.

=== Solo Work ===
==== 2022-2023: Debut album Hideous Bastard ====
Sim's first solo album draws on queer and horror imagery, as well as a range of pop-culture references, as "he grapples with identity, shame and expectations of masculinity." Sim has described growing up identifying with characters in horror films, the monsters who come back to wreak revenge, as well as the "scream queens" and "final girls", such as Sissy Spacek in Carrie, Sigourney Weaver in Alien, Jamie Lee Curtis in Halloween, or Buffy the Vampire Slayer, as they represent both femininity and anger. The album was produced by Jamie xx.

Sim describes the album's single Fruit as being the first song he has written using the male gendered pronoun, which he never did with the xx, as a significant marker of him being more open about being gay. He described the use of gender non-specific pronouns in the xx, as coming both from an agreement with Romy to make the lyrics universal, but also from a place of insecurity about his sexuality. He describes the song as a love letter to himself as a child/teenager struggling with his sexuality.

The song Hideous was the first time Sim spoke openly about his HIV status. The song features Jimmy Somerville.

Sim has said that his music is influenced by John Grant, Bronski Beat's Jimmy Somerville, who he became friends with during the Covid-19 pandemic.

A short film, Hideous, was created to accompany the album. In the film, "Sim plays an artist who, after coming out on live television and performing the undeniably celebratory Fruit with sensual self-possession, transforms into a clawed, horned and green-skinned monster to exact violence on the production crew that mocks him." Directed by Yann Gonzales, Hideous was first premiered at the 2022 Cannes Film Festival before being released exclusively on Mubi.

Hideous Bastard received a 3-star review from The Guardian, a 4-star review from NME, and a glowing 5-star rating from DIY Magazine.

An orchestral version of Fruit, entitled Fruit (Red, White & Royal Blue Version), was later released in 2023 as part of the soundtrack for the Amazon Prime Video film Red, White & Royal Blue.

==== 2025 ====
In June 2025, Sim and Romy joined their bandmate Jamie xx at Glastonbury Festival to perform Jamie xx's new track Waited All Night. The track was released as a single on 18th September and was also included in Jamie xx's second solo album, In Waves, released two days later.

Sim released his single Obsession in August 2025. It was produced by Bullion and Taylor Skye, the first music Sim had not produced with Jamie xx. It was premiered on BBC 6Music by Nick Grimshaw on 27 August 2025. On this show, Sim stated that the song was about lust and infatuation.

In October 2025, Sim released the single Telephone Games, also produced by Bullion. The single was released with a video directed by Sharna Osborne. Telephone cards were placed in telephone boxes across London to tease the release.

== Modelling ==
Between the xx's second and third albums, Sim modelled for Dior.

Sim also modelled for the rebooted JW Anderson Resort lookbook.

== Personal life ==
Sim has disclosed that he has had issues with alcohol, which led him to deciding to be sober from 2016.

In 2022, Sim stated he has been living with HIV since he was 17 years old.

== Solo discography ==
=== Studio albums ===
- Hideous Bastard (Young, 2022) UK No. 58

=== Singles ===
- Obsession (2025)
- Telephone Games (2025)

=== As featured artist ===
Non-single guest appearances with other performing artists.

Year	Track	Other artist(s)	Album	Refs
2015	Stranger in a Room	Jamie xx	In Colour	
2024	Waited All Night	Jamie xx, Romy	In Waves	

== Awards and nominations ==
Year	Award Ceremony	Category	Work	Result	Refs
2023	Berlin Music Video Awards	Best Bizarre	Hideous	Nominated	
2023	AIM Independent Music Awards	Best Independent Album	Hideous Bastard	Nominated	
2023	AIM Independent Music Awards	Best Independent Remix	GMT remix ft. Jamie xx	Nominated	
