= Rodaidh McDonald =

- Born: Roderick William George McDonald; Edinburgh, Scotland
- Occupations: Music producer, record company executive
- Label: XL
- Website: rodaidhmcdonald.com

Roderick William George "Rodaidh" McDonald is a Scottish record producer, and record company executive. He was born in Edinburgh, Scotland and currently resides in Los Angeles, California, United States. His production and mixing credits include The xx, King Krule, Adele, Sampha, Beck, Weyes Blood, Lykke Li, Daughter, Savages, The Horrors, Bobby Womack, Vampire Weekend, Glaive, Hot Chip, and Gil Scott-Heron.

== Career ==
=== Early career ===
In 2008, McDonald organised Italo disco club nights in London under the 'Cocadisco' brand.

=== XL Recordings ===
Between 2009 and 2019, McDonald worked with XL Recordings, operating as A&R as well as overseeing activities in XL Studio, the label's in-house recording studio. He has worked at XL Studio with a number of acts including The xx, Adele, Sampha, Jai Paul, The Horrors, Bobby Womack, Vampire Weekend, Gil Scott-Heron, and Giggs. He also signed artists including King Krule and Powell.

=== Production ===
McDonald’s production is found across multiple genres and styles, both on and outside of XL.

In 2009, McDonald recorded and mixed The xx's multi-platinum album xx which won the Mercury Music Prize in 2010.

In 2010, McDonald visited Ethiopia with Richard Russell and Nick Zinner. They subsequently released an EP together under the name Fresh Touch.

In 2011, McDonald participated as a producer in Damon Albarn DRC Music project. Collaborating with producers Dan the Automator, XL Recordings, Richard Russell, Jneiro Jarel, Actress, Marc Antoine, Alwest, Remi Kabaka Jr., Totally Enormous Extinct Dinosaurs and Kwes, McDonald went to Kinshasa in DR Congo for one week to record an album called Kinshasa One Two. All proceeds will benefit Oxfam's work in the DRC. The album was released by Warp Records.

In 2012, he continued his relationship with The xx, mixing the band's second album Coexist with Jamie Smith. On 16 September 2012, Coexist entered the UK Albums Chart at number one.

In 2013, McDonald contributed production to albums by Daughter, King Krule, Savages, and Willis Earl Beal amongst others. Savages' album Silence Yourself, was shortlisted for the 2013 Mercury Music Prize.

In an interview with Dazed and Confused in June 2014, McDonald confirmed he was working on a third xx album in New York, Texas, and Iceland. He also confirmed he was working on the debut album for Sampha, as well as UK singer Denai Moore.

On 20 January 2017, I See You by The xx, which was co-produced by McDonald and Jamie Smith, entered the UK Albums Chart at number one. I See You also entered at number one in Australia, Belgium, Germany, Ireland, Portugal, and the Netherlands. In the United States it gained the number 1 position in the sales chart and number 2 in the Billboard 200. In July 2017, it was announced that both I See You and Sampha’s debut, Process, also co-produced by McDonald, had both been nominated for the 2017 Mercury Music Prize, with Process winning the prize in September 2017.

The same year also saw McDonald shortlisted as Producer Of The Year at the 2017 A&R Awards.

A further US No.1 album came in March 2018 when David Byrne's American Utopia, produced by McDonald, Byrne, and Brian Eno, debuted at No.1 in the US Top Album chart and No.3 in The Billboard 200. American Utopia was nominated for 'Best Alternative Music Album' in the 2019 Grammy Awards.

== Discography ==
Year	Artist	Title	Album	Label	Credit
2026	Sylvan Esso	all songs	"Ow ∞"	Psychic Hotline	mixing
2026	Love Spells	Heart For Eyes	“Love Is The Law”	RCA	Production, writing
2026	Moses Sumney	“Don’t Leave Me Be”, “Sins Of The Father”, “Bang! Bang! Bang!”	Is God Is (Original Motion Picture Soundtrack)	Soundtrack Records	mixing
2026	Doug Aitken	all songs	“Lightscape”	The Vinyl Factory	co-production
2025	Burna Boy	“Change Your Mind feat Shaboozey”	No Sign Of Weakness	Atlantic	Production, writing
2025	G-Eazy	-	“HELIUM”	RCA	Production, writing, mixing
2025	Dora Jar	“Lucky”	single	Island	Production
2025	Guitarricadelafuente	“Tramuntana”	“Spanish Leather”	Sony	Production, writing
2025	Youth Lagoon	all songs	Rarely Do I Dream	Fat Possom	Production, mixing
2025	Adam Melchor	“Lightweight”	“The Diary Of Living”	self released	Production, mixing
2024	Jamie xx	"Treat Each Other Right", "Dafodil", "The Feeling I Get From You", "Falling Together", "F.U. feat Erykah Badu", "Waited All Night"	In Waves	Young	Production, writing, mixing
2024	Mustafa	-	"Dunya"	Jagjaguwar	Production, writing, mixing
2024	Asap Ferg	all songs	"Darold"	RCA	Production, executive production
2024	ZAYN	"False Starts"	Room Under The Stairs	Mercury	Production, writing
2024	Sam Austins	"Seasons"	single	self released	Production, writing
2024	Orion Sun	all songs	"Orion"	Mom+Pop	Production, mixing
2024	Ben Böhmer	‘Hiding' feat Lykke Li	“Breathing”	Ninja Tune	writing
2023	Dermot Kennedy	"Sunday"	-	Interscope	Production, writing
2023	Mustafa	"Name of God"	-	Regent Park Songs	Production, mixing
2023	Mayer Hawthorne	all songs	"For All Time"	P&L Records	Production, arranging
2023	Beck	"Thinking About You"	-	Universal	Mixing
2023	Don Toliver	"Leather Coat"	Lovesick	Atlantic	Production, writing
2023	Youth Lagoon	all songs	Heaven Is a Junkyard	Fat Possum	Production
2023	Paris Texas	"Everybody's Safe Until…", "Lana Del Rey"	Mid Air	self released	Production, writing
2023	IDK	"Thug Tear", "Rabbit Stew"	F65	Warner	Production
2023	Glaive	"Oh Are You Bipolar One or Two?"	I Care So Much That I Don't Care At All	Interscope	Production, writing
2022	Weyes Blood	"A Given Thing"	And In The Darkness, Hearts Aglow	Sub Pop	Production
2022	Omar Apollo	"Ivory"	Ivory	Warner	Production
2022	Jamie xx	"Let’s Do It Again"	single	Young	Mixing
2022	Lykke Li	"Happy Hurts", "5D", "Highway To Your Heart"	Eyeye	PIAS	Production, writing
2021	Mustafa	"Ali"	When Smoke Rises	Regent Park Songs	Production
2021	Parquet Courts	-	Sympathy for Life	Rough Trade	Production, mixing
2020	Alaska Reid	"Oblivion", "Pilot"	Big Bunny	Terrible Records	Production, writing
2020	Duval Timothy	all songs	Help	Carrying Colour	Production, mixing
2019	Hot Chip	-	A Bath Full Of Ecstasy	Domino	Production
2019	Kelsey Lu	-	Blood	Columbia	Production, writing
2019	Yellow Days	"How Can I Love You?"	single	Sony Records	Production
2018	David Byrne	all songs	American Utopia	Nonesuch	Production
2017	Nick Mulvey	"Mountain To Move"	Wake Up Now	Fiction	Production
2017	The xx	all songs	I See You	Young Turks	Production
2017	Sampha	all songs	Process	Young Turks	Production
2017	HMLTD	"To The Door"	single	Ouroboros LTD	Production
2016	Sampha	"Timmy's Prayer", "Blood On Me"	singles	Young Turks	Production
2016	Kanye West	"Saint Pablo"	The Life of Pablo	Def Jam	Sampha vocal production
2016	Liss	"Try", "Sorry"	Try EP	XL Recordings	Production
2016	Låpsley	"Love Is Blind", "Leap", "Operator (He Doesn’t Call Me)", "Cliff", "Hurt Me", "Heartless"	Long Way Home	XL Recordings	Production, writing
2016	The xx	"On Hold"	single	Young Turks	Production
2016	JONES	"Lonely Cry"	New Skin	37 Adventures	Production
2015	Låpsley	all songs	Understudy EP	XL Recordings	Production, writing
2015	Ardyn	"Universe" "Help Me On My Way"	Universe EP	National Anthem	Production
2014	How To Dress Well	all songs	"What Is This Heart?"	Domino	Production
2014	FKA Twigs	"How's That", "Water Me"	EP2	Young Turks	Mixing
2013	King Krule	all songs	6 Feet Beneath the Moon	XL Recordings, True Panther Sounds	Production
2013	Savages	all songs	Silence Yourself	Matador	Production
2013	Daughter	"Winter", "Smother", "Amsterdam", "Touch"	If You Leave	4AD	Production
2013	Willis Earl Beal	all songs	Nobody Knows.	XL Recordings	Production
2012	How To Dress Well	all songs	Total Loss	Domino	Production
2012	The xx	all songs	Coexist	Young Turks	Mixing
2012	Daughter	"Smother"	single	4AD	Mixing
2011	King Krule	All songs	King Krule EP	True Panther Sounds	Production
2011	The Horrors	"Whole New Way"	single	XL Recordings	Mixing
2011	DRC Music	"Ah Congo"	Kinshasa One Two	Warp Records	Production
2011	Spector	"Never Fade Away"	Enjoy It While It Lasts	Fiction	Production
2010	Adele	"If It Hadn’t Been For Love", "Hiding My Heart"	21	XL Recordings	Production
2010	Vampire Weekend	"Giving Up The Gun (Extended Mix)"	single	XL Recordings	Additional production
2010	Giggs	"Talkin da Hardest"	Let Em Ave It	XL Recordings, Takeover Entertainment	Mixing
2010	The xx	all songs	xx	Young Turks	Recording, mixing
2010	Gil Scott Heron	"I'm New Here", "Me and the Devil"	I'm New Here	XL Recordings	Recording, mixing

== Soundtracks ==
Year	Film	Director	Credit
2018	Two for Joy	Tom Beard	Composer
