= I Dare You (The xx song) =

Single by the xx

from the album I See You
- Released: 2 May 2017
- Length: 3:53
- Label: Young Turks
- Songwriter(s): Romy Madley Croft; Oliver Sim; Jamie Smith
- Producer(s): Jamie xx; Rodaidh McDonald

The xx singles chronology
"Say Something Loving" (2017)	"I Dare You" (2017)	"Dangerous" (2017)

Music video
- "I Dare You" on YouTube

"I Dare You" is a song by English indie pop band the xx, released on 2 May 2017 by Young Turks. It was the third single from their third studio album, I See You (2017). The song was written by guitarist Romy Madley Croft, bassist Oliver Sim and percussionist Jamie xx, and produced by Jamie xx and Rodaidh McDonald.

== Critical reception ==
Alexis Petridis of The Guardian described it as an "uncharacteristically sunlit" song that "Shawn Mendes or Zara Larsson could conceivably cover, rather than just nick the sound of". Entertainment Weekly's Nolan Feeney called it "a warm, uptempo ode to all-consuming infatuation".

== Live performances ==
The xx performed "I Dare You" for the first time during the 19 November 2016 episode of Saturday Night Live, along with "On Hold", the album's lead single. The band subsequently performed the song on The Late Show with Stephen Colbert on 18 May 2017.

== Music video ==
The accompanying music video for "I Dare You" premiered on 29 June 2017. The band was shot and directed by photographer and filmmaker Alasdair McLellan, who had previously worked on "On Hold" (2016) and "Say Something Loving" (2017). He collaborated with Raf Simons, chief creative officer of fashion house Calvin Klein, on the creative concept and direction. The video stars Millie Bobby Brown, Ernesto Cervantes, Paris Jackson, Ashton Sanders and Lulu Tenney, also featuring band members Romy Madley Croft, Oliver Sim and Jamie xx.

The band tweeted that the video is "[o]ur love letter to Los Angeles, a city close to our hearts, where we wrote and recorded parts of our album 'I See You'." It was shot in Los Angeles at Lloyd Wright's John Sowden House in Los Feliz and John Lautner's Garcia House (also known as The Rainbow House) on Mulholland Drive. According to Billboard's Sam Reed, the video "has a vintage Americana feel to it – the camera work even mimics the fuzzy look of an '80s-era VHS tape, bringing to mind a suburban-set John Hughes film".

== Charts ==
Chart (2017)	Peak position
Belgium (Ultratip Bubbling Under Flanders)	5
France (SNEP)	142
Portugal (AFP)	60
UK Singles (OCC)	100
UK Indie (OCC)	11
US Hot Rock & Alternative Songs (Billboard)	23
