= Heaven Is a Junkyard =

2023 studio album by Youth Lagoon

Studio album by Youth Lagoon
- Released: June 9, 2023
- Length: 34:33
- Label: Fat Possum
- Producers: Rodaidh McDonald; Trevor Powers

Youth Lagoon chronology
Savage Hills Ballroom (2015)	Heaven Is a Junkyard (2023)	Rarely Do I Dream (2025)

Trevor Powers chronology
Capricorn (2020)	Heaven Is a Junkyard (2023)	Rarely Do I Dream (2025)

Singles from Heaven Is a Junkyard
- 1. "Idaho Alien" Released: February 28, 2023; 2. "Prizefighter" Released: April 4, 2023; 3. "The Sling" Released: May 9, 2023

Heaven Is a Junkyard is the fourth studio album by Boise, Idaho-based musician Trevor Powers' Youth Lagoon project. It was released on June 9, 2023, by Fat Possum Records. It marks Trevor Powers' return to the moniker after announcing the end of Youth Lagoon in 2016. It is his first album since recording two albums under his own name — 2018's Mulberry Violence and 2020's Capricorn.

Produced by Powers and Rodaidh McDonald, Heaven Is a Junkyard was written by Powers in his home state of Idaho. Following a reaction to an over-the-counter medication, Powers lost his voice for months and wrote the album during a slow healing process. The album's lyrics explore themes of love, drugs, home, and miracles. Combining piano and electronics, the album has been described as "mutant Americana" and is a blend of country, spiritualism, experimental music, and ambient elements. The album was supported with the release of three singles: "Idaho Alien", "Prizefighter" and "The Sling".

== Background ==
Trevor Powers retired the Youth Lagoon project in February 2016 and released two experimental albums under his own name, Mulberry Violence (2018) and Capricorn (2020). In October 2021, Powers experienced a severe reaction to an over-the-counter medication that turned his digestive system upside down and turned his stomach into a "non-stop geyser of acid" coating his larynx and pharynx for eight months. It resulted in him losing 30 pounds and eventually losing the ability to speak, communicating only with a pen and paper. The growth that followed narrowed Powers' focus. Rather than writing about the world at large, he began writing about life in his home state of Idaho. According to Powers, the album is "about all of us. It's stories of brothers leaving for war, drunk fathers learning to hug, mothers falling in love, neighbors stealing mail, cowboys doing drugs, friends skipping school, me crying in the bathtub, dogs catching rabbits, and children playing in tall grass." While healing, his voice would return for brief moments before going away again, forcing Powers to record demos in many segments. In the meantime, he was mapping the songs out on piano. The songs were written almost entirely within the span of 8–12 months. Powers produced the album alongside the Scottish music producer Rodaidh McDonald. It was recorded over the span of six weeks, primarily in Los Angeles at McDonald's home studio.

In the liner notes, Powers dedicates the album to "my brother" Cormac Roth, calling him a "messenger of love, compassion, curiosity, and light — I'll see you in the junkyard." Roth had opened for Powers in 2018 upon the release of Mulberry Violence and the two became friends. "Prizefighter" is a direct homage to Roth, who died after battling cancer in 2022. The song employs war and boxing imagery to reflect grappling with mortality.

== Music and lyrics ==
Throughout the album, Powers stitches together a lyrical style that feels both punk and western. His lyrics explore themes of love, drugs, home, and miracles. Heaven Is a Junkyard has been referred to as a "portrait of the God-haunted American West." The album features extensive use of country elements, such as lap-steel, bass harmonica, and saloon-style upright piano, coupled with household objects such as baby monitors and TV static. Centering around Powers' voice and piano, the album includes the flourishes of electronics and synths that the Youth Lagoon project had become synonymous with. The album has been described as "mutant Americana" and is a blend of country, spiritualism, experimental music, and ambient elements.

"Idaho Alien" describes a father-son relationship and references despair through drug use and the indirect suggestion of suicide ("I dont remember how it happened / Blood filled up the clawfoot bath and / I will fear no frontier"). The song's chorus was informed by Powers' intense struggle with his body feeling like a prison at the time. In an interview with NPR's Rachel Martin, Powers said, "I was struggling with not killing myself and I turned to that song as a way to exorcise some of those demons."

== Release ==
In November 2022, Powers announced on his Instagram that a new Youth Lagoon album was forthcoming. The album was officially announced on February 28, 2023, alongside the single "Idaho Alien". A second single, "Prizefighter", was released on April 4, 2023. A North American tour was announced the same day, beginning in Spokane in mid-July and continuing through to October. The third single, "The Sling", was released on May 9, 2023. Each single was accompanied by a music video directed by Tyler T. Williams. Heaven Is a Junkyard was released on June 9, 2023, on Fat Possum Records.

== Critical reception ==
Professional ratings
Aggregate scores
Source	Rating
AnyDecentMusic?	7.8/10
Metacritic	83/100
Review scores
Source	Rating
AllMusic	3/5 stars
Beats Per Minute	84%
Exclaim!	8/10
Pitchfork	8.3/10
PopMatters	8/10
Sputnikmusic	4.2/5
Uncut	9/10

According to the review aggregator Metacritic, Heaven Is a Junkyard received "universal acclaim" based on a weighted average score of 83 out of 100 from 8 critic scores.

Pitchfork awarded the album its Best New Music distinction, with reviewer Marc Hogan writing, "Trevor Powers has long shown a penchant for reinvention, but his first album as Youth Lagoon in eight years feels like a homecoming; he's never sounded so confident or at peace with himself." Kyle Kohner of Exclaim! wrote, "Heaven Is a Junkyard will make you feel its spiritual tone and tenor, a superpower that has laid dormant with Youth Lagoon — Powers has found his voice again." Sputnikmusic gave it a score of 4.2/5, and wrote, "Heaven Is a Junkyard might be a comparatively trim release, but it contains multitudes." John Amen of Beats Per Minute wrote, "Heaven Is a Junkyard ... is Powers' most hook-oriented and arresting set, the Idaho-based artist basking in newfound confidence despite his clear awareness that so much of life remains uncontrollable." Amen concluded by calling the album "one of 2023's more hypnotic sequences."

Additionally, Billboard included "Rabbit" on their "10 Cool New Pop Songs to Get You Through the Week" list, detailing the track as "float[ing] in the wind with piano sprinkles and Powers' tender voice, then surg[ing] toward a propulsive finale that's barely perceptible before it arrives — the mark of an effective storyteller, confident in their craft."

=== Year-end lists ===
Select year-end rankings of Heaven Is a Junkyard
Publication/critic	Accolade	Rank	Ref.
Beats Per Minute	Top 50 Albums of 2023	5	
Paste	The 50 Best Albums of 2023	30	
Pitchfork	The 50 Best Albums of 2023	42	
The Ringer	The 27 Best Albums of 2023	22	

== Track listing ==
All tracks are written by Trevor Powers.

Heaven Is a Junkyard track listing
No.	Title	Length
1.	"Rabbit"	3:36
2.	"Idaho Alien"	3:23
3.	"Prizefighter"	2:41
4.	"The Sling"	3:33
5.	"Lux Radio Theatre"	2:44
6.	"Deep Red Sea"	3:24
7.	"Trapeze Artist"	3:30
8.	"Mercury"	4:13
9.	"Little Devil from the Country"	2:41
10.	"Helicopter Toy"	4:48
Total length:		34:33

== Personnel ==
- Trevor Powers – piano, programming, vocals, synthesizer, percussion, production
- Rodaidh McDonald – guitar ("Helicopter Toy"), production, engineering, mixing
- Dorothy Pox – acoustic guitar
- Gabe Noel – bass, bass harmonica, lap steel, string arrangement ("Helicopter Toy"), string performance ("Helicopter Toy")
- Sam KS – drums
- Stella Saint – horns
- Lonnie Saint – horns
- Rob Moose – string arrangement ("The Sling"), string performance ("The Sling")
- Everyday People's Choir – background vocals ("Trapeze Artist")
  - Chris Robbins
  - Brontë Jane
  - Scotty Cantino
  - Jess Isaac
  - Ben Jones
  - Gabriel De Rosa
  - Jayme Satery
- Erica Ransbottom – cello ("Mercury")
- Darren Stanley – drums ("Mercury")
- Tyler T. Williams – photographs
- Collin Fletcher – graphic design
- Jason Kingsland – co-production ("Mercury" and "Little Devil from the Country")
- Tim Friesen – co-production ("Mercury" and "Little Devil from the Country")
- Heba Kadry – mastering

== Charts ==
Chart performance for Heaven Is a Junkyard
Chart (2023)	Peak position
US Top Album Sales (Billboard)	75
US Top Current Album Sales (Billboard)	45
