= Love Remains =

Love Remains may refer to:

- "Love Remains" (song), by Collin Raye written by Tom Douglas and Jim Daddario 1996
- Love Remains (Bobby Watson album), 1988
- Love Remains (Hillary Scott album), 2016
- Love Remains (How to Dress Well album), 2010
- Love Remains, 2019 album by Tal Wilkenfeld
- Love Remains, novel by Glen Duncan 2000
