= Just Once (EP) =

EP by How to Dress Well
- Released: July 12, 2011
- Studios: Different Fur Studios (San Francisco, California)
- Genre: Chamber
- Length: 16:32
- Label: Yours Truly
- Producer: Nic Atamaniuk

Singles from Just Once
- 1. "Suicide Dream 3" Released: June 20, 2011

Just Once is an extended play by American singer-songwriter Tom Krell, known by his stage name as How to Dress Well. It was released on July 12, 2011, by the label Yours Truly, and is dedicated to Krell's friend Ryan Douglas Hitchon, who died in August 2010. The extended play consists of three string quartet-driven chamber renditions of songs from How to Dress Well's debut album Love Remains (2010), as well as another track, "Suicide Dream 3". Just Once was written by Krell, and recorded and mixed by Nic Atamaniuk. It garnered generally positive reviews from music journalists upon its July 2011 distribution, some of the major praises and criticisms going towards its departure from the reverb-and-distortion-heavy sound of Love Remains for a cleaner sound.

== Composition and production ==
Just Once is dedicated to Krell's friend Ryan Douglas Hitchon, who died in August 2010. Three out of the four tracks on Just Once, "Suicide Dream 1", "Suicide Dream 2" and "Decisions", are string quartet-driven chamber renditions of the more ambient cuts on How to Dress Well's debut studio album Love Remains (2010). These are tracks that Krell thought of as orchestral songs when he made them in the first place. It was when he was creating "Suicide Dream 3" that he conceived making a record in memory of Hitchon that contained orchestral arrangements of the three songs that he envisioned as orchestral pieces.

Krell's vocals are played at a high volume on the mix, and is devoid of any effects except for a little bit of reverb. This is a departure from the digital impulse noise-filled sound that was on Love Remains, where his voice was filtered with a heavy amount of reverb and distortion. Despite the orchestral instruments and a clean sound, some critics noted Just Once to still have a "crude" and "homemade" feel as Love Remains did, as well as maintaining the same harmony arrangement style as the full-length album. One critic from Beats per Minute described the tracks as "delicately arranged" for them to be "aggressively homemade", an example of this fact being a certain point in the EP where Krell pressing a button to stop recording can be heard. The 405 said that Krell's emotional falsetto mixture of joy and sadness "betrays the sense of looking back with a smile."

== Songs ==
"Suicide Dream 1" opens with an a cappella part before the strings that build up and what Beats per Minute describes as a "pastoral" piano play. Krell then sings a solo part in the track as the instrumental atmosphere "writhes" as Beats per Minute analyzed. Beginning with a sustained violin, "Suicide Dream 2" then has a "beautiful wash of piano" that "slowly wraps tendrils around the track", wrote Beats per Minute. Halfway into the length of the track, the publication analyzed that "everything sort of drops away to let singular notes peel off into the expanse while Krell's yearning half-lidded whispers waver around the space." "Suicide Dream 3" is the EP's only cut to not be a version of a song on Love Remains, and is the most filled with string riffs out of all of the four tracks. Just Once closes with "Decisions", which Pitchfork Media analysized to be a combination of "fuzzy, abstracted versions of about five different emotions". The track goes into a waltz-time signature every fourth bar. The song is also the only one on the record to have percussion, consisting of claps and a kick drum.

== Release ==
A track released before the EP came out was "Suicide Dream 3", which was issued on June 20, 2011. The song's official video also served as a documentation of the recording of Just Once. Just Once was released for digital download by the label Yours Truly on July 12, 2011. The 10-inch vinyl record was a limited edition of 1,000 copies, and money from sales of the vinyl were donated to mental health website MindFreedom.org.

== Critical reception ==
Professional ratings
Aggregate scores
Source	Rating
Metacritic	78/100
Review scores
Source	Rating
The 405	7.5/10
The A.V. Club	B-
Beats per Minute	80%
Coke Machine Glow	66%
Consequence of Sound	4/5 stars
Fact	3.5/5
Pitchfork Media	7.8/10

Reviews of Just Once from music journalists were generally positive. Consequence of Sound wrote that "Giving the Just Once EP a listen should quell any doubts regarding his versatility, because it's almost like hearing How to Dress Well again for the first time." Beats per Minute praised that there were much less filters on Krell's vocals on the EP than on Love Remains, which better showcased his singing ability. Fact magazine's Tam Gunn gave a similar praise, writing that "Krell's voice is more exposed than ever, and he excels under this pressure to an astonishing degree." He also called "Suicide Dream 3" one of the best How to Dress Well tracks ever made, describing it as "staggering: a chalk-coloured lament that’s flattening and addictive in equal measures". The 405 wrote that "the song craft on show here throughout ensures that each of the tracks have enough about them to stand up as pretty great songs in their own right and not just as a disposable one-off listen for when you’re feeling down."

A review by The A.V. Club writer Evan Rytlewski felt Krell's voice was better off hiding in many effects, writing that "He wails in a gaunt falsetto that's continually stretched just past its range, and the effect is something like Flaming Lips’ Wayne Coyne singing Prince in the shower." The review was still positive; Rytlewski wrote that the tracks "reveal how harmonically rich those Love Remains songs were under all their static" and that "it's a marvel, in retrospect, how Krell condensed such oversized melodies into such scruffy recordings." Coke Machine Glow summarized the record's move from Love Remains towards a more quality recording style as an "interesting but ultimately disappointing experiment", writing that all of the tracks "lack something abstract but necessary". Pitchfork described it as "a potential argument that How to Dress Well is best in short four- or five-song bursts, the way the first few EPs arrived-- you get the feeling Krell's songs evoke for 18 or 20 minutes, and then you move on."

== Track listing ==
All tracks written by Tom Krell, arranged by Minna Choi, recorded and mixed by Nic Atamaniuk at Different Fur Studios and mastered by Pete Swanson.

Standard version
No.	Title	Length
1.	"Suicide Dream 1"	3:46
2.	"Suicide Dream 2"	4:42
3.	"Suicide Dream 3"	5:08
4.	"Decisions"	2:56
Total length:		16:32
