= Through Water =

Studio album by Låpsley
- Released: 20 March 2020
- Length: 34:20
- Label: XL
- Producer: Theo Brown; Holly Lapsley Fletcher; David Kennedy; George Moore; Peter O'Grady; Ed Thomas; Eg White; Max Wolfgang

Låpsley chronology
These Elements (2019)	Through Water (2020)	Cautionary Tales of Youth (2023)

Singles from Through Water
- 1. "My Love Was Like The Rain" Released: 22 October 2019; 2. "Ligne 3" Released: 2 December 2019; 3. "Womxn" Released: 4 February 2020; 4. "Speaking of the End" Released: 16 March 2020

Professional ratings
Aggregate scores
Source	Rating
AnyDecentMusic?	7.5/10
Metacritic	79/100
Review scores
Source	Rating
AllMusic	3.5/5 stars
DIY	4.5/5 stars
The Guardian	4/5 stars
The Line of Best Fit	8/10

Through Water is the second studio album by English musician and producer Låpsley. It was released on 20 March 2020 under XL Recordings.

== Critical reception ==
Through Water was met with generally favourable reviews from critics. At Metacritic, which assigns a weighted average rating out of 100 to reviews from mainstream publications, this release received an average score of 79, based on 7 reviews.

== Track listing ==
Through Water – Standard edition
No.	Title	Writer(s)	Producer(s)	Length
1.	"Through Water"	Holly Lapsley Fletcher; Theo Brown	Fletcher; Brown	3:02
2.	"My Love Was Like the Rain"	Fletcher; Brown	Fletcher; Brown	4:12
3.	"First"	Fletcher; Max Wolfgang	Fletcher; David Kennedy; Wolfgang; Peter O'Grady	3:20
4.	"Ligne 3"	Fletcher; George Moore	Fletcher; Moore	4:01
5.	"Our Love Is a Garden"	Fletcher; Ed Thomas	Fletcher; Thomas; O'Grady	3:23
6.	"Leeds Liverpool Canal"	Fletcher; Brown	Fletcher; Brown	1:46
7.	"Sadness Is a Shade of Blue"	Fletcher; Brown	Fletcher; Brown	3:37
8.	"Womxn"	Fletcher; Brown	Fletcher; O'Grady	3:54
9.	"Bonfire"	Fletcher	Fletcher; O'Grady	3:55
10.	"Speaking of the End"	Fletcher; Eg White	Fletcher; White	3:10
Total length:				34:20

Through Water – Japanese edition bonus track
No.	Title	Length
11.	"Online"

== Personnel ==
Credits adapted from the album's liner notes and Tidal.

- Låpsley – lead vocals, programming, liner notes
- Lexxx – mixing
- Matt Colton – mastering
- Theo Brown – programming (1, 2, 6, 7)
- Max Wolfgang – programming (3)
- Peter O'Grady – programming (3, 5, 8, 9)
- George Moore – programming (4)
- Ed Thomas – programming (5)
- Eg White – programming (10)

== Charts ==
Chart performance for Through Water
Chart (2020)	Peak position
Belgian Albums (Ultratop Flanders)	193
