= Capricorn (Trevor Powers album) =

Studio album by Trevor Powers
- Released: July 29, 2020
- Genre: Electronic; ambient; experimental; neoclassical
- Length: 29:02
- Label: Fat Possum
- Producer: Trevor Powers

Trevor Powers chronology
Mulberry Violence (2018)	Capricorn (2020)

Professional ratings
Review scores
Source	Rating
Clash	8/10
Pitchfork	7.6/10

Capricorn is the second studio album released by American musician Trevor Powers under his own name, after previously releasing three studio albums under the name Youth Lagoon. It was released on July 29, 2020 via Bandcamp, including a limited edition run of cassette tapes and book, before being released digitally everywhere on July 31, 2020, via Fat Possum Records.

All songs were written and produced by Trevor Powers, mixing by Jason Kingsland, with art direction and design handled by Los Angeles–based designer Collin Fletcher. The album art sigil was designed by graphic designer Baptiste Bernazeau.

== Background ==
On July 29, 2020, Powers surprise-released his second album under his own name, titled Capricorn. It was recorded in a cabin near the Sawtooth Mountains in Idaho. “From the minute we wake up, we’re in a trance,” Powers said of the album. “This is music for our digital coma.”

Powers also released a short film to accompany the album, also titled Capricorn, on September 23, 2020. Co-directed by the album designer, Collin Fletcher, and Jamie Parkhurst, the film is set in a world "plagued by pollution and developmental decay" and is meant to depict a new generation that has grown up acclimated to a bleak environment, accompanied by the 29 minutes of Capricorn.

== Track listing ==
All tracks are written by Trevor Powers.

No.	Title	Length
1.	"First Rain"	3:36
2.	"Earth to Earth"	4:30
3.	"The Riverine"	3:53
4.	"A New Name"	3:29
5.	"Ghosts of Shanghai"	3:15
6.	"Blue Savior"	3:08
7.	"Pest"	3:14
8.	"2166"	3:57
Total length:		29:02
