= The Year of Hibernation =

Studio album by Youth Lagoon
- Released: September 27, 2011
- Recorded: Late 2010 - early 2011
- Studios: Kung Pow! Studio, Boise, Idaho
- Genres: Dream pop; lo-fi; neo-psychedelia
- Length: 42:20
- Label: Fat Possum
- Producers: Trevor Powers, Jeremy Park

Youth Lagoon chronology
The Year of Hibernation (2011)	Wondrous Bughouse (2013)

Singles from The Year of Hibernation
- 1. "July" Released: May 2011; 2. "Cannons" Released: May 2011

The Year of Hibernation is the debut album of American artist Youth Lagoon, the stage name of musician Trevor Powers. The album was released on September 27, 2011, on the independent record label Fat Possum Records. It peaked at No. 41 on the Independent Albums and No. 8 on the Top Heatseekers charts of Billboard. While no official singles were released, two of the songs were made available on Bandcamp prior to the album's release and two videos were made in support of the album.

== Background ==
The album was written and recorded during a difficult period in the life of Powers, who was receiving counseling for anxiety which was causing him to develop panic attacks and a debilitating fear of death. This anxiety is referenced throughout the album and is a major theme along with fear, interpersonal conflicts, tension and heartache.

To enable him to save up enough money to record the album with local engineer and friend Jeremy Park, he busked with his keyboard late at night in downtown Boise. He also ceased his counseling sessions, which had a negative effect on his relationship with his girlfriend.

The album was recorded at Park's Kung Pow! home studio in Boise during Powers' Christmas break from Boise State University. In an effort to capture a "band" feel, the initial recording sessions were made using Pro Tools, with Powers playing keyboards (including a Yamaha full-size electric piano), operating an Alesis SR16 drum machine and singing, while accompanied by Erik Eastman on a Gibson SG guitar. As the album was recorded in a home studio, various rooms were used to enable certain sounds to be generated. Park's in-laws' large garage and shower room were used as reverb chambers, a bass amp was recorded in a master bedroom closet and the main vocals were recorded in Park's living room to enable different mic distances to be used. The organ sounds in "July" were generated by recording Powers playing from both the kitchen and the living room, which generated a "spacious and ambient sound".

Once the album was complete, Powers planned to release it online to garner interest, with the intention of distributing the full album for free online. Powers issued two initial tracks, "Cannons" and "July", on Bandcamp in May 2011, gaining interest from a series of music blogs, including a "Best New Tracks" designation from Pitchfork. This resulted in Powers being picked up by record label Fat Possum for a two-album deal.

=== Album artwork and title ===
The name of the album is a reference to Powers' feelings of hibernation through the process of writing the album. While writing the album, Powers' anxiety increased, causing him to retreat to his bedroom to compose in an effort to deal with events in his past. When the album was finished, and his mental state had changed, he felt that his "year of hibernation" was complete.

The album artwork was originally going to feature a picture of Powers as a child, but this changed following a family vacation with his parents and brothers. The artwork for the album consists of an unedited photo taken by Powers on the Hawaiian island of Kauai during the trip. The holiday was significant to Powers as “everyone was growing up and moving out, and it was the last family vacation". The Seattle Times described the picture as "a glowing scene captured by a suburban, middle-class kid in love with the moment, wanting to hold it forever".

== Promotion and tour ==
Two music videos were released in support of the album, for tracks "July" and "Montana". Both videos were directed by Tyler T. Williams, a friend of Powers. The video for "Montana" follows "a man dealing with the death of his father who passed away in war when he was a kid", with Bryan Parker from Pop Press International describing it as: "one of the most strikingly cinematic and beautiful videos we’ve seen in recent memory". The video for July was described as "eerily sad" and "A bloody-nosed, apocalyptic affair" and drew comparisons to Lars Von Trier's Melancholia.

To promote the album, Youth Lagoon embarked on a 19-date American tour in November 2011. This tour was followed by a 34-date worldwide tour in early 2012 including performances in Japan and Europe as well as North America. Touring restarted in July, including dates at the Ottawa Bluesfest, Pitchfork Music Festival, Capitol Hill Block Party and Splendour in the Grass festivals. On tour, Powers played keyboards, and was joined on stage by friend Logan Hyde on guitars.

After a March 2012 performance at the SXSW festival, Bryan Parker from Pop Press International said of the live show: "When Youth Lagoon began, the crowd was engrossed from the first note. Though not as physically mobile on stage as SXSW headliners often are, Powers’ blatantly emotive delivery of his poetic lyrics captivated us with its rarity". In his review for Timeout Chicago, Dave Satterwhite was less complimentary, saying that the music was "somewhat dancey, somewhat psychedelic, but not quite anything when the set was over" and that the crowd were "asleep on their feet, waiting for that moment of finality, of happy abandon". Drew Litowitz of Consequence of Sound was much more positive in his review of Youth Lagoon's performance at the Rock and Roll Hotel, a Washington D.C. venue, describing Powers' voice as "exceptional" and the performance as "loud and penetrating, albeit minimal".

== Reception ==
Professional ratings
Aggregate scores
Source	Rating
AnyDecentMusic?	7.6/10
Metacritic	77/100
Review scores
Source	Rating
AllMusic	4/5 stars
The A.V. Club	B+
Clash	7/10
Consequence of Sound	3.5/5 stars
The Irish Times	4/5 stars
Mojo	3/5 stars
Pitchfork	8.4/10
Q	3/5 stars
Spin	8/10
Under the Radar	8/10

The album has received mostly positive reviews from critics. On review aggregator Metacritic, a website which assigns a normalized rating out of 100 from reviews by mainstream critics, it currently holds a rating of 77 out of 100, signifying "generally favorable" reviews.

In his Pitchfork review, Mark Richardson said, "The record mixes feelings of protection and safety with the tug of adventure and wraps it in compulsively listenable music that explodes at just the right moments," while Consequence of Sound called the album "charming", saying that it "serves as a whimsical introduction to the magic of Youth Lagoon". Under the Radar rated the album 8 out of 10, and summed it up by saying, "The Year of Hibernation occupies many spaces at once, a seeming contradiction that makes better use of its incongruous pieces than most records do of its complementary pieces. The result is both mournful and joyful, but totally enjoyable". In her review for AllMusic, Heather Phares described the single "Cannons" as "lovely" and said the album was made special by the "vulnerability and empathy that radiate from every song".

It was voted the 50th best album of 2011 by Pitchfork and 18th best album of 2011 by music blog Pretty Much Amazing, with Ian Cohen of Pitchfork saying, "Powers' debut LP made a real and lasting connection like few other records in the past 12 months". It was also given an honorable mention among 2011 albums by Relevant magazine and by music website Beats per Minute

== Track listing ==
All tracks are written by Trevor Powers.

No.	Title	Length
1.	"Posters"	3:51
2.	"Cannons"	3:44
3.	"Afternoon"	4:10
4.	"17"	3:56
5.	"July"	4:46
6.	"Daydream"	5:19
7.	"Montana"	4:34
8.	"The Hunt"	4:26
Total length:		34:49

Bonus tracks
No.	Title	Length
9.	"Bobby"	3:22
10.	"Ghost to Me"	4:08
11.	"Goodbye Again - Live on XMU"	3:40
Total length:		11:07

== Charts ==
Chart (2011)	Peak position
US Heatseekers Albums (Billboard)	8
US Independent Albums (Billboard)	41

== Personnel ==
- Eric Eastman - Guitar
- Joe LaPorta - Mastering
- Jeremy Park - Engineer, mixing, percussion, producer
- Trevor Powers - Composer, producer
- Trevor Schultz - Bass guitar
