= I See You (The xx album) =

2017 studio album by the xx

Studio album by the xx
- Released: 13 January 2017
- Recorded: March 2014 – August 2016
- Studios: Park Avenue Armory; XL (New York); Marfa Recording Co. (Marfa); Greenhouse (Reykjavík); Perfect Sound (Los Angeles); The Church; The Pool; The Square; Fortress; RAK (London)
- Genres: Indie rock; dream pop; alternative dance
- Length: 39:15
- Label: Young Turks
- Producers: Jamie Smith; Rodaidh McDonald

The xx chronology
Coexist (2012)	I See You (2017)

Alternative cover
- Cover art for digital versions

Singles from I See You
- 1. "On Hold" Released: 10 November 2016; 2. "Say Something Loving" Released: 1 January 2017; 3. "I Dare You" Released: 2 May 2017; 4. "Dangerous" Released: 2 October 2017

I See You is the third studio album by English indie pop band the xx. It was released on 13 January 2017 by the Young Turks record label. It was the band's first album in more than four years, following 2012's Coexist.

The xx began recording I See You in 2014 at Marfa Recording Co. in Marfa, Texas, and were assisted by producer Rodaidh McDonald. According to the band, they had a more progressive, wide-ranging musical concept in mind, compared to their previous two albums. Jamie xx, the band's multi-instrumentalist and producer, said the album's sound and aesthetic were influenced by his 2015 club-influenced solo recording, In Colour.

I See You was released to widespread critical acclaim, with many reviewers finding its music less insular than the xx's previous recordings. It became the band's second number-one album in the United Kingdom and an international top-ten chart success. Four singles were released to promote the album, beginning with "On Hold", while the xx embarked on the European I See You Tour and subsequent concerts in the Americas.

== Recording and production ==
The xx announced in May 2014 that they were working on their third studio album with producer Rodaidh McDonald at Marfa Recording Co., a recording studio in Marfa, Texas. According to Mixmag journalist Stephen Worthy, a "watershed" moment had occurred immediately before recording commenced when during a series of New York concerts, the trio—Romy Madley Croft, Oliver Sim, and Jamie Smith—"barely made eye contact with their audience. It was their way of saying goodbye to the old xx". While working on I See You, Croft enrolled in a songwriting course in California, Sim modelled for Christian Dior SE, and Smith released a solo album, 2015's In Colour.

Smith, the xx's producer and multi-instrumentalist, stated that In Colour "definitely informed what we're doing" for I See You, while the band said the record would have a "completely different concept" from their first two albums. They also said the album would sound "more outward-looking, open and expansive". I See You was described by AnyDecentMusic? as an album of indie rock and dream pop music, while Matt Hobbs from God is in the TV said the xx expanded on the dance portion of their usual fusion of indie and alternative dance sounds. According to Pitchfork's November 2016 update on the album, I See You was ultimately recorded between March 2014 and August 2016 at studios in Marfa, New York City, Los Angeles, London, and Reykjavík.

== Marketing and sales ==
The album's lead single, "On Hold", was released on 10 November 2016, premiering on the xx's YouTube account ahead of the album's release date being announced. On 19 November, the band performed as the musical guest on the American sketch comedy show Saturday Night Live. "Say Something Loving" was released as the second single on 1 January 2017.

I See You was released on 13 January 2017 by Young Turks. In its first week, it sold 26,513 copies in the United Kingdom and debuted at number one on the British albums chart, becoming the xx's second album to top the chart, after Coexist did in 2012. In the United States, I See You debuted at number two on the Billboard 200 and recorded 46,000 album-equivalent units; 36,000 of these were traditional album sales. In Japan, it entered the Oricon Albums Chart at number 34 and sold 2,073 copies in its first week there.

The xx supported the album with the I See You Tour, performing concerts throughout Europe in February and March 2017. This was followed by a series of music festival appearances in South America, including the Estéreo Picnic Festival in Bogotá and Lollapalooza dates in São Paulo, San Isidro, and Santiago. A North American tour began on 14 April at the Coachella Music Festival in Indio, California and concluded on 26 May in Portland, Maine.

== Critical reception ==
Professional ratings
Aggregate scores
Source	Rating
AnyDecentMusic?	7.8/10
Metacritic	85/100
Review scores
Source	Rating
AllMusic	4/5 stars
The A.V. Club	A−
Entertainment Weekly	A−
The Guardian	4/5 stars
The Independent	4/5 stars
NME	4/5 stars
Pitchfork	8.4/10
Q	4/5 stars
Rolling Stone	3.5/5 stars
Vice (Expert Witness)	B+

I See You was met with widespread critical acclaim. At Metacritic, which assigns a normalised rating out of 100 to reviews from mainstream publications, the album received an average score of 85, based on 35 reviews. According to Kitty Empire, it was hailed by critics as the xx's "least insular album thus far".

Writing for The Guardian, Alexis Petridis said the record "pulls off the feat of managing to sound both exactly like the xx and unlike anything they have done before". He believed the band's willingness to explore musical influences from Smith's In Colour album gave the tracks a "richer and fuller" quality than on their previous records. I See You was called "the most eclectic, multidimensional, and ambitious album of The xx’s young career" by Philip Cosores from The A.V. Club, while Entertainment Weekly's Nolan Feeney deemed it "the boldest work yet from a band famous for subtlety". In the opinion of Uncut reviewer Sam Richards, the band "expanded their horizons without sacrificing any of the emotional intimacy that makes them one of the most compelling acts around". Q critic Victoria Segal noted its shared lyrical themes with Coexist and echoes of the "club culture" from In Colour, while concluding that musically, the band were "extending past glories rather than copying them". "Sim's and Madley Croft's vocal melodies are sturdier and more shapely than in the past", Mikael Wood wrote in the Los Angeles Times, surmising it to be "a product perhaps of the time Madley Croft spent in L.A. between xx albums working on potential songs for pop stars."

Some critics were less enthusiastic. In Vice, Robert Christgau observed artistic growth and accessibility in songs such as "On Hold", "Say Something Loving", and "Brave for You"; but said, "however impressive their originality and skill, the details always end up getting away" throughout the album's "indistinct murmurs ... because in the end the band's shared aesthetic is so contained." Will Hodgkinson was more critical in The Times, writing that the album failed to "hit the highs of their previous work" while accusing the group of posturing, making note of Croft's "breathy emoting" on "Brave for You".

=== Accolades ===
I See You was nominated for IMPALA's European Album of the Year Award. It became the group's second album to be nominated for the Mercury Prize.

Publication	Accolade	Rank	Ref.
Billboard	Best Albums of 2017: Billboard's Top 50 Picks	14	
Diffuser	Diffuser's Top 25 Albums of 2017	19	
Digital Trends	The 50 Best Albums Released in 2017	29	
Double J	The 50 Best Albums of 2017	37	
Esquire UK	The 50 Best Albums of 2017	N/A	
Exclaim!	Exclaim!'s Top 20 Pop & Rock Albums of 2017	18	
Fopp	Fopp's Best Albums of 2017	2	
Highsnobiety	The 25 Best Albums of 2017	23	
The Independent	The 30 Best Albums of 2017	28	
Mixmag	The Top 50 Albums of 2017	19	
NME	NME's Albums of the Year 2017	46	
NME	NME's Greatest Albums of the 2010s	63	
No Ripcord	No Ripcord's Best Albums of 2017	12	
OOR	Album van het jaar	5	
Paste	The 50 Best Albums of 2017	28	
Pitchfork	The 50 Best Albums of 2017	40	
PopMatters	The 60 Best Albums of 2017	7	
Pretty Much Amazing	The Best Albums of 2017	7	
Q	Q Magazine's 50 Best Albums of 2017	17	
Radio X	The 30 Best New Albums of 2017	N/A	
Rolling Stone Australia	50 Best Albums of 2017	30	
Spectrum Culture	Top 20 Albums of 2017	10	
The Skinny	The Skinny's Top 50 Albums of 2017	36	
Time	The Top 10 Albums of 2017	8	
Uncut	Uncut's 75 Best Albums of 2017	50	
Uproxx	50 Best Albums of 2017	37	
Uproxx	100 Best Albums of the 2010s	83	

== Track listing ==
All lyrics written by Oliver Sim and Romy Madley Croft; all music composed by Jamie Smith, Sim, and Croft; all tracks produced by Smith and Rodaidh McDonald; unless otherwise noted.

Standard version
No.	Title	Length
1.	"Dangerous"	4:10
2.	"Say Something Loving" (additional production by Romy Madley Croft)	3:58
3.	"Lips"	3:20
4.	"A Violent Noise"	3:47
5.	"Performance" (lyrics by Croft)	4:06
6.	"Replica"	4:09
7.	"Brave for You" (lyrics by Croft)	4:13
8.	"On Hold"	3:44
9.	"I Dare You"	3:53
10.	"Test Me" (lyrics and additional production by Croft)	3:55
Total length:		39:15

Deluxe version bonus disc
No.	Title	Length
1.	"Naive"	3:36
2.	"Seasons Run" (lyrics by Oliver Sim)	4:22
3.	"Brave for You" (Marfa demo; lyrics by Croft)	2:36
Total length:		49:49

Sample credits

- "Say Something Loving" contains a sample of "Do You Feel It", performed by Alessi, and written by Bobby and Billy Alessi, and homage to "The Sweetest Taboo", performed by Sade, and written by Sade Adu and Martin Ditcham
- "Lips" contains a sample of "Just (After Song of Songs)", performed by Trio Mediæval, Garth Knox, Agnès Vesterman and Sylvain Lemêtre, and written by David Lang
- "On Hold" contains a sample of "I Can't Go for That (No Can Do)", performed by Daryl Hall & John Oates and written by Sara Allen, Daryl Hall and John Oates
- "Naive" contains a sample of "Doing It Wrong", performed by Drake, and written by Aubrey Graham, Adrian Eccleston, Don McLean and Noah Shebib

== Personnel ==
Credits adapted from the album's liner notes.

=== The xx ===
- Romy Madley Croft – guitar, vocals (all tracks); keyboards, additional production (tracks 2, 10); art direction, design
- Oliver Sim – bass, vocals, photography
- Jamie Smith – production, mixing, engineering, programming, synthesizers, drums, keyboards (all tracks); string arrangements (tracks 5, 12), violin (track 5), piano (tracks 6, 11), vocals (track 10), guitar (track 12)

=== Additional personnel ===
- Rodaidh McDonald – production, engineering
- David Wrench – additional programming, mixing
- Marta Salogni – engineering
- John Davis – mastering
- Stella Mozgawa – drums (tracks 2, 11)
- Hal Ritson – brass recording and engineering, additional programming, bass guitar (track 1)
- Neil Waters – trumpet (track 1)
- Ben Somers – saxophone (track 1)
- Iskra Strings – strings (tracks 5, 12)
- John Smart – violin (tracks 5, 12)
- Oli Langford – violin (tracks 5, 12)
- James Underwood – violin (tracks 5, 12)
- Eos Counsell – violin (tracks 5, 12)
- Emma Owens – viola (tracks 5, 12)
- Laurie Anderson – viola (tracks 5, 12)
- Peter Gregson – cello (tracks 5, 12)
- Charlotte Eksteen – cello (tracks 5, 12)
- Paul Frith – orchestration (track 5)
- Sam Thompson – orchestration (track 12)
- Phil Lee – art direction, design

== Charts ==
=== Weekly charts ===
Weekly chart performance for I See You
Chart (2017)	Peak position
Australian Albums (ARIA)	1
Austrian Albums (Ö3 Austria)	2
Belgian Albums (Ultratop Flanders)	1
Belgian Albums (Ultratop Wallonia)	2
Canadian Albums (Billboard)	2
Czech Albums (ČNS IFPI)	12
Danish Albums (Hitlisten)	3
Dutch Albums (Album Top 100)	1
Finnish Albums (Suomen virallinen lista)	8
French Albums (SNEP)	5
German Albums (Offizielle Top 100)	1
Greek Albums (IFPI)	8
Hungarian Albums (MAHASZ)	39
Irish Albums (IRMA)	1
Irish Independent Albums (IRMA)	1
Italian Albums (FIMI)	11
Japanese Albums (Oricon)	34
Japanese International Albums (Oricon)	8
Latvian Albums (LaIPA)	86
Mexican Albums (AMPROFON)	18
New Zealand Albums (RMNZ)	3
Norwegian Albums (VG-lista)	3
Polish Albums (ZPAV)	8
Portuguese Albums (AFP)	1
Scottish Albums (Official Charts)	1
Spanish Albums (Promusicae)	2
Swedish Albums (Sverigetopplistan)	4
Swiss Albums (Schweizer Hitparade)	2
UK Albums (Official Charts)	1
UK Independent Albums (Official Charts)	1
US Billboard 200	2
US Independent Albums (Billboard)	1
US Top Alternative Albums (Billboard)	1
US Top Rock Albums (Billboard)	1

=== Year-end charts ===
2017 year-end chart performance for I See You
Chart (2017)	Position
Australian Albums (ARIA)	94
Belgian Albums (Ultratop Flanders)	9
Belgian Albums (Ultratop Wallonia)	84
Dutch Albums (Album Top 100)	69
French Albums (SNEP)	173
Spanish Albums (PROMUSICAE)	85
Swiss Albums (Schweizer Hitparade)	82
UK Albums (OCC)	64
US Independent Albums (Billboard)	14
US Top Rock Albums (Billboard)	66

2018 year-end chart performance for I See You
Chart (2018)	Position
Belgian Albums (Ultratop Flanders)	130

== Certifications ==
Certifications for I See You
Region	Certification	Certified units/sales
New Zealand (RMNZ)	Gold	7,500^{‡}
United Kingdom (BPI)	Gold	100,000^{‡}
^{‡} Sales+streaming figures based on certification alone.
