= Wondrous Bughouse =

Studio album by Youth Lagoon
- Released: March 5, 2013
- Genre: Experimental; noise; psychedelia; psychedelic pop
- Length: 50:45
- Label: Fat Possum
- Producer: Trevor Powers; Ben H. Allen

Youth Lagoon chronology
The Year of Hibernation (2011)	Wondrous Bughouse (2013)	Savage Hills Ballroom (2015)

Singles from Wondrous Bughouse
- 1. "Dropla" Released: January 16, 2013; 2. "Mute" Released: February 11, 2013

Wondrous Bughouse is the second album by Youth Lagoon, the stage name of American musician Trevor Powers. The album was released on March 5, 2013 on the independent record label Fat Possum Records. It peaked at No. 76 on the Billboard 200, No. 12 on the Independent Albums chart and No. 26 on the Top Rock Albums chart.

== Composition ==
Wondrous Bughouse, Trevor Powers' sophomore record as Youth Lagoon, finds Powers collaborating alongside distinguished mixer/producer Ben H. Allen for the first time. Writing the music at home and recording demos on a tape recorder, Powers' lyrics explore themes of death, surrealism, human frailty, and the afterlife. Featuring extensive use of synthesizers, noise and ambient elements, and avant-garde piano and guitar effects, the album suggests a growing state of uneasiness and psychological dysphoria. Allen had produced with indie musicians before, previously lending his expertise to lauded records such as experimental pop quartet Animal Collective's influential Merriweather Post Pavilion (2009) and art rock quintet Deerhunter's Halcyon Digest (2010). Wondrous Bughouse was recorded in Atlanta, Georgia.

The album is the follow-up to Powers' debut for the Fat Possum record label, The Year of Hibernation, which was produced by Powers and his friend Jeremy Park in Park's own Nampa-based home studio Kung Pow! Studio. The final product would don a bedroom pop aesthetic that would "stand out from its lo-fi peers thanks to a sense of wide-eyed adventure."

With Bughouse, Powers' sonic palette would expand to yield "a dense tapestry of swirling overdubs and warped psychedelia," "much grander and more ambitious than its predecessor."

The "brilliantly grandiose" "Mute" is "a strongly psychedelic, deranged rainbow puke of a song," on which Powers' vocals "have never sounded so soaring and confident."

Third track "Attic Doctor" features a "calliope-like melody", recalling "the darker VHS carnvial sound of Ariel Pink."

== Critical reception ==
Professional ratings
Aggregate scores
Source	Rating
AnyDecentMusic?	7.4/10
Metacritic	74/100
Review scores
Source	Rating
AllMusic	3.5/5 stars
The A.V. Club	A−
Beats Per Minute	68%
Consequence of Sound	B
Drowned in Sound	8/10
Exclaim!	7/10
The Line of Best Fit	9/10
NME	3.5/5 stars
Pitchfork	8.7/10
Slant Magazine	2/5 stars

Wondrous Bughouse received positive reviews from most contemporary music critics. At Metacritic, which assigns a normalized rating out of 100 to reviews from mainstream critics, the album received an average score of 74, based on 24 reviews, which indicates "generally favorable reviews".

== Accolades ==
=== Tracks ===
Publication	Work	Accolade	Rank	Ref.
Pitchfork	"Mute"	The Top 100 Tracks of 2013	75	

== Track listing ==
All tracks are written by Trevor Powers.

No.	Title	Length
1.	"Through Mind and Back"	2:31
2.	"Mute"	5:58
3.	"Attic Doctor"	3:52
4.	"The Bath"	4:47
5.	"Pelican Man"	5:07
6.	"Dropla"	5:56
7.	"Sleep Paralysis"	5:34
8.	"Third Dystopia"	5:01
9.	"Raspberry Cane"	6:40
10.	"Daisyphobia"	5:19
Total length:		50:45

== Charts ==
Chart (2013)	Peak position
US Billboard 200	76
US Independent Albums (Billboard)	12
US Top Rock Albums (Billboard)	26
