= Total Loss (album) =

Studio album by How to Dress Well
- Released: October 2, 2012
- Genre: Alternative R&B; ambient
- Length: 42:15
- Label: Acéphale Records; Weird World
- Producer: How to Dress Well; Rodaidh McDonald; Forest Swords

How to Dress Well chronology
Love Remains (2010)	Total Loss (2012)	"What Is This Heart?" (2014)

Total Loss is the second studio album by American musician How to Dress Well. It was released in September 2012 on Acephale Records in North America and Weird World Records in other regions. The track "Cold Nites", which was co-written and co-produced by Forest Swords, was released as a single.

== Critical reception ==
Professional ratings
Aggregate scores
Source	Rating
AnyDecentMusic?	7.6/10
Metacritic	77/100
Review scores
Source	Rating
AllMusic	3.5/5 stars
Fact	4/5
The Guardian	4/5 stars
The Irish Times	4/5 stars
NME	8/10
Pitchfork	8.4/10
Q	3/5 stars
Slant Magazine	4/5 stars
Spin	7/10
Uncut	8/10

At Metacritic, which assigns a weighted average score out of 100 to reviews from mainstream critics, the album received an average score of 77% based on 25 reviews, indicating "generally favorable reviews".

It was listed 33rd on Stereogum's list of top 50 albums of 2012. Pitchfork placed it at number 28 on its list of the top 50 albums of 2012.

=== Accolades ===
Accolades for Total Loss
Publication	Accolade	Rank
Beats Per Minute	Top 50 Albums of 2012	8
Consequence of Sound	Top 50 Albums of 2012	29
Exclaim!	Top 50 Albums of 2012	36
Fact	Top 50 Albums of 2012	6
The Line of Best Fit	Top 50 Albums of 2012	15
Pitchfork	Top 50 Albums of 2012	28
Under the Radar	Top 100 Albums of 2012	22

== Track listing ==
Total Loss track listing
No.	Title	Length
1.	"When I Was in Trouble"	3:22
2.	"Cold Nites"	3:38
3.	"Say My Name or Say Whatever"	4:24
4.	"Running Back"	3:17
5.	"& It Was U"	3:04
6.	"World I Need You, Won't Be Without You (Proem)"	2:48
7.	"Struggle"	4:28
8.	"How Many?"	5:02
9.	"Talking to You"	4:14
10.	"Set It Right"	4:46
11.	"Ocean Floor for Everything"	3:12

Bonus 7"
No.	Title	Length
1.	"Again" (Janet Jackson cover)	4:25
2.	"Blue Crystal Fire" (Robbie Basho cover)	4:56
3.	"Set It Right" (a capella version)	4:25

== Charts ==
Chart performance for Total Loss
Chart (2012)	Peak position
Belgian Albums (Ultratop Flanders)	63
Belgian Albums (Ultratop Wallonia)	141
US Heatseekers Albums (Billboard)	35
US Top Dance Albums (Billboard)	18
