= Care (How to Dress Well album) =

Studio album by How to Dress Well
- Released: September 23, 2016
- Genre: Art pop
- Length: 58:41
- Label: Domino
- Producer: Tom Krell; Jack Antonoff; Dre Skull; CFCF; Kara-Lis Coverdale

How to Dress Well chronology
"What Is This Heart?" (2014)	Care (2016)	The Anteroom (2018)

Singles from Care
- 1. "Lost Youth/Lost You" Released: July 27, 2016; 2. "What's Up" Released: August 31, 2016; 3. "Can't You Tell" Released: September 19, 2016

Care is the fourth studio album by American musician How to Dress Well, released on September 23, 2016 by the Domino Recording Company.

== Release ==
The album was preceded by the singles "Lost Youth/Lost You", "What's Up", and "Can't You Tell".

== Critical reception ==
Professional ratings
Aggregate scores
Source	Rating
Metacritic	75/100
Review scores
Source	Rating
AllMusic	4/5 stars
Consequence of Sound	B
DIY	2/5 stars
Exclaim!	8/10
The Guardian	2/5 stars
Pitchfork Media	6.8/10
PopMatters	8/10 stars

Care received generally favorable reviews from contemporary music critics. At Metacritic, which assigns a normalized rating out of 100 to reviews from mainstream critics, the album received an average score of 75, based on 16 reviews, which indicates "generally favorable reviews".

== Track listing ==
All tracks are written by Tom Krell.

Care track listing
No.	Title	Length
1.	"Can't You Tell"	4:33
2.	"Salt Song"	6:35
3.	"What's Up"	4:39
4.	"Lost Youth/Lost You"	5:39
5.	"The Ruins"	5:00
6.	"Burning Up"	4:36
7.	"I Was Terrible"	5:29
8.	"Anxious"	4:30
9.	"Time Was Meant to Stay"	3:09
10.	"Made a Lifetime"	3:44
11.	"They'll Take Everything You Have"	5:58
12.	"Untitled"	4:49
Total length:		58:41

== Charts ==
Chart performance for Care
Chart (2016)	Peak position
French Albums (SNEP)	192
