= The Anteroom =

Studio album by How to Dress Well
- Released: October 19, 2018
- Recorded: 2016–2018
- Studio: Pat House, Los Angeles
- Genre: Experimental pop; electronic; R&B; ambient
- Length: 57:24
- Label: Domino
- Producer: Tom Krell; Joel Ford; Michael Silver; Ben Babbitt

How to Dress Well chronology
Care (2016)	The Anteroom (2018)	What Remains (Remixes) (2023)

Singles from The Anteroom
- 1. "Vacant Boat (shred) | Nonkilling 1 | The Anteroom | False Skull 1" Released: June 27, 2018; 2. "Nonkilling 6 | Hunger" Released: September 11, 2018; 3. "Body Fat" Released: October 15, 2018

Professional ratings
Aggregate scores
Source	Rating
Metacritic	74/100
Review scores
Source	Rating
AllMusic	4/5 stars
DIY	4/5 stars
Dork	3/5 stars
Drowned in Sound	4/10
The Line of Best Fit	7.5/10
MusicOMH	4/5 stars
Pitchfork	7.3/10

The Anteroom is the fifth studio album by American singer-songwriter Tom Krell, best known under his project name How to Dress Well, released on October 19, 2018 digitally and physically on Domino. The album was influenced by a spiritually intense period in Krell's life, as well as his renewed interest in experimental electronic music with abrasive and atmospheric textures that he had explored at the beginning of his career.

== Background and composition ==
Krell initially conceptualized The Anteroom when he relocated to Los Angeles after the United States 2016 election, and intended it as a "testament" to a two-year spiritually exploratory and intense period in his life that followed where he "felt [himself] slipping out of the world and into a cosmic loneliness in which [he] would eventually be dissolved". Prior to the album's release, Krell addressed that he was "no longer making music for the algorithm". With the album, he aimed to return to the experimental-, ambient- and noise-influenced sounds of his early work, but more cohesive and detailed; the press release subsequently described the album as a "single continuous piece of 21st century psychedelic music". Domino described the album as incorporating "blizzardous electronic noise, fragile melodies and poignant poetry", and compared the album to a weighted blanket. Krell also detailed the album's artistic and literary inspirations, citing:

Inspired by Coil (especially the "Moon Musick" phase), Robert Ashley, Kathy Acker, Helena Hauff, Neil Landstrumm, Front 242, Paul B. Preciado, "Acid Mt. Fuji," Dambudzo Marechera, Vatican Shadow, Joy Division's Unknown Pleasures, Alec Empire, Akira Rabelais, Frank Bidart, Basic Channel, Ocean Vuong, Silvia Federici, Maggie Nelson, Alejandra Pizarnik, demonic negative transcendence, the end of life on the earth: How to Dress Well presents The Anteroom.

Krell additionally published a Spotify playlist titled "The Anteroom Influences (LOTOU 1.1)" which documented the album's overall musical influences, as well as songs he listened to before and during the production of the album as reference points for its production style and emotional tone.

Artist and producer Joel Ford, who contributed production and engineering to The Anteroom, was described as a "facilitator" and a medium, and Krell admitted that his production on the album lead to Ford's interest and passion for music being renewed after a prior negative experience; Krell coped with "super mangled emotions" through Ford's presence in the studio. They also developed a technique known as "Incomplete Picture", an analogy for their gradually reductive production process and tendencies to engage in minimalism, creating "openness for the listening act".

== Concept and influences ==
The Anteroom is stylistically radically different from Krell's prior album under How to Dress Well, Care (2016), which was focused strictly on contemporary R&B and synthpop. In comparison, The Anteroom focuses mainly on experimental electronic music, ambient music and post-industrial music with abstracted pop songwriting, which was described as "bewitching sound experimentation". Prior to the album's release, Krell called it his "most sonically, biographically and conceptually detailed and intense record to date". He also admitted that he "got in such an intense space mentally", and that the album ended up becoming "this kind of big, exquisite corpse of itself". The album also lyrically addresses elements of Krell's own personal life, emphasized the most on "Nonkilling 6 | Hunger", "July 13 No Hope No Pain", and "Love Means Taking Action".

The album features literary and poetic references; the title track, "The Anteroom", lyrically references Maggie Nelson's Bluets multiple times, "Nonkilling 6 | Hunger" begins with a sample of a reading of Li-Young Lee's poem "The Cleaving", and "Brutal | False Skull 5" uses vocal samples of readings of poems by Ocean Vuong, Anne Sexton and Frank Bidart. Krell commented that "the way [he] write[s] is very free associative", and that he "had a canon of books [he] was reading; over and over, books of poetry that were essential"; he compared himself to a channel for such works.

=== Album art ===
The album cover of The Anteroom, different for the CD and vinyl editions, was created by Krell in collaboration with artist and friend Joshua Clancy. The deluxe vinyl edition in particular features art created in a "VR cave" on the Oculus Rift, which Krell and Clancy described as a "hyper-Lascaux at the end of the world".

== Track listing ==
All tracks are written by Tom Krell unless indicated, and co-produced by Joel Ford and Michael Silver.

The Anteroom track listing
No.	Title	Writer(s)	Length
1.	"Humans Disguised as Animals | Nonkilling 1"		4:50
2.	"Body Fat"		5:02
3.	"False Skull 7"		1:13
4.	"Nonkilling 3 | The Anteroom | False Skull 1"		6:42
5.	"Vacant Boat"		3:03
6.	"Nonkilling 13 | Ceiling for the Sky"	Krell; Nick Sylvester	5:21
7.	"A Memory, The Spinning of a Body | Nonkilling 2"		5:04
8.	"Nonkilling 6 | Hunger"		5:40
9.	"July 13 No Hope No Pain"		6:35
10.	"Love Means Taking Action"	Krell; Ford; Loke Rahbek	4:23
11.	"Brutal | False Skull 5"		3:20
12.	"False Skull 12"		2:20
13.	"Nothing"		3:52
Total length:			57:24

Sample credits

- "Nonkilling 6 | Hunger" samples "The Cleaving" written and spoken by Li-Young Lee and a sound effect from Hunger (2008) directed by Steve McQueen
- "Love Means Taking Action" interpolates "Love Means Taking Action" by Croatian Amor
- "Brutal | False Skull 5" samples "After Rapture" written and spoken by Ocean Vuong, elements of "Wanting To Die" written and spoken by Anne Sexton, and elements of "Valentine" written and spoken by Frank Bidart
