= Rarely Do I Dream =

2025 studio album by Youth Lagoon

Studio album by Youth Lagoon
- Released: February 21, 2025
- Length: 42:19
- Label: Fat Possum
- Producers: Rodaidh McDonald; Trevor Powers

Youth Lagoon chronology
Heaven Is a Junkyard (2023)	Rarely Do I Dream (2025)

Singles from Rarely Do I Dream
- 1. "Football" Released: January 4, 2024; 2. "Lucy Takes a Picture" Released: May 21, 2024; 3. "My Beautiful Girl" Released: October 8, 2024; 4. "Speed Freak" Released: January 8, 2025; 5. "Gumshoe (Dracula from Arkansas)" Released: February 18, 2025

Rarely Do I Dream is the fifth studio album by American musician Trevor Powers under his Youth Lagoon project. It was released on February 21, 2025, by Fat Possum Records. Produced by Powers and Rodaidh McDonald, Rarely Do I Dream was written by Powers at his home in Idaho after finding a shoebox of old home movies and sampling them to use as "musical cinematography". Powers said, "I wanted to make an album that feels like life itself." Rarely Do I Dream incorporates elements of electronica, ambient music, and post-punk with lyrical themes exploring rural noir, death and rebirth, boyhood memoir, and old-world folklore.

== Background and recording ==
Powers traces the album's origin to his return to Boise in late 2023, after touring in support of his album Heaven Is a Junkyard. Around this time, he went searching for his grandmother's pre-wartime harmonica in his parents' basement and discovered a shoebox containing home videos his family captured on a camcorder. Powers became captivated by the footage on these 8mm tapes, which he had never watched before, and began sampling them from the CRT TV he was watching them on and incorporating them into the music. Powers has emphasized that this inspiration was not rooted in a nostalgia for the past: "It was in these pieces of who I was that showed me where it is, then, that I need to go. They taught me all these things about my family history and the awakening of my spirit." On Rarely Do I Dream, Powers stitched together family archive, childhood memoir, and autobiography with stories of devils, detectives, and folktales. He described the process of honoring his family history while combining elements of rural noir and fantasy as a careful balancing act to function as "one cohesive truth".

Powers co-produced the album with Rodaidh McDonald, who also served as mixer and engineer. The pair had previously worked together on Heaven Is a Junkyard, with Powers praising their creative dynamic: "We hit it off right away. [...] One thing I love so much about Rod is he's not trying to change something that doesn't need to be changed. My demos, everything that I make at home, there's such a specific blueprint to it. He's not trying to get under the hood and change the blueprint—it's more, "Okay, this blueprint is fully functional and everything is very clear, so how do we make it even more effective?" He has an obsession with tones and even how playing the piano should feel like a living, breathing thing. You can have something that's recorded one way and it feels too scary, dark, or mournful, and then you record it a different way and it captures the other emotionally complex side. Rod is so great at helping find what it is that the music is trying to say."

Compared to his previous albums, Powers composed most of Rarely Do I Dream on guitar:

"I hadn't done that since I was a teenager, because it felt so scary. There was such an unpredictability that came with the guitar, whereas the piano is something I've played my whole life and have written on my whole life. Obviously it helps to have that relationship with an instrument, where it feels like it's a part of your spirit. But, with guitar, the music became this creature that was something so fresh. What's shocking to me is how quick it came out and how all of the ideas came out so fully-formed and so dramatically different than anything I had pursued with Heaven Is a Junkyard."

== Release ==
On January 4, 2024, Youth Lagoon released the single "Football", the first new music by the project since the release of Heaven Is a Junkyard in June 2023. A second single, "Lucy Takes a Picture", was released on May 21, 2024, and was accompanied by a music video starring Powers and directed by his longtime creative collaborator Tyler T. Williams. A third single, "My Beautiful Girl", was released on October 8, 2024.

The album was officially announced on January 8, 2025, alongside the release of the single "Speed Freak". It was accompanied by another music video directed by Williams and starring Powers. A North American tour was announced the same day, beginning in Spokane on March 27 and ending at Salt Lake City's Kilby Block Party on May 16. The fifth single, "Gumshoe (Dracula from Arkansas)", was released on February 18, 2025, accompanied by a video Powers directed himself which combines home movies and archival footage. A European tour was announced the same day, beginning in Barcelona on June 3 and ending at London's Islington Assembly Hall on June 19. Rarely Do I Dream was released on February 21, 2025, on Fat Possum Records. A limited edition Dracula red vinyl release features alternate artwork, a 32-page lyric booklet, and a short story written by Powers entitled "Hell Found in Outer Space".

== Critical reception ==
Professional ratings
Aggregate scores
Source	Rating
AnyDecentMusic?	7.7/10
Metacritic	79/100
Review scores
Source	Rating
AllMusic	3.5/5 stars
Beats Per Minute	83%
Exclaim!	8/10
musicOMH	4/5 stars
Paste	9.2/10
Pitchfork	7.4/10
Uncut	8/10
Under the Radar	8.5/10

According to the review aggregator Metacritic, Rarely Do I Dream received "generally favorable reviews" based on a weighted average score of 79 out of 100 from 12 critic scores.

Paste gave the album a score of 9.2/10, with reviewer David Feigelson writing, "Every listen of Rarely Do I Dream brings with it a slice of humanity, a time machine and an embrace you'll carry with you." He goes on to say, "It's a wonder Powers is able to be so intimate and imaginative that the music he creates can feel like it reflects my own life so clearly. When Rarely Do I Dream reaches its end, and the gut punch of a sound collage that is "Home Movies (1989-1993)" takes its last breath, I'm left feeling full -- full of longing for a life that was, full of mourning, full of love for those who are and have been in my life... full of gratitude. Kyle Kohner of Exclaim! wrote, "The album evokes a powerful sense of longing: a yearning for the connection, understanding, and beauty found in fleeting moments." Uncut's Sharon O'Connell praised Powers for delivering "12 songs of poignant autobiography rather than nostalgic wallowing". John Murphy of musicOMH gave it a rating of 4 stars out of 5, and wrote, "Rarely Do I Dream is another beautiful album from Powers [...] It manages to sound both nostalgic and contemporary, full of songs that evoke the warm glow of childhood, but with a creeping menace never too far away." John Amen of Beats Per Minute wrote, "Rarely Do I Dream points more to the intersection of pop and mysticism. There's less immediate hook appeal but more depth. These tracks brim with heartfelt sophistication and aesthetic refinement. The album is a resonant and crucial next step in Powers' pop odyssey." Under the Radar wrote, "Rarely Do I Dream is vital and exciting, and shows its audience, maybe for the first time, a Trevor Powers with a solid foundation and lots of gas in the tank." Journalist Larry Fitzmaurice wrote, "Youth Lagoon's latest record Rarely Do I Dream might be, to my ears, Trevor Powers' best record yet under the guise; it's purely dazzling in working with texture and melody." Adam Clarke of The Quietus praised the album, highlighting the rural noir and poetic balance between darkness and light, "His home videos are filled with warmth and possibility, they play over dark coming of age stories of broken families, missed opportunities, and drift. Powers narrates each story carefully, fully aware of the fragility of the lives he chronicles."

Marcy Donelson of AllMusic viewed the album as a return to a "lusher, full-band palette" with songs "full of affection", but concluded by saying that it occasionally felt "like an album for an audience of one, like a personal collage of photographs and cards on a pinboard behind the laptop monitor in the den". Lily Goldberg of Pitchfork found Powers' vocals to be "more fluidly integrated into the production" at the expense of his "characteristic experimentation", writing that the album highlighted his "gifts for lyrical microfiction and stirring compositions, with an emotional core that feels fugitive. As Powers harnesses a hard-earned confidence to narrate the world of Rarely Do I Dream, he leaves some of his idiosyncratic vulnerability—a well of raw feeling unmatched by even the most pathos-inducing VHS clips—in the rearview."

== Track listing ==
All tracks are written by Trevor Powers.

Rarely Do I Dream track listing
No.	Title	Length
1.	"Neighborhood Scene"	4:14
2.	"Speed Freak"	3:29
3.	"Football"	3:25
4.	"Gumshoe (Dracula From Arkansas)"	4:06
5.	"Seersucker"	3:00
6.	"Lucy Takes a Picture"	4:18
7.	"Perfect World"	4:01
8.	"My Beautiful Girl"	2:14
9.	"Canary"	4:38
10.	"Parking Lot"	2:23
11.	"Saturday Cowboy Matinee"	2:57
12.	"Home Movies (1989-1993)"	3:34
Total length:		42:19

== Personnel ==
Credits adapted from Bandcamp.

- Trevor Powers – vocals, piano, guitar, synthesizer, programming, production, VHS editing
- Rodaidh McDonald – production, engineering, mixing
- Erik Eastman – guitar
- Gabe Noel – bass and lap steel
- Sam KS – drums and percussion
- Bonnita Lee – viola
- Stewart Cole – horns ("Canary")
- Phil Hartunian – additional engineering
- Heba Kadry – mastering
- Tyler T. Williams – photography
- Regrets Only – art direction and design
