= Long Way Home (Låpsley album) =

Studio album by Låpsley
- Released: 4 March 2016
- Recorded: 2014–16
- Length: 41:00
- Label: XL Recordings
- Producer: Låpsley; Rodaidh McDonald; Paul O'Duffy; Romans; Tourist; Mura Masa

Låpsley chronology
Understudy (2015)	Long Way Home (2016)	These Elements (2019)

Singles from Long Way Home
- 1. "Station" Released: 12 January 2014; 2. "Painter (Valentine)" Released: 15 July 2014; 3. "Falling Short" Released: 24 October 2014; 4. "Hurt Me" Released: 20 August 2015; 5. "Love Is Blind" Released: 19 January 2016; 6. "Operator (DJ Koze Radio Edit)" Released: 26 August 2016

Long Way Home is the debut studio album written and produced by British singer, songwriter and musician Låpsley. It was released on 4 March 2016 through XL Recordings.

== Track listing ==
Long Way Home
No.	Title	Writer(s)	Producer(s)	Length
1.	"Heartless"	Holly Lapsley Fletcher	Låpsley; Rodaidh McDonald	4:14
2.	"Hurt Me"	Fletcher; James Napier; William Phillips; James Draper	Låpsley; McDonald; Tourist; Charlie Hugall	3:51
3.	"Falling Short"	Fletcher; Draper	Låpsley; Draper	3:23
4.	"Cliff"	Fletcher; Rodaidh McDonald	Låpsley; McDonald	4:28
5.	"Operator (He Doesn't Call Me)"	Fletcher; McDonald; William Spivery	Låpsley; McDonald	3:24
6.	"Painter"	Fletcher	Låpsley	3:08
7.	"Tell Me the Truth"	Fletcher; Paul Staveley O'Duffy	Låpsley; O'Duffy	3:55
8.	"Station"	Fletcher	Låpsley	3:16
9.	"Love Is Blind"	Fletcher; Sam Romans	Låpsley; McDonald; ROMANS; Hugall	4:10
10.	"Silverlake"	Fletcher; O'Duffy	Låpsley; O'Duffy	4:21
11.	"Leap"	Fletcher; McDonald	Låpsley; McDonald	4:49
12.	"Seven Months"	Fletcher; Alex Crossan	Låpsley; Mura Masa	3:29
Total length:				41:00

== Personnel ==
- Låpsley – vocals, drum programming, guitar, percussion, piano, programming, synthesizer
- Phil Lee – art direction, design
- Drew Bang – assistance
- Romans – backing vocals, percussion, programming, synthesizer
- Otto Williams – bass
- Rodaidh McDonald – drum programming
- Tom Coyne – mastering
- Ben Baptie – mixing
- James Draper – percussion, programming, synthesizer
- Mura Masa – percussion, programming, synthesizer
- Luke & Nik – photography
- Charlie Hugall – vocal production
- Paul O'Duffy – vocals

== Charts ==
=== Weekly charts ===
Chart (2016)	Peak position
Australia (ARIA)	75
Belgian Albums (Ultratop Flanders)	20
Belgian Albums (Ultratop Wallonia)	47
Canadian Albums (Billboard)	70
French Albums (SNEP)	195
German Albums (Offizielle Top 100)	83
Dutch Albums (Album Top 100)	59
Ireland (IRMA)	92
Scottish Albums (OCC)	48
Swedish Albums (Sverigetopplistan)	54
Swiss Albums (Schweizer Hitparade)	76
United Kingdom (OCC)	32
UK Independent Albums (OCC)	5
US Billboard 200	196

=== Year-end charts ===
Chart (2016)	Position
Belgian Albums (Ultratop Flanders)	199
