= Lulu Tenney =

American fashion model (born 2001)

- Tenney at Roberto Cavalli FW22
- Born: June 27, 2001 (age 25); New York City, U.S.
- Occupation: Model
- Years active: 2016–present
- Modeling information
- Height: 5 ft 10.5 in (1.79 m)
- Hair color: Dark blonde
- Eye color: Green
- Agency: LUMIEN Creative (New York); Ford Models (Paris); Supa Model Management (London); Fabbrica Milano Management (Milan); LUMIEN Creative Spain (Barcelona)

Lulu Tenney (born June 27, 2001) is an American fashion model. She began her career as an exclusive for Calvin Klein, opening Raf Simons's first show for the house. She has appeared on the cover of Vogue Italia three times, beginning with the September 2016 issue, and has since appeared on the covers of Vogue España, Vogue Korea, Vogue Hong Kong, and Vogue Japan. Models.com includes her in its "Top 50" ranking, and she was nominated for the site's Model of the Year award in 2024 and 2025.

== Career ==
Tenney was scouted on the street in Manhattan by a woman who became her manager. Her first Vogue Italia cover, photographed by Steven Meisel, was the September 2016 issue, when she was 15 years old. She returned to the cover for Emanuele Farneti's first issue in March 2017, and again in September 2020.

Tenney made her runway debut opening the Fall/Winter 2017 Calvin Klein show, Raf Simons's first collection for the house, and as an exclusive for the brand opened its next three shows. Her underwear ad from the brand's spring 2017 campaign was removed from House of Fraser windows in the United Kingdom after complaints that it sexualized children. She starred in the brand's "Our Family. #MyCalvins" spring 2018 campaign with Millie Bobby Brown and Paris Jackson.

After her Calvin Klein exclusive period, Tenney's first Paris show was Dior. On the runway, she has also walked for Ralph Lauren, Alberta Ferretti, Givenchy, Chanel, Chloé, Fendi, Marc Jacobs, Hugo Boss, Valentino, Hermès, Dries van Noten, Prada, Jason Wu, Salvatore Ferragamo, Anna Sui, Celine, and Tory Burch, among others.

In addition to Vogue Russia, Vogue Me China, and Vogue Ukraine, Tenney has appeared on the cover of Dazed magazine. Since 2023, she has added covers of Vogue Korea (July 2023, January 2024, and May 2025), Vogue Hong Kong (April 2024), and Vogue Japan (February 2025). She covered Vogue España in August 2024 and again in February 2026, the latter issue photographed by Sebastián Faena in Barcelona.

In 2017, Tenney appeared with Millie Bobby Brown, Paris Jackson, and Ashton Sanders in The xx's music video "I Dare You", a collaboration between the band, Simons, and director Alasdair McLellan.

In 2025, Tenney was one of the 50 models in Zara's "50 Years, 50 Icons" anniversary video, directed by Steven Meisel, and appeared alongside Tilda Swinton and Liu Wen in Chanel's 2024/25 Métiers d'art campaign, photographed by Mikael Jansson in Hangzhou. In 2026, she appeared in Max Mara's Fall/Winter 2026 campaign.
