= I Am Toward You =

Studio album by How to Dress Well
- Released: May 10, 2024
- Length: 41:03
- Label: Sargent House

How to Dress Well chronology
What Remains (Remixes) (2023)	I Am Toward You (2024)

I Am Toward You is the sixth studio album by American musician Tom Krell under his stage name How to Dress Well, released on May 10, 2024, via Sargent House. It has received positive reviews from critics.

== Reception ==
Editors at AllMusic rated this album 3.5 out of 5 stars, with critic Heather Phares writing that Krell's "regimen of intense meditation and psychedelic medicine" are evident on this album, including due to "the newfound openness of Krell's sound and lyrics" and this release's "self-discovery reveals many possibilities for How to Dress Well, and even if they're not as cohesive as some of Krell's previous music, they're promising". Editors at Pitchfork scored this release 7.1 out of 10 and critic Brady Brickner-Wood praised stated that "the extremes can be daunting, but the highs are ecstatic" in the music that "feels like a decisive step away from institutions and industries where art and philosophy are packaged as commodities". Editors at Stereogum chose this as Album of the Week, where critic Chris DeVille wrote that "it feels like a natural outgrowth of high-minded, pop-adjacent, internet-native music of the past 15 years", comparing the sound to Oneohtrix Point Never and the 1975.

== Track listing ==
1. "New Confusion" – 3:45
2. "Contingency/Necessity (Modality of Fate)" – 3:55
3. "Crypt Sustain" – 3:40
4. "No Light" – 4:15
5. "nothingprayer" – 3:50
6. "On It and Around It" – 4:43
7. "Song in the Middle" – 2:50
8. "Gas Station Against Blackened Hillside" – 3:32
9. "A Faint Glow Through a Window of Thin Bone (That's How My Fate Is Shown)" – 4:50
10. "The Only True Joy on Earth" – 1:43
11. "A Secret Within the Voice" – 4:00

== Personnel ==
- How to Dress Well – instrumentation, vocals
- Noah Allaire – vocals on "nothingprayer"
- Brian Allen Simon – reed instruments on "nothingprayer"
- Anarthia DLT – vocals on "No Light"
- Ukiah Bogle – drums on "Song in the Middle"
- CFCF – instrumentation across the record
- Joshua James Clancy – artwork
- Adam Badî Donovan – additional audio mastering
- Zac Emerson – audio mastering
- Joel Ford – vocal engineering across the record
- Dan Krell – inspiration and poetics across the record
- Patrick McDermott – instrumentation on "A Secret Within the Voice"
- Aaron Read – guitar on "nothingprayer"
- Trayer Tryon – instrumentation and inspiration across the record, mixing
- Chris Votek – cello on "A Faint Glow Through a Window of Thin Bone (That's How My Fate Is Shown)"

== See also ==
- 2024 in American music
- List of 2024 albums
