= Trevor Powers =

American musician (born 1989)

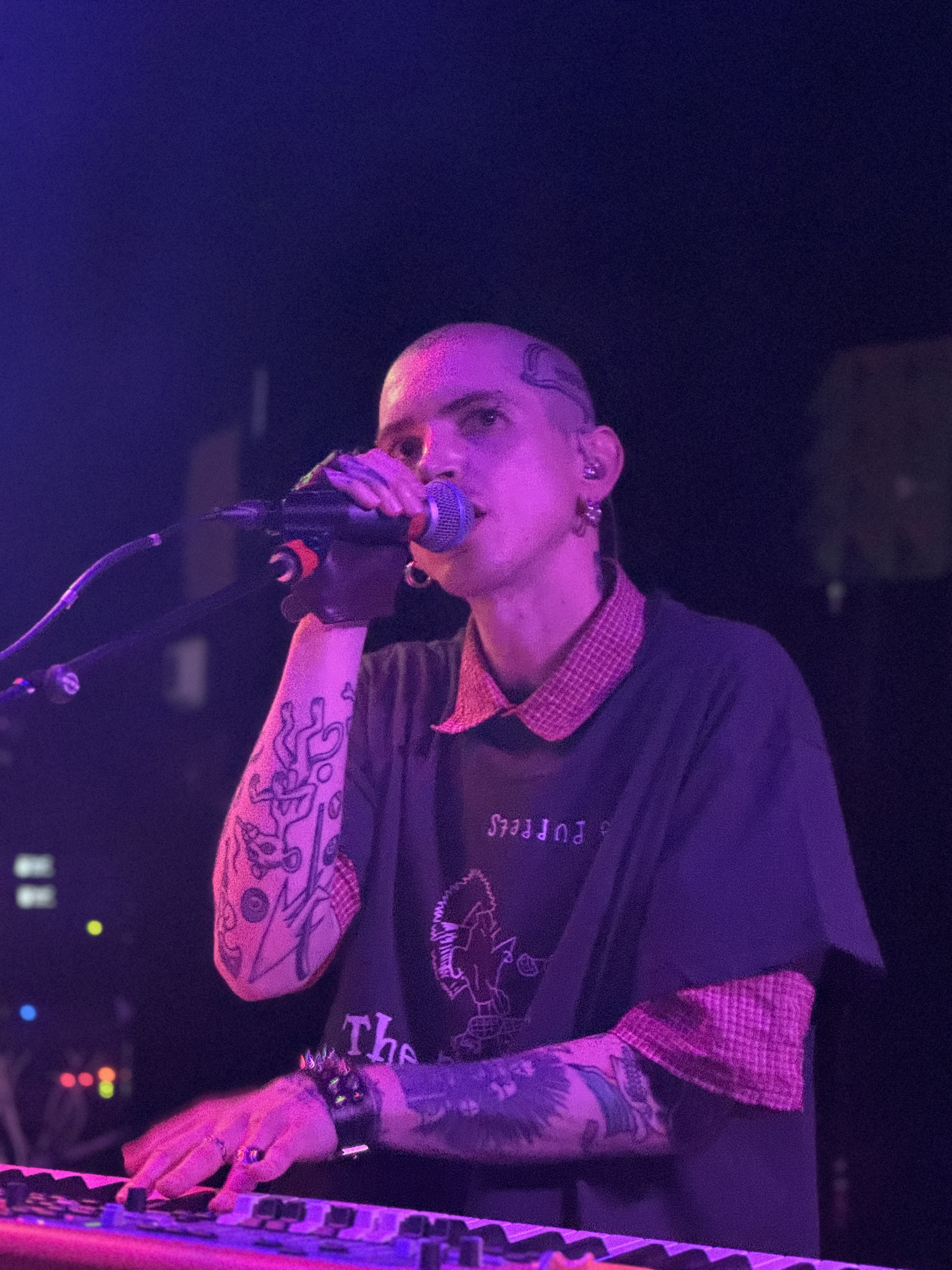
- Powers performing in Denver in May 2025

Background information
- Also known as: Youth Lagoon
- Born: March 18, 1989 (age 37); San Diego, California, U.S.
- Origin: Boise, Idaho, U.S.
- Genres: Electronic · experimental · Art pop · Americana · neo-psychedelia · dream pop
- Years active: 2010–present
- Labels: Baby Halo, Fat Possum
- Website: http://www.trevorpowe.rs/

Trevor Powers (born March 18, 1989), better known by his stage name Youth Lagoon, is an American musician from Boise, Idaho. Youth Lagoon's music has been described as "noir rock," often incorporating lyrical themes of rural noir, drug use, spirituality, family, and fantasy and includes elements of neo-psychedelia, pop, Americana, electronic and experimental music.

Powers was initially active as Youth Lagoon between 2010 and 2016, releasing three studio albums – The Year of Hibernation (2011), Wondrous Bughouse (2013) and Savage Hills Ballroom (2015) – before announcing his retirement from the project. He returned to music in 2018, releasing two studio albums under his own name, before announcing the return of his Youth Lagoon moniker in 2022.

Working closely with producer Rodaidh McDonald, Powers released his fourth Youth Lagoon album, Heaven Is a Junkyard, in 2023 to widespread critical acclaim. The album was followed by Rarely Do I Dream in 2025, to further acclaim, with its lyrical content rooted in boyhood memoir and old-world folklore and incorporates samples from home movies.

== Career ==
=== 2011–2016: Youth Lagoon, The Year of Hibernation, Wondrous Bughouse and Savage Hills Ballroom ===
Youth Lagoon's debut album, The Year of Hibernation, was released on Fat Possum Records on September 27, 2011. Based on minimalism and hypnotic ambience melded with atmospheric and electronic elements, the debut explored themes such as psychological dysphoria and mental distress.

Youth Lagoon's second album, Wondrous Bughouse, was released on March 5, 2013, by Fat Possum. It was spawned from what he described as "becoming more fascinated with the human psyche and where spirituality meets the physical world." During the time he composed the album, Powers became intrigued with metaphysics and he blended those ideas with pop music. Youth Lagoon's tour in support of Wondrous Bughouse was cut short due to the death of a close friend of Powers.

On November 12, 2014, Powers announced, via Twitter, that writing for his third album had been finished. Recording started in January 2015. The July 10, 2015, release of "The Knower", a free single-sided 7" single, marked the announcement of his third album, Savage Hills Ballroom, released on September 25, 2015. In July 2015, Youth Lagoon announced a US tour in support of Savage Hills Ballroom.

=== 2016–2022: Releasing music under his own name ===
On February 1, 2016, Powers announced on Twitter that his Youth Lagoon project was concluding.

On May 2, 2018, Powers announced his return to music by issuing a personal letter along with the single "Playwright", his first song release since 2015. The letter elaborated on Power's self-titled project, highlighting the project as a new work.

On May 20, 2018, he announced that he would release his first album under his own name, Mulberry Violence, in late 2018. Powers released two more singles from the forthcoming album, "Ache" and "Plaster Saint" with a newly penned letter providing more insight into the project.

On July 29, 2020, Powers surprise-released his second album as Trevor Powers, titled Capricorn, along with limited-edition cassettes and booklet designed by Los Angeles-based designer Collin Fletcher, who also designed the artwork for the album.

=== 2022–present: Return to Youth Lagoon, Heaven Is a Junkyard and Rarely Do I Dream ===
On November 10, 2022, Powers announced that he would be releasing a new album as Youth Lagoon. He recorded the album with producer Rodaidh McDonald. Powers credited his discovery of meditation as a motivating factor in returning to the Youth Lagoon name: "The creative portal opened up in a way that I never thought was possible. That's why Youth Lagoon as an entity is, for all intents and purposes, such a brand new project now. When I killed it off in 2016, there was no clarity in my life. I didn't know what to do. I didn't know where to take it. When I had that spiritual reset, it fine-tuned my eyes and that deep part of my soul, in a way where it showed me exactly what to do with music and where I'm going."

The resulting album, Heaven Is a Junkyard, was released June 9, 2023 on Fat Possum Records. The album received widespread critical acclaim, receiving a Best New Music accolade from Pitchfork and placing highly on several publications' end-of-year lists. Powers released his fifth Youth Lagoon album, Rarely Do I Dream, on February 21, 2025, to further acclaim, with its lyrical content rooted in spiritualism, old-world folklore, and boyhood memoir informed by Powers' discovery of home videos in his parents' basement. In February 2025, he announced a North American tour in support of the album.

== Personal life ==
In October 2021 after taking an over-the-counter medication, Powers had a severe drug reaction which turned his stomach into a "non-stop geyser of acid," coating his larynx and vocal cords for eight months. "I saw seven doctors and multiple specialists. I lost over thirty pounds. No one could help me," says Powers. By Christmas, he could no longer speak, turning to text messages and a pen and paper as his only ways to communicate. "I wasn’t sure if I’d ever be able to speak again, let alone sing," he says. "It all felt symbolic in a way," he adds. "I’d been swallowing fear all my life and now here it was coming back up. I used to think God watches people suffer. Now I know God suffers with you. That changed everything.” Trevor's voice slowly came back as he recorded music for Heaven Is a Junkyard.

== Discography ==
=== As Youth Lagoon ===
==== Studio albums ====
- The Year of Hibernation (2011, Fat Possum Records)
- Wondrous Bughouse (2013, Fat Possum Records)
- Savage Hills Ballroom (2015, Fat Possum Records)
- Heaven Is a Junkyard (2023, Fat Possum Records)
- Rarely Do I Dream (2025, Fat Possum Records)

==== Singles ====
- Youth Lagoon" 7" (2011, Fat Possum Records)
- "Mute" promo CD, digital (2013, Fat Possum Records)
- "The Knower" 7", digital (2015, Fat Possum Records)
- "Idaho Alien" digital (2023, Fat Possum Records)
- "Prizefighter" digital (2023, Fat Possum Records)
- "The Sling" digital (2023, Fat Possum Records)
- "Football" 7", digital (2024, Fat Possum Records)
- "Lucy Takes a Picture" 7", digital (2024, Fat Possum Records)
- "My Beautiful Girl" 7", digital (2024, Fat Possum Records)
- "Speed Freak" digital (2025, Fat Possum Records)
- "Gumshoe (Dracula From Arkansas)" (2025, Fat Possum Records)

=== As Trevor Powers ===
==== Studio albums ====
- Mulberry Violence (2018, Baby Halo)
- Capricorn (2020, Fat Possum Records)

==== Singles ====
- "Playwright" digital (2018, Baby Halo)
- "Ache" digital (2018, Baby Halo)
- "Plaster Saint" digital (2018, Baby Halo)
