= Låpsley =

English singer-songwriter

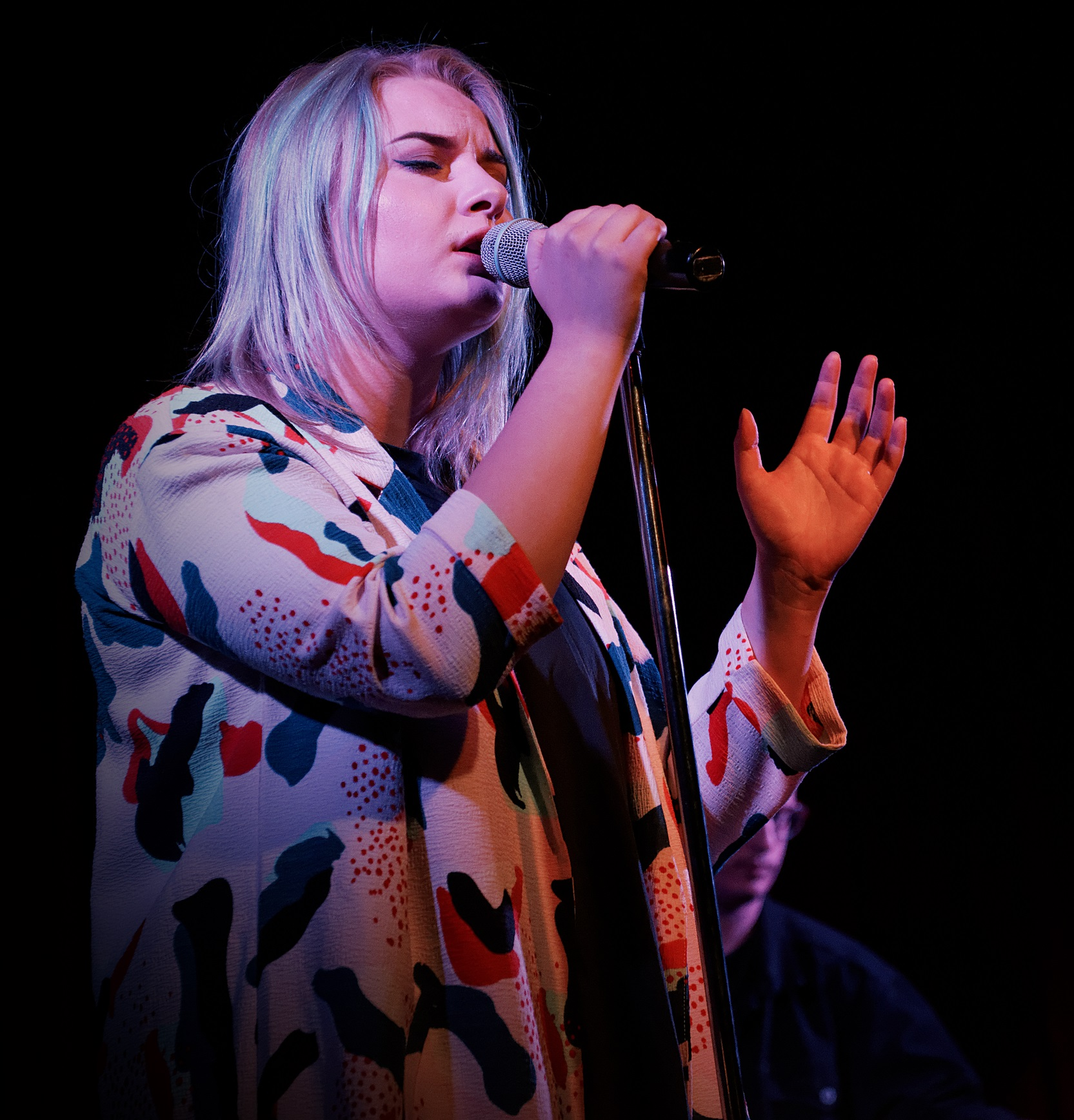
- Låpsley performing in 2015

Background information
- Born: Holly Lapsley Fletcher; 7 August 1996 (age 30); York, England
- Origin: Southport, Merseyside, England
- Genres: Art pop; soul; ambient; alternative R&B
- Occupations: Singer; songwriter; musician
- Instruments: Vocals; piano; guitar; oboe; synthesizer
- Years active: 2013–present
- Labels: Believe; XL
- Website: lapsley.os.fan

Holly Lapsley Fletcher (born 7 August 1996), known by the stage name Låpsley, is an English singer, songwriter, musician and producer. Her debut album Long Way Home was released on 4 March 2016.

== Early life ==
Låpsley was born in York. Her middle name, Lapsley, is her mother's maiden name. She changed "Lapsley" to "Låpsley" by adding the Scandinavian character Å, partly due to her perceived ties with Scandinavia through her Scottish heritage, as well as how it looked when written. She grew up in Southport, Merseyside, where she attended Greenbank High School and Formby High School for sixth form.

== Career ==
=== 2013–present ===
Having been a member of several bands in the Merseyside area, Låpsley won the "One to Watch" prize at Merseyside's GIT (Getintothis) Award in April 2014, following over half a million listens of her solo bedroom-recorded Monday EP on SoundCloud. She played the BBC Introducing stage at Glastonbury Festival in June 2014, having been championed by BBC Radio 1 DJ's Huw Stephens and Zane Lowe. Her track Painter (Valentine) was playlisted by BBC Radio 1 in September 2014 and received daytime airplay.

Låpsley signed with XL Recordings in October 2014. On 30 November 2014, Låpsley was revealed as one of acts on the BBC Sound of...2015 long list. Her Understudy EP was released on 5 January 2015. Her debut album, Long Way Home, was released on 4 March 2016. She performed at Lollapalooza in July 2016.

In April 2016, she was picked as Elvis Duran's Artist of the Month and was featured on NBC's Today show hosted by Kathie Lee Gifford and Hoda Kotb, broadcast nationally, where she performed live her single "Love Is Blind". In 2016, the track "8896" by Låpsley was included in the sound track of American Honey, directed by Andrea Arnold. In the same year, track "Falling Short" was included in season one of Harlan Coben's The Five (TV series), during the final scene of episode 4, directed by Mark Tonderai.

== Personal life ==
Låpsley enjoys yachting and owns a boat called Theodore. On 28 June 2020, she came out as bisexual in an Instagram post. In exchanges on Instagram, Låpsley has stated that she is studying Politics, Philosophy and Economics (PPE) at Goldsmiths University.

During the 2024 UK general election, the Labour Party used Better Times by Låpsley and KC Lights as a soft campaign song, and she sang it live to a Keir Starmer rally on 29 June.

== Discography ==
=== Albums ===
Title	Details	Peak chart positions									
Title	Details	UK	AUS	BEL (FL)	CAN	GER	NL	IRL	SWE	SWI	US
Long Way Home	Released: 4 March 2016; Label: XL; Formats: CD, digital download, LP, streaming	32	75	20	70	83	59	92	54	76	196
Through Water	Released: 20 March 2020; Label: XL; Formats: CD, digital download, LP, streaming, 7-inch vinyl	—	—	193	—	—	—	—	—	—	—
Cautionary Tales of Youth	Released: 20 January 2023; Label: Believe, Young; Formats: CD, digital download, LP, streaming, cassette	—	—	—	—	—	—	—	—	—	—
I'm a Hurricane I'm a Woman in Love	Released: 2 May 2025; Label: Her Own Recordings; Formats: Digital download, LP, streaming	—	—	—	—	—	—	—	—	—	—

=== Extended plays ===
Title	Details
Monday	Released: 18 March 2014; Label: Self-released; Format: Digital download
Understudy	Released: 5 January 2015; Label: XL Recordings; Formats: 12", Digital download
These Elements	Released: 6 December 2019; Label: XL Recordings; Formats: 12", Digital download
A Guilty Heart Can Never Rest	Released: 10 May 2024; Label: Believe UK; Formats: Digital download

=== Singles ===
Title	Year	Peak chart positions						Certifications	Album
Title	Year	UK	UK Indie	BEL (FL)	BEL (WA)	CAN DL	JPN	Certifications	Album
"Station"	2014	— (Note: "Station" did not enter the UK Singles Chart, but peaked at number 53 on the UK Physical Singles Chart.)	— (Note: "Station" did not enter the UK Singles Chart, but peaked at number 11 on the UK Independent Singles Breakers Chart.)	—	—	—	—		Long Way Home
"Painter (Valentine)"	2014	—	— (Note: "Painter (Valentine)" did not enter the UK Singles Chart, but peaked at number 10 on the UK Independent Singles Breakers Chart.)	—	—	—	—		Long Way Home
"Falling Short"	2014	122	6	— (Note: "Falling Short" did not enter the Flanders Ultratop 50, but peaked at number 3 on the Ultratip chart.)	—	—	—		Long Way Home
"Brownlow"	2015	—	—	—	—	—	—		Understudy EP
"Hurt Me"	2015	170	9	8	— (Note: "Hurt Me" did not enter the Wallonia Ultratop 50, but peaked at number 20 on the Ultratip chart.)	29	74	BEA: Gold	Long Way Home
"Love Is Blind"	2016	—	29	43	—	—	—		Long Way Home
"Operator (He Doesn't Call Me)"	2016	— (Note: "Operator (He Doesn't Call Me)" did not enter the UK Singles Chart, but peaked at number 65 on the UK Physical Chart.)	—	— (Note: "Operator (He Doesn't Call Me)" did not enter the Flanders Ultratop 50, but peaked at number 32 on the Ultratip chart.)	—	—	—		Long Way Home
"My Love Was Like the Rain"	2019	— (Note: "My Love Was Like the Rain" did not enter the UK Singles Chart, but peaked at number 14 on the UK Physical Chart.)	—	—	—	—	—		These Elements and Through Water
"Ligne 3"	2019	—	—	— (Note: "Ligne 3" did not enter the Flanders Ultratop 50, but peaked at number 24 on the Ultratip chart.)	—	—	—		These Elements and Through Water
"Womxn"	2020	—	—	—	—	—	—		Through Water
"Speaking of the End"	2020	—	—	—	—	—	—		Through Water
"Make U Stay" (with Sega Bodega)	2020	—	—	—	—	—	—		Non-album single
"32 Floors"	2022	—	—	—	—	—	—		Cautionary Tales of Youth
"Dial Two Seven"	2022	—	—	—	—	—	—		Cautionary Tales of Youth
"Smoke and Fire"	2022	—	—	—	—	—	—		Cautionary Tales of Youth
"Hotel Corridors"	2022	—	—	—	—	—	—		Cautionary Tales of Youth
"Lifeline"	2023	—	—	—	—	—	—		Cautionary Tales of Youth
"4am Ascension Day"	2024	—	—	—	—	—	—		A Guilty Heart Can Never Rest
"Popstar" (with Alice Ivy)	2024	—	—	—	—	—	—		Do What Makes You Happy
"Build a Man"	2024	—	—	—	—	—	—		A Guilty Heart Can Never Rest
"Angeles"	2024	—	—	—	—	—	—		A Guilty Heart Can Never Rest
"Stolen Glances" (with Franky Wah)	2024	—	—	—	—	—	—		Non-album single
"Church"	2024	—	—	—	—	—	—		I'm a Hurricane I'm a Woman in Love
"Better"	2025	—	—	—	—	—	—		I'm a Hurricane I'm a Woman in Love
"Hurricane"	2025	—	—	—	—	—	—		I'm a Hurricane I'm a Woman in Love
"—" denotes a single that did not chart or was not released.

== Music videos ==
Title	Year	Director	Ref.
"Station"	2014	Mike Brits	
"Painter (Valentine)"	2014	Harvey Pearson	
"Falling Short"	2014	Noel Paul	
"Brownlow"	2015	Cherise Payne and Låpsley	
"Hurt Me"	2015	Cherise Payne	
"Love Is Blind"	2016	Cherise Payne	
"Operator (DJ Koze Radio Edit)"	2016	Cherise Payne	
"My Love Was Like The Rain"	2019	Camille Summers-Valli	
"Womxn"	2020	Jane Stockdale	
"Hotel Corridors"	2023		
"Dial Two Seven"	2023		
"4am Ascension Day"	2024		
"Build a Man"	2024		

== Awards and nominations ==
Year	Organisation	Award	Result
2014	GIT (Getintothis)	One to Watch	Won
2015	BBC	Sound of...2015	Nominated
2016	NME	Best New Artist	Nominated
