= Hurt Me (Låpsley song) =

Single by Låpsley

from the album Long Way Home
- Released: 20 August 2015
- Length: 3:51
- Label: XL Recordings
- Songwriter(s): Holly Lapsley Fletcher; James Napier; William Phillips; James Draper
- Producer(s): Låpsley; McDonald; Tourist; Charlie Hugall

Låpsley singles chronology
"Brownlow" (2015)	"Hurt Me" (2015)	"Love is Blind" (2016)

Music video
- "Hurt Me" on YouTube

"Hurt Me" is a song by British singer Låpsley. It was released on 20 August 2015 as the fourth single from Låpsley's debut studio album, Long Way Home.

== Reception ==
James Rettig from Stereogum said "The track begs for feeling, even if it's a bad one, and the ticking clock of a beat in the background makes everything just a little bit more urgent". Nic Kelly from Project U called the song "Pop Perfection" saying it "is emotional balladry at its most divine, honest and relevant".

== Track listing ==
No.	Title	Length
1.	"Hurt Me"	3:41
2.	"Burn"	4:16

== Charts ==
Chart (2015)	Peak position
Belgium (Ultratop 50 Flanders)	8
Japan (Oricon)	74
UK Singles Downloads (OCC)	93

== Certifications ==
Region	Certification	Certified units/sales
Belgium (BEA)	Gold	10,000^{‡}
^{‡} Sales+streaming figures based on certification alone.
