= On Hold =

Single by the xx

from the album I See You
- Released: 10 November 2016
- Length: 3:44
- Label: Young Turks
- Songwriters: Romy Madley Croft; Oliver Sim; Jamie Smith; Daryl Hall; John Oates; Sara Allen
- Producers: Jamie xx; Rodaidh McDonald

The xx singles chronology
"Fiction" (2013)	"On Hold" (2016)	"Say Something Loving" (2017)

Music video
- "On Hold" on YouTube

"On Hold" is a song by English indie pop band the xx. It was released on 10 November 2016 as the lead single from their third studio album, I See You (2017). The song peaked at number 34 on the UK Singles Chart, and became one of their highest-charting singles internationally.

== Composition ==
The song was produced by band member Jamie xx as well as frequent collaborator Rodaidh McDonald. The instrumental samples "I Can't Go for That (No Can Do)" by Hall & Oates. Vocals are sung back-and-forth between Romy Madley Croft and Oliver Sim.

== Release ==
"On Hold" was released on 10 November 2016 as the lead single promoting their third studio album, I See You (2017). The xx performed the song live on the 19 November 2016 episode of Saturday Night Live.

== Commercial performance ==
"On Hold" entered the UK Singles Chart at number 38 on the week of 18 November 2016, and eventually peaked at number thirty-four, matching their highest-charting position with "Islands". It also peaked at number three on the UK Indie Chart. In the United States, the song entered the Billboard Bubbling Under Hot 100 at number twenty, and eventually peaked at number 2; their third and highest entry on the chart, and the Hot Rock Songs chart at number seven. Elsewhere, the song peaked at number 22 in Belgium's Ultratop 50 Flanders chart, number 34 in Scotland, number 45 in Australia, and number 50 in both Ireland and Spain.

== Music video ==
The music video for "On Hold" was directed by Alasdair McLellan and filmed in Marfa, Texas.

== Remix ==
On 12 September 2017, band member Jamie xx debuted his remix version of "On Hold" on Annie Mac's BBC Radio 1 show. The remix was made available for online streaming on 13 September. On 8 December, it was released as a limited-edition 12-inch single which also included Four Tet's remix of "A Violent Noise", another track from I See You. The remix also received an updated music video, directed by Alasdair McLellan.

Matthew Schnipper of Pitchfork said the remix "reaches for some dynamism, by way of Ibiza", and called it "a perfect song for hearing everywhere". Writing for DJ Mag, Martin Guttridge-Hewitt stated the remix "offers a vibe more suited to peak-time club moments rather than its pop-infused source material".

== Track listing ==
Digital download / 7-inch single
No.	Title	Length
1.	"On Hold"	3:44

== Charts ==
=== Weekly charts ===
Chart (2016–17)	Peak position
Australia (ARIA)	45
Belgium (Ultratop 50 Flanders)	11
Belgium (Ultratip Bubbling Under Wallonia)	7
Czech Republic Singles Digital (ČNS IFPI)	57
Finland Airplay (Radiosoittolista)	99
France (SNEP)	52
Germany (GfK)	84
Iceland (RÚV)	16
Ireland (IRMA)	50
Japan Hot 100 (Billboard)	43
Mexico Airplay (Billboard)	44
Poland Airplay (ZPAV)	86
Portugal (AFP)	49
Scottish Singles Sales (Official Charts)	25
Slovakia Singles Digital (ČNS IFPI)	77
Spain (Promusicae)	50
Sweden Heatseeker (Sverigetopplistan)	3
Switzerland (Schweizer Hitparade)	50
UK Singles (Official Charts)	34
UK Indie (Official Charts)	1
US Bubbling Under Hot 100 (Billboard)	2
US Hot Rock & Alternative Songs (Billboard)	7
US Rock & Alternative Airplay (Billboard)	22

=== Year-end charts ===
Chart (2017)	Position
Belgium (Ultratop Flanders)	89
Latvia Airplay (LaIPA)	51
US Hot Rock Songs (Billboard)	35

== Certifications ==
Region	Certification	Certified units/sales
Australia (ARIA)	Gold	35,000^{‡}
Belgium (BRMA)	Gold	10,000^{‡}
Canada (Music Canada)	Gold	40,000^{‡}
Italy (FIMI)	Gold	25,000^{‡}
New Zealand (RMNZ)	Gold	15,000^{‡}
United Kingdom (BPI)	Gold	400,000^{‡}
United States (RIAA)	Gold	500,000^{‡}
^{‡} Sales+streaming figures based on certification alone.

== Release history ==
Country	Date	Format	Label	Ref.
United Kingdom	12 November 2016	Digital download	Young Turks	
United Kingdom	9 December 2016	7-inch single	Young Turks	
