= "What Is This Heart?" =

Studio album by How to Dress Well
- Released: June 23, 2014
- Genres: Alternative R&B; experimental; ambient; lo-fi; experimental pop
- Length: 55:01
- Label: Weird World

How to Dress Well chronology
| Total Loss (2012) | "What Is This Heart?" (2014) | Care (2016) |

"What Is This Heart?" is the third studio album by American musician How to Dress Well, released on June 23, 2014, on Weird World, an imprint of Domino. It is his highest-charting album, peaking at number 145 on the Billboard 200.

The songs "A Power" and "What You Wanted" were co-written and co-produced by CFCF.

== Title ==
Krell described the album's title in a message on Twitter:

my new album is called "What Is This Heart?"--- just like that, in quotes, like a spoken question.

== Critical reception ==
Professional ratings
Aggregate scores
| Source | Rating |
|---|---|
| AnyDecentMusic? | 7.1/10 |
| Metacritic | 69/100 |
Review scores
| Source | Rating |
| AllMusic | 4/5 stars |
| The A.V. Club | C+ |
| Fact | 4/5 |
| The Guardian | 4/5 stars |
| NME | 5/10 |
| Pitchfork | 8.8/10 |
| Q | 4/5 stars |
| Rolling Stone | 3/5 stars |
| Slant Magazine | 4/5 stars |
| Spin | 7/10 |

"What Is This Heart?" received mostly positive reviews from contemporary music critics. At Metacritic, which assigns a normalized rating out of 100 to reviews from mainstream critics, the album received an average score of 69, based on 32 reviews, which indicates "generally favorable reviews".

Ian Cohen of Pitchfork gave a very positive review of the album, stating, ""What Is This Heart?" makes you initially susceptible and vulnerable, and that's risky when modern discourse seeks metaphorical blood, allowing people to disclose more than ever without actually revealing anything. So make no mistake, the title of this album is a challenge as well, as How to Dress Well's modern masterpiece is conducted with the most eternal transparency—Krell asks "what is this heart" and lets you look right into his own."

== Track listing ==
"What Is This Heart?" track listing
| No. | Title | Length |
|---|---|---|
| 1. | "2 Years On (Shame Dream)" | 3:50 |
| 2. | "What You Wanted" | 5:28 |
| 3. | "Face Again" | 4:29 |
| 4. | "See You Fall" | 3:17 |
| 5. | "Repeat Pleasure" | 3:36 |
| 6. | "Words I Don't Remember" | 6:18 |
| 7. | "Pour Cyril" | 4:12 |
| 8. | "Precious Love" | 4:04 |
| 9. | "Childhood Faith in Love (Everything Must Change, Everything Must Stay the Same)" | 3:47 |
| 10. | "A Power" | 5:00 |
| 11. | "Very Best Friend" | 4:54 |
| 12. | "House Inside (Future Is Older Than the Past)" | 6:06 |
| Total length: | | 55:01 |
