= Mulberry Violence =

Studio album by Trevor Powers
- Released: August 17, 2018
- Studio: Sonic Ranch (Tornillo, Texas)
- Genres: Ambient pop; experimental pop; art pop; glitch pop; post-industrial
- Length: 36:36
- Label: Baby Halo
- Producers: Trevor Powers; Jason Kingsland (add.); Tim Friesen (add.)

Trevor Powers chronology
Savage Hills Ballroom (2015)	Mulberry Violence (2018)	Capricorn (2020)

Mulberry Violence is the fourth studio album by American musician Trevor Powers, and his first release under his real name. It was released on August 17, 2018, via Baby Halo. Recording sessions took place at Sonic Ranch in Tornillo, Texas. Production was handled entirely by Powers with additional production from Jason Kingsland and Tim Friesen.

== Background ==
The album was written and recorded after Powers' previous project, Youth Lagoon, ended. After Youth Lagoon, Powers began to study classical music theory, jazz and ancient music. Powers then began to craft new music from poetry he had written during his travels throughout Europe, Asia and the United States. He ultimately paired his poems with avant-pop and noise music to create the rough backbone of what would become Mulberry Violence.

The album was recorded at Sonic Ranch, a residential studio complex in Tornillo, Texas. The album was mixed in Los Angeles by Beyoncé collaborator Stuart White, and mastered by Joe LaPorta at Sterling Sound.

=== Album artwork and title ===
While the album artwork for Mulberry Violence was designed by Baptiste Bernazeau, the title for the album was conceived by Powers after a self-proclaimed "internet rabbithole" led him to become fascinated by the ancient symbolism of mulberry trees. As noted in Powers' interview with Matt Connor for Under the Radar magazine, the mulberry tree "has stood as a symbol of patience and wisdom throughout the ages, a symbol of calculated restraint. It is, by all present appearances, a necessary icon for our divided times, a present political state in which basic human dignity is often forgotten". Influenced by this symbolism, Powers' began to draw a comparison between the mulberry and the human race. Noting that, while the mulberry mysticism exists on one spectrum marked by patience and ancient wisdom, "every person ever is on the complete opposite end of that spectrum", an important dichotomy which led Powers to title the project as "Mulberry Violence".

== Promotion and tour ==
A music video for the lead single, "Playwright", was released on April 2, 2018. At the time, Powers had not announced a new album, but rather, presented the video as a representation of the paradoxes that present themselves within each person. A series of "couplets" were later released to promote the new project. "Ache" and "Plaster Saint" were the first coupled singles released, in addition to announcing the new album and a string of new tour dates to promote Mulberry Violence. Powers released two more sets of couplets, "XTQ Idol" and "Dicegame", on June 27, 2018, and "Clad In Skin" and "Squelch" on July 25, 2018, releasing over half of the new material before its First Listen on NPR Music.

== Critical reception ==
Professional ratings
Aggregate scores
Source	Rating
AnyDecentMusic?	6.9/10
Metacritic	73/100
Review scores
Source	Rating
The 405	5.5/10
AllMusic	3.5/5 stars
DIY	4/5 stars
Earbuddy	8.2/10
Exclaim!	7/10
Loud and Quiet	7/10
Northern Transmissions	8/10
Pitchfork	7.4/10
PopMatters	7/10 stars
Q	3/5 stars

Mulberry Violence was met with generally favorable reviews from critics. At Metacritic, which assigns a weighted average rating out of 100 to reviews from mainstream publications, this release received an average score of 73, based on eight reviews. The aggregator AnyDecentMusic? has the critical consensus of the album at a 6.9 out of 10, based on nine reviews. The aggregator Album of the Year assessed the critical consensus as 70 out of 100, based on nine reviews.

Earbuddy reviewer called the album "gorgeous and chaotic". Nick Roseblade of DIY magazine stated, "Trevor Powers has crafted an album full of malice and aggression that it lives up to its title, but it is peppered with themes of hope and optimism". Owen Maxwell of Northern Transmissions said, "For this new record, Powers takes all the conventions we've gotten used to and flips them in bizarre and abrasive ways. Though it can sometimes feel like a little much, Powers rarely goes far enough to stop being catchy". Jayson Greene of Pitchfork said, "Mulberry Violence isn't ugly music by any stretch--all of the bleeding, shrieking noises are undergirded by rich chords, and Powers drops little moments of untouched beauty for us to get our breath". Jenna Mohammed of Exclaim! said, "Powers has found the perfect balance between melodic sounds and a darker aesthetic, making his new creative endeavours come more into focus". Adriane Pontecorvo of PopMatters said, "Mulberry Violence makes it clear that he has the artistic scope and emotional depth to take full advantage of the opportunities he has given himself, and the versatility to keep things very interesting". AllMusic's James Christopher Monger said, "His voice shrouded in distortion, sometimes to the song's detriment, Powers' ability to go from vulnerable to feral in the blink of an eye keeps the listener on the edge of their seat, as does the occasional jarring shift from ambient vista to chemical grade electro-mayhem". Fergal Kinney of Loud and Quiet said, "it's an album of icy electronica, marked by its sonic scarcity as well as its distance from any of his previous output".

In mixed reviews, Jazz Monroe of Q considered this release as "uniquely unhinged". The 405 reviewer said, "Mulberry Violence isn't a letdown because it doesn’t live up to expectations of what a Trevor Powers album is supposed to sound like. It’s a letdown because an immensely talented and creative spirit is struggling to let his instincts speak for themselves".

== Track listing ==
All tracks are written by Trevor Powers.

No.	Title	Length
1.	"XTQ Idol"	5:44
2.	"Dicegame"	4:42
3.	"Pretend It's Confetti"	1:23
4.	"Clad In Skin"	3:04
5.	"Playwright"	4:03
6.	"Film It All"	3:45
7.	"Squelch"	3:30
8.	"Ache"	3:10
9.	"Plaster Saint"	3:11
10.	"Common Hoax"	4:11
Total length:		36:36

== Personnel ==
- Trevor Powers – main artist, songwriter, producer
- Tiffany Emerson – backing vocals, trumpet
- Bonnita Lee – backing vocals
- Nina Figgs – Rhodes piano
- Micah Stevens – additional keyboards, bass, drums
- Kaitlyn Figgs – guitar, additional programming
- Rob Moose – strings
- Rob Burger – additional strings (track 10)
- Richie Figgs – aux percussion
- Jason Kingsland – additional producer, engineering
- Tim Friesen – additional producer (track 6)
- Stuart White – mixing
- Joe LaPorta – mastering
- Baptiste Bernazeau – artwork, design
