= How to Dress Well =

American multimedia artist

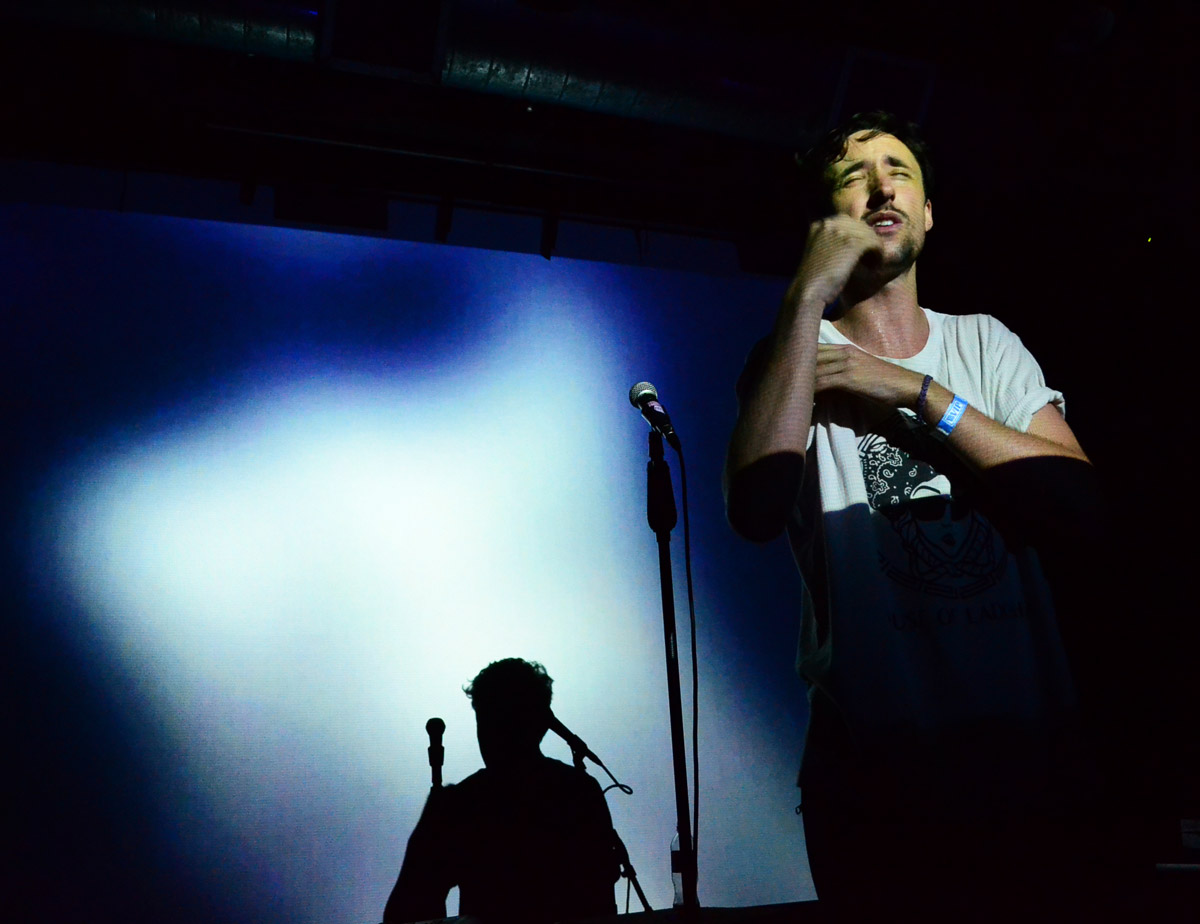
- Krell performing in 2013

Background information
- Born: Tom Krell; Boulder, Colorado, U.S.
- Occupations: Singer-songwriter, producer
- Years active: 2009–present
- Labels: Tri Angle; Domino; Weird World
- Website: howtodresswell.com

How to Dress Well is the stage name of Tom Krell, an American multimedia artist, singer-songwriter, and producer from Boulder, Colorado. He began releasing music independently through his own blog around 2009 and via labels like Tri Angle, Lefse Records, Weird World, and eventually Domino later on in his career.

== Life and career ==
=== Early days ===
Krell was born in Boulder, Colorado. Beginning in 2009, he began to turn out free EPs on his blog, under the name How to Dress Well. He published six EPs in six months. He didn't release his name or his photo, but critics quickly picked up on Krell's music and brought him out of the shadows.

=== Love Remains (2010) ===
How to Dress Well's debut album, Love Remains, was released in 2010 on Lefse in the United States and on Tri Angle in Europe and Asia. The album assembled the best of Krell's early EPs and garnered critical acclaim. It received a score of 8.7 and the "Best New Music" designation from music review site Pitchfork Media. Stereogum recognized How to Dress Well as one of its "40 Best Bands of 2010". Spin gave the album 8 out of 10 stars, calling it "as meditative as it is evocative... conjuring fractured memories of Shai or TLC".

=== Just Once EP (2011) ===
In 2011, How to Dress Well released the Just Once EP—a four-song suite of "Suicide Dream" songs set against a string quartet. The EP collects two previously released tracks bearing the name "Suicide Dream", adds a third with that title, and throws in a new version of "Decisions". The set was inspired by and is dedicated to a friend of Krell's, who died. Limited to 1,000 copies, the 10" vinyl release donated $1 of every record sold to a nonprofit working to raise awareness about mental illness.

=== Total Loss (2012) ===
On the heels of the success of Love Remains, Krell signed a deal with Weird World Records, an imprint of Domino Records. Total Loss was released on September 18, 2012, in North America by Acephale Records and worldwide through Weird World Records. Krell wrote the album over the course of fifteen months or so in Brooklyn, Chicago, Nashville, and London. The album received a "Best New Music" nod from Pitchfork Media, where Ian Cohen wrote that it is "a work of poignant and devastating art". It was also named by Pitchfork as one of the "Top 50 Albums of 2012".

=== "What Is This Heart?" (2014) ===
In April 2014, How to Dress Well released the first single off his forthcoming third studio album, titled "Repeat Pleasure". The album was released on June 23, 2014, via Domino Records / Weird World Records and was well received by music critics, earning an 8.8 and "Best New Music" designation from Pitchfork. Paste Magazine noted that "Krell has managed to indulge his experimental tendencies while at the same time achieve his most accessible sound to date".

Capitalizing on the success of "What Is This Heart?", How to Dress Well embarked on a world tour, beginning in the spring of 2014. The tour started off with shows in Europe and continued on to include stops in the US, Canada, Australia, New Zealand, and cities throughout Asia. The artist performed at a number of major European, North American, and Asian festivals, including Flow Festival, Hostess Club Weekender, and Pitchfork Music Festival.

=== Care (2016) ===
On July 27, 2016, How To Dress Well announced his fourth full-length album, Care. He also released the album's first single, "Lost Youth / Lost You", along with an accompanying music video. On August 30, 2016, How To Dress Well premiered "What's Up" on Zane Lowe's Beats1 show. On September 19, 2016, KCRW's Morning Becomes Eclectic premiered the next single, "Can't You Tell". Care was released on September 23, 2016, on Weird World / Domino Records and was well received by critics. The New York Times commented that the songs on Care "build dreamlike edifices of electronic and acoustic sounds: sometimes anthemic, sometimes danceable" and Stereogum raved "there's the music itself, which is fucking gorgeous, which goes beyond even the levels of gorgeousness that Krell managed on 2014's great "What Is This Heart?" The Line of Best Fit wrote, "Care is as close to a perfect example of modern music as you're likely to find—it's self-reliant, self-assured and packed with more hooks than a cloakroom".

=== The Anteroom (2018) ===
In September 2018, How to Dress Well announced his fifth studio album, The Anteroom. It was created as a 'testament' to a two-year period in his life where he "felt [himself] slipping out of the world and into a cosmic loneliness in which [he] would eventually be dissolved". With the album, he sought to explore the experimental sounds of his early work, as well as influences from the works of Coil, Prurient, Gas, and Grouper. The album was released on October 19.

=== Passing Into | Passing Out (2018) ===
During the summer of 2018, the Getty Center Tram in Los Angeles featured site-specific original musical and sound composition from Krell.

== Discography ==
- Love Remains (2010)
- Total Loss (2012)
- "What Is This Heart?" (2014)
- Care (2016)
- The Anteroom (2018)
- I Am Toward You (2024)
