= Savage Hills Ballroom =

Studio album by Youth Lagoon
- Released: September 25, 2015
- Genre: Art pop; dream pop
- Length: 36:47
- Label: Fat Possum
- Producer: Trevor Powers, Ali Chant

Youth Lagoon chronology
Wondrous Bughouse (2013)	Savage Hills Ballroom (2015)	Heaven is a Junkyard (2023)

Singles from Savage Hills Ballroom
- 1. "The Knower" Released: July 13, 2015; 2. "Highway Patrol Stun Gun" Released: August 10, 2015; 3. "Rotten Human" Released: September 8, 2015

Savage Hills Ballroom is the third studio album by Boise, Idaho-based musician Trevor Powers' Youth Lagoon project. The album was recorded in Bristol, England, and released on September 25, 2015 by Fat Possum Records.

== Background ==
Powers alluded to the fact that the album addressed breaking down barriers and acknowledging personal flaws. He stated in an interview that the album was not named for an actual ballroom: “It’s a mystical place. I think of things in mental images, and while I was working on the album, I pictured this [ballroom]…a place that’s ominous but still inviting. And I needed an appropriate name for that, and ‘Savage Hills Ballroom’ fit," he said.

== Release ==
On July 13, 2015, "The Knower" became the first track to be distributed prior to the album's release; it was issued as a free single-sided 7" single. "Highway Patrol Stun Gun" was subsequently released on August 10 as a music video.

== Critical reception ==
Professional ratings
Aggregate scores
Source	Rating
AnyDecentMusic?	6.6/10
Metacritic	74/100
Review scores
Source	Rating
AllMusic	4/5 stars
Consequence of Sound	B−
DIY	4/5 stars
NOW	3/5 stars
Pitchfork	7.2/10
Q	3/5 stars
Slant	2.5/5 stars
Uncut	4/5 stars
Under the Radar	7.5/10

Savage Hills Ballroom received mostly positive reviews from contemporary music critics. At Metacritic, which assigns a normalized rating out of 100 to reviews from mainstream critics, the album received an average score of 74, based on 10 reviews, which indicates "generally favorable reviews".

Ian Cohen of Pitchfork gave the album a positive review, stating, "Regardless of the subject matter or the production or the arrangements, the most truly self-searching Youth Lagoon album has Powers realizing he perhaps knew his position of strength all along—the inner child set adrift in the adult world, left to figure it out on his own."

== Track listing ==
All tracks are written by Trevor Powers.

No.	Title	Length
1.	"Officer Telephone"	3:02
2.	"Highway Patrol Stun Gun"	4:10
3.	"The Knower"	3:26
4.	"No One Can Tell"	3:51
5.	"Doll's Estate"	3:53
6.	"Rotten Human"	4:28
7.	"Kerry"	3:55
8.	"Again"	3:45
9.	"Free Me"	3:35
10.	"X-Ray"	2:42
Total length:		36:47
