= Love Remains (How to Dress Well album) =

Studio album by How to Dress Well
- Released: October 12, 2010
- Genre: Ambient; lo-fi; alternative R&B
- Length: 38:39
- Label: Lefse Records; Tri Angle

How to Dress Well chronology
Love Remains (2010)	Total Loss (2012)

Professional ratings
Aggregate scores
Source	Rating
AnyDecentMusic?	7.6/10
Metacritic	81/100
Review scores
Source	Rating
AllMusic	4/5 stars
The A.V. Club	A−
Consequence of Sound	3.5/5 stars
Fact	4/5
Now	4/5
Pitchfork	8.7/10
Resident Advisor	4.0/5
Slant Magazine	4/5 stars
Spin	8/10
Uncut	4/5 stars

Love Remains is the debut studio album by How to Dress Well. Pitchfork placed it at number 19 on its list of "The Top 50 Albums of 2010".

== Track listing ==
Love Remains track listing
No.	Title	Length
1.	"You Hold the Water"	2:53
2.	"Ready for the World"	3:48
3.	"My Body"	2:39
4.	"Suicide Dream 2"	4:21
5.	"You Won't Need Me Where I'm Goin'"	2:53
6.	"Can't See My Own Face"	1:56
7.	"Walking This Dumb"	2:56
8.	"Date of Birth"	1:53
9.	"Escape Before the Rain"	3:25
10.	"Endless Rain"	2:32
11.	"Lover's Start"	2:47
12.	"Mr. By & By"	1:56
13.	"Decisions"	2:26
14.	"Suicide Dream 1"	2:14
