= Coexist (disambiguation) =

Coexistence is the property of things existing at the same time and in a proximity close enough to affect each other, without causing harm to one another.

Coexist may also refer to:

- Coexist (album), a 2012 album by The xx
- Coexist (song), 2019 song by Coldrain
- Coexist (organisation), an English charity for interfaith dialogue
- Coexist (image)

== See also ==
- Coexistence (disambiguation)
