= Coexistence (disambiguation) =

Coexistence is the property of things existing at the same time and in a proximity close enough to affect each other, without causing harm to one another.

Coexistence may also refer to:

- Coexistence (political party), Czechoslovak and later Slovak political party
- Peaceful coexistence, Soviet theory regarding relations between the socialist and capitalist blocs, and more generally the coexistence of different states in the international system
- Coexistence of similar species in similar environments; see coexistence theory
- Coexistence of multiple national groups within a polity; see plurinationalism
- COEXISTENCE (exhibition)
- The coexistence type of independent combination of voting systems (mixed electoral system), distinct from parallel voting (superposition) and fusion.

== See also ==
- Coexist (disambiguation)
