= Tension and release =

Tension and release may refer to:

- Consonance and dissonance
- Tension (music)
