= Coexist (album) =

Studio album by the xx
- Released: 5 September 2012
- Recorded: November 2011 – May 2012
- Studio: The xx's studio (London) (Note: The recording location is credited as "Our Studio" in the liner notes.)
- Genre: Indie pop
- Length: 37:11
- Label: Young Turks
- Producer: Jamie Smith

The xx chronology
xx (2009)	Coexist (2012)	I See You (2017)

Singles from Coexist
- 1. "Angels" Released: 17 July 2012; 2. "Chained" Released: 7 August 2012; 3. "Sunset" Released: 28 January 2013; 4. "Fiction" Released: 12 July 2013

Coexist is the second studio album by English indie pop band the xx. It was released 5 September 2012 by the Young Turks record label.

After a break from touring for their 2009 self-titled first album, the xx's band members began to write songs individually before they recorded Coexist from November 2011 to May 2012. For the album, the group drew on personal experiences for their songwriting, while their music was influenced by the electronic dance scene that occurred when they had been away on tour. It was produced by the band's Jamie Smith, who had pursued electronic dance on other projects and developed as a DJ prior to the album.

Coexist features a minimalist musical style with spatial arrangements, loose song structure, minimal variation in dynamics, and experimentation with tension. Its songs are characterised by sparse elements such as simple chord progression, keyboard ostinatos, and fading motifs, while Smith's production incorporates both programmed beats and live percussion instruments. The lyrics, written by guitarist Romy Madley Croft and bassist Oliver Sim, feature inner monologue and simple metaphors to explore a failing relationship and the emotional dynamics of a romance.

The album debuted at number one on the United Kingdom's Official Albums Chart while selling 58,266 copies. It also charted in the top 10 in several other countries and was eventually certified platinum by the Independent Music Companies Association, having sold at least 400,000 copies in Europe. To promote the album, four songs were released as singles, including "Angels" and "Chained", while the xx toured during June to December 2012 throughout Europe and North America. Critically, Coexist was also a success, with several music publications ranking it as one of the year's top-ten albums.

== Background ==
In 2009, the xx released their self-titled debut album to critical acclaim. It was certified platinum in the United Kingdom and also sold 350,000 copies in the United States. It showcased their characteristically moody, R&B and post-dubstep-influenced indie pop style and lyrical themes of loneliness, lust, and love. After the departure of group member Baria Qureshi, the xx exclusively played live concerts throughout 2010, including several high-profile summer music festivals, and garnered a growing fanbase. The band's popularity grew further when their songs featured in television shows and commercials, and they were also covered and sampled by well-known recording artists. In 2010, their debut album won the Mercury Prize, an annual music prize awarded for the best record from the UK and Ireland.

Following an exhausting tour, the xx went on a break. The band's producer and percussionist Jamie Smith pursued electronic dance styles on other musical projects, creating remixes for Radiohead, Adele, and Florence and the Machine. He also collaborated on Gil Scott-Heron's 2011 album We're New Here, and produced Drake's 2012 song "Take Care". The latter exemplified and helped popularise the xx's sound as well. A novice to DJing when starting out with the xx, he subsequently learned its technical aspects and developed a grasp on controlling the crowd through unexpected silences and drops during his live sets.

== Writing and recording ==
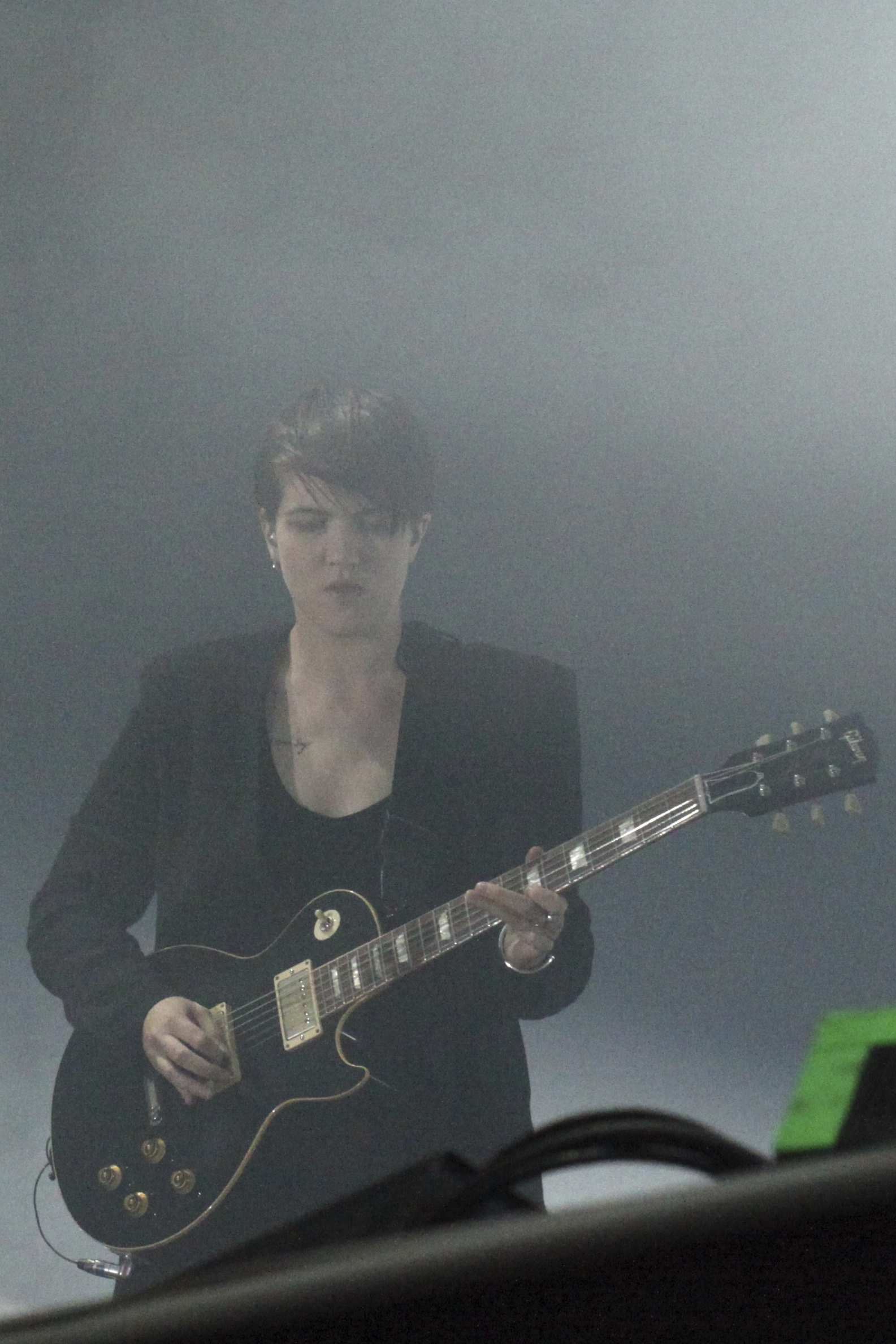
Romy Madley Croft (pictured in 2013) wanted to write more personal lyrics for Coexist.

In 2011, the xx opened their own recording studio in London and began writing songs for Coexist during the summer. Each member—guitarist Romy Madley Croft, bassist Oliver Sim, and Smith—wrote music individually and recorded snippets using GarageBand or their phones. Both Croft and Sim drew on personal experiences and wrote more direct lyrics than on the band's debut to express complex emotions. Sim said of his songwriting for Coexist, "I found myself being a lot less 'moons and stars' and being a lot more literal." Croft felt more expectations from listeners than when the band debuted and consequently turned to more personal songwriting for Coexist:

I was sitting at home knowing people were going to hear us and what they were going to say. But late at night when I was writing things down, I eventually got back to writing about myself. And that's good. Because we've got to sing these songs for a while, so it's really important to feel close to them, to feel like they're real.

They wrote, recorded, and emailed music back and forth to each other before working together in a rehearsal space in East London. When he first read them, Smith found Croft and Sim's lyrics to be "purposely ambiguous so people can relate to them", saying in an interview for Uncut, "I mean... if I listen carefully, I do know about their lives intimately so I can guess what they're about. But they don't even tell each other what they're singing about."

The xx started recording Coexist in November 2011, and used a photography studio in North London to record the songs they had put together. They later used the rehearsal space in East London to practice playing the songs live. They recorded for six months in London and intended to finish before their scheduled music festival appearances for 2012. The xx's direction for the album was partly inspired by the electronic dance scene that occurred while they toured for their first album, as well as the live DJ sets of Smith, who was mostly listening to dark Chicago house music at the time. According to him, "We left [to tour] when we were 17 and we missed out on that chunk of our lives when everyone else was partying." However, he insisted that "we're not looking to make people dance." They were also influenced by pop-reggae band UB40, folk act White Hinterland, and neo soul artist Van Hunt, all of whom they listened to while recording Coexist. Croft viewed the music as a continuation of their debut, "developed, but [not] like completely a world away".

Rather than expand on their debut's sound, the xx wanted to minimise the songs they recorded for Coexist and mute certain elements during its production. Croft felt that this would help make the music more playable live instead of having to reproduce multiple vocal or guitar elements that were tracked onto a song. Smith, who produced and mixed Coexist, wanted to keep his production simple and create an emotive, electronic sound. He used Logic Pro recording software, a Space Echo effects unit, preamplifiers, and Casiotones on occasion, as well as both synthesised steelpan sounds and live percussion instruments. To engineer the album, he put together a mixing desk from pieces of other desks and left doors open during the recording to let sounds from outside the studio bleed into the mix. The xx finished recording Coexist in May 2012.

== Musical style ==
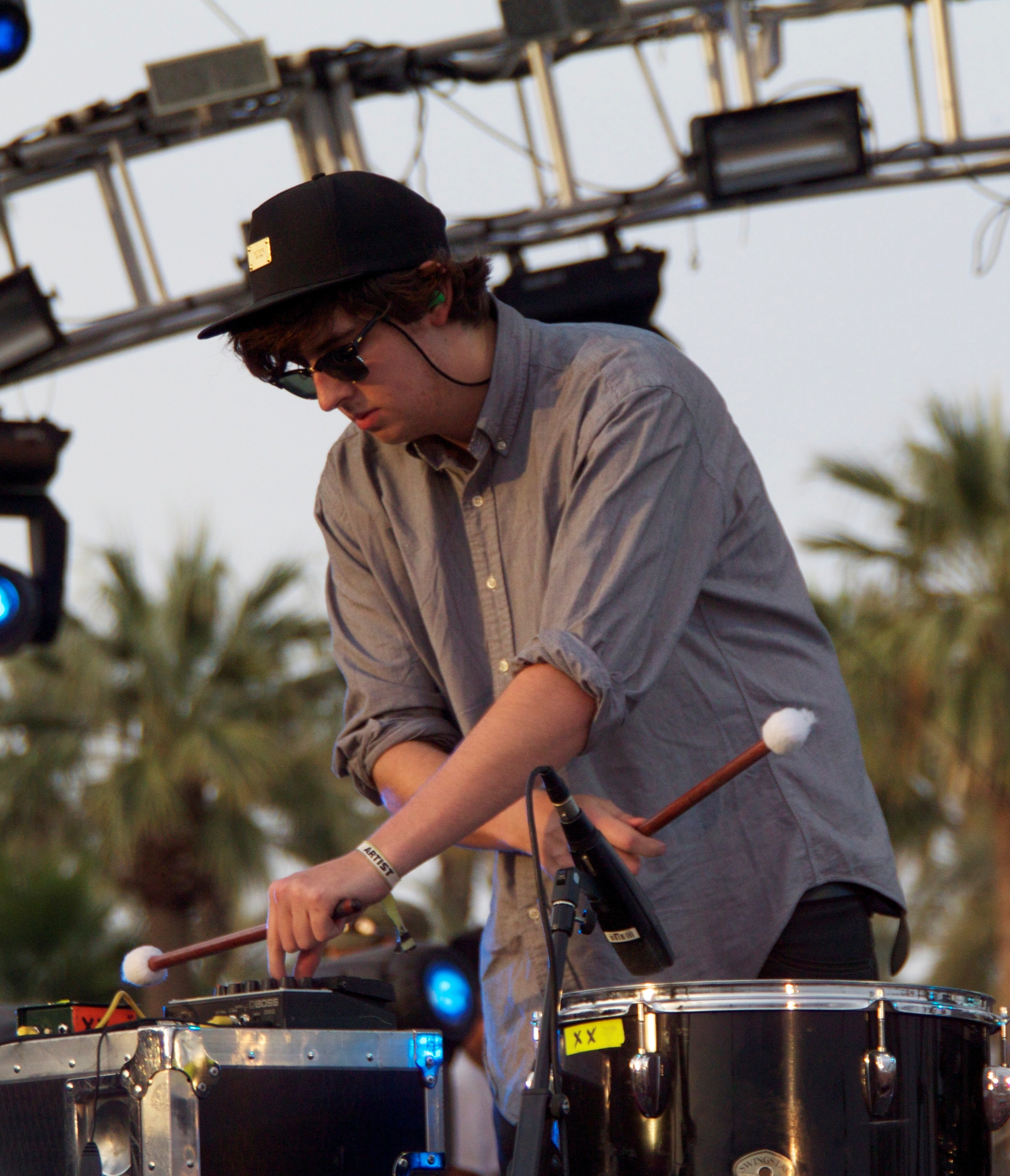
Jamie Smith (pictured) drew inspiration from his live DJ sets while producing Coexist.

The songs on Coexist, which Edna Gundersen of USA Today categorised as indie pop, eschew melodic structure for minimalist dynamics and sparse sounds. John Calvert of Fact asserts that it is "a far more meditative album" for deviating from its predecessor's "tight, brisk pop songs", "nuanced [guitar] interplay", and "light dynamics". Jon Caramanica of The New York Times comments that songs "unfold ... beginning as pointillist sketches and ending up as huge, blurry color blocks." Reflecting the band's electronic dance influences, Coexist features atmospheric, dance-orientated song structures, deemphasises traditional verse-chorus form, and incorporates influences from dubstep and rave music. Drowned in Sound's Hayden Woolley writes that the music features "watercolour textures and rhythms that seem to lock-in to the ebbing pulse and cadences of the body." Rory Gibb of The Quietus believes that Coexist is neither a "pop" nor "downtempo dance record", but occupies "a hazy space between the two" and is an attempt at "post-Burial pop". Simon Price of The Independent asserts that "rather than clubland, Coexist owes a debt to comedown/chillout culture".

The songs are characterised by droning harmonies, simple chord progression, keyboard ostinatos, ringing guitar, resounding reverb, slight bass grooves, and programmed beats. Sim plays counterpoint melodies on his bass, while Croft plays angular figures, sketchy musical patterns, and melodies developed from two-note intervals; Price likens Croft's use of the guitar to playing a harp. Smith's production is largely responsible for the music's lowest frequency sounds and incorporates both four on the floor and 2-step beats, subtle BPM changes, heartbeat-like drum machine rhythms, strings, and live percussion such as timpani, snare drums, and steelpans. The latter instrument is played in arpeggio and exhibits Jamaican music influences. Critic Will Hermes views Smith as a more prominent contributor on Coexist than on the debut album and comments that "the beats and musical backdrops are more varied and command more attention."

The songs are also spatially arranged and experiment with tension, including listeners' expectations for a hook to unfold, a dance beat to develop, and a time signature to change. Elements such as drum beats, vocals, and guitar motifs fade to silence throughout the songs. Kitty Empire of The Observer comments that "no pattern here hangs around for more than a couple of bars, and rarely in multiples of four." Stephen Thompson of NPR comments on the music's lack of dynamism, writing that the band "lets its songs billow out softly and quietly, with only achingly pretty guitar lines to lessen the tension." Michael Hann of The Guardian writes that the album refines the band's "already skeletal frame" and that most of its songs are "defined as much by space as by sound", adding that the music's "gaps bring greater emphasis" to guitar, piano, and vocal elements. Melissa Locker of Time comments that "each sound, be it instrument or voice, is given ample room to exist and to soar."

== Lyrics and themes ==
Croft and Sim echo each other across the album, never quite duetting, more like two people singing their own versions of the same story ... both aching with regret.

— Michael Hann (The Guardian, 2012)

Coexist deals with themes of heartbreak, loneliness, and intimacy. Croft and Sim share lead vocals, which occasionally overlap in call and response interplay and slow crescendos. Sim, who cites Sade as an influence, has more assured vocals, while Croft sings in a shyer style and exhibits catches in her voice. The lyrics focus on a failing relationship and changes in a romance. Will Ryan of Beats Per Minute writes that they follow "the back-and-forth complexities of a fractured relationship that ... explores a wilderness of residual feelings left over after said relationship has collapsed." Garry Mulholland of Uncut interprets the album to be "the story of a relationship broken by the protagonists' tendency to love too much while being unable to express their need to each other." Eric Sundermann of The A.V. Club views that the album's songs "all focus on different stages of romantic love, from infatuation to frustration to all the other stuff that falls in between." Kevin Liedel of Slant Magazine felt that the songs follow-up on the "lovebirds" from the xx's debut album, "now separated and devastated ... mus[ing] on what went wrong". Puja Patel of Spin remarks that the band's "fantastical, elemental star-crossed-lover talk has been replaced by evocations of a harder, more aggressively worked-at love". Most of the songs have single-word titles that evoke long sentiments.

The xx's lyrics on Coexist feature broader diction than on the xx's first record and employ simple metaphors of light and darkness, and distance and time. They often express emotional stress, yearning, and passive-aggressive attitudes. Some songs feature a lyrical conceit of an emotionally elusive lover as an apparition or an illusion. Croft and Sim avoid traditional duet lyrics about declarations of love, instead employing inner monologues to depict the same situation from two different perspectives. Eric Sundermann asserts that, rather than "simply" being "declarations", the songs serve as "the thought process of how to deal with interpersonal struggles." Neil McCormick of The Daily Telegraph perceives "intimate conversations between forlorn lovers" and an "almost sacred eroticism in Croft and Sim's whispery vocals." Drowned in Sound's Hayden Woolley views that the album shares its predecessor's "fragility", "quiet gravitas", and "heavy words", but is "an intensely wind-torn and wounded album that cuts even deeper than its predecessor." Music journalist Luke Turner calls its subject matter more "turbulent, sensual and fun" than on the group's first album and states, "of course not necessarily a sexual or romantic one, the feel of this second record is far more earthy, sticky, complicated, like the tension of the second or third encounters after a one night stand."

== Songs ==
"Reunion"
"Reunion" incorporates an atypical musical element—a hypnotic steel drum by Smith, who reworked his bandmates' simpler demo of the song.

"Angels" opens Coexist with a restrained style and soft-spoken verses about the idea of being in love. Croft's lyrics compare the premature end of a relationship to "dreaming of angels, and leaving without them", and touch on the private knowledge that is acquired through intimacy. "Chained" experiments with musical buildup and subtle flourishes, and muffled 2-step beats. Its lyrics lament a couple's distance from each other. On "Fiction", Sim's emotive lyrics recount romantic illusions such as "last night the world was beneath us", but eventually lead to a catharsis. "Try" has oscillating guitar lines, sluggish snare drums, and looped synthesizers. Smith experimented with unconventional electronic elements when producing the song. John Calvert of Fact asserts that it is a stark "conflation of urban and indie music", noting its "portomento [sic] synths and rumble-bass (think 'Drop It Like It's Hot') passing under tremolo guitar." On "Try", the narrators attempt to evoke feelings of hope and functionality to each other.

"Reunion" is a noirish ballad that features reactive emotions by the narrators. Smith approached its recording as he would remixing a song, working with a demo of bass, guitar, and vocal parts at his own studio and incorporating house and techno elements. Midway, "Reunion" develops a refrain of "did I ... see you ... see me ... in a new light?", and pulsating steel drums lead to a somber, rhythmic dance section. Its pulsating beat transitions into "Sunset", a song about the pain shared by estranged ex-lovers. The song's muted beat adds tension to the narrative, which Calvert interprets to be "the couple's final farewell – the beat serves to denote the passing of time." "Sunset" also has a subtle UK garage beat, funky house elements, and was inspired by the music from Smith's DJing gigs; Croft cited it as "an example of the idea of a kind of song we're all really into, which is heartbreaking dance music". Consequence of Sound's Harley Brown views that "Reunion" and "Sunset" make up a congruous mix at "the heart of the album", as Smith "indie-streams these house varieties ... slowing down and alienating beats from their context so they're even more universal, unobscured by their dance floor origins."

"Swept Away"
"Swept Away" has anticlimactic dynamics with downtempo dance and pop elements. According to Pitchfork, it is the most dance-influenced song on Coexist.

"Missing" features a melancholic mood and experiments with echoing vocal effects. The song's lyrics express inner turmoil and deal with themes of separation and isolation. Sim sings lead over Croft's echoed background wails, and vice versa, amid solemn keyboard flourishes. Sim originally wrote the song on the band's tour bus near the end of their tour, but underwent several changes before being one of the last songs recorded for the album. "Tides" opens solely with Croft and Sim's vocals, and features fading musical elements, including lock-step percussion, minor strings, an isolated guitar line, and a wavy bassline. Croft and Sim trade lines expressing resignation as their respective partner "leav[es] with the tide", comparing the ebb and flow of a relationship to that of tides.

The album's subsequent songs focus on separation, with lyrics written in past tense. "Unfold" comprises individual notes and pauses, and incorporates tension in its off-beat composition, while its percussion increases in tempo before the accompanying instrumentation follows suit. It features deep house beats, resounding guitar harmonics, rhythmic hi-hat, and a dominant breakbeat. Croft describes "Unfold" as a "gentle reverie" and "quite an emotional one." On "Swept Away", she and Sim express fragile declarations of love. They originally wrote the song as a ballad before Smith reworked it with a Roland TR-909 drum machine. "Our Song" features a rewinding guitar sample, looped feedback, and pulsating percussion buildup. It is about the love shared in a friendship; Croft and Sim wrote it to address each other and the band itself: "We've never done that before; we're always addressing the songs outward. It's about the function of love and the love of friends. It's important."

== Title and packaging ==
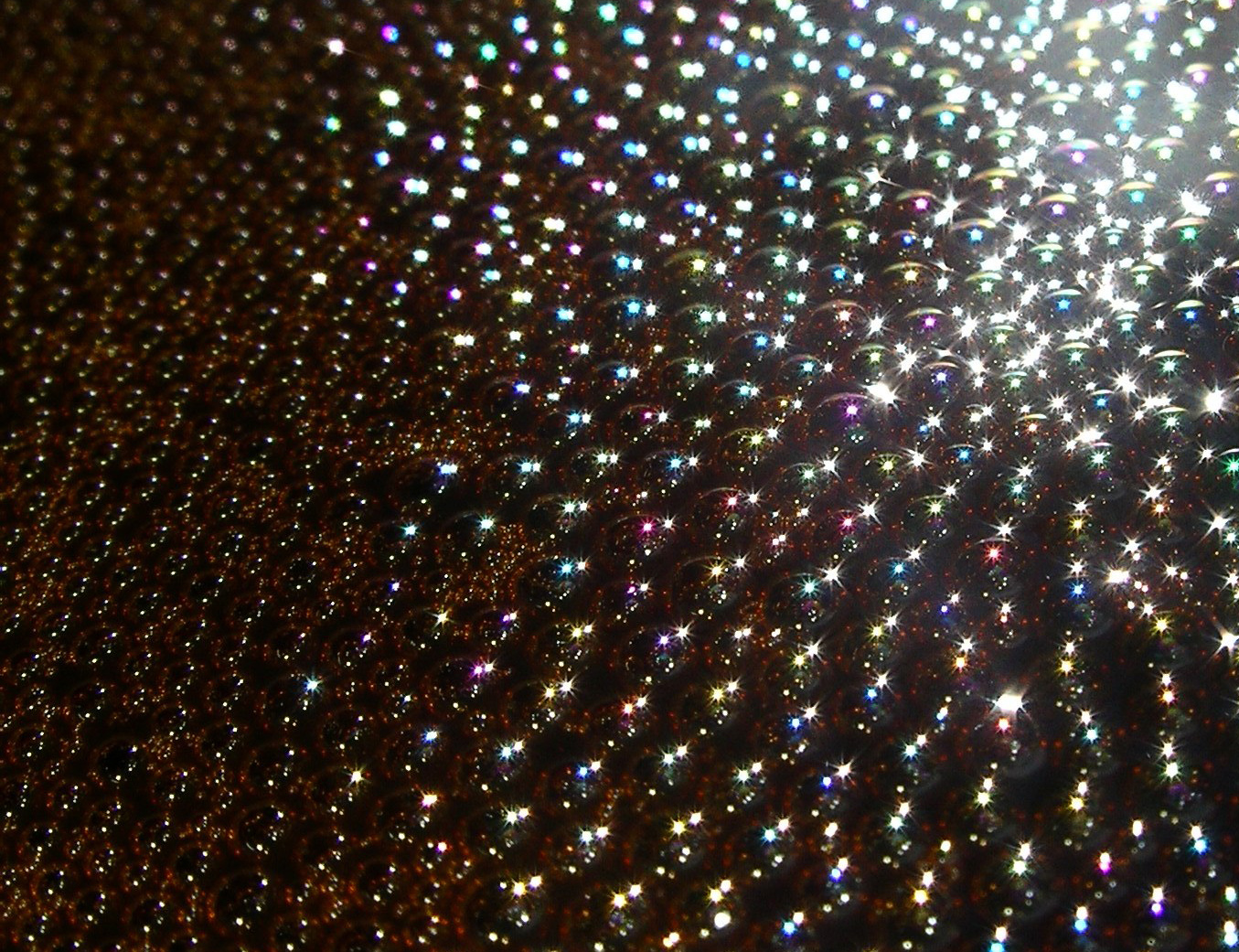
The album's title was inspired by the colours visible in iridescent oil (pictured).

The album's title was inspired by their idea for the cover artwork, which depicts an iridescent oil spill in the shape of an "X", a variation on the band's white-on-black "X" logo. Croft compared the mixture of oil and water to her holistic view of the band, saying in an interview for Grantland:

You see a puddle of petrol on the floor – it can look sort of beautiful with the colors that come through it. I looked it up on Google or whatever, and it said oil and water don't mix, they peacefully coexist? And that's what it is when you see those colors. I liked that idea: those two things coming together to make something more beautiful than they are. And I liked the idea of us three coming together; only when the three of us are together, that's when it exists.

When they informed them of the title, their record label's American office e-mailed them about there being a "Coexist" bumper sticker. Croft said that "I know it has that connection, but it felt like the right word. It's cool, I guess? It's a nice message? Everybody getting along?"

== Marketing and sales ==
Coexist was released worldwide by Young Turks. In May 2012, the xx played three intimate shows in London, where they previewed material from the album. They also performed on the Mini Stage of the San Miguel Primavera Sound festival in Barcelona, Spain, on 31 May. On 17 July, "Angels" was released as the album's lead single. It charted at number 46 in Australia and at number 38 in Belgium. The second single, "Chained", was released on 7 August. On 28 September, the xx performed the song, along with "Sunset", on Later... with Jools Holland. A remix of the song was released as a single to iTunes on 11 March 2013. "Sunset" was later serviced to American modern rock radio on 28 January 2013.

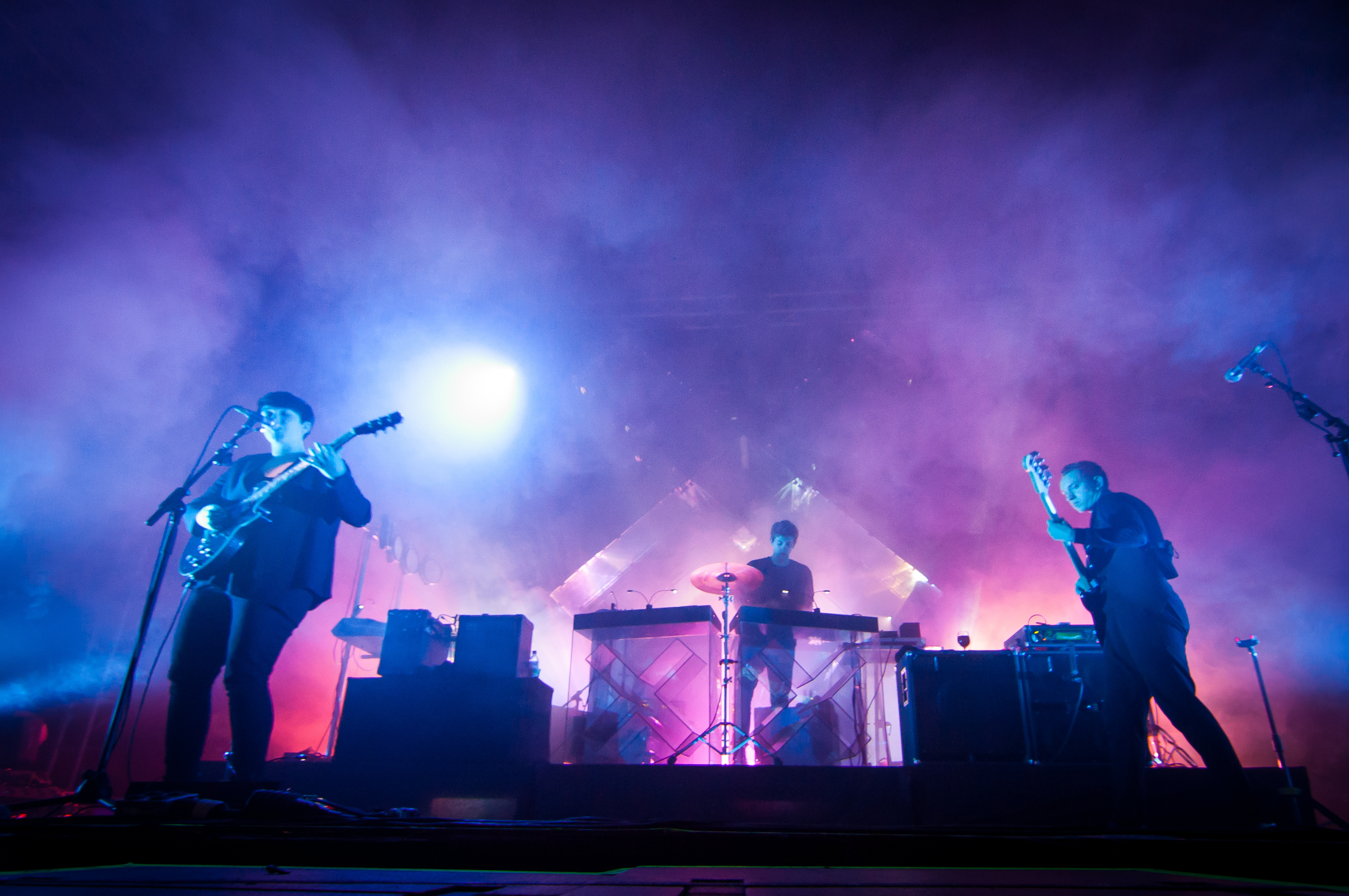
The xx performing at the Ilosaarirock Festival in Finland in July 2012

To test if the xx could replicate their debut album's viral success, Young Turks' parent label XL Recordings approached technology companies and agreed to a deal with Microsoft to create a visualisation that could track sharing of the album's stream. The xx collaborated with designers from Internet Explorer and 9elements on the project. It was designed to show lines on a global map as Coexist is shared and was inspired by media artist Aaron Koblin's visualisation of flight patterns in the US. The album's stream was posted on a host site upon its release and shared with a fan in London through Facebook. The stream's host site crashed within 24 hours after the stream had been shared with millions of users. It subsequently reached social news site Reddit, where fans campaigned to share the album to every country possible. Label executive Adam Farrell of Beggars Group, Young Turks' distributor, cited it as "one of the most significant album premieres we've ever done".

Coexist debuted at number one on the Official Albums Chart with first-week sales of 58,266 copies in the United Kingdom, becoming the band's first number-one album on the chart. The album fell to number four in its second week, selling 22,005 copies. On 14 September 2012, the album was certified gold by the British Phonographic Industry, denoting shipments in excess of 100,000 copies in the UK, and later in 2022, it was certified platinum. Coexist also debuted at number one on record charts in Belgium, New Zealand, Portugal, and Switzerland. In the United States, it debuted at number five on the Billboard 200 with 73,000 copies sold in its first week. The album debuted at number two on the Canadian Albums Chart, selling 10,000 copies in its first week.

In June 2012, the xx embarked on a 25-date, international summer tour. The tour lasted into September and featured performances at several music festivals, including Primavera Sound, Rock Werchter, Sziget Festival, Lowlands, Bestival, and Electric Picnic. On 23 July, they debuted "Swept Away", "Sunset", and "Reunion" at the Music Box in Los Angeles. Unlike the band's last tour, Smith added live percussion instruments to his repertoire. In December, the xx played a five-date tour in the United Kingdom—Brighton Dome on 6 December, O2 Academy Newcastle on 11 December, Wolverhampton Civic Hall on 12 December, Colston Hall on 14 December, and Brixton Academy on 16 December.

In 2014, Coexist was awarded a platinum certification from the Independent Music Companies Association, indicating sales of at least 400,000 copies throughout Europe.

== Critical reception ==
Professional ratings
Aggregate scores
Source	Rating
AnyDecentMusic?	7.8/10
Metacritic	79/100
Review scores
Source	Rating
AllMusic	3.5/5 stars
The Daily Telegraph	4/5 stars
The Guardian	4/5 stars
The Independent	3/5 stars
MSN Music (Expert Witness)	A−
NME	8/10
Pitchfork	7.5/10
Rolling Stone	3.5/5 stars
Spin	8/10
USA Today	3.5/4 stars

Coexist was met with generally positive reviews from critics. At Metacritic, which assigns a normalised rating out of 100 to reviews from mainstream publications, the album received an average score of 79, based on 46 reviews. Aggregator AnyDecentMusic? gave it 7.8 out of 10, based on their assessment of the critical consensus.

Reviewing in October 2012 for Uncut, Garry Mulholland called the album a "masterpiece" of conceptually identical but "stronger, deeper, better" music when compared to the xx's debut. In Rolling Stone, Jody Rosen hailed the band as "masters of restraint", while Chicago Tribune critic Greg Kot felt that the album "functions as a near-perfect mood piece" and, "because there are so few elements in each song," each sound "makes a bigger impact." Writing for The Daily Telegraph, Neil McCormick praised Smith for "somehow widening and deepening the sound without intruding", and Puja Patel from Spin credited him for "both stretching and magnifying the gritty beauty of his vocalists". In MSN Music, Robert Christgau applauded the group's preoccupation with "young love" and stated, "these scrupulously abstract verses capture its obsessive doubts and fragile exaltations with delicacy and tenderness." Michael Alan Goldberg of The Village Voice called the album "gorgeous" and said that the music is like a "haiku instead of sonnet; Hemingway rather than Fitzgerald, with meaning and emotion lurking beneath the surface." Simon Price found the group's take on the duet concept highly engaging and emotional while deeming Coexist a greater work than their debut album.

Some reviewers were less enthusiastic. Andy Gill of The Independent believed that the band's songs had taken on "raging emotions" lacking on their debut and making Coexist a worthy but occasionally "uneasy listening". The New York Times critic Jon Caramanica said the record suffers from a difficult second half on what is otherwise "as insular and micro as ambitious pop music can be ... a wonderful experiment in the power of absence." Arnold Pan from PopMatters was more critical, calling it monotonous and "an exercise in delayed gratification", while Randall Roberts of the Los Angeles Times panned the lyrics as "one-dimensional planes floating through the group's oft-glorious 3-D spaces".

Several critics and publications ranked Coexist as one of 2012's best albums in their year-end, top-ten lists, including Kitty Empire of The Observer, The Austin Chronicle, Les Inrockuptibles, State magazine, and The Guardian, whose staff voted it eighth. It was named the 14th best album of the year by both NME magazine and Christgau in his list for The Barnes & Noble Review. However, the magazine XLR8R ranked the album number seven on their list of the most overrated releases of the year, feeling that the trio's dark and minimal sound on the record was not as exciting as on their debut LP.

== Track listing ==
All lyrics are written by Oliver Sim and Romy Madley Croft, except where noted; all music is composed by Jamie Smith, Sim and Croft.

No.	Title	Length
1.	"Angels" (lyrics by Croft)	2:51
2.	"Chained" (contains a sample of "Lilies of the Nile" as performed by The Crusaders)	2:47
3.	"Fiction" (lyrics by Sim)	2:56
4.	"Try"	3:15
5.	"Reunion"	3:57
6.	"Sunset"	3:38
7.	"Missing"	3:33
8.	"Tides"	3:01
9.	"Unfold"	3:02
10.	"Swept Away"	4:59
11.	"Our Song"	3:13
Total length:		37:11

Japanese edition bonus track
No.	Title	Length
12.	"Reconsider"	3:46

== Personnel ==
Credits adapted from the liner notes of Coexist.

The xx

- Romy Madley Croft – art direction, guitar, keyboards (on "Chained"), vocals
- Oliver Sim – bass, synthesiser (on "Fiction"), vocals
- Jamie Smith – beats, engineering, mixing, MPC, organ (on "Try" and "Reunion"), piano (on "Fiction" and "Swept Away"), production, steel pans (on "Reunion")
- The xx – design

Additional personnel

- Sarah Chapman – strings (on "Tides")
- Charlotte Eksteen – strings (on "Tides")
- David Evans – photography
- Phil Lee – art direction, design
- Rodaidh McDonald – mixing
- Mandy Parnell – mastering
- Ivo Stankov – strings (on "Tides")
- James Underwood – strings (on "Tides")

== Charts ==
=== Weekly charts ===
Chart (2012–2014)	Peak position
Australian Albums (ARIA)	2
Austrian Albums (Ö3 Austria)	3
Belgian Albums (Ultratop Flanders)	1
Belgian Albums (Ultratop Wallonia)	3
Canadian Albums (Billboard)	2
Chinese Albums (Sino Chart)	13
Danish Albums (Hitlisten)	5
Dutch Albums (Album Top 100)	4
Dutch Alternative Albums (MegaCharts)	2
Finnish Albums (Suomen virallinen lista)	6
French Albums (SNEP)	2
German Albums (Offizielle Top 100)	3
Irish Albums (IRMA)	3
Irish Independent Albums (IRMA)	1
Italian Albums (FIMI)	6
Japanese Albums (Oricon)	53
Mexican Albums (Top 100 Mexico)	52
New Zealand Albums (RMNZ)	1
Norwegian Albums (VG-lista)	6
Polish Albums (ZPAV)	14
Portuguese Albums (AFP)	1
Scottish Albums (OCC)	3
Spanish Albums (Promusicae)	5
Swedish Albums (Sverigetopplistan)	4
Swiss Albums (Schweizer Hitparade)	1
UK Albums (OCC)	1
UK Independent Albums (OCC)	1
US Billboard 200	5
US Independent Albums (Billboard)	1
US Top Alternative Albums (Billboard)	1
US Top Rock Albums (Billboard)	4

=== Year-end charts ===
Chart (2012)	Position
Australian Albums (ARIA)	84
Belgian Albums (Ultratop Flanders)	11
Belgian Albums (Ultratop Wallonia)	75
Danish Albums (Hitlisten)	82
Dutch Albums (MegaCharts)	94
French Albums (SNEP)	92
German Albums (Offizielle Top 100)	80
Swiss Albums (Schweizer Hitparade)	59
UK Albums (OCC)	59
US Billboard 200	187
US Independent Albums (Billboard)	19
US Top Alternative Albums (Billboard)	31
US Top Rock Albums (Billboard)	51

Chart (2013)	Position
Belgian Albums (Ultratop Flanders)	82
UK Albums (OCC)	133
US Independent Albums (Billboard)	31

== Certifications ==
Region	Certification	Certified units/sales
Belgium (BRMA)	Gold	15,000^{*}
Canada (Music Canada)	Gold	40,000^{^}
Denmark (IFPI Danmark)	Gold	10,000^{‡}
Germany (BVMI)	Gold	100,000^{‡}
New Zealand (RMNZ)	Gold	7,500^{‡}
United Kingdom (BPI)	Platinum	266,239
^{*} Sales figures based on certification alone.^{^} Shipments figures based on certification alone.^{‡} Sales+streaming figures based on certification alone.

== Release history ==
Region	Date	Label
Japan	5 September 2012	Hostess
Australia	7 September 2012	Young Turks
Ireland	7 September 2012	Young Turks
Germany	7 September 2012	Young Turks; XL
France	10 September 2012	XL
Poland	10 September 2012	XL
United Kingdom	10 September 2012	Young Turks
United States	11 September 2012	Young Turks
Italy	11 September 2012	XL

== See also ==
- List of Irish Independent Albums Chart number-one albums of 2012
- List of number-one albums in 2012 (New Zealand)
- List of number-one hits of 2012 (Switzerland)
- List of UK Albums Chart number ones of the 2010s
