= Chained (The xx song) =

Single by The xx

from the album Coexist
- Released: 7 August 2012
- Recorded: Our Studio, London
- Genre: Indie pop
- Length: 2:47
- Label: Young Turks
- Songwriter(s): Romy Madley Croft, Oliver Sim
- Producer(s): Jamie xx

The xx singles chronology
"Angels" (2012)	"Chained" (2012)	"Sunset" (2013)

"Chained" is a song by English indie pop group The xx, released on 7 August 2012 by Young Turks. It was the second single from their 2012 album Coexist. The song was produced by percussionist Jamie xx and written by guitarist Romy Madley Croft and bassist Oliver Sim.

"Chained" charted at number 19 in Belgium and received positive reviews from music critics, who complimented Jamie xx's minimalist production and the vocal interplay between Croft and Sim.

== Writing and recording ==
"Chained" was one of the first songs written for Coexist. Romy Madley Croft and Oliver Sim wrote the song together in a room with her playing keyboards and him playing bass. After they finished writing it, Jamie xx incorporated his beat to the song, which Croft said "took the song on a complete different turn". They recorded the song at their studio in London.

== Music and lyrics ==
The song is a lament of a couple's distance from each other: "Did I hold you too tight? / Did I not let enough light in? ... We used to be closer than this / Is it something you miss?" Croft and Sim finish each other's lines through their interplay on the song. Hari Ashurst of Pitchfork Media views their vocal interplay as "duelling" and writes, "The two vocalists swoop and duck around each other's verses, almost as if they're avoiding each other. Sometimes, they hit the same slipstream, but more often [Croft] and Oliver are singing over each other, trailing off alone, or simply trading wistful lines." He cites the chorus line as the sole moment of release on the song.

Its music features subtle flourishes, cooing sounds, a brief guitar solo, and muffled 2-step beats. Jamie xx's minimalist production incorporates shimmering cymbals and syncopated rimshots. "Chained" experiments with musical buildup, including climactic guitar and rising beats. The song's only crescendo is by a solitary guitar line, and the stuttering, off-beat kick drum that beings the song develops into a more standard rhythm. Paula Mejia of Prefix writes that the song "carefully structures itself on the formulaic build of beats, rising like the pace of a palpitating heartbeat and bursting into a shimmer of oscillating sounds". The song also contains a sample of The Crusaders' 1974 song "Lilies of the Nile".

== Critical reception ==
Pitchfork Media's Hari Ashurst called the song "an intense pinprick of drama" and complimented Croft and Sim's "intense" vocal interplay, writing that "the thrill is emotional and brave". Heather Phares of AllMusic cited it as a highlight on Coexist and commented that "they share an intimacy that makes listeners feel like they're eavesdropping." Will Hermes of Rolling Stone gave the song four out of five stars and praised Jamie xx's "sleight-of-hand minimalism", writing that "at present he may be the most elegant beatmaker in pop."

== Track listing ==
Digital download
No.	Title	Writer(s)	Producer	Length
1.	"Chained"	Romy Madley Croft, Oliver Sim	Jamie xx	2:47

== Personnel ==
Credits adapted from Coexist liner notes.

- Romy Madley Croft – composer, guitar, keyboards, vocals
- Rodaidh McDonald – mixing
- Oliver Sim – bass, composer, vocals
- Mandy Parnell – mastering
- Jamie Smith – beats, engineer, mixing, MPC, producer

== Charts ==
Chart (2012)	Peak position
Belgium (Ultratip Bubbling Under Flanders)	19
UK Indie (OCC)	44

== Release history ==
Date	Label
7 August 2012	Young Turks
