= Etgar =

Etgar is a Jewish given name and surname. Notable people with the name include:

- Etgar Keret (born 1967), Israeli writer
- Raphie Etgar (born 1947), Israeli artist and curator

== See also ==
- Edgar
