= Angels (The xx song) =

Single by The xx

from the album Coexist
- Released: 17 July 2012
- Recorded: Our Studio, London
- Genre: Indie pop
- Length: 2:51
- Label: Young Turks
- Songwriters: Romy Madley Croft; Oliver Sim; Jamie Smith
- Producer: Jamie xx

The xx singles chronology
"VCR" (2010)	"Angels" (2012)	"Chained" (2012)

"Angels" is a song by English indie pop group The xx, released as a digital download on 17 July 2012 by Young Turks. It was the lead single for their 2012 album Coexist. The song was written by guitarist Romy Madley Croft, bassist Oliver Sim, and percussionist Jamie xx, who also produced it.

The xx premiered the song on 14 May 2012 at their first live show since touring in 2010. Upon its release, "Angels" received positive reviews from music critics, who commended Croft's performance and the song's minimalist musical style. The song was remixed by electronic musician Four Tet, whose version was aired on BBC Radio on 19 September.

Was used as an interlude for the On the Run Tour recorded concert performance.

== Writing and recording ==
"Angels" was recorded during the sessions for Coexist at The xx's recording studio in London. Its demo was originally recorded solely by Romy Madley Croft, who wrote the song's lyrics. Jamie xx said of the song's recording in an interview for Spin, "It took a while to work out how to arrange it for the band. The demo was quite perfect, but it was just Romy. It took the entire length of the recording process to get it right."

== Music and lyrics ==
"Angels"
Croft's hushed expressions of devotion are complemented by a low rumble, sparse drums, and simple guitar lines.

"Angels" is a sparsely-produced, gentle ballad about the idea of being in love. It has a measured pace and features slight vocals and whispered cadences by Croft, background baritone bass, subtle drum thuds, and coiling guitar lines. Pitchfork Media's Larry Fitzmaurice observes on the song "lots of hollow space surrounding [that] add[s] intimacy." "Angels" opens with echoey guitar and Romy's vocals, which are at the front of the mix. Eerie snare rolls appear within a minute of the song, but quickly fade away. Arnold Pan of PopMatters writes that, in the context of Coexist, the song has its "own sense of development" and "resolution". Oliver Sim said of this moment of tension in the song, "Early on, Jamie said something about the album being inspired by dance music, so everyone's expecting a house beat to drop halfway through—which is hilarious because this is not a dance record."

Croft's transparent lyrics express lovesick emotion, adoration, and private knowledge acquired from intimacy: "You move through the room / Like breathing was easy / If someone believed me / They would be as in love with you as I am". They also compare a relationship that ended prematurely to "dreaming of angels, and leaving without them". Her repetition of "love" in the song's chorus expresses the depth and intensity of the narrator's feeling. Priya Elan of NME opines that she repeats the word "like she's been sucker-punched by the sheer intensity of her heart-shaped feeling. She's revelling in the joy of it, but also realising the utter failure of the simple four-letter word to express the depth of what she's experiencing." Croft said that the song is "very positive lyrically" and that its album "goes through a few different stages, and this would be the lightest." Puja Patel of Spin characterizes its subject matter as "loverlorn" and observes a balance "between honest[y], gut-wrenching desire and stalker-like idolization".

== Live performances ==
The xx premiered the song at Electrowerkz in Islington, London on 14 May 2012, their first live show since 2010. They subsequently performed "Angels" on Conan on 24 July.

== Reception ==
Pitchfork Media's Larry Fitzmaurice noted the song's "percussive touch" as an indication that "the xx are changing ... slowly and subtly, two characteristics that's always been part of their central appeal." Siân Rowe of NME called it "a heart-meltingly perfect follow-on from their debut", and the magazine's Priya Elan dubbed it "the boldest Valentine the band have ever recorded." Michael Cragg of The Guardian commented that "their ability to make minimalism seem warm and comforting [is] still intact." Allmusic's Heather Phares called the song a "lovely album opener" and wrote that the band's "elegantly serpentine guitars — which recalled the Cure and Durutti Column on xx ... are now entirely their own". The Quietus critiqued that "it feels a bit more confident; where Oliver Sim and Madley-Croft's wordplay on their debut was tentative, there's a newfound directness". Brendan Frank of Beats Per Minute commended Croft for "delivering a simple love note to an anonymous recipient," adding that "she does a magnificent job of carrying the piece on her own." Stephen Thompson of NPR called "Angels" a "gentle love song made all the more disarming for its simplicity," writing that it "ratchets up the tension using the fewest possible ingredients." In Australia, the song was voted by members of the public to number 19 on Triple J Hottest 100 of 2012.

== Cover versions ==
In 2012, British band Bastille covered "Angels" alongside TLC's "No Scrubs" in a mash-up entitled "No Angels". The mash-up featured as one of eleven tracks on the band's second mixtape, Other People's Heartache, Pt. 2. Lou Rhodes performed an acoustic cover of the song in 2014.

== Track listing ==
Digital download
No.	Title	Writer(s)	Producer	Length
1.	"Angels"	Romy Madley Croft; Oliver Sim; Jamie Smith	Jamie xx	2:51

== Personnel ==
Credits adapted from Coexist liner notes.

- Romy Madley Croft – composer, guitar, vocals
- Oliver Sim – bass, composer
- Jamie Smith – beats, composer, engineer, mixing, MPC, producer
- Rodaidh McDonald – mixing
- Mandy Parnell – mastering

== Charts ==
=== Weekly charts ===
Weekly chart performance for "Angels"
Chart (2012–2013)	Peak position
Australia (ARIA)	46
Belgium (Ultratop 50 Flanders)	29
Belgium (Ultratip Bubbling Under Wallonia)	43
France (SNEP)	102
Ireland (IRMA)	70
UK Indie (OCC)	2
US Bubbling Under Hot 100 Singles (Billboard)	3
US Hot Rock & Alternative Songs (Billboard)	33

=== Year-end charts ===
2013 year-end chart performance for "Angels"
Chart (2013)	Position
Australia Streaming (ARIA)	99

== Certifications ==
Certifications for "Angels"
Region	Certification	Certified units/sales
Canada (Music Canada)	Gold	40,000^{‡}
New Zealand (RMNZ)	Gold	15,000^{‡}
United Kingdom (BPI)	Gold	400,000^{‡}
United States (RIAA)	Gold	500,000^{‡}
^{‡} Sales+streaming figures based on certification alone.

== Release history ==
Release dates for "Angels"
Country	Date	Format	Label
United Kingdom	17 July 2012	Digital download	Young Turks; XL
United States	17 July 2012	Digital download	Young Turks; XL
Japan	18 July 2012	Digital download	Young Turks; XL
