= Daniela Comani =

Italian artist

Daniela Comani (born 4 February 1965 in Bologna, Italy) is an Italian artist. Since 1989, she has lived in Berlin, Germany.

== Biography ==
Comani received a Bachelor of Fine Arts degree from the Accademia di Belle Arti in Bologna, Italy (1988) and a Master of Fine Arts from the Universität der Künste in Berlin, Germany (1993).

The multimedia work of Comani touches on subjects like history, language, gender and identity. She often works with photos and texts from newspapers, television and books that allegedly appear familiar to us. Foreignness and intimacy, history and interpretation, and the mechanisms of comprehension are her concerns. Comani's artistic practice includes photography, texts, drawings, video and installation.

== Exhibitions (selection) ==
- 1992 – 37 Räume, Kunst-Werke Institute for Contemporary Art (KW), Berlin
- 1993 – More than zero, Magasin, Centre National d' Art Contemporain, Grenoble
- 1996 – Lesen, Kunsthalle St.Gallen, Switzerland
- 2006 – Das Achte Feld – Geschlechter, Leben und Begehren in der Kunst seit 1960, Museum Ludwig, Cologne
- 2007 – History will repeat itself, Kunst-Werke Institute for Contemporary Art (KW), Berlin
- 2007 – Ich war's, In 32 Tagen um den Alexanderplatz, NGBK / U2 Alexanderplatz, Berlin
- 2008 – Transmediale 08 – conspire!, Haus der Kulturen der Welt, Berlin
- 2008 – Bildpolitiken, Salzburger Kunstverein, Salzburg
- 2008 – HeartQuake, Museum on the Seam, Jerusalem
- 2008 – Focus on Contemporary Italian Art, MAMbo – Museo d'Arte Moderna, Bologna
- 2010 – Courier, University Art Museum, University at Albany, State University of New York
- 2010 – C'était moi. Journal 1900–1999, Centre d'Art Passerelle, Brest
- 2011 – 54. Biennale di Venezia / Repubblica di San Marino Pavilion, Venice
- 2011 – Doublespeak, Utah Museum of Contemporary Art, Salt Lake City, Utah
- 2012 – Le Printemps de Septembre: History is Mine! Musée Les Abattoirs, Toulouse
- 2013 – Authoritratti. Iscrizioni del femminile nell’arte italiana contemporanea, MAMbo – Museo d'Arte Moderna, Bologna
- 2014 - Ich war's. Tagebuch 1900-1999, dkw. Kunstmuseum Dieselkraftwerk, Cottbus
- 2015 - Unprotected Zone, Museum on the Seam, Jerusalem
- 2016 - Dall'oggi al domani, 24 ore nell'arte contemporanea, MACRO - Museo d'Arte Moderna, Rome
- 2017 - Faktor X - Das Chromosom in der Kunst, Haus der Kunst, Munich
- 2019 - Forgetting - Why We Don't Remember Everything, Historical Museum, Frankfurt, Frankfurt
- 2019 - Biography: A Model Kit / The Human Condition, Moscow Museum of Modern Art, Moscow
- 2020 - Metropolis, Museum on the Seam, Jerusalem
- 2022 - YOU ARE MINE, Galleria Nazionale d'Arte Moderna e Contemporanea, Rome (solo)
- 2023 - Planet Earth: 21st Century, Museum Folkwang, Essen (solo)
- 2024 - Überall und nirgendwo, Neues Museum Nürnberg, Nuremberg
- 2024 - Orlando's Library, site-specific installation, Doge's Palace Genoa, (solo)
- 2024 - Bangkok Art Biennale, Bangkok Art and Culture Centre, Bangkok
- 2025 - History Lessons, University Art Museum, University at Albany, State University of New York
- 2026 - Tragicomica - Perspectives on Italian art from the mid-20th century to today, MAXXI Museum, Rome

== Artist books and publications (selection) ==
- Orlando's Library - Vol. 2, Danilo Montanari Editore, 2024, ISBN 9791280750648
- You Are Mine, Monroe Books, Berlin, 2024, ISBN 978-3-946950-17-2
- Perturbazione/Disturbance, Danilo Montanari Editore, 2023, ISBN 9791280750341
- Daniela Comani: A-Z, Danilo Montanari Editore, 2023, ISBN 9791280750150
- 35q di bronzo (3.5 Tons of Bronze), Danilo Montanari Editore, 2021, ISBN 9788885449923
- The Beginning The End, Monroe Books, Berlin, 2021, ISBN 978-3-946950-09-7
- Planet Earth: 21st Century, Humboldt Books, Milano, 2019, ISBN 9788899385729
- 1975 - Diario di strada / Diary from the Road, Archive Books, Berlin, 2017, ISBN 978-3-943620-66-5
- Sunsets, Edition Patrick Frey, Zürich, 2016, ISBN 978-3-906803-17-3
- Eine glückliche Ehe / Un matrimonio felice / A Happy Marriage, Edition Patrick Frey, Zürich, 2014, ISBN 978-3-905929-52-2
- My Film History – Daniela Comani's Top 100 Films, Revolver Publishing, Berlin, 2013, ISBN 978-386895-301-5
- Novità editoriali a cura di Daniela Comani, Maurizio Corraini s.r.l., Mantua, 2012, ISBN 978-88-7570-360-8
- Neuerscheinungen hrsg. von Daniela Comani, Edition Patrick Frey, Zürich, 2009, ISBN 978-3-905509-78-6
- It was me. Diary 1900–1999, Maurizio Corraini s.r.l., Mantua, 2007, ISBN 978-88-7570-127-7
- Sono stata io. Diario 1900–1999, Maurizio Corraini s.r.l., Mantua, 2007, ISBN 978-88-7570-126-0
- comanicasino, REVOLVER Archiv für aktuelle Kunst, Frankfurt am Main, 2006, ISBN 978-3-86588-293-6
- Ich war’s. Tagebuch 1900–1999, REVOLVER Archiv für aktuelle Kunst, Frankfurt am Main, 2005, ISBN 978-3-86588-138-0
- Double Drawings, Vice Versa Verlag, Berlin, 2000, ISBN 3-932809-17-3
