= Coexist House =

Charitable organization

- Predecessor: Coexist Foundation
- Founded: 2018
- Type: Charity
- Registration no.: 1169185
- Purpose: Interfaith dialogue
- Location: Inner Temple, London
- Origins: Coexist Foundation
- Region served: Worldwide

Coexist House is a charity for interfaith dialogue based at Inner Temple in London, England.

The mission of Coexist House is:

To establish a global centre in the heart of London, aimed at transforming public understanding about the practices and perspectives of the world's faiths and religious traditions, to promote better, more peaceful relationships across divides.

Coexist House was launched in 2015 and continues the work of the Coexist Foundation, which was founded in 2005 by Mohammed Jameel KBE.

As of January 2024, Coexist House's board of trustees comprises Sir Bernard Rix, Professor Malik Dahlan and Professor Tim Winter. Previous trustees included Sir Roger Gifford (who died in 2021) and Robin Griffith-Jones. The charity has been led by Michael Wakelin and Fatimah Mohammed‐Ashrif.

== Launch of Coexist House ==
In 2013, the Coexist Foundation and the University of Cambridge Interfaith Programme launched the Coexist House initiative to establish a centre for multi-faith understanding and education in London. According to Sir Bernard Rix, chairman of Coexist House, the original idea had been for an "Abraham house" of the three religions of Judaism, Christianity and Islam, but later changed to a space where those of all faiths and none could come together.

The project was conceived by David Ford, Regius Professor of Divinity at the University of Cambridge, with an advisory board comprising the Coexist Foundation, the Cambridge Interfaith Programme, the City of London Corporation, the Victoria and Albert Museum and Inner Temple. The project was formally launched in 2013 at a dinner at the Mansion House, hosted by Sir Roger Gifford, where the Archbishop of Canterbury gave a speech in support.

In 2015, Coexist House had support from The Prince of Wales, the Archbishop of Canterbury, the Bishop of London, the Chief Rabbi, the Attorney General, and Princess Badiya bint El Hassan of Jordan. Eric Pickles, the Secretary of State for Communities and Local Government and Minister for Faith, announced government support for Coexist House at a speech at Temple Church in 2015. The fundraising target was £20 million.

An audience research study found "The overall concept […] is one of the most well received cultural concepts tested in the last 3 years" and Metaphor created the design and business plan.

In 2018, Coexist House was registered as a charity with the Charity Commission, and the Coexist Foundation was dissolved.

== Activities ==
In 2016, Coexist House produced Stations of the Cross, an exhibition to raise awareness for those in need of refuge, co-curated by Aaron Rosen, Catriona Laing and John W. Moody. The exhibition initially comprised 14 ancient and modern works, including by Bill Viola; Jacopo Bassano; Michael Takeo Magruder; Terry Duffy; Jacob Epstein; Leni Dothan; G. Roland Biermann; and Guy Reid. The exhibition was hosted in 2016 in London (with support from the Cambridge Interfaith Programme, King’s College London and Art and Sacred Places) – at the National Gallery, the Tower of London, Methodist Central Hall, and St Paul’s Cathedral; in 2017 in Washington, D.C. – at the National Cathedral, the Martin Luther King Jr. Memorial, adjacent to the Supreme Court and at the American University; and in 2018 in New York City – at The Cloisters, the Cathedral of St John the Divine and the 9/11 Memorial.

In 2017, Coexist House collaborated with Ernst & Young (EY) and Professor Adam Dinham from Goldsmiths, University of London to launch the EY Religious Literacy for Organisations programme, designed to help organisations better understand religious inclusion and its positive impact on business process and performance.

In 2018, Nicola Green collaborated with Coexist House, the University of Cambridge and King’s College London on the Encounters, an exhibition of 50 portraits of religious leaders, including the Pope, the Dalai Lama, Ali Gomaa, Jonathan Sacks and Justin Welby. The exhibition was shown at St Martin-in-the-Fields in London.

In 2018, Coexist House collaborated with British Muslim TV, Church Times and Jewish News for "21 4 21", a project to identify 21 individuals aged under 40 who are increasing dialogue and breaking down barriers, particularly as volunteers but also in their working lives. The 21 awardees were invited to meet and stay at St George's House on the grounds of Windsor Castle, and participated in a business plan competition with investors, sponsored by KAICIID. The competition winners included Mohammad Ryad Khodabocus, from the Luton-based organisation Grassroots, and Josephine Davidoff.

In 2019, Coexist House collaborated with Temple Church to convene a symposium at Middle Temple to test the hypothesis of Comparative Religious Law: Judaism, Christianity, Islam, a book by Professor Norman Doe, a professor at the Cardiff School of Law. The event was chaired by Mark Hill QC, honorary professor at Cardiff, and attended by Sir Andrew McFarlane, president of the Family Division, and Lord Woolf.

In 2019, Coexist House participated in the Greenbelt Festival, together with the Cambridge Interfaith Programme and Rose Castle.

== Coexist Foundation ==
The Coexist Foundation (stylised COEXIST or ☾OE✡︎IS†) was a charity founded in 2005 by Mohammed Jameel KBE and registered as with the Charity Commission in 2006. Its activities were transferred to Coexist House in 2015 and the charity was dissolved in 2018.

Coexist Foundation
- Founded: 2005
- Founder: Mohammed Jameel KBE
- Dissolved: 2018-02-09
- Type: Charity
- Registration no.: 1113284
- Purpose: Interfaith dialogue
- Region served: Worldwide
- Revenue: £3.15 million (2017)

=== Mission and governance ===
The original mission of the foundation was "to promote understanding and good relations between Christians, Jews and Muslims, as well as to improve their relations with other faiths and those of no faith, by means of education, dialogue and research", but this was later broadened as "to create understanding across divides" through education and innovation.

The founding director of the Coexist Foundation was James Kidner, formerly deputy private secretary to The Prince of Wales (later King Charles III). Its board of trustees included, at various times, the founder, Mohammed Jameel KBE; Robin Griffith-Jones, Master of the Temple; Rabbi David Rosen; Richard Chartres, Bishop of London; Lord Greville Janner; and Professor Muhammad Yunus, Nobel laureate.

=== Gallup partnership ===
A 2002 Gallup Poll of the Islamic world revealed rising tensions between religious and ethnic groups around the world, prompting the formation of the organization. The Coexist Foundation had a 10-year not-for-profit relationship with The Gallup Organization.

=== Cambridge Coexist Programme ===
The Cambridge Coexist Programme was a collaboration between the Cambridge Interfaith Programme and the Coexist Foundation. Activities included a collaboration with Goldsmiths, University of London on a religious literacy programme.

=== Sacred: Discover what we share ===
In 2007, the Coexist Foundation sponsored Sacred: Discover what we share, an exhibition of sacred manuscripts at the British Library. The exhibition was a critical success. Mary Beard said, "You're never likely to get to see such an extraordinary and stunningly beautiful collection of religious book-art ever again", and Norman Lebrecht described it as the "surprise hit of the London exhibition season". It was the most successful exhibition in the history of the British Library at the time, with 169,240 visitors by 9 September (three weeks prior to closing). The exhibition caused some controversy by including the dress worn by Jemima Goldsmith at her wedding to Imran Khan.

The exhibition was inaugurated by Prince Philip, Duke of Edinburgh, and Prince Rasheed ibn Hassan II of Morocco, with attendance from Mohammed Jameel KBE, founder of the Coexist Foundation; Lord Melvyn Bragg; Archbishop Kevin McDonald; Rowan Williams, the Archbishop of Canterbury; and Rabbi Sir Jonathan Sacks, the Chief Rabbi.

=== Three Faiths: Judaism, Christianity, Islam ===
In 2010, the Coexist Foundation sponsored Three Faiths: Judaism, Christianity, Islam, an exhibition of sacred exhibitions at New York Public Library (NYPL). Attendees of the opening included Mohammed Jameel KBE, founder of the Coexist Foundation; NYPL president Paul LeClerc, and Rabbi Julie Schonfeld. The New York Times noted Three Faiths was part of an ecumenical response to the September 11 attacks. It was inspired by the 2007 British Library exhibition Sacred: Discover what we share, which had originally been intended to tour to New York, but the British Library was concerned that heightened inspections post-9/11 could endanger its manuscripts and pulled out. Three Faiths instead drew on the NYPL's own collection.

The Coexist Foundation also contributed a light installation work by Ross Ashton to the NYPL for the exhibition, and supported workshops in sacred geometry and traditional arts delivered by The Prince's School of Traditional Arts. The exhibition was co-sponsored by the Stavros Niarchos Foundation, the Carnegie Corporation of New York and The Achelis and Bodman Foundations.

=== Coexist logo ===
The Coexist Foundation's logo was the Coexist sign, originally created in 2000 by Polish graphic designer Piotr Młodożeniec for a contest hosted by The Museum on the Seam for Dialogue, Understanding and Coexistence in Jerusalem.

=== Outreach initiatives ===
The Coexist Foundation was responsible for several projects that are meant to advance the objectives of the organization. An example is its radio show "Pause for Thought," which was created in collaboration with the BBC. The program includes guests from various religious backgrounds sharing their insights on a common subject.

One of the Foundation's projects was "Understanding Islam" a first series of internet learning resources designed to give an accessible but thorough introduction to Judaism, Christianity and Islam. The Coexist Foundation joined with online education specialists Microbooks and a team of scholars to develop the series.

The Coexist Foundation, operating through a sister 501(c)(3) organisation, Coexist Foundation America, supported fair trade projects, including working with Mirembe Kawomera in Uganda and Rajlakshmi Cotton Mills in India.

=== Wind-down and transfer to Coexist House ===
From 2015, all Coexist Foundation activities were transferred to Coexist House. Coexist Foundation was formally dissolved in 2018.
