= Piotr Młodożeniec =

Polish artist

- Born: 17 June 1956 (age 69); Warsaw, Warsaw Voivodeship, Polish People's Republic
- Education: Stephen Báthory 2nd High School
- Alma mater: Academy of Fine Arts
- Father: Jan Młodożeniec
- Relatives: Stanisław Młodożeniec

Piotr Młodożeniec (born 17 July 1956) is a graphic artist, painter, illustrator, designer, and author of animations, book and newspaper illustrations, and even neon light compositions.

== Life ==
Młodożeniec was born in 1956 to Jan Młodożeniec, a representative of the Polish Poster School. He had a brother, Stanisław Młodożeniec, a painter who resided in the US.

He graduated from Stephen Báthory 2nd High School in Warsaw in 1975 and From 1976 to 1981, he studied at the Academy of Fine Arts in Warsaw. He created graphic signs and leaflets for Solidarność. Together with Marek Sobczyk, founder of the company " Zafryki " creating posters and graphics.

In 2001, he designed the Coexist sign commissioned by the Museum on the Seam in Jerusalem, which was used by U2 as the central sign of their 2005 tour stage design. He also designed graphics on the walls of three stations of the M2 line of the Warsaw Metro (alongside Wojciech Fangor, who designed graphics for other stations).

== Awards ==
- 1993 – Grand Prix at the Chaumont Poster Festival.
- 1998 – Silver Medal at the 16th International Poster Biennale in Wilanów.
