= Jan Młodożeniec =

Polish graphic designer

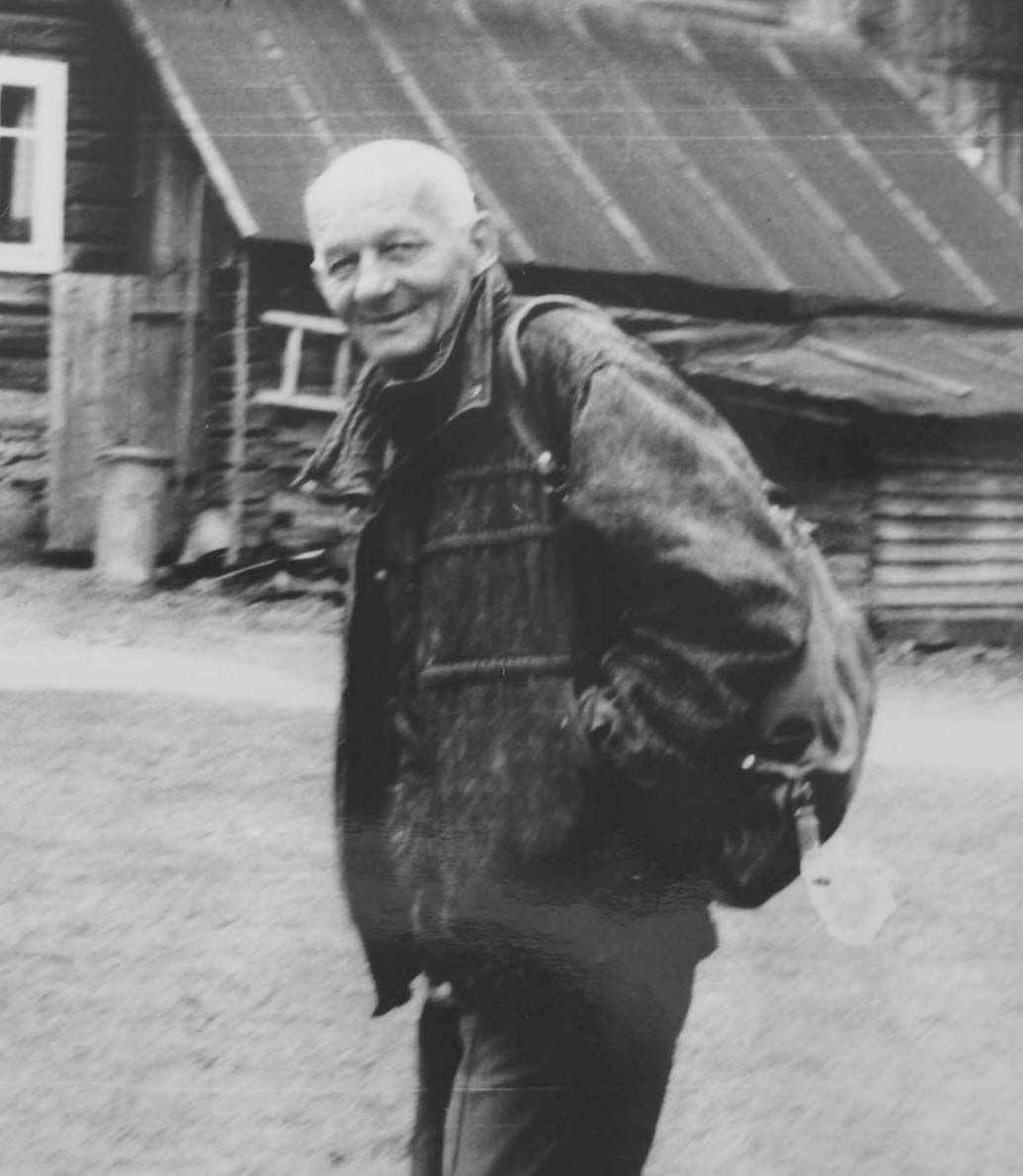
- Portrait of Młodożeniec in Zakopane, 1989
- Born: 1929; Warsaw, Warsaw Voivodeship, Second Polish Republic
- Died: 2000 (aged 70–71); Warsaw, Masovian Voivodeship, Poland
- Resting place: Powązki Cemetery
- Education: Academy of Fine Arts
- Occupation: Graphic designer
- Children: Piotr Młodożeniec

Jan Młodożeniec (8 November 1929 - 12 December 2000) was a Polish graphic designer. He worked in posters, drawing, book and publication design, and illustration.

== Life ==
Born in Warsaw, Młodożeniec studied from 1948 to 1955 at the Academy of Fine Arts in the Department of Graphic Arts and Posters of Henryk Tomaszewski.

He was a member of the Alliance Graphique International.

== Major awards ==
- 1965 - Special award, Film Poster Exhibition, Warsaw (Poland)
- 1965 - Second prize, International Film Poster Exhibition, Vienna (Italy)
- 1971 - Silver medal, Polish Poster Biennale, Katowice (Poland)
- 1977 - Bronze medal, Polish Poster Biennale, Katowice (Poland)
- 1980 - Gold medal, International Poster Biennale in Warsaw (Poland)
- 1981 - Bronze medal, Polish Poster Biennale, Katowice (Poland)
- 1981 - Gold medal, Polish Poster Biennale, Katowice (Poland)
- 1983 - First prize, Poster Biennale in Lahti (Finland)

== See also ==
- List of graphic designers
- List of Polish painters
- List of Polish graphic designers
- Graphic design
