= Raphie Etgar =

Israeli artist and curator

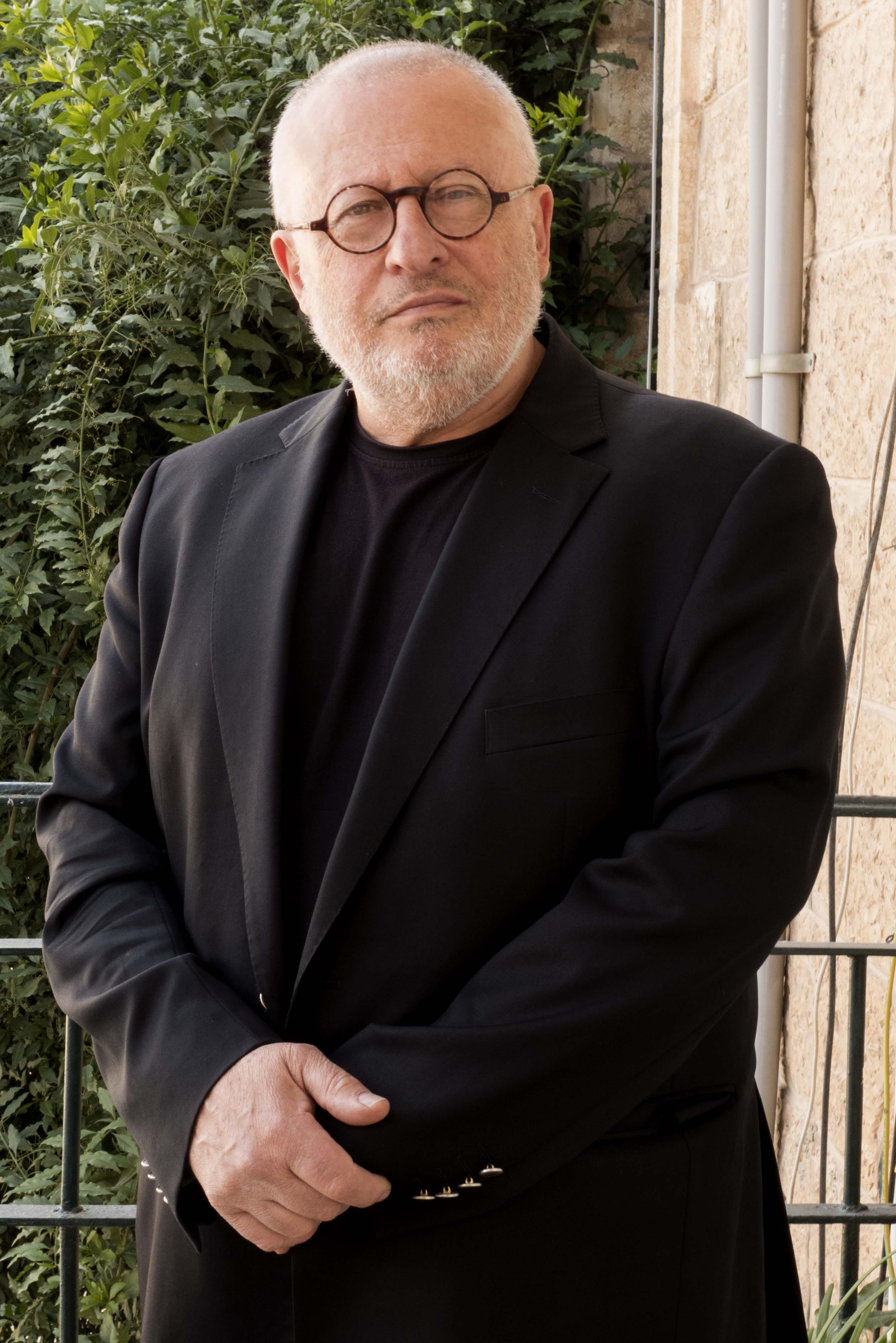
Raphie Etgar, 2016

Raphie Etgar (Hebrew: רפי אתגר; born August 1947, Jerusalem) is an Israeli artist and curator who has served as artistic Director of Museum on the Seam since its establishment in 2000 and until 2021.

== Biography ==
In 1972, Etgar graduated from the Bezalel Academy of Arts and Design in Jerusalem.

In 1980–1995 Etgar was a poster designer. He created over one thousand posters and prints for theater and cultural events in those years. Etgar was invited to lecture and direct projects in academies and art institutions such as Akademie der Künste, Berlin \ National College of Art and Design, Dublin \ Akademie der Bildenden Künste, Vienna \ Hochschule der Künste, Zurich \ Akademija Likovnih Umjetnosti, Sarajevo \ Kunstakademie, Düsseldorf \ Staatliche Akademie der Bildenden Künste, Stuttgart

In 1990–1999, Etgar was invited to serve as an art director and artist in residence to the S. FISHER publishing house in Germany. As part of his work he initiated a project that incorporates many leading authors and creates art works inspired by their books. Project "Bücher werden Plakate" involved Nobel Prize winning authors such as: Nadine Gordimer, J. M. Coetzee and Kenzaburō Ōe among others. His work with these renowned authors created a unique dialogue between the artistic and literary worlds that enriched the reading experience through the visual one.

The exhibitions he curates deal with issues at the center of public discourse, human rights, civic responsibility and the commitment to bring moral and social change through contemporary art in local and universal contexts. One of the objectives of the museum is to create dialogue in face of disagreement. The museum was named by The New York Times as one of the 29 leading art venues around the globe. In 2000 Etgar initiated the exhibition COEXISTENCE: an international project that incorporates leading poster designers from around the globe. The project was displayed in over 35 cities and called for mutual understanding between fellow nations and religions.

== Curated exhibitions ==
- 2005- DEAD END which dealt with the violence within Israeli society.
- 2006- EQUAL AND LESS EQUAL that focused on the issues of discrimination exploitation and humiliation.
- 2007- BARE LIFE about the personal and public consequences of a prolong state of emergency that becomes legitimized;
- 2008- HEARTQUAKE that examined the central role of anxiety in human interactions with their surroundings, thus examining the dynamics of social and political interactions.
- 2009- NATURE NATION that dealt with the complexity of encounters between humans with their natural environment.
- 2010- THE RIGHT TO PROTEST about the obligation that comes with the privilege of protest.
- 2011- WEST END about the clash of civilizations between Islam and the west and the possible consequences.
- 2012- BEYOND MEMORY faces the viewers with works of art that expose images delved from the archives of repression and denial of fears and anxieties from our past experiences, in an attempt to learn from them how to avoid repeating past mistakes.
- 2013- FLESH & BlOOD that calls upon us to look at flesh and blood as a fabric that connects all living beings to one family and to treat it with respect and compassion.
- 2013- EVERYONE CARRIES A ROOM INSIDE that examines loneliness as a major contemporary phenomenon, gaining more and more impact on people’s lives.
- 2014- AND THE TREES WENT FORTH TO SEEK A KING critically examines the complex inter-relationship between leaders and their subjects.
- 2015- UNPROTECTED ZONE about the responsibility and the ability of the individual to alter and influence his own future and his surroundings. The exhibition also deals with the question to what extent does the establishment and society intervenes in restricting the individual and shaping his world.
- 2017- THOU SHALT NOT which dealt with the interaction between the world of faith and the world of art, and served as a mirror depicting our times and their constant change.
- 2018- THE WOMEN BEHIND about the inner world of women, while identifying cases of subjugation and discrimination that mostly occur in the private and public spheres.
- 2019- THE CASE OF HIROSHIMA about the consequences of a total annihilation which the humanity produces, and the discussion issues of identity and ethics.
- 2019- EVEN THE TREES BLEED about the aesthetic, cultural, national and political meanings between trees and men, and their interdependence upon one another.
- 2019- JERUSALEM - SELF PORTRAIT the story of a city which brings together different people who though may be poles apart.
- 2019- DEMOCRACY NOW has democracy become a synonym for corruption?
- 2020- THE UNCANNY about the terrible trauma we simultaneously dreads and are attracted to.
- 2019- THE CRYING GAME about the horrors that lie a step or two away from the lives that most of us live.
- 2020- REBIRTH contemplates the natural forces and their innermost being, offering a moving experience of the process of creation in which the spirit is briefly touched and we are reborn.
- 2020- PINCHAS COHEN GAN a personal confession of an individual, expressing his critique and conveys a sense of existential meaning in a society consumed with its cultural and ethical difficulties.
- 2020- METROPOLIS about humankind’s race to reach further and higher.
- 2020- GOLEM is humankind on the verge of a struggle for control versus man-made machines, which are beginning to form their own independent thoughts?
- 2020- WASTELAND about the reality in light of the recent grave natural phenomena which are threatening our planet’s existence.
- 2020- NOT BY THE DRESS ALONE do we make the clothes or do the clothes make us?
- 2021- LIFE/STILL LIFE/LAND A tension ridden reality of the aggressive and divided Israeli society, which is prone to violent conflicts such as are expressed in the exhibition.

== Solo exhibitions ==
- 1990, Cambridge, Harvard University
- 1995, Jerusalem, Israel Museum- Palevsky Pavilion
- 1998, Essen, The German Poster Museum
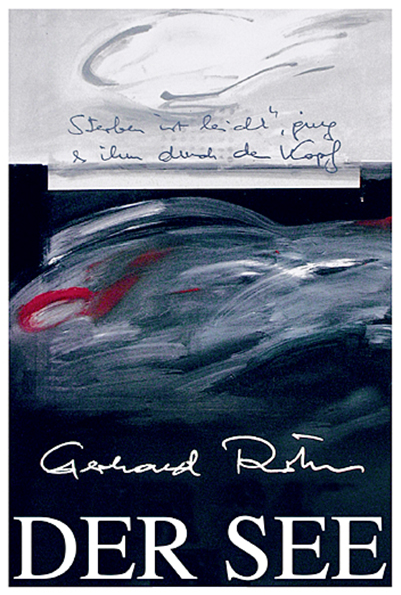

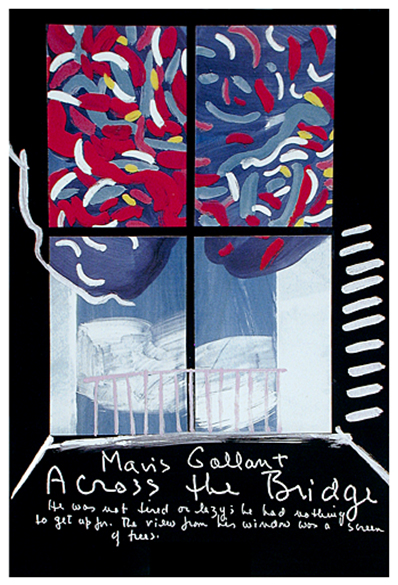

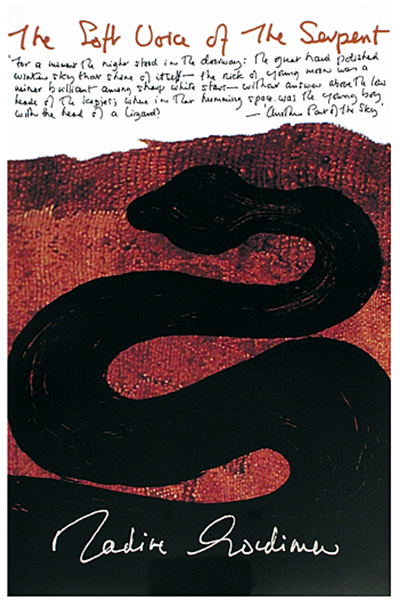

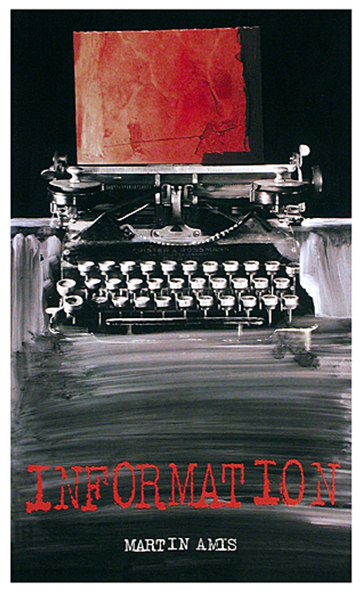

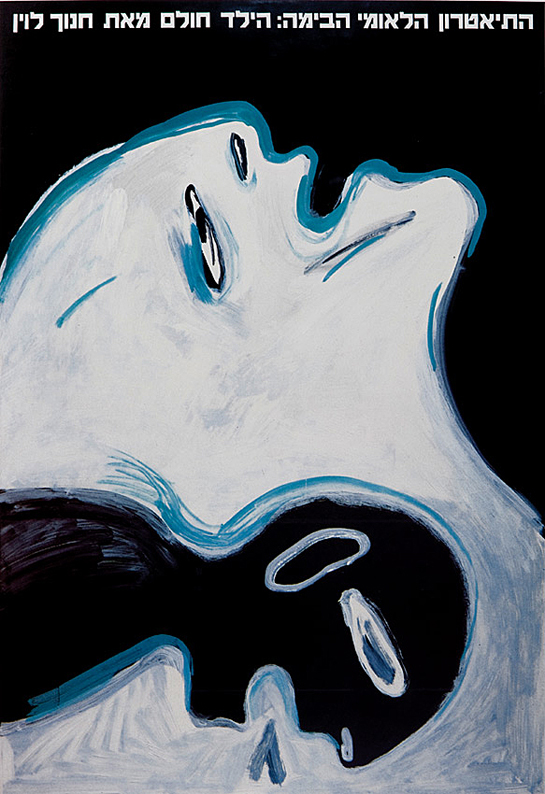

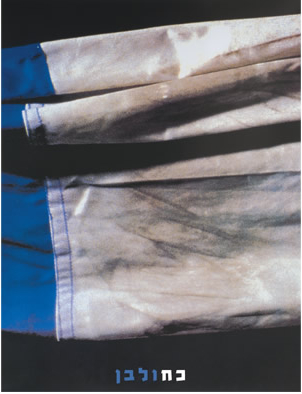
Raphie Etgar, BlueWhite. After Yitzhak Rabin's assassination, 1995

== See also ==
- Israeli art
