= Coexistence =

Multiple things existing together without conflict

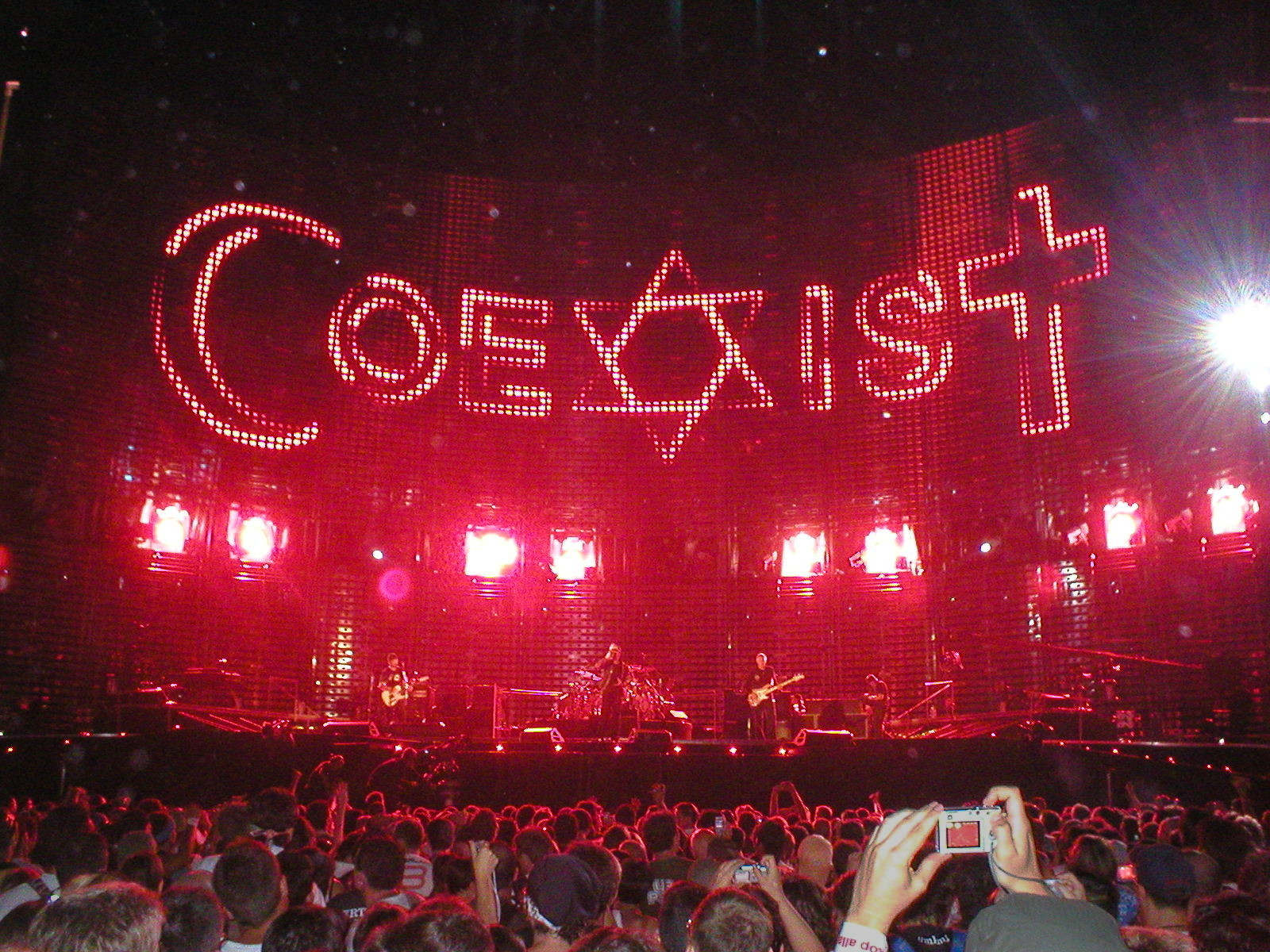
"Coexist" display at a U2 concert, containing Islamic, Jewish, and Christian symbols

Coexistence is the property of things existing at the same time and in a proximity close enough to affect each other, without causing harm to one another. The term is often used with respect to people of different persuasions existing together, particularly where there is some history of antipathy or violence between those groups.

Coexistence can be observed to a property of all systems in which different aspects capable of interacting with each other exist at the same time. As one source asserts, "even at the molecular level, existence is always already coexistence". Nonliving things can also be characterized as coexisting where multiple kinds of such things exist in the same space, with the term having been used for things as disparate as different kinds of dunes on Mars, and black holes existing in the same region of space as dense nuclear star clusters. Other examples of coexistence include:

- Peaceful coexistence, Soviet theory regarding relations between the socialist and capitalist blocs, and more generally the coexistence of different states in the international system
- Coexistence of similar species in similar environments; see coexistence theory
- Coexistence of multiple national groups within a polity; see plurinationalism

Coexistence does not require a complete absence of conflict, but may include "the simultaneous presence of banal tensions and conflicts of interest". Thus, a "minimal level of coexistence is compatible with competition and even conflicts, if conducted through legitimate channels".

Cultural Coexistence Theory (CCT), also called Social-ecological Coexistence Theory, expands on coexistence theory to explain how groups of people with shared interests in natural resources (e.g., a fishery) can come to coexist sustainably. Cultural Coexistence Theory draws on work by anthropologists such as Frederik Barth and John Bennett, both of whom studied the interactions among culture groups on shared landscapes. In addition to the core ecological concepts described above, which CCT summarizes as limited similarity, limited competition, and resilience, CCT argues the following features are essential for cultural coexistence:

1. Adaptability describes the ability of people to respond to change or surprise. It is essential to CCT because it helps capture the importance of human agency.
2. Pluralism describes where people value cultural diversity and recognize the fundamental rights of people not like them to live in the same places and access shared resources.
3. Equity as used in CCT describes whether social institutions exist that ensure that people's basic human rights, including the ability to meet basic needs, are protected, and whether people are protected from being marginalized in society.

Cultural Coexistence Theory fits in under the broader area of sustainability science, common pool resources theory, and conflict theory.

== Religious coexistence ==
Different religions have advocated for coexistence between their religion and others.

=== Coexistence in Islam ===
There are several verses in the Quran that allude to Muslims living alongside people of other faith:

"I do not worship what you worship, nor do you worship what I worship. I will never worship what you worship, nor will you ever worship what I worship. You have your way, and I have my Way.” [109:2-6]

"Let there be no compulsion in religion...." [2:256]

"˹In time,˺ Allah may bring about goodwill between you and those of them you ˹now˺ hold as enemies. For Allah is Most Capable. And Allah is All-Forgiving, Most Merciful. Allah does not forbid you from dealing kindly and fairly with those who have neither fought nor driven you out of your homes. Surely Allah loves those who are fair." [60:7-9]

Over the course of Islamic history there were several examples of religious coexistence under Muslim rule including during the reign of the Muslims in Al-Andalus where Muslims, Jews, and Christians alongside other religious groups lived together. Similarly, during the rule of the Ottoman Empire, non-Muslims were able to live under their own jurisdiction through a system known as the Millet where they would be given a significant amount of autonomy within their own communities and would not be subject to Islamic law.

=== Coexistence in Buddhism ===
Buddhism advocates living the Middle Way, where one limits their biases and avoids excluding others. Through the Middle Way, Buddhism advocates that we cannot survive without others and that one should thus work to make positive relations with others. Buddhism also speaks of seeking harmony between self and other and avoiding confrontation by developing peaceful relations between different communities.
