= Museum on the Seam =

Museum in Jerusalem

Coordinates: 31.786381°N 35.226789°E

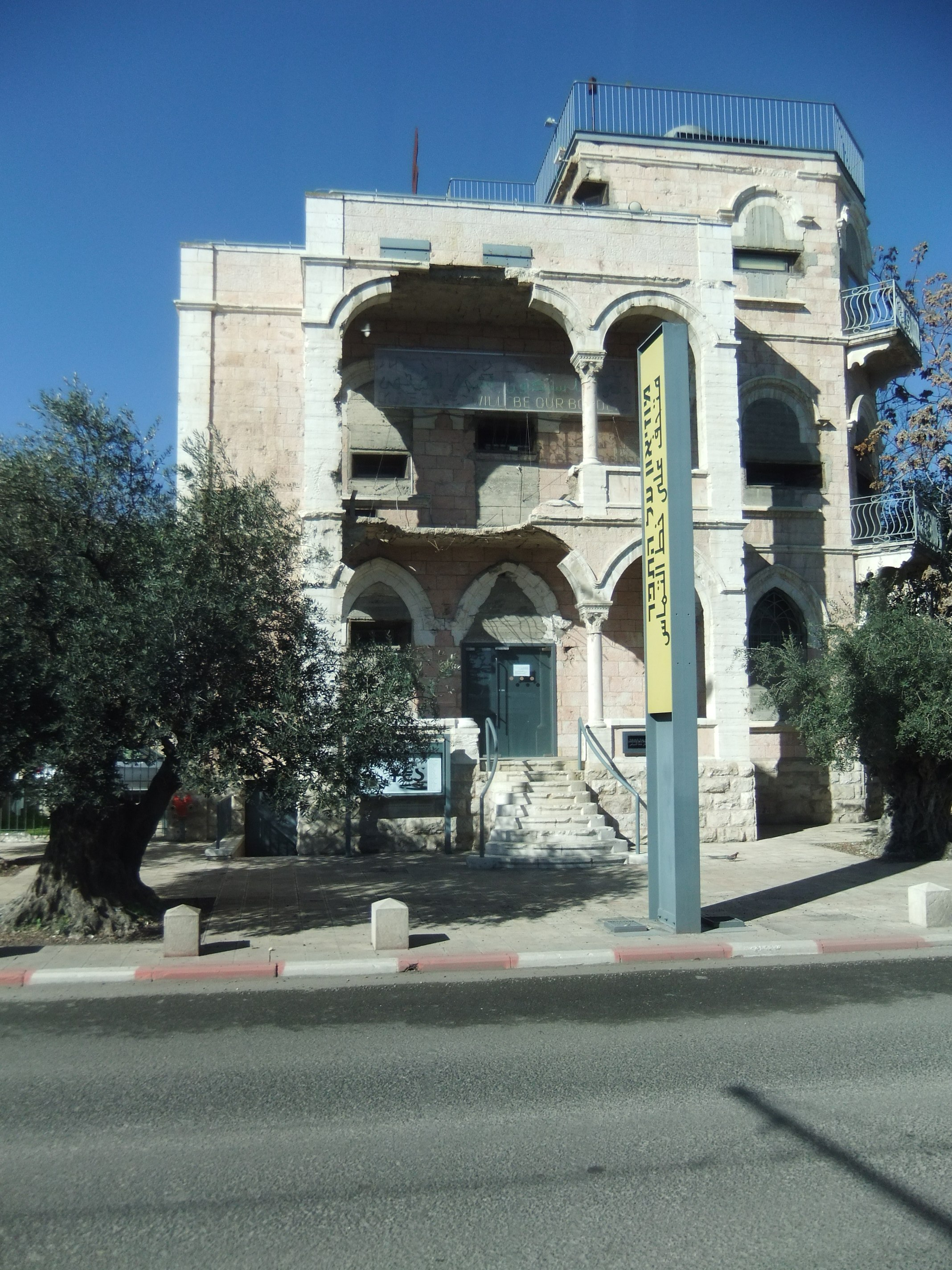
- Established: 1999
- Location: Jerusalem
- Type: Art and politics
- Website: www.mots.org.il

Museum on the Seam is a socio-political contemporary art museum located on the border between West Jerusalem and East Jerusalem.

== About the museum ==
Founded in 1999, Museum on the Seam is housed in a neo-classical building designed by Andoni Baramki, a Palestinian Arab architect who built it as a family residence. The property was appropriated by Israel after 1948. According to the museum website, the museum focuses on "controversial social issues for public discussion,” with exhibitions on social issues like the right to protest, the decline of Western hegemony, and state/private home relationships.

Museum on the Seam has been cited by The New York Times as one of the world's 29 cultural 'one must-see-before-I-die destinations.' According to its public presentations, it brings social and moral change in face of a complex and conflict-ridden reality.

The museum was established by Raphie Etgar. It has been supported for decades by the Holtzbrink Family Foundation. through the Jerusalem Foundation. Leading contemporary artists have shown their work at this museum, including Anselm Kiefer, Bruce Nauman, Bill Viola, Christian Boltanski, Sophie Calle, Wim Wenders, Thomas Hirschhorn, Gilbert & George, Paul McCarthy, Barbara Kruger, Jenny Holzer, Douglas Gordon, William Kentridge, Santiago Sierra, Alfredo Jaar, Edward Burtynsky, Yael Bartana, Michal Rovner, Dani Karavan, Moshe Gershuni, Micha Ullman, Joshua Neustein, Larry Abramson, Sigalit Landau, Tsibi Geva, Menashe Kadishman, Miki Kratsman, Gilad Ophir, Michal Na'aman and many others.

== History of the building ==
=== Baramki family home ===
The house was built to serve as his home by the Christian Arab architect Andoni Baramki in 1932, on one dunam of property purchased from the Turjman family. The Baramki family was forced to flee as refugees, after a stray bullet almost killed the architect's wife while she was sitting in her living room, during the 1948 Palestinian expulsion and flight during the 1948 Arab–Israeli War.

=== Israeli military outpost ===
The Baramki home was turned into an Israeli military outpost, called the "Tourjman Post" situated on the border or no man's land between Israel and Jordan overlooking the Mandelbaum Gate, which served as the only passage between the two parts of the divided city at the time. The finely wrought window arches were filled with concrete to form turrets. During the battles of the 1967 War, the house suffered hits from shells and bullets which left their marks on the building and are apparent to this day.

At war's end, the Baramkis crossed over with their keys and title-deeds but were rebuffed. As was the case with the Turjmans, all efforts by Andoni and his son Gabi Baramki, longtime President of Birzeit University in the West Bank, to return to and repossess the family home through recourse in Israeli courts, failed. The reasons were various: it was claimed initially that the site was required for military security, then that it was in a hazardous state, in need of substantial repairs, and finally that it fell under Israeli laws in a united Jerusalem, and, despite their presence, the family were classified as absentee property owners. Gabi Baramki was allowed only one visit, in 1999/ 2000 and regards it as "stolen property".

=== Military museum ===
In 1981 the military outpost was renovated and renamed as the "Tourjman Post Museum" commemorating the reunification of the city. The museum mounted exhibits of the guns, mortars and other weapons used in its defense.

=== Tolerance museum ===
In 1999 the building underwent change and a new permanent exhibition, calling for tolerance and mutual understating between people in the region, was displayed. On the day of its dedication, it was opened ostensibly as a site for 'peace, tolerance,... dialogue, understanding and coexistence'.

=== Socio-political art museum ===
Since 2005, the building serves as a home to the Museum on the Seam - a socio-political contemporary art museum dedicated to dialogue and mutual understanding.

== Exhibitions ==
- 2005- DEAD END which dealt with the violence within Israeli society.
- 2006- EQUAL AND LESS EQUAL that focused on the issues of discrimination exploitation and humiliation.
- 2007- BARE LIFE about the personal and public consequences of a prolong state of emergency that becomes legitimized;
- 2008- HEARTQUAKE that examined the central role of anxiety in human interactions with their surroundings, thus examining the dynamics of social and political interactions.
- 2009- NATURE NATION that dealt with the complexity of encounters between humans with their natural environment.
- 2010- Home Less Home aspired to investigate the relationship between the private home and the state.
- 2010- THE RIGHT TO PROTEST about the obligation that comes with the privilege of protest.
- 2011- WEST END about the clash of civilizations between Islam and the west and the possible consequences.
- 2012- BEYOND MEMORY faces the viewers with works of art that expose images delved from the archives of repression and denial of fears and anxieties from our past experiences, in an attempt to learn from them how to avoid repeating past mistakes.
- 2013- FLESH & BLOOD that calls upon us to look at flesh and blood as a fabric that connects all living beings to one family and to treat it with respect and compassion.
- 2013- EVERYONE CARRIES A ROOM INSIDE that examines loneliness as a major contemporary phenomenon, gaining more and more impact on people’s lives.
- 2014- AND THE TREES WENT FORTH TO SEEK A KING critically examines the complex inter-relationship between leaders and their subjects.
- 2015- UNPROTECTED ZONE about the responsibility and the ability of the individual to alter and influence his own future and his surroundings. The exhibition also deals with the question to what extent does the establishment and society intervenes in restricting the individual and shaping his world.
- 2016- MY BELOVED AFGHANISTAN presents the last photos of the Pulitzer Prize winner, Anja Niedringhaus, before her assassination in Afghanistan, which show rare documentation of women's lives during and after the Taliban rule.
- 2017-THOU SHALT NOT which dealt with the interaction between the world of faith and the world of art, and served as a mirror depicting our times and their constant change.
- 2018- THE WOMEN BEHIND about the inner world of women, while identifying cases of subjugation and discrimination that mostly occur in the private and public spheres.
- 2019- THE CASE OF HIROSHIMA about the consequences of a total annihilation which the humanity produces, and the discussion issues of identity and ethics.
- 2019- EVEN THE TREES BLEED about the aesthetic, cultural, national and political meanings between trees and men, and their interdependence upon one another.
- 2019- JERUSALEM - SELF PORTRAIT the story of a city which brings together different people who though may be poles apart.
- 2019- DEMOCRACY NOW has democracy become a synonym for corruption?
- 2019- THE UNCANNY about the terrible trauma we simultaneously dreads and are attracted to.
- 2019- THE CRYING GAME about the horrors that lie a step or two away from the lives that most of us live.
- 2020- REBIRTH contemplates the natural forces and their innermost being, offering a moving experience of the process of creation in which the spirit is briefly touched and we are reborn.
- 2020- PINCHAS COHEN GAN a personal confession of an individual, expressing his critique and conveys a sense of existential meaning in a society consumed with its cultural and ethical difficulties.
- 2020- METROPOLIS about humankind’s race to reach further and higher.
- 2020- GOLEM is humankind on the verge of a struggle for control versus man-made machines, which are beginning to form their own independent thoughts?
- 2020- WASTELAND about the reality in light of the recent grave natural phenomena which are threatening our planet’s existence.
- 2020- NOT BY THE DRESS ALONE do we make the clothes or do the clothes make us?
- 2021- LIFE/STILL LIFE/LAND A tension ridden reality of the aggressive and divided Israeli society, which is prone to violent conflicts.
- 2021- EXAMPLES TO FOLLOW (Curator: Adrienne Goehler) The exhibition deals with different layers of climate change, encourages a vision of a sustainable lifestyle and emphasizes the idea that every person can be a part of the green revolution.
- 2022- AFFECTED (Curator: Alon Razgour) The exhibition captures the artistic frame of mind in times of plague and crisis, and describes how the world is shaped by the new reality.
- 2022- ALWAYS HAVE BEEN, ALWAYS WILL BE (Curator: Dveer Shaked) seeks to tell the wide and varied local LGBTQ story, through the historical timeline on the one hand, and through the space axis on the other hand.
- 2022- ALPHA (Curator: Shahar Shalev) presents a wide range of views on Israeli masculinity, which express the changing discourse on the subject.
- 2022- KINGS OF THE HILL (Curator: Shahar Shalev) explores initiation and naturalization ceremonies, through symbols and rituals closely related to the value system of modern Israeli society and culture.
- 2022- CLOSE (Curator: Avital Wexler) offers us a space that contains the wild and raw alongside aesthetic restraint and order while hinting at, or explicitly referencing, the female body.
- 2023- THE JERUSALEM SYNDROME (Curator: Andrzej Wajs) brings together a rich archive of interviews conducted by the artist Katarzyna Kozyra with extraordinary individuals who believe themselves to be Messiahs.
- 2023- THE AGREEMENT (Curator: Dr. Shir Aloni Yaari) places the human experience at the centre, while exploring the social settings, contexts and constraints that shape it.
- 2023- DEMOCRISIS (Curator: Chen Shapira) documents acts of protest along the years in Israel, and raises questions about the limits of democracy and freedom of expression in Israel.
- 2023- CONTINUITY (Curator: Dr. Shir Aloni Yaari) experiences of loss, memory, and individual and collective traumas.
- 2023- GAZA CANAL (Curator: Chen Shapira) depicts the fictional story of digging a canal separating the Gaza Strip from Israel, and presents us with a utopian dream and vision on the one hand, but also a story of denial and disregard for a dystopian reality on the other hand.
- 2024- WELCOME HOME / COME HOME (Curator: Dr. Shir Aloni Yaari) A neon piece regularly flashes, causing the letters 'Wel' to disappear and reappear, while the phrase 'Come Home' persists as a poignant plea for the return of the hostages.
- 2024- TOPHET offers a heterogeneous space of observation and thought based on contradiction, investigation, and doubt.
- 2024- REBEL WOMEN OF THE APOCRYPHA (Curator: Dr. Shir Aloni Yaari) captures the stories of formidable women in the Bible, which serve as the antithesis to the expected roles of 'nice,' good, and obedient women prescribed by the male order.
- 2024- EMEI MOUNTAINS (Curator: Leeza Ahamdy) drawing inspiration from landscape paintings and ancient Daoist philosophy, the exhibition adopts a non-anthropocentric perspective to connect with nature's creative forces.
- 2024- ORAYTA: FROM CONTENT TO FORM (Curator: Dr. David Sperber) seeks to present a new artistic trend, of works that mark the value of the sacred text precisely through its materiality.
- 2024- I, TWO. (Curator: Shahar Shalev) examines the range of movement, freedom of creation, and the boundaries of the self within both artistic and socio-political spaces.
- 2024- EVERY THING embodies a holistic approach to living in unison and harmony with our environment, offering an alternative perspective on the mutual relationship between the design world, mankind, and the full array of living forms.

In 2000 Museum on the Seam produces, as an initiative by Raphie Etgar, the exhibition COEXISTANCE: an international project that incorporates many leading poster designers from around the globe. The project was displayed in over 35 cities in different continents and called for mutual understanding between fellow nations and religions. Its global Journey was endorsed and supported by world leaders and thinkers.

== See also ==
- Coexist (image)
- Visual arts in Israel
