= Coexist (image) =

2000 religious tolerance-themed graphic

The Coexist image created by Piotr Młodożeniec

The Coexist image (often styled as "CoeXisT" or "COEXIST") is an image created by Polish, Warsaw-based graphic designer Piotr Młodożeniec in 2000 as an entry in an international art competition sponsored by the Museum on the Seam for Dialogue, Understanding and Coexistence. The original version was one of dozens of works displayed as large outdoor posters in Jerusalem in 2001. It is designed to represent tolerance between religions.

Variations of this artwork have been used as bumper stickers and elements in rock concerts.

== Creation – COEXISTENCE art exhibition ==
Piotr Młodożeniec, a Polish graphic designer based in Warsaw, had his original work chosen by a jury to be one of several dozen images to be displayed as 3 m (9.8 ft) x 5 m (16 ft) outdoor posters as part of a touring exhibit sponsored by the Museum on the Seam in Jerusalem. The exhibit opened to the public in Jerusalem in 2001.

His original image consisted of the word COEXIST in all capital letters, with the C replaced by an oversized Muslim Crescent, the X replaced by an oversized Star of David, and the T replaced by an oversized Latin Cross.

== U2 Vertigo Tour ==
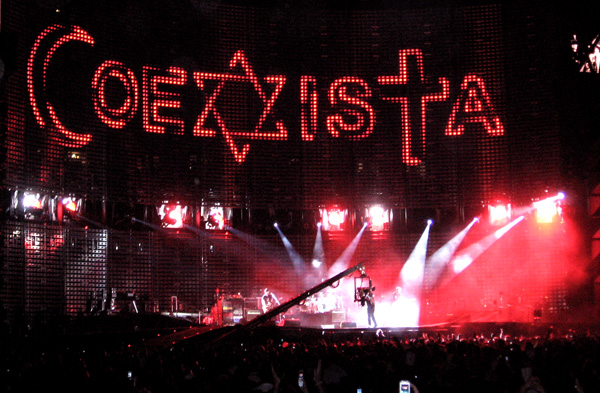
U2 in Mexico City on the Vertigo tour – photo taken during the playing of Sunday Bloody Sunday

During the international 2005–2006 Vertigo Tour of the Irish rock band U2, the original version of the image played a key role. Shortly after playing "Sometimes You Can't Make It on Your Own", the group would play politically-themed songs. During the opening portion of "Love and Peace or Else", Bono wore a white headband bearing a handwritten version of the word. In some venues, including Mexico City, the word was displayed on large electronic signs.

== Bumper sticker ==
The image and variations of it are used as automobile bumper stickers.

The bumper stickers first began to emerge in the United States in the early 2000s in partial response to the military involvement in Iraq and Afghanistan which began after the events of September 11, 2001. The stickers signify the capability or desire of humans to live together in peace.

One common version of the bumper sticker spells "COEXIST" using an Islamic crescent moon for the "C", a peace sign for the "O", the Hindu Om symbol for the "E”, a Star of David for the "X", a pentacle for the dot of the "I", a yin-yang symbol for the "S", and a Christian cross for the "T". This version, designed by Jerry Jaspar, is perhaps the most common version of the bumper sticker. In a different variation, both the male and female symbols are combined with a lowercase “e”, in place of the Om symbol. The lowercase "e" represents science - the "e" coming from E=mc².

The prevalence of the COEXIST bumper stickers has been noted in the Bay Area region centered on San Francisco. Users of the bumper stickers are often not practicing adherents of religion. This has led to one academic, Mark Coppenger, of the Southern Baptist Theological Seminary to criticize the use of the symbol by atheists and to also question the ability of the bumper sticker to affect a wider audience.

== Legal disputes ==
In 2005, Młodożeniec and U2 were unaware of each other. They were also unaware that a company, COEXIST LLP in Indiana already filed for a trademark in the United States in 2003. At the time, as there was no official U2 merchandise carrying this image, U2 fans created their own.

COEXIST LLP (now dissolved) filed suit against companies like CafePress in May 2005 to stop sales of merchandise they had not authorized. Młodożeniec's attorneys maintained that he owned the copyright to the image, and according to The History Behind the COEXIST Logo("History"), Młodożeniec repudiates COEXIST LLP as trying to steal his design to profit from lawsuits. Separately, The Museum on the Seam, which sponsored the competition in which the original image first appeared in public, claimed legal rights to the image.

Recently the COEXIST Foundation has worked to hold the rights of the design. CEO Tarek Elgawhary saw the logo as an opportunity to promote the foundation.

== Versions and other variations ==
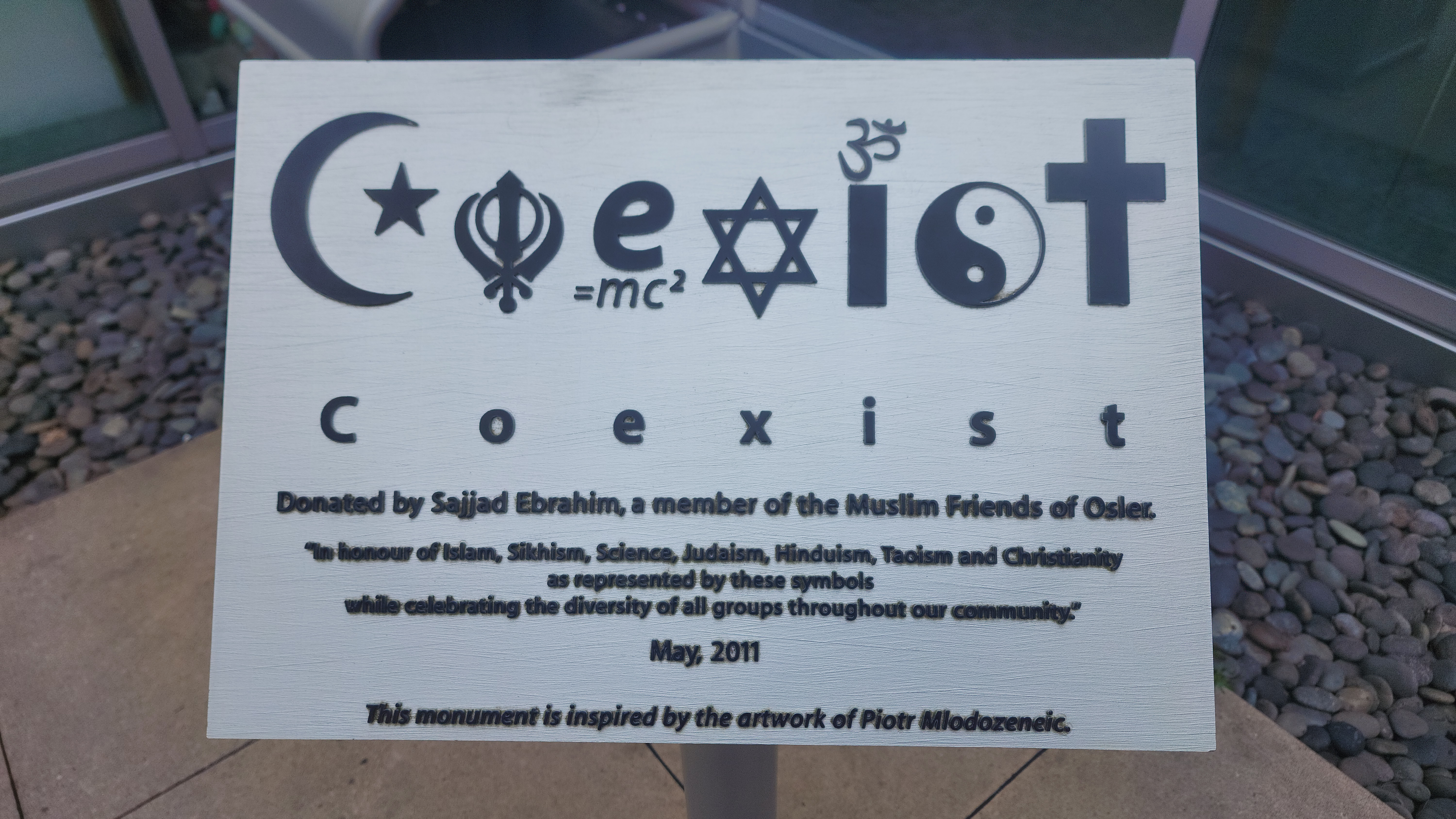
A variation on a plaque at the Brampton Civic Hospital in Ontario, Canada

The following table shows the individual characters of the more well-known versions, either as Unicode characters, icons, or descriptions.

C	o	e	x	i	ı	̇	s	t	notes
☪	o	e	✡	i	-	-	s	✝ (Note: Unicode character or image is approximate)	(original image)
☪	☮	e	✡	-	ı	☯	s	✝	pbyrne on Flickr
☪	☮	⚥	✡	-	ı	⍟	☯	✝	
☪	☬	E = mc²	✡	-	ı	ॐ	☯	✝	Xynorath on Wikimedia

Other published variations

- Translations, such as Coexista (at a U2 concert in Mexico City)
- A more updated version of the bumper sticker exists where the "i" in the word is dotted with a talisman symbol known as a pentacle. This version appears in films due to this version's popularity, taking particular focus as the final camera shot at the end of the Honda Odyssey fight in the 2024 film Deadpool & Wolverine, where a bloody battle between the two titular heroes is humorously framed as an intimate same-sex love scene in the Odyssey's back that ends on a close-up of a prominent "Coexist" bumper sticker.

== Parodies ==
There are several parodies, spelling out words such as 'Toxic', 'Fiction', 'Contradict', 'Atheist', 'Heathen', 'Cointelpro', 'Costco', and 'Convert'. There is also an anti-Islamic version with the image of the crescent altered with the addition of explosives.

Other parodies include a Communist hammer and sickle for the "E" and a swastika for the "X", indicating the dangers inherent in totalitarian ideologies, and weapon-related versions.

== See also ==
- Coexist Foundation
