= Tension (music) =

Emotional effect in music

In music, tension is the anticipation music creates in a listener's mind for relaxation or release. For example, tension may be produced through reiteration, increase in dynamic level, gradual motion to a higher or lower pitch, or (partial) syncopations between consonance and dissonance.

Experiments in music perception have explored perceived tension in music, and perceived emotional intensity.

The balance between tension and repose are explored in musical analysis—determined by contrasts that are, "...of great interest to the style analyst," and can be analyzed in several, even conflicting layers—as different musical elements such as harmony may create different levels of tension than rhythm and melody.

Heavy metal and rock musicians adapted tension-building techniques originally developed by classical composers. Van Halen has been noted for incorporating harmonic tension and release in the guitar solo Eruption:"Van Halen continually sets up implied harmonic goals, and then achieves, modifies, extends or subverts them...ringing harmonics and gradual fade make this an ambiguous closure". Music that alternates quiet-loud-quiet like Joseph Haydn's so-called "Surprise Symphony" attempted to create tension through dynamics variation. Emphasis on music accent is a tension and anticipation building device seen in heavy metal that was typical of Stravinsky.

== See also ==
- Conclusion (music)
- Musical argument
- Variation (music)
