= Anxi =

Anxi may refer to:

- Anxi County (安溪县), Quanzhou, Fujian
- Guazhou County (安西县), formerly Anxi County, in Jiuquan, Gansu
  - Guazhou Town (Gansu), formerly Anxi Town (安西镇), in what is now Guazhou County
- Protectorate General to Pacify the West, a Central-Asian military government established by Tang Dynasty
- Arsacid Empire, rendered as Anxi in historical Chinese writings
- Anxi., a song from Kelly Lee Owens' self-titled album.
