= Petals Have Fallen =

Album by DELS

Studio album by DELS
- Released: 3 November 2014
- Recorded: 2012–2014, Studiobokkle (London, UK)
- Length: 41:35
- Label: Big Dada
- Producer: Kwes (also exec.); Andrew Telling; Eli.T; Blue May; Bonobo; James Spankie; CLAVES; Micachu; Coby Sey; Mizz Beats

DELS chronology
Black Salad EP (2011)	Petals Have Fallen (2014)

Professional ratings
Aggregate scores
Source	Rating
Metacritic	79/100
Review scores
Source	Rating
Clash Magazine	9/10 stars
DIY Magazine	4/5 stars
Music OMH	4/5 stars
Mojo Magazine	8/10 stars
Q Magazine	(positive)

Petals Have Fallen is the second album by DELS. It was released through Ninja Tune imprint, Big Dada on 3 November 2014 on vinyl, CD and digital format.

I met most of the people that contributed to this album on MySpace back in 2005. We had a page called “Loners", where myself and the likes of Kwes, Micachu, Ghostpoet, Sampha, Coby Sey, Elan Tamara and others were all featured. We always said that we'd do a proper album together eventually. Petals Have Fallen is probably the closest thing to that happening to date.

== Track listing ==
No.	Title	Writer(s)	Producer(s)	Length
1.	"Limbo"	Kieren Gallear	Andrew Telling; Eli.T; Kwes.	2:23
2.	"Fall Apart"	Gallear	Blue May; Kwes.	4:22
3.	"House Of Commons"	Gallear	Blue May	2:59
4.	"Pulls" (featuring Kerry Leatham)	Gallear; Kerry Leatham	Bonobo; Kwes.	4:05
5.	"You Live In My Head" (featuring Elan Tamara)	Gallear	James Spankie; Kwes. (add.)	4:10
6.	"Burning Beaches" (featuring Rosie Lowe)	Gallear	Kwes.; CLAVES	4:02
7.	"Pack Of Wolves"	Gallear	Eli.T; Kwes.	3:24
8.	"RGB"	Gallear	Micachu; Kwes.	3:22
9.	"Bird Milk" (featuring BILA)	Gallear; Nahbila Boulahri	Kwes.	5:37
10.	"Lost For Words"	Gallear	Blue May; Kwes.	4:16
11.	"Petals Have Fallen" (featuring Tirzah)	Gallear; Mastin	Coby Sey; Kwes. (add.)	2:59
Total length:				41:35

Hidden bonus track
No.	Title	Writer(s)	Producer(s)	Length
12.	"149"	Gallear	Mizz Beats; Kwes.	3:57

== Personnel ==
- Art Direction and Design – Dels
- Cover Painting – Arth Daniels
- Executive Producer – Kwes.
- Management – Toby Donnelly
- Mastered By – Max
- Mixed By – Blue May (tracks: 3); Kwes. (tracks: 1, 2, 4, 5, 6, 7, 8, 9, 10, 11)

== Coby Sey version ==
"Petals Have Fallen"

Single by Coby Sey
- Released: 31 May 2017
- Length: 3:00
- Label: Self-released
- Songwriters: Coby Sey; Kwesi Sey
- Producers: Coby Sey; Kwes

Coby Sey singles chronology
"Whities 010: Transport for Lewisham" (2017)	"Petals Have Fallen" (2017)	"Face" (2018)

Petals Have Fallen is an instrumental single released by Coby Sey on 31 May 2017, three years after the release of the vocal track by DELS and Tirzah and album of the same name by DELS.
