= Kwesachu Mixtape Vol.1 =

Mixtape by Kwes. & Micachu
- Released: 5 June 2009
- Recorded: 2008–2009
- Genres: Pop; electronic
- Length: 51:20
- Label: Self-released
- Producers: Kwesachu (Micachu and Kwes.)

Micachu chronology
Jewellery (2009)	Kwesachu Mixtape Vol.1 (2009)	Meat Batch Mixtape (2011)

Kwes. chronology
Kwesachu Mixtape Vol.1 (2009)	No Need To Run (2010)

Kwesachu Mixtape Vol.1 is the first collaboratively produced mixtape album by producers/songwriters Micachu and Kwes and the second mixtape album by musician Micachu. Together, the producers are known as Kwesachu.

== Details ==
Kwesachu Mixtape Vol.1 features reworks of musicians including Hot Chip, Cibelle, Metronomy, Golden Silvers, The Invisible, Man Like Me, Finn Peters, and guests upcoming artists associated with the two musicians, including MCs Ghostpoet and DELS, Romy of The xx, Brother May, Elan Tamara and Micachu's band The Shapes.

== Launch Party ==
A launch party was held at the Cable club in London on 5 June 2009, featuring a live Kwesachu performance which included Micachu, Kwes, Dels and Ghostpoet.

== Releases ==
The mixtape was digitally released via their internet websites on 5 June 2009 in MP3 format. Kwesachu Vol.1 has also been pressed onto an unknown limited number of tape cassettes, available for purchase from the Rough Trade – East Shop in Brick Lane, London. All the songs are contained as one track which lasts 51 minutes and 20 seconds.

== Second mixtape ==
In April 2012, the duo released their second collaborative mixtape, Kwesachu Mixtape Vol.2, which features returning collaborators DELS and Ghostpoet, amongst many others. To mark its release, the duo performed a live music show with many of their collaborators on 28 April 2012, at The Southbank Centre in London, UK.

== Track listing ==
No.	Title	Writer(s)	Artist(s)	Length
1.	"Metal"	Levi, M	Micachu	0:00
2.	"Freefire"	Jimiwe, O; Dickins, K; Sey, K	Ghostpoet & DELS	1:54
3.	"(untitled)"	Brother May; Levi, M	Brother May	5:45
4.	"Monster's Waltz Rework Medley"	Okumu, D; Herbert, T; Taylor, L; Sey, K; Levi, M	The Invisible	7:34
5.	"Violina"	Dickins, K; Levi, M	DELS	12:12
6.	"Epping"	Sey, K; Mottley E.T	Kwes feat. Elan Tamara	14:41
7.	"Morning"	Jimiwe, O; Levi, M	Ghostpoet feat. Micachu	16:48
8.	"One Pure Thought Rework"	Taylor, A; Goddard, J; Clarke, O; Martin, F; Doyle, A; Sey, K	Hot Chip	19:31
9.	"Radio Ladio Remix"	Mount, J; Levi, M; Khan, R; Pell, M	Metronomy	24:05
10.	"Stay"	Bienek, K; Levi, M	Micachu feat. Miss Bienek	26:18
11.	"White Hair Rework"	Cavalli, C; Sey, K	Cibelle	28:24
12.	"True Romance Remix"	Gold, G; Levi, M; Khan, R; Pell, M	Golden Silvers	31:14
13.	"Shapeshift Rework"	Dickins, K; Sey, K	DELS	35:14
14.	"Closer Ne-Yo Cover"	Smith, Jr., S.C; Beite, M; Eriksen, M.S; Hermansen, T.E; Stray, B.R; Sey, K; Levi, M	Kwesachu feat. Romy of The xx	39:07
15.	"Camping in England Remix"	Langer, J; Levi, M	Man Like Me	42:33
16.	"Love Blind"	Jimiwe, O; Levi, M	Micachu feat. Ghostpoet	43:41
17.	"Bread Before Bed"	Sey, K	Kwes	45:04
18.	"Butterflies Rework"	Peters, P; Sey; K	Finn Peters	47:10
19.	"Exi(T)le"	Sey, K	Kwes	50:57

== Personnel ==
- Tracks 3, 5, 7, 10, 12, 15 and 16 – produced by Micachu
- Tracks 2, 6, 8, 11, 13, 17 and 18 – produced by Kwes
- Tracks 9 & 13 – produced by Micachu & The Shapes
- Tracks 4 & 15 – produced by Kwesachu (Kwes & Micachu)
