= Coby Sey =

British musician

- Born: Lewisham, London, United Kingdom
- Origin: Lewisham, London
- Occupations: Artist; musician; songwriter; DJ; radio host; producer
- Instruments: Vocals; bass guitar; electronics; keyboards; drums; percussions
- Years active: 2012–present
- Labels: AD 93; Cardinal Loom; Curl
- Website: cobysey.com

Coby Sey is a British musician, multi-instrumentalist, songwriter, artist, vocalist and NTS Radio host, based in London. Sey released his debut album Conduit, in 2022 on AD 93 to critical acclaim.

== Career ==
Coby Sey has worked with musicians Tirzah, Mica Levi, DELS, Kwes, Laurel Halo, Klein, Lafawndah and London Contemporary Orchestra, artists Hannah Perry and Maëva Berthelot and has remixed Kelly Lee Owens, Max de Wardener and Leifur James. In 2019, he had a featured session on BBC Radio 3 Late Junction in an improvised collaboration with PAN affiliated artist Pan Daijing. Sey is also a founder and member of a collective named Curl with Mica Levi and Brother May, and is one-third of a group named Gaister, with Olivia Salvadori and Bo Ningen's Akihide Monna aka Monchan.

In September 2022, Sey released his debut album Conduit on AD 93 to critical praise.

== Personal life ==
Sey was born in and is based in Lewisham, London. His older brother is the musician Kwes.

== Discography ==
=== Studio albums ===
List of solo studio albums
Title	Album details
Conduit	Released: 9 September 2022; Label: AD 93; Formats: LP, digital download, streaming, cassette tape

=== Collaborative albums ===
List of collaborative studio albums
Title	Album details
Colourgrade (with Tirzah and Mica Levi as Tirzah)	1 October 2021; Label: Domino; Formats: LP, CD, digital download, streaming
GAISTER (with Olivia Salvadori and Akihide Monna as GAISTER)	Released: 1 November 2024; Label: AD 93; Formats: LP, digital download, streaming

=== Extended plays ===
List of solo extended plays
Title	Album details
Whities 010: Transport for Lewisham	Released: 7 April 2017; Label: Whities, (Note: Whities is known as AD 93 as of June 2020.) Young Turks (Note: Young Turks is known as Young as of April 2021.); Formats: 10" EP, digital download, streaming
River	Released: 4 September 2020; Label: Curl; Formats: Digital download, streaming
Passengers	Released: 20 March 2026; Label: Cardinal Loom; Formats: Digital download, streaming

=== Soundtracks ===
List of solo soundtracks
Title	Album details
MASS (Original Motion Picture Soundtrack)	Released: 5 June 2020; Label: Curl; Formats: Digital download, streaming

=== Singles ===
List of singles showing year released and album name
Title	Year	Album
"Shields / I Have To"	2016	Non-album single
"Petals Have Fallen"	2017	Non-album single
"Face"	2018	Passengers
"To"	2020	Passengers
"Permeated Secrets"	2022	Conduit
"Onus"	2022	Conduit

=== Collaborative singles ===
List of collaborative singles as part of a group
Title	Year	Artist(s)	Album/EP/Mixtape
"Sento"	2024	GAISTER (Olivia Salvadori, Akihide Monna & Coby Sey)	GAISTER

=== As featured artist ===
List of guest appearances, with other performing artists, showing year released and album name
Title	Year	Artist(s)	Album/EP/Mixtape
"7-5 (Change)"	2012	Kwesachu (Kwes. & Micachu), Grant Armour, Elan Tamara	Kwesachu Vol. 2
"Devotion"	2018	Tirzah	Devotion
"Alien"	2020	Leifur James	Angel in Disguise
"Oilseed Stone"	2020	Lol K	Born Under a Bad One
"Tighter"	2021	Cosha	Mt. Pleasant
"Hive Mind"	2021	Tirzah	Colourgrade
"So I Can See You"	2022	TONE	So I Can See You
"Splash"	2022	Nadeem Din-Gabisi, Momoko Gill	POOL
"Grasp"	2022	Nosaj Thing, Slauson Malone 1, Sam Gendel	Continua
"Can't Be Unstuck"	2023	TYSON	Sunsetters / Daybreakers
"On Grounds"	2023	Speakers Corner Quartet	Further Out Than The Edge
"Bites"	2023	V/Z (Valentina Magaletti & Zongamin)	Suono Assente
"Belleville"	2023	Laurel Halo	Atlas
"The Graves at Charleroi"	2023	Rainy Miller x Space Afrika	A Grisaille Wedding
"five"	2023	Louis Carnell & Coby Sey	111
"Clean Slate", "Ultimately"	2024	Ben Klock & Fadi Mohem	Layer One
"We Know What Gives"	2024	Moin	You Never End
"Yet To Know The Meaning of Forever"	2025	Loraine James	New Year's Substitution 3
"Stay"	2025	Raisa K	Affectionately
"All Our Knives Are Always Sharp"	2025	Tony Njoku	All Our Knives Are Always Sharp
"Palimpsest"	2025	Alpha Maid, Ben Vince	Is this a queue
"Inner Link"	2026	Carl Gari	Carl Gari
"The Edge"	2026	TYSON	The Edge / Away

=== Remixes ===
Title	Year	Artist(s)	Album/EP
"Marilyn - Coby Sey Remix"	2017	Mount Kimbie	Four Years and One Day
"Melt! (Coby Sey Rework)"	2010	Kelly Lee Owens	Non-album remixes
"Bismuth Dream (Coby Sey Rework)"	2010	Max de Wardener	Detuned Reworks
"Le Malentendu (Tirzah & Coby Sey Version)"	2011	Lafawndah feat. Lala &ce, Tirzah & Coby Sey	The Fifth Season (Versions)
"Corner of my Sky feat. John Cale (Coby Sey Rework)"	2011	Kelly Lee Owens	Inner Song Remix Series
"Aralkum - Coby Sey Remix"	2011	Galya Bisengalieva	Aralkum Remixes
"I Fucked It Up"	2022	Goddess911	I.F.I.U (Remixes)
"All roads lead to London (feat. Coby Sey & Ersatz)"	2023	Jockstrap & Taylor Skye	I<3UQTINVU
"That Can Be Arranged (Coby Sey Remix)"	2025	Tom Vek	We Have Sound Remixes

=== Covers ===
Title	Year	Original Artist(s)	Album/EP
"Kiss From a Rose"	2021	Seal	Non-album single
"Mentions"	2025	HTRK	String of Hearts (Songs of HTRK)

== Videos ==
Song	Year	Director(s)
All Change	2017	Coby Sey and Alex McCullough
Devotion	2018	Akinola "Crackstevens" Davies Jr.
Hive Mind	2021	Leah Walker and Rebecca Salvadori
Permeated Secrets	2022	Eva-Grace Bor
all we got is us in the moment	2023	Rebecca Salvadori
Onus	2023	Lallie Doyle
Stay	2025	Basil Anthony Harewood

== Touring band members aka Continue ==
- Coby Sey – vocals, electric bass, keyboard, electronics
- Momoko Gill – drums, vibraphone
- Leisha Thomas (Alpha Maid) – electric guitar
- Charlie Hope – visuals
- Ben Vince – tenor saxophone
- CJ Calderwood – alto saxophone
- Sébastien Forrester – percussion, vibraphone
