= True Romance (disambiguation) =

True Romance is a 1993 American romance crime film written by Quentin Tarantino and directed by Tony Scott.

True Romance may also refer to:

== Music ==
=== Albums ===
- True Romance (soundtrack), 1993 soundtrack to the film of the same name
- True Romance (Yukari Tamura album), 2003
- True Romance (Golden Silvers album), 2009
- True Romance (Charli XCX album), 2013
- True Romance (Estelle album), 2015

=== Songs ===
- "True Romance" (Motion City Soundtrack song), 2012
- True Romance (Miho Nakayama song), 1996
- "True Romance (True No. 9 Blues)" by Golden Silvers
- "True Romance", song by Silverstein
- "True Romance", a 2019 song by Ashley Tisdale from Symptoms
- "True Romance", a 2023 song by PinkPantheress from Heaven Knows

== Television ==
- "True Romance" (Cracker), a 1995 two-part episode
- "True Romance" (Doctors), a 2005 episode
- "True Romance" (Hangin' with Mr. Cooper), a 1994 episode
- "True Romance", a 2011 episode of Rescue: Special Ops

== See also ==
- Avon True Romance, a twelve-book series of young adult historical romance novels published by Avon Books
- True Love (disambiguation)
