= Meantime (EP) =

EP by Kwes.
- Released: 30 April 2012; 1 May 2012 (U.S.)
- Recorded: 2011–2012 (London, UK)
- Genre: Pop, experimental
- Length: 16:54
- Label: Warp WAP331
- Producer: Kwes.

Kwes. chronology
Kinshasa One Two with DRC Music (2011)	Meantime (2012)	Kwesachu Mixtape Vol.2 (2012)

Singles from Kwes.
- 1. "Bashful" Released: 7 March 2012

Meantime is the second EP by British record producer and musician Kwes. It was released on 30 April 2012 on Warp Records.

== Background ==
The release is a follow-up to his debut EP release No Need To Run. Early demos for Meantime were written and composed as far back as 2008, but were accidentally wiped off his computer. Meantime was completed in January 2012 after finishing production work for DELS' GOB, Speech Debelle's Freedom of Speech, Sunless '97's Making Waves and DRC Music's Kinshasa One Two.

Not being the first record to feature Kwes' vocals, the musical composition of Meantime is marked by Kwes accepting his ability to sing more prominently compared to his previous efforts. "Using my voice and writing about personal events is the most honest-- as well as the hardest-- way of expressing myself. If you caught me two, three, four years ago, I wouldn't have had the balls to do that."

Kwes cited one of his musical heroes Robert Wyatt as someone whose music encouraged him to accept his ability to sing on Meantime.

The record's title refers ambiguously to the location of Kwes' London hometown – and to the record itself as his EP before his planned debut studio album.

Kanye West and his tour DJ Mano sampled Kwes' song 'LGOYH' for Pusha T's track "Who I Am", which features on Pusha T's debut album "My Name Is My Name".

== Composition ==
=== Music and style ===
Meantime has been described by The Guardian's Paul Lester and The Quietus' Kiran Acharya as a meticulous record with a subtle ability to constantly shift between pop to prog-rock and house to R&B. Electronics and computers are used but not intentionally to exude an 'electronic' or cold feel that is said by Lester to be quite commonplace in synth music. "It [Meantime] is as far from cold synth music as you can get – there's a warmth to it, a playfulness and forlorn exuberance that makes it sound as human as any acoustic singer-songwriter record."

=== Lyrical themes ===
Kwes explains that the songs' themes are hopeful in mood, as opposed to being melancholy, because of his acceptance of the idea of imperfection and embracing maturity. "Imperfection is a massive part of me, and now I'm embracing that whole side to everything. Maybe that's why I am a lot happier."

Kwes has also cited Stevie Wonder and Brian Wilson to be direct lyrical influences. Mike Diver of BBC Music complimented Meantime's closer 'LGOYH' for its lasting impression, "marked by some memorable, heartfelt lines, for example: 'worthwhile love is a handful'". Diver also positively compares Kwes' songwriting to Bloc Party's Kele Okereke and the up-tempo pop sensibilities of 'Bashful' to Hot Chip. The theme of unrequited love in 'Honey' takes direct inspiration from the Beach Boys' song Vegetables, which was written by Brian Wilson. "'Honey' is me literally writing from the perspective of a cabbage. I'm looking up to the cupboard and the jar of honey."

== Track listing ==
No.	Title	Length
1.	"Klee"	2:30
2.	"Bashful"	4:10
3.	"Honey"	3:12
4.	"LGOYH"	7:00
Total length:		16:54

== Personnel ==
Credits taken from Discogs.

- Kwes. – Writer, producer, performer, designer
- Kevin Metcalfe – mastering
- Sinem Erkas – typography
