= Whities 010: Transport for Lewisham =

EP by Coby Sey
- Released: 7 April 2017
- Recorded: 2014–2017
- Studio: Lewisham, London
- Length: 15:52
- Label: Whities, Young Turks
- Producer: Coby Sey

Coby Sey chronology
Shields / I Have To (2016)	Whities 010: Transport for Lewisham (2017)	Petals Have Fallen (2017)

Singles from Whities 010: Transport for Lewisham
- 1. "All Change" Released: 31 March 2017; 2. "Active (Peak)" Released: 4 April 2017

Whities 010 (also known as Whities 010: Transport for Lewisham) is the first EP by British musician Coby Sey and the 10th release on Whities (now independent record label AD 93), a then white label imprint of Young Turks (now independent label Young). It was released on 10" vinyl and was limited to 300 copies.

Sey wrote and recorded the EP in the Lewisham, London after years of working behind the scenes with London-based musicians Tirzah, Mica Levi, DELS, Klein and more.

Whities 010: Transport for Lewisham is one of my attempts to sonically distill how my area has informed me subconsciously and also using my area, Lewisham, to metaphorically reflect on several matters of the heart. It took me almost three years to complete after obsessing with creating a sound I can call mine.

== Music videos ==
The music video for "All Change" was released on 31 March 2017. The music video for "Active (Peak)" was released on 31 March 2017. Both videos were directed by Coby Sey and Alex McCullough.

== Track listing ==
All tracks written and produced by Coby Sey.

Whities 010 track listing
No.	Title	Length
1.	"Active (Peak)"	3:05
2.	"All Change"	3:20
3.	"Vestry"	3:20
4.	"Seed (Our Cells Meet)"	2:39
5.	"Ticket"	3:27
Total length:		15:52

== Personnel ==
Credits adapted from liner notes of Whities 010.

- Coby Sey – primary artist, production, instrumentation, photography, mixing, engineering
- Alex McCullough – artwork, design
- Kwes – mixing, engineering
- Matt Colton – mastering
