= Send Me =

2021 song by Tirzah

Single by Tirzah

from the album Colourgrade
- Released: 14 April 2021
- Length: 4:03
- Label: Domino
- Songwriters: Tirzah Mastin; Mica Levi; Coby Sey
- Producer: Mica Levi

Tirzah singles chronology
"Devotion (w/ Coby Sey)" (2018)	"Send Me" (2021)	"Sink In" (2021)

"Send Me" is a song by British musician Tirzah. It was produced by Mica Levi a.k.a. Micachu. The single was released on 14 April 2021. "Send Me" was described as a song being about "recovery, gratitude and new beginnings, presenting a singer having discovered the type of love that is shared between a mother and a child for the first time whilst simultaneously working as an artist."

== Reception ==
The track has been met with positive reviews by music critics such as Pitchfork and Resident Advisor.

== Music video ==
The music video for "Send Me" was released on 14 April 2021. It was directed by Leah Walker and features the work of movement artist ãssia.

== Track listing ==
Digital download
No.	Title	Length
1.	"Send Me"	4:03
