= Devotion (Tirzah album) =

Studio album by Tirzah
- Released: 10 August 2018
- Recorded: 2016–2018
- Studio: Home (London, UK); The Green Room (London, UK); Mr. Punch Studios (London, UK)
- Genre: Pop
- Length: 38:43
- Label: Domino
- Producer: Mica Levi

Tirzah chronology
Make It Up (2015)	Devotion (2018)	Colourgrade (2021)

Singles from Devotion
- 1. "Gladly" Released: 3 March 2018; 2. "Affection" Released: 14 July 2018; 3. "Devotion" Released: 19 July 2018

Professional ratings
Aggregate scores
Source	Rating
AnyDecentMusic?	7.6/10
Metacritic	80/100
Review scores
Source	Rating
AllMusic	4/5 stars
Clash	7/10
Exclaim!	9/10
The Guardian	4/5 stars
The Line of Best Fit	9/10
Pitchfork	8.3/10
Q	4/5 stars
The Skinny	5/5 stars
Uncut	7/10

Devotion is the debut studio album by British musician Tirzah. It was released through Domino on 10 August 2018.

== Reception ==
On review aggregator Metacritic, Devotion received a score of 80/100, indicating "generally favorable reviews". Kevin Lozano for Pitchfork praised it as "a compelling vision of what imperfect pop music can be", comparing the "sparse" songs to Arthur Russell, and referring to "Devotion" as "excruciatingly emotional". In a positive review for The Skinny, Nadia Younes said that it is "open", "intricate", and "fiercely unique ... one of the most crucial pop records of the year". Writing for PopMatters, Mark Matousek expressed support for Mica Levi's production work on the album and the pair's collaborations prior to Devotion, but says that Tirzah's contributions here cause "dilution" to the instrumentals and criticizes her lyrical obscurity.

== Track listing ==
All tracks are written by Tirzah Mastin and Mica Levi, except where noted.

No.	Title	Writer(s)	Length
1.	"Fine Again"		2:53
2.	"Do You Know"		3:37
3.	"Gladly"		3:41
4.	"Holding On"		3:19
5.	"Affection"		3:41
6.	"Basic Need"		3:20
7.	"Guilty"		2:54
8.	"Devotion" (featuring Coby Sey)	Mastin; Levi; Coby Sey	4:14
9.	"Go Now"		3:06
10.	"Say When"		4:07
11.	"Reach Hi"		3:51
Total length:			38:43

== Personnel ==
- Tirzah – primary artist, vocals
- Mica Levi – production, mixing
- Coby Sey – featured artist (track 8)
- Kwes – mixing, engineering
- Alexis Smith – engineering
- Christian Wright – mastering

== Charts ==
Chart (2018)	Peak position
UK Official Record Store Chart (OCC)	29
UK Independent Albums (OCC)	22
UK Independent Albums Breakers Chart (OCC)	6
UK R&B Albums (OCC)	5
