= Songs for Midi =

EP by Kwes
- Released: 5 April 2018
- Recorded: 2017–2018 (London, United Kingdom)
- Genre: Pop, experimental, instrumental
- Length: 22:06
- Label: Warp
- Producer: Kwes

Kwes chronology
Ilp (2013)	Songs for Midi (2018)

Professional ratings
Review scores
Source	Rating
Pitchfork	7.5/10
Resident Advisor	3.8/5

Songs for Midi is the third EP by producer Kwes. It was released on 5 April 2018, on Warp.

== Track listing ==
All tracks are written by Kwes.

No.	Title	Length
1.	"Midori"	4:25
2.	"Trike"	3:28
3.	"Ungry/Milk"	3:46
4.	"99flake"	3:46
5.	"Hometime"	2:32
6.	"Blox/Connor"	4:09
Total length:		22:06
