= Quarter Turns over a Living Line =

Studio album by Raime
- Released: November 19, 2012
- Genre: Dark ambient, post-industrial, drone, experimental
- Length: 37:48
- Label: Blackest Ever Black

Raime chronology
Raime EP (2010)	Quarter Turns over a Living Line (2012)	Tooth (2016)

Quarter Turns over a Living Line is the debut studio album by the London-based duo Raime, consisting of Joe Andrews and Tom Halstead. The album was released on November 19, 2012, by the British label Blackest Ever Black.

The album differs from the band's previous works and the other albums of the genre in its use of live instruments, such as cello and drums. Quarter Turns over a Living Line was praised by music critics and appeared on various publications' lists of the best albums of the year. It allowed the band who was previously known in the underground circles to reach mainstream audience and gave Raime the opportunity to start touring and performing worldwide.

== Recording ==
While working on the album, the duo separately from each other recorded a large amount of "sketches". Unlike their previous works and most other albums in the genre, on Quarter Turns over a Living Line they included the recordings of live instruments such as cello, guitar, and drums. Raime also recorded more traditional industrial sounds, which included field recordings in warehouses and under railway arches. The duo noted that it was important for them to not use any pre-recorded sounds to make the album sound raw and unpredictable.

After they finished the recording process, the duo would meet in their home studio, where they would spend hours listening to all the recorded material and compiling it into the album's tracks. Joe Andrews combined working on the album with his full-time job at a record distributors. In an interview with The Guardian he expands on his daily routine during the album's recording:

"I always look pretty tired, that's my general look, but I was going to work a zombie. I was getting up at six to get to work an hour early so I could leave early to go to the studio, doing that until 1am, and going home. And then through the weekends. By the end, my whole body and mind was just utterly wasted."

== Reception ==
Professional ratings
Aggregate scores
Source	Rating
Metacritic	82/100
Review scores
Source	Rating
AllMusic	4.5/5 stars
Beats Per Minute	82%
Exclaim!	8/10
Fact	4/5 stars
Pitchfork	7.2/10
Resident Advisor	4/5
Tiny Mix Tapes	5/5 stars
Uncut	7/10

Quarter Turns over a Living Line received positive reviews from music critics. At Metacritic, which assigns a normalized rating out of 100 to reviews from mainstream publications, the album received an average score of 82, based on 11 reviews. According to AllMusic, the album was a "remarkable success" that "saw [the band] break out of the underground to become firm mainstream favorites". Following the album's success, the duo started touring and performing worldwide.

Aneet Nijjar of AllMusic praised the album, calling it "the sound of shadows lurking, the sound of a thousand crashing cars, the sound of flesh ripping on steel", while also commending unusual for the genre use of live instruments. Vincent Pollard of Exclaim! called it an "astonishing album" which stands alone from anything else released that year and a "terrifying journey". Steve Shaw, writing for Fact magazine, said that Quarter Turns over a Living Line is "both powerful in its execution of an idea, but also quite sure of its own modest signature" and that its sound separates it from other industrial and drone albums. Pitchfork's Nick Neyland wrote that "the seven tracks here have the cold ripple of alienation and abandon pulsing through them" and called it a "logical endpoint for dubstep", reminiscent of post-rock. Harry Sword of The Quietus described the album as "a slow journey inwards" into "ever darker and transcendent spaces". Resident Advisor's Angus Finlayson, comparing the album to the duo's previous work, called it "more expansive, more ambitious and more accomplished", complimenting the use of live instruments and the change of pace. Tiny Mix Tapes praised the album and its "broadening of musical depth", along with the album's use of live instruments and its "shadowed and daunting environment".

=== Accolades ===
Several publications included Quarter Turns over a Living Line in their lists of the best albums of 2012. It appeared on Tiny Mix Tapes' list at number 49, Resident Advisor's list at number 20, The Quietus's list at number 32, and The Wire's list at number 38.

== Track listing ==
No.	Title	Length
1.	"Passed Over Trail"	4:30
2.	"The Last Foundry"	5:52
3.	"Soil and Colts"	5:42
4.	"Exist in the Repeat of Practice"	5:28
5.	"The Walker in Blast and Bottle"	5:11
6.	"Your Cast Will Tire"	5:31
7.	"The Dimming of Road and Rights"	5:34
Total length:		37:48

== Personnel ==
Credits are adapted from the album's liner notes.

- Tom Halstead – songwriting, production
- Joe Andrews – songwriting, production
- Celia Sadie – cello
- Amy Hurst – drums
- Valentina Magaletti – drums
- Matt Colton – mastering
- Rosie Terry – photography
- William Oliver – photography
- Oliver Smith – design
