= ILP =

ILP can refer to:

== Computer science ==
- Inductive logic programming
- Information Leak Prevention
- Instruction-level parallelism
- Integer linear programming

== Other ==
- ilp., a 2013 album by Kwes
- Independent Labour Party, United Kingdom
- Independent Living Program, a US Veteran Affairs program aimed at making sure that each eligible veteran is able to live independently
- Index Librorum Prohibitorum, the list of publications banned by the Catholic Church between 1559 and 1966.
- Individual Learning Plan, a teaching methodology
- Inner Line Permit, a permission required for mainland Indian citizens to be able to travel into a restricted/protected state of North-East India
- Institution of Lighting Professionals, a professional lighting association based in the UK and Ireland.
- Intelligence-led policing
- Isolated Limb Perfusion, a limb-sparing, neoadjuvant therapy for soft tissue sarcomas
