= Sink In (Tirzah song) =

2021 song by Tirzah

Single by Tirzah

from the album Colourgrade
- Released: 20 May 2021
- Length: 4:34
- Label: Domino
- Songwriter(s): Tirzah Mastin; Mica Levi; Coby Sey
- Producer(s): Mica Levi

Tirzah singles chronology
"Send Me" (2021)	"Sink In" (2021)

"Sink In" is a song by British musician Tirzah. It was produced by Mica Levi aka Micachu. The single was released on 20 May 2021. "Sink In" was described as a song being "forming somewhat of a blank page, ready to be filled in.

== Music video ==
The video for "Sink In" features a dance performance with choreography by Lewis Walker and Tylor Deyn, and was directed by Leah Walker, who also did the video for “Send Me."

== Track listing ==
Digital download
No.	Title	Length
1.	"Sink In"	4:34
