= Gob (Dels album) =

GOB

Studio album by DELS
- Released: 2 May 2011
- Recorded: 2010–2011 (Ipswich & London, UK)
- Genre: Hip hop; electronic
- Length: 39:08
- Label: Big Dada; Ninja Tune; BD179
- Producer: Joe Goddard; Micachu; Kwes.

DELS chronology
GOB (2011)	Petals Have Fallen (2014)

Singles from GOB
- 1. "Shapeshift" Released: 23 August 2010; 2. "Trumpalump" Released: 29 November 2010; 3. "GOB" Released: 25 April 2011; 4. "Capsize" Released: 16 May 2011

Professional ratings
Review scores
Source	Rating
The Sunday Times	5/5 stars
The Guardian	4/5 stars
Drowned in Sound	8/10 stars
This is Fake DIY	8/10 stars
BBC Music	(very positive)
Q Magazine	8/10 stars
Financial Times	4/5 stars
God is in the TV	4.5/5 stars
MOJO	8/10 stars
NME	7/10 stars

GOB is the first studio album by British rapper/graphic designer DELS, released on 2 May 2011. The album was recorded between 2009 and 2011 in London and in Dels' studio at his mother's house in Ipswich. It was produced by Joe Goddard of Hot Chip, alongside Micachu and Kwes.

== Reception ==
Upon its release, 'GOB' has received good reviews from music critics. The website Metacritic has given the album an aggregated score of 80/100.

== Track listing ==
=== Compact Disc/Digital Album ===
No.	Title	Writer(s)	Producer(s)	Length
1.	"Hydronenburg"	Dickins, Kieren; Sey, Kwesi	Kwes.	2:45
2.	"Trumpalump" (featuring Joe Goddard)	Dickins, K; Goddard, J	Joe Goddard	3:57
3.	"Shapeshift"	Dickins, K; Goddard, J	Joe Goddard	3:50
4.	"Moonshining"	Dickins, K; Sey, K	Kwes.	3:31
5.	"Eating Clouds"	Dickins, K; Sey, K	Kwes.	4:14
6.	"Melting Patterns"	Dickins, K; Levi, Mica	Micachu	2:32
7.	"Capsize" (featuring Joe Goddard and Roots Manuva)	Dickins, K; Goddard, J; Smith, Rodney	Joe Goddard	3:59
8.	"Violina / Bread Before Bed"	Dickins, K; Levi, M; Sey, K	Micachu; Kwes.	3:55
9.	"DLR" (featuring Elan Tamara)	Dickins, K; Sey, K; Mottley, Elan Tamara	Kwes.	3:36
10.	"Droogs"	Dickins, K; Sey, K	Kwes.	3:19
11.	"GOB"	Dickins, K; Sey, K; Mottley, E.T	Kwes.	3:32
12.	"Trumpalump (Quiet Remix)" (featuring Ghostpoet and Joe Goddard) – (Bonus Track)	Dickins, K; Goddard, J; Jimiwe, O	Joe Goddard	4:41

=== Vinyl LP ===
Double album vinyl LP release.

Side one
No.	Title	Length
1.	"Hydronenburg"
2.	"Trumpalump" (featuring Joe Goddard)
3.	"Shapeshift"

Side two
No.	Title	Length
4.	"Moonshining"
5.	"Eating Clouds"
6.	"Melting Patterns"

Side three
No.	Title	Length
7.	"Capsize" (featuring Joe Goddard & Roots Manuva)
8.	"Violina / Bread Before Bed"
9.	"DLR" (featuring Elan Tamara)

Side four
No.	Title	Length
10.	"Droogs"
11.	"GOB"

== Personnel ==
- Dels – Vocals
- Tracks 1, 4, 5, 8, 9, 10 and 11 - produced by Kwes.
- Tracks 3 and 7 - additional production by Kwes.
- Tracks 2, 3, 7 and 12 - produced by Joe Goddard
- Tracks 6 and 8 - produced by Micachu
- Joe Goddard - Guest vocalist
- Elan Tamara - Guest vocalist
- Roots Manuva - Guest vocalist
- Ghostpoet - Guest vocalist
- Mixed by Bob Earland
- Mastered By Kevin Metcalfe
- Vocals recorded by Elijah Turay
- Art Direction by Us Design Studio & Dels
- A&R - Will Ashon
