= River (EP) =

EP by Coby Sey
- Released: 4 September 2020
- Recorded: 2020
- Studio: Westfjords, Iceland
- Length: 10:48
- Label: Curl
- Producer: Coby Sey

Coby Sey chronology
MASS (Original Motion Picture Soundtrack) (2020)	River (2020)	Conduit (2022)

River is the second EP by British musician Coby Sey. Sey wrote and recorded the EP in the Westfjords region in Iceland in February 2020, as cases of COVID-19 grew worldwide. The sixth track, "River ⟳" consists of the first five tracks uninterrupted.

== Track listing ==
All tracks written and produced by Coby Sey.

River track listing
No.	Title	Length
1.	"Nsu"	1:40
2.	"Þingeyri, Vestfirðir"	3:14
3.	"Ísafjörður, Vestfirðir"	1:49
4.	"Tamesis"	2:12
5.	"Nile"	1:51
Total length:		10:48

Extra track
No.	Title	Length
6.	"River ⟳"	10:48

== Personnel ==
- Coby Sey – primary artist, production, instrumentation, artwork, art direction, photography, photography direction, mixing, engineering
