= Tru Love =

Tru Love may refer to:

- Tru Love (film), a 2013 Canadian film
- "Tru Love" (song), a 2005 song by Faith Evans

== See also ==
- True Love (disambiguation)
