= Mizz Beats =

- Born: Iman Yanée
- Origin: London, England
- Genres: Grime, hip hop, R&B, Wonky, Broken Beat, Dubstep
- Occupations: Record producer, songwriter, DJ, composer, executive producer
- Instruments: Keyboards, various
- Years active: 2004–present
- Website: https://www.imanyanee.com/

Mizz Beats (real name: Iman Yanee) is a record producer and DJ from London. She has collaborated with Skepta, Dizzee Rascal and Roots Manuva, D Smoke, Sir (singer), Tiffany Gouché, Terrace Martin

== Discography ==
=== Singles and EPs ===
- "Purple Love"/"Test" collaboration with Silkie (Deep Medi Musik, 2009)
- "My World"/"The Jester" (Deep Medi Musik, 2010)
- Are We the Dictators? EP (Eglo Records, 2011)
- Pimpin white label EP (Eglo Records, 2011)

=== Appearances ===
- "Blue Night" from the DJ/rupture and Matt Shadetek mix Solar Life Raft (theAgriculture, 2009)

=== Production credits ===
- "Signal" by D Double E (2004)
- "Colossal Insight" (Jammer & Mizz Beats Remix) by Roots Manuva (Big Dada, 2004)
- "Saw It Coming" by Wiley feat. Jammer, JME, Ears & Syer (679 Recordings / Boy Better Know, 2005)
- "Hoodie" (Mizz Beats Remix feat. Skepta, JME, Jammer, Ears & Baby Blue) by Lady Sovereign (Island Records / Chocolate Industries, 2005)
- "Dean" by Dizzee Rascal (XL Recordings, 2007)
- "R U Listning?" by Ears (Jahmektheworld, 2007)
- "Purple Love" by Silkie & Mizz Beats (Deep Medi, 2009)
- "Riot!" by D Smoke & SiR - Rebel (Woodworks, 2012)
- "Up & Down" by Fat Ron & SiR - 80 Dollars (Woodworks, 2014)
- "LL Cool Whip" by D Smoke - (Woodworks, 2014)
- "Boozhie" by D Smoke feat. Sha'Lea Nikole & Fat Ron (Woodworks, 2014)
- "149" by DELS (Big Dada, 2014)
- "Honey Jack" by D Smoke feat. Terrace Martin - Inglewood High (Woodworks, 2019)
