= Lafawndah =

French singer

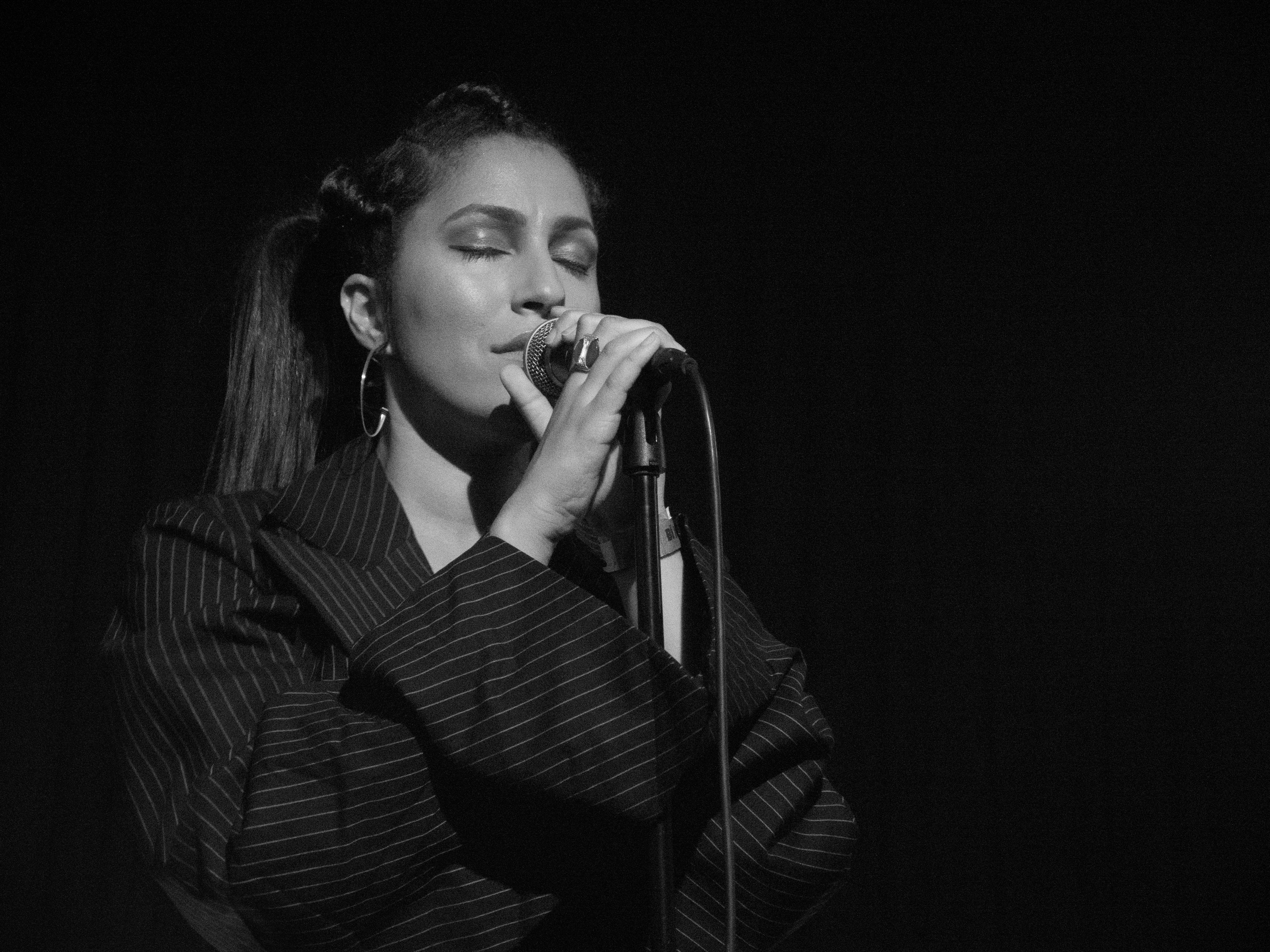
- Lafawndah in 2016

Background information
- Also known as: Kukii
- Born: Yasmine Dubois; Paris, France
- Genres: Experimental; avant-pop
- Years active: 2010–present
- Labels: Concordia; !K7; Latency; Warp
- Website: lafawndah.com

Yasmine Dubois, known professionally as Lafawndah and also as Kukii (stylized in all caps), is a French singer, songwriter, producer and director.

== Early life ==
Lafawndah was born raised in Paris, France, and is of Egyptian, Iranian, and English descent. She has lived across the world in various cities, including Los Angeles, Mexico City and London.

== Career ==
During her time in Mexico City, Lafawndah co-founded the girl group NIDADA. After a term at the Red Bull Music Academy, she recorded and co-produced her self-titled EP Lafawndah with Garagem Banda, which was self-released in 2014.

In 2016 Lafawndah's Tan EP was released on Warp Records. The project was created with contributions from L-Vis 1990 and Nick Weiss of Teengirl Fantasy.

In 2018 Dubois partnered with Midori Takada to create the multimedia piece Le Renard Bleu, Takada's first release for almost twenty years. Centred around Le Renard Bleu, Takada and Lafawndah produced their stage work Ceremonial Blue, which was performed at the Barbican in London during the spring of 2019.

In 2019 Lafawndah's debut album Ancestor Boy was released on her own label Concordia, and distributed by !K7. Ancestor Boy was a highly collaborative project, with features from Kelsey Lu, Julie Byrne, Gaika, ADR, L-Vis 1990, Jon Hassell, Valentina Magaletti, Jamie Woon, Joao Filipe, and Bonnie Banane, plus a cover of 'Vous et Nous' by Brigitte Fontaine and Areski Belkacem. The album received critical acclaim, and was on multiple 'album of the year' lists for 2019.

The Fifth Season, Lafawndah's second album was released on 8 September 2020. Once again she worked with tuba player Theon Cross, trombonist Nathaniel Cross, Valentina Magaletti on percussion, Nick Weiss on keyboard and production, plus a guest appearance from Lala &ce. Lyrics of the lead single "You, At The End" come from a poem by the artist Kae Tempest, and The Fifth Season also includes a cover of Don't Despair by Beverly Glenn-Copeland.

Lafawndah has had an extensive touring career, taking her theatrical live shows around the world. She has also toured with Kelela in both 2015 and 2017, and supported the American band Hundred Waters. In 2018 Dubois adapted her Honey Colony mixtape in to an ongoing concert experience which made its debut at the Southbank Centre, including guests such as Tirzah (feat. Mica Levi and Coby Sey), Kelsey Lu and Elheist. She has released two bootleg-style Honey Colony mixtapes to date featuring reworkings of songs around vocal stems from artists such as Klein, Kelela, Kelsey Lu, Cardi B, and Bonnie Banane.

In addition to her own music, Lafawndah has produced and composed for brands such as Kenzo, Chanel, i-D, Courreges, and has also directed her own music videos.

== Discography ==
=== Studio albums ===
Title	Release date	Album details
Ancestor Boy	22 March 2019	Label - Concordia • !K7; Format(s) - Vinyl, CD, digital download
The Fifth Season	8 September 2020	Label - Latency; Format(s) - Vinyl, digital download

=== EPs and remix albums ===
Title	Release date	Album details
Lafawndah	6 May 2014	Self-released; Format(s) - Digital download
Tan	5 February 2016	Label - Warp; Format(s) - Vinyl, digital download
Le Renard Bleu	9 July 2018	Midori Takada & Lafawndah; Label - !K7; Format(s) - Vinyl, digital download
Ancestor Boy II	6 December 2019	Label - Concordia • !K7; Format(s) - digital download
The Fifth Season (Versions)	16 June 2021	Label - Latency; Format(s) - digital download

=== Singles ===
Title	Release date	Album
"Town Crier"	5 February 2016	Tan
"Joseph"	4 October 2018	Ancestor Boy
"Daddy"	14 January 2019	Ancestor Boy
"Substancia"	22 February 2019	Ancestor Boy
"Storm Chaser (Cobra Rasteira) x Linn Da Quebrada x Pininga Rework"	12 November 2019	Ancestor Boy II
"Rare Baby" (as Kukii)	27 June 2024	TBA

=== Remixes ===
Title	Artists	Release date
"Due West (Lafawndah Remix)"	Kelsey Lu	15 November 2019
"Vietnam (Lafawndah Remix)"	Tricky	11 March 2021
