= Truelove =

Truelove may refer to:

== Ships ==
- Truelove (1764 ship), a whaler and cargo ship
- The Truelove, ship featured in the novel Clarissa Oakes (sold under the title of The Truelove in the US)

== People ==
- Amanda Truelove (born 1961), cellist from the United Kingdom
- Ayala Truelove (born 1975), Israeli international football striker
- Denver V. Truelove (1919–1943), American bombardier
- Edward Truelove (1809–1899), English radical publisher
- George Truelove (born 1975), professional UK rugby player
- Jack Truelove (born 1995), English football player
- John Truelove (born 1968), British record producer
- Owen Truelove (1937–2006), first man to fly from the UK to New Zealand with a motor glider
- William Truelove, Canadian admiral

== Other ==
- Truelove (TV series), 2024 British TV series
- Truelove's Gutter, 2009 album by Richard Hawley
- Truelove Eyre, legendary founder of the Eyre and Ayre family

== See also ==
- True Love (disambiguation)
