= Trip9love =

Studio album by Tirzah
- Released: 5 September 2023
- Studios: Tirzah's and Mica Levi's home studios
- Length: 33:04
- Label: Domino
- Producer: Mica Levi

Tirzah chronology
Colourgrade (2021)	Trip9love (2023)

Trip9love (stylised as trip9love...???) is the third studio album by English singer-songwriter Tirzah. It was surprise-released digitally on 5 September 2023, and released physically on 17 November, by Domino Recording Company. The album was produced by Mica Levi.

== Recording ==
The album was written and recorded in Tirzah's and Levi's home studios, as well as in southeast London and Kent, over about a year's time.

== Release ==
Trip9love was surprise-released digitally on 5 September 2023 without any prior singles. Tirzah had said she would be "sharing the record next week" on 29 August. Along with the digital release, a physical release by Domino Recording Company was announced to follow on 17 November. The album tease in August came with the announcement of tour dates in Europe and North America, but the North American leg was cancelled after Tirzah contracted pneumonia.

== Style ==
The central instruments of the album are the piano and drum machine. Most songs on the album are built on the same drum beat, with different mixing and distortion applied to each to differentiate them, while a few are drumless ballads. The piano's tone is also very consistent track to track. The two instruments contrast with each other, with Pitchfork's Philip Sherburne calling the piano "distant and mournful" and the drums "confrontational, in your face, charged with latent violence."

== Reception ==
Trip9love ratings
Aggregate scores
Source	Rating
Metacritic	85/100
Review scores
Source	Rating
Clash	7/10
Jenesaispop	4/5 stars
The Line of Best Fit	9/10
Mojo	4/5 stars
MusicOMH	4.5/5 stars
Pitchfork	7.8/10

According to the review aggregator Metacritic, Trip9love received "universal acclaim" based on a weighted average score of 85 out of 100 from 6 critic scores. Sherburne called the album "tender as a bruise, the kind of bruise you press down on now and again, just to confirm that it still hurts—and to take secret pleasure in the ache." Clash's Ana Lamond wrote that "it is within the intricacies of Tirzah and Levi's union that the record truly gleams." Resident Advisor's Kiana Mickles wrote that "The effect of a wrong note pressed, a one-take vocal run or a perfectly misplaced guitar screech might seem inconsequential because, at this point, it's so indisputably Tirzah. But real care goes into her rule-breaking, which is what makes it sound so immaculate." Bandcamp Daily's Diamond Sharp wrote that Tirzah's "delicate vocals pair well over the warbled 808s and distorted beats", and called the album "raw and ever-changing."

Critics emphasised the need for multiple listens to fully grasp the album. Sherburne said it took him "a dozen or more listens" to notice the repeated drum pattern.

=== Year-end lists ===
Trip9love on year-end lists
Publication	#	Ref.
DJ Mag	—N/a	
Gorilla vs. Bear	13	
Les Inrockuptibles	8	
The Line of Best Fit	44	
Loud and Quiet	10	
Resident Advisor	—N/a	
Time Out	9	
The Washington Post	6	

== Track listing ==
All tracks are written by Tirzah Mastin and Mica Levi. All tracks are produced by Levi.

Trip9love track listing
No.	Title	Length
1.	"F22"	3:38
2.	"Promises"	2:37
3.	"U All the Time"	4:12
4.	"Their Love"	2:32
5.	"No Limit"	3:02
6.	"Today"	2:44
7.	"Stars"	3:20
8.	"He Made"	2:48
9.	"2 D I C U V"	3:31
10.	"6 Phrazes"	1:33
11.	"Nightmare"	3:02
Total length:		33:04

== Personnel ==
- Tirzah – vocals
- Mica Levi – producer

== Charts ==
Chart	Peak position
UK Album Downloads (Official Charts)	82
UK Independent Albums Breakers (Official Charts)	17
