= Conduit (Coby Sey album) =

Studio album by Coby Sey
- Released: 9 September 2022
- Recorded: 2017–2021
- Studio: Lewisham, London; Hackney, London
- Length: 37:35
- Label: AD 93
- Producer: Coby Sey

Coby Sey chronology
River (2021)	Conduit (2022)

Singles from Conduit
- 1. "Permeated Secrets" Released: 21 June 2022; 2. "Onus" Released: 3 August 2022

Conduit is the debut studio album by British musician Coby Sey. It was released through AD 93 on 9 September 2022. The album features Sey on vocals, multiple instruments and production, with instrumental contributions from Ben Vince, Biu Rainey and Good Sad Happy Bad members Raisa Khan and CJ Calderwood. The album was supported by singles "Permeated Secrets" and "Onus".

== Touring ==
Sey toured through Europe intermittently to support the album before, during and after its release in 2022 and 2023 with a rotating band of musicians consisting of Leisha Thomas (Alpha Maid), Ben Vince, CJ Calderwood (of Good Sad Happy Bad), Momoko Gill and lighting artist Charlie Hope. and Musician Sébastien Forrester and lighting artist Tasya Nafagina joined for some shows in Europe. This included several music festival appearances including Pitchfork Festival in London, Rewire Festival in The Hague and Le Guess Who in Utrecht alongside movement artist Maëva Berthelot.

Sey was also the supporting act for three dates of Grouper's 2022 European tour in Dublin, London and Viseu.

Sey collaborated with composers George Barton and Robert Ames to perform a special version of the album's closing track "Eve (Anwummerɛ)" with the BBC Concert Orchestra at Bluedot Festival in Cheshire.

This was later followed by Sey's first tour in Australia in June 2024 including Rising Festival and Miscellania in Naarm/Melbourne and Phoenix Central Park in Gadigal/Sydney.

== Accolades ==
=== Semester-end lists ===
Country	Publication	List	Rank	Ref.
UK	Resident Advisor	The 10 Best Albums of September 2022	--	
UK	The Quietus	The 8 Best Albums of September 2022	--	
US	PopMatters	The 10 Best Hip-Hop Albums of September 2022	--	
US	Bandcamp Daily	Album of the Day 2022	--	

=== Year-end lists ===
Country	Publication	List	Rank	Ref.
US	Pitchfork	The 50 Best Electronic Albums of 2022	6	
UK	Boomkat	Top Releases 2022	4	
UK	Bleep	Top 100 Albums of the Year 2022	4	
UK	The Wire	Rewind: Top 50 Releases of 2022	22	
UK	The Wire	Rewind: 2022 Electronic Releases of the Year	4	
UK	God Is in the TV	Nick Roseblade's Musical Memories of 2022	1	
UK	BBC Radio 3 Late Junction	2022 Albums of the Year	-	
Japan	ele-king	Top 30 2022 Albums of the Year	2	

== Track listing ==
Conduit track listing
No.	Title	Writer(s)	Producer(s)	Length
1.	"Etym"	Coby Sey; Raisa Miriam Khan	Sey	4:16
2.	"Mist Through The Bits" (feat. Raisa K)	Sey	Sey	2:27
3.	"Permeated Secrets"	Sey	Sey	3:25
4.	"Dial Square (Confront)"	Sey	Sey	3:18
5.	"Night Ride"	Sey	Sey	4:56
6.	"Onus"	Sey	Sey	3:14
7.	"Response" (feat. Ben Vince, CJ Calderwood and Biu Rainey)	Sey; Vince; Calderwood; Rainey	Sey	10:06
8.	"Eve (Anwummerɛ)"	Sey	Sey	5:59
Total length:				37:35

Cassette edition bonus tracks
No.	Title	Writer(s)	Producer(s)	Length
9.	"Night Walk"	Sey	Sey	3:05
10.	"Pilgrimage"	Sey	Sey	2:04
Total length:				43:00

== Personnel ==
Credits adapted from liner notes of Conduit.

=== Musicians ===
- Coby Sey – primary artist, instrumentation, vocals, electronics, electric bass, drums, keyboards, percussion
- CJ Calderwood – featured artist, (track 7), alto saxophone (track 1-2, 7)
- Raisa K – featured artist, (track 2), electronic percussion (track 1-2)
- Biu Rainey – featured artist, (track 7), electric guitar (track 1-2, 7)
- Ben Vince – featured artist, (track 7) tenor saxophone (track 1-2, 7)

=== Technical personnel ===
- Coby Sey – production, mixing, engineering

=== Artwork ===
- Coby Sey – artwork, art direction, photography, photography direction
- Ksenia Burnasheva – photography, photography direction
- Tasker – art direction
- Nicola Tirabasso – art direction
- Kassian Troyer – mastering

== Release history ==
Region	Date	Format	Label	Ref.
Various	9 September 2022	LP; streaming; digital download	AD 93	
Various	22 December 2022	Cassette tape	AD 93	
