= Gladly =

2018 song by Tirzah

Single by Tirzah

from the album Devotion
- Released: 3 March 2018
- Length: 4:14
- Label: Domino
- Songwriter(s): Tirzah Mastin; Mica Levi
- Producer(s): Mica Levi

Tirzah singles chronology
"GO (w/ Micachu)" (2016)	"Gladly" (2018)	"Obviously (with Micachu as Taz & Meeks)" (2018)

"Gladly" is a song by British musician Tirzah. It was produced by Mica Levi. The single was released on 3 March 2018.

== Reception ==
The track has been met with positive reviews by music critics such as Pitchfork and The Guardian.

== Music video ==
The music video for "Gladly" was released on 3 May 2018. It was directed by Hannah Perry.

== Track listing ==
Digital download
No.	Title	Length
1.	"Gladly"	3:41
