= So I Can See You =

2022 debut album of Tone

So I Can See You is the debut full-length album of Tone, the performance name of British musician Basil Anthony Harewood. It was released on the independent label Rhythm Section International in March 2022. It was recorded at night during Tone's daughter’s birth using a Tascam 38 tape machine in a Hither Green studio shared with Mica Levi and Coby Sey. The album features collaborators including Sey, Fran Lobo, Roxanne Tataei, and Marc Pell. It received reviews in Resident Advisor, KEXP, and The Line of Best Fit.
