= True Love =

True Love may refer to:

== Film and television ==
- True Love (1989 film), directed by Nancy Savoca
- True Love (1992 film), starring Jacky Cheung
- "True Love" (Dawson's Creek), a 2000 television episode
- True Love (Once Removed), a 2004 British film starring Sean Harris
- True Love (2004 film), an LGBT-related film by Kyi Soe Tun
- "True Love" (The Tudors), a 2007 television episode
- True Love (TV series), a 2012 British television series
- True Love (2012 film), directed by Enrico Clerico Nasino
- Aashiqui: True Love, a 2015 Indian film by Ashok Pati

== Literature ==
- "True love's kiss," a common motif used in fairy tales
- "True Love" (short story), by Isaac Asimov
- The Truelove, the US title of Clarissa Oakes by Patrick O'Brian
- True Love (manga), a 2013 manga series by Miwako Sugiyama
- True Love (book), a 2014 book by Jennifer Lopez

== Music ==
=== Albums ===
- True Love (Crystal Gayle album), 1982
- True Love (The Desert Rose Band album), 1991
- True Love (Jessy J album), 2009
- True Love (Pat Benatar album), 1991
- True Love (Toots & the Maytals album), 2004
- True Love, 2017 album by Charlotte Hatherley

=== Songs ===
- "True Love" (Coldplay song), 2014
- "True Love" (Cole Porter song), 1956
- "True Love" (Destinee & Paris song), 2011
- "True Love" (Don Williams song), 1991
- "True Love" (Fumiya Fujii song), 1993
- "True Love" (Glenn Frey song), 1988
- "True Love" (Joan Armatrading song), 1992
- "True Love" (Pink song), 2013
- "True Love" (Robert Palmer song), 1999
- "True Love" (Kanye West and XXXTentacion song), 2022
- "True Love's Kiss" (song), a 2007 song from the Disney film Enchanted
- "True Love", by Al Green from He Is the Light
- "True Love", by Angels & Airwaves from I-Empire
- "True Love", by Ariana Grande from Christmas & Chill
- "True Love", by Bobby Vinton from Roses Are Red
- "True Love" by Cane Hill from Smile
- "True Love", by Debbie Gibson from Ms. Vocalist
- "True Love", by Dove Cameron from Liv and Maddie: Music from the TV Series
- "True Love", by Ellen Reid from Cinderellen
- "True Love", by Elton John from Duets
- "True Love", by Elliott Smith from From a Basement on the Hill
- "True Love", by Elvis Presley from Loving You
- "True Love", by Fred Frith from The 20th Anniversary of the Summer of Love 1987–1967
- "True Love", by Friendly Fires from Pala
- "True Love", by George Harrison from Thirty Three & 1/3
- "True Love", by Irene Cara from Anyone Can See
- "True Love", by Jade Warrior from Now
- "True Love", by Jefferson Airplane from Jefferson Airplane
- "True Love", by Kem from Album II
- "True Love", by The Legendary Pink Dots from Any Day Now
- "True Love", by Lil' Romeo from Game Time
- "True Love", by Madina Lake from From Them, Through Us, to You
- "True Love", by Marie Osmond from Magic of Christmas
- "True Love", by Mark Mallman
- "True Love", by Martha Davis from ...So the Story Goes
- "True Love", by Melissa Tkautz from Lost & Found
- "True Love", by Patti Murin from Frozen (2018)
- "True Love", by Phil Wickham from Cannons
- "True Love", by The Reivers from Saturday
- "True Love", by Ric Ocasek from This Side of Paradise
- "True Love", by Rufus and Chaka Chan from Camouflage
- "True Love", by Sizzla from Rise to the Occasion
- "True Love", by Stevie Wonder from A Time to Love
- "True Love", by Thomas Anders from Different
- "True Love", by Troy Hudson featuring Ray J from Undrafted
- "True Love", by Vince Gill from The Things That Matter
- "True Love", by Wang Chung from Points on the Curve
- "True Love 1980", a song by Ash from A–Z Series
- "True Love (Comes Only Once in a Lifetime)", a song by Eric Burdon & The Animals from Eric Is Here
- "True Love (Never Goes Out of Style)", a song by Beverley Mahood from Girl Out of the Ordinary
- "True Love, True Love", a song by Connie Francis from Connie Francis Sings Folk Song Favorites

== Other uses ==
- True Love (video game), a 1995 Japanese erotic visual novel
- True to Love, a South Korean drama series broadcast by MBC in 1999

== See also ==
- Romance
- Love (disambiguation)
- Tru Love (disambiguation)
- True Love Waits (disambiguation)
- "True Love Ways", a 1960 song by Buddy Holly
- True Romance (disambiguation)
- Truelove (disambiguation)
