= Tirzah (musician) =

English singer-songwriter

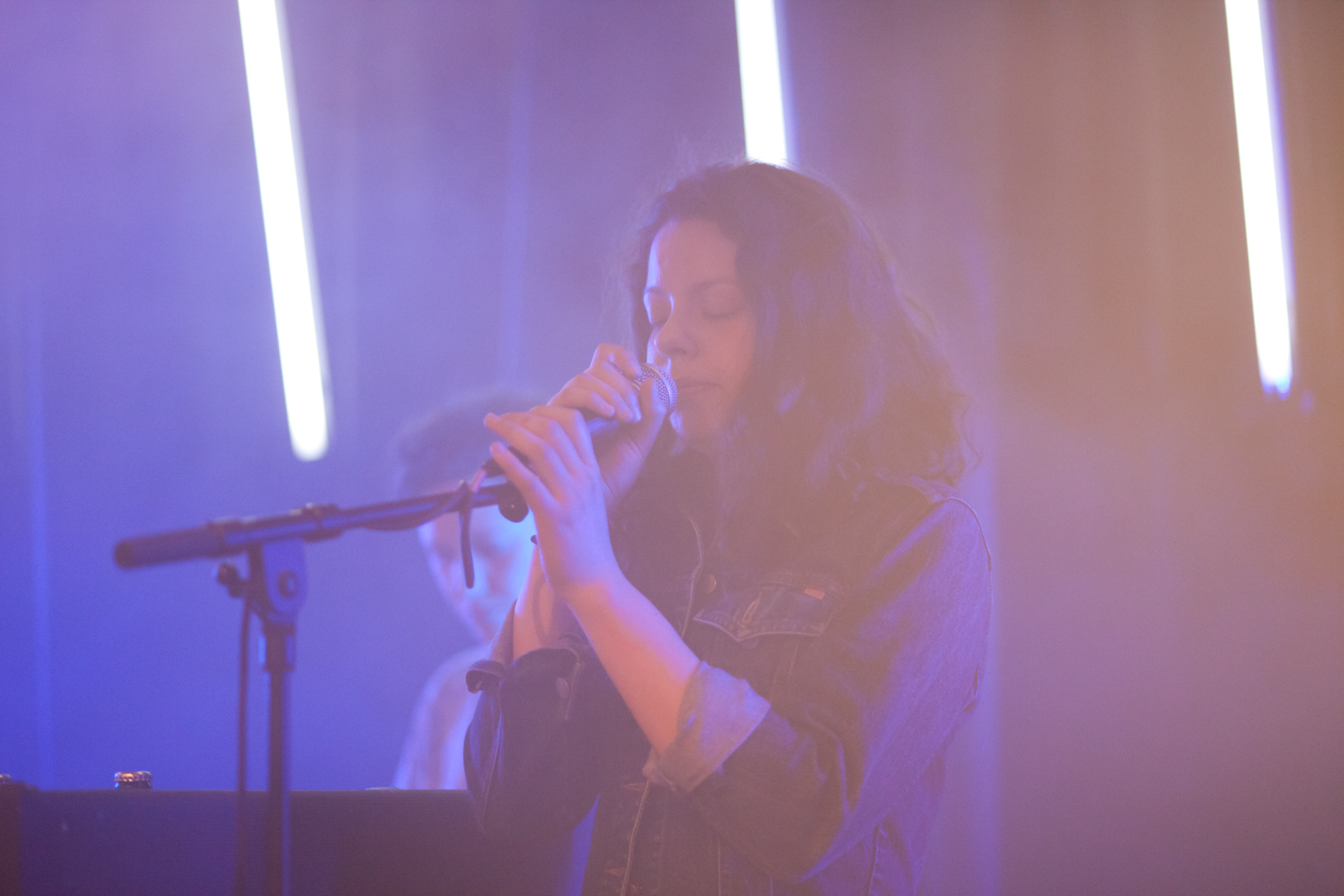
- Tirzah at the 2014 Crossing Europe Film Festival, Linz

Background information
- Born: Tirzah Miriam Lois Mastin; 1987 (age 38–39); Braintree, Essex, England
- Origin: Essex; London
- Occupations: Singer-songwriter; recording artist
- Years active: 2006–present
- Labels: Domino; Greco-Roman
- Website: tirzah.uk

Tirzah Miriam Lois Mastin, better known mononymously as Tirzah is an English singer-songwriter. Her first solo record, the EP I'm Not Dancing, was released in 2013 on Greco-Roman. Her debut studio album, Devotion, was released in 2018 on Domino. Her second studio album Colourgrade was released in 2021 and her third trip9love followed in 2023, both also on Domino. She has collaborated frequently with musician Mica Levi and Coby Sey, and has contributed to works by Tricky, Kwes, Dels, Mura Masa, Blood Orange and others.

== Early life ==
Mastin was born in Braintree, Essex as the youngest of five children. After growing up playing the Celtic harp, she attended the Purcell School for Young Musicians in Bushey, Hertfordshire with frequent collaborator Mica Levi where she trained as a harpist. Mastin then went on to study fashion.

== Career ==
On 5 August 2013, Mastin released her first EP, I'm Not Dancing, on Greco-Roman Records. Resident Advisor noted of Mastin's unique songwriting, "[Mastin's music] is charmingly ramshackle, the antithesis to the label's radio-friendly polish—but the strong songcraft is still there". The EP was made in collaboration with frequent collaborator and friend Mica Levi, who has helped produce all of Mastin's subsequent releases.

The following year on 14 April 2014, Mastin released a second EP, No Romance. In their review of the EP, The Line of Best Fit touched upon Mastin's minimalist musical style: "Sad, detached, yet strangely warm vocals and excellent minimal production demonstrate just how much can be achieved with very, very little".

On 10 August 2018, Mastin released her debut album, Devotion, on Domino Records. Pitchfork gave the album a positive review, remarking, "[Devotion] is a compelling vision of what imperfect pop music can be—joyful in both sound and feeling precisely because both seem so out-of-step and asymmetrical". Frequent collaborator and friend Mica Levi produced the album.

On 1 October 2021, Mastin released her second album, Colourgrade. Mastin described the collaboration with Levi as "closer to representing what we always worked on". Coby Sey also features on numerous tracks on he album. In their review of the album, Stereogum noted that "[Colourgrade] speaks to the rich emotions and deep hues of a life fully lived. It's a bold step into the experimental realm, intentionally more avant-garde and darker than her previous releases".

On 5 September 2023, Mastin released her third and most recent album, Trip9love, with Levi returning as a collaborator. Clash gave the album a positive review, noting, "[Trip9love] marks yet another turning point, a project that explores the dynamics between grandeur and minimalism... The result is a mood-focussed collection of tracks that urge to be listened to all as one, differentiating themselves through the subtleties of atmosphere, melodies and vocal performance".

== Songwriting ==
In an interview with The Pomegranate London, Mastin commented on the themes in her music, saying:

"I do naturally write more about human thoughts and emotions. They’re universal and are of particular interest to me. Love is also always a reoccurring exploration. Across different creative mediums, inspiration for songwriting is generally more insular whereas inspiration for live shows opens up interest in dance, theatre, art, lighting design and other live music shows. It takes a lot of fine tuning, and usually feels ‘ready’ when you’re at the end of the tour!".

== Personal life ==
Mastin has two children with musician Giles Kwakeulati King-Ashong, also known by his stage name Kwake Bass. They currently reside in Sidcup, London.

== Discography ==
=== Studio albums ===
Title	Album details
Devotion	Release date: 10 August 2018; Label: Domino
Colourgrade	Release date: 1 October 2021; Label: Domino
Trip9love	Release date: 5 September 2023; Label: Domino

=== EPs ===
- I'm Not Dancing (2013)
- No Romance (2014)

=== Singles ===
- "I'm Not Dancing" (2013)
- "Malfunction (2014)
- "Make It Up" (2015)
- "What's The Use" (2015)
- "Gladly" (2018)
- "Obviously" (2018) (with Micachu as 'Taz & Meeks')
- "Affection" (2018)
- "Devotion" (2018) (feat. Coby Sey)
- "Send Me" (2021)
- "Sink In" (2021)
- "Tectonic" (2021)
- "Hive Mind" (2021) (feat. Coby Sey)
- "Ribs" (2022)

=== Collaborative and featured tracks ===
- "Sun Down" (2014) (Tricky feat. Tirzah)
- "Silly Games" (2014) (Tricky feat. Tirzah)
- "Petals Have Fallen" (2014) (Dels feat. Tirzah)
- "Thinking of You" (2015) (Nozinja, Micachu, Tirzah and Mumdance)
- "Way from Me" (2016) (Baauer feat. Tirzah)
- "GO" (2016) (Micachu with Tirzah)
- "Dare You" (2016) (Micachu with Tirzah)
- "trip6love" (2016) (Micachu with Tirzah)
- "Obviously" (2018) (with Micachu as Taz & Meeks)
- "Today" (2020) (Mura Masa with Tirzah)
- "Le Malentendu" (2021) (Lafawndah, Lala &ce, Tirzah and Coby Sey)
- "1471" (2022) (Babyfather feat. Tirzah)
- "fix" (2023) (Speakers Corner Quartet feat. Tirzah)
- "Open Up" (2023) (Kwes feat. Sampha and Tirzah)
- "Life" (2025) (Blood Orange feat. Tirzah & Charlotte Dos Santos)
- "Miles" (2026) (Cold & Jawnino feat. Tirzah)

== Awards and nominations ==
Organization	Year	Category	Nominated work	Result	Ref.
AIM Independent Music Awards	2022	Best Difficult Second Album	Colourgrade	Nominated	
