= Ilp =

ilp.

Studio album by Kwes
- Released: 14 October 2013; 15 October 2013 (U.S.)
- Recorded: Studiobokkle (London, UK)
- Genre: Free-pop, experimental, psychedelic
- Length: 38:41
- Label: Warp WARP243
- Producer: Kwes.

Kwes chronology
Kwesachu Mixtape Vol.2 (2012)	ilp. (2013)	ilpix. (2014)

Singles from Kwes.
- 1. "Rollerblades" Released: 26 November 2012; 2. "36" Released: 13 August 2013

ilp. (/ɪlp/) is the debut album by British record producer and musician Kwes. It was released on 14 October 2013 on Warp Records. The release is a follow-up to his second EP release Meantime. The record's title ilp refers literally to the record being Kwes' first studio album.

== Critical reception ==
Professional ratings
Aggregate scores
Source	Rating
Metacritic	76/100
Review scores
Source	Rating
Allmusic	4.5/5 stars
musicOMH	4.5/5 stars
Exclaim!	9/10
The Sunday Times	Very Favourable
PopMatters	8/10
The Guardian	4/5 stars
Dummy	8/10
Dots & Dashes	8/10
Clash	7/10
NME	7/10

ilp. received generally positive reviews from music critics. At Metacritic, which assigns a rating out of 100 to reviews from mainstream critics, the album received an average score of 76, which indicates "generally favourable acclaim". Al Kennedy of PopMatters said that ilp. can be described as "tender, innocent and heartfelt but not twee, cheesy or overtly sentimental". Kennedy further states in that "Kwes' ilp. is to pop what Jamie Lidell's Jim was to soul".

In a review for The Guardian, Alexis Petridis noted that "there's an appealing sense of understatement on ilp., you can clearly here it in his voice, which is beautiful but low key, almost conversational. It's the exact opposite of showy. The understatement seeps into the music as well. There's nothing showy or grandstanding about the way it shifts in between styles."

Alan Ashton-Smith of musicOMH compliments Kwes' composition and songwriting on ilp. "The fact that he's a pop artist signed to Warp is perhaps the best way of summing up what he does: he's constantly pushing the envelope, but his music has a comforting, familiar – and indeed an enveloping – feel. Many of them might be unorthodox experimental pop songs, but there's something very authentic about every track here. All the effects and unexpected structures seem to be nothing but completely honest expressions of what Kwes is trying to say."

== Track listing ==
All music is composed by Kwes.

No.	Title	Length
1.	"Purplehands"	5:15
2.	"36"	4:05
3.	"Rollerblades"	3:45
4.	"Cablecar"	8:02
5.	"Flower"	4:37
6.	"Hives"	3:30
7.	"Broke"	4:26
8.	"Chagall"	2:43
9.	"Parakeet"	1:58

=== Bonus track for CD and Digital ===
No.	Title	Length
10.	"B_shf_l"	4:10
Total length:		42:51

== Personnel ==
Credits taken from Discogs.

- Kwes. – artist, writer, producer, performer, design
- Sinem Erkas – typography
- Kevin Metcalfe mastering
- Studio Moross – design
- Stephanie Sian Smith – photography
