= Colourgrade =

Studio album by Tirzah
- Released: 1 October 2021
- Recorded: 2019–2021
- Studio: The Room Studios (London, UK)
- Genre: Experimental pop; alternative R&B; ambient pop
- Length: 41:03
- Label: Domino
- Producer: Mica Levi

Tirzah chronology
Devotion (2018)	Colourgrade (2021)	Trip9love (2023)

Singles from Colourgrade
- 1. "Send Me" Released: 14 April 2021; 2. "Sink In" Released: 20 May 2021; 3. "Tectonic" Released: 24 June 2021; 4. "Hive Mind" Released: 8 September 2021

Colourgrade is the second studio album by British musician Tirzah. It was released through Domino on 1 October 2021.

== Accolades ==
Colourgrade on year-end lists
Publication	List	Rank	Ref.
Pitchfork	The 50 Best Albums of 2021	13	
The Guardian	The 50 Best Albums of 2021	17	

Professional ratings
Aggregate scores
Source	Rating
Metacritic	81/100
Review scores
Source	Rating
Pitchfork	8.5/10

== Track listing ==
Colourgrade track listing
No.	Title	Writer(s)	Producer(s)	Length
1.	"Colourgrade"	Tirzah Mastin; Mica Levi	Mica Levi	2:58
2.	"Tectonic"	Mastin; Levi; Coby Sey	Levi	4:37
3.	"Hive Mind" (featuring Coby Sey)	Mastin; Levi; Sey	Levi	4:05
4.	"Recipe"	Mastin; Giles Kwakeulati King-Ashong; Dean Blunt	Kwake Bass; Dean Blunt	2:35
5.	"Beating"	Mastin; Levi	Levi	3:41
6.	"Sleeping"	Mastin; Levi	Levi	3:26
7.	"Crepuscular Rays"	Mastin; Levi; Sey	Levi	6:33
8.	"Send Me"	Mastin; Levi; Sey	Levi	4:03
9.	"Sink In"	Mastin; Levi; Sey	Levi	3:57
10.	"Hips"	Mastin; Levi	Levi	5:03
Total length:				41:03

== Personnel ==
- Tirzah – primary artist, design
- Mica Levi – production, mixing (track 1–3, 5–8, 10), engineering
- Coby Sey – featured artist, (track 3)
- Kwake Bass – production (track 4), engineering
- Dean Blunt – production (track 4)
- Kwes – mixing (tracks 4, 9)
- Heba Kadry – mastering
- Leah Walker – photography, design
- Matthew Cooper – design

== Charts ==
Chart (2021)	Peak position
UK Independent Albums (OCC)	6
UK Independent Albums Breakers Chart (OCC)	2
UK Official Record Store Chart (OCC)	3
Scottish Albums (OCC)	44
UK R&B Albums (OCC)	3
