= Kelly Lee Owens (album) =

Studio album by Kelly Lee Owens
- Released: 24 March 2017
- Genre: Minimal techno; dream pop; ambient; drone; krautrock; electropop
- Length: 46:22
- Label: Smalltown Supersound
- Producer: Kelly Lee Owens

Kelly Lee Owens chronology
| Oleic (2016) | Kelly Lee Owens (2017) | Inner Song (2020) |

Singles from Kelly Lee Owens
- 1. "CBM" Released: 8 September 2016; 2. "Anxi." Released: 18 January 2017; 3. "Lucid" Released: 9 February 2017

Kelly Lee Owens is the debut studio album by Welsh electronic musician Kelly Lee Owens. It was released on 24 March 2017, by Smalltown Supersound.

== Critical reception ==
Professional ratings
Aggregate scores
| Source | Rating |
|---|---|
| Metacritic | 79/100 |
Review scores
| Source | Rating |
| AllMusic | 3.5/5 stars |
| Clash | 8/10 |
| Exclaim! | 9/10 |
| The Line of Best Fit | 8/10 |
| Pitchfork | 8.0/10 |
| Resident Advisor | 3.8/5 |

Kelly Lee Owens was well received by critics. Philip Sherburne of Pitchfork reviewed "Kelly Lee Owens is a message in a bottle that’s come bobbing back from somewhere in the future." Stephen Carlick of Exclaim! said "These are layered, atmospheric tracks that blend minimal techno, dream-pop, Krautrock and ambient drone into a dazzling, alchemical whole that defies easy categorization."

== Track listing ==
All tracks written by Kelly Lee Owens.

| No. | Title | Length |
|---|---|---|
| 1. | "S.O" | 3:12 |
| 2. | "Arthur" | 4:05 |
| 3. | "Anxi." (featuring Jenny Hval) | 3:47 |
| 4. | "Lucid" | 3:32 |
| 5. | "Evolution" | 4:02 |
| 6. | "Bird" | 5:15 |
| 7. | "Throwing Lines" | 3:07 |
| 8. | "CBM" | 5:00 |
| 9. | "Keep Walking" | 4:43 |
| 10. | "8" | 9:39 |

Extended version
| No. | Title | Length |
|---|---|---|
| 11. | "Spaces" | 3:43 |
| 12. | "Pull" | 3:22 |
| 13. | "1 of 3" | 3:21 |
