= No Need to Run =

EP by Kwes
- Released: 28 June 2010
- Recorded: 2010 (London, United Kingdom)
- Genre: Pop, experimental, instrumental
- Length: 11:35
- Label: Young Turks
- Producer: Kwes.

Kwes chronology
| Kwesachu Mixtape Vol.1 (2009) | No Need to Run (2010) | Kinshasa One Two (2011) |

No Need to Run is the second solo release after the debut single "Hearts in Home"/"Tissues" and the first EP by producer and synaesthetic Kwes. It was released on 28 June 2010, on XL imprint Young Turks. The record has been described as a 'concoction of found sounds, synthetic noises, objects and instruments', and a 'collection of instrumental music for both mind and body'.

== Track listing ==
| No. | Title | Writer(s) | Length |
|---|---|---|---|
| 1. | "Hundertwasser" | Kwes. | 1:41 |
| 2. | "In & Out the UK" | Kwes. | 2:57 |
| 3. | "Canary" | Kwes. | 1:17 |
| 4. | "No Need to Run" | Kwes. | 6:20 |
| Total length: | | | 11:35 |
