= Raime =

British experimental music group

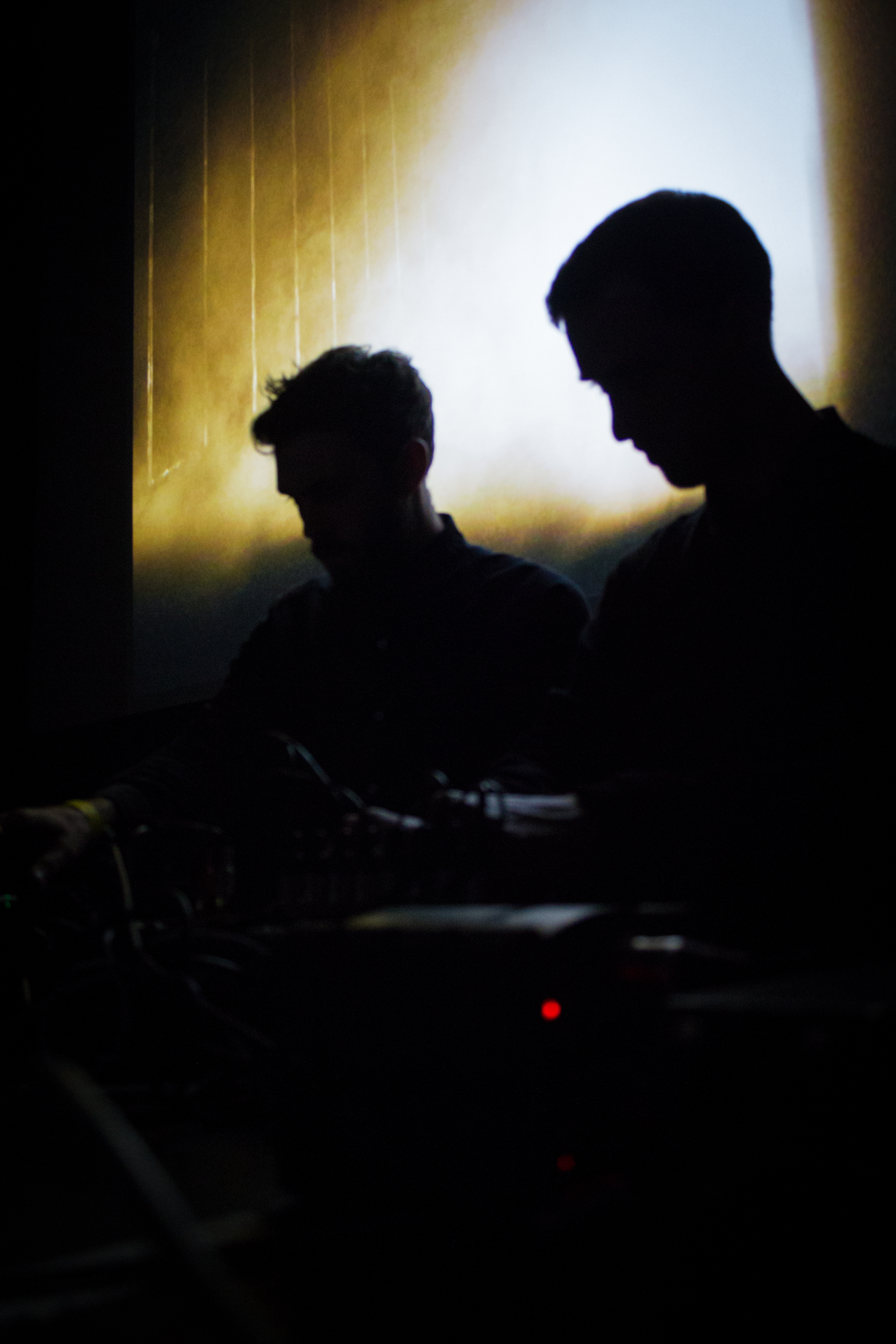
- Raime performing at Sonic Acts 2013 festival in Amsterdam, Netherlands

Background information
- Origin: London, England
- Genres: Post-industrial; dark ambient; post-punk; experimental music
- Years active: 2008–present
- Labels: Blackest Ever Black; Reel Torque; Different Circles; RR; AD 93
- Spinoffs: Moin
- Members: Joe Andrews; Tom Halstead
- Website: www.raimemusic.com

Raime are an English experimental music band from London. Formed by childhood friends Joe Andrews and Tom Halstead circa 2008, the duo released their first EP, Raime EP, in 2010. Their debut studio album, 2012's Quarter Turns over a Living Line, was met with widespread critical acclaim and landed on multiple lists of best albums of the year. Since then Raime released multiple EPs and singles. In 2021 they were joined by their long-time collaborator, drummer Valentina Magaletti to form the group Moin. As a trio, they released three studio albums: Moot! in 2021, Paste in 2022 and You Never End in 2024.

== History ==
Joe Andrews and Tom Halstead had known each other since they were teens, when they were making music independently and were sharing records with each other. In a 2012 interview with The Quietus Tom Halstead said it was four or five years prior to the interview when they realized they "kind of shared visions" and started making music together.

The duo released their debut EP called Raime EP in September 2010 on Blackest Ever Black label. It contained three tracks which were based on obscure samples from goth, industrial and post-punk records. Raime EP received considerable acclaim from music critics.

After releasing a few 12-inch singles in 2010 and 2011, in 2012 Raime released their debut studio album Quarter Turns over a Living Line. The album saw the duo move away from the traditional for the genre use of samples towards live instruments. According to AllMusic, the album was a "remarkable success" that "saw them break out of the underground to become firm mainstream favorites". Quarter Turns over a Living Line appeared on various publications' lists of the best albums of the year. The album's success allowed the duo to start touring and performing worldwide.

Shortly before the release of Quarter Turns over a Living Line, in October 2012, the duo, under the name Moin, anonymously released the 7-inch single "Positive / Elsie" with Pete Swanson of Yellow Swans. In 2013 Raime confirmed they were behind the Moin project. In September of that year the duo released a new EP as Moin titled Moin (sometimes called Moin EP or just EP).

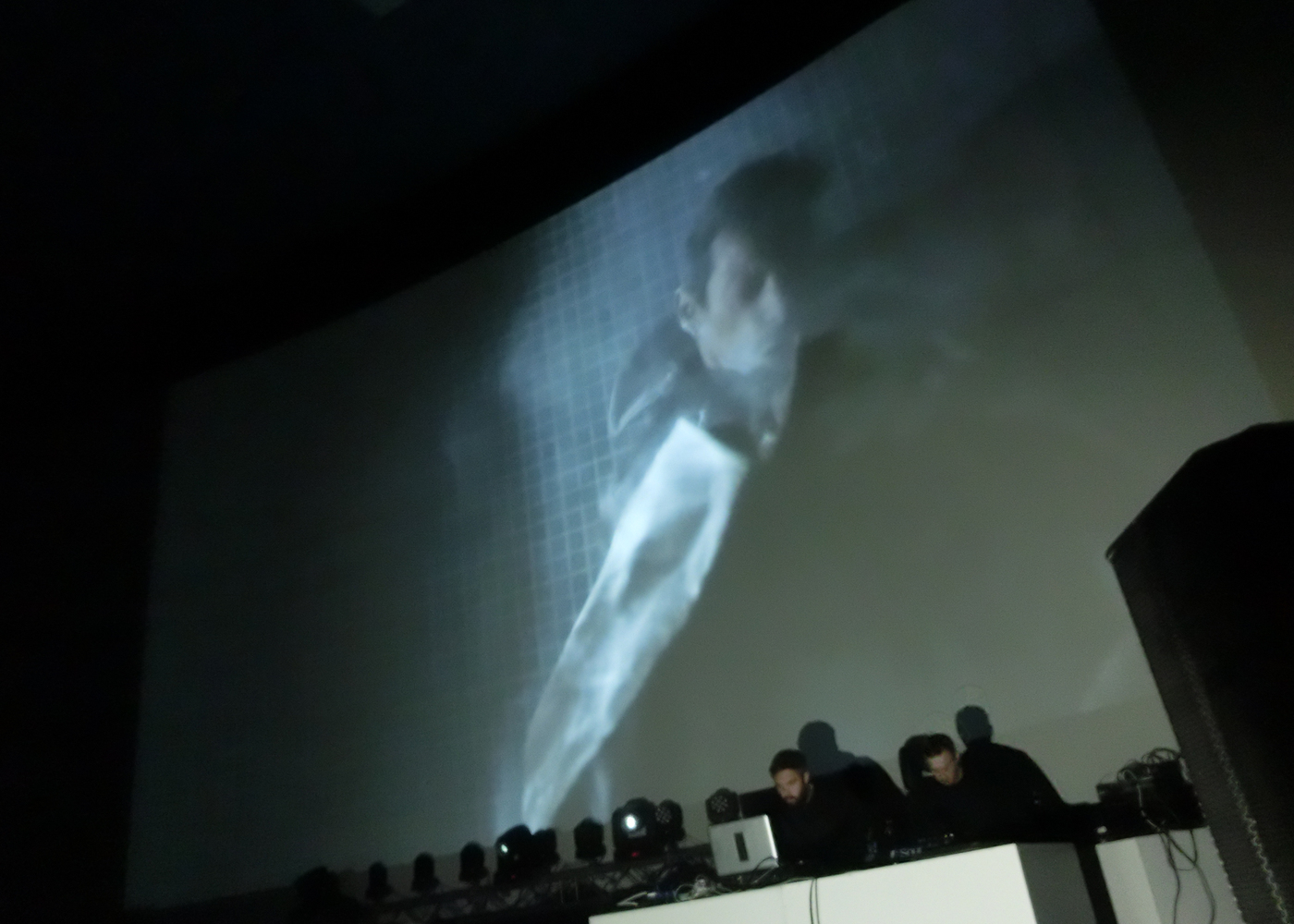
Raime performing in Saint Petersburg, Russia, November 2013

Raime's second studio album, Tooth, was released on Blackest Ever Black in 2016. The album was met favorably by the music critics, although some critics noted Tooth wasn't as varied and as inventive as their debut.

In June 2018 the band released Am I Using Content or Is Content Using Me? on Different Circles label. The label is known for its "weightless grime", which combines grime and ambient music, and the EP is built around this sound. In October 2018 the duo launched their own label named RR. The debut release of the label was their EP We Can't Be That Far From the Beginning, released the same month. Sonically, it built upon their previous EP. The EP was followed by Planted, released on RR in 2019.

In 2021 the band returned to their Moin project. This time they were joined by their long-time collaborator, drummer Valentina Magaletti. In July 2021 they released Moin's debut studio album Moot! on AD 93 label. Music critics praised the album's mix of dance-punk drums, post-punk, and post-hardcore aesthetics. The trio continued to employ this style on their follow-up album, Paste, which was released on AD 93 in October 2022.

== Discography ==
=== Studio albums ===
- Quarter Turns over a Living Line (2012)
- Tooth (2016)
- Moot! (2021) (with Valentina Magaletti as Moin)
- Paste (2022) (with Valentina Magaletti as Moin)
- You Never End (2024) (with Valentina Magaletti as Moin)

=== Extended plays ===
- Raime EP (2010)
- Moin (2013) (as Moin)
- Am I Using Content or Is Content Using Me? (2018)
- We Can't Be That Far From the Beginning (2018)
- Planted (2019)
