= Kelly Lee Owens =

Welsh electronic musician and producer

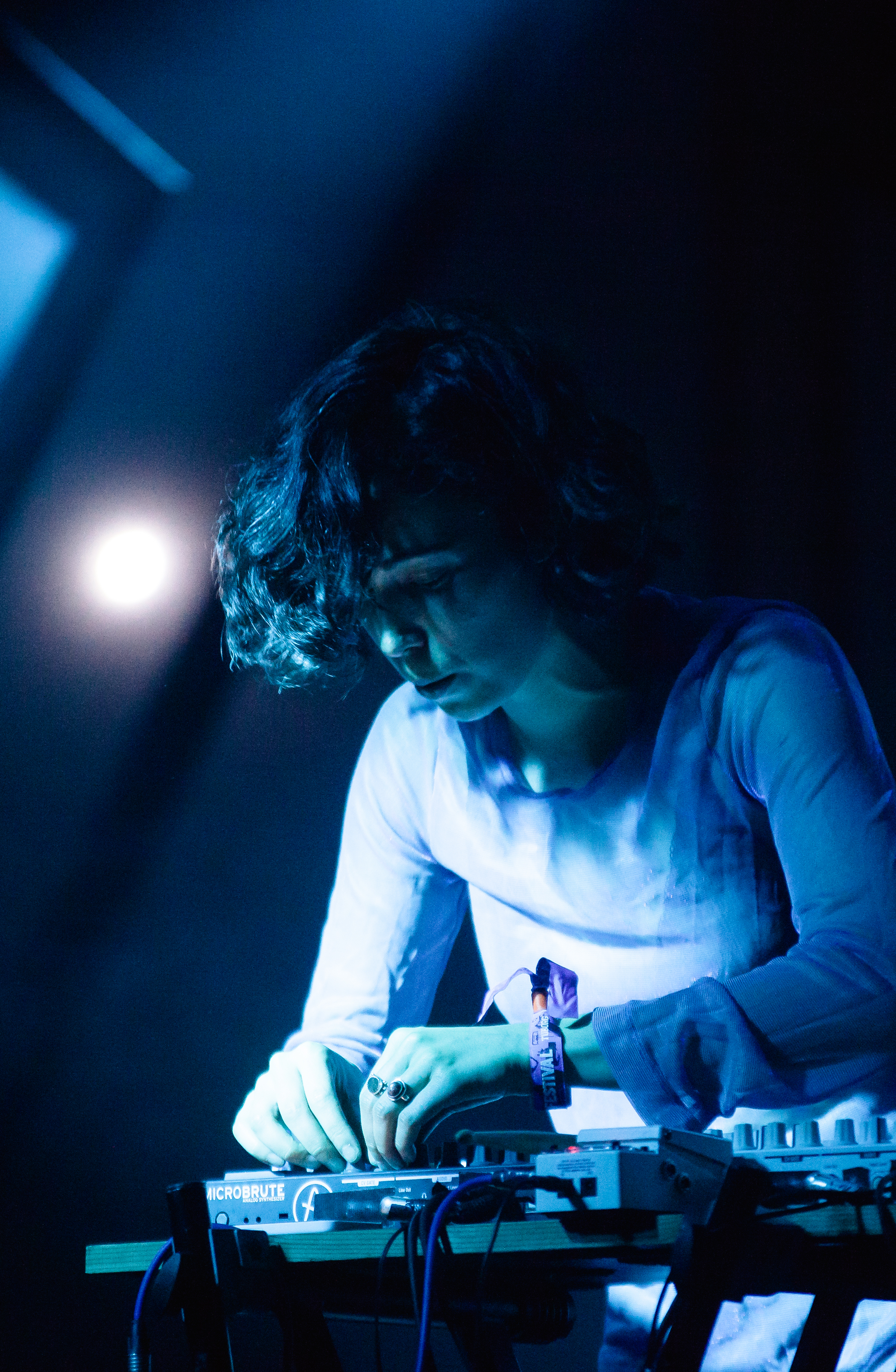
- Owens in 2018 performing at Roskilde Festival in Denmark

Background information
- Born: 24 August 1988 (age 38); Rhuddlan, Clwyd, Wales
- Genres: Techno; dream pop; electronic
- Occupations: Musician; singer; producer
- Years active: 2014–present
- Labels: dh2; Smalltown Supersound
- Website: kellyleeowens.com

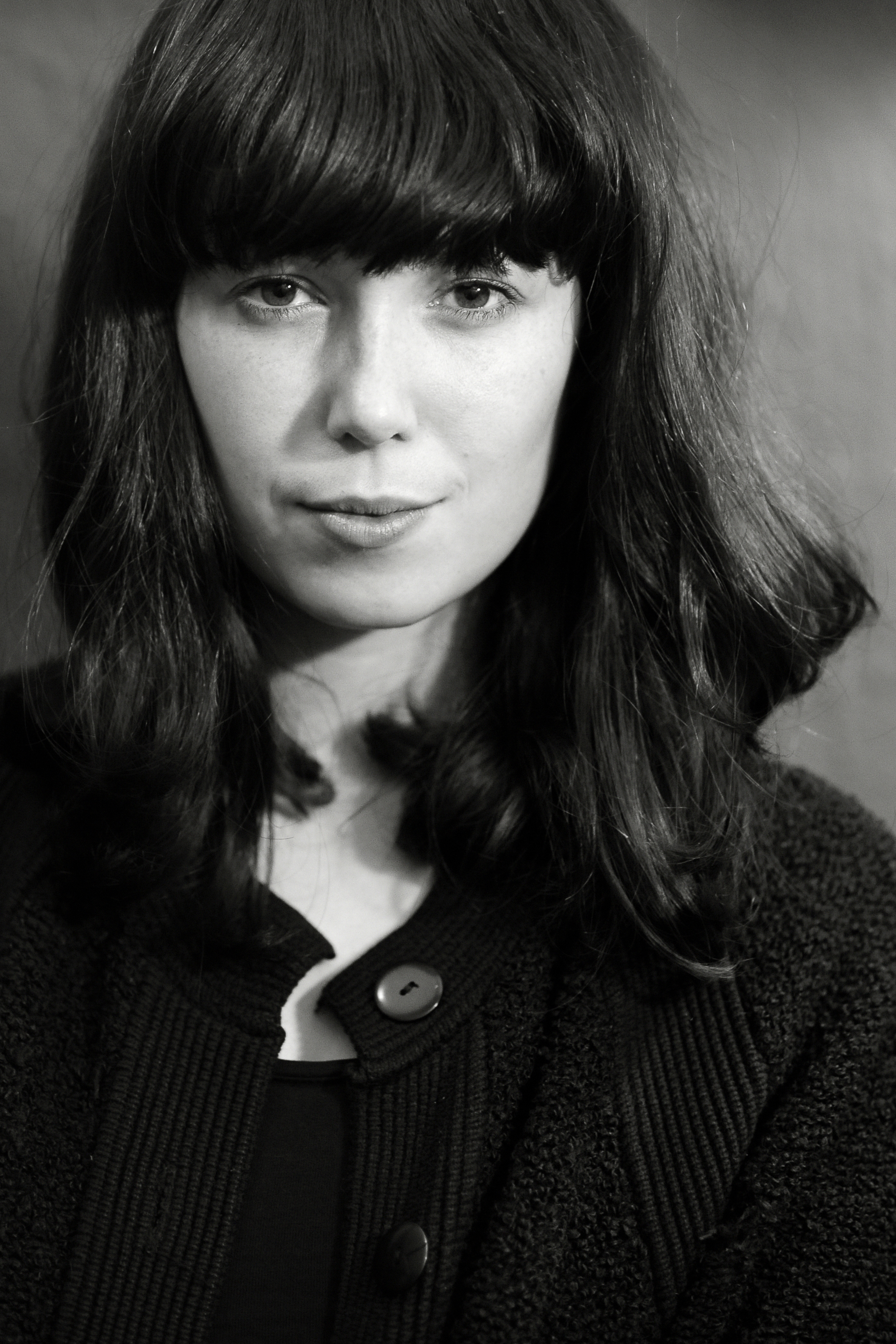
Owens in 2013

Kelly Lee Owens (born 24 August 1988) is a Welsh electronic musician and producer. She released her self-titled debut album in March 2017 to critical praise. Her sophomore album, Inner Song, was released in August 2020, followed by LP.8 in April 2022 and Dreamstate in October 2024.

== Early life ==
Owens was born on 24 August 1988 in Rhuddlan, Clwyd, on the North Wales coast. Owens recalls writing poetry as a child and that being out in nature (in her mother's fields) gave her the time and the solitude to write. As a teenager, she sang in her school choir and played bass and drums.

Owens grew up in a nearby small village where, she describes, "everyone knows everyone else." She began working at 14 as a waitress and spent her teenage years "involved in the 2006/2007 indie scene".

At age 19, Owens moved from Wales to Manchester to work at a cancer treatment hospital. While working as an auxiliary nurse, Owens would use her paid leave to help run local indie festivals. It was the patients who would ultimately urge her to pursue her music career.

== Career ==
Owens left her career as an auxiliary nurse in a cancer ward in Manchester to pursue music in 2009. After moving to London, she interned at XL Recordings and worked at various record stores including Pure Groove. During that time, Owens played bass in the indie band The History of Apple Pie.

It was during those early days in London that Owens met Daniel Avery, James Greenwood (aka "Ghost Culture"), and Erol Alkan. Avery and Greenwood, with whom she manned the counter at the now-closed Pure Groove, brought her into the studio and introduced her to production software, and Greenwood offered to be her sound engineer. Avery would later invite her to collaborate on his 2013 album Drone Logic. Owens released the Oleic EP a year later, in 2016.

Her eponymous album, Kelly Lee Owens, was released in March 2017 by the Norwegian label Smalltown Supersound. Later in 2017, she released a bonus cut from her album titled "Spaces". The second track on Kelly Lee Owens, "Arthur", is a tribute to the late Arthur Russell; was used by the British luxury fashion house Alexander McQueen for their Fall 2016 runway show prior to the release of the studio album. Avery has a co-writer credit on "Keep Walking", and Jenny Hval appears on "Anxi".

Owens has collaborated with St. Vincent, having remixed her single "New York", from the album Masseduction. She also collaborated with Björk on her EP dedicated to remixes of "Arisen My Senses" from her album Utopia, and Welsh-born John Cale on the track "Corner of my Sky", from her album Inner Song.

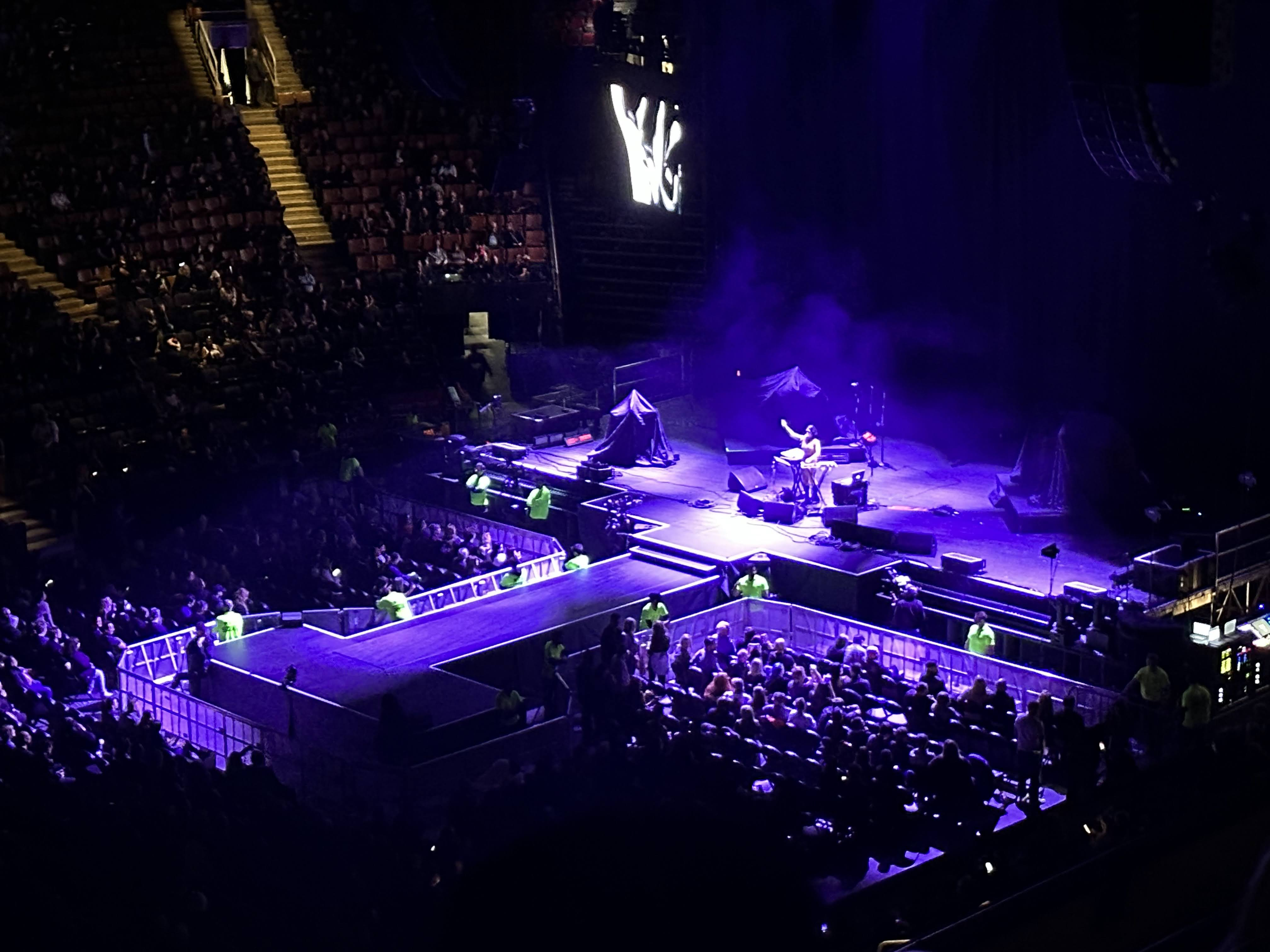
Owens opening for Depeche Mode at Scotiabank Arena, April 2023.

Owens' music has been described as dream pop and techno pop, and has been compared to the work of Arthur Russell. She has expressed interest in the connection between healing and music. In 2017, she told Pitchfork that she was considering an exhibition on the “relationship between sound, healing, and resonant frequencies." She has stated that she enjoys sampling music on her iPhone. On 24 March 2020 Owens announced that her second album, Inner Song, would be released on 28 August.

On 28 October 2021, Owens released "Unity", the theme song for the 2023 FIFA Women's World Cup in Australia and New Zealand, the same day as the unveiling of the event's official emblem and slogan: "Beyond Greatness".

Owens announced in late March 2022 that her third studio album, LP.8, would be released digitally on 29 April and in physical formats on 10 June. She co-produced the album with noise artist Lasse Marhaug.

In 2023, Owens supported Depeche Mode on their North American Memento Mori tour.

In 2024, Owens signed to Dirty Hit's electronic music imprint, dh2. On 11 July 2024, she released her first single under the label, "Love You Got", along with the announcement of her album Dreamstate.

== Personal life ==
Owens currently lives in London. She can read and write Welsh, although she describes herself as "not fluent".

== Discography ==
Kelly Lee Owens discography
- Studio albums: 4
- EPs: 6
- Singles: 17
- Remix albums: 1
- DJ mixes: 2

=== Studio albums ===
List of studio albums, with selected chart positions, showing other relevant details
Title	Details	Peak chart positions			
Title	Details	UK	UK Dance	UK Indie	SCO
Kelly Lee Owens	Released: 24 November 2017; Label: Smalltown Supersound; Formats: LP, CD, LP+CD, digital download, streaming	–	–	–	–
Inner Song	Released: 28 August 2020; Label: Smalltown Supersound; Formats: 2LP, CD, digital download, streaming	80	3	6	44
LP.8	Released: 29 April 2022; Label: Smalltown Supersound; Formats: LP, CD, digital download, streaming	– (Note: LP.8 did not enter the UK Albums Chart but peaked at number 30 on the UK Albums Sales Chart.)	–	7	37
Dreamstate	Released: 18 October 2024; Label: dh2; Formats: LP, CD, digital download, streaming	–	2	5	25

=== Remix albums ===
Title	Details
Inner Song Remix Series	Released: 28 May 2021; Label: Smalltown Supersound; Formats: Digital download, streaming

=== Extended plays ===
List of studio albums, with selected chart positions, showing other relevant details
Title	Details	Peak chart positions
Title	Details	UK Phys.
Oleic	Released: 21 October 2016; Label: Smalltown Supersound; Formats: 12-inch, CD, digital download, streaming	88
On	Released: 24 June 2020; Label: Smalltown Supersound; Formats: 12-inch, digital download, streaming	–
Inner Song Remixes Part 1	Released: 8 October 2021; Label: Smalltown Supersound; Formats: 12-inch, digital download, streaming	21
Inner Song Remixes Part 2	Released: 8 October 2021; Label: Smalltown Supersound; Formats: 12-inch, digital download, streaming	20
LP.8.2	Released: 1 December 2022; Label: Smalltown Supersound; Formats: 12-inch, digital download, streaming	–
Kelly	Released: 21 November 2025; Label: d2h; Formats: digital download, streaming	–

=== DJ mixes ===
Title	Details
"Early Hours"	Released: 30 May 2021; Label: Smalltown Supersound; Formats: Streaming
"Mixmag: Kelly Lee Owens in The Lab, London, 2020"	Released: 16 July 2021; Label: Smalltown Supersound; Formats: Streaming

=== Singles ===
==== As lead artist ====
List of studio albums, with selected chart positions, showing other relevant details
Title	Year	Peak chart positions	Album
Title	Year	UK Phys.	Album
"Lucid" (b/w "Arthur")	2014	–	Kelly Lee Owens
"Uncertain"	2015	–	Kelly Lee Owens
"Cbm"	2016	–	Kelly Lee Owens
"1 of 3"	2016	–	Kelly Lee Owens
"Anxi."	2017	–	Kelly Lee Owens
"Lucid"	2017	–	Kelly Lee Owens
"More Than a Woman"	2017	41	Non-album single
"Bird"	2018	–	Kelly Lee Owens
"Luminous Spaces" (with Jon Hopkins)	2019	5	Non-album singles
"Let It Go" (b/w "Omen")	2019	35	Non-album singles
"Melt!" (b/w "Melt! (Coby Sey Rework)"	2020	12	Inner Song
"Night"	2020	–	Inner Song
"On"	2020	–	Inner Song
"Corner of My Sky (featuring John Cale)	2020	–	Inner Song
"Jeanette"	2020	–	Inner Song
"Unity" (The Official 2023 FIFA Women's World Cup Anthem)	2021	–	Non-album singles
"Spirographs" (with Fyfs and Iskra Strings)	2022	–	Non-album singles
"To Feel Again/Trois" (with Jon Hopkins, Sultan & Shepard, Jerro)	2022	–	Non-album singles
"Love You Got"	2024	–	Dreamstate
"Sunshine"	2024	–	Dreamstate
"Higher"	2024	–	Dreamstate
"Ballad (In The End)"	2024	–	Dreamstate
"Ascend"	2025	–	Kelly
"132 Techno"	2025	–	Kelly

==== As featured artist ====
Title	Year	Album
"Noshi" (Seb Wildblood featuring Kelly Lee Owens)	2015	Non-album single

=== Remixes ===
List of remixes for other artists
Title	Year	Artist	Album
"Kingsize" (Kelly Lee Owens Rework)	2015	Jenny Hval	Non-album remixes
"You Look Certain (I'm Not So Sure)" (Kelly Lee Owens Rework)	2017	Mount Kimbie	Non-album remixes
"New York" (Kelly Lee Owens Remix)	2018	St. Vincent	Non-album remixes
"Arisen My Senses" (Kelly Lee Owens Remix)	2018	Björk	Non-album remixes
"Mirror" (Kelly Lee Owens Remix)	2021	Sigrid	Non-album remixes
"It's All So Incredibly Loud" (Kelly Lee Owens Remix)	2022	Glass Animals	Dreamland (Real Life Edition)
"FENIAN" (Kelly Lee Owens Remix)	2026	KNEECAP	Non-album remix
