= Inner Song =

Studio album by Kelly Lee Owens
- Released: 28 August 2020
- Genres: Techno-pop; dream pop; ambient techno; downtempo; ethereal pop; tech house; progressive house; electronic pop
- Length: 49:56
- Label: Smalltown Supersound
- Producers: Kelly Lee Owens; James Greenwood

Kelly Lee Owens chronology
Kelly Lee Owens (2017)	Inner Song (2020)	LP.8 (2022)

Singles from Inner Song
- 1. "Melt!" Released: 25 February 2020; 2. "Night" Released: 22 April 2020; 3. "On" Released: 24 June 2020; 4. "Corner of My Sky" Released: 8 August 2020; 5. "Jeanette" Released: 4 December 2020

Inner Song is the second studio album by the Welsh electronic musician Kelly Lee Owens. It was released through Smalltown Supersound on 28 August 2020. It features a collaboration with Welsh musician John Cale.

== Background ==
Inner Song was first announced on 25 February 2020 alongside a release of the album's lead single, "Melt!". Owens wrote and recorded the album after what she considered to be the hardest three years of her life. Originally, the album was scheduled to be released on 1 May 2020, but due to the COVID-19 pandemic, the release date was pushed back to 28 August 2020. The album's name is borrowed from a 1974 album by Alan Silva.

The single "Corner of My Sky" features vocals from John Cale in both English and Welsh. Owens explained her collaboration with Cale and the inclusion of the Welsh language was a means to connect with her Welsh heritage. Cale noted that his ability to conjure Welsh phrases was a "surprise since I hadn't written in Welsh for decades".

The album also features a cover of the song "Weird Fishes / Arpeggi" from the 2007 Radiohead album In Rainbows.

Some vinyl editions of the album include a hidden bonus track, titled "My Own", which was released as a Bandcamp exclusive track in March 2021.

== Composition ==
Inner Song is a techno-pop, dream pop, ambient techno, tech house, downtempo, ethereal pop, electronic pop, and progressive house album with elements of trip hop, bedroom pop, industrial techno, R&B, electro, experimental, psychedelic, minimalism and avant-garde.

== Critical reception ==
Professional ratings
Aggregate scores
Source	Rating
AnyDecentMusic?	8.1/10
Metacritic	84/100
Review scores
Source	Rating
AllMusic	3.5/5 stars
Clash	8/10
Exclaim!	8/10
The Independent	4/5 stars
The Line of Best Fit	8.5/10
NME	5/5 stars
Paste	8.6/10
Pitchfork	7.7/10
Q	4/5 stars
Uncut	8/10

The album was released to critical acclaim. At Metacritic, which assigns a normalized rating out of 100 to reviews from mainstream publications, the album received an average score of 84 based on fourteen reviews, indicating "universal acclaim".

Critics praised Owens for her ability to combine multiple genres in a single album. Paul Simpson of AllMusic noted how Owens "flip[s] from downtempo dream pop to spacy techno with ease," and compared her multi-genre approach to her debut album, Kelly Lee Owens. Nathan Smith for Pitchfork writes that Owens is able to utilize multiple styles in the album as a result of "her unusual ability to join the physical with the emotional." Writing for NME, Ben Jolley lauded the album as "perfectly-arranged" and described it as "an emotive-yet-euphoric collection that's made for late-night reflection, Kelly Lee Owens has made one of the most beautiful records of the year."

Critics also praised Owens' vocals. Smith writes, "her vocals are as confident and captivating as her beats." Greg Cochrane of Uncut praised the development and use of Owens' voice: "this time, when deployed, it's positioned centrally."

=== Accolades ===
Accolades for Inner Song
Publication	Accolade	Rank	Ref.
Pitchfork	The 50 Best Albums of 2020	27	
Stereogum	The 50 Best Albums of 2020	21	
Under the Radar	Top 100 Albums of 2020	26	

== Track listing ==
All lyrics and vocal melodies written by Kelly Lee Owens; all music written by Kelly Lee Owens & James Greenwood, unless otherwise noted.

No.	Title	Lyrics	Music	Length
1.	"Arpeggi"		Colin Greenwood; Jonny Greenwood; Ed O'Brien; Philip Selway; Thom Yorke	4:45
2.	"On"			5:57
3.	"Melt!"			3:34
4.	"Re-Wild"			3:42
5.	"Jeanette"			6:14
6.	"L.I.N.E."		James Greenwood	3:47
7.	"Corner of My Sky" (featuring John Cale)	John Cale		7:27
8.	"Night"			5:10
9.	"Flow"			4:54
10.	"Wake-Up"			4:26
Total length:				49:56

Vinyl hidden track

No.	Title	Length
11.	"My Own"	3:11
Total length:		53:07

== Charts ==
Chart performance for Inner Song
Chart (2020)	Peak position
Scottish Albums (Official Charts)	44
UK Albums (Official Charts)	80
