= Valentina Magaletti =

Italian drummer, percussionist, and composer

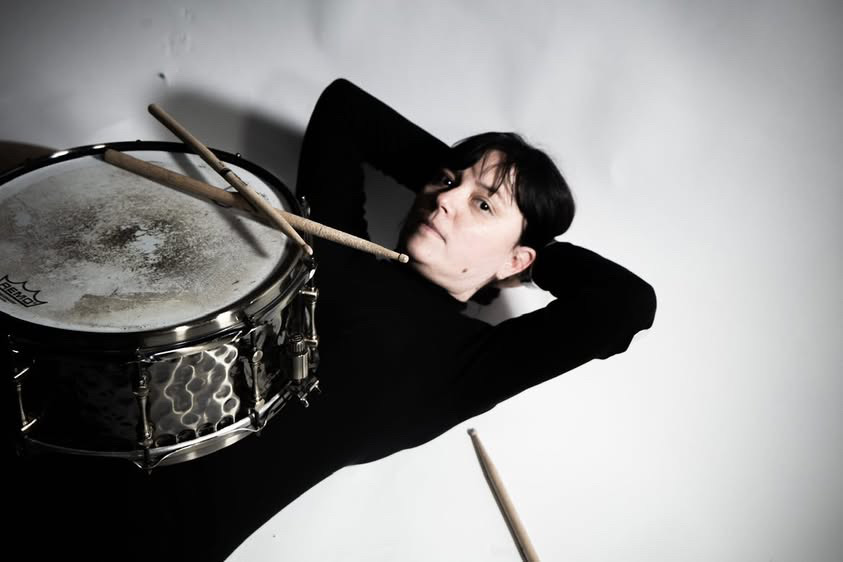

Background information
- Born: Bari, Italy
- Occupations: Drummer; percussionist; composer
- Instruments: Drums; percussion
- Member of: Moin; Holy Tongue; Vanishing Twin; V/Z
- Website: valentinamagaletti.com valentinamagaletti.bandcamp.com

Valentina Magaletti is a British-Italian multi-genre drummer, percussionist, improviser and composer based in London.

== Biography ==
Magaletti was born in Bari, Italy. She lives in London, UK. She started drumming at the age of 12, and her teachers included Agostino Marangolo of prog-rock band Goblin and jazz drummer Michele Di Monte.

== Career ==
Magaletti has collaborated and performed with Thurston Moore, Charles Hayward, Debbie Googe, Nicolas Jaar, Jandek, Mica Levi, Malcolm Mooney, Helm, Malcolm Catto, Lafawndah, Bat for Lashes, Gruff Rhys (Super Furry Animals), and Philip Selway (Radiohead). Her influences include Ikue Mori, Georgia Hubley, Jaki Liebezeit, Milford Graves, Elvin Jones, Tony Buck, Charles Hayward, Billy Higgins, Han Bennink, and Art Blakey. She describes her technique as "akin to an unfolding narrative: stories that eschew spoken language in favour of rhythm, pulse, and vibration." Early influences in her years as a percussion student included progressive rock and the bebop era of jazz.

Her principal project was as one half of the duo Tomaga with bassist/multi-instrumentalist Tom Relleen. She is also a member of Moin with experimental electronic project Raime, the experimental pop quintet Vanishing Twin, the duo V/Z with Zongamin, the dub-influenced Holy Tongue with electronic musician Allen Wootton, the improv project Avvitagalli with Pino Montecalvo, and the supergroup UUUU, along with Graham Lewis (Wire) and Thighpaulsandra (Coil). In 2017, she played drums as part of surviving Can member Irmin Schmidt's the Can Project, based around Schmidt's orchestral reimagining of classic Can songs and themes with an ensemble. She and percussionist and sculptor João Pais Filipe released their first album as CZN (Copper, Zinc and Nickel), The Golden Path in 2018, and a collaborative release with Swiss percussionist and composer Julian Sartorius, Sulla Pelle, followed in 2019.

Of her willingness to collaborate with a wide variety of different musicians, she told The Wire, "You always learn something, or you learn what you don't want to do... it's very clear when it's me writing and producing, and when I play for someone else."

Her 2022 album Batterie Fragile on French label unjenesaisquoi was recorded using sounds from a ceramic drum kit designed by Parisian artist Yves Chaudouët. Of her inspiration for the said project, she told The Wire, "It's an instrument that is totally fragile. I was transfixed by the idea of presenting something that has different connotations to it being a macho instrument. A drum kit made of the most delicate material, conceptually, is fantastic."

A solo album from 2020, A Queer Anthology of Drums, was re-released on vinyl in 2024, with the personal work "reflect[ing] on her queer identity, the ritualistic aspects of improvisation, and the oppressive realities of lockdown life by collaging together low-fi drones, field recordings and modulated percussive objects."

She and French writer Fanny Chiarello formed the imprint Permanent Draft in 2023, which is "dedicated to promoting contemporary female, non-binary and transgender artists." They published Chiarello's book BASTA NOW: Women, Trans & Non-binary in Experimental Music in 2024 along with audio works by Magaletti, Irene Bianco, and Marie De la Nuit.

As of 2025, Magaletti was preparing a new V/Z release, as well as upcoming collaborations with Shackleton (in conjunction with Holy Tongue), Nídia, Osaka-based artist YPY, Dutch electronic artist Upsammy, and Ugandan ensemble Arsenal Mikebe.

== Partial discography ==
Title	Label	Year released
Valentina Plays the Batterie Fragile	Un Je-Ne-Sais-Quoi	2017
Sulla Pelle	Marionette	2019
Due Matte	Commando Vanessa	2020
A Queer Anthology of Drums	Takuroku	2020
La Tempesta Colorata	A Colourful Storm	2022
Batterie Fragile	Un Je-Ne-Sais-Quoi	2022
Rotta	Blume	2022
Cupo	Self-released	2023
EP/64-63	Permanent Draft	2023
Ondata Rossa	Content Providers.Ltd	2023
Different Rooms	Longform Editions	2023
Lucha Libre	Permanent Draft	2024
