= True Romance (Golden Silvers album) =

Studio album by Golden Silvers
- Released: April 20, 2009
- Genres: Art pop, Pop, Doo-wop
- Label: XL Recordings

Singles from True Romance
- 1. "True Romance (True No.9 Blues)" Released: April 29, 2009; 2. "Arrows of Eros" Released: June 23, 2009; 3. "Please Venus" Released: August 24, 2009

True Romance is the only album by Golden Silvers. It was released by XL Recordings on April 20, 2009, on CD, download and 12″ vinyl.

== Critical reception ==
Professional ratings
Review scores
Source	Rating
The Guardian	link
musicOMH	link
NME	link
PopMatters	link
Q Music	3/5 stars

The album received generally positive reviews. It earned a collective score of 71 out of 100 from Metacritic. Dave Simpson of The Guardian said that the album contains a "combination of masterful songwriting and lyrics that introduce dark edges" to a "more timeless than retro" sound.

== Singles ==
- "True Romance (True No.9 Blues)" was released as the album's lead single and peaked at #142 on the UK Singles Chart.

== Track listing ==
No.	Title	Length
1.	"Another Universe"	4:51
2.	"True Romance (True No. 9 Blues)"	3:32
3.	"Magic Touch"	4:05
4.	"My Love Is a Seed That Doesn't Grow"	4:04
5.	"Here Comes The King"	4:05
6.	"Shakes"	3:51
7.	"Queen Of The 21st Century"	5:01
8.	"Please Venus"	5:00
9.	"Arrows Of Eros"	5:38
10.	"Fade To Black"	2:49

== Personnel ==
- Neil Brockbank - engineer
- Nathaniel Facey - alto saxophone
- Gwilym Gold - composer, keyboards, vocals, artwork
- Dougal Lott - engineer
- B.J. Ben Mason - engineer
- Ben Moorhouse - bass, background vocals
- Michael Mwenso - trombone
- Robbie Nelson - engineer
- Jay Phelps - trumpet
- Daniel Rejmer - engineer
- Graham Turner - photography
- Rebecca Miller - photography
- Colin Henderson - album cover design/illustration
- Jack Watkins - web design

== Chart ==
True Romance debuted and peaked at #96 on the UK Singles Chart and spent a total of 5 weeks on the chart.

Chart (2009)	Peak position
UK Albums Chart	96
