= Kwes =

British music producer, composer, and artist

- Born: Kwesi Sey
- Origin: Lewisham, London, England
- Occupations: Producer; composer; artist; songwriter; mixer
- Years active: 2006–present
- Label: Warp
- Website: kwes.info

Kwesi Sey, professionally known as Kwes ( /kwɛs/; sometimes stylised as kwes, kwes., Kwes. or [o=o]. ) is a British music producer, composer and artist from London, England. Kwes is also currently signed to Warp as a solo artist and released his debut album, ilp, in October 2013. He has since gone on to produce music for the likes of Damon Albarn, Bobby Womack, Solange Knowles, Sampha, Loyle Carner, Black Coffee, Nubya Garcia, Mica Levi, Tirzah, Lucy Rose and numerous others. He also composed his debut feature length score for 2023 British rom-com film Rye Lane, directed by Raine Allen-Miller. It won a BIFA in 2023 for Best Original Music.

== Biography ==
Kwes began playing his grandparents' organ at the age of four and his grandmother bought him his first small keyboard aged 5. For his tenth birthday, he received a radio/tape recorder with a built-in microphone, which launched his interest in sound recording. Kwes's younger brother is the musician Coby Sey.

In an interview in 2012, Kwes said he has synesthesia. His earliest synaesthetic experiences occurred around the age of 4 and he attempted to colour paper with the particular colours he was seeing when listening to music. These colours have been set since he first discovered his condition: "any form of a G-chord would have orange in it, and the other notes which are not G accompanying that G-chord would have an effect on the type of orange it is. Majors tend to be slightly brighter. Same applies for D which is always – yellow/green, E which is Yellow/gold, F which is violet/blue, C – Blue, A – light blue, B – yellow/gold/green." His synaesthetic impressions of his own music are translated in the artwork to his solo releases, including "Hearts in Home" and "No Need to Run".

== Discography ==
Year	Artist	Title	Release	Label	Credit
2024	Nubya Garcia	All tracks	Odyssey (LP)	Concord	Co-production, mixing
2024	Lucy Rose	All tracks	This Ain't The Way You Go Out (LP)	Communion Music	Co-production
2024	Nubya Garcia	"Fortify"	"Fortify" (Single)	Concord	Co-production, mixing
2023	Kwes	Original Score	Rye Lane	Searchlight Pictures	Composition
2023	Valentina	All tracks	All Are Lost (EP)	Tocca Te	Additional production, mixing
2023	Nadiah	"Draw The Line"	"Draw The Line" (Single)	NNN Recordings	Co-production, co-write, mixing
2023	Sampha	"Can't Go Back"	Lahai (LP)	Young	Additional production
2023	Ragz Originale	"Flashbacks" Ft. Sampha, July ft. Tiana Major9 & Venna	Bare Sugar (LP)	Mini Kingz	Co-Production, mixing
2023	Brother May	All tracks	Pattern With Force (EP)	Self released	Mixing
2022	Loyle Carner	All tracks except "Georgetown"	hugo (LP)	EMI	Executive production, co-production, co-write
2022	Hudson Mohawke	"Ingle Nook"	Cry Sugar (LP)	Warp	co-write
2022	Lil Silva	"Be Cool" (ft. Little Dragon), Backwards (ft. Sampha), Colours, Still (ft. Sampha & Ghetts)	Yesterday Is Heavy (LP)	Nowhere / Platoon	Co-production, co-write
2022	Loyle Carner	"Hate"	Hate (single)	EMI	Co-production, co-write
2022	Auclair	All Tracks	Giramata (EP)	Amorphous Sounds	Mixing
2022	Selah Sue	"Twice A Day", "Full of Life"	Persona (LP)	Because	Co-production, mixing
2021	Elan Tamara	All Tracks	We Can Fall (LP)	BOKKLE	Production, mixing
2021	Tirzah	"Ribs"	Ribs (single)	Domino	Mixing
2021	Zola	All music	Zola	A24	Mixing
2021	Tirzah	All Tracks	Colourgrade (LP)	Domino	A&R (all tracks), mixing on "Sink In", "Recipe"
2021	Brodka	All Tracks	BRUT (LP)	Kayax/[PIAS]	Co-mixing
2021	Black Coffee	"Never Gonna Forget" with Diplo ft. Elderbrook	Never Gonna Forget (single)	Ultra Records	Co-production, co-write
2021	Virgil Abloh	"Delicate Limbs" ft. serpentwithfeet	Delicate Limbs (single)	Columbia	Co-production, co-write
2020	Landshapes	All tracks	Contact (LP)	Bella Union	Production, mixing
2020	Loyle Carner	"Yesterday"	Yesterday (single)	EMI	Vocal engineer
2020	Duval Timothy	"Fall Again"	Help (LP)	Carrying Colour	OP-1
2020	Nubya Garcia	All tracks	Source (LP)	Concord	Co-production, mixing
2020	otta	All tracks	Songbook (EP)	BOKKLE/[PIAS]	Add prod, mixing, a&r
2020	Elan Tamara	"My Eyes"	My Eyes (single)	BOKKLE/[PIAS]	prod, mixing, a&r
2020	Denai Moore	"Hail"	Modern Dread (LP)	Because	Co-production, co-write
2020	Daniel Merriweather	"Paradise"	Paradise (single)	Self released	Add prod, mixing
2020	Nubya Garcia	"Pace"	Pace (single)	Concord	Co-production, mixing
2020	Selah Sue	All tracks	Bedroom EP (EP)	Because	Co-production, mixing
2020	otta	All tracks	after it all blew over (EP)	BOKKLE/[PIAS]	Add prod, mixing, a&r
2019	LA Timpa	All tracks	Equal Amounts Afraid (LP)	O___O	Mixing
2019	Daniel Merriweather	"Everything I Need"	Everything I Need (single)	Self released	Mixing
2019	Camelia	All tracks	Everytime / Sometimes (single)	Self released	Mixing
2019	Little Miss Sumo	All tracks	Little Miss Sumo (OST)	Walks of Life Films, Netflix	Composition, mixing
2019	Nérija	All tracks	Blume (LP)	Domino	Production, mixing, a&r, artwork
2019	Loyle Carner	"Still", "Desoleil", "Krispy", "Carluccio", "Ice Water"	Not Waving, But Drowning (LP)	AMF, Virgin EMI	Production, co-write on "Still", "Desoleil", "Krispy", "Carluccio". Additional production on "Ice Water"
2019	Arlo Day	All tracks	Bad Timing (EP)	Domino	Mixing, a&r
2019	Nérija	All tracks	NÉRIJA EP (EP)	Domino	Mixing, a&r
2018	Ragz Originale	All tracks	Nature (LP)	Mini Kingz	Executive Production
2018	Hilang Child	All tracks	Years (LP)	Bella Union	Mixing
2018	Tirzah	All tracks	Devotion (LP)	Domino	A&R, co-mixing
2018	Kwes.	All tracks	songs for Midi (EP)	Warp	Production, write, mixing, primary artist
2017	Kelela	All tracks	Take Me Apart (LP)	Warp	Mixing
2017	Kelela	"Waitin", "Take Me Apart", "Enough", "Better", "LMK", "Truth or Dare", "Turn To Dust", "Altadena"	Take Me Apart (LP)	Warp	Additional production w/ various
2017	All We Are	All tracks	Sunny Hills (LP)	Domino	Co-production, mixing, a&r
2017	ELIZA	"Wide Eyed Fool"	"Wide Eyed Fool" (single)	ELIZA	Mixing
2017	Loyle Carner	"Florence", "Mrs C" and "Sun of Jean"	Yesterday's Gone (LP)	AMF, Virgin EMI	Production, co-write (on all tracks); Production, co-write and mixing (on "Florence")
2017	Coby Sey	"Petals Have Fallen"	Petals Have Fallen (single)	self-release	Add. production; mixing
2017	BILA	"Didn't Lose"	Didn't Lose (single)	self-release	Production, co-write
2017	Coby Sey	All tracks	Whities 010: Transport for Lewisham (EP)	AD 93 (Whities)	Co-mixing w/ Coby Sey
2017	Elan Tamara	"Long Walks"	"Long Walks" (single)	self-release	Production
2016	Solange	"Don't You Wait", "Where Do We Go", "Don't Wish Me Well", "Scales"	A Seat at the Table (LP)	Saint, Columbia	Co-production, co-write w/ various
2016	PAULi	All tracks	The Idea of Tomorrow (EP)	PAULi	Co-production
2016	Kano	"My Sound"	Made in the Manor (LP)	BPM, Parlophone	Additional production, co-write w/ Blue May and Jodi Milliner
2016	Hudson Mohawke	"Indian Steps"	Lantern (LP)	Warp	Additional production w/ Hudson Mohawke
2016	Samuel	All tracks	Luv Cry (EP)	Big Dada	Production, co-production
2016	Nao	"It's You"	15 February (EP)	Little Tokyo, Sony	Production, co-write
2016	Rosie Lowe	"Right Thing"	Control (LP)	Wolf Tone, Polydor	Production, co-write w/ Dave Okumu and Rosie Lowe
2016	Samuel	"These Days"	These Days (single)	Big Dada	Production
2015	George Maple	"Gripp" ft. Kilo Kish	Vacant Space	Future Classic Pty, Virgin EMI	Production, co-write
2014	DELS	All tracks	Petals Have Fallen (LP)	Big Dada	Production, co-write w/ various
2014	Kwes.	All tracks	ilpix (EP)	Warp	Production, write, primary artist
2014	Moko	"Missing Love"	Gold (EP)	MTA, Virgin EMI	Production, co-write
2014	Shivum Sharma	All tracks	Flicker/Only You (single)	National Anthem	Production
2014	Rosie Lowe	All tracks	Right Thing (EP)	37 Adventures	Production, co-write w/ Dave Okumu and Rosie Lowe
2014	Pusha T	"Who I Am" ft. 2 Chainz and Big Sean	My Name Is My Name (LP)	GOOD, Def Jam	Sampled
2014	Eliza Doolittle	"Don't Call It Love"	In Your Hands (LP)	Parlophone	Production, co-write
2013	Kwes.	All tracks	ilp (LP)	Warp	Production, write, primary artist
2013	Valentina	All tracks	Wolves (EP)	Greco Roman	Production w/ various
2012	Bobby Womack	"Whatever Happened to the Times"	The Bravest Man in the Universe (LP)	XL	Production w/ Damon Albarn and Richard Russell
2012	Kwesachu (Kwes & Micachu)	All tracks	Kwesachu Mixtape Vol.2 (mixtape)	self-release	Production w/ Micachu
2012	Kwes.	All tracks	Meantime	Warp	Production, write, mixing, primary artist
2012	Speech Debelle	All tracks	Freedom of Speech	Big Dada	Production, co-write
2012	Sunless '97	All tracks	Making Waves (EP)	Abeano/XL	Production
2012	Valentina	All tracks	Weights (EP)	Little Chaos	Production w/ Blue May
2011	Elan Tamara	All tracks	Organ (EP)	Big Dada	Production
2011	DRC Music	"Customs", "Three Piece Sweet Part 1 & 2", "If You Wish to Stay Awake", "Departure", "Three Piece Sweet Part 3 (bonus track)"	Kinshasa One Two (LP)	Warp	Production, co-write w/ various
2011	DELS	"Hydronenberg", "Moonshing", "Eating Clouds", "Violina/Bread Before Bed", "DLR", "Droogs", "GOB"	GOB (LP)	Big Dada	Production, co-write
2010	Dog Bite	All tracks	Machino Machino/Take Your Time (single)	Young Turks	Production
2010	Elan Tamara	All tracks	Shadows (EP)	self-release	Production
2010	Kwes.	All tracks	No Need To Run (EP)	Young Turks	Production, mixing, write, primary artist
2009	Elan Tamara	All tracks	Gold Fishes (EP)	self-release	Production
2009	Kwesachu (Kwes. & Micachu)	All tracks	Kwesachu Mixtape Vol.1 (mixtape)	self-release	Production w/ Micachu
2009	Kwes.	All tracks	Hearts in Home/Tissues (single)	Salvia/XL	Production, write, primary artist
2009	Micachu	"Outro"	Filthy Friends: Volume 1 (mixtape)	self-release	Production
2007	Jack Peñate	"A Good Weapon"	Second, Minute or Hour (single)	XL	Keyboards
2007	Jack Peñate	"Run For Your Life"	Matinée (LP)	XL	Keyboards

== Artist discography ==
=== Albums ===
Year	Album details
2013	ilp.: Released: 14 / 15 October 2013; Label: Warp; Formats: LP, CD, Digital download
2026	Kinds: Released: 27 February 2026; Label: Warp; Formats: LP, CD, Digital download

=== EPs ===
Year	EP details
2010	No Need To Run: Released: 28 June 2010; Label: Young; Formats: 12" EP, Digital download
2012	Meantime: Released: 30 April / 1 May 2012; Label: Warp; Formats: 12" EP, CD, Digital download
2018	Songs for Midi: Released: 5 April 2018; Label: Warp; Formats: 12" EP, Digital download

=== Remix EP ===
Year	Remix EP details
2014	ilpix: Released: 15 September 2014; Label: Warp; Formats: Digital download

=== Singles ===
- "Hearts in Home" (16 February 2009)
- "Get Up" (13 November 2011)
- "Bashful" (7 March 2012)
- "Rollerblades" (26 November 2012)

=== Mixtapes ===
Year	Mixtape details
2010	Kwesachu Mixtape Vol.1 with Micachu: Released: 5 June 2009; Label: Self-released; Formats: Cassette tape, Digital download
2012	Kwesachu Mixtape Vol.2 with Micachu: Released: 30 April 2012; Label: Self-released; Formats: Cassette tape, Digital download

== Live session duties ==
- Ebony Bones – Guitarist (2006–2007, 2008)
- Bono Must Die now O. Children – Keyboardist (2007)
- Jack Peñate – Laptop and keyboards (2009)
- Kwesachu (with Micachu) – co-production and co-selector (2009–?)
- Elan Tamara – Bassist (2009–2011)
- Leftfield – Keyboards and Computers (2010)
- Bobby Womack – Keyboards (2012–2013)
