= Golden Silvers =

English band

- Origin: London, England
- Genres: Art pop, Pop, Doo-wop
- Years active: 2008–2010
- Labels: XL Recordings; Bronze Records
- Members: Gwilym Gold; Ben Moorhouse; Robden Alexis Nunez

Golden Silvers were an English band from London signed to independent record label XL Recordings. The line-up consisted of vocalist and keyboardist Gwilym Gold, Ben Moorhouse on bass guitar, and Robden Alexis Nunez on drums.

== Early stages ==
The band gained recognition by winning Glastonbury's prestigious New Talent competition in 2008 and subsequently performed on The Other stage that year. They played the Glastonbury Festival in 2009.

== Music ==
The band released its debut album True Romance on 20 April 2009. Describing the new album, The Guardian's reviewer wrote "flamboyant lyrics, references to Greek myth and big, elastic bass lines dominate".

== Appearances ==
The band performed two songs on Later...with Jools Holland during May 2009 and have supported Blur at Hyde Park, London. They played a popular set at Reading festival 2009 and gave away necklaces to the audience as thanks for coming to see them.

Aside from live appearances, Golden Silvers' vocalist Gwilym Gold curates a quarterly live event night named 'Bronze Club' at East London pub 'The Macbeth'. Bronze Blog is known to showcase a wide variety of musicians and DJs including Mystery Jets, The Invisible, Micachu, Esser, Everything Everything, Othello Wolf and many more. Since its inception, Bronze Club has said to have gathered a strong following, which has led attendants to dress up in relation to the Ages of Man in Greek Mythology; gold, silver and bronze.

== Discography ==
=== Studio albums ===
Year	Album details	Peak positions
Year	Album details	UK
2009	True Romance: Release date: 20 April 2009; Label: XL Recordings	96

=== Singles ===
Year	Single	Peak positions	Album
Year	Single	UK	Album
2009	"True Romance (True No. 9 Blues)"	142	True Romance
2009	"Arrows of Eros"	—	True Romance
2009	"Please Venus"	—	True Romance
"—" denotes releases that did not chart
