= Dels =

English artist, musician, and filmmaker

DELS
- Also known as: Kieren Gallear
- Born: Kieren Dickins
- Origin: Ipswich / London, England
- Genres: Hip hop
- Occupations: Recording artist; musician; rapper; graphics designer; filmmaker; art director
- Instrument: Vocals
- Years active: 2005–2015 (music); 2016–present (art director)
- Labels: Big Dada; Ninja Tune
- Website: DELS on Big Dada

Kieren Gallear also known as DELS, is an English art director, recording artist, rapper, graphics designer, and filmmaker who signed with the Ninja Tune imprint Big Dada in May 2010.

== GOB (2011) ==
DELS has released three singles, "Shapeshift", "Trumpalump" (produced by Hot Chip's Joe Goddard) and "GOB" (produced by Kwes), in 2010 and 2011. His debut album GOB (2011) was produced by Kwes, with Micachu engineering two tracks and Joe Goddard three tracks. DELS met all three producers via Myspace when the social networking site was at its peak of popularity.

== Critical acclaim ==
DELS was described as the "Future of UK Hip Hop" by British national newspaper The Times in their "Ones to Watch 2011" list in January 2011. Paul Lester of The Guardian has complimented Dickins for his ability to set himself apart from many homogeneous hip-hop artists by sounding both languid and urgent. Lester has described Dickins as "Dizzee mixed with the Björk of Vespertina". DELS has received positive media coverage from BBC Radio 1 and 6 Music DJs such as Zane Lowe, Annie Mac, Huw Stephens, Reggie Yates, Huey Morgan and Lauren Laverne. DELS' single "Shapeshift" was listed by Dazed & Confused and Drowned in Sound as one of their top singles of 2010.

== Petals Have Fallen (2014) ==
Gallear's second album, Petals Have Fallen, was released on 3 November 2014. He said:

I met most of the people that contributed to this album on MySpace back in 2005. We had a page called "Loners", where myself and the likes of Kwes, Micachu, Ghostpoet, Sampha, Coby Sey, Elan Tamara and others were all featured. We always said that we'd do a proper album together eventually. Petals Have Fallen is probably the closest thing to that happening to date.

== Personal life ==
DELS is a fan of football club Arsenal and Japanese anime.

== Discography ==
=== Studio albums ===
- GOB (2 May 2011)
- Petals Have Fallen (3 November 2014)

=== EPs ===
- Black Salad (2012)

=== Singles ===
| Year | Single | Album | Label |
|---|---|---|---|
| 25 February 2008 | "Lazy" | Non-album single | Moshi Moshi |
| 23 August 2010 | "Shapeshift" | GOB | Big Dada |
| 29 November 2010 | "Trumpalump" (featuring Joe Goddard) | GOB | Big Dada |
| 25 April 2011 | "GOB" | GOB | Big Dada |
| 18 August 2011 | "Capsize" (featuring Joe Goddard & Roots Manuva) | GOB | Big Dada |
| 26 November 2012 | "Bird Milk" (featuring BILA) | Black Salad EP | Big Dada |
| 26 November 2012 | "You Live in My Head" | Black Salad EP | Big Dada |
| 8 August 2014 | "RGB / Fall Apart" | Petals Have Fallen | Big Dada |
| 23 October 2014 | "Burning Beaches" (featuring Rosie Lowe) | Petals Have Fallen | Big Dada |

=== Guest appearances ===
- Kwesachu Mixtape Vol.1 (2010)
- Eyesdown (Remix) (w/ Bonobo & Andreya Triana) (2011)
- Kwesachu Mixtape Vol.2 (2012)

== Filmography ==
=== Music videos ===
- "You Live in My Head" (DELS) 2012
- "Right Thing" (Rosie Lowe) 2013
