= Injury Reserve discography =

- Studio albums: 2
- EPs: 2
- Mixtapes: 3
- Singles: 17

The discography of the hip-hop group Injury Reserve consists of two studio albums, three mixtapes, two extended plays and 17 singles as well as several contributions.

== Albums ==
Title	Album details
Injury Reserve	Release: May 17, 2019; Label: Seneca Village, Loma Vista; Format: Digital download, vinyl, CD, cassette, streaming
By the Time I Get to Phoenix	Release: September 15, 2021; Label: Self-released; Format: Digital download, vinyl, CD, cassette, streaming

== Mixtapes ==
Title	Album details
Depth Chart	Release: March 27, 2013; Label: Self-released; Format: Digital download
Live from the Dentist Office	Release: July 22, 2015; Label: Self-released; Format: Digital download, vinyl, streaming
Floss	Release: 15 December 2016; Label: Self-released; Format: Digital download, vinyl, streaming

== Extended plays ==
Title	Album details
Cooler Colors	Release: June 18, 2014; Label: Self-released; Format: Digital download
Drive It Like It's Stolen	Release: September 29, 2017; Label: Self-released; Format: Digital download, vinyl, streaming

== Box sets ==
Title	Album details
Complete Discography Box Set	Release: August 18, 2023; Label: Self-released; Format: Vinyl

== Guest appearances ==
List of guest appearances, with other performing artists, showing year released and album name
Title	Year	Main artist	Album
"Mutual Destruction"	2017	TEEKS	Non-album singles
"Campfire"	2018	Aminé	Non-album singles
"Talkin' Greezy (Remix)"	2018	Cakes da Killa	Non-album singles
"745 sticky (Injury Reserve Remix)"	2019	100 gecs	1000 Gecs and The Tree of Clues
"Fetus"	2020	Aminé	Limbo
"Robert"	2020	Jockstrap	Wicked City
"Aquarius"	2020	Dos Monos	Dos Siki
"TED TALK"	2020	Tony Velour	3M
"Ghost (Injury Reserve Remix)"	2022	Body Meat	Non-album single
"Counting Sheep (V2) [2018 Export Wav]"	2023	Flume	Things Don't Always Go The Way You Plan

== Singles ==
Title	Year	Album
"Whatever Dude"	2015	Live from the Dentist Office
"Washed Up"	2015	Live from the Dentist Office
"Everybody Knows"	2015	Live from the Dentist Office
"Oh Shit!!"	2016	Floss
"All This Money"	2016	Floss
"Keep On Slippin'" (featuring Vic Mensa)	2016	Floss
"North Pole" (featuring Austin Anderson)	2017	Drive It Like It's Stolen
"See You Sweat"	2017	Drive It Like It's Stolen
"Jawbreaker" (featuring Rico Nasty and Pro Teens)	2019	Injury Reserve
"Jailbreak the Tesla" (featuring Aminé)	2019	Injury Reserve
"Koruna & Lime" (featuring A-Trak)	2019	Injury Reserve
"HPNGC" (featuring JPEGMafia and Code Orange)	2020	Non-album singles
"Hoodwinked"	2020	Non-album singles
"Waste Management"	2020	Non-album singles
"Rock n Roll"	2020	Non-album singles
"Knees"	2021	By the Time I Get to Phoenix
"Superman That"	2021	By the Time I Get to Phoenix
