= Pop Sound =

2026 single by Kim Petras

- Re-release cover

Single by Kim Petras

from the album Detour (Rare n' Deluxe)
- Released: 10 February 2026 (original); 15 July 2026 (re-released)
- Length: 2:51
- Label: BunHead; Amigo (Note: "Pop Sound" was originally self-released by Kim Petras before being reissued by Amigo in July 2026.)
- Songwriters: Kim Petras; Angel Prost; Lulu Prost; Nick Weiss
- Producers: Kim Petras; Frost Children; Nightfeelings

Kim Petras singles chronology
"Jeep" (2026)	"Pop Sound" (2026)

Music video
- "Pop Sound" on YouTube

"Pop Sound" is a song by German singer Kim Petras. She co-wrote the song with Angel Prost, Lulu Prost, and Nick Weiss, and produced it with Frost Children and Nightfeelings. "Pop Sound" was released on 10 February 2026 as a surprise release single, eventually being re-released on streaming platforms on 15 July. It was also included on the deluxe edition of her third studio album, Detour, subtitled Rare n' Deluxe.

== Release ==
While delays impacted the rollout for her third studio album, Detour (2026), Petras independently released an unofficial extended play (EP) with four tracks, including "Pop Sound", that were only available on YouTube and SoundCloud.

== Reception ==
Atwood Magazine said "Pop Sound is the most successful track of the bunch and on par with the best singles from Detour, featuring weapons grade hooks, dystopic musings on the nature of pop stardom, and a drop a la Frost Children's most successful tracks on Sister (2025)".

There were consistent fan requests for this song to be put on streaming services, leading Petras to tell fans to stop asking for the song and allow it to remain "our little secret that we love dearly". She eventually released the song on streaming services, also as a surprise release.
