= Babymorocco =

English record producer, singer, and performance artist

- Born: Clayton Pettet; 30 August 1994 (age 32); Casablanca, Morocco
- Education: Central Saint Martins
- Occupations: Singer; record producer; performance artist
- Years active: 2013–present
- Musical career
- Origin: London, England
- Genres: Experimental pop; dance; electro
- Labels: True Panther; Phat Boy

Clayton Pettet, known professionally as Babymorocco, is a Moroccan-born English singer, record producer, and performance artist. In 2013, he announced his debut performance art piece, Art School Stole My Virginity, which he stated would involve him losing his virginity in front of a crowd. It took place in 2014. He began making music professionally during the COVID-19 pandemic, signing to True Panther Records and releasing his debut extended play, The Sound, in 2023.

== Early life and career ==
Clayton Pettet was born in Casablanca, Morocco to an English father, who works as a lawyer for a teachers' union, and a Moroccan Jewish mother, who runs a charity shop. His parents met on a kibbutz in Israel, where most of his family resides, and secretly married in Chelsea. He has a twin brother, Tamir, and two older sisters. He grew up in Boscombe, a suburb of Bournemouth, England; he was raised Jewish and had a bar mitzvah. He attended a boys' sports school, which he has stated was the worst-rated in his county, where he faced antisemitism from his classmates. As a teenager, he often went to clubs, including an under-18 trance night that, according to him, "changed [his] life" and heavily influenced his later music.

He moved to London at age 18 and attended Central Saint Martins to study fine art. In 2013, Pettet announced that his debut performance art project, Art School Stole My Virginity, would involve him publicly losing his virginity to a male classmate in front of around 100 guests. The announcement made international news and caused Central Saint Martins to publicly distance themselves from Pettet. He was arrested by police for graffitiing the name of the show and its date on a billboard in East London in November 2013. The show took place at Marylebone Gardens in April 2014 and did not involve him being sexually penetrated, with him instead inviting guests into a separate room to put a banana in his mouth and revealing he had never intended to lose his virginity during the show. Pettet, using the name Babymorocco, became popular on Instagram and Tumblr in 2016 for his sexualized self-portraits.

Babymorocco began making music professionally during the COVID-19 pandemic. His debut single, "iPhone Song 5", was released in October 2020. He signed to True Panther Records and released his debut extended play, The Sound, in June 2023, preceded by the single "Sun Sex Party". He also started an independent record label, Phat Boy Records. Babymorocco was featured on the Jockstrap song "Sexy" from their remix album I<3UQTINVU, released in November 2023. He performed as an opening act for hyperpop singer Dorian Electra on the European dates for the world tour in promotion of their album Fanfare in January 2024. He released his The Summer Fables mixtape on 14 August 2026.

Pettet played Freddy in the Channel 4 comedy series It Gets Worse.

== Artistry ==
Babymorocco has listed Carolee Schneemann, John Currin, Marina Abramovic, Jeff Koons, and Annabel Chong as influences on his art. Babymorocco's music is house music inspired by club music of the early 2000s and Eurotrash. Douglas Greenwood of i-D wrote that Babymorocco combined "the intense aesthetics of male heterosexuals" with "songs that sound like they might sample the Pet Shop Boys", calling him "the coolest man in British music at the moment" in 2023.

== Personal life ==
In October 2024, Babymorocco came out during an interview with Gay Times, stating that he had a boyfriend for four years and had sexual experiences with women and men.

== Discography ==
=== Studio albums ===
List of studio albums, with release date and label shown
Title	Details
Amour	Released: 6 December 2024; Label: True Panther; Format: Digital download, streaming

=== Extended plays ===
List of extended plays, with release date and label shown
Title	Details
The Sound	Released: 9 June 2023; Label: True Panther; Format: Digital download, streaming

=== Singles ===
List of singles as lead artist with title, year, and album
Title	Year	Album
"iPhone Song 5"	2020	Non-album singles
"My Sad Blue Tears in Los Angeles"	2021	Non-album singles
"Tuch Me"	2021	Non-album singles
"I Wish (California)"	2022	Non-album singles
"I Dont Like the Truth with U"	2022	Non-album singles
"Girlfriends"	2022	The Sound
"Destruction"	2022	The Sound
"Lets Go Zante” (featuring River Moon)	2022	Non-album singles
"Fading (From My Eyes)"	2022	Non-album singles
"I Wish You Would Make It Easy"	2023	Non-album singles
"NRG"	2023	The Sound
"Sun Sex Party"	2023	The Sound
"Everyone"	2023	The Sound
"SXC" (with Frost Children)	2023	Non-album singles
"I'll Fall (Again)"	2023	Non-album singles
"Automatic"	2024	Non-album singles
"Crazy Cheap" (with TRISTÁN)	2024	Amour
"Really Hot"	2024	Amour
"Portarnos Mal" (with SoFFT)	2024	Non-album single
"Babestation"	2024	Amour
"Bikinis and Trackies" (featuring Frost Children)	2024	Amour
"Body Organic Disco Electronic"	2024	Amour
"Shmarmaladeharmonica"	2026	The Summer Fables

=== Guest appearances ===
List of guest appearances, with year released, other artist(s), and album name shown
Title	Year	Other artist(s)	Album
"Sexy"	2023	Jockstrap	I<3UQTINVU
"I'll Fall (Again)"	2023	Bo En, Bamster	Pale Machine 2
"Portarnos Mal"	2024	SoFTT	Non-album single
"Luv drunk"	2024	iKeda	Pretty Little Problem
"N.E.X"	2024	iKeda	Pretty Little Problem
"Ralph Lauren"	2025	Frost Children	Sister

== Television ==
List of television appearances
Year	Title	Role	Network	Notes
2026	It Gets Worse	Freddie	Channel 4	4 episodes; also contributed music
