= I.Am.Gia =

Australian clothing brand

I.AM.GIA
- Type: Private
- Industry: Fashion
- Founded: 2017
- Founder: Alana Pallister, Stevie Cox
- Headquarters: Los Angeles, CA
- Area served: Worldwide
- Products: Apparel
- Number of employees: 51-200

I.AM.GIA is an Australian fashion clothing company founded in 2017. The company's clothing has been seen on numerous celebrities and has gained popularity through the social media app Instagram.

== History ==
I.AM.GIA was co-founded by Alana Pallister with her sister Stevie Cox in May 2017. The name Gia was inspired by supermodel Gia Carangi. The character Gia was created to be strong and independent and to inspire and empower other women.

I.AM.GIA initially received attention in the fashion industry when American model Bella Hadid was photographed wearing the brand's clothing during a Paris Fashion Week. Hadid's stylist contacted the company just four weeks after its launch, attracting others to the new company. In addition, the company's use of the Instagram app for promotion also led to an increase in sales.

== In the media ==
The company's clothing has been worn by models such as Bella Hadid, Emily Ratajkowski, Kaia Gerber, Romee Strijd, Jourdan Dunn, and Chloe Cherry; singers and rappers such as Selena Gomez, Ariana Grande, Ice Spice, Sexyy Red, Sabrina Carpenter, Tyla, and Doja Cat; and reality television personality Kylie Jenner. The company's clothing is shown repeatedly on the HBO television series, Euphoria.

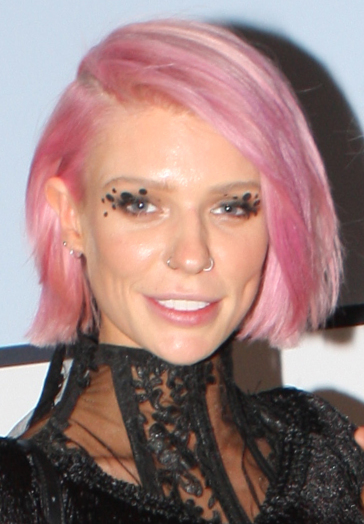
Alana Pallister 2015

== Collections ==
The Gia "Icons" collection was released in Summer of 2022 and was inspired by the "model-off-duty" look. This collection includes many all black and leather garments.

The "Miss Gia Racing" collection launched in 2024 and was inspired by Pallister's experiences in the 2000s working as a grid girl at racing events such as F1 and the Indy 500. The campaign for this collection featured a pageant show where 10 girls competed for the title of "Miss Gia Racing 2024". The winner, Emily Ratajkowski, was announced at the 2024 Monaco Grand Prix.
