= Hearth Room =

Studio album by Frost Children
- Released: November 17, 2023
- Genre: Indie pop
- Length: 37:06
- Label: True Panther Sounds
- Producer: Frost Children

Frost Children chronology
Speed Run (2023)	Hearth Room (2023)	Sister (2025)

Hearth Room is the fifth studio album by American pop group Frost Children, released on November 17, 2023.

== Reception ==
At Clash, Harry Thorfinn-George rated this album a 6 out of 10, ending that this album "captures that the times are a-changing – luckily, it sounds pretty good". Writing for Pitchfork, Harry Tafoya scored Hearth Room a 7.4 out of 10, calling this a reinvention for the band, as "the songs follow more conventional pop structures and don't get derailed by verbal or musical non sequiturs". In The Saturday Paper, Shaad D'Souza called Hearth Room and its predecessor Speed Run sister albums that "can make for a fun, bracing listen" and make up part of an "indie sleaze" scene responding to early 21st-century pop music.

== Track listing ==
All tracks are written by Angel Prost and Lulu Prost, except where noted.

1. "Lethal" – 4:10
2. "Birdsong" – 3:07
3. "Stare at the Sun" – 3:33
4. "Marigold" (Blake Ortiz-Goldberg, A. Prost, and L. Prost) – 3:22
5. "Got Me by the Tail" (Jakob Lazovick, A. Prost, and L. Prost) – 2:31
6. "Bernadette" – 3:44
7. "Frost Park" (L. Prost) – 3:17
8. "Not My Fault" (Ortiz-Goldberg, A. Prost, and L. Prost) – 2:57
9. "Oats from a Mug" (A. Prost) – 1:48
10. "Bob Dylan" (A. Prost) – 3:04
11. "Offer My Love" – 5:31

== Personnel ==
Frost Children

- Angel Prost – upright bass, vocals, production, styling
- Lulu Prost – live drums, vocals, production

Additional personnel

- Al Carlson – mixing, mastering
- Gabriella Cossens – package design
- Olive Faber – drum engineering
- Marcus McDonald – editing, photography
- Diane Prost – violin on "Bernadette"
- Marta Tiesenga – saxophone on "Offer My Love"
