= Smile! :D =

2024 studio album by Porter Robinson

Studio album by Porter Robinson
- Released: July 26, 2024
- Genres: Electropop; pop-punk
- Length: 40:03
- Label: Mom + Pop
- Producer: Porter Robinson

Porter Robinson chronology
Nurture (2021)	Smile! :D (2024)

Singles from Smile! :D
- 1. "Cheerleader" Released: March 20, 2024; 2. "Knock Yourself Out XD" Released: April 24, 2024; 3. "Russian Roulette" Released: June 5, 2024; 4. "Kitsune Maison Freestyle" Released: July 19, 2024

Smile! :D (stylized in all uppercase) is the third studio album by the American electronic music producer Porter Robinson, released on July 26, 2024, through Mom + Pop Music. In recording the album, Robinson sought to break away from many stylistic elements of his previous work. The music on the record draws from pop-punk, early 2000s rave, and hyperpop influences.

Four singles – "Cheerleader", "Knock Yourself Out XD", "Russian Roulette", and "Kitsune Maison Freestyle" – were released to promote the work. The album received generally favorable reviews, with critics praising its bold production and emotional depth, though some noted its chaotic structure. The album was supported by a world tour from 2024 to 2025.

== Background ==
Robinson experienced an initial surge of popularity at age 18, after the release of several festival-oriented electronic dance music works such as "Say My Name" (2010) and Spitfire (2011). Robinson grew increasingly dissatisfied with his performances, and said that he experienced "four or five fully-blown anxiety attacks onstage" while touring in 2013. His desire to change his musical style led him to write his debut album, Worlds (2014), a work that DJ Mag's John Ochoa has retrospectively described as a "breakthrough" that precipitated a wider shift in the electronic music industry. In 2016, Robinson released "Shelter", a collaboration with his friend and fellow electronic producer Madeon. In 2017, Robinson produced Virtual Self, a Eurodance- and trance-inspired production released under an alias of the same name. "Ghost Voices", a single from the EP, was nominated for the Grammy Award for Best Dance Recording in 2018. In 2021, Robinson released his second studio album, Nurture, a work which explores his experiences with depression and writer's block and represents a major stylistic shift in his discography, according to AllMusic's Paul Simpson. While writing Nurture, Robinson put pressure on himself to avoid "any kind of trouble", as he started to place more importance on his public identity and found himself restricting his expression on the album as a result. A year after its release, he began to contemplate retiring from musicianship.

== Composition and themes ==
Smile! :D has been described as electropop and pop-punk. Robinson intended to avoid the stylistic elements of his previous work when writing Smile! :D, stating in an interview with Dork that "every project [he has] done has been a total reinvention." Larisha Paul from Rolling Stone concurred, and felt that the album brings the vocal performances and lyrics to the forefront of the production, in contrast with the "atmospheric" sound of Nurture. The album's instrumentation draws from the pop-punk, emo pop, and rave music styles from the early 2000s, as well as modern hyperpop. The Skinny's Ian Macartney found chiptune influences similar to Robinson's contemporaries Anamanaguchi on the opening track "Knock Yourself Out XD". Under the Radar's Caleb Campbell found the record had similarities with early-2000s Y2K aesthetics and the Warped Tour.

The framework for the album's style was conceived during the tour of Nurture, when Robinson performed with a live band. He felt that much of his prior discography focused on personal subject matters, and instead decided to adopt a more lighthearted approach with a "spirit of play" inspired by his experiences on stage. Discussing the composition process, Robinson said he intended to create a work that was "no sincerity, all fun, [and] an album that revels in absurdity for a world that rejects context", but eventually began to write about his emotions. Robinson emphasized songwriting techniques he felt were clichéd, such as common pop chord progressions. Several songs address Robinson's relationship with his fans. "Cheerleader", the second song from the album, is a commentary on the parasocial relationships audience members can develop with artists, and the final track "Everything to Me" is a ballad in which Robinson expresses that he values his audiences.

== Promotion and release ==
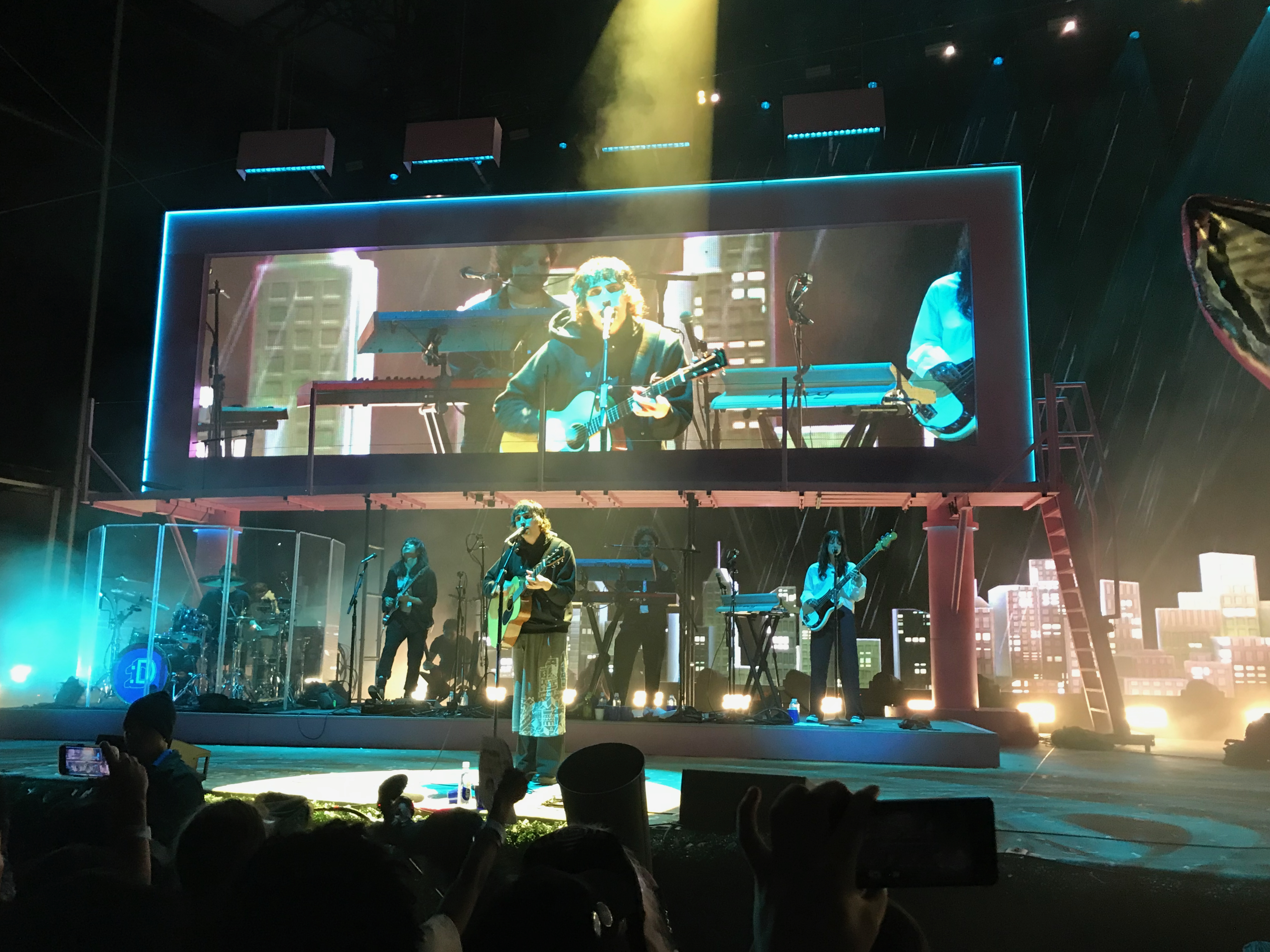
Robinson performing at the Forest Hills Stadium in 2024

On February 29, 2024, Robinson uploaded a video to his YouTube channel describing the end of his career and the erasure of his discography, removing all posts from his Instagram profile. He seemingly confirmed his decision to a reporter that day, which Uproxx's Megan Armstrong described as an "expertly executed troll job". He revealed on March 1 that he had completed his third album, posting promotional images and videos to social media. Robinson later announced a world tour to promote the album, the first of his career, in 2024 and 2025. The tour was supported by Ericdoa, Ninajirachi, Galileo Galilei, and Underscores.

On March 20, 2024, Robinson released the first single for the album, "Cheerleader". On writing the song, he stated that he intended to create something that audiences would "love with zero context – just instantaneous, universal, explosive connection". The song was released with a music video directed by Hugh Mulhern. "Knock Yourself Out XD" followed on April 24. "Russian Roulette", the third single, was released on June 5; Robinson saw the song as a path to addressing the ideas of "oblivion, of career suicide, of disappearing", and finding a balance with his obligations. A lyric video was released on June 13. "Kitsune Maison Freestyle", the fourth and final single, was released on July 19. Robinson had organized a pop-up event at the Maison Kitsuné showroom in Los Angeles the day prior, which drew thousands of attendees. He gave away designer clothes from his wardrobe collectively worth an estimated $50,000. He professed that he was a long-time enthusiast of Maison Kitsuné, and felt it was "primed for a nostalgic revival".

Smile! :D was released for digital streaming by Mom + Pop Music on July 26, 2024. The album was released on vinyl and compact disc on August 23. A music video for "Easier to Love You" was released on August 2, directed by the stop-motion animator Tomoyasu Murata. On August 22, Robinson released a music video for "Year of the Cup", co-directed with Malcolm MacMaster.

On September 17, 2026, Robinson announced a remix album titled Smile! :D Plus+, with a remix of "Perfect Pinterest Garden" by Ninajirachi and Underscores releasing soon after. The remix album features sixteen artists.

== Critical reception ==
Professional ratings
Aggregate scores
Source	Rating
AnyDecentMusic?	7.3/10
Metacritic	75/100
Review scores
Source	Rating
AllMusic	3/5 stars
Clash	7/10
Dork	4/5 stars
The Line of Best Fit	8/10
The Independent	7/10
Our Culture	4/5 stars
Pitchfork	7.1/10
Rolling Stone	4/5 stars
Slant	4/5 stars
The Skinny	4/5 stars
Spectrum Culture	4/5 stars
Sputnikmusic	2.9/5
Under the Radar	8/10 stars

According to the review aggregator website Metacritic, Smile! :D received "generally favorable reviews" based on a weighted average score of 75 out of 100 from nine critics. The aggregator AnyDecentMusic? scored the album 7.3 out of 10 based on nine reviews.

Macartney described Smile! :D as "Robinson's most intimate album yet". He also wrote that the album was "full of swerves", and Dork reviewers commented on the contrast between the album's instrumentation and the highly personal lyrical content. Narzra Ahmed of Clash wrote that the album was "more chaotic than cohesive, which seems intentional in order to reflect [Robinson]'s ranging emotions", calling it "some of his best work yet". However, Sputnikmusic's Jesper L. felt that the album presented its lyrical content in a fashion that was imbalanced and "too careless" with its switches between lighthearted and serious themes.

Multiple reviewers praised the album's production, and felt that Robinson had effectively blended multiple musical styles on the work. While Jesper L. appreciated individual songs, he felt the work as a whole was "overwhelming" in its maximalism, finding the softer tracks such as "Everything to Me" to be forced and insincere. Macartney, however, felt that "Is There Really No Happiness?" was the highlight of the album, appreciating the combination of its breakbeat-style drums and "elegiac ballad" tone.

=== Year-end lists ===
Year-end rankings of Smile! :D
Publication	List	Rank	Ref.
KTLA	The 10 best albums of 2024	4	
Rolling Stone	The 100 best albums of 2024	86	

== Track listing ==
All tracks are written and produced by Porter Robinson, except where noted.

Smile! :D track listing
No.	Title	Writer(s)	Producer(s)	Length
1.	"Knock Yourself Out XD"		Robinson; Gavin Bendt	2:48
2.	"Cheerleader"			3:57
3.	"Russian Roulette"	Robinson; Bendt; Mikey Freedom Hart	Robinson; Bendt; Hart; Luke Shippey	6:28
4.	"Perfect Pinterest Garden"			2:28
5.	"Year of the Cup"			4:22
6.	"Kitsune Maison Freestyle"			3:54
7.	"Easier to Love You"	Robinson; Hart	Robinson; Hart	4:10
8.	"Mona Lisa" (featuring Frost Children)	Robinson; Angel Prost; Lulu Prost	Robinson; Frost Children	3:45
9.	"Is There Really No Happiness?"	Robinson; Bendt; James Ivy; Shippey; Michael Stone	Robinson; Bendt; Ivy; Shippey; Stone	3:19
10.	"Everything to Me"	Robinson; Bendt; Ivy; Shippey; Stone	Robinson; Bendt; Ivy; Shippey	4:52
Total length:				40:03

Smile! :D Plus+: disc one
No.	Title	Length
1.	"Knock Yourself Out XD (DJ Not Porter Robinson and Ashelyy Remix)"	3:13
2.	"Cheerleader (Nitepunk Remix)"	3:40
3.	"Russian Roulette (G Jones Remix)"	5:07
4.	"Perfect Pinterest Garden (Ninajirachi and Underscores Remix)"	2:50
5.	"Year of the Cup (Ejean Remix)"	3:40
6.	"Kitsune Maison Freestyle (Leon Valley Remix)"	3:08
7.	"Easier to Love You (Vertile Remix)"	3:13
8.	"Mona Lisa - Maybe Mashup" (with Frost Children and G Jones)	4:18
9.	"Is There Really No Happiness? (Frost Children Remix)"	6:08
10.	"Everything to Me (Jamesjamesjames Remix)"	7:30
Total length:		42:47

Smile! :D Plus+: disc two
No.	Title	Length
1.	"Cheerleader (DJ Not Porter Robinson Remix)"	2:40
2.	"Cheerleader" (with Jamie Paige, featuring Hatsune Miku)	3:59
3.	"Cheerleader (Control Freak Remix)"	3:03
4.	"Easier to Love You (Galileo Galilei Cover)"	4:34
5.	"Is There Really No Happiness? (Atura Remix)"	3:26
6.	"Is There Really No Happiness? (Joey Valence Remix)"	3:55
Total length:		21:37

=== Notes ===
- Track 9 is titled "Is There Really No Happiness Without This Feeling?" on physical releases of the album.

== Personnel ==
- Porter Robinson – vocals, mixing (track 7)
- Rafa Rodriguez – guitar (track 4)
- Mikey Freedom Hart – drums (tracks 3, 7), synthesizer and banjo (track 7)
- Frost Children – vocals (track 8)
- Georell Magno – drums (track 10)
- Gavin Bendt – mixing (1–6, 8–10); mastering (all tracks)

== Charts ==
Chart performance for Smile! :D
Chart (2024)	Peak position
UK Album Downloads (Official Charts)	49
US Indie Store Album Sales (Billboard)	20
US Top Current Album Sales (Billboard)	50
US Top Dance Albums (Billboard)	10
