= Haru Nemuri =

Japanese singer-songwriter

- 春 ねむり
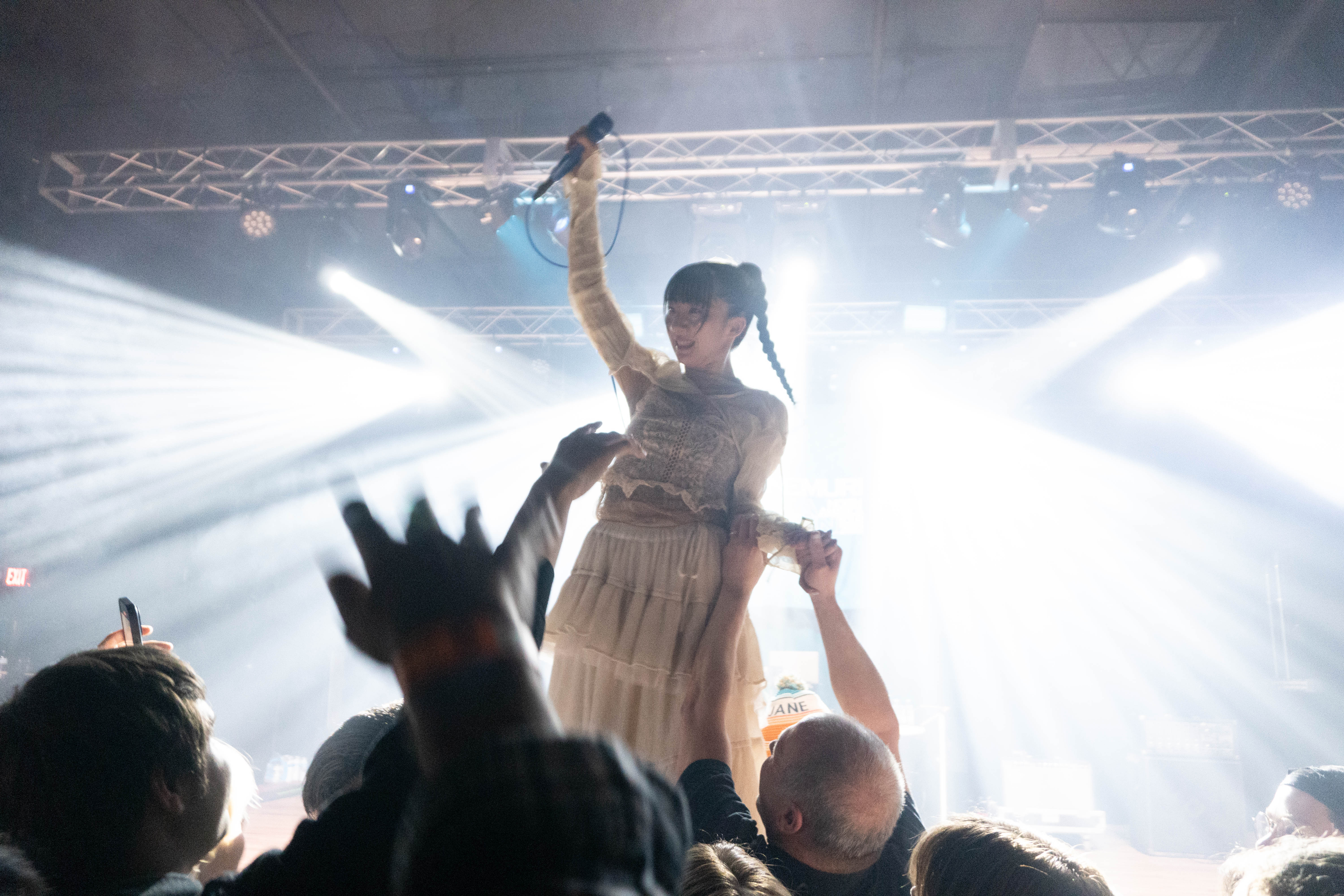
- Haru Nemuri live in 2023
- Born: Haruna Kimishima; January 10, 1995 (age 31); Yokohama, Kanagawa Prefecture, Japan
- Occupations: Singer; songwriter
- Musical career
- Genres: J-pop; Japanese hip hop; noise rock; post-hardcore; electronic
- Years active: 2016–present
- Labels: Specific (France); TO3S (Japan) 2018-2024 ekkolaptómenos (Japan) 2025-Present
- Website: harunemuri.love

Haruna Kimishima (君島 悠奈, Kimishima Haruna), known by her stage name Haru Nemuri (春 ねむり, Haru Nemuri), is a Japanese singer, songwriter, and "poetry rapper". Her musical style mixes influences from J-pop, rap, post-hardcore, experimental pop, art rock, and electronica. She is currently based in Tokyo.

== Life and career ==
Kimishima grew up in the Isogo Ward of Yokohama, Japan. In early life, Kimishima mentions that she was "like a child of emptiness itself" and was unable to understand herself. In high school, she gradually started to recognize her emotions when she started to make music. When she was 17, she formed a duo band with her friend playing the synths and learned how to make tracks. After they disbanded, Kimishima began her career as Haru Nemuri when she was 21.

=== 2016–2017: Sayonara, Youth Phobia and Atom Heart Mother ===
In October 2016, Haru Nemuri made her debut by releasing her first mini-album Sayonara, Youth Phobia.

In June 2017, her second mini-album Atom Heart Mother was released. The release event took place at Shibuya Loft 9 in Tokyo. In September, she released her first double A-side single "Hello@New World" / "Torikobo Sareta Machi Kara Ai wo Komete," which was written with Japanese singer-songwriter Mariko Goto. On October 26, Nemuri held her first one-man live titled Boku wo Saishuu Heiki ni shita nowa Kimi sa at Musashino Kokaido, Tokyo.

=== 2018–2019: Haru to Shura ===
Haru Nemuri released her first full album Haru to Shura on April 11, 2018 and gained international attention. Realizing that her music was being internationally accepted, Nemuri became active in reaching out to her international audiences and performed her first overseas show in Taiwan at the Spring Scream 2018. Nemuri continued to promote the album through shows and events in Tokyo. In August, she released her EP Kick in the World which had been written for the MOOSIC LAB 2017 exhibition movie "eternal/spring movie". Kick in the World was quickly highlighted internationally, where Stereogum chose the EP as its number 1 song of the week. She released two digital singles titled "I Wanna" in September and "Tokyo (Ewig Wiederkehren)" in October, the latter of which was a rearranged version of "Tokyo" on Sayonara, Youth Phobia. Nemuri returned to Taiwan in October to perform a show at the 巨獸搖滾音樂祭 8.0 BEASTIE ROCK FESTIVAL.

One year after its release, Haru to Shura became available in vinyl throughout Europe through Specific Recordings. Between March and April 2019, Haru Nemuri took off on the Hello! Ni Hao! Konnichiwa! ASIA TOUR 2019, her first Asian tour, with Mariko Goto. The tour had shows in Hong Kong, Shanghai, Beijing, Taiwan and Tokyo. From May to June, she performed 14 shows on the Haru to Shura European Tour 2019. This included performances at Primavera Sound 2019 in Spain, Nippon Connection Film Festival 2019 and the Wilwarin Festival 2019 in Germany. In October, she contributed the track "Kick in the World (Alternate Version)" to The Needle Drop LP, a curated charity compilation.

=== 2020–2023: Lovetheism and Shunka Ryougen ===
On January 10, 2020, Nemuri released the single "Fanfare." The music video for the single was shot under extreme temperatures over the frozen Amur River in Russia. In March, the single "Riot" was released, alongside a music video filmed at the Russian Circus in Moscow. "Fanfare" and "Riot" preceded the mini-album Lovetheism, which was released on March 20. In March, Nemuri was scheduled to perform at South by Southwest, but the festival was cancelled due to COVID-19. In place of the cancelled show, she held a livestream performance on YouTube called Unused VISA on March 23. In June, Nemuri shared the music video for "Trust Nothing but Love" (Japanese title: Ai Yori Tashika na Mono Nante Nai). On June 19, she released a fundraiser single titled "Heart of Gold (Demo)" through her Bandcamp in support of the Black Lives Matter protest movement, with all sales being donated to the NAACP.

Haru Nemuri released "Bang" on January 15, 2021 along with a music video. Both the song and music video had been done remotely online between Tokyo and Los Angeles, with the video being filmed in Skid Row Downtown Los Angeles. Nemuri shared a long statement about the song and the inspiration behind it, in which she discusses social division and the hope she finds in 'praying.' On March 21, she made an appearance on the SXSW Online 2021 with a full one shot take show from Tokyo. This performance had been highlighted by the New York Times and Nemuri was chosen as one of their "15 Best Acts" from the festival. Within the same month, the single "Inori Dake Ga Aru" was released. Nemuri later mentioned in an interview that she wrote the song when she was going through a catastrophically rough time with death in mind and wrote the song with only prayers of saving herself. Because of this, she did not plan to release it. "Seventh Heaven," the theme song of the movie, Colorless (Japanese: Sarugakucho de Aimasho) was released as a single on May 28. Nemuri followed that up with the single "Old Fashioned" in July. The music video for the song includes subtitled English lyrics that directly express her anger and resignation towards society. On October 1, Nemuri released the single "Déconstruction" which was co-produced with the producer duo MyRiot. Nemuri explained "It's a song for all souls to be so noble. When you fight for your soul, this song is for you." She further explained "'We should destroy that structure,' as a way of overturning the dichotomous way of thinking that had been prevalent in Western philosophy up to that point. I felt that this was what our world needs right now."

In March 2022, Haru Nemuri embarked on her first North American tour which had previously been postponed four times due to the pandemic. The tour had sold out performances in New York, Chicago, San Francisco, Los Angeles, and Dallas. Nemuri also appeared at SXSW Music Festival 2022 and was praised for having one of the best performances of the festival by Austin Chronicle and Paste Magazine. Nemuri also appeared on stage with Pussy Riot performing the song "Police State." After her North American tour, Nemuri surprise released the single "Ikiru" as the lead single from her upcoming album. It was released alongside a music video starring Japanese actress Ruka Ishikawa. A part of Shuntaro Tanikawa's literary work, "Ikiru" is quoted in the song by poetry reading, being used with direct permission from Tanikawa himself. When asked in an interview, Nemuri stated "'Ikiru' is about when you feel that momentary notice that you can still be alive. I wrote it when I felt that moment and made it into a song from the bottom of my heart. But it was really tough when I sung it today... I usually live my life forgetting about that feel, so every time I sing or listen to it, it makes me think that there are moments like this in life."

On April 22, Haru Nemuri released her second full album, Shunka Ryougen, which included all her singles released from 2021 to 2022. The album received critical acclaim such as an 8/10 from Pitchfork, as well as year end placements on lists by Pitchfork and Spin. On September 13, Haru Nemuri held a kick off party for her Shunka Ryougen North America Tour 2022 at Space Odd Shibuya in Tokyo, Japan. In October, she officially embarked on the tour which included a show at the Pop Montreal Festival in Montreal, and thirteen shows in the United States. After the third show, Nemuri tested positive for COVID-19 and several shows were postponed. The tour restarted from Dallas, Texas and ended in Portland, Oregon.

The tour continued into East Asia in 2023, where she performed at the Maho Rasop Festival in Thailand, Okinawa, and Taiwan, including a show at the Emerge Festival in Taipei. She then resumed her North American tour to complete a string of shows which were postponed from the year before. Nemuri stopped in Austin, Texas for several shows at the SXSW 2023, including a show at the Dr. Martens Presents stage along with Danny Brown. There, Haru Nemuri performed "Old Fashioned" with Taiwanese-rappers SiNNER MOON and Peatle, as well as "Angry Angry" with Jaguar Jonze. "Angry Angry," along with "don't call me queen," another song with Jaguar Jonze, saw an official release in April. Returning to Asia, Nemuri performed at the City ROARS! Festival in Malaysia and the tour continued into the United Kingdom. Nemuri completed the tour in Tokyo, at the Liquid Room titled Shunka Ryougen Tour Final on July 1, 2023 with Shinsei Kamattechan as the guest opener of the show.

=== 2023–present: INSAINT and ekkolaptómenos ===
A few days before her Shunka Ryougen Tour Final, Nemuri released a single titled "Wrecked", expressing protest against the proposed 'Immigration Control and Refugee Recognition Act Amendment' which was passed in Japan on June 9th. The song was created while she was in London for her UK Tour. Haru Nemuri appeared at the Creepy Teepee Festival in Czech Republic closing the entire festival on July 16th. In the same month, Nemuri appeared at several more festivals in Europe including a show at the CONGÉS ANNULÉS in Luxembourg and the OFF Festival in Katowice, Poland. Right after her return, she released the single "I Refuse" (Japanese title: わたしは拒絶する) from her EP INSAINT, a portmanteau of insane and saint. The record was Nemuri's first to be recorded by a full live band, as she wanted to learn how to hone into her hardcore punk sound live. INSAINT was released on September 29. Haru Nemuri left a statement on a liner note:

‘For everyone who feels left behind by the system and the confines of what is considered ‘normal’, who continue to doubt themselves and suffer while living in the present, may this album, the hardcore punk of 2023, the feminism, exist for you. It was created with all my prayers.’

In 2023, Haru Nemuri contributed the song "Let It Go as If You Wander" to the soundtrack of Cyberpunk 2077. The track was included on the in-game radio station 89.7 Growl FM, introduced in the Phantom Liberty expansion. The song was chosen through a community-driven contest and gained recognition within the game’s global player base.

In February 2024, Haru Nemuri held her first New Zealand and Australian tour. In support of INSAINT, she kicked off her Flee from the Sanctuary Tour from August 2024. The Japan tour ended in Tokyo, Shibuya WWW X with Mass of the Fermenting Dregs opening the show. The U.S. tour lasted from the end of September into mid October in 6 cities. In September, Nemuri and Frost Children announced a collaboration EP titled Soul Kiss. The EP was released on October 4 and was preceded by the lead single "Daijoubu Desu" in September.

On March 1, 2025, Haru Nemuri announced her third full-length album, ekkolaptómenos. The self-produced record marks her first album release since going independent and launching her own label of the same name in January 2025. On March 7, just a week after the announcement of her album, a single titled "anointment" was released. She released her second single from the album titled "panopticon" on May 9, along with the announcement of her ekkolaptómenos North America Tour. The third single, "symposium" was released on June 20, followed by "iconoclasm" on July 18. ekkolaptómenos was released on August 1, 2025.

== Critical response ==
Anthony Fantano of The Needle Drop reviewed her debut album Haru to Shura, mentioning that "Haru Nemuri's debut album pushes J-pop/rap in an exciting direction by channeling Japan's rich history of underground rock music."

Shunka Ryougen had been hailed by Pitchfork ("Blending elements of J-pop, rap, and hardcore, the experimental Japanese artist's latest album presents a convincing balance of nihilism and hope."), and also from The Fader, Spectrum Culture ("Nemuri looked to the balance of life and death and represents their intersection. That's why the album is as celebratory as it is volcanic), Stereogum ("We named genre-exploding Japanese musician Haru Nemuri, who mixes pop, rock, and hip-hop into her own beautifully experimental cocktail, one of the best new artists of 2018."), and Ones to Watch ("Treasure. We are constantly looking for it and by its very nature it remains elusive....everything about Haru Nemuri is comfortably atypical."). Spin stated "Rather than merely recreate her debut, Haru Nemuri chose deconstruction for her second album. The word appears throughout Shunka Ryougen's song titles, and it's key to how the record reconfigures Nemuri's blend of art rock, noise pop, and hip-hop"

== Artistry ==
=== Influences ===
Haru Nemuri has mentioned Shimura Masahiko (Fujifabric), Seiko Oomori, Shinsei Kamattechan, Björk, and Susumu Hirasawa as her major influences. She also mentions Fugazi taught her what hardcore is and The Clash and Yeah Yeah Yeahs showed her that "rock 'n' roll can exist as art". She also mentioned Rage Against the Machine had taught her "Art exists in a dimension that is inseparable from society and (thanks to them) I learned how to think about that responsibility." Nemuri has also expressed love for Aurora's music. She contacted the producer duo MyRiot who previously worked with Aurora to co-produce Nemuri's song "Déconstruction".

She has covered some of her influences' songs, including "Police State" by Pussy Riot, which she performed live with them at SXSW 2022.

=== Ideology and themes ===
Nemuri has touched on her ideology in regards to punk; she believes it is about love, anger, kindness and living in the world and society, where she personally feels that it is inevitable or very natural to be associated with feminism.

She has introduced herself as a "riot grrrl", which she believes is "one of the few 'names' that I feel I can use my energy to live with or fight against the inconveniences and biases that come from advocating it." In an interview, she said, "Within myself, my music is inherently pernicious and cannot be harmless to everyone. If it is treated as harmless by bias or prejudice, I think that's not right, and would like everyone to touch it as such." Nemuri mentioned, "There's no way it's not violent to appeal something to someone. I don't want it to turn into war, massacre, or discrimination, so I'm doing music. I know it's hot and depressing. 'Do you know how mankind won democracy? It must have started with anger!'" Nemuri added, "Taking away the power to think is the easiest way for those who rule and those who obtain wealth. It may sound like an exaggeration, but if this sounds like an exaggeration, you've probably been robbed. I think art is the most peaceful way to fight against such things. That's why I want to compete with art."

Nemuri often uses the word "Rock 'n' Roll" in her lyrics and mentioned, "I think that rock 'n' roll is something that continues to become new all the time. Change is a very scary thing, but if you don't continue to update, in the true sense you won't be able to be kind."

In an interview with Billboard Japan, Nemuri explained, "I try to make sure that the voices of the parties concerned aren't lost in my words. I also try to consider each time whether the anger I'm feeling is really something I should be expressing... I'm open about the fact that I'm a liberal feminist, so people who defend contrary positions don't approach me very often...They're for me; I write my songs in desperation, in order to survive. Things that are done in desperation have energy, so there might be people who are pulled along by it, and I also believe that writing songs and presenting them is a violent act like hitting someone. I compose and write lyrics feeling pain, coexisting with the thought that 'people might be better off not knowing things like this.' It's almost like I'm experiencing life through pain."

Since the start of the Gaza war in 2023, Nemuri has repeatedly used her social media platforms and on stage performances to call for a ceasefire, an end to Israeli occupation of Palestine, saying "we oppose Israel's occupation and massacre of Palestine and call for a ceasefire." Nemuri expressed that she worried that her pro-Palestine views could impact her international touring opportunities, including fears around U.S. visa issues. She released a song titled "Watermelon (demo)" in 2023 expressing her "opposition to Israel's occupation of Palestine."

During the 2025 Japanese House of Councillors election campaign period, Nemuri released diss track 'IGMF' on Soundcloud, criticizing far-right political party Sanseitō and their Tokyo district candidate Saya for stoking anti-foreigner sentiment.

Starting in April 2026, Nemuri has held a series of 'Guerilla Afternoon Tea' public picnic events, with the aim of providing a free and open space for dialog about a variety of societal issues. The first was held in front of the National Diet Building amongst a protest against the revision of Japan's pacifist constitution clause.

== Discography ==
=== Studio albums ===
Title	Information
Haru to Shura春と修羅	Released: April 11, 2018; Formats: Digital download, CD, vinyl
Shunka Ryougen 春火燎原	Released: April 22, 2022; Formats: Digital download, CD, vinyl
ekkolaptómenos	Release: August 1, 2025; Formats: TBD

=== Mini albums ===
Title	Information
Sayonara, Youthphobia さよなら、ユースフォビア	Released: October 12, 2016; Formats: CD
Atom Heart Mother アトム・ハート・マザー	Released: June 7, 2017; Formats: CD
Lovetheism	Released: March 20, 2020; Formats: Digital download, vinyl
INSAINT	Released: September 29, 2023; Formats: Digital download, vinyl

=== EPs ===
Title	Information
Kick in the World	Released: August 29, 2018; Formats: Digital download
HARU NEMURI x Frost Children "Soul Kiss"	Released: October 4, 2024; Formats: Digital download

=== Singles ===
Title	Year	Album
"Hello@New World" / "Torikobosareta Machi Kara Ai wo Komete"	2017	Non-album singles
"I Wanna"	2018	Non-album singles
"Tokyo (Ewig Wiederkehren)"	2018	Non-album singles
"Fanfare"	2020	Lovetheism
"Riot"	2020	Lovetheism
"Heart of Gold" (Demo)	2020	Non-album single
"bang"	2021	Shunka Ryougen
"Inori Dake ga Aru"	2021	Shunka Ryougen
"Seventh Heaven"	2021	Shunka Ryougen
"Old Fashioned"	2021	Shunka Ryougen
"Déconstruction"	2021	Shunka Ryougen
"Ikiru"	2022	Shunka Ryougen
"Old Fashioned" (with PIZZALI, SiNNER MOON & Peatle)	2023	Non-album singles
"Angry Angry" / "Don't Call Me Queen" (with Jaguar Jonze)	2023	Non-album singles
"Wrecked"	2023	Non-album singles
"I Refuse"	2023	INSAINT
"Daijoubu Desu"(with Frost Children)	2024	Soul Kiss
"Don't make love vow" (featuring Pyra)	2024	Non-album single
"anointment"	2025	ekkolaptómenos
"panopticon"	2025	ekkolaptómenos
"symposium"	2025	ekkolaptómenos
"iconoclasm"	2025	ekkolaptómenos

=== Featured songs ===
Title	Year	Album
"sore eyes" (GOMESS with Haru Nemuri)	2016	Haikei -Kouhen-
"Ghost Noise" (NELHATE featuring Haru Nemuri)	2016	TEN ELEVEN
"Kakkoii Dance" (THE BASSONS featuring Haru Nemuri, Saki)	2018	Kata Me ga kataru! Band ga Hiku! Tataku!
"Return" (Prune Deer featuring Haru Nemuri)	2019	Insufficient Postage
"graspingatstraws" (Nap Head featuring Haru Nemuri)	2020	my sleeping bag
"Jasmine" (Fall of Tears featuring Haru Nemuri)	2022	Never forget, Never regret.
"No Muse" (AFSHEEN featuring Haru Nemuri)	2023	Small World
"naughty AI" (Pyra featuring Haru Nemuri)	2025	naughty AI
"tale chasing" yeti let you notice	2025	hontounokoto

=== Extended Plays ===
Title	Year
"HARU NEMURI on Audiotree LIVE"	2023

=== Other appearances ===
Title	Year	Album
"Kick in the World - Alternate Version"	2019	The Needle Drop LP
"Let It Go As If You Wander"	2023	Cyberpunk 2077: 89.7 Growl FM

== Awards and nominations ==
Organisation	Year	Category	Nominated work	Result	Ref.
Apple Vinegar Music Award	2023	Nominee	Shunka Ryougen	Nominated	
Forbes Japan	2023	30 Under 30 2023 Honoree	Herself	Won	
