= Detour (Kim Petras album) =

2026 studio album by Kim Petras

- Standard edition cover

Studio album by Kim Petras
- Released: 29 May 2026
- Genre: Hyperpop
- Length: 36:38
- Labels: BunHead; Amigo
- Producers: BC Kingdom; Eric Cross; Frost Children; Italian Leather; Jonny Rocks; Margo XS; Nightfeelings; Kim Petras; Sophie; Porches

Kim Petras chronology
| Slut Pop Miami (2024) | Detour (2026) |

Alternative cover
- Rare n' Deluxe cover

Singles from Detour
- 1. "Polo" Released: 27 June 2025; 2. "Freak It" Released: 25 July 2025; 3. "I Like Ur Look" Released: 14 October 2025; 4. "Need for Speed" Released: 22 April 2026; 5. "Jeep" Released: 6 May 2026

Singles from Detour (Rare n' Deluxe)
- 1. "Pop Sound" Released: 15 July 2026

Detour is the third studio album by German singer Kim Petras. It was released on 29 May 2026 through Amigo and BunHead Records. It marks her first independent release since 2020, following her departure from Republic Records in 2026. Five singles supported the album: "Polo", "Freak It", "I Like Ur Look", "Need for Speed", and "Jeep". On 10 September 2026, Petras announced the deluxe edition of the album, subtitled Rare n' Deluxe, which was released on 18 September, containing the previously released song "Pop Sound" with 4 new tracks.

== Background ==
Petras, who pioneered the hyperpop genre along with fellow trans woman Sophie, released Feed the Beast in 2023, which was unsuccessful commercially and critically. Whilst on a tour promoting it, she told fans she was already working on her next album. In a 2024 interview with Paper she stated that the album was "definitely going to be really different for me". After finding herself churning out pop songs she found uninspiring, she booked nighttime sessions with hyperpop producers Frost Children and Margo XS, with whom she made music inspired by lowbrow electronic dance music.

Prior to the album's release, Petras publicly alleged that her label Republic Records had delayed both the project and its associated singles despite the album having been completed months earlier. In January 2026, Petras posted on X that she had requested to be released from the label due to frustrations over a lack of creative and professional control, and also claimed that a self-funded music video for "Need for Speed" had remained unreleased for more than two months.

== Singles and promotion ==
On 27 June 2025, Petras released "Polo" as the lead single, stating it was "the first song that kinda reset all of the music I was working on." "Freak It" was subsequently released on 25 July. Petras released a vertical music video via her social media for the track on 12 November. "I Like Ur Look" was surprise-released on 14 October as the third single alongside a music video. Petras held listening parties for the album in Paris in November 2025 and Los Angeles in March 2026.

After months of label issues and delays, Petras announced a project called Pretour in February 2026. Each song in the project would release every week only on her social media, YouTube, and SoundCloud, starting 10 February with "Pop Sound". The four tracks have features from BC Kingdom and Cortisa Star. Petras stated these songs were not on Detour, writing on X, "These songs are what led me to writing Detour, I love them so much but they are their own separate thing." Petras also stated she still did not have a release date for Detour.

Petras left Republic sometime in April and released "Need for Speed" as the album's fourth single on 22 April via her own label, BunHead, and Amigo, followed by its Ashley Hood-directed music video. "Jeep" was released two weeks later as the fifth single. Petras performed the song on The Tonight Show starring Jimmy Fallon on 8 May. On 21 May, Petras unveiled the release date and cover for Detour via her social media.

The album was released on 29 May, with a music video for the single "Brutalist" the same day. "Brutalist" was inspired by her experiences driving past the Post-Pyramide in Hamburg on her way to appointments for her gender-affirming care. Among the tracks on the album was "Basketball", which dates back to 2019 and was posthumously co-produced by Sophie, who had died in 2021.

On 29 September, Petras announced De-Tour, a five-date long tour across the US kicking off 1 December. She was also announced as part of the Laneway Festival which will take place in February 2027.

== Music and lyrics ==
"DTLA" and "101" features sexual lyrics and "aggressive" synthesizers and vocal tone. "I Like Ur Look" taps into Y2K nostalgia while "Polo" references social status via fashion. "Brutalist" is about her childhood wounds. "Need for Speed" has a dance-pop sound while "Jeep" sings about the pain of heartbreak over an acoustic melody. On "Korea," Petras sings about her career struggles, twisting the pronunciation of career.

== Critical reception ==
Professional ratings
Review scores
| Source | Rating |
|---|---|
| IZM | 4/5 stars |
| Pitchfork | 7.6/10 |
| Riff Magazine | 10/10 |
| Rolling Stone | 3.5/5 stars |
| The Needle Drop | 7/10 |

Harry Tafoya of Pitchfork rated the album 7.6 out of 10, writing that the album is Petras' "true artistic debut" with her "swerving between noisy club bangers and newly subtle pop gems". Tafoya added that "Brutalist" is her "greatest song to date". Vera Maksymiuk of Riff Magazine rated the album 10 out of 10, writing that the album is her best work and a "catalyst for breaking free". Larisha Paul of Rolling Stone rated the album 3.5 out of 5 stars, writing that she "finds a path forward with new producers and a clear vision for the future of her career".

Park Si-hun of IZM rated the album 4 out of 5 stars. He wrote that while the album embraces contemporary pop music, its self-expression reflects Petras' rebellious spirit. He added that its inclusive "pop sensibility" reveals her maturity as an artist.

Anthony Fantano of The Needle Drop gave the album a 7/10. Fantano criticized the album's underdeveloped themes and songwriting, but praised its upbeat production.

== Track listing ==
Standard track listing
| No. | Title | Writer(s) | Producer(s) | Length |
|---|---|---|---|---|
| 1. | "Detour" | Kim Petras; Angel Prost; Lulu Prost; Nick Weiss | Frost Children | 2:36 |
| 2. | "DTLA" | Petras; Madison Love; A. Prost; L. Prost; Weiss; Margo Wildman; Eli Sheppard | Frost Children; Margo XS; Nightfeelings | 3:20 |
| 3. | "I Like Ur Look" | Petras; Love; A. Prost; L. Prost; Weiss; Wildman | Petras; Frost Children; Margo XS; Nightfeelings | 2:51 |
| 4. | "Check It" | Petras; Eric Cross; Aaron Maine; Weiss | Petras; Frost Children; Margo XS; Nightfeelings | 1:51 |
| 5. | "Polo" | Petras; Liam Hall; Love; Weiss; Wildman | Petras; Margo XS^{[p]}; Nightfeelings; Atlgrandma^{[a]} | 2:31 |
| 6. | "Brutalist" | Petras; Maine; Weiss | Nightfeelings; Porches | 2:57 |
| 7. | "Need for Speed" | Petras; Love; A. Prost; L. Prost; Weiss; Wildman | Petras; Frost Children; Margo XS; Nightfeelings | 3:15 |
| 8. | "Jeep" | Petras; Eric Cross; Maine; Weiss | Petras; Cross; Nightfeelings; Porches; Margo XS^{[c]} | 3:29 |
| 9. | "101" | Petras; Love; Weiss; Wildman | Frost Children; Margo XS; Nightfeelings | 3:14 |
| 10. | "Basketball" | Petras; Chris Cummings; Johnathan Jean-Luc Pashayan; Eric Scroggins; Jonathan Simone; Sophie; Wildman | Sophie; BC Kingdom; Italian Leather^{[c]}; Jonny Rocks^{[c]}; Margo XS ^{[c]} | 2:39 |
| 11. | "Bitch Ball Out" | Petras; Love; A. Prost; L. Prost; Wildman | Frost Children; Margo XS | 2:09 |
| 12. | "Korea" | Petras; Maine; Weiss; Wildman | Margo XS; Nightfeelings; Porches | 2:40 |
| 13. | "Freak It" | Petras; Wildman; Love; Weiss; A. Prost; L. Prost | Petras; Frost Children; Margo XS^{[p]}; Nightfeelings | 3:05 |
| Total length: | | | | 36:38 |

Rare n' Deluxe edition track listing
| No. | Title | Writer(s) | Producer(s) | Length |
|---|---|---|---|---|
| 1. | "Pop Sound" | Petras; A. Prost; L. Prost; Weiss | Petras; Frost Children; Nightfeelings | 2:51 |
| 15. | "Rare n' Deluxe" | Petras; Love; Wildman | Petras; Margo XS | 2:40 |
| 16. | "Like a Cherry" | Petras; Love; Wildman; Johnny Jewel; Megan Louise Doyle | Desire; Margo XS | 2:55 |
| 17. | "Autobahn" | Petras; Hall; Jakob Stǒkl | Margo XS; Nightfeelings; Atlgrandma; UHD | 4:18 |
| 18. | "What a Night" | Petras; Wildman; A. Prost; L. Prost | Margo XS; Frost Children | 2:33 |
| Total length: | | | | 51:55 |

=== Notes ===
- ^{^[p]} signifies a producer and vocal producer.
- ^{^[c]} signifies a co-producer.
- ^{^[a]} signifies an additional producer.
- Tracks 2–14 of the Rare n' Deluxe edition correspond to tracks 1–13 of the standard edition, respectively.

== Personnel ==
Credits are adapted from Tidal.

- Kim Petras – lead vocals (all tracks), programming (track 13)
- Nathan Dantzler – mastering
- Oren Ratowsky – mixing (1, 4, 6, 7, 9–13)
- Tom Norris – mixing (2, 3, 5)
- Margo XS – programming, synthesizer (3, 5, 13)
- Atlgrandma – programming (5)
- Jon Castelli – mixing (8)
- Nightfeelings – programming (13)

== Charts ==
Chart performance for Detour
| Chart (2026) | Peak position |
|---|---|
| Australian Albums (ARIA) | 64 |
| Portuguese Albums (AFP) | 162 |
| UK Album Downloads (Official Charts) | 51 |
| US Top Dance Albums (Billboard) | 15 |
