= I Love You Cutie, I Envy You =

I<3UQTINVU

Remix album by Jockstrap
- Released: 3 November 2023
- Length: 31:11
- Label: Rough Trade
- Producer: Taylor Skye

Jockstrap chronology
I Love You Jennifer B (2022)	I<3UQTINVU (2023)

Singles from I<3UQTINVU
- 1. "Red Eye" Released: 12 September 2023; 2. "Good Girl" Released: 18 October 2023

I<3UQTINVU (pronounced "I Love You Cutie, I Envy You") is the first remix album by British duo Jockstrap, released on 3 November 2023 through Rough Trade Records. It is built around samples of the duo's debut album I Love You Jennifer B (2022) and includes collaborations with Babymorocco, Coby Sey, Ersatz, Ian Starr and Kirin J Callinan. The album received positive reviews from critics.

== Background ==
Taylor Skye said he made most of the remixes "really quickly, in a day or so" from three years to six months before the album's announcement in October 2023 and did not "really remember making them", likening the process to "eating too much and then throwing up and this is what comes out". The album is not a sequential remix of I Love You Jennifer B (2022), and the tracks' titles are different and taken from the samples around which they are built.

== Critical reception ==
Professional ratings
Aggregate scores
Source	Rating
Metacritic	77/100
Review scores
Source	Rating
Exclaim!	6/10
The Independent	4/5 stars
NME	4/5 stars
Pitchfork	7.5/10
The Skinny	4/5 stars

I<3UQTINVU received a score of 77 out of 100 on review aggregator Metacritic based on seven critics' reviews, indicating "generally favorable" reception. NME's Max Pilley called it a "kaleidoscope of broken voice shards, fragmented acoustics and cyberpunk electronics" of the duo's debut album, remarking that "you get flashes of recognition, yes, but in most cases, the tracks have been passed through terrifyingly deviant avant-dance manipulations", concluding that it is "much more than a remix album" and "must be considered as an entirely separate, and brilliant, full-length Jockstrap album on its own terms". The Skinny's Jamie Wilde stated that "everything from hyperpop to spoken word and nu-core is covered here, pushing many tracks to the brink of fun absurdity in only a way that Jockstrap could do".

Helen Brown of The Independent felt that "so many ideas have gone into I<3UQTINVU that it's almost a new album in its own right" and although "not quite as brilliant as I Love You Jennifer B, it does suggest the restless duo are moving into more thrilling terrain". Reviewing the album for Pitchfork, Hattie Lindert wrote that it "pushes" the songs from the group's debut to "mischievous, high-energy places" and "scrambles the formula further, zigzagging into grime, chiptune, and harder EDM". Eric Hill of Exclaim! wrote that the album "reconstructs its predecessor's elements with a post-whatever, anything-goes ethos; In Skye's spaghetti-at-the-wall approach to music making, everything and anything can be turned into a beat". Hill found the first half to be "the most cohesive" and the latter half "more chaotic and dislocated".

== Track listing ==
I<3UQTINVU track listing
No.	Title	Length
1.	"Sexy" (featuring Babymorocco)	4:15
2.	"All Roads Lead to London" (featuring Coby Sey and Ersatz)	2:05
3.	"Good Girl"	4:02
4.	"I Touch"	4:39
5.	"I Feel"	2:36
6.	"Pain Is Real"	3:44
7.	"Red Eye" (featuring Ian Starr)	1:57
8.	"I Noticed You" (featuring Kirin J. Callinan)	4:21
9.	"Sexy 2"	3:32
Total length:		31:11

== Charts ==
Chart performance for I<3UQTINVU
Chart (2023)	Peak position
UK Independent Albums (OCC)	33
