= Knock Yourself Out XD =

Single by Porter Robinson

from the album Smile! :D
- Released: April 24, 2024
- Genre: Synth-pop
- Length: 2:48
- Label: Mom + Pop
- Songwriter: Porter Robinson
- Producers: Porter Robinson; Gavin Bendt

Porter Robinson singles chronology
"Cheerleader" (2024)	"Knock Yourself Out XD" (2024)	"Russian Roulette" (2024)

Music video
- "Knock Yourself Out XD" on YouTube

"Knock Yourself Out XD" is a song recorded by the American musician Porter Robinson. It was released on April 24, 2024, through Mom + Pop as the second single from his third studio album, Smile! :D. It was accompanied by a music video.

== Composition ==
On the song's sounds and melody, Alex Rigotti of NME said that "Knock Yourself Out XD" shows Robinson going towards a pop direction. Rigotti called it "euphoric". Robin Murray of Clash described the song as "a pop trailblazer, a rock of future-facing production and incredible energy." Paul Simpson of AllMusic described how "the song's sunny, guitar-driven melody eventually gives way to a drum'n'bass-influenced coda". Clash's Robin Murray described it as "quite upbeat [with] a playful, Y2K sound". Eric Torres from Pitchfork described the song as "fizzy synthpop" and wrote that the song "circles restlessly around the producer's earnest, unvarnished vocal delivery and an earworm 8-bit melody."

The song's lyrics were touched on by numerous reviewers. Dan Harrison of Dork noted that they "indulg[e] in playful self-awareness" through "pop culture references and personal anecdotes". Pitchfork reviewer Anna Gaca noted the satirical and tongue-in-cheek approach Robinson takes towards celebrity-worship culture, highlighting his irreverent and humorous treatment of being a celebrity. The Independent reviewer Carla Feric also commented on the tongue-in-cheek nature of the lyrics, describing it as "fun" and "adding brightness" to Smile! :D. Writing for Billboard, Jason Lipshutz remarked that Robinson "jump[s] between sardonic one-liners and hooks that could satisfy stadiums" in the song. Simpson described the lyrics as an example of Smile! :D's "goofy, often self-deprecating humor". Murray said that the song is "honest and personal".

== Release and reception ==
"Knock Yourself Out XD" was released on April 24, 2024, through Mom + Pop. It accompanied by a music video directed by Uncanny and creatively directed by Bradley & Pablo. Murray described the video as "some wicked visuals".

Murray said that the track "is definitely a strong opener and one of [Clash's] favorite tracks from the album".

Gaca praised the catchy melody and clever lyrics, framing the song as an enjoyable critique of both celebrity status and fan expectations.

Harrison wrote that the song "encapsulates [Smile! :D's] ability to be both deeply introspective and unabashedly fun".

On May 1, 2025, "Knock Yourself Out XD", alongside its preceding single "Cheerleader", was added to Dance Dance Revolution World.

=== Year-end lists ===
Year-end rankings of "Knock Yourself Out XD"
Publication	List	Rank	Ref.
The Fader	The 50 Best Songs of 2024	41	
Paste	The 100 Best Songs of 2024	48	

== Charts ==
Chart performance for "Knock Yourself Out XD"
Chart (2024)	Peak position
US Hot Dance/Electronic Songs (Billboard)	39

== Release history ==
Version	Region	Date	Format(s)	Label
Original	Worldwide	April 24, 2024	Digital download; streaming	Mom + Pop
