= Blaketheman1000 =

American musician

- Born: Blake Ortiz-Goldberg; December 16, 1996 (age 29); Southern California, USA
- Genres: Bedroom pop; hip-hop
- Years active: 2017–present
- Labels: Pizzaslime Records; Future Classic

Blake Ortiz-Goldberg (born December 16, 1996), known professionally as Blaketheman1000, is an American musician, artist and record producer based in New York City. He gained attention in the early 2020s through the Dimes Square music and art scene in Lower Manhattan. In 2026, he released his debut album City of Careless Angels.

== Early life ==
Blake Ortiz-Goldberg was born on December 16, 1996 in Southern California. He grew up in the Los Angeles area, including Huntington Beach, California. His grandfather (a member of 1960s East LA band Thee Counts) taught him guitar and singing during his youth. Ortiz-Goldberg cites a wide range of early musical influences, from Lou Reed and Linkin Park to Usher and Green Day.

== Career ==
In 2018, Ortiz-Goldberg moved to New York City and became a part of the Dimes Square scene. He began making music in college, releasing his first single "Blake" during that time. In 2022, he opened for rapper Matt Ox. In November 2025, he released an EP For Those with Eyes to See via Pizzaslime Records (his long-time netlabel). Ortiz-Goldberg has built a reputation for "inventive and unconventional" live shows such as performing in an outdoor dining hut and closing a poetry reading at New York's KGB Bar. He co-manages and often collaborates with the NYC synth-pop duo Frost Children. In 2026, he released the single "I Want More Money" (feat. Chloe Cherry). This was followed by the release of his debut album City of Careless Angels, which was rated a 6.6 out of 10 by Pitchfork.

Paper magazine described Blaketheman1000's music as a playful, "rap-meets-electro-pop" blend with "campy lyricism and light-hearted synths". Ortiz-Goldberg himself notes that his genre is "a combination of everything I’ve been into: EDM, indie, emo, hip-hop, country and top 40".

In 2022, Blaketheman1000 starred in Alyssa Davis Gallery's production of NAFTA: Miami as part of *Merde!* Gala, an adaptation of David Mamet's *Glengarry Glenn Ross* based in the New York City art world written by Victoria Campbell and Micaela Carolan.

== Discography ==
=== Albums ===
Title	Album details
City of Careless Angels	Released: 2026; Label: Self-released; Format: Digital download, streaming

=== EPs ===
Title	EP details
Tokyo	Released: 2017; Label: Self-released; Format: Digital download, streaming
For Those With Eyes to See	Released: 2025; Label: Self-released; Format: Digital download, streaming
It Could Be Nice	Released: 2025; Label: Self-released; Format: Digital download, streaming

=== Singles ===
Title	Single details
Taco Bell	Released: 2014; Label: Self-released; Format: Digital download, streaming
☆ S T E V I E ☆ W O N D E R ☆ [remixes]	Released: 2015; Label: Self-released; Format: Digital download, streaming
Blake	Released: 2015; Label: Self-released; Format: Digital download, streaming
$20 Lunch	Released: 2016; Label: Self-released; Format: Digital download, streaming
Library Love Song	Released: 2018; Label: Self-released; Format: Digital download, streaming
Ibuprofen	Released: 2020; Label: Self-released; Format: Digital download, streaming
Where’s My Hug?	Released: 2021; Label: Self-released; Format: Digital download, streaming
Where's My Frost Children?	Released: 2021; Label: Self-released; Format: Digital download, streaming
Pixies	Released: 2021; Label: Self-released; Format: Digital download, streaming
Goth	Released: 2021; Label: Self-released; Format: Digital download, streaming
Blake 2	Released: 2022; Label: Self-released; Format: Digital download, streaming
Dean Kissick	Released: 2022; Label: Self-released; Format: Digital download, streaming
Traffic	Released: 2022; Label: Self-released; Format: Digital download, streaming
Magician	Released: 2023; Label: Self-released; Format: Digital download, streaming
Float On	Released: 2023; Collaborators: Blaketheman1000, Frost Children & genny!; Label: Self-released; Format: Digital download, streaming
Citibike	Released: 2024; Label: Self-released; Format: Digital download, streaming
I Want More Money	Released: 2024; Collaborators: Blaketheman1000 & Chloe Cherry; Label: Self-released; Format: Digital download, streaming
