= Tweaker Poem =

EP by Frost Children
- Released: July 10, 2026
- Recorded: January 2, 2026
- Genres: Hardstyle; electropop; hyperpop; trance
- Length: 20:59
- Label: RCA
- Producer: Frost Children

Frost Children chronology
Sister (Remixed) (2026)	Tweaker Poem (2026)

Singles from Tweaker Poem
- 1. "Satellites" Released: June 23, 2026

Tweaker Poem is the sixth EP by American pop duo Frost Children. It was released on July 10, 2026, as their first release under RCA Records.

== Background ==
The EP’s main themes and its title come from an incident that occurred in 2025, where a stalker tried to follow them around New York City. The record was made in a single overnight session after the duo fled to Tokyo.

Tweaker Poem is centered around the concept of the “tweaker”, described by band member Angel Prost as an "obsessive, laser-focused lover weirdo [who] deserves to laugh and cry and have anthems too". The tracks are sequenced in the order of their creation.

The lead single "Satellites" was released on June 23, 2026, accompanied by a music video directed by Lotus Blossom.

A music video for "Creep" was premiered on July 10, 2026, following the EP’s full release, directed by Andrea Mauri.

== Reception ==
Tweaker Poem received generally positive reception from critics.

Melodic Magazine called "Satellites" "the prime example of such organised chaos" and said "the track kicks off Tweaker Poem with a more aggressive tone with straight-up hardstyle beats". WMSC said the song "sets the tone immediately" and that "the track sounds like it came straight out of a Dance Dance Revolution machine, all rapid-fire energy and bright arcade lights". Stereogum described the lead single as having "that arching, heart-on-sleeve quality that animates so many Frost Children songs, that sense of ultra-earnest emo and ultra-processed club music colliding under a gleaming pop facade".

"Creep" was described as "the catchiest track on the EP" by Melodic Magazine. WMSC called it "classic melodic and upbeat Frost Children with sparkling clean production". Playy Magazine called Creep "the project’s defining moment", "built around chopped house-style vocal samples before exploding into an anthemic chorus, […] a perfect example of Frost Children’s ability to transform sensory overload into irresistible pop songwriting."

"Afterlife" was described by WMSC as "hyperpop colliding with 2017 Goth Boy Clique era trap" and called it "one of the most interesting moments on the project".

Playy Magazine described "Gutted" as "one of the EP’s most emotional peaks, allowing brief moments of piano-driven calm to emerge before another explosive release".

Melodic Magazine said "Light Leak" and "Faster" delivered "some good ol' autotunes and feral trance drops". WMSC called Light Leak "electropop anchored by an absolutely insane synth melody that serves as the hook itself, landing somewhere between Frost Children and the 2014-era Chainsmokers". The track was also described by Playy Magazine as "provid[ing] the record’s dreamiest textures, wrapping bittersweet melodies in glowing Eurodance-inspired production".According to WMSC, Faster "ends things exactly where they should end: on the dance floor".Playy Magazine described the closer as "breathless, loud, and completely committed to excess".

WMSC said of the project "Tweaker Poem is chaotic, hyper specific, and deeply weird in the way only Frost Children can be. For a project born out of genuine fear and isolation, it is remarkable how much fun it is. These are, as the duo puts it, hymns for lovers who hypnotize themselves with faith when the world seems to frown at them. Somehow, they made that sound like a party". WhyNow Magazine described the EP as "one of the most emotionally charged releases of the year".

== Track listing ==
All tracks are written, produced, mixed, and mastered by Frost Children (Angel Prost and Lulu Prost); "Faster" written with Isaac Eiger.

Tweaker Poem track listing
No.	Title	Length
1.	"Satellites"	3:31
2.	"Creep"	4:00
3.	"Afterlife"	2:49
4.	"Gutted"	3:26
5.	"Light Leak"	3:35
6.	"Faster"	3:36
Total length:		20:59
