= Blood Barn =

American slasher film by Gabriel Bernini

- Screambox release poster
- Directed by: Gabriel Bernini
- Written by: Gabriel Bernini; Alexandra Jade
- Produced by: Gabriel Bernini; Juliet Bernini; Andrew Gibson; Alexandra Jade
- Starring: Chloe Cherry; Lena Redford; Andrea Bambina; Simon Paris; Samuel Lanier; Felipe di Poi; Pierce Campion
- Cinematography: Benjamin Bradley-Gilbert
- Edited by: Gabriel Bernini
- Music by: Jonathan Rado
- Production company: Gold Standard Productions
- Distributed by: Cineverse
- Release date: October 17, 2025
- Running time: 76 minutes
- Country: United States
- Language: English

Blood Barn is a 2025 American comedy horror slasher film directed and co-written by Gabriel Bernini. The film stars Chloe Cherry as one of a group of camp counselors who go to a cabin in the woods on summer vacation, only to find themselves victims of a supernatural evil.

Blood Barn screened at Nightmares Film Festival in October 2025. It has since been acquired by Cineverse, to begin streaming on Screambox in February 2026.

== Cast ==
- Chloe Cherry as Rachel
- Lena Redford as Josie
- Andrea Bambina as Amanda
- Simon Paris as Simon
- Samuel Lanier as Eric
- Felipe di Poi as Paul
- Pierce Campion as Scott
