= I Love You Jennifer B =

Studio album by Jockstrap
- Released: 9 September 2022
- Recorded: England
- Genre: Art pop
- Length: 44:11
- Label: Rough Trade
- Producer: Taylor Skye

Jockstrap chronology
Beavercore (2020)	I Love You Jennifer B (2022)	I<3UQTINVU (2023)

Singles from I Love You Jennifer B
- 1. "50/50" Released: 17 November 2021; 2. "Concrete Over Water" Released: 11 April 2022; 3. "Glasgow" Released: 14 June 2022; 4. "Greatest Hits" Released: 8 November 2022

I Love You Jennifer B is the debut studio album by British experimental pop band Jockstrap. It was released through Rough Trade Records in September 2022 and received critical acclaim. It debuted and peaked at number 57 in the UK Albums Chart. The album was shortlisted for the 2023 Mercury Prize.

A remix album, I<3UQTINVU, was released on 3 November 2023.

== Recording ==
On 14 June 2022, Jockstrap announced their debut LP titled I Love You Jennifer B along with the release of the album's third single "Glasgow". In a statement, Taylor Skye stated that "Glasgow" is the band's "coming of age, moving forward, long-distance, traveling, beautiful bosk, wonderful thicket song." According to the band, the album consists of a "collection of Jockstrap tracks that have been three years in the making. Everything on it is pretty singular sounding so we hope there is a track on there for everyone and something that speaks to you and says 'I'm a banger'."

== Critical reception ==
Professional ratings
Aggregate scores
Source	Rating
AnyDecentMusic?	8.4/10
Metacritic	89/100
Review scores
Source	Rating
AllMusic	4.5/5 stars
Clash	9/10
DIY	4.5/5 stars
Loud and Quiet	10/10
MusicOMH	5/5 stars
NME	5/5 stars
Pitchfork	8.4/10
PopMatters	9/10
The Skinny	5/5 stars
Slant Magazine	4/5 stars

According to the review aggregator Metacritic, I Love You Jennifer B received "universal acclaim" based on a weighted average score of 89 out of 100 from 15 critic scores.

Year-end lists
Publication	List	Rank	Ref.
Clash	Clash's Albums of The Year	3	
DIY	DIY's Albums of 2022	1	
Gigwise	Gigwise's 51 Best Albums of 2022	23	
The Line of Best Fit	The 50 Best Albums of 2022	6	
NME	The 50 Best Albums of 2022	14	
Paste	The 50 Best Albums of 2022	33	
Pitchfork	The 50 Best Albums of 2022	15	
The Skinny	The Skinny's Top Ten Albums of 2022	7	
Slant Magazine	The 50 Best Albums of 2022	27	
Under the Radar	The 100 Best Albums of 2022	30	

== Track listing ==
All lyrics are written by Georgia Ellery; all music is composed by Jockstrap (Ellery and Taylor Skye).

I Love You Jennifer B track listing
No.	Title	Length
1.	"Neon"	3:45
2.	"Jennifer B"	4:19
3.	"Greatest Hits"	4:27
4.	"What's It All About?"	2:44
5.	"Concrete Over Water"	6:09
6.	"Angst"	3:01
7.	"Debra"	4:54
8.	"Glasgow"	5:34
9.	"Lancaster Court"	4:12
10.	"50/50" (Extended Mix)	5:03
Total length:		44:11

== Personnel ==
Jockstrap

- Georgia Ellery
- Taylor Skye

Other performers

- Victoria Farrell-Reed, Nina Lim, Ivelina Ivanova, Gwyneth Helmes, Annie-May Page, Camille Saïd, Ella Fox, William Clark, Dom Ingham, Zoe Hodi, Nazli Erdogan, Johanna Burnheart, Freya Hicks, Isobel Doncaster, Sally Belcher, Felix Stephens, Evie Coplan, Jonah Spindel – strings
- Angus Webster – conductor

== Charts ==
Chart performance for I Love You Jennifer B
Chart (2022)	Peak position
Scottish Albums (Official Charts)	15
UK Albums (Official Charts)	57
UK Independent Albums (Official Charts)	3
