= Cheerleader (Porter Robinson song) =

Single by Porter Robinson

from the album Smile! :D
- Released: March 20, 2024
- Genre: Electropop; synth-pop
- Length: 3:57
- Label: Mom + Pop
- Songwriter: Porter Robinson
- Producer: Porter Robinson

Porter Robinson singles chronology
"Circle Game (ANOHANA Ver.)" (2023)	"Cheerleader" (2024)	"Knock Yourself Out XD" (2024)

Music video
- "Cheerleader" on YouTube

"Cheerleader" is a song recorded by the American electronic music producer Porter Robinson for his third studio album, Smile! :D (2024). An electropop and synth-pop song, its lyrics, written by Robinson, deal with parasocial relationships. "Cheerleader" was released on March 20, 2024, through Mom + Pop, as the lead single from Smile! :D. For his first solo release in two years, Robinson wanted to create something that people would enjoy "with zero context". It was accompanied by a music video where Robinson enters a virtual reality.

Multiple critics highlighted the contrast between the song's melody and lyrics, further noting its influence from emo. The song peaked at number 12 on Billboard's Dance/Electronic Songs.

== Background and composition ==
"Cheerleader" was Porter Robinson's first solo release in two years. It was one of the first songs that Robinson wrote for his new musical era. On writing the song, he said in a press release that he wanted to create something "that people could love with zero context – just instantaneous, universal, explosive connection". The lyrics depict the convoluted, parasocial relationship between musicians and their fans, one example being the line "She's got hearts in her eyes / Saying, 'Boy, you better watch the time / Cause if you're not mine I'd rather see you burned alive". The song features Robinson's own vocals, which Robin Murray of Clash described as "scintillating".

An electropop and synth-pop song, multiple critics noted the contrast between its melody and lyrics. Gillian Telling of People wrote that "Cheerleader" is "more of a pop anthem with emo undertones", contrasting with Robinson's previous works; Telling said Robinson was "reinventing his sound". Similarly, Cleber Facchi of Música Instantânea felt that the song shows Robinson having a "completely distinct approach" when compared to his previous releases due to its emo sound. Colin Joyce of Pitchfork said that the track resembled the emo pop of Metro Station and the post-hyperpop of Glaive and Aldn. Jason Lipshutz of Billboard described it as "a synth-pop shot of adrenaline, with buzzing melodies and instrumental pile-ups that will leave you dizzy", while Dan Harrison of Dork noted the song's "bouncy synths and earworm melodies". Robin Murray of Clash and Liberty Dunworth of NME described it as "explosive". Paul Simpson of AllMusic described the verses as resembling Phoenix's indie pop and the chorus as "soaring, anthemic [and] spiked with punchy breakbeats".

== Release and reception ==
"Cheerleader" was released on March 20, 2024, through Mom + Pop, as the lead single from Robinson's third studio album, Smile! :D. The song was accompanied by a music video directed by Hugh Mulhern and creative-directed by Bradley & Pablo, where Robinson enters a virtual reality. Harrison described "Cheerleader" as a highlight from the album due to its blend of depth and accessibility. Lipshutz praised that Robinson had created "the complete opposite of background noise". Matthew Kim of The Line of Best Fit wrote that the song "has the most euphoric hook of the year". Narzra Ahmed from Clash described it as "anthemic". The song peaked at number 12 on Billboard's Dance/Electronic Songs.

"Cheerleader" has been featured in several video games, including the soundtracks of EA Sports FC 25 (2024) and Forza Horizon 6 (2026). On May 1, 2025, "Cheerleader", alongside "Knock Yourself Out XD", was added to Dance Dance Revolution World. On June 8, 2026, a Hatsune Miku version of the song arranged by Jamie Paige was added to Hatsune Miku: Colorful Stage!. This rendition was later featured on the remix album Smile! :D Plus+.

=== Year-end lists ===
Year-end rankings of "Cheerleader"
Publication	List	Rank	Ref.
Pitchfork	The 100 Best Songs of 2024	95	

== Charts ==
Chart performance for "Cheerleader"
Chart (2024)	Peak position
US Hot Dance/Electronic Songs (Billboard)	12
