= Maho Rasop Festival =

Annual music festival in Bangkok, Thailand

- Genre: Indie rock; electronic
- Locations: Live Park Rama 9, Bangkok, Thailand (2018–2019); ESC Park, Rangsit, Thailand (2022–present)
- Years active: 2018–2019; 2022–present
- Organiser: HAVE YOU HEARD?; Seen Scene Space; Fungjai
- Website: mahorasop.com

Maho Rasop (Thai: มหรสพ) is an annual music festival held in Thailand. The first edition was held in 2018 at the Live Park Rama 9, Bangkok. The festival showcases independent local and international acts.

== History ==
The first edition of Maho Rasop Festival was held on 17 November 2018 at the Live Park Rama 9, Bangkok. It was headlined by The Vaccines and Slowdive. The festival was expanded into two-day event in 2019. It was held on 16 and 17 November and featured headliners King Gizzard & the Lizard Wizard, The Horrors, Bombay Bicycle Club, and The Drums. The festival was set to be held in 2020 but postponed due to the COVID-19 pandemic.

The festival made its return on 19 and 20 November 2022 after two-year hiatus at a new venue, ESC Park in Rangsit. It was headlined by Cornelius, DIIV, Mono, and Yussef Dayes. JX Soo of NME gave the 2022 event a perfect rating of five stars and called it "a breath of fresh air in an increasingly homogenous festival landscape". Music broadcaster Boiler Room made their Bangkok debut at the 2022 festival and curated the acts performing at the Rim Daeng Stage. The 2023 festival was held on 2 and 3 December and headlined by Idles and Interpol. The 2024 festival was held on 23 and 24 November and headlined by White Lies and Air.

== Festival line-ups by year ==
Headline performers are listed in boldface. Artists listed from latest to earliest set times.

=== 2018 ===
Maho-Ran Stage	Khao-Horm Stage	Serng-Swing Stage
**The Vaccines**; **Slowdive**; Washed Out; DEAN; Rad Museum; Miami Horror; Solitude Is Bliss	PREP; Lucie, Too; Wang Wen; Oddisee with Good Company; Sunflower Bean; Elephant Gym; Gym and Swim	Vacations; S.O.L.E.; Hariguem Zaboy; temp.; Yanin

=== 2019 ===
Maholan Stage	Khamram Stage	Yoklor Stage
Saturday, 16 November
**King Gizzard & the Lizard Wizard**; **The Horrors**; Phum Viphurit; No Party for Cao Dong; Stoic	The fin.; Lite; Tontrakul; Benny Sings; FOLK9; Supergoods	Pomrad; Onra (DJ set); Junoflo; Peachy!; Nuh Peace; Gulf of Meru
Sunday, 17 November
**Bombay Bicycle Club**; **The Drums**; BadBadNotGood; never young beach; Swim Deep	YOUNGOHM × YOUNG BONG; Deafheaven; Chai; Summer Salt; Say Sue Me; Khana Bierbood	Cosmo's Midnight; Bbno$; ¥ØU$UK€ ¥UK1MAT$U; Maft Sai; DCNXTR; Martian Child

=== 2022 ===
Maholan Stage	Silver Stage	Rim Daeng Stage
Saturday, 19 November
**Cornelius**; **DIIV**; Dry Cleaning; Moonchild; H 3 F	Desktop Error; Milli; A Place to Bury Strangers; Mild High Club; Fazerdaze; Alec Orachi	Srirajah Sound System; Wildealer; Foodman; Haru Nemuri; Buddha Beat; Vanthan
Sunday, 20 November
**Mono**; **Yussef Dayes**; Death of a Salesman; Se So Neon; Matt Maltese	Last Dinosaurs; Tokyo Shoegazer; Crack Cloud; DYGL; KIKI; Dogwhine	**Co-curated with Boiler Room**: Legowelt; DJ Dragon; Marmosets; rEmPiT g0dDe$$; Dott B2B Elaheh; Asa Moto; Chalo (Live); Pete TR; Thaistick

=== 2023 ===
Maholan Stage	Viman Stage	Sawan Club × Boiler Room
Saturday, 2 December
**Idles**; Caspian; Zweed n' Roll; Alex G; Yard Act; Ford Trio	Breakbot & Irfane (DJ set); Kamaal Williams; Otoboke Beaver; Mildlife; L8ching; Death of Heather	Young Marco; Club Mascot B2B Winkieb; Mae Happyair; Krit Morton; Jirus; GA-PI (Live); Plaur
Sunday, 3 December
**Interpol**; Alvvays; The Yers; Atarashii Gakko!; Squid; Numcha	Balming Tiger; Envy; Homeshake; Michael Kaneko; Soft Pine; D.B.Inches	Nuh Peace; Thaiboy Digital (Live); Osheyack (Live); Cinthie; Maft Sai; La Yumar

=== 2024 ===
Maholan Stage	Viman Stage	Sawan Club
Saturday, 23 November
**White Lies**; Paradise Bangkok Molam International Band; JPBS; Adoy; Ricewine; Yonlapa	Hippo Campus; Motorama; Venn; Grrrl Gang; Subsonic Eye; ผ้าอ้อม99999	Identified Patient; Ryota; Batu; Kova O'Sarin; Fatalism; Wuthichai
Sunday, 24 November
**Air**; Fazi; Real Estate; Ornaree; Hitsujibungaku; Bubble Tea and Cigarettes	Silica Gel; Shintaro Sakamoto; Automatic; John Carroll Kirby; Big Special; Lepyutin	Suburb Sound; Cashu; Surprise Chef; Flower.Far; Jitwam; Mad Madmen
