= Post-Pyramide =

Former postal service building in Hamburg, Germany

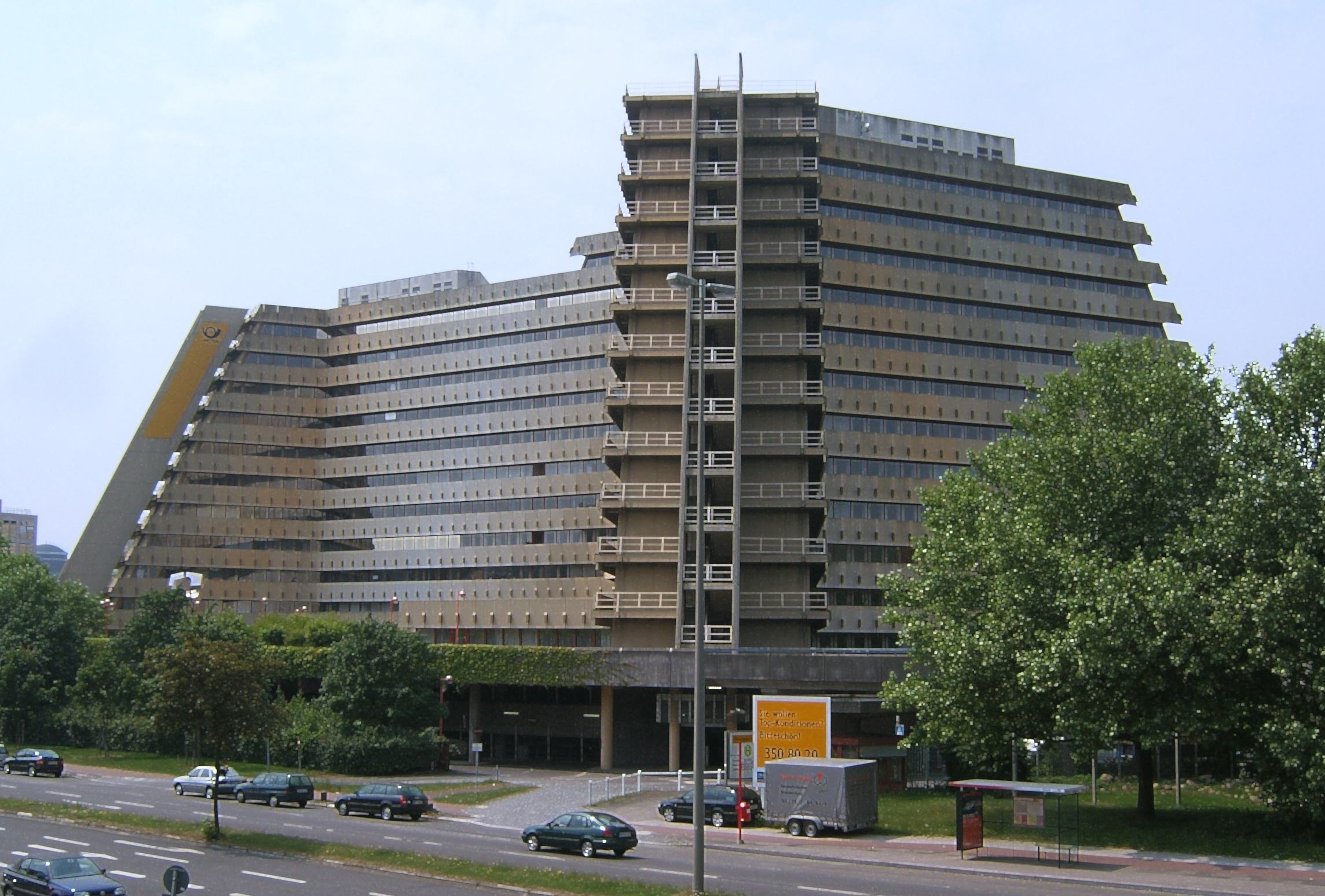
- Post-Pyramide in 2006
- Interactive map of the Post-Pyramide area

General information
- Coordinates: 53°36′15″N 10°00′58″E
- Year built: 1974–1977
- Opened: 1977
- Demolished: 2018

Design and construction
- Architects: Weber and Kuttinger

The Post-Pyramide, also known as the Oberpostdirektion ("Regional Postal Directorate"), was a postal service building in Hamburg, Germany. The building opened in 1977, and was surplus to Deutsche Post's requirements by the mid-2000s. Investors proposed various plans for redevelopment, but none were completed before the building's concrete had deteriorated to unsafe levels, and the building was demolished in 2018. The history of the building later received new interest when singer Kim Petras featured it as a metaphor in an album.

== History ==
The building was designed by Gerhard Weber and Georg Küttinger in 1974 and built with 3,600 prefabricated sandwich boards. It opened in 1977, where it was used by 1,400 postal workers hired by Hamburg Regional Postal Directorate, a subdivision of Deutsche Post. The Post-Pyramide was an example of brutalist architecture, a type popular in the 1960s and 1970s and featuring large amounts of concrete. The building was developed using poor quality concrete, and an expert report produced after a 2003 inspection recommended demolition.

Deutsche Post sold the building in 2005 as they no longer needed a building of its size, although some departments remained in the building. Over the next 12 years, the new investor developed plans to convert the building to a hotel, a fitness club chain expressed interest in the site, and plans were mooted to house refugees in the building, though none were fulfilled. The Post-Pyramide suffered a temporary forced eviction on fire safety grounds, and its final 150 employees left in December 2015, after which Germany's Federal Police used the building for training exercises. The building was sold in 2016, demolished in 2018, and replaced by apartment buildings developed by project developer Hamburg Team, Berlin-based real estate developer Christmann, and construction company Otto Wulff.

== In popular culture ==
Kim Petras, who had driven past the building during childhood trips to gender-affirming care appointments, released the song "Brutalist" as part of her May 2026 album Detour, which used the demolished building as a metaphor for loss and her transgender identity.
