= Wicked City (EP) =

EP by Jockstrap
- Released: 19 June 2020
- Genres: Electropop, experimental, art pop
- Length: 20:48
- Label: Warp

Jockstrap chronology
Love Is the Key to the City (2018)	Wicked City (2020)	Beavercore (2020)

Singles from Wicked City
- 1. "Acid" Released: 4 February 2020; 2. "The City" Released: 28 April 2020

Professional ratings
Aggregate scores
Source	Rating
Metacritic	80/100
Review scores
Source	Rating
AllMusic	3.5/5 stars
Beats Per Minute	81%
Clash	8/10
DIY	4.5/5 stars
Loud and Quiet	9/10
NME	4/5 stars

Wicked City is an EP by English duo Jockstrap. It was released on 19 June 2020 by Warp Records.

== Critical reception ==
Wicked City was met with "generally favourable" reviews from critics. At Metacritic, which assigns a weighted average rating out of 100 to reviews from mainstream publications, this release received an average score of 80, based on 6 reviews. Aggregator Album of the Year gave the album 81 out of 100 based on a critical consensus of 8 reviews.

== Track listing ==
Wicked City track listing
No.	Title	Length
1.	"Robert" (with Injury Reserve)	3:30
2.	"Acid"	3:50
3.	"Yellow in Green"	3:17
4.	"The City"	4:44
5.	"City Hell"	5:27
