= Sister (Frost Children album) =

Studio album by Frost Children
- Released: September 12, 2025
- Recorded: 2024–2025
- Length: 43:46
- Labels: True Panther; Dirty Hit
- Producer: Frost Children

Frost Children chronology
Hearth Room (2023)	Sister (2025)	Sister (Remixed) (2026)

Singles from Sister
- 1. "Control" Released: June 3, 2025; 2. "Falling" Released: July 1, 2025; 3. "What Is Forever For" Released: July 31, 2025; 4. "Bound2U" Released: August 27, 2025

Sister is the sixth studio album by American pop duo Frost Children. It was released on September 12, 2025, via True Panther Sounds and Dirty Hit in vinyl, CD, cassette and digital formats. It includes four singles released in mid-2025, including "Control", "Falling", "What Is Forever For", and "Bound2U". On April 8, 2026, a remix EP titled Sister (Remixed) was released.

== Background ==
Preceded by the duo's 2023 release, Hearth Room, the album consists of fourteen tracks ranging between two and four minutes each, excluding "2 Løve", whose runtime exceeds five minutes. It includes collaborators German singer-songwriter Kim Petras on "Radio" and English singer and producer Babymorocco on "Ralph Lauren".

"Control" was released as the album's lead single on June 3, 2025, alongside a music video directed by Ben Turok. The duo released "Falling" as the second single on July 1, 2025, with Lotus Blossom directing its music video. It was noted by Stereogum as a "sleazy, bombastic summer anthem," and the music video as "full of neon, chains, anime." On July 31, 2025, the third single, "What Is Forever For", was released with a music video directed by Angel Prost of the duo. It was followed by "Bound2U", the fourth single, on August 27, 2025.

== Reception ==
Professional ratings
Review scores
Source	Rating
Hot Press	7/10
Paste	6.5/10
Pitchfork	6.6/10
The Skinny	3/5 stars
Slant	3.5/5 stars

Edwin McFee of Hot Press gave the album a rating of seven out of ten, noting it as a "reaffirmation" that "Frost Children are one of the underground's hottest acts."

The album received a three-star rating from British publication the Skinny, whose reviewer Ian Macartney described it as sounding "less like an album, and more a playlist being blasted at some 2011 beach rave."

Writing for Slant, Steve Erickson assigned Sister a rating of 3.5 stars, referring to it as "the best synthesis of the duo's influences—from emo and pop-punk to indie sleaze—to date."

Andy Steiner of Paste compared Sister to its predecessor, suggesting it is a "softer" adaptation of Hearth Room. Rating it 6.5 out of ten, he also opined that the album is "another faithful recreation" of the 2010s era in which the popularity of electronic dance music peaked, and that it represents the band no longer "posturing as cooler-than-thou club kids."

== Track listing ==
All tracks are written by Angel Prost and Lulu Prost, with co-writers noted.

Sister track listing
No.	Title	Writer(s)	Length
1.	"Position Famous"		3:24
2.	"Falling"		3:47
3.	"Electric"		2:13
4.	"Control"		2:35
5.	"Bound2U"		2:56
6.	"What Is Forever For"	Isaac Eiger	3:04
7.	"Sister"	Avery Tucker	3:27
8.	"Dirty Girl"		3:10
9.	"Radio" (featuring Kim Petras)	Kim Petras	3:10
10.	"Don't Make Me Cry"	Porter Robinson; Nate Campany	3:39
11.	"Ralph Lauren" (featuring Babymorocco)	Clayton Pettet	2:38
12.	"Blue Eyes"		3:28
13.	"4Me"		2:18
14.	"2 Løve"		5:37
Total length:			43:46

All tracks are written by Frost Children.

Sister (Remixed) track listing
No.	Title	Length
1.	"Electric" (Olswel remix)	3:41
2.	"Falling" (Swedm® remix)	3:47
3.	"Control" (Saska remix)	2:29
4.	"What Is Forever For" (The Dare remix)	3:00
5.	"Sisters" (with Ninajirachi)	3:44
Total length:		16:41

=== Notes ===
- "Electric", "Control", "What Is Forever For", "Radio", "4Me", and "2 Løve" are stylized in all caps.
- "Dirty Girl" and "Don't Make Me Cry" are stylized in sentence case.

== Personnel ==
Credits adapted from Bandcamp.

=== Frost Children ===
- Angel Prost – performance, production, engineering, mixing
- Lulu Prost – performance, production, engineering, mixing

=== Additional contributors ===
- Porter Robinson – co-production on "Don't Make Me Cry"
- MØ – vocals on "2 Løve"
- Al Carlson – vocal mixing
- Connor Gilmore – mastering
- Eli Sheppard – cover photo
- Sasha Chaika – additional photo
- Gabi Cossens – packaging design
- Andrea Mauri – creative direction

== Charts ==
Chart performance for Sister
Chart (2025)	Peak position
UK Independent Albums (Official Charts)	48
UK Record Store (OCC)	20
