= Frost Children =

American hyperpop duo

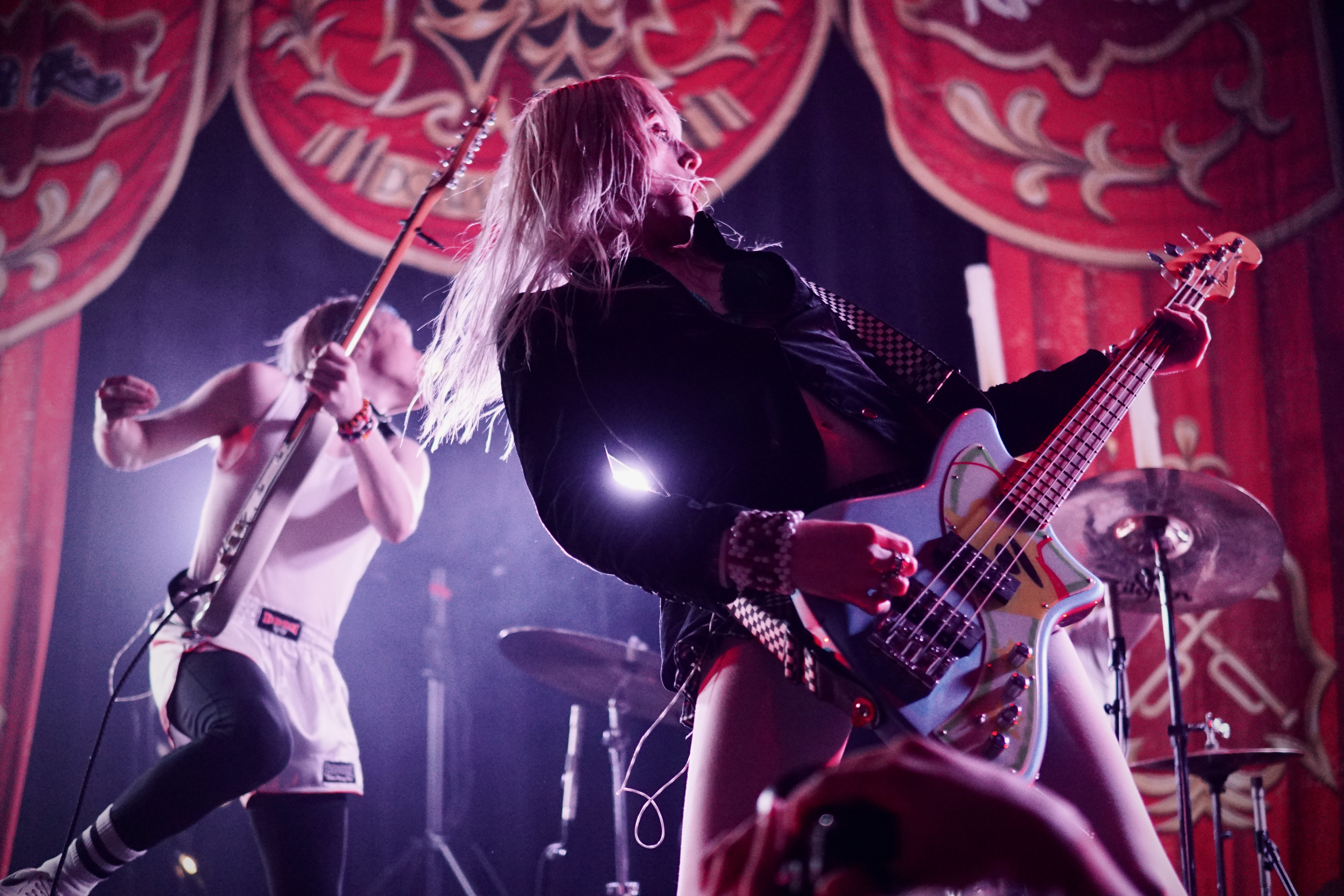
- Frost Children performing in 2024

Background information
- Origin: St. Louis, Missouri, U.S.
- Genres: Hyperpop; glitchcore; EDM
- Years active: 2019–present
- Labels: Flexible; True Panther; Dirty Hit
- Members: Angel Prost; Lulu Prost

Frost Children is an American pop duo from St. Louis, Missouri, now residing in New York City. The duo consists of siblings Angel and Lulu Prost.

== History ==
Angel Prost was born in Kentucky before moving to St. Louis when she was a year old. Right before she turned two, her sibling, Lulu Prost, was born. The family often performed at Sunday mass, with Angel and Lulu playing the bass and drums respectively. The pair became involved with a number of cover bands, particularly covering Green Day songs with their brother Brian. Lulu began a Beatles cover band known as the Termites, and Angel joined the band Permafrost and performed songs from the Scott Pilgrim vs. the World soundtrack.

Angel moved to the Bronx in New York in 2016 to study neuroscience, and Lulu studied at music school in Nashville. The duo formed Frost Children and began their career as a duo in 2019 remotely from each other, releasing a cover of Fall Out Boy's song "Yule Shoot Your Eye Out". In 2020, due to the COVID-19 pandemic, the duo quarantined in their home in St. Louis, and began making music together there. They released their first collection of songs, titled Aviation Creates Adventurous Beginnings, the same year.

In 2021, the duo both moved to New York after Lulu became disillusioned with music school. They released the album Elixir Rejection, which they have since referred to as "a product of early-pandemic collaboration."

Following the release of singles "Get What We Want" and "Mayfly", the latter of which featured musician Gary Wilson, the duo released their debut full-length album in 2022 titled Spiral. The album was recorded in upstate New York after Lulu returned from Nashville to work on the album in person. The band became popular in the creative scenes in downtown Manhattan and Brooklyn, particularly in the Dimes Square nightlife scene.

The duo released the single "Flatline" in January 2023, followed by singles "All I Got" and "Hi 5" in March. Following this, they released their second full-length album Speed Run on April 14 of the same year, featuring artists EXUM, May Rio, 8485, and Frost Children's manager Blaketheman1000. Lulu has referred to the project as a "the-pop-artist-big-ego-paparazzi" album and a "club record."

Speed Run was followed by a more analog-sounding companion project, Hearth Room, which Lulu described as an "ego-death-lifestyle-moved-upstate" album, released November 17, 2023 following its singles "Lethal" and "Stare At The Sun". Pitchfork described that Hearth Room's songs had a "gentler and sweeter sound" and followed "more conventional pop structures", comparing it to the work of Modest Mouse and Alex G. One catalyst for the album's sound was a head injury suffered by Angel at a club on Irving Avenue, as she only wanted to hear and make “lush, acoustic” music while recovering. The group embarked on a North American tour in 2024.

The duo was featured on the song "Mona Lisa" from Porter Robinson's third studio album Smile! :D in July 2024.

On August 15, 2024, the duo released the single "Shake It Like A", featuring Danny Brown. They released a new EP with Haru Nemuri titled Soul Kiss on October 4, having formed a friendship with Nemuri when they had performed at the same music festivals several years prior. Songs from the EP were created by way of the artists sending the files to each other online and testing the songs out at nightclubs in Berlin. The EP featured elements of hardcore punk and shoegaze.

On June 3, 2025, the duo released the single "Control" and announced their third album Sister via True Panther and Dirty Hit. Three more singles followed, those being "Falling" on July 1, "What is Forever for" on July 30, and "Bound2U" on August 27. Their third album Sister was released on September 12, alongside an accompanying music video for the track "Radio" featuring Kim Petras. Angel also featured prominently on several tracks of Brown's 2025 record Stardust, reading poetry, with Frost Children as a whole playing on the track "Green Light". In 2026, Frost Children were prominently featured as producers on Petras' album Detour.

Frost Children continued to release music and collaborate throughout 2026. In February, they performed a cover of My Chemical Romance's "Cancer" for the BBC Live Lounge and co-produced Kim Petras's single "Pop Sound".

On June 23, 2026, the duo announced the EP Tweaker Poem and released its lead single "Satellites", accompanied by a video directed by Lotus Blossom. The six-track EP was released through RCA Records on July 10, 2026, alongside a video for the track "Creep", directed by Andrea Mauri. Angel and Lulu Prost wrote and recorded the project in a single overnight session in Tokyo on January 2, 2026, after leaving New York in response to being stalked; its songs are sequenced in the order they were made, with a total running time of around twenty minutes. Angel described Tweaker Poem as an "ode to psychotic obsession" built around a possessive, fantasy-bound figure the duo call the "tweaker".

The duo maintained an extensive touring schedule in 2026, including a co-headline European run with Thaiboy Digital and appearances at festivals such as Electric Forest, Roskilde, Mad Cool, Lollapalooza, and Reading. They also held their annual Frost Fest event at the Knockdown Center in Queens, New York, on July 25, 2026.

== Production style and influences ==
Frost Children's style has been described as hyperpop and glitchcore, but often includes elements of synth pop, punk rock, electro punk, hardstyle, and screamo. They have been compared to the 2010s indie sleaze aesthetic, and take heavy influence from the internet and meme culture. The group has said their music is EDM or punk, but they generally reject the barriers of genre. Their lyrics contain themes of alienation and gender dysphoria.

In childhood, the pair became interested in emo music through watching YouTube on their father's desktop computer, including the bands The Fray and Say Anything. They have stated other early influences from genres such as EDM and dubstep, having listened to Deadmau5 and Skrillex together during their childhood, as well as shows from UKF Music and Ultra Music Festival. Later in life, Angel's influences included bedroom pop acts Alex G and Horse Jumper of Love.

== Community ==
Several publications have referred to the "tight-knit community" fostered by the group, particularly via Discord and Instagram, with i-D identifying the group's fans as being made up of "music nerds, fashion kids and the hyper-online." The Face described the band's audience during their 2024 tour, writing that "kids with furry tails, SpongeBob merch and Pokémon backpacks rave[d] besides silver-haired indie rockers in weather-appropriate beanies and down jackets."

== Discography ==
=== Albums ===
- Aviation Creates Adventurous Beginnings (2020)
- Elixir Rejection (2021)
- Spiral (2022)
- Speed Run (2023)
- Hearth Room (2023)
- Sister (2025)

=== EPs ===
- Speed Run (The Remixes) (2023)
- Frost Children Far Out (2024)
- VVROST (2024) (with SEBii)
- Soul Kiss (2024) (with Haru Nemuri)
- Sister (Remixed) (2026)
- Tweaker Poem (2026)

=== Singles ===
- "Yule Shoot Ur Eye Out" / "Scruge" (2019)
- "Osiris Adventure" (2020)
- "Sonic" (2020)
- "Insane (Deadscots and Gullivers)" (2020)
- "Safe" (2020)
- "Bl!nk" (2020)
- "Bouncehouse" (ft. Glitch Gum) (2021)
- "Pup" (2021)
- "Skype Me" (2021)
- "Mott St (In July)" (2021)
- "Goth" (2021) (Blaketheman1000 ft. Frost Children & Shallowhalo)
- "Get What We Want" (2022)
- "Mayfly" (ft. Gary Wilson) (2022)
- "Lake of Love" (2022)
- "Fox Bop" (2022)
- "Flatline" (2023)
- "All I Got" (2023)
- "Seeing Stars" (2023) (Neggy Gemmy ft. Frost Children)
- "Hi 5" (2023)
- "SXC" (2023) (Babymorocco ft. Frost Children)
- "Lethal" (2023)
- "Stare at the Sun" (2023)
- "Float On" (2023) (Blaketheman1000 ft. Frost Children & Genny)
- "SMSOU" (2024) (Eliminate ft. Frost Children)
- "We Invented Love" (2024) (Dorian Electra ft. Frost Children & altgrandma)
- "Mona Lisa" (2024) (Porter Robinson ft. Frost Children)
- "Shake It Like A" (ft. Danny Brown) (2024)
- "Daijoubu Desu (ft. Haru Nemuri)" (2024)
- "Bikinis and Trackies" (2024) (Babymorocco ft. Frost Children)
- "Elle Aime" (2024) (Babymorocco ft. Frost Children)
- "Control" (2025)
- "Falling" (2025)
- "What is Forever for" (2025)
- "Bound2U" (2025)
- "Sisters" (2026) (with Ninajirachi)
- "Satellites" (2026)

=== Remixes ===
- "Where's My Hug? (Frost Children Hugsick Loser Remix)" (2021) (Blaketheman1000)
- "Demolished (Frost Children Remix)" (2022) (Stranger Ranger)
- "Freak Mode (Frost Children Remix)" (2023) (Dorian Electra)
- "Flatline (Eliminate Remix)" (2023)
- "Hi 5 (Galen Tipton Remix)" (2023)
- "Let It Be (Parker Corey Remix)" (2023)
- "Even It Out (Frost Children Remix)" (2023) (Fever Ray)
- "American Terrorist (Frost Children Remix)" (2024) (Thoom)
- "Shake It Like A (Jane Remover Remix)" (2024)
- "Kick Back (Frost Children Remix)" (2025) (Kenshi Yonezu)
- "Fuck My Computer (Frost Children Remix)" (2025) (Ninajirachi)
- "Fire Away (Frost Children Remix)" (2026) (Madeon ft. Slayyyter)
- "The Peace (Frost Children Remix)" (2026) (Underscores)
- "Together (Frost Children Remix)" (2026) (The Avalanches ft. Nikki Nair, Jessy Lanza and Prentiss)
- "Is There Really No Happiness? (Frost Children Remix)" (2026) (Porter Robinson)
