= Chloe Cherry =

American actress (born 1997)

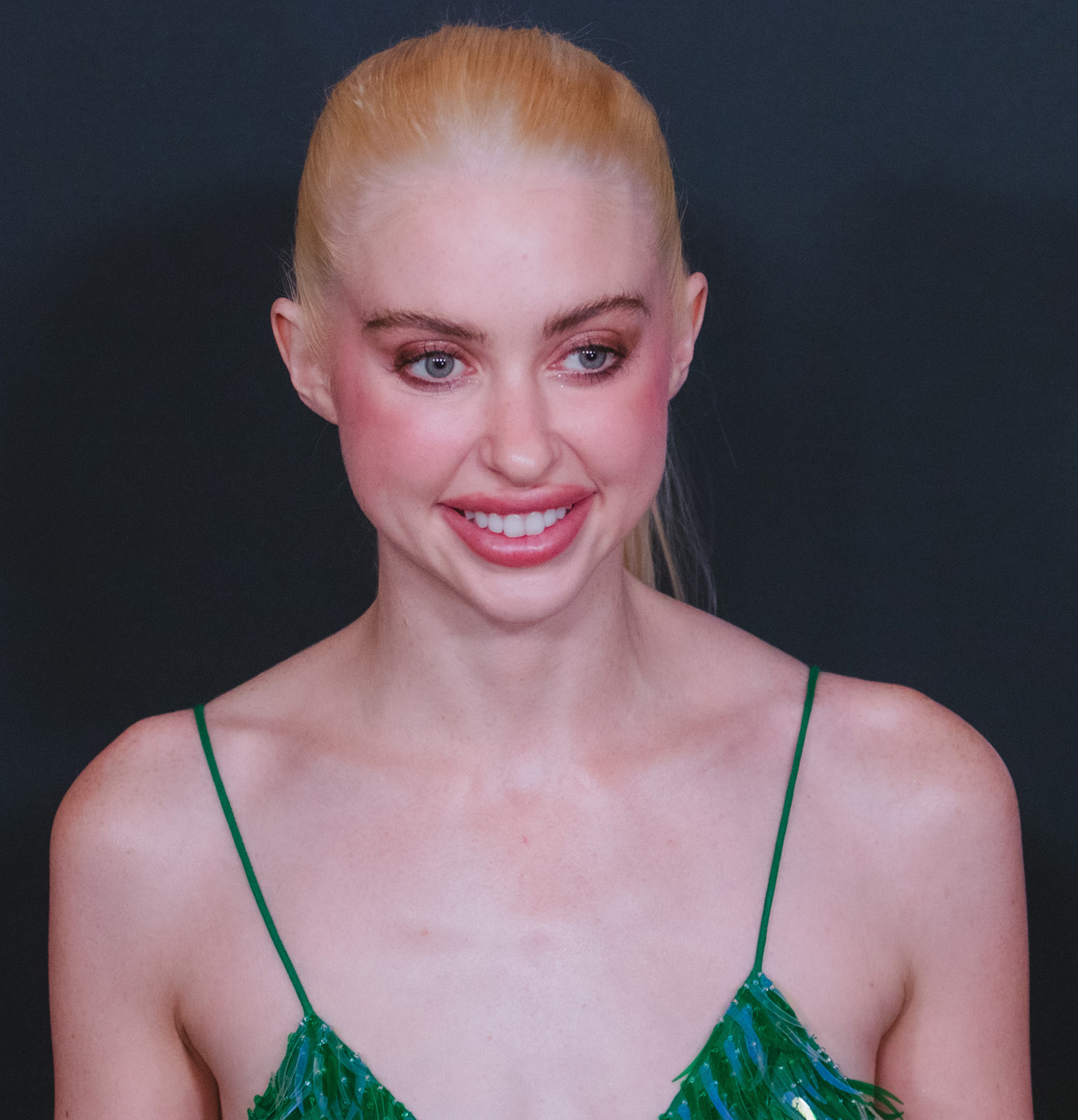
- Cherry in 2026
- Born: August 23, 1997 (age 29); Willow Street, Pennsylvania, U.S.
- Other name: Chloe Couture
- Occupations: Actress; model
- Years active: 2015–present
- Website: chloecherry.com

Chloe Cherry (born August 23, 1997) is an American actress. Born in Willow Street, Pennsylvania, she started her pornographic film career in 2015 and had filmed over 200 scenes by 2019. After opening an OnlyFans account during the COVID-19 pandemic in the United States and producing a Euphoria parody for the platform, she made her mainstream acting debut as that series' Faye Valentine and appeared on multiple podcasts and in multiple festival films and music videos. She released her debut single, "I Want More Money", in December 2024.

== Biography ==
Cherry was born on August 23, 1997 in Willow Street in Pennsylvania's Lancaster County, known as the Amish capital of the US. She has said that her childhood was "conservative and boring" and that her family was one of the few in her school that did not attend church. While in high school, she wrote for its yearbook, briefly managed a band, and read morning announcements, the last of which made her realise she wanted to be a performer. She has said that her high school grades were poor and that this may have been a consequence of her father dying of cancer when she was eight. In 2015, she was convicted of shoplifting while still a minor and moved to Miami to become a pornographic film actress days after turning 18, having decided that the latter was more viable than attending college. She then relocated to Los Angeles, signed with the agency Spiegler Girls, and changed her name from Chloe Couture to Chloe Cherry in 2017 after finding a mainstream actress called Chloe Couture.

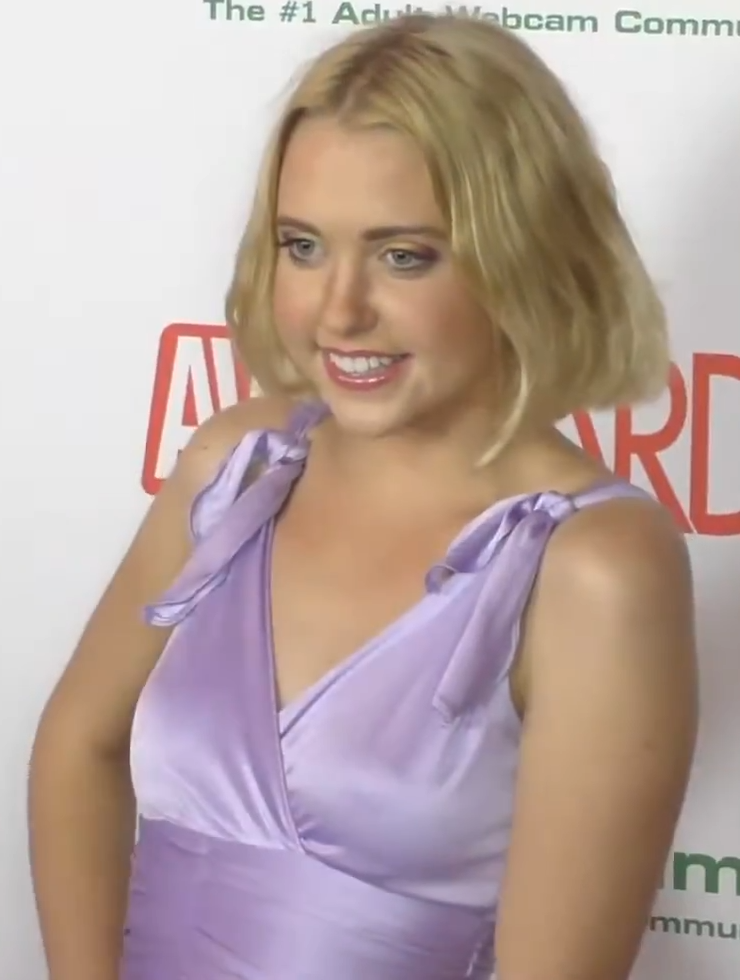
Cherry in 2017

By 2019, she had filmed over 200 pornographic films and received more than 120 million views on Pornhub. That year, she filmed a pornographic parody of the Black Mirror episode "Rachel, Jack and Ashley Too" called Pink Mirror and was scouted for HBO's Euphoria after series creator Sam Levinson saw one of Cherry's Instagram stories in which she filmed herself watching customers at a shopping mall. After the show halted production during the COVID-19 pandemic, she opened an OnlyFans account, which she has said made her more money than her porn career. Among the content made for the account was a 2020 pornographic parody of Euphoria in which Cherry and Jenna Foxx played the characters of Jules Vaughn and Rue Bennett.

In January 2022, Cherry began playing Faye Valentine in the second season of Euphoria. She continued to use her stage name for mainstream roles due to her online fame. She then signed on to appear in the thriller Maid to Kill and said that she entered the porn industry because she liked sex and that people should not have a problem with sex workers appearing in Euphoria. Scheduling conflicts meant that she was replaced in Maid to Kill by Lily Larimar. In February, she made her runway modeling debut for LaQuan Smith during New York Fashion Week and described news and social media reactions to her use of lip filler as "surreal". In an episode of Call Her Daddy broadcast the month after, she said that her stage name was inspired by one of the Bratz dolls, that she had recovered from an eating disorder she had developed after a former talent agent made a fatphobic comment about her, that the only part of her porn career she regretted was her high school friends rejecting her, and that she was "done" with the industry. She then said in April that she used to have multiple sugar daddies, that she had dated ten different people at once, and that her interest in sex had much to do with being taught about abstinence.

Cherry appeared in the music video for Bella Poarch's "Dolls" in July and was reported by Deadline Hollywood to appear in Eddie Huang's then-upcoming film Tuna Melt in August, with Substack staging a table read for the latter in July 2026. She also appeared in sketches on the satirical talk show Ziwe in November 2022. On an episode of Emily Ratajkowski's High Low podcast in January 2023, Cherry said she felt safer working in porn than she did working as a waitress, that she left porn because she did not want to be treated differently by other performers, and that she was single. After being charged $2,100 and given a year of probation in July for stealing a $28 blouse from Building Character in Lancaster in December 2022, she appeared in music videos for Dillon Francis' "LA On Acid" and Charli XCX's "360" in March and May 2024 and then the June films The French Italian and Www.RachelOrmont.com at the Tribeca Festival and San Francisco Jewish Film Festival respectively.

Cherry released her debut single "I Want More Money" with musician and producer Blaketheman1000 in December 2024, having come to his attention when she covered his song "Pixies" on TikTok. The following year, she appeared in Find Your Friends at the Fantasia International Film Festival in July, Two Neighbors at the Edinburgh Film Festival in August, The Napa Boys at the Toronto International Film Festival in September, and Blood Barn at the Nightmares Film Festival in October. In April 2026, she returned to Euphoria for its third season, appeared in Roommates, and said it was "crazy as fuck" to see the former's Cassie Howard turn to OnlyFans given her privileged life. That June, she announced her memoir Somewhere Dark and Hot and discussed it with Rolling Stone. The memoir was scheduled for publication in February 2027 by Simon & Schuster and named after the impression she had of Los Angeles before moving there.

== Filmography ==
=== Film ===
Year	Title	Role
2024	The French Italian	Mary
2024	www.RachelOrmont.com	Mommy 6.0
2025	Find Your Friends	Lola
2025	Two Neighbors	Stacy
2025	The Napa Boys	Kim
2025	Blood Barn	Rachel
2026	Roommates	Katie

=== Television ===
Year	Title	Role	Notes
2022–2026	Euphoria	Faye Valentine	Recurring role (season 2); main role (season 3)
2022	Ziwe	Sarah	Episode: "Miss Universe"

=== Music videos ===
Year	Title	Artist
2022	"Dolls"	Bella Poarch
2024	"LA On Acid"	Dillon Francis
2024	"360"	Charli XCX

== Discography ==
=== Singles ===
Singles as featured artist
Title	Year	Album	Ref.
"I Want More Money" (Blaketheman1000 & Chloe Cherry)	2024	Non-album single	

=== Featured singles ===
Singles as featured artist
Title	Year	Ref.
"Breathe" (Mitch EUPHORIA x Tina featuring Martha Kelly, Kadeem Hardison, Chloe Cherry, Anna Van Patten, Melvin 'Bonez' Estes, Toby Wallace & James Landry Hébert)	2026	

=== Other appearances ===
Title	Year	Album	Ref.
"Porn Star" (Viola Odette Harlow featuring Chloe Cherry)	2025	Porn Star	
"Bovvl Knowledge" (DJstarkiller featuring Chloe Cherry)	2026	Forbidden Fruits	
