= Jockstrap (band) =

Musical duo from London

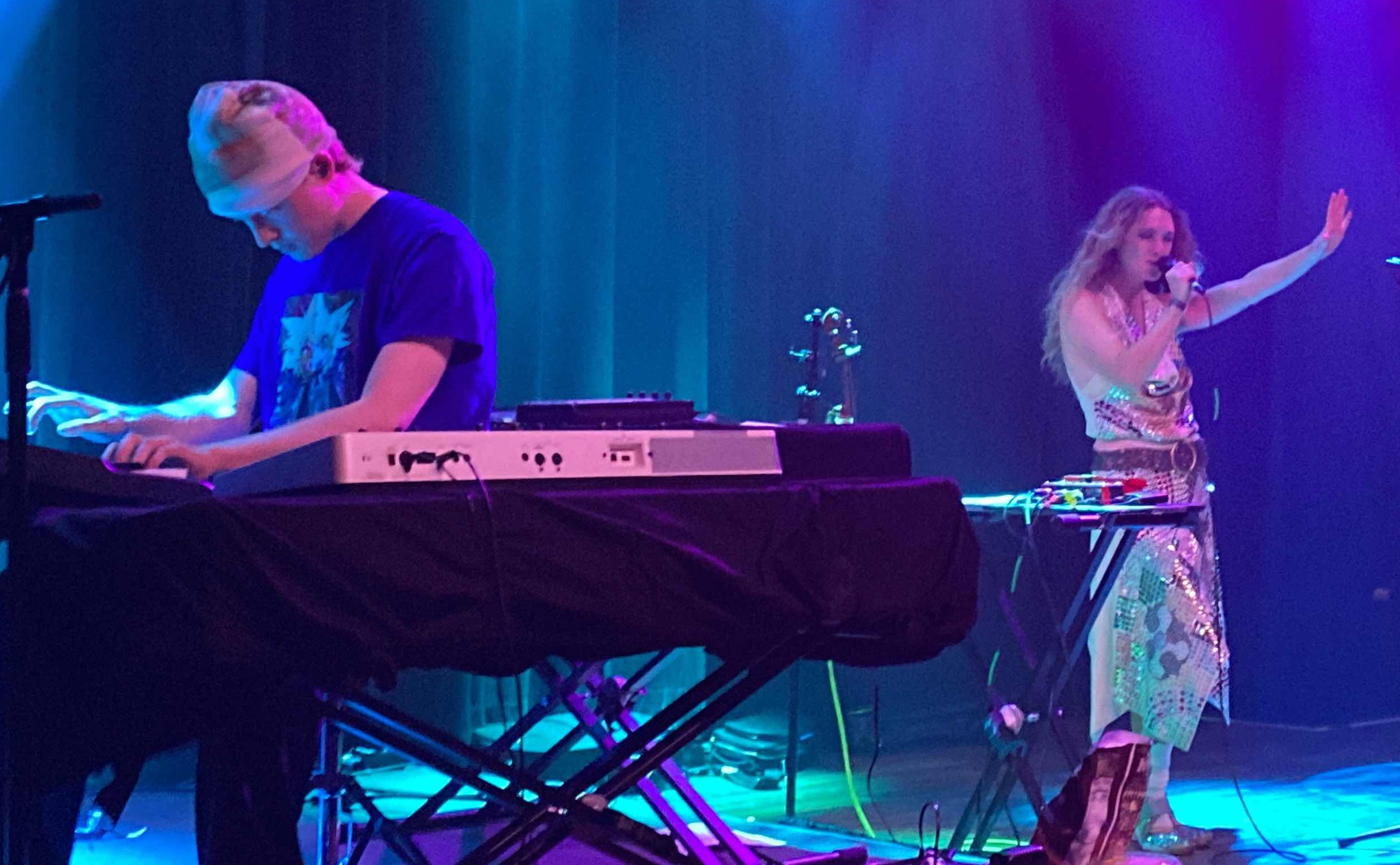
- Jockstrap performing in 2023

Background information
- Origin: London, England
- Genres: Experimental pop; art pop
- Years active: 2017–present
- Labels: Kaya Kaya; Warp; Rough Trade
- Members: Georgia Ellery; Taylor Skye

Jockstrap are an English musical duo consisting of Georgia Ellery and Taylor Skye, who met at London's Guildhall School of Music and Drama in 2016. The duo's music has been categorised by critics as experimental pop and art pop, combining Ellery's half-whispered vocals and string arrangements with Skye's electronic production.

The band signed to Rough Trade Records in 2021 and have so far put out three singles under the label, namely "50/50", "Concrete Over Water", and "Glasgow", and a debut studio album, I Love You Jennifer B, released on 9 September 2022. Upon its release, the album gained critical acclaim and was nominated for the 2023 Mercury Prize.

Taylor Skye additionally works as a producer, and has produced tracks with Slowthai, Injury Reserve, and Sega Bodega, among others. Georgia Ellery is also a member of Black Country, New Road.

== History ==
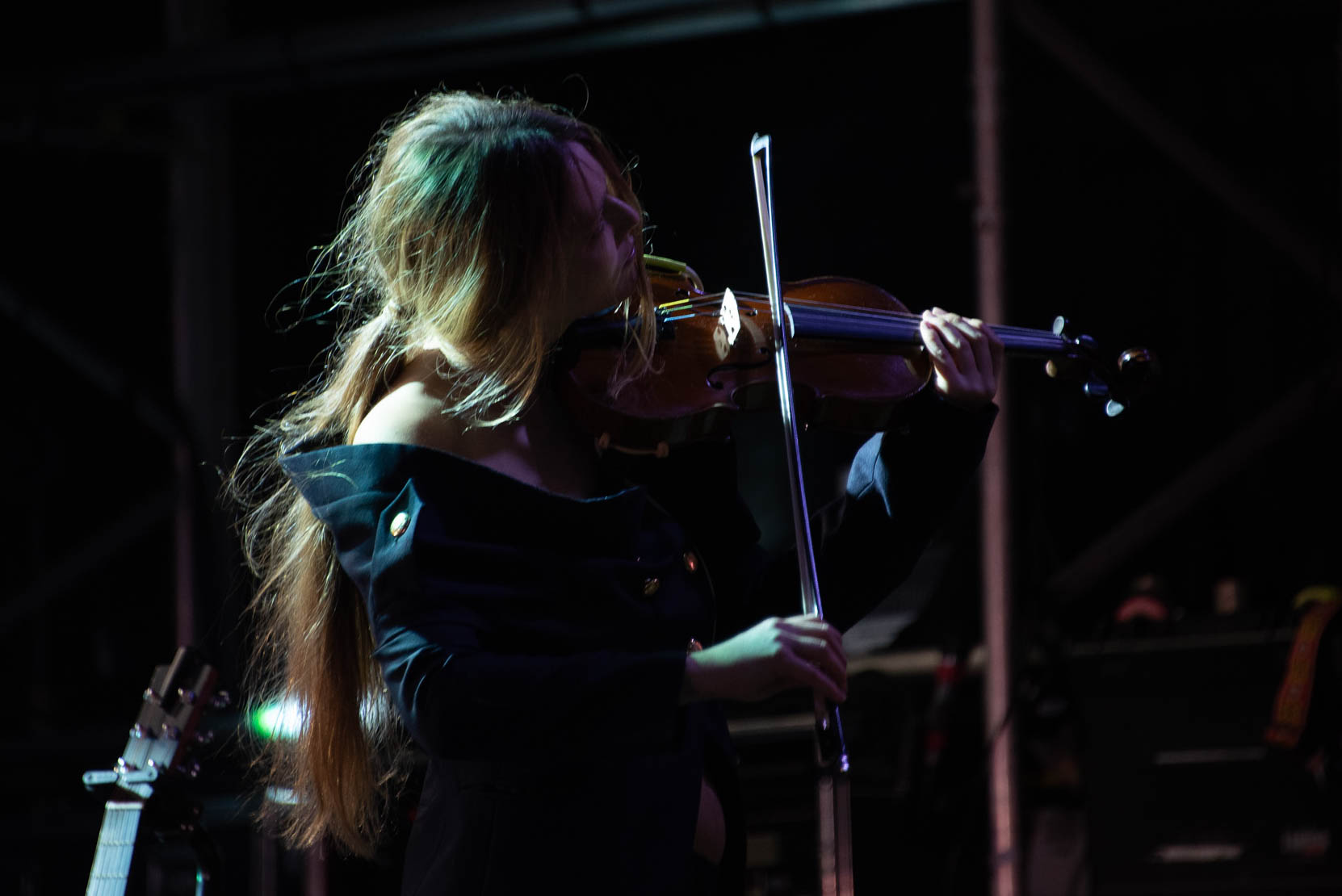
Georgia Ellery of Jockstrap performing at End of the Road, Dorset, England, 31st August 2024

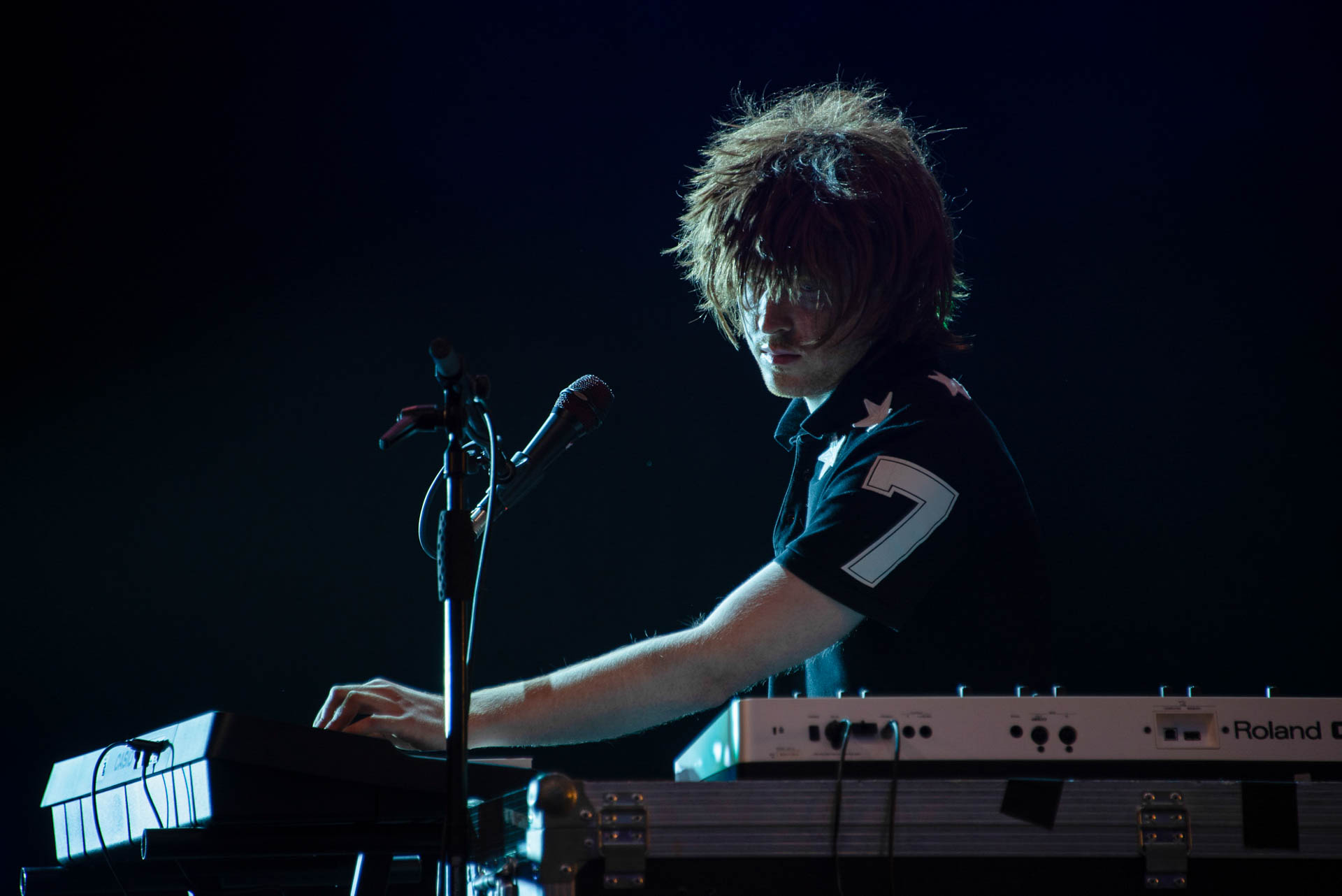
Taylor Skye of Jockstrap performing at End of the Road, Dorset, England, 31st August 2024

Georgia Ellery and Taylor Skye met while studying at the Guildhall School of Music and Drama in 2016 in London, where Ellery focused on jazz violin and Skye on electronic music. They began collaborating in September 2017, after Ellery approached Skye to produce a series of songs she had written. Their debut single, "I Want Another Affair", was released later that year, followed by their first live performance in March 2018.

The duo adopted the name "Jockstrap" for its shock value and memorability. On 2 November 2018, they released their debut EP, Love Is the Key to the City, through Kaya Kaya Records. The EP featured songs such as "Hayley" and "Charlotte", which were written as poems reflecting Ellery's experiences during her first year at Guildhall. The project incorporated a 21-piece string ensemble composed of fellow students. In April 2019, they released a visual remix EP, Lost My Key in the <3 Club <3, with remixed tracks by Skye and videos directed by Ellery.

In 2020, Jockstrap signed to Warp Records and released their second EP, Wicked City, on 19 June. The record expanded their sonic palette, with tracks like "Acid" and "Robert" introducing elements of electro-noise and experimental hip-hop. The latter track was a collaboration with the Arizona hip-hop group Injury Reserve, which they opened for on the group's UK and Ireland leg of their tour, having met at Iceland Airwaves in 2018. The duo later paid tribute to member Jordan Groggs following his death. Due to restrictions imposed by the COVID-19 pandemic in the United Kingdom, Jockstrap launched a virtual exhibition at implied.gallery in lieu of music videos for the EP. During the same period, Ellery collaborated with Jamie xx in a 15-minute improvised session for BBC Radio 3's ''Late Junction''.

In November 2021, Jockstrap signed with Rough Trade Records and released the singles "50/50", "Concrete Over Water", and "Glasgow". Their debut studio album, I Love You Jennifer B was released on 9 September 2022. The album received critical acclaim and was shortlisted for the 2023 Mercury Prize. The recording process was marked by a combination of accident and experimentation, with incidents such as a stolen laptop—reportedly recovered by Slowthai—shaping the final outcome. The duo toured extensively in support of the album, including their first North American performances.

A remix album of I Love You Jennifer B, called I<3UQTINVU, was released on 3 November 2023 with Skye leading the production.

== Members ==
- Georgia Ellery – vocals, violin, guitar
- Taylor Skye – production, synthesisers, keyboards, drum machines, programming, vocals

== Discography ==
=== Studio albums ===
- I Love You Jennifer B (2022, Rough Trade Records)

=== Remix albums ===
- I<3UQTINVU (2023, Rough Trade Records)

=== EPs ===
- Love Is the Key to the City (2018, Kaya Kaya Records)
- Lost My Key in the <3 Club <3 (2019, Kaya Kaya Records)
- Wicked City (2020, Warp Records)
- Beavercore (2020, Warp Records)

=== Singles ===
- "Hayley" (2018)
- "Charlotte" (2018)
- "Acid" (2020)
- "The City" (2020)
- "50/50" (2021)
- "Concrete Over Water" (2022)
- "Glasgow" (2022)
- "Greatest Hits" (2022)
- "Red Eye" (2023)
- "Good Girl" (2023)
