= List of accolades received by Under the Skin =

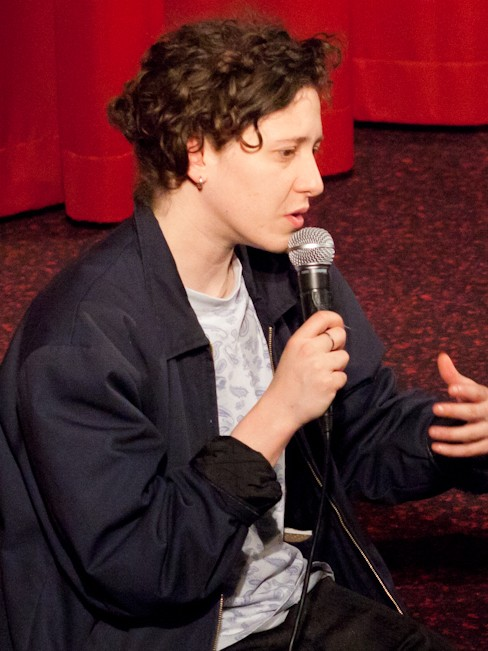
Mica Levi won numerous awards for their score, including the European Film Award for Best Composer.

Under the Skin is a 2013 science fiction film directed by Jonathan Glazer, and written by Glazer and Walter Campbell as a loose adaptation of Michel Faber's 2000 novel of the same name. It received praise from critics, particularly for Scarlett Johansson's performance, Glazer's directorial style, and Mica Levi's score. It was named one of the best films of 2014 and one of the best films of the decade by many critics and publications.

== Accolades ==
Award	Date of ceremony	Category	Recipient(s)	Result	Ref(s)
Alliance of Women Film Journalists	2014	Best Depiction of Nudity, Sexuality, or Seduction	Scarlett Johansson	Won	
American Society of Cinematographers Awards	15 February 2015	Spotlight Award	Daniel Landin	Nominated	
ASCAP Film and Television Music Awards	9 March 2015	Best Film Score	Mica Levi	Nominated	
BFI London Film Festival	2013	Best Film	Under the Skin	Nominated	
British Academy Film Awards	8 February 2015	Outstanding British Film	Under the Skin	Nominated	
British Academy Film Awards	8 February 2015	Best Original Music	Mica Levi	Nominated	
British Independent Film Awards	8 December 2013	Best Director	Jonathan Glazer	Nominated	
British Independent Film Awards	8 December 2013	Best Actress	Scarlett Johansson	Nominated	
British Independent Film Awards	8 December 2013	Best Technical Achievement	Johnnie Burn (sound design)	Nominated	
British Independent Film Awards	8 December 2013	Best Technical Achievement	Mica Levi (music)	Nominated	
Chicago Film Critics Association	15 December 2014	Best Film	Under the Skin	Nominated	
Chicago Film Critics Association	15 December 2014	Best Actress	Scarlett Johansson	Nominated	
Chicago Film Critics Association	15 December 2014	Best Adapted Screenplay	Jonathan Glazer; Walter Campbell	Nominated	
Chicago Film Critics Association	15 December 2014	Best Original Score	Mica Levi	Won	
Cinema Eye Honors	2015	Heterodex Award	Under the Skin	Nominated	
Critics' Choice Awards	15 January 2015	Best Sci-Fi/Horror Movie	Under the Skin	Nominated	
Detroit Film Critics Society	2015	Best Film	Under the Skin	Nominated	
Detroit Film Critics Society	2015	Best Director	Jonathan Glazer	Nominated	
Detroit Film Critics Society	2015	Best Actress	Scarlett Johansson	Nominated	
Dorian Awards	2015	Visually Striking Film of the Year	Under the Skin	Nominated	
Dublin Film Critics' Circle	2014	Best Film	Under the Skin	Runner-up	
Dublin Film Critics' Circle	2014	Best Director	Jonathan Glazer	Runner-up	
Dublin Film Critics' Circle	2014	Best Actress	Scarlett Johansson	Runner-up	
Empire Awards	29 March 2015	Best Horror Film	Under the Skin	Nominated	
Empire Awards	29 March 2015	Best British Film	Under the Skin	Nominated	
European Film Awards	13 December 2014	Best Composer	Mica Levi	Won	
Fangoria Chainsaw Awards	2015	Best Limited-Release/Direct-to-Video Film	Under the Skin	Runner-up	
Fangoria Chainsaw Awards	2015	Best Actress	Scarlett Johansson	Runner-up	
Fangoria Chainsaw Awards	2015	Best Score	Mica Levi	Won	
Independent Spirit Awards	21 February 2015	Best International Film	Under the Skin	Nominated	
Florida Film Critics Circle	19 December 2014	Best Score	Mica Levi	Won	
Golden Schmoe Awards	2015	Trippiest Movie of the Year	Under the Skin	Won	
Golden Schmoe Awards	2015	Best Actress of the Year	Scarlett Johansson	Runner-up	
Golden Schmoe Awards	2015	Most Memorable Scene in a Movie	Under the Skin	Nominated	
Gotham Independent Film Awards	1 December 2014	Best Feature	Under the Skin	Nominated	
Gotham Independent Film Awards	1 December 2014	Best Actress	Scarlett Johansson	Nominated	
Indiewire Film Critics' Poll	15 December 2014	Best Film	Under the Skin	Runner-up	
Indiewire Film Critics' Poll	15 December 2014	Best Director	Jonathan Glazer	Nominated	
Indiewire Film Critics' Poll	15 December 2014	Best Lead Actress	Scarlett Johansson	Runner-up	
Indiewire Film Critics' Poll	15 December 2014	Best Original Score or Soundtrack	Mica Levi	Won	
Indiewire Film Critics' Poll	15 December 2014	Best Cinematography	Daniel Landin	Nominated	
International Film Music Critics Association Awards	2015	Breakthrough Composer of the Year	Mica Levi	Won	
Jameson Dublin International Film Festival	2014	Best Cinematography	Daniel Landin	Won	
Kermode Awards	2015	Best Original Score	Mica Levi	Won	
London Film Critics Circle Awards	18 January 2015	Film of the Year	Under the Skin	Nominated	
London Film Critics Circle Awards	18 January 2015	British Film of the Year	Under the Skin	Won	
London Film Critics Circle Awards	18 January 2015	Actress of the Year	Scarlett Johansson	Nominated	
London Film Critics Circle Awards	18 January 2015	Director of the Year	Jonathan Glazer	Nominated	
London Film Critics Circle Awards	18 January 2015	Technical Achievement	Mica Levi (score)	Won	
Los Angeles Film Critics Association	7 December 2014	Best Original Score	Mica Levi	Won	
National Society of Film Critics	3 January 2015	Best Actress	Scarlett Johansson	3rd place	
New York Film Critics Online Awards	7 December 2014	Top Ten Pictures	Under the Skin	Won	
Online Film Critics Society	15 December 2014	Best Picture	Under the Skin	Nominated	
Online Film Critics Society	15 December 2014	Best Director	Jonathan Glazer	Nominated	
Online Film Critics Society	15 December 2014	Best Adapted Screenplay	Jonathan Glazer; Walter Campbell	Nominated	
Online Film Critics Society	15 December 2014	Best Cinematography	Daniel Landin	Nominated	
San Francisco Film Critics Circle	14 December 2014	Best Film	Under the Skin	Nominated	
San Francisco Film Critics Circle	14 December 2014	Best Director	Jonathan Glazer	Nominated	
San Francisco Film Critics Circle	14 December 2014	Best Actress	Scarlett Johansson	Nominated	
San Francisco Film Critics Circle	14 December 2014	Best Cinematography	Daniel Landin	Nominated	
San Francisco Film Critics Circle	14 December 2014	Best Editing	Paul Watts	Nominated	
South Bank Sky Arts Award	2015	Best Film	Under the Skin	Nominated	
St. Louis Gateway Film Critics Association	2014	Best Art Direction	Emer O'Sullivan; Martin McNee	Nominated	
St. Louis Gateway Film Critics Association	2014	Best Music Score	Mica Levi	Nominated	
Venice International Film Festival	28 August – 7 September 2013	Golden Lion	Under the Skin	Nominated	
Village Voice Film Poll	2014	Best Film	Under the Skin	Runner-up	
Village Voice Film Poll	2014	Best Actress	Scarlett Johansson	Runner-up	
Village Voice Film Poll	2014	Best Director	Jonathan Glazer	Runner-up	
Washington D.C. Area Film Critics Association	8 December 2014	Best Actress	Scarlett Johansson	Nominated	
Washington D.C. Area Film Critics Association	8 December 2014	Best Cinematography	Daniel Landin	Nominated	
Washington D.C. Area Film Critics Association	8 December 2014	Best Original Score	Mica Levi	Won	

== Legacy ==
Under the Skin appeared on numerous critics' and filmmakers' lists of the decade's best films:

- 1st – Little White Lies
- 1st – Robbie Collin, The Telegraph
- 1st – Tim Robey, The Telegraph
- 1st – Simon Abrams, RogerEbert.com
- 1st – Justine Smith, RogerEbert.com
- 1st – Susannah Gruder, Reverse Shot
- 1st – La Septième Obsession
- 2nd – Joshua Rothkopf, Time Out New York
- 2nd – IndieWire
- 2nd – Tara Brady and Donald Clarke, The Irish Times
- 2nd – Patrick Gamble, Kinoscope
- 2nd – Derek Smith, Slant Magazine
- 3rd – Geoff Berkshire, The Los Angeles Times
- 3rd – The Skinny
- 4th – Scott Tobias, The A.V. Club
- 4th – Noel Murray, The A.V. Club
- 4th – Matt Prigge
- 5th – Jessica Green, Film Comment
- 5th – Les Inrockuptibles
- 6th – Time Out
- 6th – Keith Phipps, The A.V. Club
- 6th – Paste
- 7th – RogerEbert.com
- 7th – HyperAllergic
- 7th – Consequence of Sound
- 8th – Eric Henderson, Slant Magazine
- 9th – Cahiers du Cinéma
- 9th – Charles Bramesco, The A.V. Club
- 10th – Justin Chang, The Los Angeles Times
- 10th – Slant Magazine
- 10th – Ty Burr, The Boston Globe
- 9th – The A.V. Club
- 11th – Film Comment
- 11th – Adam Kempenaar, Filmspotting
- 12th – Ashley Clark, Film Comment
- 14th – The International Cinephile Society
- 15th – João Pedro Rodrigues, Cahiers du Cinéma
- 15th – Jesse Hassenger, The A.V. Club
- 15th – Vulture
- 17th – Beatriz Loayza, The A.V. Club
- 18th – Brian Tallerico, RogerEbert.com
- 20th – Joanna Di Mattia, Seventh Row
- Unranked – Kleber Mendonça Filho, Cahiers du Cinéma
- Unranked – Alice Winocour, Cahiers du Cinéma
- Unranked – Monia Chokri, Cahiers du Cinéma
- Unranked – Olivier Père, Arte TV
