= Jackie (soundtrack) =

Jackie (Original Motion Picture Soundtrack)

Film score by Mica Levi
- Released: 2 December 2016
- Studios: Angel Recording Studios, London
- Genres: Film score; jazz; avant-garde; ambience
- Length: 34:03
- Label: Milan
- Producer: Mica Levi

Mica Levi chronology
Remain Calm (2015)	Jackie (2016)	Slow Dark Green Murky Waterfall (2018)

Jackie (Original Motion Picture Soundtrack) is the soundtrack to the 2016 film of the same name, released alongside the film on December 2, 2016, by Milan Records. The score is composed by Mica Levi in their second feature film score after Under the Skin (2013). It received nominations for Best Original Score at the 89th Academy Awards and Best Film Music at the 69th British Academy Film Awards, amongst numerous other accolades.

== Development ==
Pablo Larraín recruited Mica Levi to compose music after he loved their work on Under the Skin while watching at the 70th Venice International Film Festival. Their inspiration towards Jackie Kennedy helped them to write the "light-hearted music" that matched the film, but also had a sense of tragedy as well. Speaking to Fact Magazine, they recalled their experience on how the score indicates her life post Kennedy's assassination, saying:

"She's got the seriousness and the trauma of all the lives that she's lost — her kids, as well — and all of this is being brought up while she has to face all of the world. But she's also smashing back the drinks, smashing back the pills, because she's trying to keep level somehow."

Levi referenced the music of classical films from the 1970s to influence it in their score as well as John Coltrane and Morton Feldman's works. The scoring process was very quick, with "In terms of the first bits, it felt really quick, then there was a gap in the middle and then another bit afterward". Even before the post-production, Levi started sending music that matched appropriately to the character and the film and while editing, they got the piece to editor Sebastian to include in the final edit of the film. Hence, the soundtrack begins with a downward note as per Larraín's suggestion.

To reflect Jackie's character, they used glissandos in the score, as did in her studio album with Shapes, Chopped & Screwed (2011) and Under the Skin. Levi acknowledged that they were interested in this technique as it was like "something that happens if you slow [your playing] down, you get this glooping and distortion and morphing of [sound]" which they felt quite expressive and give the score an "extra frill" but also create a sonic palette reminiscent of the 1960s, the film's period which was set. The addition of glissandos could give it an "indulgent" and "soupy" texture.

The film's periodic setting also helped Levi to choose a "jazz band" kind of instruments, without saxophones or trumpets as they felt the music should be very "quaint". The score is performed by three bassists, eight violins, six violas, six cellos, two flutes, with one of them playing clarinet, percussion and vibraphone, tied together, to sound homogenous. They further doubled the flutes and spread harmonies, so that they cannot be played together and if being put in unison, does not sound professional, creating a sound which was "quite meaningful and innocent". They put the basses up and made it loud and course, overlaid with hard brass, wind and strings giving a "posh, rich sound". The score was written within four to five months, quite less than the duration they worked in Under the Skin.

== Reception ==
=== Critical response ===
Kevin Lozano of Pitchfork gave the score 7.5 out of 10, summarising "Levi's score concretizes and helps control the artistic experience of the film. In effect, the score may not supersede its filmic anchor, but is sure does make the entire endeavor more beautiful." Music critic Jonathan Broxton commented "Levi's steadfast refusal to even make herself aware of what her film's dramatic arc actually is renders her music entirely pointless". Adam Kivel of Consequence wrote "Mica Levy is a supremely talented storyteller, able to tap into the most subtle moments and reveal unknown layers." James Southall of Movie Wave gave four stars to the album, opining that it "makes the moments of subtle levity all the more effective".

Sam Mackay of The Quietus had indicated that the score has "everything to do with the off-modern freshness of her approach in a field dogged by generic bombast and minimalism-by-numbers". Heather Phares of AllMusic wrote "Levi's score is as powerful a presence as Jackie herself, and its creativity is more appropriate than more traditional music would have been." Lauren Murphy of The Irish Times called it as an "understated score" rating three out of five. Mark Kermode of The Guardian complimented Levi's score, saying "From the saddening glissando strings of the opening theme, with its falling invocations of death and discord, Levi provides the unifying emotional glue for Larraín's deliberately shattered film. There's a touch of Jonny Greenwood's deeply unsettling music for There Will Be Blood about the recurrent swooning motif that Levi deploys, while eerie silences echoing between strong but fragile chords poignantly recall Jackie's isolation. Elsewhere, the drums of war scratch at the edges of plaintive piano pieces, while jazzier sounds evoke the sunny 60s optimism that was shattered in the wake of the Dealey Plaza shooting."

=== Accolades ===
Award	Date of ceremony	Category	Recipient(s) and nominee(s)	Result	Ref.
Academy Awards	February 26, 2017	Best Original Score	Mica Levi	Nominated	
Austin Film Critics Association	December 28, 2016	Best Score	Mica Levi	Nominated	
Boston Society of Film Critics	December 11, 2016	Best Original Score	Mica Levi	Won	
British Academy Film Awards	February 12, 2017	Best Original Music	Mica Levi	Nominated	
Chicago Film Critics Association	December 15, 2016	Best Original Score	Mica Levi	Won	
Critics' Choice Awards	December 11, 2016	Best Score	Mica Levi	Nominated	
Dallas–Fort Worth Film Critics Association	December 13, 2016	Best Musical Score	Mica Levi	2nd Place	
Florida Film Critics Circle	December 23, 2016	Best Score	Jackie	Runner-up	
Hollywood Music in Media Awards	November 17, 2016	Best Original Score – Feature Film	Mica Levi	Nominated	
Houston Film Critics Society	January 6, 2017	Best Original Score	Mica Levi	Nominated	
IndieWire Critics Poll	December 19, 2016	Best Original Score or Soundtrack	Mica Levi	Won	
London Film Critics Circle	January 22, 2017	Technical Achievement	Mica Levi (music)	Nominated	
Los Angeles Film Critics Association	December 4, 2016	Best Music	Mica Levi	Runner-up	
San Diego Film Critics Society	December 12, 2016	Best Use of Music in a Film	Jackie	Runner-up (Note: Tied with La La Land)	
San Francisco Film Critics Circle	December 11, 2016	Best Original Score	Mica Levi	Won	
St. Louis Gateway Film Critics Association	December 18, 2016	Best Music/Score	Mica Levi	Runner-up	
Washington D.C. Area Film Critics Association	December 5, 2016	Best Score	Mica Levi	Nominated	

== Track listing ==
No.	Title	Length
1.	"Intro"	1:26
2.	"Children"	3:20
3.	"Car"	0:23
4.	"Tears"	0:53
5.	"Autopsy"	2:39
6.	"Empty White House"	2:58
7.	"Graveyard"	3:10
8.	"Lee Harvey Oswald"	1:58
9.	"Walk to the Capitol"	2:43
10.	"Vanity"	2:59
11.	"Decision Made"	0:33
12.	"Burial"	2:33
13.	"The End"	5:14
14.	"Credits"	3:14
Total length:		34:03
