= Shelley's on Zenn-La =

Studio album by Oliver Coates
- Released: 7 September 2018
- Length: 38:40
- Label: RVNG Intl.

Oliver Coates chronology
Upstepping (2016)	Shelley's on Zenn-La (2018)	Skins n Slime (2020)

Shelley's on Zenn-La is a studio album by English cellist Oliver Coates. It was released on 7 September 2018 through RVNG Intl. It received universal acclaim from critics.

== Background ==
Oliver Coates is an English cellist from London. After releasing Upstepping (2016), he got signed to RVNG Intl. Shelley's on Zenn-La is his third solo album. In between, he collaborated with Mica Levi on Remain Calm (2016), and with Laurie Tompkins on Ample Profanity (2018). The album imagines the defunct Stoke-on-Trent nightclub Shelley's Laserdome on a fictional planet called Zenn-La. It features contributions from Malibu, Chrysanthemum Bear, and Kathryn Williams.

The album was released on 7 September 2018 through RVNG Intl. Music videos were released for "Charlev", "A Church", and "Norrin Radd Dreaming".

== Critical reception ==
Professional ratings
Aggregate scores
Source	Rating
Metacritic	81/100
Review scores
Source	Rating
The 405	8.5/10
AllMusic	4/5 stars
Drowned in Sound	6/10
The Line of Best Fit	8/10
Loud and Quiet	8/10
MusicOMH	4/5 stars
Pitchfork	7.7/10
Resident Advisor	3.5/5
The Skinny	4/5 stars

According to the review aggregator Metacritic, Shelley's on Zenn-La received "universal acclaim" based on a weighted average score of 81 out of 100 from 11 critic scores.

Adam Badí Donoval of Bandcamp Daily stated, "With Shelley's, Coates abandons the vaporous ambience that typified his earlier work." He added, "Eschewing the avant-garde aesthetic, this album displays the producer's heart: ecstatic avant-pop blended with shades of IDM." Paul Simpson of AllMusic wrote, "More than just a worthy successor to Upstepping, Shelley's on Zenn-La reconfigures both modern classical and electronic dance music, producing a wholly original work which knows no boundaries." Aidan Daly of The Line of Best Fit described the album as "renewed proof of Coates' gift for flexing considerable technological and musical muscle without ever becoming alienating."

=== Accolades ===
Year-end lists for Shelley's on Zenn-La
Publication	List	Rank	Ref.
Loud and Quiet	The Loud and Quiet Best 40 Albums of 2018	10	
Mixmag	The Top 50 Albums of 2018	30	

== Track listing ==
Shelley's on Zenn-La track listing
No.	Title	Length
1.	"Faraday Monument"	2:40
2.	"A Church"	5:00
3.	"Lime"	1:34
4.	"Charlev"	8:27
5.	"Norrin Radd Dreaming"	5:28
6.	"Cello Renoise"	5:02
7.	"Prairie"	1:41
8.	"Perfect Apple with Silver Mark"	8:45
Total length:		38:40

Expanded edition bonus track
No.	Title	Length
9.	"Swollen Spiraling Face" (featuring Malibu)	3:13
Total length:		41:48

== Personnel ==
Credits adapted from liner notes.

- Oliver Coates
- Malibu – spoken word vocals (on "Norrin Radd Dreaming")
- Chrysanthemum Bear – all other vocals
- Kathryn Williams – flute (on "Perfect Apple with Silver Mark")
- Rafael Anton Irisarri – mastering
- Andreas Lubich – vinyl cut
- WWFG – design
