= Disobedience (soundtrack) =

Disobedience (Original Motion Picture Soundtrack)

Film score by Matthew Herbert
- Released: 27 April 2018
- Recorded: 2017
- Genre: Film score
- Length: 49:35
- Label: Varèse Sarabande
- Producer: Matthew Herbert

Matthew Herbert chronology
| A Fantastic Woman (2018) | Disobedience (2018) | Gloria Bell (2019) |

Disobedience (Original Motion Picture Soundtrack) is the film score to the 2018 film Disobedience directed by Sebastián Lelio starring Rachel McAdams and Rachel Weisz. The film score is written and composed by Matthew Herbert and released through Varèse Sarabande label on 27 April 2018.

== Background ==
Matthew Herbert was announced as the composer for Disobedience, in his second collaboration with Leilo for A Fantastic Woman (2017). Herbert and Leilo approached as a secretly-made science fiction film, with a story taking place in another planet where the inhabitants follow ritualized customs. This resulted in the music having an otherworldly tone. He noted that the sequence where the lead actors indulge in lovemaking in a hotel, he considered a musical piece for collision of two spaceships for that scene, which would have the similar impact in a science fiction film as well. The score was released under the Varèse Sarabande label on 27 April 2018.

== Reception ==
Richard Lawson of Vanity Fair wrote: "the most successful aspect of Disobedience is Matthew Herbert’s searching, at times sinister score. It brings to mind the way Mica Levi’s score for another Chilean director’s Toronto-premiering film, Pablo Larraín’s Jackie, suggested a dark interior force or spirit guiding and haunting the more placid imagery on screen. Herbert’s music gives Disobedience jolts of allure and mystery." Calling it "a very interesting musical score", Peter Bradshaw of The Guardian wrote: "its musing and almost playful woodwind figures cut against the expected sombreness and obvious melancholy to contribute to this sense of disorientation and subversion."

David Rooney of The Hollywood Reporter wrote: "Another distinctive score from British electronic composer Matthew Herbert, continuing his collaboration with Lelio after A Fantastic Woman, provides delicate enhancement to the contemplative mood. And strategic use of sung Hebrew prayers adds immeasurably to the story's sorrow and gravitas." Tomris Laffly of Time Out noted that "An ominous 'There Will Be Blood'–esque score by Matthew Herbert is out of place". Ed Gonzalez of Slant Magazine called it a "dazzling musique concrète-style score".

Anne Cohen of Refinery29 wrote: "Matthew Herbert's score helps underscore (pun definitely intended) that feeling of unease, as if every action could cause irreparable damage to a fragile status quo." Nick Hasted of The Arts Desk wrote: "Matthew Herbert's score is mostly unobtrusive, ranging from the sound of ancient, Hebrew horns when we enter a synagogue to subliminal orchestration." Geoffrey Macnab of The Independent wrote: "Matthew Herbert's music adds grace and melancholy to moments that might otherwise have verged on the banal."

== Track listing ==
| No. | Title | Length |
|---|---|---|
| 1. | "Beasts & Angels" | 3:03 |
| 2. | "En Route" | 1:33 |
| 3. | "Procession" | 1:37 |
| 4. | "At the Grave" | 1:30 |
| 5. | "Bakery" | 1:21 |
| 6. | "Wig Shop" | 1:20 |
| 7. | "Shabbas Dinner" | 0:34 |
| 8. | "Supermarket" | 2:13 |
| 9. | "Ravs House" | 1:48 |
| 10. | "Beneath the Tree" | 1:53 |
| 11. | "Shower" | 1:17 |
| 12. | "Consequences" | 4:01 |
| 13. | "Alone" | 5:00 |
| 14. | "After the Argument" | 1:14 |
| 15. | "Beyond the Argument" | 0:44 |
| 16. | "Pharmacy" | 3:17 |
| 17. | "Looking for Esti" | 2:09 |
| 18. | "Hesped" | 2:28 |
| 19. | "You Are Free" | 2:01 |
| 20. | "Goodbye" | 6:18 |
| 21. | "For Love" | 4:14 |
| Total length: | | 49:35 |

== Accolades ==
| Awards | Category | Recipient(s) | Result | Ref. |
|---|---|---|---|---|
| Apolo Awards | Best Original Music | Matthew Herbert | Won | |
