= Oliver Coates =

English musician (born 1982)

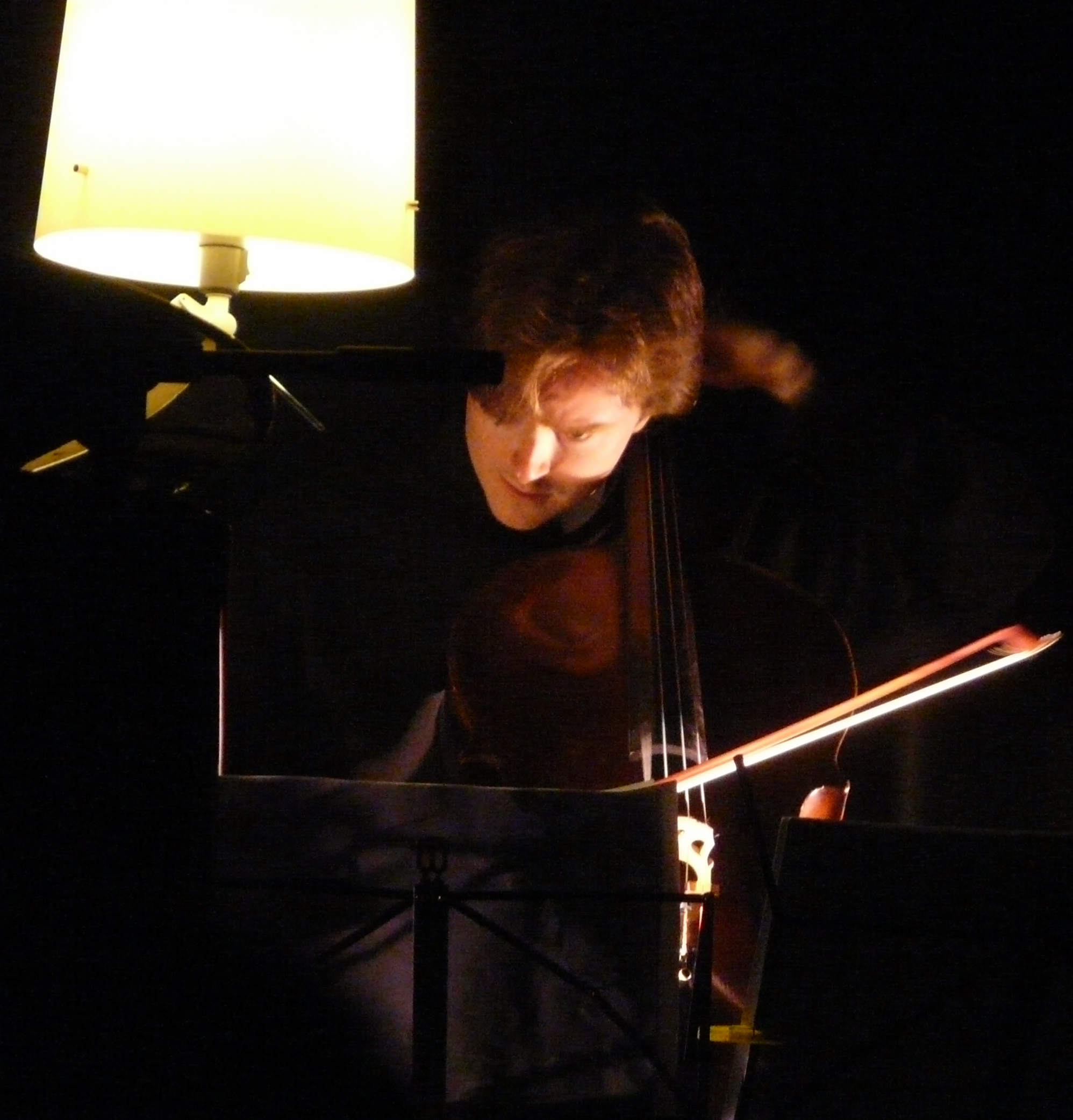
- Oliver Coates performing in 2008

Background information
- Born: 1982 (age 43–44); London, England
- Occupations: Cellist; film composer; music producer
- Years active: 2000s–present
- Labels: Prah; Slip; RVNG Intl.; Line Explorations; Invada

Oliver Coates (born in 1982) is a British cellist, film composer, music producer, and electronic musician from London. He has been signed to RVNG Intl.

== Career ==
Born in London in 1982, Oliver Coates took up the cello at the age of six. He went on to study at the Royal Academy of Music in London, where he received the highest score ever awarded to a student.

After graduating there, he worked with Massive Attack, Goldie, Ben Frost, Micachu & the Shapes, and the Icelandic post-rock band Sigur Rós. In 2009, he worked as a cellist with the South African Mira Calix on a new recording of a song by Boards of Canada for a compilation on Warp Records. This was followed by a collaboration with the guitarist Jonny Greenwood for the music to the Paul Thomas Anderson films There Will Be Blood and The Master. He worked with Mica Levi, on the music for the science fiction thriller Under the Skin by Jonathan Glazer.

Coates also worked with the British rock band Radiohead for their studio album A Moon Shaped Pool, released in 2016. In the same year, he released Remain Calm, a collaborative album with Levi, and his solo album entitled Upstepping. In 2018, Coates released his third solo album Shelley's on Zenn-La. He also released Skins n Slime (2020).

Coates curated two editions of Deep∞Minimalism at the Southbank Centre (2019–2022), showcasing contemporary experimental composers including Éliane Radigue and Pauline Oliveros.

He also composed the music for the films Agatha and the Curse of Ishtar (2019) with Sam Yates, The Stranger (2022) with Thomas M. Wright, and Aftersun (2022) with Charlotte Wells. He worked with Steve McQueen on his documentary Occupied City (2023).

Coates is the main cellist of the London Contemporary Orchestra and lives in Glasgow, Scotland with his wife, where he also works.

== Discography ==
=== Studio albums ===
- Towards the Blessed Islands (Prah, 2013)
- Upstepping (Prah, 2016)
- Remain Calm (with Mica Levi; Slip, 2016)
- Ample Profanity (with Laurie Tompkins, as Laurie & Olly; Slip, 2018)
- Shelley's on Zenn-La (RVNG Intl., 2018)
- Canticles of the Sky / Three High Places (with John Luther Adams; RVNG Intl., 2019)
- Skins n Slime (RVNG Intl., 2020)
- The Pale Faced Family on the Hill (with The Pale Faced Family on the Hill; Line Explorations, 2022)
- Throb, Shiver, Arrow of Time (RVNG Intl., 2024)

=== Soundtrack albums ===
- Significant Other (Invada, 2022)
- The Stranger (Lakeshore, 2022)
- Aftersun (Invada, 2023)
- Mary & George (Invada, 2024)
- Pillion (A24, 2025)

== Filmography ==
=== Film ===
- Agatha and the Curse of Ishtar (2019)
- Significant Other (2022)
- The Stranger (2022)
- Aftersun (2022)
- Foe (2023)
- Occupied City (2023)
- 100 Nights of Hero (2025)
- Pillion (2025)
- The History of Sound (2025)
- Black Church Bay (2027)

=== Television ===
- Mary & George (2024)

== Awards ==
- 2011: Award with the Royal Philharmonic Society Young Artist Award
- 2022: British Independent Film Awards – Nomination for Best Original Music for Aftersun
