= Zola (soundtrack) =

Zola (Original Motion Picture Soundtrack)

Soundtrack album by Mica Levi
- Released: July 2, 2021
- Recorded: 2021
- Genres: Film score; film soundtrack
- Length: 41:21
- Labels: A24 Music; Invada Records
- Producer: Mica Levi

Mica Levi chronology
Monos (2019)	Zola (2021)	The Zone of Interest (2023)

Zola (Original Motion Picture Soundtrack) is the soundtrack album to the 2021 comedy film Zola directed by Janicza Bravo. The film score is composed by Mica Levi who had recorded two hours of music, while only part of their work had been included in the album, that also accompanied songs performed by the cast. The album was released through Invada Records on July 2, 2021, two days after the film's release.

== Development ==
In December 2019, it was announced that Mica Levi would compose the musical score for Zola. Bravo had listened to Levi's work in Under the Skin (2013), whose creation was attributed to a similar working dynamic, which was more foundational, unified and "so simpatico that one can't imagine one without the other" calling it as a marriage between composition and world. Levi closely worked with Bravo on the score, where the latter also provided creative freedom.

Comparing to the darker projects which Levi had composed for, Zola was much different in a more comedic, dialogue-heavy and fast-paced, where "[The characters] are in very musical environments [...] It's not an abstract environment. They're working in clubs. They're working in parts of America that have whole specific scenes of music." As a result, Levi has been challenged with creating a score which stands out from their culture. Retrospectively, Levi described the film as a hyper-modernized take on Greek fantasies. She wrote a recurring theme with the harp, as it was being attached to "things like glamour, heaven, bliss, innocence, purity, and ancient realms" and the instrument, in particular, was also effeminate in nature. Levi further used jewelry boxes, toy pianos and glockenspiels, that convey themes of innocence, but alternatively, these instruments also suggest that the main character is trapped in a game that their counterpart is playing. She summarized "It's probably a good mix of both of those things [...] It must've all come from that sort of thing — being drawn to sweetness." Levi also derived sounds from the iPhone and Twitter-inspired bleeps and bloops, which were meant to be unsettling and unexpectedly "eerie" which they attributed it to photographer Eric Pickersgill's Removed series, wherein he edits smartphones out of people's hands to describe how lonely the people where.

One of the few specific things Bravo told Levi was regarding the use of implementing sound baths; Levi recalled on the use of crystal bowls and rose bowls, whose tones being the inner core of the film's navigation, and sound baths ground people in the way the film does into the story, which were created using percussions that jarringly infiltrate the hazy, sonic clouds. They further added that Zola was intended to be broken down into three parts, both sonically and visually, and referenced the three-panel painting, The Garden of Earthly Delights by Hieronymus Bosch. In terms of structure and pacing, the film was also inspired by the three-act operas, where digital snares driving the film, increasingly become more frenzied and alert the audiences. But the sounds also show something that once being liked would be detrimental in excess, which they added "Something that they were supposed to be having fun to has now turned around and is punishing them [...] Don't have too much fun, because, otherwise, that drum won't stop playing."

== Release ==
Zola's score was released through Invada Records on July 2, 2021 in digital and vinyl formats. A24 Music, the subsidiary label of the film's distributor, A24, jointly released the vinyl edition. The limited-edition vinyl, published by Invada, was pressed through 180-gram purple marble colored disc.

== Track listing ==
No.	Title	Length
1.	"Wanna Hear A Story?" (feat. Zola Cast)	0:58
2.	"Met This White Bitch" (feat. Zola Cast)	0:24
3.	"Vibing"	0:36
4.	"Exchange Numbers"	1:28
5.	"Next Day"	0:44
6.	"Let's Go" (feat. Zola Cast)	1:10
7.	"Tampa"	0:29
8.	"Florida"	1:12
9.	"Friday" (feat. Zola Cast)	1:24
10.	"Full Nude"	0:46
11.	"Pasties & Boy Shorts" (feat. Zola Cast)	0:54
12.	"What Y'all Make"	1:52
13.	"Wanna Trap"	1:29
14.	"Mind Blown"	0:26
15.	"A Mess" (feat. Zola Cast)	1:42
16.	"Thousands" (feat. Zola Cast)	1:34
17.	"Leave A Message" (feat. Zola Cast)	0:46
18.	"Do It Right"	0:45
19.	"500"	1:56
20.	"Dudes"	0:12
21.	"That Was It"	1:19
22.	"Here We Go"	0:45
23.	"WTF Again" (feat. Zola Cast)	0:57
24.	"Lost In The Sauce"	0:36
25.	"Lost In The Game"	0:39
26.	"DAMNNNNNNNNNNNNN"	0:44
27.	"First Client Calls"	1:00
28.	"Handgun"	1:23
29.	"Trusting u"	1:47
30.	"Goes Left"	1:35
31.	"Incall" (feat. Zola Cast)	0:51
32.	"I Was Out"	0:21
33.	"Mannn"	0:42
34.	"Take Off"	0:58
35.	"Movie Shit"	1:08
36.	"Almost Over"	1:59
37.	"Florida Murder"	3:50
Total length:		41:21

== Reception ==
Wendy Ide of The Guardian wrote "Mica Levi's score (one of the film's other key assets) is a dreamy, feathery harp refrain, elated and as light as air." Hanna Flint of Empire wrote "Composer Mica Levi's fluttering harp motif evokes a butterfly-in-your-belly feel as two women fall hard for each other after a chance encounter." Charlotte O'Sullivan of London Evening Standard wrote "The soundtrack, by superlative British composer Mica Levi, is fantastic. When Zola and Stefani first clap eyes on each other they're serenaded by ironically sweet harps; the mood is drowsily magical. Later, wayward electronic sounds give way to primal, repetitive percussive beats that speed up, nightmarishly."

Peter Debruge of Variety called it "characteristically abstract, already synthesized soundscape". David Rooney of The Hollywood Reporter described it as "dreamy". Clint Worthington of Consequence called it a "moody, propulsive trap-tinged score". Adam Graham of The Detroit News wrote: "avant-garde composer Mica Levi's score stacks layers of harps that add to "Zola's" softened version of reality." Emily Weaver of PopSugar wrote "the movie wouldn't be the eye-catching spectacle it is without composer Mica Levi, who recorded more than half of the film's music." Katie Walsh of Los Angeles Times wrote "The sound design, along with Mica Levi's score, offers a sense of rhythm and whimsy to the film, which deftly rides the line between menacing and absurd."

== Awards and nominations ==
Award	Date of ceremony	Category	Recipient(s)	Result	Ref.
Guild of Music Supervisors Awards	March 20, 2022	Best Music Supervision for Films Budgeted Over $5 Million	Mandi Collier, Jen Malone and Nicole Weisberg	Nominated	
