= Jewellery (disambiguation) =

Jewellery or jewelry is a term for personal decorative items to be worn.

It may also refer to:

- Jewellery design
- Jewellery chain
- Jewelry Television
- Jewelry (group), a South Korean music group
- Jewellery (album), a 2009 album by Micachu
- Jewelry (album), a 2019 album by Your Old Droog
