= Remain Calm =

Studio album by Mica Levi and Oliver Coates
- Released: 25 November 2016
- Genre: Experimental
- Length: 27:51
- Label: Slip

Mica Levi chronology
Under the Skin (2014)	Remain Calm (2016)	Jackie (2016)

Oliver Coates chronology
Upstepping (2016)	Remain Calm (2016)	Shelley's on Zenn-La (2018)

Remain Calm is a collaborative studio album by English musicians Mica Levi and Oliver Coates. It was released on 25 November 2016 through Slip. It received generally favorable reviews from critics.

== Background ==
Mica Levi is an English composer, record producer, and singer-songwriter. Oliver Coates is an English cellist. Remain Calm originates from the duo's NTS session in 2014. It consists of 13 tracks, clocking in at 28 minutes. Coates previously provided strings on Levi's soundtrack to the film Under the Skin.

The album was released on 25 November 2016 through Slip. Music videos were released for "Barok Main" and "Dolphins Climb onto Shore for the First Time".

== Critical reception ==
Professional ratings
Aggregate scores
Source	Rating
Metacritic	76/100
Review scores
Source	Rating
AllMusic	4/5 stars
Clash	7/10
Drowned in Sound	6/10
The Line of Best Fit	8/10
Pitchfork	7.7/10
Resident Advisor	3.7/5
Tiny Mix Tapes	3.5/5 stars

According to the review aggregator Metacritic, Remain Calm received "generally favorable reviews" based on a weighted average score of 76 out of 100 from 9 critic scores.

Paul Simpson of AllMusic commented that "It's not exactly a 'fun' album, but there is a sense of playfulness to it, and the duo seem excited to uncover such unexpected combinations of sounds." He added, "The result is an unpredictable, captivating listening experience." Thea Ballard of Pitchfork wrote, "Even as its mood slides from pensive to morose to quietly exuberant, this remains throughout one of the more enjoyable experimental releases this year."

=== Accolades ===
Year-end lists for Remain Calm
Publication	List	Rank	Ref.
The Quietus	The Quietus Albums of the Year 2016	77	
The Vinyl Factory	The 50 Best Albums of 2016	22	

== Track listing ==
All tracks are written by Mica Levi and Oliver Coates.

Remain Calm track listing
No.	Title	Length
1.	"Pre-Barok"	1:57
2.	"Bless Our Toes"	2:32
3.	"Dolphins Climb onto Shore for the First Time"	3:29
4.	"Schoolhouse"	0:42
5.	"Dragon in the Mist"	1:10
6.	"I'll Keep Going"	3:45
7.	"Xhill Stepping"	3:35
8.	"Fight in the Men's Toilets"	0:27
9.	"Barok Main"	3:12
10.	"County H"	1:27
11.	"New Wren Kitch"	2:37
12.	"Say Goodbye to Everyone"	0:35
13.	"Mob of Waters"	2:20
Total length:		27:51

== Personnel ==
Credits adapted from liner notes.

- Mica Levi – performance, mixing
- Oliver Coates – performance, mixing
- Erik Nyström – recording
- Beau Thomas – mastering
- Leah Walker – artwork
