= Under the Skin (soundtrack) =

2014 soundtrack by Mica Levi

Under the Skin (Original Motion Picture Soundtrack)

Film score by Mica Levi
- Released: 28 March 2014
- Genres: Film score; electronic; avant-garde
- Length: 46:57
- Label: Rough Trade Records
- Producers: Mica Levi; Peter Raeburn

Mica Levi chronology
Never (2012)	Under the Skin (2014)	Good Sad Happy Bad (2015)

Under the Skin (Original Motion Picture Soundtrack) is a 2014 soundtrack album to the 2013 film of the same name. Released digitally on 28 March 2014 by Rough Trade Records, the soundtrack was composed by Mica Levi and produced by Peter Raeburn. The score consists of dark ambient music, primarily written and recorded over a span of 10 months, with the pitch of the score being altered at several intervals "to make it feel uncomfortable." While the score consisted of viola, several instruments such as strings and percussions were accompanied in the cues. The album was physically released in CDs on 18 April 2014, and a vinyl edition was released on 10 October by Warner Records and Milan Records, which re-issued the album twice: the first re-issue was released on 12 June 2020 by Mondo and a second re-issue is scheduled for release on 8 July 2022 by Juno Records.

The score opened to critical acclaim praising Levi's minimalistic approach and compositions, and was raved by several contemporary musicians and artists. Been cited as "one of the best film scores", it received accolades at various ceremonies, including a nomination for BAFTA Award for Best Original Music, but could not get shortlisted for 87th Academy Awards. Despite this, the score won several awards at critics associations.

== Development ==
"A lot of the sound is a mixture of bad recording technique, on my part, and not-fine playing. Violas are so harmonic because they contain a lot of air. A viola is not solid, the sound it produces is like a photocopy of a photocopy of a photocopy of something, because you get an airiness, and creepiness, and there's a struggle in that. The vibrato doesn't ring out. It's dead. A lot of the score uses microphones, and any sort of difference of expression there is created by the clashing of microphones. I find that I love that. Those are the things that ended up happening."

— Mica Levi, on recording the score in an interview with IndieWire.

Raeburn suggested Levi to Glazer, who contacted them after hearing Chopped and Screwed, their collaboration with the London Sinfonietta. Glazer wanted the music to express the protagonist's feelings as she experienced things like food and sex for the first time, and directed Levi with prompts such as "What does it sound like to be on fire?" or "Imagine when you tell somebody a joke and it's not very good and their reaction's a bit stilted". Later scenes use less music, to emphasise the sounds of the natural world that Johansson's character experiences, which she felt that writing the score was "quite improvised". After, Glazer showed them a few pieces of footage from the film, Levi asked Glazer about what the music could be in "an abstract way" and Glazer suggested they follow their own trajectory. Glazer further stated to Pitchfork in an interview saying "We had a lot of discussions about what sounds might work and what wouldn't, and when we heard the ones that sounded right, they became the language for the film. All those bendy and stretched notes just felt correct. It came half from the heart, half from the head."

Levi used mainly a viola to write and record over ten months, taking inspiration from Giacinto Scelsi, Iannis Xenakis, John Cage and music played in strip clubs. They looked for the natural and "identifiably human" sounds in the instrument, then altered the pitch or tempo of their recordings to make them feel "uncomfortable". In an article for the Guardian, Levi wrote: "Some parts are intended to be quite difficult. If your life force is being distilled by an alien, it's not necessarily going to sound very nice. It's supposed to be physical, alarming, hot."

According to Pitchfork, "the strings sometimes resemble nails going down a universe-sized chalkboard, screaming with a Ligeti-like sense of horror; elsewhere, they endlessly drone in a gaping vortex, like Vangelis' iconic Blade Runner score dipped in turpentine". The Guardian wrote that Levi's "score brings together strings, percussion, distortions in speed and clashing microphones to create sounds that are seductive, perverted and compassionate."

== Reception ==
Professional ratings
Review scores
Source	Rating
AllMusic	5/5 stars
Consequence of Sound	B+
Drowned in Sound	8/10
The Line of Best Fit	9/10
Pitchfork	7.3/10

Under the Skin's score received high critical acclaim with praise directed on Levi's instrumentation and minimalist approach. For the website AllMusic, Heather Phares called the score a "fantastic study in tension and terror" and an "exciting beginning to what will hopefully be a lengthy career for Levi as a solo artist and film composer". In the review for Consequence.net, Michael Roffman called it as a "terrifying soundtrack" that mirrors to the music of Stanley Kubrick's films: 2001: A Space Odyssey (1968), The Shining (1980) and Eyes Wide Shut (1999), further writing that "The way Glazer wraps the score around every shot produces a tension that's near suffocating." Writing for the music website Drowned in Sound, Jon Clark called Levi's score "is as unique as the film itself, working as well in isolation as it accompaniment".

For The Line of Best Fit, Kate Travers gave 9/10 to the soundtrack and said "The Under the Skin score matches Glazer's understated, minimal aesthetic scene for scene. Never does the music outweigh the carefully constructed silences and – as all good film music must – it only ever adds to the potent illusion of a twisted, heart-rending reality." Pitchfork gave 7.3 out of 10 to the score and stated "The music unfolds as deliberately and as unconsciously as the dreamlike film itself. Levi's commitment to the film's themes is all-consuming, and the score is so tightly woven into the film's DNA that it is difficult to detach and experience as an album."

Several website listed it as one of the best scores of 2014, including Empire, PopMatters, IndieWire and Collider. Composer Mike Patton said the Under the Skin soundtrack was the only contemporary soundtrack that had left an impression on him, praising Levi's minimalist approach. Musician Steven Wilson said Under the Skin was his favourite film of the last decade and praised its "absolutely brilliant" music. In 2019, Pitchfork ranked the soundtrack the 154th best album of the 2010s, the 18th greatest industrial album and the second-best film score of all time. IndieWire called it as "one of the best scores of the 21st century", and Collider called it as "one of the five best film scores by alternative musicians" and wrote:

"Levi's score for Under the Skin serves as a reflection of the alien's mindset; this means it's cold, strange, and creepy as hell. "Creation" soundtracks the alien's "birth" with a microtonal swarm of buzzing violas. The sinister "Lipstick to Void" lopes with the patience of an apex predator, its whining strings and steady heartbeat rhythm adding a note of uncomfortable sensuality. Most compelling of all is "Love", a swooning, achingly tender synth reverie that represents the alien's burgeoning humanity."

== Track listing ==
No.	Title	Length
1.	"Creation"	2:47
2.	"Lipstick to Void"	6:41
3.	"Andrew Void"	2:14
4.	"Meat to Maths"	2:00
5.	"Drift"	6:58
6.	"Lonely Void"	3:38
7.	"Mirror to Vortex"	2:35
8.	"Bedroom"	1:30
9.	"Love"	5:10
10.	"Bothy"	1:22
11.	"Death"	4:39
12.	"Alien Loop"	7:20
Total length:		46:57

== Release history ==
Region	Date (Note: All versions in United Kingdom and United States were released under the catalog code M2-36678, whereas the Europe release catalog code was 399 543-2)	Format(s)	Label	Ref.
Worldwide	28 March 2014	Digital download; streaming	Rough Trade Records	
United States	18 April 2014	CD	Milan Records; Warner Records	
United Kingdom	18 April 2014	CD	Milan Records; Warner Records	
Europe	2 May 2014	CD	Milan Records; Warner Records	
United States	10 October 2014	Vinyl	Milan Records; Warner Records	
United States	12 June 2020	Vinyl	Mondo	
United States	8 July 2022	Vinyl	Juno	

== Personnel ==
Credits adapted from CD liner notes

- Mica Levi – composer, arranger, producer, viola
- Peter Raeburn – arranger, producer, music supervisor
- Jay James – music supervisor
- Max Ruisi – cello
- Oliver Coates – cello
- Charlotte Kerbegian – double bass
- Harriet Scott – double bass
- Laura Murphy – double bass
- Marc Pell – drums
- Benjamin Griffiths – flute
- Anisa Arslanagic – viola
- Vince Sipprell – viola
- Emma Smith – violin
- Eugene Feygelson – violin
- Max Baillie – violin
- Rebecca Gardiner – violin
- Evan Jolly – orchestrator
- Goetz Botzenhardt – score engineer
- Luis Almau – score engineer
- Ray Staff – score mastering
- Simone Filiali – additional score mixer
- Jake Jackson – score mixer
- Johnnie Burn – sound designer

== Accolades ==
Under the Skin was not shortlisted for nominations at the 87th Academy Awards including Best Original Score for Mica Levi, as factors such as the box office failure, film festival release in 2013 before its final theatrical premiere in 2014, and non-contemporary narrative, being attributed, according to Entertainment Weekly. The score, however, nominated for and won many awards in critics association and online pole votes.

Award	Date of ceremony	Category	Recipient(s)	Result	Ref(s)
ASCAP Film and Television Music Awards	9 March 2015	Best Film Score	Mica Levi	Nominated	
British Academy Film Awards	8 February 2015	Best Original Music	Mica Levi	Nominated	
British Independent Film Awards	8 December 2013	Best Technical Achievement (music)	Mica Levi	Nominated	
Chicago Film Critics Association	15 December 2014	Best Original Score	Mica Levi	Won	
European Film Awards	13 December 2014	Best Composer	Mica Levi	Won	
Fangoria Chainsaw Awards	2015	Best Score	Mica Levi	Won	
Florida Film Critics Circle	19 December 2014	Best Score	Mica Levi	Won	
Indiewire Film Critics' Poll	15 December 2014	Best Original Score or Soundtrack	Mica Levi	Won	
International Film Music Critics Association Awards	2015	Breakthrough Composer of the Year	Mica Levi	Won	
Kermode Awards	2015	Best Original Score	Mica Levi	Won	
London Film Critics Circle Awards	18 January 2015	Technical Achievement Award (score)	Mica Levi	Won	
Los Angeles Film Critics Association	7 December 2014	Best Original Score	Mica Levi	Won	
St. Louis Gateway Film Critics Association	2014	Best Music Score	Mica Levi	Nominated	
Washington D.C. Area Film Critics Association	8 December 2014	Best Original Score	Mica Levi	Won	
