= Monos (soundtrack) =

2019 film soundtrack album

Film score by Mica Levi
- Released: August 30, 2019
- Recorded: 2019
- Genre: Film score
- Length: 29:35
- Labels: Lakeshore; Invada
- Producer: Mica Levi

Mica Levi chronology
Marjorie Prime (2017)	Monos (2019)	Zola (2021)

Monos is the soundtrack album to the 2019 film Monos directed by Alejandro Landes. The film's original score is composed and produced by Mica Levi and was released through Lakeshore Records on August 30, 2019.

== Background ==
Monos is the fourth film scored by Mica Levi, following Under the Skin, Jackie, and Marjorie Prime. Levi came on board after seeing an unfinished cut. Alejandro Landes asked Levi for a "monumental, but minimal" score. Levi first made short compositions involving whistles, made by Levi blowing into a glass bottle, timpani, and a synthesizer sound, around which further compositions were built. Different sounds were assigned to represent various characters: a shrill bottle whistle became the "authority whistle", evoking the presence of the Organization; a bird-like whistle represented the bond among the child soldiers; and timpani accompanied with the authority whistle represented "the shadowy force that tries to control the group from a distance". The score is used sparingly throughout the film, taking up only 22 minutes.

== Release ==
The score album was released through Lakeshore Records and Invada Records on August 30, 2019.

== Reception ==
Andy Beta of Pitchfork rated 7.8 out of 10 ot the score and wrote "Levi's score for Brazilian writer/director Alejandro Landes' Monos is similar to her work for Under the Skin: It utilizes only a smattering of sounds to craft a world of deepening dread [...] [and] keeps a firm grasp throughout, growing unhinged yet never quite losing control." Sheila O'Malley of RogerEbert.com wrote "Composer Mica Levi's omnipresent electronic score creates an unnerving undercurrent, throbbing with menace and danger."

Jessica Kiang of Variety wrote "with Mica Levi turning in the latest of her irreplaceable film scores, "Monos" becomes even more its own, alien thing. Gargantuan mountain drums rumble under tiny fluting pipes, and over images of endless, perilous countryside we are swamped in industrial noises that sound like the throbbing of turbines or the thwapping of a chopper's blades. Like so much else here, the music thrives on the discordant energy released when you place things that do not belong together — like the words "child" and "soldier" — in close proximity." Simon Tucker of Louder Than War wrote "Monos is a score that serves as a rather beautiful environmentalist protest album. Levi's tightrope act of the natural sound and studio machinery feels like a hymn to the very Earth we walk on. A plea for us to do something about the oncoming and inevitable disaster that is man made climate change [...] Monos is crystal clear one moment and dank and dense the next with never a moment that feels jarring or out of place. It is also further proof that in Mica Levi we truly are in the presence of greatness."

The Film Scorer wrote "With Monos, Mica Levi has further established themselves as the foremost contemporary experimental film composer, using dissonance and unconventional instrumentation and composition to build tension and unease." Ian Freer of Empire called Levi's "brutal percussive score" as "one of the best of 2019". Tim Grierson of Screen International wrote "Oscar-nominated composer Mica Levi's percussive score serves as both anxiety-inducer and a sonic reframing of what we're watching". Mark Kermode of The Guardian wrote "Through it all runs the pulsing blood of Mica Levi's spine-tingling score. At the top end of its strange frequencies, we find whistles that echo the handmade bird calls of the teenagers, but which also sounded to me like lonely radio signals or sonar, highlighting the sense of isolation. Underneath, we have a cacophony of timpani and electronica, trembling with the thunderous experience of a kiss, juddering through the adrenalised exhaustion of a workout or rumbling like a volcano waiting to erupt. Interwoven with the film's soundscape, Levi's music is as boldly adventurous as the movie itself – haunting, challenging, affecting, alarming and utterly mesmerising."

Glenn Kenny of The New York Times wrote "The score, by Mica Levi, is precision-engineered postmodern discomfort." David Fear of Rolling Stone wrote "[Levi's] score sounds like an auto-tuned engine downshifting". Keith Uhlich of The Hollywood Reporter wrote "Mica Levi's unnerving score, which is one of the few creative elements above reproach, certainly helps with the sense of moral dislocation."

== Track listing ==
No.	Title	Length
1.	"Guerreros"	1:39
2.	"Mensajero"	0:40
3.	"Lobo y Lady"	2:22
4.	"Aullido"	1:36
5.	"Solos"	3:06
6.	"Funeral"	1:07
7.	"Honguitos"	2:06
8.	"A la Selva"	1:16
9.	"Sin Radio"	3:27
10.	"Castigo"	1:06
11.	"El Regreso de Patagrande"	1:12
12.	"Pisa Suave"	3:20
13.	"Corre"	1:27
14.	"Helicóptero"	1:11
15.	"Monos"	4:00
Total length:		29:35

== Accolades ==
Award	Date of ceremony	Category	Recipients	Result	Ref.
Buenos Aires International Festival of Independent Cinema	13 April 2019	Best Original Music	Mica Levi	Won	
Ghent International Film Festival	18 October 2019	Georges Delerue Award for Best Original Music	Mica Levi	Won	
