= Skins n Slime =

Studio album by Oliver Coates
- Released: 16 October 2020
- Genre: Ambient
- Length: 44:09
- Label: RVNG Intl.

Oliver Coates chronology
Shelley's on Zenn-La (2018)	Skins n Slime (2020)	Throb, Shiver, Arrow of Time (2024)

Skins n Slime is a studio album by English cellist Oliver Coates. It was released on 16 October 2020 through RVNG Intl. It received universal acclaim from critics.

== Background ==
Oliver Coates is an English cellist from London. Skins n Slime is a follow-up to Shelley's on Zenn-La (2018). He completed the album in Glasgow, Scotland, in late 2019. It was released on 16 October 2020 through RVNG Intl. A portion of the proceeds from the sales of the album goes to Down's Syndrome Scotland. Music videos were released for "Butoh Baby", "Honey", and "Soaring X".

== Critical reception ==
Professional ratings
Aggregate scores
Source	Rating
Metacritic	84/100
Review scores
Source	Rating
Beats Per Minute	80%
Loud and Quiet	8/10
Pitchfork	8.0/10

According to the review aggregator Metacritic, Skins n Slime received "universal acclaim" based on a weighted average score of 84 out of 100 from 4 critic scores.

Luke Cartledge of Loud and Quiet stated, "with conventional percussion largely shunned, and pulsating, processed beams of strings suggesting rather than insisting on meter, the record at once feels more liberated and more oppressive than anything he's done before." He added, "The skippy delicacy of much of Oliver Coates' previous work is traded in for an amorphous weight, disorientating and harsh, yet not without nuance." Jazz Monroe of Pitchfork wrote, "Coates takes almost sadistic pleasure in contorting, abrading, vaporizing, ensliming, and otherwise transmogrifying the instrument he has played since childhood."

=== Accolades ===
Year-end lists for Skins n Slime
Publication	List	Rank	Ref.
Bandcamp Daily	Best of 2020: It Got Heavy	—	
The Wire	Releases of the Year (2020 Rewind)	37	

== Track listing ==
All tracks are written by Oliver Coates, except "Soaring X" by Coates and Malibu.

Skins n Slime track listing
No.	Title	Length
1.	"Caregiver Part 1" (Breathing)	4:50
2.	"Caregiver Part 2" (4AM)	5:39
3.	"Caregiver Part 3" (Slorki)	1:47
4.	"Caregiver Part 4" (Spirit)	3:37
5.	"Caregiver Part 5" (Money)	5:03
6.	"Philomela Mutation" (from The Bird Game soundtrack)	2:25
7.	"Butoh Baby"	3:16
8.	"Reunification 2018"	4:43
9.	"Still Life"	3:05
10.	"Honey"	6:09
11.	"Soaring X" (featuring Malibu)	3:30
Total length:		44:09

== Personnel ==
Credits adapted from liner notes.

- Oliver Coates – recording
- Malibu – recording (on "Soaring X")
- Guy Davie – mastering
- Will Work for Good – design
