= Upstepping =

Studio album by Oliver Coates
- Released: 13 May 2016
- Length: 45:02
- Label: Prah
- Producer: Oliver Coates

Oliver Coates chronology
Towards the Blessed Islands (2013)	Upstepping (2016)	Shelley's on Zenn-La (2018)

Upstepping is the second studio album by English cellist Oliver Coates. It was released on 13 May 2016 through Prah Recordings.

== Background ==
Oliver Coates is an English cellist from London. Upstepping is his second solo album, following Towards the Blessed Islands (2013). In a 2016 interview, Stephen Bass, the founder of Prah Recordings, recalled, "I firmly believed that a lot of people whose music I respect from the dance world would really love Oliver's first album, so I wanted to do something that was going to catch the ears of those people." Most sounds on Upstepping originate from the cello which he played and then processed digitally. The album was released on 13 May 2016 through Prah Recordings.

== Critical reception ==
Professional ratings
Review scores
Source	Rating
AllMusic	4/5 stars
Clash	9/10
Loud and Quiet	9/10
MusicOMH	4/5 stars

Gareth James of Clash described Upstepping as "a bizarre, ambitious and outrageously good record." Tom Fenwick of Loud and Quiet commented that it "blends stark electronica and experimental classicism into a magnificent album, which sees Coates skirt the edge of perfection." Bekki Bemrose of AllMusic wrote, "Unsurprisingly, it's a work that has seen him likened to the late Arthur Russell, and on the strength of this collection, it's a deserved comparison." Ben Hogwood of MusicOMH stated, "Because of the ebb and flow, that movement between frenetic and calm, Upstepping makes a strong and lasting impact."

=== Accolades ===
Year-end lists for Upstepping
Publication	List	Rank	Ref.
Loud and Quiet	The Loud and Quiet Top 40 Albums of 2016	7	
MusicOMH	musicOMH's Top 50 Albums of 2016	38	

== Track listing ==
All tracks are written by Oliver Coates.

Upstepping track listing
No.	Title	Length
1.	"Innocent Love"	7:20
2.	"Timelapse (Walrus)"	7:40
3.	"Bambi 2046"	5:16
4.	"Perfect Love"	6:53
5.	"Memorial to Hitchens"	2:54
6.	"The Irish Book of Death & Flying Ships"	2:56
7.	"Stash"	8:18
8.	"Rise & Fall"	3:42
Total length:		45:02

Notes

- The vinyl edition does not include "Rise & Fall".

== Personnel ==
Credits adapted from liner notes.

- Oliver Coates – production
- Lawrence Lek – artwork
- Fraser Muggeridge – design
- Paul Rafferty – layout
