= Jewellery (album) =

Studio album by Micachu
- Released: 9 March 2009
- Recorded: 2008–2009
- Genres: Avant-pop; art pop; electronic pop; experimental pop
- Length: 31:24
- Labels: Rough Trade; Accidental
- Producers: Mica Levi; Matthew Herbert

Micachu chronology
Filthy Friends Mixtape (2009)	Jewellery (2009)	Never (2012)

Jewellery is the debut studio album by English musician Micachu, co-produced by Matthew Herbert. It was released on 9 March 2009 on a joint venture between Rough Trade Records and Accidental Records. The album features Micachu's band the Shapes, which comprises Raisa Khan (keyboards and electronics) and Marc Pell (percussion and drums).

== Reception ==
Professional ratings
Aggregate scores
Source	Rating
AnyDecentMusic?	7.6/10
Metacritic	75/100
Review scores
Source	Rating
AllMusic	4/5 stars
Blender	4/5 stars
The Guardian	4/5 stars
The Irish Times	4/5 stars
Pitchfork	7.9/10
Q	4/5 stars
Rolling Stone	4/5 stars
Spin	7/10
The Times	4/5 stars
Uncut	3/5 stars

Upon its release, Jewellery received generally positive reviews from critics. It maintains a 75 score on Metacritic. Most reviews, both positive and negative, emphasized the originality and experimental, sometimes difficult nature of the music. Drowned in Sound praised the experimental sound of the album calling it "thrillingly improbable pop made by a grade-A maverick." The Guardian similarly praised the music for combining "hard experimentation with soft introspection, her scrappy, lo-fi production wrapped in warmth."

Some reviews were more mixed, but again focused on the experimental sound. PopMatters noted the challenging nature of the music: "The whole experience seems crowded with random experimentation for its own sake," adding, "With a little patience, however, Jewellery soon orders itself." Under the Radar was less sympathetic, asserting, "The record is admirable for its crashing ambitions, but it unfortunately devolves into a tuneless, nearly unlistenable mire of avant-noise fragments."

== Track listing ==
No.	Title	Length
1.	"Vulture"	2:49
2.	"Lips"	1:21
3.	"Sweetheart"	0:53
4.	"Eat Your Heart"	2:20
5.	"Curly Teeth"	2:27
6.	"Golden Phone"	2:43
7.	"Ship"	1:59
8.	"Floor"	1:22
9.	"Just in Case"	2:46
10.	"Calculator"	3:09
11.	"Wrong"	3:35
12.	"Turn Me Well"	2:58
13.	"Guts"	3:12
14.	"Hardcore" (hidden track)	1:33

Notes

- Early review versions of the album sent by Accidental Records before the Rough Trade deal included an additional song called "Worst Bastard" (likely removed for being the only song containing obscenities) and listed "Hardcore" as a normal track rather than a bonus track.

== Charts ==
Chart (2009)	Peak position
UK Independent Albums (Official Charts)	20
