= Never (Micachu and the Shapes album) =

Studio album by Micachu and the Shapes
- Released: 23 July 2012
- Genres: Experimental pop, noise pop
- Length: 35:10
- Label: Rough Trade Records

Micachu and the Shapes chronology
Jewellery (2009)	Never (2012)	Good Sad Happy Bad (2015)

Professional ratings
Aggregate scores
Source	Rating
Metacritic	76/100
Review scores
Source	Rating
AllMusic	3.5/5 stars
Clash	8/10
Consequence of Sound	C+
Fact	4/5
The Guardian	4/5 stars
The List	3/5 stars
NME	8/10
Pitchfork	7.3/10
PopMatters	6/10 stars
Spin	8/10

Never is the second studio album by Micachu and the Shapes. It was released through Rough Trade Records on 23 July 2012.

== Critical reception ==
At Metacritic, which assigns a weighted average score out of 100 to reviews from mainstream critics, the album received an average score of 76% based on 24 reviews, indicating "generally favorable reviews".

=== Accolades ===
Publication	Accolade	Rank	Ref.
Clash	Top 40 Albums of 2012	30	
Uncut	Top 75 New Albums of 2012	33	

== Track listing ==
No.	Title	Length
1.	"Easy"	1:49
2.	"Never"	1:38
3.	"Waste"	1:56
4.	"Slick"	2:49
5.	"OK"	3:31
6.	"Low Dogg"	2:41
7.	"Holiday"	2:25
8.	"Heaven"	2:58
9.	"You Know"	1:32
10.	"Glamour"	1:19
11.	"Top Floor"	0:47
12.	"Fall"	4:12
13.	"Nothing"	4:57
14.	"Nowhere"	2:36

== Personnel ==
- Micachu and the Shapes – performance
- Micachu – mixing
- Wesley Gonzalez – vocals (on "Nothing")
- Dilip Harris – recording, mixing
