= Washington D.C. Area Film Critics Association Award for Best Score =

Annual award

The Washington D.C. Area Film Critics Association Award for Best Score is one of the annual awards given by the Washington D.C. Area Film Critics Association. The award was first given in 2010.

== Winners and nominees ==
=== 2010s ===
Year	Nominees	Film
2010	Hans Zimmer	Inception
2010	Carter Burwell	True Grit
2010	Clint Mansell	Black Swan
2010	A. R. Rahman	127 Hours
2010	Trent Reznor and Atticus Ross	The Social Network
2011	Ludovic Bource	The Artist
2011	Cliff Martinez	Drive
2011	Trent Reznor and Atticus Ross	The Girl with the Dragon Tattoo
2011	Howard Shore	Hugo
2011	John Williams	War Horse
2012	Jonny Greenwood	The Master
2012	Alexandre Desplat	Moonrise Kingdom
2012	Dan Romer and Benh Zeitlin	Beasts of the Southern Wild
2012	Howard Shore	The Hobbit: An Unexpected Journey
2012	John Williams	Lincoln
2013	Hans Zimmer	12 Years a Slave
2013	Christophe Beck	Frozen
2013	Arcade Fire	Her
2013	Thomas Newman	Saving Mr. Banks
2013	Steven Price	Gravity
2014	Mica Levi	Under the Skin
2014	Jóhann Jóhannsson	The Theory of Everything
2014	Trent Reznor and Atticus Ross	Gone Girl
2014	Antonio Sánchez	Birdman or (The Unexpected Virtue of Ignorance)
2014	Hans Zimmer	Interstellar
2015	Jóhann Jóhannsson	Sicario
2015	Michael Brook	Brooklyn
2015	Carter Burwell	Carol
2015	Tom Holkenborg	Mad Max: Fury Road
2015	Ennio Morricone	The Hateful Eight
2016	Justin Hurwitz	La La Land
2016	Nicholas Britell	Moonlight
2016	Jóhann Jóhannsson	Arrival
2016	Mica Levi	Jackie
2016	Cliff Martinez	The Neon Demon
2017	Hans Zimmer and Benjamin Wallfisch	Blade Runner 2049
2017	Carter Burwell	Three Billboards Outside Ebbing, Missouri
2017	Alexandre Desplat	The Shape of Water
2017	Michael Giacchino	Coco
2017	Hans Zimmer	Dunkirk
2018	Nicholas Britell	If Beale Street Could Talk
2018	Ludwig Göransson	Black Panther
2018	Justin Hurwitz	First Man
2018	Thom Yorke	Suspiria
2018	Hans Zimmer	Widows
2019	Michael Abels	Us
2019	Alexandre Desplat	Little Women
2019	Hildur Guðnadóttir	Joker
2019	Thomas Newman	1917
2019	Randy Newman	Marriage Story

=== 2020s ===
Year	Nominees	Film
2020	Jon Batiste, Trent Reznor, and Atticus Ross	Soul
2020	Ludwig Göransson	Tenet
2020	James Newton Howard	News of the World
2020	Emile Mosseri	Minari
2020	Trent Reznor and Atticus Ross	Mank
2021	Hans Zimmer	Dune
2021	Aaron and Bryce Dessner	Cyrano
2021	Alexandre Desplat	The French Dispatch
2021	Jonny Greenwood	The Power of the Dog
2021	Jonny Greenwood	Spencer
2022	Michael Giacchino	The Batman
2022	Alexandre Desplat	Guillermo del Toro's Pinocchio
2022	Hildur Guðnadóttir	Tár
2022	Hildur Guðnadóttir	Women Talking
2022	John Williams	The Fabelmans
2023	Ludwig Göransson	Oppenheimer
2023	Kris Bowers	The Color Purple
2023	Jerskin Fendrix	Poor Things
2023	Daniel Pemberton	Spider-Man: Across the Spider-Verse
2023	Robbie Robertson	Killers of the Flower Moon
2024	Daniel Blumberg	The Brutalist
2024	Trent Reznor and Atticus Ross	Challengers
2024	Volker Bertelmann	Conclave
2024	Kris Bowers	The Wild Robot
2024	Robin Carolan	Nosferatu
2024	Hans Zimmer	Blitz
2025	Ludwig Göransson	Sinners
2025	Alexandre Desplat	Frankenstein
2025	Jonny Greenwood	One Battle After Another
2025	Daniel Lopatin	Marty Supreme
2025	Max Richter	Hamnet

== See also ==
- List of film music awards § Best score
