= Olivier Père =

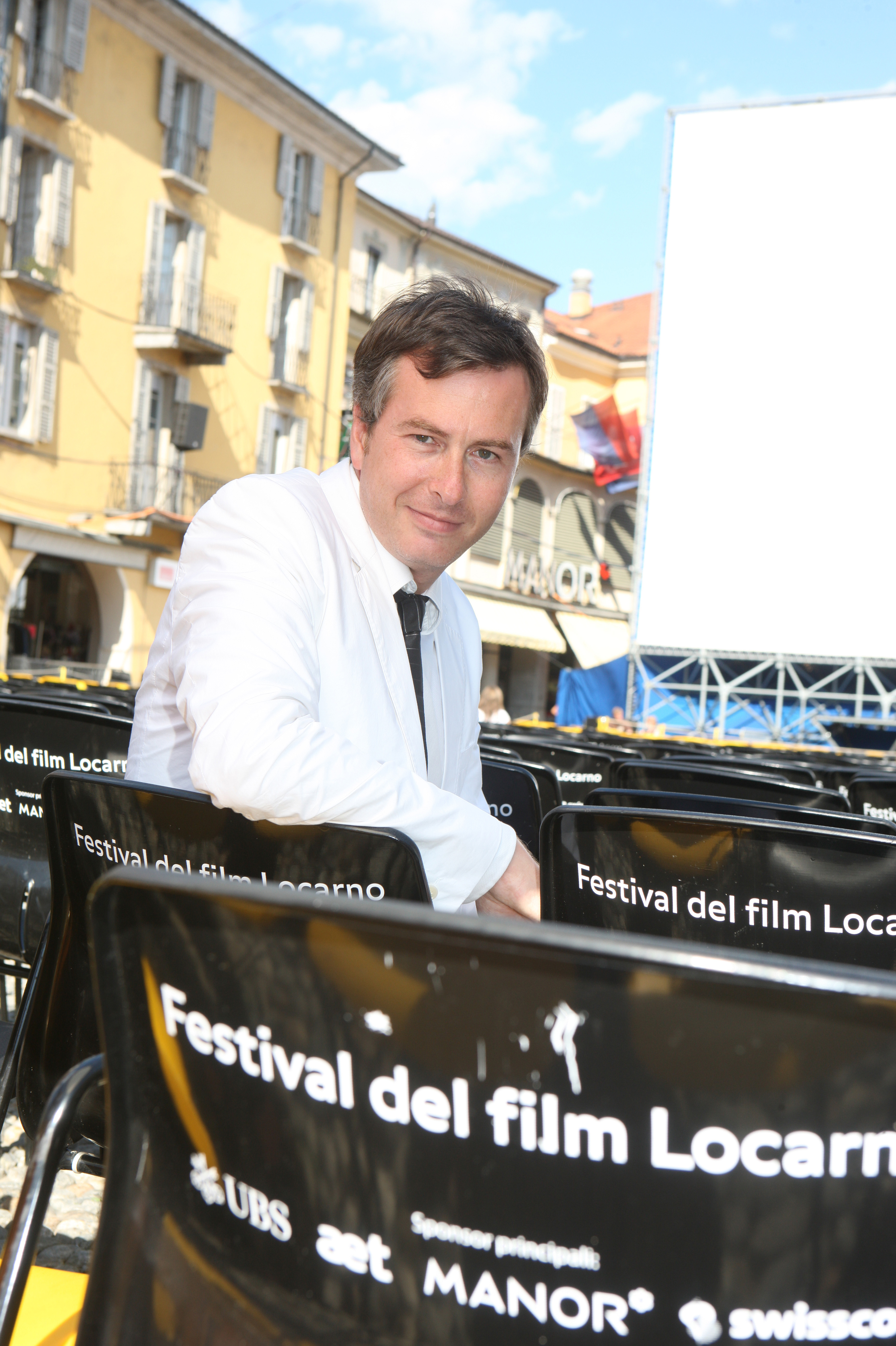
- Olivier Père at the Festival del film Locarno in Piazza Grande (Locarno)
- Born: 17 March 1971 (age 54); Marseille, France
- Occupation: Managing Director of Arte France Cinéma
- Website: Official Blog

Born in 1971 in Marseille, a French national, Olivier Père graduated with a degree in Humanities from the University of Sorbonne (Paris IV).

He joined the French Cinémathèque in 1995, and soon became in charge of the programme, organizing numerous retrospectives and thematic seasons. Alongside his work there, in 1996 he began a long-standing collaboration with the Belfort "Entrevues" Film Festival, for whom he organized retrospectives. Since 1997 he has been writing for the cultural publication "Les Inrockuptibles" on film, television, and DVD.

Between 2004 and 2009, Olivier Père headed the Directors' Fortnight, independent section at the Cannes Film Festival, organized by SRF (Société des Réalisateurs de films).

From September 1, 2009 until 2012 Olivier Père was the artistic director of the Festival del film Locarno.

In 2012, he became Managing Director of Arte France Cinéma, a subsidiary of Arte France.

== Bibliography ==
- Jacquest Demy tout entier, by Marie Colmant and Olivier Père, Anthologie, 12.2010
- Take 100 - The Future of film: 100 New Directors, Cameron Bailey and Piers Handling, Trevor Groth, Kim Dong-Ho, Li Cheuk-to, Frédéric Maire, Marco Müller, Olivier Père, Azize Tan, Christoph Terhechte, Sergio Wolf, Phaidon Press
