= Good Sad Happy Bad =

British pop band

- Also known as: Micachu and the Shapes (2008–2016)
- Genres: Avant-pop; lo-fi pop; indie pop; experimental pop
- Years active: 2008–present
- Labels: Textile; Rough Trade; Accidental
- Members: CJ Calderwood; Marc Pell; Mica Levi; Raisa Khan

Good Sad Happy Bad (formerly known as Micachu and the Shapes) is a British band formed in 2008 by Mica Levi a/k/a Micachu (vocals, guitar, electronics), Raisa Khan, also known as Raisa K (keyboards, vocals), and Marc Pell (drums, vocals). Initially fronted by Levi, they released their debut album Jewellery in 2008 via Rough Trade and Accidental Records. The group changed their name in 2016, and were joined by CJ Calderwood (saxophone, electronics, vocals), with Khan assuming the role of lead vocalist.

== History ==
=== Micachu and the Shapes ===
Their debut album, Jewellery, produced with electronic musician Matthew Herbert, was recorded around Levi's composition studies at Guildhall School. Advance copies of the record reached the press in early 2009, and generated positive feedback. In the wake of this growing buzz, Micachu and the Shapes were signed to Rough Trade, which released Jewellery on 9 March 2009. Drowned in Sound consequently hailed the record as "thrillingly improbable pop made by a grade-A maverick".

In 2009, the band received a grant from the PRS for Music Foundation. Micachu and the Shapes toured widely throughout the UK, including performances at Bestival and V Festival. The band played in the US at the CMJ Music Marathon in New York City and SXSW in Austin, Texas. They also performed on the main stage of the Siren Music Festival at Coney Island in Brooklyn, in July 2009. Touring continued throughout Europe and North America in the summer and fall of 2009. In early 2010, Micachu and the Shapes supported Spoon on tour throughout North America.

The band performed with the London Sinfonietta at Kings Place, London, in May 2010, and in March 2011 released the live recording as the album Chopped and Screwed. Unlike their previous effort, the recording largely avoided pop sensibilities in favor of a slower, hip-hop indebted style and repetitive, discordant string arrangements. The band were chosen by Animal Collective to perform at the All Tomorrow's Parties festival that they curated in May 2011 in Minehead, England.

The follow-up to their debut, Never, was released on 23 July 2012. The band then released the album Good Sad Happy Bad on 11 September 2015.

=== Good Sad Happy Bad ===
In March 2016, the band announced on social media that they were changing their name to Good Sad Happy Bad. The band then expanded to a four-piece, adding multi-instrumentalist and producer CJ Calderwood and Raisa Khan becoming the band's lead vocalist.

In September 2020, the band announced their return with a new single, "Shades". The track served as the title track to Shades, the band's fourth studio album and first under the name Good Sad Happy Bad. It was released on October 16, 2020, via Textile Records. Their fifth album, All Kinds of Days, was released on November 8, 2024. The album was created through instrumental improvisations which vocals were then added to. All four members of the band sing on the album.

== Discography ==
=== Studio albums ===
- Jewellery (2009, Accidental, Rough Trade) (as Micachu, featuring the Shapes)
- Never (2012, Rough Trade) (as Micachu and the Shapes)
- Good Sad Happy Bad (2015, Rough Trade) (as Micachu and the Shapes)
- Shades (2020, Textile) (as Good Sad Happy Bad)
- All Kinds of Days (2024, Textile) (as Good Sad Happy Bad)

=== Live albums ===
- Chopped and Screwed (2011, Remote Control, Rough Trade) (as Micachu and the Shapes with the London Sinfonietta)
