= Mica Levi =

English musician (born 1987)

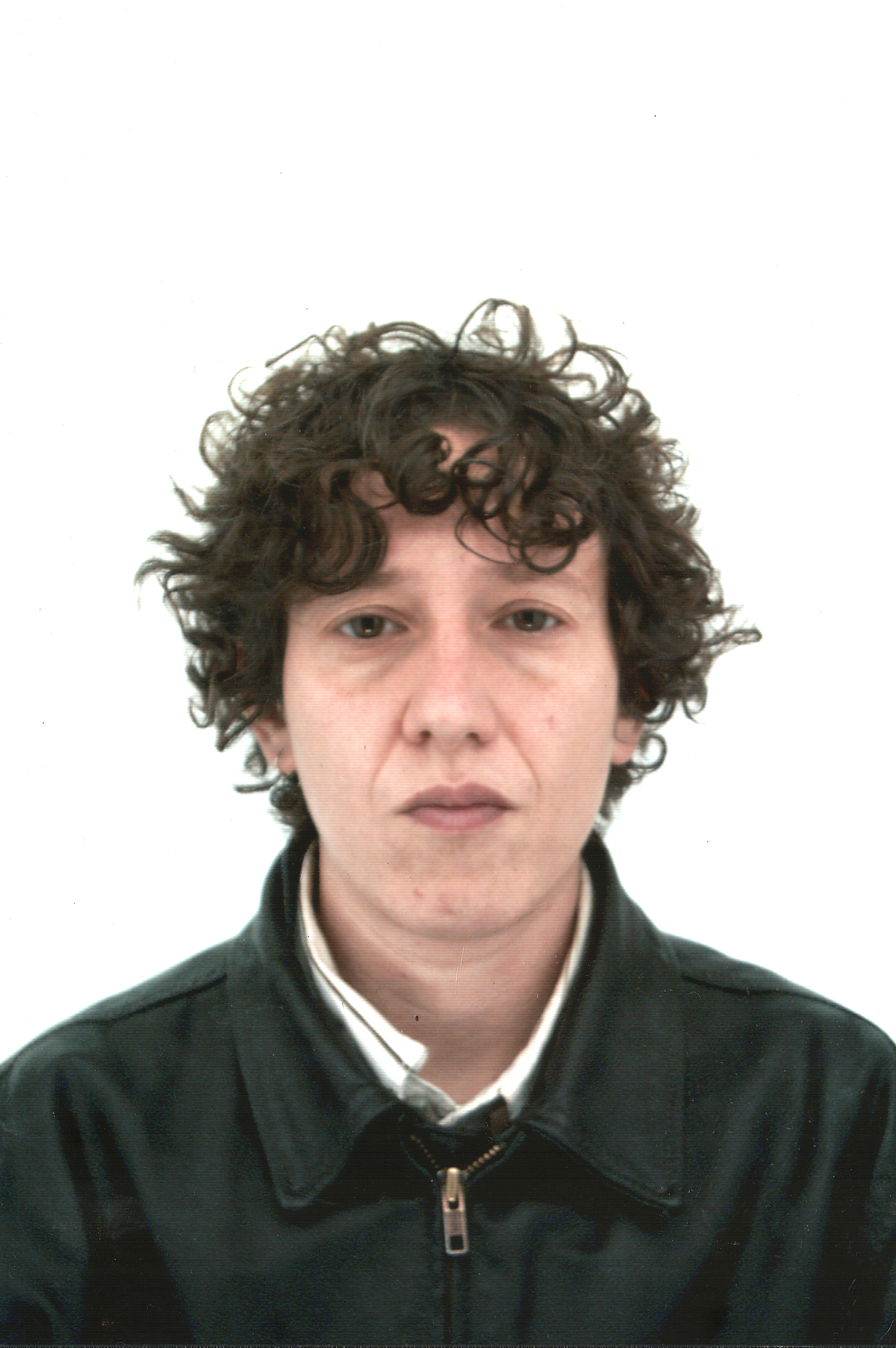
- Levi in 2024
- Born: Micaela Rachel Levi; February 1987 (age 39); Guildford, England
- Occupations: Composer; producer; singer; songwriter
- Musical career
- Origin: London, England
- Genres: Experimental pop; noise pop; classical; electronic; film music
- Instruments: Viola; vocals; guitar; electronics; found objects
- Years active: 2006–present
- Labels: Rough Trade; Milan; Accidental; Slip; Curl; World Music; Hyperdub
- Member of: Good Sad Happy Bad

Micaela Rachel Levi (born February 1987), previously known by the pseudonym Micachu, is an English musician, composer, producer, singer, and songwriter.

Levi studied composition at the Guildhall School of Music and Drama, but left without a degree when their experimental pop band Micachu and the Shapes began to achieve early success. Their debut album Jewellery (2009) received enthusiastic reviews and was followed by several more studio albums, with the group changing their name to Good Sad Happy Bad in 2016. Levi has also released solo projects under both the Micachu moniker and their given name, and has frequently collaborated with other artists, including Kwes and Tirzah.

In the early 2010s, Levi made their debut as a film composer, creating the widely praised score for Jonathan Glazer's film Under the Skin (2013). Levi received a European Film Award for Best Composer and a BAFTA Award for Best Film Music nomination, and won multiple other awards for this first movie composition. Levi then collaborated again with Glazer on his next film, the acclaimed The Zone of Interest (2023) (for which they won the Soundtrack Award at the 2023 Cannes Film Festival), and two short films. In 2017, Levi received their first Academy Awards nomination for Pablo Larraín's Jackie (2016). They also worked with director Steve McQueen on his Small Axe anthology film series.

== Early life ==
"My granddad played violin, so I think I thought there was prestige in it. [...] He escaped from prison with his violin in the Second World War. He was a German Jew, and he was arrested, but he escaped and hid out on a farm nearby. He decided the best time to ski across to neutral territory would be New Year’s Eve, because the guards would be drunk. But he left his violin at the farm, and years later he went back to get it. [...] I think I had a certain amount of obsession with it as a child."

— Levi about music and their family history

Micaela Rachel Levi, known as Mica Levi or Micachu, was born in 1987 in Guildford, Surrey, England and grew up in Watford, near London. Levi is of Ashkenazi Jewish descent; their grandfather was a German Jewish violinist who managed to escape from the Nazis during World War II and fled to the United Kingdom. Levi was raised in a musical household. Their father, Erik Levi, is a respected music scholar — the director of performance at Royal Holloway which is part of the University of London and an expert on music in the Third Reich — besides being a pianist. Their mother, meanwhile, was a cello teacher. Levi has a sister, Francesca, who is a video artist and has worked with them on various art projects.

Levi began learning the violin at the age of four and also learned to play the viola as a child. They then won a scholarship place at the prestigious Purcell School for Young Musicians at the age of nine and studied composition at the Guildhall School of Music and Drama in London from 2006 to 2009. There, they started an experimental pop band with two friends, keyboardist Raisa Khan and drummer Marc Pell, called Micachu and the Shapes. The name Micachu was a Pokémon reference. They quickly took off, and Levi never finished their composition degree. Performing as a DJ, they also released a mixtape titled Filthy Friends, which was posted on their official Myspace page.

== Music career ==
=== Micachu and the Shapes/Good Sad Happy Bad ===
After dropping out of university, Micachu and the Shapes signed to Matthew Herbert and Accidental Records. With the Shapes, Levi's focus was experimental pop music. Most of the music prominently featured an acoustic half-guitar with various non-standard tunings, extensive distortion, and use of noise and found-object elements, as well as occasionally unusual time signatures. Despite these experimental leanings, the artist categorizes their output with the Shapes as "pop music." Their debut album, Jewellery was recorded around Levi's composition studies at Guildhall School. In the wake of growing buzz, Micachu and the Shapes were signed to Rough Trade, which released Jewellery on 9 March 2009 to critical praise. The band performed with the London Sinfonietta at Kings Place, London, in May 2010, and in March 2011 released the live recording as the album Chopped and Screwed. The follow-up to their debut, Never, was released on 23 July 2012. The band then released the album Good Sad Happy Bad on 11 September 2015.

In March 2016, the band announced on social media that they were changing their name to Good Sad Happy Bad. The band then expanded to a four-piece, adding multi-instrumentalist and producer CJ Calderwood and Raisa Khan becoming the band's lead vocalist.

In September 2020, the band announced their return with a new single, "Shades". The track served as the title track to Shades, the band's fourth studio album and first under the name Good Sad Happy Bad. It was released on 16 October 2020 via Textile Records. Their fifth album, All Kinds of Days, was released on 8 November 2024.

=== As a film composer ===
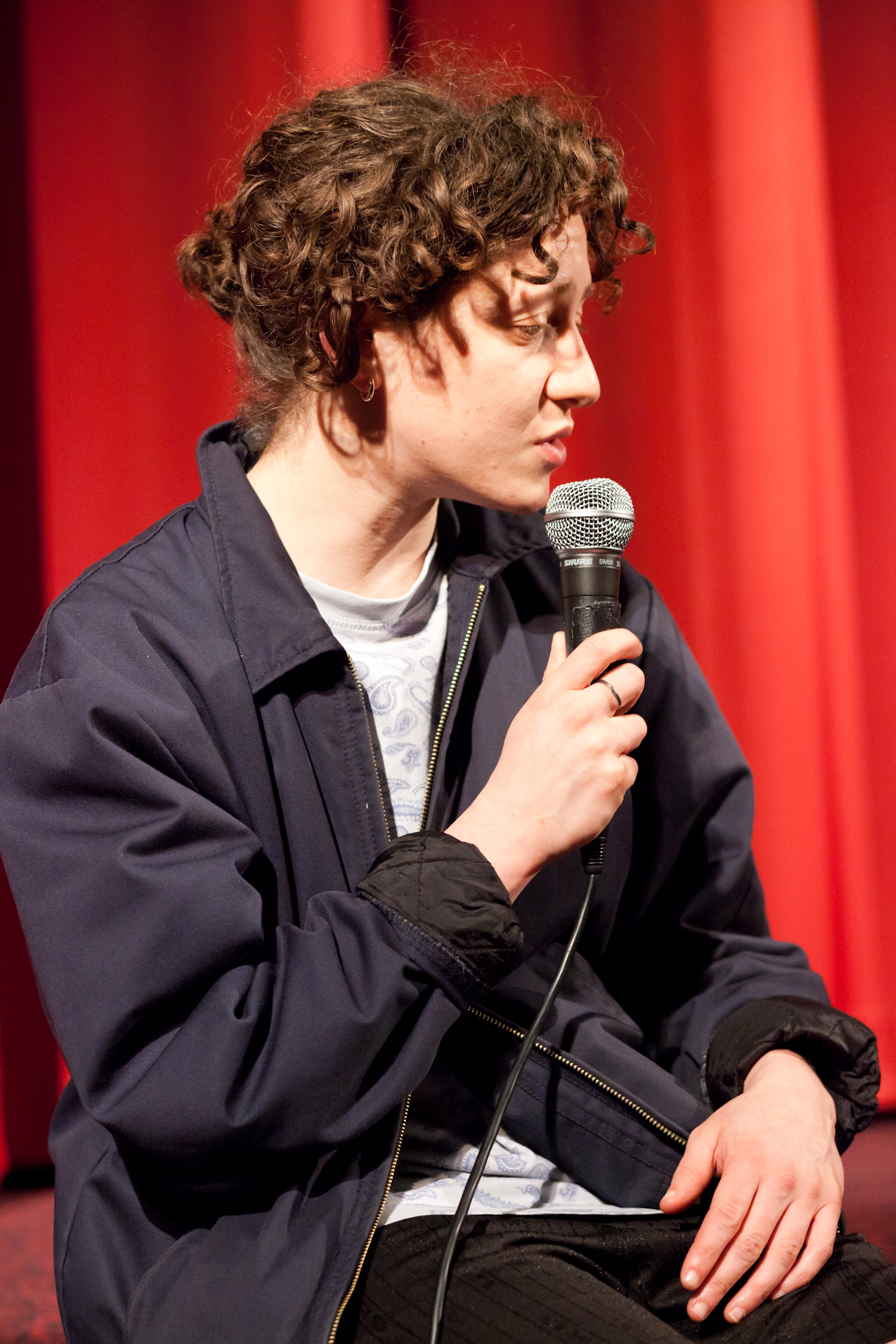
Levi in 2014

Levi's first major film score was for Jonathan Glazer's 2013 film Under the Skin. The film is based on the novel of the same name by Michel Faber and stars Scarlett Johansson. Produced at age 26 and created in collaboration with Glazer, Levi's film score themes are so tightly woven into the film that they give a symbiotic quality, in which the aural feels inseparable from the visual. The score was widely acclaimed for pushing the boundaries of music and sound design and Levi was nominated for multiple awards. They won Best Composer at the 2014 European Film Awards, and tied with Jonny Greenwood for Best Music/Score at the 2014 Los Angeles Film Critics Awards. They were also nominated for the 2015 BAFTA Award for Best Film Music.

They reunited with Glazer to write the scores for two short films, The Fall (2019) and Strasbourg 1518 (2020). In 2023, Levi composed the score for Glazer's fourth feature film The Zone of Interest. It won the Soundtrack Award at the 2023 Cannes Film Festival.

In 2016, Levi completed their second major film score, for Pablo Larraín's Jacqueline Kennedy Onassis biopic Jackie. Larraín had been a juror at the 2013 Venice Film Festival, and thought that Under the Skin deserved a film score prize. Composer Ryuichi Sakamoto, also on the jury, was enthralled by Levi's bold score for the film, and he and Larraín spoke passionately of their accomplishment, which led to the collaboration on Jackie. Levi was nominated for Best Original Score at the 89th Academy Awards but lost to Justin Hurwitz for La La Land.

In 2017, Levi worked with their sister, director Francesca Levi, on the soundtrack to The Colour of Chips, an experimental film conceived with Colm McAuliffe as part of The Unfilmables project, produced by Live Cinema UK. That same year, Levi scored the science-fiction film Marjorie Prime and, in association with musicians Demdike Stare and Gruff Rhys, contributed to the soundtrack for artist Phil Collins' Ceremony: The Return of Friedrich Engels which was screened at the Manchester International Festival and then broadcast by the BBC. In 2019, Levi composed the soundtrack for Colombian director Alejandro Landes's Monos. In December of that year it was announced they would be writing the score for the dark-comedy thriller film Zola which premiered at the Sundance Film Festival in 2020.

Later that same year, Levi composed the score for Mangrove, the first, feature-length episode of Steve McQueen's Small Axe series for the BBC and Amazon Studios.

=== Musical collaborations ===
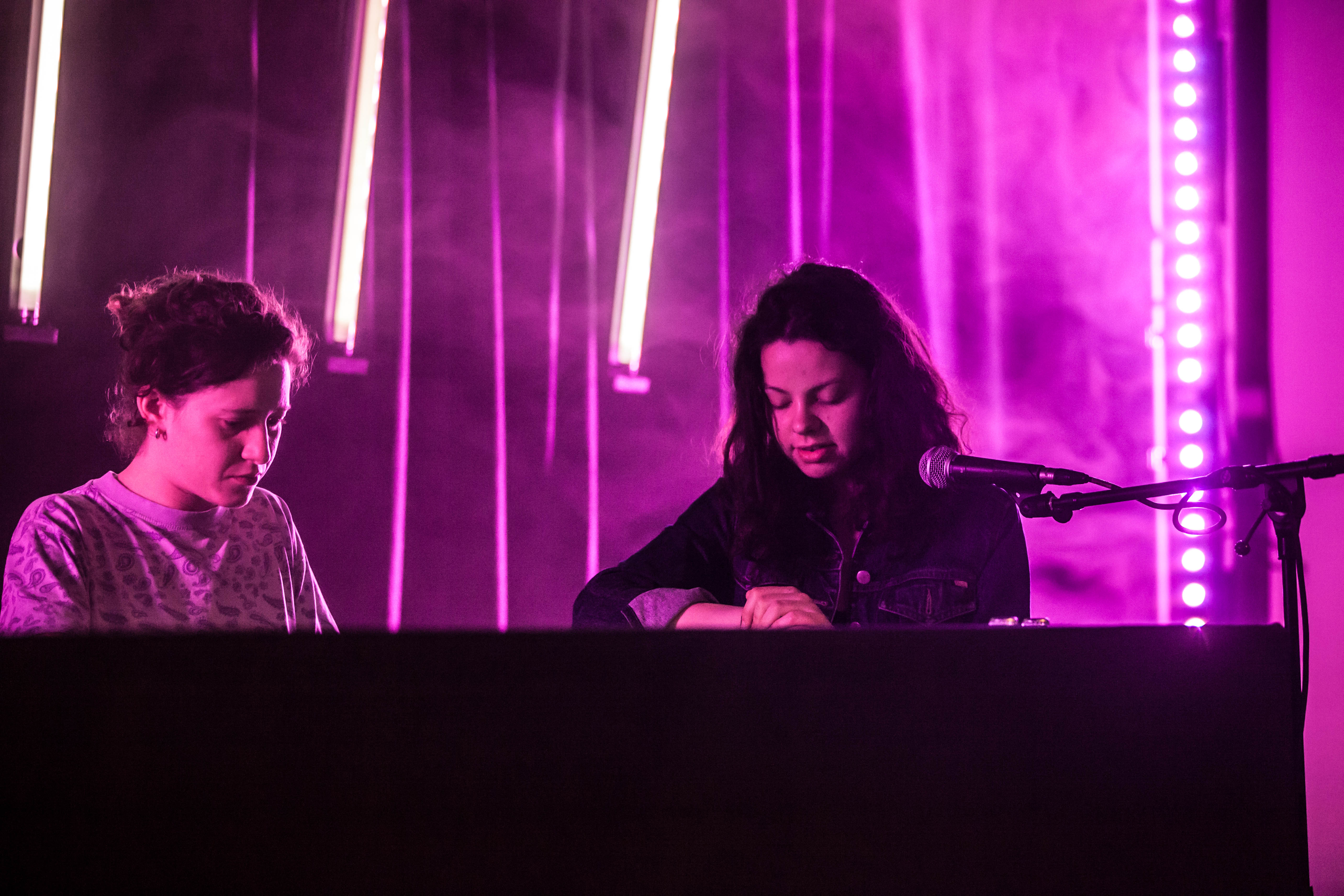
Levi (left) and Tirzah in 2014

Levi is also known for their various collaborations with English singer and songwriter Tirzah, a close friend they met at Purcell. Levi notably produced the Devotion (2018), Colourgrade (2021) and Trip9love (2023) albums.

Levi also released Remain Calm (2016), a collaborative album with cellist Oliver Coates.

=== Solo works ===
In 2021, Levi released their solo debut album Ruff Dog.

== Personal life ==
Besides their musical learning, Levi played a lot of football as a child and even turned up on the first day at Purcell in a football uniform with shin guards: "I played midfield, although now I think I’d be a striker." In 2016, Levi told in an interview that Bernard Herrmann is their favourite film composer, Bruce Langhorne's work for The Hired Hand their favourite film score of all time and Cliff Martinez's score for Spring Breakers their favourite recent film score.

They came out as non-binary in 2020.

== List of film scores ==
=== Feature films ===
Year	Title	Director
2013	Under the Skin	Jonathan Glazer
2016	Jackie	Pablo Larrain
2017	Marjorie Prime	Michael Almereyda
2019	Monos	Alejandro Landes
2020	Zola	Janicza Bravo
2023	The Zone of Interest	Jonathan Glazer

=== Short films ===
Year	Title	Director(s)
2016	Delete Beach	Phil Collins; Marisuke Eguchi
2019	The Fall	Jonathan Glazer
2020	Strasbourg 1518	Jonathan Glazer

=== Television ===
Year	Title	Director	Notes
2017	Ceremony: The Return of Friedrich Engels	Phil Collins	In association with Demdike Stare and Gruff Rhys
2020	Mangrove	Steve McQueen	Small Axe anthology
2020	Lovers Rock	Steve McQueen	Small Axe anthology

== Discography ==
=== Studio albums ===
Year	Album details
2014	Under The Skin (OST): Released: 28 March 2014; Label: Rough Trade, Warner, Milan; Formats: CD, Digital download, LP
2016	Remain Calm (with Oliver Coates): Released: 25 November 2016; Label: Slip; Formats: CD, Digital download, LP
2016	Jackie (OST): Released: 16 December 2016; Label: Milan; Formats: CD, Digital download, LP
2018	Slow Dark Green Murky Waterfall (with Eliza McCarthy): Released: 24 October 2018; Label: Slip; Format: EP
2019	Monos (OST): Released: 30 August 2019; Label: Invada, Lakeshore; Formats: CD, Digital download, LP
2020	Ruff Dog: Released: 16 December 2020; Label: Self-released; Formats: Digital download, LP
2021	Blue Alibi: Released: 27 January 2021; Label: Self-released; Formats: Digital download, LP
2021	Zola (OST): Released: 1 July 2021; Label: Invada; Formats: Digital download, LP

=== Mixtapes ===
Year	Mixtape details
2009	Filthy Friends: Released: 9 February 2009; Label: Self-released; Formats: CD, Digital download
2010	Kwesachu Mixtape Vol.1 with Kwes.: Released: 5 June 2009; Label: Self-released; Formats: Cassette Tape, Digital download
2011	Meat Batch with Kwake Bass: Released: 22 March 2011; Label: For BTS Radio; Formats: Digital download
2011	Chopped & Screwed Mixtape with Brother May: Released: 2011; Label: Self-released; Formats: Digital download
2012	Kwesachu Vol. 2 with Kwes.: Released: 30 April 2012; Label: Self-released; Formats: Cassette Tape, Digital download
2014	Feeling Romantic Feeling Tropical Feeling Ill: Released: 27 November 2014; Label: Self-released (Demdike Stare Self-Released); Formats: Cassette Tape, Digital download

=== Singles / EPs ===
- "Taz and May Vids" (2016) (with Tirzah and Brother May)
- "Clothes Wear Me" (2016) (with KEVIN)
- "Delete Beach" (2017)
- "Obviously" (2018) (with Tirzah as Taz & Meeks)
- "Skunk Boy." (2022)
- "slob air" (2024)

=== Production ===
Year	Artist	Title	Album	Label	Credit
2023	Tirzah	all tracks	Trip9love (LP)	Domino	Production
2021	Arca	"Muñecas"	Kick II (LP)	XL	Co-production with Arca
2021	Tirzah	all tracks	Colourgrade (LP)	Domino	Production, co-mixing with Kwes
2019	Wiki	'Dame Aquí (feat. Princess Nokia)'	Oofie (LP)	Wikset	Co-production with Alex Epton, Rob Mack and Tony Seltzer
2019	Mica Levi	all tracks	Monos (OST, LP)	Invada, Lakeshore	Composer, production
2019	Brother May	all tracks	Aura Type Orange (LP)	self-released	Production on all tracks; co-production on 'Reppin' with Rob McCormack and 'Backpack Melody' with Coby Sey
2018	Tirzah	all tracks	Devotion (LP)	Domino	Production, co-mixing with Kwes
2018	Taz & Meeks	'Obviously'	Taz & Meeks / Brother May / Coby Sey (Compilation EP); Curl Compilation (Compilation LP)	Curl	Production
2017	Mica Levi	all tracks	Delete Beach (Single)	DDS	Production
2016	Mica Levi	all tracks	Jackie (OST, LP)	Milan	Composer, production
2016	Mica Levi & Oliver Coates	all tracks	Remain Calm (LP)	Slip	co-production with Oliver Coates
2016	Good Sad Happy Bad	all tracks	Mash One / Looking Up at the Sun (Single)	self-released	co-production as part of Good Sad Happy Bad
2016	Brother May	all tracks	May & Meeks (EP)	Curl	Production on all tracks, mixing
2016	Micachu	all tracks	Taz & May Vids (EP)	DDS	Production on all tracks, mixing
2015	Wiki	'Cherry Tree'	Lil Me (Mixtape)	Letter Racer	Co-production with Sporting Life
2015	Tirzah	all tracks	Make It Up (Single)	Greco Roman	Production
2014	DELS	'RGB'	Petals Have Fallen (LP)	Big Dada	Production
2014	Micachu	all tracks	Feeling Romantic Feeling Tropical Feeling Ill (Mixtape)	DDS	Composer, production
2014	Micachu and the Shapes	all tracks	Good Sad Happy Bad (LP)	Rough Trade	co-production as part of Micachu and the Shapes
2014	Tirzah	all tracks	No Romance (EP)	Greco Roman	Production
2014	Mica Levi	all tracks	Under the Skin (OST, LP)	Rough Trade, Milan	Production
2013	Tirzah	all tracks	I'm Not Dancing (EP)	Greco Roman	Production
2012	Micachu and the Shapes	all tracks	Never (LP)	Rough Trade	co-production as part of Micachu and the Shapes
2012	Kwesachu	all tracks	Kwesachu Vol. 2 (Mixtape)	self-released	Production with Kwes
2011	DELS	'Violina', 'Melting Patterns'	Gob (LP)	Big Dada	Production
2011	Micachu hosted by Brother May	all tracks	Chopped & Screwed Mixtape (Mixtape)	self-released	Production
2011	Micachu & Kwake Bass	all tracks	Meat Batch (Mixtape)	BTS Radio	Production
2010	Micachu & the Shapes with the London Sinfonietta	all tracks	Chopped & Screwed (LP)	Remote Control and Rough Trade	co-production as part of Micachu and the Shapes
2009	Kwesachu	most tracks including 'Closer (cover of Ne-Yo's song) ft. Romy of The xx'	Kwesachu Mixtape Vol.1 (Mixtape)	self-released	Production with Kwes
2009	Micachu and the Shapes	all tracks	Jewellery (LP)	Rough Trade	co-production as part of Micachu and the Shapes w/ Matthew Herbert
2009	Micachu	most tracks	Filthy Friends (Mixtape)	self-released	Production

=== As featured artist ===
- Speech Debelle – "Better Days" (2009)
- Baker Trouble – "Fine" (2010)
- Babyfather – "God Hour" (2016)
- Arca - "Think Of" and "Baby Doll" (2016)
- Mount Kimbie – "Marilyn" (2017)
- Stubborn – "Mid" (2020)
- bar italia – "letting go makes it stay" (2021)

== Awards and recognition ==
Year	Awards	Category	Nominated work	Result	Ref.
2013	British Independent Film Awards	Best Technical Achievement	Under the Skin	Nominated	
2014	British Academy Film Awards	Best Original Music	Under the Skin	Nominated	
2014	Chicago Film Critics Association Awards	Best Original Score	Under the Skin	Won	
2014	European Film Awards	Best Composer	Under the Skin	Won	
2014	London Film Critics Circle Awards	Technical Achievement Award	Under the Skin	Won	
2014	Los Angeles Film Critics Association Awards	Best Original Score	Under the Skin	Won	
2014	Washington D.C. Area Film Critics Association Awards	Best Original Score	Under the Skin	Won	
2015	ASCAP Film and Television Music Awards	Best Film Score	Under the Skin	Nominated	
2016	Academy Awards	Best Original Score	Jackie	Nominated	
2016	Austin Film Critics Association Awards	Best Score	Jackie	Nominated	
2016	Boston Society of Film Critics Awards	Best Use of Music in a Film	Jackie	Won	
2016	British Academy Film Awards	Best Original Music	Jackie	Nominated	
2016	Chicago Film Critics Association Awards	Best Original Score	Jackie	Won	
2016	Critics' Choice Movie Awards	Best Score	Jackie	Nominated	
2016	Dallas–Fort Worth Film Critics Association Awards	Best Musical Score	Jackie	2nd Place	
2016	Hollywood Music in Media Awards	Best Original Score – Feature Film	Jackie	Nominated	
2016	Houston Film Critics Society Awards	Best Original Score	Jackie	Nominated	
2016	London Film Critics Circle Awards	Technical Achievement Award	Jackie	Nominated	
2016	Los Angeles Film Critics Association Awards	Best Music	Jackie	Runner-up	
2016	Washington D.C. Area Film Critics Association Awards	Best Score	Jackie	Nominated	
2020	Platino Awards	Best Original Score	Monos	Nominated	
2020	Los Angeles Film Critics Association Awards	Best Music	Lovers Rock	Runner-up	
2023	Cannes Film Festival	Soundtrack Award	The Zone of Interest	Won	

== See also ==
- List of Academy Award winners and nominees from Great Britain
