= Under the Skin (2013 film) =

Science fiction film by Jonathan Glazer

- Theatrical release poster
- Directed by: Jonathan Glazer
- Screenplay by: Walter Campbell; Jonathan Glazer
- Based on: Under the Skin by Michel Faber
- Produced by: James Wilson; Nick Wechsler
- Starring: Scarlett Johansson
- Cinematography: Daniel Landin
- Edited by: Paul Watts
- Music by: Mica Levi
- Production companies: BFI; Film4; Silver Reel; Creative Scotland; JW Films; FilmNation Entertainment
- Distributed by: StudioCanal (United Kingdom); Ascot Elite (Switzerland); A24 (United States)
- Release dates: 29 August 2013 (Telluride); 14 March 2014 (United Kingdom); 4 April 2014 (United States); 23 July 2014 (Switzerland)
- Running time: 108 minutes
- Countries: United Kingdom; United States; Switzerland
- Language: English
- Budget: £8 million ($13.3 million)
- Box office: $9.1 million

Under the Skin is a 2013 science fiction film directed by Jonathan Glazer and written by Glazer and Walter Campbell, based on the 2000 novel by Michel Faber. It stars Scarlett Johansson as an extraterrestrial disguised as a human who preys on lone men in the evening hours in Scotland.

Glazer developed Under the Skin for over a decade. He and Campbell pared it back from an elaborate, effects-heavy concept to a sparse story focusing on an alien perspective of the human condition. Most of the cast had no acting experience, and many scenes were filmed with hidden cameras. The film premiered at the Telluride Film Festival on 29 August 2013. It was released in the United Kingdom on 14 March 2014, and in other territories later in the year. It was a box-office failure, grossing $9.1 million on a budget of $13.3 million.

Under the Skin was acclaimed for Glazer's direction, Johansson's performance, Landin's cinematography, and Mica Levi's score. It received numerous accolades and awards, was named the best film of the year by various critics and publications, appeared on many best-of-the-decade lists, and was ranked 61st on the BBC's 100 Greatest Films of the 21st Century list. In 2025, Rolling Stone and The New York Times named it among the best films of the 21st century.

== Plot ==
In Glasgow, a motorcyclist retrieves an inert young woman from the roadside and places her in the back of a van, where a naked woman dons her clothes. After buying clothes and make-up at a shopping centre, the woman drives the van from town to town, picking up single men with few friends. She lures a man into a dilapidated house. As he undresses, following the woman into a void, he is submerged in a liquid abyss.

At a beach, the woman attempts to pick up a swimmer, but is interrupted by the cries of a drowning couple attempting to rescue their dog, as it is pulled out to sea. The swimmer rescues the husband, but the husband rushes back into the water to save his wife and both drown. As the swimmer lies exhausted on the beach, the woman strikes his head with a rock, drags him to the van, and drives away, ignoring the couple's distraught baby. The motorcyclist retrieves the swimmer's belongings, ignoring the baby crying on the beach.

The woman visits a nightclub and picks up another man. At the house, he follows her into the void and is submerged in the liquid. Suspended beneath the surface, he sees the swimmer floating naked beside him, alive but bloated and immobile. When he reaches to touch him, the swimmer's body collapses, leaving only his empty skin floating in the liquid as a red mass empties through a trough.

The next day, the woman receives a rose from a street vendor, purchased by another man in traffic. She listens to a radio report about the missing family from the beach. The woman enters a dark room and is examined by the motorcyclist. She seduces a lonely man with facial tumours but lets him leave after examining herself in a mirror. The motorcyclist intercepts the man and bundles him into a car, then sets out in pursuit of the woman.

In the Scottish Highlands, the woman abandons the van in the fog. She walks to a restaurant and attempts to eat cake, but retches and spits it out. On a bus, she meets a man who offers to help her. At his house, he prepares a meal for her and they watch television. Alone in her room, she examines her body in a mirror. They visit a ruined castle, where the man carries her over a puddle and helps her down some steps. At his house, they kiss and begin to have sex, but the woman stops and examines her genitals.

Wandering in a forest, the woman meets a commercial logger and shelters in a bothy. She wakes up to find the logger molesting her. She runs into the wilderness but he catches and attempts to rape her. He tears her skin, revealing a featureless body. As the woman extricates herself from her skin, the man douses her in fuel and burns her alive. The motorcyclist looks out across a snowy field.

== Cast ==
- Scarlett Johansson as the Female
  - Jessica Mance portrays the Female in her alien form
- Jeremy McWilliams as the Bad Man
- Lynsey Taylor Mackay as the Dead Woman
- Dougie McConnell as Pick-Up Man
- Kevin McAlinden as First Victim
- Kryštof Hádek as the Swimmer
- Roy Armstrong as Father at Beach
- Alison Chand as Mother at Beach
- Joe Szula as Man at Club
- Paul Brannigan as Andrew
- Scott Dymond as the Nervous Man
- Adam Pearson as the Deformed Man
- Dave Acton as the Logger

== Themes ==
Writing for the Milwaukee Journal Sentinel, Duane Dudek speculated that Johansson's character assumes a human identity to collect information about humans as an alien intelligence might, inducing an identity crisis causing her to "spin out of control like a broken machine". He wrote that the motorcyclist can be interpreted as a companion, enabler, or pursuer, and that the "tar-dark world" where the woman submerges her victims may be a nest, a web, another planet or dimension, or a visual representation of how sex feels to her or them. In the Guardian, Leo Robson wrote that Under the Skin deals with race and immigration. He interpreted Johansson's character as a "kind of immigrant", and that the film's title "seems like part of an anti-racial slogan, a reminder that despite our racial or ethnic differences we share some basic components".

Critics highlighted the exploration of empathy as a defining human capacity, with Johansson's character coming to share in this over the course of the film. Noting that a turning point occurs during Johansson's character's encounter with the man with facial tumours (played by Adam Pearson), the philosopher Colin Heber-Percy wrote: "The film suggests it is our very weakness which we value, which makes us us. [...] [The alien] recognises herself in the world, in the middle of things; she recognises herself as subject among subjects. In short, she chooses (or cannot fail to choose) to become human, to empathise, to be weak as flesh." The lecturer Maureen Foster, who highlights Johansson's character's examination of herself in the mirror before releasing Pearson's character, writes that the film presents empathy as "a definition for what is human", with the alien discovering "something in herself that was either lost or had never been there in the first place."

Though Glazer said he wanted to make a film "more about a human experience than a gender experience", several critics identified feminist and gender themes. The Economist wrote that "there is some aggressive sexuality in the film: women seem very vulnerable but then men's desires are punished". In The Mary Sue, Kristy Puchko wrote that Under the Skin "creates a reverse of contemporary rape culture where violence against women is so common that women are casually warned to be ever alert for those who might harm them ... By and large men don't worry about their safety in the same way when walking home late at night. But in the world of Under the Skin, they absolutely should."

Robson wrote that Johansson's character is "both a watcher and predator of men. In the society she enters, and to which she brings nothing besides a body, [she] is a sex object, in dress and demeanour a kind of sex toy; she might have come to Earth to prove a point about male expectations of women ... If Under the Skin communicates any gender-politics message, it does so through the disparity in excitement between the male characters' reaction to [Johansson] and that of the camera." The Atlantic journalist Noah Gittell noted how little hype Johansson's nude scenes attracted, despite her status as a Hollywood sex symbol, and wrote: "The way the film frames it — with Johansson having removed almost all of her personality from the character — it doesn't play as even remotely sexual, and the scene, remarkably, barely attracted any hype." The film is thought to be inspired by the Scottish folklore of Baobhan sith, female vampire-like creatures who prowl during the night preying on men.

== Production ==
=== Pre-production ===
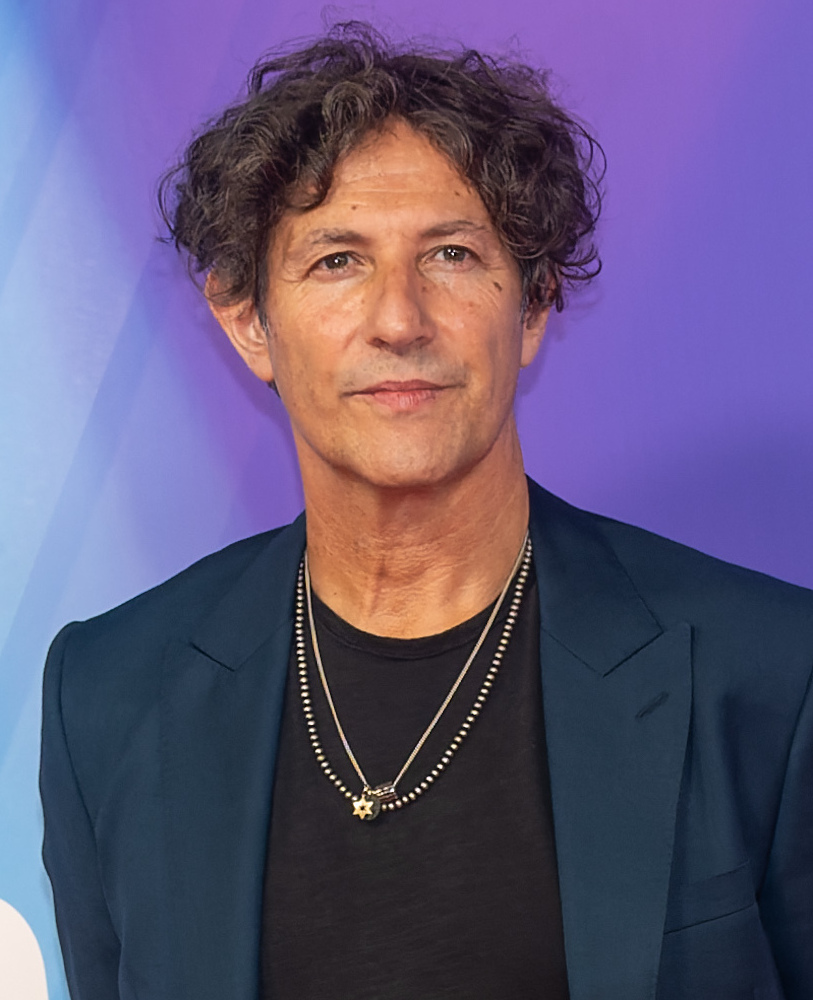
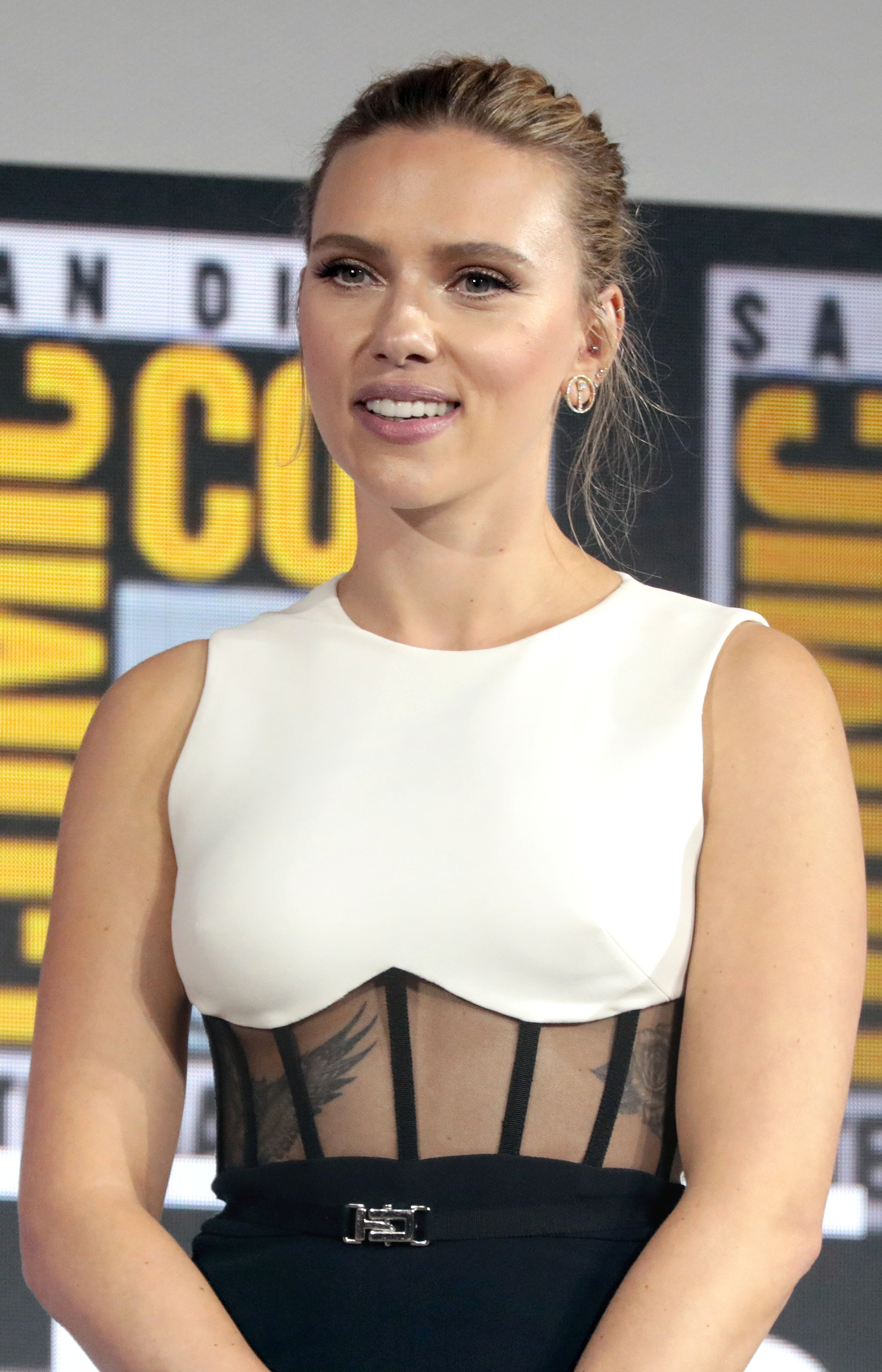
Writer/director Jonathan Glazer (left) and actress Scarlett Johansson

Director Jonathan Glazer decided to adapt Michel Faber's novel Under the Skin (2000) after finishing his debut film, Sexy Beast (2000), but work did not begin until he had finished his second film, Birth (2004). Glazer's producer James Wilson sent him a script that closely adapted the novel; Glazer admired the script but had no interest in filming it, saying: "I knew then that I absolutely didn't want to film the book. But I still wanted to make the book a film."

Glazer and co-writer Milo Addica, later replaced by Walter Campbell, spent several years writing and rewriting the story. They conceived an elaborate high-budget film, and produced a script about two aliens disguised as husband-and-wife farmers. Brad Pitt was cast as the husband, but progress was slow. Glazer eventually decided to make a film that represented an alien perspective of the human world and focused only on the female character. He and Campbell deleted every scene in their script that did not involve her and deleted the elaborate special effects sequences, a process Glazer likened to "a big, extravagant rock band turning into PJ Harvey". The film also removes the character names. Whereas the novel is explicit that the main character is an alien processing humans for meat, the film is more ambiguous.

Glazer shot commercials while the film was in pre-production, which he used to "sketch" ideas and test equipment. Under the Skin was jointly financed by Film4 Productions, the British Film Institute, Scottish Screen, Silver Reel, and FilmNation Entertainment. Glazer secured final backing after cutting the elaborate special effects scenes from the script.

=== Casting ===
Gemma Arterton, Eva Green, January Jones, Abbie Cornish and Olivia Wilde were considered for the lead. In 2015, Arterton said that she had been Glazer's first choice but the film had needed a bigger star to get funding. The role went to Scarlett Johansson, who remained committed to the project for four years before it was made. Johansson was known for her roles in blockbusters such as the Marvel Cinematic Universe films. Glazer said: "It made a great deal of sense to cast somebody very well known out of context. I remember seeing her walking along the street in a pink jumper on a long lens and she looks like an exotic insect on the wrong continent." Despite her fame, Johansson was rarely recognised, as members of the public did not believe it could be her. For the role, she learnt to drive a van and mastered an English accent.

Jeremy McWilliams, a championship road racer, was cast as the film required a skillful motorcyclist who could ride through the Scottish Highlands at high speeds in bad weather. The logger was played by the owner of a location researched for the film. For the man with disfigurement, Glazer did not want to use prosthetics; the production team contacted the charity Changing Faces, which supports people with facial disfigurements. The role went to Adam Pearson, who has neurofibromatosis and had worked in television production. Pearson's suggestions about how Johansson's character could lure his character were used in the script.

=== Filming ===
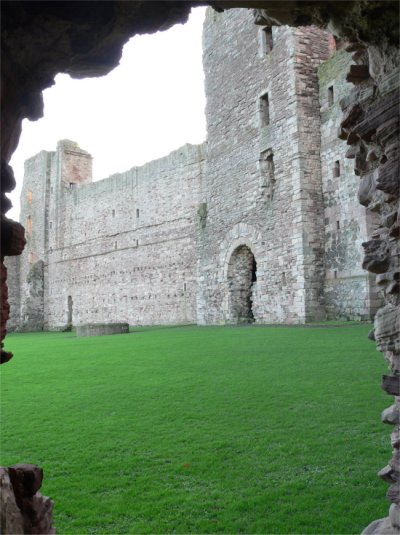
Parts of Under the Skin were shot at Tantallon Castle in East Lothian, Scotland.

As Glazer wanted the film to feel realistic, most characters were played by actors with no experience. Many scenes, such as those set in the nightclub and shopping centre, and the scenes in which Johansson's character picks up men in the van, were unscripted sequences filmed with hidden cameras. Afterwards, the production team informed the subjects that they had been filmed and asked permission to use the footage. Glazer said the men were "talked through what extremes they would have to go to if they agreed to take part in the film once they understood what we were doing".

The crew built their own cameras to shoot some scenes. Johansson drove the van with the crew inside, and towed a trailer containing a generator for their equipment. To create the black room in which her character traps men, the crew built a set with a reflective floor, blackout and custom lighting. The men were filmed walking into a pool whose floor sank as they walked, submerging them. The scenes were finished with computer graphics.

Filming locations included Argyle Street, Glasgow, Buchanan Galleries, Auchmithie Beach, Arbroath, Almondvale, Livingston, Loch Restil and Lochgoilhead, Cairndow, Wanlockhead, Dumfries & Galloway, Tantallon Castle, North Berwick, Port Glasgow, Wishaw, Kilsyth and the vicinity of Celtic Park.

== Soundtrack ==
Under the Skin's soundtrack was composed by Mica Levi and produced by Peter Raeburn. The soundtrack is minimalistic, mostly recorded using viola, accompanied by strings, percussion and other instruments. The album was released on 28 March 2014 by Rough Trade Records, and received positive response with several websites and publications called it as "one of the best musical scores".

== Release ==
Under the Skin screened for the first time on 29 August 2013 at the Telluride Film Festival. It had its official world premiere at the 70th Venice International Film Festival on 3 September 2013, and screened on 9 September 2013 at the 2013 Toronto International Film Festival. It was released in the United Kingdom on 14 March 2014 and the United States on 4 April 2014. In January 2020, Deadline reported that a television series based on the film was in development.

=== Home video ===
The film was released on DVD and Blu-ray on 15 July 2014. Alongside the UK Blu-ray release, StudioCanal also issued a limited-edition Blu-ray SteelBook exclusively through Zavvi.

In France, Diaphana released the film on Blu-ray on 28 January 2019. The release included a 13-minute introduction by Olivier Père of ARTE France Cinéma, approximately 28 minutes of interviews with the production team, and the trailer.

== Reception ==
=== Box office ===
Under the Skin was a box-office failure. With a production budget of $13.3 million, it grossed $2.6 million in the US and Canada and $6.5 million in other countries for a worldwide total of $9.1 million. In the United States, it opened with $140,000 in four theatres; despite earning the highest per-theatre average of all films playing that weekend, above Captain America: The Winter Soldier (which also stars Johansson), it failed to make the list of top-grossing films in the US speciality box office. In the UK, Under the Skin opened with a gross of £239,000. According to Guardian writer Phil Hoad, the Under the Skin budget was in "the danger zone: not in the ultra-low bracket that can make a sharply executed future vision ultra-profitable ... [nor] the $30m-plus range where marketing begins to snag mass audiences".

=== Critical response ===
On the review aggregator website Rotten Tomatoes, 84% of 261 critics' reviews are positive, with an average rating of 7.9/10. The website's consensus reads: "Its message may prove elusive for some, but with absorbing imagery and a mesmerizing performance from Scarlett Johansson, Under the Skin is a haunting viewing experience." Metacritic, which uses a weighted average, assigned the film a score of 83 out of 100, based on 48 critics, indicating "universal acclaim".

Xan Brooks of The Guardian gave Under the Skin five out of five and called it "far and away the best picture" to play at the Venice Film Festival. Peter Bradshaw, also of The Guardian, described the film as "visually stunning and deeply disturbing" and also awarded it five out of five. Robbie Collin of The Telegraph wrote: "If my legs hadn't been so wobbly and my mouth so dry, I would have climbed up on my seat and cheered." Matt Zoller Seitz of RogerEbert.com gave the film four out of four, describing it as "hideously beautiful ... its life force is overwhelming." Richard Roeper of Chicago Sun-Times gave the film four out of four, stating: "This is what we talk about when we talk about film as art." Christy Lemire also gave the film four out of four, calling it an "undeniably haunting, singular experience" and naming it one of the best films of 2014. Andrew Lowry of Total Film, Dave Calhoun of Time Out London, Kate Muir of The Times, and Robbie Collin of The Daily Telegraph all gave the film five out of five.

However, Todd McCarthy of The Hollywood Reporter wrote: "The film provides too little for even relatively adventurous specialised audiences to latch onto." Kaleem Aftab of The Independent stated that "Glazer simply gave up on trying to find a cohesive story." Henry Fitzherbert of The Daily Express awarded the film two out of five and wrote: "It didn't get under my skin, just on my nerves."

Under the Skin was named the best film of 2014 by numerous critics and publications, and was included in many best-of-the-decade lists. In France, the prestigious Cahiers du Cinéma ranked Under the Skin third on its 2014 top ten chart (behind P'tit Quinquin and Goodbye to Language). The same magazine ranked Under the Skin ninth on its 2010s chart. In 2015, The Guardian named it one of the top 50 films of the decade so far. It received multiple accolades, including the London Film Critics Circle Award for British Film of the Year and the European Film Award for Best Soundtrack. In 2016, it was ranked 61st on the BBC's 100 Greatest Films of the 21st Century, an international poll of 177 top critics. In 2019, it was ranked the fourth-best film since 2000 by the critics of The Guardian. IndieWire listed it as one of "25 great films that bombed at the box office" and the third-best science fiction film of the 21st century in 2023. In 2019, Pitchfork named the score the second-best of all time. In 2023, Under the Skin was named the second-best horror film of the 21st century by Slant Magazine and the 58th-greatest film of all time by Time Out. In January 2024, Rolling Stone ranked it number 6 on its inaugural list of "The 150 Best Sci-Fi Movies of All Time". On The Sight and Sound Greatest Films of All Time 2022 list, Under the Skin was tied for 169th. Filmmakers Denis Villeneuve and Sofia Coppola cited the film as among the best of the 21st century. In June 2025, it ranked number 69 on The New York Times' list of "The 100 Best Movies of the 21st Century" and was one of the films voted for the "Readers' Choice" edition of the list, finishing at number 153. In July 2025, it ranked number 45 on Rolling Stone's list of "The 100 Best Movies of the 21st Century" and was ranked the "Best Horror Movie of the 21st Century" by The Hollywood Reporter.

=== Accolades ===
At the 68th British Academy Film Awards, Under the Skin was nominated for Outstanding British Film and Best Original Music. It was also nominated for a Critics' Choice Award, an Independent Spirit Award, and four British Independent Film Awards, among other accolades.
