= Hugo (album) =

Studio album by Loyle Carner
- Released: 21 October 2022
- Length: 34:05
- Label: AMF; Caroline; Virgin EMI
- Producer: Earl Saga; Kwes; Nick Mills; Jordan Rakei; Madlib; Rebel Kleff; Alfa Mist; Puma Blue; Zento; Loyle Carner

Loyle Carner chronology
Not Waving, but Drowning (2019)	Hugo (2022)	Hopefully! (2025)

Singles from Hugo
- 1. "Hate" Released: 4 July 2022; 2. "Georgetown" Released: 19 August 2022; 3. "Nobody Knows (Ladas Road)" Released: 13 September 2022

Hugo (stylised as hugo) is the third studio album by English hip hop artist Loyle Carner. It was released via Virgin EMI Records on 21 October 2022. The album was shortlisted for the 2023 Mercury Prize.

== Background ==
Three years passed between the release of Hugo and Carner's previous album, Not Waving, but Drowning. During this period he focussed on Chilli Con Carner, his cookery school for children with ADHD. His ongoing struggles with dyslexia and ADHD would inform the lyrical content of Hugo. He also released three singles in 2020: solo release "Yesterday," "I Wonder Why" with Joesef, and "Let It Go" with FARR and Flatbush Zombies producer Erick the Architect.

== Songs ==
Carner's first child, a boy, was born in late 2020. He stated a desire for his music to be a "a true representation of the facts" for his son to look back on, documenting Carner's life as a young, Black, artist dealing with issues from his past. As a result, the lyrical content of Hugo is largely autobiographical. The album was written during the lockdown prompted by the COVID-19 pandemic. He also considered the introspective tone of the album to be in part due to this "hedonistic side of career being stripped away. There were no shows, no backstage, no festivals, no photoshoots."

Carner was influenced by Kendrick Lamar, saying "When you're young, there's a charm to the fact that you're a bit naive. You don't know what you're striving for. It's a balance because you don't want to be too old to feel connected to the culture of youth that you're trying to speak to. There's a sweet spot in the middle, like Kendrick with To Pimp a Butterfly, where you're naive enough to still be free-speaking, but considered enough to refine your shit."

"Georgetown" was named after Carner's paternal grandmother's birthplace, and samples John Agard's poem "Half-Caste", which recounts the author's experiences of racism as a mixed race man in Britain. Issues of racism, and feeling separate from the Black community, are also present on "Hate". "Blood on my Nikes" recounts a murder Carner witnessed as a sixteen-year-old, and includes a speech on knife crime by teenage activist Athian Akec. Throughout the album he references his relationship with his estranged father, with whom he had recently developed a relationship, and whose recorded voice is sampled on several tracks.

== Critical reception ==
Professional ratings
Aggregate scores
Source	Rating
AnyDecentMusic?	7.8/10
Metacritic	87/100
Review scores
Source	Rating
DIY	4/5 stars
The Guardian	5/5 stars
NME	4/5 stars
The Line of Best Fit	9/10

Hugo was met with critical acclaim. At Metacritic, which assigns a normalized rating out of 100 to reviews from professional critics, the album received an average score of 87, based on 8 reviews. Writing in The Guardian, Damien Morris called the album a "beautiful, blistering masterpiece," praising the "intense" production and elements of jazz, as well as the subject matter. Fred Garratt-Stanley of the NME gave the album four stars out of five, named it Carner's "most polished record yet", singling out the production of Kwes for helping the rapper "move from dynamic, multi-syllabic storytelling to a more honest, reflective voice." Hayley Milross of The Line of Best Fit also praised the lyrical content, noting that the introspective themes "demonstrate some of Carner's finest and best work."

=== Year-end lists ===
Appearances on year-end lists for Hugo
Publication	List	Rank	Ref.
NME	NME's Albums of the Year 2022	26	
Gigwise	Gigwise's 51 Best Albums of 2022	38	
GQ	The best albums of 2022	—N/a	
Louder Than War	Louder Than War's Albums of the Year 2022	51	

== Track listing ==
Hugo track listing
No.	Title	Writer(s)	Producer(s)	Length
1.	"Hate"	Ben Coyle-Larner; Kwes; Matt McLuckie; Nick Mills; Richard Spaven	Earl Saga; Kwes; Nick Mills	4:04
2.	"Nobody Knows (Ladas Road)"	B. Coyle-Larner; Kwes; Morgan Simpson; Nick Mills; Thomas Lee Barrett	Kwes; Nick Mills	3:07
3.	"Georgetown" (featuring John Agard)	B. Coyle-Larner; Madlib; John Agard^{[a]}	Madlib	2:57
4.	"Speed of Plight"	B. Coyle-Larner; Jordan Rakei; Kwes; Rebel Kleff	Jordan Rakei; Kwes; Rebel Kleff	3:00
5.	"Homerton" (featuring JNR Williams and Olivia Dean)	B. Coyle-Larner; Alfa Mist; JNR Williams; Kwes; Richard Spaven; Rocco Palladino; Sheila Maurice-Grey	Alfa Mist; Kwes	2:49
6.	"Blood On My Nikes" (featuring Wesley Joseph and Athian Akec)	B. Coyle-Larner; Alfa Mist; Jordan Rakei; Kwes; Nick Mills; Richard Spaven; Rocco Palladino	Alfa Mist; Kwes; Jordan Rakei	3:37
7.	"Plastic"	B. Coyle-Larner; Alfa Mist; Kwes; Richard Spaven; Rocco Palladino	Alfa Mist; Kwes	3:29
8.	"A Lasting Place"	B. Coyle-Larner; Harvey Grant; Kwes; Puma Blue; Gabriel Stebbing^{[b]}	Kwes; Puma Blue	4:22
9.	"Polyfilla"	B. Coyle-Larner; Jordan Rakei; Kwes	Jordan Rakei; Kwes	3:13
10.	"HGU"	B. Coyle-Larner; Zento	B. Coyle-Larner; Kwes; Nick Mills; Zento	3:21
Total length:				34:05

Sample credits

- "Hate" contains a sample of the recording "The Sun One" performed by Sun Ra.
- "Nobody Knows (Ladas Road)" contains a sample of the recording "Nobody Knows" performed by Pastor T. L. Barrett and The Youth For Christ Choir.
- ^{^[a]}"Georgetown" contains elements of the poem "Half-Caste" written and read by John Agard.
- ^{^[b]}"A Lasting Place" contains elements of the song "I Tried So Hard" by Gabriel Stebbing.

== Charts ==
Chart performance for Hugo
Chart (2022)	Peak position
Belgian Albums (Ultratop Flanders)	27
Belgian Albums (Ultratop Wallonia)	126
Dutch Albums (Album Top 100)	42
German Albums (Offizielle Top 100)	65
Irish Albums (OCC)	13
Scottish Albums (OCC)	6
Swiss Albums (Schweizer Hitparade)	44
UK Albums (OCC)	3
UK R&B Albums (OCC)	1

== Certifications ==
Region	Certification	Certified units/sales
United Kingdom (BPI)	Silver	60,000^{‡}
^{‡} Sales+streaming figures based on certification alone.
