= Not Waving, but Drowning =

2019 studio album by Loyle Carner

Studio album by Loyle Carner
- Released: 19 April 2019
- Genre: Hip hop
- Length: 48:12
- Label: AMF; Virgin EMI
- Producer: Jordan Rakei, Tom Misch, Joice, Kwes, Rebel Kleff, Dan Parry (additional), Charlotte Day Wilson

Loyle Carner chronology
Yesterday's Gone (2017)	Not Waving, but Drowning (2019)	Hugo (2022)

Professional ratings
Aggregate scores
Source	Rating
AnyDecentMusic?	7.2/10
Metacritic	70/100
Review scores
Source	Rating
AllMusic	3.5/5 stars
Clash	7/10
DIY	3/5 stars
The Guardian	3/5 stars
The Independent	4/5 stars
The Line of Best Fit	9/10
Loud and Quiet	7/10
NME	3/5 stars
The Observer	3/5 stars

Not Waving, but Drowning is the second studio album by British rapper Loyle Carner. It was released on 19 April 2019 via AMF/Virgin EMI Records. The name comes from the poem "Not Waving but Drowning" by British poet Stevie Smith.

== Track listing ==
Credits adapted from Tidal.

No.	Title	Writer(s)	Producer(s)	Length
1.	"Dear Jean"	Benjamin Coyle-Larner; Jordan Rakei	Rakei	1:43
2.	"Angel" (featuring Tom Misch)	B Coyle-Larner; Marcos Valle; Paulo Sergio Kostenbader Valle; Misch; Yussef Dayes	Misch	4:43
3.	"Ice Water"	Ben Joyce; B Coyle-Larner; Lawrence Dickins	Joice; Kwes^{[a]}	3:29
4.	"Ottolenghi" (featuring Jordan Rakei)	Alfa Sekitoleko; B Coyle-Larner; Rakei	Rakei	3:17
5.	"You Don't Know" (featuring Rebel Kleff & Kiko Bun)	Ann Bridgeforth; B Coyle-Larner; Dave Hamilton; Federico Marin; Kristian Revelle; Rony Darrell	Rebel Kleff	4:10
6.	"Still"	B Coyle-Larner; Kwesi Sey	Kwes	3:33
7.	"It's Coming Home?"	B Coyle-Larner	–	0:36
8.	"Desoleil (Brilliant Corners)" (featuring Sampha)	B Coyle-Larner; Elan Tamara Sey; K Sey; Sampha Sisay	Kwes	3:40
9.	"Loose Ends" (featuring Jorja Smith)	B Coyle-Larner; Rakei	J Rakei; Dan Parry^{[a]}	4:16
10.	"Not Waving, But Drowning"	Rakei; Stevie Smith	Rakei; Parry^{[a]}	1:04
11.	"Krispy"	B Coyle-Larner; K Sey	Kwes	3:41
12.	"Sail Away (Freestyle)"	B Coyle-Larner; Charlotte Day Wilson; Rakei	Wilson; Rakei	4:16
13.	"Looking Back"	B Coyle-Larner; Misch	Misch	2:58
14.	"Carluccio"	B Coyle-Larner; Duval Timothy; E T Sey; K Sey	Kwes	3:11
15.	"Dear Ben" (featuring Jean Coyle-Larner)	Jean Coyle-Larner; Rakei	Rakei	3:30
Total length:				48:12

Notes

- ^{^[a]} signifies an additional producer.

== Charts ==
Chart (2019)	Peak position
Belgian Albums (Ultratop Flanders)	31
Belgian Albums (Ultratop Wallonia)	169
Dutch Albums (Album Top 100)	51
French Albums (SNEP)	109
German Albums (Offizielle Top 100)	66
Irish Albums (IRMA)	26
Scottish Albums (OCC)	20
Swiss Albums (Schweizer Hitparade)	33
UK Albums (OCC)	3
UK R&B Albums (OCC)	1

== Certifications ==
Region	Certification	Certified units/sales
United Kingdom (BPI)	Gold	100,000^{‡}
^{‡} Sales+streaming figures based on certification alone.
