= Love Me Too Well, I'll Retire Early =

EP by Katie Gregson-MacLeod
- Released: 4 July 2025
- Length: 16:57
- Label: Last Recordings on Earth
- Producer: Josh Scarbrow

Katie Gregson-MacLeod chronology
Big Red (2023)	Love Me Too Well, I'll Retire Early (2025)

Singles from Love Me Too Well, I'll Retire Early
- 1. "Mosh Pit" Released: 10 April 2025; 2. "James" Released: 21 May 2025

Love Me Too Well, I'll Retire Early is the fourth EP by Scottish musician Katie Gregson-MacLeod. It was released on 4 July 2025, via Last Recordings on Earth.

== Background ==
The EP was produced by Josh Scarbrow and recorded in a Helmsdale studio. On 10 April 2025, Gregson-MacLeod released the EP's first single, "Mosh Pit". "James" was released as the second single on 21 May 2025.

== Reception ==
Professional ratings
Review scores
Source	Rating
DIY	4/5 stars
The Skinny	3/5 stars

Sophie McVinnie of DIY assigned the EP a four-star rating and described it as ditching "the heavy piano ballads in favour of an intimate splay of strings, often nudging her along like soft waves beneath a sailboat."

It received a three-star rating from the Skinny, whose reviewer Adam Clarke remarked, "Gregson-Macleod's eye for intimate moments means the EP is as warm and personal as the rest of her work," noting a lack of piano use in the project.

== Track listing ==
Love Me Too Well, I'll Retire Early track listing
No.	Title	Writer(s)	Length
1.	"Love Me Too Well, I'll Retire Early"	Katie Gregson-MacLeod	2:34
2.	"James" (featuring Joesef)	Gregson-MacLeod; Josh Scarbrow; Joesef Traynor	3:10
3.	"Chess"	Gregson-MacLeod; Benjamin Francis Leftwich; Steve Robson; Jamie Squire	2:06
4.	"I Just Think of It All the Time"	Gregson-MacLeod; Leftwich; Robson; Squire	3:44
5.	"Mosh Pit"	Gregson-MacLeod; Leftwich	5:23
Total length:			16:57

== Personnel ==
Credits adapted from Tidal.

- Katie Gregson-MacLeod – lead vocals (all tracks), production (track 1)
- Josh Scarbrow – production (2–4), acoustic guitar (2, 3), background vocals (4), electric guitar (4)
- Laura Wilkie – violin (2–4)
- Joesef Traynor – production, acoustic guitar, background vocals (2)
- Christopher Dickie – drums (2, 4)
- Juliette Lemoine – cello (3, 4)
- Benjamin Francis Leftwich – background vocals (3)

== Charts ==
Chart performance for Love Me Too Well, I'll Retire Early
Chart (2025)	Peak position
Scottish Albums (OCC)	24
