= Loyle Carner =

English hip-hop musician (born 1994)

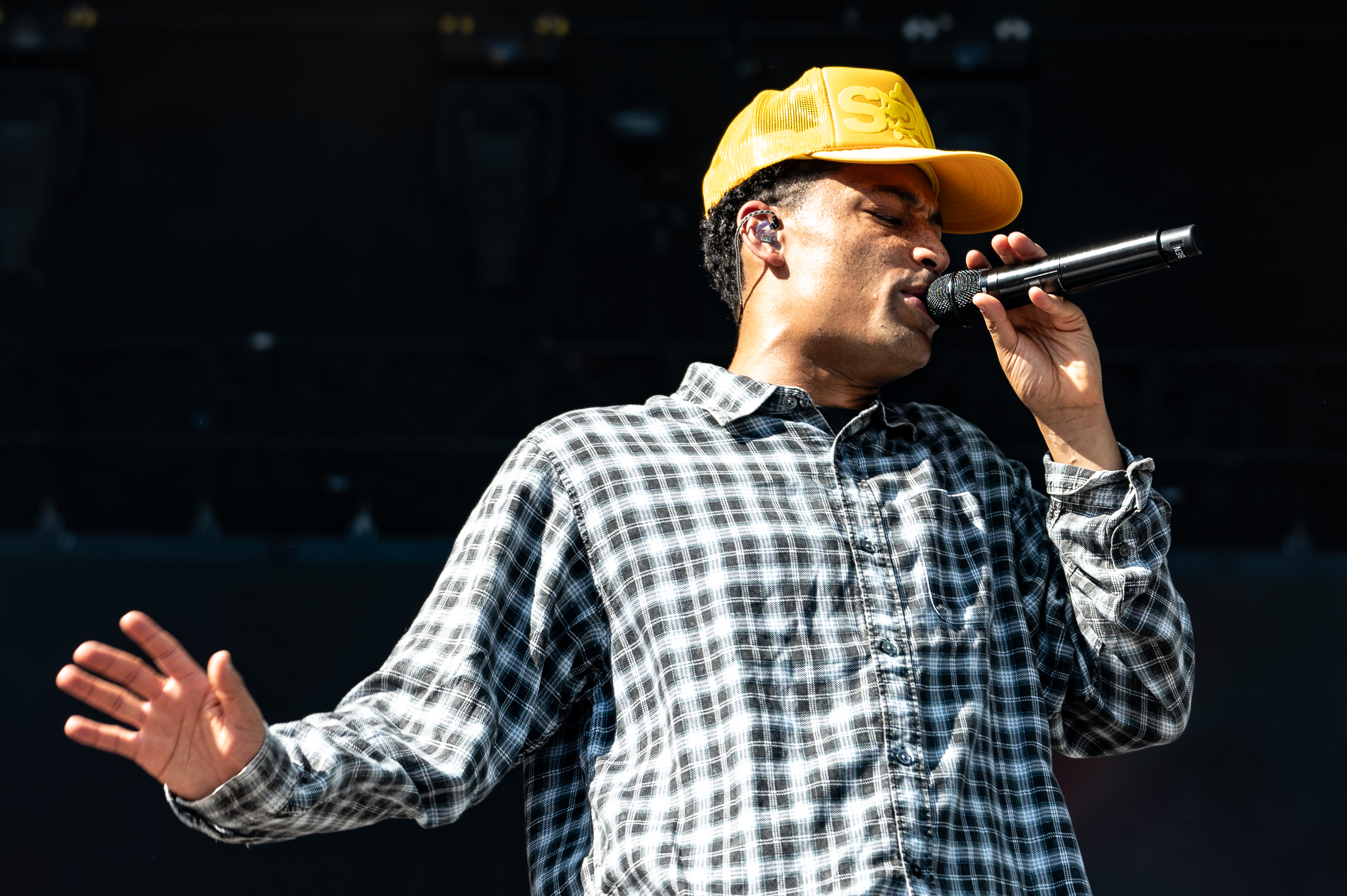
- Carner performing at Haldern Pop in 2019

Background information
- Born: Benjamin Gerard Coyle-Larner; 6 October 1994 (age 32); Lambeth, South London, England
- Genre: Hip-hop
- Instruments: Vocals
- Years active: 2012–present
- Labels: AMF; Speedy Wunderground; Transgressive Records; Virgin EMI Records
- Website: loylecarner.com

Benjamin Gerard Coyle-Larner (born 6 October 1994), known professionally as Loyle Carner, is a British hip-hop musician. He released his debut album, Yesterday's Gone, in 2017, which was nominated for the 2017 Mercury Prize. He released his second album, Not Waving, but Drowning, in April 2019, and his third, hugo, in October 2022. His fourth studio album, Hopefully!, was released in June 2025. Carner has been nominated for three Brit Awards.

== Early life and education ==
Benjamin Gerard Coyle-Larner was born on 6 October 1994 in Lambeth, South London. He and his younger brother, Ryan, were raised in South Croydon by his mother, Jean, a teacher of children with learning difficulties, and his stepfather, Nik. He has contact with his biological father, Robert Nicholas Junior Carter, who is of Guyanese descent. Carner is mixed race.

His stage name is a spoonerism of his double-barrelled surname as well as a reference to his childhood struggle with his ADHD and dyslexia diagnoses.

At the age of 13, Carner had a small role in the 2008 film 10,000 BC. He started his secondary education at Whitgift School in South Croydon, then, after having secured a scholarship, moved on to study at the Brit School for Performing Arts and Technology. He was then accepted into the Drama Centre, where he began a degree in acting. In 2014, he dropped out of the Drama Centre after his stepfather died of sudden unexpected death in epilepsy (SUDEP), deciding to focus on his music.

== Career ==
=== Music ===
Carner played his first official gig at The Button Factory in Dublin, Ireland, in October 2012 supporting rapper MF Doom. He released his first extended play in September 2014, titled A Little Late, which was well received by music critics. Carner supported American rapper Joey Badass on his UK tour and went on to play the 2015 UK festival season, including Glastonbury Festival. He played on Huw Stephens' BBC Radio 1 show as part of their Piano Sessions series in October of that year. Carner was included in the BBC's Sound of 2016 list. In August 2016, he supported American rapper Nas in his show at the O2 Academy Bristol. Later in the year, he collaborated with poet Kae Tempest for a performance.

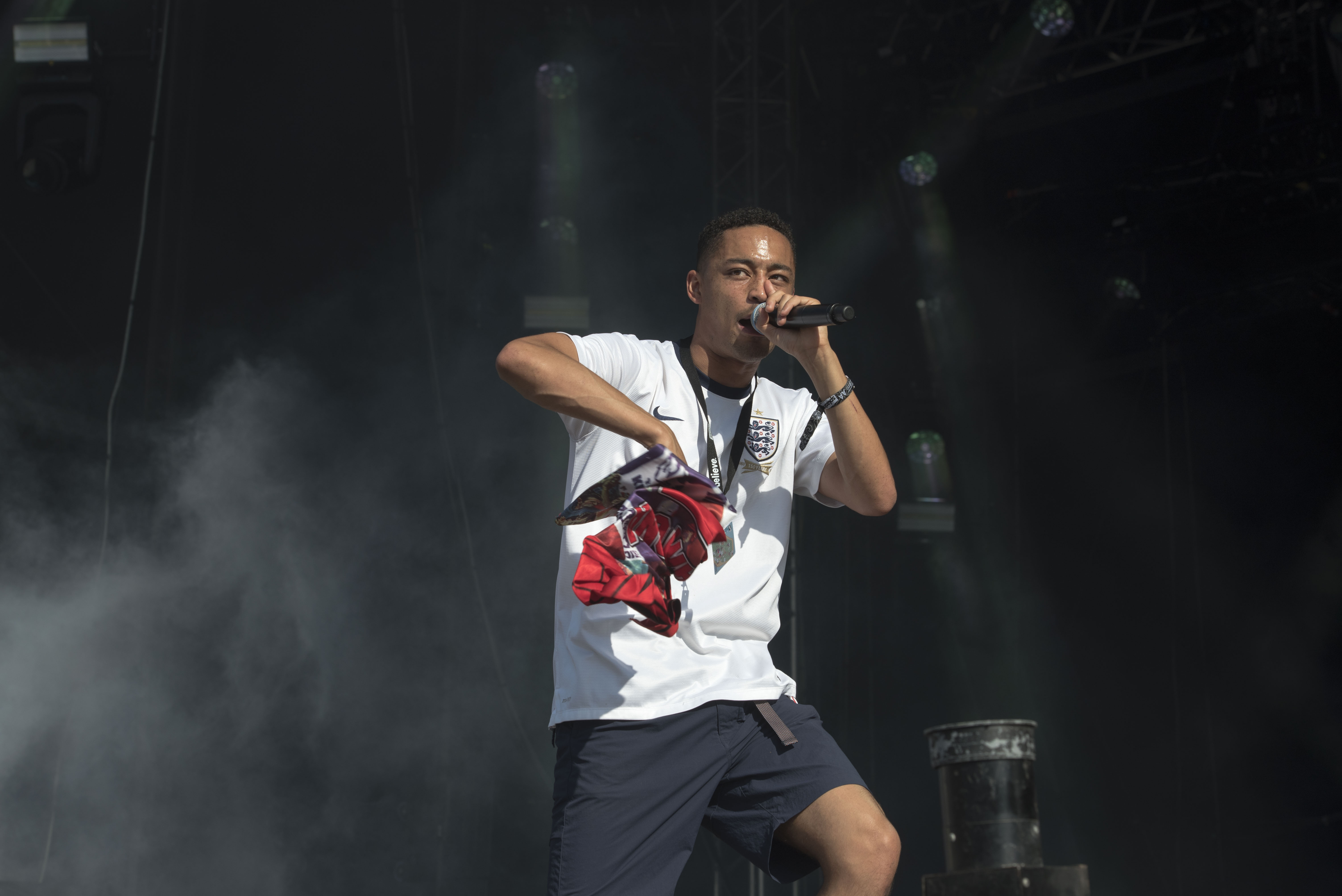
Loyle Carner performing at the Splash! Festival in 2017.

Carner's debut album, entitled Yesterday's Gone, was released on 20 January 2017. It garnered acclaim from music critics, with The Independent naming it the album of the year. The album was nominated for the 2017 Mercury Prize, but the prize was won by Sampha for Process.

In 2018, he received two respective Brit Award nominations for British Breakthrough Act and British Male Solo Artist. He was scheduled to perform on BBC Radio 1 in February 2018 but cancelled due to a disagreement over cover song choices. Carner's second album, Not Waving, but Drowning, was released on 19 April 2019. On 30 June, he performed as part of the year's Glastonbury Festival on its Other Stage, marking his second appearance after playing the John Peel Stage the year before. The song "Angel" was listed as part of the FIFA 20 soundtrack playlist. In 2020, Carner and his brother co-directed a music video for the song "Eugene" by Arlo Parks.

Carner performing in October 2022.

Carner's third studio album, Hugo, was released on 21 October 2022. It was met with critical acclaim. At Metacritic the album received an average score of 87, based on 8 reviews. Hugo was nominated for the 2023 Mercury Prize, but lost to Ezra Collective's Where I'm Meant to Be.

Carner headlined Glastonbury's West Holts stage in 2023. During his set, he brought up former youth MP Athian Akec on stage, who gave a speech about the knife crimes in the UK.

On 24 May 2024, Carner released his first live album, Hugo: Reimagined (Live from the Royal Albert Hall). Recorded during his performance at the Royal Albert Hall in October 2023, it includes all songs from his album Hugo, as well as some songs from his previous albums.

On 20 June 2025, Carner released his fourth studio album, Hopefully!. In its first charting week, Hopefully! opened at number two on the UK Albums Chart, marking it his highest charting album in the country.

Carner performed at the Soundstorm music festival in Banban, Riyadh, Saudi Arabia, in December 2025.

=== Acting ===
Carner made his acting debut as Arran in the crime drama series Mint, which premiered on BBC One and iPlayer on 20 April 2026.

== Artistry ==
Carner employs a "languid" style of rapping. His sound has been described as "confessional and clever lyricism", "jazz-infused", as well as "sensitive and eloquent". He cites American hip-hop and grime music as musical influences. He also regards American poet Langston Hughes and British writer Benjamin Zephaniah as inspirations.

Carner has described himself as feeling “like an outsider, in a nice way,” while also recognising his place in the UK rap lineage, citing admiration from both grime MCs such as Kano and Ghetts and UK hip-hop figures including Rodney P, Jehst, and Klashnekoff. He explained that his aim was “to be a link in the chain, to take it from where it was before and allow another generation to love it as much as me.”

== Other activities ==
In 2018, Carner appeared in a film for a project by the charity organisation Campaign Against Living Miserably (CALM), which aims to prevent male suicide. The following year, he curated an art exhibition and donated its proceeds to CALM.

As of 2018 he was running a cooking school for children with ADHD called Chilli Con Carner. He has titled songs after chefs Yotam Ottolenghi and Antonio Carluccio.

== Personal life ==
Carner has one son (born late 2020) and one daughter (born 2024).

Carner is a supporter of Liverpool F.C. As a tribute to his stepfather, who idolised Eric Cantona and was a passionate Manchester United F.C. supporter, Carner released a song titled "Cantona". He also named his 2016 tour after Cantona, and has worn his stepfather's Cantona shirt during concerts. Carner used samples of songs written and performed by his stepfather alongside Misure La VerT for Yesterday's Gone's hidden title track, which concludes the album.

== Discography ==
=== Studio albums ===
List of studio albums, with selected details and chart positions
| Title | Details | Peak chart positions | | | | | | | | Certifications |
| Title | Details | UK | BEL (FL) | FRA | GER | IRE | NLD | SCO | SWI | Certifications |
|---|---|---|---|---|---|---|---|---|---|---|
| Yesterday's Gone | Released: 20 January 2017; Label: AMF Records; Format: CD, digital download, vinyl | 14 | 135 | 171 | 86 | — | — | 43 | 69 | BPI: Gold |
| Not Waving, but Drowning | Released: 19 April 2019; Label: AMF Records; Format: CD, digital download, vinyl | 3 | 31 | 109 | 66 | 26 | 51 | 20 | 33 | BPI: Gold |
| Hugo | Released: 21 October 2022; Label: AMF Records; Format: CD, digital download, vinyl | 3 | 27 | — | 65 | 13 | 42 | 6 | 44 | BPI: Silver |
| Hopefully! | Released: 20 June 2025; Label: Island EMI; Format: CD, digital download, vinyl | 2 | 5 | — | 17 | 52 | 13 | 4 | 31 | |
"—" denotes a recording that did not chart or was not released in that territory.

=== Live albums ===
List of live albums, with selected details and chart positions
| Title | Details | Peak chart positions | |
| Title | Details | UK R&B/HH | SCO |
|---|---|---|---|
| Hugo: Reimagined (Live from the Royal Albert Hall) | Released: 24 May 2024; Label: EMI Records; Format: CD, digital download, vinyl, streaming | 5 | 85 |

=== Extended plays ===
- A Little Late (2014)

=== Singles ===
==== As a lead artist ====
List of singles as lead artist, with selected chart positions and certifications, showing year released and album name
| Title | Year | Peak chart positions | Certifications | Album |
| Title | Year | UK | Certifications | Album |
|---|---|---|---|---|
| "Tierney Terrace / Florence" | 2015 | — | | Non-album single |
| "Ain't Nothing Changed" | 2015 | — | BPI: Silver | Yesterday's Gone |
| "Stars & Shards" | 2016 | — | | Yesterday's Gone |
| "No CD" (featuring Rebel Kleff) | 2016 | — | BPI: Silver | Yesterday's Gone |
| "The Isle of Arran" | 2016 | — | BPI: Silver | Yesterday's Gone |
| "Ottolenghi" (with Jordan Rakei) | 2018 | 74 | BPI: Gold | Not Waving, but Drowning |
| "You Don't Know" (with Rebel Kleff & Kiko Bun) | 2019 | — | | Not Waving, but Drowning |
| "Loose Ends" (with Jorja Smith) | 2019 | 62 | BPI: Gold | Not Waving, but Drowning |
| "Yesterday" | 2020 | — | | Non-album singles |
| "Let It Go" (with Erick the Architect & FARR) | 2020 | — | | Non-album singles |
| "Hate" | 2022 | — | | Hugo |
| "Georgetown" (featuring John Agard) | 2022 | — | | Hugo |
| "Nobody Knows (Ladas Road)" | 2022 | — | | Hugo |
| "Take It Slow" (with ENNY) | 2023 | — | | We Go Again |
| "All I Need / In My Mind" | 2025 | — | | Hopefully! |
| "About Time / Lyin" | 2025 | — | | Hopefully! |
"—" denotes a recording that did not chart or was not released in that territory.

==== As a featured artist ====
List of singles as a featured artist, with selected certifications, showing year released, and album name
| Title | Year | Certifications | Album |
|---|---|---|---|
| "Nightgowns" (Tom Misch featuring Loyle Carner) | 2015 | | Beat Tape 2 |
| "When Will I Stop Dreaming" (Cadenza featuring Loyle Carner & Kiko Bun) | 2015 | | Non-album single |
| "Crazy Dream" (Tom Misch featuring Loyle Carner) | 2016 | BPI: Silver | Reverie EP |
| "Water Baby" (Tom Misch featuring Loyle Carner) | 2018 | | Geography |
| "Good to Be Home" (Barney Artist featuring Tom Misch, Loyle Carner & Rebel Kleff) | 2018 | | Non-album single |
| "What Am I to Do?" (Ezra Collective featuring Loyle Carner) | 2019 | | You Can't Steal My Joy |
| "It’s Ok to Cry" (Kofi Stone featuring Loyle Carner) | 2019 | | Nobody Cares Till Everybody Does |
| "I Wonder Why" (Joesef featuring Loyle Carner) | 2020 | | Does It Make You Feel Good? EP |
| "Hocus Pocus" (Unknown T featuring Loyle Carner) | 2024 | | Blood Diamond |
| "Colourblind" (Tom Misch featuring Loyle Carner) | 2024 | | TBA |

=== Other charted and certified songs ===
List of non-single songs, with selected chart positions and certifications, showing year released and album name
| Title | Year | Peak chart positions | Certification | Album |
| Title | Year | UK | Certification | Album |
|---|---|---|---|---|
| "Damselfly" (featuring Tom Misch) | 2017 | — | BPI: Gold | Yesterday's Gone |
| "Ice Water" | 2019 | — | BPI: Silver | Not Waving, but Drowning |
| "Still" | 2019 | — | BPI: Silver | Not Waving, but Drowning |
| "Desoleil (Brilliant Corners)" (with Sampha) | 2019 | — | BPI: Silver | Not Waving, but Drowning |
| "Speed of Plight" | 2022 | 88 | | Hugo |
"—" denotes a recording that did not chart in that territory.

=== Guest appearances ===
List of guest appearances, showing year released, other artists and album name
| Title | Year | Other artist(s) | Album |
|---|---|---|---|
| "1992" | 2013 | Rejjie Snow | Rejovich — EP |
| "Guts" | 2016 | Kae Tempest | Speedy Wunderground – Year 2 |
| "Shadows" | 2017 | MANIK MC | Midnight Express — EP |
| "Taxin' (Long Version)" | 2019 | DJ Shadow | Our Pathetic Age |

== Accolades ==
| Year | Organisation/Event | Award | Work | Result | Ref. |
|---|---|---|---|---|---|
| 2017 | Mercury Prize | Album of the Year | Yesterday's Gone | Nominated | |
| 2018 | NME Awards | Best British Solo Artist supported by VO5 | Himself | Won | |
| 2018 | NME Awards | Best Album supported by Orange Amplification | Yesterday's Gone | Nominated | |
| 2018 | Brit Awards | British Breakthrough Act | Himself | Nominated | |
| 2018 | Brit Awards | British Male Solo Artist | Himself | Nominated | |
| 2019 | Q Awards | Best Solo Act | Himself | Nominated | |
| 2022 | BBC Radio 1 | Hottest Record of the Year | "Nobody Knows (Ladas Road)" | Nominated | |
| 2023 | Mercury Prize | Album of the Year | Hugo | Nominated | |
| 2019 | Berlin Music Video Awards | Best Experimental | "Ottolenghi" (with Jordan Rakei) | Won | |
