= Chloe Qisha =

Malaysian-born musician

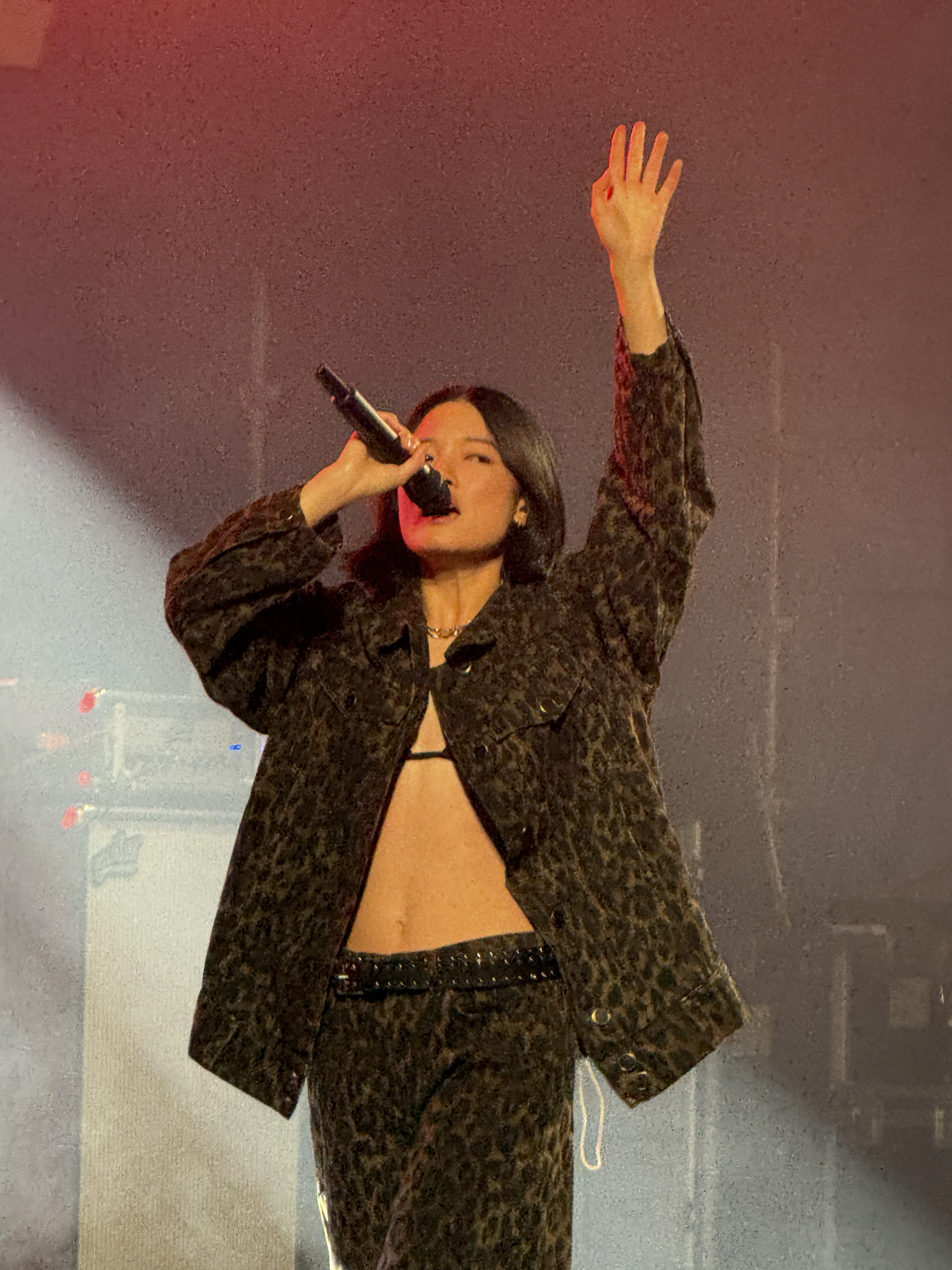
- Qisha performing in August 2025

Background information
- Born: Chloe Qi Sha Lim; 1998 or 1999; Malaysia
- Origin: London, England
- Genres: Pop; alternative pop; electropop
- Occupations: Singer; songwriter; musician
- Instruments: Vocals; guitar; piano
- Years active: 2024-present
- Labels: VLF, Are You Serious?, Sony
- Website: chloeqisha.com

Chloe Qi Sha Lim (born 1998 or 1999), known professionally as Chloe Qisha, is a Malaysian-born singer based in London. She was included in the BBC's Sound of 2026 shortlist.

== Early life ==
Qisha attended an international school in Kuala Lumpur. At age 16, Qisha moved with her family to England, where she went to boarding school. Qisha graduated with a degree in Psychology and then pursued a Masters in Communication. During university, she began uploading song covers to YouTube.

== Artistry ==
In 2024, Qisha described her sound as "nostalgic alternative pop". She grew up listening to the disco her parents would play and in particular ABBA, LCD Soundsystem, Talking Heads, the Bee Gees and Tears for Fears. Regarding her adolescent pop influences, Qisha considers herself an "OG fan" of Troye Sivan, calling him a "massive influence" when she started writing and one that has "stood the test of time". She called the likes of Katy Perry's "Teenage Dream" the "backbone of my catalogue". She also cited contemporaries including Rosalía and Holly Humberstone as influences. Other artists she has praised include Anderson Paak.

== Discography ==
=== Mixtapes ===
Title	Details
Fantasize	Released: 30 October 2026; Label: Sony; Formats: Streaming, digital download

=== Extended plays ===
Title	Details
Chloe Qisha	Released: 15 November 2024; Label: VLF, Are You Serious?; Formats: Streaming, digital download
Modern Romance	Released: 15 May 2025; Label: VLF, Are You Serious?; Formats: Streaming, digital download

=== Singles ===
Title	Year	Peak chart positions	Album
Title	Year	JPN Over.	Album
"VCR Home Video"	2024	—	Chloe Qisha
"I Lied, I'm Sorry"	2024	—	Chloe Qisha
"Sexy Goodbye"	2024	—	Chloe Qisha
"21st Century Cool Girl"	2025	—	Modern Romance
"Sex, Drugs & Existential Dread"	2025	—	Modern Romance
"Modern Romance"	2025	—	Modern Romance
"So Sad So Hot"	2025	—	Fantasize
"YDH"	2026	—	Fantasize
"Surprise Surprise"	2026	—	Fantasize
"Baby Girl"	2026	—	Fantasize
"Question of the Day"	2026	7	Fantasize
"He Likes Boys"	2026	—	Fantasize
"Mama!"	2026	—	Fantasize

== Awards and nominations ==
Organisation	Year	Category	Nominee(s)/work(s)	Result	Ref.
BBC Radio 1	2026	Sound of 2026	Chloe Qisha	Nominated	
Notion New Music Awards	2025	Best New Pop	Chloe Qisha	Nominated	
Ivor Novello Awards	2026	Rising Star Award	Chloe Qisha	Nominated	
ZYN Rolling Stone UK Awards	2025	The Breakthrough Award	Chloe Qisha	Nominated	
