= Alfa Mist =

British musician

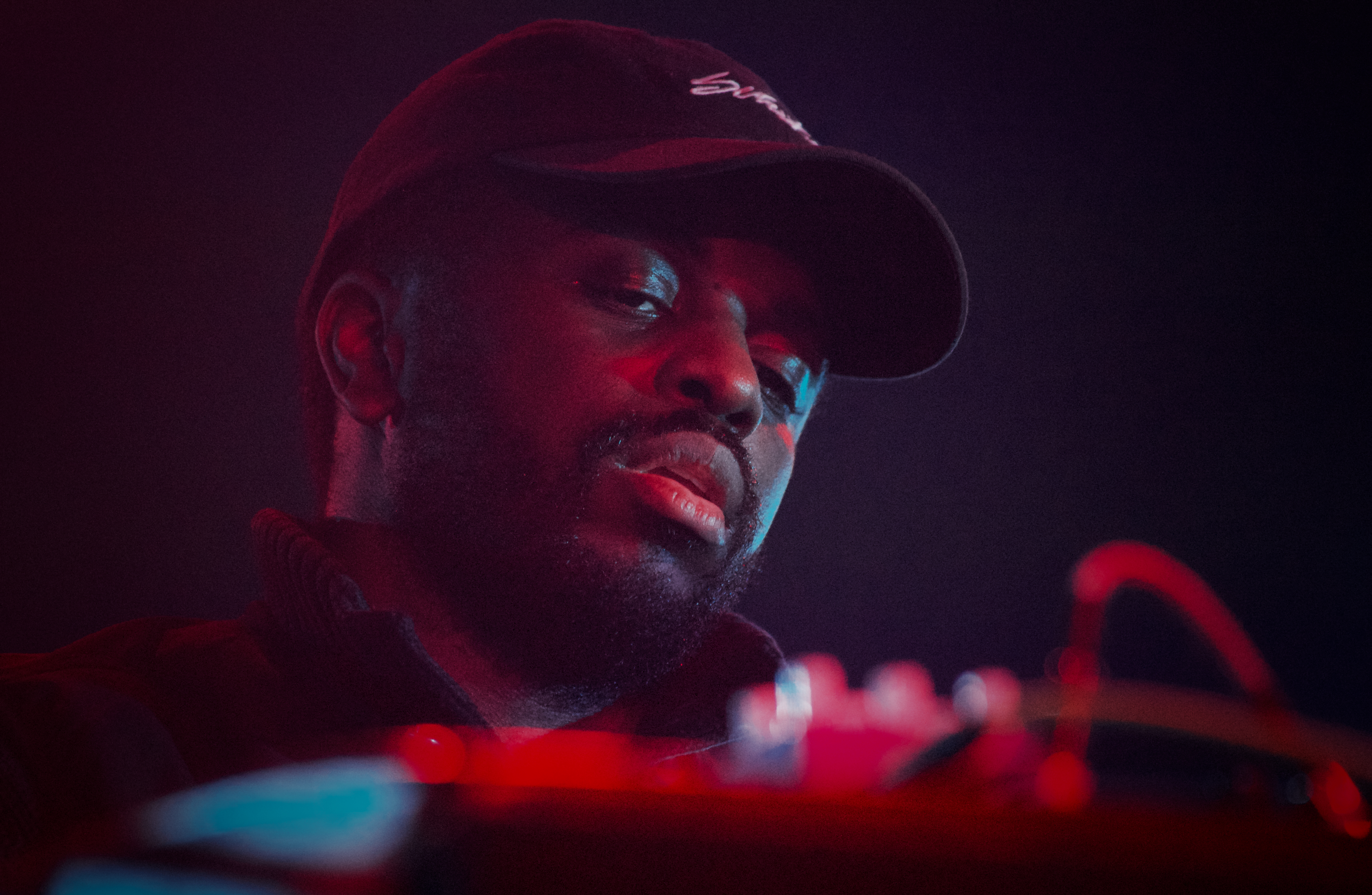
- Alfa Mist in 2022

Background information
- Born: Alfa Sekitoleko; 1991/1992; Newham, London, England
- Genres: Jazz; nu jazz; hip hop
- Instruments: Electric piano, piano
- Years active: 2014–present
- Labels: Sekito, Anti-
- Website: alfamist.co.uk

Alfa Mist (born Alfa Sekitoleko; 1991 or 1992) is a British musician, producer, songwriter, and MC based in Newham, London. His music mixes hip-hop and club styles with jazz improvisation. He released his first solo EP Nocturne in 2015, and an album, Bring Backs, in 2021. He also runs a music label called Sekito.

== Early life and education ==
Alfa Sekitoleko was born in 1991 or 1992 the United Kingdom and grew up in Newham, London.

He attended Langdon Academy and Newham Sixth Form College. He originally wanted to become a professional footballer, playing for Torquay United's U-16 team, but his mother wanted him to complete two years at college first. He took three A-levels plus a BTEC in music composition. He began creating music at the age of 15. As a teenage hip-hop producer, his interest in sampling led him to discovering jazz and eventually teaching himself how to play piano, after watching his music tutor perform John Legend's "Ordinary People".

== Career ==
Sekitoleko took the stage name Alfa Mist for his career as musician, producer, songwriter, and MC. He is based in Newham, London.

His first solo EP was Nocturne, released in 2015.

In 2021, he released an album titled Bring Backs on the American independent music label Anti-. In August of that year, he performed at the We Out Here festival, and was one of the MOBO Awards 2021 nominees.

He has collaborated with several musicians, including Jordan Rakei, Yussef Dayes, and Tom Misch. He also runs a music label called Sekito.

=== Style ===
Mist's music mixes hip-hop and club styles with jazz improvisation.

== Discography ==
=== Albums ===
Title	Details
Antiphon	Released: 3 March 2017; Label: Pink Bird Recording; Format: digital download, CD, LP
Structuralism	Released: 26 April 2019; Label: Sekito; Format: digital download, CD, LP
Epoch (with Emmavie)	Released: 2014; Re-released: 17 April 2020; Label: Sekito; Format: digital download, LP
Bring Backs	Released: 23 April 2021; Label: Anti-; Format: digital download, CD, LP
Variables	Released: 21 April 2023; Label: Anti-; Format: digital download, CD, LP
Roulette	Released: 3 October 2025

=== EPs ===
Title	Details
Nocturne	Released: 31 July 2015; Label: self-released; Format: digital download, CD
7 October (Epilogue)	Released: 7 October 2018; Label: Sekito; Format: digital download
On My Ones	Released: 28 February 2020; Label: Sekito; Format: digital download, CD, LP
Two for Mistake	Released: 17 November 2021; Label: Anti-; Format: digital download
Dersen Cafe & Give Nothing	Released: 4 September 2025; Label: Sekito; Format: digital download
