= Tom Misch =

English musician and producer (born 1995)

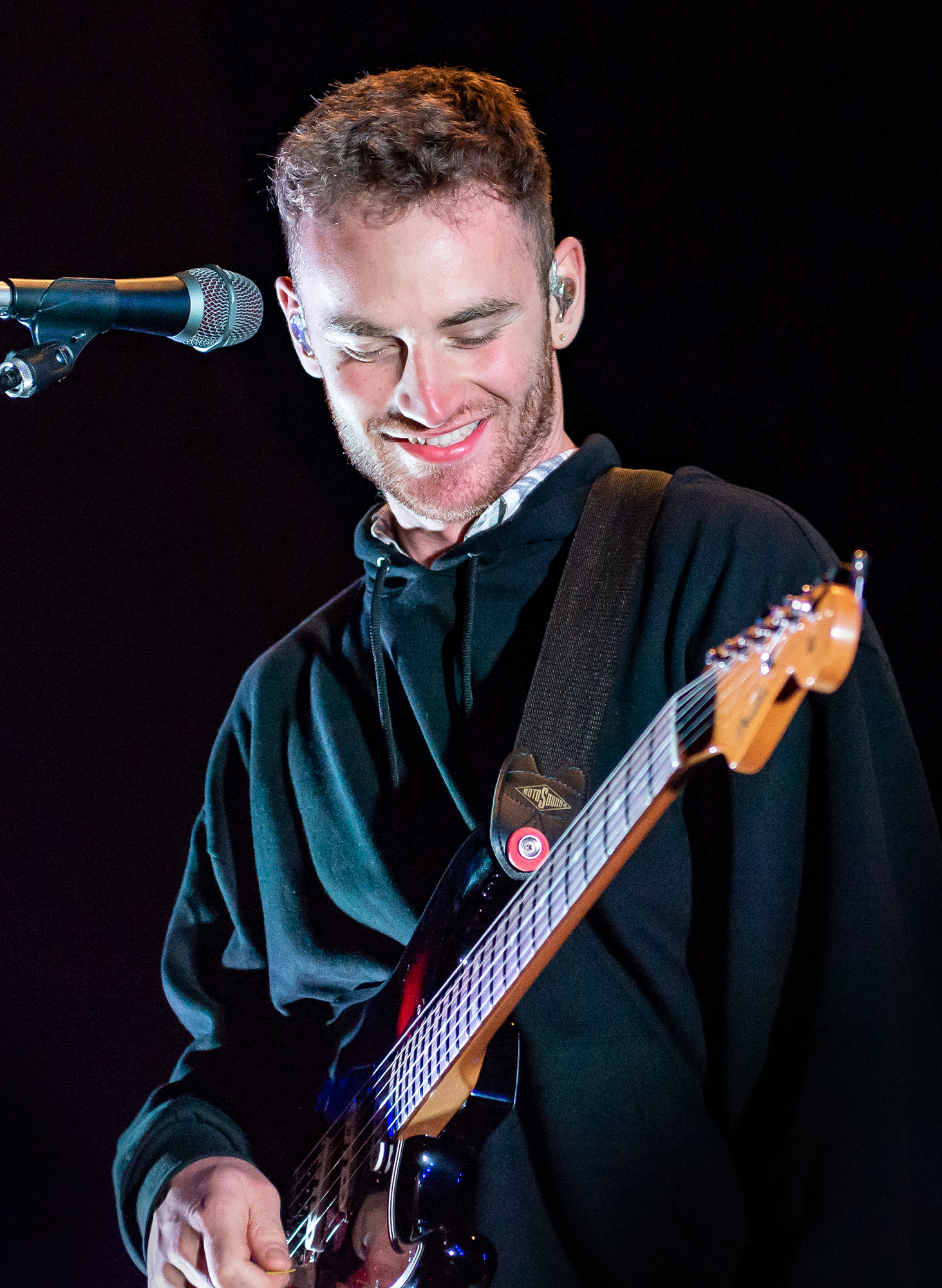
- Tom Misch performing live at The Novo in 2018

Background information
- Also known as: Supershy
- Born: Thomas Abraham Misch; 25 June 1995 (age 31); London, England
- Genres: Neo soul; nu jazz; funk; jazz; hip-hop; electronic; jazz-funk; acid jazz; R&B; jazz rap; ambient; nu-disco; alternative
- Instruments: Vocals; guitar; violin; drums; bass guitar; saxophone
- Years active: 2012–present
- Labels: Beyond the Groove; Blue Note
- Website: tommisch.com

Thomas Abraham Misch (born 25 June 1995) is an English musician and producer. He began releasing music on SoundCloud in 2012 and released his debut studio album Geography in 2018. In 2020, he released his second studio album What Kinda Music in collaboration with English jazz drummer Yussef Dayes, distributed through Blue Note Records and Caroline. The Album was nominated for the Best Album Ivor Novello Award in 2021. In 2023 he released his third studio album Happy Music, in "collaboration" with his alter-ego, Supershy. In 2026, he released his fourth studio album Full Circle.

== Early life and education ==
Misch studied music technology at Langley Park School for Boys and later, in 2014, enrolled in a jazz guitar course at Trinity Laban Conservatoire of Music and Dance in Greenwich but left after six months to focus on his own music. He began learning to play the violin at age 4, later learning to play the guitar.

== Discography ==
=== Studio albums ===
List of studio albums, with selected details, chart positions and certifications
Title	Album details	Peak chart positions										Certifications
Title	Album details	UK	BEL (FL)	FRA	GER	IRE	NLD	NZ Heat.	SWI	US Heat.	US Jazz	Certifications
Geography	Released: 6 April 2018; Label: Beyond the Groove; Formats: CD, LP, digital download, streaming	8	94	149	89	30	29	5	75	17	2	BPI: Gold
What Kinda Music (with Yussef Dayes)	Released: 24 April 2020; Label: Beyond the Groove; Formats: CD, LP, DL, streaming	4	25	153	17	40	57	—	20	—	—	
Happy Music (as Supershy)	Released: 18 August 2023; Label: Beyond the Groove; Formats: LP, digital download, streaming	—	—	—	—	—	—	—	—	—	—	
Full Circle	Released: 27 March 2026; Label: Beyond the Groove; Formats: LP, digital download, streaming	9	62	175	66	—	22	—	—	—	—	
"—" denotes album was not released or did not chart in that territory.

=== Extended plays ===
List of extended plays, with selected details
Title	EP details
Out to Sea (with Carmody)	Released: 8 December 2014; Label: Beyond the Groove; Format: DL, streaming
Reverie	Released: 15 July 2016; Label: Beyond the Groove; Format: DL, streaming
5 Day Mischon	Released: 31 March 2017; Label: Beyond the Groove; Format: DL, streaming
Six Songs	Released: 20 December 2024; Label: Beyond the Groove; Format: DL, streaming

=== Mixtapes ===
List of mixtapes, with selected details, chart positions and certifications
Title	Mixtape details	Peak chart positions	Certifications
Title	Mixtape details	JPN	Certifications
Beat Tape 1	Released: 14 March 2014; Label: Beyond the Groove; Format: CD, LP, DL, streaming	138	
Beat Tape 2	Released: 28 August 2015; Label: Beyond the Groove; Format: CD, LP, DL, streaming	—	BPI: Silver
"—" denotes mixtape was not released or did not chart in that territory.

=== Singles ===
==== As lead artist ====
Title	Year	Peak chart positions			Certifications	Album
Title	Year	UK Indie	FRA	NZ Hot	Certifications	Album
"Memory"	2014	—	—	—		Non-album single
"So Close" (with Carmody)	2014	—	—	—		Out to Sea EP
"Sunshine"	2015	—	—	—		Non-album single
"In the Midst of It All" (featuring Sam Wills)	2015	—	—	—		Beat Tape 2
"Wake Up This Day" (featuring Jordan Rakei)	2015	—	—	—		Beat Tape 2
"Wander with Me" (featuring Carmody)	2015	—	—	—		Beat Tape 2
"Nightgowns" (featuring Loyle Carner)	2015	—	—	—		Beat Tape 2
"Crazy Dream" (featuring Loyle Carner)	2016	—	—	—	BPI: Silver	Reverie EP
"I Wish"	2016	—	—	—		Reverie EP
"Watch Me Dance"	2016	—	—	—		Reverie EP
"South of the River"	2018	—	—	—		Geography
"Movie"	2018	—	—	—		Geography
"Water Baby" (featuring Loyle Carner)	2018	—	—	—		Geography
"It Runs Through Me" (featuring De La Soul)	2018	—	196	—	BPI: Silver	Geography
"Lost in Paris" (featuring GoldLink)	2018	23	—	—		Geography
"Money" (with Michael Kiwanuka)	2019	—	—	—		Non-album single
"What Kinda Music" (with Yussef Dayes)	2020	—	—	—		What Kinda Music
"Lift Off" (with Yussef Dayes featuring Rocco Palladino)	2020	—	—	—		What Kinda Music
"Kyiv" (with Yussef Dayes)	2020	—	—	—		What Kinda Music
"Nightrider" (with Yussef Dayes featuring Freddie Gibbs)	2020	—	—	—		What Kinda Music
"Cinnamon Curls"	2024	—	—	34		Six Songs
"Better Days"	2024	—	—	—		Six Songs
"Old Man	2025	—	—	—		Full Circle
"Red Moon"	2025	—	—	—		Full Circle
"Sisters with Me"	2026	—	—	—		Full Circle
"Slow Tonight"	2026	—	—	—		Full Circle
"Days of Us" (with Kaidi Akinnibi)	2026	—	—	—		Full Circle
"Echo From The Flames"	2026	—	—	—		Full Circle
"—" denotes single was not released or did not chart in that territory.

==== As featured artist ====
Title	Year	Album
"Good to Be Home" (Barney Artist featuring Tom Misch, Loyle Carner & Rebel Kleff)	2018	Non-album singles
"Can't Run Away" (Never Moved Remix) (Brudis featuring Tom Misch)	2018	Non-album singles
"Cosmic Sans" (Cory Wong featuring Tom Misch)	2019	Motivational Music for the Syncopated Soul

=== Other certified songs ===
Title	Year	Certifications	Album
"Beautiful Escape" (Tom Misch featuring Zak Abel)	2015	BPI: Silver	One Hand on the Future EP
"Damselfly" (Loyle Carner featuring Tom Misch)	2017	BPI: Gold	Yesterday's Gone

=== Guest appearances ===
Title	Year	Other performer(s)	Album
"The Last Song"	2014	Carmody	Majestic Casual - Chapter 2
"No Peace"	2015	Alfa Mist	Nocturne
"Beautiful Escape"	2015	Zak Abel	One Hand on the Future EP
"Changing Me"	2015	OthaSoul	The Remedy
"Stay Close"	2016	Barney Artist	Painting Sounds
"Damselfly"	2017	Loyle Carner	Yesterday's Gone
"Fantastic Interlude"	2017	Mecca:83	Loosies, Vol. 2
"Yes, No, Maybe"	2018	Detroit Swindle	High Life
"Me & You"	2018	Honne	Love Me / Love Me Not
"Lullaby"	2018	Barney Artist	Home Is Where the Art Is
"Angel"	2019	Loyle Carner	Not Waving, but Drowning
"Ain't Nobody Know"	2019	Gen Hoshino	Same Thing
"Nobody's Fault"	2021	Benny Sings	Music
"Free"	2023	Joel Culpepper	Non-album single

=== Remixes ===
Title	Year	Artist
"Where I'm From"	2015	Kiko Bun
"What You Don't Do"	2015	Lianne La Havas
"Friends"	2015	Raury
"Midnight Mischief"	2016	Jordan Rakei
"Cold Little Heart"	2017	Michael Kiwanuka
"My Fancy Free Future Love"	2020	Common
