= Yesterday's Gone (Loyle Carner album) =

Studio album by Loyle Carner
- Released: 20 January 2017
- Genres: Hip hop; British hip hop
- Length: 42:48
- Labels: AMF Records; Caroline Records; Virgin EMI
- Producers: Alex Burey; Loyle Carner; Rebel Kleff; Kwes; Misure La VerT; Tom Misch; The Purist; Saul XL; Steven Vengeance

Loyle Carner chronology
Yesterday's Gone (2017)	Not Waving, but Drowning (2019)

Singles from Yesterday's Gone
- 1. "Ain't Nothing Changed" Released: 2015; 2. "Stars & Shards" Released: 2016; 3. "No CD" Released: 2016; 4. "The Isle of Arran" Released: 2016

Professional ratings
Aggregate scores
Source	Rating
AnyDecentMusic?	8.0/10
Metacritic	84/100
Review scores
Source	Rating
DIY	4/5 stars
The Guardian	4/5 stars
NME	4/5 stars
Q	4/5 stars

Yesterday's Gone is the debut studio album by English hip hop artist Loyle Carner. It was released via Virgin EMI Records on 20 January 2017.

== Critical reception ==
Yesterday's Gone received widespread acclaim upon its release. At Metacritic, which assigns a weighted average score out of 100 to reviews from mainstream critics, Yesterday's Gone holds an average score of 84 based on nine reviews, indicating "universal acclaim". NME described the album's style as "confessional, soul-searching, and very very good."

The album was nominated for the 2017 Mercury Prize and included on numerous end-of-year lists, ranking at number one on The Independent's list of the 30 best albums of 2017.

In 2019, "No CD" became the theme tune of the BBC comedy discussion show The Ranganation, hosted by Romesh Ranganathan.

=== Year-end lists ===
Publication	List	Rank	Ref.
Evening Standard	The 10 Best Albums of 2017	10	
The Independent	The 30 Best Albums of 2017	1	
NME	NME's Albums of the Year 2017	12	
RIOT Magazine	RIOT's Albums of the Year 2017	4	
Wonderland Magazine	7 Wonders: Best Albums of 2017	—N/a	

== Track listing ==
Track listing and credits adapted from Tidal and Qobuz.

No.	Title	Writer(s)	Producer(s)	Length
1.	"The Isle of Arran"	Ben Coyle-Larner; Lawrence Lord	The Purist	3:34
2.	"Mean It in the Morning"	B. Coyle-Larner; Kristian Revelle; Brian Bennett^{[b]}	Rebel Kleff; James Dring^{[a]}	2:39
3.	"+44"	B. Coyle-Larner	Loyle Carner	0:48
4.	"Damselfly" (featuring Tom Misch)	B. Coyle-Larner; Tom Misch	Tom Misch	2:52
5.	"Ain't Nothing Changed"	B. Coyle-Larner; Revelle; Piero Umiliani^{[c]}	Rebel Kleff	3:14
6.	"Swear"	B. Coyle-Larner	Loyle Carner	0:34
7.	"Florence" (featuring Kwes)	B. Coyle-Larner; Kwesi Sey	Kwes	3:04
8.	"The Seamstress (Tooting Masala)"	B. Coyle-Larner; Saul Mayne	Saul XL; Dring^{[a]}	2:31
9.	"Stars & Shards"	B. Coyle-Larner; Alex Burey	Alex Burey; Dan Parry^{[a]}	3:04
10.	"No Worries" (featuring Jehst and Rebel Kleff)	B. Coyle-Larner; Revelle; Jack Brown; William Shields; Otis Jackson Jr; Romeo Jiminez; Zach Gill	Rebel Kleff	4:30
11.	"Rebel 101"	B. Coyle-Larner	Loyle Carner	0:28
12.	"No CD" (featuring Rebel Kleff)	B. Coyle-Larner; Revelle	Rebel Kleff; Dring^{[a]}	4:17
13.	"Mrs. C"	B. Coyle-Larner; Sey	Kwes	3:22
14.	"Sun of Jean" (featuring Mum and Dad)	B. Coyle-Larner; Sey; Jean Coyle-Larner; Steven Vengeance^{[d]}	Kwes	5:14
15.	"Yesterday's Gone" (Hidden track)	Misure La VerT; Vengeance	Misure La VerT; Steven Vengeance	2:37
Total length:				42:48

Notes

- ^{^[a]} signifies an additional producer

Sample credits

- "The Isle of Arran" contains a sample of the recording "The Lord Will Make A Way" performed by S.C.I. Youth Choir.
- ^{^[b]}"Mean It in the Morning" contains elements of the song "Ladybird" by Brian Bennett.
- ^{^[c]}"Ain't Nothing Changed" contains a sample of the recording "Ricordandoti" performed by Piero Umiliani.
- ^{^[d]}"Sun of Jean" contains samples of "Drifter" and "This Is The Police", both written and performed by Steven Vengeance.

== Charts ==
Chart	Peak position
Belgian Albums (Ultratop Wallonia)	135
French Albums (SNEP)	171
Swiss Albums (Schweizer Hitparade)	69
UK Albums (OCC)	14

== Certifications ==
Certifications for Yesterday's Gone
Region	Certification	Certified units/sales
United Kingdom (BPI)	Gold	100,000^{‡}
^{‡} Sales+streaming figures based on certification alone.
