= Geography (Tom Misch album) =

Studio album by Tom Misch
- Released: 6 April 2018
- Length: 52:25
- Label: Beyond the Groove
- Producer: Tom Misch

Tom Misch chronology
Beat Tape 2 (2015)	Geography (2018)	What Kinda Music (2020)

Singles from Geography
- 1. "South of the River" Released: 5 July 2017; 2. "Movie" Released: 2 November 2017; 3. "Water Baby" Released: 23 January 2018; 4. "It Runs Through Me" Released: 1 March 2018; 5. "Lost in Paris" Released: 3 April 2018

Geography is the debut studio album by English musician Tom Misch. It was self-released on 6 April 2018 through Misch's own label Beyond the Groove.

== Critical reception ==
Professional ratings
Aggregate scores
Source	Rating
AnyDecentMusic?	6.6/10
Metacritic	73/100
Review scores
Source	Rating
Clash	4/10
The Line of Best Fit	8/10
Mixmag	7/10
Mojo	3/5 stars
musicOMH	3.5/5 stars
NME	4/5 stars
Pitchfork	6.5/10
PopMatters	8/10 stars
The Skinny	3/5 stars
Uncut	8/10

Geography has received generally positive reviews from critics. At Metacritic, which assigns a normalised rating out of 100 to reviews from mainstream publications, the album received an average score of 73, based on 11 reviews.

== Track listing ==
Geography track listing
No.	Title	Writer(s)	Length
1.	"Before Paris"	Tom Misch; Jamie Houghton	2:29
2.	"Lost in Paris" (featuring GoldLink)	Misch; D'Anthony Carlos; Houghton; Jessica Carmody Nathan	3:14
3.	"South of the River"	Misch; Ed Thomas; Carmody Nathan; Tobie Tripp	4:29
4.	"Movie"	Misch; Carmody Nathan	5:57
5.	"Tick Tock"	Misch; Houghton	4:13
6.	"It Runs Through Me" (featuring De La Soul)	Misch; David Jude Jolicoeur; Carmody Nathan; Kelvin Mercer	4:21
7.	"Isn't She Lovely"	Stevie Wonder	1:26
8.	"Disco Yes" (featuring Poppy Ajudha)	Misch; Poppy Ajudha	4:40
9.	"Man Like You"	Patrick Watson; Mishka Stein; Robbie Kuster; Simon Angell	4:41
10.	"Water Baby" (featuring Loyle Carner)	Misch; Benjamin Coyle-Larner; Carmody Nathan; Wilton Felder	4:31
11.	"You're on My Mind"	Misch; Carmody Nathan	4:18
12.	"Cos I Love You"	Misch; Carmody Nathan; Anthony Castellanos	4:13
13.	"We've Come So Far"	Misch	3:53
Total length:			52:25

Notes

- "Before Paris" contains a spoken word sample from a 2011 interview with jazz trumpeter Roy Hargrove.
- "Isn't She Lovely" is a cover of the song of the same name by Stevie Wonder.
- "Man Like You" is a cover of the song of the same name by Patrick Watson.
- "Water Baby" contains a sample of "My Lady", written by Wilton Felder and performed by The Crusaders.
- "South of the River" includes a sample from "Lady" by D’Angelo.
- "Movie"'s intro, performed by Misch's sister Polly, evokes early Hollywood romance films, but was written for the song.

== Personnel ==
Credits adapted from liner notes.

Musicians

- Tom Misch – vocals (2–4, 6, 8–13), guitar (7), instrumentation (13)
- GoldLink – vocals (2)
- De La Soul – vocals (6)
- Poppy Ajudha – vocals (8)
- Loyle Carner – vocals (10)
- Polly Misch – spoken word vocals (4)
- Abbey Smith – additional vocals (3)
- Jessica Carmody Nathan – additional vocals (4, 12)
- Jaz Karis – additional vocals (10, 11)
- Roy Hargrove – spoken word vocal sample (1)
- Jamie Houghton – drums (1,5)
- Tobie Tripp – violin (2–6, 8, 9)
- Johnny Woodham – trumpet (2)
- Reuben James – piano (4, 6, 10)
- Paul Castelluzzo – guitar (7)
- Rob Araujo – additional keyboard (3, 8)

Technical personnel

- Tom Misch – production, mixing
- Lexxx – mixing
- Lewis Hopkin – mastering
- Jarami – co-production (12)
- Carol Misch – artwork

== Charts ==
Chart performance for Geography
Chart (2018)	Peak position
Belgian Albums (Ultratop Flanders)	94
Belgian Albums (Ultratop Wallonia)	190
Dutch Albums (Album Top 100)	29
French Albums (SNEP)	163
German Albums (Offizielle Top 100)	89
Irish Albums (Official Charts)	30
New Zealand Heatseeker Albums (RMNZ)	5
Scottish Albums (Official Charts)	29
Swiss Albums (Schweizer Hitparade)	75
UK Albums (Official Charts)	8
US Heatseekers Albums (Billboard)	17
US Top Jazz Albums (Billboard)	2

== Certifications ==
Certifications for Geography
Region	Certification	Certified units/sales
Denmark (IFPI Danmark)	Gold	10,000^{‡}
United Kingdom (BPI)	Gold	100,000^{‡}
^{‡} Sales+streaming figures based on certification alone.
