= Katie Gregson-MacLeod =

Scottish musician

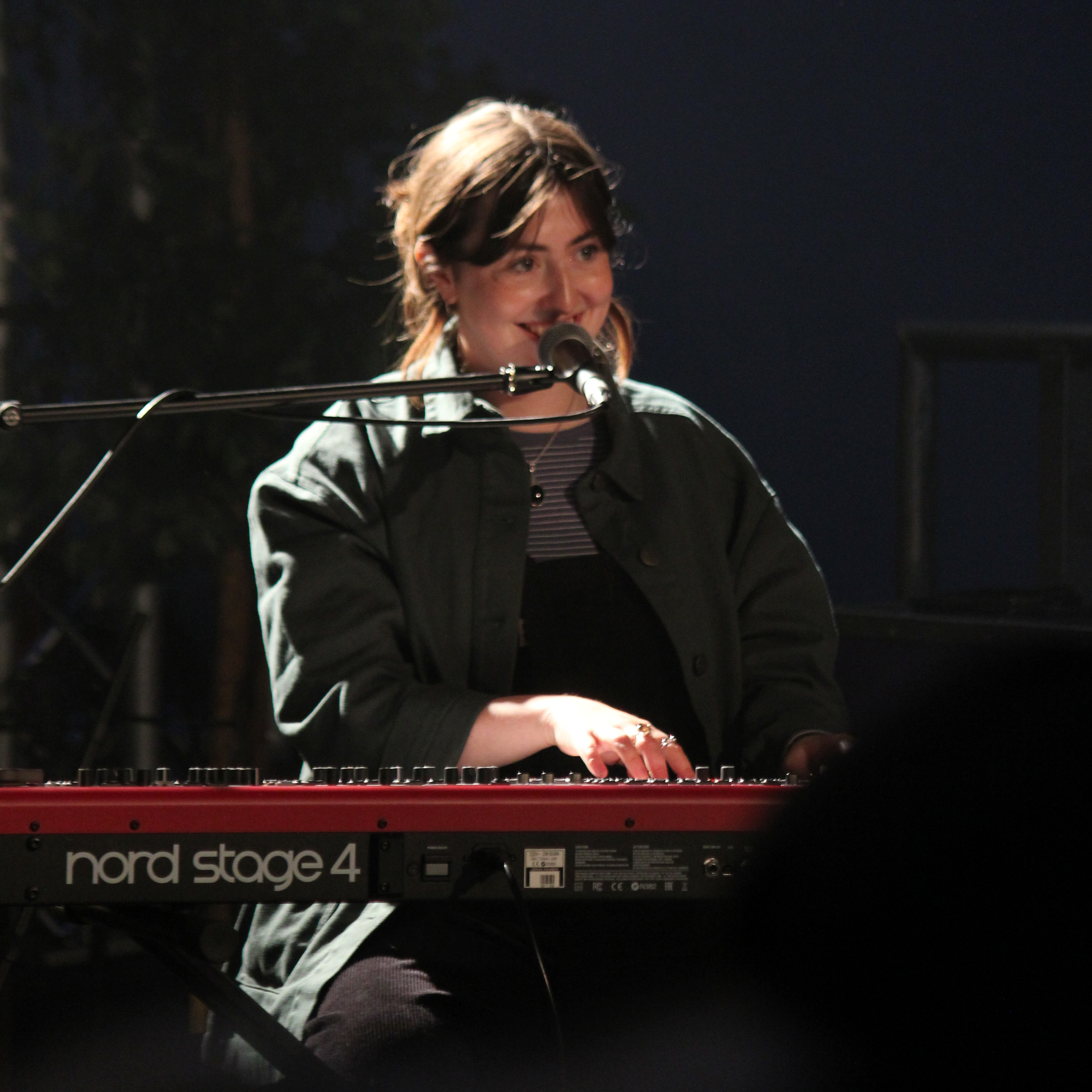
- Gregson-MacLeod performing in 2024

Background information
- Born: 2000 or 2001 (age 24–25)
- Origin: Inverness, Highland, Scotland
- Occupation: Musician
- Instruments: Guitar, piano
- Years active: 2020-present
- Label: Last Recordings On Earth
- Website: www.katie-gregson-macleod.com

Katie Gregson-MacLeod is a Scottish musician. She rose to fame in 2022 when her song "Complex" went viral on TikTok.

== Career ==
Gregson-MacLeod released her first single, “Still a Sad Song” in 2020 when she was 18. In 2021, while attending university, she independently released her debut EP Games I Play with that track.

On August 4, 2022, Gregson-MacLeod posted a short video of part of her song "Complex" on TikTok. Overnight, the clip garnered over 100,000 views. The clip eventually amassed over 7.2 million views. She released a full version of the song later that month. She signed with Columbia Records and released the EP Songs Written for Piano on that label later that year. She was named one of BBC Radio Scotland's 25 Artists to Watch in 2022.

"Complex" was nominated for Best Song Musically and Lyrically at the 2023 Ivor Novello awards. In October 2023, she released her third EP, Big Red. Gregson-MacLeod won the Vega Breakthrough Award at the 2023 Scottish Music Awards.

== Personal life ==
Gregson-MacLeod is from Inverness. She has played music since an early age and began songwriting around age 12. She was a history student at the University of Edinburgh. In 2023, she moved from Inverness to London.

== Discography ==
=== Studio albums ===
- Albatross (2026, Last Recordings on Earth)

=== Extended plays ===
- Games I Play (2021, independent)
- Songs Written For Piano (2022, Columbia Records)
- Big Red (2023, Sony Music)
- Love Me Too Well, I'll Retire Early (2025, Last Recordings on Earth)
