= Hopefully! =

Studio album by Loyle Carner
- Released: 20 June 2025
- Genre: Hip-hop
- Length: 37:44
- Labels: Island EMI
- Producers: Loyle Carner; Aviram Barath; Nick Mills; Harvey Grant; Zach Nahome; EMIL; FloFilz; Nick Hakim

Loyle Carner chronology
Hugo (2022)	Hopefully! (2025)

Singles from Hopefully!
- 1. "All I Need / In My Mind" Released: 9 April 2025; 2. "About Time / Lyin" Released: 6 May 2025; 3. "Time to Go" Released: 16 June 2025

Hopefully! (stylised as hopefully !) is the fourth studio album by English hip-hop artist Loyle Carner. It was released on 20 June 2025 through Virgin EMI Records and features guest appearances from Navy Blue and Nick Hakim.

== Background ==
Hopefully! comes after Loyle Carner's critically acclaimed 2022 album, Hugo. On 9 April 2025, Loyle Carner released the double single "All I Need / In My Mind". On 23 April, he announced the album's title and release date. The following day, he announced a world tour in support of the album.

On 6 May 2025, Loyle Carner released another double single, "About Time / Lyin". The self-directed music video for "Lyin" was released on 20 May 2025. In an interview with Billboard, Loyle Carner discussed how becoming a father of two has shaped his creative process and influenced the themes of fatherhood and personal growth on Hopefully!.

The final single, "Time to Go", was released on 16 June 2025. That same day, the tracklist of the album was revealed.

== Critical reception ==
Professional ratings
Aggregate scores
Source	Rating
AnyDecentMusic?	7.8/10
Metacritic	83/100
Review scores
Source	Rating
AllMusic	3.5/5 stars
Clash	8/10
DIY	4/5 stars
The Guardian	4/5 stars
NME	4/5 stars
The Line of Best Fit	8/10

Upon release, Hopefully! was met with widespread acclaim from music critics. At Metacritic, which assigns a normalised rating out of 100 to reviews from mainstream critics, the album received an average score of 83, based on 9 critical reviews, indicating "universal acclaim".

Peter Martin of DIY called the album "as moving as it is musically satisfying". Writing in The Guardian, Rachel Aroesti described Carner's songwriting as "magical", and said Hopefully! is his "most impressive work to date". Liberty Dunworth of NME wrote that on the album Loyle Carner "broadens his horizons", and that "this isn't just Loyle Carner at his most refined, it is the start of a new chapter". Aimee Phillips of Clash commented that "while 'hopefully!' is thematically rich, it’s not adventurous sonically" and that it "isn't trying to be groundbreaking. It's trying to be honest". Reviewing the album for The Line of Best Fit, Riley Moquin wrote that "vocally, the rapper pushes his boundaries more than perhaps ever before".

== Commercial performance ==
In its first charting week, Hopefully! opened at number-two on the UK Albums Chart with sales of 17,245, marking it his highest-charting album in the country.

== Track listing ==
Hopefully! track listing
No.	Title	Writer(s)	Producer(s)	Length
1.	"Feel at Home"	Aviram Barath; Benjamin Coyle-Larner; Nick Mills; Zach Nahome	Barath; Coyle-Larner; Mills; Nahome	2:34
2.	"In My Mind"	Barath; Coyle-Larner; Finn Carter; Harvey Grant; Joe MacLaren; Mark Mollison; Mills; Richard Spaven	Barath; Coyle-Larner; Mills; Grant	4:09
3.	"All I Need"	Barath; Coyle-Larner; Mills	Barath; Coyle-Larner; Mills	3:33
4.	"Lyin"	Barath; Coyle-Larner; Marla Kether; Mills; Spaven	Barath; Coyle-Larner; Mills; Grant^{[a]}	3:58
5.	"Time to Go"	Coyle-Larner; Carter; MacLaren; Mollison; Mills; Spaven	Barath; Coyle-Larner; Mills; Grant^{[a]}	3:29
6.	"Horcrux"	Barath; Coyle-Larner; Carter; Grant; MacLaren; Mills; Spaven	Barath; Coyle-Larner; Mills; Grant^{[a]}	3:30
7.	"Strangers"	Barath; Coyle-Larner; Grant; Mills; Nahome	Barath; Coyle-Larner; Mills; Nahome; Grant^{[a]}	2:35
8.	"Hopefully !" (with Benjamin Zephaniah)	Barath; Coyle-Larner; Grant; Mills; Nahome	Barath; Coyle-Larner; Mills; Nahome; Grant^{[a]}; Romil Hemnani^{[a]}	2:51
9.	"Purpose" (with Navy Blue)	Coyle-Larner; Sage Elsesser	Barath; Coyle-Larner; EMIL; FloFilz; Mills; Grant^{[a]}	3:17
10.	"Don't Fix It" (with Nick Hakim)	Barath; Coyle-Larner; Nick Hakim; Mills	Barath; Coyle-Larner; Hakim; Mills	4:24
11.	"About Time"	Barath; Coyle-Larner; Mills	Barath; Coyle-Larner; Mills; Grant^{[a]}	3:18
Total length:				37:44

=== Notes ===
- ^{^[a]} signifies an additional producer.
- All track titles are stylised in all lowercase.
- "Hopefully !" samples a clip of Benjamin Zephaniah's speech on the Brixton riots.

== Personnel ==
Credits adapted from Tidal.

=== Musicians ===
- Loyle Carner – vocals
- Aviram Barath – synthesizer (tracks 1–8, 10, 11), piano (1–3, 5, 8), background vocals (2), drum machine (3, 6), vocals (3, 11); bass guitar, glockenspiel (7); Mellotron (10), guitar (11)
- Calum Duncan – guitar (1, 3), bass guitar (1)
- Zach Nahome – programming (1), guitar (7)
- Harvey Grant – sampler (2, 8), background vocals (2), synthesizer (3–8, 11), vocals (6), guitar (7), saxophone (8)
- Richard Spaven – drums (2–6, 11), background vocals (2)
- Finn Carter – background vocals, Rhodes (2); synthesizer (5), piano (6, 11)
- Mark Mollison – guitar (2, 3, 5), background vocals (2)
- Joe MacLaren – bass guitar (2, 5, 6), background vocals (2)
- Nick Mills – guitar (3, 4, 7, 8, 11), Rhodes (3), background vocals (8), synthesizer (10)
- Marla Kether – bass guitar (3, 4)
- Imraan Peleker – guitar (3, 4)
- Rosie Lowe – background vocals (4, 9), vocals (6, 11)
- Puma Blue – background vocals (5)
- Benjamin Zephaniah – spoken word (8)
- Navy Blue – vocals (9)
- Nick Hakim – guitar, Mellotron, vocals (10)
- Yves Fernandez – bass guitar (11)

=== Technical ===
- Lexxx – mixing
- Nick Mills – mixing (1, 4–11), engineering (all tracks)
- Matt Colton – mastering
- Neil Goody – engineering (3), engineering assistance (1, 2, 6–9, 11)
- Dan Cox – engineering (3–5), engineering assistance (6–9, 11)
- Aviram Barath – engineering (10)
- Ary Maudit – engineering assistance (6)
- Liam Weiland – engineering assistance (7, 8)
- Katie Foreman – engineering assistance (7)
- Jack Manning – engineering assistance (10)

== Charts ==
Chart performance for Hopefully!
Chart (2025)	Peak position
Australian Albums (ARIA)	43
Australian Hip Hop/R&B Albums (ARIA)	7
Belgian Albums (Ultratop Flanders)	5
Belgian Albums (Ultratop Wallonia)	150
Dutch Albums (Album Top 100)	13
German Albums (Offizielle Top 100)	17
Irish Albums (IRMA)	52
New Zealand Albums (RMNZ)	29
Scottish Albums (Official Charts)	4
Swiss Albums (Schweizer Hitparade)	31
UK Albums (Official Charts)	2
UK R&B Albums (Official Charts)	1
