= Origin (Jordan Rakei album) =

Studio album by Jordan Rakei
- Released: 14 June 2019
- Genre: Neo soul; R&B
- Length: 43:32
- Label: Ninja Tune

Jordan Rakei chronology
Wallflower (2017)	Origin (2019)	Small Moments (2020)

Singles from Origin
- 1. "Signs" Released: 19 February 2020

Origin is the third studio album by New Zealand-Australian singer-songwriter Jordan Rakei. It was released on 14 June 2019 on Ninja Tune, with a deluxe edition released on 13 March 2020. The album explores themes of digital dystopia and the impacts of technology on humanity.

== Background and release ==
Origin was released two years after Rakei's previous album Wallflower (2017). Written over the course of two months, each track on the album tackles a different effect that technology can have on the human experience, including virtual and augmented reality, simulation theory, brain–computer interfaces, and the technological singularity. Rakei cites dystopian television series Black Mirror and The Handmaid's Tale, as well as the Yuval Noah Harari book Sapiens, as thematic inspirations for the album.

The deluxe version of Origin, released nine months after the album's initial release, includes a version of the track "Signs" featuring American rapper Common, whom Rakei met while on tour and cites as one of his "favourite rappers of all time".

In January 2020, Rakei performed three songs from the album in a Tiny Desk Concert for NPR Music.

== Critical reception ==
Professional ratings
Aggregate scores
Source	Rating
Metacritic	75/100
Review scores
Source	Rating
Clash	8/10
Exclaim!	8/10
The Line of Best Fit	7.5/10
MusicOMH	3.5/5 stars
PopMatters	9/10

Origin was met with positive reviews. At Metacritic, the album received an aggregate score of 75 based on 7 reviews, indicating "generally favorable reviews".

In a review for The Guardian, writer Tara Joshi called Origin a marked improvement over Rakei's first two studio albums, describing it as "full of a rich, cinematic musicality that feels poppier, sparklier and more breezily ambitious." PopMatters reviewer Paul Carr similarly lauded the album, dubbing it a "neo-soul masterclass" that is a "vibrant and deftly blended mix of smooth jazz, classic soul, and cool funk with a sprinkling of 1990s R&B and hip-hop." Reviewers have also praised Rakei's soulful vocals and lush, groovy, jazz-inflected production, as well as his lyrical commentary on the effects of technology on the human experience.

== Track listing ==
Origin track listing
No.	Title	Length
1.	"Mad World"	3:15
2.	"Say Something"	2:40
3.	"Mind's Eye"	4:06
4.	"Rolling Into One"	4:19
5.	"Oasis"	4:20
6.	"Wildfire"	4:08
7.	"Signs"	2:59
8.	"You & Me"	4:14
9.	"Moda"	2:56
10.	"Speak"	4:47
11.	"Mantra"	5:48
Total length:		43:32

Origin (Deluxe Edition) bonus tracks
No.	Title	Length
1.	"Borderline"	4:15
2.	"Signs" (featuring Common)	4:15
3.	"Always Coming"	3:47
4.	"Speak – Live Piano Session"	4:37
5.	"Best Part – BBC Maida Vale Session"	3:23
6.	"Mind's Eye – The Pool Session"	7:10
7.	"You & Me – KCRW Session"	4:30
8.	"Mad World – The Pool Session"	5:55
9.	"Mantra – The Pool Session"	6:07
10.	"Rolling Into One – The Pool Session"	4:33
Total length:		48:32
