= Sound of... =

Annual BBC music poll

- Awarded for: Most promising new music talent
- Country: United Kingdom
- Presented by: BBC Radio 1
- First award: 2003; 23 years ago
- Currently held by: Skye Newman (2026)
- Website: bbc.co.uk/soundof

Television/radio coverage
- Network: BBC

Sound of... is an annual BBC poll of music critics and industry figures to find the most promising new music talent. It was first conducted by the BBC News website in 2003, and is now widely covered by the corporation's online, radio and TV outlets, as well as other media. A 10-strong longlist is published each December, with a ranked shortlist and annual winner announced the following January.

== Winners ==
=== 2000s ===
Year	Edition	Winner	Runner-up	Third	Fourth	Fifth	Sixth	Seventh	Eighth	Ninth	Tenth
2003	1	50 Cent	Electric Six	Yeah Yeah Yeahs	The Thrills	Dizzee Rascal	Interpol	Audio Bullys	Mario	The Datsuns	Sean Paul
2004	2	Keane	Franz Ferdinand	Wiley	Razorlight	Joss Stone	McFly	Scissor Sisters	The Ordinary Boys	Tali	Gemma Fox
2005	3	The Bravery	Bloc Party	Kano	The Game	Kaiser Chiefs	KT Tunstall	The Dead 60s	The Dears	Tom Vek	The Magic Numbers
2006	4	Corinne Bailey Rae	Clap Your Hands Say Yeah	The Feeling	Plan B	gUiLLeMoTs	Sway	Chris Brown	Marcos Hernandez	Kubb	The Automatic
2007	5	MIKA	The Twang	Klaxons	Sadie Ama	Enter Shikari	Air Traffic	Cold War Kids	Just Jack	Ghosts	The Rumble Strips
2008 (Note: The other nominees for the 2008 award, in place order from 11th to 20th, were Ida Maria, One Night Only, Alphabeat, Laura Marling, Cajun Dance Party, The Courteeners, Gabriella Cilmi, Late of the Pier, Black Mountain and Lil Wayne)	6	Adele	Duffy	The Ting Tings	Glasvegas	Foals	Vampire Weekend	Joe Lean & the Jing Jang Jong	Black Kids	MGMT	Santigold
2009 (Note: The other nominees for the 2009 award were Frankmusik, Master Shortie, Mumford & Sons, The Big Pink and The Temper Trap)	7	Little Boots	White Lies	Florence + the Machine	Empire of the Sun	La Roux	Lady Gaga	V V Brown	Kid Cudi	Passion Pit	Dan Black

=== 2010s ===
Year	Edition	Winner	Runner-up	Third	Fourth	Fifth	Other nominees
2010	8	Ellie Goulding	Marina and the Diamonds	Delphic	Hurts	The Drums	Daisy Dares You, Devlin, Everything Everything, Giggs, Gold Panda, Joy Orbison, Owl City, Rox, Stornoway, Two Door Cinema Club
2011	9	Jessie J	James Blake	The Vaccines	Jamie Woon	Clare Maguire	Anna Calvi, Daley, Esben and the Witch, Jai Paul, MONA, NERO, The Naked and Famous, Warpaint, Wretch 32, Yuck
2012	10	Michael Kiwanuka	Frank Ocean	Azealia Banks	Skrillex	Niki & the Dove	ASAP Rocky, Dot Rotten, Dry the River, Flux Pavilion, Friends, Jamie N Commons, Lianne La Havas, Ren Harvieu, Spector, Stooshe
2013	11	HAIM	AlunaGeorge	Angel Haze	Laura Mvula	CHVRCHΞS	A*M*E, Arlissa, King Krule, Kodaline, Little Green Cars, Palma Violets, Peace, Savages, The Weeknd, Tom Odell
2014	12	Sam Smith	Ella Eyre	BANKS	Sampha	George Ezra	Chance the Rapper, Chlöe Howl, FKA twigs, Jungle, Kelela, Luke Sital-Singh, MNEK, Nick Mulvey, Royal Blood, Say Lou Lou
2015	13	Years & Years	James Bay	Stormzy	Raury	George the Poet	Kwabs, Låpsley, Novelist, Rae Morris, Shamir, Shura, Slaves, SOAK, Sunset Sons, Wolf Alice
2016	14	Jack Garratt	Alessia Cara	NAO	Blossoms	Mura Masa, WSTRN (Note: Both artists were announced in fifth place on 4 January 2016)	Billie Marten, Dua Lipa, Frances, Izzy Bizu, J Hus, Loyle Carner, Mabel, RAT BOY, Section Boyz
2017	15	Ray BLK	Rag'n'Bone Man	Raye	Jorja Smith	Nadia Rose	AJ Tracey, Anderson .Paak, Cabbage, Dave, Declan McKenna, Maggie Rogers, Stefflon Don, The Amazons, The Japanese House, Tom Grennan
2018	16	Sigrid	Rex Orange County	IAMDDB	Khalid	Pale Waves	ALMA, Billie Eilish, Jade Bird, Lewis Capaldi, Nilüfer Yanya, Not3s, Sam Fender, Superorganism, Tom Walker, yaeji, Yxng Bane
2019	17	Octavian	King Princess	Grace Carter	slowthai	ROSALÍA	Dermot Kennedy, Ella Mai, FLOHIO, Mahalia, Sea Girls

=== 2020s ===
Year	Edition	Winner	Runner-up	Third	Fourth	Fifth	Other nominees
2020	18	Celeste	easy life	YUNGBLUD	Joy Crookes	Inhaler	Arlo Parks, beabadoobee, Georgia, Joesef, Squid
2021	19	Pa Salieu	Holly Humberstone	BERWYN	Greentea Peng	Griff	Alfie Templeman, Bree Runway, Dutchavelli, girl in red, The Lathums
2022	20	PinkPantheress	Wet Leg	Mimi Webb	Lola Young	Central Cee	Baby Queen, ENNY, Priya Ragu, Tems, Yard Act
2023	21	FLO	Fred again..	Nia Archives	Cat Burns	Gabriels	Asake, Biig Piig, DYLAN, piri & tommy, Rachel Chinouriri
2024	22	The Last Dinner Party	Olivia Dean	Peggy Gou	Tyla	Elmiene	Ayra Starr, Caity Baser, CMAT, Kenya Grace, Sekou
2025	23	Chappell Roan	Ezra Collective	Barry Can't Swim	Myles Smith	English Teacher	Confidence Man, Doechii, Good Neighbours, KNEECAP, Mk.gee, Pozer
2026	24	Skye Newman	Jim Legxacy	sombr	Geese	Royel Otis	Alessi Rose, Chloe Qisha, Florence Road, kwn, Sasha Keable
2027	25						TBA

== Sound of 2009 ==
More than 130 critics, editors and broadcasters took part in the Sound of 2009 survey, which was won by electro-pop singer Little Boots. For the first time, a longlist of 15 acts from the 2009 poll was published by the BBC on 5 December 2008. The other five acts on the longlist were Frankmusik, Master Shortie, Mumford & Sons, The Big Pink and The Temper Trap.

== Sound of 2010 ==
The longlist for the Sound of 2010 poll was revealed on 7 December 2009. The acts nominated were Daisy Dares You, Delphic, Devlin, Ellie Goulding, Everything Everything, Giggs, Gold Panda, Hurts, Joy Orbison, Marina and the Diamonds, Owl City, Rox, Stornoway, The Drums and Two Door Cinema Club. On 8 January 2010, Ellie Goulding was announced as the winner. She has since gone to reach No. 1 with her debut album Lights.

== Sound of 2011 ==
The longlist for the Sound of 2011 poll was revealed on 6 December 2010. The acts nominated were Anna Calvi, Clare Maguire, Daley, Esben and the Witch, Jai Paul, James Blake, Jamie Woon, Jessie J, MONA, NERO, The Naked and Famous, The Vaccines, Warpaint, Wretch 32 and Yuck. On 7 January 2011, Jessie J was announced as the winner.

== Sound of 2012 ==
The longlist for the Sound of 2012 poll was revealed on 5 December 2011. The acts nominated were ASAP Rocky, Azealia Banks, Dot Rotten, Dry The River, Flux Pavilion, Frank Ocean, Friends, Jamie N Commons, Lianne La Havas, Michael Kiwanuka, Niki & the Dove, Ren Harvieu, Skrillex, Spector and Stooshe. On 6 January 2012, Michael Kiwanuka was announced as the winner.

== Sound of 2013 ==
The longlist for the Sound of 2013 poll was revealed on 9 December 2012. The acts nominated were AlunaGeorge, A*M*E, Angel Haze, Arlissa, CHVRCHΞS, HAIM, King Krule, Kodaline, Laura Mvula, Little Green Cars, Palma Violets, Peace, Savages, the Weeknd and Tom Odell. On 4 January 2013, HAIM were announced as the winners on Radio 1 by Huw Stephens.

== Sound of 2014 ==
The longlist for the Sound of 2014 poll was revealed on 2 December 2013. The acts nominated were Banks, Chance the Rapper, Chlöe Howl, Ella Eyre, George Ezra, FKA twigs, Jungle, Kelela, Luke Sital-Singh, MNEK, Nick Mulvey, Royal Blood, Sam Smith, Sampha and Say Lou Lou. On 10 January 2014, Sam Smith was announced as the winner on Radio 1 by Nick Grimshaw.

== Sound of 2015 ==
The longlist for the Sound of 2015 poll was revealed on 1 December 2014. The acts nominated were George the Poet, James Bay, Kwabs, Låpsley, Novelist, Rae Morris, Raury, Shamir, Shura, Slaves, SOAK, Stormzy, Sunset Sons, Wolf Alice and Years & Years. On 9 January 2015, Years & Years were announced as the winners on Radio 1 by Huw Stephens.

== Sound of 2016 ==
The longlist for the Sound of 2016 poll was revealed on 30 November 2015. The acts nominated were Alessia Cara, Billie Marten, Blossoms, Dua Lipa, Frances, Izzy Bizu, Jack Garratt, J Hus, Loyle Carner, Mabel, Mura Masa, NAO, RAT BOY, Section Boyz and WSTRN. On 8 January 2016, Jack Garratt was announced as the winner.

== Sound of 2017 ==
The longlist for the Sound of 2017 poll was revealed on 28 November 2016. The acts nominated were AJ Tracey, Anderson .Paak, CABBAGE, Dave, Declan McKenna, Jorja Smith, Maggie Rogers, Nadia Rose, Rag'n'Bone Man, Ray BLK, Raye, Stefflon Don, The Amazons, The Japanese House and Tom Grennan. On 6 January 2017, Ray BLK was announced as the winner on Radio 1 by Clara Amfo.

== Sound of 2018 ==
The longlist for the Sound of 2018 was revealed on 27 November 2017. The acts nominated were ALMA, Billie Eilish, IAMDDB, Jade Bird, Khalid, Lewis Capaldi, Nilüfer Yanya, Not3s, Pale Waves, Rex Orange County, Sam Fender, Sigrid, Superorganism, Tom Walker, yaeji and Yxng Bane. On 12 January 2018, Sigrid was announced as the winner on Radio 1 by Clara Amfo.

== Sound of 2019 ==
The longlist for the Sound of 2019 was revealed on 10 December 2018. The acts nominated were Dermot Kennedy, Ella Mai, FLOHIO, Grace Carter, King Princess, Mahalia, Octavian, ROSALÍA, Sea Girls and slowthai. This is the first longlist since the Sound of 2007 to feature only 10 acts. On 11 January 2019, Octavian was announced as the winner by Annie Mac, making him the first rapper to win the longlist since 50 Cent in 2003. He was also the first winner since 2009 to be signed not with Universal Music Group, with which all winners of Sound of... since 2010 were signed at the time of awarding - Octavian is signed with Black Butter, which is partially owned by Universal's competitor, Sony Music.

== Sound of 2020 ==
The longlist for the Sound of 2020 was revealed on 12 December 2019. The acts nominated were Arlo Parks, beabadoobee, Celeste, easy life, Georgia, Inhaler, Joesef, Joy Crookes, Squid and YUNGBLUD. On 9 January 2020, Celeste was announced as the winner.

== Sound of 2021 ==
The longlist for the Sound of 2021 was revealed on 7 December 2020. The acts nominated were Alfie Templeman, BERWYN, Bree Runway, Dutchavelli, girl in red, Greentea Peng, Griff, Holly Humberstone, Pa Salieu and The Lathums. On 7 January 2021, Pa Salieu was announced as the winner on Radio 1 by Annie Mac.

== Sound of 2022 ==
The longlist for the Sound of 2022 was revealed on 6 December 2021. The acts nominated were Baby Queen, Central Cee, ENNY, Lola Young, Mimi Webb, PinkPantheress, Priya Ragu, Tems, Wet Leg, and Yard Act. On 6 January 2022, PinkPantheress was announced as the winner by Jack Saunders.

== Sound of 2023 ==
The longlist for the Sound of 2023 was revealed on December 5, 2022. The acts nominated were Asake, Biig Piig, Cat Burns, DYLAN, FLO, Fred again.., Gabriels, Nia Archives, piri & tommy and Rachel Chinouriri. On 5 January 2023, FLO were announced as the winners by Stormzy and Jack Saunders, making them the first female group to win the longlist since HAIM in 2013.

== Sound of 2024 ==
The longlist for the Sound of 2024 was revealed on 4 December 2023. The acts nominated were Ayra Starr, Caity Baser, CMAT, Elmiene, Kenya Grace, Olivia Dean, Peggy Gou, Sekou, The Last Dinner Party, and Tyla. On 5 January 2024, The Last Dinner Party were announced as the winners by Florence Welch and Jack Saunders.

== Sound of 2025 ==
The longlist for the Sound of 2025 was revealed on 21 November 2024. The acts nominated were Barry Can't Swim, Chappell Roan, Confidence Man, Doechii, English Teacher, Ezra Collective, Good Neighbours, KNEECAP, Mk.gee, Myles Smith, and Pozer. On 10 January 2025, Chappell Roan was announced as the winner.

== Sound of 2026 ==
The longlist for the Sound of 2026 was revealed on 1 December 2025. The acts nominated were Alessi Rose, Chloe Qisha, Florence Road, Geese, Jim Legxacy, kwn, Royel Otis, Sasha Keable, Skye Newman, and sombr. On 9 January 2026, Skye Newman was announced as the winner.

== Sound of 2027 ==
The longlist for the Sound of 2027 will be unveiled on 1 December 2026.

== Criticism ==
It has been commented upon that the Sound of... survey creates a self-fulfilling prophecy, because the BBC has a significant amount of control on who becomes a "breakthrough act". And by adding the nominated acts to their radio playlists, they are guaranteeing some level of fame.

Guardian critic Kitty Empire wrote in December 2007, "Many of us are editors commissioning, and journalists writing, our own ones-to-watch forecasts. In order not to look like idiots, we tend to tip acts with records coming out rather than some lad with a tin whistle we found on MySpace."

The same issue was again raised in 2011, upon the publication of the longlist for the Sound of 2012. The Daily Telegraph's Joe Burgis wrote, "The Sound of 2012 project faces criticism that it is too heavily weighted in favour of mainstream performers."

The head of music at BBC Radio 1 and 1Xtra response to the question was "The list will inspire debate for sure, but most importantly, it will lead to discovery of artists and musicians trying to stand out from the ever-expanding crowd, and that can only be a good thing".

Upon the publication of the Sound of 2025 longlist, Clash's Robin Murray criticised the longlist that comprises artists who have already achieved success such as festival headliners and Mercury Prize winners instead of new artists who haven't had a breakthrough.

This was due to a change in the eligibility criteria, which states that artists could not have had more than two UK top 10 albums or two UK top 10 singles by 30 September 2024.
