= Joesef =

Scottish singer

- Born: Joseph Traynor; 10 July 1995 (age 31); Garthamlock, Glasgow, Scotland
- Genres: Downtempo; electropop
- Occupations: Singer; songwriter
- Years active: 2019–present

Joseph Traynor, known professionally as Joesef, is a Scottish singer from Glasgow.

== Musical career ==
Joesef was born on 10 July 1995 and raised in Garthamlock, in the east end of Glasgow. Before his musical career, he had attended college before dropping out to work as a bartender. He played his first show at King Tut's Wah Wah Hut in 2019 after only releasing clips of his music online. In 2019, he won Best Breakthrough Artist at the Scottish Music Awards. He moved to London at the end of 2020. In 2020, Joesef was included on the long list for the BBC's Sound of 2020 prize. In 2021, his EP Does It Make You Feel Good? was nominated for the Scottish Album of the Year Award.

His debut album, Permanent Damage, a 13-track LP, was released on 13 January 2023.

=== Influences ===
Joesef has described his musical influences as including Tyler, the Creator, The Cure, A Tribe Called Quest and Arlo Parks, the latter of whom he has supported on her international tour. Elton John has expressed his enjoyment of Joesef's music.

== Personal life ==
Joesef is bisexual, and in 2022 was included in a Times Square billboard campaign supporting LGBTQ+ artists. He has two older brothers.

== Discography ==
Studio albums

- Permanent Damage (2023)

Extended plays

- Play Me Something Nice (2019)
- Does It Make You Feel Good? (2020)
- Late To The Party (2021)

Singles

- "Limbo" (2019)
- "Loverboy" (2019)
- "Don't Give In" (2019)
- "Think That I Don't Need Your Love" (2020)
- "The Sun Is Up Forever" (2020)
- "I Wonder Why" (featuring Loyle Carner) (2020)
- "Does It Make You Feel Good?" (2020)
- "Fire" (2021)
- "It's Been a Little Heavy Lately" (2022)
- "East End Coast" (2022)
- "Joe" (2022)
- "Just Come Home with Me Tonight" (2022)
- "Borderline" (2023)
- "Let's Stay Together" (2023)
- "Cynical" (2024)
- "Stephanie's Place" (2025)
- "Separate" (2026)
- "Pacify" (2026)
