= Jordan Rakei =

New Zealand–Australian musician (born 1992)

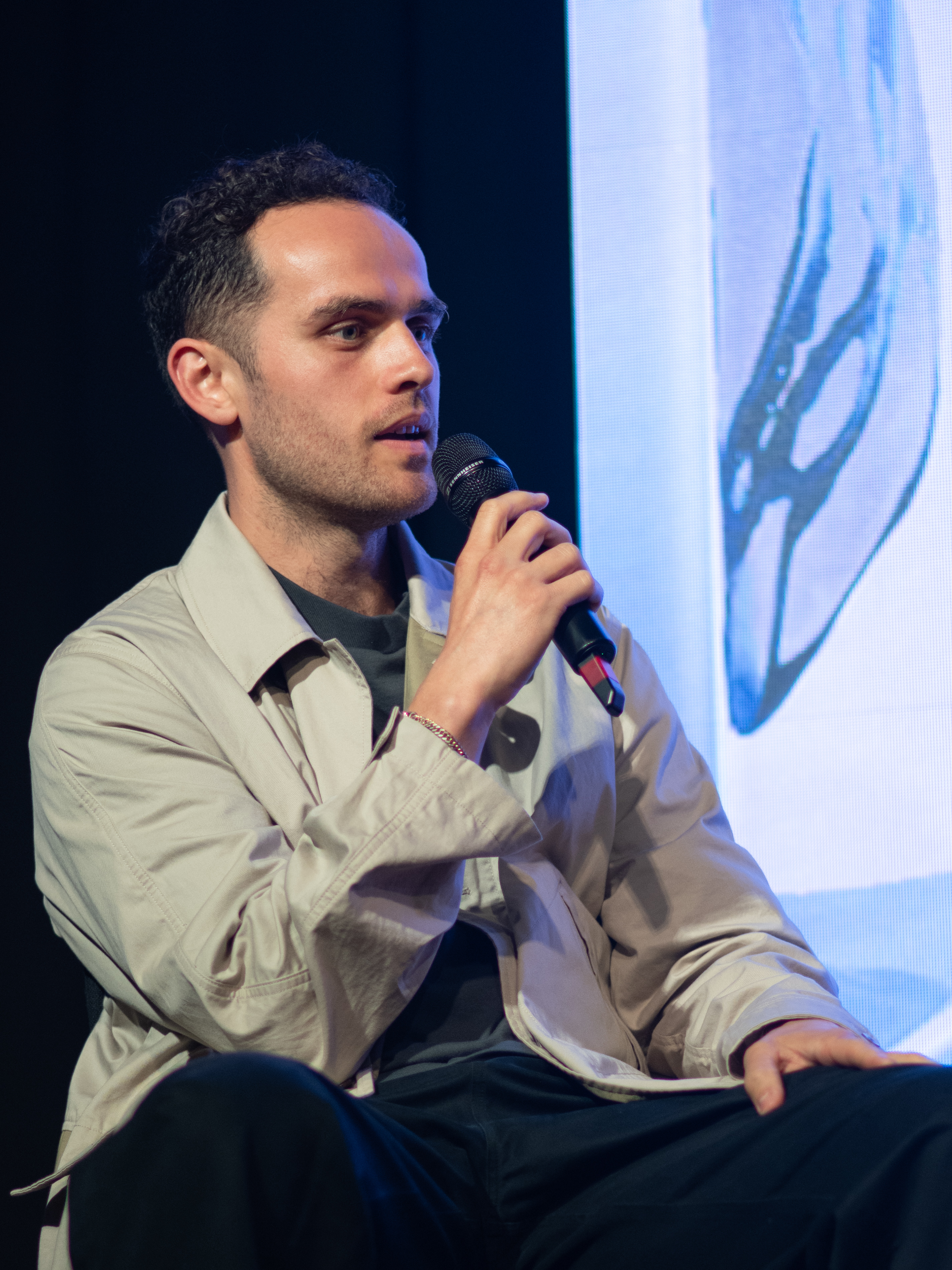
- Rakei at SXSW London 2025

Background information
- Also known as: Dan Kye
- Born: May 23, 1992 (age 34); Tokoroa, Waikato, New Zealand
- Origin: Brisbane, Queensland, Australia
- Genres: Soul; jazz; alternative R&B; trip hop
- Occupations: Musician; singer; songwriter; record producer
- Instruments: Vocals; keyboards; guitar
- Years active: 2013–present
- Labels: 4101; Ninja Tune; Decca Records
- Website: jordanrakei.com

Jordan Rakei (born 23 May 1992) is a New Zealand–Australian musician, singer, songwriter and record producer currently based in London, England. Rakei has also released and performed under the moniker Dan Kye.

== Early life ==
Rakei was born in 1992 in Tokoroa, in the Waikato of New Zealand's North Island, to a Pākehā mother and a Cook Islands Māori father. At the age of three, Rakei and his family moved to Brisbane, Australia. He lived in Brisbane until he made the move to London in 2015.

== Music career ==
=== 2013–2016: Early career and debut album ===
Rakei's first releases were Live at Recording Oasis and Franklin's Room EPs in 2013, self-released, aged 21 years old. Less than a year later in 2014, Rakei releases, Groove Curse EP, was the first release on the Soul Has No Tempo label. Less than a year after this EP, he made the move to London.

After working with artists such as FKJ and Tom Misch, in December 2015 he was part of a Grammy nomination for his work on Disclosure's track "Masterpiece", released on their 2015 album Caracal.

Rakei released his debut album Cloak through his own label, 4101 Records on 3 June 2016. Later that year, he unveiled his dancefloor alias Dan Kye, and released his first EP, titled Joy, Ease, Lightness, on Rhythm Section records.

=== 2017–2020: Wallflower and subsequent releases ===
On 6 June 2017, it was announced that Rakei had signed to Ninja Tune records and would be releasing his next album with them. With this announcement came the release of his new single "Sorceress". Later that month, he made his Glastonbury Festival live debut on the Pussy Parlure stage.

On 22 September 2017, Wallflower was released on Ninja Tune. Wallflower was later shortlisted for Best Australian Album in the 2017 Australian Music Prize.

A tour of North America in spring 2018 included a performance at SXSW Festival and a live session for Jason Bentley's radio show on KCRW.

In 2018, Rakei released the single "Wildfire", released on 10 May 2018, and also provided the vocals on the 2018 Nightmares on Wax track "Typical".

On 26 February 2019, Rakei released "Mind's Eye", the first single from his then unannounced third album. On 23 April 2019, Rakei announced this new album, titled Origin, and released a new single from it, "Say Something". The album was released on 14 June 2019. Rakei supported the record with a series on music festival dates in Summer 2019 and then began a subsequent world tour, beginning that August in Brisbane and ending in November 2019 in Brooklyn, New York. During the tour, he recorded a set for NPR Music's "Tiny Desk Concerts" series which was published online on 13 January 2020.

=== 2021–present: What We Call Life and The Loop ===
In September 2021, Rakei's fourth studio album What We Call Life was released, preceded by four singles. Rakei said the album is his "most vulnerable and intimate album to date"; something that he attributes to listening to singer-songwriters like Laura Marling, Scott Matthews, Joni Mitchell and John Martyn while writing the record.

In January 2024, Rakei announced that his fifth studio album, The Loop, would be released on 10 May of the same year.

== Personal life ==
Rakei is married to Amy Rakei, a Psychology Researcher at Goldsmiths University of London. They have a son and reside in London.

== Discography ==
=== Albums ===
Title	Details	Peak chart positions
Title	Details	UK
Cloak	Released: 3 June 2016; Label: 4101 / Soul Has No Tempo (SHNT002); Format: Digital download, CD, LP	—
Wallflower	Released: 22 September 2017; Label: Ninja Tune (ZEN245); Format: Digital download, CD, 2×LP, streaming	—
Origin	Released: 14 June 2019; Label: Ninja Tune (ZEN256); Format: Digital download, CD, LP, streaming	—
What We Call Life	Released: 17 September 2021; Label: Ninja Tune (ZEN276); Format: Digital download, CD, LP, streaming	54
The Loop	Released: 10 May 2024; Label: Decca Records; Format: Digital download, CD, LP, streaming	36
A Safe Place to Be Wild	Released: 19 February 2027; Label: Jordan Rakei, Universal; Format: Digital download, CD, streaming	tba

=== Compilation albums ===
Title	Details
Late Night Tales: Jordan Rakei	Released: 9 March 2021; Format: Digital download, CD, LP, streaming

=== Extended plays ===
Title	Details
Live at Recording Oasis	Released: 19 September 2013; Label: Jordan Rakei; Format: Digital download
Franklin's Room	Released: 26 September 2013; Label: Jordan Rakei; Format: Digital download
Groove Curse	Released: 15 August 2014; Label: 4101/ Soul Has No Tempo (SHNT001); Format: Digital download, 12" Vinyl
Live at Metropolis Studios	Released: 21 November 2021; Label: Ninja Tune; Format: Digital download
Bruises	Released: 4 March 2022; Label: Ninja Tune; Format: Digital download
Between Us	Released: 24 April 2026; Label: Jordan Rakei, Universal Music; Format: Digital download

== Awards and nominations ==
=== AIR Awards ===
The Australian Independent Record Awards (commonly known informally as AIR Awards) is an annual awards night to recognise, promote and celebrate the success of Australia's Independent Music sector.

Year	Nominee / work	Award	Result
2020	Origin	Best Independent Soul/R&B Album or EP	Nominated

=== APRA Awards ===
The APRA Awards are held in Australia and New Zealand by the Australasian Performing Right Association to recognise songwriting skills, sales and airplay performance by its members annually.

Year	Nominee / work	Award	Result	Ref.
2023	"Send My Love"	Most Performed R&B / Soul Work	Nominated	

=== Australian Music Prize ===
The Australian Music Prize (the AMP) is an annual award of $30,000 given to an Australian band or solo artist in recognition of the merit of an album released during the year of award. They commenced in 2005.

Year	Nominee / work	Award	Result	Ref.
2017	Wallflower	Australian Music Prize	Nominated	

=== J Awards ===
The J Awards are an annual series of Australian music awards that were established by the Australian Broadcasting Corporation's youth-focused radio station Triple J. They commenced in 2005.

Year	Nominee / work	Award	Result	Ref.
2016	himself	Double J Artist of the Year	Nominated	
