= Kali Uchis discography =

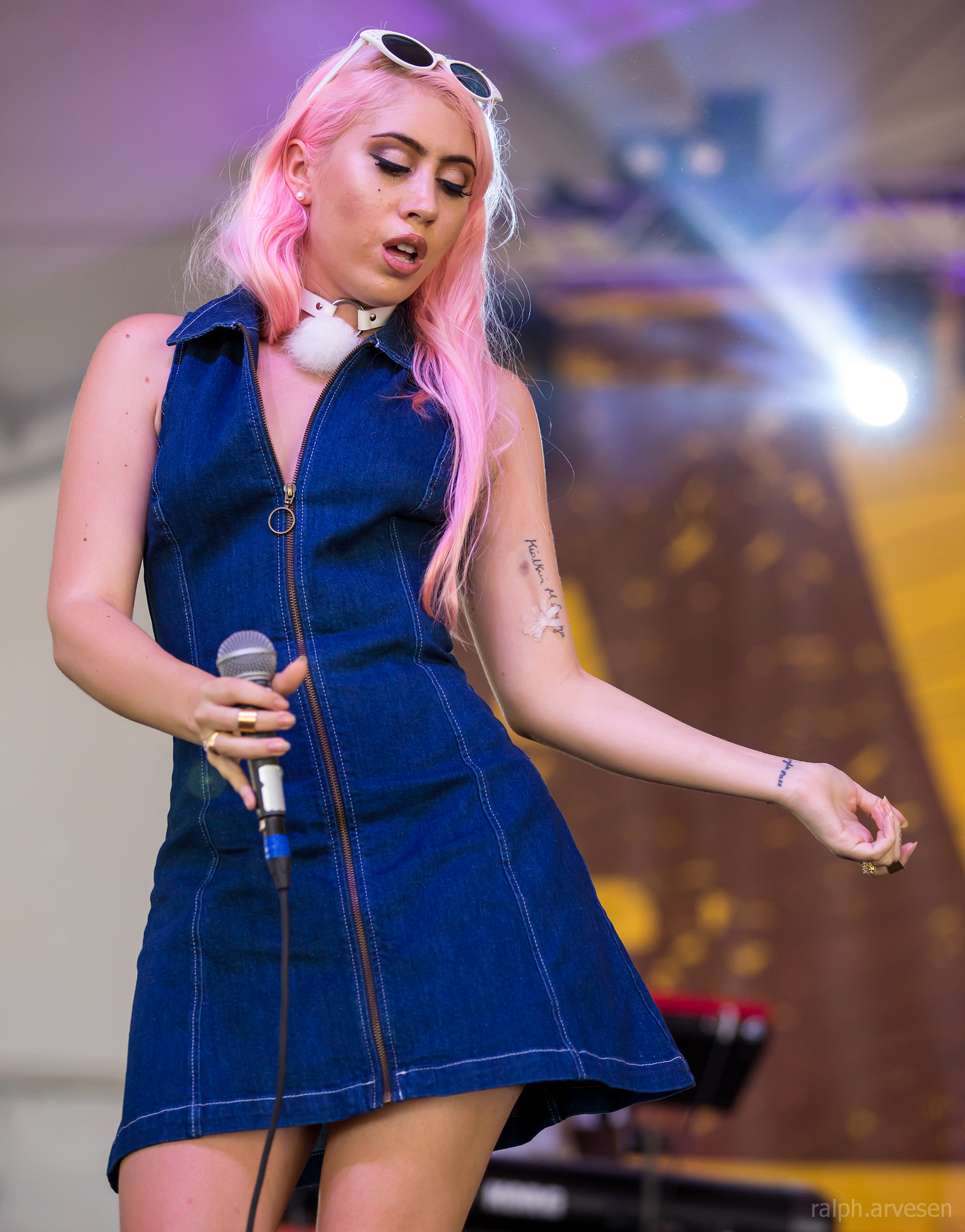
- Kali Uchis performing at Austin City Limits Music Festival in Austin, Texas on October 11, 2015
- Studio albums: 5
- EPs: 3
- Singles: 25
- Music videos: 29
- Mixtapes: 1
- Reissues: 1

American singer Kali Uchis has released five studio albums, three extended plays, one mixtape, one reissue, 25 singles (as well as nine as a featured artist) and twenty-nine music videos.

== Albums ==
=== Studio albums ===
List of studio albums, with selected details
Title	Album details	Peak chart positions										Certifications
Title	Album details	US	US R&B /HH	US Latin	BEL (FL)	BEL (WA)	CAN	NLD	NZ	UK	UK R&B	Certifications
Isolation	Released: April 6, 2018; Label: Rinse, Virgin EMI; Format: CD, LP, digital download, streaming	32	17	—	65	189	70	96	— (Note: Isolation did not enter the NZ Top 40 Albums Chart, but peaked at number two on the NZ Heatseeker Albums Chart.)	62	7	RIAA: Platinum; AMPROFON: Platinum; BPI: Silver; MC: Gold; RMNZ: Platinum
Sin Miedo (del Amor y Otros Demonios) ∞	Released: November 18, 2020; Label: EMI, Interscope; Format: LP, CD, digital download, streaming	52	—	3	—	—	98	79	—	—	—	AMPROFON: 3× Platinum; MC: Gold
Red Moon in Venus	Released: March 3, 2023; Label: Geffen; Format: LP, CD, digital download, streaming	4	2	—	70	99	34	53	—	52	4	RIAA: Gold; MC: Gold; RMNZ: Gold
Orquídeas	Released: January 12, 2024; Label: Geffen; Format: LP, CD, digital download, streaming	2	—	1	25	75	56	34	39	99	5	
Sincerely	Released: May 9, 2025; Label: Capitol; Format: Digital download, streaming	2	—	—	61	49	—	21	29	53	—	
"—" denotes a recording that did not chart or was not released in that territory.

=== Reissues ===
List of reissues, with selected details
Title	Album details
Orquídeas Parte 2	Released: August 9, 2024; Label: Capitol; Format: LP, CD, digital download, streaming

== Mixtapes ==
List of mixtapes, with selected details
Title	Album details
Drunken Babble	Released: August 1, 2012; Label: Self-released; Format: Digital download

== Extended plays ==
List of extended plays, with selected details
Title	EP details	Peak chart positions	
Title	EP details	US Current	US Sales
Por Vida	Released: February 4, 2015; Label: Self-released; Formats: LP, digital download, streaming	—	21
To Feel Alive	Released: April 24, 2020; Label: Virgin EMI, Interscope; Formats: LP, digital download, streaming	94	–
Sin Miedo (Acoustic)	Released: June 4, 2021; Label: EMI, Interscope; Formats: Digital download, streaming	—	–
"—" denotes a recording that did not chart or was not released in that territory.

== Singles ==
=== As lead artist ===
List of singles as lead artist, with selected chart positions and certifications, showing album name and year released
Title	Year	Peak chart positions										Certifications	Album
Title	Year	US	US R&B	US Latin	ARG	AUS	CAN	IRE	NZ	SPA	UK	Certifications	Album
"Know What I Want"	2014	—	—	—	—	—	—	—	—	—	—		Por Vida
"Lottery"	2015	—	—	—	—	—	—	—	—	—	—		Por Vida
"Loner"	2015	—	—	—	—	—	—	—	—	—	—		Por Vida
"Ridin' Round"	2015	—	—	—	—	—	—	—	—	—	—		Por Vida
"Only Girl" (featuring Steve Lacy and Vince Staples)	2016	—	—	—	—	—	—	—	—	—	—		Non-album single
"Tyrant" (Note: The version of "Tyrant" included on Isolation is the one featuring Smith.) (featuring Jorja Smith or Daniel Caesar)	2017	—	—	—	—	—	—	—	—	—	—	RIAA: Gold; MC: Gold	Isolation
"Tirano" (featuring Fuego)	2017	—	—	—	—	—	—	—	—	—	—		Non-album single
"Nuestro Planeta" (featuring Reykon)	2017	—	—	— (Note: "Nuestro Planeta" did not enter the Billboard Hot Latin Songs chart, but peaked at number 14 on the Latin Pop Digital Song Sales chart.)	—	—	—	—	—	—	—		Isolation
"After the Storm" (featuring Tyler, the Creator and Bootsy Collins)	2018	—	16	—	—	—	—	—	— (Note: "After the Storm" did not enter the NZ Top 40 Singles chart, but peaked at number eight on the NZ Heatseekers Singles chart.)	—	—	RIAA: 3× Platinum; BPI: Gold; MC: 2× Platinum; RMNZ: 2× Platinum; SNEP: Gold	Isolation
"Just a Stranger" (featuring Steve Lacy)	2018	—	—	—	—	—	—	—	—	—	—	RIAA: Gold; MC: Gold	Isolation
"Time" (with Free Nationals and Mac Miller)	2019	—	— (Note: "Time" did not enter the Hot R&B Songs chart, but did peak at number 25 on the R&B Digital Song Sales chart.)	—	—	—	—	—	—	—	—	RIAA: Gold; RMNZ: Gold	Free Nationals
"Solita" (Note: "Solita" is only included on the vinyl release of Sin Miedo (del Amor y Otros Demonios).)	2019	—	—	— (Note: "Solita" did not enter the Billboard Hot Latin Songs chart, but peaked at number nine on the Latin Pop Digital Song Sales chart.)	—	—	—	—	—	—	—		Sin Miedo (del Amor y Otros Demonios) ∞
"Aquí Yo Mando" (with Rico Nasty)	2020	—	—	—	—	—	—	—	—	—	—		Sin Miedo (del Amor y Otros Demonios) ∞
"La Luz (Fín)" (with Jhay Cortez)	2020	—	—	— (Note: "La Luz (Fin)" did not enter the Billboard Hot Latin Songs chart, but peaked at number 16 on the Latin Pop Airplay chart.)	—	—	—	—	—	—	—		Sin Miedo (del Amor y Otros Demonios) ∞
"Telepatía"	2021	25	—	1	28	38	45	33	35	51	41	RIAA: 4× Platinum; AMPROFON: 5× Diamond; BPI: Gold; MC: 2× Platinum; PROMUSICAE: Platinum; RMNZ: Platinum; SNEP: Platinum	Sin Miedo (del Amor y Otros Demonios) ∞
"Fue Mejor" (with SZA)	2021	— (Note: "Fue Mejor" did not enter the Billboard Hot 100, but peaked at number 16 on the Bubbling Under Hot 100 Singles chart.)	9	12	—	—	—	—	— (Note: "Fue Mejor" did not enter the NZ Top 40 Singles Chart, but peaked at number seven on the NZ Hot Singles Chart.)	—	—	RIAA: Platinum	Sin Miedo (del Amor y Otros Demonios) ∞
"Another Day in America" (with Ozuna)	2021	—	—	—	—	—	—	—	—	—	—		Non-album singles
"No Hay Ley"	2022	—	—	— (Note: "No Hay Ley" did not enter the Billboard Hot Latin Songs chart, but peaked at number 11 on the Latin Pop Airplay chart.)	—	—	—	—	—	—	—		Non-album singles
"La Única"	2022	—	—	—	—	—	—	—	—	—	—		Non-album singles
"I Wish You Roses"	2023	81	17	—	—	—	—	—	— (Note: "I Wish You Roses" did not enter the NZ Top 40 Singles Chart, but peaked at number 24 on the NZ Hot Singles Chart.)	—	—	RIAA: Platinum; MC: Gold	Red Moon in Venus
"Moonlight"	2023	80	10	—	—	—	64	—	26	—	95	RIAA: 2× Platinum; AMPROFON: 3× Platinum+Gold; BPI: Gold; MC: 2× Platinum; PROMUSICAE: Gold; RMNZ: 2× Platinum; SNEP: Gold	Red Moon in Venus
"Muñekita" (with El Alfa and JT)	2023	—	—	31	—	—	—	—	— (Note: "Muñekita" did not enter the NZ Top 40 Singles Chart, but peaked at number 39 on the NZ Hot Singles Chart.)	—	—	AMPROFON: Platinum	Orquídeas
"Te Mata"	2023	—	—	31	—	—	—	—	— (Note: "Te Mata" did not enter the NZ Top 40 Singles Chart, but peaked at number 40 on the NZ Hot Singles Chart.)	—	—		Orquídeas
"Labios Mordidos" (with Karol G)	2023	97	—	10	—	—	—	—	— (Note: "Labios Mordidos" did not enter the NZ Top 40 Singles Chart, but peaked at number 23 on the NZ Hot Singles Chart.)	59	—	AMPROFON: Platinum	Orquídeas
"Igual que un Ángel" (with Peso Pluma)	2024	22	—	1	—	—	—	—	— (Note: "Igual que un Ángel" did not enter the NZ Top 40 Singles Chart, but peaked at number 21 on the NZ Hot Singles Chart.)	—	—	RIAA: Platinum; AMPROFON: Diamond+2× Platinum+Gold	Orquídeas
"Never Be Yours"	2024	—	7	—	—	—	—	—	— (Note: "Never Be Yours" did not enter the NZ Top 40 Singles Chart, but peaked at number 24 on the NZ Hot Singles Chart.)	—	—		Non-album single
"Sunshine & Rain…"	2025	—	—	—	—	—	—	—	— (Note: "Sunshine & Rain..." did not enter the NZ Top 40 Singles Chart, but peaked at number 30 on the NZ Hot Singles Chart.)	—	—		Sincerely
"ILYSMIH"	2025	—	—	—	—	—	—	—	— (Note: "ILYSMIH" did not enter the NZ Top 40 Singles Chart, but peaked at number 32 on the NZ Hot Singles Chart.)	—	—		Sincerely
"All I Can Say"	2025	— (Note: "All I Can Say" did not enter the Billboard Hot 100, but peaked at number 18 on the Bubbling Under Hot 100 Singles chart.)	10	—	—	—	—	—	— (Note: "All I Can Say" did not enter the NZ Top 40 Singles Chart, but peaked at number 24 on the NZ Hot Singles Chart.)	—	—		Sincerely
"Is It a Crime" (with Mariah the Scientist)	2025	27	5	—	—	—	—	—	— (Note: "Is It a Crime" did not enter the NZ Top 40 Singles Chart, but peaked at number 10 on the NZ Hot Singles Chart.)	—	—	RIAA: Platinum	Hearts Sold Separately
"Cry About It!" (featuring Ravyn Lenae)	2025	—	—	—	—	—	—	—	— (Note: "Cry About It!" did not enter the NZ Top 40 Singles Chart, but peaked at number 24 on the NZ Hot Singles Chart.)	—	—		Sincerely: P.S.
"Muévelo"	2025	—	—	—	—	—	—	—	— (Note: "Muévelo" did not enter the NZ Top 40 Singles Chart, but peaked at number 19 on the NZ Hot Singles Chart.)	—	—	AMPROFON: Gold	Non-album single
"—" denotes items which were not released in that country or failed to chart.

=== As featured artist ===
List of singles as lead artist, with selected chart positions and certifications, showing year released and album name
Title	Year	Peak chart positions											Certifications	Album
Title	Year	US	US R&B /HH	US Latin	FRA	US Dance /Elec.	CAN	COL	MEX	NZ Heat.	SPA	WW	Certifications	Album
"Fucking Young / Perfect" (Tyler, the Creator featuring Charlie Wilson, Chaz Bundick, Syd Bennett, and Kali Uchis)	2015	—	—	—	—	—	—	—	—	—	—	—	RIAA: Gold	Cherry Bomb
"Get You" (Daniel Caesar featuring Kali Uchis)	2016	93	41	—	—	—	—	—	—	—	—	—	RIAA: 7× Platinum; BPI: Platinum; MC: 4× Platinum; RMNZ: 4× Platinum	Freudian
"El Ratico" (Juanes featuring Kali Uchis)	2017	—	—	45	—	—	—	1	31	—	99	—		Mis planes son amarte
"See You Again" (Tyler, the Creator featuring Kali Uchis)	2017	44	12	—	—	—	30	—	—	3	—	35	RIAA: 6× Platinum; AMPROFON: 2× Diamond+Platinum; ARIA: 6× Platinum; BPI: 2× Platinum; MC: Platinum; PROMUSICAE: Platinum; RMNZ: 6× Platinum; SNEP: Diamond	Flower Boy
"10%" (Kaytranada featuring Kali Uchis)	2019	—	—	—	—	—	—	—	—	—	—	—	RIAA: Gold; ARIA: Gold; RMNZ: Gold	Bubba
"Are You Feeling Sad?" (Little Dragon featuring Kali Uchis)	2020	—	—	—	—	25	—	—	—	—	—	—		New Me, Same Us
"Drugs N Hella Melodies" (Don Toliver featuring Kali Uchis)	2021	— (Note: "Drugs N Hella Melodies" did not enter the Billboard Hot 100, but peaked at number 12 on the Bubbling Under Hot 100 Singles chart.)	—	—	—	—	—	—	—	—	—	—	RIAA: Platinum; MC: Gold	Life of a Don
"Sad Girlz Luv Money" (Amaarae and Moliy featuring Kali Uchis)	2021	80	—	—	—	—	48	—	—	—	—	26	RIAA: Platinum; BPI: Silver; RMNZ: Platinum; SNEP: Gold	Non-album single
"4 Me" (Don Toliver featuring Kali Uchis)	2023	—	— (Note: "4 Me" did not enter the US Hot R&B/Hip-Hop Songs chart but peaked at number 24 on the Hot R&B Songs chart.)	—	—	—	—	—	—	—	—	—		Love Sick
"Baby Boy" (Aya Nakamura featuring Kali Uchis)	2025	—	—	—	71	—	—	—	—	—	—	—		Destinée
"—" denotes a title that was not released or did not chart in that territory.

=== Promotional singles ===
Title	Year	Album
"Table for Two"	2014	Drunken Babble
"Te Pongo Mal (Préndelo)" (with Jowell & Randy)	2020	Sin Miedo (del Amor y Otros Demonios) ∞

== Other charted and certified songs ==
Title	Year	Peak chart positions								Certifications	Album
Title	Year	US Bub.	US R&B	US Rock	MEX Ing.	US Latin	NZ Hot	UK Phys.	WW	Certifications	Album
"Melting"	2015	—	—	—	—	—	—	—	—	MC: Gold; RMNZ: Gold	Por Vida
"Rush"	2015	—	—	—	42	—	—	—	—		Por Vida
"She's My Collar" (Gorillaz featuring Kali Uchis)	2017	—	—	36	—	—	—	—	—	BPI: Silver; RMNZ: Gold	Humanz
"Dead to Me"	2018	—	—	—	—	—	—	—	—	RIAA: 2× Platinum; BPI: Silver; MC: Platinum; RMNZ: Platinum	Isolation
"Your Teeth in My Neck"	2018	—	—	—	—	—	—	—	—	RIAA: Gold	Isolation
"Honey Baby (Spoiled!)"	2020	—	—	—	—	—	—	18	—		To Feel Alive
"Fue Mejor" (with PartyNextDoor)	2020	—	—	—	—	46	—	—	—	MC: Gold	Sin Miedo (del Amor y Otros Demonios) ∞
"Fantasy" (featuring Don Toliver)	2023	—	23	—	—	—	28	—	—		Red Moon in Venus
"Me Tengo Que Ir" (with Karol G)	2023	1	19	—	—	—	—	—	—		Mañana Será Bonito (Bichota Season)
"¿Cómo Así?"	2024	19	—	—	—	25	35	—	—		Orquídeas
"Me Pongo Loca"	2024	—	—	—	—	34	—	—	—		Orquídeas
"Pensamientos Intrusivos"	2024	13	—	—	—	23	—	—	—		Orquídeas
"Diosa"	2024	—	—	—	—	30	—	—	—		Orquídeas
"Perdiste"	2024	—	—	—	—	41	—	—	—		Orquídeas
"Young Rich & in Love"	2024	—	—	—	—	38	—	—	—		Orquídeas
"Tu Corazón Es Mío..."	2024	—	—	—	—	44	—	—	—		Orquídeas
"No Hay Ley Parte 2" (with Rauw Alejandro)	2024	15	—	—	—	24	—	—	—		Orquídeas
"Heladito"	2024	—	—	—	—	50	—	—	—		Orquídeas
"Dame Beso / Muévete"	2024	—	—	—	—	33	—	—	—		Orquídeas
"Damn Right" (Jennie featuring Childish Gambino and Kali Uchis)	2025	—	24	—	—	—	—	—	182		Ruby
"Heaven Is a Home..."	2025	—	—	—	—	—	39	—	—		Sincerely
"Angels All Around Me..."	2025	—	24	—	—	—	—	—	—		Sincerely
"Breeze!"	2025	—	25	—	—	—	—	—	—		Sincerely
"Pretty Promises" (featuring Mariah the Scientist)	2025	—	10	—	—	—	29	—	—		Sincerely: P.S.
"—" denotes a recording that did not chart or was not released in that territory.

== Videography ==
Title	Year	Directors
"What They Say"	2013	Kali Uchis and Tony Katai
"Know What I Want"	2014	Kali Uchis and Chris Black
"Rush"	2015	Kali Uchis and WIISSA
"Loner"	2015	Kali Uchis and Andy Hines
"Ridin Round"	2015	Kali Uchis and Felipe Holguín Caro
"Only Girl" (featuring Steve Lacy and Vince Staples)	2016	Kali Uchis, Cory Bailey and Valentine Street
"Tyrant" (featuring Jorja Smith)	2017	Heli
"Nuestro Planeta" (featuring Reykon)	2017	Daniel Sannwald
"After the Storm" (featuring Tyler, the Creator and Bootsy Collins)	2018	Nadia Lee Cohen
"Get Up"	2018	Kali Uchis
"Dead to Me (Acoustic)"	2018	
"Just a Stranger" (featuring Steve Lacy)	2018	BRTHR
"Solita"	2019	Amber Grace Johnson
"I Want War (But I Need Peace)"	2020	
"Aquí Yo Mando" (with Rico Nasty)	2020	Kali Uchis and Philippa Price
"La Luz" (with Jhay Cortez)	2020	Kali Uchis and Lauren Dunn
"La Luna Enamorada"	2020	
"Telepatía"	2021	Kali Uchis
"Fue Mejor" (featuring SZA)	2021	Daniel Sannwald
"No Hay Ley"	2022	Torso
"I Wish You Roses"	2023	Cho Gi-Seok
"Moonlight"	2023	Colin Tilley and Sarah McColgan
"Te Mata"	2023	Bethany Vargas
"Labios Mordidos" (with Karol G)	2023	Shan Phearon (TK)
"Tu Corazón Es Mío... / Diosa"	2024	Child
"Igual que un Ángel" (with Peso Pluma)	2024	Jason Lester
"Never Be Yours"	2024	
"Si No Es Contigo (Remix)" (with Cris MJ and Jhayco)	2024	Chris Cadaver
"Crashing" (with D4vd)	2025	Kenneth Cappello
"Sunshine & Rain..."	2025	Zach Apo-Tsang
"All I Can Say"	2025	Bethany Vargas
"Is It a Crime" (with Mariah the Scientist)	2025	Claire Bishara

== Guest appearances ==
List of non-single guest appearances, with other performing artists, showing year released and album name
Title	Year	Artist(s)	Album
"On Edge"	2014	Snoop Dogg	That's My Work Volume 3
"Divine"	2014	GoldLink	The God Complex
"Find Your Wings"	2015	Tyler, the Creator, Roy Ayers, Syd Bennett	Cherry Bomb
"Perfect"	2015	Tyler, the Creator	Cherry Bomb
"Wave"	2015	Major Lazer	Peace Is the Mission
"She's My Collar"	2017	Gorillaz	Humanz
"Ticker Tape"	2017	Gorillaz, Carly Simon	Humanz
"Worth My While"	2017	Bootsy Collins	World Wide Funk
"Caramelo Duro"	2017	Miguel	War & Leisure
"The Turn"	2020	none	The Turning (Original Motion Picture Soundtrack)
"Hey Boy"	2020	Omar Apollo	Apolonio
"Desafinado"	2022	none	Minions: Rise of Gru (Original Motion Picture Soundtrack)
"Bad Life"	2022	Omar Apollo	Ivory
"Damn Right"	2025	Jennie, Childish Gambino	Ruby
