= The Sincerely, Tour =

2025–2026 concert tour by Kali Uchis

- Tour by Kali Uchis
- Promotional poster for the tour
- Location: North America; South America
- Associated album: Orquídeas; Sincerely
- Start date: August 14, 2025
- End date: February 25, 2026
- Legs: 2
- No. of shows: 37
- Supporting acts: Thee Sacred Souls; 54 Ultra; Urias

Kali Uchis concert chronology
- Red Moon in Venus Tour (2023); The Sincerely, Tour (2025–2026); For The Girls Tour (2026)

The Sincerely, Tour was the fourth headlining concert tour by American singer-songwriter Kali Uchis in support of her fourth and fifth studio albums, Orquídeas (2024) and Sincerely (2025) It began on August 14, 2025, in Portland, Oregon, with shows across North and South America. It concluded in Mexico City on February 25, 2026, comprising 37 shows. Thee Sacred Souls served as the opening act, except for the San Jose show where 54 Ultra was the opening act.

== Announcements ==
On May 13, 2025, Uchis announced that she would embark on the Sincerely, Tour with the twenty-four dates in North America. It will mark her fourth headlining concert tour set. Artist pre-sale and general sale were announced at the same time. The pre-sales ran from May 15, with the general sale happened on May 16, 2025. On June 27, 2025, Uchis added a new San Jose and a third Los Angeles date due to demand. The Latin American leg of the tour was announced on October 20.

== Set list ==
The following set list is obtained from the August 14, 2025, show in Portland. It is not intended to represent all dates throughout the tour.

Act I – Sincerely

1. "Heaven Is a Home…"
2. "Sugar! Honey! Love!"
3. "Lose My Cool,"
4. "It's Just Us"
5. "For: You"
6. "Silk Lingerie,"
7. "All I Can Say"
8. "Daggers!"
9. "Angels All Around Me…"
10. "Sunshine & Rain..."

Act II – Orquídeas

11. "Muñekita"
12. "Labios Mordidos"
13. "¿Cómo Así?"
14. "Me Pongo Loca"
15. "Pensamientos Intrusivos"
16. "Perdiste"
17. "Sad Girlz Luv Money"
18. "Diosa"
19. "Si No Es Contigo"
20. "Dame Beso / Muévete"
21. "Igual que un Ángel"

Act III – Por Vida

22. "Sycamore Tree"
23. "Speed"
24. "Rush"
25. "Loner"
26. "Melting"

Act IV – Isolation

27. "Your Teeth in My Neck"
28. "Dead to Me"
29. "After the Storm"
30. "See You Again"

Act V – Sin Miedo (del Amor y Otros Demonios) & Red Moon in Venus

31. "La Luna Enamorada"
32. "Fue Mejor"
33. "No Eres Tú (Soy Yo)"
34. "Quiero Sentirme Bien"
35. "Telepatía"
36. "I Wish You Roses"
37. "Moonlight"

=== Alterations ===
- During the first show in Inglewood, Peso Pluma joined Uchis onstage to perform his verse of Igual que un Ángel. Uchis also did an encore singing "Territorial" and a then unreleased song titled "Cry About It!".
- During the second show in Inglewood, Steve Lacy joined Uchis onstage to perform "Bad Habit". SZA also joined Uchis on stage to perform the remix of "Fue Mejor".
- A week before the twenty-eighth show in San Jose, SAP Center and Livenation Norcal announced that 54 Ultra was going to be opening act.

== Tour dates ==
Date (2025)	City	Country	Venue	Opening act
August 14	Portland	United States	Moda Center	Thee Sacred Souls
August 15	Seattle	United States	Climate Pledge Arena	Thee Sacred Souls
August 17	Sacramento	United States	Golden 1 Center	Thee Sacred Souls
August 18	San Francisco	United States	Chase Center	Thee Sacred Souls
August 20	Inglewood (Note: Labeled as Los Angeles in promotion material.)	United States	Kia Forum	Thee Sacred Souls
August 21	Inglewood	United States	Kia Forum	Thee Sacred Souls
August 23	Palm Desert	United States	Acrisure Arena	Thee Sacred Souls
August 24	San Diego	United States	Pechanga Arena	Thee Sacred Souls
August 27	Phoenix	United States	PHX Arena	Thee Sacred Souls
August 28	El Paso	United States	Don Haskins Center	Thee Sacred Souls
August 30	Dallas	United States	American Airlines Center	Thee Sacred Souls
August 31	Austin	United States	Moody Center	Thee Sacred Souls
September 2	Houston	United States	Toyota Center	Thee Sacred Souls
September 4	Orlando	United States	Kia Center	Thee Sacred Souls
September 5	Miami	United States	Kaseya Center	Thee Sacred Souls
September 7	Atlanta	United States	State Farm Arena	Thee Sacred Souls
September 8	Raleigh	United States	Lenovo Center	Thee Sacred Souls
September 11	New York City	United States	Madison Square Garden	Thee Sacred Souls
September 12	New York City	United States	Madison Square Garden	Thee Sacred Souls
September 14	Boston	United States	TD Garden	Thee Sacred Souls
September 16	Laval	Canada	Place Bell	Thee Sacred Souls
September 17	Toronto	Canada	Scotiabank Arena	Thee Sacred Souls
September 19	Baltimore	United States	CFG Bank Arena	Thee Sacred Souls
September 20	Philadelphia	United States	Xfinity Mobile Arena	Thee Sacred Souls
September 22	Chicago	United States	United Center	Thee Sacred Souls
September 23	Chicago	United States	United Center	Thee Sacred Souls
September 25	Denver	United States	Ball Arena	Thee Sacred Souls
September 27	San Jose	United States	SAP Center	54 Ultra
September 28	Inglewood	United States	Intuit Dome	Thee Sacred Souls

Date (2026)	City	Country	Venue	Opening act
February 8	São Paulo	Brazil	Vibra São Paulo	Urias
February 12	Santiago	Chile	Movistar Arena	—N/a
February 15	Lima	Peru	Costa 21	—N/a
February 18	Bogota	Colombia	Movistar Arena	—N/a
February 21	Monterrey	Mexico	Auditorio Banamex	—N/a
February 25	Mexico City	Mexico	Palacio de Los Deportes	—N/a

== Cancelled shows ==
Date (2026)	City	Country	Venue	Reason
February 10	Buenos Aires	Argentina	Movistar Arena	Unforeseen circumstances
February 22	Guadalajara	Mexico	Auditorio Telmex	Cartel violence in Jalisco
