= Muévelo =

Muévelo may refer to:

- "Muévelo" (Nicky Jam and Daddy Yankee song), 2020
- "Muévelo" (Sofía Reyes song), featuring Wisin, 2014
- "Muevelo", a 2022 song by Black Eyed Peas from Elevation
- "Muévelo", a 2007 song by Cruz Martínez y Los Super Reyes from El Regreso de los Reyes
- "Muévelo", a 1996 song by Fey from Tierna la Noche
- "Muévelo", a 2025 song by Kali Uchis
