= Never Be Yours =

Single by Kali Uchis
- Released: June 21, 2024
- Genre: R&B
- Length: 3:16
- Label: Capitol
- Songwriters: Kali Uchis; Michael Denine; Ken Gold
- Producer: John Crocker

Kali Uchis singles chronology
"Igual que un Ángel" (2024)	"Never Be Yours" (2024)	"Crashing" (2025)

"Never Be Yours" is a song by American singer Kali Uchis. It was originally released as a track from her debut mixtape, Drunken Babble (2012). Uchis later released a re-recorded version of the song as a single on June 21, 2024, due to strong demand from fans. The song also serves as her first release under Capitol Records.

== Background ==
During Uchis’ high school years, she learned to play the piano and saxophone, leading her to participate in her school's jazz band. She later began to skip class to spend time at her school's photo lab, making experimental short films. Skipping class and breaking the curfew set by her parents led to her being kicked out of her home. During this time, she lived in her car and wrote songs on her keyboard which would later appear on her debut mixtape, Drunken Babble (2012).

A year after releasing her debut mixtape, Uchis uploaded separate tracks of the mixtape on her SoundCloud account, leading to the song and mixtape quickly gaining attention online, attracting notable figures such as Tyler, The Creator and Snoop Dogg. In the following year, Uchis deleted the mixtape from the internet out of dissatisfaction with the project's quality.

== Live performances ==
On May 14, 2014, a video of Kali Uchis performing the song was uploaded on YouTube by the Kinda Neat Podcast. As of June 2024, the video has surpassed 24 million views.
