= Lottery (Kali Uchis song) =

Single by Kali Uchis

from the EP Por Vida
- Released: January 13, 2015
- Recorded: 2014
- Genre: R&B; soul
- Length: 3:26
- Label: Self-released
- Songwriter(s): Kali Uchis; Alex Epton; Michael Denne; Kenneth Gold
- Producer(s): Alex Epton

Kali Uchis singles chronology
"Know What I Want" (2014)	"Lottery" (2015)	"Loner" (2015)

Music video
- "Lottery" on YouTube

"Lottery" is a song by American singer Kali Uchis. It was released as a single from her debut EP, Por Vida.

== Reception ==
Vogue's Alex Frank wrote that "while the production twinkles like a classic Supremes song, Uchis quivers between pretty singing and straightforward rapping for some very frank lyrics about life and love in the modern world". Writing for The Fader, Zara Golden opined "it's another bit of fizzy, pink-tinged and attitude chocked modern Motown".
