= No Hay Ley =

Single by Kali Uchis
- Language: Spanish; English
- Released: September 2, 2022
- Genre: House
- Length: 2:37
- Label: Interscope
- Songwriters: Kali Uchis; Ovy on the Drums; El Guincho; Jam City; Cristian Andrés Salazar; Cristina Chiluiza; Servando Moriche Primera Mussett
- Producers: Kali Uchis; Ovy on the Drums; El Guincho; Jam City; Geeneus

Kali Uchis singles chronology
"Another Day in America" (with Ozuna)" (2021)	"No Hay Ley" (2022)	"La Única" (2022)

Music video
- "No Hay Ley" on YouTube

"No Hay Ley" (stylized in all caps), is a song by American singer Kali Uchis. It was released as a single on September 2, 2022, by Interscope Records.

== Background and composition ==
Uchis first teased the song on August 15, 2022, through a video on social media. On August 17, she shared a second snippet followed by a message asking for 50K likes on the post to release it. In her Vogue interview Uchis stated, "The song feels very nostalgic, very early 2000s vibe, so I wanted something kind of like that—and I wanted to bring in people from the fashion world, too."

The song was officially released on September 2, 2022. A remix of the song "No Hay Ley Parte 2" with Rauw Alejandro, was featured on her fourth studio album Orquídeas.

== Charts ==
Chart performance for "No Hay Ley"
Chart (2022)	Peak position
US Latin Pop Airplay (Billboard)	11

== Release history ==
Release formats for "No Hay Ley"
Region	Date	Format	Label	Ref.
Various	September 2, 2022	Digital download; streaming	Interscope	
