= Aquí Yo Mando =

2020 single by Kali Uchis and Rico Nasty

Single by Kali Uchis and Rico Nasty

from the album Sin Miedo (del Amor y Otros Demonios)
- Language: Spanish; English
- Released: August 7, 2020
- Recorded: 2019
- Genre: Alternative R&B; trap-pop
- Length: 2:22
- Label: Virgin EMI; Interscope
- Songwriters: Kali Uchis; Rico Nasty; Servando Primera; Tainy; Jon Leone; RVNES; Cris Chil; Albert Hype
- Producers: Albert Hype; Jon Leone; RVNES; Tainy

Kali Uchis singles chronology
| "Solita" (2019) | "Aquí Yo Mando" (2020) | "La Luz" (2020) |

Rico Nasty singles chronology
| "Popstar" (2020) | "Aquí Yo Mando" (2020) | "iPhone" (2020) |

Music video
- "Aquí Yo Mando" on YouTube

"Aquí Yo Mando" (Latin American Spanish: [aˈki ˈʝo ˈmando]; transl. "Here I Command") is a song by American recording artists Kali Uchis and Rico Nasty, released on August 7, 2020, as the lead single from Uchis' second studio album, Sin Miedo (del Amor y Otros Demonios). Being her first release since To Feel Alive (2020), the song is about sex and is performed primarily in Spanish.

== Background and release ==
A snippet of the song was first previewed in an episode of the HBO series Insecure in May 2020. Uchis originally announced on the single on August 2, writing that it would feature Argentine rapper and singer Cazzu as well as Rico Nasty. However, she later scrapped the former's appearance and re-announced the single's release on August 6, this time with just Rico Nasty. In August 2020, Kali Uchis and Rico Nasty were interviewed by Genius for the publications "Verified" series, where the duo both explained the meaning behind the song's lyrics.

== Critical reception ==
Tom Breihan of Stereogum described "Aquí Yo Mando" as "a slick, shiny pop song with production from urbano masterminds Tainy, Albert Hype, and Jon Leone" and wrote, "Where Kali Uchis often floats over tracks, she comes off intense on this one. Rico is in her sing-rap mode, switching back and forth between Spanish and English." Elias Leight of Rolling Stone wrote that through the song, Uchis "embraces the brute-force 808s and chattering hi-hats of trap", and noted that her namedrop of Romeo Santos is "an obvious standout". Francesca Hodges of The Daily Californian described the song as "a bold, assertive demonstration of domination" and noted that "empowering sentiments permeate the track, challenging ideas of what it means to exude strong female energy."

== Music video ==
A video for the song was first teased alongside the single's re-announcement on August 6, 2020, indicating its imminent release for the following day. The music video, directed by Phillipa Price, was premiered on August 10, 2020.

Summing up the plot of the video, Sajae Elder of The Fader wrote, "the pair [are] on a weapons-filled rampage, dropping bodies in underground parking lots and filming each other along the way" The duo's hairstyles in the video were designed and created by Iggy Rosales and Preston Wada. Praising the music video, Francesca Hodges of The Daily Californian wrote, "A partnership of shoulder-padded suits and avant-garde-sculpted hair peppers the video, Uchis and Nasty creating a luxe landscape of vanity and power with the words and visuals," and noted that when the two "bring out their stiletto heels and brass knuckles for a music video, you already know the song means business." Alex Peters of Dazed also summarized the events in the music video, writing that "Uchis and Nasty cast as a pair of crime-fighting assassins taking on corrupt FBI agents while sporting the most incredible out-of-this-world hair. Think Bonnie and Clyde if they were cyborgs who grew up in Whoville."
