= La Luz (Fín) =

2020 single by Kali Uchis and Jhay Cortez

Single by Kali Uchis and Jhay Cortez

from the album Sin Miedo (del Amor y Otros Demonios)
- Language: Spanish; English
- Released: October 1, 2020
- Recorded: 2020
- Genre: Latin pop; reggaeton; R&B
- Length: 2:59
- Label: Virgin EMI; Interscope
- Songwriters: Kali Uchis; Jhay Cortez; Tainy
- Producer: Tainy

Kali Uchis singles chronology
"Aquí Yo Mando" (2020)	"La Luz (Fín)" (2020)	"Telepatía" (2021)

Jhay Cortez singles chronology
"Dime a Ve" (2020)	"La Luz (Fín)" (2020)	"Only Fans (Remix)" (2020)

Music video
- "La Luz (Fín)" on YouTube

"La Luz (Fín)" (Latin American Spanish pronunciation: [la ˈlus ˈfin]; transl. "The Light (End)"; stylized in all lowercase) is a song by American singer Kali Uchis and Puerto Rican singer Jhay Cortez. It was released on October 1, 2020, serving as the second single from Uchis' second studio album, Sin Miedo (del Amor y Otros Demonios).

== Background and composition ==
I don't really like to have a lot of collaborations on my projects, so I always knew that I just wanted it to be a few people that made sense for me. So, for Jhay, I knew that I wanted people who were true to Latin music, true to the culture, and also killing it in that space, people that were, for lack of a better word, "seasoned," and I just really wanted to be able to work with someone who was also just already in that world because it's is a new world to me.

— Kali Uchis on collaborating with Jhay Cortez on "La Luz (Fín)"

"La Luz (Fín)" is a "soft to the touch" song blending Latin pop, reggaeton, and R&B over a downtempo, "simple, but intoxicating" dembow beat.

Kali Uchis described the song as having sexual undertones, saying it's about "the moment when you set your sights on someone and can't wait to do everything freaky imaginable with them."

Uchis and Jhay Cortez first met in Miami to record the song, finishing it immediately.

== Critical reception ==
"La Luz (Fín)" received mostly positive reviews from critics. Rob H of Beats Per Minute commented on the song's production and sensuality, calling it "intimidating in the levels of sexuality" and an "all around steamy affair". In a review of the parent album, Oliver Corrigan of Gigwise praised Uchis' vocal delivery, calling it "delicately intimate" and also noted that the song's musicality was reminiscent of her earlier R&B work. Upon release of the song, Carolyn Droke of Uproxx called the song "steamy", later saying in an article that it served as a preview of its parent album's "rhythmic sound". Brany Barragan, a writer of The Daily Californian complimented the collaboration between Uchis and Cortez, saying the latter "perfectly contrasted Uchis' soft vocals" while also praising the former's "shape-shifting talent" and experimentation in the reggaeton genre.

== Music video ==
The music video for "La Luz (Fín)", directed by Uchis and Lauren Dunn, was released on October 27, 2020. The video features aesthetics pulling from the early 2000s.

American singer Omar Apollo, a frequent collaborator of Uchis, appears in the music video.

== Charts ==
Chart performance for "La Luz (Fín)"
Chart (2021)	Peak position
US Latin Pop Airplay (Billboard)	16
