= Cry About It! =

2025 single by Kali Uchis and Ravyn Lenae

Single by Kali Uchis and Ravyn Lenae

from the album Sincerely
- Language: Spanish; English
- Released: September 11, 2025
- Genre: R&B; doo-wop
- Length: 2:51
- Label: Capitol
- Songwriters: Karly Marina Loaiza; Ravyn Lenae; Spencer Stewart
- Producers: Spencer Stewart; Karly Marina Loaiza

Kali Uchis singles chronology
"Is It a Crime" (2025)	"Cry About It!" (2025)	"Muévelo" (2025)

Ravyn Lenae singles chronology
"One Wish" (2024)	"Cry About It!" (2025)

"Cry About It!" is a song by American singers Kali Uchis and Ravyn Lenae. It was released on September 11, 2025, by Capitol Records as a single from Uchis' fifth studio album, Sincerely (2025).

== Background and recording ==
"Cry About It!" was released on September 11, 2025, as part of the promotional rollout for Sincerely: P.S., the deluxe edition of Uchis' album Sincerely.

The song marks a collaboration between Uchis and Ravyn Lenae, blending Uchis' Latin-inflected R&B style with Lenae's vocals.

It serves as a bonus track ahead of the deluxe edition's release, which is scheduled for September 26, 2025.

Musically, "Cry About It!" opens with a light, somewhat festive march feel, evolving into a waltz-like section. Uchis alternates between English and Spanish, and the track has been described as having vintage R&B and doo-wop influences.

Uchis and Lenae performed the song on The Tonight Show Starring Jimmy Fallon.

== Critical reception ==
Robin Murray of Clash praised the song and wrote, "Two supreme R&B queens, each has their own identity – somehow, "Cry About It!" brings them together perfectly, an exhibition of femme energy." Zachary Horvath of HotNewHipHop wrote, "On "Cry About It!" you are getting some doo-wop like production in tandem with melodic R&B. Lenae's whispery voice sounds excellent next to Kali's similarly soft delivery. Overall, we could see them flourishing during the 50s and 60s in all honesty."

== Charts ==
Chart performance for "Cry About It!"
Chart (2025–2026)	Peak position
New Zealand Hot Singles (RMNZ)	24

== Release history ==
Release formats for "Cry About It!"
Region	Date	Format	Label	Ref.
Various	September 12, 2025	Digital download; streaming	Capitol	
