= All I Can Say (Kali Uchis song) =

2025 single by Kali Uchis

Single by Kali Uchis

from the album Sincerely
- Released: May 9, 2025
- Genre: R&B; doo-wop
- Length: 3:07
- Label: Capitol
- Songwriter: Kali Uchis
- Producers: 54 Ultra; Kali Uchis; Vince Chiarito

Kali Uchis singles chronology
"ILYSMIH" (2025)	"All I Can Say" (2025)	"Is It a Crime" (2025)

Music video
- "All I Can Say" on YouTube

"All I Can Say" is a song by American singer-songwriter Kali Uchis. It was released on May 9, 2025, through Capitol Records, as the third single from Uchis' fifth studio album, Sincerely. It was accompanied by a music video released in tandem with the album.

== Background ==
According to the source, the song first gained attention after being teased on a USB drive discovered by a fan, further building anticipation for the release. A high-quality snippet was later shared, which only heightened the excitement for the song. A music video for the song was released alongside the album. In an interview for ABC News, Uchis said she wrote "All I Can Say" in the car on the way to the studio, further stating, "I try to just make beauty out of all of my experiences."

== Composition ==
The song is a R&B and doo-wop track, and was released on May 9.

== Charts ==
Chart performance for "All I Can Say"
Chart (2025)	Peak position
New Zealand Hot Singles (RMNZ)	24
US Bubbling Under Hot 100 (Billboard)	18
US Hot R&B/Hip-Hop Songs (Billboard)	24

== Release history ==
Release formats for "All I Can Say"
Region	Date	Format	Label	Ref.
Various	May 9, 2025	Digital download; streaming	Capitol	
Italy	June 26, 2025	Radio airplay	EMI	
