= Sincerely (Kali Uchis album) =

2025 studio album by Kali Uchis

- Standard cover (including vinyl and CD)

Studio album by Kali Uchis
- Released: May 9, 2025
- Recorded: 2023–2024
- Genres: Neo soul; dream pop; R&B
- Length: 50:52
- Languages: English; Spanish
- Label: Capitol
- Producers: 54 Ultra; Alex Goose; Al Shux; Benny Blanco; Cashmere Cat; Dan Darmawan; Dylan Wiggins; Jeff Hazin; Josh Crocker; Kali Uchis; Leon Michels; Nick Ferraro; Spencer Stewart; the Outfit; Vegyn; Vince Chiarito

Kali Uchis chronology
| Orquídeas Parte 2 (2024) | Sincerely (2025) |

Singles from Sincerely
- 1. "Sunshine & Rain..." Released: March 27, 2025; 2. "ILYSMIH" Released: April 25, 2025; 3. "All I Can Say" Released: May 9, 2025

Deluxe edition cover

Singles from Sincerely: P.S.
- 1. "Cry About It!" Released: September 12, 2025

Sincerely is the fifth studio album by Colombian-American singer Kali Uchis. It was released on May 9, 2025, through Capitol Records. The album was supported by three singles: "Sunshine & Rain...", "ILYSMIH" and "All I Can Say", the latter released in tandem with the album. The deluxe edition of the album, Sincerely: P.S., includes features from Ravyn Lenae and Mariah the Scientist, and was released on October 3, 2025.

Upon its release, Sincerely received widespread acclaim from music critics and debuted at number two on the US Billboard 200 with 62,000 units, making it her third consecutive top-ten album in the country. To support the album, Uchis embarked on The Sincerely, Tour from August 14, 2025, to February 25, 2026.

== Background and theme ==
Following the release of her fourth studio album and second Spanish-language album Orquídeas in January 2024, as well as the deluxe edition Orquídeas Parte 2, Uchis announced that she had her next album ready in an interview with Billboard on June 4, 2024. She further teased an upcoming album later that week at the Billboard Mujeres Latinas en la Música ceremony.

In March 2025, the singer revealed that a "life-altering" event inspired her new album but did not disclose any details about it. She later revealed that the death of her mother and the birth of her first child inspired the album. Uchis stated that the album is dedicated to her mother and she wanted to immortalize her in the album. According to Uchis, Sincerely is about the "complexities of life" and trying to "find joy in life despite the world", "appreciate every moment and not take life for granted". After listening back to the album after its completion, the singer noticed many things in its lyrics "that fully encapsulate" the way she felt at the moment.

On September 11, 2025, Uchis announced the deluxe edition Sincerely: P.S., set for release on September 26, 2025, alongside the single "Cry About It!" featuring Ravyn Lenae. On September 24, 2025, Uchis announced on her Instagram post that Sincerely: P.S. was pushed back till October 3, 2025, and unveiled the tracklist.

== Promotion ==
On March 17, 2025, Uchis announced the album title in a video on social media that shows her writing a letter in a candle-lit room wearing sleep clothes. She simultaneously announced her partnership with American record label Capitol Records and its chairman Tom March. On March 18, Uchis announced the album's first single "Sunshine & Rain…", which was released on March 27, 2025. On March 27, 2025, she announced the release date for the album to be May 9, 2025, alongside the album's cover art the same day. On April 25, 2025, she released the second single "ILYSMIH".

In May 2025, Uchis announced The Sincerely, Tour in support of the album. The tour began on August 14, 2025, in Portland and concluded on February 25, 2026, in Mexico City, with Thee Sacred Souls opening.

== Critical reception ==
Professional ratings
Aggregate scores
| Source | Rating |
|---|---|
| AnyDecentMusic? | 7.7/10 |
| Metacritic | 83/100 |
Review scores
| Source | Rating |
| AllMusic | 4/5 stars |
| Clash | 8/10 |
| NME | 4/5 stars |
| Paste | 8.5/10 |
| Pitchfork | 7.7/10 |
| Rolling Stone | 4/5 stars |
| Slant Magazine | 4/5 stars |

Sincerely received widespread acclaim from critics. At Metacritic, which assigns a normalized rating out of 100 to reviews from mainstream publications, the album received an average score of 83, based on 7 reviews, indicating "universal acclaim". The review aggregator site AnyDecentMusic? compiled 7 reviews and gave the album an average of 7.7 out of 10, based on their assessment of the critical consensus.

Stefanie Fernández of Rolling Stone wrote, "The acceptance Uchis finds on the latter half of the album doesn't come at the expense of the chaos and insecurity she sings about earlier on. It's all there, together: love and hurt, heaven and earth, birth and loss." NME's Nick Levine gave the album four stars rating out of five and wrote, "Here, her music shimmers with confidence even when her lyrics hint at deep-rooted insecurities. The world is a particularly brutal place right now, but this album supplies a timely but timeless-sounding balm." Robin Murray of Clash stated, "This is a record that sets the lights to dim and revels in the shadows. At times little more than whisper, Sincerely strips away the excess to unfurl the pure truth of love. Another crowning achievement, it’s long past time we honoured Kali Uchis as a transformative R&B talent." Pitchfork's Alfred Soto wrote, "Sincerely plays better as a whole rather than as tracks excerpted for a playlist, which is fine, though "Sugar! Honey! Love!" and "Daggers!" rank among Uchis' most lived-in tracks. Besides, albums as guileless and hermetic as Sincerely, recorded by ambitious artists of relative youth, tend to look like a moment's monument to a joy that they have no way of knowing is transient, and if it isn't, well, that's fine too."

=== Year-end lists ===
Select year-end rankings
| Publication | List | Rank | Ref. |
|---|---|---|---|
| Beats Per Minute | BPM's Top 50 Albums of 2025 | 23 | |
| Billboard | The 50 Best Albums of 2025 | 31 | |
| Complex | The 50 Best Albums of 2025 | 25 | |
| Slant Magazine | The 50 Best Albums of 2025 | 32 | |

== Commercial performance ==
Sincerely debuted at number two on the US Billboard 200, earning 62,000 album-equivalent units in its first week — including 38,000 in pure album sales. This marked Uchis' third top-ten album on the Billboard 200.

In Australia, Sincerely debuted at No. 44 on the ARIA Top 50 Albums chart. In the United Kingdom, the album peaked at No. 53 on the Official Albums Chart (with higher placement on some subsidiary UK charts — e.g., No. 10 on the Official Albums Sales Chart and top-12 on the Scottish Albums Chart).

== Track listing ==
Sincerely track listing
| No. | Title | Producer(s) | Length |
|---|---|---|---|
| 1. | "Heaven Is a Home..." | Kali Uchis; Jeff Hazin; Nick Ferraro; Dylan Wiggins^{[a]} | 4:04 |
| 2. | "Sugar! Honey! Love!" | Uchis; the Outfit | 3:04 |
| 3. | "Lose My Cool," | Uchis; Josh Crocker | 5:56 |
| 4. | "It's Just Us" | Dan Darmawan | 3:00 |
| 5. | "For: You" | Uchis; Hazin; Ferraro; Wiggins^{[a]} | 3:13 |
| 6. | "Silk Lingerie," | Uchis; Vegyn; Wiggins^{[a]} | 4:07 |
| 7. | "Territorial" | Uchis; Hazin; Ferraro | 3:14 |
| 8. | "Fall Apart," | Uchis; Crocker; Alex Goose | 3:06 |
| 9. | "All I Can Say" | Uchis; 54 Ultra; Vince Chiarito | 3:07 |
| 10. | "Daggers!" | Uchis; Crocker; Tom Henry^{[a]} | 3:06 |
| 11. | "Angels All Around Me…" | Uchis; Leon Michels; Wiggins^{[a]} | 5:34 |
| 12. | "Breeze!" | Uchis; Al Shux; Wiggins^{[a]} | 2:24 |
| 13. | "Sunshine & Rain…" | Uchis; Wiggins | 3:17 |
| 14. | "ILYSMIH" | Uchis; Crocker; Wiggins | 3:33 |
| Total length: | | | 50:52 |

Sincerely digital special edition track listing
| No. | Title | Length |
|---|---|---|
| 15. | "I Go to Sleep" | 1:55 |
| 16. | "Summer Nights" | 3:56 |
| Total length: | | 56:43 |

Sincerely: P.S. track listing
| No. | Title | Producer(s) | Length |
|---|---|---|---|
| 15. | "Cry About It!" (featuring Ravyn Lenae) | Uchis; Spencer Stewart | 2:51 |
| 16. | "Whispers of the Wind..." | Uchis; 54 Ultra; Chiarito | 2:53 |
| 17. | "Pretty Promises" (featuring Mariah the Scientist) | Benny Blanco; Cashmere Cat | 3:09 |
| 18. | "Cherry on Top" | Uchis; Stewart | 3:06 |
| 19. | "All of the Good" | Uchis; Crocker | 3:43 |
| Total length: | | | 64:34 |

=== Notes ===
- ^{^[a]} signifies an additional producer.

== Personnel ==
Credits adapted from Tidal.

=== Musicians ===
- Kali Uchis – vocals
- Josh Crocker – bass, drums, guitar, organ, synthesizer (track 8)
- Alex Goose – celesta, Mellotron, synthesizer (track 8)
- Aaron Frazer – drums (track 8)
- 54 Ultra – background vocals, guitar, organ, piano, vibraphone (track 9)
- Samuel Martinez – drums, tambourine (track 9)
- Vince Chiarito – bass (track 9)
- Leon Michels – bass, guitar, keyboards (track 11)
- Nick Movshon – bass (track 11)
- Homer Steinweiss – drums (track 11)
- Lee Falco – drums (track 11)
- Marco Benevento – piano (track 11)
- Heavilyn Ohene-Akrasi – choir vocals (track 12)
- Callum Jaye – choir vocals (track 12)
- Catherine Nkuo – choir vocals (track 12)
- Chantel Marie Atayi – choir vocals (track 12)
- Christina Babalola – choir vocals (track 12)
- Emmanuel Dadzie – choir vocals (track 12)
- Lanre Abdul-Gaffar – choir vocals (track 12)
- Lya Mbakadi – choir vocals (track 12)
- Marie Mpenge – choir vocals (track 12)
- Olajide Makanjuola – choir vocals (track 12)
- Oluwafirekayo Adekusibe – choir vocals (track 12)
- PJ Greaves – choir vocals (track 12)
- Rinna Ohene-Akrasi – choir vocals (track 12)
- Sarah Robinson – choir vocals (track 12)
- Tomiwa Okelola – choir vocals (track 12)
- Dylan Wiggins – programming (track 13)
- Pooks – background vocals (track 14)

=== Technical ===
- Laura Sisk – mixing, engineering, vocal production
- Ruairi O'Flaherty – mastering
- Jasmine Chen – engineering (tracks 1, 4, 9–11)
- Alex Goose – engineering (track 8)
- Vince Chiarito – engineering (track 9)
- Jimmy Robertson – engineering (track 12)
- Miguel Maloles – engineering (track 13)

== Charts ==
Chart performance for Sincerely
| Chart (2025) | Peak position |
|---|---|
| Australian Albums (ARIA) | 44 |
| Austrian Albums (Ö3 Austria) | 51 |
| Belgian Albums (Ultratop Flanders) | 61 |
| Belgian Albums (Ultratop Wallonia) | 49 |
| Dutch Albums (Album Top 100) | 21 |
| French Albums (SNEP) | 35 |
| German Albums (Offizielle Top 100) | 22 |
| New Zealand Albums (RMNZ) | 29 |
| Polish Albums (ZPAV) | 25 |
| Portuguese Albums (AFP) | 32 |
| Scottish Albums (Official Charts) | 12 |
| Swiss Albums (Schweizer Hitparade) | 11 |
| UK Albums (Official Charts) | 53 |
| US Billboard 200 | 2 |

== Release history ==
Release formats for Sincerely
| Region | Date | Format | Version | Label | Ref. |
|---|---|---|---|---|---|
| Various | May 9, 2025 | CD; digital download; streaming; vinyl | Standard | Capitol | |
| Various | October 3, 2025 | Digital download; streaming | Deluxe | Capitol | |
