= Solita (Kali Uchis song) =

Single by Kali Uchis

from the album Sin Miedo (del Amor y Otros Demonios)
- Language: English; Spanish
- Released: December 4, 2019
- Recorded: 2018
- Genre: Reggaeton
- Length: 2:58
- Label: Virgin EMI; Interscope
- Songwriters: Anthony Clemons, Jr.; Jahaan Akil Sweet; Kali Uchis; Marco Masis; Rupert Thomas Jr.
- Producers: Tainy; Sevn Thomas; Sweet; Austen Jux-Chandler

Kali Uchis singles chronology
"Time" (2019)	"Solita" (2019)	"Aquí Yo Mando" (2020)

Music video
- "Solita" on YouTube

"Solita" (Spanish: [soˈlita]) is a song by Colombian-American singer Kali Uchis. It was released on December 4, 2019, through Virgin EMI Records and Interscope Records. Originally meant to serve as the lead single for Uchis’ second studio album, Sin Miedo (del Amor y Otros Demonios), the track would be excluded from the standard version of the album. The song would later be included on the vinyl release and its 2021 deluxe edition.

== Composition ==
I’d rather dance alone than with the devil. This song is about healing, freedom and embracing the mixed emotions that come with that. I hope my fans feel sexy when they listen to it.

— Uchis on "Solita"

"Solita" was written by Kali Uchis, Anthony Clemons, Jr., Marco Masis, Rupert Thomas Jr., and Jahaan Akil Sweet, with production being handled by the latter three alongside Austen Jux-Chandler. It runs for 2 minutes and 58 seconds. Described by Uchis as "sad, yet horny," the song was written in 2018 and is inspired by a breakup she experienced. According to her, the song comments on the positive points of being alone, rather than the "toxic stuff" commonly associated with a single person. The Fader's Jordan Darville described the track as a "Latin trap-influenced slow burn," and Pitchfork's Colin Lodewick noted a reggaeton beat. Brazilian news portal R7.com labeled the track as a "modern R&B with Latin touches." Mxdwmm's Ashwin Charey compared the song's production to that of 1980s synth-pop, while noting its influences from hip hop and format which follows a crescendo and diminuendo pattern.

Writing for Clash, Robin Murray characterized "Solita" as an "ode to independence, to rejecting societal pressure to embrace a relationship" and an "ultra-addictive pop riot", whilst Peter Helman from Stereogum deemed that it "returns to [Uchis'] old theme of isolation." Uchis' vocals on "Solita" are described by MTV News' Trey Alston as "stronger than it initially lets on, deepening into a swift and booming wind." The song features Uchis singing in both English and Spanish.

== Music video ==
An accompanying music video for "Solita" premiered on December 18, 2019, and was directed by Amber Grace Johnson and filmed in Los Angeles. Johnson hired frequent collaborator Object & Animal to produce the music video, which presents Uchis in different characters and personalities, with Nia Groce from Hypebeast describing her looks as "outer-space themed [...] transforming into the likes of an exotic dancer and a goddess." Clash's Murray wrote that the video is "a colourful, vivid return from a vital force."

=== Synopsis ===
The video starts with Kali in a cocoon of glass in the middle of the desert. She then performs with white pythons in the sand while short clips of Uchis featuring a futuristic mask in between scenes. Afterwards, she wears a red bodysuit while men appear to be worshiping around her. Later, she becomes surrounded by oiled-up men holding Zippo lighters while she smokes. The video ends with the same men who were surrounding her close their lighters individually and leaving Uchis in darkness.

== Personnel ==
Credits adapted from Tidal.

- Vocals: Kali Uchis
- Songwriting: Anthony Clemons, Jr., Jahaan Akil Sweet, Kali Uchis, Tainy, Rupert Thomas, Jr.
- Production: Austen Jux-Chandler, Jahaan Sweet, Sevn Thomas, Tainy
- Engineering: Austen Jux-Chandler, Lauren D'Elia, Octavia Landix
- Mastering: Colin Leonard
- Vocal production: Austen Jux-Chandler, Lauren D'Elia
- Mixing: Josh Gudwin
- Mixing assistance: Elijah Mirritt-Hitch

== Charts ==
Chart (2019)	Peak position
US Latin Pop Digital Song Sales (Billboard)	9
