= To Feel Alive =

EP by Kali Uchis
- Released: April 24, 2020
- Recorded: 2020
- Genre: Pop; R&B
- Length: 10:03
- Label: Virgin EMI; Interscope
- Producer: Rogét Chahayed; Bunx Dadda; Aja Grant; Austen Jux-Chandler; Sounwave; Kali Uchis; Vegyn

Kali Uchis chronology
Isolation (2018)	To Feel Alive (2020)	Sin Miedo (del Amor y Otros Demonios) (2020)

To Feel Alive is the second extended play by American singer Kali Uchis, released on April 24, 2020, through Virgin EMI Records and Interscope Records. It is her first extended play since Por Vida (2015) and first release overall since Isolation (2018). Unable to issue her second studio album, the singer recorded the EP's songs in her home while self-isolating due to the COVID-19 pandemic.

== Background and composition ==
Before the release of To Feel Alive, Uchis uploaded a video to her YouTube channel featuring snippets of demos for "Honey Baby" and "Angel", with the latter previously titled "Pablo Escobar"; ultimately, none of the songs were used for Por Vida. The two were reworked, with "Angel" changing only one line. Uchis first performed "I Want War (But I Need Peace)" during her 2019 co-headlining tour with Jorja Smith.

Ellen Johnson, writing for Paste classified To Feel Alive as a "stellar rendering of escapist pop", while Antwane Folk from Rated R&B described it as "dreamy R&B". Charlie Zhang of Hypebeast wrote that the EP features "dreamy, electric synth-infused sounds that complement Uchis' uniquely wistful singing". In an interview for Insider, Uchis revealed that it took "probably 15 minutes" to write and record the EP's title track.

== Artwork and promotion ==
The EP's artwork is a painting Uchis commissioned to Polish artist Oh de Val. It consists of a brunette Uchis performing oral sex on a blonde version of herself, representing the combining of styles found on Isolation and Por Vida, respectively, to form a new, more pleasurable one. The image's explicit content was censored on Spotify and Apple Music.

A lyric video for "I Want War (But I Need Peace)" premiered on April 26, 2020. The video's scenery was filmed in Uchis' backyard through a green screen.

== Critical reception ==
Professional ratings
Review scores
Source	Rating
NME	4/5 stars
The Young Folks	7/10

To Feel Alive received generally positive reviews from music critics. NME's Thomas Smith gave To Feel Alive a 4 out of 5 stars rating, praising Uchis' vocal performance and her decision to rerecord the demo tracks. Ramlogun Khushi of The Young Folks stated that with the EP "Uchis manages to tell a captivating love story in just a few tracks, chock full of groovy beats and colorful imagery".

== Track listing ==
To Feel Alive track listing
No.	Title	Writer(s)	Producer(s)	Length
1.	"Honey Baby (Spoiled!)"	Karly-Marina Loaiza; Aja Grant; Joe Thornalley	Vegyn; Grant	2:04
2.	"Angel"	Loaiza; Jason Kirt Simeon Fleming	Kali Uchis; Bunx Dadda	2:23
3.	"I Want War (But I Need Peace)"	Loaiza; Mark Anthony Spears; Rogét Chahayed	Sounwave; Chahayed	2:39
4.	"To Feel Alive"	Loaiza	Uchis	2:57
Total length:				10:03

Notes

- The first three track titles are stylized in all lowercase.
- "To Feel Alive" and any text within brackets are stylized in all caps.

== Personnel ==
Credits adapted from Tidal.

- Rogét Chahayed – production, songwriting (3)
- Bunx Dadda – production (2)
- Jason Kirt Simeon Fleming – songwriting (2)
- Aja Grant – production, songwriting (1)
- Austen Jux-Chandler – additional production (1), mixing (1, 2, 4), engineering (3), mastering (4)
- Henry Lunetta – engineering (3)
- Prash "Engine-Earz" Mistry – mastering (1–4), mixing (3)
- Sounwave – production, songwriting (3)
- Joe Thornalley – songwriting (1)
- Kali Uchis – lead vocals (all tracks), songwriting (all tracks), production (2, 4), engineering (2, 4)
- Vegyn – production (1)

== Charts ==
Chart performance for To Feel Alive
Chart (2021)	Peak position
US Top Current Album Sales (Billboard)	94

== Release history ==
Region	Date	Format	Label	Ref.
Various	April 24, 2020	Digital download; streaming	Virgin EMI; Interscope	
Various	October 24, 2020	LP	Virgin EMI; Interscope	
