= ILYSMIH =

2025 single by Kali Uchis

Single by Kali Uchis

from the album Sincerely
- Released: April 25, 2025
- Length: 3:33
- Label: Capitol
- Songwriters: Karly Loaiza; Pooks
- Producers: Josh Crocker; Dylan Wiggins; Karly Loaiza

Kali Uchis singles chronology
"Sunshine & Rain…" (2025)	"ILYSMIH" (2025)	"All I Can Say" (2025)

Visualizer
- "ILYSMIH" on YouTube

"ILYSMIH" (an abbreviation for "I Love You So Much It Hurts") is a song by American singer-songwriter Kali Uchis. It was released on April 25, 2025, through Capitol Records, as the second single from Uchis' fifth studio album, Sincerely.

== Background and composition ==
The song was first teased on a USB drive, found by a fan who collected the second letter from the Sincerely mailboxes on April 13, 2025. On April 19, 2025, Uchis announced via TikTok that the song will serve as the second single from Sincerely, and is set to be released on April 25, 2025. "ILYSMIH" was inspired by Uchis' "profound experience of motherhood and immeasurable love for her child".

== Critical reception ==
Bryson "Boom" Paul of HotNewHipHop wrote that the song is "meant to reach the soul, not the charts", while stating: "Uchis is no longer just curating aesthetics. She's chronicling her evolution. "ILYSMIH" proves that intimacy can be as compelling as innovation—and that vulnerability, when rooted in love, can move mountains."

== Charts ==
Chart performance for "ILYSMIH"
Chart (2025)	Peak position
New Zealand Hot Singles (RMNZ)	32

== Release history ==
Release formats for "ILYSMIH"
Region	Date	Format	Label	Ref.
Various	April 25, 2025	Digital download; streaming	Capitol	
