= I Wish You Roses =

Single by Kali Uchis

from the album Red Moon in Venus
- Language: English
- Released: January 19, 2023
- Genre: R&B
- Length: 3:45
- Label: Geffen
- Songwriters: Karly Loaiza; Dylan Wiggins; Josh Crocker
- Producers: Dylan Wiggins; Josh Crocker

Kali Uchis singles chronology
"La Única" (2022)	"I Wish You Roses" (2023)	"Moonlight" (2023)

Music video
- "I Wish You Roses" on YouTube

"I Wish You Roses" is a song by American singer Kali Uchis, and was produced by Dylan Wiggins and Josh Crocker. The song was released on January 19, 2023, through Geffen Records, with a music video released alongside. The song is the lead single off her third studio album, Red Moon in Venus (2023).

== Background and composition ==
On January 16, 2023, Kali Uchis announced a teaser video on social media featuring "a Jello-like cake with a white rose in the middle of it". According to Uchis, the song is about "being able to release people with love".

== Music video ==
The official music video was released on the same day as the song released, and was directed by Cho Gi-Seok. In the music video, Uchis recreated some iconic scenes from the late 1999 film American Beauty. Also, the Colombian-American singer can be seen covered in rose petals, as she sings.

== Charts ==
Chart performance for "I Wish You Roses"
Chart (2023)	Peak position
New Zealand Hot Singles (RMNZ)	24
US Billboard Hot 100	81
US Hot R&B/Hip-Hop Songs (Billboard)	28

== Certifications ==
Certifications for "I Wish You Roses"
Region	Certification	Certified units/sales
Brazil (Pro-Música Brasil)	Gold	20,000^{‡}
Canada (Music Canada)	Gold	40,000^{‡}
United States (RIAA)	Platinum	1,000,000^{‡}
^{‡} Sales+streaming figures based on certification alone.

== Release history ==
Release formats for "I Wish You Roses"
Region	Date	Format	Label	Ref.
Various	January 19, 2023	Digital download; streaming	Geffen	
