= Red Moon in Venus =

Studio album by Kali Uchis
- Released: March 3, 2023
- Recorded: 2020–2021
- Genres: R&B; neo soul; psychedelic soul
- Length: 43:14
- Languages: English; Spanish
- Label: Geffen
- Producers: Aaron Paris; Al Shux; Albert Hype; Benny Blanco; Cashmere Cat; Chris LaRocca; Clairmont the Second; Darkchild; DJ Khalil; Dylan Wiggins; Grades; Jahaan Sweet; J.LBS; Josh Crocker; Kali Uchis; Manuel Lara; Mndsgn; Omar Apollo; P2J; Sounwave; Toneworld; Vicky Nguyen; WahWah James; WondaGurl; Yussef Dayes

Kali Uchis chronology
Sin Miedo (del Amor y Otros Demonios) (2020)	Red Moon in Venus (2023)	Orquídeas (2024)

Alternative cover
- Alternative cover used on vinyl releases.

Singles from Red Moon in Venus
- 1. "I Wish You Roses" Released: January 19, 2023; 2. "Moonlight" Released: February 23, 2023

Red Moon in Venus is the third studio album by American singer Kali Uchis. The album was released on March 3, 2023, through Geffen Records. The album features guest appearances by Omar Apollo, Don Toliver and Summer Walker. It is predominantly an R&B record.

Red Moon in Venus debuted at number four on the Billboard 200 and two on Billboard's Top R&B/Hip-Hop Albums with over 55,000 album-equivalent units, making it her first top-10 album on that list.

== Background ==
On January 11, 2022, Uchis announced that she was putting the finishing touches on her third studio album. On April 21, 2022, she revealed to Billboard that she had two albums ready, one in English and one in Spanish. On September 2, 2022, Uchis released the "retro house" track "No Hay Ley", the first solo release in nearly two years. On December 9, 2022, she announced that she had turned in the new album, describing it as her "latest contribution to this world". She released the single "I Wish You Roses" on January 19, 2023, along with its music video. The song was produced by Dylan Wiggins and Josh Crocker. According to Uchis, the song is about "being able to release people with love". On February 23, 2023, she released the second single for the album, "Moonlight", accompanied by a lyric video.

The singer announced the album title three days later. Uchis revealed through her Instagram stories that many of the songs on the album were written and recorded years ago, specifying that the album was recorded during lockdown. The release date and the cover were both revealed on January 23. About the project, Uchis explained:

Red Moon in Venus is a timeless, burning expression of desire, heartbreak, faith, and honesty, reflecting the divine femininity of the moon and Venus.

— Uchis on the subject of the album, Consequence

She felt inspired by astrology, wanting to reflect the blood moon as the trigger to "send your emotions into a spin".

== Critical reception ==
Professional ratings
Aggregate scores
Source	Rating
AnyDecentMusic?	7.7/10
Metacritic	84/100
Review scores
Source	Rating
AllMusic	4/5 stars
Clash	8/10
The Daily Telegraph	4/5 stars
Exclaim!	8/10
The Guardian	4/5 stars
The Line of Best Fit	7/10
MusicOMH	3/5 stars
NME	4/5 stars
Pitchfork	8.2/10
Rolling Stone	4/5 stars

Red Moon in Venus received widespread acclaim from critics. At Metacritic, which assigns a normalized rating out of 100 to reviews from mainstream publications, the album received an average score of 84, based on 13 reviews, indicating "universal acclaim". Aggregator AnyDecentMusic? gave it 7.7 out of 10, based on their assessment of the critical consensus.

The album received an 8.2 out of 10 on Pitchfork and was acclaimed as "best new music" the week of its release. Michael Cragg of The Guardian awarded the album with 4 out of 5 stars, stating: "Over a vintage soul confection, Uchis travels through heartache, finishing somewhere near desolation: “What’s the point of all the pretty things in the world, if I don’t have you?” Things end, however, with resolution on the sun-dappled, 60s soul of Happy Now, in which Uchis urges herself to “remember all the good things”. Astrological guff never sounded so lush."

The album was placed in numerous year-end lists of 2023.

Year-end lists
Publication	List	Rank	Ref.
Time	The 10 Best Albums of 2023	1	
Pitchfork	The 50 Best Albums of 2023	43	
The Hollywood Reporter	The 10 Best Albums of 2023	2	
The Guardian	The 50 Best Albums of 2023	23	
Complex	The 50 Best Albums Of 2023	35	
Rolling Stone	The 100 Best Albums of 2023	29	
Slant Magazine	The 50 Best Albums of 2023	46	
The Los Angeles Times	The 20 Best Albums of 2023	2	
Variety	The Best Albums of 2023	6	

== Track listing ==
Red Moon in Venus track listing
No.	Title	Lyrics	Music	Producers	Length
1.	"In My Garden..."	Karly-Marina Loaiza	Loaiza	Kali Uchis	0:25
2.	"I Wish You Roses"	Loaiza	Loaiza; Josh Crocker; Dylan Wiggins	Crocker; Wiggins	3:39
3.	"Worth the Wait" (featuring Omar Apollo)	Loaiza; Omar Velasco	Loaiza; Apollo; Vicky Nguyen; Jason Pounds	J.LBS; Nguyen; Apollo	2:30
4.	"Love Between..."	Loaiza	Loaiza; Leon Moore; Crocker	Crocker	2:35
5.	"All Mine"	Loaiza	Loaiza; Daniel Traynor; Alexander Shuckburgh	Grades; Al Shux	3:29
6.	"Fantasy" (featuring Don Toliver)	Loaiza; Caleb Zackery Toliver	Loaiza; Jahaan Sweet	Sweet; P2J	2:58
7.	"Como Te Quiero Yo"	Loaiza; Cristina Chiluiza; Brandon Cores	Loaiza; Alberto Melendez; Manuel Lara	Lara; Albert Hype	2:14
8.	"Hasta Cuando"	Loaiza; Chiluiza; Cores	Loaiza; Melendez; Lara	Lara; Albert Hype	2:09
9.	"Endlessly"	Loaiza	Loaiza; Rodney Jerkins; Marvin Hemmings	Darkchild; Toneworld	2:35
10.	"Moral Conscience"	Loaiza	Loaiza; Wiggins	Wiggins	3:32
11.	"Not Too Late (Interlude)"	Loaiza	Loaiza; Clairmont II Humphrey	Clairmont the Second	2:35
12.	"Blue"	Loaiza	Loaiza; Crocker	Crocker; Yussef Dayes	3:12
13.	"Deserve Me" (with Summer Walker)	Loaiza; Nija Charles; Taylor Parks; Summer Walker	James Colwell; Chris LaRocca; Ebony Oshunrinde; Aaron Cheung	WondaGurl; Aaron Paris; LaRocca; WahWah James	4:25
14.	"Moonlight"	Loaiza	Loaiza; Magnus August Hoiberg; Benjamin Levin	Cashmere Cat; Benny Blanco; Leon Michels^{[a]}	3:07
15.	"Happy Now"	Loaiza	Loaiza; Mark Anthony Spears; Khalil Abdul-Rahman; Ringgo Acheta; Dan Seeff; Sam Barsh	Sounwave; DJ Khalil; Mndsgn	3:49
Total length:					43:14

Note

- "Como Te Quiero Yo" is titled as "Amanecer" in the vinyl edition of the album.
- ^{^[a]} signifies an additional producer

== Personnel ==
Musicians

- Kali Uchis – vocals
- Phil Cornish – piano (track 1)
- Josh Crocker – bass guitar, drums, keyboards, programming (2, 4, 12); guitar (2, 4)
- Vicky Nguyen – keyboards (3)
- Rocco Palladino – bass guitar (12)
- Yussef Dayes – drums, synthesizer programming (12)
- Alexander Bourt – percussion (12)
- Elijah Fox – piano (12)
- Malik Venner – saxophone (12)
- Miles James – synthesizer (12)
- Nick Movshon – bass guitar (14)
- Homer Steinweiss – drums (14)
- Paul Castelluzo – guitar (14)
- Benny Blanco – keyboards, programming (14)
- Magnus Høiberg – keyboards, programming (14)
- Leon Michels – keyboards (14)

Technical

- Prash Mistry – mastering (all tracks), mixing (5–10, 13–15)
- David Kim – mixing (1–4, 11, 12)
- Benny Blanco – mixing (14)
- Cashmere Cat – mixing (14)
- Austen Jux-Chandler – engineering
- Hector Castro – engineering (3, 4, 7, 8, 12)
- Miguel Correa – engineering (7, 8)
- Jens Jungkurth – engineering (14)
- Leon Michels – engineering (14)
- Morning Estrada – recording (2–4, 6–8, 10, 13)
- David Bishop – recording (13)
- Lavar Bullard – mixing assistance (6–10, 13–15)
- Luca Brown – engineering assistance (5)

== Charts ==
=== Weekly charts ===
Weekly chart performance for Red Moon in Venus
Chart (2023)	Peak position
Belgian Albums (Ultratop Flanders)	70
Belgian Albums (Ultratop Wallonia)	99
Canadian Albums (Billboard)	34
Dutch Albums (Album Top 100)	53
French Albums (SNEP)	90
Lithuanian Albums (AGATA)	53
Scottish Albums (Official Charts)	47
Spanish Albums (Promusicae)	35
Swiss Albums (Schweizer Hitparade)	29
UK Albums (Official Charts)	52
UK R&B Albums (Official Charts)	4
US Billboard 200	4
US Top R&B/Hip-Hop Albums (Billboard)	2

=== Year-end charts ===
Year-end chart performance for Red Moon in Venus
Chart (2023)	Position
US Billboard 200	149
US Top R&B/Hip-Hop Albums (Billboard)	59

== Certifications ==
Certifications for Red Moon in Venus
Region	Certification	Certified units/sales
Canada (Music Canada)	Gold	40,000^{‡}
New Zealand (RMNZ)	Gold	7,500^{‡}
United States (RIAA)	Gold	500,000^{‡}
^{‡} Sales+streaming figures based on certification alone.

== Release history ==
Release formats for Red Moon in Venus
Region	Date	Format	Label	Ref.
Various	March 3, 2023	CD; digital download; streaming; vinyl	Geffen	
