= Muñekita =

2023 single by Kali Uchis, El Alfa and JT

Single by Kali Uchis, El Alfa and JT

from the album Orquídeas
- Language: Spanish; English
- English title: "Little Doll"
- Released: August 4, 2023
- Genre: Dembow; reggaeton; pop rap
- Length: 3:40
- Label: Geffen
- Songwriters: Karly Loaiza; Jatavia Shakara Johnson; Mazzarri; Francisco Reynaldo Briceño Villa; Emanuel Herrera Batista; Lorna Zarina Aponte Acosta; Rodney Sebastian Clark Donalds; Chael Eugenio Betances Alejo
- Producers: FABV; Mazzarri

Kali Uchis singles chronology
"Moonlight" (2023)	"Muñekita" (2023)	"Te Mata" (2023)

El Alfa singles chronology
"La Gringa" (2023)	"Muñekita" (2023)

JT singles chronology
"No Bars" (2023)	"Muñekita" (2023)	"Like Dat" (remix) (2023)

Visualizer
- "Muñekita" on YouTube

"Muñekita" (Spanish: [muɲeˈkita], transl. "Little Doll") is a song performed by American singer Kali Uchis, Dominican rapper El Alfa and American rapper JT from City Girls. It was released on August 4, 2023, through Geffen Records as the lead single from Uchis' fourth studio album, Orquídeas (2024).

== Background ==
In July 2023, Uchis announced the song as the lead single for her upcoming album, writing: "con mucho orgullo estoy empezando esta nueva era con ustedes y dos artistas k admiro mucho" (transl. "With great pride I am starting this new era with you and two artists I admire a lot").

== Composition ==
"Muñekita" is a song that combines dancehall-influenced reggaeton, dembow and pop rap. The song is written in the key of D Major, with a moderately fast tempo of 112 beats per minute.

== Charts ==
Chart performance for "Muñekita"
Chart (2023)	Peak position
New Zealand Hot Singles (RMNZ)	39
US Hot Latin Songs (Billboard)	31

== Release history ==
Release formats for "Muñekita"
Region	Date	Format	Label	Ref.
Various	August 4, 2023	Digital download; streaming	Geffen	
