= Sin Miedo (del Amor y Otros Demonios) =

- Standard digital cover (Note: Standard vinyl stars a nude Uchis with pink wings and the words "Kali Uchis Presents Sin Miedo Deluxe".)

Studio album by Kali Uchis
- Released: November 18, 2020
- Recorded: 2018–2019
- Genre: R&B; reggaeton; pop; bedroom pop
- Length: 34:41
- Language: Spanish; English
- Label: EMI; Interscope
- Producer: Albert Hype; Erik Bodin; Jahaan Sweet; Jon Leone; Josh Crocker; Kali Uchis; Kurtis McKenzie; Manuel Lara; Ray Nelson; Ricky Reed; Rogét Chahayed; RVNES; Sounwave; Supa Dups; Tainy

Kali Uchis chronology
To Feel Alive (2020)	Sin Miedo (del Amor y Otros Demonios) (2020)	Red Moon in Venus (2023)

Singles from Sin Miedo (del Amor y Otros Demonios)
- 1. "Aquí Yo Mando" Released: August 7, 2020; 2. "La Luz" Released: October 1, 2020; 3. "Telepatía" Released: February 26, 2021

Deluxe edition cover

Singles from Sin Miedo (del Amor y Otros Demonios) [Deluxe Edition]
- 1. "Solita" Released: December 4, 2019; 2. "Fue Mejor" Released: September 29, 2021

Sin Miedo (del Amor y Otros Demonios) ∞ (Note: Spanish: [sim ˈmjeðo ðel aˈmoɾ i ˈotɾos ðeˈmonjos], transl. Fearless (of Love and Other Demons).) is the second studio album and first Spanish album by American singer Kali Uchis, released on November 18, 2020, through EMI Records and Interscope Records. The album, which is Uchis' first record predominantly sung in Spanish, was supported by three singles, "Aquí Yo Mando" with Rico Nasty, "La Luz" with Jhay Cortez, and "Telepatía". The album was also preceded by the promotional single "Te Pongo Mal (Préndelo)" with Jowell & Randy. The album features guest appearances from PartyNextDoor, Rico Nasty, Cortez, and Jowell & Randy. The album peaked at number 52 on the Billboard 200.

The album was nominated for Grammy Award for Best Música Urbana Album at the 64th Annual Grammy Awards, as well as Favorite Latin Album at the American Music Awards of 2021.

An acoustic EP of Sin Miedo was released on June 4, 2021.

== Background ==
In December 2019, Uchis released the intended lead single from the album, "Solita", which would later be demoted to a stand-alone single. In April 2020, the EP, To Feel Alive, was released as Uchis was not able to issue her second studio album. The EP was recorded entirely in isolation amidst the COVID-19 pandemic. Uchis announced the album through her social media, alongside its cover art, title, and guest appearances on November 5, 2020.

Uchis compared the creation of Sin Miedo to that of her previous album. "I traveled the world to make both [...] I started production in Miami, then I came to Los Angeles, and then I refined most of the finishes in London." She also had to convince her label about the album, since her contract only allowed her to release music in English.

The title of the album is a reference to the 1994 novel Of Love and Other Demons by the Colombian author Gabriel García Márquez.

== Singles ==
"Aquí Yo Mando" with Rico Nasty was released on August 7, 2020, with a music video following on August 10. "La Luz" with Jhay Cortez was released on October 1, 2020. A music video was released on October 27. Following viral success on the social media platform TikTok, "Telepatía" was released as the third single from the album. The song impacted Italian and American contemporary hit radio on February 26, 2021, and April 6, 2021, respectively. A music video was released on March 18, 2021, directed by Uchis herself and taking place in Colombia. In promotion for the song, Uchis performed "Telepatía" on The Tonight Show Starring Jimmy Fallon on April 8, 2021. The song later peaked at number one on the US Hot Latin Songs Chart and number 25 on the Billboard Hot 100. On September 29, 2021, a remix of "Fue Mejor" featuring SZA instead of PartyNextDoor was released as a single, alongside its music video.

=== Promotional singles ===
"Te Pongo Mal (Préndelo)" with Jowell & Randy was released on November 17, 2020, as the album's sole promotional single.

== Critical reception ==
Professional ratings
Aggregate scores
Source	Rating
AnyDecentMusic?	6.7/10
Metacritic	78/100
Review scores
Source	Rating
AllMusic	4/5 stars
Evening Standard	3/5 stars
Gigwise	6/10 stars
Loud and Quiet	7/10
NME	4/5 stars
The Observer	3/5 stars
Pitchfork	7.8/10

Sin Miedo (del Amor y Otros Demonios) received generally positive reviews. At Metacritic, which assigns a normalized rating out of 100 to reviews from mainstream publications, the album received an average score of 78, based on four reviews, indicating "generally favorable reviews".

Reviewing the album for AllMusic, Thom Jurek declared that, "Uchis is fearless in stretching her sound past funky breaks, slippery R&B, and spaced-out jazz tropes to offer bracing evolutionary conceptions of reggaeton, cumbia, and boleros, seamlessly juxtaposing them with her own brand of Latin pop, jazz, and soul." Rhian Daly of NME wrote that Uchis "oozes effortless confidence as she follows her songs down an eclectic map of trails. Language barrier or not, it’s a divine second album". Jenzia Burgos of Pitchfork wrote that the album "instead of only containing the funky breaks and trippy jazz stylings that Anglo-market listeners have come to recognize her music for, Uchis sharpens the spotlight on her bilingual, binational Latinx repertoire".

Oliver Corrigan of Gigwise said that "Whilst many patches of Uchis' romantic garden fail to blossom, moments of musical experimentation prove greater than the sum of their parts. Uchis' affirmation against predictability certainly rings true here, even against the lauded impressions on her debut LP of 2018." Rachel Aroesti of The Observer was a bit more reserved in her praise, adding that the album "doesn't feel much like Uchis's artistic step-up, her Norman Fucking Rockwell or El Mal Querer, but more like a suck-it-and-see step on – a hastily released album that suggests her best is yet to come." David Smyth was also ambivilent with regards to the album, declaring "It sends a beautiful atmosphere out into a room, her voice breathy and unshowy, the bass an appealing throb, ticking Latin beats causing heads to nod without moving the feet excessively," and concluded that, "Overall this is a pleasant place to be. That breakout moment will come another time."

The album placed on Los Angeles Times and Variety's lists of the best albums of 2020, at number nine and number seven respectively.

== Track listing ==
Standard edition
No.	Title	Lyrics	Music	Producer(s)	Length
1.	"La Luna Enamorada" (transl. "The Moon in Love")	Luis Chanivecky	Kali Uchis	Josh Crocker	1:50
2.	"Fue Mejor" (transl. "It Was Better") (with PartyNextDoor)	Uchis; Jahron Anthony Brathwaite; Andrea Mangiamarchi	Jahaan Sweet; Ray Nelson	Sweet; Nelson; Crocker	3:48
3.	"Aguardiente y Limón" (transl. "Brandy and Lime")	Uchis	Mark Anthony Spears; Ricky Reed; Rogét Chahayed	Sounwave; Reed; Chahayed	2:41
4.	"Vaya con Dios" (transl. "Go with God")	Uchis	Crocker	Crocker	2:55
5.	"Que Te Pedí" (transl. "What I Asked You")	Fernando Lopez Mulens; Gabriel Luna de la Fuente	Uchis	Crocker	1:44
6.	"Quiero Sentirme Bien" (transl. "I Want to Feel Good")	Uchis	Erik Bodin; Kurtis McKenzie; Yukimi Nagano	McKenzie; Bodin	3:42
7.	"Telepatía" (transl. "Telepathy")	Uchis; Cristina Chiluiza; Servando Primera	Manuel Lara; Albert Melendez; Marco Masis	Tainy; Lara; Albert Hype	2:40
8.	"De Nadie" (transl. "Of No One")	Uchis; Chiluiza	Dwayne Chin-Quee; Joan Ortiz Espada; Lara; Masis	Tainy; Lara; Supa Dups; Austen Jux-Chandler^{[a]}	2:59
9.	"No Eres Tú (Soy Yo)" (transl. "It's Not You (It's Me)")	Uchis; Chiluiza	Luis Figueroa Roig; Leone; Lara; Masis	Lara; Leone; Tainy	2:01
10.	"Aquí Yo Mando" (transl. "Here I Command") (with Rico Nasty)	Uchis; Chiluiza; Maria-Cecilia Kelly	Primera; Masis; Leone; RVNES; Melendez	Albert Hype; Leone; RVNES; Tainy	2:21
11.	"Te Pongo Mal (Préndelo)" (transl. "I Make You Ill (Turn It On)") (with Jowell & Randy)	Uchis; Chiluiza; Joel Muñox; Randy Ortiz Acevedo	Lara; Masis; Miguel Ángel Durán, Jr.	Tainy; Lara	2:52
12.	"La Luz (Fín)" (transl. "The Light (End)") (with Jhay Cortez))	Uchis; Jhay Cortez	Masis	Tainy	2:59
13.	"Ángel sin Cielo" (transl. "Heavenless Angel")	Uchis	Uchis	Uchis	2:03
Total length:					34:36

Vinyl edition bonus track
No.	Title	Lyrics	Music	Producer(s)	Length
14.	"Solita" (transl. "Alone")	Uchis; Anthony Clemons, Jr.	Jahaan Akil Sweet; Masis; Rupert Thomas Jr.	Tainy; Sevn Thomas; Sweet; Austen Jux-Chandler	2:58
Total length:					37:34

Deluxe edition bonus track
No.	Title	Lyrics	Music	Producer(s)	Length
15.	"Fue Mejor" (with SZA)	Kali Uchis; Solána Rowe; Andrea Mangiamarchi	Jahaan Sweet; Ray Nelson	Sweet; Nelson; Crocker	3:51
Total length:					41:25

Sin Miedo (acoustic)
No.	Title	Writer(s)	Producer(s)	Length
1.	"Telepatía" (acoustic)	Uchis; Chiluiza; Primera; Lara; Melendez; Masis	Uchis	2:58
2.	"Fue Mejor" (acoustic)	Uchis; Sweet; Brathwaite; Mangiamarchi; Nelson	Uchis	3:09
3.	"Vaya con Dios" (acoustic)	Uchis; Crocker	Uchis	2:41
Total length:				8:48

Notes

- ^{^[a]} indicates an additional producer.
- All tracks are stylized in all lowercase.
- "Aguardiente y Limón" is stylized as "//aguardiente y limón %ᵕ‿‿ᵕ%".
- "Que Te Pedí" is stylized as "que te pedí//".
- "Aquí Yo Mando" was track four on the initial track listing of the album but it ended up being the 10th track in the final version.
- "La Luna Enamorada" is a cover of "La Luna En Tu Mirada" by Luis Chanivecky.

== Personnel ==
=== Musicians ===
- Kali Uchis – vocals
- PartyNextDoor – vocals (track 2)
- Josh Crocker – piano (track 2), flute (track 2), harp (track 2), bass (tracks 5–6), drums (track 5), guitar (track 5), keyboards (track 5), percussion (tracks 5–6), strings (track 5), vibraphone (track 6)
- Rico Nasty – vocals (track 4)
- Flikka – additional vocals (track 6)
- Joe Harris – guitar (track 6)
- Tom Henry – keyboards (track 6)
- Hailey Niswanger – saxophone (track 6)
- Ariel Shrum – trombone (track 6), trumpet (track 6)
- Jowell & Randy – vocals (track 11)
- Jhay Cortez – vocals (track 12)
- Mauricio Guerrero – guitar (track 13)

=== Technical ===
- Prash "Engine-Earz" Mistry – mixer (tracks 1–2, 4–6, 8–13), mastering engineer (tracks 4, 12)
- Austen Jux-Chandler – recording engineer (tracks 1–3, 5–9, 11, 12), vocal producer (tracks 2–13), engineer (tracks 10, 13)
- Liz Robson – recording engineer (tracks 2, 3, 7)
- Ethan Shumaker – recording engineer (track 3)
- Yakob – recording engineer (track 6)
- Chris Gehringer – mastering engineer (tracks 1–3, 5–11, 13)
- Will Quinnell – mastering engineer (track 11), assistant mastering engineer (tracks 2–3, 5–10, 13)

=== Artwork ===
- Jora Frantzis – photography
- Iggy Rosales – hair styling
- Aleali – hair styling
- Priscilla Ono – make-up artist

== Charts ==
=== Weekly charts ===
Weekly chart performance for Sin Miedo (del Amor y Otros Demonios)
Chart (2020–2021)	Peak position
Canadian Albums (Billboard)	98
Dutch Albums (Album Top 100)	79
Lithuanian Albums (AGATA)	82
Spanish Albums (Promusicae)	75
US Billboard 200	52
US Latin Pop Albums (Billboard)	1
US Latin Rhythm Albums (Billboard)	3
US Top Latin Albums (Billboard)	3

=== Year-end charts ===
Year-end chart performance for Sin Miedo (del Amor y Otros Demonios)
Chart (2021)	Position
US Top Latin Albums (Billboard)	5

Year-end chart performance for Sin Miedo (del Amor y Otros Demonios)
Chart (2022)	Position
US Top Latin Albums (Billboard)	17

Year-end chart performance for Sin Miedo (del Amor y Otros Demonios)
Chart (2023)	Position
US Top Latin Albums (Billboard)	27

Year-end chart performance for Sin Miedo (del Amor y Otros Demonios)
Chart (2024)	Position
US Top Latin Albums (Billboard)	50

== Certifications ==
Certifications for Sin Miedo (del Amor y Otros Demonios)
Region	Certification	Certified units/sales
Canada (Music Canada)	Gold	40,000^{‡}
Mexico (AMPROFON)	3× Platinum	420,000^{‡}
^{‡} Sales+streaming figures based on certification alone.

== Release history ==
Release dates and formats for Sin Miedo (del Amor y Otros Demonios)
Region	Date	Format	Version	Label	References
Various	November 18, 2020	digital download; streaming	Standard	EMI; Interscope	
United States	May 14, 2021	LP	Standard	EMI; Interscope	
Various	June 4, 2021	Digital download; streaming	Acoustic EP	EMI; Interscope	
Various	September 30, 2021	Digital download; streaming	Deluxe	EMI; Interscope	
United States	November 26, 2021	LP	Deluxe	EMI; Interscope	
United States	December 3, 2021	CD	Deluxe	EMI; Interscope	
