= Telepatía =

Single by Kali Uchis

from the album Sin Miedo (del Amor y Otros Demonios)
- Language: Spanish; English
- Released: February 26, 2021
- Recorded: 2020
- Genre: R&B; Latin pop
- Length: 2:40
- Label: Interscope; EMI
- Songwriters: Karly-Marina Loaiza; Cristina Chiluiza; Servando Primera; Manuel Lara; Albert Melendez; Marco Masís
- Producers: Tainy; Lara; Albert Hype

Kali Uchis singles chronology
"La Luz (Fín)" (2020)	"Telepatía" (2021)	"Drugs N Hella Melodies" (2021)

Music video
- "Telepatía" on YouTube

"Telepatía" (Note: Spanish: [telepaˈtia], transl. "Telepathy") (stylized in all lowercase) is a song by American singer Kali Uchis. Originally released on November 18, 2020 as part of her second studio album Sin Miedo (del Amor y Otros Demonios), it became the album's third single on February 26, 2021, after gaining prominence on the social media platform TikTok. Uchis drew inspiration from telepathy and being able to spiritually communicate with someone whom she could not be with.

Unlike her debut studio album, Isolation (2018), Sin Miedo (del Amor y Otros Demonios) initially failed to enter any national charts. However, the viral success of "Telepatía" helped launch the album onto the Billboard 200 for the first time. The song went on to win Favorite Latin Song at the 2021 American Music Awards.

The song was sent to contemporary hit radio in the United States on April 6, 2021.

== Composition ==
"Telepatía" is an R&B and Latin pop song with a laid-back, steady rhythm, and a dreamy, relaxing feeling due to its simple production and “twinkling” instrumentation. Lyrically, the song is about a long-distance relationship that sees Uchis singing (in both Spanish and English) about making love to her partner telepathically while they are apart.

== Critical reception ==
"Telepatía" ranked as the fifth best song of 2021 by Billboard, stating that "not only essential for its addictive groove and inspired lyrical content, the pop gem also put a spotlight on truly bilingual songs having chart potential." The song won Top Latin Song at the 2022 Billboard Music Awards.

== Music video ==
On March 18, 2021, the music video for "Telepatía" was released. It was directed by Uchis herself and filmed in her hometown of Pereira, Colombia. The singer said she wanted "Nothing overproduced, just the beautiful natural magic of the country I have had the honor of also calling home my entire life, Colombia." Uchis announced through her social media that the video had to be uploaded three times due to an error with the audio synchronization.

The video features Uchis walking through the streets of Pereira in a dreamy state, wearing several different outfits. At points she is seen riding a bicycle. She eventually ends up walking past a young man working on his car, though it’s not implied they are together in the video; he stares at her longingly, eventually running uphill to find her swinging on a playground. The two never touch or physically connect, which harkens back to the lyrical theme of a long-distance, telepathic connection.

== Live performances ==
Uchis performed "Telepatía" on The Tonight Show Starring Jimmy Fallon on April 8, 2021. She also sang the song at the 2021 MTV Millennial Awards.

== Track listing ==
Telepatía (acoustic) – Single

- "Telepatía" (acoustic) – 2:58

== Charts ==
=== Weekly charts ===
Weekly chart performance for "Telepatía"
Chart (2021)	Peak position
Argentina Hot 100 (Billboard)	28
Australia (ARIA)	38
Austria (Ö3 Austria Top 40)	74
Belgium (Ultratip Bubbling Under Flanders)	4
Bolivia (Monitor Latino)	7
Canada Hot 100 (Billboard)	45
Chile (Monitor Latino)	16
Colombia (National-Report)	27
Costa Rica (Monitor Latino)	13
Czech Republic Singles Digital (ČNS IFPI)	57
El Salvador (Monitor Latino)	8
France (SNEP)	117
Global 200 (Billboard)	10
Ireland (IRMA)	33
Italy (FIMI)	100
Lithuania (AGATA)	3
Malaysia (RIM)	13
Mexico Streaming (AMPROFON)	1
Mexico (Billboard Mexican Airplay)	19
Netherlands (Single Top 100)	73
New Zealand (Recorded Music NZ)	35
Panama (Monitor Latino)	17
Peru (Monitor Latino)	12
Portugal (AFP)	10
Puerto Rico (Monitor Latino)	17
Romania (Airplay 100)	46
San Marino (SMRRTV Top 50)	14
Singapore (RIAS)	11
Slovakia (Singles Digitál Top 100)	24
Spain (Promusicae)	51
Sweden Heatseeker (Sverigetopplistan)	3
Switzerland (Schweizer Hitparade)	36
UK Singles (Official Charts)	41
UK Hip Hop/R&B (Official Charts)	26
US Billboard Hot 100	25
US Hot Latin Songs (Billboard)	1
US Latin Airplay (Billboard)	1
US Pop Airplay (Billboard)	11
US Rhythmic Airplay (Billboard)	1
US Rolling Stone Top 100	8

=== Year-end charts ===
Year-end chart performance for "Telepatía"
Chart (2021)	Position
Global 200 (Billboard)	81
Portugal (AFP)	83
US Billboard Hot 100	49
US Hot Latin Songs (Billboard)	2
US Mainstream Top 40 (Billboard)	44
US Rhythmic (Billboard)	11

== Certifications ==
Certifications for "Telepatía"
Region	Certification	Certified units/sales
Brazil (Pro-Música Brasil)	Diamond	160,000^{‡}
Canada (Music Canada)	2× Platinum	160,000^{‡}
Denmark (IFPI Danmark)	Gold	45,000^{‡}
France (SNEP)	Platinum	200,000^{‡}
Italy (FIMI)	Gold	35,000^{‡}
Mexico (AMPROFON)	5× Diamond	3,500,000^{‡}
New Zealand (RMNZ)	Platinum	30,000^{‡}
Poland (ZPAV)	Gold	25,000^{‡}
Portugal (AFP)	Platinum	10,000^{‡}
Spain (Promusicae)	Platinum	60,000^{‡}
United Kingdom (BPI)	Gold	400,000^{‡}
United States (RIAA)	4× Platinum	4,000,000^{‡}
^{‡} Sales+streaming figures based on certification alone.

== Release history ==
Release formats for "Telepatía"
Region	Date	Format	Version	Label	Ref.
Italy	February 26, 2021	Contemporary hit radio	Original	Universal	
United States	April 6, 2021	Contemporary hit radio	Original	Interscope; EMI	
United States	April 6, 2021	Rhythmic contemporary radio	Original	Interscope; EMI	
Various	May 28, 2021	Digital download; streaming	Acoustic	Interscope; EMI; Universal	

== See also ==
- List of Billboard number-one Latin songs of 2021
