= Moonlight (Kali Uchis song) =

Single by Kali Uchis

from the album Red Moon in Venus
- Released: February 23, 2023
- Genre: Neo soul
- Length: 3:07
- Label: Geffen
- Songwriters: Karly Loaiza; Magnus August Høiberg; Benjamin Levin
- Producers: Cashmere Cat; Benny Blanco; Leon Michels

Kali Uchis singles chronology
"I Wish You Roses" (2023)	"Moonlight" (2023)	"Muñekita" (2023)

Music video
- "Moonlight" on YouTube

"Moonlight" is a song by American singer Kali Uchis. It was released on February 23, 2023 as the second and final single from her third studio album, Red Moon in Venus.

== Background ==
On November 20, 2022, Uchis first teased "Moonlight" through her TikTok account.

== Music video ==
The official music video was officially released on April 20, 2023, a date associated with cannabis-oriented celebrations, which could be a parallelism to the song's lyrics. It was directed by Colin Tilley and Sarah McColgan.

== Accolades ==
Award and nominations for "Moonlight"
Year	Ceremony	Award	Result	Ref.
2023	WME Awards	Latin American Song	Nominated	

== Virality ==
In August 2023, the song received viral media attention after being featured in various edited clips depicting an anime boy turning into a girl from the music video for "Colors" by Hiroyuki Sawano and Motohiro Hata.

== Charts ==
=== Weekly charts ===
Chart performance for "Moonlight"
Chart (2023)	Peak position
Australia Hip Hop/R&B (ARIA)	29
Canada Hot 100 (Billboard)	64
Global 200 (Billboard)	74
Lithuania (AGATA)	22
New Zealand (Recorded Music NZ)	26
Portugal (AFP)	162
UK Singles (Official Charts)	95
US Billboard Hot 100	80
US Hot R&B/Hip-Hop Songs (Billboard)	25
US Rhythmic Airplay (Billboard)	31

=== Year-end charts ===
Year-end chart performance for "Moonlight"
Chart (2023)	Position
Global 200 (Billboard)	131
US Hot R&B/Hip-Hop Songs (Billboard)	53

== Certifications ==
Certification for "Moonlight"
Region	Certification	Certified units/sales
Brazil (Pro-Música Brasil)	2× Diamond	320,000^{‡}
Brazil (Pro-Música Brasil) Sped Up Viral	Platinum	40,000^{‡}
Canada (Music Canada)	2× Platinum	160,000^{‡}
France (SNEP)	Gold	100,000^{‡}
Mexico (AMPROFON)	3× Platinum+Gold	490,000^{‡}
New Zealand (RMNZ)	2× Platinum	60,000^{‡}
Poland (ZPAV)	Platinum	50,000^{‡}
Portugal (AFP)	Gold	5,000^{‡}
Spain (Promusicae)	Gold	30,000^{‡}
United Kingdom (BPI)	Gold	400,000^{‡}
United States (RIAA)	2× Platinum	2,000,000^{‡}
Streaming
Central America (CFC)	Platinum	7,000,000^{†}
^{‡} Sales+streaming figures based on certification alone.^{†} Streaming-only figures based on certification alone.

== Release history ==
Release formats for "Moonlight"
Region	Date	Format	Label	Ref.
Various	February 23, 2023	Digital download; streaming	Geffen	
United States	April 25, 2023	Rhythmic contemporary radio	Geffen	
