= Sunshine & Rain... =

2025 single by Kali Uchis

"Sunshine & Rain…"

Single by Kali Uchis

from the album Sincerely
- Released: March 27, 2025
- Genre: R&B
- Length: 3:18
- Label: Capitol
- Songwriter: Karly Loaiza
- Producers: Dylan Wiggins; Karly Loaiza

Kali Uchis singles chronology
"Crashing" (2025)	"Sunshine & Rain…" (2025)	"ILYSMIH" (2025)

Music video
- "Sunshine & Rain..." on YouTube

"Sunshine & Rain…" is a song by American singer-songwriter Kali Uchis. It was released on March 27, 2025, through Capitol Records, as the lead single from Uchis' fifth studio album, Sincerely.

== Background and composition ==
On March 18, 2025, Kali Uchis shared a snippet of the song on TikTok, alongside the release date. The music video for "Sunshine & Rain…" was directed by Zach Apo-Tsang, and released on March 29, 2025. The voice of Uchis' mother is sampled in the song.

== Critical reception ==
Zachary Horvath of HotNewHipHop praised the song, describing it as "the vein with its boom-bap-inspired drum pattern and shimmering keyboard chords", stating: "Kali's message is a simple, but accurate one: love is how the world (and people) can heal. Her vocals are entrancing, angelic, and they simply just move your soul. Sincerely, is off to a great start and hopefully, the rest of the album will be just as good." Writing for Uproxx, Flisadam Pointer said that the song "demonstrates that she’s found a way to channel those debilitating emotions into an evolved set of songs rather than banishing herself into void of bitterness." Kourtney Gierke of ACRN wrote: "While "Sunshine & Rain…" is equally tranquil, romantic and catchy, it can’t help but not move her sound forward. For being one of the most consistent and hardworking artists of the decade, her sound has stayed stagnant. On the other hand, despite not having an audible evolution, her lyrics are just getting more and more personal and true to herself."

Pitchfork listed the song as the 80th best of 2025.

== Charts ==
Chart performance for "Sunshine & Rain..."
Chart (2025)	Peak position
New Zealand Hot Singles (RMNZ)	30

== Release history ==
Release formats for "Sunshine & Rain…"
Region	Date	Format	Label	Ref.
Various	March 27, 2025	Digital download; streaming	Capitol	
