= Por Vida =

- Original cover

EP by Kali Uchis
- Released: February 4, 2015
- Recorded: 2014
- Length: 31:03
- Label: Self-released
- Producer: BadBadNotGood; Bunx; Diplo; Alex Epton; Kaytranada; Caleb Stone; Tyler, the Creator

Kali Uchis chronology
| Drunken Babble (2012) | Por Vida (2015) | Isolation (2018) |

Singles from Por Vida
- 1. "Know What I Want" Released: November 11, 2014; 2. "Lottery" Released: January 13, 2015; 3. "Loner" Released: February 4, 2015; 4. "Ridin' Round" Released: November 2, 2015

Alternative cover
- Standard cover (Note: Another version of the album cover, which excludes the song "Know What I Want", shows Uchis looking back against a black-and-white background, wearing a bridal hat.)

Por Vida (Spanish: [poɾ ˈβiða], transl. For Life) is the debut EP by Colombian-American singer Kali Uchis. The project was released as a free download on February 4, 2015, via Kali Uchis' website and later released to digital streaming platforms. It features production by Tyler, the Creator, Kaytranada, Caleb Stone, BadBadNotGood, and XXXChange. The EP has been described as a "dreamy, autobiographical" offering. It was supported by four singles; "Know What I Want", "Lottery", "Loner" and "Ridin' Round".

== Track listing ==
Por Vida track listing
| No. | Title | Writer(s) | Producer(s) | Length |
|---|---|---|---|---|
| 1. | "Sycamore Tree" | Kali Uchis | | 1:52 |
| 2. | "Call Me" | Uchis; Tyler Okonma | Tyler, the Creator | 3:13 |
| 3. | "Melting" | Uchis; Alex Epton; Dexter Tortoriello; Thomas Pentz | XXXChange; Diplo | 3:29 |
| 4. | "Lottery" | Uchis; Epton; Michael Denne; Kenneth Gold | Epton | 3:27 |
| 5. | "Know What I Want" | Uchis; Jason Fleming | Bunx | 4:11 |
| 6. | "Rush" | Uchis; Alexander Sowinski; Chester Hansen; Matthew Tavares; Kevin Celestin | Kaytranada; BadBadNotGood | 3:51 |
| 7. | "Ridin' Round" | Uchis; Alexander Ben-Abdallah; Fleming | Bunx | 3:19 |
| 8. | "Speed" | Uchis; Okonma | Tyler, the Creator | 4:15 |
| 9. | "Loner" | Uchis; Caleb Stone | Caleb Stone | 3:32 |
| Total length: | | | | 31:03 |

Notes

- The songs "Honey Baby" and "Pablo Escobar" (later renamed "angel") were originally made to be included in this EP but for unrevealed reasons they were left out of the final version.
- A music video for the song "Know What I Want" was shot and uploaded to Uchis' official Youtube Channel. For unclear reasons the video was archived and it can no longer be viewed from her channel.
- The artwork has been changed several times throughout the years.
