= Orquídeas =

2024 studio album by Kali Uchis

- Standard cover

Studio album by Kali Uchis
- Released: January 12, 2024
- Recorded: 2021–2022
- Genres: R&B; reggaeton; pop; synth-pop
- Length: 44:14
- Languages: Spanish; English
- Label: Geffen
- Producers: Albert Hype; Julián Bernal; Josh Crocker; Cromo X; El Guincho; FABV; Geeneus; Jam City; Carter Lang; Manuel Lara; Hector Mazzarri; Ovy on the Drums; P2J; Pasqué; Sammy Soso; Sir Nolan; Sounwave; Tainy; Kali Uchis; Westen Weiss; Dylan Wiggins; Yakob

Kali Uchis chronology
Red Moon in Venus (2023)	Orquídeas (2024)	Orquídeas Parte 2 (2024)

Singles from Orquídeas
- 1. "Muñekita" Released: August 4, 2023; 2. "Te Mata" Released: October 20, 2023; 3. "Labios Mordidos" Released: November 23, 2023; 4. "Igual que un Ángel" Released: February 1, 2024

Orquídeas (Spanish: [oɾˈkiðeas], transl. Orchids) is the fourth studio album and second Spanish-language album by Colombian-American singer Kali Uchis. It was released on January 12, 2024, through Geffen Records. The album features guest appearances by Peso Pluma, El Alfa, JT, Karol G, and Rauw Alejandro. Upon its release, Orquídeas became Uchis' highest-charting album on the US Billboard 200, debuting at number two with 69,000 units.

== Background ==
On April 21, 2022, Uchis revealed to Billboard that she had two albums ready, one in English and one in Spanish.

In July 2023, Uchis announced a "new era" for her music, along with a new single titled "Muñekita", with Dominican rapper El Alfa and American rapper JT from City Girls, as the first single for her upcoming album. The single was released on August 4, 2023. On October 11, 2023, Uchis announced her fourth studio album, titled Orquídeas, would be released on January 12, 2024, alongside the album's cover art. On October 16, 2023, she announced the album's second single "Te Mata", which was released on October 20, 2023, alongside a music video. The album's third single "Labios Mordidos", with Colombian singer Karol G, was released on November 24, 2023, alongside a music video. On February 1, 2024, "Igual que un Ángel", with Mexican singer Peso Pluma, was sent to Italian radio as the album's fourth single. Its music video was released on January 17, 2024.

== Critical reception ==
Professional ratings
Aggregate scores
Source	Rating
AnyDecentMusic?	7.8/10
Metacritic	88/100
Review scores
Source	Rating
AllMusic	4.5/5 stars
Clash	8/10
Evening Standard	4/5 stars
The Guardian	4/5 stars
NME	4/5 stars
The Observer	4/5 stars
Paste	8.9/10
Pitchfork	8.4/10
PopMatters	9/10
Rolling Stone	4/5 stars

Orquídeas received widespread acclaim from critics upon its release. At Metacritic, which assigns a normalized rating out of 100 to reviews from mainstream publications, the album received an average score of 88, based on 14 reviews, indicating "universal acclaim". It is currently her highest rated album on the site. Aggregator AnyDecentMusic? compiled 16 reviews and gave the album an average of 7.8 out of 10, based on their assessment of the critical consensus.

Reviewing the album for AllMusic, Thom Jurek concluded that "Uchis remains true to herself by restlessly expanding her music's stylistic reach, embracing the past as instructor to the present. It is as aesthetically appealing as it is musically adventurous. PopMatters' review described the album as having "killer style, playful energy, impeccable production, incredible performances, and some very important representation." Lucy Fitzgerald's review for The Skinny wrote that Orquídeas was "an entire album of sweet spots." Writing for Paste, Elizabeth Braaten wrote that the album was thematically "refreshingly rose-tinted." On the album's production, Isabelia Herrera of Pitchfork wrote that much of the album was "luxuriating in background harmonies and synth arpeggios that feel like they’re enveloped in charmeuse fabrics." Writing for The Line of Best Fit, Emma Thimgren wrote that the album was "emotionally intelligent and dazzlingly timeless." Verónica Bastardo of The Quietus wrote that the album "perfectly delivered" a mix of "niche Latin American genres" with "dreamy chillhop." Jasper Willems of Beats Per Minute wrote that Uchis hits a "sweet spot between a luxurious facade and a candid authenticity" on the album. Julyssa Lopez of Rolling Stone described the album as "loaded with sexual agency and bad-bitch energy." Writing for The Guardian, Alexis Petridis described the album as "dreamy and fuzzy but sharp, witty and danceable." Clash's review by Jay Fullarton wrote that "stylistic switch ups and layered production make Kali’s Latin pop experiments feel almost as creative as Rosalía’s Motomami." Writing for The Arts Desk, Thomas Green wrote that the album's songs were "syrupy, dreamy, smooth, emanating slink rather than bounce." David Smyth of Evening Standard wrote that the album had a lot more energy than Uchis' previous album, Red Moon in Venus. Lucas Villa's review for NME praised the album's "anthems for the LGBTQ+ community." Kitty Empire of The Observer wrote that the album "showcases the singer’s musical versatility and assured bicultural chops."

== Accolades ==
Awards and nominations for Orquídeas
Organization	Year	Category	Result	Ref.
Latin American Music Awards	2024	Favorite Pop Album	Won	
Billboard Latin Music Awards	2024	Latin Pop Album of the Year	Won	
Latin Grammy Awards	2024	Best Pop Vocal Album	Nominated	
Grammy Awards	2025	Best Latin Pop Album	Nominated	

=== Year-end lists ===
Select year-end rankings for Orquídeas
Publication/critic	Accolade	Rank	Ref.
Billboard	Best Albums of 2024	11	
Complex	The 50 Best Albums of 2024	49	
The Guardian	The 50 best albums of 2024	22	
Time Out	The Best Albums of 2024	12	
Uncut	80 Best Albums of 2024	77	
Pitchfork	The 50 Best Albums of 2024	36	
Paste	The 100 Best Albums of 2024	65	
Rolling Stone	The 100 Best Albums of 2024	96	
Rolling Stone en Español	Great Spanish-language Albums of 2024	8	
Slant	The 50 Best Albums of 2024	17	
KCRW	The 30 Best Albums of 2024	27	
Variety	The Best Albums of 2024	2	

== Orquídeas Parte 2 ==
Orquídeas Parte 2

Studio album (reissue) by Kali Uchis
- Released: August 9, 2024
- Recorded: 2021–2022
- Length: 57:55
- Languages: Spanish; English
- Label: Capitol

Kali Uchis chronology
Orquídeas (2024)	Orquídeas Parte 2 (2024)	Sincerely (2025)

Orquídeas Parte 2 is a reissue of Orquídeas, released on August 9, 2024, by Capitol Records, nearly 7 months after the original album. Uchis expressed interest in potentially creating a deluxe version of the album using leftover demos in an interview with KRRL in April 2024. In August 2024, Uchis revealed she would be re-releasing the album with 3 songs that didn't make the original album as well as a remix for the song "Young, Rich & In Love" with Kaytranada.

== Track listing ==
Orquídeas track listing
No.	Title	Lyrics	Music	Producer(s)	Length
1.	"¿Cómo Así?"	Karly-Marina Loaiza	Mark Spears; Matthew "M-Tech" Bernard; Carter Lang	Lang; Sounwave	2:49
2.	"Me Pongo Loca"	Loaiza	Loaiza; Bernard; Spears; Richard Isong; Samuel Awuku	Sounwave; P2J; Sammy Soso; Austen Jux-Chandler^{[a]}^{[v]}	2:57
3.	"Igual que un Ángel" (with Peso Pluma)	Loaiza; Manuel Lorente	Lang; Dylan Wiggins	Lang; Wiggins; Jux-Chandler^{[a]}; Jean Rodríguez^{[v]}	4:20
4.	"Pensamientos Intrusivos"	Loaiza	Lang; Nolan Lambroza; Westen Weiss	Lang; Sir Nolan; Weiss; Jux-Chandler^{[a]}	3:12
5.	"Diosa"	Loaiza; Ayanna	M-Tech; Victor Ekpo; Spears; Isong; Awuku	Sounwave; P2J; Sammy Soso; Jux-Chandler^{[a]}	2:36
6.	"Te Mata"	Loaiza	Loaiza; Manuel Lara; Josh Crocker; Julián Bernal	Kali Uchis; Lara; Crocker; Bernal	3:52
7.	"Perdiste"	Loaiza	Loaiza; Spears; Isong	Sounwave; P2J	2:24
8.	"Young Rich & in Love"	Loaiza	Loaiza; Jakob Rabitsch; Irvin Mejia	Yakob; Pasqué	3:18
9.	"Tu Corazón Es Mío..."	Loaiza	Lara; Rabitsch; Mejia	Lara; Yakob; Pasqué	2:45
10.	"Muñekita" (with El Alfa and JT)	Loaiza; Emanuel Herrera Batista; Jatavia Johnson	Chael Betances; Hector Mazzarri; Francisco Briceño Villa; Lorna Aponte Acosta; Rodney Donalds	Mazzarri; FABV; Jux-Chandler^{[v]}	3:39
11.	"Labios Mordidos" (with Karol G)	Loaiza; Carolina Giraldo Navarro; Cristina Chiluiza; Brandon Cores	Lara; Alberto Melendez	Lara; Albert Hype; Jux-Chandler^{[a]}	3:15
12.	"No Hay Ley Parte 2" (with Rauw Alejandro)	Loaiza; Raúl Ocasio Ruiz; Chiluiza; Servando Primera Mussett	Cristian Salazar; Pablo Díaz-Reixa; Jack Latham; Marcos Masís	Uchis; El Guincho; Jam City; Ovy on the Drums; Geeneus; Tainy; Yakob; Pasqué	3:08
13.	"Heladito"	Loaiza	Loaiza	Crocker; Jux-Chandler^{[a]}	2:24
14.	"Dame Beso / Muévete"	Loaiza	Loaiza; Martin Rodríguez Vicente; Giancarlo Calderon; Guillermo Parra	Cromo X; Gil Produc^{[c]}; Polo Parra^{[c]}; Jux-Chandler^{[a]}	3:35
Total length:					44:19

Orquídeas Parte 2 track listing
No.	Title	Lyrics	Music	Producer(s)	Length
15.	"Adicto"	Loaiza	Loaiza; Andy Seltzer; Vicky Farewell	Seltzer; Farewell	2:52
16.	"Young, Rich & In Love (Kaytranada Remix)"	Loaiza	Loaiza; Irvin Mejia; Jakob Rabitsch; Louis Kevin Celestin	Yakob; Pasqué; Celestin	3:52
17.	"Simple"	Loaiza	Loaiza; Jeff Hazin; Nick Ferraro; Stacey Shopsowitz	Hazin; Ferraro; Shopsowitz	3:22
18.	"Como Debe Ser"	Loaiza	Loaiza; Julio Reyes Copello	Copello	3:29
Total length:					57:55

Notes

- ^{^[c]} signifies a co-producer.
- ^{^[a]} signifies an additional producer.
- ^{^[v]} signifies a vocal producer.

== Personnel ==
Musicians

- Kali Uchis – vocals
- Jean Rodríguez – background vocals (track 3)
- Giampaolo Lamparelli – programming (track 3)
- Cameron Stone – cello (track 6)
- Paul Cartwright – string arrangement, violin (track 6)
- Raul Román – accordion (track 14)
- Isais Leclerc – bass guitar (track 14)
- Nicky Catarey – percussion (track 14)
- Fredy Junior – piano (track 14)
- Salvador D'Oleo – saxophone (track 14)
- Paul Nuñez – trumpet (track 14)

Technical

- Mike Bozzi – mastering (tracks 1–9, 11–14)
- Chael Produciendo – mastering, mixing (track 10)
- Neal Pogue – mixing (tracks 1–9, 11, 13)
- Prash "Engine-Earz" Mistry – mixing (track 12)
- Polo Parra – mixing (track 14)
- Austen Jux-Chandler – engineering
- Aleksi Godard – engineering (tracks 2, 10, 13), additional engineering (3)
- Luca Brown – engineering (tracks 2, 3, 6, 7, 9, 10, 13, 14)
- Enrique Larreal – engineering (track 3)
- Jena Rodríguez – engineering (track 3)
- Jack Doutt – mastering assistance (tracks 1–9, 11–14)

== Charts ==
Chart performance for Orquídeas
Chart (2024)	Peak position
Belgian Albums (Ultratop Flanders)	25
Belgian Albums (Ultratop Wallonia)	75
Canadian Albums (Billboard)	56
Dutch Albums (Album Top 100)	34
French Albums (SNEP)	41
German Albums (Offizielle Top 100)	47
Lithuanian Albums (AGATA)	57
New Zealand Albums (RMNZ)	39
Portuguese Albums (AFP)	33
Spanish Albums (Promusicae)	15
Swiss Albums (Schweizer Hitparade)	13
UK Albums (Official Charts)	99
UK R&B Albums (Official Charts)	5
US Billboard 200	2
US Latin Pop Albums (Billboard)	1
US Top Latin Albums (Billboard)	1

== See also ==
- 2024 in Latin music
- List of number-one Billboard Latin Albums from the 2020s

== Release history ==
Release formats for Orquideas
Region	Date	Format	Label	Ref.
Various	January 12, 2024	CD; digital download; streaming; vinyl	Geffen	
