= Kali Uchis =

American singer-songwriter (born 1994)

- Uchis in 2015
- Born: Karly Marina Loaiza; July 17, 1994 (age 32); Alexandria, Virginia, U.S.
- Citizenship: United States Colombia
- Occupation: Singer-songwriter
- Years active: 2012–present
- Partner: Don Toliver (2020–present)
- Children: 1
- Musical career
- Genres: R&B; neo soul; Latin Urban
- Works: Kali Uchis discography
- Labels: Virgin EMI; Interscope; Geffen; Capitol
- Website: www.kaliuchis.com

Karly Marina Loaiza (born July 17, 1994), known professionally as Kali Uchis (/ˈuːtʃis/ OO-cheess), is an American singer-songwriter. Her accolades include a Grammy Award, an American Music Award, two Billboard Music Awards, and four nominations for a Latin Grammy Award.

After releasing her debut mixtape Drunken Babble (2012), she gained recognition for her debut extended play, Por Vida (2015). She signed with Virgin EMI Records to release her debut studio album, Isolation (2018), which peaked at number 34 on the Billboard 200 and saw widespread acclaim. She then signed with Interscope Records to release her second studio album and first Spanish-language project, Sin Miedo (del Amor y Otros Demonios) (2020). It spawned the single "Telepatía", first gained virality on TikTok and marked her first entry on the Billboard Hot 100 at number 25, also receiving double platinum certification by the Recording Industry Association of America (RIAA).

Uchis' third studio album, Red Moon in Venus (2023), peaked at number four on the Billboard 200. Her fourth and fifth studio albums, Orquídeas (2024) and Sincerely (2025), both peaked at number two. As of 2026, Uchis has sold over 29 million certified units from the RIAA between albums and songs.

== Early life ==
Karly Marina Loaiza was born on July 17, 1994, in Alexandria, Virginia, a suburb of Washington, D.C. Her father is Colombian and her mother was American. Her parents met during the late 1980s, and her father moved back to Colombia when Uchis was in high school. She is the youngest of five children. Loaiza resided in Pereira, the city of origin of her father. She subsequently spent summers in Colombia with her father, uncles, and aunts. During the school year, she lived with her mother and older siblings. In high school, she learned to play the piano and saxophone. She participated in a jazz band, and graduated from Alexandria City High School (then called T. C. Williams High School). She often skipped class to spend time at the photo lab, making experimental short films. Her interest in photography led to her creating mixtape cover art. Skipping class and breaking the curfew set by her parents led to her being kicked out of her home. During this time, she lived in her car and wrote songs on her keyboard which would later appear on her debut mixtape Drunken Babble (2012). She also wrote poetry and did not initially intend to sing, being more interested in directing films than being in the spotlight. She was given the nickname "Karluchis", which she would later modify and use as "Kali Uchis".

== Career ==
=== 2012–2016: Drunken Babble and Por Vida ===
Shortly after graduating, Uchis released her debut mixtape, Drunken Babble, on August 1, 2012. The mixtape was described as "genre-defying", noted for its influences from doo-wop, reggae and early 2000s R&B. In 2014, she collaborated with rapper Snoop Dogg on the song "On Edge" for his mixtape, That's My Work 3.

In February 2015, Uchis released her debut EP Por Vida for free download on her official website, and later on iTunes. The project featured production from various musicians, including Diplo, Tyler, the Creator, Kaytranada and BadBadNotGood. She embarked on her first tour in October 2015 with Leon Bridges, touring through the United States and parts of Canada.

=== 2017–2018: Breakthrough with Isolation ===
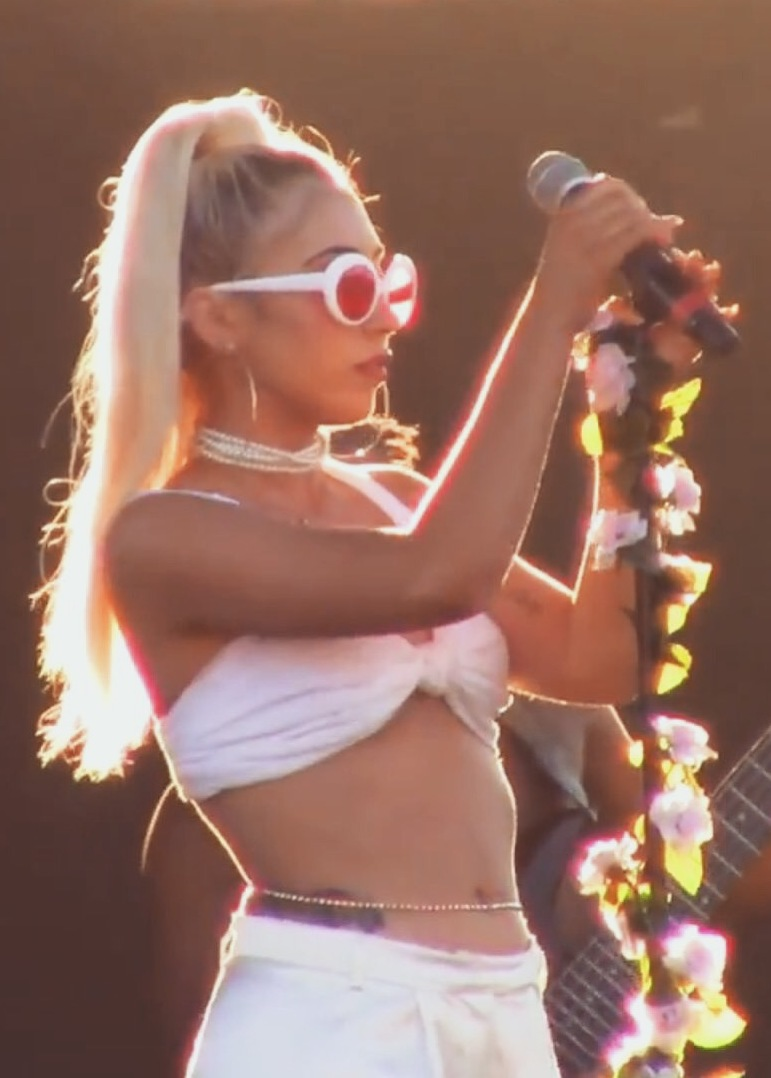
Uchis performing in 2017

In April 2017, the fifth studio album by Gorillaz, Humanz, was released and included songs featuring Uchis — namely "She's My Collar"; "Ticker Tape" – a bonus track from the album's Deluxe Edition; and "She's My Collar (Kali Uchis Spanish Special)" – a bonus track from the album's Super Deluxe Edition. The following month, Uchis released "Tyrant", featuring English singer Jorja Smith, to serve as the lead single from her then-upcoming debut studio album. In June 2017, she announced her first headlining tour, specifically a North American tour in support of the album. The tour took place from August to October 2017, starting at the Outside Lands Music and Arts Festival in San Francisco, with a stop at the Pop Montreal music festival. Uchis then released "Nuestro Planeta", featuring Reykon, as the second single from the album, on August 25, 2017. In October 2017, Uchis was nominated for a Latin Grammy Award for Record of the Year for "El Ratico", her collaboration with Colombian musician Juanes. She was also nominated for a Grammy Award for Best R&B Performance at the 60th Annual Grammy Awards for "Get You", her collaboration with Canadian singer Daniel Caesar.

Uchis supported Lana Del Rey on select North American arena dates of her world tour, the LA to the Moon Tour, from January 15 to February 16, 2018. "After the Storm", a track featuring Tyler, the Creator and Bootsy Collins, was issued as the third single in January 2018, followed by the announcement of Isolation, in March 2018, which took place during Uchis' appearance on The Tonight Show. Isolation was officially released worldwide on April 6, 2018. It received widespread acclaim from critics. At Metacritic, which assigns a normalized rating out of 100 to reviews from mainstream publications, the album received an average score of 87, based on 17 reviews. The album's fourth and final single, "Just a Stranger", featuring Steve Lacy, was released on October 29, 2018.

=== 2019–2021: To Feel Alive and Sin Miedo (del Amor y Otros Demonios) ===
In June 2019, Uchis collaborated with American R&B band Free Nationals and American rapper Mac Miller on the single "Time", which was the first official posthumous release by Miller since his death on September 7, 2018. In December 2019, Uchis released "Solita", originally planned to be the lead single of her upcoming second studio album, it was later excluded from the final tracklist. However, the song would be included as a bonus track on the vinyl release of the album. On December 9, 2019, Kali Uchis was featured on the single "10%" by Canadian producer Kaytranada, which was taken from his album Bubba. The song would go onto win a Grammy Award for Best Dance Recording at the 63rd Annual Grammy Awards. Later on, Uchis was featured on Little Dragon's 6th studio album, New Me, Same Us for a remix of the song, "Are You Feeling Sad?". April 24, 2020, Uchis released an extended play titled To Feel Alive. The EP was recorded entirely in isolation due to the COVID-19 pandemic.

On February 27, 2020, Uchis appeared in Thundercat's music video for "Dragonball Durag".

On August 7, 2020, Uchis released the song "Aquí Yo Mando" alongside American rapper Rico Nasty. The song was previously previewed in an episode of the HBO series Insecure. "Aquí Yo Mando" serves as the lead single from Uchis' second studio album, Sin Miedo (del Amor y Otros Demonios), which is her first project predominantly sung in Spanish. "La Luz" with Jhay Cortez was released as the album's second single on October 1, 2020. Later that month, a music video for the song was released on October 26. On November 6, the album's pre order was released, with the track list later being revealed on November 13. On November 17, "Te Pongo Mal (Préndelo)" with Jowell & Randy, was released as the album's sole promotional single. The album was released on November 18, 2020, and would peak at number 1 on the Billboard Top Latin Albums Chart.

Following a lip-sync challenge on the platform TikTok, "Telepatía" from Uchis' second studio album saw a surge in popularity in early 2021. Before being issued as a single, the song debuted inside the top 10 of Billboard's Hot Latin Songs chart and later reached the summit of the chart on the week of May 22, 2021. The song also reached number three on Spotify's US Top 50 and number two on the service's Global Top 50. "Telepatía" peaked at number 25 on the Billboard Hot 100. Following the resurgence of the song, the success garnered Sin Miedo (del Amor y Otros Demonios) to chart on the Billboard 200, peaking at number 52. On June 18, 2021, her boyfriend Don Toliver released a collaboration with Uchis titled "Drugs N Hella Melodies", which was issued as the second single from Toliver's second studio album, Life of a Don. On September 29, 2021, Uchis released the single "Fue Mejor" with SZA. The song is featured as a bonus track on the deluxe edition of Sin Miedo (del Amor y Otros Demonios).

=== 2022–2024: Red Moon in Venus and Orquídeas ===
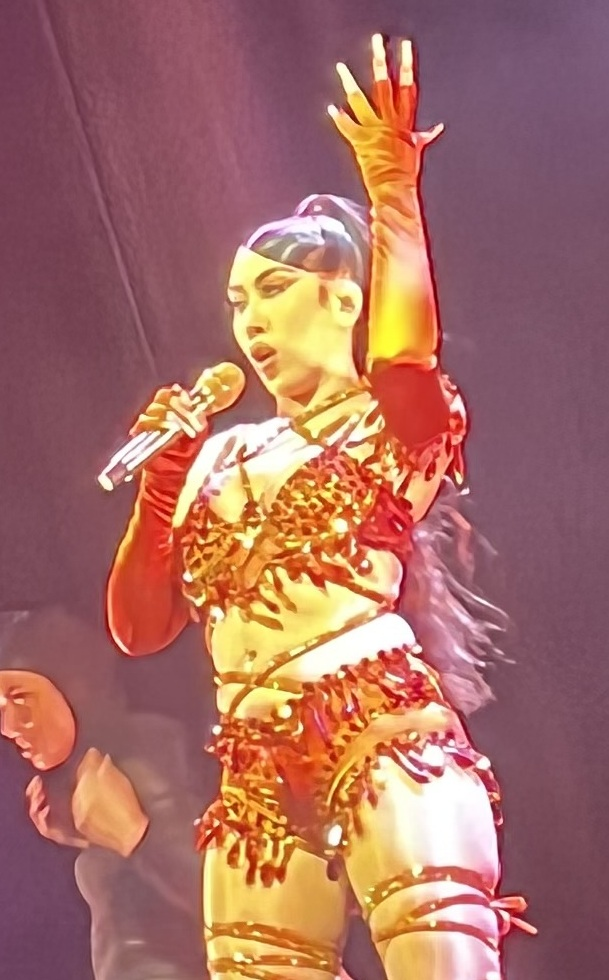
Uchis performing at Madison Square Garden during Tyler, the Creator's Call Me If You Get Lost Tour in 2022.

On April 21, 2022, Uchis announced on the red carpet of the Latin American Music Awards that she has completed her third and fourth studio albums, with one in Spanish and one in English. On August 15, 2022, she shared a snippet of a house-influenced song titled "No Hay Ley" on her social media, which was released as a single on September 2, 2022.

On January 19, 2023, Uchis released the song "I Wish You Roses", alongside a music video, as the first single for her upcoming album. On January 23, 2023, Uchis announced her third studio album, Red Moon in Venus, which was released on March 3, 2023, with an accompanying tour featuring special guest Raye. The tour began on April 25, 2023, in Austin, Texas and concluded on May 30, 2023, in Phoenix, Arizona. On February 15, 2023, Uchis' boyfriend Don Toliver released a collaboration with her titled "4 Me", a single for Toliver's studio album Love Sick. On February 24, 2023, Uchis released the song "Moonlight" as the second single for Red Moon in Venus, featuring production credits from Benny Blanco, Cashmere Cat, and Leon Michels. Red Moon in Venus was released on March 3, 2023, featuring guest appearances from Omar Apollo, Toliver, and Summer Walker.

In July 2023, Uchis announced a "new era" for her music, along with a new single titled "Muñekita", with Dominican rapper El Alfa and American rapper JT from City Girls, as the first single for her upcoming album. The single was released on August 4, 2023. On August 11, 2023 "Mañana Será Bonito (Bichota Season)" album of the Colombian singer Karol G was released on which Uchis collaborated on the song "Me tengo que ir". On October 11, 2023, Uchis announced her fourth studio album, titled Orquídeas, which released on January 12, 2024, alongside the album's cover art. On October 16, 2023, Uchis announced the second single, titled "Te Mata", for her upcoming fourth album, released on October 20, 2023, alongside the music video. On July 31, 2024, Uchis announced a follow up to Orquídeas, titled Orquídeas Parte 2. It was released on August 9, 2024. On September 17, 2024, Uchis released her self-care line, "homebody by Uchis", which includes beauty products, homegoods, and apparel with a focus on clean ingredients.

=== 2025–present: Sincerely ===
In early 2025, Uchis has been featured in the song "Damn Right" by Jennie from her debut album, Ruby, with additional guest appearance by Childish Gambino.

On March 17, 2025, Uchis revealed the title for her fifth studio album Sincerely. The album was released on May 9, 2025. On March 18, 2025, she announced her first album's single "Sunshine & Rain…", via TikTok, released on March 27, 2025, alongside the music video 2 days later. The album's second single "ILYSMIH" was released on April 25, 2025. The deluxe edition, Sincerely: P.S., was released on October 3, 2025, with 5 additional tracks.

On December 19, 2025, Uchis released a new single, Muévelo, which was previously a leaked song from her fourth album, Orquídeas.

In March 2026, Uchis announced a joint summer tour with Mariah the Scientist, the "For The Girls Tour".

In November 2026, Uchis was featured in the song Largate with Helado Negro part of the Grand Theft Auto VI: The Album.

== Artistic influences ==
Uchis stated that she is influenced by music of the 1960s, with its mix of early soul, R&B and doo-wop, saying: "Musically and aesthetically, the culture of it just inspires me." She also mentioned that she enjoys jazz, stating during her career beginnings that she draws musical inspiration from Ella Fitzgerald and Billie Holiday. Other musicians she cited as influences on her sound are Björk, Curtis Mayfield, Loose Ends, Ralfi Pagan, and Irma Thomas. She also takes influences from Celia Cruz, Mariah Carey, La Lupe, Lana Del Rey, Selena, Shakira and Ivy Queen.

== Personal life ==
Uchis is bisexual and has often reflected this in her music and public image. She has been in a relationship with American rapper Don Toliver since 2020. In January 2024, she announced that she was expecting her first child with Toliver via the music video for her songs "Tu Corazón Es Mío" and "Diosa". She gave birth to a son in March 2024. Since then she had honored her son's privacy from social media.

Uchis was estranged from her mother. After the birth of Uchis' son in 2024, the two reconciled; her mother died from lung cancer in 2025. Uchis dedicated the album Sincerely to her and sampled her mother's voice in the song "Sunshine & Rain…".

== Discography ==
Studio albums

- Isolation (2018)
- Sin Miedo (del Amor y Otros Demonios) (2020)
- Red Moon in Venus (2023)
- Orquídeas (2024)
- Sincerely (2025)

== Accolades ==
List of awards and nominations
| Award | Year (Note: Indicates the year of ceremony. Each year is linked to the article about the awards held that year, wherever possible.) | Recipient(s) and nominee(s) | Category | Result | Ref. |
|---|---|---|---|---|---|
| American Music Awards | 2021 | "Telepatía" | Favorite Song - Latin | Won | |
| American Music Awards | 2021 | Sin Miedo (del Amor y Otros Demonios) | Favorite Album - Latin | Nominated | |
| American Music Awards | 2021 | Herself | Favorite Female Artist – Latin | Nominated | |
| American Music Awards | 2022 | Herself | Favorite Female Artist – Latin | Nominated | |
| ASCAP Pop Music Awards | 2022 | "Telepatía" | Winning Songwriters | Won | |
| Billboard Latin Music Awards | 2021 | "Telepatía" | Hot Latin Song of the Year | Nominated | |
| Billboard Latin Music Awards | 2021 | "Telepatía" | Latin Pop Song of the Year | Nominated | |
| Billboard Latin Music Awards | 2021 | Sin Miedo (del Amor y Otros Demonios) | Latin Pop Album of the Year | Won | |
| Billboard Latin Music Awards | 2021 | Herself | New Artist of the Year | Nominated | |
| Billboard Latin Music Awards | 2021 | Herself | Hot Latin Songs Artist of the Year, Female | Nominated | |
| Billboard Latin Music Awards | 2021 | Herself | Top Latin Albums Artist of the Year, Female | Nominated | |
| Billboard Latin Music Awards | 2021 | Herself | Latin Pop Artist of the Year | Nominated | |
| Billboard Latin Music Awards | 2022 | Herself | Latin Pop Artist of the Year | Nominated | |
| Billboard Latin Music Awards | 2022 | Herself | Hot Latin Songs Artist of the Year, Female | Nominated | |
| Billboard Latin Music Awards | 2022 | Herself | Top Latin Albums Artist of the Year, Female | Nominated | |
| Billboard Latin Music Awards | 2023 | Herself | Top Latin Albums Artist of the Year, Female | Nominated | |
| Billboard Latin Music Awards | 2024 | Herself | Top Latin Albums Artist of the Year, Female | Nominated | |
| Billboard Latin Music Awards | 2024 | Herself | Hot Latin Songs Artist of the Year, Female | Nominated | |
| Billboard Latin Music Awards | 2024 | Herself | Latin Pop Artist of the Year | Nominated | |
| Billboard Latin Music Awards | 2024 | Orquídeas | Latin Pop Album of the Year | Won | |
| Billboard Music Awards | 2022 | Sin Miedo (del Amor y Otros Demonios) | Top Latin Album | Nominated | |
| Billboard Music Awards | 2022 | "Telepatía" | Top Latin Song | Won | |
| Billboard Music Awards | 2022 | Herself | Top Latin Artist | Nominated | |
| Billboard Music Awards | 2022 | Herself | Top Latin Female Artist | Won | |
| Billboard Music Awards | 2024 | Herself | Top Latin Female Artist | Nominated | |
| Grammy Awards | 2018 | "Get You" (with Daniel Caesar) | Best R&B Performance | Nominated | |
| Grammy Awards | 2021 | "10%" (with Kaytranada) | Best Dance Recording | Won | |
| Grammy Awards | 2022 | Sin Miedo (del Amor y Otros Demonios) | Best Música Urbana Album | Nominated | |
| Grammy Awards | 2025 | Orquídeas | Best Latin Pop Album | Nominated | |
| Heat Latin Music Awards | 2021 | Herself | Best Female Artist | Nominated | |
| Heat Latin Music Awards | 2024 | Herself | Best Female Artist | Nominated | |
| Heat Latin Music Awards | 2024 | Orquídeas | Album of the Year | Nominated | |
| iHeartRadio Music Awards | 2023 | Herself | Best New Latin Artist | Won | |
| Latin American Music Awards | 2021 | Sin Miedo (del Amor y Otros Demonios) | Favorite Pop Album | Nominated | |
| Latin American Music Awards | 2022 | Herself | New Artist of the Year | Nominated | |
| Latin American Music Awards | 2022 | Herself | Favorite Female Artist | Nominated | |
| Latin American Music Awards | 2022 | Herself | Favorite Pop Artist | Nominated | |
| Latin American Music Awards | 2022 | "Telepatía" | Song of the Year | Nominated | |
| Latin American Music Awards | 2022 | "Telepatía" | Favorite Pop Song | Nominated | |
| Latin American Music Awards | 2022 | "Telepatía" | Viral Song of the Year | Nominated | |
| Latin American Music Awards | 2023 | Herself | Favorite Pop Artist | Nominated | |
| Latin American Music Awards | 2024 | Orquídeas | Favorite Pop Album | Won | |
| Latin Grammy Award | 2017 | "El Ratico" (with Juanes) | Record of the Year | Nominated | |
| Latin Grammy Award | 2024 | "Igual que un Ángel" (with Peso Pluma) | Record of the Year | Nominated | |
| Latin Grammy Award | 2024 | "Igual que un Ángel" (with Peso Pluma) | Best Pop Song | Nominated | |
| Latin Grammy Award | 2024 | Orquídeas | Best Pop Vocal Album | Nominated | |
| Latin Grammy Award | 2024 | "Labios Mordidos" (with Karol G) | Best Reggaeton Performance | Nominated | |
| MTV Millennial Awards | 2021 | "Telepatía" | Video of The Year | Nominated | |
| MTV Millennial Awards | 2021 | "Telepatía" | Hit of The Year | Nominated | |
| MTV Millennial Awards | 2024 | "Igual que un Ángel" (with Peso Pluma) | Collaboration of the Year | Nominated | |
| Lo Nuestro Awards | 2022 | Herself | New Artist of the Year - Female | Nominated | |
| Lo Nuestro Awards | 2022 | "Telepatía" | Song of the Year | Nominated | |
| Lo Nuestro Awards | 2022 | "Telepatía" | Pop Song of the Year | Nominated | |
| Lo Nuestro Awards | 2022 | Sin Miedo (del Amor y Otros Demonios) | Pop Album of the Year | Nominated | |
| Premios Juventud | 2021 | Herself | The New Generation - Female | Won | |
| Premios Juventud | 2021 | Herself | The Trendiest Artist | Nominated | |
| Premios Juventud | 2021 | "¡aquí yo mando!" (featuring Rico Nasty) | Girl Power | Nominated | |
| Premios Juventud | 2022 | Herself | Rising Female Artist | Nominated | |
| Premios Juventud | 2022 | Herself | Female Youth Artist | Nominated | |
| Premios Juventud | 2024 | "Muñekita" (with El Alfa & JT) | OMG Collaboration | Nominated | |
| Premios Juventud | 2024 | "Labios Mordidos" (with Karol G) | Girl Power | Won | |
| Premios Nuestra Tierra | 2021 | Best New Artist | Herself | Won | |
| Premios Nuestra Tierra | 2021 | Best Alternative/Rock/Indie Artist | Herself | Nominated | |
| Premios Nuestra Tierra | 2021 | "Telepatía" | Best Alternative/Rock/Indie Song | Won | |
| Premios Nuestra Tierra | 2021 | "10%" (with Kaytranada) | Best Dance/Electro Song | Nominated | |
| Premios Nuestra Tierra | 2022 | Herself | Best Alternative/Rock/Indie Artist | Nominated | |
| Soul Train Music Award | 2018 | Herself | Best New Artist | Nominated | |
| Soul Train Music Award | 2026 | R&B/Soul Song of The Year | Is It A Crime? (with Mariah the Scientist) | Pending | |
| UK Music Video Award | 2018 | "After the Storm" (featuring Tyler, the Creator and Bootsy Collins) | Best Urban Video - International | Nominated | |
| UK Music Video Award | 2018 | "After the Storm" (featuring Tyler, the Creator and Bootsy Collins) | Best Production Design in a Video | Nominated | |
| Variety Hitmakers | 2021 | Herself | Crossover Award | Won | |
| WME Awards | 2023 | "Moonlight" | Latin American Song | Nominated | |

In May 2024, Uchis was honored with the Rising Star award at the Billboard Latin Women in Music gala, in recognition of her contributions to Latin pop and her influence across bilingual audiences.

== Tours ==
Headlining

- Kali Uchis Tour (2017)

| Date (2017) | City | Country | Venue |
|---|---|---|---|
| August 11 | San Francisco | United States | Golden Gate Park (Outside Lands) |
| September 12 | Boston | United States | The Royale |
| September 13 | Montreal | Canada | Théâtre Fairmount (POP Montreal) |
| September 14 | Toronto | Canada | Danforth Music Hall |
| September 15 | Detroit | United States | El Club |
| September 17 | Minneapolis | United States | 7th Street Entry |
| September 20 | Vancouver | Canada | Biltmore Cabaret |
| September 21 | Seattle | United States | The Crocodile |
| September 22 | Portland | United States | Hawthorne Theatre |
| September 24 | Las Vegas | United States | Fremont Street (Life Is Beautiful) |
| September 28 | Los Angeles | United States | The Fonda Theatre |
| September 30 | San Diego | United States | The Observatory North Park |
| October 1 | Phoenix | United States | Valley Bar |
| October 4 | Dallas | United States | Trees Dallas |
| October 5 | Austin | United States | Come and Take It Live |
| October 7 | Houston | United States | Warehouse Live |
| October 8 | New Orleans | United States | Republic NOLA |
| October 10 | Nashville | United States | 3rd & Lindsley |
| October 11 | Atlanta | United States | Center Stage Theatre |
| October 13 | Miami | United States | Mana Wynwood |
| October 14 | Orlando | United States | The Social |
| October 16 | Carrboro | United States | Cat's Cradle |
| October 17 | Washington, D.C. | United States | U Street Music Hall |
| October 18 | Philadelphia | United States | World Cafe Live |
| October 20 | New York City | United States | Bowery Ballroom |
| October 21 | Brooklyn | United States | Music Hall of Williamsburg |

- In Your Dreams Tour (2018)

| Date (2018) | City | Country | Venue |
|---|---|---|---|
| September 13 | Seattle | United States | Showbox SoDo |
| September 14 | Portland | United States | Roseland Theater |
| September 15 | Vancouver | Canada | Westward Music Festival |
| September 17 | San Francisco | United States | The Warfield Theatre |
| September 20 | Santa Ana | United States | The Observatory |
| September 21 | Los Angeles | United States | Shrine Exposition Hall |
| September 22 | Phoenix | United States | The Van Buren |
| September 25 | Dallas | United States | Bomb Factory |
| September 27 | Austin | United States | Stubb's Waller Creek Amphitheater |
| September 28 | Houston | United States | House of Blues |
| October 2 | Orlando | United States | The Beacham Theatre |
| October 3 | Fort Lauderdale | United States | Revolution |
| October 5 | Atlanta | United States | Tabernacle |
| October 6 | Charlotte | United States | The Fillmore |
| October 7 | Raleigh | United States | The Ritz |
| October 9 | Washington, D.C. | United States | 9:30 Club |
| October 12 | New York City | United States | Terminal 5 |
| October 15 | Philadelphia | United States | Theatre of Living Arts |
| October 16 | Boston | United States | House of Blues |
| October 18 | Toronto | Canada | Rebel |
| October 20 | Grand Rapids | United States | 20 Monroe Live |
| October 21 | Royal Oak | United States | Royal Oak Music Theatre |
| October 23 | Minneapolis | United States | First Avenue |

- Red Moon in Venus Tour (2023)
- The Sincerely, Tour (2025)

Co-headlining

- The Kali & Jorja Tour (with Jorja Smith) (2019)
- For The Girls Tour (with Mariah the Scientist) (2026)
