= God Said No World Tour =

2024 concert tour by Omar Apollo

- Tour by Omar Apollo
- Location: Oceania; Asia; North America
- Associated album: God Said No
- Start date: July 15, 2024
- End date: October 11, 2024
- Legs: 3
- No. of shows: 33
- Supporting acts: Kevin Abstract; Malcolm Todd; Ravyn Lenae; Forest Claudette

Omar Apollo concert chronology
- The Prototype Tour (2022); God Said No World Tour (2024)

The God Said No World Tour was the fifth concert tour by American singer and songwriter Omar Apollo in support of his second studio album, God Said No (2024). It began on July 15, 2024, in Melbourne, with shows across North America, Oceania and Asia. It concluded in San Diego on October 11 comprising 33 shows. Kevin Abstract, Malcolm Todd and Ravyn Lenae served as the opening acts for the North American leg. Forest Claudette served as the opening act for the Oceania leg.

== Background ==
On June 6, 2024, Apollo formally announced the tour, with 33 shows across Oceania, Asia and North America from July through October 2024. Tickets went on sale on June 14, with an artist presale running from June 12.

== Set list ==
The following set list is obtained from the July 15, 2024 show in Melbourne, Australia. It is not intended to represent all dates throughout the tour.

1. “Useless”
2. “Killing Me”
3. “Endlessly”
4. “3 Boys”
5. “Ugotme”
6. “Done With You”
7. “Petrified”
8. “ Drifting”
9. “How”
10. “Invincible”
11. “Tamagotchi”
12. “Kamikaze”
13. “Found Heaven”
14. “Against Me”
15. “Less of You”
16. “Spite”
17. “Dispose of Me”
18. “Evergreen”

== Tour dates ==
List of 2024 concerts, showing date, city, country, venue, opening acts, attendance and gross revenue
Date (2024)	City	Country	Venue	Opening act(s)
July 15	Melbourne	Australia	Festival Hall	Forest Claudette
July 18	Sydney	Australia	Hordern Pavilion	Forest Claudette
July 19	Brisbane	Australia	Fortitude Music Hall	Forest Claudette
July 21 (Note: The show on July 21, 2024, is set to be a part of We The Fest.)	Jakarta	Indonesia	Gelora Bung Karno Sports Complex	—N/a
July 25	Tokyo	Japan	Kanda Square	—N/a
July 26 (Note: The show on July 26, 2024, is set to be a part of Fuji Rock Festival.)	Naeba	Japan	Naeba Ski Resort	—N/a
August 20	Indianapolis	United States	Everwise Amphitheater	Malcolm Todd
August 21	Sterling Heights	United States	Michigan Lottery Amphitheatre	Malcolm Todd
August 23	Chicago	United States	Huntington Bank Pavilion	Malcolm Todd
August 25	Philadelphia	United States	Skyline Stage	Malcolm Todd
September 3	Columbia	United States	Merriweather Post Pavilion	Malcolm Todd
September 4	Toronto	Canada	Budweiser Stage	Malcolm Todd
September 6	Boston	United States	Leader Bank Pavilion	Malcolm Todd
September 7	Forest Hills	United States	Forest Hills Stadium	Malcolm Todd
September 10	Cincinnati	United States	The ICON Festival Stage	Malcolm Todd
September 11	Raleigh	United States	Red Hat Amphitheater	Malcolm Todd
September 13	Charlotte	United States	Skyla Credit Union Amphitheatre	Malcolm Todd
September 14	Atlanta	United States	Cadence Bank Amphitheatre	Malcolm Todd
September 16	Miami	United States	FPL Solar Amphitheater	Malcolm Todd
September 17	Orlando	United States	Orlando Amphitheater	Malcolm Todd
September 19	Houston	United States	White Oak Music Hall	Malcolm Todd
September 21	Austin	United States	Moody Amphitheater	Malcolm Todd
September 22	Irving	United States	The Pavilion at Toyota Music Factory	Malcolm Todd
September 24	Bentonville	United States	The Momentary	Malcolm Todd
September 26	Morrison	United States	Red Rocks Amphitheatre	Malcolm Todd; Kevin Abstract; Ravyn Lenae
September 29	Vancouver	Canada	Thunderbird Sports Centre	Kevin Abstract
October 1	Seattle	United States	WaMu Theater	Kevin Abstract
October 2	Troutdale	United States	Edgefield Concerts	Kevin Abstract
October 4	Berkeley	United States	The Greek Theatre	Kevin Abstract
October 5	Los Angeles	United States	Hollywood Bowl	Malcolm Todd; Kevin Abstract
October 8	Santa Barbara	United States	Santa Barbara Bowl	Kevin Abstract
October 10	Mesa	United States	Mesa Amphitheatre	Kevin Abstract
October 11	San Diego	United States	The Rady Shell at Jacobs Park	Kevin Abstract
