= Red, White & Royal Blue (soundtrack) =

Red, White & Royal Blue (Amazon Original Motion Picture Soundtrack)

Soundtrack album by Drum & Lace
- Released: August 11, 2023
- Recorded: 2023
- Genre: Film score
- Length: 43:10
- Label: Lakeshore Records

Drum & Lace chronology
Cobweb (2023)	Red, White & Royal Blue (2023)

Singles from Red, White & Royal Blue (Amazon Original Motion Picture Soundtrack)
- 1. "If I Loved You" Released: July 27, 2023; 2. "Fruit (Red, White & Royal Blue Version)" Released: August 4, 2023

Red, White & Royal Blue (Amazon Original Motion Picture Soundtrack) is the soundtrack to the 2023 film Red, White & Royal Blue directed by Matthew López, based on Casey McQuiston's 2019 novel. The soundtrack features 27 tracks — two songs ("If I Loved You" and "Fruit (Red, White & Royal Blue Version)" by Vagabon and Oliver Sim respectively) released as singles, and 25 instrumental tracks composed by Sofia Hultquist aka Drum & Lace. It was released by Lakeshore Records on August 11, 2023.

== Background ==
Drum & Lace was confirmed to compose the music for the film in April 2023. She started working on the score after finishing her compositions for the horror film Cobweb and had a chance to lean the music into the emotional weight and importance of the story, as well as a chance to write thematically, giving unique sounds and instrumentations to each characters. Although she co-composed the music for the 2022 film Rosaline with her husband Ian, she felt that the film offered her a deep insight on the musical themes.

The soundtrack further accompanied two songs from the film. "If I Loved You", the song from the 1945 Rodgers and Hammerstein musical Carousel was covered by Vagabon for the film, who claimed it as an "exercise in discovery". López, who had been a playwright, liked her voice and sound that "married to that classical music theater" as she wanted to "preserve the melodic information that makes this song from the original musical so special while reimagining the instrumentation and arrangement". The song was released as a promotional single from the album on July 27, 2023.

Lopez further asked The xx band frontman Oliver Sim for an original composition, but after watching the early cut of the film, he decided to have one of his songs covered for the film. His song "Fruit" which released through his 2022 album Hideous Bastard, was reworked as an orchestral version specifically for the film. As Sim claimed that he made the acoustic version, he further wanted to make the cinematic version of that track, which López had claimed "He took something very delicate and blew it up to these epic proportions. It sounds so swoon-y and hopeful. That was a big win, for me, to get him to do that." This song was released as the second single on August 4, 2023.

The soundtrack was released by Lakeshore Records on August 11, the same day as the film. A track from the score "First Kiss" was exclusively made available through Screen Rant on August 7, 2023, four days before the film and album release. In addition to the album's digital release, it was further set to be made available in 180-gram picture disc vinyl LP with all of its 27 tracks in either sides of the record. The album art accompanied a still from the film with its lead actors, with the record itself covered with the flag of United States and United Kingdom. It is set to be released sometime in January 2024.

== Track listing ==
All music is composed by Drum & Lace, except where noted.

No.	Title	Writer(s)	Producer(s)	Length
1.	"If I Loved You" (Vagabon)	Oscar Hammerstein II; Richard Rodgers	Vagabon	2:52
2.	"Buckingham Palace"			1:38
3.	"Anxious Alex"			0:33
4.	"Press Day"			2:27
5.	"Soft Side"			1:00
6.	"Later Your Majesty"			0:48
7.	"Text Bants"			1:36
8.	"First Kiss"			1:11
9.	"Red Room"			1:00
10.	"Or I"ll Else I"ll Vanish"			1:15
11.	"In Good Hands"			3:02
12.	"Pillow Talk"			1:05
13.	"Twenty-Seven"			1:06
14.	"Texas"			2:16
15.	"I"m Coming In"			1:50
16.	"Dear Henry"			1:22
17.	"Lost in a Moment"			1:18
18.	"Dive Deep"			1:03
19.	"Tell Me to Leave"			2:10
20.	"Museum"			1:26
21.	"Runway Goodbyes"			0:46
22.	"Leaked Emails"			2:03
23.	"No Turning Back"			1:45
24.	"Election Night"			2:20
25.	"Openhearted Fearless and Alive"			1:07
26.	"We Won"			1:11
27.	"Fruit (Red, White & Royal Blue Version)" (Oliver Sim)	Alex Peringer; James Smith; Oliver Sim	Casey MQ; Nathan Jenkins	2:49
Total length:				43:10

== Curated soundtrack ==
Lopez recruited Kristen Higuera and Maggie Phillips as music supervisors for selecting the songs. While some tracks such as Queen's "Don't Stop Me Now" and Lil Jon's "Get Low" featured in the book as well as in the film, Lopez, at certain instances did not want to include all the songs that were mentioned in the book. The dance sequence between Alex and Henry at Victoria and Albert Museum in London, was soundtracked by the Elton John single "Your Song" in the book, but it does not feature in the film, as the scene he envisioned did not have the song played. Instead Elvis Presley's "Can't Help Falling in Love" which was covered by Perfume Genius was instead played in that sequence. The original song was supposed to be an onset placeholder for the film, until the newly recorded version released in 2016 was finalised.

Track listing

1. "All I Really Want Is You" by The Marias
2. "3 Boys" by Omar Apollo
3. "Tu-Bardh" by Clanadonia
4. "Le Canal Saint Martin" by Maria Remusal
5. "City of Lost Souls" by Tim Koss
6. "Nighttime in Harlem" by Benny Reid
7. "Shining Armor" by Mamalarky
8. "Alejandra" by Luis Perez Meza
9. "Canciones De Amor A Ti" by Rigoberta Bandini
10. "Don't Stop Me Now" by Queen (Performed by Nicholas Galitzine)
11. "Can't Help Falling in Love" by Perfume Genius
12. "Momentary" by Edvard Kravchuk
13. "Color My Life" by Chicano Batman String Quartet
14. "No. 10 in E Flat Major, D. 87: IV. Allegro" by Franz Schubert
15. "Bad Reputation" by Joan Jett
16. "Duda Dance" by ĠENN
17. "Up the Hill Backwards" by David Bowie
18. "Beautyful Beauti" by Brainstory
19. "Rudolph, The Red-Nosed Reindeer" by Billy May
20. "The Thing You Do (LHOTSE Remix)" by Ellem
21. "Echalo Pa Ca" by Sofia Reyes, Darell and Lalo Ebratt
22. "Que Calor" by Major Lazer, J Balvin and El Alfa
23. "Tití Me Preguntó" by Bad Bunny
24. "Get Low" by Lil' Jon & the East Side Boyz featuring Ying Yang Twins
25. "Magic" by David From Barberton
26. "Party in The Hague" by DJ Roc
27. "Johann Sebastian Bach "Goldberg Variations, BWV 988: Variation 17" by Pi-hsien Chen
28. "Piano Sonata No. 11 in A, K331 – "Alla Turga": 3 Alla Turca (Allegretto)" by Alfred Brendel

== Reception ==
Lovia Gyarkaye of The Hollywood Reporter complimented the score as "great". Benjamin Lee of The Guardian praised Drum & Lace's score as "one of the positive aspects of the film". Jeff Conway of Forbes wrote "The movie’s soundtrack quickly becomes its own important character in effectively telling this story."

== Release history ==
Release dates and formats for Red, White & Royal Blue (Amazon Original Motion Picture Soundtrack)
Region	Date	Format(s)	Label	Ref.
Various	August 11, 2023	Digital download; streaming	Lakeshore	
Various	January 2024	Vinyl	Lakeshore	
