= Ice Slippin =

Single by Omar Apollo

from the EP Live for Me
- Released: August 26, 2023
- Genre: Synth-pop
- Length: 4:15
- Label: Warner
- Songwriters: Teo Halm, Omar Velasco
- Producers: Teo Halm, Omar Velasco

Omar Apollo singles chronology
"3 Boys" (2023)	"Ice Slippin" (2023)	"Live For Me" (2023)

"Ice Slippin" is a song by American singer-songwriter Omar Apollo. It was released on 25 August 2023 through Warner Records. The song was inspired by Apollo's experience of coming out to his family.

== Background ==
"Ice Slippin" was Apollo's second single of 2023 and the first track from his EP Live For Me. Apollo first teased the song in May 2023, posting a snippet to his social media. Apollo explained that the song is about "reliving the thoughts I had passing through my mind the winter I came out to my family, receiving cold judgment as opposed to the acceptance I felt I deserved. This song is a reflection and reaction of all the emotions I had to face before and after I decided to leave the icy streets of Indiana."

Before the song's release, "Ice Slippin" was promoted with three life-size ice sculptures of Apollo, located in Los Angeles, New York and London.

The song was written and produced by Apollo and his frequent collaborator Teo Halm.

== Music video ==
The New York duo Rubberband directed the song's music video. The video represents the "final millisecond of one's life", showing Apollo in an icy environment, cut with photos and home videos of his family and younger years.

The music video was short-listed for Best Music Video at the 2023 Ciclope Festival Awards.

== Critical reception ==
Suzy Exposito of the Los Angeles Times wrote, "the song and video paint an evocative portrait of a young gay man who is pushed to make an impossible choice: to live as his most authentic self or to be part of a family he loves dearly." Robin Murray of Clash said, "Omar has a way with words that taps straight to the heart". Joshua Donovan of DNA noted, "His lyrics read like a reflective journal entry but also like a form of catharsis".

== Listicles ==
=== Year-end lists ===
Critics' rankings for Ice Slippin
Publication	Accolade	Rank	Ref.
Billboard	The 25 Best Pride Songs of 2023: Staff Picks	Unranked	
i-D	The 100 best songs of 2023	95	
Out	30 Best Songs by LGBTQ+ Artists of 2023	16	
Them	Our 23 Favorite Songs by LGBTQ+ Artists in 2023	Unranked	
Time	The Best Latin Songs and Albums of 2023	Unranked	
