= Piper De Palma =

American actress

- Born: October 21, 1996 (age 30)
- Occupations: Actress; film director
- Known for: Spiral Farm
- Father: Brian De Palma
- Relatives: Willa Holland (half-sister)

Piper De Palma (born October 21, 1996) is an American actress. She is known for The Daphne Project and her breakout role in Spiral Farm. De Palma is the youngest daughter of film director Brian De Palma.

== Career ==
De Palma's first acting role was in the short film Ride or Die (2015) with first-time director Alec Tibaldi and co-director Magaajyia Silberfeld. Tibaldi and De Palma followed this up with the short film After School (2016).

This collaboration lead to De Palma's feature debut as the lead in Spiral Farm. Tibaldi wrote the role specifically for De Palma and said she was "influential in creating this character". In 2021, she appeared in Tibaldi's film The Daphne Project.

De Palma is directing her debut feature titled Jane's Bachelorette Weekend.

== Personal life ==
She is the youngest daughter of Brian De Palma and grew up with her half sisters actress Willa and Brianna Holland.

== Filmography ==
- Jane's Bachelorette Weekend, feature - 2027
- The Alibi, Short - 2023
- Wrong Planet, Short - 2023
- The Daphne Project, feature - 2021
- Spiral Farm, feature - 2019
- After School, Short - 2016
- Ride or Die, Short - 2015
