= 3 Boys =

Single by Omar Apollo
- Released: February 16, 2023
- Length: 3:29
- Label: Warner
- Songwriters: Omar Apollo; Mustafa Ahmed; Nathan Phillips; Dylan Wiggins
- Producer: Dylan Wiggins

Omar Apollo singles chronology
"Evergreen" (2022)	"3 Boys" (2023)	"Ice Slippin" (2023)

"3 Boys" is a song by American singer-songwriter Omar Apollo. It was released on 16 February 2023 through Warner Records. It lyrically speaks of the protagonist accepting his partner's suggestion of a ménage à trois only to find out it will not work out, describing polyamory as resentments waiting to happen. "3 Boys" was included on the soundtrack of the 2023 queer romantic comedy film Red, White & Royal Blue.

== Background ==
"3 Boys" was Apollo's first song of 2023 after releasing his debut studio album, Ivory, a year prior. A week before the song's release, Apollo posted a snippet of the song on his social media with the cover and the title. He explains, 'When I first started writing songs I would often write about unrequited love. "3 Boys" was my first time writing about something non-monogamous. I wrote the song on a rainy day in London...with a friend of mine, Dylan Wiggins. I also had my friend Mustafa help me with a few lines after I played it for him.'

== Critical reception ==
Jon Blistein of Rolling Stone wrote, 'the real draw is Apollo's vocals and his torn-up lyrics, Three boys would work if I wasn't so tethered to you.' Uproxx simply described it as 'a smooth, hypnotic beat' while specifying the chorus. BroadwayWorld stated, 'The simple, romantic melody is weaved with complex vocals that give every verse a different feel while staying true to his sound.' Fault Magazine referred to the song as 'A reflection of the artist's growth and authenticity.'

== Accolades ==
=== Year-end lists ===
Critics' rankings for 3 Boys
Publication	Accolade	Rank	Ref.
Coup De Main	The Best Songs of 2023	7	
NME	The 50 Best Songs of 2023	43	
Rolling Stone	The 100 Best Songs of 2023	29	

=== Mid-year lists ===
Critics' rankings for 3 Boys
Publication	Accolade	Rank	Ref.
Billboard	The 25 Best Pride Songs of 2023 (So Far): Staff Picks	Unranked	
Esquire	The Best Sad Songs of 2023 (So Far)	7	
Out	The 20 Best Songs of 2023 From LGBTQ+ Artists (So Far)	13	
Rolling Stone	The Best Songs of 2023 So Far	Unranked	

== Charts ==
Chart performance for "3 Boys"
Chart (2023)	Peak position
New Zealand Hot Singles (RMNZ)	36
US Hot Rock & Alternative Songs (Billboard)	27
