= Go Away (Omar Apollo song) =

2021 single by Omar Apollo

Single by Omar Apollo

from the album Ivory
- Released: July 8, 2021
- Recorded: 2021
- Genre: Alternative pop
- Length: 3:27
- Label: Warner
- Songwriter: Omar Apollo
- Producers: Omar Apollo; Carter Lang; Chromeo

Omar Apollo singles chronology
"Want U Around" (2020)	"Go Away" (2021)	"Bad Life" (2021)

Music video
- "Go Away" on YouTube

"Go Away" is a song by American singer Omar Apollo from his debut studio album Ivory (2022). It was released in the United States on July 8, 2021. "Go Away" details the narrator pleading with his lover not to leave him and dreading to say goodbye. The song was written by Apollo and co-produced with Carter Lang and Chromeo.

== Composition ==
"Go Away" is described as consisting of wavy, synth-filled instrumental and nostalgic sentimentality with hypnotic and washed-out guitars alongside vocal layering and punchy alt-pop percussion. It was written by Apollo. He co-produced the single with Carter Lang and Chromeo.

== Critical reception ==
"Go Away" received generally positive reviews from music critics. Jon Blistein of Rolling Stone wrote that it has "slick groove and [is] fleshed out with gauzy synths and stray guitar lines". Study Breaks called it "soulful and compelling", elaborating, "the chorus exudes desperation while appealing to the ears. The song is at once a catchy dance track, a heartfelt lament over a lover's departure, and wholly compelling." Thomas Bleach described it as a "smooth and captivating RNB-pop track", continuing, "It has a freeing and authentic energy embedded into the production that still feels organic and warm. His soothing and beautiful vocals simmer over the top and immediately have you drawn in and captivated by every word he sings." Liv Rose from Gig Goer stated, "It's a funky bedroom soul jam with striking high notes and dreamily exquisite harmonies, Go Away stuns with its unfiltered, romantic lyricism."

== Music video ==
A music video to accompany the release of the song was first distributed on YouTube on July 8, directed by Jenna Marsh. The video shows Apollo exploring the elements of nature. From touching the plants of a greenhouse and feeling the warmth of a nightfire to dipping his toes in a lake. The video continues with a closeup of Apollo smelling an Orange Lily which historically has the meaning of hatred and the shot cuts to Apollo curled up in a fetal position in the middle of the petals, that could imply self-hatred as the result of abandonment by the lover. The video concludes with Apollo standing in front of his love interest before his disappearance.

== Live performances ==
Apollo debuted the song live as the musical guest on The Tonight Show.
