= Apolonio =

2020 mixtape by Omar Apollo

Mixtape by Omar Apollo
- Released: October 16, 2020
- Length: 25:58
- Language: English; Spanish
- Label: AWAL
- Producer: Blake Slatkin; Michael Uzowuru; Omar Velasco; Teo Halm; Budgie; Mk.gee; Edgar Rodriguez; Albert Hammond Jr.; Oscar Santander; DJ Dahi

Omar Apollo chronology
Friends (2019)	Apolonio (2020)	Ivory (2022)

Singles from Ivory
- 1. "Stayback" Released: August 7, 2020; 2. "Kamikaze" Released: September 10, 2020; 3. "Dos Uno Nueve (219)" Released: September 28, 2020; 4. "Want U Around" Released: October 12, 2020

Apolonio is the debut mixtape by American singer-songwriter Omar Apollo. It was released on October 16, 2020, through AWAL.

Professional ratings
Review scores
Source	Rating
Clash	8/10
DIY	4/5 stars
NME	4/5 stars
Pitchfork	7.2/10

== Track listing ==
Apolonio track listing
No.	Title	Writer(s)	Producer(s)	Length
1.	"I'm Amazing"	Blake Slatkin; Michael Uzowuru; Omar Velasco	Slatkin; Uzowuru	2:23
2.	"Kamikaze"	Teo Halm; Velasco	Halm; Velasco	3:30
3.	"Want U Around" (featuring Ruel)	Velasco; Ruel van Dijk	Velasco	4:07
4.	"Stayback"	Velasco	Velasco	2:39
5.	"Hey Boy" (featuring Kali Uchis)	Kali Uchis; Velasco	Budgie; Mk.gee; Velasco	1:42
6.	"Dos Uno Nueve (219)"	Isidro Heredia; Velasco; Ruben Rodriguez	Edgar Rodriguez; Velasco	3:07
7.	"Useless"	Velasco	Albert Hammond Jr.; Mk.gee; Velasco; Oscar Santander	3:03
8.	"Bi Fren"	Uzowuru; Velasco	DJ Dahi; Uzowuru	2:51
9.	"The Two of Us"	Velasco	Velasco; Santander	2:32
Total length:				25:58

== Charts ==
Weekly chart performance for Apolonio
Chart (2020)	Peak position
US Heatseekers Albums (Billboard)	12
