= God Said No =

Studio album by Omar Apollo
- Released: June 28, 2024
- Studios: Abbey Road, London, UK
- Length: 45:12
- Languages: English; Spanish
- Label: Warner
- Producers: Omar Apollo; Teo Halm; Mike Hector; Carter Lang; Oscar Santander; Blake Slatkin; Dylan Wiggins

Omar Apollo chronology
Live for Me (2023)	God Said No (2024)

Singles from God Said No
- 1. "Spite" Released: April 5, 2024; 2. "Dispose of Me" Released: May 16, 2024; 3. "Less of You" Released: June 7, 2024

God Said No is the second studio album by American singer Omar Apollo, released on June 28, 2024, through Warner Records. It includes contributions from Mustafa and actor Pedro Pascal, and was preceded by the singles "Spite", "Dispose of Me" and "Less of You".

== Background and recording ==
God Said No was partially recorded at Abbey Road Studios in London, and produced alongside Teo Halm, Carter Lang and Blake Slatkin.

Apollo stated that the album is a "reflection of [his] life for the past 2 years" and "doesn't feel like it's a bunch of songs put together", calling it "a sequence that is made to be listened to front to back". It was called a "survey of the emotional wreckage that followed the end of a torrid love affair" in a press release. Apollo titled the album after a remark of his own when the relationship ended, which is also intended as a play on the Spanish phrase "lo que será, será" (English for "whatever will be, will be").

== Critical reception ==
Professional ratings
Aggregate scores
Source	Rating
Metacritic	82/100
Review scores
Source	Rating
AllMusic	4/5 stars
Clash	8/10
DIY	4/5 stars
Dork	4/5 stars
NME	4/5 stars
Pitchfork	7.4/10
Rolling Stone	4/5 stars

God Said No was met with critical acclaim upon release, receiving a score of 82 out of 100 on review aggregator Metacritic. Larisha Paul of Rolling Stone praised the album as being "an emotionally harrowing look inside the psyche of a musician wringing every drop of meaning from the old adage that great art comes from great pain".

NME reviewer Laura Molloy described the album as "Apollo's most atmospheric offering to date" and praised the "eclectic, expansive sonic palette that constantly drifts between genres yet is anchored in his diaristic musings on finite romance". In The New York Times, God Said No was selected as a NYT Critic's Pick. Reviewer Jon Pareles praised the "enduring break-up songs". He noted that the lo-fi tone of the album "suggests troubled thoughts and uncomfortable conversations, small-scale and introspective—seemingly private, not overtly theatrical".

=== Accolades ===
Critics' rankings for God Said No
Publication	Accolade	Rank	Ref.
Out	The top 10 albums released by LGBTQ+ artists in 2024	10	
Rolling Stone	The 100 Best Albums of 2024	59	
Variety	The Best Albums of 2024	Unranked	
Vogue	The 36 Best Albums of 2024	Unranked	

== Tour ==
The album was supported by the God Said No World Tour, which included dates in the United States, Canada, Japan, Indonesia and Australia. The tour began in Melbourne, Australia at the Festival Hall on July 15, 2024, and concluded in San Diego, California at the Rady Shell at Jacobs Park on October 11, 2024.

== Commercial performance ==
God Said No debuted at number 56 on the US Billboard 200 and number 14 on the Top Rock & Alternative Albums chart with 10,000 pure album sales.

== Track listing ==
God Said No track listing
No.	Title	Lyrics	Music	Producer(s)	Length
1.	"Be Careful with Me"	Omar Velasco; Billy Walsh	Teo Halm; Carter Lang; Blake Slatkin	Slatkin; Lang; Halm	3:16
2.	"Spite"	Velasco	Velasco; Halm; Slatkin	Slatkin; Halm	2:39
3.	"Less of You"	Velasco	Velasco; Halm	Omar Apollo; Halm	3:13
4.	"Done with You"	Velasco	Velasco; Halm; Lang; Slatkin; Dylan Wiggins	Slatkin; Lang; Wiggins; Apollo; Halm; Scott Bridgeway^{[a]}	2:38
5.	"Plane Trees" (featuring Mustafa)	Velasco; Mustafa Ahmed	Velasco; Halm	Apollo; Halm	3:31
6.	"Drifting"	Velasco	Velasco; Halm	Halm	4:23
7.	"Empty"	Velasco	Velasco; Halm; Slatkin	Slatkin; Apollo; Halm; Mark Kraus^{[a]}	3:17
8.	"Life's Unfair"	Velasco	Velasco; Halm	Halm; Kraus^{[a]}	2:58
9.	"Against Me"	Velasco	Velasco; Halm; Mike Hector	Hector; Apollo; Halm; Adam Krevlin^{[a]}	2:31
10.	"While U Can"	Velasco	Velasco; Lang; Oscar Santander	Lang; Apollo; Santander	3:06
11.	"Dispose of Me"	Velasco; Walsh	Halm; Santander; Slatkin	Slatkin; Santander; Halm	3:37
12.	"How"	Velasco	Velasco; Halm; Slatkin	Slatkin; Apollo; Halm	2:59
13.	"Pedro"	Velasco; Pedro Pascal	Velasco; Halm	Apollo; Halm	2:26
14.	"Glow"	Velasco	Velasco; Halm	Apollo; Halm	4:38
Total length:					45:12

Note

- ^{^[a]} signifies an additional producer

== Charts ==
Chart performance for God Said No
Chart (2024)	Peak position
Australian Albums (ARIA)	11
US Billboard 200	56
US Top Rock & Alternative Albums (Billboard)	14

== Personnel ==
- Omar Apollo – vocals (all tracks), Prophet synthesizer (track 9), celeste piano (13)
- Teo Halm – background vocals (tracks 1, 3, 4, 6, 7, 13), synthesizer (1, 3, 5, 6, 8), drum programming (1, 12), piano (1, 13), programming (2–4, 6, 8, 14), guitar (2, 4, 5, 14), bass (2, 4, 11, 14), drums (2, 4, 11), Juno synthesizer (2, 5, 12), percussion (2, 11); Oberheim synthesizer, Roland paraphonic keyboards (3); Mellotron (4), grand piano (5, 14), Prophet synthesizer (6, 9), Wurlitzer (7, 13), upright piano (7), synthesizer programming (12); celeste piano, horns, mixing (13); organ, Minimoog, string arrangement (14)
- Carter Lang – bass, synthesizer (track 1); engineering (track 4); EMS synthesizer (10)
- Blake Slatkin – guitar, programming (tracks 2, 4); synthesizer, Wurlitzer (2); drum programming, synthesizer programming (12); engineering (tracks 2, 4, 11, 12)
- Jonah Abraham – Oberheim synthesizer (track 3)
- Mike Sabath – synth bass (track 3)
- Rob Moose – cello, viola, violin, string arrangement (tracks 4, 5, 7, 14); engineering (tracks 4, 7, 14)
- Jake Hicks – background vocals (track 4)
- Christos Stylianides – flugelhorn, lead trumpet (track 4)
- Kenneth Brown II – flugelhorn, trumpet (track 4)
- Scott Bridgeway – drum programming (track 4)
- Dylan Wiggins – guitar (track 4)
- John Mayer – guitar (track 4)
- Michael Underwood – saxophone (track 4)
- Mustafa – vocals, background vocals (track 5)
- Mark Kraus – engineering (tracks 1, 3, 11, 13), engineering assistance (4, 6, 7, 10); synthesizer programming (track 7), synthesizer (8)
- BlankFor.ms – loops and engineering (tracks 7, 14)
- Adam Krevlin – Casio keyboards (track 9)
- Mike Hector – drum programming (track 9)
- Oscar Santander – guitar (tracks 10, 11), Minimoog (14)
- Dylan Day – guitar, slide guitar (track 11)
- Mason Stoops – guitar, slide guitar (track 11)
- Sean Hurley – bass (track 11)
- Pedro Pascal – vocals (track 13)
- Dale Becker – mastering (tracks 1, 3–14)
- Mike Bozzi – mastering (track 2)
- Joe Visciano – mixing (tracks 1, 9, 10)
- Serban Ghenea – mixing (tracks 2, 4)
- Jon Castelli – mixing (tracks 3, 5–7, 11, 12, 14)
- Manny Marroquin – mixing (track 8)
- John Muller – engineering (tracks 1, 4–10, 14)
- Darren Jones – engineering (tracks 2–5, 8, 13, 14)
- Garry Purohit – engineering (tracks 8, 14)
- Nathan Phillips – engineering (tracks 9, 10)
- Paul Pritchard – engineering (track 13)
- Bryce Bordone – mix engineering (tracks 2, 4)
- Brad Lauchert – mix engineering (tracks 3, 5–7, 11, 12, 14)
- Ben Parkka – engineering assistance (tracks 1, 4, 6, 7), sound design (7)
- Jamie Sprosen – engineering assistance (tracks 2, 3, 5, 13, 14)
- Claude Vause – engineering assistance (tracks 3, 4)
- Stephanie DeAngelis – engineering assistance (track 3)
- Dani Perez – engineering assistance (tracks 5, 14)
- Annie Gasiorowski – engineering assistance (track 13)
