= Spiral Farm =

- Directed by: Alec Tibaldi
- Written by: Alec Tibaldi; Thomai Hastios
- Produced by: Michael Hoopingarner; Nikil Shyam Sunder; Alec Tibaldi; Madeleine Tibaldi
- Starring: Piper De Palma; Amanda Plummer; Cosimo Fusco; Jade Fusco
- Cinematography: Scott Ray
- Edited by: Veronica Pinkham; Diana Tay
- Music by: Amedeo Ursini
- Production companies: Mailuki Films; SFP
- Distributed by: Indican Pictures
- Release dates: January 26, 2019 (Slamdance Film Festival); December 13, 2019 (United States)
- Running time: 85 minutes
- Country: United States
- Language: English

Spiral Farm is a 2019 American drama film directed by Alec Tibaldi, starring Piper De Palma, Amanda Plummer, Cosimo Fusco and Jade Fusco.

== Cast ==
- Piper De Palma as Anahita
- Amanda Plummer as Dianic
- Cosimo Fusco as Maurizio
- Teo Halm as Theo
- Jade Fusco as Dianic
- Sara Anne as Miracle
- Landen Beattie as Ocean

== Release ==
The film premiered at the Slamdance Film Festival on 26 January 2019. and had its European Premiere at the Taormina Film Fest in July 2019 where it won the Best First Film Award. Indican Pictures acquired the film and released it select theaters and VOD on December 13, 2019.

== Reception ==
Paul Parcellin of Film Threat gave the film a score of 8/10. Makenna Sutter-Robinson of SLUG Magazine wrote that the film "has the ability to haunt you with its relevance and leave you in amazement with its nuanced imagery and simple, unexpected beauty."

Noel Murray of the Los Angeles Times wrote that "Not much happens in “Spiral Farm,” but what does is often heartbreaking."
