= Friends (Omar Apollo EP) =

EP by Omar Apollo
- Released: April 10, 2019
- Length: 22:37
- Label: Omar Apollo; AWAL
- Producer: Omar Apollo; Blake Slatkin; John Shanks; Oscar Santander; Teo Halm

Omar Apollo chronology
Stereo (EP) (2018)	Friends (2019)	Apolonio (2020)

Singles from Friends
- 1. "Trouble" Released: January 30, 2019; 2. "Ashamed" Released: February 27, 2019; 3. "So Good" Released: May 16, 2019

Friends is the second EP by American singer-songwriter Omar Apollo. It was released independently on April 10, 2019, preceded by the singles "Trouble" and "Ashamed" .

== Background ==
On March 4, 2019, AWAL Recordings announced in a press release that Omar Apollo had joined their roster. This deal would serve to give him radio promotion, help him breach international markets and distribution of his music.

In an interview with DJBooth.net, Omar Apollo revealed that his upcoming EP would be more funk-oriented, with "space-y" sounds, including ballads, and having a more themed sound compared to his debut Stereo.

== Singles and music videos ==
On January 30, 2019, Omar released Trouble across all music platforms. He announced that it would be the lead single for his 2nd EP, the next body of work since his debut EP Stereo. The same day, Apollo also released a music video for the song which features his nephew alongside him, the video details Omar's decisions viewed through his nephew's eyes.

Ashamed was released as the second single on February 27, 2019. It is described as a mainly funk and R&B track which he produced with Blake Slatkin. The accompanying music and lyric video starred him recording a day out with his friends.

In the week anticipating the EP release, Omar Apollo released the title track Friends as a promotional single.

A music video for the disco inspired track So Good was released May 16, 2019. Apollo is seen performing in a retro-inspired set.

The final music video for the era was for the song Kickback which premiered on October 1, 2019. This video features Omar partying with friends on a yacht living a dream. At the end of the video he is seen being struck by lightning.

== Tour ==
On March 9, 2019, Omar Apollo embarked on the Voyager Tour in support of the EP which spanned 34 dates across the United States and Canada. The tour included festival dates at SXSW. The opening acts were Role Model, Dreamer Boy, Mk.gee and Ambar Lucid.

== Track listing ==
Friends track listing
No.	Title	Writer(s)	Producer(s)	Length
1.	"Ashamed"	Omar Velasco; John Shanks; Blake Slatkin	Apollo; Shanks; Blake	3:24
2.	"Kickback"	Velasco	Apollo; Oscar Santander	2:51
3.	"Friends"	Shanks; Apollo	Apollo; Shanks	3:07
4.	"There For Me (Interlude)"	Slatkin; Velasco	Apollo; Blake	1:23
5.	"Hearing Your Voice"	Shanks; Apollo	Apollo; Shanks	4:02
6.	"So Good"	Shanks; Velasco	Apollo; Shanks; Blake	4:27
7.	"Trouble"	Slatkin; Velasco	Apollo; Blake; Teo Halm	3:23
Total length:				22:37

== Charts ==
Weekly chart performance for Friends
Chart (2019)	Peak position
US Heatseekers Albums (Billboard)	19
