= Invincible (Omar Apollo song) =

2022 single by Omar Apollo

Single by Omar Apollo featuring Daniel Caesar

from the album Ivory
- Released: February 9, 2022
- Genre: Neo soul
- Length: 3:36
- Label: Warner
- Songwriters: Omar Apollo; Sean Leon; Daniel Caesar
- Producers: Apollo; Caesar

Omar Apollo singles chronology
"Bad Life" (2021)	"Invincible" (2022)	"Killing Me" (2022)

Daniel Caesar singles chronology
"Peaches" (2021)	"Invincible" (2022)

Lyric video
- "Invincible" on YouTube

"Invincible" is a song by American singer Omar Apollo, featuring Daniel Caesar, from his debut studio album Ivory (2022). It was released through Warner Records as the album's third single on February 9, 2022.

== Composition ==
Apollo co-wrote and co-produced the song with Caesar with Sean Leon providing additional writing.

"Invincible" is a future-leaning neo soul ballad driven by guitar and drum production. The song incorporates different genre elements such as drum and bass, alternative R&B, and reggae.

The song has lyrics focusing on themes such as human fragility, mortality, queer love, and melancholy.

== Music video ==
The music video for "Invincible" was directed by Stillz and released on February 9, 2022.

The video begins with Apollo plugging in an amplifier, which he is then sitting on while strumming a guitar in the middle of an alleyway. Alongside him is Caesar and two young boys racing with toy cars, an SUV and an ambulance. The scene transition to Caesar riding out the top of an SUV in which seems to be a car chase between the vehicles the young boys were playing with. Apollo is riding passenger-side behind the ambulance, which is then shown to have Caesar inside of it attached to IVs. The ambulance arrives to a house where Caesar is being pulled out on a stretcher and placed onto a dinner table with a cake on top of him, where a family celebrating a birthday and blowing out candles. In between, there are scenes depicting Caesar being prepared for surgery. During Apollo's verse, he is seen getting an MRI in a garage. After Apollo finishes his rap verse, a shirtless male couple wearing large puppet heads are hanging out. The two men are seen running, holding hands, wrestling on the ground, and embracing each other. The video ends with Apollo and Caesar exiting the alleyway into a tunnel.

The puppet heads that the gay couple are wearing were created by Andrés Gudiño, a Costa Rican artist whose visuals depict sexuality and gender. The video won the Best International R&B/Soul Video award at the 2022 UK Music Video Awards.

== Critical reception ==
"Invincible" was acclaimed by critics. Writers at Billboard, appreciated the song for exploring different genres, calling it a "musical match made in heaven". Cora Johnson of Clash Music gave the song a positive review, calling it "hypnotic" and "beautifully arranged with "symphonic" harmonies layered throughout the track. K.G. of NME praised the song's stripped-down production as it "allowed Apollo's and Caesar's vocal performances to shine." In a review of the song's parent album, NME also called the track “emotionally climactic” and "tender" collaboration.

== Accolades ==
Award nominations for "Invincible"
Year	Ceremony	Award	Result	Ref.
2022	UK Music Video Awards	Best R&B/Soul Video - International	Won	
