= Teo Halm =

American record producer, songwriter, and actor

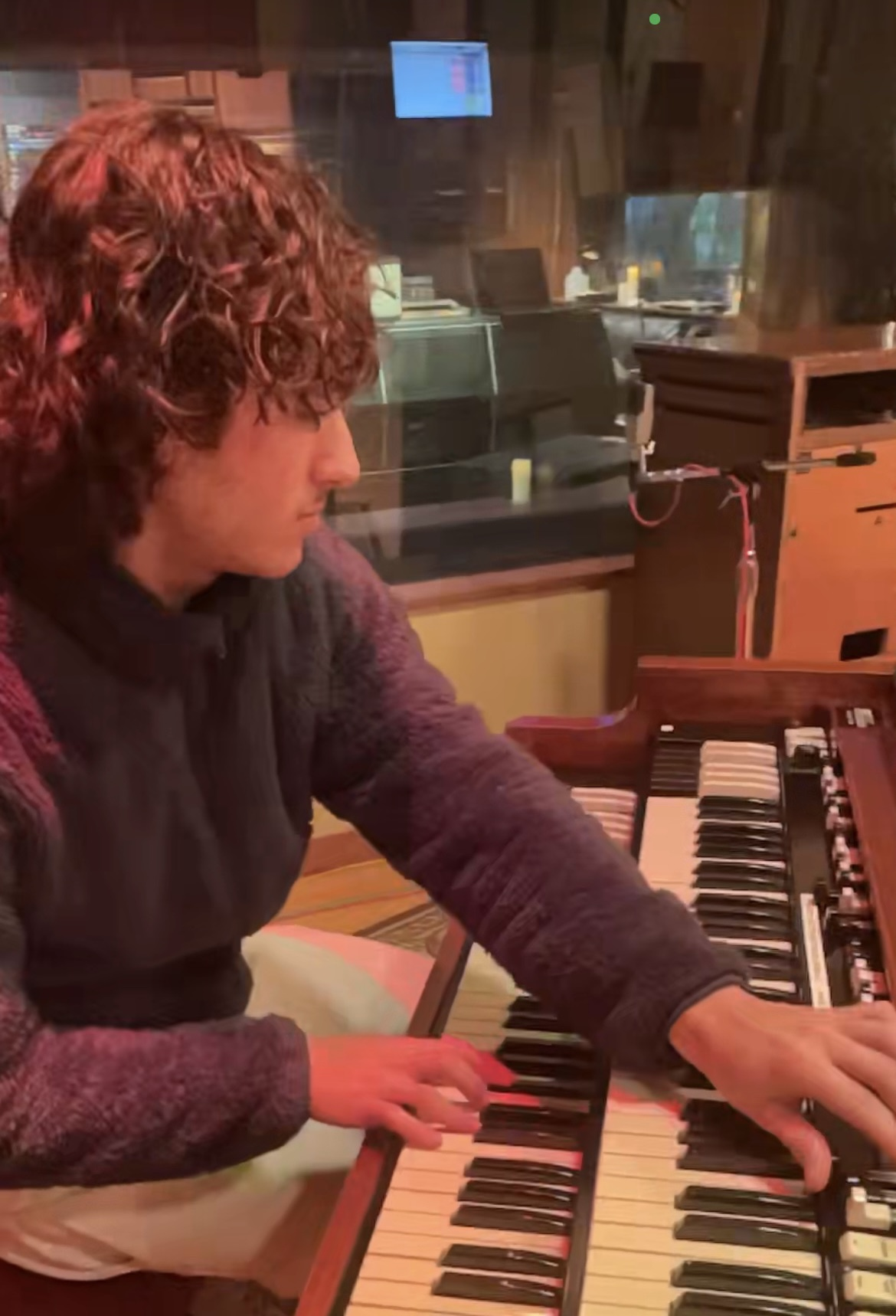

Background information
- Born: May 18, 1999 (age 27); Los Angeles, California, U.S.
- Occupations: Record producer; songwriter; singer; actor
- Years active: 2009–present
- Label: UMPG

Teo Lucas Halm (born May 18, 1999) is an American record producer, songwriter, singer, and actor based in Los Angeles. As a producer and songwriter, he has contributed to projects, including SZA's acclaimed album SOS, Rosalía's singles "Con Altura" and "TKN," and Beyoncé's The Lion King: The Gift. He also co-wrote and co-produced "Evergreen (You Didn't Deserve Me at All)" by Omar Apollo and multiple tracks on Baby Keem's album Ca$ino, which debuted at number four on the Billboard 200. His credited work spans commercial successful singles, albums, and soundtracks, collectively exceeding five billion streams worldwide. As an actor, Halm is best known for starring in the 2014 film Earth to Echo.

== Early life and acting career ==
Teo Halm was born in Los Angeles, California. His mother's family is from France and Morocco and his father is Australian, of British and Czech descent.

Halm grew up performing in theater, performing in productions of The Sound of Music and The Music Man. Some of his first professional credits included a 2009 episode of the PBS series Nova and an UCLA alumni fundraising campaign. In the following years he appeared in a few short films. He was cast in a supporting role in the James Franco-directed Bukowski, an independent film adaption of Ham on Rye; the film was produced in early 2013 but was not distributed due to a copyright issue. Also in 2013, Halm was cast in the pilot of the Disney Channel Boy Meets World follow-up series Girl Meets World as Elliot, the son of Cory and Topanga; his character was ultimately cut from the series after the pilot was shot.

Halm had his most prominent film role in the 2014 sci-fi fantasy film Earth to Echo, for which he received top billing. The film premiered at the LA Film Festival and was released in theaters in July 2014. For his role as Alex, Halm received the Best Actor Award at the ninth annual PICK Awards. As a teenager, he had a supporting lead role in the movie Memoria, which premiered at the Austin Film Festival in 2015 and distributed in North America in 2016, and the film Camp starring Joey King and Nolan Gould. In 2018, Halm played the role of Theo in the independent feature film Spiral Farm; it premiered at Slamdance Film Festival in January 2019 during which it was nominated for Best Narrative Feature.

== Transition to music ==
Since 2016, Halm has worked as a record producer and songwriter, and often collaborates with producers Michael Uzowuru, Frank Dukes, Mark Ronson, Carter Lang and Blake Slatkin. In 2019, he was named to Billboard's 21 Under 21 list of songwriters and producers, having co-written the Latin Grammy-winning song "Con Altura" by Rosalia (featuring J Balvin) and co-writing and co-producing "Mood 4 Eva" by Beyoncé, Jay-Z and Childish Gambino, from the Grammy-nominated album The Lion King: The Gift.

== Songwriting and production career ==
In 2021, "Mountains", performed by Charlotte Day Wilson and co-written by Halm, was sampled in the track "Fair Trade" by Drake featuring Travis Scott from the album Certified Lover Boy. At the 2022 Juno Awards, Teo was nominated as a co-writer with Charlotte Day Wilson as Songwriter of the Year for "I Can Only Whisper." Omar Apollo's Evergreen (You Didn't Deserve Me at All) co-written and produced by Halm reached number 51 on Billboard Hot 100 after going viral on TikTok. Rolling Stone ranked it at number 29 on the 100 Best Songs of 2022.

At the Latin Grammy Awards of 2022, Teo as a writer/producer of four songs on the Rosalia album Motomami won a Latin Grammy for Album of the Year and also best Alternative Music Album. At the 2023 Grammy Awards Motomami won Best Latin Rock or Alternative Album. Halm co-wrote and produced two songs on the SZA album SOS, Notice Me and Open Arms (with Travis Scott). The album debuted at number one on the US Billboard 200 chart and stayed there for ten consecutive weeks, becoming the biggest streaming R&B album of the decade.

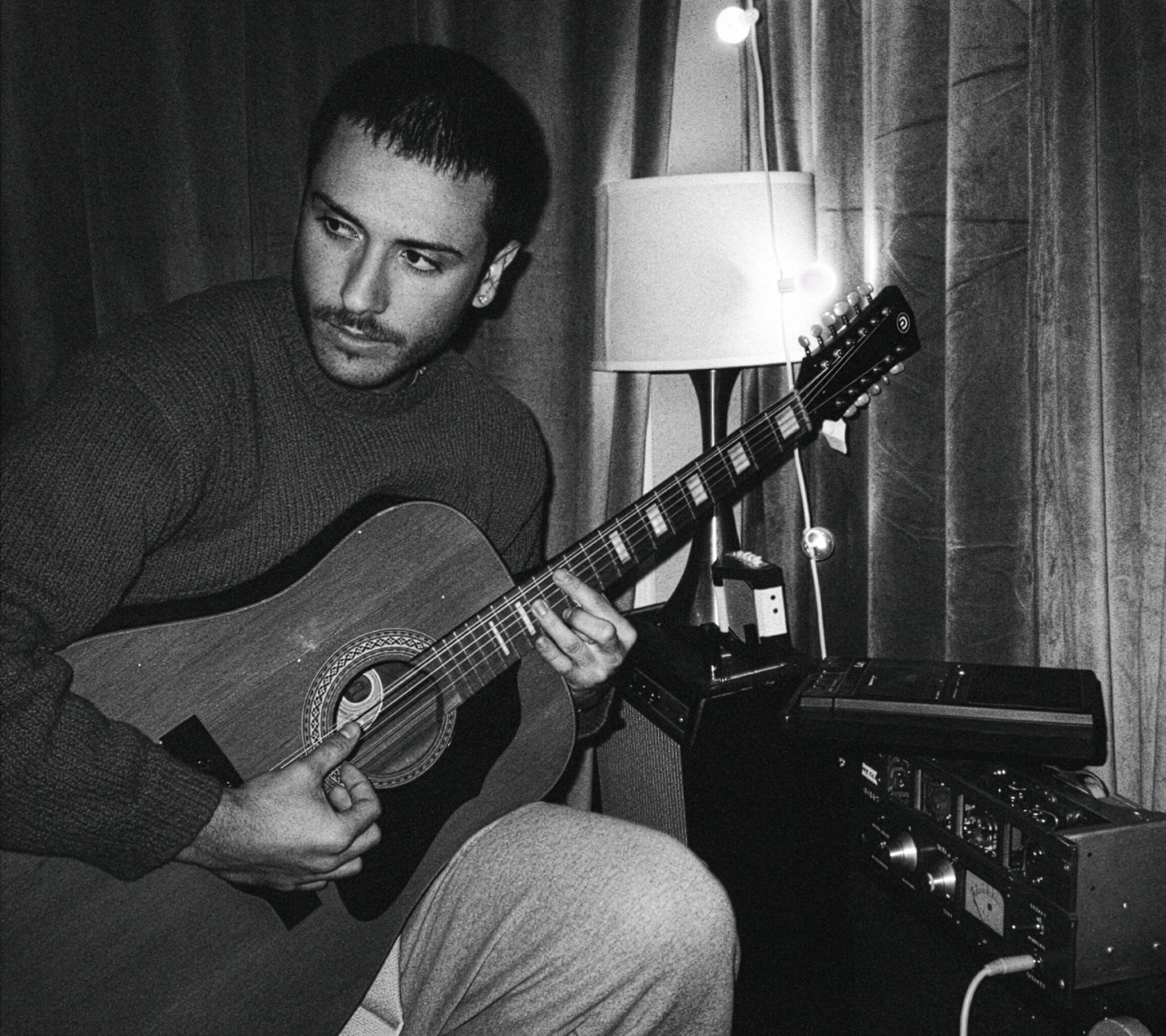
Teo Halm playing acoustic guitar during a recording session at Pinky Studios

== Collaborations and partnerships ==
Halm has developed recurring creative collaborations with several artists, including Omar Apollo, Rex Orange County, Rosalía, SZA, Charlotte Day Wilson, and Choker, contributing to multiple tracks across their respective releases.

In May 2024, Omar Apollo announced the June 28 release of his second studio album, God Said No, which was recorded in London's legendary Abbey Road Studios with executive producer Teo Halm. In September 2024 Rex Orange County released his long-awaited fifth studio album The Alexander Technique with six tracks co-written and produced by his friend Halm.

In 2026, ‘Have A Baby (With Me)’ by Daniel Caesar, which Halm co-wrote and co-produced, received a Juno nomination for Traditional R&B/Soul Recording of the Year. Halm was also credited as a co-songwriter on ‘Have A Baby (With Me),’ a song included in Mustafa’s Songwriter of the Year (Non-Performer) nominee submission. Halm co-wrote and co-produced five tracks on Baby Keem’s album Ca$ino, which debuted at number four on the Billboard 200 and at number one on the Top R&B/Hip-Hop Albums chart, marking the highest-charting album of Keem’s career. The album received generally positive reviews from critics.

== Professional affiliations ==
As a songwriter, he is signed to Universal Music Publishing Group, Electric Feel Publishing and BMI.

== Filmography ==
Film and television roles
Year	Title	Role	Notes
2009	Nova	Neanderthal boy	TV series; episode: "Becoming Human: Last Human Standing"
2012	Waltham Vanguard	Bud	Short film; CINE Golden Eagle winner
2013	Bukowski	Frank Sullivan	Unreleased
2014	15	Young Brother	Short film
2014	Girl Meets World	Elliot Matthews	Unaired pilot
2014	Earth to Echo	Alex	PICK Awards winner – Best Actor
2015	Lift	The Introvert	Short film
2015	Memoria	Alex (13 yrs)	
2019	Spiral Farm	Theo	Slamdance Premiere January 26, 2019
2024	Camp	Howard	Tubi Original movie set for release July 12, 2024

== Discography ==
=== Singles ===
- "Ukiyo" (2016)
- "Sweet" 2016
- "she doesn't even know my name" (2017)
- "scumbag demo" (2017)
- "GIIIRL" (2017)
- "Today" (2018)
- "Frankie Muniz wakes up to a perfect morning (2018)
- "outside orbit 124 1" (2018)
- "R3552 INTO THE SUN (2018)
- 3:4 Mystics 126.82 (2018)
- "Momma" (2018)
- "new days" (2020)
- "Sun On Me 147.13 Th" (2021)
- "Alright so now we in the thrashher tee [149.502 BPM]" (2022)
- "Winter 1 Th" (2022)
- "Dnb 2 166 Th" (2023)
- "Blueprint 2" (2024)
- "suite for a friend" (2024)
- "RAIN AMBIENCE 3 TH" (2024)
- "Outside" (2026) Freddie Gibbs & Teo Halm

== Production discography ==
=== Production and songwriting ===
Tracks credited as producer and songwriter, unless otherwise noted
Year	Artist(s)	Song	Album	Notes
2016	Kevin Abstract	"Tattoo"	American Boyfriend: A Suburban Love Story	Asst. production credit
2016	Kevin Abstract	"Yellow"	American Boyfriend: A Suburban Love Story	Asst. production credit, additional vocals
2016	Ezra Maeve, Teo Halm	"Ukiyo"	Lavender Hills	
2016	Raury	"Neveralone"	N/A	Also bass, drums
2018	¿Teo? featuring Jaden Smith	"Uno Dos"	¿Teo?	
2018	¿Teo?	"Unitedpalace (Interlude)"	¿Teo?	Producer only
2018	Amandla Stenberg	"Always"	The Hate U Give (OST)	
2018	Omar Apollo, Teo Halm	"Today"	Skate Kitchen (OST)	
2018	Quadry, Teo Halm	"Momma"	Malik Ruff	
2018	Choker	"Juno"	Honeybloom	
2019	Goldlink, Khalid	"Days Like This"	Diaspora	
2019	Kelsey Lu	"I'm Not in Love"	Blood	Also engineer
2019	Rosalía & J Balvin	"Con Altura"	N/A	
2019	070 Shake & Jessie Reyez	"Scar"	The Lion King: The Gift	
2019	Beyoncé, Jay-Z & Childish Gambino	"Mood 4 Eva"	The Lion King: The Gift	Misc. production credit
2019	King Princess featuring Tobias Jesso Jr.	"Isabel's Moment"	Cheap Queen	Also engineer, piano
2019	Choker	"Lucky"	Forever & A Few	
2019	Choker	"Guppy"	Forever & A Few	
2019	Choker	"Guava Tea"	Forever & A Few	
2019	Charlotte Day Wilson	"Mountains"	Alpha	Also guitar
2019	UMI	"Love Affair"	Love Language	Also bass guitar
2019	Omar Apollo	"Trouble"	Friends (Omar Apollo EP)	
2019	Vegyn	"Fire Like Tyndall"	Only Diamonds Cut Diamonds	Songwriting credit only
2019	Vegyn	"I Don't Owe U NYthing"	Only Diamonds Cut Diamonds	Songwriting credit only
2020	Rosalía & Travis Scott	"TKN"	N/A	
2020	IDK featuring Juicy J	"Square Up"	IDK & FRIENDS 2	
2020	Kaash Paige	"FRIENDS"	Teenage Fever	
2020	Troye Sivan	"could cry just thinking about you"	In A Dream	
2020	Anne-Marie featuring Doja Cat	"To Be Young"	Therapy	Also bass, drums, piano, programming, synthesizer
2020	Omar Apollo	"Kamikaze"	Apolonio	
2020	Bea Miller	"Self Crucify"	elated	
2020	Zack Villere	"Causeway"	N/A	
2020	Tierra Whack	"Dora"	TW2*	Co-producer credit, background vocals
2021	Charlotte Day Wilson feat.BadBadNotGood	"I Can Only Whisper"	Alpha	Songwriting credit only
2021	Swae Lee featuring Jhené Aiko	"In the Dark"	Shang-Chi and the Legend of the Ten Rings (Original Motion Picture Soundtrack)	
2021	Drake featuring Travis Scott	"Fair Trade (song)"	Certified Lover Boy	Composer and lyricist credits only
2021	Baby Keem	"trademark usa"	The Melodic Blue	
2021	Omar Apollo featuring Kali Uchis	"Bad Life"		Also guitar, bass, programming, synth
2021	HVN	"Hellscat"	All Girls Go To Heaven	
2022	FKA twigs	"Meta Angel"	Caprisongs	
2022	FKA twigs	"Pamplemousse"	Caprisongs	
2022	Rosalía	"La Combi Versace" (featuring Tokischa)	Motomami	Songwriting and Miscellaneous Producer
2022	Lous and the Yakuza	Kisé	LATY2*	Producer only
2022	Omar Apollo	"Evergreen"	Ivory	Also bass and programming
2022	Selah Sue	"Twice a Day"	Persona	Songwriting credit only
2022	Tanna Leone	"Death n’ Taxes"	Sleepy Soldier	
2022	Tanna Leone	"February"	Sleepy Soldier	Also drums, percussion, bass, guitar, keyboards
2022	Ravyn Lenae	"Inside Out"	Hypnos	Producer only
2022	Ravyn Lenae featuring Mereba	"Where I'm From"	Hypnos	Producer only
2022	Rex Orange County	"Threat"	N/A	Also guitar and bass
2022	Rosalía	"Aislamiento"	Motomami+	Songwriting credit only
2022	Rosalía	"La Kilié	Motomami+	
2022	Rosalía	"LAX"	Motomami+	
2022	Omar Apollo	"Saving All My Love"	Ivory (Marfil)	Producer only
2022	Kid Cudi	"Maybe So"	Entergalactic	
2022	Arima Ederra	"Portals"	Orange Colored Day	Producer only
2022	Arima Ederra	"Steel Wing"	Orange Colored Day	
2022	Arima Ederra	"Letters from the Imaginary"	Orange Colored Day	
2022	Arima Ederra	"Message"	Orange Colored Day	Producer only
2022	Arima Ederra	"Orange Colored Day"	Orange Colored Day	
2022	Arima Ederra	"Drugz/Wooden Wheel"	Orange Colored Day	Producer only
2022	Arima Ederra	"Fall for You"	Orange Colored Day	Songwriting credit only
2022	Arima Ederra	"Dual Skies"	Orange Colored Day	Producer only
2022	Arima Ederra	"Yellow Cabi"	Orange Colored Day	Producer only
2022	Mount Kimbie and Dom Maker	"dvd" (featuring Choker)	MK 3.5: Die Cuts | City Planning	Songwriting credit, drums and bass
2022	Kenny Beats	"Rotten"	Louie	Songwriting credit only
2022	Lous and the Yakuza	"Takata"	Iota	Producer only
2022	Lous and the Yakuza	"Monster"	Iota	Producer only
2022	Lous and the Yakuza	"Yuzu Balade"	Iota	Producer only
2022	SZA	"Notice Me"	SOS	
2022	SZA featuring Travis Scott	"Open Arms"	SOS	Also drums, guitar, keyboards
2022	Vegyn, Teo Halm, Michael Uzowuru	"Alright so now we in the thrashher tee [149.502 BPM]"	Don't Follow Me Because I'm Lost Too!!	
2023	Lil Yachty	"Drive Me Crazy!"	Let's Start Here	
2023	Julián Dysart	"Man Down"		
2023	Matt Cleare	"4000!"		
2023	Kirby (Ni'Jah)	"Agatha"	Swarm soundtrack	
2023	Amire Obè	"Blinded Interlude"	after.	
2023	Vagabon	"Do Your Worst"	Sorry I Haven’t Called	
2023	Omar Apollo	"Ice Slippin"	Live for Me	Also drums, guitar, synthesizer, programming
2023	Omar Apollo	"Pilot"	Live for Me	Also drums, bass, synthesizer
2023	Sampha	"Inclination Compass (Tenderness)"	Lahai	Producer only
2024	Yeat	"Never Quit"	2093 P2	
2024	Dominic Fike	"Coast2coast"	14 Minutes	
2024	Trueno	"Plo Plo!"	El Ultimo Baile	
2024	Omar Apollo	"Spite"	God Said No	Also drums, bass, guitar, synthesizer, Juno synthesizer, programming, percussion
2024	Omar Apollo	"Dispose of Me"	God Said No	Also bass, drums, percussion
2024	Omar Apollo	"Less of You"	God Said No	Also keyboards, synthesizer, background vocals, programming, Oberheim synthesizer, Roland paraphonic keyboards
2024	Omar Apollo	"Be Careful with Me"	God Said No	Also background vocals, synthesizer, drum programming, piano
2024	Omar Apollo	"Done with You"	God Said No	Also background vocals, programming, guitar, bass, drums, Mellotron
2024	Omar Apollo	"Plane Trees" (featuring Mustafa)	God Said No	Also synthesizer, guitar Juno synthesizer, grand piano
2024	Omar Apollo	"Drifting"	God Said No	Also background vocals, synthesizer, programming, Prophet synthesizer
2024	Omar Apollo	"Empty"	God Said No	Also background vocals, Wurlitzer, upright piano,
2024	Omar Apollo	"Life's Unfair"	God Said No	Also synthesizer, programming
2024	Omar Apollo	"Against Me"	God Said No	Also Prophet synthesizer
2024	Omar Apollo	"While U Can"	God Said No	
2024	Omar Apollo	"How"	God Said No	Also drum programming, Juno synthesizer, synthesizer programming
2024	Omar Apollo	"Pedro" (featuring Pedro Pascal)	God Said No	Also background vocals, piano,Wurlitzer, celeste piano, horns
2024	Omar Apollo	"Glow"	God Said No	Also programming, guitar, bass, grand piano, organ, Minimoog
2024	Bruteman	"And in the Night"		Also bass, guitar, synths, drums
2024	Rex Orange County	"Guitar Song"	The Alexander Technique	Also acoustic guitar, background vocal, bass guitar, drum machine, horn arrangement, programmer
2024	Rex Orange County	"The Table"	The Alexander Technique	Also synth, piano, programmer
2024	Rex Orange County	"2008"		Also electric guitar, drum programming
2024	Rex Orange County	"Therapy"		
2024	Rex Orange County	"Lost For Words"		Also acoustic guitar, electric guitar, mouth trumpet, drum programming
2024	Rex Orange County	"Finally"		Also sample chop, programming
2024	Pearl & The Oysters	"Halfway Where?	Planet Pearl	Songwriting credit only
2024	Pearl & The Oysters	"Big Time"	Planet Pearl	Songwriting credit only
2024	Pearl & The Oysters	"Mid City"	Planet Pearl	Songwriting credit only
2024	Halsey	"Dog Years"	"The Great Impersonator"	Additional production
2024	Sailorr	"W1LL U L13?"	FROM FLORIDA'S FINEST	
2024	Arima Ederra featuring Mereba	"Oh God"		Also guitar, congas, engineering
2024	Arima Ederra	"Really Tired"		Also Moog Model D, engineering
2024	Quadry	"The Ghost of BrandyWine"	Ask a Magnolia	
2024	Quadry	"I'm Wrong"	Ask a Magnolia	
2024	Quadry	"The Waterboy"	Ask a Magnolia	
2025	Sailorr	"GRRL’S GRRL"	FROM FLORIDA'S FINEST	
2025	Archie Madekwe	"Love and Obsession"	Lurker (Original Motion Picture Soundtrack)	Producer only
2025	Daniel Caesar	"Have a Baby (With Me)"	Son of Spergy	
2025	Jordan Ward	"JUICY"		
2026	Arima Ederra	"First Time"	A Rush To Nowhere	Also engineer, bass, guitar, programmer, synthesizer
2026	Arima Ederra	"Heard What You Said"	A Rush To Nowhere	Also engineer, background vocal, bass, drums, guitar, programmer, synthesizer
2026	Arima Ederra	"You're My"	A Rush To Nowhere	Also engineer, bass, guitar
2026	Arima Ederra	"In The Business of Feeling"	A Rush To Nowhere	Also engineering, bass, guitar, keyboards
2026	Arima Ederra	"In This Life"	A Rush To Nowhere	Also engineering, bass, drums, guitar, percussion, piano
2026	Arima Ederra	"I Wanna Know"	A Rush To Nowhere	Also engineering, background vocal, bass, programmer, syntheziser
2026	Arima Ederra	"Took The Long Way Home"	A Rush To Nowhere	Also engineer, clavinet, guitar
2026	Arima Ederra	"Gemini Eyes"	A Rush To Nowhere	Also engineer, bass, drums, guitar, synthesizer, trombone, trumpet
2026	Arima Ederra	"Second Time"	A Rush To Nowhere	Arranger and co-producer only
2026	Arima Ederra	"Heads or Tails"	A Rush To Nowhere	Also engineer, bass, guitar, piano, programmer, synthesizer
2026	Arima Ederra	"Shine"	A Rush To Nowhere	Also engineer, bass, guitar, synthesizer
2026	Arima Ederra	"Hope Is a Muscle"	A Rush To Nowhere	Also mixing engineer
2026	Arima Ederra	"Wrapped Inside Your Love"	A Rush To Nowhere	Also engineer, bass, guitar
2026	Arima Ederra	"Air & Everywehere"	A Rush To Nowhere	Arranger, bass, guitar only
2026	Arima Ederra	"Holding On"	A Rush To Nowhere	Also engineer, bass, drums, guitar
2026	Baby Keem	"Ca$ino"	Ca$ino	
2026	Baby Keem	"House Money"	Ca$ino	
2026	Baby Keem	"Circus Circus Free$tyle"	Ca$ino	
2026	Baby Keem featuring Kendrick Lamar and Momo Boyd	"Good Flirts"	Ca$ino	
2026	Baby Keem featuring Too $hort	"$ex Appeal"	Ca$ino	
	Amie Blu	"trees for the woods"		Also guitar
	Freddie Gibbs & Teo Halm	"Outside (Instrumental)"		
	Freddie Gibbs	"Outside"	You Only Die 1nce (deluxe)	

=== Other credits ===
- Score of Guava Island (2019); guitar, trombone, bass guitar
- Miley Cyrus – "Never Be Me" from Plastic Hearts (2020); keyboards
- Mustafa – "Stay Alive" from When Smoke Rises (2021); bass guitar
- Pearl & the Oysters – Flowerland (2021); engineer, guitar
- Bruteman – "That's Us" from Mosquito (2024); bass, drums

== Awards and nominations ==
Year	Award	Category	Nominated work	Result	Notes
2014	PICK Awards	Best Actor Award	Earth to Echo	Won	
2019	Latin Grammy Awards	Best Urban Song	"Con Altura" (Rosalía & J Balvin)	Won	Songwriter
2021	BMI Awards	Award Winning Song	"Con Altura" (Rosalía & J Balvin)	Won	Songwriter
2022	Juno Awards	Songwriter of the Year	"I Can Only Whisper" (Charlotte Day Wilson)	Nominated	Songwriter
2022	Latin Grammy Awards	Album of the Year	Motomami (Rosalía)	Won	Songwriter/producer 4 tracks
2022	Latin Grammy Awards	Best Alternative Music Album	Motomami (Rosalía)	Won	Songwriter/producer 4 tracks
2023	Grammy Awards	Best Latin Rock or Alternative Album	Motomami (Rosalía)	Won	Songwriter/producer 4 tracks
2023	Grammy Awards	Best Progressive R&B Album	SOS (SZA)	Won	Songwriter/producer 2 tracks
2026	Juno Awards	Songwriter of the Year (non-performer)	Mustafa	Nominated	Listed among the co-songwriters on a song included in the nominee’s submission
2026	Juno Awards	Traditional R&B/Soul Recording of the Year	"Have A Baby (With Me)" (Daniel Caesar)	Nominated	Halm co-wrote and co-produced
