= Tamagotchi (song) =

2022 single by Omar Apollo

Single by Omar Apollo

from the album Ivory
- Language: Spanish; English
- Released: March 23, 2022
- Recorded: 2021
- Genre: Latin trap; R&B
- Length: 2:48
- Label: Warner
- Songwriters: Maria Alejandra Osorio; Najai Washington; Omar Apollo; Chad Hugo; Pharrell Williams
- Producer: The Neptunes

Omar Apollo singles chronology
"Killing Me" (2022)	"Tamagotchi" (2022)	"Highlight" (2022)

Music video
- "Tamagotchi" on YouTube

"Tamagotchi" is a song by American singer Omar Apollo from his debut studio album Ivory (2022). It was released as the album's fifth single on March 23, 2022. The song was written by Apollo, Maye, and Najai Washington and produced by The Neptunes. It is named after the Japanese toy of the same name.

== Background ==
In April 2021, Apollo tweeted that he finished creating songs with Pharrell Williams. One of the tracks the two collaborated on was "Tamagotchi", which was announced on March 23, 2022.

== Composition ==
"Tamagotchi" was written by Omar Apollo, Maria Alejandra Osorio, and Najai Washington. The song is a "bass-heavy" Latin-infused trap and R&B song with Spanish guitars and a plucked Samba cadence. It features Apollo rapping and singing in Spanish during the verses and in English during the hook and bridge. Towards the end of the track, Apollo utilizes pitch shifted vocals to distort his voice. With production by The Neptunes, Williams' signature four-beat producer tag can be heard at the beginning of the track.

Lyrically, Apollo sings about material wealth and "living the fast life, yet constantly craving physical connection from that special somebody." The song is noted for having "tongue in-cheek" and forward lyrics about sexuality and queerness, with Apollo bragging about boys and girls lusting over him.

The song features a sample of "I Wanna Rock" by Uncle Luke during its bridge section.

== Critical reception ==
"Tamagotchi" received generally positive reviews by music critics. Sophie Williams of NME praised the production of the song saying that its "bouncy melody is bolstered by pitch-shifted vocals and vivid Pharrell-assisted production." Tomás Mier of Rolling Stone commented on the production and lyrics of the song saying, "With its bouncy Neptunes beat, flirty, bilingual lyrics, and effortlessly catchy chorus, “Tamagotchi” is a perfect example of the qualities that have made Apollo, one of the most exciting artists of his generation." Writers at Billboard placed the song at number 41 on its list of Best Songs of 2022 and claimed that the song's stylistic leap helped earn Apollo his Grammy nomination. Writers at GQ called the song a "catchy" single. Cora Jordan of Clash commended the song's ability to show Apollo's versatility calling it "punchy and jam-packed" and stating that it "clearly shows his range in sound, stepping away from the slow and sultry tone that reflects much of the album and blending into an upbeat, hard-hitting flow." Larisha Paul of The Fader also applauded Apollo's departure from his signature sound, stating he “abandons his signature sleek indie pop” and instead “paints an airy, harmony-filled wonderland as captivating as any dreamy pop performance that preceded it." Jessica McKinney of Complex called the track a "smooth single" and an "upbeat banger".

=== Year-end lists ===
Year-end list rankings for "Tamagotchi"
Publication	Accolade	Rank	Ref.
Billboard	The 100 Best Songs of 2022: Staff List	31	
Esquire	45 Best Songs of 2022	5	
NPR	The 100 Best Songs of 2022	21	
The Fader	The 100 best songs of 2022	13	

== Music video ==
The music video for "Tamagotchi" was directed by Jake Nava and released on April 8, 2022, the same day as the release of Ivory.

== Accolades ==
Award nominations for "Tamagotchi"
Year	Ceremony	Award	Result	Ref.
2022	MTV Video Music Awards	Push Performance of the Year	Nominated	
