= DJ Roc =

American musician

- Birth name: August Wisbon
- Born: September 11, 1989 (age 35); Albuquerque, New Mexico, United States
- Genres: Electronica, House, EDM
- Occupation(s): Record producer, DJ
- Years active: 2007-present
- Labels: DJ Roc Recordings
- Website: www.facebook.com/djrocmusic

August Wisbon (born September 11, 1989), known by DJ Roc, is an American DJ and record producer. He is perhaps best known for his music being featured in numerous TV shows and films, including Arrow, The Eric André Show, Jersey Shore, Rich Kids of Beverly Hills and The Smurfs 2.

His songs have also gained popularity on YouTube, with his channel garnering over 20,000 subscribers and 3 million views.

== Discography ==
=== Singles ===
Title	Year	Label
"Spring Breeze"	2009	DJ Roc Recordings
"Teach Me How to Shuffle"	2011	DJ Roc Recordings
"Sometimes"	2012	DJ Roc Recordings
"Welcome to the Jungle"	2014	DJ Roc Recordings

=== Albums ===
Title	Year	Label
On the Dancefloor	2010	DJ Roc Recordings
Top of the World	2011	DJ Roc Recordings
Smile for Me	2012	DJ Roc Recordings
Forever Summer	2012	DJ Roc Recordings
The City	2013	DJ Roc Recordings
Made for More	2013	DJ Roc Recordings
Lost and Found	2014	DJ Roc Recordings
