= Killing Me (Omar Apollo song) =

2022 single by Omar Apollo

Single by Omar Apollo

from the album Ivory
- Released: March 11, 2022
- Genre: R&B
- Length: 2:45
- Label: Warner
- Songwriter: Omar Apollo
- Producers: Apollo; Mike Hector; Carter Lang; Oscar Santander

Omar Apollo singles chronology
"Invincible" (2022)	"Killing Me" (2022)	"Tamagotchi" (2022)

Lyric video
- "Killing Me" on YouTube

"Killing Me" is a song by American singer Omar Apollo from his debut studio album Ivory (2022). It was released as the album's fourth single on March 11, 2022.

== Composition ==
"Killing Me" was written by Omar Apollo and co-produced with Mike Hector, Carter Lang, and Oscar Santander. The song is a moody and bilingual R&B track with elements of psychedelic music.

Lyrically, the song sees Apollo longing intensely over someone and lusting for their love to the point where it's killing him. During the second verse, Apollo sings in Spanish about swearing that he only thinks of that person while craving for their touch.

== Critical reception ==
"Killing Me" was received positively by music critics. Tomás Mier and Julyssa Lopez of Rolling Stone admired the song's sensual feel as well as Apollo's blend of English and Spanish, calling it one of his "unabashedly sexy releases yet" and that he "makes a seamless switch to Spanish, allowing the song’s sensuality to seep through in another language." Lopez later wrote in a full review of Ivory, that the song does well at capturing the album's overall feel stating, "This is a Mexican American kid from Indiana, proudly singing about queer love and desire while doing exactly what he wants as a musician." Robin Murray of Clash called the song a "bold, lush, and soulful return" with Apollo's vocals being a "lightning rod for emotion" against the song's "hazy and inviting" arrangement. In a review of the song's parent album, Neive McCarthy of Dork remarked that the song was "an alluring, lustful height of the album, practically simmering with desire."

== Live performances ==
Apollo first performed the song on The Tonight Show. The song was later featured on his setlist for Coachella.
