= Evergreen (You Didn't Deserve Me at All) =

Single by Omar Apollo

from the album Ivory
- Released: October 4, 2022
- Genre: R&B
- Length: 3:36
- Label: Warner
- Songwriters: Teo Halm; Manuel Barajas; Omar Velasco
- Producers: Halm; Barajas; Apollo

Omar Apollo singles chronology
"Highlight" (2022)	"Evergreen (You Didn't Deserve Me at All)" (2022)	"3 Boys" (2023)

Music video
- "Evergreen (You Didn't Deserve Me at All)" on YouTube

"Evergreen (You Didn't Deserve Me at All)" (album version titled "Evergreen") is a song by American singer Omar Apollo. On October 4, 2022, it was sent to contemporary hit radio after it had gone viral on TikTok in September 2022. The song serves as the eighth single off Apollo's debut studio album Ivory.

== Background ==
The song originally appeared on Apollo's debut studio album Ivory, simply titled "Evergreen". A few months after the album's release, the song went viral on TikTok. By the end of the month, a snippet of the song had been used in over 300,000 clips. Apollo performed the song as part of his Tiny Desk Concert on September 15, 2022, which caused another surge in streams.

== Reception ==
=== Critical response ===
"Evergreen (You Didn't Deserve Me at All)" received acclaim from critics. Rolling Stone listed "Evergreen (You Didn't Deserve Me at All)" as one of the best songs of 2022, placing it at number 29, and wrote: "...as teardrop guitar licks spill against the soft edges of his falsetto. Apollo packs it all in there—anger, anguish, self-loathing, doubt—but still builds to a bridge bursting with defiant confidence... Apollo has always excelled at these kinds of songs, and it’s thrilling that such a superb display of his skills has finally scored him a well-deserved place on the charts and the broader pop ecosystem."

=== Commercial performance ===
In North America, "Evergreen (You Didn't Deserve Me at All)" debuted at number 62 on the US Billboard Hot 100, for the week ending October 2, 2022. Two weeks later, it peaked at number 51. While in Canada, it peaked at number 43.

In Europe, the song entered the top 5 of the Netherlands' song chart and the top 40 of Ireland and the UK's charts. In Oceania, it has since peaked in the top 20 at number 12 in New Zealand and the top 40 at number 33 in Australia.

== Music video ==
The accompanying music video was premiered on November 19, 2022. It depicts Apollo on a soundstage where a house is being put together only to be blown apart with him in the middle of it but winds up being eventually rebuilt at the end.

== Accolades ==
=== Year-end lists ===
Critics' rankings for Ivory
Publication	Accolade	Rank	Ref.
Billboard	The 25 Best Pride Songs of 2022: Staff Picks	Unranked	
Los Angeles Times	The 100 best songs of 2022 (another 50 songs not to be missed)	Unranked	
NME	The 50 best songs of 2022	25	
Remezcla	10 Best Indie & Alt-Rock Songs of 2022	2	
Rolling Stone	The 100 Best Songs of 2022	29	

== Charts ==
Chart performance for "Evergreen (You Didn't Deserve Me at All)"
Chart (2022)	Peak position
Australia (ARIA)	33
Canada Hot 100 (Billboard)	43
Global 200 (Billboard)	59
Ireland (IRMA)	25
Lithuania (AGATA)	41
Netherlands (Single Tip)	4
New Zealand (Recorded Music NZ)	12
Portugal (AFP)	155
South Africa Streaming (TOSAC)	60
Suriname (Nationale Top 40)	4
Sweden Heatseeker (Sverigetopplistan)	18
UK Singles (Official Charts)	31
US Billboard Hot 100	51
US Pop Airplay (Billboard)	33
US Rock & Alternative Airplay (Billboard)	48

== Certifications ==
Certifications for "Evergreen (You Didn't Deserve Me at All)"
Region	Certification	Certified units/sales
Canada (Music Canada)	Platinum	80,000^{‡}
France (SNEP)	Gold	100,000^{‡}
New Zealand (RMNZ)	2× Platinum	60,000^{‡}
United Kingdom (BPI)	Gold	400,000^{‡}
United States (RIAA)	Platinum	1,000,000^{‡}
^{‡} Sales+streaming figures based on certification alone.

== Release history ==
Release dates and formats for "Evergreen (You Didn't Deserve Me at All)"
Region	Date	Format(s)	Version	Label(s)	Ref.
United States	October 4, 2022	Contemporary hit radio	Original	Warner Records	
Italy	October 14, 2022	Radio airplay	Original	Warner Records	
Various	November 11, 2022	Digital download; streaming	Sped Up Version	Warner Records	
Various	December 2, 2022	Digital download; streaming	Stripped Version	Warner Records	
