= Omar Apollo =

American singer (born 1997)

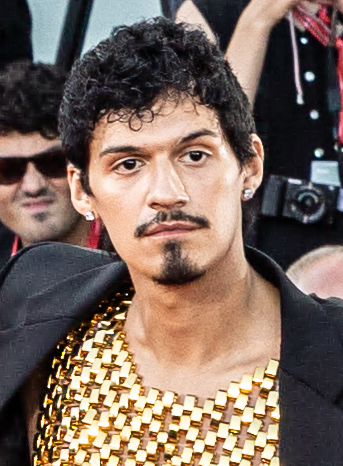
- Apollo at the Venice Film Festival in 2024

Background information
- Born: Omar Apolonio Velasco; May 20, 1997 (age 29); Hobart, Indiana, U.S.
- Genres: R&B; alternative R&B; pop
- Occupations: Singer; songwriter; actor
- Instruments: Vocals; guitar
- Years active: 2017–present
- Labels: AWAL; Warner
- Website: omarapollo.com

Omar Apolonio Velasco (born May 20, 1997), known professionally as Omar Apollo, is an American singer-songwriter. After signing a record deal with Warner Records, his debut album, Ivory, was released in 2022 to positive reviews and earned him a Grammy Award nomination for Best New Artist at the 65th Annual Grammy Awards. Apollo sings in both English and Spanish.

== Early life ==
Omar Apolonio Velasco was born on May 20, 1997, in Hobart, Indiana, to Mexican parents who immigrated to the U.S. from Guadalajara, Jalisco, Mexico. He grew up in Indiana with his three older siblings. Apollo's parents both worked multiple jobs to support the family. His family had a taco shop before he was born called El Super Taco which popularized his family's hot sauce that he would later sell as Disha Hot Sauce. As a child, Apollo was a ballet folklorico dancer and he was also a part of his Catholic church choir.

At the age of 12, Apollo's parents bought him a guitar at his request; however, it was an electric guitar without a guitar amplifier. Apollo traded the electric guitar for an acoustic guitar at a pawn shop. At age 17, he worked at McDonald's to save up enough money to buy a laptop and then a microphone which he used to learn how to sing and play by watching and mimicking YouTube cover videos.

Apollo was also taught by his uncle and he played music at church; he formed a short-lived band with a friend at the church.

== Career ==
=== 2017–2020: Career beginnings, breakthrough and debut mixtape Apolonio ===
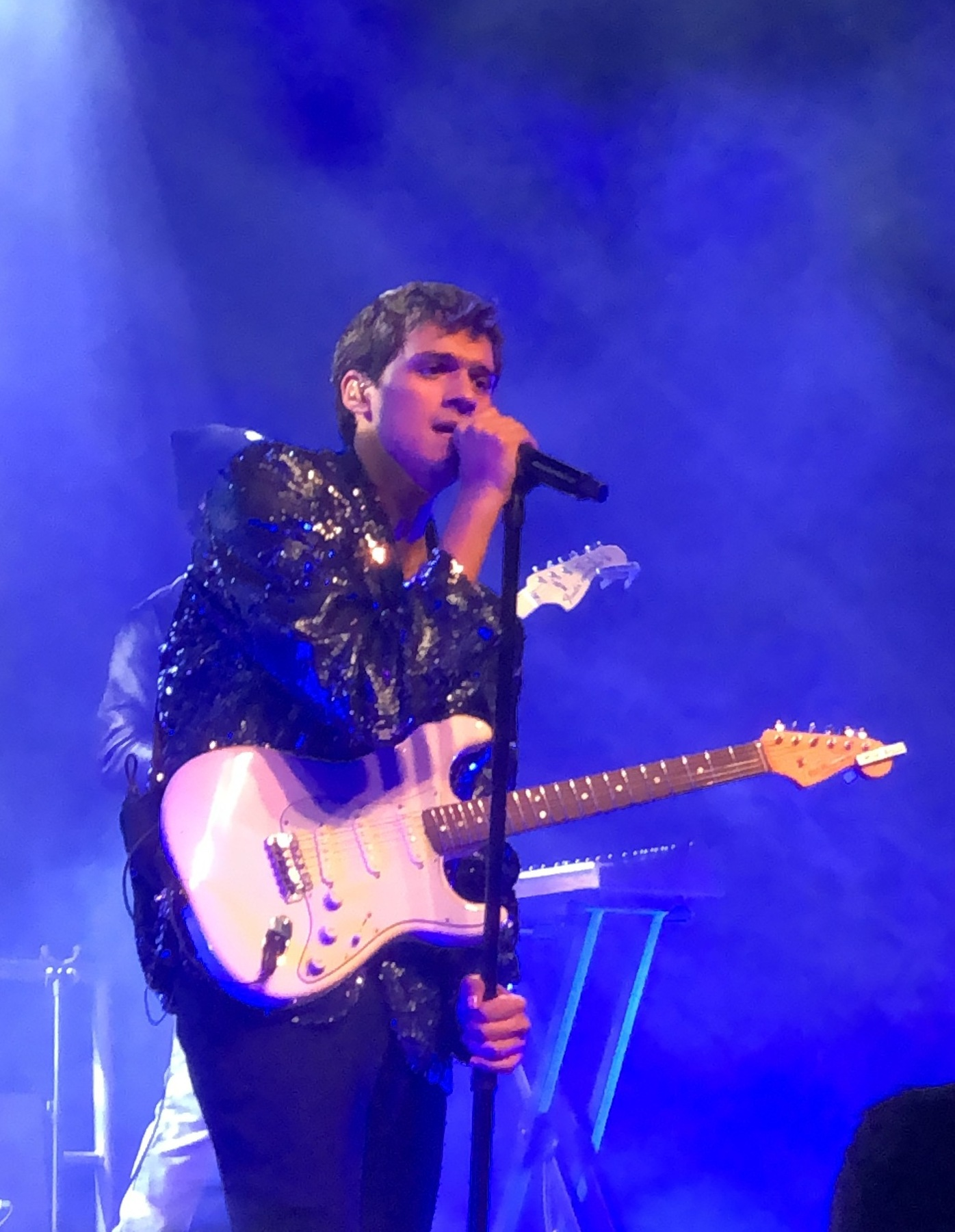
Apollo performing in Brooklyn in December 2019

Apollo created and uploaded his songs to SoundCloud, a platform with DIY streaming. At the time he worked at Jimmy John's and Guitar Center, and he lived in an attic. In 2017, using $30 borrowed from a friend, he uploaded his song "Ugotme" to Spotify, where it was soon added to the platform's Fresh Finds and racked up 20,000 streams in a day. A year later, the song had more than 15 million streams.

He released his first EP, Stereo, in 2018, which was similarly well received. In 2018 and 2019, Apollo went on two tours, the "Want Tour" and the "Voyager Tour." His second EP, Friends, was released in April 2019. The EP featured production by rock producer John Shanks, who had previously worked with artists such as Michelle Branch and Melissa Etheridge. Apollo is managed by Shanks' son, Dylan, whom he met over Twitter in July 2017 when the latter booked Apollo for a university show at NYU. Apollo signed with Artists Without A Label earlier that year and performed at SXSW as part of a showcase with the group. He went on a European tour in 2019 and played at Lollapalooza as well as Tropicália. In late 2019, Apollo released the singles, "Frío" and "Hit Me Up" which are collaborations with producer Kenny Beats. In April 2020, Apollo released the single "Imagine U", another collaboration with Kenny Beats.

On August 7, 2020, Apollo released the lead single "Stayback" from his debut mixtape; and two weeks later released a remix featuring Bootsy Collins, whom Apollo has cited as an influence. On September 10, he released the second single "Kamikaze." On September 25, Apollo appeared on alternative R&B Japanese singer Joji's second album Nectar on the track "High Hopes." Apollo released two more singles, "Dos Uno Nueve (219)" and "Want U Around" (featuring Ruel) before releasing his first mixtape Apolonio on October 16, 2020.

=== 2021–present: Ivory, Live for Me and God Said No ===
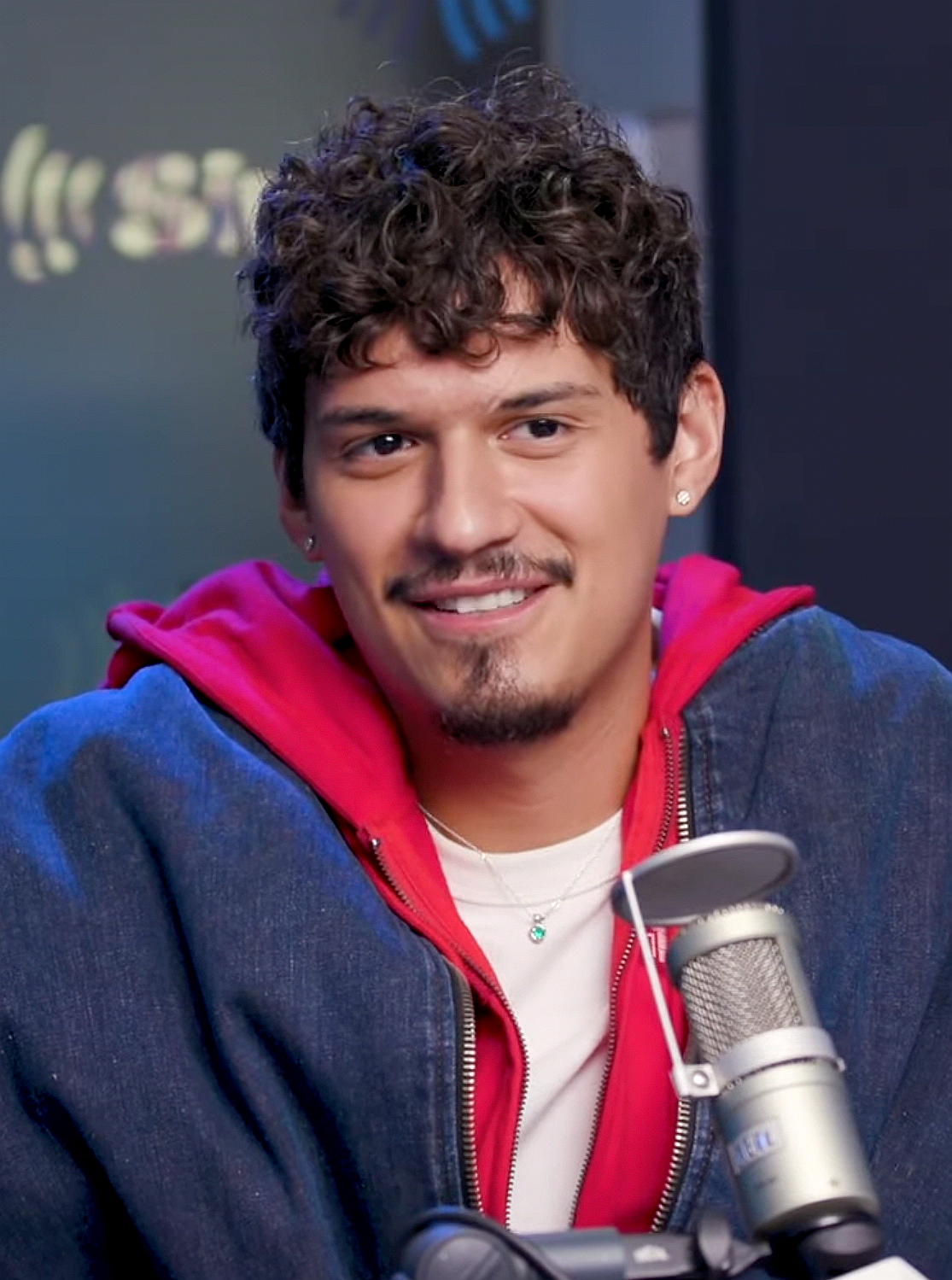
Apollo in December 2022

Apollo was featured on "Te olvidaste" by Spanish artist C. Tangana on his 2021 album El Madrileño. The song received two Latin Grammy Awards nominations for Record of the Year and Best Alternative Song. At the 65th Grammy Awards, Apollo was nominated for Best New Artist, his first Grammy nomination.

In 2021, Apollo released the single "Go Away", including a music video and a live performance on The Tonight Show. He followed up with the single "Bad Life" featuring Kali Uchis, their second collaboration; "Hey Boy" from Apolonio was the first. In February 2022, Apollo released the single "Invincible" featuring Daniel Caesar and announced the release date for his debut album. The next month he released the singles "Killing Me" which included a live performance on The Tonight Show as well as "Tamagotchi," which was co-written and produced by The Neptunes. With the release of "Tamagotchi", Apple Music Up Next selected him as its featured artist for the month in April 2022.

Apollo released his debut studio album Ivory on April 8, 2022, and embarked on the Desvelado tour supporting the album. The album received mostly positive reviews with praises going towards Apollo's musical growth and vocal performance. It entered the Billboard 200 chart, marking his first-ever entry on the chart. The deluxe version of the album, Ivory (Marfil), was released on August 12, 2022. In September 2022, the track "Evergreen" went viral on TikTok which helped boost the song to enter the Spotify and Apple Music charts and eventually debut on Billboard Hot 100 at number 62 for the week ending of October 1, 2022, earning Apollo his first-ever entry on the chart. In response to the rapid success, the song was chosen as the album's next single and was sent to contemporary hit radio on October 4, 2022, making it his first-ever radio single.

In addition to solo tours, Apollo also performed at the Coachella, Something in the Water, and All Points East music festivals in 2022. In early 2023, he opened for SZA on her SOS Tour. Later in 2023, Apollo was announced as the ambassador for the skincare brand Youth to the People. Omar also starred in the fall/winter 2023 men's campaign for the fashion house Loewe. In September, Apollo was honored with the Inspira Award at the 2023 Hispanic Heritage Awards.

In April 2024, Omar released the single "Spite," the first release from his second album God Said No. This was followed by the May 16 release of the second single "Dispose of Me".

The 14-track set was written over the course of a three-month stay in London in 2023, and was inspired by poets Mary Oliver, Victoria Chang, and Ocean Vuong. God Said No was recorded in London's Abbey Road Studios with executive producer Teo Halm with features from Mustafa and actor Pedro Pascal. The title was inspired by a friend's assessment of his recently ended relationship, which Apollo described as "I gave it my everything, and God said 'no.'" The album was released on June 28, 2024. In September 2024, Apollo made his acting debut in the Luca Guadagnino film Queer.

In 2023 Omar Apollo was the cover of issue 17 of Gayletter, photographed by Fabian Guerrero. In December 2024, Omar was named as part of Forbes magazine's 30 Under 30 Music 2025 list.

== Artistry and influences ==
Apollo's music has primarily been described as R&B, alternative R&B, and pop with elements of soul, funk, hip hop, latin music, trap, and bedroom pop.

While growing up, he listened to his parents' favorite musicians such as Pedro Infante, Los Panchos and the Beatles. His own influences include diverse musicians like Neil Young, Paul Simon, John Mayer, Prince, Bootsy Collins, Rick James, and The Internet, a r&b band. When speaking to Billboard, Apollo listed Minnie Riperton's Perfect Angel, Whitney Houston's self-titled album, Nirvana's Nevermind, Kanye West's My Beautiful Dark Twisted Fantasy, and Lauryn Hill's The Miseducation of Lauryn Hill as inspiration for his musical career.

== Personal life ==
Apollo's parents encouraged him to attend college; however Apollo dropped out after two weeks to pursue a musical career. He has Mexican citizenship.

Apollo is gay and has denied queerbaiting allegations saying, 'It's not a choice, it's just what I am. [...] I'm totally aware of the privilege we have now to be ourselves and still have a career [...] people thought I was queerbaiting before. I wasn't super open about my sexuality, but people were hearing things. [...] It had a lot to do with me growing up in Indiana which is very conservative. I stopped putting pronouns in my music for a couple of years then I just realized, I can't let other people's opinions influence and dictate my life. In 2022, a tweet of his went viral addressing the queerbaiting rumors where he responded to a fan saying "i like his song but i don't like supporting straight men doing queerbaiting." Apollo wrote back "no i be sucking d-k fr" ... "from the back." In an interview in 2022, Apollo said, "I feel like in the beginning, [...] I was trying to keep the mystique. But I don't even care anymore [...] now I'm just like, I'm very gay."

As of August 2024, Apollo resides in Pasadena, California.

== Discography ==
Omar Apollo discography
- Studio albums: 2
- EPs: 3
- Singles: 30
- Music videos: 17
- Mixtapes: 1
- Reissue: 1
- Other charted songs: 2
- Guest appearances: 5

=== Studio albums ===
List of albums, with selected details and chart positions
| Title | Details | Peak chart positions | | |
| Title | Details | US | US Heat | AUS |
|---|---|---|---|---|
| Ivory | Released: April 8, 2022; Label: Warner; Format: CD, digital download, streaming, LP | 74 | 1 | — |
| God Said No | Released: June 28, 2024; Label: Warner; Format: CD, digital download, streaming, LP, cassette | 56 | — | 11 |
"—" denotes a recording that did not chart on the respective ranking.

=== Mixtapes ===
List of mixtapes, with selected details and chart positions
| Title | Details | Peak chart positions |
| Title | Details | US Heat |
|---|---|---|
| Apolonio | Released: October 16, 2020; Label: AWAL; Formats: Digital download, LP, streaming | 12 |

=== EPs ===
List of extended plays, with selected details and chart positions
| Title | Details | Peak chart positions |
| Title | Details | US Heat |
|---|---|---|
| Stereo | Released: May 30, 2018; Label: Self-released; Formats: Digital download, streaming | — |
| Friends | Released: April 10, 2019; Label: AWAL; Formats: Digital download, streaming | 19 |
| Live at NPR's Tiny Desk | Released: October 28, 2022; Label: Warner; Formats: Digital download, streaming | — |
| Live for Me | Released: October 6, 2023; Label: Warner; Formats: Digital download, LP, streaming | — |
| God Said No - Live | Released: September 6, 2024; Label: Warner; Formats: Digital download, streaming | — |
"—" denotes a recording that did not chart on the respective ranking.

=== Reissues ===
List of reissues, with selected details
| Title | Details |
|---|---|
| Ivory (Marfil) | Released: August 12, 2022; Label: Warner; Formats: Digital download, streaming |

=== Singles ===
==== As lead artist ====
List of singles with title, year, chart position, certifications, and album
| Title | Year | Peak chart positions | | | | | | | Certifications | Album |
| Title | Year | US | AUS | CAN | IRE | NZ | UK | WW | Certifications | Album |
|---|---|---|---|---|---|---|---|---|---|---|
| "Pram" | 2017 | — | — | — | — | — | — | — | | Non-album single |
| "Ugotme" | 2017 | — | — | — | — | — | — | — | | Stereo |
| "Brakelights" | 2017 | — | — | — | — | — | — | — | | Non-album singles |
| "Algo" (featuring Drayco McCoy) | 2017 | — | — | — | — | — | — | — | | Non-album singles |
| "Unbothered" | 2018 | — | — | — | — | — | — | — | | Non-album singles |
| "Heart" | 2018 | — | — | — | — | — | — | — | | Non-album singles |
| "Erase" | 2018 | — | — | — | — | — | — | — | | Stereo |
| "Ignorin" | 2018 | — | — | — | — | — | — | — | | Stereo |
| "Today" (featuring Teo Halm) | 2018 | — | — | — | — | — | — | — | | Skate Kitchen (OST) |
| "Trouble" | 2019 | — | — | — | — | — | — | — | | Friends |
| "Ashamed" | 2019 | — | — | — | — | — | — | — | | Friends |
| "Friends" | 2019 | — | — | — | — | — | — | — | | Friends |
| "So Good" | 2019 | — | — | — | — | — | — | — | | Friends |
| "Frío" | 2019 | — | — | — | — | — | — | — | | Non-album singles |
| "Hit Me Up" (with Dominic Fike and Kenny Beats) | 2019 | — | — | — | — | — | — | — | | Non-album singles |
| "Imagine U" | 2020 | — | — | — | — | — | — | — | | Non-album singles |
| "Stayback" | 2020 | — | — | — | — | — | — | — | | Apolonio |
| "Kamikaze" | 2020 | — | — | — | — | — | — | — | | Apolonio |
| "Dos Uno Nueve (219)" | 2020 | — | — | — | — | — | — | — | | Apolonio |
| "Want U Around" (featuring Ruel) | 2020 | — | — | — | — | — | — | — | | Apolonio |
| "Go Away" | 2021 | — | — | — | — | — | — | — | | Ivory |
| "Bad Life" (featuring Kali Uchis) | 2021 | — | — | — | — | — | — | — | | Ivory |
| "Invincible" (featuring Daniel Caesar) | 2022 | — | — | — | — | — | — | — | | Ivory |
| "Killing Me" | 2022 | — | — | — | — | — | — | — | | Ivory |
| "Tamagotchi" | 2022 | — | — | — | — | — | — | — | | Ivory |
| "Archetype" | 2022 | — | — | — | — | — | — | — | | Ivory (Marfil) |
| "Highlight" | 2022 | — | — | — | — | — | — | — | | Ivory (Marfil) |
| "Evergreen (You Didn't Deserve Me at All)" | 2022 | 51 | 33 | 43 | 25 | 12 | 31 | 59 | RIAA: Platinum; BPI: Gold; MC: Platinum; RMNZ: 2× Platinum | Ivory |
| "3 Boys" | 2023 | — (Note: "3 Boys" did not enter the Billboard Hot 100 but did chart at No. 27 on the Hot Rock & Alternative Songs charts.) | — | — | — | — (Note: "3 Boys" did not enter the NZ Top 40 Singles Chart, but peaked at number 36 on the NZ Hot Singles Chart.) | — | — | | Non-album single |
| "Ice Slippin" | 2023 | — | — | — | — | — | — | — | | Live for Me |
| "Live for Me" | 2023 | — | — | — | — | — (Note: "Live for Me" did not enter the NZ Top 40 Singles Chart, but peaked at number 33 on the NZ Hot Singles Chart.) | — | — | | Live for Me |
| "Spite" | 2024 | — | — | — | — | — | — | — | | God Said No |
| "Dispose of Me" | 2024 | — (Note: "Dispose of Me" did not enter the Billboard Hot 100 but did chart at No. 38 on the Hot Rock & Alternative Songs charts.) | — | — | — | — | — | — | | God Said No |
| "Te Maldigo" | 2024 | — | — | — | — | — | (Note: "Te Maldigo" did not enter the UK Singles Chart but did chart at No. 39 on the Official Vinyl Singles Chart and No. 77 on the UK Singles Sales Chart.) | — | | Queer |
| "Hecho Para Ti" (with Latin Mafia) | 2025 | — | — | — | — | — | — | — | | Non-album single |
"—" denotes a recording that did not chart on the respective ranking.

==== As featured artist ====
List of singles as featured artist, showing title, year released, and album name
| Title | Year | Peak chart positions | Album |
| Title | Year | US Rock | Album |
|---|---|---|---|
| "12:34 AM" (Billy Lemos featuring Omar Apollo and Maxwell Young) | 2017 | — | Self |
| "Day by Day" (Burns Twins featuring Sam Hudgens and Omar Apollo) | 2017 | — | Non-album single |
| "Bleed" (Malcolm Todd featuring Omar Apollo) | 2025 | 20 | Malcolm Todd |

=== Other charted songs ===
List of other charted songs, with chart position, showing year released and album name
| Title | Year | Peak chart positions | | Album |
| Title | Year | US Rock | SPA | Album |
|---|---|---|---|---|
| "High Hopes" (Joji featuring Omar Apollo) | 2020 | 31 | — | Nectar |
| "Te Olvidaste" (C. Tangana with Omar Apollo) | 2021 | — | 17 | El Madrileño |
"—" denotes a recording that did not chart on the respective ranking.

=== Guest appearances ===
List of non-single guest appearances, with other performing artists, showing year released and album name
| Title | Year | Other artist(s) | Album |
|---|---|---|---|
| "Feel Good" | 2017 | Kopano | Just in Time for Love |
| "Ipanema" | 2019 | Still Woozy, Elujay | Lately |
| "Late Night Lovin'" | 2019 | Deaton Chris Anthony, Jean Dawson, Korbin in Orbit | BO Y |
| "Care" | 2021 | Benny Blanco | Friends Keep Secrets 2 |
| "Still" | 2022 | Kenny Beats | Louie |
| "Worth the Wait" | 2023 | Kali Uchis | Red Moon in Venus |
| "Buyer's Remorse" | 2023 | Daniel Caesar | Never Enough |
| "No Me Busques" | 2026 | — | Grand Theft Auto VI: The Album |

=== Music videos ===
List of music videos, showing year released and director(s)
| Title | Year | Director |
|---|---|---|
| "W/U" / "JRUGZ" | 2017 | Lonewolf, Vin |
| "Pram" / "Brakelights" | 2017 | Darien Eldridge, Vin, Lonewolf |
| "Unbothered" | 2018 | Kevin Lombardo |
| "Ugotme" | 2018 | Mikey Alfred |
| "Ignorin" | 2018 | Lonewolf |
| "Erase" | 2018 | Kevin Lombardo |
| "Trouble" | 2019 | Aidan Cullen |
| "Ashamed" | 2019 | Jimmy Regular |
| "So Good" | 2019 | Kevin Lombardo |
| "Kickback" | 2019 | Matthew Dillon Cohen |
| "Stayback" | 2020 | Aidan Cullen |
| "Kamikaze" | 2020 | Aidan Cullen |
| "Go Away" | 2021 | Jenna Marsh |
| "Bad Life" (featuring Kali Uchis) | 2021 | Alfred Marroquin and Omar Apollo |
| "Invincible" (featuring Daniel Caesar) | 2022 | Stillz |
| "Tamagotchi" | 2022 | Jake Nava |
| "Evergreen (You Didn't Deserve Me At All)" | 2022 | rubberband |
| "Ice Slippin" | 2023 | rubberband |
| "Live For Me" | 2023 | David Heofs (Bandiz) |
| "Spite" | 2024 | David Heofs (Bandiz) |
| "Done With You" | 2024 | Mitch Ryan |

=== Songwriting credits ===
List of songs written or co-written for other artists, showing year released and album name
| Title | Year | Artist(s) | Album |
|---|---|---|---|
| "Amanecer" | 2024 | Danna Paola | Childstar |

== Tours ==
Headlining

- The W.A.N.T. Tour (2018)
- The Voyager Tour (2019)
- The Speed of Sound Tour (2019)
- Desvelado Tour (2022)
- The Prototype Tour (2022)
- God Said No World Tour (2024)

Supporting

- SZA - SOS Tour (2023)
- Billie Eilish - Happier Than Ever, The World Tour (2023)

== Filmography ==
=== Film ===
| Year | Title | Role | Note |
|---|---|---|---|
| 2024 | Queer | Chimu Bar guy | |
| TBA | Tyrant | TBA | Filming |

== Accolades and achievements ==
| Award | Year (Note: Indicates the year of ceremony. Each year is linked to the article about the awards held that year, wherever possible.) | Recipient(s) and nominee(s) | Category | Result | Ref. |
|---|---|---|---|---|---|
| GLAAD Media Awards | 2023 | Omar Apollo | Outstanding Breakthrough Music Artist | Nominated | |
| GLAAD Media Awards | 2025 | God Said No | Outstanding Music Artist | Nominated | |
| GQ Australia Men of the Year Awards | 2024 | Omar Apollo | International Artist of the Year | Won | |
| Grammy Awards | 2023 | Omar Apollo | Best New Artist | Nominated | |
| Hispanic Heritage Awards | 2023 | Omar Apollo | Inspira Award | Won | |
| Latin Grammy Awards | 2021 | "Te Olvidaste" (with C. Tangana) | Record of the Year | Nominated | |
| Latin Grammy Awards | 2021 | "Te Olvidaste" (with C. Tangana) | Best Alternative Song | Nominated | |
| MTV Europe Music Awards | 2022 | Omar Apollo | Best Push | Nominated | |
| MTV Video Music Awards | 2022 | "Tamagotchi" | Push Performance of the Year | Nominated | |
| Premios Juventud | 2026 | "Hecho para ti" (with Latin Mafia) | Best Pop Song – New Generation | Nominated | |
| Queerties Awards | 2023 | Omar Apollo | Best Breakout Musical Artist | Runner-up | |
| Queerties Awards | 2024 | "Ice Slippin" | Best Anthem | Nominated | |
| Queerties Awards | 2025 | "Spite" | Best Anthem | Nominated | |
| Rolling Stone en Español Awards | 2023 | Omar Apollo | Breakout Star of the Year | Nominated | |
| Rolling Stone en Español Awards | 2026 | "Hecho para ti" (with Latin Mafia) | Collaboration of the Year | Pending | |
| UK Music Video Awards | 2022 | "Invincible" (featuring Daniel Caesar) | Best R&B/Soul Video – International | Won | |
| UK Music Video Awards | 2024 | "Spite" | Best R&B/Soul Video – International | Nominated | |
| UK Music Video Awards | 2024 | "Dispose of Me" | Best Live Video | Nominated | |
| Variety Hitmakers | 2022 | Omar Apollo | Future Icon | Won | |
| WOWIE Awards | 2023 | Omar Apollo | Best New Artist | Nominated | |
