= Ivory (Omar Apollo album) =

Studio album by Omar Apollo
- Released: April 8, 2022
- Genres: Pop; R&B
- Length: 40:54
- Languages: English; Spanish
- Label: Warner
- Producers: Rodaidh McDonald; Oscar Santander; Omar Apollo; Carter Lang; Noah Goldstein; Knox Fortune; Tobias Jesso Jr.; Daniel Caesar; Mike Hector; Chromeo; Manuel Barajas; the Neptunes; Teo Halm

Omar Apollo chronology
Apolonio (2020)	Ivory (2022)	Live for Me (2023)

Singles from Ivory
- 1. "Go Away" Released: July 8, 2021; 2. "Bad Life" Released: November 3, 2021; 3. "Invincible" Released: February 9, 2022; 4. "Killing Me" Released: March 11, 2022; 5. "Tamagotchi" Released: March 23, 2022; 6. "Evergreen" Released: October 4, 2022

Deluxe edition cover

Singles from Ivory (Marfil)
- 1. "Archetype" Released: July 15, 2022; 2. "Highlight" Released: August 5, 2022

Ivory is the debut studio album by American singer Omar Apollo, released on April 8, 2022, by Warner Records. The album was promoted by five singles: "Go Away", "Bad Life", "Invincible", "Killing Me" and "Tamagotchi". The album's deluxe edition, titled Ivory (Marfil), featuring five additional tracks including the singles "Archetype" and "Highlight", was released on August 12, 2022. On October 4, 2022, "Evergreen" was released as the overall album's eighth single and Apollo's first radio single.

Ivory received mostly positive reviews, with critics praising Apollo's musical growth and vocal performances. Commercially, the album became Apollo's first-ever entry on the US Billboard 200 peaking at number 74 selling 13,000 album-equivalent units.

== Background ==
Apollo's debut album had to go through a rewriting process as he was dissatisfied with the initial version of the album. Apollo explained, "I had this feeling that I didn't want to promote or tour this music. I wasn't excited about it. It was good music — it wasn't bad music, but it didn't feel like me". Despite the disappointment from his record label Warner, Apollo was allowed to proceed with the rewrite, starting in November 2021, after releasing two lead singles.

On February 9, 2022, Apollo announced the release date as well as the title of the debut album.

=== Singles ===
The album's lead single "Go Away" was released on July 8, 2021. The single was accompanied by a music video and a live performance on The Tonight Show.

"Bad Life" was released as the second single on November 3, 2021. The song features guest vocals from Kali Uchis, making it the second time they collaborate, since the track "Hey Boy" from Apolonio. The single also has a music video.

On February 9, 2022, along with the announcement of the debut album's release date and title, Apollo released the third single "Invincible", which features Daniel Caesar. The single was also supported by a music video.

On March 11, 2022, the fourth single "Killing Me" was released, which included another live performance on The Tonight Show.

The fifth single "Tamagotchi" was released on March 23, 2022. Following the release of the album, the music video for the single was released.

On July 15, 2022, Apollo announced the release of a deluxe version of Ivory along with the release of "Archetype", the album's sixth single and one of the additional tracks from the album's deluxe edition. Another song "Highlight" was released on August 5, 2022.

In September 2022, the track "Evergreen" went viral on the platform TikTok, boosting the song's streams on Spotify and Apple Music and garnering Apollo his first Billboard Hot 100 chart entry. The song was sent to contemporary hit radio on October 4, 2022, as the album's eighth single and Apollo's first radio single.

== Composition ==
Musically, Ivory is described to be an eclectic, genre-hopping pop and R&B album, that incorporates elements of alternative R&B, hip hop, indie-pop, along with sounds of Latin trap, funk, electropop, psychedelic music and traditional Mexican music.

=== Songs ===
The album begins with the title track, "Ivory", serving as a short intro with Apollo singing a cappella. The second track, "Talk" is an uptempo pop punk song with scuzzy, strummed guitars reminiscent of The Strokes. The third track, "No Good Reason", is a song that "bursts into life" features a funky, bubbly synth production noted to be experimental for Apollo. The fourth track, "Invincible", is a collaboration with Daniel Caesar. It is described as a "emotionally climatic" that grapples with mortality and the impact people leave on each other. Clash Music noted that the collaboration was "beautifully arranged" with the symphonic harmonies throughout the song giving it a "hypnotic" sound. The fifth track, "Endlessly Interlude" is an upbeat '90s R&B song. A full version was later released as a track on the deluxe edition of Ivory. "Killing Me" is a bilingual R&B track about longing someone that you can't get out of your head. It is one of the two songs on the album where Apollo is singing in Spanish. "Go Away" is a synth-pop song with confessional lyrics about wanting someone and running out of time with them. Apollo's falsetto and the slick groove of the production were commended.

"En El Olvido", the eleventh track, is a stripped-down corrido sung completely in Spanish. Apollo said he was inspired by performances by Juan Gabriel in creating the song. The twelfth track, "Tamagotchi", is a Latin trap and R&B song featuring production by The Neptunes. The song is described as bass-heavy and flirty with Apollo rap-singing in Spanish and English over a plucked Samba cadence and a bouncy melody. "Evergreen" is an R&B song with an old school Motown feel. Pitchfork praised the song as it showcased Apollo's range, going from "wizened soul belter to '90s boy band innocence". According to Apollo, "Evergreen" was the last song finished and turned in for the album.

== Critical reception ==
Professional ratings
Aggregate scores
Source	Rating
Metacritic	79/100
Review scores
Source	Rating
AllMusic	3.5/5 stars
Clash	8/10
DIY	4/5 stars
Dork	4/5 stars
The Guardian	3/5 stars
NME	4/5 stars
Pitchfork	7.6/10
Riff Magazine	8/10
Rolling Stone	4/5 stars

At Metacritic, which assigns a normalised rating out of 100 to reviews from mainstream critics, the album has an average score of 79, based on seven reviews, indicating "generally favorable reviews".

Reviewing for DIY, Alisdair Grice said "Omar Apollo inspires, and his competence as a vocalist is unmistakable on Ivory. Conflating his electro-pop tendencies with the occasional stride of a campfire guitar, he turns everything he touches to glistening radio gold." Rolling Stone's writer Julyssa Lopez praised Apollo's ability to "[let] the music speak for [his identity and sexuality and that he] doesn’t hold back in his lyrics. Cora Jordon from Clash praised the album and said, "Apollo creates a new sound within his alternative style. Bouncing from indie to alternative R&B to hip-hop, ‘Ivory’ is a culmination of his interests, all mushed together to create his own sense of authenticity." Pitchfork's Cameron Cook praised Apollo's vocals, saying that "while the musicianship on Ivory remains lush and intricate throughout, Apollo's voice has always been his ace in the hole. He can shift from wizened soul belter to '90s boy band innocence in a heartbeat", and then commended the variety of genres by summing up the review with "Apollo’s sheer talent has strained against the limits of the micro-genre he came up in. With its amalgam of genres, tones, and tastes, Ivory goes beyond thinking outside the box: It's as if the box were never even there to begin with." Neive McCarthy of Dork called the album "unpredictable and deeply transformative". Domenic Strazzabosco of Riff Magazine wrote: "Ivory gives Omar Apollo the fullest platform to display his songwriting, vocal dexterity and the converging musical styles that influence him". Meanwhile, in a mixed review, Ammar Kalia of The Guardian labelled the album as "overstuffed", while praising Apollo's vocals and "aptitude for unexpected genres".

=== Accolades ===
Critics' rankings for Ivory
Publication	Accolade	Rank	Ref.
Billboard	The 20 Best Pride Albums of 2022: Staff Picks	Unranked	
Billboard	The 50 Best Albums of 2022: Staff Picks	9	
Complex	50 Best Albums of 2022	25	
Esquire	The 25 Best Albums of 2022	Unranked	
Houston Chronicle	The Best Albums of 2022	4	
I-D	12 seriously incredible albums from spring 2022	Unranked	
NME	The 25 best debut albums of 2022	Unranked	
NPR	The 15 Best Latin Albums Of 2022	Unranked	
PopBuzz	The Best Albums of 2022	6	
Riff Magazine	The 67 best albums of 2022	64	
Rolling Stone	The 100 Best Albums of 2022	15	
Uproxx	The Best Pop Albums of 2022 So Far	Unranked	
Variety	The 10 Best Latin Albums of 2022	3	

== Promotion and tours ==
=== Desvelado tour ===
Ivory was supported by the Desvelado tour. The tour was originally scheduled to be held in 2021, starting from July. However, Apollo later rescheduled the tour to 2022 to give him time to complete production of the album. The tour officially began on April 5, 2022, in Portland, Oregon at the Crystal Ballroom and concluded on June 16, 2022, in London at KOKO. The tour also included two performances at the 2022 Coachella festival on April 15 and 22.

=== Prototype tour ===
To support the album's deluxe edition, Apollo announced the Prototype tour, in collaboration with Ravyn Lenae. The tour began on October 21, 2022, in San Diego, California at the Cal Coast Credit Union Open Air Theatre and concluded on November 29, 2022, in Toronto at the History venue.

=== NPR Tiny Desk ===
In September 2022, Apollo made an appearance on NPR's Tiny Desk Concerts, performing "En El Olvido", "Endlessly", "Petrified", and "Evergreen". The latter performance helping boost the track's streams.

== Track listing ==
Ivory standard track listing
No.	Title	Writer(s)	Producer(s)	Length
1.	"Ivory"	Omar Velasco	Omar Apollo; Rodaidh McDonald; Oscar Santander	0:45
2.	"Talk"	Noah Goldstein; Velasco	Carter Lang; Goldstein; Apollo; Santander	2:37
3.	"No Good Reason"	Velasco	Lang; Apollo; Knox Fortune; Tobias Jesso Jr.	1:48
4.	"Invincible" (featuring Daniel Caesar)	Sean Leon; Ashton Simmonds; Velasco	Apollo; Caesar	3:36
5.	"Endlessly Interlude"	Velasco	Apollo	0:34
6.	"Killing Me"	Velasco	Mike Hector; Lang; Apollo; Santander	2:45
7.	"Go Away"	Velasco	Lang; Apollo; Chromeo	3:27
8.	"Waiting on You"	Goldstein; Velasco	Goldstein; Santander; Apollo; Lang	2:31
9.	"Petrified"	Goldstein; Velasco	Goldstein; Lang; Apollo	3:17
10.	"Personally"	Goldstein; Velasco	Santander; Apollo; Lang; Goldstein	3:31
11.	"En El Olvido"	Velasco	Manuel Barajas; Apollo	2:26
12.	"Tamagotchi"	Maria Alejandra Osorio; Najai Washington; Velasco	The Neptunes	2:48
13.	"Can't Get Over You"	Velasco	Apollo	1:02
14.	"Evergreen"	Teo Halm; Manuel Barajas; Velasco	Halm; Barajas; Apollo	3:36
15.	"Bad Life" (featuring Kali Uchis)	Goldstein; Halm; Velasco	Halm; Apollo	3:17
16.	"Mr. Neighbor"	Goldstein; Velasco	Goldstein; Lang; Apollo	2:46
Total length:				40:54

Ivory (Marfil) deluxe track listing
No.	Title	Writer(s)	Producer(s)	Length
17.	"Endlessly"	Velasco	Apollo; Santander	2:34
18.	"Highlight"	Manuel Lara; Velasco	Manuel Lara; Apollo	2:33
19.	"Archetype"	Velasco	Lang; Apollo; Santander	2:49
20.	"Saving All My Love"	Halm; Velasco	Apollo; Halm	1:15
21.	"Pretty Boy"	Velasco	Lang; Apollo; Santander	3:10

== Charts ==
Chart performance for Ivory
Chart (2022)	Peak position
US Billboard 200 (Billboard)	74
US Heatseekers Albums (Billboard)	1
US Top Alternative Albums (Billboard)	14
US Top Rock & Alternative Albums (Billboard)	27

== Certifications ==
Region	Certification	Certified units/sales
New Zealand (RMNZ)	Gold	7,500^{‡}
United States (RIAA)	Gold	500,000^{‡}
^{‡} Sales+streaming figures based on certification alone.

== Release history ==
Release dates and formats for Ivory
Region	Date	Format	Edition	Label	Ref.
Various	April 8, 2022	CD	Standard	Warner	
Various	April 8, 2022	Digital download; streaming	Standard	Warner	
Various	August 12, 2022	Digital download; streaming	Deluxe (Marfil)	Warner	
Various	March 24, 2023	LP	Standard	Warner	
