= Jorja Smith discography =

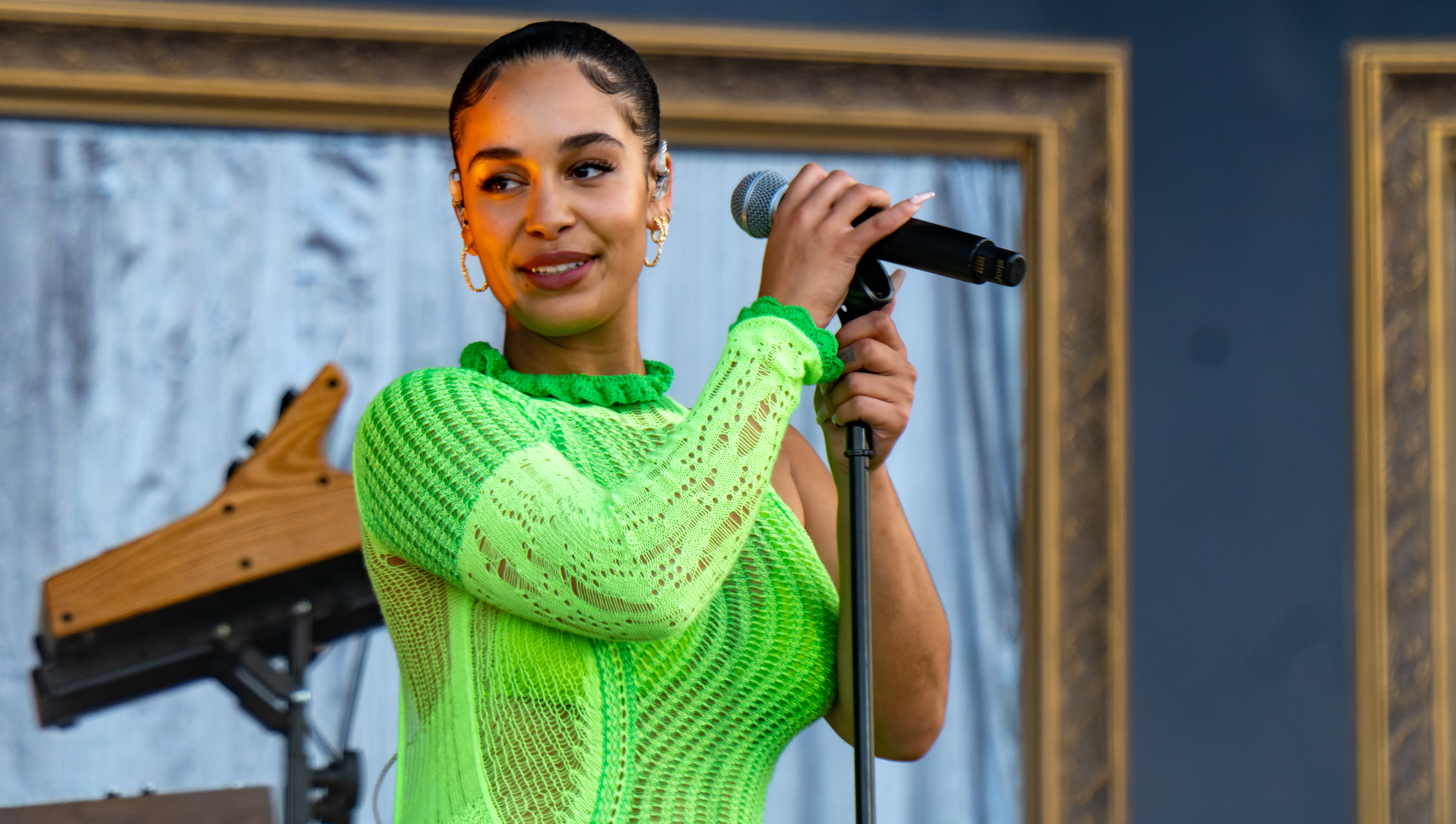
- Jorja Smith performing in 2022.
- Studio albums: 3
- EPs: 3
- Singles: 37
- Promotional singles: 4

The discography of British singer Jorja Smith consists of three studio albums, two extended plays, thirty-two singles, and three promotional singles.

== Studio albums ==
List of studio albums with selected details
Title	Details	Peak chart positions										Sales	Certifications
Title	Details	UK	UK R&B	AUS	BEL (FL)	FRA	IRE	NLD	NZ	SCO	US	Sales	Certifications
Lost & Found	Released: 8 June 2018; Label: FAMM; Format: CD, LP, digital download, cassette, streaming	3	1	13	12	17	14	12	16	15	41	UK: 41,983 (as of September 2018)	BPI: Gold; SNEP: Platinum
Falling or Flying	Released: 29 September 2023; Label: FAMM; Format: CD, LP, digital download, cassette, streaming	3	1	—	22	14	—	23	33	5	—		
What Are the Odds	Released: 21 August 2026; Label: FAMM; Format: CD, LP, digital download, cassette, streaming	17	—	60	71	104	—	—	—	12	—		
"—" denotes a recording that did not chart or was not released in that territory.

== EPs ==
List of extended plays, with selected chart positions
Title	Details	Peak chart positions									
Title	Details	UK	UK R&B	AUS	BEL (FL)	BEL (WA)	FRA	IRE	NLD	NZ	SWI
Project 11	Released: 17 November 2016; Label: FAMM; Format: LP, digital download, streaming	—	—	—	—	—	—	—	—	—	—
Spotify Singles	Released: 13 December 2017; Label: FAMM; Format: Streaming	—	—	—	—	—	—	—	—	—	—
Be Right Back	Released: 14 May 2021; Label: FAMM; Format: CD, LP, digital download, streaming	9	1	49	52	92	81	77	28	27	33
"—" denotes a recording that did not chart or was not released in that territory.

== Singles ==
=== As lead artist ===
Title	Year	Peak chart positions										Certifications	Album
Title	Year	UK	UK Indie	UK R&B	AUS	BEL (FL) Tip	BEL (WA)	FRA	IRE	JPN	NZ Hot	Certifications	Album
"Blue Lights"	2016	38	4	20	—	31	56	69	—	89	—	BPI: Gold; ARIA: Gold; RMNZ: Platinum; SNEP: Diamond	Lost & Found
"Where Did I Go?"	2016	—	13	—	—	—	85	—	—	—	—	BPI: Silver	Lost & Found
"Teenage Fantasy"	2017	77	8	—	—	—	—	—	—	—	—	BPI: Silver	Lost & Found
"On My Mind" (with Preditah)	2017	54	5	—	—	—	—	—	—	—	—	BPI: Gold; ARIA: Platinum; RIAA: Gold; RMNZ: Platinum	Non-album singles
"Let Me Down" (featuring Stormzy)	2018	34	3	—	—	—	—	—	62	—	—	BPI: Gold	Non-album singles
"February 3rd"	2018	75	7	—	—	—	—	192	—	—	—		Lost & Found
"On Your Own"	2018	—	14	—	—	—	—	—	—	—	—		Lost & Found
"The One"	2018	—	16	—	—	4	72	—	—	—	—	BPI: Silver; RMNZ: Gold	Lost & Found
"Don't Watch Me Cry"	2019	73	8	—	—	—	—	—	—	—	—	BPI: Silver	Lost & Found
"Loose Ends" (with Loyle Carner)	2019	62	—	33	—	39	—	—	—	—	—	BPI: Gold	Not Waving, but Drowning
"Goodbyes"	2019	—	10	—	—	—	—	—	—	—	—	BPI: Silver	Lost & Found
"Be Honest" (featuring Burna Boy)	2019	8	2	7	77	3	5	28	20	—	5	BPI: Platinum; ARIA: Platinum; RMNZ: Platinum; SNEP: Platinum	Non-album single
"By Any Means"	2020	89	11	—	—	38	—	—	—	—	28		Reprise
"Come Over" (featuring Popcaan)	2020	35	—	—	—	—	89	—	82	—	—	BPI: Gold	Non-album single
"Come Over (Remix)" (featuring Oboy)	2021	—	—	—	—	—	—	94	—	—	—		Non-album single
"Addicted"	2021	46	4	24	—	—	—	—	—	—	20	BPI: Silver	Be Right Back
"Nobody but You" (with Sonder)	2021	—	—	—	—	—	—	—	—	—	— (Note: "Nobody but You" did not enter the NZ Top 40 Singles Chart, but peaked at number 16 on the NZ Hot Singles Chart.)	BPI: Silver; RIAA: Gold; RMNZ: Gold	Non-album single
"Gone"	2021	79	14	—	—	—	—	—	—	—	28		Be Right Back
"Bussdown" (featuring Shaybo)	2021	56	6	26	—	41	—	—	—	—	22		Be Right Back
"All of This" (with GuiltyBeatz)	2021	—	—	—	—	—	—	—	—	—	—		Non-album single
"Killing Me" (with Sasha Keable)	2021	—	—	—	—	—	—	—	—	—	—		Intermission
"Lavender & Red Roses" (with Ibeyi)	2022	—	—	—	—	—	—	—	—	—	—		Spell 31
"Try Me"	2023	60	19	37	—	—	—	—	—	—	28		Falling or Flying
"Little Things"	2023	11	2	4	—	—	—	—	15	—	25	BPI: Platinum; RMNZ: Platinum	Falling or Flying
"Go Go Go"	2023	—	—	—	—	—	—	—	—	—	29		Falling or Flying
"Stay Another Day"	2023	16	2	—	—	—	—	—	—	—	—		Non-album singles
"Go Go Go" (featuring Josman)	2024	—	—	—	—	—	—	147	—	—	—		Non-album singles
"High"	2024	—	—	—	—	—	—	—	—	—	32		Non-album singles
"Loving You" (featuring Maverick Sabre)	2024	—	—	—	—	—	—	—	—	—	—		Non-album singles
"Don't Let Me Go"	2024	—	—	—	—	—	—	—	—	—	—		Non-album singles
"The Way I Love You"	2025	39	7	—	—	—	—	—	—	—	39		Non-album singles
"With You"	2025	95	29	—	—	—	—	—	—	—	—		Non-album singles
"Don't Leave"	2026	—	—	—	—	—	—	—	—	—	38		
"Price of It All"	2026	—	—	—	—	—	—	—	—	—	—		Bait (Music From the Original Series)
"What's Done Is Done"	2026	—	—	—	—	—	—	—	—	—	—		What Are the Odds
"Alive" (featuring Wizkid)	2026	—	—	—	—	—	—	—	—	—	—		What Are the Odds
"I Lied, You Lied"	2026	—	—	—	—	—	—	—	—	—	—		What Are the Odds
"—" denotes a recording that did not chart or was not released in that territory.

=== Promotional singles ===
Title	Year	Album
"A Prince"	2016	Non-album singles
"Beautiful Little Fools"	2017	Non-album singles
"Rose Rouge"	2020	Bluenote Reimagined
"Finally"	2023	The Color Purple (Music From and Inspired by the Motion Picture)

=== As featured artist ===
Title	Year	Peak chart positions							Certifications	Album
Title	Year	UK	UK R&B	FRA	BEL (FL)	IRE	NZ	SWI	Certifications	Album
"People" (Cadenza featuring Jorja Smith and Dre Island)	2016	—	—	—	—	—	—	—		Non-album single
"Tyrant" (Kali Uchis featuring Jorja Smith)	2017	—	—	—	—	—	—	—		Isolation
"Bridge over Troubled Water" (as part of Artists for Grenfell)	2017	1	—	—	26	25	— (Note: "Bridge over Troubled Water" did not enter the NZ Top 40 Singles Chart, but peaked at number four on the NZ Heatseekers Singles Chart.)	28	BPI: Gold	Non-album singles
"Follow the Leader" (George the Poet and Maverick Sabre featuring Jorja Smith)	2018	—	—	—	—	—	—	—		Non-album singles
"Go 2.0" (Alex da Kid featuring Jorja Smith, H.E.R. and Rapsody)	2018	—	—	—	—	—	—	—		Non-album singles
"Reason in Disguise" (Ezra Collective featuring Jorja Smith)	2018	—	—	—	—	—	—	—		You Can't Steal My Joy
"Slow Down" (Maverick Sabre featuring Jorja Smith)	2019	—	—	—	—	—	—	—	BPI: Gold; RMNZ: Gold	When I Wake Up
"Peng Black Girls (Remix)" (Enny featuring Jorja Smith)	2020	—	—	—	—	—	—	—		Non-album single
"Patience" (Wesley Joseph featuring Jorja Smith)	2021	—	—	—	—	—	—	—		Ultramarine
"1000 Nights" (Jaykae featuring Jorja Smith)	2021	—	—	—	—	—	—	—		Non-album single
"My Sister" (Shaybo featuring Jorja Smith)	2021	—	—	—	—	—	—	—		Queen of the South
"In the Night" (Childish Gambino featuring Jorja Smith & Amaarae)	2024	98	—	—	—	—	—	—		Bando Stone & the New World
"Crush" (AJ Tracey featuring Jorja Smith)	2025	23	8	—	—	81	—	—	BPI: Silver	Non-album single
"Down for You" (Mobb Deep featuring Nas and Jorja Smith)	2025	—	—	—	—	—	—	—		Infinite
"Get Me Down" (Nia Archives featuring Jorja Smith)	2026	—	—	—	—	—	—	—		Emotional Junglist
"Coming Home" (Odeal featuring Jorja Smith)	2026	—	—	—	—	—	— (Note: "Coming Home" did not enter the NZ Top 40 Singles Chart, but peaked at number 9 on the NZ Hot Singles Chart.)	—		For a Good Time...
"Jet Lag" (Tiakola featuring Jorja Smith)	2026	—	—	8	—	—	—	—		WpointM
"—" denotes a recording that did not chart or was not released in that territory.

== Other charted and certified songs ==
List of other charted and certified songs, with selected chart positions, showing year released and album name
Title	Year	Peak chart positions										Certifications	Album
Title	Year	UK	UK Indie	UK R&B	CAN	GER	IRE	NLD	SWE	US	US R&B	Certifications	Album
"Jorja Interlude" (Drake featuring Jorja Smith)	2017	42	—	14	28	—	51	84	— (Note: "Jorja Interlude" did not enter the Swedish Singellista chart, but peaked at number four on the Swedish Heatseeker chart.)	49	—	BPI: Silver	More Life
"Get It Together" (Drake featuring Black Coffee and Jorja Smith)	2017	24	—	5	20	67	30	58	88	45	9	ARIA: Platinum; BPI: Platinum; RMNZ: Gold	More Life
"Gum Body" (Burna Boy featuring Jorja Smith)	2019	—	—	—	—	—	—	—	—	—	—	BPI: Silver	African Giant
"I Am"	2018	62	—	32	80	—	—	—	—	— (Note: "I Am" did not enter the Billboard Hot 100 chart, but peaked at number five on the Bubbling Under Hot 100 Singles chart.)	9		Black Panther: The Album
"Lost & Found"	2018	—	11	—	—	—	—	—	—	—	—		Lost & Found
"Wandering Romance"	2018	—	25	—	—	—	—	—	—	—	—		Lost & Found
"Lifeboats (Freestyle)"	2018	—	26	—	—	—	—	—	—	—	—		Lost & Found
"Tomorrow"	2018	—	29	—	—	—	—	—	—	—	—		Lost & Found
"Home"	2021	—	37	—	—	—	—	—	—	—	—		Be Right Back
"Burn"	2021	—	39	—	—	—	—	—	—	—	—		Be Right Back
"Time"	2021	—	46	—	—	—	—	—	—	—	—		Be Right Back
"Feelings" (featuring J Hus)	2023	50	26	32	—	—	—	—	—	—	—		Falling or Flying
"—" denotes a recording that did not chart or was not released in that territory.

== Other guest appearances ==
List of other non-single guest appearances, showing release year and album
Title	Year	Other artist(s)	Album
"Location" (Remix)	2018	Khalid, Wretch 32	Non-album remix
"My World"	2018	OSHUN	Bittersweet, Vol.
"I Can't Be My Old Self Forever"	2019	None	A Shaun the Sheep Movie: Farmageddon (Original Motion Picture Soundtrack)
"Make It Right"	2019	None	Rapman Presents: Blue Story (Music Inspired By the Original Motion Picture)
"Im Workin"	2020	Giggs	Now or Never
"Kiss Me in the Morning"	2020	None	The Eddy (From the Original Netflix Series)
"Meanwhile"	2021	Gorillaz, Jelani Blackman, Barrington Levy	Meanwhile EP
"Darjeeling"	2022	FKA Twigs, Unknown T	Caprisongs
"Conscience"	2022	Beam	Alien
"Hard For It"	2022	Miraa May	Tales of a Miracle
"Somebody Else"	2022	Calvin Harris, Lil Durk	Funk Wav Bounces Vol. 2
"Wifey Riddim"	2025	Shygirl, SadBoi	Club Shy Room 2
"July"	2026	Wesley Joseph	Forever Ends Someday

== Music videos ==
Title	Year	Director(s)	Ref.
"A Prince"	2016	Yao Xiang	
"Blue Lights"	2016	Drew Cox	
"Where Did I Go?"	2016	Jorja Smith	
"Beautiful Little Fools"	2017	Hector Dockrill	
"Teenage Fantasy"	2017	Rashid Babiker	
"On My Mind" (with Preditah)	2017	Hector Dockrill	
"Let Me Down" (featuring Stormzy)	2018	Hector Dockrill	
"Blue Lights"	2018	Olivia Rose	
"On Your Own"	2018	Rashid Babiker	
"The One"	2018	Rashid Babiker	
"Blue Lights" (French Remix) (featuring Dosseh)	2018	Aldo Hacheme	
"Goodbyes"	2019	Rashid Babiker	
"Be Honest"	2019	Amber Grace Johnson	
"By Any Means"	2020	Otis Dominique	
"Home"	2021	Rob Akin	
"Addicted"	2021	Jorja Smith; Savanah Leaf	
"Little Things"	2023	Bolade Banjo	
