= Tyrant (Kali Uchis song) =

2017 single by Kali Uchis

Single by Kali Uchis featuring Jorja Smith

from the album Isolation
- Released: May 22, 2017
- Genre: R&B
- Length: 3:24
- Label: Virgin EMI; Interscope
- Songwriters: Karly Marina Loaiza; Mark Spears; Jorja Smith; Larrance Dopson; Jairus Mozee
- Producers: Sounwave; Larrance Dopson; Jairus Mozee

Kali Uchis singles chronology
"Only Girl" (2017)	"Tyrant" (2017)	"Tirano" (2017)

Music video
- "Tyrant" on YouTube

"Tyrant" is a song by American singer Kali Uchis featuring English singer Jorja Smith. It was released on May 22, 2017, by Virgin EMI Records and Interscope Records, as the first single from Uchis' debut studio album, Isolation (2018).

== Background and composition ==
Uchis stated that "Tyrant" is a post-apocalyptic love song about choosing to ignore a relationship's fatal imbalances: "Wanting to stay in the haze of puppy love forever and never face the power struggles, because that's your only real escape from the cold realities of life." She explained to Genius how the whole song came out, "I was in the studio with Sounwave, and we were just going through a whole bunch of different song ideas that we had, potentially for the album. When he played that one, it just came into my head. And then, I used some lyrics from a really old song of mine that I never released. Like, the first two lines of it was from an old song. That's how I jumped it off, and then the rest of it just came rolling in right after."

== Critical reception ==
Beca Grimm of NPR gave a positive review for the song and wrote, "'Tyrant' is a romantic banger flecked with self-awareness. It skilfully portrays love in the age of rumbling dystopia: a boudoir anointed by something pure even though its walls may shake with the unrest outside."

== Track listing ==
- Digital download
1. "Tyrant" (featuring Jorja Smith) — 3:24
- Digital download
1. "Tyrant" (remix; featuring Daniel Caesar — 3:24
- Digital download
1. "Tirano" (featuring Fuego) — 3:24

== Certifications ==
Certifications for "Tyrant"
Region	Certification	Certified units/sales
United States (RIAA)	Gold	500,000^{‡}
^{‡} Sales+streaming figures based on certification alone.

== Release history ==
Release formats for "Tyrant"
Region	Date	Version	Format	Label	Ref.
Various	May 22, 2017	Original	Digital download; streaming	Virgin EMI; Interscope	
Various	July 6, 2017	Daniel Caesar remix	Digital download; streaming	Virgin EMI; Interscope	
Various	July 21, 2017	"Tirano"	Digital download; streaming	Virgin EMI; Interscope	
