= Yung Tory =

Canadian rapper from Ontario

- Born: Tory Patterson Christie; April 24, 1996 (age 30)
- Origin: Toronto, Ontario, Canada
- Genres: Canadian hip hop
- Occupations: Rapper; singer; songwriter
- Years active: 2015–present
- Labels: Def Jam; Mosley Music; OTF

Tory Lester Zellars (born April 24, 1996), better known by his stage name Yung Tory (or Mr. Yaw Yaw), is a Canadian rapper from Mississauga, Ontario. He initially signed with Lil Durk's Only the Family in 2017, but parted ways the following year in favor of Timbaland's Mosley Music Group, an imprint of Def Jam Recordings. He released his debut studio album, Rastar, in early 2019.

== Early life ==
Tory was born in Toronto, Canada, and spent most of his childhood in Atlanta or Toronto. He is of Jamaican descent and is one of the few artists to combine the rap and the rasta lifestyle. He is a lifelong vegan and is a committed Rastafarian. He was influenced in his rap style by listening to Lil Wayne, Dipset and 50 Cent. He first found his love for music as a toddler, rapping over beats on his father's Xbox console.

== Career ==
Yung Tory has been rapping since 2011. He was noticed by Lil Durk who signed Yung Tory in 2017.

He was signed to Def Jam Recordings in 2019 and subsequently released his debut album Rastar in March. The song of the same name was sampled by Jorja Smith on "Be Honest" featuring Burna Boy. In the same year he released the single "Friends," a song he which he used a sample from the artist Anne Marie's Marshmello, and his biggest personal single "Netflix & Chill" featuring Shoreline Mafia's Fenix Flexin.

He released his debut EP Still Here in September 2019. The album was released on Timbaland's label Mosley Music Group.

Yung Tory released the single "2020" on January 24, 2020.

== Discography ==
=== Studio albums ===
- Rastar

=== Extended plays ===
- Still Here

=== Compilation albums ===
- 6ixUpsideDown (by 6ixBuzz)
