= Be Right Back (EP) =

EP by Jorja Smith
- Released: 14 May 2021
- Genre: R&B
- Length: 25:38
- Label: FAMM
- Producers: Joel Compass; Riccardo Damian; Rahki; Ed Thomas; Gitty; Kal Banx; Charlie J. Perry

Jorja Smith chronology
Lost & Found (2018)	Be Right Back (2021)	Falling or Flying (2023)

Singles from Be Right Back
- 1. "Addicted" Released: 10 March 2021; 2. "Gone" Released: 19 April 2021; 3. "Bussdown" Released: 14 May 2021

Be Right Back is the third extended play by British singer Jorja Smith. The record was released on 14 May 2021 by FAMM. Self described as a "waiting room" in preparation for her sophomore album, Be Right Back features writing and production from long time collaborators Joel Compass and Ed Thomas, amongst others, as well as guest vocals from British-Nigerian rapper Shaybo. Written and recorded over a two-year period, Be Right Back sonically adopts experimental song structures and lyrically revolves around the complexity of ideal womanhood, relationships and self-awareness.

Upon its release, Be Right Back received generally positive reviews from critics who praised Smith's vocals and noted it as a worthy prelude to her follow up album. The EP was promoted with the release of three singles; "Addicted", "Gone" and "Bussdown".

== Background ==
"It's called be right back because it's just something I want my fans to have right now, this isn't an album and these songs wouldn't have made it. If I needed to make these songs, then someone needed to hear them too."

— Jorja Smith, discussing Be Right Back

Smith described Be Right Back as a "waiting room" in preparation for her upcoming second studio album. Be Right Back was written and recorded over a two-year period (2019–2021), and was used by Smith as a way to give herself closure over numerous situations that happened during that two-year period.

== Music and lyrics ==
Be Right Back is an eight-track set that takes influence from jazz, R&B and trip-hop. The album adopts unconventional song structure and was noted for its experimental production, seen by Kyann-Sian Williams of NME as "moving away from her traditional soulful and garage sounds." Robin Murray from Clash stated the album expanded on the "luxurious modern soul" of Smith's debut album with influences of British underground music described by Murray as a "London-centric Soulquarian vibe." Eric Torres of Pitchfork noted the album's musical style as being "contrasting", stating that Smith takes influence from hip-hop production, but focuses on "mellower, guitar- and piano-driven instrumentation." The album lyrics adopt a poetic style and discuss the complexity of womanhood, relationships and self-awareness.

Be Right Back opens with "Addicted" a rock inspired song which features "wispy keyboards, a stuttering snare drum, smoky guitars" and was compared by Chris Deville of Stereogum to Radiohead. "Gone" features a 2 step production, with electro inspired drums, keyboards and Smith delivering her vocals in a "half spoken" style. Bussdown is an afroswing track that features guest vocals by British rapper Shaybo. Kyann-Sian Williams of NME compared the song to Smith's own "Be Honest" (2019). Shaybo's verse was noted as a departure from her usually aggressive rhymes, opting for a slower delivery. Lyrically the song discusses the juxtaposition between fame and happiness.

"Home" is built over an electric guitar. "Burn" is a jazz song that features rhythmic bass', guitar and "rolling" vocals which were described by Eric Torres of Pitchfork as sounding on the "verge of tears." "Digging" is a pop rock song with "angsty 80s pop" influences according to Kadish Morris of The Guardian. Candace McDuffie of Paste magazine described the song beginning "with intriguing reverb and escalates to feel-good, cascading rhythms". McDuffie also described the lyrics as "existential" noting Smith's mention of heaven. The EP's closing song "Weekend" is an alternative R&B song with a minimalist production and operatic singing that was compared to the work of Willow Smith by Kyann-Sian Williams of NME.

== Release and promotion ==
Be Right Back was released on 14 May 2021 to digital music and streaming platforms. Be Right Back was Smith's third extended play and first major release since Lost & Found (2018). Smith initially wanted to call the project This Is Not My Second Album, telling Apple Music that Be Right Back was a collection of songs that she had written but were not intended for her second studio album.

The EP was promoted with the release of three singles. "Addicted" was released as the first single to streaming platforms on 10 March 2021. Acclaimed by critics, the song peaked at forty-six on the UK Singles Chart. "Gone" was released as the EP's second single on 19 April 2021. The song failed to chart on any major platforms but peaked at number twenty-nine on the UK Independent Singles Charts. The third single "Bussdown" featuring Shaybo was released on 13 May 2021 and peaked at fifty-six on the UK Singles Chart.

== Critical reception ==
Professional ratings
Aggregate scores
Source	Rating
Metacritic	73/100
Review scores
Source	Rating
Clash	8/10
NME	3/5 stars
Paste	7.5/10
Pitchfork	7.2/10

Be Right Back received generally positive reviews from critics. At Metacritic, which assigns a normalized rating out of 100 to reviews from mainstream publications, the album received an average score of 73, based on 7 reviews.

Robin Murray of Clash described the EP as "immaculate", commending Jorja for "opening out her sound, and finessing her approach", noting that "she's only just getting started". NME critic Kyann-Sian Williams praised Smith's experimental vocals and the live instruments, and described Be Right Back as a "perfect prelude to her next chapter". Likewise Candace McDuffie of Paste magazine felt the EP was a "promising" sign of what Smith's follow up album would offer stating "hopefully, the singer will experiment even further with more rich and upbeat tunes that will heighten the dynamism of her already-indelible voice."

Eric Torres editor of Pitchfork called Smith's vocals the "most appealing quality", noting her ability to use her voice to tap into "various emotional states." Torres summed the extended play stating "With stripped-back instrumentation and poignant emotion, the English singer's latest release is a stopgap EP that punches above its weight." Kadish Morris of The Guardian praised the extended plays rewind factor stating "Digging's angsty 80s pop rock energy and Bussdown's (featuring rapper Shaybo) subtle dancehall beat are nice enough to rewind, proving that this is more than just an ephemeral work." However Kadish believed the EP followed covered the "familiar ground" of Lost & Found (2018).

== Track listing ==
Be Right Back track listing
No.	Title	Writer(s)	Producer(s)	Length
1.	"Addicted"	Jorja Smith; Femi Koleoso; Mutale Chashi; Joel Compass; Amane; Benjamin Totten	Compass; Riccardo Damian	3:24
2.	"Gone"	Smith; Emawk; Columbus Smith III	Rahki	3:15
3.	"Bussdown" (featuring Shaybo)	Smith; Jeff Gitelman; Kalon "Kal Banx" Berry; Laura Adeola Adegbite	Gitty	3:21
4.	"Time"	Smith; Michael Stafford; Charlie J. Perry	Perry	1:54
5.	"Home"	Smith; Stafford; Ed Thomas	Thomas	2:46
6.	"Burn"	Smith; Gitelman; Berry	Gitty; Kal Banx	3:34
7.	"Digging"	Smith; Koleoso; Chashi; Compass; Amane; Totten	Compass; Damian	3:04
8.	"Weekend"	Smith; Chashi; Compass	Rahki; Compass	4:17
Total length:				25:38

== Charts ==
Chart performance for Be Right Back
Chart (2021)	Peak position
Australian Albums (ARIA)	49
Australian Hip Hop/R&B Albums (ARIA)	12
Belgian Albums (Ultratop Flanders)	52
Belgian Albums (Ultratop Wallonia)	95
Dutch Albums (Album Top 100)	28
German Albums (Offizielle Top 100)	94
Irish Albums (IRMA)	77
Lithuanian Albums (AGATA)	24
New Zealand Albums (RMNZ)	27
Scottish Albums (Official Charts)	49
Swiss Albums (Schweizer Hitparade)	33
UK Albums (Official Charts)	9
UK Independent Albums (Official Charts)	9
UK R&B Albums (Official Charts)	1

== Release history ==
Release dates and formats for Be Right Back
Region	Date	Format(s)	Label	Ref.
Various	14 May 2021	Digital download; streaming	FAMM	
Germany	27 August 2021	Twelve-inch vinyl	FAMM	

== See also ==
- List of UK R&B Albums Chart number ones of 2021
