= What Are the Odds (album) =

Studio album by Jorja Smith
- Released: 21 August 2026
- Genres: Dance; UK garage; R&B; Afro house
- Length: 37:30
- Label: FAMM
- Producers: Marco Bernardis; Cole YoursTruly; Deats; P2J; Sucuki

Jorja Smith chronology
Falling or Flying (2023)	What Are the Odds (2026)

What Are the Odds ratings
Aggregate scores
Source	Rating
Metacritic	73/100
Review scores
Source	Rating
AllMusic	3.5/5 stars
The Arts Desk	4/5 stars
Beats Per Minute	70%
Clash	8/10
Dork	5/5 stars
NME	4/5 stars
Pitchfork	6.6/10
Rolling Stone UK	4/5 stars
Spectrum Culture	69%

What Are the Odds is the third studio album by the English singer and songwriter Jorja Smith. It was released on 21 August 2026 by FAMM. The album was primarily produced by the British-Nigerian producer P2J, with guest appearances from the Nigerian singer Wizkid and the English grime rapper Devlin.

The album marks a departure from the predominantly R&B and soul-influenced sound of Smith's earlier work, instead incorporating elements of UK garage, 2-step garage, UK funky, house music and Afrobeats.

== Background and recording ==
Following the release of her second studio album, Falling or Flying (2023), Smith continued to explore dance-oriented music. She had previously worked with P2J on the 2023 single "Little Things", which incorporated elements of UK garage and dance music.

Smith and P2J initially entered the studio intending to record a four-song dance EP. According to Smith, P2J had already prepared a collection of instrumental tracks, and the pair recorded nine songs during their first two days of sessions. The project subsequently expanded into a full-length album.

Smith said that she regarded the material as an album rather than an EP after hearing the results of the recording sessions. The relatively short recording period distinguished the project from Smith's previous albums.

== Music and composition ==
What Are the Odds is primarily a dance record that incorporates several styles associated with British club music. P2J's production combines two-step, UK funky and house with electronic percussion, synthesizers and bass-heavy arrangements. The Guardian described the album as a collection of Black British dance music incorporating UK garage, funky house and 2-step alongside Afrobeats.

The album retains elements of Smith's characteristic vocal style while placing her vocals within more rhythmically driven rrangements. Apple Music described the album as Smith's full commitment to the dance floor after earlier songs such as "On My Mind" and "Little Things" incorporated club-oriented sounds.

The lyrics address relationships, personal change, loss and self-reflection. "For Life" concerns addiction and the death of a friend, while "The Way It Was" reflects on the end of a friendship. "Young Heart" is directed toward Smith's younger self.

"This City" features Devlin and addresses Smith's relationship with London. The song incorporates Devlin's earlier work "London City". Wizkid appears on "Alive", continuing Smith's collaboration with P2J and expanding the album's connection to Afrobeats.

== Track listing ==
What Are the Odds track listing
No.	Title	Writer(s)	Producer(s)	Length
1.	"For Life"	Jorja Smith; Richard Isong; Hope Katana; Millie Katana	P2J	2:48
2.	"What Are the Odds"	Smith; Isong; Elizabeth Osaguona; Dominik Patrzek; Ezrah Roberts-Grey	P2J; Deats	2:37
3.	"What's Done Is Done"	Smith; Isong; Michael Stafford	P2J	2:53
4.	"This City" (featuring Devlin)	Smith; Christopher Butler; Jordan Crisp; James Devlin; Isong; H. Katana; M. Katana; Cole Ostrin; Lloyd Perrin; Hikaru Utada	P2J; Cole YoursTruly	3:15
5.	"Pretend"	Smith; Isong; H. Katana; M. Katana; Ostrin	P2J; Cole YoursTruly	2:43
6.	"The Way It Was"	Smith; Joel Baely; Isong; Ostrin; Stafford; Ed Thomas	P2J; Cole YoursTruly	3:44
7.	"I Lied, You Lied"	Smith; Baely; Marco Bernardis; Isong; Stafford	P2J; Bernardis	3:23
8.	"Dancing"	Smith; Isong; Rhea Robles; Stafford	P2J	2:41
9.	"Alive" (featuring Wizkid)	Smith; Ayodeji Balogun; Clementine Douglas; Isong	P2J	3:27
10.	"Young Heart"	Smith; Isong; H. Katana; M. Katana; Ostrin	P2J; Cole YoursTruly	4:00
11.	"Make It Your Home"	Smith; Ariowa Irosogie; Isong; Evîn Kücükali; Ostrin	P2J; Cole YoursTruly	2:46
12.	"When It Gets Like That"	Smith; Baely; Tim Friedrich; Irosogie; Isong	P2J; Sucuki	3:08
Total length:				37:30

== Personnel ==
Credits are adapted from Tidal.

- Jorja Smith – lead vocals, background vocals
- Sam Harper – mixing
- Prash "Engine-Earz" Mistry – mastering
- Richard Isong – programming (all tracks), electric piano (track 3)
- Cole Ostrin – strings (1, 9, 10), electric guitar (4, 5), programming (6), electric bass guitar (11)
- Dominik Patrzek – programming (2)
- James Devlin – vocals (4)
- Joel Baely – vocal arrangement (7, 9, 10, 12)
- Marco Bernardis – electric piano, piano, saxophone (7)
- Ayodeji Balogun – lead vocals (9)
- Evîn Kücükali – vocal effects (11)

== Charts ==
Chart performance for What Are the Odds
Chart (2026)	Peak position
Australian Albums (ARIA)	60
Belgian Albums (Ultratop Flanders)	71
Belgian Albums (Ultratop Wallonia)	25
German Albums (Offizielle Top 100)	25
Scottish Albums (Official Charts)	12
UK Albums (Official Charts)	17
UK Dance Albums (Official Charts)	1
UK Independent Albums (Official Charts)	1
