= Be Honest =

2019 single by Jorja Smith featuring Burna Boy

Single by Jorja Smith featuring Burna Boy
- Released: 16 August 2019
- Genre: Afrobeats
- Length: 3:27
- Label: FAMM
- Songwriters: Miraa May; Damini Ogulu; Jorja Smith
- Producers: Cadenza; IzyBeats; Kyle Stemberger

Jorja Smith singles chronology
"Goodbyes" (2019)	"Be Honest" (2019)	"By Any Means" (2020)

Burna Boy singles chronology
"Pull Up" (2019)	"Be Honest" (2019)	"Own It" (2019)

Music video
- "Be Honest" on YouTube

"Be Honest" is a song by British singer Jorja Smith. It features guest vocals from Nigerian singer Burna Boy and was released as a single through FAMM Records and The Orchard on 16 August 2019. The song was written by Smith, Burna Boy and Miraa May, and produced by Cadenza, IzyBeats and Kyle Stemberger. The song samples "Rastar" by Yung Tory. Commercially, it peaked at No. 8 on the U.K. Singles Chart, becoming Smith's first and Burna Boy's second top 10 hit.

== Background ==
"Be Honest" was written by Smith, along with Burna Boy and Miraa May. Smith was inspired by the Hot Girl Summer catchphrase coined by American rapper, Megan Thee Stallion. Initially Smith planned on giving the song away to another singer, but decided on keeping it due to the contrasting tempo to her previously sombre discography. The song was produced by Izy and Cadenza who previously produced Smith's 2016 song "Where Did I Go?", from her debut album. The song features guest vocals from Nigerian singer Burna Boy, making it the duo's second collaboration following "Gum Body" from Burna Boy's album African Giant (2018). The song was released as a single to streaming and digital platforms through FAMM Records on 16 August 2019.

== Reception ==
Writing for Complex, James Keith described "Be Honest" as "An upbeat, summery outing", commenting that "the combined heat from their [Smith and Burna Boy's] intertwining vocals and the gentle bump of the production from Izy... could not be more perfect for the summer".

Upon release "Be Honest" debuted at number eighteen on the UK Singles Chart, becoming her first solo top twenty in the United Kingdom. After steadily climbing the charts the song rose to number eight, becoming Smith's first top ten.

== Music video ==
The song's accompanying video was released in conjunction with the song's release (16 August) and was directed by Amber Grace Johnson. The video follows Smith around London during a heat wave, and includes scenes of late night swimming or speeding down the street on a motorcycle. Jorja wanted to create a film that embodied the spirit of Summer, the director of the video said in a statement. "We wanted to invite the world in, to experience a different side of Jorja. Free and full of light, and some 'Hot Girl Summer' energy.' While writing in my AC-filled apartment in Brooklyn, I thought about how there's nothing quite like summers in the city. You're caught between concrete high rises, sweating from heat delirium, with our makeshift fire hydrant beaches. Yet despite it all, there's a contagious air that floods the city, and your imagination becomes infinite."

== Charts ==
=== Weekly charts ===
Chart (2019)	Peak position
Australia (ARIA)	77
Belgium (Ultratip Bubbling Under Flanders)	3
Belgium (Ultratop 50 Wallonia)	5
France (SNEP)	28
Ireland (IRMA)	20
Lithuania (AGATA)	46
New Zealand Hot Singles (RMNZ)	5
Scotland Singles (OCC)	63
Switzerland (Schweizer Hitparade)	51
UK Singles (OCC)	8
UK Indie (OCC)	2
UK Hip Hop/R&B (OCC)	7

=== Year-end charts ===
Chart (2020)	Position
Belgium (Ultratop Wallonia)	38
France (SNEP)	155

== Certifications ==
Certifications for "Be Honest"
Region	Certification	Certified units/sales
Australia (ARIA)	Platinum	70,000^{‡}
Canada (Music Canada)	Gold	40,000^{‡}
Denmark (IFPI Danmark)	Gold	45,000^{‡}
France (SNEP)	Diamond	333,333^{‡}
New Zealand (RMNZ)	Platinum	30,000^{‡}
United Kingdom (BPI)	Platinum	600,000^{‡}
^{‡} Sales+streaming figures based on certification alone.

== Release history ==
Region	Date	Format	Label
Various	16 August 2019	Digital download; streaming	FAMM
