= Forgive Me (Joel Compass song) =

Single by Joel Compass
- Released: 18 April 2014
- Length: 2:47
- Label: Polydor Records
- Songwriter(s): Joel Compass; Jayd Alexandra; Knox Brown; Dan Carey
- Producer(s): Dan Carey; Knox Brown

Joel Compass singles chronology
"Run" (2013)	"Forgive Me" (2014)	"Girlfriends" (2014)

"Forgive Me" is a song by British R&B and soul singer Joel Compass. The song was released in the United Kingdom on 18 April 2014 as a digital download. The song has peaked at number 34 on the UK Singles Chart. The song was written by Joel Compass.

== Background ==
On 4 March 2014 the song was premiered by Zane Lowe on BBC Radio 1. The song was unveiled on 5 March 2014, after the track was unveiled he tweeted: "Thank you @GeorgErgatoudis @zanelowe, I'm really excited that people are hearing the record Jx".

== Music video ==
A music video to accompany the release of "Forgive Me" was first released onto YouTube on 4 March 2014 at a total length of three minutes and one second.

== Critical reception ==
Lewis Corner of Digital Spy gave the song a positive review stating:

The British Isles can hold its head up high when it comes to its world-leading pop, rock and dance music talent dominating the mainstream. However, utter the abbreviation R&B and you'll find us glossing over it with more talk of how great Bastille and Disclosure are doing overseas. Hoping to change that fortune is rising star Joel Compass, who won over tastemakers with his lilting R&B balladry at the end of 2013 - but it seems even he has had to tap into other genres for his latest release. Teaming up with producer Dan Carey (Hot Chip, Kylie Minogue) on 'Forgive Me', Joel has added a splash of house synths and rattling percussion to his impassioned urban serenade. "When you turn and say you'll leave/ Keep your memories far from me," he warns his ex-beau, before impressively slipping into a quivering falsetto drenched in soul. The final result may have glanced to other influences to make some noise, but at its heart, it pin-points Joel Compass as one of the UK's most promising R&B prospects in years.

== Track listing ==
Digital download
No.	Title	Length
1.	"Forgive Me"	2:47

== Chart performance ==
On 23 April 2014 the song was at number 26 on The Official Chart Update in the UK. On 27 April 2014 the song entered the UK Singles Chart at number 34.

=== Weekly charts ===
Chart (2014)	Peak position
UK Hip Hop/R&B (OCC)	6
UK Singles (OCC)	34

== Release history ==
Region	Date	Format	Label
United Kingdom	18 April 2014	Digital download	Polydor Records
