= After the Storm (Kali Uchis song) =

2018 single by Kali Uchis

Single by Kali Uchis featuring Tyler, the Creator and Bootsy Collins

from the album Isolation
- Released: January 12, 2018
- Genre: Funk; neo soul; R&B
- Length: 3:27
- Label: Virgin EMI; Interscope
- Songwriters: Karly-Marina Loaiza; Matthew Tavares; Chester Hansen; Alexander Sowinski; Leland Whitty; William Earl "Bootsy" Collins; Tyler Okonma
- Producer: BadBadNotGood (Note: Pete Rock is credited as producer on the remix version)

Kali Uchis singles chronology
"Nuestro Planeta" (2017)	"After the Storm" (2018)	"Just a Stranger" (2018)

Tyler, the Creator singles chronology
"See You Again" (2017)	"After The Storm" (2018)	"Okra" (2018)

Music video
- "After the Storm" on YouTube

"After the Storm" is a song by American singer Kali Uchis featuring American rapper Tyler, the Creator and fellow American singer and bassist Bootsy Collins. It was released on January 12, 2018, by Virgin EMI Records and Interscope Records, as the third single from Uchis' debut studio album, Isolation (2018). It was written by the artists alongside production team BadBadNotGood, while the song's official remix is produced by Pete Rock.

== Background and release ==
On February 3, 2015, Uchis stated in an interview with Billboard that she wanted to work with Bootsy Collins, "I followed him on Twitter and he still hasn't followed me back, so I'm just waiting for him to follow me". Collins responded to her interview days after the publication via Twitter. Both Uchis and Collins worked on music in the latter's ranch in Ohio.

Uchis appears on Collins' song "Worth My While" from his album World Wide Funk, released in October 2017.

The single was released for digital download on January 12, 2018.

== Composition ==
"After the Storm" is a funk, neo soul, and R&B song. It features Collins singing "karma-themed ad libs" and a rap verse provided by Tyler, the Creator.

== Music video ==
The song's music video, directed by Nadia Lee Cohen, was released on January 25, 2018. The video features scenes with Tyler, the Creator as a plant, and Collins in animated form.

In a review of the clip, The Verge's Kaitlyn Tiffany describes the video as a "radically lemon-yellow ensemble". Vogue writer Rachel Hahn describes Uchis' outfit as a "bright blue lounge set fit for a '50s housewife".

== Live performances ==
On March 15, 2018, Uchis performed "After the Storm" with Tyler, the Creator and The Roots for her television debut on The Tonight Show. On April 15, 2018, Uchis performed the song during her set at Coachella with Tyler, the Creator.

== Credits and personnel ==
Credits adapted from Tidal and the liner notes of Isolation.

- Mixed and mastered at Bedrock.LA (Los Angeles, California)

Personnel

- Kali Uchis – lead vocals, background vocals, songwriting
- Tyler, The Creator – vocals, songwriting
- Bootsy Collins – vocals, songwriting
- Matthew Tavares – songwriting, fender rhodes
- Chester Hansen – songwriting, bass guitar, synthesizer
- Leland Whitty – songwriting, guitar
- Alexander Sowinski – songwriting, percussion, drums
- BadBadNotGood – production
- Pete Rock – remix production
- Jeff Ellis – mixing
- Chico Torres – mixing assistance
- Timothy Nguyen – mixing assistance
- Vic Wainstein – engineering
- Dave Kutch – mastering

== Charts ==
Chart performance for "After the Storm"
Chart (2019)	Peak position
Belgium (Ultratip Bubbling Under Flanders)	30
Belgium Urban (Ultratop Flanders)	28
New Zealand Heatseekers (RMNZ)	8
US Hot R&B Songs (Billboard)	16

== Certifications ==
Certifications for "After the Storm"
Region	Certification	Certified units/sales
Brazil (Pro-Música Brasil)	Platinum	40,000^{‡}
Canada (Music Canada)	2× Platinum	160,000^{‡}
Denmark (IFPI Danmark)	Gold	45,000^{‡}
France (SNEP)	Gold	100,000^{‡}
New Zealand (RMNZ)	2× Platinum	60,000^{‡}
United Kingdom (BPI)	Gold	400,000^{‡}
United States (RIAA)	3× Platinum	3,000,000^{‡}
^{‡} Sales+streaming figures based on certification alone.
