= Isolation (Kali Uchis album) =

Studio album by Kali Uchis
- Released: April 6, 2018
- Recorded: 2016–2017
- Studios: Whitelines (Los Angeles); Interscope (Santa Monica); Daptone's House of Soul (New York City); Harmony (Los Angeles); Red Bull (Los Angeles); Paramount (Los Angeles); Studio 13 (London); Park Street (Los Angeles)
- Genres: Alternative R&B; art pop
- Length: 46:30
- Languages: English; Spanish
- Labels: Rinse; Virgin EMI
- Producers: Autumn Rowe; BadBadNotGood; David Sitek; DJ Dahi; Gorillaz; Greg Kurstin; Jairus Mozee; Jeff Gitty; Josh Crocker; Kali Uchis; Kevin Parker; Larrance Dopson; Midas Touch; Om'Mas Keith; Romil; Sounwave; Steve Lacy; The Rude Boyz; The Wlderness; Thundercat; Two Inch Punch; Wayne Gordon

Kali Uchis chronology
Por Vida (2015)	Isolation (2018)	To Feel Alive (2020)

Singles from Isolation
- 1. "Tyrant" Released: May 22, 2017; 2. "Nuestro Planeta" Released: August 25, 2017; 3. "After the Storm" Released: January 12, 2018; 4. "Dead to Me" Released: July 26, 2018; 5. "Just a Stranger" Released: October 30, 2018

Isolation is the debut studio album by American singer Kali Uchis, released worldwide on April 6, 2018, through Rinse Recordings and Virgin EMI Records. The album was supported by five singles: "Dead to Me", "Tyrant" featuring Jorja Smith, "Nuestro Planeta" featuring Reykon, "After the Storm" featuring Tyler, the Creator and Bootsy Collins, and "Just a Stranger" featuring Steve Lacy. The album was later certified Platinum by the Recording Industry Association of America.

== Background and recording ==
Uchis intentionally avoided being influenced by "current music" or her peers while making Isolation. Although she worried that its sound might not align with contemporary trends, she embraced that sense of isolation and viewed creating music that "doesn't sound like anything else right now" as part of what makes artistry exciting. In an interview with NPR, Uchis stated that "Killer" was inspired by a toxic five-year relationship she experienced during her teenage years, as well as strained relationships with her family at the time. She recalled being "kicked out of the house" near the end of high school and described that period of her life as one in which she was "figuring everything out", though she later viewed the experience as an opportunity for personal growth.

== Music and lyrics ==
Isolation is an alternative R&B and art pop album, which combines elements of R&B (with the influences of pop), bossa nova, doo-wop, bedroom pop, soul, blues, hip-hop, funk, Brazilian jazz, and reggaeton. According to Clash, the album expands on the style of Uchis's earlier material through a "retro-futurist" sound and dreamlike atmosphere, exploring themes of survival, romance, rebellion, and self-assurance through metaphorical songwriting. A. Harmony of Exclaim! described Isolation as a "lush, sensual and eclectic" record that presents different facets of Uchis's persona, while noting her stylistic control across its genre experimentation. NME's Thomas Smith noted her assertive lyrical persona on tracks ("Dead to Me"), while also highlighting the album's stylistic variety, ranging from disco-influenced songs ("Tomorrow") to ballads ("Flight 22"). He also compared "Feel Like a Fool" to the style of Amy Winehouse.

"Nuestro Planeta", featuring vocals the performer Reykon, is a progressive R&B and Latin pop song with a reggaeton rush. The silky funk song "After the Storm" features vocals from the rapper Tyler, the Creator and singer Bootsy Collins. The A.V. Club described "Body Language" as a "Smoke-ring bossa nova" song. "Miami" is a progressive Latin pop and R&B song.

== Release and promotion ==
Uchis performed the song "After the Storm" at The Tonight Show Starring Jimmy Fallon in March 2018, and announced the album Isolation's release date—set to be released on April 6 through Interscope Records. She supported the album with her 23-date North American In Your Dreams tour which commenced on September 13, in Seattle, and ended on November 10, in Los Angeles. Gabriel Garzón-Montano and Cuco served as opening acts for the tour. Uchis expressed pride in the success of the tour, noting that she initially had no performance experience or industry connections and had begun making music "literally in my room looping samples".

== Critical reception ==
Professional ratings
Aggregate scores
Source	Rating
AnyDecentMusic?	8.3/10
Metacritic	87/100
Review scores
Source	Rating
AllMusic	5/5 stars
The A.V. Club	B+
Clash	8/10
Consequence	A−
Exclaim!	8/10
The Independent	4/5 stars
NME	5/5 stars
Pitchfork	8.6/10
Q	4/5 stars
Rolling Stone	4/5 stars

Isolation received widespread acclaim from critics. At Metacritic, which assigns a normalized rating out of 100 to reviews from mainstream publications, the album received an average score of 87, based on 17 reviews.

Ilana Kaplan of The Independent wrote that Uchis "has been largely underrated the past few years, but Isolation might just finally give her the attention she deserves". In a rave review for Paste, Madison Desler stated that "for an album that's fifteen tracks to be this consistently good is ... an artistic triumph that should place it on every Best Of list at the end of the year", concluding the album "perhaps signal[s] a legend in the making." Q critic Rupert Howe praised Uchis' "natural pop charisma and ... ability to glide effortlessly between genres". For Rolling Stone, Joe Levy praised the album as "fascinating" and simultaneously "vintage and futuristic", comparing it to the works of Beck and Outkast. In a five-star review Thomas Smith of NME commented that "miraculously, [the album] feels in no way forced: it's a joy to witness her glide into any genre and totally own it". For Exclaim!, A. Harmony scored the album an eight out of ten and wrote the album "bends genres to her will rather than allowing them to absorb her identity, making for an impressive effort that will only improve as it ages."

For Pitchfork, Julianne Escobedo Shepherd wrote that Isolation "positions her to become a new gravitational force in pop". Pitchfork also included the album at number 38 on its list of 50 best albums of 2018, with Daphne Carr writing that it "pays tribute to pop's past while making it sound new through glowing homage to black and Latinx jukebox favorites and a global roster of collaborations housed in classic soul/R&B aesthetics."

=== Accolades ===
Year-end lists
Publication	List	Rank	Ref.
GQ Russia	The 20 Best Albums of 2018	10	
Pitchfork	The 50 Best Albums of 2018	38	
NPR	The 50 Best Albums of 2018	9	
Billboard	The 50 Best Albums of 2018	16	
The Guardian	The 50 Best Albums of 2018	21	
Dazed	The 20 Best Albums of 2018	11	
Stereogum	The Best Albums of 2018	28	
Spin	51 Best Albums of 2018: Staff Picks	20	
The A.V. Club	The best pop and R&B albums of 2018	—N/a	
Exclaim!	Top 10 Soul and R&B Albums	3	

== Track listing ==
Isolation track listing
No.	Title	Writer(s)	Producer(s)	Length
1.	"Body Language" (Intro)	Kali Uchis; Stephen Bruner; Om'Mas Keith	Thundercat; Keith	2:16
2.	"Miami" (featuring Bia)	Uchis; David Andrew Sitek; Keith; Dacoury Natche; Bianca Landrau	Sitek; Keith; DJ Dahi	4:04
3.	"Just a Stranger" (featuring Steve Lacy)	Uchis; Romil Hemnani; Lacy	Romil; Lacy	2:58
4.	"Flight 22"	Uchis; Wayne Gordon; Autumn Rowe	Gordon; Uchis; Rowe	3:37
5.	"Your Teeth in My Neck"	Uchis; Afolabi Osinulu; Asa Davis; Kevin Arcilla; Kyle D. Branham	The Wlderness	3:06
6.	"Tyrant" (featuring Jorja Smith)	Uchis; Mark Spears; Smith; Larrance Dopson; Jairus Mozee	Sounwave; Dopson; Mozee	3:24
7.	"Dead to Me"	Uchis; Ben Ash	Two Inch Punch	3:20
8.	"Nuestro Planeta" (featuring Reykon)	Uchis; Bryan Chaverra; Kevin Londoño; Andrés Londoño; Martha Llorente; Jairo Torres	The Rude Boyz	3:23
9.	"In My Dreams" (featuring Gorillaz)	Uchis; Damon Albarn	Gorillaz	3:21
10.	"Gotta Get Up" (Interlude)	Uchis; Harry Rabinowitz; Dave Richmond; Harold Fisher; Martin Kershaw; Josh Crocker; Jeff Gitty	Crocker; Midas Touch; Gitty	1:53
11.	"Tomorrow"	Uchis; Kevin Parker	Parker	3:10
12.	"Coming Home" (Interlude)	Uchis; Spears; Greg Kurstin	Sounwave; Kurstin	2:40
13.	"After the Storm" (featuring Tyler, the Creator and Bootsy Collins)	Uchis; Matthew Tavares; Chester Hansen; Alexander Sowinski; Leland Whitty; William Earl "Bootsy" Collins; Tyler Okonma	BadBadNotGood	3:27
14.	"Feel Like a Fool"	Uchis; Crocker	Crocker	3:05
15.	"Killer"	Uchis; Gordon	Gordon; Keith^{[a]}	2:52
Total length:				46:30

=== Notes ===
- ^{^[a]} signifies a vocal producer.
- "Nuestro Planeta" translates to "Our Planet".
- "Gotta Get Up" contains elements of "Love in Triplicate", performed by Midas Touch.
- "After the Storm" contains an element of "Wesley's Theory", performed by Kendrick Lamar, George Clinton, and Thundercat.

== Personnel ==
=== Musicians ===
- Thundercat – bass, guitar, drums (track 1)
- David Andrew Sitek – guitar, bass (track 2)
- DJ Dahi – keyboards, programming (track 2)
- Tommy Brenneck – guitar (tracks 4, 15)
- Wayne Gordon – guitar, glockenspiel (track 4); string arrangement (tracks 4, 15)
- Nick Movshon – bass (tracks 4, 15)
- Victor Axelrod – piano (tracks 4, 15)
- Dave Guy – trumpet (tracks 4, 15)
- Neal Sugarman – tenor saxophone (tracks 4, 15)
- Cochemea Gastelum – baritone saxophone (tracks 4, 15)
- Coco Taguchi – violin (tracks 4, 15)
- Garo Yellin – cello (tracks 4, 15)
- Homer Steinweiss – drums (tracks 4, 15)
- Bosco Mann – string arrangement (tracks 4, 15)
- Asa Davis – keyboards, bass (track 5)
- Kevin Arcilla – electric guitar, bass (track 5)
- TJ Osinulu – drums (track 5)
- Sounwave – keyboards (track 6), drums (track 12), programming (tracks 6, 12)
- Larrance Dopson – keyboards, programming (track 6)
- Jairus Mozee – guitar (track 6)
- Two Inch Punch – bass, keyboards, drums, percussion, programming (track 7)
- John Foyle – synthesizers, guitars, programming (track 7)
- The Rude Boyz – keyboards, programming (track 8)
- Damon Albarn – vocals, keyboards, guitar, bass, programming, drums, percussion (track 9)
- Jeff Gitty – guitar (track 10)
- Josh Crocker – programming (tracks 10, 14), guitar, bass, keyboards, drums, percussion (track 14)
- Kevin Parker – guitar, bass, keyboards, programming, drums, percussion (track 11)
- Greg Kurstin – synthesizers, piano, Moog, Rhodes (track 12)
- Chester Hansen – synthesizers, bass (track 13)
- Matthew Tavares – Rhodes (track 13)
- Leland Whitty – guitars (track 13)
- Alexander Sowinski – drums, percussion (track 13)
- Simon Guzman – conga (track 15)

=== Technical ===
- Keith Parry – recording (tracks 1, 2, 10, 15)
- Kyle VandeKerkhoff – recording (track 3)
- Wayne Gordon – recording (track 4)
- Simon Guzman – recording (tracks 4 and 15)
- Eric Stenman – recording (tracks 5, 9, 11, 12)
- James Musshorn – recording (track 5, 6, 9, 11, 12)
- Matthew Emonson – recording (track 5)
- Todd Bergman – recording (track 6)
- Two Inch Punch – recording, mixing (track 7)
- Mavig – recording, mixing (track 8)
- Vic Wainstein – recording (track 13)
- Brandon Kelly – recording (track 14), engineering assistance (tracks 1, 2)
- Jeff Ellis – mixing (tracks 1–3, 5, 6, 9, 11–15)
- Tony Maserati – mixing (track 4)
- John Foyle – mixing (track 7)
- Timothy Nguyen – mix assistance (tracks 1–3, 5, 6, 9–15)
- Chico Torres – mix assistance (tracks 1–3, 5, 6, 9–15)
- Josh Crocker – mix assistance (tracks 14 and 15)
- Dave Kutch – mastering

== Charts ==
Chart performance
Chart (2018)	Peak position
Belgian Albums (Ultratop Flanders)	65
Belgian Albums (Ultratop Wallonia)	189
Canadian Albums (Billboard)	70
Dutch Albums (Album Top 100)	96
New Zealand Heatseeker Albums (RMNZ)	2
Spanish Albums (PROMUSICAE)	72
UK Albums (Official Charts)	62
US Billboard 200	32

== Certifications ==
Certifications and sales
Region	Certification	Certified units/sales
Canada (Music Canada)	Gold	40,000^{‡}
Denmark (IFPI Danmark)	Gold	10,000^{‡}
Mexico (AMPROFON)	Platinum	60,000^{‡}
New Zealand (RMNZ)	Platinum	15,000^{‡}
United Kingdom (BPI)	Silver	60,000^{‡}
United States (RIAA)	Platinum	1,000,000^{‡}
^{‡} Sales+streaming figures based on certification alone.

== Release history ==
Release dates and formats
Region	Date	Format	Label	Ref.
Various	April 6, 2018	CD; digital download; streaming; vinyl	Rinse; Virgin EMI	
