= Shaybo =

English Rapper and Songwriter

Laura Adeola Adegbite (born October 5, 1996), best known as Shaybo and nicknamed "The Queen of the South," is a Nigerian-born English rapper. She lived in Abuja, the capital of Nigeria, until her family moved to London when she was six. She began making music as a member of a music group when she was 14, but grew up to be a social worker. After realizing that she needed to spend her life doing what she loved most, she quit her social working job and started making music again, dedicating her days and nights to rapping.

Shaybo has released one mixtape, Queen of the South. These projects are accompanied by a host of singles including those performed by Shaybo herself as well as those featuring other singers and rappers from the US, UK, and Nigeria alike.

== Early life ==
Shaybo is originally from Nigeria and is Yoruba. While living in Nigeria, she attended boarding school in the nation's capital city, Abuja. After spending part of her childhood in Nigeria, she moved to London at the age of six. Shaybo has an older sister and three brothers. She spent a large part of her childhood in Lewisham—a borough in Southeast London. While in primary school, Shaybo often got into "trouble" which would cause her to get "excluded". Shaybo noted that her bad behavior began when she noticed that students in London got away with a lot more mischief than the students in schools back in Nigeria.

For secondary school, Adegbite attended Catford High School. During high school, Brown would often spend her free time with her friends hanging out in Catford Frontline or a local Chicken Shop. It was around this time in her life that Brown would begin her music career freestyling with her friends. By the time she was 14, she was in a music group, but that endeavor was cut short when her mother told her she had to go to college and earn a degree. After earning a degree in social work, Brown went back into music, her passion.

== Career ==
Adegbite's career ultimately started when she was fifteen years old. She freestyled with some of her good friends and music colleagues, often at Piccadilly Circus with her friends. The "Shay'bo Freestyle" was a video she made with her friends in the winter of 2011, which had gone viral. In the early years of her career. She often collaborated with artists Dumpz & Ratz, who were also her good friends. Dumpz eventually went on to play professional football.

In the famous "Shay'bo Freestyle," the artist was sending for Deedee (another rapper from Brixton, South London) who often collaborated with rapper Sneakbo. Because of Sneakbo's association with Deedee, Brown had taken the opportunity to mock him in the freestyle, by referring to herself as Shay'bo. Following this freestyle, listeners of her music continued to refer to her as Shay'bo, which is how she acquired her official stage name.

Later in high school, Brown took a break from rapping to focus on her studies. During that period, she continued to work on music intermittently and on her own accord. Within this break, Shay'bo released "Guess Who's Back" in 2013 before returning from her hiatus. Brown's hiatus lasted for another seven years after this. Brown considered this break from music beneficial because she was given room for growth. Author Journee Bernard acknowledges that "There wasn’t as much of a sustainable infrastructure in place for independent MCs in UK rap in 2013." which contributed to Brown's decision to take a break from music. Following this break, Brown's released single "Ya Dun Know" which blew up and fully announced her return to music. Shortly after, Brown released her next single "Anger" in February 2020. As Brown continued to release music, she acquired a plethora of recognition and acclaim for her unique voice and contribution to the rap scene in the UK. However, as her career began to ignite, COVID-19 began to spread rapidly, resulting in worldwide lockdowns. This ultimately disrupted any plans Brown had career-wise for that foreseeable future. Brown ultimately adjusted to the new circumstances and continued to release music. During the summer of 2020, she performed a Daily Duppy freestyle for GRMDaily and released two singles: Dobale and Come for Shay featuring Snap Capone.

Brown dropped her first mixtape in August 2021. Brown titled this mixtape, Queen of the South, after watching the series of the same name which is about a woman named Teresa Mendoza. She was inspired by the main character who, as she says, "started off naive and then she managed to overcome her pain and her trauma and become a strong woman who's very strong-willed, and who knows how to sit in a room full of men and still get her point across." The lead single off mixtape Queen of the South, "Broke Boyz (feat. DreamDoll)," was followed by the tape's other singles "Mud," "Friendly (feat. Haile)," and "My Sister (feat. Jorja Smith)."

Brown is currently signed to Black Butter Records.

== Musical style and influences ==
Shaybo uses a combination of English and Yoruba, a Nigerian language, in her music. She not only uses Yoruba as a way to add her own special twist to rap and Hip Hop culture, but she uses it as a way to connect with her Nigerian roots, Nigerian audience, and important Nigerian experiences that include how she was raised - a common way to be raised in Nigerian households.

Shaybo has cited Lil' Kim, Foxy Brown, and Nicki Minaj as her greatest musical inspirations. "I saw that women could do it," Shaybo proudly states.

Shaybo said that "[There are] a lot of angry women in the world. [There are] a lot of women that need empowerment. [There are] a lot of women that are from Nigeria that can relate to what I'm saying [in my music]" and that "[there are women] in the world that get power from what I'm saying." These values not only influence the messages in Shaybo's music, but they have kept her motivated to make music for as long as she has. Her life story is also a place of inspiration for her music. When she went away to university, it forced her to take time to reflect on her life and figure out why she is the way she is. "I was very hood-affiliated so I used to be very angry. I used to get in trouble a lot, so I just pull from experiences and the things I’ve been through. Whether that be my anger or my love situations, I just articulate myself through music."

== Personal life ==
Shaybo almost gave up music after becoming a troubled teen. "When I used to do music, I used to be, in a way, a delinquent. I used to get in trouble a lot -- into fights a lot -- but I just felt like I was misunderstood. I felt like I couldn’t articulate myself. I went into music because it’s a way of expressing how I feel," she says. Due to this trouble, her parents told her to explore other paths. Therefore, she went to university where she studied social work. After university, she helped survivors of the Grenfell Tower fire, vulnerable children, and domestic violence victims. While she was working with Grenfell Tower survivors, she was waiting for an interview when a lady had asked her, "What are you doing here? You seem like you’re destined to be a star.” This was a special moment for Brown. Though fulfilled by helping others as a social worker, Brown wanted to spend her life doing what she loved. This act of self-recognition re-ignited her musical journey.

== Discography ==
=== Mixtapes ===
- Queen of the South (20 August 2021)

=== Singles ===
- "Bonjour Cava" (feat. Miss Lafamilia) (16 August 2019)
- "Ya Dun Know" (19 September 2019)
- "Anger" (28 February 2020)
- "Dobale" (24 June 2020)
- "Come for Shay" (feat. Snap Capone) (20 August 2020)
- "Streets" (2 April 2021)
- "Broke Boyz" (feat. DreamDoll) (22 April 2021)
- "Mud" (3 June 2021)
- "Friendly" (feat. Haile) (8 July 2021)
- "Deserve the Finest (JD Sports presents)" (18 August 2021)
- "My Sister" (ft. Jorja Smith) (19 August 2021)
- "Don't Play Me" feat. NSG" (11 November 2021)
