= Blue Lights (song) =

2016 song by Jorja Smith

Single by Jorja Smith

from the album Lost & Found
- Released: 26 February 2016
- Genre: R&B; soul; trip hop
- Length: 4:10
- Label: FAMM
- Songwriters: Jorja Smith; Ben Joyce; Guy Bonnet; Roland Romanelli; Dizzee Rascal; Nicholas Detnon
- Producers: Ben Joyce; Engine Earz

Jorja Smith singles chronology
"Blue Lights" (2016)	"Where Did I Go?" (2016)

Music video
- "Blue Lights" on YouTube

"Blue Lights" is a song by English singer and songwriter Jorja Smith, released as her debut single on 26 February 2016. The song was written by Smith, Ben Joyce, Guy Bonnet, Roland Romanelli, Dizzee Rascal and Nicholas Detnon and produced by Joyce and Engine Earz. Two years later, it was included on the singer's debut studio album Lost & Found.

The song is built around a sample of "Amour, émoi... et vous" by Guy Bonnet and Roland Romanelli; the lyrics contain interpolations of Dizzee Rascal's "Sirens".

One month after Smith posted "Blue Lights" on her SoundCloud account, the song had more than 400 000 listens. That same week, it was added to the playlists of national British radios. In April 2018, Smith sang "Blue Lights" during her American late-night television debut on Jimmy Kimmel Live!.

A remixed version featuring French rapper Dosseh was released in March 2019.

== Charts ==
Chart (2018)	Peak position
Belgium (Ultratip Bubbling Under Flanders)	31
Belgium (Ultratip Bubbling Under Wallonia)	6
Belgium (Ultratip Bubbling Under)	31
Belgium (Urban)	23
France (SNEP)	128
Scottish Singles Sales (Official Charts)	50
UK Singles (Official Charts)	38
UK Independent (Official Charts)	4
UK Hip Hop/R&B (Official Charts)	20

== Certifications ==
Region	Certification	Certified units/sales
Australia (ARIA)	Gold	35,000^{‡}
France (SNEP)	Diamond	333,333^{‡}
New Zealand (RMNZ)	Platinum	30,000^{‡}
United Kingdom (BPI)	Platinum	600,000^{‡}
^{‡} Sales+streaming figures based on certification alone.

== Awards and nominations ==
Year	Awards	Category	Result	Ref.
2016	MOBO Awards	Best Song	Nominated	
2018	UK Music Video Awards	Best Urban Video – UK	Won	
2019	Ivor Novello Awards	Best Contemporary Song	Nominated	
