= Lost & Found (Jorja Smith album) =

Studio album by Jorja Smith
- Released: 8 June 2018
- Studio: Forwa3D, Red Bull, Fish Factory and The Sauna in London; King Size in Los Angeles
- Genre: R&B; soul; trip hop
- Length: 46:00
- Label: FAMM
- Producer: Cadenza; Charlie Perry; Ed Thomas; Felix Joseph; Jason Pounds; Jeff Kleinman; Joel Compass; Ben Joyce; Maaike Lebbing; Michael Uzowuru; Tom Misch; Engine Earz

Jorja Smith chronology
Project 11 (2016)	Lost & Found (2018)	Be Right Back (2021)

Singles from Lost & Found
- 1. "Blue Lights" Released: 26 February 2016; 2. "Where Did I Go?" Released: 22 May 2016; 3. "Teenage Fantasy" Released: 5 June 2017; 4. "February 3rd" Released: 24 May 2018; 5. "On Your Own" Released: 20 September 2018; 6. "The One" Released: 7 December 2018; 7. "Don't Watch Me Cry" Released: 15 February 2019; 8. "Goodbyes" Released: 10 June 2019

Lost & Found is the debut studio album by English singer Jorja Smith. It was released on 8 June 2018 by FAMM, with distribution from The Orchard. Writing and recording for the album took place over five years in London and Los Angeles. The sessions featured contributions from producers such as Jeff Kleinman, Michael Uzowuru, Tom Misch, Maaike Lebbing, among others.

Lost & Found was acclaimed by music critics, who commended its composition, style, lyrical content and Smith's vocal delivery. It was included in several year-end best album lists and was nominated for the Mercury Prize. It debuted at number three on the UK Albums Chart and number one on the UK R&B Chart. Internationally, the album performed moderately, making appearances on charts in the United States, Australia, New Zealand and Ireland. It was supported by the singles: "Blue Lights", "Where Did I Go?", "Teenage Fantasy" and "February 3rd", and has gone on to be certified Gold in the UK and France.

== Background ==
In 2015 at the age of 18, Smith moved to London and was living with her aunt and uncle, working as a Starbucks barista, spending breaks recording lyrics into Voicenotes on her phone. Her move to London inspired the album's title, as when Smith travelled to Ladbroke Grove she had a realisation that she felt lost, yet knew exactly where she wanted to be: "I feel like wherever I go I'm still quite lost, but there's a sense of 'found' in that I'm right where I want to be. Lost and found is how I feel." During college Smith was researching racial discrimination towards students, which would influence "Blue Lights". The song was released to SoundCloud in early 2016 and featured a Dizzee Rascal sample. The song was picked up by Stormzy and Skrillex upon release, and in March 2017 Smith met with Drake to record vocals for his More Life playlist.

Smith followed an unconventional style when creating the album. Smith had already written all the album's songs before she decided she wanted to release an album. Her label suggested she pick songs from a list she had already worked on and create the album from them. Unlike other albums Lost & Found has no concept and instead was a collection of songs written by Smith from the age of 16 to 21. Smith co-wrote "The One" with her boyfriend and producer Joel Compass. The night before the song was conceived Smith and Compass decided not to make their relationship official as Smith was set to go on tour to America. This led Smith and Compass to create "The One" which discusses meeting the right person at the wrong time.

== Release and promotion ==
In 2016, Smith began releasing songs online including "Blue Lights" and "Where Did I Go?". She performed unreleased tracks "The One" and "On Your Own" during her set at the 2018 Coachella Valley Music and Arts Festival on 15 April 2018 and announced the title Lost & Found through her social media accounts on 20 April 2018. That same month, she made her American late-night television debut on Jimmy Kimmel Live! with a performance of "Blue Lights".

=== Singles ===
In January 2016, Smith released her debut single "Blue Lights", which samples Dizzee Rascal's song "Sirens", on SoundCloud; the song garnered 400,000 plays on the website within a month.

On 5 June 2017, Smith released "Teenage Fantasy".

== Critical reception ==
Professional ratings
Aggregate scores
Source	Rating
AnyDecentMusic?	7.5/10
Metacritic	81/100
Review scores
Source	Rating
AllMusic	4/5 stars
Consequence of Sound	B
Exclaim!	9/10
Financial Times	4/5 stars
The Guardian	3/5 stars
NME	3/5 stars
The Observer	4/5 stars
Pitchfork	8.1/10
Q	4/5 stars
The Times	3/5 stars

Lost & Found received widespread acclaim from music critics. On Metacritic, the album received a weighted average score of 81, based on 16 reviews, indicating "universal acclaim". Ryan Patrick of Exclaim! praised the album, writing that it is "safe yet edgy, simple yet complex, ambitious yet relaxed" and a "solid start" for Smith. Lewis Lister of Clash described Lost & Found as "a brilliant first draft" while commending the album's production and stylistic blends. Ludovic Hunter-Tilney of Financial Times believed the album "comes across as thoughtful and authentic, the true measure of its success" and that it is "a composed piece of work." Simon Edwards of The Line of Best Fit described it as a "polished pop" album that is "skilfully arranged so that most music fans will be able to unearth some element that they can relate to." Leigh Sanders of Express & Star concluded that Lost & Found is "polished with a full sound, a mixture of pop and R&B that sounds intimate and delicate given her often softer approach to vocals."

Kieren Yates of The Guardian wrote that Lost & Found is "a well-paced album full of gentle vocals, catchy pop hooks and a playful relationship with the pains of youth, love and insecurity", although the "sparse and uninspiring production doesn't save the songs from feeling forgettable at times." In Variety, Jem Aswad said that the album "lingers by the exit — the last three tracks all feel like closers" but is cohesive and can appeal to different audiences.

In a mixed review, Thomas Smith of NME found the album a "drag" and that it "often relies too heavily on the jazz-tinged R&B formula", adding that "the record is far more entertaining when she deviates from the template."

=== Accolades ===
Lost & Found was nominated for a Mercury Prize, with the album being one of 12 to be shortlisted for the award.

Publication	Accolade	Rank
Blare	Blare's Top 50 Albums of 2018	13
Clash	Clash's Top 40 Albums of 2018	12
Complex UK	Complex' Top 15 Albums of 2018	10
Crack Magazine	Crack Magazine's Top 50 Albums of 2018	25
The Line of Best Fit	The Line of Best Fit's Top 50 Albums of 2018	19
PopMatters	PopMatters' Top 70 Albums of 2018	40

== Commercial performance ==
The album debuted at number three on the UK Albums Chart for the week dated 15 June 2018, selling a total of 7,390 album-equivalent units. It also debuted at number four on the UK's Official Record Store Chart, which consists of the UK's biggest albums of the week sold through 100 UK independent record shops, based on sales of CDs, vinyl and other formats. As of September 2018, the album had sold 41,983 copies in the United Kingdom. The album was later certified silver by the British Phonographic Industry for shipments of 60,000 copies.

== Track listing ==
No.	Title	Writer(s)	Producer(s)	Length
1.	"Lost & Found"	Jorja Smith; Charlie Perry	Perry	5:14
2.	"Teenage Fantasy"	Smith; Perry; Peter Meredith	Perry	3:46
3.	"Where Did I Go?"	Smith; Michael Stafford; Oliver Rodigan; Sam Wills	Cadenza	3:11
4.	"February 3rd"	Smith; Stafford; Jeff Kleinman; Michael Uzowuru; Jason Pounds	Uzowuru; Kleinman; Pounds	4:02
5.	"On Your Own"	Smith; Pounds	Pounds	4:01
6.	"The One"	Smith; Joel Compass; Ed Thomas; Maaike Lebbing; Amanda Ghost	Compass; Kito^{[a]}	3:17
7.	"Wandering Romance"	Smith; Stafford; Felix Joseph	Joseph	4:35
8.	"Blue Lights"	Smith; Ben Joyce; Guy Bonnet; Roland Romanelli; Dylan Mills; Nicholas Detnon	Joyce; Engine Earz^{[a]}	4:10
9.	"Lifeboats (Freestyle)"	Smith; Tom Misch	Misch; Engine Earz^{[a]}	2:52
10.	"Goodbyes"	Smith; Thomas		3:50
11.	"Tomorrow"	Smith; Stafford; Thomas	Thomas	3:52
12.	"Don't Watch Me Cry"	Smith	Engine Earz^{[a]}	3:10
Total length:				46:00

Notes

- ^{^[a]} signifies an additional producer

Sample credits

- "Blue Lights" contains a sample of "Amour, émoi... et vous", written and performed by Guy Bonnet and Roland Romanell; and "Sirens" written and performed by Dizzee Rascal.

== Personnel ==
Credits adapted from Tidal album liner notes.

- Jorja Smith – vocals

Production

- Charlie Perry – production (tracks 1 and 2)
- Cadenza – production (track 3)
- Michael Uzowuru – production (track 4)
- Kito – additional production (track 6), vocal production (track 6)
- Felix Joseph – production (track 7)
- Joice – production (track 8)
- Tom Misch – production (track 9)
- Ed Thomas – production (track 11)
- Engine Earz – additional production (track 8)

Technical

- Ricky Damian – engineering (tracks 1, 7, 9, and 11)
- Nitin Sawhney – programming (track 6)
- Daniel Trachtenberg – engineering (track 10)
- Antonio Feola – engineering (track 12)
- Engine Earz – mixing (all tracks), mastering (all tracks)

Instrumentation

- Charlie Perry – bass (track 1), keyboards (track 1)
- Anna Phoebe – violins (track 6)
- Mutale Chashi – bass (track 6)
- David Dyson – drums (track 5), percussion (track 6)
- Nitin Sawhney – strings (track 6), orchestration (track 6), arranger (track 6)
- Felix Joseph – synths (track 7), bass (track 7), drums (track 7)
- Michael Stafford – guitar (track 7)
- DJ Complexion – cuts (track 8)
- Benjamin Totten – guitar (tracks 10 and 11)
- Ed Thomas – bass (track 11), piano (track 11)
- Femi Koleoso – drums (track 11)
- Mike Excell – live drums (track 11)
- Amané Suganami – piano (track 12)

== Charts ==
=== Weekly charts ===
Chart (2018)	Peak position
Australian Albums (ARIA)	13
Belgian Albums (Ultratop Flanders)	12
Belgian Albums (Ultratop Wallonia)	22
Canadian Albums (Billboard)	42
Czech Albums (ČNS IFPI)	63
Danish Albums (Hitlisten)	31
Dutch Albums (Album Top 100)	12
French Albums (SNEP)	17
German Albums (Offizielle Top 100)	61
Irish Albums (IRMA)	14
Irish Independent Albums (IRMA)	1
Japanese Albums (Oricon)	125
New Zealand Albums (RMNZ)	16
Scottish Albums (OCC)	15
South Korean Albums (Gaon)	78
Swedish Albums (Sverigetopplistan)	57
Swiss Albums (Schweizer Hitparade)	9
UK Albums (OCC)	3
UK Independent Albums (OCC)	1
UK R&B Albums (OCC)	1
US Billboard 200	41
US Top R&B Albums (Billboard)	3
US Top R&B/Hip-Hop Albums (Billboard)	23

=== Year-end charts ===
Chart (2018)	Position
Belgian Albums (Ultratop Flanders)	127
Belgian Albums (Ultratop Wallonia)	199
French Albums (SNEP)	194

Chart (2019)	Position
Belgian Albums (Ultratop Flanders)	144
French Albums (SNEP)	170

Chart (2020)	Position
French Albums (SNEP)	192

== Certifications ==
Region	Certification	Certified units/sales
Denmark (IFPI Danmark)	Gold	10,000^{‡}
France (SNEP)	Platinum	100,000^{‡}
United Kingdom (BPI)	Gold	100,000^{‡}
^{‡} Sales+streaming figures based on certification alone.

== Release history ==
Album formats and release dates
Region	Date	Format	Label	Ref.
Various	8 June 2018	CD; Digital download; LP	FAMM	
Japan	4 July 2018	CD	Hostess	
Various	2 November 2018	Cassette	FAMM	

== See also ==
- List of UK R&B Albums Chart number ones of 2018
