= Falling or Flying =

2023 studio album by Jorja Smith

Studio album by Jorja Smith
- Released: 29 September 2023
- Studio: Studio 13
- Genre: R&B
- Length: 43:39
- Label: FAMM
- Producer: Blue May; DameDame*; Jodi Milliner; New Machine; P2J

Jorja Smith chronology
Be Right Back (2021)	Falling or Flying (2023)	Falling or Flying (Reimagined) (2024)

Singles from Falling or Flying
- 1. "Try Me" Released: 13 April 2023; 2. "Little Things" Released: 11 May 2023; 3. "Go Go Go" Released: 3 August 2023; 4. "Falling or Flying" Released: 30 August 2023

Falling or Flying is the second studio album by British singer Jorja Smith, released on 29 September 2023 through FAMM. The album was primarily produced by DameDame* and includes features from J Hus and Lila Iké. It marks Smith's first full-length album in five years and was preceded by the release of four singles: "Try Me", "Little Things", "Go Go Go" and "Falling or Flying".

A reimagined version of the album was released on 3 May 2024, featuring live interpretations of some of the album's tracks including "Greatest Gift", "Little Things" and "Feelings".

== Background ==
A press release stated that the album "thrillingly broaches any gap between jazz, soul, R&B and funky house", while Smith herself stated that the lyrical content "touch[es] on breakups, relationships with my friends, relationships with old friends, relationships with myself". Smith also called each song a "standstill moment". Billboard stated that in comparison to Smith's first album, Falling or Flying has Smith "stepping into womanhood" and "more sure of herself than ever before".

== Promotion ==
The album was announced on 18 May 2023. In addition to the first three singles released throughout 2023, Smith released the self-directed music video for the fourth single "Falling or Flying" on 30 August, and also released the track list at the same time.

== Critical reception ==
Professional ratings
Aggregate scores
Source	Rating
AnyDecentMusic?	7.1/10
Metacritic	74/100
Review scores
Source	Rating
DIY	4.5/5 stars
Exclaim!	6/10
Mojo	2/5 stars
MusicOMH	4/5 stars
NME	4/5 stars
Pitchfork	7.6/10

Falling or Flying received a score of 74 out of 100 on review aggregator Metacritic based on thirteen critics' reviews, indicating "generally favorable" reception. Aggregator AnyDecentMusic? gave it 7.1 out of 10, based on their assessment of the critical consensus.

Jon Pareles of The New York Times wrote that "Smith has kept her sound strictly focused. No matter how many layers are in the final mixes—and there can be plenty tucked in—the songs present themselves as minimal, with stripped-down riffs behind aching vocals. In other words, rhythms and blues". Joe Goggins of DIY called the album "compelling evidence" that Smith "made the right decision" to "take her time in crafting her comeback", writing that "this is thoughtful, nuanced R&B that demonstrates Jorja's kaleidoscopic feel for her genre".

NME's Thomas Smith compared the album to Solange's When I Get Home (2019), calling it "an uncompromising and arresting treasure of a record" as "scarcely any songs [...] sound the same, but the throughline of Smith trusting her gut remains and reconnecting with herself remains a guiding constant". Reviewing the album for MusicOMH, John Murphy opined that it "feels more authentically like Smith's real self. There's less in the way of down-tempo ballads, leaving her room to explore and develop her sound: and there seems more chance of flight than fall by the quality of her new songs". Aimee Cliff of Pitchfork felt that the "unhurried, self-possessed" album "soars when it lets loose".

Wesley McLean of Exclaim! wrote that the album "finds Smith exploring new sounds and crossing into different genres. A valiant effort, the album is sometimes hindered by this omnivorous approach, ultimately lacking the cohesion and vision of her previous release". Mojo felt that "Smith often finds herself stuck in a musical straitjacket of tired R&B tropes, rarely able to break out of a narrow comfort zone".

== Track listing ==
All lyrics are written by Jorja Smith; "Feelings" co-written by Momodou Jallow.

Falling or Flying track listing
No.	Title	Music	Producer(s)	Length
1.	"Try Me"	Jorja Smith; Barbara Boko-Hyouyhat; Edith Nelson	DameDame*	3:33
2.	"She Feels"	Smith; Boko-Hyouyhat; Nelson	DameDame*	3:12
3.	"Little Things"	Smith; Boko-Hyouyhat; Richard Isong; Adam Jordan; Nelson; Maverick Sabre	P2J; New Machine	3:24
4.	"Flights Skit"	Smith; Boko-Hyouyhat; Nelson; Momodou Jallow	DameDame*	0:17
5.	"Feelings" (featuring J Hus)	Smith; Boko-Hyouyhat; Nelson; Jallow	DameDame*	3:57
6.	"Falling or Flying"	Smith; Boko-Hyouyhat; Nelson; Isong; Marco Bernardis	DameDame*	3:24
7.	"Go Go Go"	Smith; Boko-Hyouyhat; Nelson	DameDame*	2:25
8.	"Try and Fit In"	Smith; Boko-Hyouyhat; Nelson; Sabre; New Machine	DameDame*	1:56
9.	"Greatest Gift" (featuring Lila Iké)	Smith; Boko-Hyouyhat; Nelson; Sabre; Isong; Alecia Tameka Grey	DameDame*; P2J	3:12
10.	"Broken is the Man"	Smith; Isong; Marlon Roudette; Farra Blake	P2J	2:12
11.	"Make Sense"	Smith; Boko-Hyouyhat; Nelson; Isong; Rory O'Brien	P2J	2:21
12.	"Too Many Times"	Smith; Boko-Hyouyhat; Nelson	DameDame*	2:38
13.	"Lately"	Smith; Boko-Hyouyhat; Nelson; Isong; Wesley Joseph	DameDame*	2:07
14.	"BT69 JJY"	Smith; Isong; Bernardis; O'Brien; Matthew James Roberts; Ed Thomas	P2J	0:25
15.	"Backwards"	Smith; Isong; Bernardis; O'Brien; Roberts; Thomas	P2J	3:44
16.	"What If My Heart Beats Faster?"	Smith; Blue May; Jodi Milliner	May; Milliner	4:52
Total length:				43:39

Falling or Flying deluxe edition disc 2 track listing
No.	Title	Length
1.	"Lately Remix" (featuring Craig David)
2.	"Greatest Gift" (Camp Habitat Remix)
3.	"Backwards" (Dirty Danger Remix)
4.	"Greatest Gift" (Groove Chronicles Broken Soul Refix)
5.	"Make Sense" (Todd Edwards Remix)
6.	"Little Things x Gypsy Woman" (L Beats Mashup)
7.	"Little Things" (Floating Points Remix)
8.	"Little Things" (Nia Archives Remix)

== Personnel ==
Musicians

- Jorja Smith – lead vocals (tracks 1–3, 5–13, 15, 16), background vocals (1–3, 5, 7–16)
- Barbara Boko-Hyouyhat – programming (1–11, 13), background vocals (1–3, 5–8, 12)
- Edith Nelson – programming (1–11, 13), background vocals (1, 3, 5–10, 12)
- Wesley Joseph – background vocals (2)
- Marco Bernardis – background vocals (3)
- Richard Isong – background vocals (3), programming (3, 9–11, 14, 15)
- Adam Jordan – programming (3)
- Jasmine Kayser – background vocals (7)
- Alecia Grey – lead vocals (9)
- Blue May – programming (16)
- Jodi Milliner – programming (16)
- Matt Roberts - String Arranger, Orchestrator, Conductor

Technical

- Stuart Hawkes – mastering
- Ricky Damian – mixing (all tracks), engineering (1, 3, 7, 8, 16)
- Giacomo Vianello – engineering (3, 7, 9), vocal engineering (6), engineering assistance (10)
- Blue May – engineering (16)
- Jeremy Murphy – string engineering (1, 6, 12, 14, 16)
- DameDame* – vocal engineering (1, 2, 5–7, 9–13, 15)
- Joshua Faulkner – vocal engineering (9, 16)
- Prash "Engine-Earz" Mistry – surround mix engineering
- Lavar Bullard – surround mix engineering assistance
- Lizzie Arnold – engineering assistance (8)
- Dan Martindale – engineering assistance (10)
- Ishaan Nimkar – engineering assistance (10)
- Kevin Douglas – engineering assistance (10)

== Falling or Flying (Reimagined) ==
Falling or Flying (Reimagined)

Studio album (re-recording) by Jorja Smith
- Released: May 3, 2024
- Recorded: 2023–24
- Studio: Livingston Studio 1, London
- Genre: R&B; neo soul
- Length: 27:16
- Label: FAMM
- Producer: Amane Suganami

Jorja Smith chronology
Falling or Flying (2023)	Falling or Flying (Reimagined) (2024)

Singles from Falling or Flying (Reimagined)
- 1. "Greatest Gift (Reimagined)" Released: April 19, 2024

Falling or Flying (Reimagined) is an album by British singer Jorja Smith. Released on May 3, 2024, through FAMM, the album is a stripped down re-recording of a selection of tracks from the Falling or Flying album, arranged and produced by Amane Suganami.

=== Track listing ===
All songs are produced by Amane Suganami.

Falling or Flying (Reimagined) track listing
No.	Title	Writer(s)	Length
1.	"Greatest Gift" (Reimagined)	Jorja Smith; Barbara Boko-Hyouyhat; Edith Nelson; Maverick Sabre; Richard Isong; Alecia Tameka Grey	3:59
2.	"Little Things" (Reimagined)	Smith; Boko-Hyouyhat; Isong; Adam Jordan; Nelson; Sabre	3:14
3.	"Feelings" (Reimagined)	Smith; Boko-Hyouyhat; Nelson; Momodou Jallow	3:19
4.	"Go Go Go" (Reimagined)	Smith; Boko-Hyouyhat; Nelson	2:53
5.	"Falling or Flying" (Reimagined)	Smith; Boko-Hyouyhat; Nelson; Isong; Marco Bernardis	3:30
6.	"Broken is the Man" (Reimagined)	Smith; Isong; Marlon Roudette; Farra Blake	2:43
7.	"Backwards" (Reimagined)	Smith; Isong; Bernardis; Rory O'Brien; Matthew James Roberts; Ed Thomas	3:36
8.	"Try Me" (Reimagined)	Smith; Boko-Hyouyhat; Nelson	3:58
Total length:			27:16

=== Personnel ===
Musicians

- Jorja Smith – lead vocals (all tracks)
- Amane Suganami – piano (1–6), keyboards (1–2, 5, 8)
- Thomas Fabian Totten - electric guitar (1–5, 7–8)
- Mutale Chashi - bass guitar (1–5), electric bass guitar (1–3, 5, 7), double bass (4), synthesiser (8)
- Jas Kayser – drums (1–3, 5, 7–8)
- Richie Sweet - percussion (1–3, 5, 8), drums (1–3, 5, 8)
- Alyssa Harrigan – background vocals (1–5, 8)
- Peace Oluwatobi - background vocals (1–5, 8)
- Joel Baely – background vocals (1–5, 8)

Technical

- James Mellor - engineering
- Luke Farnell - assistant engineering
- Ricky Damian – mixing (all tracks)
- Jess Camilleri - assistant mixing (all tracks)
- Stuart Hawkes – mastering

== Charts ==
Chart performance for Falling or Flying
Chart (2023)	Peak position
Australian Hip Hop/R&B Albums (ARIA)	29
Austrian Albums (Ö3 Austria)	44
Belgian Albums (Ultratop Flanders)	22
Belgian Albums (Ultratop Wallonia)	16
Dutch Albums (Album Top 100)	23
French Albums (SNEP)	14
German Albums (Offizielle Top 100)	56
New Zealand Albums (RMNZ)	33
Scottish Albums (OCC)	5
Spanish Albums (PROMUSICAE)	71
Swiss Albums (Schweizer Hitparade)	8
UK Albums (OCC)	3
UK Independent Albums (OCC)	2
UK R&B Albums (OCC)	1
