= Joel Compass =

British singer

- Origin: London, England
- Genres: R&B; soul
- Occupations: Singer, producer
- Years active: 2013–present
- Labels: Independent

Joel Compass is a British R&B and soul singer/producer. He is best known for his debut EP Astronaut, his debut single "Run", and the singles Forgive Me" and Girlfriends.

Post release, Compass dived into production working with the likes of FKA Twigs, Jorja Smith, Mabel, Aqualung, Tinashe and Lion Babe.

On 20 August 2020, Compass announced he would be returning to music as a recording artist and released a new single titled "Hypocrite".

== Discography ==
=== Extended plays ===
Title	Details
Astronaut	Released: 6 September 2013; Label: Black Butter Records; Format: Digital download, 12-inch single; Track listing: 01. "Astronaut"; 02. "F****d Up"; 03. "Kiss Love Goodbye"; 04. "Back To Me"

=== Mixtapes ===
Title	Details
Natural Habitat	Released: 9 July 2014; Label: Black Butter Records; Format: Digital download; Track listing: 01. "Silverstone"; 02. "She Wants To Know"; 03. "No Last Kiss"; 04. "Vanilla"; 05. "Smoking Rage"; 06. "Centrepiece"

=== Singles ===
Year	Single	Peak chart positions	Album
Year	Single	UK	Album
2013	"Back To Me"	—	Astronaut – EP
2013	"F****d Up"	—	Astronaut – EP
2013	"Astronaut"	—	Astronaut – EP
2013	"Run"	—	—N/a
2014	"Forgive Me"	34	—N/a
2014	"Girlfriends"	82	—N/a
"—" denotes a single that did not chart or was not released.

=== Featured singles ===
Year	Single	Peak chart positions	Artist	Album
Year	Single	UK	Artist	Album
2013	"Early Morning Champagne" (featuring Joel Compass)	—	Woz	Early Morning Champagne – EP
2014	"Tape 2 Tape" (featuring Joel Compass)	—	Aqualung	10 Futures
"—" denotes a single that did not chart or was not released.

=== Collaborations ===
- Rudimental – "Baby" featuring Joel Compass, MNEK and Sinead Harnett ( Live at BBC Maida Vale 2012 )
- Last Night In Paris – "So Very" featuring Joel Compass ( Roses+ 2013 )
- Woz – "Early Morning Champagne" featuring Joel Compass ( Early Morning Champagne – EP 2013 )
- Gorgon City – "Here For You (Joel Compass Remix)" ( Here For You ft. Laura Welsh Remixes – EP 2014 )
- FKA twigs – "Kicks" ( LP1 2014 )
- Aqualung – "Tape 2 Tape" featuring Joel Compass ( 10 Futures 2015 )
- Cheryl – "Coming Up For Air" featuring Joel Compass ( Only Human 2014 )
- LuvBug – "Revive (Say Something) (Original)" featuring Joel Compass ( 2015 )
- MO – "Preach" ( 2015 )
- Laura Welsh – "Soft Control" ( Soft Control 2015 )
- LION BABE – "Wonder Woman (Joel Compass Remix)" ( Wonder Woman Remixes – EP 2015 )
- FKA twigs – "In Time" ( M3LL155X 2015 )
- Soultech – "Collide" featuring Joel Compass ( 2015 )
- Charlene Soraia – "I'll Be There" ( Love Is The Law 2015 )
- Seal – "Monascow" ( 7 2015 )
- Songbirds – "Sun Goes Down" ( Music from and inspired by the film Kill Your Friends 2015 )
- LION BABE – "Whole", "Impossible", "On The Rocks" ( Begin 2016 )
- Rejjie Snow – "Keep Your Head Up" featuring Joel Compass ( 2016 )
- LION BABE – "Endless Summer", "Tina Turner", "Silver Cheetah" ( Sun Joint 2016 )
- Tinashe – "Touch Pass" ( Nightride 2016 )
- Shift K3Y – "Forever" ( NIT3 TALES 2016 )
- Beverley Knight – "Marvellous Party" ( The Halcyon Original Music from the Television Series 2017 )
- Jamie Cullum – "Forever", "Invincible" ( The Halcyon Original Music from the Television Series 2017 )
- Henri – "Sunshine Of Your Love" ( 2017 )
- Mabel – "Weapon" ( Ivy to Roses 2017 )
- Tinashe – "Fires And Flames" ( Joyride 2018 )
- Queen Naija – "Bad Boy" ( Queen Naija 2018 )
- Jorja Smith – "On Your Own", "The One" ( Lost & Found 2018 )
- Snoh Aalegra – "You" ( Ugh, Those Feels Again 2019 )
- Jorja Smith – "Addicted", "Digging", "Weekend" (Be Right Back 2021)
