= Jorja Smith =

British singer and songwriter (born 1997)

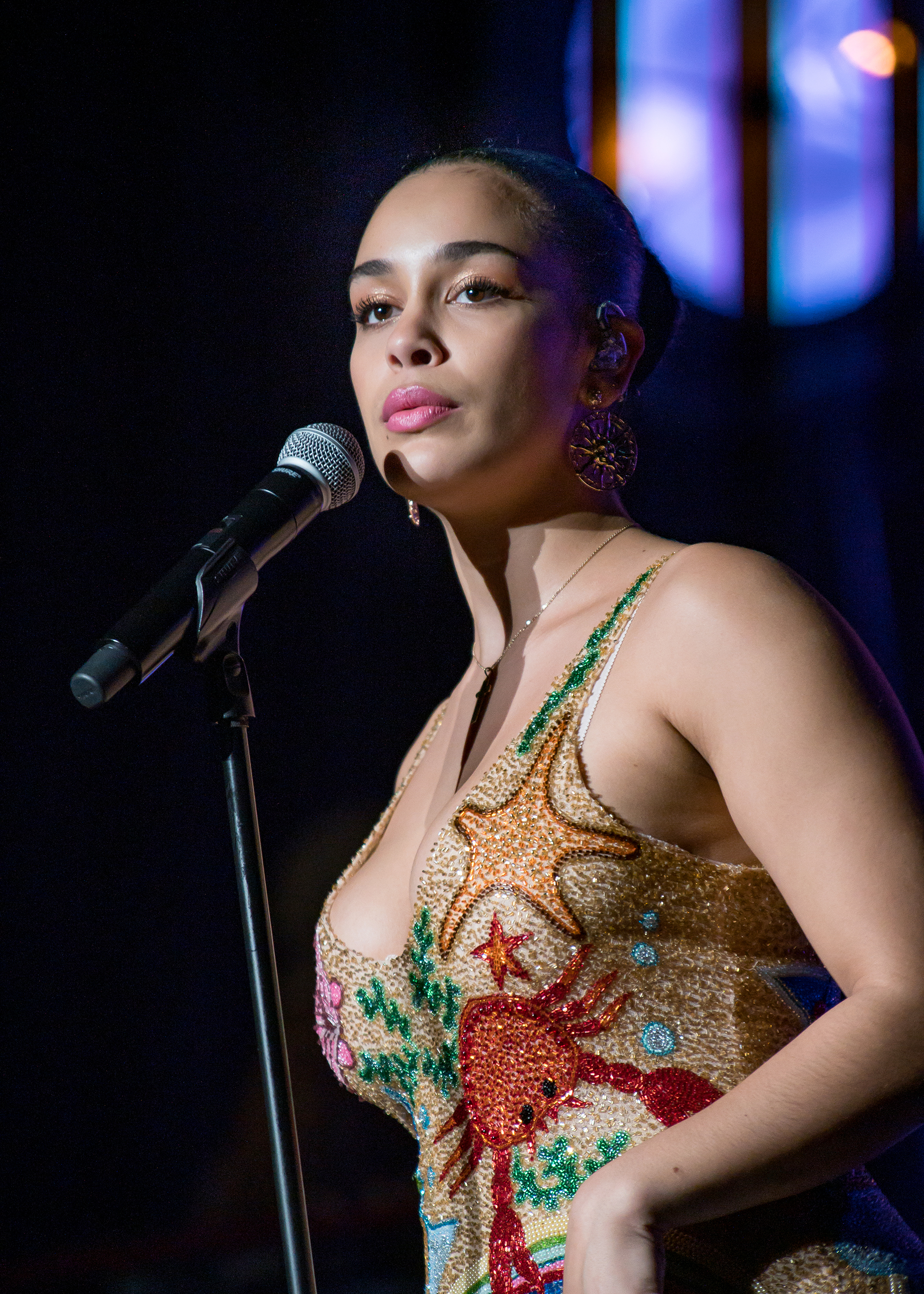
- Smith performing in 2018
- Born: Jorja Alice Smith; 11 June 1997 (age 29); Walsall, West Midlands, England, UK
- Occupations: Singer; songwriter
- Years active: 2016–present
- Works: Discography
- Musical career
- Genres: R&B; pop; hip-hop; grime; UK garage
- Labels: FAMM; Sony/ATV
- Website: jorjasmith.com

Jorja Alice Smith (born 11 June 1997) is an English singer and songwriter. Born and raised in Walsall, West Midlands, she has been writing songs since the age of 11. In 2012, Smith's friend uploaded her cover of Labrinth's "Earthquake" to YouTube, which led to her discovery by record producer Guy Moot. After her first two singles received broader recognition, she signed with Sony/ATV in early 2016, releasing two EPs throughout later that year and into 2017.

Her debut studio album, Lost & Found, was released in 2018 to critical acclaim, and peaked at number three on the UK Albums Chart. The same year, Smith won the Brit Critics' Choice Award. In 2019, she was named Best British Female Artist at the Brit Awards and was also nominated for the Grammy Award for Best New Artist. Her third EP Be Right Back, which was released in May 2021, received favourable reviews.

== Early life ==
Jorja Smith was born on 11 June 1997 in Walsall, West Midlands, to a Jamaican father and an English mother. Her father, Peter, a benefits officer, is a former musician who sang in a neo-soul group called 2nd Naicha before Smith was born; her mother, Jolene, is a jewellery designer. Smith has a younger brother, Luca, and is the cousin of football player Kemar Roofe. She is related to the artist FKA Twigs as cousins through their paternal side.

She began taking piano lessons at the age of 8 at the encouragement of her father. Smith earned a music scholarship at Aldridge School, where she learned the oboe and studied classical singing, before taking music for her A-level exams. She was scouted by a manager at the age of 15 after uploading videos of herself singing cover songs on YouTube. Shortly after, she began travelling to London for writing sessions with Maverick Sabre and Ed Thomas, while still in school. After graduation, she moved to London at the age of 18 where she supported herself by working as a barista, and continued to write songs.

== Career ==
=== 2015–2019: First EPs, and Lost & Found ===
In Late 2015, Maverick Sabre co-signed Smith publicly. In January 2016, Smith released her debut single "Blue Lights", which samples Dizzee Rascal's song "Sirens", on SoundCloud; the song garnered 400,000 plays on the website within a month. Her second single "Where Did I Go?", released in May, was singled out by Drake as his favourite track of the moment in Entertainment Weekly in July. Following the worldwide recognition and exposure Smith gained from Drake, Smith caught the attention of Guy Moot. Moot, an executive and worldwide creative at Sony/ATV with mainstream industry connections, signed Smith to a publishing deal in late 2016. In November 2016, she released her four-track debut extended play, Project 11. The same month, Smith was selected as one of the fifteen rising acts on BBC Music's Sound of 2017 longlist, and finished fourth on the list.

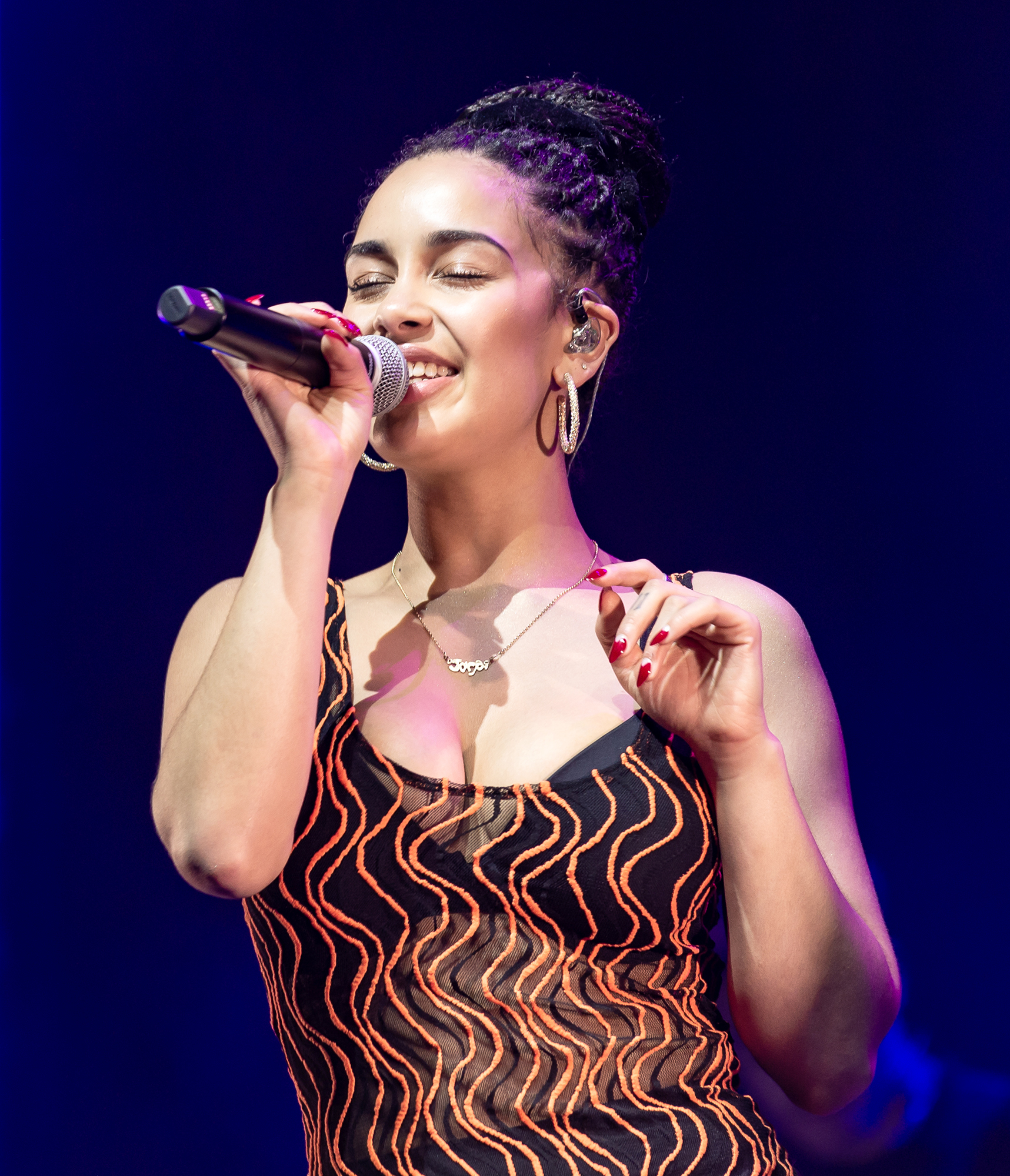
Smith performing in 2018

Smith performed as a special guest on Drake's Boy Meets World Tour in February and March 2017, and featured on two tracks on his mixtape More Life (2017). She released the song "Beautiful Little Fools" on International Women's Day; the title is a reference to the novel The Great Gatsby. In May, she featured on Kali Uchis' song "Tyrant", the lead single off Uchis' debut studio album Isolation (2018). She released her third single, "Teenage Fantasy", in June. Two months later, Smith and grime artist Preditah released a single together called "On My Mind". In September 2017, she began dating singer and producer Joel Compass.

She performed as the opening act on Bruno Mars' 24K Magic World Tour in October and November 2017. In December, it was announced that Smith would be the recipient of the Brit Critics' Choice Award, to be presented at the Brits nominations launch on 13 January 2018. She is the first independent artist to have been nominated for the award, let alone win.

In January 2018, she released the single "Let Me Down" featuring rapper Stormzy. Smith co-wrote and performed the song "I Am" on Kendrick Lamar's soundtrack album for the film Black Panther, released in February. Later that month, she performed at the BRIT Awards with Rag'n'Bone Man. In April, she made her US television debut on Jimmy Kimmel Live! with a performance of "Blue Lights". Her debut studio album, Lost & Found, written over a five-year period, was announced in April and released in June 2018 to critical acclaim. In the month of the album's release, Smith began touring in support of the album, with dates scheduled across Europe and festival appearances in Japan. The Lost & Found Tour's North American leg began on 19 November in Seattle and conclude on 19 December in Toronto, Canada and will be supported by Ravyn Lenae.

In 2019, Smith announced a co-headlining North American tour with Kali Uchis starting on 28 April in Washington, D.C. and concluding in Toronto on 30 May. In August 2019, Smith released the single "Be Honest" featuring Burna Boy.

=== 2020–present: Be Right Back, Falling or Flying and What Are the Odds ===
In early 2020, Smith began hosting a 12-part BBC Radio 3 show called 'Tearjerker', which focuses on the healing power of music. She released two singles that year: "By Any Means" and "Come Over" featuring Popcaan.

On 14 May 2021, she released her third extended play Be Right Back, which received generally positive reviews.

On 11 May 2023, Smith released the single "Little Things" which peaked at number 95 on the UK Singles Downloads Chart Top 100 on 19 May 2023. On 18 May 2023, Smith announced that her next studio album, Falling or Flying, would be released in September 2023. On 4 August 2023, Smith released "Go Go Go", the third single from her upcoming album. On 9 November 2023, Smith released a cover version of East-17's 1994 single "Stay Another Day", released solely as part of the Amazon Music Originals series.

On 12 February 2025, Smith and rapper AJ Tracey released the single "Crush", which heavily samples American singer Brandy's 2002 Full Moon album track "Love Wouldn't Count Me Out".

On 11 April 2026, she was the musical guest of the fourth episode of Saturday Night Live UK, hosted by Jack Whitehall, where she performed "Little Things" and "Price of It All".

On 3 July 2026, Smith announced her third studio album, What Are the Odds and released the single "Alive" featuring Wizkid.

Smith peformed at the 70th Ballon D'or ceremony at the London Palladium on 26 October 2026, where she sang her debut single "Blue Lights".

=== Copyright dispute of AI-generated vocals ===
Jorja Smith’s record label, FAMM, is seeking royalties from the viral song "I Run" by British dance act Haven, claiming it was created using an AI-generated "clone" of Smith's voice. The track, which gained popularity on TikTok, was initially removed from streaming platforms over copyright concerns. Haven producers admit they used AI software to modify vocals, claiming the original recordings were their own, but Smith's label argues that AI-generated material may have used her vocals without permission.

== Influences ==
Smith grew up listening to reggae, punk, hip-hop, and R&B, and wrote her first song at the age of 11. She describes being "obsessed" with Amy Winehouse's 2003 debut album Frank as a teenager and was inspired by the singer's raw approach to songwriting. Smith said her songs are about social issues: "When things are going on in the world, I think it's important to touch on them, because as a musician, you can make people listen. As soon as people press play, you've got their attention." She cites Lauryn Hill, Adele, Amy Winehouse, India Arie, Sade, Nina Simone, Alicia Keys, Mos Def and the Streets as influences. Style wise, Smith cites Rihanna as a fashion icon she is inspired by.

== Discography ==
- Lost & Found (2018)
- Falling or Flying (2023)
- What Are the Odds (2026)

== Tours ==
=== Headlining ===
- Lost & Found Tour (2018)
- Falling or Flying Tour (2024-2025)

=== Co-headlining ===
- The Kali & Jorja Tour (with Kali Uchis) (2019)

== Awards and nominations ==
Award	Year	Category	Nominated work	Result	Ref.
AIM Independent Music Awards	2018	UK Breakthrough of the Year	Herself	Won	
AIM Independent Music Awards	2018	Most Played New Independent Act	Herself	Nominated	
AIM Independent Music Awards	2018	Independent Album of the Year	Lost & Found	Nominated	
AIM Independent Music Awards	2019	Most Played New Independent Artist	Herself	Nominated	
BET Awards	2017	International Viewers' Choice Award	Herself	Nominated	
British Short Film Awards	2021	Best Music Video	"Home"	Won	
Brit Awards	2018	Critics' Choice	Herself	Won	
Brit Awards	2019	British Album of the Year	Lost & Found	Nominated	
Brit Awards	2019	British Female Solo Artist	Herself	Won	
Brit Awards	2019	British Breakthrough Act	Herself	Nominated	
Brit Awards	2024	British R&B Act	Herself	Nominated	
Brit Awards	2025	British R&B Act	Herself	Nominated	
Sweden GAFFA Awards	2019	Best Foreign New Act	Herself	Nominated	
Grammy Awards	2019	Best New Artist	Herself	Nominated	
Ivor Novello Awards	2019	Best Contemporary Song	"Blue Lights"	Nominated	
Mercury Prize	2018	Album of the Year	Lost & Found	Nominated	
MOBO Awards	2016	Best Song	"Blue Lights"	Nominated	
MOBO Awards	2017	Best Female	Herself	Nominated	
MOBO Awards	2017	Best Newcomer	Herself	Nominated	
MOBO Awards	2017	Best R&B/Soul Act	Herself	Nominated	
MOBO Awards	2021	Best Soul/R&B Act	Herself	Nominated	
MOBO Awards	2023	Best Female Act	Herself	Nominated	
MOBO Awards	2023	Song of the Year	"Little Things"	Nominated	
MOBO Awards	2025	Best Female Act	Herself	Nominated	
MOBO Awards	2025	Best R&B/Soul Act	Herself	Nominated	
MOBO Awards	2025	Album of the Year	Falling or Flying	Nominated	
MTV Europe Music Awards	2018	Best Push	Herself	Nominated	
Q Awards	2018	Breakthrough Act	Herself	Nominated	
Soul Train Music Awards	2018	Best New Artist	Herself	Nominated	
Soul Train Music Awards	2018	Soul Train Certified Award	Herself	Nominated	
Urban Music Awards	2018	Best Album	Lost & Found	Nominated	
UK Music Video Awards	2018	Best Urban Video – UK	"Blue Lights"	Won	
UK Music Video Awards	2019	Best Urban Video – UK	"Be Honest"	Nominated	
UK Music Video Awards	2019	Best Production Design in a Video	"Be Honest"	Nominated	
UK Music Video Awards	2020	Best R&B/Soul Video - UK	"By Any Means"	Nominated	
UK Music Video Awards	2020	Best Editing in a Video	"By Any Means"	Nominated	
UK Music Video Awards	2020	Best Animation in a Video	"Come Over"	Nominated	
UK Music Video Awards	2021	Best R&B/Soul Video - UK	"Bussdown" (featuring Shaybo)	Nominated	
UK Music Video Awards	2021	Best R&B/Soul Video - UK	"Patience"	Nominated	
UK Music Video Awards	2023	Best R&B/Soul Video - UK	"Try Me"	Won	
UK Music Video Awards	2025	Best Dance / Electronic Video – Newcomer	"With You"	Nominated	
