= Y Que Fue? =

2020 single by Don Miguelo

Single by Don Miguelo
- Language: Spanish
- English title: "And What Happened?"
- Released: July 29, 2020
- Genre: Latin urban; dembow
- Length: 2:43
- Label: EMDP Music
- Songwriter: Miguel Ángel Valerio
- Producer: Valerio

Don Miguelo singles chronology
"La Piedra" (2020)	"Y Que Fue?" (2020)	"La Boda" (2020)

Music video
- "Y Que Fue?" on YouTube

"Y Que Fue?" (Spanish: [i ˈke fwe]; transl. "And What Happened?") is a song by Dominican artist Don Miguelo. It was released on July 28, 2020, through EMDP Music. A dembow and latin urban track, it gained initial traction upon release and experienced a massive global resurgence in 2026.

== Background and composition ==
"Y Que Fue?" was written and produced by Don Miguelo. The lyrics are built around a repetitive chorus, and is categorized within the latin urban and Dominican dembow genre, utilizing mambo-influenced patterns. The song's origins date back to 2020 at the height of the COVID-19 pandemic. During one of his live streams, Don Miguelo popularized the phrase "¿Y qué fue? ¡No hiciste na’!", a response that sparked a viral challenge and, subsequently, the recording of the track.

== Commercial performance ==
"Y Que Fue?" achieved significant virality on the video-sharing platform TikTok. By mid-2026, the audio had been used in over 30.8 million videos, generating a cumulative 51.9 billion views across the application. On music streaming services, the single accumulated over 352 million streams on Spotify, while its official video and audio uploads on YouTube surpassed 179 million views.

In July 2026, the song received major international media coverage after Spanish footballer Lamine Yamal selected it as his official celebration track. During the Spanish national football team's victory parade for the 2026 FIFA World Cup at the Plaza de Cibeles in Madrid, Yamal entered the stage dancing to the song. This public appearance was widely circulated online and directly contributed to the viral resurgence six years after its initial release. The song later debuted on the Billboard Global 200 chart at number 148. During the first week of August 2026, it rose to number 95, officially entering the top 100.

== Charts ==
Chart performance for "Y Que Fue?"
Chart (2025–2026)	Peak position
Austria (Ö3 Austria Top 40)	42
France (SNEP)	31
Global 200 (Billboard)	95
Greece International (IFPI)	18
India International (IMI)	12
Italy (FIMI)	80
Luxembourg (Billboard)	17
Netherlands (Single Top 100)	81
Portugal (AFP)	24
Spain (Promusicae)	60
Sweden Heatseeker (Sverigetopplistan)	10
Switzerland (Schweizer Hitparade)	23
US Hot Latin Songs (Billboard)	12

== Certifications ==
Certifications for "Y Que Fue?"
Region	Certification	Certified units/sales
France (SNEP)	Platinum	200,000^{‡}
Spain (Promusicae)	Platinum	100,000^{‡}
United States (RIAA)	Platinum (Latin)	60,000^{‡}
Streaming
Greece (IFPI Greece)	Gold	1,000,000^{†}
^{‡} Sales+streaming figures based on certification alone.^{†} Streaming-only figures based on certification alone.

== Release history ==
Release dates and formats for "Y Que Fue?"
Region	Date	Format(s)	Version	Label	Ref.
Various	July 29, 2020	Digital download; streaming	Original	EMDP Music	
Various	September 10, 2020	Digital download; streaming	Lamaskeproduce remix	Self-released	
