= El Alfa =

Dominican rapper (born 1990)

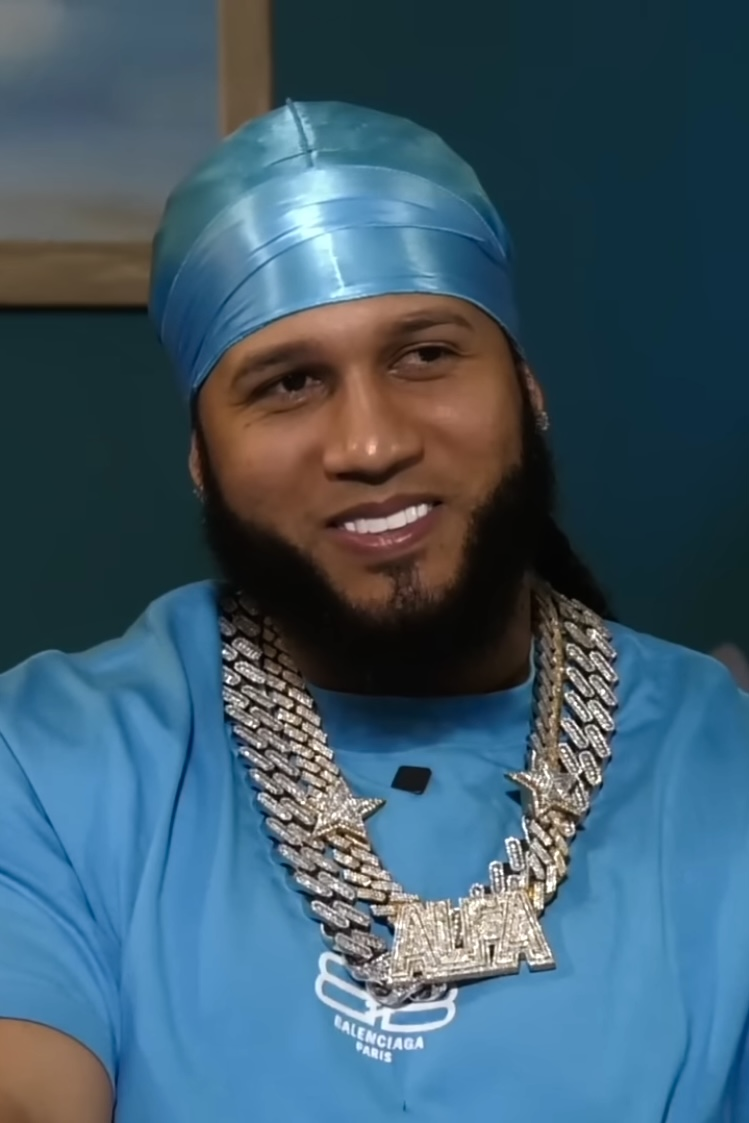
- El Alfa in 2023

Background information
- Also known as: El Alfa "El Jefe"
- Born: Emanuel Herrera Batista; 18 December 1990 (age 35); Bajos de Haina, Dominican Republic
- Genres: Dominican dembow, Latin hip hop
- Occupation: Rapper
- Years active: 2008–present
- Label: El Jefe Records
- Awards: Heat Latin Music Awards Premio Lo Nuestro

Emanuel Herrera Batista (born 18 December 1990), known professionally as El Alfa (Spanish for 'The Alpha') or El Alfa El Jefe (Spanish for 'The Alpha the Boss'), is a Dominican rapper, known as the King of Dembow. Batista was born in Bajos de Haina, San Cristobal. He is known for his initial afro hairstyle which led him to popularity in the early 2010s through songs like "Tarzan", "Coche Bomba" and "Muevete Jevi". He went on to form relationships with many artists from Puerto Rico, such as Bad Bunny, Nicky Jam, Farruko, and Myke Towers among others. This resulted in one of the biggest collaborations in dembow history, led by El Alfa, when he released "Suave (Remix)" in December 2018 alongside Chencho Corleone, Bryant Myers, Miky Woodz, Jon Z and Noriel.

El Alfa has collaborated with international stars like Cardi B, J Balvin, Pitbull, Tyga, and Black Eyed Peas. "Singapur" surpassed the 200 million mark in February 2021.

With more than 21,000,000 monthly listeners to his music on Spotify and ranked #261 in the world, El Alfa is considered the leader of the Dominican dembow genre.

== Career ==
=== 2008–2013: Career beginnings and Dembow Exitos ===
Batista became independent from his family at the age of 17. As a child, he dreamed of becoming a barber. His musical career began in 2008, when he formed a duo with Eddy Wilson, another Dominican dembow artist. In their short stint together, they released street-style dembow songs such as "El Fogon" and "Conmigo No". The duo broke up in 2009 and continued their careers as solo artists.

Batista's first release as a solo artist was "Coche Bomba" in 2009. He followed with "Coco Mordan" in 2010. In 2011, he found relative success with two songs, "No Wiri Wiri" and "Agarrate Que Te Solté". In 2012 he released "Cacao", "Con To' Lo' Cascabeles", and "Muevete Jevi". In 2013, he released his first full-length album, Dembow Exitos. The album also featured production and contributions from Nico Clinico, Bubloy, El Kable, and fellow Dominican artist Chimbala.

El Alfa's popularity continued to rise when he released "Fuin Fuan" in April 2013, continuing his style of high-paced dembow with DJ Patio's productions. That year, he performed "Humo Excúsame (Remix)" with Musicologo the Libro and "Tú Me Gusta Pila" with Farruko.

=== 2014–2016: Regional growth, national controversy, and Dembow Exitos 2.0 ===
The success of his music in the early 2010s launched him into regional stardom, and he began to record with Jowell & Randy, Nicky Jam, Tempo, and Arcángel from Puerto Rico's Reggaeton industry. In 2014, El Alfa released his biggest track to date, "Tarzan," which describes his sexual relations with a woman who 'screams like Tarzan'. "Tarzan" formed part of Dembow Exitos 2.0, El Alfa's second album. Once again, Bubloy produced the album alongside DJ Plano.

In 2015, after receiving criticism for insulting the founding fathers of the Dominican Republic in a music video, El Alfa was sentenced to 15 days of community service. The President of El Instituto Duartino, Cesar Romero called for the boycott and destruction of El Alfa's albums for having disrespected the founding fathers. Part of El Alfa's sentencing was to clean the Plaza de la Bandera, and to sing the national anthem for two hours for 15 consecutive days. Additionally, El Alfa was ordered to hand out educational pamphlets about the founding fathers at traffic lights in Santo Domingo. He considered the situation a misunderstanding.

During this period he collaborated with a number of Dominican artists: Don Miguelo, Shelow Shaq, Quimico Ultra Mega, El Mega, Nfasis, and El Super Nuevo. The biggest success of that year would be "Pal de Velitas" with Mark B, a song produced by Chael Produciendo that surpassed 20 million views on YouTube.

Chael produced two songs for El Alfa in 2016, "No Hay Forma" and "Segueta (Remix)" ft. Nicky Jam. Alongside him, El Alfa began to excel in a sub-genre of Dembow called "TrapBow", which is a mix between American trap and Dembow. He went on to record "Nadie Como Tú" with Nicky Jam and "Una Papi Que La Mima" with Tempo and Farruko before the end of the year. El Alfa toured Europe for the first time in 2016 after a promising 2015 in the United States.

=== 2017–2024: Disciplina and Sagitario ===
El Alfa celebrated his 10-year career with a concert at Palacio de los Deportes Virgilio Travieso Soto on 3 September 2018, being the first Latin urban artist to headline that venue. He has since collaborated with Anuel AA, Bad Bunny, and Nicky Jam.

In November 2018, El Alfa released "Mi Mami" featuring Cardi B.

In April 2021, El Alfa released "La Mamá De La Mamá" featuring CJ, El Cherry Scom & Chael Produciendo, under his own record label "El Jefe Record" and published by Solo E Group, RM Music Publishing and Warner Chappell under BMI Broadcast Music. In May 2021 "La Mamá De La Mamá" debuted in the Global Top 200 on the Billboard. In July 2021, El Alfa released "La Mamá De La Mamá (Remix)" featuring Busta Rhymes, Anitta, CJ, Wisin & El Cherry Scom.

In August 2021, El Alfa announced his first-ever world tour, beginning in the U.S. in the fall of 2021.

His fifth studio album, Sagitario, was released in 2022. La Leyenda del Dembow World Tour was his first arena tour in the United States, from October 2023 through December 2023.

== Personal life ==
Emanuel Herrera Batista was born in Santo Domingo Oeste, Dominican Republic. In 2021, he married Alba Rosa, his partner of seventeen years and the mother of his two children. He and his family currently live in Miami.

== Awards and nominations ==
In 2022, El Alfa received two nominations for Premio Lo Nuestro: Male Revelation Artist and Best Tropical Song Of The Year.

== Discography ==
=== Studio albums ===
Title	Album details	Peak chart positions		
Title	Album details	US Latin	US Latin Rhythm	SPA
Disciplina	Released: 11 August 2017; Label: El Jefe; Formats: CD, digital download, streaming	45	11	—
El Hombre	Released: 2 November 2018; Label: El Jefe; Formats: CD, digital download, streaming	7	6	—
El Androide	Released: 15 May 2020; Label: El Jefe; Formats: Digital download, streaming	9	6	21
Sabiduria	Released: 7 April 2022; Label: El Jefe; Formats: Digital download, streaming	16	11	—
Sagitario	Released: 22 November 2022; Label: El Jefe; Formats: Digital download, streaming	28	11	—
El Rey del Dembow	Released: 10 November 2023; Label: El Jefe; Formats: Digital download, streaming	17	8	94
Hasta Luego (Vol. 1)	Released: 18 December 2025; Label: One Billion Records; Formats: Digital download, streaming	—	—	—
Adios	Released: 30 March 2026; Label: One Billion Records; Formats: Digital download, streaming	—	—	—
"—" denotes releases that did not chart.

=== Compilation albums ===
Title	Album details	Peak chart positions	
Title	Album details	US Latin	US Latin Rhythm
Disciplina (Puerto Rico Edition)	Released: 9 February 2018; Label: El Jefe; Formats: Digital download, streaming	—	—
Dembow Worldwide Hits Teteo 42	Released: 24 June 2023; Label: El Jefe; Formats: Digital download, streaming	11	6
El Postre (En Vivo)	Released: 30 June 2026; Label: One Billion Records; Formats: Digital download, streaming	—	—
"—" denotes releases that did not chart.

=== Extended plays ===
Title	Album details
Dembo$$	Released: 2 August 2019; Label: El Jefe; Formats: Digital download, streaming

=== Singles ===
==== As lead artist ====
List of singles with selected charts, certifications and album
Title	Year	Peak chart positions					Certifications	Album
Title	Year	ARG	SPA	US	US Latin	US Dance	Certifications	Album
"Dema Ga Ge Gi Go Gu" (with Bad Bunny)	2016	—	—	—	—	—	RIAA: Platinum (Latin)	Non-album singles
"Banda de Camión" (Remix) (with Farruko and De La Ghetto featuring Zion, Bryant Myers, Villano Sam and Noriel)	2017	—	—	—	—	—	RIAA: Gold (Latin)	Non-album singles
"Suave"	2017	—	—	—	—	—	RIAA: Gold (Latin)	Non-album singles
"Lo Que Yo Diga" ("Dema Ga Ge Gi Go Gu" Remix) (featuring Farruko, Jon Z, and Miky Woodz)	2018	—	—	—	—	—	RIAA: Platinum (Latin)	El Hombre
"Ruleta" (with Yomel El Meloso)	2018	—	—	—	—	—		Fue el Hombre Que Dijo
"Siéntate en Ese Deo"	2018	—	—	—	—	—	RIAA: Platinum (Latin)	El Hombre
"Con Silenciador" (with Anuel AA)	2018	—	—	—	—	—	RIAA: Gold (Latin)	El Hombre
"Suave" (Remix) (featuring Chencho Corleone, Noriel, Miky Woodz, Jon Z & Bryant Myers)	2018	—	—	—	—	—	RIAA: Platinum (Latin)	Non-album single
"Tecnobow" (featuring Diplo)	2019	—	—	—	—	—		Dembo$$ and El Androide
"Imaginate" (with Tito el Bambino and Pitbull)	2019	—	—	—	—	—		Non-album single
"Coronao Now" (featuring Lil Pump)	2019	—	82	—	30	—		El Androide
"Mera Woo" (with Chael Produciendo)	2019	—	—	—	—	—		El Androide
"Coronao Now" (Remix) (with Sech and Myke Towers featuring Vin Diesel and Lil Pump)	2020	—	61	—	—	—		Non-album singles
"4K" (with Darell and Noriel)	2020	13	66	—	—	—		Non-album singles
"Pam" (with Justin Quiles and Daddy Yankee)	2020	26	1	—	14	—	PROMUSICAE: 2× Platinum; RIAA: 5× Platinum (Latin)	La Última Promesa
"A Correr Los Lakers" (Remix) (with Ozuna and Nicky Jam featuring Arcángel and Secreto "El Famoso Biberón")	2020	—	—	—	—	—	PROMUSICAE: Gold	Non-album single
"Wow" (Remix) (with Bryant Myers and Nicky Jam featuring Arcángel and Darell)	2020	—	—	—	36	—	RIAA: Gold (Latin)	Bendecido
"Bebé" (with Camilo)	2020	4	9	—	22	—	AMPROFON: Platinum+Gold; PROMUSICAE: 3× Platinum; RIAA: 5× Platinum (Latin)	Mis Manos
"Singapur" (Remix) (with Farruko and Myke Towers featuring Chencho Corleone and Justin Quiles)	2020	38	45	—	46	—		Non-album single
"XOXA" (with Farruko)	2021	—	—	—	47	—		Premium
"Arrebatao" (with Chael Produciendo)	2021	—	—	—	—	—		Dembow Worldwide Hits Teteo 42
"La Mamá de la Mamá" (with CJ and Chael Produciendo featuring Cherry Scom)	2021	—	81	— (Note: "La Mamá de la Mamá" did not enter the Billboard Hot 100, but peaked at number 23 on the Bubbling Under Hot 100 chart.)	9	—		Dembow Worldwide Hits Teteo 42
"Acuetate" (with Chael Produciendo and Yomel El Meloso featuring Tivi Gunz, Haraca Kiko, Capitán Aloo, El Fother and Kiko el Crazy)	2021	—	—	—	—	—		Non-album single
"Pikete" (with Nicky Jam)	2021	—	—	—	32	—		Infinity
"Fulanito" (with Becky G)	2021	61	9	—	24	—	AMPROFON: Gold; PROMUSICAE: 2× Platinum; RIAA: 3× Platinum (Latin)	Esquemas
"Curazao" (with Farruko)	2021	—	—	—	34	—		Dembow Worldwide Hits Teteo 42
"Happy Birthday" (with Tempo)	2021	—	—	—	—	22		Non-album single
"Gogo Dance"	2022	—	—	—	26	—		Sabiduria
"Simply the Best" (with Black Eyed Peas and Anitta)	2022	—	—	—	—	30		Elevation
"Le Doy 20 Mil" (with Prince Royce)	2023	—	—	—	—	—		Non-album single
"Plebada" (with Peso Pluma)	2023	—	—	68	12	—		Dembow Worldwide Hits Teteo 42
"Tonight" (with Black Eyed Peas featuring Becky G)	2024	—	—	—	—	32		Ride or Die
"BUKELE"	2024	—	—	—	—	—		Non-album singles
"MI LEGADO 70M x 58" (with Chael Produciendo)	2024	—	—	—	—	—		Non-album singles
"SOY UN BAD BOY" (with Luar La L and Jezzy)	2024	—	—	—	—	—		Non-album singles
"LA MANTECA DE CACAO" (with Yaisel LM and Shelow Shaq featuring Yomel El Meloso, El Sicokario and Young Gatillo)	2024	—	—	—	—	—		Non-album singles
"ESTE" (with Nfasis)	2024	—	—	—	—	—		Non-album singles
"NO NOS PARECEMOS"	2024	—	—	—	—	—		Non-album singles
"PARARA" (with Chimbala)	2024	—	—	—	—	—		Non-album singles
"GARGARA" (with Chael Produciendo)	2024	—	—	—	—	—		Non-album singles
"RIKITAN" (with Chael Produciendo)	2024	—	—	—	—	—		Non-album singles
"De Tiguere" (with Lomiiel and Braulio Fogon)	2024	—	—	—	—	—		Non-album singles
"Si, Es Así" (with Kim Loaiza)	2024	—	—	—	—	—		Non-album singles
"CUCULLO"	2024	—	—	—	—	—		Non-album singles
"Wow Que Sexy" (with Polo Joa)	2024	—	—	—	—	—		Non-album singles
"AHAH" (with Messiah and Dowba Montana)	2024	—	—	—	—	—		Non-album singles
"La Patrulla" (with Luis Brown, Lil Naay and Hades66)	2025	—	—	—	—	—		Non-album single
"Este Coco" (with Arlene MC)	2025	—	—	—	—	—		Non-album single
"Fulana" (with Pirlo and Chael Produciendo featuring Luis Brown)	2025	—	—	—	—	—		Non-album single
"Pa Japon"	2025	—	—	—	—	—		Non-album single
"WO" (with Braulio Fogon and Yaisel LM)	2025	—	—	—	—	—		Non-album single
"Que Te Cache" (with Angel Dior)	2025	—	—	—	—	—		Non-album single
"Mirala" (with Tivi Gunz, Montana 70 and La Melma Music)	2025	—	—	—	—	—		Non-album single
"3 Leches"	2025	—	—	—	—	—		Non-album single
"Lo Cuarto Del Kilo" (with La Manta and ZOJO RD)	2025	—	—	—	—	—		Non-album single
"Banda de Camion" (Remastered 2025) (with Chael Produciendo)	2025	—	—	—	—	—		Non-album single
"K PARA DE QUE" (with El Shick)	2025	—	—	—	—	—		Non-album single
"Subio La Libra" (with Anthony & Yeigo)	2025	—	—	—	—	—		Non-album single
"JamRock"	2025	—	—	—	—	—		Non-album single
"Se Riega" (with Myke Towers)	2025	—	—	—	—	—		Non-album single
"Persigue la 700" (with Chael Produciendo)	2025	—	—	—	—	—		Non-album single
"TA TO FRIO" (with Lapiz Conciente)	2025	—	—	—	—	—		Non-album single
"Quita y Pone" (with Fariana)	2025	—	—	—	—	—		Hasta Luego (Vol. 1)
"Bum Bum" (with Jon Z and Alofoke Music)	2025	—	—	—	—	—		Hasta Luego (Vol. 1)
"PA QUE TOSA" (with Bluemoney and Donaty featuring Etervidos, Bryant LR and Chael Produciendo)	2025	—	—	—	—	—		Hasta Luego (Vol. 1)
"SIN NOVIA" (Remix) (with Hades66, Chael Produciendo and Yaii King)	2025	—	—	—	—	—		Hasta Luego (Vol. 1)
"Rico En El Cementerio" (with Braulio Fogon)	2025	—	—	—	—	—		Hasta Luego (Vol. 1)
"SOBALA"	2025	—	—	—	—	—		Hasta Luego (Vol. 1)
"4 PA 4" (with El Bogueto and Bluemoney)	2025	—	—	—	—	—		Hasta Luego (Vol. 1)
"LICELOT" (with Brazil21 and Mr Manyao)	2025	—	—	—	—	—		Hasta Luego (Vol. 1)
"TU CABEZA EN LA SUBASTA" (with Ronny GTA and Chael Produciendo)	2026	—	—	—	—	—		Non-album single
"PANTI Y COLALE 2.0" (with De La Ghetto, Zion, DJ Chulo NYC, El Cherry Scom, La Greña, Ronny GTA and Ezzy R)	2026	—	—	—	—	—		Adios
"ABC" (with Ronny GTA)	2026	—	—	—	—	—		Adios
"POPPIN' BOTTLES (PAPENBAROS)"	2026	—	—	—	—	—		Adios
"MUEVEME ESAS NALGAS" (with DJ Human Star and Charly Gynn featuring Sarita)	2026	—	—	—	—	—		Non-album single
"ELLAS SABEN YA" (with Donaty and Orlando Moreno Feo)	2026	—	—	—	—	—		Non-album single
"Curazao (Chipeo En Vivo)"	2026	—	—	—	—	—		Non-album single
"REPARTOBOW (0 Mata 0)" (with Cosculluela, Ya Ice Dilan, Braulio Fogon and Yoan Retro)	2026	—	—	—	—	—		Non-album single
"—" denotes releases that did not chart.

==== As featured artist ====
List of singles with selected charts, certifications and album
Title	Year	Peak chart positions							Certifications	Album
Title	Year	ARG	NL	SPA	US Bub.	US Latin	US Dance	NZ	Certifications	Album
"Viajo Sin Ver" (Remix) (Jon Z featuring De La Ghetto, Almighty, Miky Woodz, El Alfa, Noriel, Ele A el Dominio, Lyan, Juanka El Problematik, Pusho and Jeycyn)	2018	—	—	—	—	—	—	—	RIAA: Gold (Latin)	Non-album single
"Que Calor" (Major Lazer featuring J Balvin and El Alfa)	2019	70	91	18	23	13	6	—	PROMUSICAE: Platinum; RIAA: Gold	Music Is the Weapon
"Mambo" (Steve Aoki and Willy William featuring Sean Paul, El Alfa, Sfera Ebbasta and Play-N-Skillz)	2021	—	—	—	—	—	41	—		Non-album singles
"Ten Cuidado" (Farruko, Pitbull and Iamchino featuring El Alfa and Omar Courtz)	2021	—	—	—	—	50	—	—	RIAA: Platinum (Latin)	Non-album singles
"Muñekita" (Kali Uchis featuring El Alfa and JT)	2023	—	—	—	—	31	—	— (Note: "Muñekita" did not enter the NZ Top 40 Singles Chart, but peaked at number 39 on the NZ Hot Singles Chart.)		Orquídeas
"La Botella" (Enrique Iglesias featuring El Alfa)	2024	—	—	—	—	—	—	—		Final (Vol. 2)
"La Botella" (Remix) (Enrique Iglesias and Descemer Bueno featuring El Alfa, L Kimii, Wow Popy, El Dray and Omi Hernandez)	2024	—	—	—	—	—	—	—		Non-album single
"ABAYARDE" (Huan62 featuring El Alfa and Hades66)	2025	—	—	—	—	—	—	—		Non-album singles
"BRUTA" (Óscar Maydon featuring El Alfa and Victor Mendivil)	2025	—	—	—	—	—	—	—		Non-album singles
"Jaque Mate" (Chris Lebrón featuring El Alfa)	2025	—	—	—	—	—	—	—		Non-album singles
"DOMI" (Alofoke Music featuring El Alfa, Braulio Fogon and others)	2025	—	—	—	—	—	—	—		Non-album singles
"Muévelo Muñeca" (Braulio Fogon featuring El Alfa, Donaty and Shadow Blow)	2025	—	—	—	—	—	—	—		Non-album singles
"MAS LINDA Y MAS BELLA" (Lomiiel featuring El Alfa)	2025	—	—	—	—	—	—	—		Non-album singles
"Voltio" (Yaisel LM featuring El Alfa)	2025	—	—	—	—	—	—	—		Non-album singles
"Me la Sube" (Chimbala featuring El Alfa)	2025	—	—	—	—	—	—	—		Non-album singles
"Kriminal" (Baby Gang featuring El Alfa, Omega and Roberto Ferrante)	2025	—	—	—	—	—	—	—		Non-album singles
"Pirata" (Danny Ocean featuring El Alfa)	2025	—	—	—	—	—	—	—		Non-album singles
"EL PEINE" (Noriel featuring El Alfa)	2025	—	—	—	—	—	—	—		Non-album singles
"Ropopocho" (Bebeshito featuring El Alfa, Roberto Ferrante and El Bandolero)	2025	—	—	—	—	—	—	—		Non-album singles
"Meneo" (Luis R. Conriquez and Joel De La P featuring El Alfa and Chimbala)	2025	—	—	—	—	—	—	—		Non-album singles
"MUNDO DE PIRAÑAS" (Jezzy featuring El Alfa)	2025	—	—	—	—	—	—	—		Non-album singles
"HACE CALOR" (María Becerra featuring El Alfa and XROSS)	2025	—	—	—	—	—	—	—		Non-album singles
"Barran" (Lil Pump featuring El Alfa)	2025	—	—	—	—	—	—	—		Non-album singles
"CINTURA (Republica Dominicana)" (Nfasis featuring El Alfa and DJ Human Star)	2026	—	—	—	—	—	—	—		Non-album single
"—" denotes releases that did not chart.

==== Other singles ====
- "Que Fue" featuring Tali Goya
- "Moviéndolo (Remix)" with Pitbull and Wisin & Yandel
- "La Mama De La Mama (Remix)" featuring Busta Rhymes, Anita, CJ, Wisin, El Cherry Scom, Chael Produciendo

=== Other charted and certified songs ===
List of songs with selected charts and album
Title	Year	Peak chart positions		Certifications	Album
Title	Year	SPA	US Latin	Certifications	Album
"Mi Mami" (featuring Cardi B)	2018	—	42		El Hombre
"Pa Jamaica"	2018	—	—	RIAA: Gold(Latin)	El Hombre
"La Romana" (Bad Bunny featuring El Alfa)	2018	80	12		X 100pre
"—" denotes releases that did not chart.
