= Rough and Ready =

Rough and Ready may refer to:

- "Old Rough and Ready", a nickname for U.S. President Zachary Taylor

== Geography ==
=== United States ===
- Rough and Ready, California, a census-designated place in Nevada County
- Rough and Ready, Georgia (present-day Mountain View, Georgia), an unincorporated community in Clayton County
- Rough and Ready, New York, a hamlet in the town of Greenwood
- Rough and Ready, Pennsylvania, an unincorporated town in Schuylkill County
- Ruff and Ready Island Naval Supply Depot Stockton, California
- Etna, California, originally named Rough and Ready

== Books, film and TV ==
- Rough and Ready, a 19th-century novel by Horatio Alger, Jr.
- Rough and Ready (1918 film), a silent film western
- Rough and Ready (1927 film), an American silent western film
- The Ruff and Reddy Show, an American animated television series

== Music ==
- Rough and Ready (album), an album by The Jeff Beck Group
- Rough & Ready Volume 1, an album by Shabba Ranks
  - Rough & Ready Volume 2
- Ruff and Ready: Live in Manchester, a DVD by Sonic Boom Six
- Rough 'n' Ready, triple-CD DVD Bernie Marsden

=== Songs ===
- "Old Rough and Ready Quickstep", an 1846 song by Charles Grobe
- "Rough & Ready", a 1973 country single by Peggy Sue (singer)
- "Rough & Ready", a 2004 song by Trace Adkins from Comin' On Strong
