= X-tra Naked =

Studio album by Shabba Ranks
- Released: October 1992
- Genres: Reggae fusion, dancehall, ragga
- Length: 48:45
- Label: Epic

Shabba Ranks chronology
Rough And Ready Volume 1 (1992)	X-tra Naked (1992)	Rough And Ready Volume 2 (1993)

Professional ratings
Review scores
Source	Rating
AllMusic	4.5/5 stars
Robert Christgau	C+
Los Angeles Times	3/4 stars
Music Week	2/5 stars
NME	5/10
Select	4/5 medals

X-tra Naked is a studio album released by Jamaican dancehall musician Shabba Ranks. It is possibly his most successful release. In 1993, the album won the Grammy Award for Best Reggae Album.

== Track listing ==
1. "Ting-A-Ling" - 3:52
2. "Slow and Sexy" (featuring Johnny Gill) - 5:18
3. "Will Power" - 3:35
4. "Muscle Grip" - 4:01
5. "Rude Boy" - 3:54
6. "Cocky Rim" - 3:37
7. "What'cha Gonna Do?" (featuring Queen Latifah) - 3:50
8. "Bedroom Bully" - 4:13
9. "Another One Program" - 3:39
10. "Ready-Ready, Goody-Goody" - 4:07
11. "Two Breddrens" (featuring Chubb Rock) - 4:25
12. "5-F Man" - 4:14
13. "Mr. Loverman" (with Chevelle Franklyn) - 5:58

== Charts ==
Chart (1992–1994)	Peak position
US Billboard 200	64
US Top R&B/Hip-Hop Albums (Billboard)	11
US Reggae Albums (Billboard)	14

== Certifications ==
Region	Certification	Certified units/sales
United States (RIAA)	Gold	500,000^{^}
^{^} Shipments figures based on certification alone.
