= Golden Touch =

Golden Touch may refer to:

- Midas touch, a Greek myth
- "Golden Touch" (song), a song by Razorlight
- Golden Touch (album), an album by Shabba Ranks
- The Golden Touch (film), a 1935 Walt Disney Silly Symphony cartoon
