= Dominican dembow =

Style of music from the Dominican Republic

- Native name: Dembow dominicano
- Stylistic origins: Reggaeton; merengue; Latin trap; house; dancehall
- Cultural origins: 1990s – 2000s, Dominican Republic

Dominican dembow (Spanish: dembow dominicano), also known as simply dembow, (Note: "Dembow" as the short name of the Dominican dembow subgenre should not be confused with the percussion rhythm of the same name.) is a style of music originating from the Dominican Republic which has been mostly described as a subgenre or derivative form of reggaeton which evolved from dancehall. Dominican dembow is characterized by its use of a sped-up dembow rhythm as its core percussion element (while standard reggaeton employs the same rhythm at a slower tempo). The name dembow is credited to the Shabba Ranks song "Dem Bow" which was reworked by Wisin & Yandel and many others; the dembow beat became a staple in the reggaeton community.

The subgenre diverged from reggaeton during the 2000s. During this time, Puerto Rican reggaeton was evolving to become more melodic, polished, and lyrically romantic, and would eventually become the basis for most reggaeton music today. However, the "softening process" marginalized the scene in the Dominican Republic, which retained a rawer, unembellished, and more aggressive sound. A simultaneous shift towards faster tempos may have also been influenced by the country's "historical preference" for the fast-paced merengue genre.

Dominican dembow ultimately spread its influence beyond the Dominican Republic to countries like Spain, the United States, Chile, and Italy. It came to be known globally as a result of the general growing popularity of Spanish-language music in the 2010s. During this same decade, trap music began to influence the production style of Dominican dembow.

Dominican dembow artists are known as dembowseros. Notable dembowseros include Tokischa, Chimbala, El Alfa, Jey One, and Rochy RD. Non-Dominican artists have also occasionally produced songs in this style, such as Bad Bunny with his hit songs "Tití Me Preguntó" and "NUEVAYoL".

== See also ==
- Music of the Dominican Republic
