= List of Billboard number-one R&B albums of 1991 =

These are the Billboard magazine R&B albums that reached number one in 1991.

== Chart history ==
Issue date	Album	Artist
January 5	I'm Your Baby Tonight	Whitney Houston
January 12	I'm Your Baby Tonight	Whitney Houston
January 19	I'm Your Baby Tonight	Whitney Houston
January 26	I'm Your Baby Tonight	Whitney Houston
February 2	The Future	Guy
February 9	The Future	Guy
February 16	The Future	Guy
February 23	Do Me Again	Freddie Jackson
March 2	Do Me Again	Freddie Jackson
March 9	I'm Your Baby Tonight	Whitney Houston
March 16	I'm Your Baby Tonight	Whitney Houston
March 23	Business as Usual	EPMD
March 30	Business as Usual	EPMD
April 6	Ralph Tresvant	Ralph Tresvant
April 13	Ralph Tresvant	Ralph Tresvant
April 20	Hi-Five	Hi-Five
April 27	New Jack City	Soundtrack / Various artists
May 4	New Jack City	Soundtrack / Various artists
May 11	New Jack City	Soundtrack / Various artists
May 18	New Jack City	Soundtrack / Various artists
May 25	New Jack City	Soundtrack / Various artists
June 1	New Jack City	Soundtrack / Various artists
June 8	New Jack City	Soundtrack / Various artists
June 15	New Jack City	Soundtrack / Various artists
June 22	Power of Love	Luther Vandross
June 29	Power of Love	Luther Vandross
July 6	Make Time for Love	Keith Washington
July 13	Make Time for Love	Keith Washington
July 20	Power of Love	Luther Vandross
July 27	Power of Love	Luther Vandross
August 3	Jungle Fever	Soundtrack / Stevie Wonder
August 10	Jungle Fever	Soundtrack / Stevie Wonder
August 17	Power of Love	Luther Vandross
August 24	Cooleyhighharmony	Boyz II Men
August 31	Cooleyhighharmony	Boyz II Men
September 7	Boyz n the Hood	Soundtrack / Various artists
September 14	Boyz n the Hood	Soundtrack / Various artists
September 21	Boyz n the Hood	Soundtrack / Various artists
September 28	Boyz n the Hood	Soundtrack / Various artists
October 5	Can You Stop the Rain	Peabo Bryson
October 12	Can You Stop the Rain	Peabo Bryson
October 19	Good Woman	Gladys Knight
October 26	Different Lifestyles	BeBe & CeCe Winans
November 2	Different Lifestyles	BeBe & CeCe Winans
November 9	As Raw As Ever	Shabba Ranks
November 16	Forever My Lady	Jodeci
November 23	Apocalypse 91... The Enemy Strikes Black	Public Enemy
November 30	Forever My Lady	Jodeci
December 7	Diamonds and Pearls	Prince and The New Power Generation
December 14	Death Certificate	Ice Cube
December 21	Death Certificate	Ice Cube
December 28	Death Certificate	Ice Cube

== See also ==
- 1991 in music
- R&B number-one hits of 1991 (USA)
