= La Leyenda del Dembow World Tour =

2021–22 concert tour by El Alfa

- Tour by El Alfa
- Associated album: El Androide; Sabiduria
- Start date: October 15, 2021
- End date: November 27, 2022
- Legs: 3
- No. of shows: 32

El Alfa concert chronology
- El Animal Tour (2019); La Leyenda del Dembow Tour (2021–22); La Leyenda Del Dembow USA Tour (2023)

The La Leyenda del Dembow Tour was the first world tour by Dominican dembow superstar El Alfa in support of his studio albums El Androide (2020) and Sabiduria (2022). The tour consisted on three legs. The first leg, was his the first arena tour on the United States, the second on a series of music festivals on Europe and concluded in Santo Domingo, Dominican Republic. The tour included a sellout concert in New York, Madison Square Garden which receive positive reviews by critics becoming the first Dominican urban act to do so. On July 16, El Alfa performed at Estadio Olimpico in Santo Domingo, in front of 50,000 fans, becoming just the seventh Dominican act to sold out the venue and the first urban act to do so.

On June 5, 2023, It was announced that the tour was renamed La Leyenda del Dembow USA Tour with 10 new shows in the United States in fall of that year to promote his album Sagitario. Once again, The tour was renamed La Leyenda del Dembow Europe Tour 2024 with 15 shows across the continent during summer 2024.

== Tour dates ==
Date	City	Country	Venue
Leg 1 – North America
October 15, 2021	Sugar Land	United States	Smart Financial Centre
October 22, 2021	New York City	United States	Madison Square Garden
October 24, 2021	Boston	United States	Agganis Arena
October 28, 2021	Miami	United States	FTX Arena
November 5, 2021	Oakland	United States	Oakland Arena
November 6, 2021	Inglewood	United States	YouTube Theater
November 18, 2021	Rosemont	United States	Rosemont Theatre
November 20, 2021 (Note: The concert of November 20, 2021, was part of Ambiente Music Festival 2021)	Willemstad	Curaçao	Curaçao Festival Center
November 27, 2021 (Note: The November 27, 2021, concert was part of Coca Cola Flow Fest 2021)	Mexico City	Mexico	Autódromo Hermanos Rodríguez
December 18, 2021	San Juan	Puerto Rico	Coliseo de Puerto Rico
January 29, 2022 (Note: The concert of January 29, 2022, was part of Calibash 2022)	Las Vegas	United States	T-Mobile Arena
February 5, 2022	Mashantucket	United States	Premier Theater
May 21, 2022 (Note: The concert of May 21, 2022, was Power Fest 2022)	Monterrey	Mexico	Parque Fundadora
May 28, 2022 (Note: The May 28, 2022, concert was part of Sueños Festival 2022)	Chicago	United States	Grant Park
Leg 2 – Europe
June 25, 2022 (Note: The concert of June 25, 2022, is part of El Granada Music Festival 2022)	Granada	Spain	Cortijo del Conde
June 26, 2022 (Note: The concert of June 26, 2022, is part of Reggaeton Beach Festival)	Aviles	Spain	Centro Cultural Internacional Oscar Niemeyer
June 30, 2022	Rome	Italy	Fiesta
July 2, 2022 (Note: The concert of July 2, 2022, is part of Puro Latino Music Festival)	Sevilla	Spain	Estadio de la Cartuja
July 4, 2022 (Note: The concert of July 4, 2022, is part of Milano Latin Festival 2022)	Milan	Italy	Ticketmaster Arena
July 7, 2022 (Note: The concert of July 7, 2022, was part of the 7th Brutal)	Ibiza	Italy	Amnesia
July 8, 2022 (Note: The concert of July 8, 2022, is part of Latino Gang Fest 2022)	Breda	Netherlands	Breepark
July 10, 2022 (Note: The concert of July 10, 2022, was part of Reggaeton Beach Festival 2022)	Benidorm	Spain	Estadio Municipal Guillermo Amor
Leg 3 – Latin America
July 16, 2022	Santo Domingo	Dominican Republic	Estadio Olimipico Felix Sanchez
July 23, 2022	Fairfax	United States	Eagle Bank Arena
August 14, 2022 (Note: The concert of August 14, 2022, was part of Baja Beach Festival 2022)	Rosario	Mexico	Rosario beach
August 21, 2022 (Note: The concert of August 21, 2022, was part of Baja Beach Festival 2022)	Rosario	Mexico	Rosario beach
August 27, 2022 (Note: The concert of August 27, 2022, was part of Festiva Fuego Fuego 2022)	Montreal	Canada	Esplanade Financière Sun Life Du Parc Olympique
September 17, 2022 (Note: The concert of September 17, 2022, was part of Soulfrito Music Festival)	Brooklyn	United States	Barclay Center
September 30, 2022	Caracas	Venezuela	Estacionamiento del Poliedro de Caracas
October 1, 2022	Puerto de la Cruz	Venezuela	Estadio Chico Carrasquel de Puerto La Cruz
November 27, 2022 (Note: The concert of November 27, 2022, was part of Coca Cola Flow Fest 2022)	Mexico City	Mexico	Autódromo Hermanos Rodríguez
Leg 4 - United States
October 12, 2023	Houston	United States	Smart Financial Centre
October 15, 2023	Los Angeles	United States	Microsoft Theater
October 28, 2023	Boston	United States	Agganis Arena
October 29, 2023	Washington	United States	Eaglebank Arena
November 25, 2023	Miami	United States	Kaseya Center
November 30, 2023	Ft. Myers	United States	Hertz Arena
December 3, 2023	Reading	United States	Santander Arena
December 10, 2023	Orlando	United States	Amway Center
December 15, 2023	Chicago	United States	Rosemont Theater
Leg 5 - Europe
June 29, 2024 (Note: The concert of June 29, 2024 was part of Reggaeton Beach Festival)	Oropesa	Spain	Recinto de Conciertos Municipal
June 30, 2024 (Note: The concert of June 30, 2024 in Tenerife was part of Reggaeton Beach Festival 2024)	Tenerife	Spain	Puerto de la Cruz.
July 4, 2024	Paris	France	Le Zenith
July 6, 2024 (Note: The concert of July 6, 2024 at Benidorm was part of Reggaeton Beach Festival 2024)	Benidorm	Spain	Estadio Municipal Guillermo Amor
July 7, 2024 (Note: The concert of July 7, 2024 was part of Reggaeton Beach Festival 2024)	Malaga	Spain	
July 12, 2024 (Note: The concert of July 12, 2024 in Almeria was part of Puro Latino Fest 2024)	Almeria	Spain	Recinto de Conciertos del Ferial de Almería
July 13, 2024 (Note: The Concert ofnJuly 13, 2024 in Santeder was part of Reggaeton Beach Festival 2024)	Santander	Spain	Virgen del Mar
July 14, 2024 (Note: The concert of July 14, 2024 in Mallorca was part of Reggaeton Beach Festival 2024)	Mallorca	Spain	Can Picafort
July 20, 2024 (Note: The concert of July 20, 2024 was part of Reggaeton Beach Festival 2024)	Barcelona	Spain	Circuit de Barcelona
July 21, 2024 (Note: The concert of July 21, 2024 in Madrid was part of Reggaeton Beach Festival 2024)	Madrid	Spain	La Caja Magica
July 26, 2024 (Note: The concert of July 26, 2024 was part of Puro Latino Fest 2024)	Cadiz	Spain	Recinto Ferial Las Banderas
July 28, 2024 (Note: The concert of July 28, 2024 was part of Reggaeton Beach Festival 2024)	Gran Canaria	Spain	Mercadillo Recinto Ferial San Rafael
August 2, 2024	London	United Kingdom	Indigo at The O2
August 3, 2024 (Note: The concert of August 3, 2024 was part of Reggaeton Beach Festival 2024)	Galacia	Spain	Polígono Industrial de Porto do Molle
August 4, 2024 (Note: The concert of August 4, 2024 was part of Reggaeton Beach Festival 2024)	Torrevieja	Spain	Parque Antonio Soria

=== Cancelled dates ===
List of cancelled concerts, showing date, city, country, venue, and reason for cancellation
Date	City	Country	Venue	Reason
October 14, 2021	Irving	United States	Pavilion at Toyota Music Factory	Unknown
October 17, 2021	San Antonio	United States	Freeman Coliseum	Unknown
October 30, 2021	Duluth	United States	Gas South Arena	Unknown
November 7, 2021	San Diego	United States	Viejas Arena	Unknown
November 11, 2021	Denver	United States	Fillmore Auditorium Denver	Unknown
November 13, 2021	Phoenix	United States	The Van Buren	Unknown
November 21, 2021	Las Vegas	United States	Cosmopolitan of Las Vegas	Unknown
