= El Hombre (El Alfa album) =

Studio album by El Alfa
- Released: November 2, 2018
- Recorded: 2018
- Genre: Dembow
- Length: 53:11
- Label: El Jefe Records

El Alfa chronology
Disciplina (Puerto Rico Edition) (2018)	El Hombre (2018)	El Androide (2020)

El Hombre is the second studio album by dominican dembow artist El Alfa, released on November 2, 2018 by the independent label El Jefe Records. It contains 14 tracks of Dembow and Latin Trap and incorporates elements of dancehall, reggae, and hip-hop. It also includes remixes of the hits "Suave" and "Lo que yo diga". It features guest appearances from Cardi B, Anuel AA, Bryant Myers, Jon Z, Miky Woodz, Noriel, Plan B, Miky Woodz, Farruko, La Kikada, Mozart La Para & El Shick. The album was supported by the release of nine singles: "Mi Mami", "Pa Jamaica", "Con Silenciador", "Suave" (remix), "Sientate en ese deo", "Lo que yo diga" (remix), "Puñala de Carne" and "Uzi".

The lead single "Mi mami" featuring Cardi B, produced by Chael, became his first song to debut inside the US Hot Latin Songs at number 42. However, it received backlash by critics and fans alike due to the musical structure. Many observed that the track should have been Dembow instead of dancehall.

El Hombre became his first album to debut inside the Top 10 of the US Billboard Top Latin Albums chart at number 7, and peaked at number 6 at the US Latin Rhythm Albums, selling over 2,000 in the first week. Following the success of the album, El Alfa won Best Urban Artist at the 35th annual Soberano Awards. To promote the album, El Alfa embarked on a US Tour titled El Animal Tour.

== Track listing ==
No.	Title	Length
1.	"Mi Mami" (featuring Cardi B)	3:05
2.	"Mas flow que tu"	2:55
3.	"Teniendo Sex"	3:05
4.	"Pa` Jamaica"	3:19
5.	"El Hombre"	2:58
6.	"Quitenselo"	3:24
7.	"Con Silenciador" (featuring Anuel AA)	2:54
8.	"Suave" (remix) (featuring Chencho "Plan B", Bryant Myers, Noriel, Jon Z, Miky Woodz)	5:05
9.	"Sientate en ese deo"	3:41
10.	"Yo no cojo fiao" (with Jon Z)	3:36
11.	"Lo que yo diga" (remix) (with Farruko, Jon Z, Miky Woodz)	6:29
12.	"Puñala de carne" (featuring El Shick)	2:45
13.	"Los Patrones" (featuring Mozart La Para & La Kikada)	4:49
14.	"Uzi"	5:08
Total length:		53:13
