= Deborahe Glasgow =

- Also known as: Debbie G
- Born: 19 January 1966
- Origin: London, England
- Died: 25 January 1994 (aged 28)
- Genres: Reggae, lovers rock
- Occupation: Singer
- Years active: 1977–1994
- Label: Greensleeves Records

Deborahe Elizabeth Glasgow (19 January 1966 – 25 January 1994) was an English lovers rock singer of Guyanese parentage, who was active from the late 1970s to the beginning of the 1990s. Though Glasgow released only one album in her lifetime, 1989's Deborahe Glasgow, she began releasing singles in her adolescence. She is perhaps best known for her duet with Shabba Ranks on a song initially released as "Champion Lover" on her eponymous album, but recut by Ranks as "Mr. Loverman" in 1990.

== Life and career ==
Glasgow was born in London in 1966, recording her first single "Fallin' in Love" (as Debbie G) in her mid teens for producer Mad Professor's Ariwa label. She steadily built up a following amongst black Londoners by working the local sound system circuit. This led to a record contract with Greensleeves Records' Bubblers subsidiary, and a series of popular singles, including "Knight in Shining Armour", "When Somebody Loves You Back" and "Don't Stay Away".

An album collaboration in Jamaica in 1989 with dancehall producer Augustus "Gussie" Clarke, backed on many tracks by Steely & Cleevie proved the highlight of Glasgow's short career and "made her name a legend." The resultant collection of songs is representative of the Lovers rock genre and described by some critics as "the best lovers rock album ever recorded". "Champion Lover" revealed an uncharacteristically hard-edged sound, with the 12" "Sex" mix of the track representing a move towards dancehall, and sentiments that were less innocent in content than other Glasgow recordings. In 1990, Shabba Ranks versioned "Champion Lover" under the new title "Mr. Loverman" on his album Rappin' with the Ladies. He later re-recorded the tune, this time with Chevelle Franklin as the featured singer, and this version became a worldwide hit.

At the start of the 1990s, Glasgow collaborated briefly with General Lee, resulting in the tracks "Weak" and "Knocking the Boots". However, aside from some lucrative work on advertisement jingles, her recording career was largely dormant. Instead she opted to devote more time to the needs of her young family. She was diagnosed with lymphatic cancer, the complications from which ultimately claimed her life. She died in Wandsworth, South London on 25 January 1994 of a cerebral hemorrhage at the age of twenty eight. A remembrance tour that played London, Birmingham and Manchester took place to help raise funds for her four surviving children.

== Album discography ==
- Deborahe Glasgow (1989), Greensleeves
- Gimme Your Love (1994), World
- The Legend (1999), World
