= Disciplina (album) =

Studio album by El Alfa
- Released: August 11, 2017
- Recorded: 2017
- Genre: Dembow
- Length: 24:16
- Label: El Jefe Records

El Alfa chronology
Exitos Vol. 1 (2017)	Disciplina (2017)	Disciplina (Puerto Rico Edition) (2018)

Disciplina (English: Discipline) is the debut studio album by Dominican urban artist El Alfa, released on August 11, 2017, by El Jefe Records. It contains 8 tracks of dembow and Latin Trap. It features guest verses from La Manta, Amenazzy, Bryant Mayers and La Manta. According to the artist, the title was chosen because perseverance is an essential part of success. It is his first studio album after a ten-year musical career.

Lyrical themes include sex, partying, and self-reflection. The intro track, "Un Consejo Para Mi Hijo", is dedicated to Alfa's son and expresses his wishes to have a bright future. La Manta, the first artist to be signed to Alfa's own label, appeared on two tracks on the album. The album debuted at number 45 on US Billboard Top Latin Albums. It was his first album to debut on the chart. On February 9, 2018, El Alfa released a follow-up titled Disciplina (Puerto Rico Edition).

== Track listing ==
Disciplina track listing
No.	Title	Length
1.	"Intro"	4:00
2.	"El Tiempo Paso"	2:37
3.	"Millionario al Tiro" (featuring La Manta)	4:14
4.	"En una Caja de Muerto" (featuring Amenazzy)	2:48
5.	"Le Queda Bailando"	2:38
6.	"La Pegajosa" (featuring Bryant Myers)	2:37
7.	"Facetime"	2:45
8.	"Abofetiao" (featuring La Manta)	2:34
Total length:		24:16

== Charts ==
Chart performance for Disciplina
Chart (2017)	Peak position
US Top Latin Albums (Billboard)	45
US Latin Rhythm Albums (Billboard)	11
