= Coronao Now =

Single by El Alfa with Lil Pump

from the album El Androide
- Released: November 7, 2019
- Length: 3:37
- Label: El Jefe Record Music
- Songwriter: Enmanuel Herrera Batista

El Alfa singles chronology
"Mueve la Cadera" (2019)	"Coronao Now" (2019)	"Pam" (2020)

Lil Pump singles chronology
"Pose to Do" (2019)	"Coronao Now" (2019)	"Poppin" (2020)

"Coronao Now" is a song by Dominican urban artist El Alfa with American rapper Lil Pump. It was released on November 7, 2019. The single reached a peak position of 31 on the Billboard Hot Latin Songs chart.

A remix version was released with Vin Diesel, Sech and Myke Towers.

== Music video ==
The music video was recorded in Santo Domingo, Dominican Republic, and has surpassed 100 million views.

== Charts ==
Chart (2019–2020)	Peak position
Dominican Republic (SODINPRO)	13
Dominican Republic (SODINPRO) Remix Version	17
Honduras Urban Airplay (Monitor Latino)	14
Nicaragua (Monitor Latino)	1
Panama (Monitor Latino)	14
Spain (PROMUSICAE) Remix Version	61
US Hot Latin Songs (Billboard)	30
