= Rappin' with the Ladies =

Studio album by Shabba Ranks
- Released: LP:1988, CD:1990
- Genre: Ragga, dancehall, reggae fusion
- Length: 65:44
- Label: VP

Shabba Ranks chronology
Rappin' with the Ladies (1988)	Just Reality (1991)

Professional ratings
Review scores
Source	Rating
AllMusic	4/5 stars

Rappin' with the Ladies is the second album by dancehall artist and deejay Shabba Ranks, released in 1988. The album contains collaborations with J.C. Lodge and Deborahe Glasgow.

== Track listing ==
1. "Telephone Love Deh Pon Mi Mind" – 6:14
2. "Just Be Good to Me" – 6:26
3. "Steady Man" – 5:36
4. "Mr. Loverman" – 5:39
5. "Hardcore Loving" – 6:03
6. "Action Packed" – 6:40
7. "Twice My Age" – 6:33
8. "Don't Test Me" – 5:26
9. "Just Be Good to Me" – 5:40 (CD only)
10. "Looking for Action" – 5:49 (CD only)
11. "Hardcore Loving" – 5:47 (CD only)
