= A Mi Shabba =

Studio album by Shabba Ranks
- Released: June 13, 1995
- Genre: Ragga, dancehall, reggae fusion
- Label: Epic

Shabba Ranks chronology
Rough And Ready Volume 2 (1993)	A Mi Shabba (1995)	Get Up Stand Up (1998)

Professional ratings
Review scores
Source	Rating
AllMusic	3/5 stars

A Mi Shabba is an album by Shabba Ranks. It was released after a two-year gap in album releases and received fairly average reviews.

== Track listing ==
No.	Title	Writer(s)	Length
1.	"Ram Dance Hall"	Dillon, Dunbar, Gordon, Hartley, Shakespeare, Staff, Willis	4:10
2.	"Shine Eye Gal"	Gordon, Rose, Simpson	4:25
3.	"Spoil Mi Appetite"	Gordon, Hartley	3:41
4.	"Well Done"	Dixon, Gordon, Hartley, Heywood, Heywood	3:43
5.	"Fattie Fattie"	Gordon, Sibbles	4:05
6.	"Rough Life"	Combs, Gordon, Stone	4:00
7.	"Let's Get It On"	Gordon, Morales, Reid	5:18
8.	"Ice Cream Love"	Gordon, Osbourne, Smith	4:25
9.	"High Seat"	Browne, Dillon, Gordon, Hartley, Johnson	4:18
10.	"Gal Nuh Ready"	Dunbar, Gordon, Hartley, Shakespeare, Willis	3:52
11.	"Medal and Certificate"	Browne, Gordon, Johnson	4:12
12.	"Original Woman"	Gordon, Manne, Remi	3:58
