= Get Up Stand Up (album) =

Studio album by Shabba Ranks
- Released: November 1998
- Genre: Reggae, dancehall
- Label: Artists Only
- Producer: King Jammy

Shabba Ranks chronology
A Mi Shabba (1995)	Get Up Stand Up (1998)	Shabba Ranks And Friends (1999)

Professional ratings
Review scores
Source	Rating
AllMusic	3/5 stars
The Encyclopedia of Popular Music	3/5 stars

Get Up Stand Up is a studio album by Shabba Ranks, released in 1998. It was Ranks's final studio album, and contains many remixes of songs previously recorded by him.

== Critical reception ==
AllMusic called Get Up Stand Up "a strange but highly effective Frankenstein's monster of an album," writing that "the combination of Shabba Ranks and King Jammy is simply a can't-miss proposition."

== Track listing ==
1. Get Up Stand Up (remix)
2. Mus Haffi Learn
3. Mus Love Reggae
4. Can't Keep Me Down (remix)
5. Halla Fi Buddy (remix)
6. Mus Get A Man
7. Live Blanket (remix)
8. Wine Mi Tonight
9. Best Grandfather
10. Be Careful
11. Love Punanny Bad
12. Who She Love
13. Original Fresh
14. Rule Mi Route
