= Blakkman =

Jamaican singer-songwriter and DJ

Oral White (born March 7, 1982, in Grantham, Clarendon, Jamaica W.I.), better known by his performing name Blakkman, is a Jamaican singer-songwriter and DJ. He is best known for his hit singles "Nine Night" and "Hurt Dem"; and his two collaborations with Dexta Daps, "I Miss You So Much" and "Superhero".

== Music career ==
In 2010 Blakkman joined Bounty Killer's music empire The Alliance as a songwriter. Blakkman wrote several songs for Bounty Killer, including "Rock and Roll" on the Aftershock Riddim, which was used to battle Mavado at Sting. In November 2014 Blakkman recorded his first hit single, "Nine Night", on the Wasp Nest Riddim. In 2015 "Nine Night" became the most requested dubplate in Jamaica and won two major sound Clashes, the Boom Alstar Clash with Fire Links Sound and The Guinness sounds of Greatness with No Limit Sound.

In March 2015 Blakkman signed a recording contract with Island Jams Records. He recorded "Healing", a song produced by Island Jams.

Blakkman has collaborated with notable artists including Beenie Man, Voicemail, Aidonia, and Dexta Daps.

== Discography ==
Year	Song title	Featured artist	Producer	Riddim
2014	"Nine Night"	N/A	Cash Flow Records	Wasp Nest Riddim
2014	"Step Pan Di Gas"	N/A	Cash Flow Records	
2015	"So Mi Get Dem"	N/A	Mr G Music	
2015	"I Miss You So Much"	Dexta Daps	Frenz For Real	
2015	"God Over Man"	N/A	135 Records	
2015	"Jah Ova Bad"	N/A	VA Records	
2014	"Dem Heart Nuh Clean"	Mr G	Troyton Music	
2015	"Yuh Waistline Outa Control"	Aidonia		
2015	"Healing"	N/A	Island Jams	FaceTime Riddim
2015	"More Gyal"	N/A	Island Jams	Bruk It Off Riddim
2015	"Ghetto Paradise"	Raine Seville	Island Jams	
2016	"Real Detonator"	N/A	Island Jams	
2016	"Real Bad Man"	Beenie Mann		
2016	"Dem Dead"			
2016	"Ready Fi Kill"			
2016	"Press Mi Press"	Miscik Music	Miscik Music	Muddy Riddim
2016	"Full Dem Up"			Rice & Peas Riddim
2016	"Every Gyal"	N/A	Truck Back Records	
2016	"Bay Gyal"			
2017	"Si Fi"	N/A	Airstrike Riddim	Jet Set Records
2017	"Sink It"	Shauna Chyn		
2017	"Beautiful Girls"	N/A		
2016	"Temperature"	N/A	Snook Eye Music	
2016	"Example"			
2017	"Dem Nuh Bad"	PayDay Music Group	Benelli Riddim	
2016	"Head Sick"	N/A	One Army Entertainment	
2016	"Hamma Fly Back"	N/A	One Army Entertainment	
2017	"No Woman Nuh Cry"	Beenie Man	Ireland Records	
2017	"Hurt Dem"	N/A	Ireland Records	Riddim 21
2017	"Superhero"	Dexta Daps	Daseca	
