= Contra el Tiempo =

Studio album by Don Miguelo
- Released: June 13, 2006
- Recorded: 2005
- Genre: Reggaeton
- Length: 47:51
- Label: JVN Music, Inc.

Don Miguelo chronology
Contra el Tiempo (2006)	Exitos (2017)

Singles from Contra el Tiempo
- 1. "Que Tu Quieres" Released: February 2005; 2. "Acelerao y Pico" Released: 2005; 3. "Ma'Taide" Released: 2006

Contra el Tiempo is the debut album by the Dominican urban artist Don Miguelo, released on June 13, 2006, by JVN Music ( All songs written or co-written by Don Miguelo). It contains 14 tracks of reggaeton and Latin urban with feature guest appearances Domenic M, Monchy & Alexandra, Mary O'Nellon and Frank Reyes. The album was supported by the release of three official singles; Ma'taide, Acelearo & Pico and the lead singles Que Tu Quieres (Cola de Motora) which was released in February 2005, which was a national success inside the Dominican Republic, receiving exposure and attention by the local media.

Following the success of the singles released, Don Miguelo won Best New Artist, at the 2006's Soberano Awards, previously known as, Casandra Awards, becoming the first Dominican urban act to ever win such an award. Also, it was the first one to gain international exposure when the track "Ma`Taide" reached number 15 at US Tropical Airplay. After releasing the album, Don Miguelo embarked on a promotional tour and public appearances in the United States and Spain. To promote the album, Miguelo embarked on small venue concert tour during 2006 visiting territories such as Saint Marti, Germany, France, Italy, Austria, Spain, United States and the Dominican Republic.

== Background ==
Don Miguelo, born in 1981, started his musical career as a Hip Hop act in 1996. According to himself, he grown up surround music and that inspired him to start to record and write his own tracks. In 1998, he released his first song "Sirena" but it didn't receive attention by local media and radio. In February 2005, Miguelo released the song "Que Tu Quieres", better known as "Cola de Motora". At the beginning, he promote the track himself giving free copies to truck and bus drivers. However, he decided to send the track to Ronald Grullon, that introduced the track to the radio and quickly in gain attention by listeners and become and national hit. Following that, he started to perform at small night clubs around the country.

By September 2005, he signed with J&N Records to record and album and promote his career internationally. On an interview in March 2006, announced that his album titled "Ma`Taide" was finished and 13 tracks of 14 were written by him. On the same interview explains that he had a track with Residente Calle 13. However, the song was never released or appeared on the tracklist and the title of the album was changed to "Contra El Tiempo".

== Tracklist ==
No.	Title	Length
1.	"Intro"	0:57
2.	"Que Tu Quieres" (featuring Domenic M)	3:37
3.	"Vamo' a Mojarte"	3:45
4.	"El Ponchao'"	3:57
5.	"Dame una Noche" (featuring Monchy & Alexandra)	3:37
6.	"Acelerao' y Pico"	3:37
7.	"Vente Conmigo"	3:43
8.	"Primer Round"	3:17
9.	"Sirena" (featuring Messias)	3:31
10.	"Ma' Taide"	3:38
11.	"Déjame Tocarte" (featuring Mary O'Nellon)	3:39
12.	"Llévate la Cama pa' la Calle" (featuring Frank Reyes)	3:33
13.	"Dame un Chin"	3:23
14.	"Que Tu Quieres"	3:37
Total length:		47:51

== Credits and personnel ==
- Executive Producer: Nelson Estevez
- Additional Personnel: Indhira
- Executive Producer: Victor Reyes
- Graphic Design: Ivan Valera
