= Mr. Loverman =

1991 single by Shabba Ranks

Single by Shabba Ranks

from the album Rough & Ready Vol. 1 and Deep Cover (soundtrack)
- Released: 1991
- Genre: R&B; reggae fusion; dancehall
- Length: 3:36
- Label: Epic
- Songwriters: Shabba Ranks; Mikey Bennett; Hopeton Lindo
- Producers: Clifton Dillon; Mikey Bennett

Shabba Ranks singles chronology
"Love Punaany Bad" (1991)	"Mr. Loverman" (1991)	"Slow and Sexy" (1991)

Music video
- "Mr. Loverman" on YouTube

Shabba Ranks singles chronology
"I Was a King" (1991)	"Mr. Loverman" (1991)	"Housecall" (1991)

"Mr. Loverman" is a song by Jamaican dancehall artist Shabba Ranks, released in 1991 as a single by Epic Records. It reached number 40 on the US Billboard Hot 100 and number three on the UK Singles Chart, as well as becoming a top-20 hit in France, Germany and Ireland. The song was written by Ranks, Mikey Bennett and Hopeton Lindon. The accompanying music video was directed by Fab 5 Freddy. German Spex included "Mr. Loverman" in their "The Best Singles of the Century" list in 1999, and Q Magazine featured it in their list of the "1001 Best Songs Ever" in 2003.

== Origin of song ==
The song first appeared as "Champion Lover" by Deborahe Glasgow. Ranks then versioned "Champion Lover" under the new title "Mr. Lover Man", with Deborahe Glasgow the featured female lead. This version appeared on his Rappin' with the Ladies album in 1988. Glasgow's illness and subsequent early death led to the song being re-recorded for release as a single, this time with Chevelle Franklyn as the featured singer.

The version featuring Chevelle Franklyn was originally released in 1992 with the David Morales remix promoted as the main version, when it charted in a modest position on the UK Singles Chart, but after being re-released in 1993, when dancehall music was starting to enjoy mainstream popularity, the track rose to number three on the UK Singles Chart and remains his biggest hit single to date.

This track also features the first time he used his trademark cry "Shabba!", using the sampled vocals of Maxi Priest from the track "Housecall" on Ranks' 1991 album As Raw As Ever. The song also contains a sample of the 1973 single “Impeach the President” by The Honeydrippers.

== Critical reception ==
AllMusic editor Ron Wynn stated that the artist "kept the slack dancehall", noting his "thick, patois-laced delivery" on the song, that "basically defined" the album. J.D. Considine from The Baltimore Sun commented, "Although 'Mr. Loverman' starts off with a drumbeat and backing vocals that would seem at home on any rap album, Shabba's thick accent and sing-song delivery couldn't have come from anywhere but the dancehall scene. It isn't just the way his deep, rough-edged voice booms in hypnotic repetition, either. Most of Shabba's effectiveness stems from his ability to fuse each rhyme into a near-perfect blend of sound and rhythm; drop the rhythm track, and his performances would still be as danceable and addictive."

Larry Flick from Billboard magazine wrote that "the Shabba Ranks success story will have yet another glowing chapter added once radio programmers get their hands on this deliciously sexy R&B/dancehall gem. A languid, shuffling groove is enhanced by easygoing toasting and sultry femme backing vocals. Yummmm." John Martinucci from the Gavin Report felt the song "has hit written all over it". In his UK chart commentary, James Masterton declared it "a strong contender for No. 1", and "a far cry from the days when he was merely the added novelty on Scritti Politti's version of the Beatles' 'She's a Woman' which represented his first ever chart appearance in this country." A reviewer from Music & Media said that the "top man in the ranks of raggamuffin artists knows the tricks to break a relatively unknown musical genre. He keeps it simple and accessible with a very high sing-along factor." James Hamilton from Music Week's RM Dance Update described the song as a "huskily ragga rapped swayer."

== Music video ==
A music video was produced to promote the single, directed by American visual artist, filmmaker, and hip hop pioneer Fab 5 Freddy.

== Track listings ==
- 7-inch single
1. "Mr. Loverman" (radio mix) – 3:36
2. "Mr. Loverman" (twin city crew mix) – 4:05
- 12-inch maxi
1. "Mr. Loverman" (D.M. ragga hop mix) – 6:05
2. "Mr. Loverman" (twin city crew mix) – 4:05
3. "Mr. Loverman" (new world mix) – 4:22
4. "Mr. Loverman" (raggamental mix) – 4:24
- CD maxi
1. "Mr. Loverman" (radio mix) – 3:36
2. "Mr. Loverman" (D.M. ragga hop mix) – 6:05
3. "Mr. Loverman" (twin city crew mix) – 4:05
4. "Mr. Loverman" (raggamental mix) – 4:24
5. "Ca'an Dunn" – 5:23
6. "The Jam" (back to the bridge) – 4:30
- CD maxi – Remixes
1. "Mr Loverman" (D.M. ragga hop mix) – 6:05
2. "Mr Loverman" (radio mix) – 3:36
3. "Mr Loverman" (twin city crew mix) – 4:05
4. "Mr Loverman" (new world mix) – 4:22
5. "Mr Loverman" (raggamental mix) – 4:24

== Charts ==
=== Weekly charts ===
Chart (1992)	Peak position
Australia (ARIA)	163
Austria (Ö3 Austria Top 40)	22
Belgium (Ultratop 50 Flanders)	33
Europe (Eurochart Hot 100)	54
Europe (European Dance Radio)	9
Germany (GfK)	17
Netherlands (Dutch Top 40)	21
Netherlands (Single Top 100)	21
Sweden (Sverigetopplistan)	31
UK Singles (Official Charts)	23
UK Dance (Music Week)	10
US Billboard Hot 100	40
US Dance Singles Sales (Billboard)	2
US Hot R&B/Hip-Hop Songs (Billboard)	2
US Cash Box Top 100	54

Chart (1993)	Peak position
Europe (Eurochart Hot 100)	17
France (SNEP)	19
Ireland (IRMA)	8
UK Singles (Official Charts)	3
UK Airplay (Music Week)	9
UK Dance (Music Week)	5

=== Year-end charts ===
Chart (1992)	Position
Brazil (Crowley)	77
Germany (Media Control)	68
US Hot R&B Singles (Billboard)	25
US Maxi-Singles Sales (Billboard)	12

Chart (1993)	Position
UK Singles (OCC)	35

== In popular culture ==
The song was used briefly in an episode of The Fresh Prince of Bel-Air. It was also featured in the soundtrack of 1992's motion-picture Deep Cover. The song was parodied in an episode of In Living Color titled "Mr. Ugly Man", where it was performed by actor/comedian Marlon Wayans. English football club Birmingham City used to sing this song about their striker Peter Lovenkrands until his retirement in November 2014. The British TV show Total Wipeout used the song for a contestant named Shabba.

== Samples and covers ==
The drum pattern was sampled by Alanis Morissette on "You Learn" from her multiplatinum album Jagged Little Pill (1995).
