= Pam (song) =

Single by Justin Quiles, Daddy Yankee and El Alfa

from the album La Última Promesa
- Language: Spanish
- Released: May 1, 2020
- Length: 3:21
- Label: Warner Music Latina
- Songwriters: Justin Quiles; Ramón Ayala; Emmanuel Batista; Carlos Ariel Peralta; Jorge Valdes Vasquez
- Producer: Maffio

Justin Quiles singles chronology
"Cuando Amanezca" (2020)	"Pam" (2020)

Daddy Yankee singles chronology
"Definitivamente" (2020)	"Pam" (2020)	"Bésame" (2020)

El Alfa singles chronology
"Coronao Now" (2019)	"Pam" (2020)	"No Mañana" (2020)

"Pam" is a song by American singer Justin Quiles, Puerto Rican rapper Daddy Yankee, and Dominican rapper El Alfa. The single reached a peak position of 33 on the Billboard Hot Latin Songs chart.

== Music video ==
The music video, which was directed by JP Valencia and produced by 36 Grados between Puerto Rico and Colombia, and has surpassed 60 million views.

== Charts ==
=== Weekly charts ===
Chart (2020)	Peak position
Argentina Hot 100 (Billboard)	26
Chile (Monitor Latino)	6
Colombia (National-Report)	45
Dominican Republic (Monitor Latino)	16
Dominican Republic (SODINPRO)	6
Dominican Urban Airplay (Monitor Latino)	11
Honduras (Monitor Latino)	13
Mexico Pop Airplay (Billboard)	26
Nicaragua (Monitor Latino)	16
Paraguay (SGP)	25
Peru (Monitor Latino)	2
Puerto Rico (Monitor Latino)	7
Spain (PROMUSICAE)	1
US Hot Latin Songs (Billboard)	14
US Latin Airplay (Billboard)	3
US Latin Pop Airplay (Billboard)	14

=== Year-end charts ===
Chart (2020)	Position
US Hot Latin Songs (Billboard)	56

== Certifications ==
Region	Certification	Certified units/sales
Colombia	Gold	
Spain (Promusicae)	2× Platinum	80,000^{‡}
United States (RIAA)	5× Platinum (Latin)	300,000^{‡}
^{‡} Sales+streaming figures based on certification alone.
