= Rough & Ready Volume 2 =

Rough & Ready, Vol 2

Studio album by Shabba Ranks
- Released: October 26, 1993
- Genre: Ragga, dancehall, reggae fusion
- Label: Epic

Shabba Ranks chronology
| X-tra Naked (1992) | Rough & Ready, Vol 2 (1993) | A Mi Shabba (1995) |

Professional ratings
Review scores
| Source | Rating |
|---|---|
| Allmusic | 3/5 stars |

Rough and Ready Volume 2 is a studio album released by Shabba Ranks. This album was not as successful as Volume 1 and it was going to be difficult to create an album as successful as its predecessor, X-tra Naked, which won a Grammy. Volume 2 was criticised for lacking variety.

== Track listing ==
| No. | Title | Writer(s) | Length |
|---|---|---|---|
| 1. | "Housecall" | Bennett, Dillon, Dunbar, Gordon, Priest, Thompson | 3:58 |
| 2. | "Girls Wine" | Gordon, Gordon | 3:30 |
| 3. | "Ting-A-Ling" | Browne, Gordon, Gordon, Johnson | 3:55 |
| 4. | "Telephone Love" | Bennett, Gordon, Hines, Lindo | 3:59 |
| 5. | "Get up Stand up and Rock" | Browne, Gordon, Johnson | 3:42 |
| 6. | "Mr. Tek It Back" | Browne, Dixon, Gordon, Gordon | 3:12 |
| 7. | "The Jam" | Dillon, Gordon, Longo, Mills, Parker | 4:32 |
| 8. | "Roots & Culture" | Gordon, Riley | 4:16 |
| 9. | "Twice My Age" | Brel, Gordon, McKuen, Ramdeen | 4:31 |
| 10. | "Pay Down Pon It" | Browne, Gordon, Johnson | 3:38 |
| 11. | "Respect" | Dixon, Gordon, Gordon | 3:58 |
| 12. | "Ting-A-Ling" (Original Version) | Browne, Gordon, Gordon, Johnson | 3:52 |
