= Best Baby Father =

Studio album by Shabba Ranks
- Released: 1988
- Studios: King Jammy's Recording Studios and HC & F Recording Studios, Freeport New York
- Genres: Ragga, dancehall
- Label: VP
- Producer: Bobby "Digital" Dixon

Shabba Ranks chronology
Rappin' with the Ladies (1988)	Best Baby Father (1988)	Holding On (1989)

Professional ratings
Review scores
Source	Rating
AllMusic	2/5 stars

Best Baby Father is the first album released by Shabba Ranks.

== Track listing ==
All tracks are written by Shabba Ranks, except where noted.

No.	Title	Writer(s)	Length
1.	"Born as a Don"		3:33
2.	"V.I.P."		3:31
3.	"Can't Drop off a Shape"		3:27
4.	"Bet Buss"		3:22
5.	"Best Baby Father"	Ranks, Steely & Clevie	3:32
6.	"Woman Mi Run Down"		3:16
7.	"Mauma Man"		3:20
8.	"Peeny Peeny"		3:24
9.	"What a Nite"		3:33
10.	"Never Hungry Yet"		3:31
