= Just Reality =

Studio album by Shabba Ranks
- Released: 1990
- Studio: Music Works (Kingston, Jamaica); Digital Recording Lab (Kingston, Jamaica)
- Genre: Ragga; dancehall
- Length: 41:43
- Label: VP
- Producer: Bobby "Digital" Dixon

Shabba Ranks chronology
| Best Baby Father (1988) | Just Reality (1990) | Golden Touch (1990) |

Singles from Just Reality
- 1. "Wicked Inna Bed" Released: 1989; 2. "Roots & Culture" Released: 1989; 3. "Gal Yuh Good" Released: 1990; 4. "Just Reality" Released: 1990; 5. "Dem Bow" Released: 1990

Professional ratings
Review scores
| Source | Rating |
|---|---|
| AllMusic | 2/5 stars |

Just Reality is the third solo studio album by Jamaican dancehall/reggae recording artist Shabba Ranks. Released in 1990 via VP Records, the album was produced by Bobby "Digital" Dixon.

While it did not receive as many positive reviews as its predecessor, the album included the massive hit "Wicked Inna Bed" and the highly influential track "Dem Bow", which played a key role in the instrumental birth of reggaeton as a genre.

== Track listing ==
All music is composed by Bobby "Digital" Dixon.

| No. | Title | Length |
|---|---|---|
| 1. | "Just Reality" | 3:20 |
| 2. | "Weh Yu Get It From" | 3:19 |
| 3. | "Gal Yuh' Good" | 3:34 |
| 4. | "Back and Belly Rock" | 3:38 |
| 5. | "Roots & Culture" | 4:00 |
| 6. | "Wicked Inna Bed" | 3:22 |
| 7. | "Dem Bow" | 3:36 |
| 8. | "The Rammer" | 3:41 |
| 9. | "Crab-Louse a Go Round" | 3:21 |
| 10. | "Mandela Free" | 3:26 |
| 11. | "Are You Sure" | 3:08 |
| 12. | "Pay Down Pon It / Live Blanket" | 3:18 |
| Total length: | | 41:43 |
