= Don Miguelo =

- Born: Miguel Ángel Valerio Lebrón; August 27, 1981 (age 45); San Francisco de Macoris, Dominican Republic
- Genres: Dembow, reggaeton
- Occupations: Rapper; singer
- Instrument: Vocals
- Years active: 2001-present
- Label: Mr. 305 Inc.
- Partner: Nabila Tapia (2015–2016)

Miguel Ángel Valerio Lebrón (born August 27, 1981), better known by his stage name Don Miguelo, is a Dominican rapper and singer. He became famous with his smash hit "La Cola De Motora" and he has twice been awarded with the Casandra Awards.

== Career ==
Don Miguelo is a singer from San Francisco de Macoris, Dominican Republic. He won the Revelation Artist category at the 2006 Casandra Awards thanks to the success with his first hit the song “Que Tu Quieres” better known as “ La Cola De Motora” from his first album “Contra El Tiempo”. He later would confess that the success of this song even surprised himself. This disc was mixed and created in the Dominican Republic and includes the work of Rafy Mercenario, Frank Reyes and Monchy & Alexandra.

In the 2012 version of the Casandra Awards he performed in the opening ceremony and won the best Urban Artist category. For receiving his second Casandra Award the Mayor of his native San Francisco de Macoris gave him a plaque as Distinguished son.

== Personal life ==
When he was a child, his mother abandoned him leaving him in the care of his father. His father, was absent as well, leaving him in the care of his grandparents on his father's side (the Valerio's). When he was 10, his mother sent him back home by himself in the city instead of accompanying the boy in the dangerous streets. Before turning to music, he worked as a tailor, cabinet making and as a Radio DJ. His girlfriend was Nabila Tapia and they have one child. In July 2012, he served preventive time in jail in San Cristobal due to his ex-wife accusing him of violence towards her and of showing videos of her in sexually compromising positions. He was released from jail in August 2012 after paying a RD$100,000 bail and his ex-wife being granted a restraining order.
