= Seaview Gardens =

Community in Kingston, Jamaica

Seaview Gardens is a community in the St. Andrew South section of Kingston, Jamaica. It is known for the reggae superstars who grew up there. Musicians such as Dexta Daps have paid tribute to the area in song, noting violence and struggle, but also community and culture such as Shabba Ranks mom cooking (Shabba Madda Pot). The area is mentioned in the T.O.K. song "Footprints".

In October 2017 residents protested poor road conditions in the area. In December 2017, the government of Jamaica announced the opening of Drug Serv Pharmacy at the community's health centre.
