= Shabba Ranks and Friends =

Shabba Ranks & Friends

Compilation album by Shabba Ranks
- Released: January 26, 1999
- Genre: Reggae fusion, ragga, dancehall
- Length: 49:10
- Label: Sony

Shabba Ranks chronology
Get Up Stand Up (1998)	Shabba Ranks & Friends (1999)

Professional ratings
Review scores
Source	Rating
Allmusic	4/5 stars

Shabba Ranks and Friends is a compilation album released by Shabba Ranks, the album includes most of Shabba Ranks' most successful hits. The album also features many other reggae artists who feature in the songs on the album.

== Track listing ==
No.	Title	Writer(s)	Length
1.	"Mr. Loverman"	Bennett, Gordon, Lindo	5:36
2.	"Slow and Sexy"	Dillon, Dunbar, Gordon, Harris III, Law, Lewis, Tucker	5:19
3.	"Housecall" (The Morales Remix)	Bennett, Dillon, Dunbar, Gordon, Priest, Thomson	3:37
4.	"The Jam" (The Bridge Remix)	Dillon, Longo, Mills, Parker	3:20
5.	"Shine Eye Gal"	Gordon, Rose, Simpson	4:22
6.	"Telephone Love"	Bennett, Gordon, Hines, Lindo	4:12
7.	"Mr. G"	Dillion, Garvey, Gordon, Harmon, Jobe, Phillips	4:06
8.	"Pirates' Anthem"	Bennett, Gordon, Lindo, Scott, Tucker	5:41
9.	"Universal Love"	Dillon, Garvey, Gordon, Harmon, Jobe, Ky Mani, Marley, Phillips	4:13
10.	"Ice Cream Love"	Dillon, Gordon, Lawes	4:22
11.	"Two Breddrens"	Dillon, Gordon, Simpson	4:24
