= Dexta Daps =

Jamaican singer

Louis Anthony Grandison (born 12 January 1986), known by his stage name Dexta Daps, Dex, Dappa Don or Dexta, is a Jamaican dancehall and reggae performer. Grandison's career began in 2012 with the release of his first two singles "Save Me Jah" and "May You Be". Though he has made many songs in between the periods (such as "Grease Mi Gun" and "Dis a Di Bess"), he really began gaining public recognition in 2014 with his songs "Morning Love", and "Jealous Ova", the latter of which featured another upcoming dancehall artist Tifa. Dexta Daps rode this wave of popularity into 2015. With the release of "Shabba Madda Pot" having over 23 million views on YouTube, this song is one of Grandison's most iconic songs. He has collaborated with many dancehall artists including Kranium, Masicka, Mavado, and international artists Alike M.I.A, Davido, Kiesza, and Tory Lanez. Dexta also has 3 collaborations with fellow Seaview artist Blakkman. Dexta Daps is praised for his versatility, unique voice, style and, performances.

== Personal life ==
Grandison was born on January 12, 1986, and was raised in Seaview Gardens, a humble, impoverished neighborhood in Kingston, Jamaica that produced other dancehall artists including Bounty Killer and Elephant Man. This community inspired songs like "Shabba Madda Pot" which Dexta describes as telling the story of the area's history. He went to Calabar High School where he played football (soccer). He was proficient enough to play inter-school competitions and even played in the Manning Cup football competition for his school. At an early age Dexta began to express his emotions through music. "I would hear the melodic voices of the kids crying for help, and the sadness of the people. Their voices, and hunger for retribution was very inspiring for me, and made me want to sing songs of happiness and joy." He looked up to several dancehall artists at the time especially Bounty killer who played a part in the popularization and promoting of the artist.

== Career ==
Dexta Daps released his first 2 singles "Save Me Jah" and "May You Be" in 2012, at the age of 26. However, he received significant public attention in 2014 with the release of "Jealous Ova" in collaboration with dancehall artist, Tifa, and international hit "7-Eleven". Many popular singles followed until the release of his debut album Intro in 2017. This album solidified Dap's persona as Dancehall's sex-symbol as it featured a short erotic film on YouTube, which gained over 9.4 million views before it was age-restricted by the platform. He performed at the reputable Reggae Sumfest in 2017 with a performance that he considered one of his most strongly responded to. He has been subsequently invited perform again at Reggae Sumfest in 2019, and 2022.

Daps released another popular single "No Underwear" in 2019, which was more of a slower, sexual anthem. He recently released an album "Vent" in 2020, which received praise from multiple artists like Bounty Killer and Masicka.

Grandison has gone on to collaborate with many international artists including Louie Culture and Tory Lanez, establishing his presence on the international scene.

== Public image ==
Dexta's more popular songs follow themes of love, sex, and relationships. Songs like "Owner" and "No Underwear" are examples of his more lewd songs where Daps speaks explicitly about his experiences with multiple women. These songs influenced his image as "Dancehall's biggest sex symbol" and have resulted in a large female following. Currently, Daps is infamous for his sexually explicit concerts where he invites female audience members on stage.

While less commonly associated with his character, Dexta also often portrays a more rugged and violent "gun man" persona. Seen in songs like "Grow Rough" and "Squeeze". While this theme of song has not achieved as much commercial success as others, it is still very prominent in the Dancehall scene.

Finally Dexta portrays a strong sense of family and community with those in his home town. In an interview explaining the origin of his song "Shabba Madda Pot", he explains that Shabba's (a friend living in the community) mother, "Muma Christie" would regularly cook meals for the children in the community and would make sure that everyone had something to eat. He holds his community closely and is thankful for what he has learned growing up there. Daps' family side is also displayed in his public expressions of love for his mother. He has multiple songs devoted to her including "Mek Mama Proud", and "Superhero," the latter of which contains a line saying, "just say what you want it reach to you". In August 2021 the artiste delivered on this promise when he purchased a new Porsche Macan for his mother as a birthday gift accompanied by an Instagram post captioned "I DNT USUALLY DO THIS BUT HAPPY BDAY MUM P…LOVE U UNCONDITIONALLY LA FAMILIA".

== Controversies ==
Dexta Daps' tendency to invite women on stage at his performance has been the subject of much controversy. At one of his performances in the Cayman Islands, a woman that was invited on stage attempted to remove her underwear and place it atop the artist's head. According to one radio broadcaster, DJ Amber, Dexta should be able to recognize by now that he is being victimized by the very women he is trying to entertain. The artist, however, has ignored such opinions as these as he continues to invite women onstage during his performance.

Another controversy arose on April 8, 2020, when Grandison was arrested in his home-town of Seaview Gardens for suspected gun possession and involvement in gun violence. Despite having no clear convictions, the artist's application for release was denied on April 20, “I have not done anything to be incarcerated,” he pleaded. He was later released on April 30 with no formal charges being laid against him.

== Discography ==
=== LPs ===
- 2017: Intro - (Daseca Productions)
- 2020: Vent - (Dexta Daps Music Group)
- 2021: Vent Deluxe - (Dexta Daps Music Group)
- 2024: Trilogy - (Dexta Daps Music Group)

=== EPs ===
- 2018: Free Me - (Zojak Worldwide)

=== Singles ===
- 2012: "May You Be"
- 2012: "Save Me Jah"
- 2014: "Morning Love"
- 2014: "7-Eleven"
- 2015: "Weak to You"
- 2015: "Slavery"
- 2015: "Shabba Madda Pot"
- 2016: "F U"
- 2017: "F**k U Mean"
- 2019: "Squeeze"
- 2020: "Breaking News"

=== Collaborations ===
- 2014: "Jealous Ova" - (w/ Tifa)
- 2015: "Miss You So Much" - (w/ Blakkman)
- 2017: "Superhero" - (w/ Blakkman)
- 2019: "Leader" - (w/ Masicka and Dunw3ll)
- 2019: "Inna Di World Remix" - (w/ Monea)
- 2020: "War Season" - (w/ Blakkman and Chronic Law)
- 2021: "Vanish" - (w/ Masicka)
- 2021: "Call Me If (remix)" - (w/ Louie Culture and Tory Lanez)
- 2022: "Mi General" - (w/ Ikaya and Sponge Music)
