= Golden Touch (album) =

Studio album by Shabba Ranks
- Released: 1991
- Genre: Ragga, dancehall
- Length: 42:10
- Label: VP

Shabba Ranks chronology
Just Reality (1991)	Golden Touch (1991)	As Raw as Ever (1991)

Professional ratings
Review scores
Source	Rating
AllMusic	2/5 stars

Golden Touch is the fourth album released by Shabba Ranks.

The album was listed in the 1999 book The Rough Guide: Reggae: 100 Essential CDs.

== Track listing ==
All tracks are written by Michael Bennett and Rexton Gordon, except where noted.

No.	Title	Writer(s)	Length
1.	"Golden Touch"	Gordon, Danny Browne, Wycliffe "Steely" Johnson	4:14
2.	"Mi Nuh Romp with It"		3:29
3.	"Love Up Your Woman"		3:49
4.	"Build Bridges Instead"		3:43
5.	"House Husband"		3:36
6.	"Private Property"	Unknown	3:49
7.	"If a My Youth"		3:24
8.	"Digit It"		3:37
9.	"Kill Mi Dead"		3:40
10.	"Wicked Inna Bed, Pt. 2"	Bennett, Gordon, Browne, Johnson	3:46
