= Dem Bow =

1990 song performed by Shabba Ranks

Song by Shabba Ranks

from the album Just Reality
- Released: 1990
- Genre: Reggae, dancehall
- Length: 3:36
- Label: VP
- Songwriter: Steely & Clevie
- Producer: Bobby Digital

"Dem Bow" is a song performed by Jamaican reggae artist Shabba Ranks, and produced by Bobby Digital. This song uses the "Ku-Klung-Klung"/"Poco Man Jam" riddim (based on the title of the 1990 Gregory Peck and Red Dragon song), also known as "Fish Market", created by Jamaican producers Steely & Clevie in the late 1980s. The lyrics are anti-imperialist (the title is Jamaican patois for "they bow", with Ranks disparaging people who do so) and also anti-homosexual, as Ranks compares those who perform sodomy to those who submit to colonialism.

Elements of the song's dembow riddim as well as Dennis the Menace's "Pounder (Dub Mix II)" have been incorporated into over 80% of all reggaeton productions. Evidently, "Dem Bow" has shaped and informed transnational flows and shifts within the genre over time. Reggaeton articulates a particular "audible thread" that weaves together various flows (and waves) of music, people, and ideologies. In examining this musical evolution, aspects of race, class, and culture are inextricably linked to sociocultural elements surrounding the genre. In harnessing "Dem Bow" as a point of centrality, this song speaks to various patterns of migration, commercialization, branding, and reforming within the context of reggaeton.

== History of "Dem Bow" remixes ==
"Dem Bow" remixes of the early 1990s originated from Panama, followed in the late '90s by Puerto Rico and New York in the form of long, 30-minute mixtapes that fused digital samples of hip-hop, dancehall and the riddim of reggaeton hits. These chopped up mixes of reggaeton and hip-hop created a new intercultural space of blackness within the urban diaspora of New York and San Juan. Additionally, while the introduction of accessible digital production tools widened the intra-diasporic neo-sonic conversation across genres, it also provided a conta-mechanism for the widespread subcommercialization of reggaeton into what we may term as reggaeton popular. As seen in Wisin & Yandel's 2003 version of "Dem Bow", while there is a definite remnant of the original riddim, Ranks' of rabid homophobia is erased and transformed into a sweet song about sensuality. Although there is no explicit retention of these political messages; there is a retention of the implicit "ultramacho pose" of Shabba Ranks. Instead of expressing this machismo through homophobia, "Dem Bow" expresses it through the more traditional song form of objectifying women.

In considering these transnational exchanges, there were a variety of factors that fed into the shaping and popularization of reggaeton. The 1990s to early 2000s marked a key shift within the genre. There was an evident erasure of black diasporic roots. For example, in the mid-1990s, the genre was often referred to as "musica negra" or just hip-hop/reggae; however, as the genre grew and popularized, it became more widely known as reggaeton de Puerto Rico.

There are various influences that produce this genre as they extend across Jamaican, Puerto Rican, and American culture. While there is existing controversy over which artists/groups can claim ownership over reggaeton, "Dem Bow" embodied the base culture that centered and informed the shaping of reggaeton. The history of this musical evolution starts with transnational exchanges between Jamaica and Panama. Many were influenced by Anglo-Caribbean migrant workers who resided in Panama in the late 1970s, and in turn Panamanian artists were the first to perform reggae in Spanish. Often earlier covers of "Dem Bow" were lyrically very exact in meaning and translation. However, during these translations there was a significant change of the use of the word "bow" from a verb to a noun. In the original "Dem Bow" song by Shabba Ranks, bow was used as a verb trying to persuade listeners to not bow to foreign influence. In El General's song entitled "Son Bow", "bow" is used as a noun and not a verb. Evidently, there was a clear audible engagement with Jamaican riddims, narratives, and socio-political life. These translations and connections were further complicated by expressions of anti-colonial resistance and anti-gay sentiment in the genre. In turn, this speaks to persisting assertions and disidentifications of cultural narratives and histories surrounding black sexual and gender identities. In looking beyond Panama, Puerto Rico is often recognized as the place where reggaeton was "crystallized". Puerto Rican artists in New York specifically reformed the genre as a hybrid site of hip-hop and reggae––grounding the music in "reference" rather than "reverence" to "Dem Bow". This soundscape cultivated a musical fusion that recontextualized reggaeton in the space of the Bronx/El Barrio.

All in all, the "mezcla" of reggaeton is produced by a fusion that is rooted in black diasporic musical exchange. As evidenced by the transnational flow and influence stemming from "Dem Bow", reggaeton provides a unique soundscape that amalgamates a multitude of identities, histories, and cultures.

In 2020, a revamped version of Wisin & Yandel's "Dembow" was released by Yandel, one half of the duo, featuring Rauw Alejandro, which appears on Yandel's sixth album, Quién Contra Mí 2.
