= As Raw as Ever =

Studio album by Shabba Ranks
- Released: 21 May 1991
- Genre: Ragga, dancehall, reggae fusion
- Length: 44:35
- Label: Epic
- Producer: Mikey Bennett, Cleveland "Clevie" Browne, Bobby Dixon, Wycliffe "Steely" Johnson, KRS-One

Shabba Ranks chronology
Golden Touch (1991)	As Raw as Ever (1991)	Rough And Ready Volume 1 (1992)

Professional ratings
Review scores
Source	Rating
Allmusic	4.5/5 stars

As Raw As Ever is a studio album released by Shabba Ranks, his first to be well received by critics and the public. In 1992, the album won the Grammy Award for Best Reggae Album.

== Track listing ==
- All Songs Published By Aunt Hilda Music.
1. Trailor Load a Girls - 3:58 (Cleveland "Clevie" Browne, Wycliffe Johnson, Greville Gordon)
2. Where Does Slackness Come From - 3:48 (Gordon)
3. Woman Tangle - 3:48 (Gordon, Clifton Dillon)
4. Gun Pon Me - 3:53 (Leopold Hartley, Shabba Ranks)
5. Gone Up - 3:55 (Gordon)
6. Housecall (featuring Maxi Priest) - 3:39 (Dillon, Brian Thompson, Maxi Priest, Mike Bennett, Ranks)
7. Flesh Axe - 4:10 (Browne, Dillon, Johnson)
8. A Mi Di Girls Dem Love - 3:29 (Gordon, Ranks)
9. Fist-A-Ris - 3:33 (Gordon, Ranks)
10. The Jam (featuring KRS-One) - 3:22 (KRS-One, Dillon, Joseph Longo, Lawrence Krisna Parker, Stephanie Mills)
11. Ambi Get Scarce - 3:52 (Hartley, Ranks)
12. Park Yu Benz - 3:26 (Gordon, Ranks)

== Personnel ==
- Shabba Ranks: Vocal
- Mikey Bennett, Paul "Wrong Move" Crossdale, Michael Fletcher, Handel Tucker: Keyboards
- Earl Smith: Guitars
- Stephen "Cat" Coore: Guitars, Vocals
- Danny Dennis, Wycliffe "Steely" Johnson: Bass, Keyboards
- Cleveland "Clevie" Browne, Sly Dunbar, George "Dusty" Miller: Drums, Percussion
- Danny Browne: Keyboards, Bass, Drums, Percussion
- Chevelle Franklin, Brian & Tony Gold, Dorothy Smith: Backing Vocals

== Charts ==
=== Weekly charts ===
Chart (1991)	Peak position
US Billboard 200	89
US Top R&B/Hip-Hop Albums (Billboard)	1

=== Year-end charts ===
Chart (1991)	Position
US Top R&B/Hip-Hop Albums (Billboard)	63
Chart (1992)	Position
US Top R&B/Hip-Hop Albums (Billboard)	52

== Certifications ==
Region	Certification	Certified units/sales
United States (RIAA)	Gold	500,000^{^}
^{^} Shipments figures based on certification alone.

== See also ==
- List of number-one R&B albums of 1991 (U.S.)
