= Shabba Ranks =

Jamaican dancehall musician (born 1966)

Shabba Ranks OD
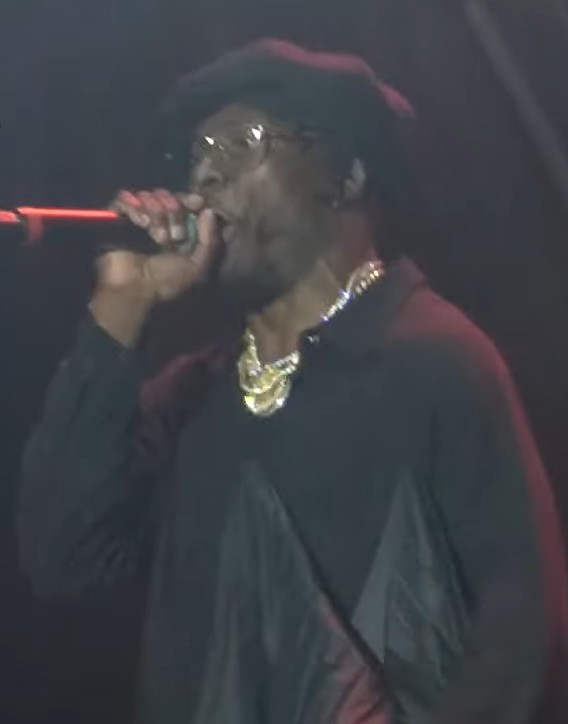
- Ranks performing at Reggae Land in 2024

Background information
- Born: Rexton Rawlston Fernando Gordon; 17 January 1966 (age 60); Saint Ann, Jamaica
- Origin: Kingston, Jamaica
- Genres: Dancehall; reggae; hip-hop
- Occupation: Musician
- Years active: 1985–present
- Label: Epic (1991–96)

Rexton Rawlston Fernando Gordon OD (born 17 January 1966), better known by his stage name Shabba Ranks, is a Jamaican dancehall musician. In the late 1980s and early 1990s, he was one of the most popular Jamaican musicians in the world. Although his early success ensured he was prominent in his home country as a dancehall artist, he gained popularity in North America with his album Just Reality in 1990. He released other albums, including As Raw as Ever and X-tra Naked, which both won a Grammy Award as Best Reggae Album in 1992 and 1993, respectively. He is notoriously popular for "Mr. Loverman" and "Ting-A-Ling", which were globally acclaimed and deemed his signature songs.

== Early life ==
Shabba Ranks was born in Sturge Town, Saint Ann, Jamaica, and raised in Seaview Gardens, Kingston.

His father, Ivan Gordon, was a mason who died in 1990. His mother, Constance "Mama Christie" Christie, remained in Seaview after Shabba's success, feeding the community with money sent from her son after his emigration. She was the subject of the 2015 hit song "Shabba Madda Pot" from the dancehall artist Dexta Daps.

== Career ==
He gained his fame mainly by toasting (or rapping) rather than singing, like some of his dancehall contemporaries in Jamaica. He was a protégé of DJ Josey Wales. His original stage name was Co-Pilot. His international career started in the late 1980s, along with a number of fellow Jamaicans including reggae singers Cocoa Tea and Crystal. Ranks also worked with Chuck Berry and American rappers KRS-One and Chubb Rock.

He secured a recording contract with Epic Records in 1989.

The stylistic origins of the genre reggaeton can be traced back to the 1990 song "Dem Bow", from Ranks' album Just Reality. Produced by Bobby "Digital" Dixon, the Dem Bow riddim became so popular in Puerto Rican freestyle sessions that early Puerto Rican reggaeton was simply known as "Dembow". The Dem Bow riddim is an integral and inseparable part of reggaeton, so much so that it has become its defining characteristic. The song name itself is lent to a subgenre of reggaeton from the Dominican Republic, Dominican dembow.

His biggest hit single outside of Jamaica was the reggae fusion smash "Mr. Loverman". Other big tracks include "Housecall" with Maxi Priest, "Slow and Sexy" with Johnny Gill, "Respect", "Pirates Anthem", "Trailer Load a Girls", "Wicked inna Bed", "Caan Dun", and "Ting A Ling". He won the Grammy Award for Best Reggae Album in 1992 for As Raw as Ever and in 1993 for X-tra Naked.

In 1993, Ranks scored another hit in the Addams Family Values soundtrack to which he contributed a rap/reggae version of the Sly and the Family Stone hit "Family Affair". His third album for Epic, A Mi Shabba, was released in 1995. He was dropped by the label in 1996. Epic went on to release a greatest hits album, entitled Shabba Ranks and Friends in 1999.

Ranks made a partial comeback in 2007 when he appeared on a song called "Clear the Air" by Busta Rhymes, which also featured Akon. Shabba released a single on Big Ship's Pepper Riddim called "None A Dem", in April 2011. In 2012, Shabba was featured on Tech N9ne's EP E.B.A.H. on the track "Boy Toy". In 2013, Shabba was also mentioned in A$AP Ferg's song "Shabba," and has a cameo near the end of the music video. He was featured in the remix alongside Migos and Busta Rhymes on 23 November 2013. In August 2013, he was reportedly working on a new album.

== Controversy ==
Ranks has been controversial for homophobia, particularly violent attitudes towards homosexuals. The 1990 song "Wicked Inna Bed" includes lyrics about shooting gay men.

In 1992, during an appearance on Channel 4 music show The Word, he was asked to give his thoughts on the subject of the hit song "Boom Bye Bye" by Buju Banton. Shabba held a copy of a Bible which he carried with him and stated that the "word of God" advocated the "crucifixion of homosexuals". He also alluded that he advocates the progression of the Jamaican people and freedom of speech but did not conclude that being against homosexuality would be in question of exclusion, according to Bible laws. He was condemned for his comments by presenter Mark Lamarr, who said, "That's absolute crap and you know it." Following these comments, Ranks was dropped from a Bobby Brown concert as a performer and faced altercations with his label, Sony Music. Ranks subsequently apologised, after realising that his comments might advocate "the killing of gays and lesbians and any human being in retrospect".

== Personal life ==
Ranks and his wife, Michelle, have two sons Rexton Jr and Jahwon. He currently resides in New York City.

== Awards ==
| Year | Award | Category | Work | Result |
|---|---|---|---|---|
| 1992 | Grammy Award | Best Reggae Album | As Raw as Ever | Won |
| 1993 | Grammy Award | Best Reggae Album | X-tra Naked | Won |

== Discography ==
=== Studio albums ===
| Title | Album details | Peak chart positions | | | | | Certifications |
| Title | Album details | US | US R&B | US Reggae | AUS | UK | Certifications |
|---|---|---|---|---|---|---|---|
| Rough & Rugged (with Chaka Demus) | Released: 1988; Label: Jammy's Records/Super Power; Formats: CD, LP, cassette | — | — | — | — | — | |
| Best Baby Father | Released: 1988; Label: Greensleeves; Formats: CD, LP, cassette | — | — | — | — | — | |
| Rappin' with the Ladies | Released: 1988; Label: Jammy's Records/Super Power; Formats: CD, LP, cassette | — | 75 | — | — | — | |
| Holding On (with Home T and Cocoa Tea) | Released: 1989; Label: Greensleeves; Formats: CD, LP, cassette | — | — | — | — | — | |
| Just Reality | Released: 1990; Label: VP; Formats: CD, LP, cassette | — | — | — | — | — | |
| Golden Touch | Released: 1991; Label: VP; Formats: CD, LP, cassette | — | — | — | — | — | |
| As Raw as Ever | Released: May 21, 1991; Label: Epic; Formats: CD, LP, cassette | 89 | 1 | — | — | 51 | RIAA: Gold |
| Mr. Maximum | Released: 1992; Label: Greensleeves; Formats: CD, LP, cassette | — | 56 | — | — | — | |
| Rough & Ready Volume 1 | Released: July 14, 1992; Label: Epic; Formats: CD, LP, cassette | 78 | 24 | — | — | 71 | |
| X-tra Naked | Released: October 1992; Label: Epic; Formats: CD, LP, cassette | 64 | 11 | 14 | 188 | 38 | RIAA: Gold |
| Rough & Ready Volume 2 | Released: October 26, 1993; Label: Epic; Formats: CD, LP, cassette | — | 84 | 10 | — | — | |
| A Mi Shabba | Released: June 13, 1995; Label: Epic; Formats: CD, LP, cassette | 133 | 25 | 2 | — | — | |
| Get Up Stand Up | Released: November 1998; Label: Artists Only; Formats: CD, LP, cassette, digital download | — | — | — | — | — | |
"—" denotes releases that did not chart.

=== Compilation albums ===
| Year | Album | Chart positions |
| Year | Album | US Reggae |
|---|---|---|
| 1998 | Shabba Ranks and Friends | 14 |

=== Singles ===
| Year | Title | Peak chart positions | | | | | | Album |
| Year | Title | JAM Air. | US | US R&B | US Rap | AUS | UK | Album |
|---|---|---|---|---|---|---|---|---|
| 1989 | "Peanie Peanie" | * | ― | ― | ― | ― | ― | Peanie Peanie Riddim |
| 1990 | "Roots & Culture" | * | ― | ― | ― | ― | ― | Just Reality |
| 1991 | "She's a Woman" (with Scritti Politti) | * | ― | ― | ― | ― | 20 | Non-album single |
| 1991 | "Trailer Load a Girls" | * | ― | ― | ― | ― | 63 | As Raw as Ever |
| 1991 | "Housecall" (featuring Maxi Priest) | * | 37 | 4 | ― | 153 | 31 | As Raw as Ever |
| 1992 | "The Jam" (featuring KRS-One) | * | ― | 52 | 1 | ― | ― | As Raw as Ever |
| 1992 | "Mr. Loverman" (featuring Deborahe Glasgow) | * | 40 | 2 | ― | 163 | 23 | Rough & Ready, Vol. 1/Deep Cover |
| 1992 | "Ting A Ling" | 9 | ― | ― | 25 | ― | ― | X-tra Naked |
| 1992 | "Slow and Sexy" (featuring Johnny Gill) | * | 33 | 4 | ― | 181 | 17 | X-tra Naked |
| 1993 | "I Was a King" (with Eddie Murphy) | * | ― | 61 | ― | ― | 64 | Non-album single |
| 1993 | "Mr. Loverman" (re-release) | * | ― | ― | ― | ― | 3 | X-tra Naked |
| 1993 | "Muscle Grip" | * | ― | 67 | 29 | ― | ― | X-tra Naked |
| 1993 | "Housecall" (remix; featuring Maxi Priest) | * | ― | ― | ― | ― | 8 | Non-album single |
| 1993 | "What'cha Gonna Do" (featuring Queen Latifah) | * | ― | 62 | 14 | ― | 21 | X-tra Naked |
| 1993 | "Family Affair" (featuring Patra and Terri & Monica) | * | 84 | 16 | 6 | ― | 18 | Non-album single |
| 1995 | "Let's Get It On" | * | 81 | 27 | ― | ― | 22 | A Mi Shabba |
| 1995 | "Shine Eye Gal" (featuring Mykal Rose) | * | ― | ― | ― | ― | 46 | A Mi Shabba |
| 1996 | "Heart of a Lion" | * | ― | ― | ― | ― | ― | Non-album single |
| 1997 | "So Jah Say" | * | ― | ― | ― | ― | ― | Non-album single |
"—" denotes a recording that did not chart or was not released in that territory. "*" denotes that the chart did not exist at that time.

=== Videos and DVDs ===
- 2002: Shabba Ranks: Dancehall Ruff – Best of Shabba Ranks (DVD)
- 2001: The Return of Shabba Ranks (DVD)
- 1994: Darker Side of Black
- 1992: Shabba Ranks: Naked and Ready
- 1992: Shabba Ranks: Fresh & Wild
- 1992: Shabba Ranks vs. Ninja Man: Super Clash Round
- 1990: Reggae Showdown, Vol. 4: Shabba at Showdown (DVD)
- 1987: Prince Jammy
