= Danny Ocean =

Danny Ocean may refer to:

- Danny Ocean (singer) (born 1992), Venezuelan singer, songwriter and record producer
- Danny Ocean (character), a fictional character in Ocean's 11 and sequels
