= Rough & Ready Volume 1 =

Rough & Ready, Vol. 1

Studio album by Shabba Ranks
- Released: July 14, 1992
- Genre: Reggae fusion, dancehall, ragga
- Length: 42:31
- Label: Epic

Shabba Ranks chronology
As Raw as Ever (1991)	Rough & Ready, Vol. 1 (1992)	X-tra Naked (1992)

Professional ratings
Review scores
Source	Rating
Allmusic	4.5/5 stars

Rough & Ready, Vol. 1 is a studio album released by Shabba Ranks. After his previous album, As Raw as Ever, received positive reviews, his good spell continued as Rough & Ready, Vol. 1 likewise received positive reviews and enjoyed some commercial success, reaching #71 in the UK and #82 in Germany.

"Mr. Loverman" also appeared on the Deep Cover soundtrack.

== Track listing ==
No.	Title	Writer(s)	Length
1.	"Mr. Loverman" (featuring Chevelle Franklyn)	Bennett, Lindo, Ranks	5:38
2.	"Pirates' Anthem" (featuring Cocoa Tea and Tony Rebel)	Bennett, Ranks, Scott, Tucker	5:48
3.	"Wicked Inna Bed"	Browne, Johnson, Ranks	3:31
4.	"Woodtop"	Browne, Gordon, Johnson, Ranks	3:37
5.	"Gal Yuh' Good"	Browne, Johnson, Ranks	3:45
6.	"Just Reality"	Browne, Johnson, Ranks	3:27
7.	"Hard and Stiff"	Browne, Johnson, Ranks	3:36
8.	"Caan Dun"	Browne, Gordon, Johnson, Ranks	5:25
9.	"Raggamuffin"	Browne, Gordon, Ranks	4:02
10.	"Bad & Wicked"	Gordon, Ranks	3:45
