= Dembow beat =

Percussion rhythm used in reggaeton music

Dembow beat
Sample of three common variations of the dembow beat; the first beat is "Pounder (Dub Mix II)" by Dennis the Menace, followed by "A Who Seh Me Dun" by Courtney Cole, then lastly the "Fever Pitch" riddim by Bunny Lie Lie and E. Sharman.

The dembow beat or dembow riddim is a musical rhythm best known for its use as the core percussion element in reggaeton music, having taken its name from the 1990 dancehall song "Dem Bow" by Shabba Ranks.

== History ==
At the beginning of the 1990s, there existed several closely related Jamaican-origin dancehall riddims revolving around a "boom-ch-boom-chick" sound such as the "Bam Bam riddim" or the "Fever Pitch riddim". One of these riddims was "Fish Market", also known as the "Pocoman Jam riddim", produced by Jamaican duo Steely & Clevie in 1989. This riddim was then used in the 1990 song "Dem Bow" by Shabba Ranks, of which the name "dembow" was taken, becoming known as the "Dem Bow riddim". The same year, it was reworked by producer Dennis the Menace in "Pounder (Dub Mix II)", the B-side of the vocal version "Pounder" performed by Bobo General and Sleepy Wonder. "Dub Mix II" is the version that was later sampled by Puerto Rican artists in the early 1990s to 2000s, as well as the "dem bow" name being used to describe the entire nascent genre that would eventually come to be known as reggaeton.

As reggaeton was beginning to form, it also employed the tresillo pattern that is common in Latin American music. The term "dembow" today commonly refers simply to the drum beat of reggaeton, which, while retaining its core "boom-ch-boom-chick" sound, has stylistic variations.

== Characteristics ==
The dembow rhythm is usually employed as a loop, in line with reggaeton's mainly electronic production. Described as having a "bounce", it has a 3+3+2 (tresillo) cross-rhythm with a slight syncopation on every other half-beat.

While dembow is the main building block of the reggaeton genre, similar modern rhythms can be found in Africa with the genres of afrobeats, on account of their common ancestry. There are also connections with Arabic music, credited to "cross-pollination" between Spain, the Arab world, and sub-Saharan Africa.
